= Vasudev Devnani =

Indian politician

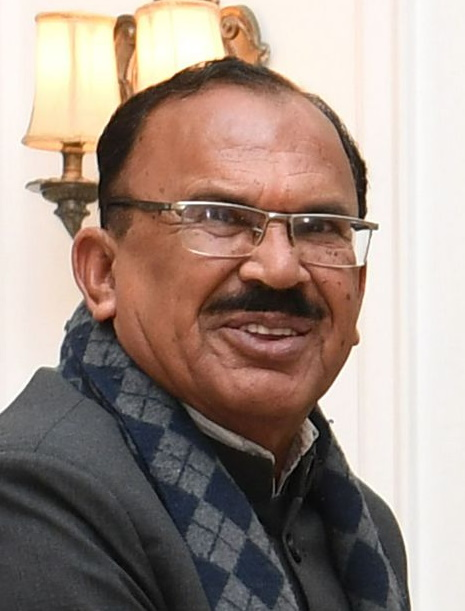
- Devnani in 2024

18th Speaker of the Rajasthan Legislative Assembly
- Incumbent
- Assumed office 21 December 2023
- Governor: Kalraj Mishra; Haribhau Bagade
- Chief Minister Dy. Chief Ministers: Bhajan Lal Sharma; Diya Kumari & Prem Chand Bairwa
- Preceded by: C. P. Joshi

Member of the Rajasthan Legislative Assembly
- Incumbent
- Assumed office 2008
- Preceded by: New constituency
- Constituency: Ajmer North

Minister of State for Education, Government of Rajasthan
- In office 9 December 2003 – 10 December 2008
- In office 28 October 2014 – 11 December 2018

Personal details
- Born: 11 January 1950 (age 76) Ajmer, Ajmer State, India
- Party: Bharatiya Janata Party
- Spouse: Indira Devnani (m. 1974)
- Children: 1 son and 2 daughters
- Parents: Bhawan Das Devnani (father); Sakhi Devi (mother)
- Education: Engineering
- Occupation: Politician
- Profession: Teacher
- Source

Vasudev Devnani is an Indian politician from Rajasthan serving as the 18th speaker of the Rajasthan Legislative Assembly since December 2024. He is also an MLA from Ajmer North. He is a member of the Bharatiya Janata Party. Vasudev Devnani is the first Sindhi to become speaker in Rajasthan assembly.

== Life and career ==
Vasudev Devnani was born in Ajmer on 11 January 1950. He received B.E. degree in Electrical Engineering from one of the finest and oldest colleges, MBM Engineering college, Jodhpur. After that he went on to an academic career, eventually becoming the Dean of Vidhya Bhawan Polytechnic College in Udaipur.

He is married to Indira Devnani, a retired school teacher. The couple have one son and two daughters.

== Political career ==
Devnani joined the Rashtriya Swayamsevak Sangh (RSS) at a young age and later its student wing Akhil Bharatiya Vidyarthi Parishad (ABVP), serving as the Rajasthan state president of the latter for nine years. Subsequently, he joined the Bharatiya Janata Party (BJP).

Devnani was elected to the Legislative Assembly of Rajasthan from the Ajmer North constituency in 2003, obtaining 45% of the total votes. He was elected again in 2008 and 2013.

He was a Minister of State for technical education in the Ministry of Vasundhara Raje in 2003-08. He was a Minister of State with an independent charge for primary and secondary education in the Ministry of Vasundhara Raje in 2013-18.

== Political and administrative views ==
According to India Today, he is striking a balance between modernity, essential reforms and the BJP agenda of Indian culture-based education.

Among his measures are celebrating Basant Panchami in schools, singing Saraswati vandana and performing surya namaskar every day. However, his measures to introduce compulsory Saraswati puja and surya namaskar have invited opposition from the schools run by the Arya Samaj, Muslim community and the Christian missionaries.

Devnani declared that the "Indian value system" would be introduced in schools from 2015-16. He called for a National Education Regulatory Board for the fast implementation of the Indian value system in schools nationwide.

In April 2015, Devnani hit the headlines with stories that reported that Isaac Newton, Pythagoras and Akbar are being eliminated from the school textbooks. "Why should our children only learn about Akbar, the Great? Why not Maharana Pratap, the Great?" he reportedly asked. "Our children are constantly learning about foreign rulers, mathematicians, scientists et al." These "foreign" scientists and intellectuals are being eliminated in favour of "local and national" heroes, Veer Savarkar, Subhas Chandra Bose, Bhagat Singh, Maharaja Suraj Mal, Aryabhata and Bhaskaracharya.

In March 2016, Devnani announced that "major changes" were being made in the school curriculum, by including the biographies of freedom fighters, so as to ensure that "no one like Kanhaiya Kumar" would be born again. In view of the events at the Jawaharlal Nehru University, he said that it was necessary to inculcate a "feeling of patriotism" in the students.

== See also ==
- Bhajan Lal Sharma ministry
- List of speakers of the Rajasthan Legislative Assembly
