= Surender Pal Singh =

Indian politician

Minister of State, Government of Rajasthan
- In office 30 December 2023 – 8 January 2024
- Governor: Kalraj Mishra
- Chief Minister: Bhajan Lal Sharma
- Ministry and Departments: List: * Agricultural Marketing (I/C); Agriculture Irrigated Area Development and Water Utility (I/C); Indira Gandhi Canal (I/C); Minority Affairs and Waqf (I/C)
- Preceded by: Murari Lal Meena
- Succeeded by: Bhajan Lal Sharma
- In office 27 October 2014 – 17 December 2018
- Chief Minister: Vasundhara Raje
- Ministry and Departments: List: Factory Boilers Inspection (I/C); Planning (I/C); Labour (I/C); Mines (I/C)
- In office 31 May 2004 – 10 December 2008
- Chief Minister: Vasundhara Raje
- Ministry and Departments: List: * Agriculture; Agricultural Marketing

Member of the Rajasthan Legislative Assembly
- In office 2013–2018
- Preceded by: Gurmeet Singh Kooner
- Succeeded by: Gurmeet Singh Kooner
- In office 2003–2008
- Preceded by: Gurmeet Singh Kooner
- Succeeded by: Gurmeet Singh Kooner
- Constituency: Karanpur

President Of BJP Ganganagar
- In office 1999–2003

Personal details
- Born: 1 January 1952 (age 74) Gulabewala, Ganganagar District, Rajasthan, India
- Party: Bharatiya Janata Party
- Spouse: Daljeet Kaur
- Children: 2
- Parent(s): Kartar Singh (father); Basant Kaur (mother)
- Education: B.A.
- Profession: agriculture

Surender Pal Singh is an Indian politician and member of the Bharatiya Janata Party from Rajasthan. He was a member of the Rajasthan Legislative Assembly from the Karanpur constituency in Rajasthan from 2003 till 2008 and again from 2013 to 2018. He was Chairman Of Rajasthan Warehousing with Cabinet Rank in 1994. He also served as Minister of Agriculture (2003-2008) and Minister of Mines and Petroleum (2013-2018). He lost his seat in the 2018 Rajasthan Legislative Assembly election to Gurmeet Singh Kooner of the Indian National Congress by a margin of 28,376 votes.

In 2023 he was the BJP candidate for Karanpur Constituency (whose election were postponed due to the sudden death of INC candidate and incumbent Gurmeet Singh Kooner just a few days before polls) and the fresh elections for the constituency were conducted on 5 January 2024 and results were declared on 8 January 2024.

Despite this Singh had taken Oath as State Minister (Independent Charge) on 30 December 2023, just a week before the by-elections (5 January 2024) in Karanpur Assembly Constituency.

However, in a recent turn of events, Congress’s Rupinder Singh Kooner emerged victorious in the bypoll, defeating BJP’s Surenderpal Singh by a margin of 11,284 votes with a total of 94,950 votes.

On December 31, State Congress unit had written to the Election Commission of India, complaining that the appointment is in total violation of the model code of conduct and asked for singh's disqualification from contesting the by-election slated for Jan. 5.
