= Jawahar Singh Bedham =

Indian politician

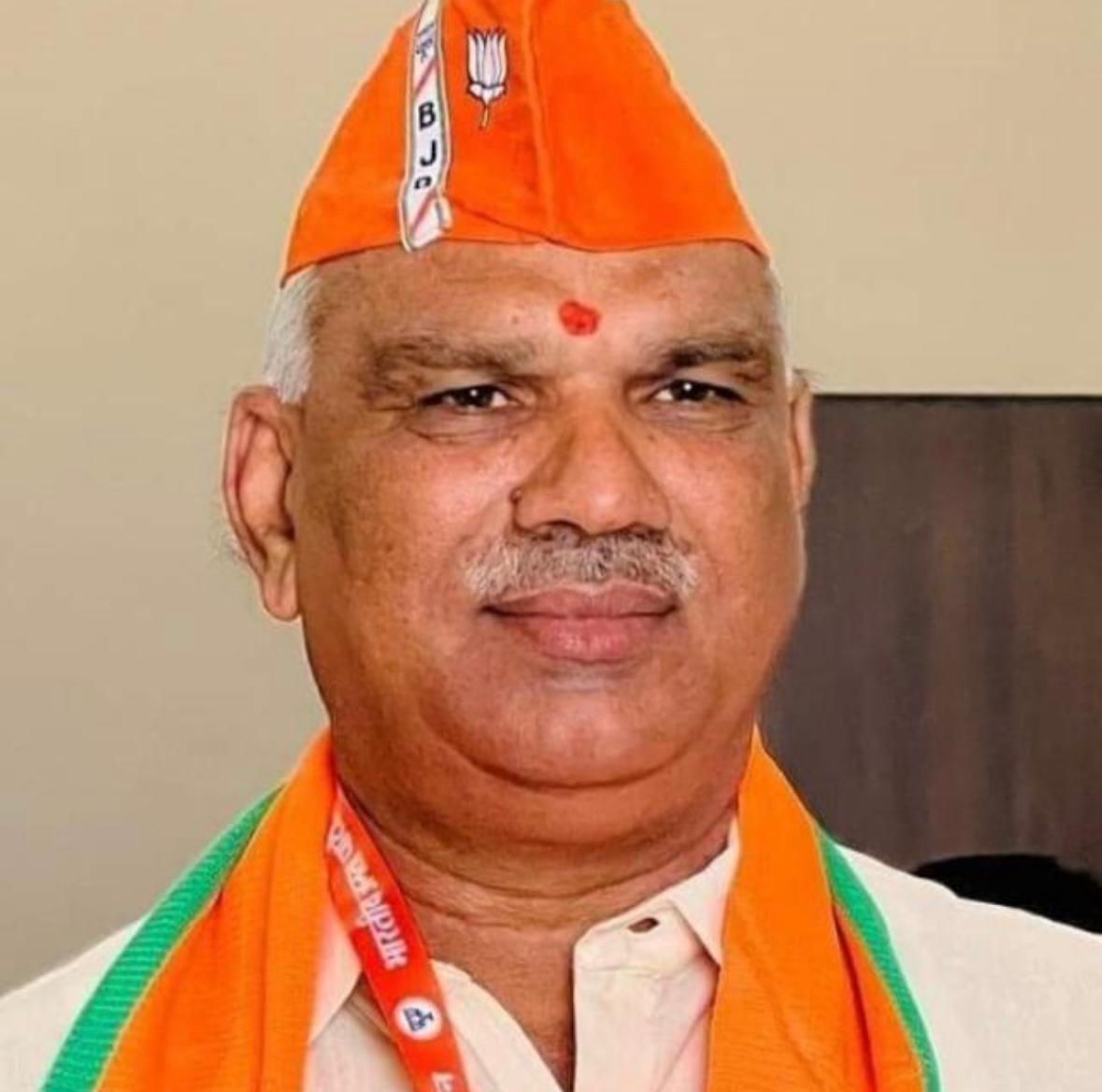

Minister of State, Government of Rajasthan
- Incumbent
- Assumed office 30 December 2023
- Governor: Haribhau Bagade
- Chief Minister: Bhajan Lal Sharma
- Ministry and Departments: List: * Home; Cow Husbandry; Animal Husbandry and Dairy; Fisheries
- Preceded by: Rajender Singh Yadav

Member of the Rajasthan Legislative Assembly
- Incumbent
- Assumed office 3 December 2023
- Preceded by: Wajib Ali
- Constituency: Nagar

Personal details
- Born: 1 September 1968 (age 57) Bedham, Deeg, Rajasthan
- Party: Bhartiya Janta Party
- Spouse: Vinita Devi
- Children: 2 Son's
- Parent(s): Samandar Singh (father); Resham Devi (mother)
- Education: B.A. & L.L.B
- Alma mater: University of Rajasthan
- Occupation: MLA
- Profession: Self-employment

Jawahar Singh Bedham (born 1 September 1968) is an Indian politician from Rajasthan. He is a Member of the Rajasthan Legislative Assembly from Nagar Assembly constituency. He won the 2023 Rajasthan Legislative Assembly election representing the Bharatiya Janata Party. He currently serves as a Minister of State in the Bhajan Lal Sharma Ministry as Home and Cow Husbandry department.

== Early life and education ==
Bedham is from Nagar, Bharatpur district, Rajasthan. He is the son of Samandar Singh. He completed his BA and LLB at University of Rajasthan, Jaipur. He is an advocate.

== Career ==
Bedham won from Nagar Assembly constituency representing the Bharatiya Janata Party in the 2023 Rajasthan Legislative Assembly election. He polled 75,579 votes and defeated his nearest rival, Wajib Ali of the Indian National Congress, by a margin of 1,531 votes. In the 2018 Rajasthan Legislative Assembly election, he contested on the BJP ticket from Kaman Assembly constituency and lost to Zahida Khan of the Indian National Congress, by a margin of 39,621 votes.

Bedham started his political career in the panchayat samiti and was a member from 1995 to 2000. Later, he served as a member of Zila Parishad from 2000 to 2005. The district BJP made his as Vice President from 2011 to 2016. He also served as a member of the State Working Committee of BJP from 2012 to 2017. During Vasundhara government, he was made as the Chairman of Dang Development Board.
