= Hemant Meena =

Indian politician

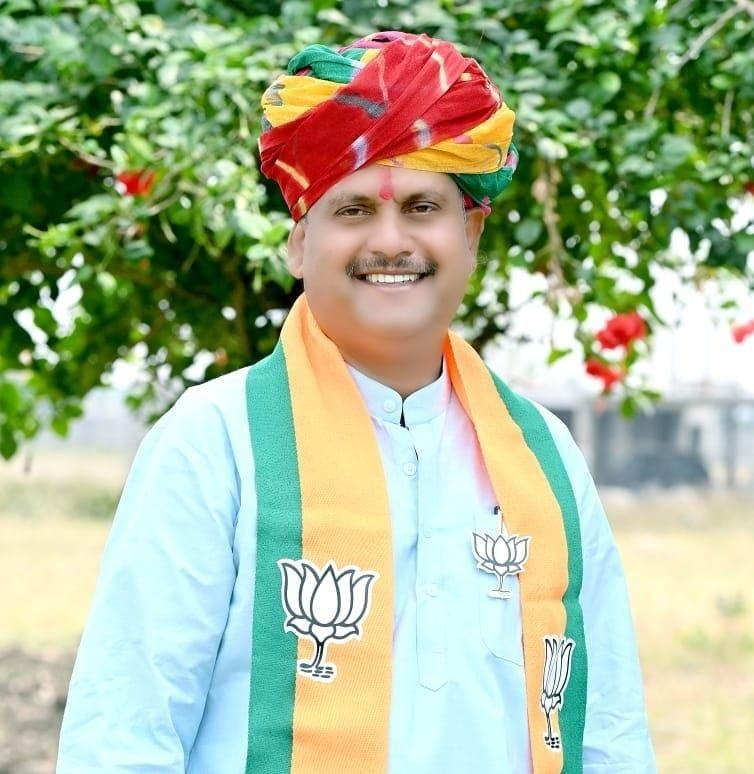

Cabinet Minister, Government of Rajasthan
- Incumbent
- Assumed office 30 December 2023
- Governor: Kalraj Mishra; Haribhau Bagade
- Chief Minister: Bhajan Lal Sharma
- Ministry and Departments: List: Revenue; Colonization
- Preceded by: Ramlal Jat

Member of the Rajasthan Legislative Assembly
- Incumbent
- Assumed office 3 December 2023
- Preceded by: Ramlal Meena
- Constituency: Pratapgarh

Personal details
- Born: 11 March 1980 (age 46) Gopalpura, Pratapgarh district, Rajasthan, India
- Party: Bharatiya Janata Party
- Spouse: Sarika Meena
- Children: 3
- Parent: Nand Lal Meena (father)
- Education: B.A.
- Alma mater: University of Rajasthan
- Occupation: Agriculturist

Hemant Meena (born 11 March 1980) is an Indian politician currently serving as a Cabinet Minister of Revenue and Colonization Department in the Government of Rajasthan. He is a member of the Rajasthan Legislative Assembly from the Pratapgarh constituency and represents the Bharatiya Janata Party.

== Political career ==
Following the 2023 Rajasthan Legislative Assembly election, he was elected as an MLA from the Pratapgarh Assembly constituency. He defeated the Indian National Congress (INC) candidate Ramlal Meena with a margin of 25,109 votes.

On 30 December 2023, Meena was sworn in as a Cabinet Minister in the presence of Governor Kalraj Mishra, Deputy Chief Minister Diya Kumari, and Prem Chand Bairwa.

== Electoral record ==
Election results
Year	Office	Constituency	Party	Votes (Hemant Meena)	%	Opponent	Opponent Party	Votes	%	Result	Ref
2023	MLA	Pratapgarh	Bharatiya Janata Party	87,644	40.03	Ramlal Meena	Indian National Congress	62,535	28.56	Won	
2018	MLA	Pratapgarh	Bharatiya Janata Party	83,945	43.12	Ramlal Meena	Indian National Congress	100,625	51.69	Lost	
