= Second Raje ministry =

Ministers in the Government of Rajasthan headed by Chief Minister Vasundhara Raje

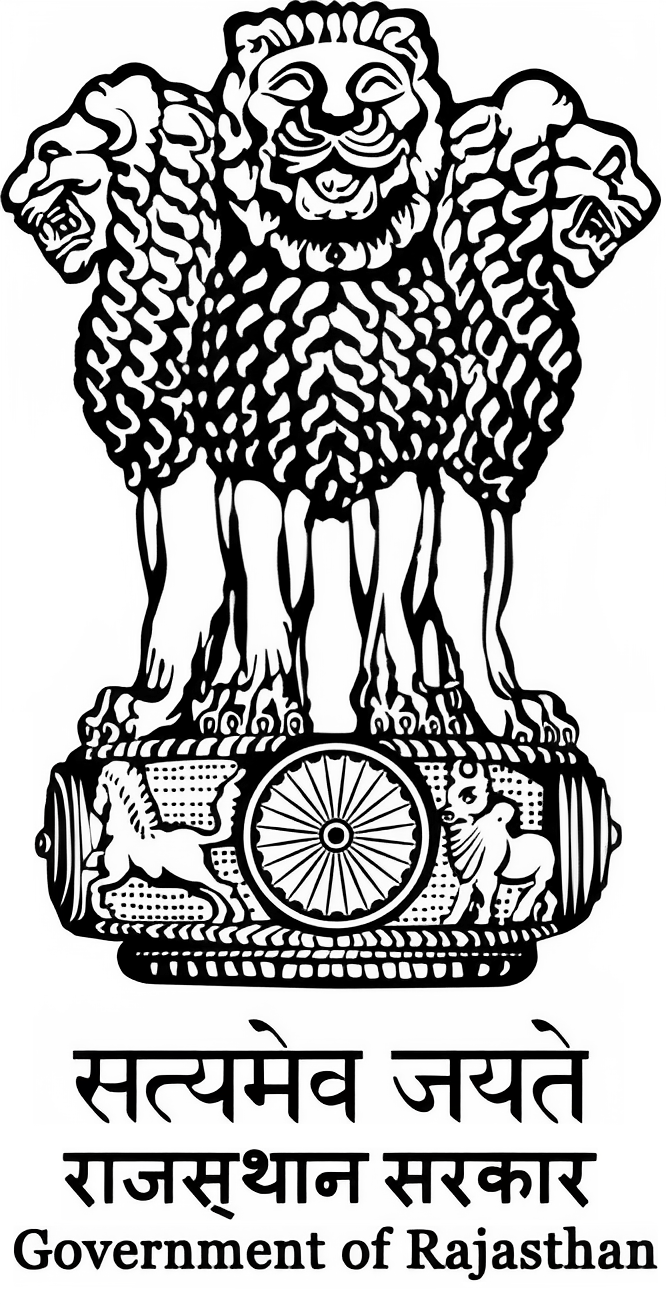
- Ministry of Rajasthan

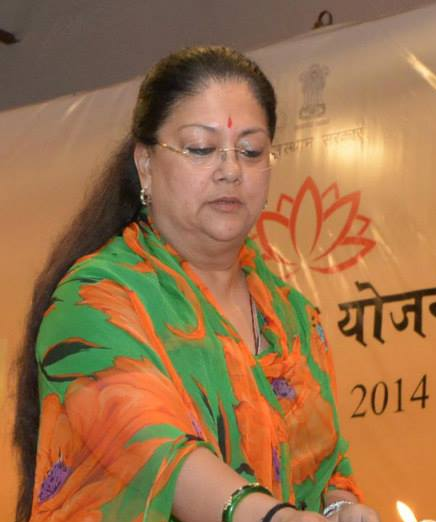
- Vasundhara Raje; Hon'ble Chief Minister of Rajasthan
- Date formed: 13 December 2013
- Date dissolved: 17 December 2018

People and organisations
- Governor: Margaret Alva; Kalyan Singh
- Chief Minister: Vasundhara Raje
- Status in legislature: Majority
- Opposition leader: Rameshwar Lal Dudi

History
- Election: 2013
- Legislature terms: 5 years, 4 days
- Predecessor: Second Gehlot ministry
- Successor: Third Gehlot ministry

The Second Raje ministry of the Government of Rajasthan was sworn in on 10 December 2016.

== Council of Ministers ==
=== Cabinet Ministers ===
Portfolio	Minister	Took office	Left office	Party
Chief Minister; Personnel; Rajasthan State Bureau of Investigation (ACB); Finance; Taxation; Excise; Planning; Statistics; Cabinet Secretariat; Policy Formulation Cell - CM Secretariat; Information & Public Relation; Information Technology and Communications; Energy; Public Grievances; Administrative Reforms and Coordination; Law & Legal Affairs and Legal Consultancy Office	Vasundhara Raje	12 December 2013	17 December 2018	BJP
Home and Justice; Disaster Management and Relief; Prison, Home Guard & Civil Defense	Gulab Chand Kataria	20 December 2013	11 December 2018	BJP
Tribal Area Development	Nand Lal Meena	20 December 2013	11 December 2018	BJP
Rural Development and Panchayati raj Parliamentary Affairs; Election	Rajendra Singh Rathore	20 December 2013	11 December 2018	BJP
Chief Whip	Kalu Lal Gurjar	20 December 2013	11 December 2018	BJP
Medical and Health; Medical and Health Services (ESI); Medical Education; Ayurveda & Indian Medical Methods	Kali Charan Saraf	12 December 2016	11 December 2018	BJP
Agriculture; Fisheries; Garden	Prabhu Lal Saini	20 December 2013	11 December 2018	BJP
Forest; Environment; Youth Affairs and Sports	Gajendra Singh Khimsar	20 December 2013	11 December 2018	BJP
Public Works Department; Transport	Yunus Khan	20 December 2013	11 December 2018	BJP
Technical Education; Higher Education; Sanskrit Education; Science & Technology	Kiran Maheshwari	20 December 2013	11 December 2018	BJP
Public Health Engineering; Ground Water	Surendra Goyal	20 December 2013	11 December 2018	BJP
Water Resources; Indira Gandhi Canal	Ram Pratap Sahu	20 December 2013	11 December 2018	BJP
Industry; NRI; Public Enterprise; DMIC	Rajpal Singh Shekhawat	20 December 2013	11 December 2018	BJP
Social Justice & Empowerment; Minority Affairs; Waqf	Arun Chaturvedi	20 December 2013	11 December 2018	BJP
Rajasthan State Motor Garage; General Administration; Estates; Printing and Stationery	Hem Singh Bhadana	20 December 2013	11 December 2018	BJP
Co-Operative; Gopalan	Ajay Singh Kilak	20 December 2013	11 December 2018	BJP
Food & Civil Supply; Consumer Affairs	Baboo Lal Verma	20 December 2013	11 December 2018	BJP
Autonomous Bodies; Urban Development & Housing	Shrichand Kriplani	20 December 2013	11 December 2018	BJP
Labour and Employment; Factory and Boilers Inspection	Jaswant Singh Yadav	20 December 2013	11 December 2018	BJP

=== Ministers of state Independent Charge ===
Portfolio	Minister	Took office	Left office	Party
Minister of Social Justice & Empowerment	Arun Chaturvedi	20 December 2013	28 October 2014	BJP
Minister of Food, Civil Supplies & Consumer Affairs	Hem Singh Bhadana	20 December 2013	28 October 2014	BJP
Minister of Cooperation	Ajay Singh Kilak	20 December 2013	10 December 2016	BJP
Minister of Revenue	Amra Ram Choudhary	28 October 2014	17 December 2018	BJP
Minister of Devasthan	Amra Ram Choudhary	28 October 2014	10 December 2016	BJP
Minister of Devasthan	Raj Kumar Rinwa	10 December 2016	17 December 2018	BJP
Minister of Tourism; Minister of Art & Culture	Krishnendra Kaur (Deepa)	28 October 2014	17 December 2018	BJP
Minister of Primary & Secondary Education	Vasudev Devnani	28 October 2014	17 December 2018	BJP
Minister of Women & Child Development	Anita Bhadel	28 October 2014	17 December 2018	BJP
Minister of Environment & Forest	Raj Kumar Rinwa	28 October 2014	10 December 2016	BJP
Minister of Mining	Raj Kumar Rinwa	28 October 2014	10 December 2016	BJP
Minister of Mining	Surender Pal Singh	10 December 2016	17 December 2018	BJP
Minister of Labour & Employment	Surender Pal Singh	28 October 2014	10 December 2016	BJP

=== Ministers of state ===
Portfolio	Minister	Took office	Left office	Party
Minister of Energy	Pushpendra Singh	28 October 2014	17 December 2018	BJP
Minister of Animal Husbandry & Dairying	Otaram Dewasi	28 October 2014	17 December 2018	BJP
Minister of Transport	Baboo Lal Verma	28 October 2014	10 December 2016	BJP
Minister of General Administration	Jeetmal Khant	28 October 2014	10 December 2016	BJP
Minister of Law & Parliamentary Affairs	Arjun Lal Garg	28 October 2014	10 December 2016	BJP
Minister of Rural Development & Panchayati Raj; Minister of Parliamentary Affairs	Dhan Singh Rawat	10 December 2016	17 December 2018	BJP
Minister of Health & Family Welfare; Minister of Medical Education	Banshidhar Bajiya	10 December 2016	17 December 2018	BJP
Minister of Public Health Engineering Department	Sushil Katara	10 December 2016	17 December 2018	BJP
Minister of Tribal Area Development	Kamsa Meghwal	10 December 2016	17 December 2018	BJP
