= First Raje ministry =

Government of Rajasthan, India from 2003 to 2008

- Ministry of Rajasthan
- Date formed: 8 December 2003
- Date dissolved: 11 December 2008

People and organisations
- Chief Minister: Vasundhara Raje
- Member parties: BJP
- Status in legislature: Majority government

History
- Predecessor: First Gehlot ministry
- Successor: Second Gehlot ministry

Vasundhara Raje was sworn in as Chief Minister of Rajasthan on 8 December 2003. She was elected as the leader of the Bharatiya Janata Party in the Rajasthan Legislative Assembly and remained chief minister until 11 December 2008. The following is the list of ministers:

== Council of Ministers ==
Name	Office	Portfolio	Took office	Left office	Party
Vasundhara Raje	Chief Minister	Finance and Taxation; Planning; Personnel; Program Implementation; Public Grievance; Energy; NRI's; Anti-Corruption Bureau; Others	8 December 2003	11 December 2008	BJP
Gulab Chand Kataria	Cabinet Minister	Home Affairs	8 December 2003	11 December 2008	BJP
Ghanshyam Tiwari	Cabinet Minister	Food and Civil Supplies	8 December 2003	11 December 2008	BJP
Prof. Sanwar Lal Jat	Cabinet Minister	Irrigation; Indira Gandhi Nahar Pariyojna; PHED; CAD	8 December 2003	11 December 2008	BJP
Kirodi Mal Meena	Cabinet Minister	Food and Supply	8 December 2003	11 December 2008	BJP
Madan Dilawar	Cabinet Minister	Social Welfare	8 December 2003	11 December 2008	BJP
Narpat Singh Rajvi	Cabinet Minister	Medical and Health; Family Welfare; Industries; Labour and Employment	8 December 2003	11 December 2008	BJP
Yunus Khan	Cabinet Minister	Transport; Youth and Sports	8 December 2003	11 December 2008	BJP
Kanak Mal Katara	Cabinet Minister	Woman and Child Development; Tribal Area Development; GAD	8 December 2003	11 December 2008	BJP
Prabhu Lal Saini	Cabinet Minister	Agriculture; Animal Husbandry	8 December 2003	11 December 2008	BJP
Laxmi Narayan Dave	Cabinet Minister	Forest; Environment; Mines	8 December 2003	11 December 2008	BJP
Dr. Digamber Singh	Cabinet Minister	Industries	8 December 2003	11 December 2008	BJP
Rajendra Singh Rathore	Cabinet Minister	Public Works; Parliamentary Affairs	8 December 2003	11 December 2008	BJP
Ram Narayan Dudi	Cabinet Minister	Revenue; Colonisation; Soldier Welfare	8 December 2003	11 December 2008	BJP
Kalu Lal Gurjar	Cabinet Minister	Rural Development	8 December 2003	11 December 2008	BJP
Nathu Singh Gurjar	Cabinet Minister	Cooperative	8 December 2003	11 December 2008	BJP
Ram Kishore Meena	Cabinet Minister	Labour	8 December 2003	11 December 2008	BJP
Nand Lal Meena	Cabinet Minister	Tribal Area Development	8 December 2003	11 December 2008	BJP
Kali Charan Saraf	Cabinet Minister	Primary, Secondary and Higher Education	8 December 2003	11 December 2008	BJP
Devi Singh Bhati	Cabinet Minister		8 December 2003	11 December 2008	BJP
Pratap Singh Singhavi	Minister of State with independent charge	Forest	8 December 2003	11 December 2008	
Surerndra Goyal	Minister of State with independent charge	Urban Development and Housing; Local Self Government	8 December 2003	11 December 2008	
Amra Ram Choudhary	Minister of State	Home	8 December 2003	11 December 2008	
Babu Lal Verma	Minister of State	Rural Development and Panchayati Raj	8 December 2003	11 December 2008	
Bhawani Joshi	Minister of State	Medical and Health	8 December 2003	11 December 2008	
Surendra Pal Singh TT	Minister of State	Agriculture	8 December 2003	11 December 2008	
Usha Punia	Minister of State	Tourism; Art and Culture; Devasthan	8 December 2003	11 December 2008	
Vasudev Devnani	Minister of State	Primary, Secondary and Higher Education; Sanskrit Education; Language and Minority Language; Technical Education	8 December 2003	11 December 2008	
Surendra Singh Rathore	Minister of State	Irrigation	8 December 2003	11 December 2008	
Khema Ram Meghawal	Minister of State	Mines	8 December 2003	11 December 2008	
Gajendra Singh Kheenvsar	Minister of State	Energy	8 December 2003	11 December 2008	
Chunni Lal Dhakar	Minister of State		8 December 2003	11 December 2008	
Virendra Meena	Minister of State		8 December 2003	11 December 2008	

== See also ==
- Vasundhara Raje ministry (2013–)
