= Second Gehlot ministry =

Rajasthan state ministry headed by Ashok Gehlot from 2008 to 2013

Second Ashok Gehlot ministry
- Ministry of Rajasthan
- 2008–2013
- Date established: 13 December 2008
- Date dissolved: 13 December 2013

Leadership and composition
- Chief Minister: Ashok Gehlot
- Member party: Indian National Congress; Independents
- Status in legislature: Minority government at formation, supported by independent legislators
- Opposition party: Bharatiya Janata Party

Formation and history
- Election: 2008 Rajasthan Legislative Assembly election
- Legislature term: 13th Rajasthan Assembly
- Predecessor: First Raje ministry
- Successor: Second Raje ministry

The Second Ashok Gehlot ministry was the Council of Ministers of the Government of Rajasthan headed by Ashok Gehlot. It was in office from 13 December 2008 until 13 December 2013 during the term of the 13th Rajasthan Assembly.

The ministry was formed after the 2008 Rajasthan Legislative Assembly election, in which the Indian National Congress won 96 of the 200 seats and emerged as the largest party without securing an absolute majority. The Congress formed the government with the support of independent members of the Legislative Assembly.

Gehlot was sworn in as chief minister on 13 December 2008. Eleven cabinet ministers and two ministers of state were inducted on 19 December 2008. The ministry was expanded by ten ministers on 28 February 2009 and by four ministers of state on 10 December 2009.

A major reshuffle took place on 16 November 2011. Five ministers were dropped, six were inducted, and Ashok Bairwa was promoted to cabinet rank. The portfolio allocation recorded after the reshuffle comprised 13 cabinet ministers and 14 ministers of state in addition to the chief minister.

== Formation ==
The Congress legislature party selected Gehlot to head the government after the 2008 election. Governor S. K. Singh administered the oath of office to him on 13 December 2008. Gehlot initially took office without other ministers.

The first expansion was held on 19 December. The eleven cabinet ministers inducted were Aimaduddin Ahmad Khan, Bharat Singh, Beena Kak, Brijkishore Sharma, Harji Ram Burdak, Hema Ram Chaudhary, Mahendrajeet Singh Malviya, Mahipal Maderna, Bhanwarlal Meghwal, Parsadi Lal Meena and Shanti Kumar Dhariwal. Golma Devi and Ramkishore Saini were inducted as ministers of state.

== Expansions and reshuffle ==
=== February 2009 expansion ===
On 28 February 2009, Jitendra Singh and Rajendra Pareek were inducted as cabinet ministers. Babulal Nagar, Ram Lal Jat, Ameen Khan, Mangi Lal Garasia, Bharosi Lal Jatav, Pramod Jain Bhaya, Ashok Bairwa and Gurmeet Singh Kunnar were inducted as ministers of state. Portfolios were allocated on 2 March 2009.

=== December 2009 expansion ===
On 10 December 2009, Brijendra Singh Ola, Murari Lal Meena, Rajkumar Sharma and Rajendra Singh Gudha were inducted as ministers of state. Murari Lal Meena, Rajkumar Sharma and Rajendra Singh Gudha had been elected as Bahujan Samaj Party candidates before joining the Congress. Their initial portfolios were allocated on 15 December 2009.

=== November 2011 reshuffle ===
Water Resources Minister Mahipal Maderna was removed from the council on 16 October 2011. On 14 November, all members of the council submitted their resignations to Gehlot to enable a reshuffle.

The reconstituted ministry was sworn in on 16 November. Bhanwarlal Meghwal, Ram Lal Jat, Pramod Jain Bhaya, Bharosi Lal Jatav and Golma Devi were dropped. Ameen Khan, who had resigned on 10 February 2011, was re-inducted. Virendra Beniwal, Dayaram Parmar, Naseem Akhtar Insaf, Vinod Kumar Lilawali and Manju Devi Meghwal were also inducted, while Ashok Bairwa was promoted from minister of state to cabinet minister.

== Council of Ministers ==
S.No	Name	Constituency	Department	Party
1.	Ashok Gehlot; Chief Minister	Sardarpura	Finance and Taxation; Planning; Personnel; Administrative Reforms and Coordination; Home; Cabinet Secretariat; General Administration; Information Technology and Communication; Civil Aviation; Khadi and Rural Industries; Social Justice and Empowerment; Programme Implementation; Rajasthan State Investigation Bureau; Other departments not allocated to any Minister	INC
Cabinet Ministers
2.	Aimaduddin Ahmad Khan (Duru Miyan)	Kishanpole	Medical and Health; Family Welfare; Ayurveda; Medical Education	INC
3.	Bharat Singh Kundanpur	Sangod	Public Works; Rural Development and Panchayati Raj	INC
4.	Beena Kak	Sumerpur	Tourism; Art and Culture; Archaeology; Printing and Stationery; Women and Child Development; Forest and Environment	INC
5.	Brijkishore Sharma	Hawa Mahal	Primary and Secondary Education; Sanskrit Education; Language and Linguistic Minorities; Devasthan	INC
6.	Harji Ram Burdak	Nawan	Agriculture; Animal Husbandry; Fisheries	IND
7.	Hema Ram Chaudhary	Gudamalani	Revenue; Colonisation; Water Resources; Sainik Welfare	INC
8.	Mahendrajeet Singh Malviya	Bagidora	Tribal Area Development; Rural Development and Panchayati Raj	INC
9.	Shanti Dhariwal	Kota North	Urban Development and Housing; Local Self Government; Law and Justice; Parliamentary Affairs; Elections	INC
10.	Jitendra Singh	Khetri	Energy; Non-conventional Energy Sources; Public Health Engineering; Ground Water; Information Technology and Communication; Information and Public Relations	INC
11.	Rajendra Pareek	Sikar	Industries; Non-resident Indians; Public Undertakings; Economics and Statistics; Excise; Mines	INC
12.	Parsadi Lal Meena	Lalsot	Cooperation; Food and Civil Supplies	IND
13.	Mahipal Maderna	Osian	Water Resources; Indira Gandhi Canal Project; Public Health Engineering; Ground Water; Command Area Development	INC
14.	Bhanwarlal Meghwal	Sujangarh	Labour and Employment; Primary and Secondary Education	INC
15.	Golma Devi	Mahwa	Khadi and Village Industries; Home Guard and Civil Defence	IND
16.	Ramkishore Saini	Bassi	Jails; Social Justice and Empowerment; Technical and Engineering Education; Public Grievance Redressal; Devasthan	IND
17.	Gurmeet Singh Kunnar	Karanpur	Agricultural Marketing; Water Resources	IND
18.	Ameen Khan	Sheo	Minority Affairs; Waqf	INC
19.	Babulal Nagar	Dudu	Khadi and Village Industries; Dairy Development	INC
20.	Bharosi Lal Jatav	Hindaun	Agriculture; Animal Husbandry; Fisheries; Estate; Motor Garage	INC
21.	Ashok Bairwa	Khandar	Social Justice and Empowerment; Transport; Elections	INC
22.	Mangi Lal Garasia	Pindwara-Abu	Factory and Boiler Inspection; Labour and Employment; Youth Affairs and Sports	INC
23.	Pramod Jain Bhaya	Anta	Public Works; Science and Technology	INC
24.	Ram Lal Jat	Mandal	Forest and Environment; Mines	INC
25.	Brijendra Singh Ola	Jhunjhunu	Disaster Management and Relief; Cooperation; Indira Gandhi Canal Project; Command Area Development; Sainik Welfare	INC
26.	Murari Lal Meena	Dausa	Employees' State Insurance; Agricultural Technical Education; Motor Garage; Estate; State Insurance; Public Works	INC
27.	Rajkumar Sharma	Nawalgarh	Science and Technology; Medical and Health; Family Welfare; Ayurveda; Medical Education	INC
28.	Rajendra Singh Gudha	Udaipurwati	Planning (Manpower); Home Guard and Civil Defence; Public Undertakings; Economics and Statistics	INC
29.	Virendra Beniwal	Lunkaransar	Transport; Home	INC
30.	Dayaram Parmar	Kotra	Higher Education	INC
31.	Naseem Akhtar Insaf	Pushkar	Primary and Secondary Education; Language and Linguistic Minorities	INC
32.	Vinod Kumar Lilawali	Nimbahera	Rural Development and Panchayati Raj; Agriculture; Animal Husbandry; Fisheries	INC
33.	Manju Devi Meghwal	Nawa	Women and Child Development	INC

Babulal Nagar tendered his resignation on 19 September 2013. Gehlot accepted it and forwarded it to the governor on 20 September.

== End of the ministry ==
The Bharatiya Janata Party won the 2013 Rajasthan Legislative Assembly election, and the Congress government left office. Vasundhara Raje was sworn in as chief minister on 13 December 2013, succeeding Gehlot.

== See also ==
- Ashok Gehlot
- Government of Rajasthan
- First Ashok Gehlot ministry
- Third Ashok Gehlot ministry
- 13th Rajasthan Assembly
- List of chief ministers of Rajasthan
