= Saraswati Shloka =

Hindu hymn

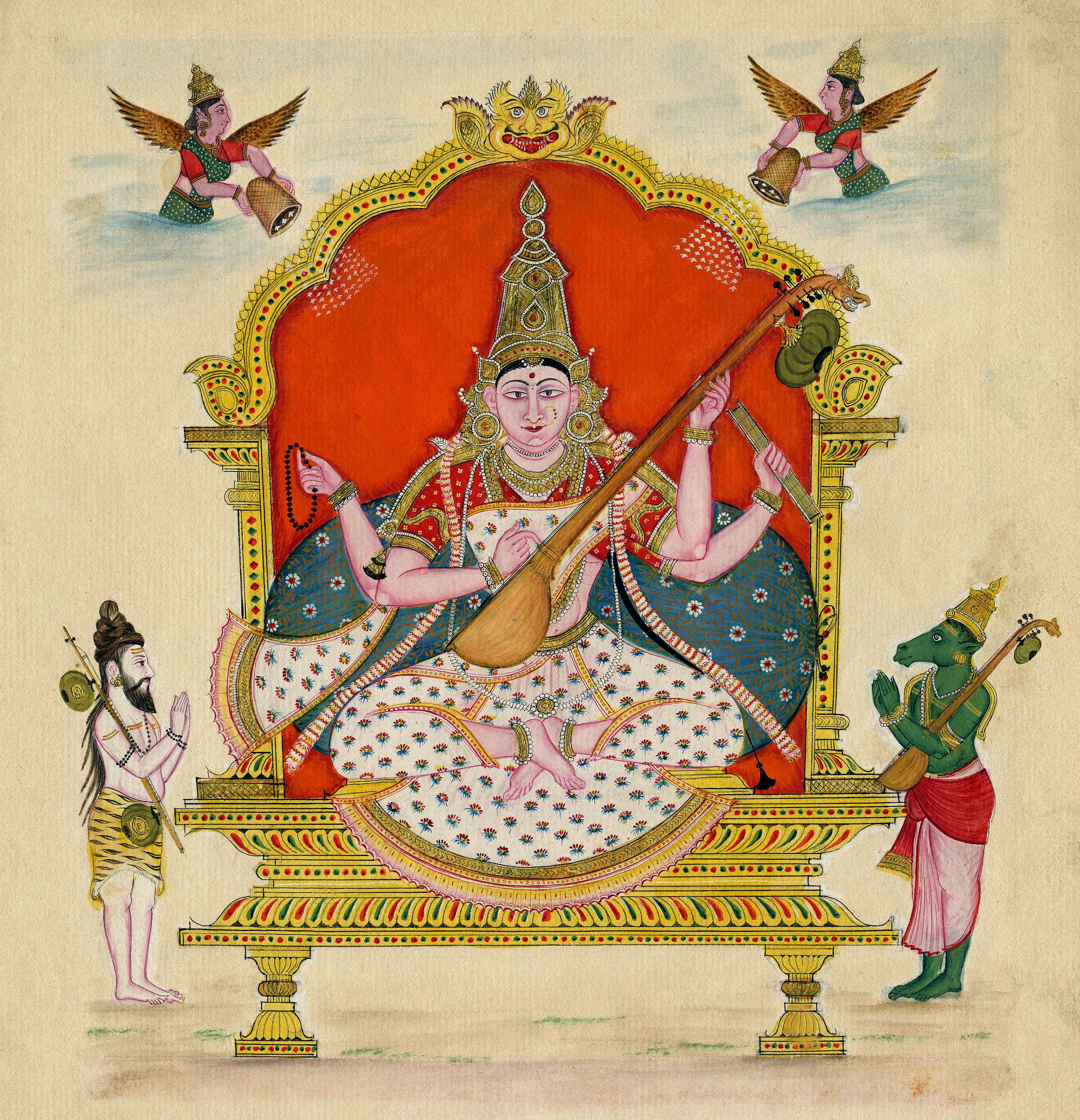
South Indian painting of Saraswati, the addressee of this hymn

The Saraswati Shloka (Sanskrit: सरस्वती श्लोक, romanized: Sarasvatī Śloka) is a Hindu prayer. It is traditionally chanted by a student before their commencement of studies. It is addressed to Saraswati, the Hindu goddess of learning and knowledge.

== Hymn ==
The hymn is composed of the following two verses:

sarasvatī namastubhyaṃ varade kāmarūpiṇī |
vidyārambhaṃ kariṣyāmi siddhirbhavatu me sadā | |

O Saraswati; salutations to you; you who offers boons; you who takes the form of desires. As I begin my studies, may there always be accomplishment for me.

== Variations ==
Variations of this shloka include:

1.

sarasvatī namastubhyaṃ
varade jñānarūpiṇī
vidyārambhaṃ kariṣyāmi
vinayatbhavatu me sadā

2.

sarasvatī namastubhyaṃ
varade vijñānarūpiṇī
vidyārambhaṃ kariṣyāmi
vinayatbhavatu me sadā

3.

sarasvatī namastubhyaṃ
varade jñānavijñānarūpiṇī
vidyārambhaṃ kariṣyāmi
vinayatbhavatu me sadā

== See also ==
- Saraswati Vandana Mantra
- Trikaranasuddhi
