= Hem Singh Bhadana =

Indian politician (1966–2026)

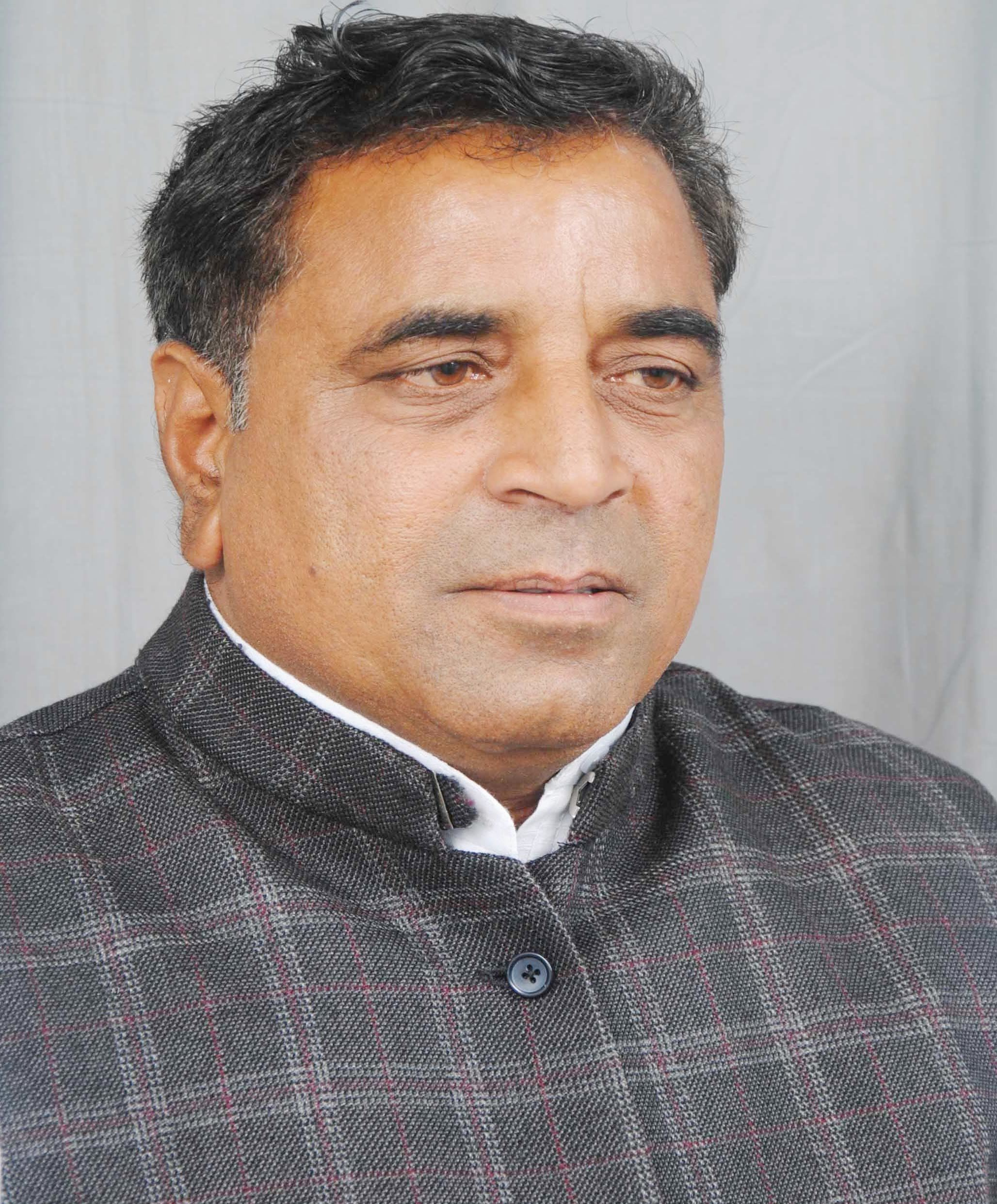

Member of the Rajasthan Legislative Assembly
- In office 2013–2018
- Succeeded by: Kanti Prasad Meena
- Constituency: Thanagazi

Personal details
- Born: 1966 Kishangarh Bas, Alwar, Rajasthan, India
- Died: 2 February 2026 (aged 59) Alwar, Rajasthan, India
- Party: Bharatiya Janata Party
- Occupation: Politician

Hem Singh Bhadana (1966 – 2 February 2026) was an Indian politician who served as a Member of the Rajasthan Legislative Assembly representing the Thanagazi.

== Life and political career ==
Hem Singh Bhadana was born in 1966 in Kishangarh Bas, Alwar, Rajasthan, India. He was the son of Hardevi Bhadana, and her husband, Shyonarayan. Before entering his career on politics, he was involved in student politics. He held a law degree in Alwar and later graduated in University of Rajasthan.

In 2008, Bhadana became a member of the Bharatiya Janata Party and was elected twice as a member of the Rajasthan Legislative Assembly from the Thanagazi assembly constituency in Alwar.

Bhadana was re-elected in 2013, during his second term, he was inducted into the Vasundhara Raje-led state government, first as a Minister of State and then later as a Cabinet Minister. He also held additional charge of General Administration. He lost at the 2023 Rajasthan Assembly election to Kanti Prasad Meena.

Bhadana died from cancer in Alwar on 2 February 2026, at the age of 59.

== Personal life ==
Bhadana was married to Krishna Devi. They had two daughters and two son. one of them is Surendra Bhadana, a famous politician.
