= First Gehlot ministry =

Rajasthan state ministry headed by Ashok Gehlot from 1998 to 2003

First Ashok Gehlot ministry
- Ministry of Rajasthan
- 1998–2003
- Date formed: 1 December 1998
- Date dissolved: 8 December 2003

People and organisations
- Chief Minister: Ashok Gehlot
- Member party: Indian National Congress
- Status in legislature: Majority government
- Opposition party: Bharatiya Janata Party

History
- Election: 1998 Rajasthan Legislative Assembly election
- Legislature term: 11th Rajasthan Assembly
- Predecessor: Third Shekhawat ministry
- Successor: First Raje ministry

The First Ashok Gehlot ministry was the Council of Ministers of the Government of Rajasthan headed by Ashok Gehlot. It was formed on 1 December 1998 following the 1998 Rajasthan Legislative Assembly election and remained in office until 8 December 2003.

The ministry was initially expanded on 5 December 1998, when 18 cabinet ministers and 13 ministers of state were sworn in. A major expansion on 13 May 2002 added four cabinet ministers and eleven ministers of state, while Hira Lal Indora and Parsadi Lal Meena were promoted from minister of state to cabinet rank.

In January 2003, Gehlot re-inducted Ram Singh Vishnoi and reshuffled several ministerial portfolios. Banwari Lal Bairwa and Kamla Beniwal were designated deputy chief ministers.

== Formation ==
Gehlot was sworn in as chief minister on 1 December 1998. At the time, he was a member of the Lok Sabha and president of the Rajasthan Pradesh Congress Committee. On 5 December, acting governor N. L. Tibrewal administered the oath of office to 31 ministers at Raj Bhavan, Jaipur. The initial council consisted of 18 cabinet ministers and 13 ministers of state.

== May 2002 expansion ==
On 13 May 2002, Governor Anshuman Singh administered the oath of office to 15 new ministers. Govind Singh Gurjar, Ram Narayan Chaudhary, Janardan Singh Gehlot and Madho Singh Diwan were inducted as cabinet ministers. Eleven other legislators were inducted as ministers of state. Hira Lal Indora and Parsadi Lal Meena, who had served as ministers of state since December 1998, were promoted to cabinet rank.

The expansion increased the strength of the ministry to 44 members. Mamta Sharma and Vijay Laxmi Vishnoi were appointed parliamentary secretaries, but were not members of the Council of Ministers.

== January 2003 reshuffle ==
In January 2003, Gehlot reshuffled several portfolios. Banwari Lal Bairwa, who held the transport portfolio, received additional responsibility for planning and human resources and was designated deputy chief minister. Kamla Beniwal, the irrigation minister, was also designated deputy chief minister and retained additional charge of revenue.

Ram Singh Vishnoi was re-inducted into the cabinet and assigned agriculture. Govind Singh Gurjar moved from agriculture to panchayati raj. Shanti Dhariwal was assigned tourism, art and culture, while B. D. Kalla received education, medical and health, personnel and administrative reforms. Madho Singh Diwan was assigned women and child development, policy planning and information technology. C. P. Joshi retained public health engineering, ground water, economics and statistics.

Among the ministers of state, Taqiuddin Ahmed received independent charge of local self government. Paras Ram Mordia received additional charge of home, Jitendra Singh was assigned revenue and Habibur Rahman was assigned tourism.

== Council of Ministers ==
The table lists each documented appointment or portfolio period as a separate row. The surviving online reports identify all ministers appointed in December 1998 and May 2002, but do not provide a complete portfolio allocation for every minister. Portfolio descriptions are therefore included only where they are explicitly stated in the cited sources.

Appointments to the First Ashok Gehlot ministry
Name	Office	Portfolio	Party	Took office	Left office
Ashok Gehlot	Chief Minister	Departments not otherwise allocated	INC	1 December 1998	26 January 2003
Ashok Gehlot	Chief Minister	Departments not otherwise allocated	INC	26 January 2003	8 December 2003
Banwari Lal Bairwa	Cabinet Minister	Portfolio not specified in the cited swearing-in report	INC	5 December 1998	13 May 2002
Banwari Lal Bairwa	Cabinet Minister	Portfolio continued or subsequently reassigned; see January 2003 entries where documented	INC	13 May 2002	8 December 2003
B. D. Kalla	Cabinet Minister	Portfolio not specified in the cited swearing-in report	INC	5 December 1998	13 May 2002
B. D. Kalla	Cabinet Minister	Portfolio continued or subsequently reassigned; see January 2003 entries where documented	INC	13 May 2002	8 December 2003
Bhikha Bhai	Cabinet Minister	Portfolio not specified in the cited swearing-in report	INC	5 December 1998	13 May 2002
Bhikha Bhai	Cabinet Minister	Portfolio continued or subsequently reassigned; see January 2003 entries where documented	INC	13 May 2002	8 December 2003
Bhoga Lal Bakolia	Cabinet Minister	Portfolio not specified in the cited swearing-in report	INC	5 December 1998	13 May 2002
Bhoga Lal Bakolia	Cabinet Minister	Portfolio continued or subsequently reassigned; see January 2003 entries where documented	INC	13 May 2002	8 December 2003
Chandanmal Baid	Cabinet Minister	Portfolio not specified in the cited swearing-in report	INC	5 December 1998	13 May 2002
Chandanmal Baid	Cabinet Minister	Portfolio continued or subsequently reassigned; see January 2003 entries where documented	INC	13 May 2002	8 December 2003
C. P. Joshi	Cabinet Minister	Portfolio not specified in the cited swearing-in report	INC	5 December 1998	13 May 2002
C. P. Joshi	Cabinet Minister	Portfolio continued or subsequently reassigned; see January 2003 entries where documented	INC	13 May 2002	8 December 2003
Chandrabhan Singh	Cabinet Minister	Portfolio not specified in the cited swearing-in report	INC	5 December 1998	13 May 2002
Chandrabhan Singh	Cabinet Minister	Portfolio continued or subsequently reassigned; see January 2003 entries where documented	INC	13 May 2002	8 December 2003
Gulab Singh Shaktawat	Cabinet Minister	Portfolio not specified in the cited swearing-in report	INC	5 December 1998	13 May 2002
Gulab Singh Shaktawat	Cabinet Minister	Portfolio continued or subsequently reassigned; see January 2003 entries where documented	INC	13 May 2002	8 December 2003
Harendra Mirdha	Cabinet Minister	Portfolio not specified in the cited swearing-in report	INC	5 December 1998	13 May 2002
Harendra Mirdha	Cabinet Minister	Portfolio continued or subsequently reassigned; see January 2003 entries where documented	INC	13 May 2002	8 December 2003
Kamla Beniwal	Cabinet Minister	Portfolio not specified in the cited swearing-in report	INC	5 December 1998	13 May 2002
Kamla Beniwal	Cabinet Minister	Portfolio continued or subsequently reassigned; see January 2003 entries where documented	INC	13 May 2002	8 December 2003
Khet Singh Rathore	Cabinet Minister	Portfolio not specified in the cited swearing-in report	INC	5 December 1998	13 May 2002
Khet Singh Rathore	Cabinet Minister	Portfolio continued or subsequently reassigned; see January 2003 entries where documented	INC	13 May 2002	8 December 2003
Kishan Motwani	Cabinet Minister	Portfolio not specified in the cited swearing-in report	INC	5 December 1998	13 May 2002
Kishan Motwani	Cabinet Minister	Portfolio continued or subsequently reassigned; see January 2003 entries where documented	INC	13 May 2002	8 December 2003
Pradhyuman Singh	Cabinet Minister	Portfolio not specified in the cited swearing-in report	INC	5 December 1998	13 May 2002
Pradhyuman Singh	Cabinet Minister	Portfolio continued or subsequently reassigned; see January 2003 entries where documented	INC	13 May 2002	8 December 2003
Ram Singh Vishnoi	Cabinet Minister	Portfolio not specified in the cited swearing-in report	INC	5 December 1998	13 May 2002
Ram Singh Vishnoi	Cabinet Minister	Portfolio continued or subsequently reassigned; see January 2003 entries where documented	INC	13 May 2002	8 December 2003
Shanti Dhariwal	Cabinet Minister	Portfolio not specified in the cited swearing-in report	INC	5 December 1998	13 May 2002
Shanti Dhariwal	Cabinet Minister	Portfolio continued or subsequently reassigned; see January 2003 entries where documented	INC	13 May 2002	8 December 2003
Tayyab Hussain	Cabinet Minister	Portfolio not specified in the cited swearing-in report	INC	5 December 1998	13 May 2002
Tayyab Hussain	Cabinet Minister	Portfolio continued or subsequently reassigned; see January 2003 entries where documented	INC	13 May 2002	8 December 2003
Zakia Inam	Cabinet Minister	Portfolio not specified in the cited swearing-in report	INC	5 December 1998	13 May 2002
Zakia Inam	Cabinet Minister	Portfolio continued or subsequently reassigned; see January 2003 entries where documented	INC	13 May 2002	8 December 2003
Ram Kishan Verma	Cabinet Minister	Portfolio not specified in the cited swearing-in report	INC	5 December 1998	13 May 2002
Ram Kishan Verma	Cabinet Minister	Portfolio continued or subsequently reassigned; see January 2003 entries where documented	INC	13 May 2002	8 December 2003
Abdul Aziz	Minister of State	Portfolio not specified in the cited swearing-in report	INC	5 December 1998	13 May 2002
Abdul Aziz	Minister of State	Portfolio continued or subsequently reassigned	INC	13 May 2002	8 December 2003
Bhagraj Chowdhury	Minister of State	Portfolio not specified in the cited swearing-in report	INC	5 December 1998	13 May 2002
Bhagraj Chowdhury	Minister of State	Portfolio continued or subsequently reassigned	INC	13 May 2002	8 December 2003
Bina Kak	Minister of State	Portfolio not specified in the cited swearing-in report	INC	5 December 1998	13 May 2002
Bina Kak	Minister of State	Portfolio continued or subsequently reassigned	INC	13 May 2002	8 December 2003
Chandrashekhar	Minister of State	Portfolio not specified in the cited swearing-in report	INC	5 December 1998	13 May 2002
Chandrashekhar	Minister of State	Portfolio continued or subsequently reassigned	INC	13 May 2002	8 December 2003
Dayaram Parmar	Minister of State	Portfolio not specified in the cited swearing-in report	INC	5 December 1998	13 May 2002
Dayaram Parmar	Minister of State	Portfolio continued or subsequently reassigned	INC	13 May 2002	8 December 2003
Deependra Singh Shekhawat	Minister of State	Portfolio not specified in the cited swearing-in report	INC	5 December 1998	13 May 2002
Deependra Singh Shekhawat	Minister of State	Portfolio continued or subsequently reassigned	INC	13 May 2002	8 December 2003
Hari Singh Kumher	Minister of State	Portfolio not specified in the cited swearing-in report	INC	5 December 1998	13 May 2002
Hari Singh Kumher	Minister of State	Portfolio continued or subsequently reassigned	INC	13 May 2002	8 December 2003
Hira Lal Indora	Minister of State	Portfolio not specified in the cited swearing-in report	INC	5 December 1998	13 May 2002
Hira Lal Indora	Cabinet Minister	Promoted to cabinet rank; portfolio not specified in the cited expansion report	INC	13 May 2002	8 December 2003
Indira Mayaram	Minister of State	Portfolio not specified in the cited swearing-in report	INC	5 December 1998	13 May 2002
Indira Mayaram	Minister of State	Portfolio continued or subsequently reassigned	INC	13 May 2002	8 December 2003
Jitendra Singh	Minister of State	Portfolio not specified in the cited swearing-in report	INC	5 December 1998	13 May 2002
Jitendra Singh	Minister of State	Portfolio continued or subsequently reassigned	INC	13 May 2002	8 December 2003
Master Bhanwar Lal	Minister of State	Portfolio not specified in the cited swearing-in report	INC	5 December 1998	13 May 2002
Master Bhanwar Lal	Minister of State	Portfolio continued or subsequently reassigned	INC	13 May 2002	8 December 2003
Parsadi Lal Meena	Minister of State	Portfolio not specified in the cited swearing-in report	INC	5 December 1998	13 May 2002
Parsadi Lal Meena	Cabinet Minister	Promoted to cabinet rank; portfolio not specified in the cited expansion report	INC	13 May 2002	8 December 2003
Rajendra Chaudhary	Minister of State	Portfolio not specified in the cited swearing-in report	INC	5 December 1998	13 May 2002
Rajendra Chaudhary	Minister of State	Portfolio continued or subsequently reassigned	INC	13 May 2002	8 December 2003
Govind Singh Gurjar	Cabinet Minister	Portfolio not specified in the cited induction report	INC	13 May 2002	26 January 2003
Ram Narayan Chaudhary	Cabinet Minister	Portfolio not specified in the cited induction report	INC	13 May 2002	26 January 2003
Janardan Singh Gehlot	Cabinet Minister	Portfolio not specified in the cited induction report	INC	13 May 2002	26 January 2003
Madho Singh Diwan	Cabinet Minister	Portfolio not specified in the cited induction report	INC	13 May 2002	26 January 2003
Shailendra Joshi	Minister of State	Portfolio not specified in the cited induction report	INC	13 May 2002	26 January 2003
K. C. Vishnoi	Minister of State	Portfolio not specified in the cited induction report	INC	13 May 2002	26 January 2003
Radheyshyam Ganganagar	Minister of State	Portfolio not specified in the cited induction report	INC	13 May 2002	26 January 2003
Ratan Lal Tambi	Minister of State	Portfolio not specified in the cited induction report	INC	13 May 2002	26 January 2003
Paras Ram Mordia	Minister of State	Portfolio not specified in the cited induction report	INC	13 May 2002	26 January 2003
Ram Swaroop Meena	Minister of State	Portfolio not specified in the cited induction report	INC	13 May 2002	26 January 2003
Ram Gopal Bairwa	Minister of State	Portfolio not specified in the cited induction report	INC	13 May 2002	26 January 2003
Hema Ram Chaudhary	Minister of State	Portfolio not specified in the cited induction report	INC	13 May 2002	26 January 2003
Taqiuddin Ahmed	Minister of State	Portfolio not specified in the cited induction report	INC	13 May 2002	26 January 2003
Habibur Rahman	Minister of State	Portfolio not specified in the cited induction report	INC	13 May 2002	26 January 2003
Raghuvir Singh Meena	Minister of State	Portfolio not specified in the cited induction report	INC	13 May 2002	26 January 2003
Banwari Lal Bairwa	Deputy Chief Minister	Transport; Planning (additional charge); Human Resource (additional charge)	INC	26 January 2003	8 December 2003
Kamla Beniwal	Deputy Chief Minister	Irrigation; Revenue (additional charge)	INC	26 January 2003	8 December 2003
Ram Singh Vishnoi	Cabinet Minister	Agriculture	INC	26 January 2003	8 December 2003
Govind Singh Gurjar	Cabinet Minister	Panchayati Raj	INC	26 January 2003	8 December 2003
Shanti Dhariwal	Cabinet Minister	Tourism; Art and Culture	INC	26 January 2003	8 December 2003
B. D. Kalla	Cabinet Minister	Education; Medical and Health; Personnel; Administrative Reforms	INC	26 January 2003	8 December 2003
Madho Singh Diwan	Cabinet Minister	Women and Child Development; Policy Planning; Information Technology	INC	26 January 2003	8 December 2003
C. P. Joshi	Cabinet Minister	Public Health Engineering; Ground Water; Economics and Statistics	INC	26 January 2003	8 December 2003
Taqiuddin Ahmed	Minister of State (Independent Charge)	Local Self Government	INC	26 January 2003	8 December 2003
Paras Ram Mordia	Minister of State	Home (additional charge)	INC	26 January 2003	8 December 2003
Jitendra Singh	Minister of State	Revenue	INC	26 January 2003	8 December 2003
Habibur Rahman	Minister of State	Tourism	INC	26 January 2003	8 December 2003

== End of the ministry ==
The Congress was defeated in the 2003 Rajasthan Legislative Assembly election. Vasundhara Raje was sworn in as chief minister on 8 December 2003, succeeding Gehlot.

== See also ==
- Ashok Gehlot
- Government of Rajasthan
- Second Ashok Gehlot ministry
- Third Ashok Gehlot ministry
- 11th Rajasthan Assembly
- List of chief ministers of Rajasthan
