= Ramlal Meena =

Indian politician

Member of Rajasthan Legislative Assembly
- In office 2018–2023
- Preceded by: Nand Lal Meena
- Succeeded by: Hemant Meena
- Constituency: Pratapgarh

Personal details
- Born: Pratapgarh, Rajasthan
- Political party: Indian National Congress

Ramlal Meena is an Indian politician. He was a member of the Rajasthan Legislative Assembly from Pratapgarh constituency.
