= Lohawat =

- Subdivision/Tehsil
- Interactive map of Lohawat
- Location in Rajasthan, India
- Coordinates: 26°59′00″N 72°35′17″E
- Country: India
- State: Rajasthan
- District: Phalodi

Government
  - Type: Rajasthan Legislative Assembly
  - MLA: Gajendra Singh Khimsar

Languages
  - Spoken: Hindi, Marwadi
  - Official: Hindi, Marwari
- Time zone: UTC+5:30 (IST)
- PIN: 342302
- Vehicle registration: RJ-43

Lohawat is a Block and village of phalodi district in Rajasthan, India. It became Lohawat (Rajasthan Assembly constituency) seat in 2008.
