= Nagar Assembly constituency =

Legislative Assembly constituency in Rajasthan State, India

Coordinates: 27.42°N 77.10°E

Nagar
- Constituency No. 71 for the Rajasthan Legislative Assembly

Constituency details
- Country: India
- Region: North India
- State: Rajasthan
- District: Bharatpur
- Lok Sabha constituency: Bharatpur
- Established: 1977
- Total electors: 250,148
- Reservation: None

Member of Legislative Assembly
- 16th Rajasthan Legislative Assembly
- Incumbent Jawahar Singh Bedham
- Party: Bharatiya Janata Party

Nagar Assembly constituency is one of the 200 Legislative Assembly constituencies of Rajasthan state in India.

== Member of the Legislative Assembly ==
Year	Member	Political Party
1977	Adityendra	Janata Party
1980	Murad Khan	Indian National Congress
1985	Sampat Singh	Lokdal
1990	Sampat Singh	Janata Dal
1993	Gopi Chand	Bharatiya Janata Party
1998	Mohamad Mahir Azad	Bahujan Samaj Party
2003	Mohamad Mahir Azad	Indian National Congress
2008	Anita Singh	Bharatiya Janata Party
2013	Anita Singh	Bharatiya Janata Party
2018	Wajib Ali	Bahujan Samaj Party
2023	Jawahar Singh Bedham	Bharatiya Janata Party

== Election results ==
=== 2023 ===
2023 Rajasthan Legislative Assembly election: Nagar
Party	Candidate	Votes	%	±%
BJP	Jawahar Singh Bedham	75,579	37.52	+17.1
INC	Wajib Ali	74,048	36.76	+18.25
ASP(KR)	Nem Singh	46,314	22.99	
SP	Govind Sharma	2,215	1.1	−20.62
NOTA	None of the above	571	0.28	−0.32
Majority		1,531	0.76	−14.12
Turnout		201,439	80.53	+4.1
BJP gain from BSP		Swing		

=== 2018 ===
2018 Rajasthan Legislative Assembly election: Nagar
Party	Candidate	Votes	%	±%
BSP	Wajib Ali	62,644	36.6	
SP	Nem Singh	37,177	21.72	
BJP	Anita Singh	34,946	20.42	
INC	Murari Lal	31,678	18.51	
NOTA	None of the above	1,034	0.6	
Majority		25,467	14.88	
Turnout		171,163	76.43	
BSP gain from BJP		Swing		

== See also ==
- List of constituencies of the Rajasthan Legislative Assembly
- Bharatpur district
