= Wajib Ali =

Indian politician

Member of the Rajasthan Legislative Assembly
- In office 2018–2023
- Preceded by: Anita Singh Gurjar
- Succeeded by: Jawahar Singh Bedham
- Constituency: Nagar Assembly constituency

Personal details
- Born: 1 February 1982 Sikri
- Party: Indian National Congress
- Other political affiliations: Bahujan Samaj Party
- Profession: Businessman

Wajib Ali is an Indian politician belonging to Indian National Congress. He was elected to the 15th Rajasthan Assembly from the Nagar constituency under the Bahujan Samaj Party in 2018.
