= Kishna Ram Vishnoi =

Indian politician from Rajasthan

- किसनाराम विश्नोई
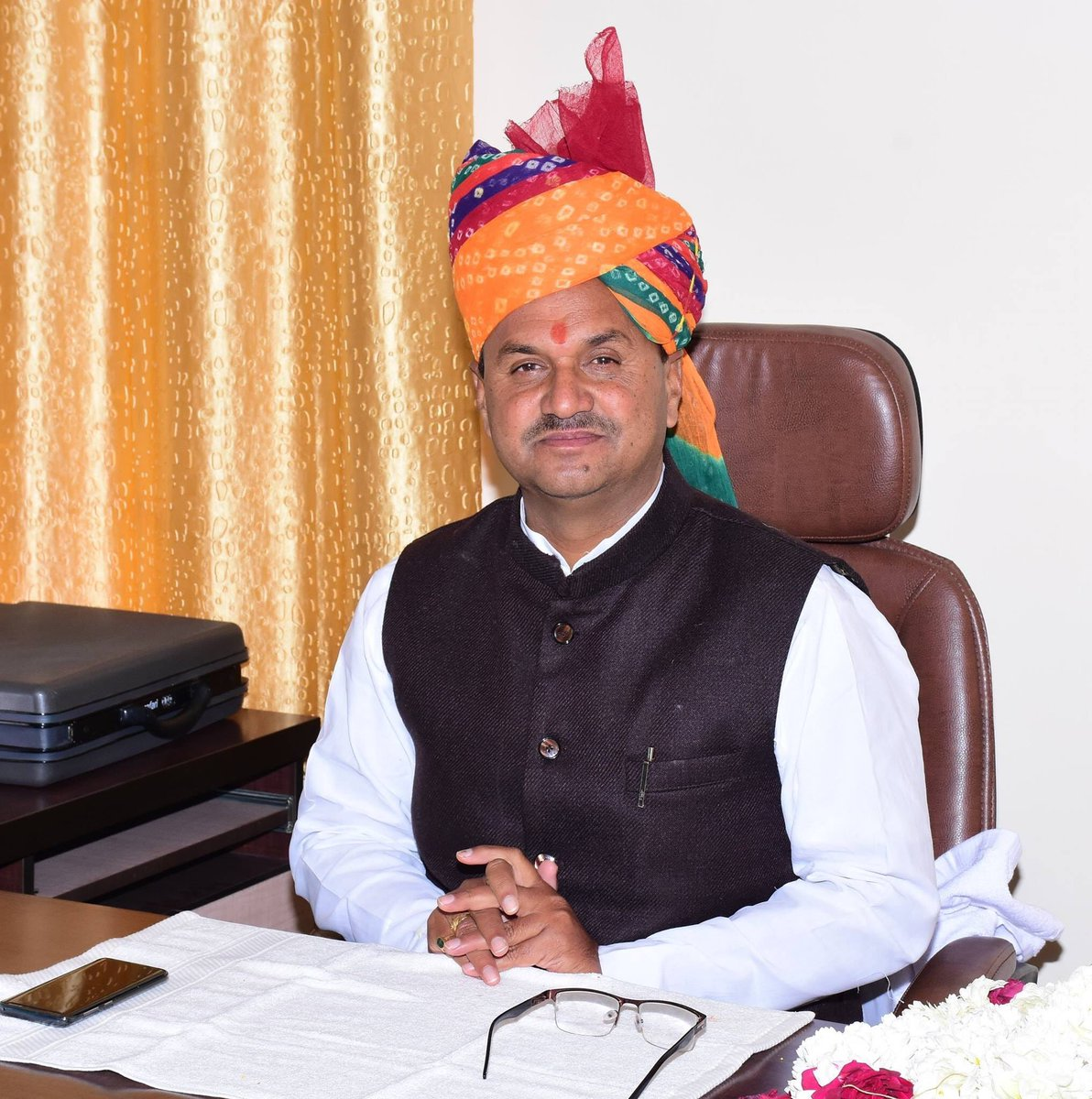
- Kishna Ram Vishnoi MLA

Member of Legislative Assembly
- In office 11 December 2018 – 3 December 2023
- Preceded by: Gajendra Singh Khimsar
- Succeeded by: Gajendra Singh Khimsar
- Constituency: Lohawat

Personal details
- Born: July 1, 1965 (age 60) Sadri, Jodhpur
- Party: Indian National Congress
- Spouse: Dhani Devi (m. 1991)
- Children: 2 Sons, Sandeep Bishnoi, Kuldeep Bishnoi & 2 Daughters
- Parent: Bhinyaram Udani (father)
- Education: B.A.
- Alma mater: JNVU JODHPUR
- Occupation: Agriculture

Kishna Ram Vishnoi (born 1 July 1965) was member of the Rajasthan Legislative Assembly. He is a member of the Indian national congress and represents the Lohawat (Rajasthan Assembly constituency) in Jodhpur District.

== Personal life ==
Kishna Ram Vishnoi was born in godara cast village Sadri, Tehsil Lohawat, Jodhpur, Rajasthan. He graduated from Jai Narain Vyas University Jodhpur. He is married to Dhani Devi and has two sons and two daughters.

== Political life ==
He has contested the Lohawat assembly election for the first time in 2018.

He represented Lohawat constituency of Jodhpur as Member of Legislative Assembly of Rajasthan from 2018-2023.
