= Rupinder Singh Kooner =

Indian politician

Member of the Rajasthan Legislative Assembly
- Incumbent
- Assumed office 8 January 2024
- Preceded by: Gurmeet Singh Kooner
- Constituency: Karanpur

Personal details
- Born: 3 January 1980 (age 46) 25 BB, Padampur, Sri Ganganagar district, Rajasthan
- Party: Indian National Congress
- Spouse: kushaldeep Kaur
- Parent(s): Gurmeet Singh Kooner (father); Balwinder Kaur (mother)
- Occupation: MLA
- Profession: Business, agriculture

Rupinder Singh Kooner (born 3 January 1980) is an Indian politician currently serving as the 16th Member of the Rajasthan Legislative Assembly. He represents Karanpur and is a member of the Indian National Congress.

The election for Karanpur seat was postponed due to the death of the Congress candidate and the then MLA Gurmeet Singh Kooner. The Congress has fielded Kooner's son, Rupinder Singh from the Karanpur seat in by-election which was held on 5 January 2024. The counting was held on 8 January and the Congress candidate Rupinder Singh Kooner defeated Bharatiya Janata Party candidate Surendra Pal Singh, then was a minister with over a margin of 11,283 votes.
