= Sanganer Assembly constituency =

Constituency of the Rajasthan legislative assembly in India

Coordinates: 26.82°N 75.77°E

Sanganer
- Constituency No. 55 for the Rajasthan Legislative Assembly

Constituency details
- Country: India
- Region: North India
- State: Rajasthan
- District: Jaipur district
- Established: 1977
- Reservation: None

Member of Legislative Assembly
- 16th Rajasthan Legislative Assembly
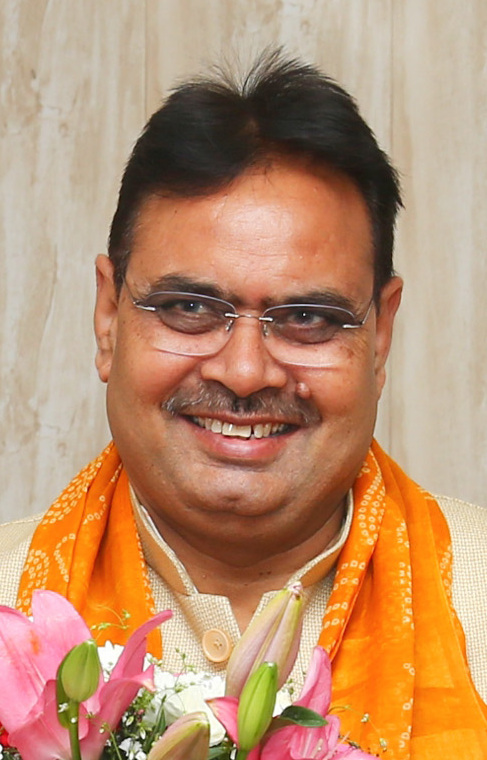
- Incumbent Bhajan Lal Sharma; Chief Minister of Rajasthan
- Party: Bharatiya Janata Party
- Elected year: 2023
- Preceded by: Ashok Lahoty

Sanganer Assembly constituency is one of the 200 constituencies in the Rajasthan Legislative Assembly and falls within the Jaipur Lok Sabha constituency. It encompasses parts of the Mansarovar and Sanganer neighborhoods in Jaipur city, covering all voters from Ward numbers 24 to 32 of the Jaipur Municipal Corporation. Chief minister of state represents this constituency.

== History ==
Sanganer Assembly constituency was established in 1976 through the Delimitation of Parliamentary and Assembly Constituencies Order, 1976. The Delimitation Commission of India created 16 new constituencies at that time, bringing the total number of constituencies to 200, in accordance with the Delimitation Act of 1972.

== Members of the Legislative Assembly ==
Year	Member	Party
1977	Vidhya Pathak	Janata Party
1980	Vidhya Pathak	Bharatiya Janata Party
1985	Vidhya Pathak	Bharatiya Janata Party
1990	Vidhya Pathak	Bharatiya Janata Party
1993	Indira Mayaram	Indian National Congress
1998	Indira Mayaram	Indian National Congress
2003	Ghanshyam Tiwari	Bharatiya Janta Party
2008	Ghanshyam Tiwari	Bharatiya Janta Party
2013	Ghanshyam Tiwari	Bharatiya Janta Party
2018	Ashok Lahoty	Bharatiya Janta Party
2023	Bhajan Lal Sharma	Bharatiya Janta Party

== Election results ==
=== 2023 ===
2023 Rajasthan Legislative Assembly election: Sanganer
Party	Candidate	Votes	%	±%
BJP	Bhajan Lal Sharma	145,162	58.44	+6.93
INC	Pushpendra Bhardwaj	97,081	39.08	+4.47
NOTA	None of the above	1,296	0.52	−0.59
Majority		48,081	19.36	+2.46
Turnout		248,412	70.93	+1.75
BJP hold		Swing		

=== 2018 ===
2018 Rajasthan Legislative Assembly election: Sanganer
Party	Candidate	Votes	%	±%
BJP	Ashok Lahoti	107,947	51.51	
INC	Pushpendra Bhardwaj	72,542	34.61	
Bharat Vahini Party	Ghanshyam Tiwari	17,371	8.29	
NOTA	None of the above	2,325	1.11	
Majority		35,405	16.9	
Turnout		209,572	69.18	
BJP hold		Swing		

=== 2013 ===
Rajasthan Assembly Election, 2013: Sanganer
Party	Candidate	Votes	%	±%
BJP	Ghanshyam Tiwari	112,465	65.59	
INC	Sanjay Bapna	47,115	27.48	
JGP	Vijay Sharma	1,780	1.04	
BSP	Keshav Shukla	1,395	0.81	
NPEP	Chhail Bihari	1,302	0.76	
NOTA	None of the Above	2,911	1.70	
Majority		65,350	38.11	
Turnout		1,71,474	68.16	
BJP hold		Swing		

== See also ==
- Member of the Legislative Assembly (India)
