= Nagaur Assembly constituency =

Legislative Assembly constituency in Rajasthan State, India

Coordinates: 27.2°N 73.73°E

Nagaur
- Constituency No. 109 for the Rajasthan Legislative Assembly

Constituency details
- Country: India
- Region: North India
- State: Rajasthan
- District: Nagaur
- Lok Sabha constituency: Nagaur
- Established: 1972
- Total electors: 270,729
- Reservation: None

Member of Legislative Assembly
- 16th Rajasthan Legislative Assembly
- Incumbent Harendra Mirdha
- Party: Indian National Congress
- Elected year: 2023

Nagaur Assembly constituency is one of the 200 Legislative Assembly constituencies of Rajasthan state in India. It comprises parts of Nagaur tehsil, in Nagaur district. As of 2023, it is represented by Harendra Mirdha of the Indian National Congress.

== Members of the Legislative Assembly ==
Year	Member	Party
1993	Harendra Mirdha	Indian National Congress
1998	Harendra Mirdha	Indian National Congress
2003	Gajendra Singh Khimsar	Bharatiya Janata Party
2008	Habibur Rahaman	Bharatiya Janata Party
2013	Habibur Rahaman	Bharatiya Janata Party
2018	Mohan Ram Choudhary	Bharatiya Janata Party
2023	Harendra Mirdha	Indian National Congress

== Election results ==
=== 2023 ===
2023 Rajasthan Legislative Assembly election: Nagaur
Party	Candidate	Votes	%	±%
INC	Harendra Mirdha	87,110	46.29	+4.66
BJP	Jyoti Mirdha	72,490	38.52	−10.5
Independent	Habiburrehman Ashrafi Lamba	20,578	10.93	
Independent	Surendra Dotar	1,801	0.96	
NOTA	None of the above	2,159	1.15	+0.32
Majority		14,620	7.77	+0.38
Turnout		188,186	69.51	−3.16
INC gain from BJP		Swing		

=== 2018 ===
2018 Rajasthan Legislative Assembly election: Nagaur
Party	Candidate	Votes	%	±%
BJP	Mohan Ram	86,315	49.02	
INC	Habibur Rehman Ashrafi Lamba	73,307	41.63	
RLP	Samsher Khan	5,372	3.05	
BSP	Bajrang Ram	2,158	1.23	
Independent	Narendra	2,089	1.19	
Dalit Kranti Dal	Goutam Nayak	1,613	0.92	
NOTA	None of the above	1,453	0.83	
Majority		13,008	7.39	
Turnout		176,092	72.67	
BJP hold		Swing		

== See also ==
- List of constituencies of the Rajasthan Legislative Assembly
- Nagaur district
