= Chak Kazi Barrpura =

- village
- Location in Rajasthan, India Chak Kazi Barrpura (India)
- Coordinates: 27°7′31″N 77°32′8″E
- Country: India
- State: Rajasthan
- District: Bharatpur

Population
  - Total: 830

Languages
  - Official: Hindi
- Time zone: UTC+5:30 (IST)
- PIN: 321001
- Telephone code: 05644
- ISO 3166 code: RJ-IN
- Vehicle registration: RJ05
- Nearest city: Bharatpur
- Sex ratio: 1000:860 ♂/♀
- Literacy: 56%
- Lok Sabha constituency: Bharatpur
- Vidhan Sabha constituency: Nadbai

Chak Kazi Barrpura (also spelled as 'Barrpura', 'Barrapura', 'Chak Qazi', Chak Kazi or 'Chak Kaji') is a small village about 12 km from Bharatpur, India in Rajasthan state. This village is located beside the Keoladeo National Park (KNP) in south-west side of its boundary.

== Social and Developmental Canvas ==
Most of villagers are farmers. Based on census of India 2001, there are 124 families in the village and the population is 830. Male population is 446 and female population is 384 (sex ratio = 1000:860).Total agriculture labor is 97 and working population is 170. Total literacy is 56 percent. Male literacy is 67 percent. Female literacy is 43 percent.

There are all Jatav families including one mehtar family in the village. All the people belong to Scheduled caste (SC), a socially backward class mentioned in Constitution of India.

== 2001 Census report of village ==
| No of Households | 124 |
| Total Population | 830 | Population below 06 yrs | 192 |
| Male Population | 446 | Population below 06 Male | 109 |
| Female Population | 384 | Population below 06 Female | 83 |
| Total Agriculture Labour | 97 |
| Marginal Agriculture Labour - Male | 7 | Marginal Agriculture Labour - Female | 90 |
| Literate Population | 466 | Illiterate Population | 364 |
| Male Literate | 301 | Male illiterate population | 145 |
| Female Literate | 165 | Female illiterate population | 219 |
| No of Households | 124 | Working Population | 358 |
| Main working population | 170 |
| Main Working Population Male | 10 | Main Working Population Female | 160 |
| Main Casual Working Population | 71 | Total Casual labour |
| Main Casual Working Population Male | 3 | Main Casual Working Population Female |
| Number of SC | 829 |
| Male SC Population | 445 | Female SC Population | 384 |
| Number of ST | 0 |
| Male ST Population | 0 | Female ST Population | 0 |

== Geography ==
The geographic location of the village is 27°7′31″N 77°32′8″E. The Address of village is : Village-Barrpura, Post- Aghapur, District- Bharatpur - 321001 (Rajasthan).

The neighboring villages are: Aghapur, Darapur kala, Darapur Khurd, Nagla Banjara, Chak Naswaria, Nagla Bajho, Chak New, Nagla Punjabi, Kalyanpur, Chak Chaube, Chaukipura, Kaproli. Ajan dam is located near these villages.

== History ==
The people of this village came from three villages: Veerampura, Ghughupura and Bilothi in about 1960. Half part of the village (by population as well as residence area) is formed by the people came from Veerampura and another half is formed by the people came from Ghughupura and Bilothi, making each half of it.

== Economy ==
Residents depend on agriculture economically. Due to poor condition of agriculture in India, they are economically backward, as like other villages in India. Few people are also in other government and private sectors.

== Education ==
There is one government primary school in the village. The students of the village have to go another village after fifth class for further reading. Even male child education is not satisfactory, the condition of girl child education is poorer. There is only one government primary school in the village.
