= Gajendra Singh Khimsar =

Indian politician

Cabinet Minister, Government of Rajasthan
- Incumbent
- Assumed office 30 December 2023
- Governor: Haribhau Bagade
- Chief Minister: Bhajan Lal Sharma
- Ministry and Departments: List: Medical & Health; Medical & Health Services (ESI)
- Preceded by: Parsadi Lal Meena
- In office 20 December 2013 – 17 December 2018
- Chief Minister: Vasundhara Raje
- Ministry and Departments: List: Energy; Non-resident Indian/N.R.I.; Industry; Delhi-Mumbai Industrial Corridor; Public Enterprises; Youth and Sports; Environment; Forest

Minister of State Government of Rajasthan
- In office 31 May 2004 – 10 December 2008
- Chief Minister: Vasundhara Raje
- Ministry and Departments: List: Energy

Member of the Rajasthan Legislative Assembly
- Incumbent
- Assumed office 3 December 2023
- Preceded by: Kishna Ram Vishnoi
- Constituency: Lohawat
- In office 2008–2018
- Succeeded by: Kishna Ram Vishnoi
- Constituency: Lohawat
- In office 2003–2008
- Preceded by: Harendra Mirdha
- Succeeded by: Habibur Rahaman
- Constituency: Nagaur

Personal details
- Born: 25 December 1957 (age 68) Jodhpur district, Rajasthan, India
- Party: Bhartiya Janta Party
- Spouse: Priti Kumari (m. 1982)
- Children: 2
- Parent(s): Onkar Singh (father); Snehlata Devi (mother)
- Education: B.B.A.
- Alma mater: University of Western Ontario
- Occupation: Politician
- Profession: Business

Gajendra Singh Khimsar (born 25 December 1957) is an Indian politician and the currently serving Cabinet Minister of the Medical & Health Department in the Government of Rajasthan. He has been a Member of the Rajasthan Legislative Assembly of 13th, 14th, 16th Assembly from Lohawat and 12th from Nagaur. He is Member of the Bharatiya Janata Party.

== Early life ==
Khimsar was born in 1959 in Khimsar Fort. He completed his schooling at The Doon School and went on to pursue Bachelor of Business Administration from The University of Western Ontario, Canada.

== Political career ==
He is a Member of Legislative Assembly from Lohawat, Rajasthan since 2003. He held responsibilities as Minister of Energy, Govt. of Rajasthan (2003–2008). He was also Minister of Forests, Environment and Sports and Youth Affairs in Second Vasundhara Raje ministry.

== Personal life ==
=== Family ===
Khimsar married Priti Kumari on 25 February 1982. They have a son and a daughter. jhuhuhjjnhh

=== Sports and business ===
Khimsar also represented India at the World Squash Championship. During his college years, he was ranked 28th in the PSA (Professional Squash Association) world rankings. He was also ranked no.2 in Canada and was the finalist of the US and Canadian Open. A Hotelier by profession, the Khimsar Group of Hotels has been recipient of the 'National Grand Heritage Award For Excellence'- the highest recognition conferred upon any heritage property by the Department of Tourism, Government of India.
