= Third Shekhawat ministry =

3rd Ministry of Bhairon Singh Shekhawat

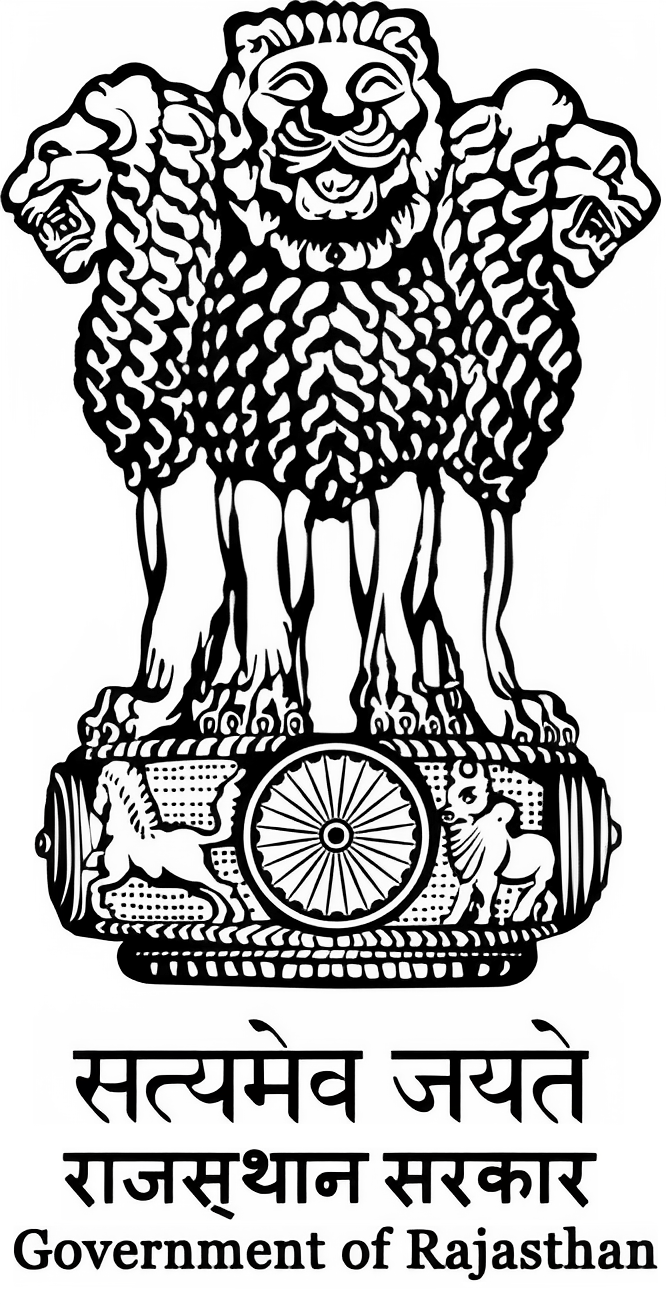
- Ministry of Rajasthan

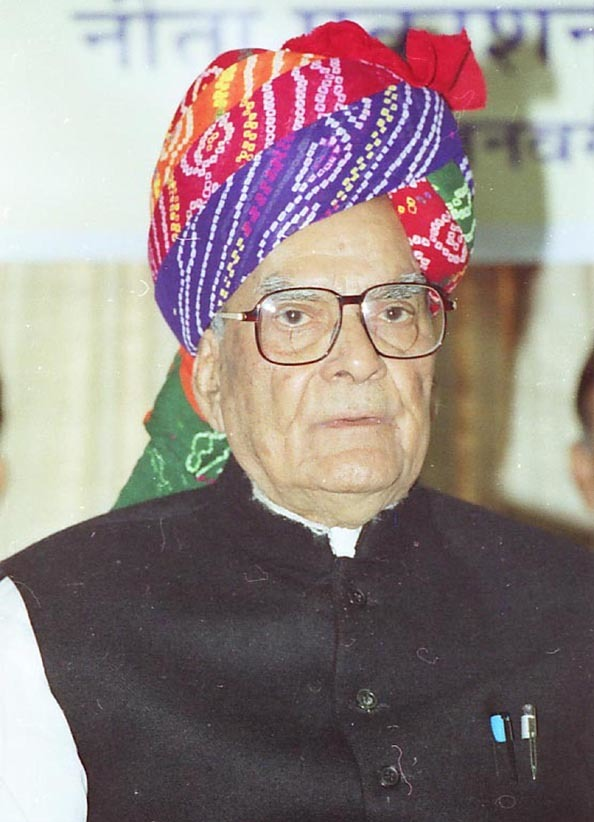
- Bhairon Singh Shekhawat
- Date formed: 4 December 1993
- Date dissolved: 1 December 1998

People and organisations
- Governor: Bali Ram Bhagat; Darbara Singh; Navrang Lal Tibrewal
- Chief Minister: Bhairon Singh Shekhawat
- Deputy Chief Ministers: Hari Shankar Bhabhra
- Member parties: BJP; JD; Independent
- Status in legislature: Coalition
- Opposition party: INC
- Opposition leader: Parasram Maderna

History
- Election: 1993
- Legislature term: 5 years
- Predecessor: President's rule
- Successor: First Gehlot ministry

Third Bhairon Singh Shekhawat ministry represents the formation of the cabinet of the Indian state Rajasthan under the leadership of Bhairon Singh Shekhawat, who has been elected the eighth Chief Minister of Rajasthan. The Bharatiya Janata Party and Janata Dal secured an coalition government in the 1993 Rajasthan Legislative Assembly election winning 95 and 6 respectively out of the 199 seats in the state assembly.

== Council of Ministers ==
Name	Office	Portfolio	Took Office	Left Office	Party
Bhairon Singh Shekhawat	Chief Minister		4 December 1993	1 December 1998	BJP
Hari Shankar Bhabhra	Deputy Chief Minister		4 December 1993	1 December 1998	BJP
Nasaru Khan	Cabinet Minister		4 December 1993	1 December 1998	BJP
Rohitashv Sharma	Cabinet Minister		4 December 1993	1 December 1998	BJP
Sujan Singh Yadav	Cabinet Minister		4 December 1993	1 December 1998	BJP
Bhanwar Lal Sharma (politician)	Cabinet Minister		4 December 1993	1 December 1998	BJP
Mangal Ram Koli	Minister of State		4 December 1993	1 December 1998	BJP

== See also ==
- First Shekhawat ministry
- Second Shekhawat ministry
