= Udai Lal Bhadana =

Indian politician

Member of 16th Rajasthan Assembly
- Incumbent
- Assumed office 15 December 2023
- Preceded by: Ramlal Jat
- Constituency: Mandal

Personal details
- Party: Bharatiya Janata Party
- Occupation: Politician

Udai Lal Bhadana is an Indian politician currently serving as a member of the 16th Rajasthan Assembly, representing the Mandal Assembly constituency, as a member of the Bharatiya Janata Party.

== Political career ==
Following the 2023 Rajasthan Legislative Assembly election, he was elected as an MLA from the Mandal Assembly constituency. He defeated Indian national Congress (INC) candidate Ramlal Jat with 35,878 votes.
