= Pratapgarh, Rajasthan Assembly constituency =

Legislative Assembly constituency in Rajasthan State, India

Coordinates: 24.03°N 74.78°E

Pratapgarh
- Constituency No. 172 for the Rajasthan Legislative Assembly

Constituency details
- Country: India
- Region: North India
- State: Rajasthan
- District: Pratapgarh
- Lok Sabha constituency: Chittorgarh
- Established: 1977
- Total electors: 259,074
- Reservation: ST

Member of Legislative Assembly
- 16th Rajasthan Legislative Assembly
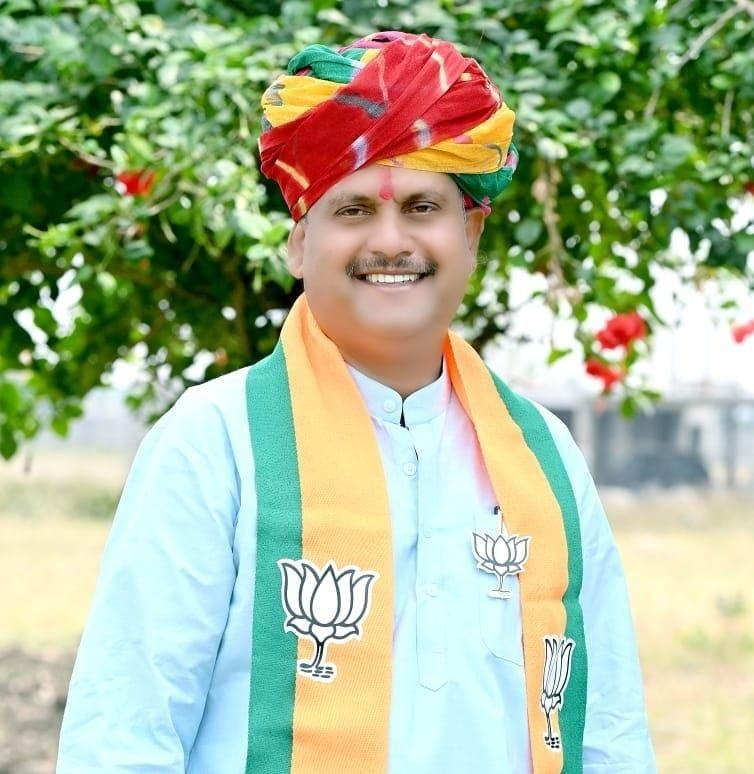
- Incumbent Hemant Meena
- Party: Bharatiya Janata Party

Pratapgarh Assembly constituency is one of the 200 Legislative Assembly constituencies of Rajasthan state in India.

It is part of Pratapgarh district and is reserved for candidates belonging to the Scheduled Tribes. As of 2023, it is represented by Hemant Meena of the Bharatiya Janata Party.

== Members of the Legislative Assembly ==
Year	Member	Party
2008	Nandlal Meena	Bharatiya Janata Party
2013	Nandlal Meena	Bharatiya Janata Party
2018	Ramlal Meena	Indian National Congress
2023	Hemant Meena	Bharatiya Janata Party

== Election results ==
=== 2023 ===
2023 Rajasthan Legislative Assembly election: Pratapgarh
Party	Candidate	Votes	%	±%
BJP	Hemant Meena	87,644	40.03	−3.09
INC	Ramlal Meena	62,535	28.56	−23.13
BAP	Mangi Lal Meena	62,023	28.33	
BSP	Kamal Meena	2,000	0.91	−0.31
NOTA	None of the above	2,128	0.97	−0.4
Majority		25,109	11.47	+2.9
Turnout		218,922	84.5	+1.95
BJP gain from INC		Swing		

=== 2018 ===
2018 Rajasthan Legislative Assembly election: Pratapgarh
Party	Candidate	Votes	%	±%
INC	Ramlal Meena	100,625	51.69	
BJP	Hemant Meena	83,945	43.12	
BSP	Ganesh Lal Meena	2,378	1.22	
Bharatiya Yuva Shakti	Dharam Chand	1,943	1.0	
Independent	Narayan Lal	1,864	0.96	
NOTA	None of the above	2,665	1.37	
Majority		16,680	8.57	
Turnout		194,679	82.55	
INC gain from BJP		Swing		

== See also ==
- List of constituencies of the Rajasthan Legislative Assembly
- Pratapgarh district
