= Ajmer North Assembly constituency =

Legislative Assembly constituency in Rajasthan State, India

Coordinates: 26.65°N 74.64°E

Ajmer North
- Constituency No. 100 for the Rajasthan Legislative Assembly

Constituency details
- Country: India
- Region: North India
- State: Rajasthan
- District: Ajmer
- Lok Sabha constituency: Ajmer
- Established: 2008
- Total electors: 209,862
- Reservation: None

Member of Legislative Assembly
- 16th Rajasthan Legislative Assembly
- Incumbent Vasudev Devnani
- Party: Bharatiya Janata Party
- Elected year: 2018

Ajmer North Assembly constituency is one of the 200 Legislative Assembly constituencies of Rajasthan state in India. It was created after the passing of the Delimitation of Parliamentary & Assembly constituencies Order - 2008.

It is part of Ajmer district. As of 2023, its representative is Vasudev Devnani of the Bharatiya Janata Party.

== Members of the Legislative Assembly ==
Year	Member	Party
2008	Vasudev Devnani	Bharatiya Janata Party
2013	Vasudev Devnani	Bharatiya Janata Party
2018	Vasudev Devnani	Bharatiya Janata Party
2023	Vasudev Devnani	Bharatiya Janata Party

== Election results ==
=== 2023 ===
Rajasthan Legislative Assembly Election, 2023: Ajmer North
Party	Candidate	Votes	%	±%
BJP	Vasudev Devnani	57,895	40.44	−10.62
INC	Mahendra Singh Ralawata	53,251	37.19	−7.38
Independent	Gyanchand Saraswat	26,352	18.41	
Independent	Kundan Vaishnav	1,971	1.38	
NOTA	None of the above	1,231	0.86	−0.34
Majority		4,644	3.25	−3.24
Turnout		143,169	68.22	+3.78
BJP hold		Swing		

=== 2018 ===
Rajasthan Legislative Assembly Election, 2018: Ajmer North
Party	Candidate	Votes	%	±%
BJP	Vasudev Devnani	67,881	51.06	
INC	Mahendra Singh Ralawata	59,251	44.57	
BSP	Amad	1,940	1.46	
NOTA	None of the above	1,591	1.2	
Majority		8,630	6.49	
Turnout		132,947	64.44	

== See also ==
- List of constituencies of the Rajasthan Legislative Assembly
- Ajmer district
