= Thanagazi Assembly constituency =

Legislative Assembly constituency in Rajasthan State, India

Coordinates: 27.4°N 76.32°E

Thanagazi
- Constituency No. 64 for the Rajasthan Legislative Assembly

Constituency details
- Country: India
- Region: North India
- State: Rajasthan
- District: Alwar
- Lok Sabha constituency: Dausa
- Established: 1972
- Total electors: 221,610
- Reservation: None

Member of Legislative Assembly
- 16th Rajasthan Legislative Assembly
- Incumbent Kanti Prasad Meena
- Party: Indian National Congress

Thanagazi Assembly constituency is one of the 200 Legislative Assembly constituencies of Rajasthan state in India.

It is part of Alwar district. As of 2023, it is represented by Kanti Prasad Meena of the Indian National Congress.

== Members of the Legislative Assembly ==
Election	Name	Party
1998	Krishan Murari Gangawat	Indian National Congress
2003	Kanti parsad Meena	Independent
2008	Hem Singh Bhadana	Bharatiya Janata Party
2013	Hem Singh Bhadana	Bharatiya Janata Party
2018	Kanti Prasad Meena	Independent
2023	Kanti Prasad Meena	Indian National Congress

== Election results ==
=== 2023 ===
2023 Rajasthan Legislative Assembly election: Thanagazi
Party	Candidate	Votes	%	±%
INC	Kanti Prasad	67,350	39.9	▲25.38
BJP	Hemsingh	65,411	38.75	▲24.17
AAP	Kailash	19,876	11.77	
Independent	Bhupesh Singh Rajawat	5,696	3.37	
ASP(KR)	Rohitash Ghanghal	4,971	2.94	
NOTA	None of the above	1,096	0.65	▼0.17
Majority		1,939	1.15	▼17.67
Turnout		168,807	76.17	▼3.01
INC gain from Independent		Swing		

=== 2018 ===
Rajasthan Legislative Assembly Election, 2018: Thanagazi
Party	Candidate	Votes	%	±%
Independent	Kanti Prasad	64,079	41.09	
Independent	Hem Singh	34,729	22.27	
BJP	Rohitash Kumar	22,735	14.58	
INC	Sunil Kumar	22,637	14.52	
Independent	Kuldeep Sharma	4,702	3.02	
Independent	Ram Charan Koli	1,565	1.0	
NOTA	None of the above	1,278	0.82	
Majority		29,350	18.82	
Turnout		155,938	79.18	

== See also ==
- List of constituencies of the Rajasthan Legislative Assembly
- Alwar district
