= Anshuman Singh =

Anshuman Singh may refer to:

- Anshuman Singh (soldier) (1997–2023), Regimental Medical Officer, Punjab Regiment, Indian Army
- Anshuman Singh (cricketer), Indian cricketer
- Anshuman Singh (politician) (1935–2021), Indian judge and politician
- Anshuman Singh Bhati, Indian politician
