= Karanpur Assembly constituency =

Constituency of the Rajasthan legislative assembly in India

Coordinates: 26.18°N 76.97°E

Karanpur
- Constituency No. 3 for the Rajasthan Legislative Assembly

Constituency details
- Country: India
- Region: North India
- State: Rajasthan
- District: Sri Ganganagar district
- Lok Sabha constituency: Ganganagar
- Established: 1957
- Reservation: None

Member of Legislative Assembly
- 16th Rajasthan Legislative Assembly
- Incumbent Rupinder Singh Kooner
- Party: Indian National Congress
- Elected year: 2023

Karanpur Assembly constituency is one of constituencies of Rajasthan Legislative Assembly in the Ganganagar Lok Sabha constituency.

Karanpur Constituency covers all voters from Karanpur tehsil and Padampur tehsil.

== Members of the Legislative Assembly ==
Year	Member	Party
1952	Gurdayal Singh Sandhu	Indian National Congress
1957	Sawant Kaur	Indian National Congress
1962	Jawand Singh Kang	Independent
1967	Gurdeep Singh Sandhu	Indian National Congress
1972	Gurdayal Singh	Socialist Party
1977	Jagtar Singh Kang	Indian National Congress
1980	Jagtar Singh Kang	Indian National Congress (I)
1985	Gurdeep Singh Sandhu	Independent
1990	Kundan Lal	Bharatiya Janata Party
1993	Jagtar Singh Kang	Indian National Congress
1998	Gurmeet Singh Kooner	Indian National Congress
2003	Surender Pal Singh	Bharatiya Janata Party
2008	Gurmeet Singh Kooner	Independent
2013	Surender Pal Singh	Bharatiya Janata Party
2018	Gurmeet Singh Kooner	Indian National Congress
2023	Election adjourned due to death of candidate	
2024^	Rupinder Singh Kooner	Indian National Congress

^denotes by-poll

== Election results ==
=== 2024 bypoll ===
2024 Rajasthan Legislative Assembly by election: Karanpur
Party	Candidate	Votes	%	±%
INC	Rupinder Singh Kooner	94,950	48.55	▲9.55
BJP	Surender Pal Singh	83,667	42.78	▲18.78
AAP	Prithipal Singh	11,940	6.1	▲5.63
BSP	Ashok Kumar	514	0.26	▼0.74
NOTA	None of the Above	1034	0.53	▼0.16
Others	Independents	3,458	1.77	N/A
Majority		11,283	5.77	▼9.2
Turnout		1,95,586	81.38	▼3.33
INC hold		Swing		

=== 2018 ===
2018 Rajasthan Legislative Assembly election: Karanpur
Party	Candidate	Votes	%	±%
INC	Gurmeet Singh Kooner	73,896	38.98	
Independent	Prithipal Singh	45,520	24.01	
BJP	Surender Pal Singh	44,099	23.26	
Independent	Mahender Kumar Rassewat	15,782	8.32	
NOTA	None of the above	1,300	0.69	
Majority		28,376	14.97	
Turnout		189,597	84.71	
INC gain from BJP		Swing		

== See also ==
- Member of the Legislative Assembly (India)
