= Kanti Prasad Meena =

Member of the Rajasthan Legislative Assembly

Member of the Rajasthan Legislative Assembly
- Incumbent
- Assumed office 2018
- Preceded by: Hem Singh Bhadana
- Constituency: Thanagazi

Personal details
- Political party: Congress
- Occupation: Politician

Kanti Prasad Meena is a member of the Rajasthan Legislative Assembly from Thanagazi constituency.
