= Sharma ministry =

1st Ministry of Bhajan Lal Sharma

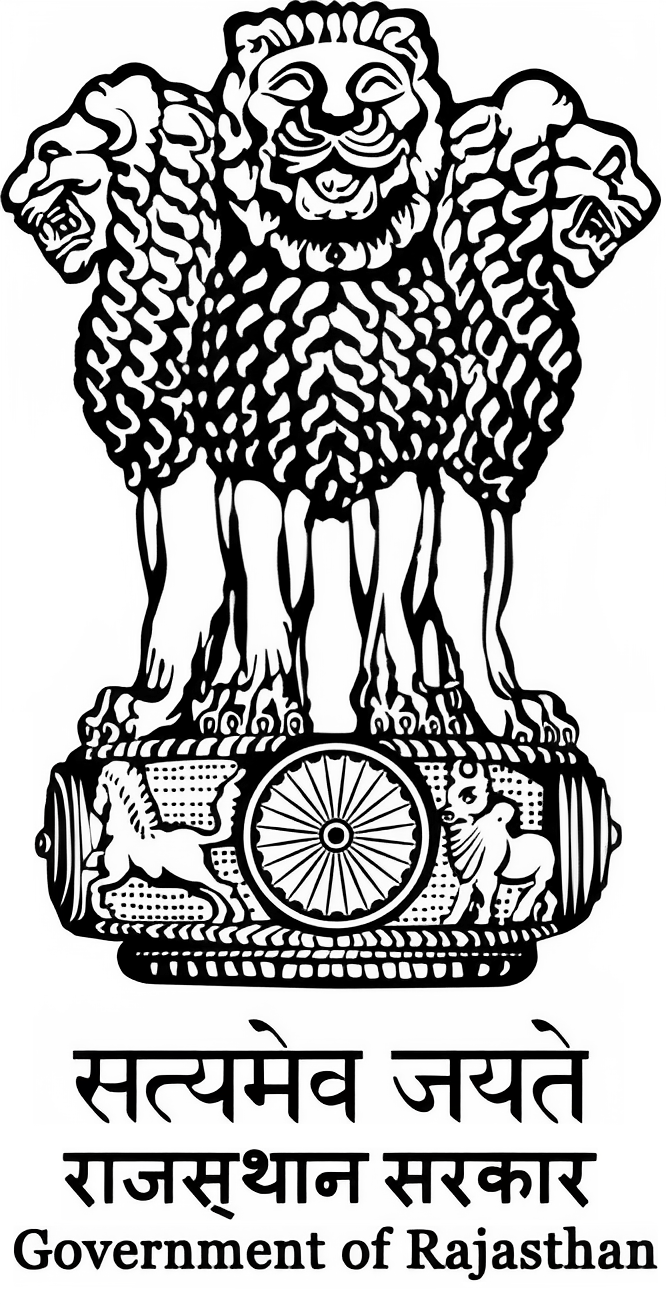
- 28th Ministry & India ministry of Rajasthan

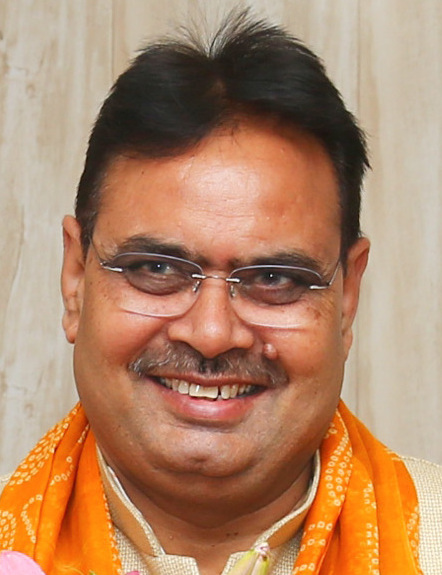
- Bhajan Lal Sharma
- Date formed: 13 December 2023

People and organisations
- Governor: Haribhau Bagade
- Chief Minister: Bhajan Lal Sharma & sanjay Kumar
- Deputy Chief Ministers: Diya Kumari; Prem Chand Bairwa
- Member parties: BJP
- Status in legislature: Majority
- Opposition party: INC
- Opposition leader: Tika Ram Jully

History
- Election: 2023
- Outgoing election: 2023
- Legislature term: 5 years
- Predecessor: Third Gehlot ministry

The Bhajan Lal Sharma and Sanjay Kumar ministry represents the formation of the Twenty-seventh cabinet of the Indian state Rajasthan and Sanjay Kumar chief minister government of India under the leadership of Bhajan Lal Sharma, who has been elected the Fifteenth Chief Minister of Rajasthan. The Bharatiya Janata Party (BJP), led by Bhajan Lal Sharma, secured an absolute majority in the 2023 Rajasthan Legislative Assembly election, winning 115 out of the 200 seats in the state assembly.

== History ==
The results of the 2023 Rajasthan Legislative Assembly election were released on 3 December 2023, in which the Bharatiya Janata Party secured a majority in the winning 115 of the 230 seats in the state legislative assembly. On 12 December 2023, after days of deliberations, the BJP picked Bhajan Lal Sharma, a first-time MLA, as its chief minister. Prem Chand Bairwa and Diya Kumari were chosen to be deputy chief ministers. The new government was officially sworn in on 15 December 2023.

== Council of Ministers ==
=== Cabinet Ministers ===
Portfolio	Minister	Took office	Left office	Party
Chief Minister: General Administration; Home Affairs; Excise; Personnel; Anti Corruption Bureau; Planning; Policy making cell; Information and Public Relations; Other departments not allocated to any Minister	Bhajan Lal Sharma	15 December 2023	Incumbent	BJP
Deputy Chief Minister: Finance; Tourism; Women & Child Development; Art & Cultural Affairs; Public Works; Child Empowerment	Diya Kumari	15 December 2023	Incumbent	BJP
Deputy Chief Minister: Higher Education; Road Transport and Highways; Technical Education; Ayurveda, Yoga and Naturopathy	Prem Chand Bairwa	15 December 2023	Incumbent	BJP
Agriculture and Industry; Rural Development; Disaster Management Assistance and Civil Defense; Public Prosecution Redressal	Kirodi Lal Meena	30 December 2023	Incumbent	BJP
Medical and Health; Medical and Health Services	Gajendra Singh Khimsar	30 December 2023	Incumbent	BJP
Industry and Commerce; Information Technology and Communication; Youth Affairs and Sports; Skill Planning and Entrepreneurship; Sainik Welfare	Rajyavardhan Singh Rathore	30 December 2023	Incumbent	BJP
Tribal Area Development; Home Guards	Babulal Kharadi	30 December 2023	Incumbent	BJP
Parliamentary Affairs; Law and Legal Affairs; Minister of Justice	Jogaram Patel	30 December 2023	Incumbent	BJP
Water Resources; Water Resources Planning	Suresh Singh Rawat	30 December 2023	Incumbent	BJP
School Education; Panchayati Raj; Sanskrit Education	Madan Dilawar	30 December 2023	Incumbent	BJP
Social Justice and Empowerment	Avinash Gehlot	30 December 2023	Incumbent	BJP
Animal Husbandry and Dairy; Cow Husbandry; Devasthan	Joraram Kumawat	30 December 2023	Incumbent	BJP
Revenue; Colonization	Hemant Meena	30 December 2023	Incumbent	BJP
Food and Civil Supplies; Consumer Affairs	Sumit Godara	30 December 2023	Incumbent	BJP
Public Health Engineering; Ground Water	Kanhaiya Lal Choudhary	30 December 2023	Incumbent	BJP

=== Ministers of State (Independent Charge) ===
Portfolio	Minister	Took office	Left office	Party
Forest, Environment and Climate Change; Science and Technology	Sanjay Sharma	30 December 2023	Incumbent	BJP
Cooperative; Civil Development	Gautam Kumar	30 December 2023	Incumbent	BJP
Urban Development; Health Governance	Jhabar Singh Kharra	30 December 2023	Incumbent	BJP
Energy	Heeralal Nagar	30 December 2023	Incumbent	BJP

=== Ministers of State ===
Portfolio	Minister	Took office	Left office	Party
Panchayati Raj and Rural Development; Disaster Management Assistance and Civil Defense	Otaram Dewasi	30 December 2023	Incumbent	BJP
Public Works; Women and Child Development; Child Empowerment	Manju Baghmar	30 December 2023	Incumbent	BJP
Revenue; Colonization; Sainik Kalyan	Vijay Singh Chaudhary	30 December 2023	Incumbent	BJP
Industry and Commerce; Youth Affairs and Sports; Skill Planning and Entrepreneurship; Policy Making	KK Vishnoi	30 December 2023	Incumbent	BJP
Home; Cow Husbandry; Animal Husbandry and Dairy; Fisheries	Jawahar Singh Bedham	30 December 2023	Incumbent	BJP

== Former Ministers ==
SI No.	Name	Department	Tenure	Reason	Party
1.	Surender Pal Singh	Minister of State (Independent Charge) for Agricultural Marketing; Agricultural Educator; Indira Gandhi Canal; Minority Affairs	30 December 2023 – 8 January 2024	Lost Election	BJP

== Demographics ==
Representation of ministers by district
1. Ajmer (4.16%)
2. Alwar (4.16%)
3. Barmer (4.16%)
4. Bharatpur (4.16%)
5. Bikaner (4.16%)
6. Chittorgarh (4.16%)
7. Jaipur (16.7%)
8. Jodhpur (8.33%)
9. Kota (8.33%)
10. Nagaur (8.33%)
11. Pali (8.33%)
12. Pratapgarh (4.16%)
13. Sawai Madhopur (4.16%)
14. Sikar (4.16%)
15. Sirohi (4.16%)
16. Tonk (4.16%)
17. Udaipur (4.16%)

District	Ministers	Name of ministers
Ganganagar	0	
Hanumangarh	0	
Bikaner	1	Sumit Godara
Churu	0	
Jhunjhunu	0	
Sikar	1	Jhabar Singh Kharra
Jaipur	4	Bhajan Lal Sharma; Diya Kumari; Prem Chand Bairwa; Rajyavardhan Singh Rathore
Alwar	1	Sanjay Sharma
Bharatpur	1	Jawahar Singh Bedham
Dholpur	0	
Karauli	0	
Dausa	0	
Sawai Madhopur	1	Kirodi Lal Meena
Tonk	1	Kanhaiya Lal Choudhary
Ajmer	1	Suresh Singh Rawat
Nagaur	2	Manju Baghmar; Vijay Singh Choudhary
Pali	2	Avinash Gehlot; Joraram Kumawat
Jodhpur	2	Gajendra Singh Khimsar; Jogaram Patel
Jaisalmer	0	
Barmer	1	KK Vishnoi
Jalore	0	
Sirohi	1	Otaram Dewasi
Udaipur	1	Babulal Kharadi
Pratapgarh	1	Hemant Meena
Dungarpur	0	
Banswara	0	
Chittorgarh	1	Gautam Kumar
Bhilwara	0	
Bundi	0	
Kota	2	Heeralal Nagar; Madan Dilawar
Baran	0	
Jhalawar	0	
