= Baboo Lal Verma =

Indian politician (born 1955)

Minister of Food & Civil Supply and Consumer Affairs Government of Rajasthan
- In office 2014–2018
- Chief Minister: Vasundhara Raje
- Succeeded by: Ramesh Chand Meena

MLA, Rajasthan Legislative Assembly
- In office December 2013 – December 2018
- Preceded by: C. L. Premi
- Succeeded by: Chandrakanta Meghwal
- Constituency: Keshoraipatan (Rajasthan Assembly constituency)

Personal details
- Born: 17 January 1955 (age 71) Lakeri, Bundi, Rajasthan
- Party: Bharatiya Janata Party
- Spouse: Shakuntla Verma
- Children: 2

Baboo Lal Verma as an Indian politician. He is a Cabinet Minister of Food & Civil Supply, Consumer Affairs in Government of Rajasthan and MLA in Keshoraipatan constituency Bundi district from Rajasthan.
