= Gurmeet Singh Kooner =

Indian politician (1948–2023)

Member of the Rajasthan Legislative Assembly
- Succeeded by: Rupinder Singh Kooner
- Constituency: Karanpur

Personal details
- Born: 6 June 1948
- Died: 15 November 2023 (aged 75); New Delhi, India

Gurmeet Singh Kooner was a member of the Rajasthan Legislative Assembly representing the Karanpur constituency for the Indian National Congress (INC), which he won in the 2018 election. He previously represented the constituency following the Assembly elections of 1998, for the INC, and 2008, as an independent. Kooner died in New Delhi on 15 November 2023.
