= Ramlal Jat =

Indian politician (born 1965)

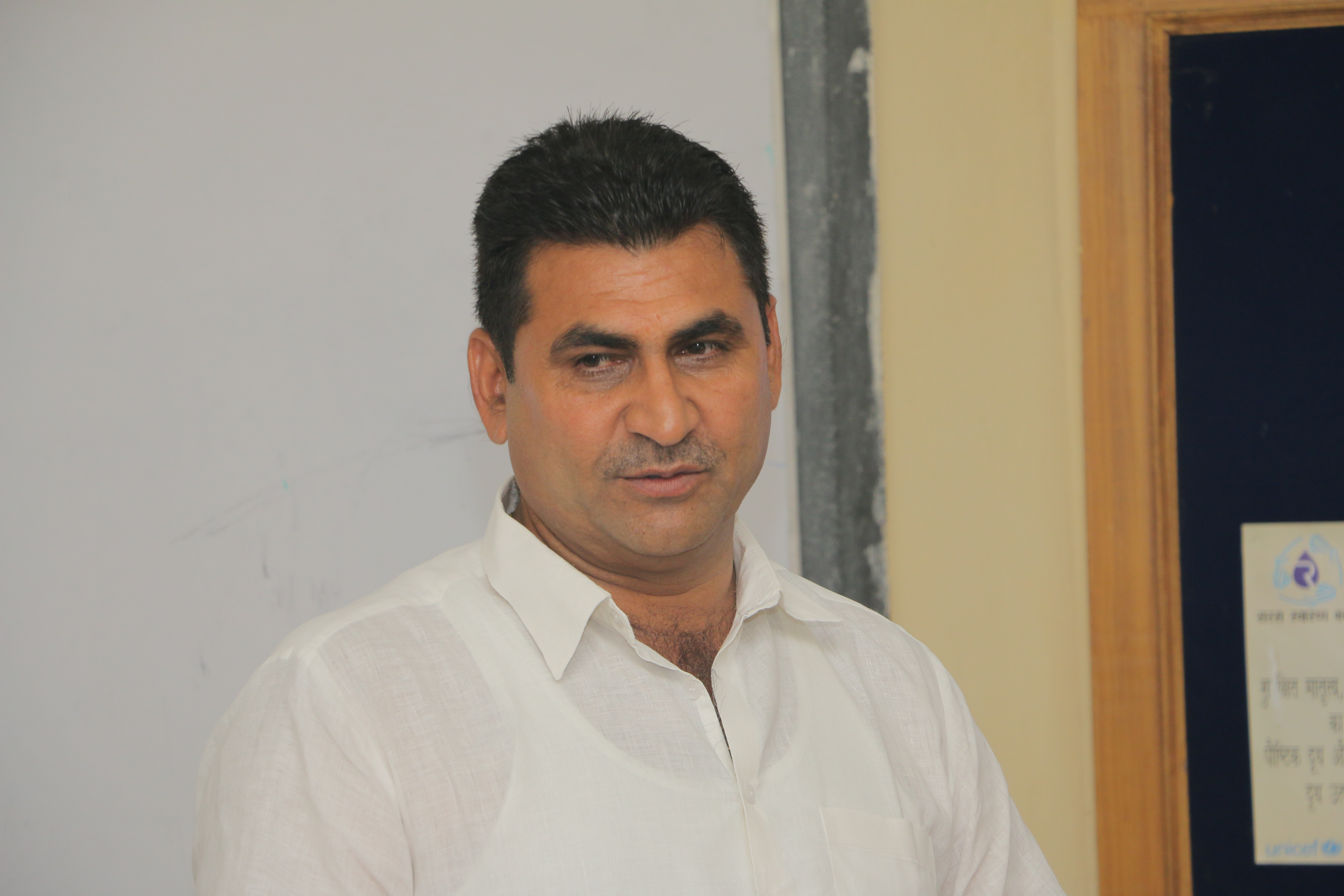

Revenue Minister in Government of Rajasthan
- In office 2021 – December 2023

Member of Rajasthan Legislative Assembly
- In office 1998–2008
- Preceded by: Harish Chaudhary
- Succeeded by: Hemant Meena
- Constituency: Banera
- In office 2008–2013
- Constituency: Mandal Assembly constituency
- In office 2018–2023
- Constituency: Mandal Assembly constituency

Personal details
- Born: 2 May 1965 (age 61) Pratapura Bhilwara, Rajasthan
- Party: Indian National Congress

Ramlal Jat (born 2 May 1965) is an Indian politician from Bhilwara, Rajasthan. He is a member of Indian National Congress. He served as the Revenue minister in the Government of Rajasthan. He is serving as the Chairman of Co-operative Milk Union (Saras Dairy), Bhilwara. He served as the Member of Rajasthan Legislative Assembly for four terms representing Banera constituency during 1998-2008 and Mandal constituency during 2008-2013 and 2018-2023.

== Membership in Assembly ==
Year	Position
1998–2003	Member, 11th Rajasthan Legislative Assembly
2003–2008	Member, 12th Rajasthan Legislative Assembly
2008–2013	Member, 13th Rajasthan Legislative Assembly
2018-2023	Member, 15th Rajasthan Legislative Assembly

== Positions held ==
Year	Position
1982–83	Pragya College President from NSUI, Bijainagar (Ajmer)
1994–1998	Bhilwara-Chittorgarh-Pratapgarh-Banswara-Dugarpur, Co-operative Movement Dairy Chairman
2005	President of Bhilwara- Chittorgarh Milk Producer Cooperative Sugar Limited
1998–2003	MLA Banera-Hurda assembly constituency (11th Rajasthan Legislative Assemblyr)
2003–2008	MLA Banera Hurda assembly constituency (12th Rajasthan Legislative Assembly)
2000–2005	Vice President District Congress Committee, Bhilwara
2001–2006, 2006–present	State President Kisan Khet Mazdoor Congress Rajasthan (Rajasthan)
2008–2013	MLA from Mandal Assembly Constituency (13th Rajasthan Legislative Assembly)
2009-2012	Minister of Forest, Environment, Mines and Petroleum. Government of Rajasthan
2016–present	Chairman of Co-operative Milk Union (Saras Dairy), Bhilwara
2019–Present	Chairman of House Committee of Rajasthan
2021–2023	Minister for Revenues, Government of Rajasthan.
