= Kalu Lal Gurjar =

Indian politician (born 1953)

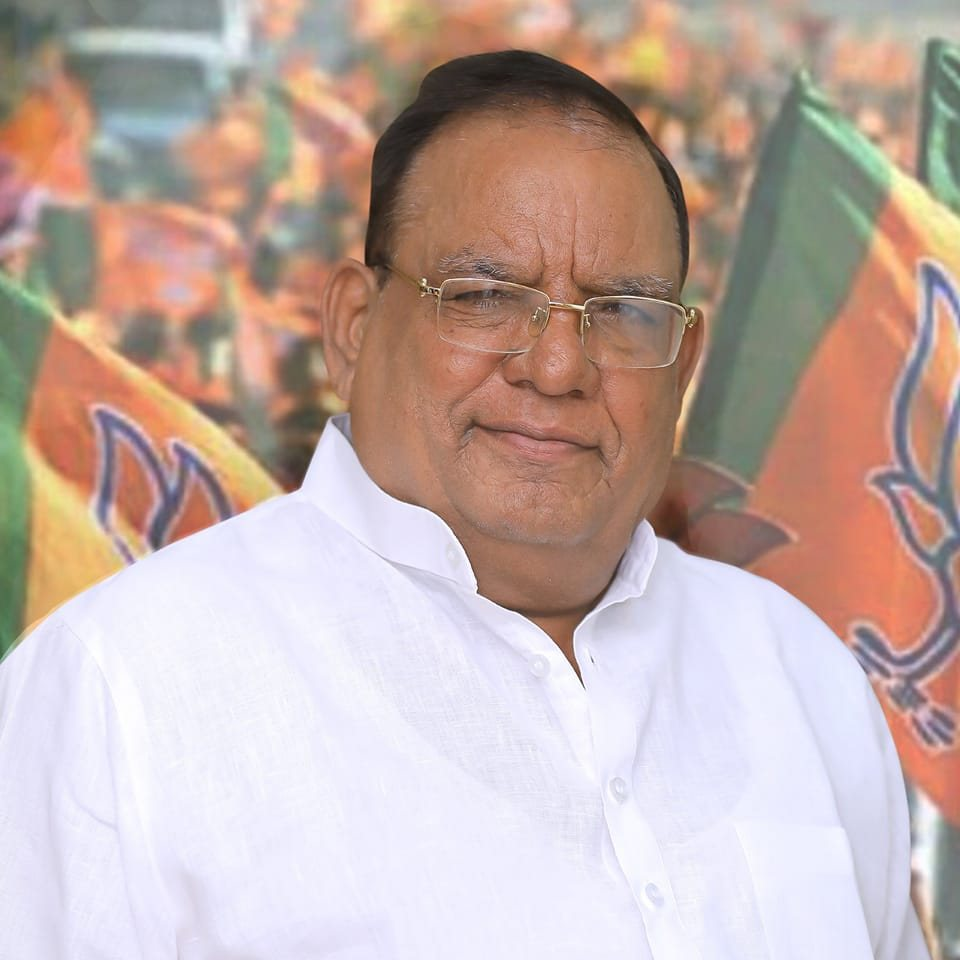

Minister for Mines, Government of Rajasthan
- In office 14 March 1990 – 15 December 1992
- Preceded by: Hari Dev Joshi
- Succeeded by: President's rule

Member of the Rajasthan Legislative Assembly
- In office March 1990 – 1998
- Preceded by: Bihari Lal Pareek
- Succeeded by: Hafij Mohammad
- Constituency: Mandal
- In office 2003–2008
- Preceded by: Hafij Mohammad
- Succeeded by: Ram Lal
- Constituency: Mandal
- In office 2013–2018
- Preceded by: Ram Lal
- Succeeded by: Ramlal Jat
- Constituency: Mandal

Personal details
- Born: 1 May 1953 (age 73) Mandal, Rajasthan, India
- Party: Bharatiya Janata Party
- Spouse: Smt. Saroj Devi Gujar
- Children: 4
- Education: MLV College, Bhilwara
- Occupation: Politician

Kalu Lal Gurjar (born 1 May 1953) is a Bharatiya Janata Party leader and currently the President Of Rajasthan Gujar Mahasabha. He served as the Government Chief Whip in the Rajasthan Legislative Assembly from 2013 to 2018. He also served as the cabinet minister in Government of Rajasthan led by Vasundhara Raje and also served as Mines minister in Government of Rajasthan led by Bhairon Singh Shekhawat. He represents Mandal constituency of Bhilwara district in the assembly and has been elected as Member of the Legislative Assembly for four times. Gujar is also the Chairman of Devnarayan Charitable Trust.

== Early life and education ==
Gujar was born on 1 May 1953 in Gurlan village of Rajasthan. He is son of Rupi Devi Gujar and Ganga Ram Gujar. He belonged to a poor family and both his parents were farmers. He completed his primary education from village Gurlan and he completed his middle education in another village of Rajasthan, named Gatarmala. Then he completed his secondary education from Pur Secondary School. Then he took admission in MLV Government College in Bhilwara and completed his Pre University Class. He continued his studies in the same college up to BA(Hon's) LLB in 1976. Then he started practising in Bhilwara District Court and served as an advocate.

== Political career ==
Gujar entered in politics at the age of 29. Gujar joined Bhartiya Janta Party and in year 1982, he was elected as BJP District General Secretary from Bhilwara. He contested his first Rajasthan Legislative Assembly election in 1985 from Mandal Vidhan Sabha Constituency, from BJP but lost it to INC's Bihari Lal Pareek. In 1990, Gujar again contested the Vidhan Sabha Election to Rajasthan Legislative Assembly from BJP, from Mandal Vidhan Sabha Constituency and won with a margin of 14,916 votes. He served as the Minister for Mines in Government of Rajasthan, led by Chief Minister Bhairon Singh Shekhawat. He was also Minister of State for Industries, Minister of State for Government Undertaking. Gujar also served as the State Minister Of Education Ministry and State Minister for Law and Justice Ministry for a while. Gujar again won the 1993 Rajasthan Vidhan Sabha Election from BJP, from the same constituency with a margin of 13,416 votes, defeating Hafiz Mohammad of Congress.

== Personal life ==
Kalu Lal is married to Saroj Devi Gujar. She served as the Pradhan of Panchayat Samiti Suwana for 2 consecutive terms (10 years). She was the first BJP (Non- Congress) Pradhan since Independence. The Couple have four daughters.

== See also ==
- Bhairon Singh Shekhawat ministry (1990–1992)
