= Lohawat Assembly constituency =

Constituency of the Rajasthan legislative assembly in India

Coordinates: 26.98°N 72.58°E

Lohawat
- Constituency No. 123 for the Rajasthan Legislative Assembly

Constituency details
- Country: India
- Region: North India
- State: Rajasthan
- District: Jodhpur district
- Established: 2008
- Reservation: None

Member of Legislative Assembly
- 16th Rajasthan Legislative Assembly
- Incumbent Gajendra Singh Khimsar
- Party: Bhartiya Janta Party

Lohawat Assembly constituency is one of the 200 Legislative Assembly constituencies of Rajasthan state in India. It is a segment of Jodhpur Lok Sabha constituency and it comprises parts of Phalodi, Osian and Shergarh tehsils, all in Jodhpur district. This seat came into existence after the 2008 delimitation exercise. As of 2023 it is represented by Gajendra Singh Khimsar of the Bharatiya Janata Party.

== Members of the Legislative Assembly ==
Election	Name	Party
2008	Gajendra Singh Khimsar	Bharatiya Janata Party
2013	Gajendra Singh Khimsar	Bharatiya Janata Party
2018	Kishna Ram Vishnoi	Indian National Congress
2023	Gajendra Singh Khimsar	Bharatiya Janata Party

== Election results ==
=== 2023 ===
2023 Rajasthan Legislative Assembly election: Lohawat
Party	Candidate	Votes	%	±%
BJP	Gajendra Singh	81,415	39.05	+3.56
INC	Kishna Ram Vishnoi	70,866	33.99	−23.75
RLP	Satya Narayan Bishnoi	49,859	23.91	
NOTA	None of the above	1,913	0.92	−1.03
Majority		10,549	5.06	−17.19
Turnout		208,488	77.72	−1.4
BJP gain from INC		Swing		

=== 2018 ===
2018 Rajasthan Legislative Assembly election: Lohawat
Party	Candidate	Votes	%	±%
INC	Kishna Ram Vishnoi	106,084	57.74	
BJP	Gajendra Singh Khimsar	65,208	35.49	
Independent	Dr. Magharam Meghwal	5,206	2.83	
BSP	Hari Ram	1,646	0.9	
NOTA	None of the above	3,574	1.95	
Majority		40,876	22.25	
Turnout		183,728	79.12	
INC gain from BJP		Swing		
