= Mandal Assembly constituency =

Legislative Assembly constituency in Rajasthan State, India

Coordinates: 25.44°N 74.58°E

Mandal
- Constituency No. 178 for the Rajasthan Legislative Assembly

Constituency details
- Country: India
- Region: North India
- State: Rajasthan
- District: Bhilwara
- Lok Sabha constituency: Bhilwara
- Total electors: 271,134
- Reservation: None

Member of Legislative Assembly
- 16th Rajasthan Legislative Assembly
- Incumbent Udai Lal Bhadana
- Party: Bharatiya Janata Party

Mandal Assembly constituency is one of the 200 Legislative Assembly constituencies of Rajasthan state in India. It is part of Bhilwara district.

Mandal assembly constituency is considered as gurjar dominant. And the number of gurjar voters in this seat is around 70 thousand.

== Members of the Legislative Assembly ==
Year	Member	Party
1998	Hafij Mohammad	Indian National Congress
2003	Kalu Lal Gurjar	Bharatiya Janata Party
2008	Ramlal Jat	Indian National Congress
2013	Kalu Lal Gurjar	Bharatiya Janata Party
2018	Ramlal Jat	Indian National Congress
2023	Udai Lal Bhadana	Bharatiya Janata Party

== Election results ==
=== 2023 ===
2023 Rajasthan Legislative Assembly election: Mandal
Party	Candidate	Votes	%	±%
BJP	Udai Lal Bhadana	126,291	56.83	+31.82
INC	Ram Lal Jat	90,413	40.69	+9.43
NOTA	None of the above	2,248	1.01	−0.65
Majority		35,878	16.14	+11.91
Turnout		222,222	81.96	+4.4
BJP gain from INC		Swing		

=== 2018 ===
Rajasthan Legislative Assembly Election, 2018: Mandal
Party	Candidate	Votes	%	±%
INC	Ramlal Jat	59,645	31.26	
Independent	Pradhyuman Singh (Happy Banna)	51,580	27.03	
BJP	Kalulal Gurjar	47,726	25.01	
Independent	Udailal Bhadana	23,147	12.13	
Independent	Sua Lal	1,924	1.01	
BSP	Shivlal Gurjar	1,735	0.91	
NOTA	None of the above	3,161	1.66	
Majority		8,065	4.23	
Turnout		190,792	77.56	

== See also ==
- List of constituencies of the Rajasthan Legislative Assembly
- Bhilwara district
