= Anita Singh Gurjar =

Indian politician

Anita Singh Gurjar is an Indian politician belonging to the Bharatiya Janata Party. She is elected to Rajasthan Legislative Assembly from Nagar constituency in Bharatpur district. She has studied B Sc and LLB.
