= Saraswati Vandana Mantra =

Hindu mantra

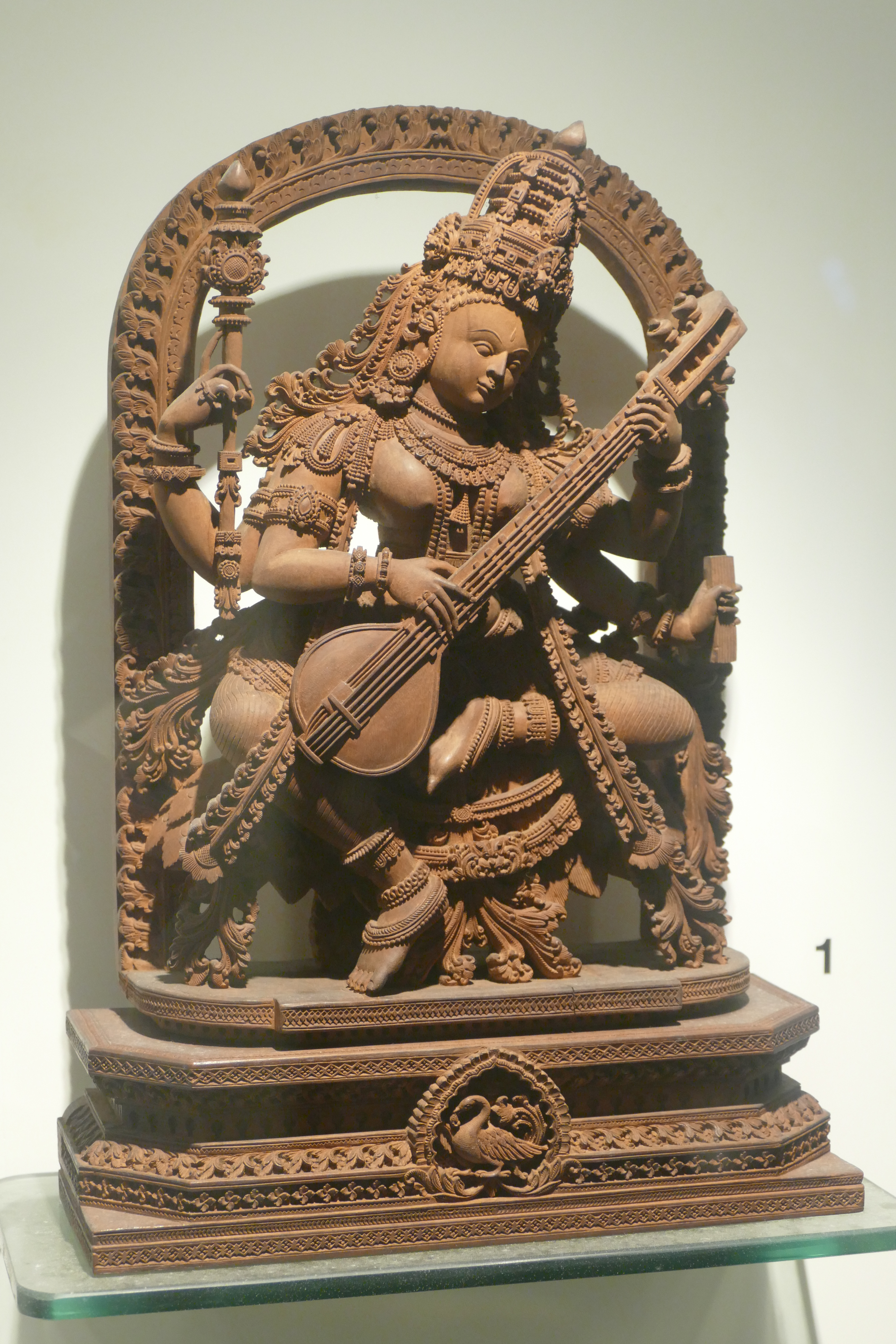
Statue of Saraswati in the Indian Museum, Kolkata

The Saraswati Vandana (Sanskrit: सरस्वती वन्दना, romanized: Sarasvatī Vandanā) is a Hindu mantra. It is addressed to the goddess Saraswati, the goddess of knowledge, music, art, speech, wisdom, and learning.

== Hymn ==
The hymn comprises the following four verses:

या कुन्देन्दुतुषारहारधवला या शुभ्रवस्त्रावृता
या वीणावरदण्डमण्डितकरा या श्वेतपद्मासना ।
या ब्रह्माच्युत शंकरप्रभृतिभिर्देवैः सदा पूजिता
सा मां पातु सरस्वति भगवती निःशेषजाड्यापहा ॥

yā kundendutuṣārahāradhavalā yā śubhravastrāvṛtā
yā vīṇāvaradaṇḍamaṇḍitakarā yā śvetapadmāsanā ।
yā brahmācyuta śaṃkaraprabhṛtibhirdevaiḥ sadā pūjitā
sā māṃ pātu sarasvati bhagavatī niḥśeṣajāḍyāpahā ॥

(Salutations to Saraswati) Who is pure white like the jasmine, with the coolness of the moon, the brightness of the snow, and a sheen like the garland of pearls; Who is covered with pure white garments, whose hands are adorned with the veena (a stringed musical instrument) and the boon-giving staff; And who is seated on a pure white lotus, who is always adored by Brahma, Achyuta (Vishnu), Shankara (Shiva), and the other deities, O goddess Saraswati, please protect me and dispel all my ignorance.
