= Nand Lal Meena (born 1946) =

Indian politician (1946–2025)

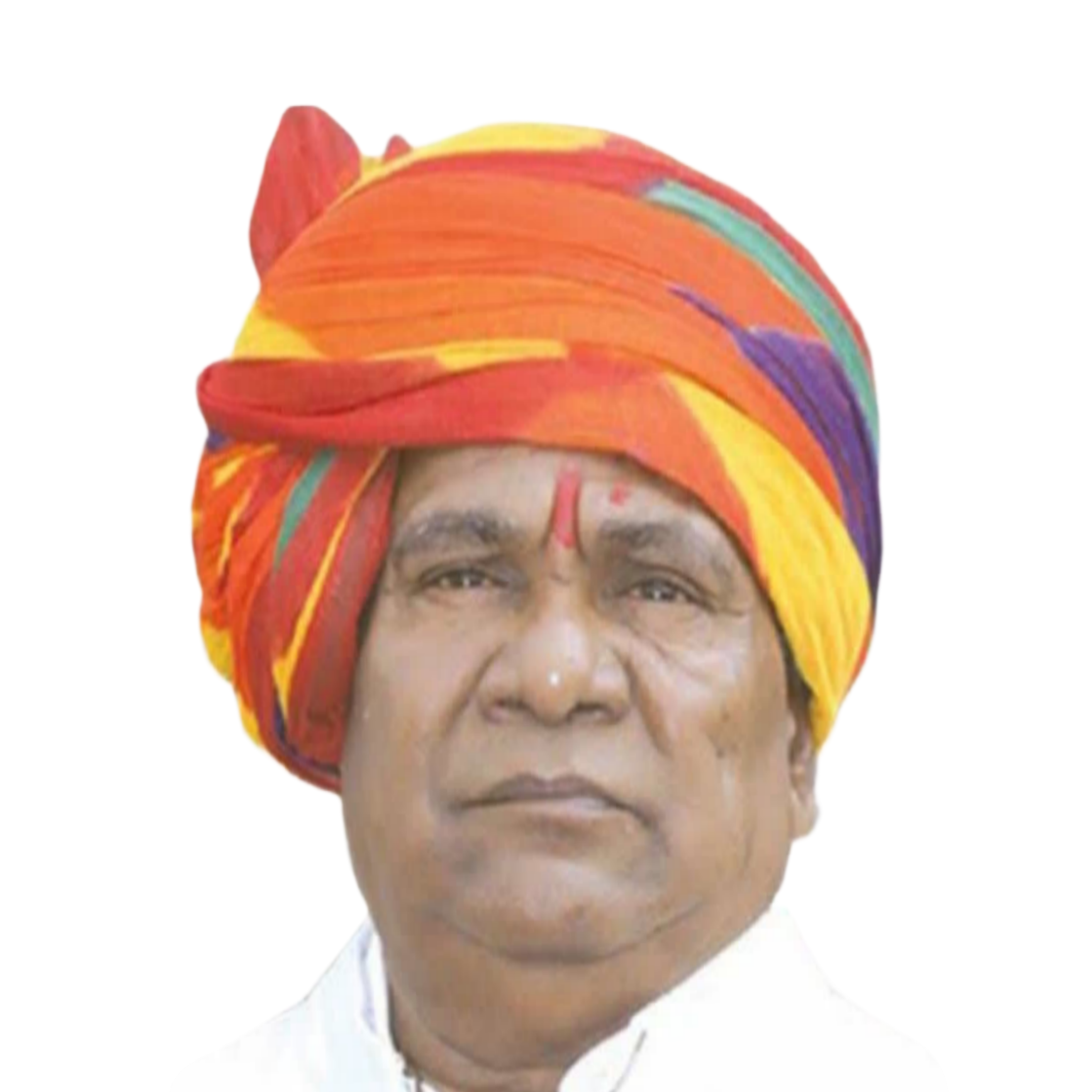
Nandlal Meena

Nand Lal Meena (25 January 1946 – 26 September 2025) was an Indian politician who served as the State Tribal Area Development Minister under Vasundhara Raje ministry. He was elected to Rajasthan Legislative Assembly from Pratapgarh constituency. Meena was also a member of Parliament Lok Sabha from 1989 to 1991, representing Salumbar. He died at a hospital in Ahmedabad on 26 September 2025, at the age of 79.
