= Bhajan Lal Sharma =

14th Chief Minister of Rajasthan (born 1966)

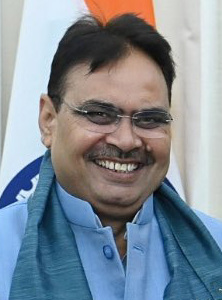
- Official portrait, 2023

14th Chief Minister of Rajasthan
- Incumbent
- Assumed office 15 December 2023
- Governor: Kalraj Mishra; Haribhau Bagade
- Deputy: Diya Kumari; Prem Chand Bairwa
- Ministry and Departments: List: General Administration; Home Affairs; Excise; Personnel; Anti Corruption Bureau; Planning; Policy making cell; Information and Public Relations; Other departments not allocated to any Minister
- Preceded by: Ashok Gehlot

Member of Rajasthan Legislative Assembly
- Incumbent
- Assumed office 3 December 2023
- Preceded by: Ashok Lahoty
- Constituency: Sanganer

General Secretary of Bharatiya Janata Party, Rajasthan
- In office 2016–2023

Vice President of Bharatiya Janata Party, Rajasthan
- In office 2014–2016

Sarpanch of Gram Panchayat Atari
- In office 2000–2005

Personal details
- Born: 15 December 1966 (age 59) Atari, Rajasthan, India
- Party: Bharatiya Janata Party
- Spouse: Geeta Sharma
- Children: 2
- Education: Bachelor of Arts; Master of Arts; Bachelor of Education; Rajasthan University
- Occupation: Politician; businessperson
- Rajasthan Assembly

Bhajan Lal Sharma (born 15 December 1966) is an Indian politician serving as the 14th and current chief minister of Rajasthan and also as leader of the house in state assembly. A member of the Bharatiya Janata Party (BJP), he represents the Sanganer constituency in the 16th Rajasthan Assembly.

== Early and personal life ==
Sharma was born on 15 December 1966, in Atari village near Nadbai in Bharatpur district to Kishan Swaroop Sharma, a Gaur Brahmin farmer family, and Gomati Devi. After completing his primary education in Atari and Gagwana villages and would continue his secondary education at Nadbai. In 1989, Sharma completed his BA at MSJ college in Bharatpur. He completed an MA at the University of Rajasthan in Political Science (1993). He also pursued a B.Ed degree.

He is married to Geeta Sharma and has two sons.

== Political career ==
Sharma began his political career with the Rashtriya Swayamsevak Sangh (RSS) during his school days through its student wing, the Akhil Bharatiya Vidyarthi Parishad (ABVP). In 1990, he participated in the ABVP's Kashmir Bachao Andolan march to Srinagar amid the exodus of Kashmiri Hindus and was arrested in Udhampur. He was also arrested in 1992 for his involvement in the Ram Janmabhoomi agitation during the Babri Mosque demolition. He later went on to become the president of the ABVP in Nadbai and the district co-convener in Bharatpur.

In the early 1990s, Sharma joined the Bharatiya Janata Yuva Morcha (BJYM) and served as its district president thrice. He was elected as the sarpanch of his native village at the age of 27, serving two consecutive terms. Additionally, he held the position of district president for BJP in Bharatpur. Furthermore, he served as the vice president of the Bharatiya Janata Party, Rajasthan, from 2014 to 2016, and later as the General Secretary from 2016 to 2023.

Sharma unsuccessfully contested the 2003 Assembly election from the Nadbai Assembly constituency in Bharatpur on the Rajasthan Samajik Nyay Manch (RSNM)'s ticket and finished fifth, getting just over 5,900 votes and with 6.28% vote share he lost his deposit.

Following the 2023 Rajasthan Legislative Assembly election, Sharma was elected as an MLA from the Sanganer Assembly constituency and was appointed the 14th Chief Minister of Rajasthan.

=== Chief Minister of Rajasthan (2023 - present) ===
On 12 December 2023, he was appointed the 14th Chief Minister of Rajasthan by the Bharatiya Janata Party, with two deputy CMs, Diya Kumari and Prem Chand Bairwa. He, along with his two deputies, was sworn in as Rajasthan's new CM on 15 December 2023.

== See also ==
- Bhajan Lal Sharma ministry
- Government of Rajasthan
- List of chief ministers of Rajasthan

Political offices
Preceded by Ashok Gehlot	Chief Minister of Rajasthan; 2023–present	Incumbent
Preceded by Ashok Lahoty	Member of the Rajasthan Legislative Assembly for Sanganer; 2023–present	Incumbent
