= 2008 Rajasthan Legislative Assembly election =

Election in Indian state

2008 Rajasthan state assembly elections
- 4 December 2008

All 200 seats to the Rajasthan Legislative Assembly 101 seats needed for a majority
- Turnout: 66.49% (▼0.69%)
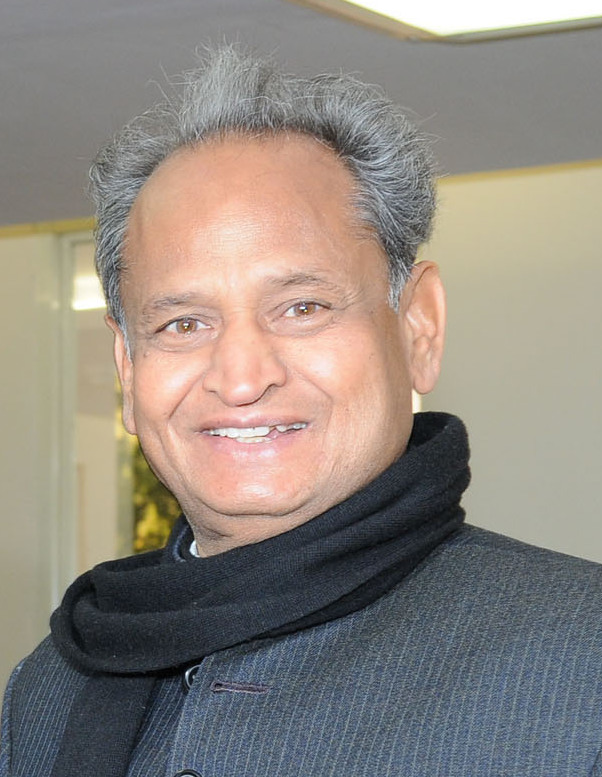

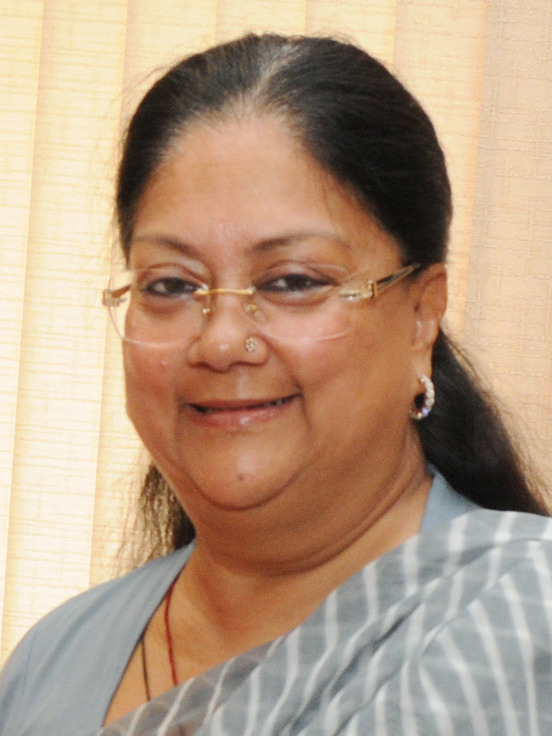

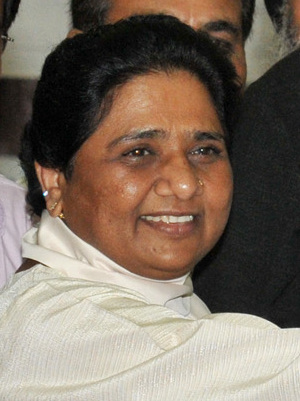
	First party	Second party	Third party
Leader	Ashok Gehlot	Vasundhara Raje	Mayawati
Party	INC	BJP	BSP
Leader since	1 December 1998	8 December 2003	18 September 2003
Leader's seat	Sardarpura	Jhalrapatan	Not Contested
Last election	56	120	2
Seats won	96	78	6
Seat change	▲40	▼42	▲4
Popular vote	8,872,184	8,258,966	1,832,195
Percentage	36.82%	34.27%	7.60%
- Seatwise map of the election results

- Structure of the Rajasthan Legislative Assembly after the election
Chief Minister before election
Vasundhara Raje Scindia
BJP
Elected Chief Minister
Ashok Gehlot
INC

Legislative Assembly elections were held in Indian state of Rajasthan on 4 December 2008. Results were announced on 8 December. The incumbent ruling party BJP lost to Congress.

== Parties and alliances ==
Party/Alliance Name		Flag	Electoral symbol	Leader	Seats contested
NDA	Bharatiya Janata Party			Vasundhara Raje Scindia	193
NDA	Indian National Lok Dal			Om Prakash Chautala	4
Indian National Congress				Ashok Gehlot	200

== Results ==
=== Party-wise list of elected MLAs ===
SN	Party	Seats won	Seats Changed
1	Indian National Congress	96	▲40
2	Bharatiya Janata Party	78	▼42
3	Independents	14	▼1
4	Bahujan Samaj Party	6	▲4
5	Communist Party of India (Marxist)	3	▲2
6	Loktantrik Samajwadi Party	1	▲1
7	Janata Dal (United)	1	▼1
8	Samajwadi Party	1	▲1
	Total	200	

=== Results by District ===
District	Seats				
District	Seats	INC	BJP	IND	OTH
Ganganagar	6	3	1	1	1
Hanumangarh	5	3	1	1	—N/a
Bikaner	7	2	4	1	—N/a
Churu	6	2	4	—N/a	—N/a
Jhunjhunu	7	4	1	—N/a	2
Sikar	8	5	1	—N/a	2
Jaipur	19	7	10	1	1
Alwar	11	3	7	—N/a	1
Bharatpur	7	1	6	—N/a	—N/a
Dholpur	4	—N/a	3	—N/a	1
Karauli	4	1	1	1	1
Dausa	5	1	—N/a	3	1
Sawai Madhopur	4	3	—N/a	—N/a	1
Tonk	4	3	—N/a	1	—N/a
Ajmer	8	4	3	1	—N/a
Nagaur	10	4	5	1	—N/a
Pali	6	1	4	1	—N/a
Jodhpur	10	4	6	—N/a	—N/a
Jaisalmer	2	1	1	—N/a	—N/a
Barmer	7	6	1	—N/a	—N/a
Jalore	5	3	1	1	—N/a
Sirohi	3	1	2	—N/a	—N/a
Udaipur	8	6	2	—N/a	—N/a
Pratapgarh	2	1	1	—N/a	—N/a
Dungarpur	4	4	—N/a	—N/a	—N/a
Banswara	5	3	—N/a	1	1
Chittorgarh	5	5	—N/a	—N/a	—N/a
Rajsamand	4	1	3	—N/a	—N/a
Bhilwara	7	4	3	—N/a	—N/a
Bundi	3	1	2	—N/a	—N/a
Kota	6	3	3	—N/a	—N/a
Baran	4	4	—N/a	—N/a	—N/a
Jhalawar	4	2	2	—N/a	—N/a
Total	200	96	78	14	12

== Elected members ==
#	Constituency	Winner	Party	Votes	Runner up	Party	Votes	Margin
Ganganagar District
1	Sadulshahar	Santosh Kumar Saharan	INC	49,174	Gurjant Singh	BJP	46,299	2,875
2	Ganganagar	Radheshyam Ganganagar	BJP	48,453	Rajkumar Gaur	INC	36,409	12,044
3	Karanpur	Gurmeet Singh Kooner	IND	46,032	Surendra Pal Singh	BJP	39,937	6,095
4	Suratgarh	Ganga Jal	INC	43,590	Rajender Singh Bhadu	IND	33,781	9,809
5	Raisinghnagar (SC)	Daulat Raj	INC	66,261	Nihalchand	BJP	61,219	5,042
6	Anupgarh (SC)	Pawan Kumar Duggal	CPI(M)	48,647	Kuldeep Indora	INC	26,897	21,570
Hanumangarh District
7	Sangaria	Param Navadeep	INC	36,802	Damyanti Beniwal	BJP	28,685	8,117
8	Hanumangarh	Vinod Kumar Lilawali	INC	61,079	Ram Pratap	BJP	60,693	386
9	Pilibanga (SC)	Aad Ram	INC	52,745	Dharmendra Kumar	BJP	46,271	6,474
10	Nohar	Abhishek Matoria	BJP	57,023	Suchitra Arya	INC	46,746	10,277
11	Bhadra	Jaideep	IND	76,071	Sanjeev Beniwal	INC	40,796	35,275
Bikaner District
12	Khajuwala (SC)	Vishwanath Meghwal	BJP	25,985	Govind Ram Meghwal	INC	25,118	867
13	Bikaner West	Gopal Krishan	BJP	56,572	Bulaki Das Kalla	INC	37711	18,861
14	Bikaner East	Sidhi Kumari	BJP	60,591	Tanveer Malawat	INC	22,938	37,653
15	Kolayat	Devi Singh Bhati	BJP	62,078	Hukama Ram	INC	40,732	21,346
16	Lunkaransar	Virendra Beniwal	INC	47,050	Laxmi Narayan	INLD	23,447	23,603
17	Dungargarh	Mangal Ram Godara	INC	54,868	Kishna Ram	IND	44,250	10,618
18	Nokha	Kanhaya Lal Jhanwar	IND	49,736	Rameshwar Lal Dudi	INC	47,519	2,277
Churu District
19	Sadulpur	Kamla Kaswan	BJP	47,244	Virendra Singh	BSP	40,649	6,595
20	Taranagar	Rajendra Singh Rathore	BJP	54,517	Chandrashekhar Baid	INC	36,904	17,613
21	Sardarshahar	Ashok Kumar	BJP	73,902	Bhanwar Lal Sharma	INC	64,128	9,774
22	Churu	Haji Maqbool Mandela	INC	56,458	Harlal Saharan	BJP	48,347	8,111
23	Ratangarh	Raj Kumar Rinwa	BJP	54,860	Abhinesh Maharshi	INC	37,009	17,851
24	Sujangarh (SC)	Master Bhanwarlal Meghwal	INC	56,292	Khemaram Meghwal	BJP	42,231	14,061
Jhunjhunu District
25	Pilani (SC)	Sunderlal	BJP	43,507	Hanuman Prasad	INC	40,260	3,246
26	Surajgarh	Sharwan Kumar	INC	44,985	Santosh Ahlawat	BJP	37,771	7,214
27	Jhunjhunu	Brijendra Singh Ola	INC	38,571	Dr. Mool Singh Shekhawat	BJP	29,255	9,316
28	Mandawa	Rita Choudhary	INC	28,502	Narendra Kumar	IND	28,097	405
29	Nawalgarh	Rajkumar Sharma	BSP	50,273	Pratibha Singh	INC	36,193	14,080
30	Udaipurwati	Rajendra Singh Gudha	BSP	28,478	Vijendra Singh	INC	20,641	7,837
31	Khetri	Jitendra Singh	INC	33,639	Dharampal Gurjar	BJP	22,572	11,067
Sikar District
32	Fatehpur	Bhanwaru Khan	INC	47,590	Nand Kishore Maharia	BJP	39,326	8,264
33	Lachhmangarh	Govind Singh Dotasara	INC	31,705	Dinesh Joshi	IND	31,671	32
34	Dhod (SC)	Pema Ram	CPI(M)	47,840	Parasram Mordiya	INC	44,695	3,145
35	Sikar	Rajendra Pareek	INC	46,976	Mahesh Sharma	BJP	39,210	7,766
36	Dantaramgarh	Amra Ram	CPI(M)	45,909	Narayan Singh	INC	40,990	4,919
37	Khandela	Banshidhar Bajiya	BJP	49,398	Mahadev Singh	INC	39,500	9,898
38	Neem Ka Thana	Ramesh Chand Khandelwal	INC	64,075	Prem Singh Bajore	BJP	41,416	22,659
39	Srimadhopur	Deependra Singh Shekhawat	INC	36,590	Harlal Singh Kharra	BJP	29,357	7,233
Jaipur District
40	Kotputli	Ramswaroop Kasana	LSP	22,328	Rajender Singh Yadav	INC	21,435	893
41	Viratnagar	Phoolchand Bhinda	BJP	26,660	Ramachandra	INC	22,582	4,078
42	Shahpura(Jaipur)	Rao Rajendra Singh	BJP	44,536	Alok Beniwal	INC	37,321	7,215
43	Chomu	Bhagwan Sahai Saini	INC	45,380	Ramlal Sharma	BJP	45,245	135
44	Phulera	Nirmal Kumawat	BJP	59,140	Dr. Hari Singh	INC	56,430	2,710
45	Dudu (SC)	Babulal Nagar	INC	63,287	Babu Lal Bachher	BJP	57,974	5,313
46	Jhotwara	Rajpal Singh Shekhawat	BJP	68,851	Lalchand Kataria	INC	66,396	2,455
47	Amber	Ganga Sahay	INC	53,179	Naveen Pilania	BJP	49,382	3,797
48	Jamwa Ramgarh (ST)	Gopal Meena	INC	36,451	Jagdish Narayan	BJP	34,398	1,553
49	Hawa Mahal	Brij Kishore Sharma	INC	44,926	Manju Sharma	BJP	44,346	580
50	Vidhyadhar Nagar	Narpat Singh Rajvi	BJP	64,263	Vikram Singh Shekhawat	INC	55,223	9,040
51	Civil Lines	Pratap Singh Khachariyawas	INC	58,166	Ashok Lahoty	BJP	51,205	6,961
52	Kishanpole	Mohan Lal Gupta	BJP	56,245	Ask Ali Tak	INC	51,506	4,739
53	Adarsh Nagar	Ashok Parnami	BJP	52,983	Mahir Azad	INC	51,265	1,718
54	Malviya Nagar	Kalicharan Saraf	BJP	62,011	Rajiv Arora	INC	44,453	17,558
55	Sanganer	Ghanshyam Tiwari	BJP	75,729	Suresh Mishra	INC	42,817	32,912
56	Bagru (SC)	Ganga Devi Verma	INC	57,036	Rakshpal Kuldeep	BJP	53,519	3,517
57	Bassi (ST)	Anju Devi Dhanka	IND	54,098	Kanhaiya Lal	IND	32,166	21,932
58	Chaksu (SC)	Promila	BJP	37,562	Ashok Tanwar	IND	33,324	4,238
Alwar District
59	Tijara	Aimanuddin Ahmad Khan	INC	27,567	Fazal Hussain	BSP	20,736	6,831
60	Kishangarh Bas	Ramhet Singh Yadav	BJP	31,594	Deep Chand Khairiya	INC	29,484	2,110
61	Mundawar	O.P. Yadav	INC	51,790	Manjeet Dharmpal Choudhary	BJP	53,964	3,226
62	Behror	Jaswant Singh Yadav	BJP	56,890	Karan Singh Yadav	INC	36,886	20,004
63	Bansur	Rohitash Kumar	BJP	41,361	Shakuntala Rawat	INC	28,382	12,979
64	Thanagazi	Hem Singh Bhadana	BJP	35,271	Kanti Prasad Meena	IND	33,976	1,295
65	Alwar Rural (SC)	Tika Ram Jully	INC	35,896	Jagdish Prasad	BJP	27,371	8,525
66	Alwar Urban	Bhanwari Lal Singhal	BJP	49,075	Narendra Sharma	INC	35,367	13,708
67	Ramgarh	Gyan Dev Ahuja	BJP	61,493	Zubair Khan	INC	45,411	16,082
68	Rajgarh Laxmangarh (ST)	Suraj Bhan Dhanka	SP	45,002	Johari Lal Meena	INC	44,065	937
69	Kathumar (SC)	Babulal Manager	BJP	49,572	Ramesh Khinchi	INC	47,879	1,693
Bharatpur District
70	Kaman	Zahida Khan	INC	57,332	Nasru Khan	BJP	49,467	7,865
71	Nagar	Anita Gurjar	BJP	22,942	Attar Singh Bhadana	INC	18,358	4,584
72	Deeg-Kumher	Digamber Singh	BJP	52,669	Vishvendra Singh	INC	49,145	3,524
73	Bharatpur	Vijay Bansal	BJP	52,595	Aditya Raj Sharma	BSP	29,109	23,486
74	Nadbai	Krishnendra Kaur	BJP	45,945	Yashwant Singh Ramu	BSP	39,315	6,180
75	Weir (SC)	Bahadur Singh Koli	BJP	33,981	Atar Singh Pagariya	INC	29,516	4,465
76	Bayana (SC)	Gyarsaram	BJP	32,016	Munni Devi	BSP	23,261	8,755
Dholpur District
77	Baseri (SC)	Sukhram Koli	BJP	28,109	Usha	IND	20,635	8,755
78	Bari	Girraj Singh Malinga	BSP	35,895	Jasvant Singh	BJSH	32,965	2,930
79	Dholpur	Abdul Sageer Khan	BJP	28,077	Ashok Sharma	INC	26,523	1,554
80	Rajakhera	Ravindra Singh Bohara	BJP	38,237	Pradhymn Singh	INC	35,333	2,904
Karauli District
81	Todabhim (ST)	Kirodi Lal Meena	IND	87,239	Matadeen Meena	IND	53,327	33,912
82	Hindaun (SC)	Bharosi Lal	INC	30,374	Rajkumari Jatav	BJP	28,519	1,855
83	Karauli	Rohini Kumari	BJP	44,937	Darshan Singh Gurjar	BSP	43,681	1,256
84	Sapotra (ST)	Ramesh Chand Meena	BSP	37,878	Mukhraj	INC	29,549	8,329
Dausa District
85	Bandikui	Ram Kishor	IND	42,200	Shailendra Joshi	BJP	29,250	12,950
86	Mahuwa	Golama	IND	51,610	Vijay Shankar Bohara	BSP	27,479	24,131
87	Sikrai (SC)	Mamta Bhupesh	INC	54,470	Geeta Verma	BJP	27,323	27,147
88	Dausa	Murari Lal Meena	BSP	43,387	Ram Avtar Choudhary	INC	42,285	1,102
89	Lalsot (ST)	Parsadi Lal Meena	IND	49,263	Babu Lal Dhanka	SP	32,258	17,005
Sawai Madhopur District
90	Gangapur	Ramkesh Meena	BSP	42,547	Mansingh Gurjar	BJP	31,176	11,371
91	Bamanwas (ST)	Nawal Kishore Meena	INC	45,204	Sampat Lal Meena	LSP	26,652	18,552
92	Sawai Madhopur	Alauddin Azad	INC	37,952	Kirodi Lal Meena	IND	34,998	2,954
93	Khandar (SC)	Ashok Bairwa	INC	44,440	Hari Narayan	BJP	61,079	10,632
Tonk District
94	Malpura	Ranveer Phalwan	IND	31,365	Dr. Chandrabhan	INC	27,552	3,813
95	Niwai (SC)	Kamla Bairwa	INC	40,105	Satish Chandel	BJP	37,667	2,438
96	Tonk	Zakia Inam	INC	48,452	Mahaveer Prasad	BJP	37,916	10,536
97	Deoli-Uniara	Ram Narayan Meena	INC	55,085	Nathu Singh Gurjar	BJP	43,981	11,104
Ajmer District
98	Kishangarh	Nathu Ram Sinodiya	INC	65,042	Bhagirath Choudhary	BJP	55,318	9,724
99	Pushkar	Naseem Akhtar Insaf	INC	42,881	Bhanwar Singh Palara	BJP	36,347	6,534
100	Ajmer North	Vasudev Devnani	BJP	41,907	Shrigopal Baheti	INC	41,219	688
101	Ajmer South (SC)	Anita Bhadel	BJP	44,902	Dr. Rajkumar Jaipal	INC	25,596	19,306
102	Nasirabad	Mahendra Singh	INC	52,815	Sanwar Lal Jat	BJP	52,744	71
103	Beawar	Shankar Singh	BJP	57,912	K. C. Chaudhary	IND	20,498	37,414
104	Masuda	Brahmdev Kumawat	IND	42,170	Ram Chandra	INC	34,492	7,678
105	Kekri	Raghu Sharma	INC	47,174	Rinku Kanwar	BJP	34,514	12,659
Nagaur District
106	Ladnun	Hajiram Burdak	IND	48,875	Manohar Singh	BJP	40,677	8,198
107	Deedwana	Rupa Ram	INC	61,529	Yunus Khan	BJP	45,040	16,489
108	Jayal (SC)	Manju Devi	INC	43,202	Manju Baghmar	BJP	33,198	10,004
109	Nagaur	Habibur Rahman Ashrafi Lamba	BJP	53,469	Harendra Mirdha	INC	46,569	6,900
110	Khinvsar	Hanuman Beniwal	BJP	58,760	Durg Singh	BSP	34,317	24,443
111	Merta (SC)	Sukharam	BJP	58,476	Pancharam Indawar	INC	34,436	24,040
112	Degana	Ajay Singh Kilak	BJP	49,472	Richpal Singh Mirdha	INC	48,298	1,174
113	Makrana	Zakir Hussain Gesawat	INC	42,906	Shreeram Binchar	BJP	33,151	9,755
114	Parbatsar	Mansingh Kinsariya	BJP	26,704	Lachchha Ram Badarda	IND	25,012	1,692
115	Nawan	Mahendra Chaudhary	INC	62,963	Harish Chand	BJP	41,116	21,847
Pali District
116	Jaitaran	Dilip Choudhary	IND	43,077	Surendra Goyal	BJP	36,409	6,668
117	Sojat (SC)	Sanjana Agri	BJP	32,610	Ratan Panwar	INC	26,709	5,901
118	Pali	Gyanchand Parakh	BJP	49,686	Bheem Raj Bhati	IND	41,996	7,690
119	Marwar Junction	Kesaram Choudhary	BJP	54,737	Kushveer Singh	INC	52,955	1,782
120	Bali	Pushpendra Singh	BJP	61,229	Jai Singh	INC	40,483	20,746
121	Sumerpur	Bina Kak	INC	43,268	Shankar Singh Rajpurohit	BJP	34,451	8,817
Jodhpur District
122	Phalodi	Om Joshi	INC	51,354	Pabba Ram Bishnoi	BJP	44,452	6,902
123	Lohawat	Gajendra Singh Khimsar	BJP	44,437	Malaram Vishnoi	INC	36,742	7,695
124	Shergarh	Babu Singh Rathore	BJP	55,085	Ummed Singh Rathore	INC	52,783	2,302
125	Osian	Mahipal Maderna	INC	37,212	Shambhu Singh	IND	33,814	3,398
126	Bhopalgarh (SC)	Kamasa Meghwal	BJP	48,311	Heera Devi	INC	43,010	4,501
127	Sardarpura	Ashok Gehlot	INC	55,516	Rajendra Gehlot	BJP	40,176	15,340
128	Jodhpur	Kailash Bhansali	BJP	49,122	Jugal Kabra	INC	40,523	8,599
129	Soorsagar	Suryakanta Vyas	BJP	49,154	Sayeed Ansari	INC	43,657	5,497
130	Luni	Malkhan Singh Bishnoi	INC	63,316	Jogaram Patel	BJP	47,817	15,499
131	Bilara (SC)	Arjun Lal Garg	BJP	61,462	Shankar Lal	INC	46,599	14,863
Jaisalmer District
132	Jaisalmer	Chhotu Singh Bhati	BJP	34,072	Sunita	INC	28,297	5,775
133	Pokaran	Saleh Mohammad	INC	42,756	Shaitan Singh	BJP	42,417	339
Barmer District
134	Sheo	Ameen Khan	INC	75,787	Jalam Singh	BJP	45,927	29,860
135	Barmer	Mewaram Jain	INC	62,219	Mradureka Chowdhary	BJP	38,175	24,044
136	Baytoo	Col. Sonaram Choudhary (Retd.)	INC	62,207	Kailash Choudhary	BJP	25,789	36,418
137	Pachpadra	Madan Prajapat	INC	51,702	Amara Ram	BJP	39,577	12,125
138	Siwana	Kan Singh	BJP	32,040	Mahendra Kumar	INC	28,058	3,982
139	Gudamalani	Hemaram Choudhary	INC	62,166	Ladu Ram	BJP	52,889	9,277
140	Chohtan (SC)	Padma Ram	INC	69,400	Tarun Rai Kaga	BJP	45,497	23,526
Jalore District
141	Ahore	Bhag Raj Chowdhary	INC	36,253	Chiranji Lal	BJP	22,502	13,751
142	Jalore (SC)	Ramlal Meghwal	INC	52,741	Jogeshwar Garg	BJP	36,476	16,265
143	Bhinmal	Poora Ram Choudhary	BJP	59,669	Samarjit Singh	INC	38,470	21,199
144	Sanchore	Jeevaram Choudhary	IND	55,257	Sukhram Bishnoi	INC	51,643	3,614
145	Raniwara	Ratan Dewasi	INC	46,716	Narayan Singh Dewal	BJP	26,914	19,802
Sirohi District
146	Sirohi	Otaram Devasi	BJP	56,400	Sanyam Lodha	INC	47,830	8,570
147	Pindwara-Abu (ST)	Gangaben Garasiya	INC	40,018	Durgaram Garasiya	BJP	36,672	3,346
148	Reodar (SC)	Jagasi Ram Koli	BJP	47,402	Neeraj Dangi	INC	44,164	3,238
Udaipur District
149	Gogunda (ST)	Mangi Lal Garasiya	INC	56,157	Hunsa Ram Garasiya	BJP	46,045	10,112
150	Jhadol (ST)	Babulal Kharadi	BJP	46,654	Heeralal Dangi	INC	39,355	7,319
151	Kherwara (ST)	Dayaram Parmar	INC	68,702	Nanalal Ahari	BJP	53,945	14,757
152	Udaipur Rural (ST)	Sajjan Katara	INC	55,494	Vandana Meena	BJP	44,798	10,696
153	Udaipur	Gulab Chand Kataria	BJP	65,796	Trilok Purbia	INC	41,197	24,509
154	Mavli	Pushkar Lal Dangi	INC	58,289	Dharmnarayan Joshi	BJP	53,556	4,733
155	Vallabhnagar	Gajendra Singh Shaktawat	INC	59,995	Randhir Singh Bhindar	BJP	53,335	6,660
156	Salumber (ST)	Raghuveer Meena	INC	65,140	Narendra Kumar Meena	BJP	41,787	23,353
Pratapgarh District
157	Dhariawad (ST)	Nagraj Meena	INC	66,147	Gotam Lal Meena	BJP	48,475	17,672
Dungarpur District
158	Dungarpur (ST)	Lalshankar Ghatiya	INC	48,536	Sushila Bhil	BJP	36,915	11,621
159	Aspur (ST)	Raiyaji Meena	INC	59,159	Prakrati Kharadi	BJP	44,612	14,547
160	Sagwara (ST)	Surendra Kumar	INC	73,408	Kanak Mal Katara	BJP	41,082	32,326
161	Chorasi (ST)	Shankar Lal Ahari	INC	46,023	Sushil Katara	BJP	39,809	6,214
Banswara District
162	Ghatol (ST)	Nanalal Ninama	IND	53,262	Navnit Lal	BJP	32,640	20,622
163	Garhi (ST)	Kanta Garasiya	INC	63,360	Dharmendra Rathore	BJP	37,927	25,433
164	Banswara (ST)	Arjun Singh Bamniya	INC	47,753	Dhan Singh Rawat	BJP	31,904	15,849
165	Bagidora (ST)	Mahendrajeet Singh Malviya	INC	76,113	Jeetmalkhant	JD(U)	31,424	44,689
166	Kushalgarh (ST)	Fateh Singh	JD(U)	37,610	Savlal	INC	36,653	957
Chittorgarh District
167	Kapasan (SC)	Shankar Lal Bairwa	INC	50,147	Arjun Lal Jingar	IND	43,493	6,654
168	Begun	Rajendra Singh Bidhuri	INC	59,106	Chunni Lal Dhakar	BJP	58,463	643
169	Chittorgarh	Surendra Singh Jadawat	INC	67,959	Shrichand Kriplani	BJP	56,408	11,551
170	Nimbahera	Udai Lal Anjana	INC	95,622	Ashok Kumar Navlakha	BJP	57,112	38,510
171	Bari Sadri	Prakash Chaudhary	INC	80,402	Bheru Singh Chauhan	BJP	53,813	26,589
Pratapgarh District
172	Pratapgarh (ST)	Nandlal Meena	BJP	65,134	Bhadurlal Meena	INC	51,291	13,843
Rajsamand District
173	Bhim	Harisingh Rawat	BJP	38,262	Lakshman Singh Rawat	INC	37,532	730
174	Kumbhalgarh	Ganesh Singh Parmar	INC	50,193	Surendra Singh Rathore	BJP	46,019	4,174
175	Rajsamand	Kiran Maheshwari	BJP	54,275	Hari Singh Rathore	INC	48,817	5,458
176	Nathdwara	Kalyansingh Chauhan	BJP	62,216	C.P. Joshi	INC	62,215	1
Bhilwara District
177	Asind	Ram Lal Gurjar	BJP	63,325	Hagamilal Mewara	INC	59,213	4,112
178	Mandal	Ramlal Jat	INC	58,696	Kalu Lal Gurjar	BJP	56,830	2,316
179	Sahara	Kailash Chandra Trivedi	INC	59,874	Ratan Lal Jat	BJP	46,368	13,506
180	Bhilwara	Vitthal Shankar Avasthi	BJP	59,490	Om Prakash Naraniwal	INC	42,213	17,277
181	Shahpura(Bhilwara)	Mahaveer Prasad Mochi	INC	53,233	Shrikishan Songara	BJP	46,855	6,378
182	Jahazpur	Shivajiram Meena	BJP	56,339	Dheeraj Gurjar	INC	54,474	1,855
183	Mandalgarh	Pradeep Kumar Singh	INC	35,675	Kirti Kumari	BJP	34,187	1,488
Bundi District
184	Hindoli	Prabhu Lal Saini	BJP	46,123	Harimohan Sharma	INC	40,043	6,080
185	Keshoraipatan (SC)	Chunni Lal Premi	INC	49,047	Gopal Pacherwal	BJP	45,631	3,416
186	Bundi	Ashok Dogara	BJP	56,992	Mamta Sharma	INC	46,249	10,743
Kota District
187	Pipalda	Premchand	INC	38,709	Manvendra Singh	BJP	27,836	10,873
188	Sangod	Bharat Singh Kundanpur	INC	52,294	Heera Lal Nagar	BJP	42,930	9,364
189	Kota North	Shanti Dhariwal	INC	68,560	Suman Shringi	BJP	46,829	21,731
190	Kota South	Om Birla	BJP	74,381	Ramkishan	INC	50,129	24,252
191	Ladpura	Bhawani Singh Rajawat	BJP	58,395	Naimuddin	INC	57,645	750
192	Ramganj Mandi (SC)	Chandrakanta Meghwal	BJP	45,106	Ramgopal	INC	43,232	1,874
Baran District
193	Anta	Pramod Jain Bhaya	INC	56,519	Raghuveer Singh Kaushal	BJP	26,851	29,668
194	Kishanganj	Nirmala Sahariya	INC	52,578	Hemraj Meena	BJP	36,200	16,378
195	Baran-Atru (SC)	Panachand Meghwal	INC	64,697	Madan Dilawar	BJP	48,123	16,574
196	Chhabra	Karan Singh Rathore	INC	58,771	Pratap Singh Singhvi	BJP	51,823	6,948
Jhalawar District
197	Dag (SC)	Madan Lal	INC	58,537	Ram Lal	BJP	56,828	1,701
198	Jhalrapatan	Vasundhara Raje	BJP	81,593	Mohan Lal	INC	49,012	32,581
199	Khanpur	Anil Kumar	BJP	63,664	Meenakshi Chandrawat	INC	58,709	4,955
200	Manohar Thana	Kailash Chand Meena	INC	70,151	Shyam Sunder	BJP	57,047	13,104

== See also ==
- Member of the Legislative Assembly (India)
