= Meghwal (surname) =

- Language: Hindi, Rajasthani, Gujarati, Sanskrit

Origin
- Origin: Indian subcontinent
- Region of origin: Rajasthan, Gujarat, Madhya Pradesh, Uttar Pradesh

Other names
- Variant forms: Meghvar, Meghwanshi

Meghwal (Hindi: मेघवाल) is an Indian surname primarily associated with the Meghwal community, a historically marginalised community found mainly in the Indian states of Rajasthan, Gujarat, Madhya Pradesh, and parts of Uttar Pradesh. The community is traditionally linked with occupations such as weaving, agriculture, and village services.

== Etymology ==
The term Meghwal is believed to be derived from the Sanskrit word Megha (cloud), symbolically associated with rain, fertility, and agriculture. Another interpretation connects the name with the community’s historical association with weaving and village-based occupations in arid regions, where rain and clouds held special cultural significance.

Meghwal is a surname used by the Meghwal community and people from Rajasthan. Notable individuals with this surname are listed below.

== Notable people ==
- Arjun Ram Meghwal - Indian politician, serving as the 34th Minister of law and justice.
- Aduram Meghwal – MLA from the Chohtan in Barmer district.
- Amrita Meghwal – Former MLA from the Jalore Constituency.
- Babu Lal Meghwal – Indian politician and former Member of Parliament.
- Bharat Ram Meghwal – Indian politician and former Member of Parliament from the Ganganagar.
- Bhanwarlal Meghwal – Former Cabinet Minister, Government of Rajasthan, 5-times Ex-MLA from the Sujangarh.
- Goparam Meghwal – Indian politician and former MLA from the Siwana.
- Govind Ram Meghwal - Former Cabinet Minister, Government of Rajasthan.
- Pana Chand Meghwal – Former MLA from the Baran-Atru Constituency.
- Kamsa Meghwal – Indian politician and former MLA from the Bikaner East constituency.
- Kailash Chandra Meghwal – Former Speaker of the Rajasthan Legislative Assembly and MLA from the Shahpura.
- Kaluram Meghwal – MLA from the Dag constituency.
- Laxmanram Meghwal – Indian politician and former MLA from the Bikaner East constituency in the Rajasthan Legislative Assembly.
- Manju Meghwal - Indian politician, elected to the Rajasthan Legislative Assembly from Jayal constituency.
- Madan Lal Meghwal – Ex–MLA from the Jayal Assembly constituency.
- Manoj Meghwal – Indian politician and MLA from the Sujangarh.
- Padma Ram Meghwal – Indian politician and Ex-MLA from the Chohtan.
- Rampal Meghwal – Indian politician and former MLA from the Bikaner West.
- Manju Meghwal – Ex–MLA from the Jayal Assembly constituency.
- Vishwanath Meghwal – 3rd-Term MLA from the Khajuwala constituency.

== See also ==
- Meghwal
- Scheduled Castes
- Caste system in India
