= Pushkar Lal Dangi =

Indian politician

Member of the Rajasthan Legislative Assembly
- In office 2008–2013
- Incumbent
- Assumed office 2023
- Preceded by: Dharmnarayan Joshi
- Constituency: Mavli

Personal details
- Born: 1966 (age 58–59); Mavli, Udaipur district, Rajasthan
- Political party: Indian National Congress

Pushkar Lal Dangi (born 1966) is an Indian politician from Rajasthan. He is a member of the Rajasthan Legislative Assembly from Mavli Assembly constituency in Udaipur district. He won the 2023 Rajasthan Legislative Assembly election representing the Indian National Congress.

== Early life and education ==
Dangi is from Mavli, Udaipur district, Rajasthan. He is the son of Mangilal Dangi. He studied Class 10 and passed the examination in 1984 conducted by the Secondary Education Board of Rajasthan.

== Career ==
Dangi won from Mavli Assembly constituency representing the Indian National Congress in the 2023 Rajasthan Legislative Assembly election. He polled 77,696 votes and defeated his nearest rival, Krishnagopal Paliwal of the Bharatiya Janata Party, by a margin of 1,567 votes. In the 2018 Rajasthan Legislative Assembly election, he lost to Dharmnarayan Joshi of the Bharatiya Janata Party and to Dali Chand Dangi in the 2013 Rajasthan Legislative Assembly election.
