= Jodhpur Municipal Corporation =

Local civic body in Jodhpur, Rajasthan, India

Type
- Type: Municipal Corporation of the Jodhpur

History
- Founded: 17 December 1992; 33 years ago

Leadership
- Mayor: Prasann Chand Mehta, BJP since 2026
- Deputy Mayor: Vijay Singh Panwar, BJP

Structure
- Political groups: Government (53): BJP (45); IND (8); Opposition (47): INC (44); RLP (1); IND (2)

Elections
- Next election: 2031

Website
- Jodhpur Municipal Corporation

Jodhpur Municipal Corporation (MCJ) is the municipal corporation of Jodhpur city in the Indian state of Rajasthan. It is responsible for civic infrastructure and administration of the city. MCJ is divided into 100 wards and each represented by an elected member. It consist of three Vidhan Sabha constituencies Jodhpur, Soorsagar and Sardarpura.

== Wards ==
Wards	Councillors		Assembly constituency
Wards	Name	Party	Assembly constituency
Ward 1 (SC)	Jagdish	Indian National Congress	Jodhpur
Ward 2 (SC-W)	Vimla	Indian National Congress	Jodhpur
Ward 3 (W)	Monika Vyas	Bharatiya Janata Party	Soorsagar
Ward 4 (ST-W)	Mona Rathod	Indian National Congress	Jodhpur
Ward 5	Vishal Sankhla	Independent	Jodhpur
Ward 6 (ST)	Baburam Nayak	Bharatiya Janata Party	Jodhpur
Ward 7	Giridhari Singh	Indian National Congress	Jodhpur
Ward 8 (OBC)	Fatehraj Suthar	Bharatiya Janata Party	Soorsagar
Ward 9	Sanjay Bishnoi	Bharatiya Janata Party	Soorsagar
Ward 10 (OBC)	Sukharam Chaudhary	Indian National Congress	Jodhpur
Ward 11 (W)	Seema Kanwar	Bharatiya Janata Party	Jodhpur
Ward 12 (W)	Priyanka Baheti	Bharatiya Janata Party	Soorsagar
Ward 13 (W)	Dipika Mathur	Bharatiya Janata Party	Jodhpur
Ward 14 (W)	Sonia Ramchandani	Bharatiya Janata Party	Soorsagar
Ward 15	Priyanshu Sankhla	Bharatiya Janata Party	Jodhpur
Ward 16	Vikram Singh Panwar	Bharatiya Janata Party	Jodhpur
Ward 17	Vaibhav	Bharatiya Janata Party	Jodhpur
Ward 18	Bhanu Kumar Satyani	Bharatiya Janata Party	Jodhpur
Ward 19 (OBC)	Dinesh Sharma	Independent	Jodhpur
Ward 20 (OBC)	Chetan	Independent	Jodhpur
Ward 21 (OBC)	Zakir Khan	Indian National Congress	Jodhpur
Ward 22	Pradeep Gang	Indian National Congress	Jodhpur
Ward 23	Ashok Singh Chauhan	Bharatiya Janata Party	Jodhpur
Ward 24 (W)	Bhagyashree Acharya	Bharatiya Janata Party	Jodhpur
Ward 25	Kamlesh Purohit	Bharatiya Janata Party	Jodhpur
Ward 26 (SC)	Dhanraj	Bharatiya Janata Party	Jodhpur
Ward 27	Kasim	Independent	Jodhpur
Ward 28	Vikash Ragwani	Bharatiya Janata Party	Jodhpur
Ward 29 (OBC-W)	Afsana Bano	Independent	Jodhpur
Ward 30 (OBC-W)	Saina Bano	Indian National Congress	Jodhpur
Ward 31	Sahabuddin	Indian National Congress	Jodhpur
Ward 32 (SC-W)	Sarita	Indian National Congress	Jodhpur
Ward 33 (W)	Shaheen Ansari	Indian National Congress	Jodhpur
Ward 34 (SC)	Gautam Sankhla	Bharatiya Janata Party	Jodhpur
Ward 35 (SC)	Pradeep Panwar	Indian National Congress	Jodhpur
Ward 36 (OBC)	Gouri Shankar	Indian National Congress	Jodhpur
Ward 37	Kanhaiya Lal Pareek	Bharatiya Janata Party	Jodhpur
Ward 38	Abdul Hakeem	Indian National Congress	Jodhpur
Ward 39 (SC)	Amar Lal	Bharatiya Janata Party	Jodhpur
Ward 40	Nareshchandra Joshi	Indian National Congress	Jodhpur
Ward 41 (OBC-W)	Divya Prajapat	Bharatiya Janata Party	Jodhpur
Ward 42	Meghraj Lohiya	Bharatiya Janata Party	Jodhpur
Ward 43	Nagendra Singh Shekhawat	Bharatiya Janata Party	Jodhpur
Ward 44 (W)	Meenakshi Kothari	Bharatiya Janata Party	Jodhpur
Ward 45	Sunil Kumar	Bharatiya Janata Party	Jodhpur
Ward 46 (W)	Rekha Gahlot	Indian National Congress	Jodhpur
Ward 47	Mohan Chaudhary	Independent	Jodhpur
Ward 48 (W)	Durga Mewara	Independent	Jodhpur
Ward 49	Shyamlal Bishnoi	Indian National Congress	Jodhpur
Ward 50 (OBC)	Hema Ram Chaudhri	Bharatiya Janata Party	Jodhpur
Ward 51 (W)	Saraswati Prajapat	Indian National Congress	Jodhpur
Ward 52 (W)	Pinky Devi	Bharatiya Janata Party	Jodhpur
Ward 53 (OBC)	Mahendra Singh Parihar	Indian National Congress	Jodhpur
Ward 54	Rakesh Singh Bagrecha	Bharatiya Janata Party	Jodhpur
Ward 55	Ganpat Singh Chauhan	Indian National Congress	Jodhpur
Ward 56 (W)	Pushpa Devi	Indian National Congress	Jodhpur
Ward 57 (W)	Parveen Akhtar	Indian National Congress	Jodhpur
Ward 58	Kanaram	Indian National Congress	Jodhpur
Ward 59 (W)	Lata	Indian National Congress	Jodhpur
Ward 60 (OBC-W)	Divya Solanki	Indian National Congress	Jodhpur
Ward 61 (OBC-W)	Manisha	Bharatiya Janata Party	Jodhpur
Ward 62 (OBC)	Sanjay Daiya	Bharatiya Janata Party	Jodhpur
Ward 63	Gyas Mohammed	Indian National Congress	Jodhpur
Ward 64	Rajesh Singh Kachhwaha	Bharatiya Janata Party	Jodhpur
Ward 65 (OBC)	Wasim	Indian National Congress	Jodhpur
Ward 66	Mohammed Irfan	Rashtriya Loktantrik Party	Jodhpur
Ward 67	Dinesh Mewara	Bharatiya Janata Party	Jodhpur
Ward 68 (W)	Yasmeen	Indian National Congress	Jodhpur
Ward 69	Liaquat Ali Rangrez	Independent	Jodhpur
Ward 70 (OBC)	Muhammad Aslam	Indian National Congress	Jodhpur
Ward 71 (W)	Shubh Lakshmi Purohit	Indian National Congress	Jodhpur
Ward 72	Irfan Abbasi	Indian National Congress	Jodhpur
Ward 73	Mohammad Danish Khan Moyal	Indian National Congress	Jodhpur
Ward 74 (OBC)	Jitendar Kelawat	Indian National Congress	Jodhpur
Ward 75	Jethu Singh Parihar	Indian National Congress	Jodhpur
Ward 76 (SC-W)	Nirmala Nayak	Independent	Jodhpur
Ward 77	Aidan Ram	Indian National Congress	Jodhpur
Ward 78 (W)	Jamna	Bharatiya Janata Party	Jodhpur
Ward 79	Jitendra Pal Singh	Indian National Congress	Jodhpur
Ward 80	Chain Singh Inda	Bharatiya Janata Party	Jodhpur
Ward 81	Swaroop Singh	Independent	Jodhpur
Ward 82	Prasann Chand Mehta	Bharatiya Janata Party	Jodhpur
Ward 83 (SC)	Umesh Paliya	Bharatiya Janata Party	Jodhpur
Ward 84	Abdul Kareem	Indian National Congress	Jodhpur
Ward 85	Geeta	Bharatiya Janata Party	Jodhpur
Ward 86 (SC)	Jitendra Samariya	Indian National Congress	Jodhpur
Ward 87 (SC)	Chetan Prakash	Indian National Congress	Jodhpur
Ward 88 (SC)	Ashok Kumarr Khichi	Bharatiya Janata Party	Jodhpur
Ward 89 (OBC-W)	Pooja Soni	Bharatiya Janata Party	Sardarpura
Ward 90 (OBC-W)	Sweety Chavda	Bharatiya Janata Party	Sardarpura
Ward 91 (SC-W)	Kanta Naval	Indian National Congress	Sardarpura
Ward 92 (OBC)	Kuldeep Jangid	Bharatiya Janata Party	Sardarpura
Ward 93	Subhash Gehlot	Bharatiya Janata Party	Sardarpura
Ward 94	Latesh Bhati	Indian National Congress	Sardarpura
Ward 95 (W)	Naseem Bano	Indian National Congress	Sardarpura
Ward 96	Buddhi Prakash Dadhich	Bharatiya Janata Party	Sardarpura
Ward 97 (W)	Shabnam Sheka	Indian National Congress	Sardarpura
Ward 98	Vijay Singh	Bharatiya Janata Party	Sardarpura
Ward 99 (W)	Nikita	Bharatiya Janata Party	Sardarpura
Ward 100	Mayank Deora	Indian National Congress	Sardarpura
