= Samarjit Singh =

Indian politician

Samarjit Singh (born 7 March 1967) is an Indian politician from Rajasthan. He is a three time member of the Rajasthan Legislative Assembly from Bhinmal Assembly constituency in Jalore district. He won the 2023 Rajasthan Legislative Assembly election representing the Indian National Congress Party.

== Early life and education ==
Singh is from Daspan, Bhinmal tehsil, Jalore district, Rajasthan. He is the son of Surajpal Singh. He completed his MPhil in 1991 and his doctorate in 1993. Earlier in 1989, he also did his MA at Jai Narain Vyas University, Jodhpur.

== Career ==
Singh won from Bhinmal Assembly constituency representing the Indian National Congress in the 2023 Rajasthan Legislative Assembly election. He polled 97,157 votes and defeated his nearest rival, Poora Ram Choudhary of the Bharatiya Janata Party, by a margin of 1,027 votes. In the 2018 Rajasthan Legislative Assembly election, he lost to Poora Ram Choudhary of the BJP by a margin of 9,646 votes. Earlier in the 2008 elections also, he lost on INC ticket to Choudhary of BJP by a margin of 21,199 votes.

He first became an MLA winning the 1998 Rajasthan Legislative Assembly election and retained the seat for Congress in the 2003 Assembly election. He declared assets of Rs.7.9 crore in the 2023 affidavit to the Election Commission of India, where he also stated that he had no criminal cases registered against him.
