= Nimbahera Assembly constituency =

Legislative Assembly constituency in Rajasthan State, India

Coordinates: 24.63°N 74.68°E

Nimbahera
- Constituency No. 170 for the Rajasthan Legislative Assembly

Constituency details
- Country: India
- Region: North India
- State: Rajasthan
- District: Chittorgarh
- Lok Sabha constituency: Chittorgarh
- Established: 1977
- Total electors: 276,158
- Reservation: None

Member of Legislative Assembly
- 16th Rajasthan Legislative Assembly
- Incumbent Udai Lal Anjana
- Party: Indian National Congress

Nimbahera Assembly constituency is one of the 200 Legislative Assembly constituencies of Rajasthan state in India.

It comprises Nimbahera tehsil and Chhoti Sadri tehsil, both in Chittorgarh district.

== Members of the Legislative Assembly ==
| Election | Member | Party |
|---|---|---|
| 2008 | Udai Lal Anjana | Indian National Congress |
| 2013 | Shrichand Kripani | Bharatiya Janata Party |
| 2018 | Udai Lal Anjana | Indian National Congress |
| 2023 | Shrichand Kriplani | Bharatiya Janata Party |

== Election results ==
=== 2023 ===
2023 Rajasthan Legislative Assembly election: Nimbahera
| Party | Candidate | Votes | % | ±% |
|---|---|---|---|---|
| BJP | Shrichand Kriplani | 116,640 | 49.1 | +4.31 |
| INC | Anjana Udayalal | 112,795 | 47.48 | −2.74 |
| NOTA | None of the above | 2,485 | 1.05 | −0.64 |
| Majority | | 3,845 | 1.62 | −3.81 |
| Turnout | | 237,550 | 86.02 | +0.25 |
| BJP gain from INC | | Swing | | |

=== 2018 ===
Rajasthan Legislative Assembly Election, 2018: Nimbahera
| Party | Candidate | Votes | % | ±% |
|---|---|---|---|---|
| INC | Udai Lal Anjana | 110,037 | 50.22 | |
| BJP | Shrichand Kriplani | 98,129 | 44.79 | |
| Independent | Shakir Miyan | 2,635 | 1.2 | |
| NOTA | None of the above | 3,701 | 1.69 | |
| Majority | | 11,908 | 5.43 | |
| Turnout | | 219,109 | 85.77 | |
| INC gain from BJP | | Swing | | |

== See also ==
- List of constituencies of the Rajasthan Legislative Assembly
- Chittorgarh district
