= Khemli =

- Village
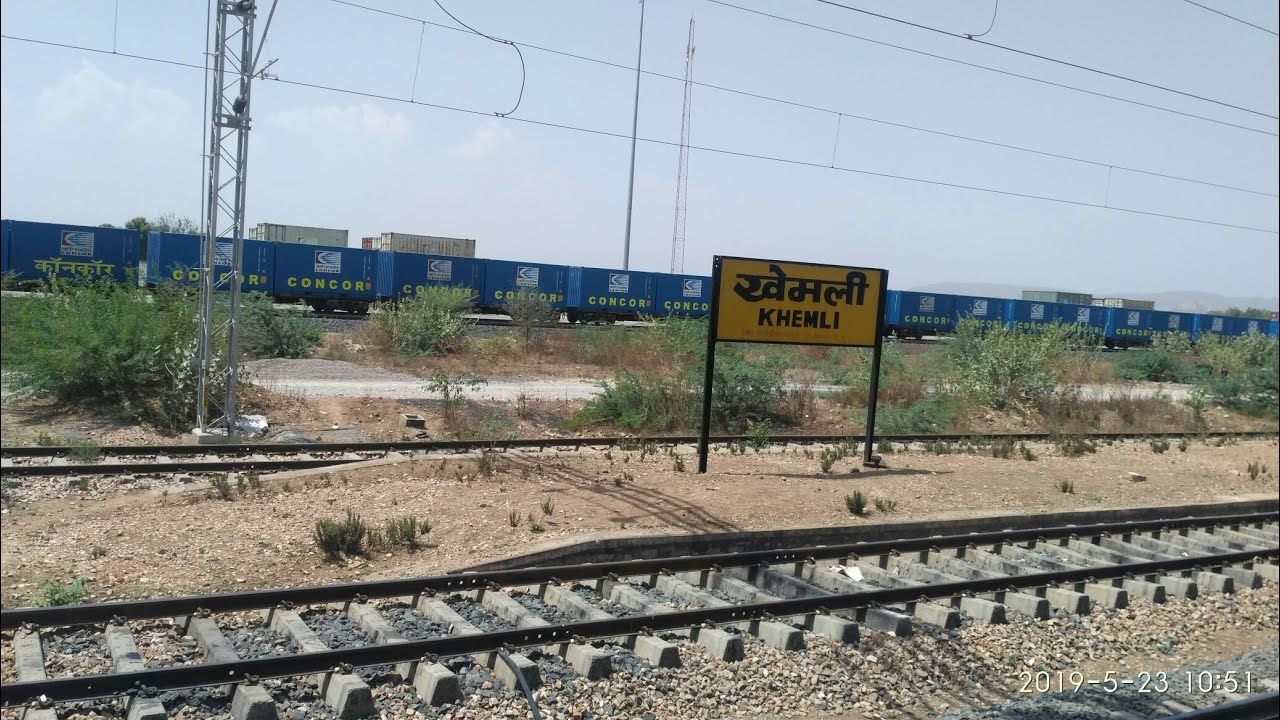

- Location in Rajasthan, India Khemli (India)
- Coordinates: 24.6759°N 73.8488°E
- Country: India
- State: Rajasthan
- District: Udaipur

Population (2011)
  - Total: 2,446

Languages
  - Official: Hindi, Mewari
- Time zone: UTC+5:30 (IST)
- PIN: 313201
- Vehicle registration: RJ-
- Nearest city: Udaipur
- Lok Sabha constituency: Udaipur

Khemli is a village in Mavli Tehsil in Udaipur district in the Indian state of Rajasthan. It is administrated by Sarpanch who is elected representative of village.

The total population of this village is 2446 in which 1229 are female and 1217 are male. Literacy rate is 61.04% in which male is 72.34% and female is 49.63%.
