= Phagliya =

Phagliya फागलिया Fagliya
- Panchayat Samiti
- Country: India
- State: Rajasthan
- District: Barmer
- Tehsil: Sedwa

Area
  - Total: 3,689.8 ha (9,118 acres)

Population
  - Total: 3,318

Languages
- Time zone: UTC+5:30 (IST)
- PIN: 344706
- ISO 3166 code: RJ-IN

Phagliya (also spelled Fagliya) is a gram panchayat and Panchayat Samiti in the Barmer district of Rajasthan, India. In terms of political representation, Phagliya falls under the Chohtan Assembly constituency and the Barmer Lok Sabha constituency.

According to the 2011 census, the total population of Phagliya was 3,318—comprising 1,731 males and 1,587 females—residing in 641 households.
