= Mavli Assembly constituency =

Legislative Assembly constituency in Rajasthan State, India

Coordinates: 24.79°N 73.98°E

Mavli
- Constituency No. 154 for the Rajasthan Legislative Assembly

Constituency details
- Country: India
- Region: North India
- State: Rajasthan
- District: Udaipur
- Lok Sabha constituency: Chittorgarh
- Established: 1957
- Total electors: 258,065
- Reservation: None

Member of Legislative Assembly
- 16th Rajasthan Legislative Assembly
- Incumbent Pushkar Lal Dangi
- Party: Indian National Congress
- Elected year: 2023

Mavli Assembly constituency is one of the 200 Legislative Assembly constituencies of Rajasthan state in India.

It is part of Udaipur district. As of 2023, its representative is Pushkar Lal Dangi of the Indian National Congress.

== Members of the Legislative Assembly ==
Year	Member	Party
2003	Shanti Lal Chaplot	Bharatiya Janata Party
2008	Pushkar Lal	Indian National Congress
2013	Dali Chand Dangi	Bharatiya Janata Party
2018	Dharmnarayan Joshi	Bharatiya Janata Party
2023	Pushkar Lal Dangi	Indian National Congress

== Election results ==
=== 2023 ===
2023 Rajasthan Legislative Assembly election: Mavli
Party	Candidate	Votes	%	±%
INC	Pushkar Lal Dangi	77,696	38.19	−0.92
BJP	Krishnagopal Paliwal	76,129	37.42	−16.19
RLP	Kuldeep Singh Chundawat	32,521	15.98	
BAP	Angur Lal Bheel	7,873	3.87	
Independent	Raju Puri	2,126	1.04	
NOTA	None of the above	2,441	1.2	−0.37
Majority		1,567	0.77	−13.73
Turnout		203,460	78.84	−0.46
INC gain from BJP		Swing		

=== 2018 ===
Rajasthan Legislative Assembly Election, 2018: Mavli
Party	Candidate	Votes	%	±%
BJP	Dharmnarayan Joshi	99,723	53.61	
INC	Pushkar Lal Dangi	72,745	39.11	
CPI	Jeevraj	2,167	1.17	
BSP	Chunnilal	2,086	1.12	
Rajasthan Janta Party	Tulsiram Bhil	1,843	0.99	
Bharat Vahini Party	Vijay Sharma	1,750	0.94	
NOTA	None of the above	2,919	1.57	
Majority		26,978	14.5	
Turnout		186,006	79.3	

== See also ==
- List of constituencies of the Rajasthan Legislative Assembly
- Udaipur district
