= Chittorgarh Lok Sabha constituency =

Lok Sabha constituency in Rajasthan, India

Coordinates: 24.9°N 74.6°E

Chittorgarh
- Lok Sabha constituency

Constituency details
- Country: India
- Region: North India
- State: Rajasthan
- Assembly constituencies: Mavli; Vallabhnagar; Kapasan; Begun; Chittorgarh; Nimbahera; Bari Sadri; Pratapgarh
- Established: 1952
- Reservation: None

Member of Parliament
- 18th Lok Sabha
- Incumbent Chandra Prakash Joshi
- Party: Bharatiya Janata Party
- Elected year: 2024

Chittorgarh Lok Sabha constituency (Hindi pronunciation: [t͡ʃɪt̪ːɔːɽ.gəɽʱ]) is one of the 25 Lok Sabha (Parliamentary) constituencies in Rajasthan state in India.

== Assembly segments ==
Presently, Chittorgarh Lok Sabha constituency comprises eight Vidhan Sabha (legislative assembly) segments. These are:

#	Name	District	Member	Party	2024 Lead
154	Mavli	Udaipur	Pushkar Lal Dangi	INC	BJP
155	Vallabhnagar	Udaipur	Udailal Dangi	BJP	BJP
167	Kapasan (SC)	Chittorgarh	Arjun Lal Jingar	BJP	BJP
168	Begun	Chittorgarh	Suresh Dhakar	BJP	BJP
169	Chittorgarh	Chittorgarh	Chandrabhan Aakya	IND	BJP
170	Nimbahera	Chittorgarh	Shrichand Kriplani	BJP	BJP
171	Bari Sadri	Chittorgarh	Gautam Kumar	BJP	BJP
172	Pratapgarh (ST)	Chittorgarh	Hemant Meena	BJP	BJP

== Members of Parliament ==
Year	Member	Party
1952	Umashankar Trivedi	Bharatiya Jana Sangh
1957	Manikya Lal Verma	Indian National Congress
1962	Manikya Lal Verma	Indian National Congress
1967	Onkar Lal Bohra	Indian National Congress
1971	Bishwanath Jhunjhunwala	Bharatiya Jana Sangh
1977	Shyam Sunder Somani	Janata Party
1980	Nirmla Kumari Shaktawat	Indian National Congress
1984	Nirmla Kumari Shaktawat	Indian National Congress
1989	Mahendra Singh Mewar	Bharatiya Janata Party
1991	Jaswant Singh	Bharatiya Janata Party
1996	Jaswant Singh	Bharatiya Janata Party
1998	Udai Lal Anjana	Indian National Congress
1999	Shrichand Kriplani	Bharatiya Janata Party
2004	Shrichand Kriplani	Bharatiya Janata Party
2009	Girija Vyas	Indian National Congress
2014	Chandra Prakash Joshi	Bharatiya Janata Party
2019	Chandra Prakash Joshi	Bharatiya Janata Party
2024	Chandra Prakash Joshi	Bharatiya Janata Party

== Election results ==
=== 2024 ===
2024 Indian general election: Chittorgarh
Party	Candidate	Votes	%	±%
BJP	Chandra Prakash Joshi	888,202	59.26	−8.12
INC	Udailal Anjana	4,98,325	33.5	+5.7
NOTA	None of the above	5,590		
Majority		3,89,877		
Turnout		14,98,733		
BJP hold		Swing		

=== 2019 ===
2019 Indian general elections: Chittorgarh
Party	Candidate	Votes	%	±%
BJP	Chandra Prakash Joshi	982,942	67.38	+7.43
INC	Gopal Singh Shekhawat	4,06,695	27.88	−5.06
NOTA	None of the Above	17,528	1.20	
BSP	Dr. Jagdish Chandra Sharma	13,484	0.92	N/A
CPI	Comrade Radha Bhandari	9,924	0.68	−1.16
RRP	Gopal Dhakad	2793	0.19	N/A
Margin of victory		5,76,247	39.50	+12.49
Turnout		14,59,266	72.39	
BJP hold		Swing		

=== 2014 ===
2014 Indian general elections: Chittorgarh
Party	Candidate	Votes	%	±%
BJP	Chandra Prakash Joshi	7,03,236	59.95	
INC	Girija Vyas	3,86,379	32.94	
CPI	Radha Devi	21,593	1.84	
NOTA	None of the Above	20,034	1.71	
IND.	Yaswant Puri	12,675	1.08	
Majority		3,16,857	27.01	
Turnout		11,72,629	64.45	
BJP gain from INC		Swing		

=== 2009 ===
2009 Indian general elections: Chittorgarh
Party	Candidate	Votes	%	±%
INC	Girija Vyas	3,99,663	50.25	
BJP	Shrichand Kriplani	3,26,885	41.10	
CPI	Radha Devi	19,594	2.46	
IND.	Sitaram Gujar	14,425	1.81	
Majority		72,778	9.16	
Turnout		7,94,881	49.64	
INC gain from BJP		Swing		

=== 2004 ===
2004 Indian general elections: Chittorgarh
Party	Candidate	Votes	%	±%
BJP	Shrichand Kriplani	3,75,385	55.82	+4.98
INC	Vishwa Vijay Singh	2,39,615	35.63	−10.59
CPI	Radha Devi	32,114	4.78	+2.49
BSP	S S Stone	12,798	1.90	
ABCD	Chand Mal Meghwal	12,565	1.87	
Majority		1,35,770	20.19	+15.67
Turnout		6,72,447	48.54	−17.17
BJP hold		Swing	+4.98	

== See also ==
- Chittorgarh district
- List of constituencies of the Lok Sabha
