= Harpaliya =

Village in Rajasthan, India

Coordinates: 25°01′02″N 71°03′06″E

- Village
- Interactive map of Harpaliya
- Country: India
- State: Rajasthan
- District: Barmer
- Tehsil: Sedwa

Area
  - Total: 3,240.39 ha (8,007.2 acres)

Population (2011)
  - Total: 3,838
- Time zone: UTC+5:30 (IST)
- PIN: 344706
- ISO 3166 code: RJ-IN
- Vehicle registration: RJ-04

Harpaliya is a village in Chohtan Tehsil of Barmer district in Rajasthan, India. Harpaliya has a total population of 3,838 of which 1950 are males and 1888 are females, according to Census 2011. The estimated population is about 4600. Harpaliya 120 km away from district headquarter Barmer, Rajasthan. Harpaleshwar Mahadev Temple is a local temple where an annual fair is held.
