= Ratanada =

Ratanada (Hindi:रातानाडा) (often spelled unofficially as 'Ratnada') is a well-known central locality as well as residential area in Jodhpur city of State of Rajasthan in India. It is primarily known as “Ratanada” because of the historic Ratanada Palace located there. It is an area situated in the Jodhpur Vidhan Sabha Constituency and Jodhpur Lok Sabha Constituency. The current MLA from Jodhpur city constituency is Atul Bhansali (BJP), whereas the Member of Parliament is Gajendra Singh Shekhawat from BJP.

== History ==
Ratanada is known by this name today because of the iconic Ratanada Palace built there by Maharaja Jaswant Singh II in the 1890s. The locality took its identity from this grand royal structure and the area around it. The construction of this grand palace began in 1891–92, and the third floor was completed around 1896–97. It was designed and supervised by architect W. Holmes. The palace was part of a larger plan to develop the area as a new or expanded state capital zone, with extensive grounds including a racecourse and other facilities. It later hosted important events.

After the much grander Umaid Bhawan Palace was built, Ratanada Palace lost its prominence. Post-independence, it was taken over by the government and now houses a Defence Research and Development Organisation (DRDO) laboratory.

== Administration ==
- Vidhansabha Constituency (Rajasthan State Legislative Assembly) = Jodhpur City (जोधपुर शहर)
- Lok Sabha Constituency = Jodhpur
- Police Station = Ratanada, comes under the police district jurisdiction of Deputy Commissioner of Police (DCP) - Jodhpur (East) under the Jodhpur Police Commissionerate area.

== Famous Places ==
- Ratanada Ganesh Temple
- Ratan Vilas, Heritage Hotel
- Ratanada Palace
- Central Jail, Jodhpur
- Shree Krishna Mandir
- Shree Siddh Nageshwar Mahadev Mandir (Shiv Temple)
- Various Heritage & Boutique Hotels
- High Court Colony - Upscale residential colony

The biggest advantage of the area is its location. The area is centrally located with excellent connectivity - domestic airport, railway station and central bus stand. One can easily reach Mehrangarh Fort, Umaid Bhawan Palace, and Jaswant Thada within 10–15 minutes by road.

== Famous People ==
- Ashwini Vaishnaw - Minister of Railways, Minister of Information and Broadcasting and Minister of Electronics and Information Technology in Government of India. (since 2024)
- Lt. Gen. Hanut Singh Jasol, Param Vir Chakra awardee. - Originally from Jasol, Balotra district.
