= Begun Assembly constituency =

Legislative Assembly constituency in Rajasthan State, India

Coordinates: 24.99°N 75.01°E

Begun
- Constituency No. 168 for the Rajasthan Legislative Assembly

Constituency details
- Country: India
- Region: North India
- State: Rajasthan
- Division: Rawatbhata, Begun
- District: Chittorgarh
- Lok Sabha constituency: Chittorgarh
- Established: 1972
- Total electors: 279,580
- Reservation: None

Member of Legislative Assembly
- 16th Rajasthan Legislative Assembly
- Incumbent Suresh Dhaker
- Party: Bharatiya Janata Party
- Elected year: 2023

Begun Assembly constituency is one of the 200 Legislative Assembly constituencies of Rajasthan state in India.

It is part of Chittorgarh district. As of 2023, it is represented by Suresh Dhaker of the Bharatiya Janata Party.

== Members of the Legislative Assembly ==
Election	Name	Party
1998	Ghanshyam	Indian National Congress
2003	Chunni Lal Dhakad	Bharatiya Janata Party
2008	Bidhuri Rajendra Singh	Indian National Congress
2013	Suresh Dhaker	Bharatiya Janata Party
2018	Bidhuri Rajendra Singh	Indian National Congress
2023	Dr. Suresh Dhakar	Bharatiya Janata Party

== Election results ==
=== 2023 ===
2023 Rajasthan Legislative Assembly election: Begun
Party	Candidate	Votes	%	±%
BJP	Suresh Dhakar	136,714	58.01	+13.02
INC	Gurjar Rajender Singh Bidhuri	86,053	36.51	−9.24
RLP	Naresh Kumar Gurjar	4,299	1.82	
BSP	Onkar	2,297	0.97	+0.03
NOTA	None of the above	2,103	0.89	−0.57
Majority		50,661	21.5	+20.74
Turnout		235,691	84.3	+0.43
BJP gain from INC		Swing		

=== 2018 ===
Rajasthan Legislative Assembly Election, 2018: Begun
Party	Candidate	Votes	%	±%
INC	Bidhuri Rajendra Singh	99,259	45.75	
BJP	Dr. Suresh Dhaker	97,598	44.99	
Independent	Gopallal Bhil	10,919	5.03	
BSP	Rameshvar Lal Bairva	2,050	0.94	
NOTA	None of the above	3,165	1.46	
Majority		1,661	0.76	
Turnout		216,944	83.87	

== See also ==
- List of constituencies of the Rajasthan Legislative Assembly
- Chittorgarh district
