= Ogala, Barmer =

Village in Barmer District, Rajasthan, India

Coordinates: 24°58′20″N 71°21′30″E

Ogala
- Village, Gram Panchayat
- Interactive map of Ogala
- Country: India
- State: Rajasthan
- District: Barmer
- Tehsil: Sedwa

Area
  - Total: 1,880.73 ha (4,647.4 acres)

Population (2011)
  - Total: 2,221
- Time zone: UTC+5:30 (IST)
- PIN: 344704
- ISO 3166 code: RJ-IN
- Vehicle registration: RJ-04

Ogala is a village and gram panchayat located in Sedwa tehsil of Barmer district, Rajasthan, India.

== Demographics ==
According to Census 2011 information the population of this village is 2221, out of which the male population is 1168 while the female population is 1053.
