= Mahant Pratap Puri =

Indian politician and spiritual leader (born 1970)

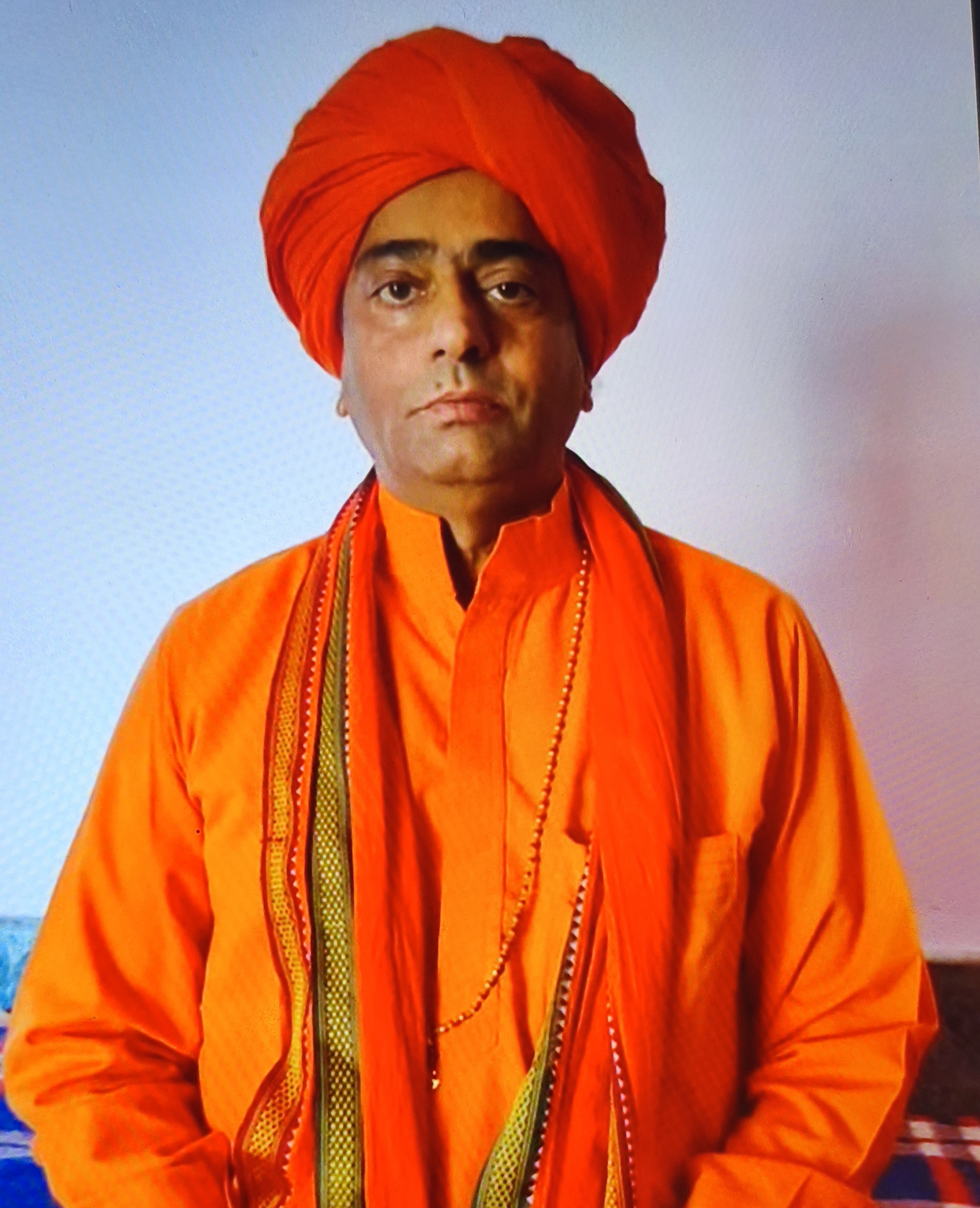

Member of the Rajasthan Legislative Assembly
- Incumbent
- Assumed office 3 December 2023
- Preceded by: Saleh Mohammad
- Constituency: Pokaran

Personal details
- Born: 5 August 1970 (age 55) Mahaabaar village, Rajasthan, India
- Party: Bharatiya Janata Party
- Occupation: Spiritual guru, politician

Mahant Pratap Puri (born 5 August 1970) is an Indian spiritual leader and politician. He is a member of the Rajasthan Legislative Assembly representing the Pokaran Assembly constituency. He is a member of the Bharatiya Janata Party and the current head of Taratara Math. He is a resident of Mahaabaar village in Barmer district in western Rajasthan, India. He is very active on social media.

== Early life and education ==
He completed his initial education in Leelsar village and Barmer, Rajasthan. He took his major education in Sastra section from the Gurukul in cheshire district in Haryana. He was handed over to his guru Mohan Puri Ji at very early age by his parents. He completed his studies and devoted himself in meditation and working for the sanatana Hindu dharma. His speeches highlight the need for social unity, women empowerment and scientific mindset on social media.

== Politics ==
He contested the Rajasthan Assembly election 2018 from Pokhran on Bharatiya Janata Party's ticket. He got defeated by a narrow margin of votes to Congress Politician Saleh Mohammad . He is actively involved in the areas of spiritual preaching and politics as well. He contested the Rajasthan Assembly election 2023 from Pokaran Assembly constituency on a Bharatiya Janata Party's ticket and won.
