= Suryakanta Vyas =

Indian politician (1938–2024)

Member of Rajasthan Legislative Assembly
- In office 2008–2023
- Preceded by: Mohan Meghwal
- Succeeded by: Devendra Joshi
- Constituency: Soorsagar
- In office 2003–2008
- Preceded by: Jugal Kabra
- Succeeded by: Kailash Bhanushali
- Constituency: Jodhpur
- In office 1990–1998
- Preceded by: Birad Mal
- Succeeded by: Jugal Kabra
- Constituency: Jodhpur

Personal details
- Born: 23 February 1938 Jodhpur, Jodhpur State, India (now in Rajasthan, India)
- Died: 25 September 2024 (aged 86) Jodhpur, Rajasthan, India
- Party: Bharatiya Janata Party
- Occupation: Social Worker

Suryakanta Vyas (23 February 1938 – 25 September 2024), affectionately known as Jiji, was an Indian politician and a figure in the Pushkarna Brahmin community in Rajasthan. She served six terms in the Rajasthan Legislative Assembly, contesting three times from the Jodhpur constituency before moving to the Soorsagar constituency in 2008.

== Political career ==
Vyas served six terms as a member of the Rajasthan Legislative Assembly. In her first three terms, she was elected from the Jodhpur constituency in 1990, 1993, and 1998. She later contested and won from the Soorsagar constituency in the 2008, 2013, and 2018 Rajasthan Assembly elections.

== Death ==
Vyas died on 25 September 2024, at the age of 86.

== Awards and honours ==
Vyas was honored multiple times for her contributions to the development of society. She was one of the most popular figures in the Jodhpur constituency and the Rajasthan Assembly. Known for her oratory skills, she was also recognised as the Best MLA in the Assembly for the year 2012.
