= Bhinmal Assembly constituency =

Legislative Assembly constituency in Rajasthan State, India

Coordinates: 25°N 72.27°E

Bhinmal
- Constituency No. 143 for the Rajasthan Legislative Assembly

Constituency details
- Country: India
- Region: North India
- State: Rajasthan
- District: Jalore
- Lok Sabha constituency: Jalore
- Established: 1972
- Total electors: 308,859
- Reservation: None

Member of Legislative Assembly
- 16th Rajasthan Legislative Assembly
- Incumbent Samarjit Singh
- Party: Indian National Congress
- Elected year: 2023

Bhinmal Assembly constituency is one of the 200 Legislative Assembly constituencies of Rajasthan state in India. It is a part of Jalore Lok Sabha constituency, and comprises Bagora tehsil and parts of Bhinmal tehsil, both in Jalore district. As of 2023, it is represented by Samarjit Singh of the Indian National Congress.

== Members of the Legislative Assembly ==
Year	Member	Party
2003	Samarjit Singh	Indian National Congress
2008	Poora Ram Choudhary	Bharatiya Janata Party
2013	Poora Ram Choudhary	Bharatiya Janata Party
2018	Poora Ram Choudhary	Bharatiya Janata Party
2023	Samarjit Singh	Indian National Congress

== Election results ==
=== 2023 ===
2023 Rajasthan Legislative Assembly election: Bhinmal
Party	Candidate	Votes	%	±%
INC	Samarjit Singh	97,157	47.79	+9.93
BJP	Poora Ram	96,130	47.28	+4.14
Independent	Ramesh Kumar Bhandari	2,234	1.1	
Abhinav Rajasthan Party	Krishna Kumar Rajpurohit	2,100	1.03	
NOTA	None of the above	4,084	2.01	+0.1
Majority		1,027	0.51	−4.77
Turnout		203,320	65.83	−0.41
INC gain from BJP		Swing		

=== 2018 ===
2018 Rajasthan Legislative Assembly election: Bhinmal
Party	Candidate	Votes	%	±%
BJP	Poora Ram Choudhary	78,893	43.14	
INC	Samarjit Singh	69,247	37.86	
Independent	Ramesh	13,564	7.42	
BSP	Krishan Kumar	6,434	3.52	
AAP	Nanda Devi	5,535	3.03	
Independent	Rekharam	2,055	1.12	
NOTA	None of the above	3,492	1.91	
Majority		9,646	5.28	
Turnout		182,892	66.24	
BJP hold		Swing		

== See also ==
- List of constituencies of the Rajasthan Legislative Assembly
- Jalore district
