= Dilip Choudhary =

Indian politician (born 1962)

Member, Rajasthan Legislative Assembly
- In office 2008–2013
- Preceded by: Surendra Goyal
- Succeeded by: Surendra Goyal
- Constituency: Jaitaran, Rajasthan

Parliamentary Secretary Government of Rajasthan
- In office March 2009 - December 2013

Personal details
- Born: 1 January 1962 (age 64) Jaitaran, Rajasthan, India
- Party: Rashtriya Loktantrik Party
- Other political affiliations: Indian National Congress
- Education: Bachelor of Arts, and Bachelor of Education
- Alma mater: Maharshi Dayanand Saraswati University
- Occupation: Politician

Dilip Choudhary (born 1 January 1962) is an Indian politician. He was elected to the Rajasthan Legislative Assembly from Jaitaran in 2008. He served as parliamentary secretary in the Government of Rajasthan, from March 2009, to December 2013. He served as a member of the Committee on Welfare of Other Backward Classes in the Rajasthan Legislative Assembly. Earlier, he was a member of the Subordinate Legislation Committee and also served on the Library Committee of the Assembly. He is a Member of the Rashtriya Loktantrik Party (RLP).

== Early life and education ==
Choudhary was born on 1 January 1962, in Jaitaran, Pali district, in the Indian state of Rajasthan. He did Bachelor of Arts (B.A.), and Bachelor of Education (B.Ed.) from Maharshi Dayanand Saraswati University in Ajmer.

== Political career ==
Choudhary won the 2008 Rajasthan Legislative Assembly election as an independent candidate by defeated the Bharatiya Janata Party candidate Surendra Goyal. He served as parliamentary secretary in the Government of Rajasthan, from March 2009, to December 2013. He served as a member of the Committee on Welfare of Other Backward Classes in the Rajasthan Legislative Assembly. Earlier, he was a member of the Subordinate Legislation Committee and also served on the Library Committee of the Assembly.

On 29 October 2025, Choudhary joined the Rashtriya Loktantrik Party (RLP), on the eve of party seventh foundation day in Bikaner, Rajasthan.
