= Devendra Joshi =

Indian politician

- देवेंद्र जोशी

Member of 16th Rajasthan Assembly since 2023
- Incumbent
- Assumed office 2023
- Preceded by: Suryakanta Vyas
- Constituency: Soorsagar

Personal details
- Party: Bhartiya Janta Party
- Occupation: Politician

Devendra Joshi is an Indian politician currently serving as a member of the 16th Rajasthan Legislative Assembly, representing the Soorsagar as a member of the Bhartiya Janta Party.

Following the 2023 Rajasthan Legislative Assembly election, he was elected as an MLA from the Soorsagar Assembly constituency, defeating Shahzad Aiyub Khan, the candidate from the Indian National Congress (INC), by 38,759 votes.
