= Saleh Mohammad (Indian politician) =

Indian politician (born 1977)

Shale Mohammad
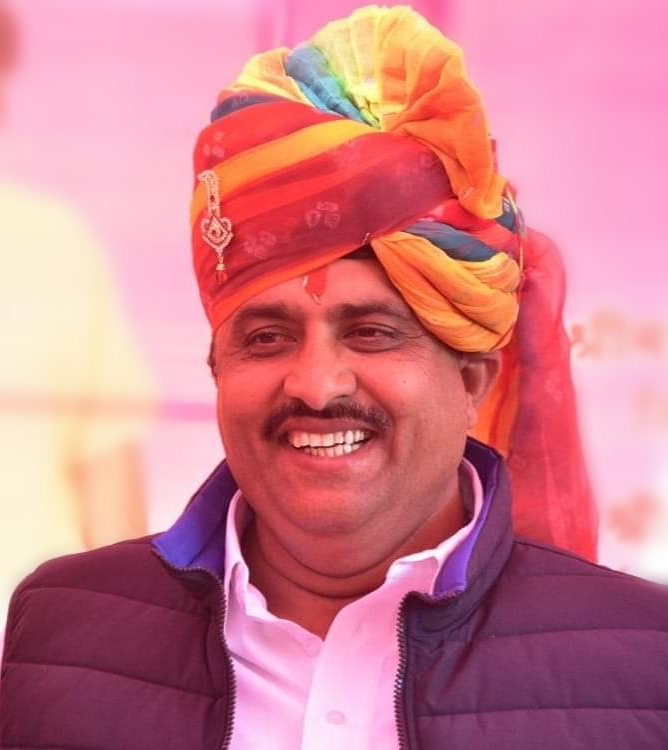
- Shale Mohammad

Cabinet Minister of Minority Affairs Waqf Colonization Department Government of Rajasthan
- In office 22 November 2021 – 3 December 2023

Minister of State of Public Grievance Redressal Department Government of Rajasthan
- In office 26 December 2018 – 22 November 2021

Member of the Rajasthan Legislative Assembly
- In office 2018–2023
- Succeeded by: Mahant Pratap Puri
- In office 2008–2013
- Constituency: Pokaran Assembly constituency

Personal details
- Born: Mohammad Saleh; 1 February 1977 (age 49) Jaisalmer
- Party: Indian National Congress
- Children: One daughter
- Occupation: Politician
- Profession: Agriculturist
- Cabinet: Third Ashok Gehlot ministry

Shale Mohammad (born 1 February 1977) is an Indian politician formerly serving as the Cabinet Minister of Minority Affairs Waqf Colonization Department Government of Rajasthan & served Member of the Rajasthan Legislative Assembly from Pokaran Assembly constituency. He is a Politician from the Indian National Congress.

== Personal life ==
Mohammad's father is Gazi Fakir, who is a Muslim religious leader. Fakir is influential amongst the Sindhi Muslims.

== Political career ==
=== Early career ===
In 2000, Mohammad became the head of Jaisalmer Panchayat samiti at the age of 23.

In 2013 Rajasthan Legislative Assembly election, Mohammad was defeated by Bharatiya Janata Party candidate Shaitan Singh by a margin of approximately 35,000 votes. In 2008 Rajasthan Legislative Assembly election, he won from the newly created Pokhran assembly constituency by a margin of 339 votes. However, he lost to Shaitan Singh in the next election.

=== Cabinet minister ===
In 2018 Rajasthan Legislative Assembly election, Mohammad was pitted against Bharatiya Janata Party candidate Mahant Pratap Puri. Pratap Puri is a Hindu saint and is the mahant (chief priest) of Taratara sect. According to political observers, by fielding the mahant against Mohammad, the party was trying to fight anti-incumbency by polarising the Hindu voters. Mohammad defeated Pratap Puri by a margin of 872 votes.

Subsequently, Mohammad was made a cabinet minister in the third Gehlot ministry and became the first ever politician from Jaisalmer district to get a ministry. He took charge over the ministry of Minority affairs, and took oath on 25 December 2018.

== Controversy ==
In August 2013, an FIR was lodged against Mohammad for allegedly issuing threats to IPS officer Pankaj Choudhary following an argument at a petrol pump.
