= Kailash Bhansali =

Indian politician (1942–2023)

Kailash Bhanshali
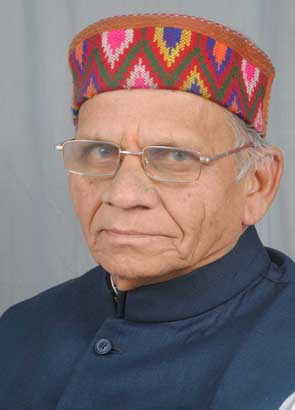

Personal details
- Born: 18 February 1941; Jodhpur, Kingdom of Marwar, India
- Died: 16 November 2023 (aged 82); Jodhpur, Rajasthan, India
- Political party: Bharatiya Janata Party
- Spouse: Maya Bhansali
- Occupation: C.A.

Kailash Bhansali (18 February 1941 – 16 November 2023) was an Indian politician who served as a member of the Rajasthan Legislative Assembly from the Jodhpur constituency in Rajasthan from 2008 to 2014 and again from 2015 to 2018.

== Political career ==
Kailash Bhansali started his political journey from his college days. He became an active member of Rashtriya Swayamsevak Sangh in 1958. He was part of the State Executive of Akhil Bhartiya Vidyarthi Parishad. He became secretary of the Student Union of SMK College Jodhpur in 1961. In 1964, he became General Secretary of the Student Union of Jodhpur University. Throughout 1977–78, he was District Secretary of Janata Party Jodhpur. In 2005, he became the treasurer of the State Unit of Rajasthan BJP. He has been involved in all of the Public Elections in Jodhpur since 1960. In 2008 Rajasthan State Assembly Election, he defeated Shri Jugal Kabra of Indian National Congress by over 8,500 votes.

In 2013 Rajasthan Assembly elections, he defeated Shri Suparas Bhandari of Indian National Congress by over 14,500 votes.

== Death ==
Bhansali died due to lung disease on 16 November 2023, at MDM hospital at the age of 82.
