= Atul Bhansali =

Indian politician

Atul Bhansali (born 20 October 1970) is an Indian politician from Rajasthan. He is a member of the Rajasthan Legislative Assembly from Jodhpur Assembly constituency in Jodhpur district. He won the 2023 Rajasthan Legislative Assembly election representing the Bharatiya Janata Party.

== Early life and education ==
Bhansali is from Jodhpur, Rajasthan. He is the son of Hanwant Chand Bhansali and Vimala Devi Bhansali. He married Nupur Bhansali. He completed his CA in 1995 at the Institute of Chartered Accountants of India. Earlier, he did BCom at a college affiliated with University of Jodhpur in 1990. He is a chartered accountant and runs his own firm where his wife is also a director.

== Career ==
Bhansali won from Jodhpur Assembly constituency representing the Bharatiya Janata Party in the 2023 Rajasthan Legislative Assembly election. He polled 71,192 votes and defeated his nearest rival and sitting MLA, Manisha Panwar of the Indian National Congress, by a margin of 13,525 votes. In the 2018 Rajasthan Legislative Assembly election, he lost to Panwar of the Congress by a margin of 5,849 votes.
