= Tarun Rai Kaga =

Indian politician

Member of the Rajasthan Legislative Assembly
- In office 2013 - 2018
- Preceded by: Padma Ram
- Constituency: Chohtan

Personal details
- Born: 1 January 1946 (age 80)
- Party: Bharatiya Janata Party

Tarun Rai Kaga is an Indian politician. He is a former Member of Legislative Assembly from Chohtan constituency Rajasthan, leader of the Bharatiya Janata Party.
