= Jodhpur Assembly constituency =

Constituency of the Rajasthan legislative assembly in India

Coordinates: 26.28°N 73.03°E

Jodhpur City
- Constituency No. 128 for the Rajasthan Legislative Assembly

Constituency details
- Country: India
- Region: North India
- State: Rajasthan
- District: Jodhpur district
- Established: 1951
- Reservation: None

Member of Legislative Assembly
- 16th Rajasthan Legislative Assembly
- Incumbent Atul Bhansali
- Party: Bhartiya Janta Party

Jodhpur City Assembly constituency is one of constituencies of Rajasthan Legislative Assembly in the Jodhpur Lok Sabha constituency.

== Members of the Legislative Assembly ==
Year	Member	Party
1952	Hanwant Singh	Independent
1952^	H. K. Vyas	Communist Party of India
1957	Barkatullah Khan	Indian National Congress
1962	Barkatullah Khan	Indian National Congress
1967	Barkatullah Khan	Indian National Congress
1972	Guman Mal Lodha	Bharatiya Jana Sangh
1977	Birad Mal Singhvi	Janata Party
1980	Ahmed Baksh Singh	Indian National Congress (I)
1985	Birad Mal Singhvi	Bharatiya Janata Party
1990	Suryakanta Vyas	Bharatiya Janata Party
1993	Suryakanta Vyas	Bharatiya Janata Party
1998	Jugal Kabra	Indian National Congress
2003	Suryakanta Vyas	Bharatiya Janata Party
2008	Kailash Bhansali	Bharatiya Janata Party
2013	Kailash Bhansali	Bharatiya Janata Party
2018	Manisha Panwar	Indian National Congress
2023	Atul Bhansali	Bharatiya Janata Party

== Election results ==
=== 2023 ===
2023 Rajasthan Legislative Assembly election: Jodhpur
Party	Candidate	Votes	%	±%
BJP	Atul Bhansali	71,192	53.93	+8.22
INC	Manisha Panwar	57,667	43.68	−6.62
NOTA	None of the above	844	0.64	−0.23
Majority		13,525	10.25	+5.66
Turnout		132,010	66.1	+1.67
BJP gain from INC		Swing		

=== 2018 ===
2018 Rajasthan Legislative Assembly election: Jodhpur
Party	Candidate	Votes	%	±%
INC	Manisha Panwar	64,172	50.3	
BJP	Atul Bhansali	58,323	45.71	
Independent	Ravindra Singh Ranawat	1,282	1.0	
NOTA	None of the above	1,107	0.87	
Majority		5,849	4.59	
Turnout		127,586	64.43	
INC gain from BJP		Swing		

== See also ==
- Member of the Legislative Assembly (India)
