= Rajendra Singh Bidhuri =

Indian politician

Former MLA
- In office December 2018 – December 2023
- Preceded by: Suresh Dhakar
- Succeeded by: Suresh Dhaker
- Constituency: Begun
- In office Dec 2008 – Nov 2013
- Succeeded by: Suresh Dhakar
- Constituency: Begun

Personal details
- Born: 14 May 1961 (age 65) New Delhi, India
- Party: Indian National Congress
- Education: Bachelors of Arts in Political Science Hons.
- Alma mater: Sri Aurobindo College

Rajendra Singh Bidhuri (born 14 May 1961) is a former Member of the Rajasthan Legislative Assembly and a member of the Indian National Congress (INC).

He was a Member of Legislative Assembly representing Begun (Vidhan Sabha constituency) 2018–2023. He also served as a Parliamentary secretary during 2008–2012 in the Rajasthan Legislative Assembly. He resigned from the parliamentary secretary post in 2012 to press the government to meet the Gurjar agitation demand for 5% quota in jobs and educational institutes.
