= Sangod Assembly constituency =

Legislative Assembly constituency in Rajasthan State, India

Coordinates: 24.93°N 76.29°E

Sangod
- Constituency No. 188 for the Rajasthan Legislative Assembly

Constituency details
- Country: India
- Region: North India
- State: Rajasthan
- District: Kota
- Lok Sabha constituency: Kota
- Assembly constituencies: Sangod
- Established: 2008
- Total electors: 206,732
- Reservation: None

Member of Legislative Assembly
- 16th Rajasthan Legislative Assembly
- Incumbent Heeralal Nagar
- Party: Bharatiya Janata Party
- Elected year: 2023
- Preceded by: Bharat Singh Kundanpur

Sangod Assembly constituency is one of the 200 Legislative Assembly constituencies of Rajasthan state in India. It comprises Sangod tehsil and parts of Digod tehsil, both in Kota district. As of 2023, its representative is Heeralal Nagar of the Bharatiya Janata Party.

== Members of the Legislative Assembly ==
Election	Name	Party
2008	Bharat Singh Kundanpur	Indian National Congress
2013	Heera Lal Nagar	Bharatiya Janta Party
2018	Bharat Singh Kundanpur	Indian National Congress
2023	Heera Lal Nagar	Bharatiya Janta Party

== Election results ==
=== 2023 ===
2023 Rajasthan Legislative Assembly election: Sangod
Party	Candidate	Votes	%	±%
BJP	Heeralal Nagar	93,435	55.78	+9.12
INC	Bhanu Pratap Singh	67,849	40.51	−7.36
BSP	Prabhu Lal	1,622	0.97	
ASP(KR)	Ramavtar Verma	1,531	0.91	
NOTA	None of the above	1,320	0.79	−0.21
Majority		25,586	15.27	+14.06
Turnout		167,505	79.79	+1.7
BJP gain from INC		Swing		

=== 2018 ===
Rajasthan Legislative Assembly Election, 2018: Sangod
Party	Candidate	Votes	%	±%
INC	Bharat Singh Kundanpur	74,154	47.87	
BJP	Heera Lal Nagar	72,286	46.66	
Independent	Suresh Kumar	2,774	1.79	
NOTA	None of the above	1,556	1.0	
Majority		1,868	1.21	
Turnout		154,906	78.09	
INC gain from BJP		Swing		

== See also ==
- List of constituencies of the Rajasthan Legislative Assembly
- Kota district
