= Dalichand Dangi =

Indian politician

Member of the Rajasthan Legislative Assembly
- Incumbent
- Assumed office 2013
- Constituency: Mavli

Personal details
- Born: Namri, Udaipur
- Party: Bharatiya Janata Party
- Occupation: Politician
- Profession: Agriculture

Dalichand Dangi is an Indian politician from the Bharatiya Janata Party and a member of the Rajasthan Legislative Assembly representing the Mavli Vidhan Sabha constituency of Rajasthan.
