= Samrath Lal Meena =

Indian politician (died 2014)

Speaker of Rajasthan Legislative Assembly
- In office 1998–1999
- Preceded by: Shanti Lal Chaplot
- Succeeded by: Parasram Maderna

Personal details
- Died: May 2014
- Party: Bharatiya Janata Party

Samrath Lal Meena (died May 2014) was an Indian Bharatiya Janata Party (BJP) politician in Rajasthan who served as Speaker of Rajasthan Legislative Assembly from 24 July 1998 to 4 January 1999.

Meena was five times MLA from Rajgarh in the Alwar district. He belonged to Village thekreen Rajgarh. Meena died in May 2014.
