= Bari Sadri Assembly constituency =

Legislative Assembly constituency in Rajasthan State, India

Coordinates: 24.42°N 74.47°E

Bari Sadri
- Constituency No. 171 for the Rajasthan Legislative Assembly

Constituency details
- Country: India
- Region: North India
- State: Rajasthan
- District: Chittorgarh
- Lok Sabha constituency: Chittorgarh
- Established: 2008
- Total electors: 274,987
- Reservation: None

Member of Legislative Assembly
- 16th Rajasthan Legislative Assembly
- Incumbent Gautam Kumar
- Party: Bharatiya Janata Party

Bari Sadri Assembly constituency is one of the 200 Legislative Assembly constituencies of Rajasthan state in India.

It comprise Bari Sadri tehsil, Dungla tehsil, and parts of Bhadesar tehsil, all in Chittorgarh district.

== Members of the Legislative Assembly ==
Election	Name	Party
2008	Prakash Chandra Chaudhary	Indian National Congress
2013	Gautam Kumar	Bharatiya Janata Party
2018	Lalit Kumar	Bharatiya Janata Party
2023	Gautam Kumar	Bharatiya Janata Party

== Election results ==
=== 2023 ===
2023 Rajasthan Legislative Assembly election: Bari Sadri
Party	Candidate	Votes	%	±%
BJP	Gautam Kumar	103,940	47.54	−0.64
INC	Badri Lal Jat	92,108	42.13	−1.67
BAP	Phoji Lal	11,833	5.41	
NOTA	None of the above	3,580	1.64	−0.13
Majority		11,832	5.41	+1.03
Turnout		218,644	79.51	−0.13
BJP hold		Swing		

=== 2018 ===
2018 Rajasthan Legislative Assembly election: Bari Sadri
Party	Candidate	Votes	%	±%
BJP	Lalit Kumar	97,111	48.18	
INC	Prakash Choudhary	88,301	43.8	
BSP	Chaman Pal Singh	3,704	1.84	
Independent	Mahendra Singh	2,951	1.46	
Independent	Vinod Kumar Bhoi	2,181	1.08	
Anjuman Party	Dilip Kumar Soni	1,901	0.94	
NOTA	None of the above	3,563	1.77	
Majority		8,810	4.38	
Turnout		201,578	79.64	

== See also ==
- List of constituencies of the Rajasthan Legislative Assembly
- Chittorgarh district
