= Padma Ram Meghwal =

Indian politician

Padma Ram

Member of the Rajasthan Legislative Assembly
- In office 2018 - 2023
- Preceded by: Tarun Rai Kaga
- Succeeded by: Aduram Meghwal
- Constituency: Chohtan
- In office 2008 - 2013
- Preceded by: Gangaram Choudhary
- Succeeded by: Tarun Rai Kaga
- Constituency: Chohtan

Pradhan, Sedwa, Barmer district
- In office 2015 - 2018

Personal details
- Born: 12 November 1963 (age 63) Fagliya, Sedwa, Barmer
- Party: Indian National Congress

Padma Ram Meghwal is an Indian politician. He was a Member of Legislative Assembly from Chohtan constituency Rajasthan, leader of the Indian National Congress.

== Political career ==
Padma Ram Meghwal is a member of the Indian National Congress, Congress MLA candidate Chohtan Assembly. He is the Indian National Congress Assembly Candidate of Chohtan Assembly Constituency in Rajasthan Election for some years. He lost the Rajasthan Assembly Election, 2023 to Adu Ram Meghwal (BJP).
