= Wonder Cement =

Indian cement production company

Wonder Cement Limited
- Company type: Private
- Industry: Building materials
- Founded: 2010
- Headquarters: Udaipur, Rajasthan, India
- Areas served: Haryana, Delhi, Uttar Pradesh, Uttarakhand, Punjab, Rajasthan, Madhya Pradesh, Gujarat Maharashtra
- Key people: Ashok Patni (Chairman); Vimal Patni (Vice Chairman); Suresh Patni (Managing Director)
- Products: Cement
- Revenue: ▲₹7,171 crore (US$750 million) (FY24)
- Operating income: ▲₹1,363 crore (US$140 million) (FY24)
- Net income: ▲₹430 crore (US$45 million) (FY24)
- Number of employees: 1,243 (2021)
- Parent: RK Group
- Website: www.wondercement.com

Wonder Cement is an Indian cement producing company that is based out of Rajasthan. It was started in 2010 under RK Group. It manufactures Portland pozzolana and ordinary Portland cement for plaster, brickwork, and other construction applications.

== History ==
In 2012, the company set up its first unit in Nimbahera, Rajasthan, with thirty lakh tonnes per annum. In 2015, Wonder Cement added another unit taking its annual cement production to 67.5 lakh tonnes.

In 2018, the company invested ₹450 crore to set up a 20 lakh (2 million) tonne per annum clinker grinding unit in Dhule, Maharashtra. In 2019, Wonder Cement invested ₹1,100 crore to build a third plant at Nimbahera in Rajasthan's Chittorgarh district, increasing its annual capacity of producing close to 1.1 crore (11 million) tonnes of cement. In 2020, Wonder Cement invested ₹800 crore to set up cement plants in Badnawar and Jhajjar which increased the annual capacity to 1.3 crore (13 million) tonnes of cement.

In 2023, Wonder Cement announced the setup of a new grinding unit at Tulsigram village in Gujarat, while the company's total production capacity reached 18 million tonne per annum. In 2024, Wonder Cement signed a sponsorship deal worth ₹250 crore (US$26 million) with the Indian Premier League.
