= Amrita Meghwal =

Indian politician

Member of the Rajasthan Legislative Assembly
- In office 2013 – 12 December 2018
- Preceded by: Ramlal meghwal
- Succeeded by: Jogeshwar Garg
- Constituency: Jalore

Personal details
- Born: 19 November 1986 (age 39) Chanod, Pali
- Party: Bharatiya Janata Party
- Parent(s): Mishri Lal Meghwal; Meera Meghwal
- Education: B.A. from Delhi University
- Alma mater: Delhi University

Amrita Meghwal (born 19 November 1986) is a former MLA of Jalore. Who won from the Jalore Constituency as a BJP nominee is the First youngest candidate. She defeated Congress's Ramlal with a margin of 46,800 votes.
