= Soorsagar Assembly constituency =

Political division of Rajasthan, India

Coordinates: 26.32°N 73.00°E

Soorsagar
- Constituency No. 129 for the Rajasthan Legislative Assembly

Constituency details
- Country: India
- Region: North India
- State: Rajasthan
- District: Jodhpur district
- Established: 1977
- Reservation: None

Member of Legislative Assembly
- 16th Rajasthan Legislative Assembly
- Incumbent Suryakanta Vyas
- Party: Bharatiya Janata Party
- Elected year: 2018

Soorsagar Assembly constituency is one of constituencies of Rajasthan Legislative Assembly in the Jodhpur Lok Sabha constituency.

== Members of the Legislative Assembly ==
Year	Member	Party
1977	Narpat Ram Barwad	Indian National Congress
1980	Narpat Ram Barwad	Indian National Congress
1985	Narpat Ram Barwad	Indian National Congress
1990	Mohan Meghwal	Bharatiya Janata Party
1993	Mohan Meghwal	Bharatiya Janata Party
1998	Bhanwar Lal Balai	Indian National Congress
2003	Mohan Meghwal	Bharatiya Janata Party
2008	Suryakanta Vyas	Bharatiya Janata Party
2013	Suryakanta Vyas	Bharatiya Janata Party
2018	Suryakanta Vyas	Bharatiya Janata Party
2023	Devendra Joshi	Bharatiya Janata Party

== Election results ==
=== 2023 ===
2023 Rajasthan Legislative Assembly election: Soorsagar
Party	Candidate	Votes	%	±%
BJP	Devendra Joshi	117,065	58.27	+9.35
INC	Er. Shahzad Aiyub Khan	78,306	38.98	−6.7
NOTA	None of the above	1,734	0.86	−0.43
Majority		38,759	19.29	+16.05
Turnout		200,909	69.6	+2.53
BJP hold		Swing		

=== 2018 ===
2018 Rajasthan Legislative Assembly election: Soorsagar
Party	Candidate	Votes	%	±%
BJP	Suryakanta Vyas	86,885	48.92	
INC	Professor Ayyub Khan	81,122	45.68	
BSP	Ghasiram Bhati	1,676	0.94	
NOTA	None of the above	2,294	1.29	
Majority		5,763	3.24	
Turnout		177,593	67.07	
BJP gain from		Swing		

== See also ==
- Member of the Legislative Assembly (India)
