= Rampal Meghwal =

Indian politician

Member of the Rajasthan Legislative Assembly
- In office 2013–2018
- Preceded by: Pana Chand Meghwal
- Succeeded by: Pana Chand Meghwal
- Constituency: Atru

12 December 2013 To 18 December 2018

Personal details
- Party: Bharatiya Janata Party
- Occupation: Politician

Rampal Meghwal is an Indian politician from the Bharatiya Janata Party and a former member of the Rajasthan Legislative Assembly representing the Atru Vidhan Sabha constituency of Rajasthan.
