= Nimbahera =

Nimbahera Nawabo ka nimbaheda
- Town
- Nickname: Cement City
- Location in Rajasthan, India Nimbahera (India)
- Coordinates: 24.62°N 74.68°E
- Country: India
- State: Rajasthan
- District: Chittorgarh

Government
  - MLA: Shrichand Kriplani (BJP)

Area
  - Total: 24 km^{2} (9.3 sq mi)
- Elevation: 437 m (1,434 ft)

Population (2013)
  - Total: 86,453
  - Density: 3,600/km^{2} (9,300/sq mi)

Languages
  - Official: Hindi
- Time zone: UTC+5:30 (IST)
- PIN: 312601, 312617 (Kailash Nagar)
- Telephone code: +91-1477
- Vehicle registration: RJ-09

Nimbahera is a town and a municipality in Chittorgarh district in the Indian state of Rajasthan. It is located around 32 km from Chittorgarh city, 350 km (220 mi) south-west of the state capital, Jaipur. Nimbahera is connected through both rail and road; it lies on the railway line connecting Ajmer to Ratlam.

Nimbaheda has significant population of Mewati community.

The Dusshera fair of Nimbahera is a 10-day fair which is organized during Navratras according to the Hindu calendar every year in Nimbahera. It is the second-largest fair of Rajasthan after Kota's. Many people come to this cultural fair, which is organized by the local municipality.

== Geography ==
Nimbahera is located at 24.62°N 74.68°E.

== Demographics ==
As of 2011 census, Nimbahera had a population of 78,123. In Nimbahera, 19% of the population is under 6 years of age.

== Economy ==
Nimbahera is known for Nimbahera stone, a kind of limestone used as a building material and raw material in cement manufacturing, thus making it a suitable destination for cement industries and a good source of employment. Nimbahera has four cement plants, JK Cement nimbahera & Mangrol, Wonder Cement, and Nuvoco cement. Wonder Cement set up its first plant with a capacity of 3 million tonnes per annum.
