= Aduram Meghwal =

Indian politician

Member of the Rajasthan Legislative Assembly
- Incumbent
- Assumed office 3 December 2023
- Preceded by: Padma Ram
- Constituency: Chohtan

Personal details
- Born: 3 December 1966 (age 59) Chohtan, Barmer, Rajasthan, India
- Party: Bharatiya Janata Party
- Spouse: Meera Devi
- Children: 2
- Occupation: Politician
- Profession: Agriculture
- Website: official website

Aduram Meghwal (3 December 1966) is an Indian Politician currently Serving as a 16th, Member of the Rajasthan Legislative Assembly from Chohtan in Barmer district. He is Member of the Bhartiya Janta Party.

== Career ==
Following the 2023 Rajasthan Legislative Assembly election, he was elected as an MLA from the Chohtan Assembly constituency, defeating Padmaram, the candidate from the Indian National Congress (INC), by a margin of 14,28 votes.
