= Manju Meghwal =

Indian politician

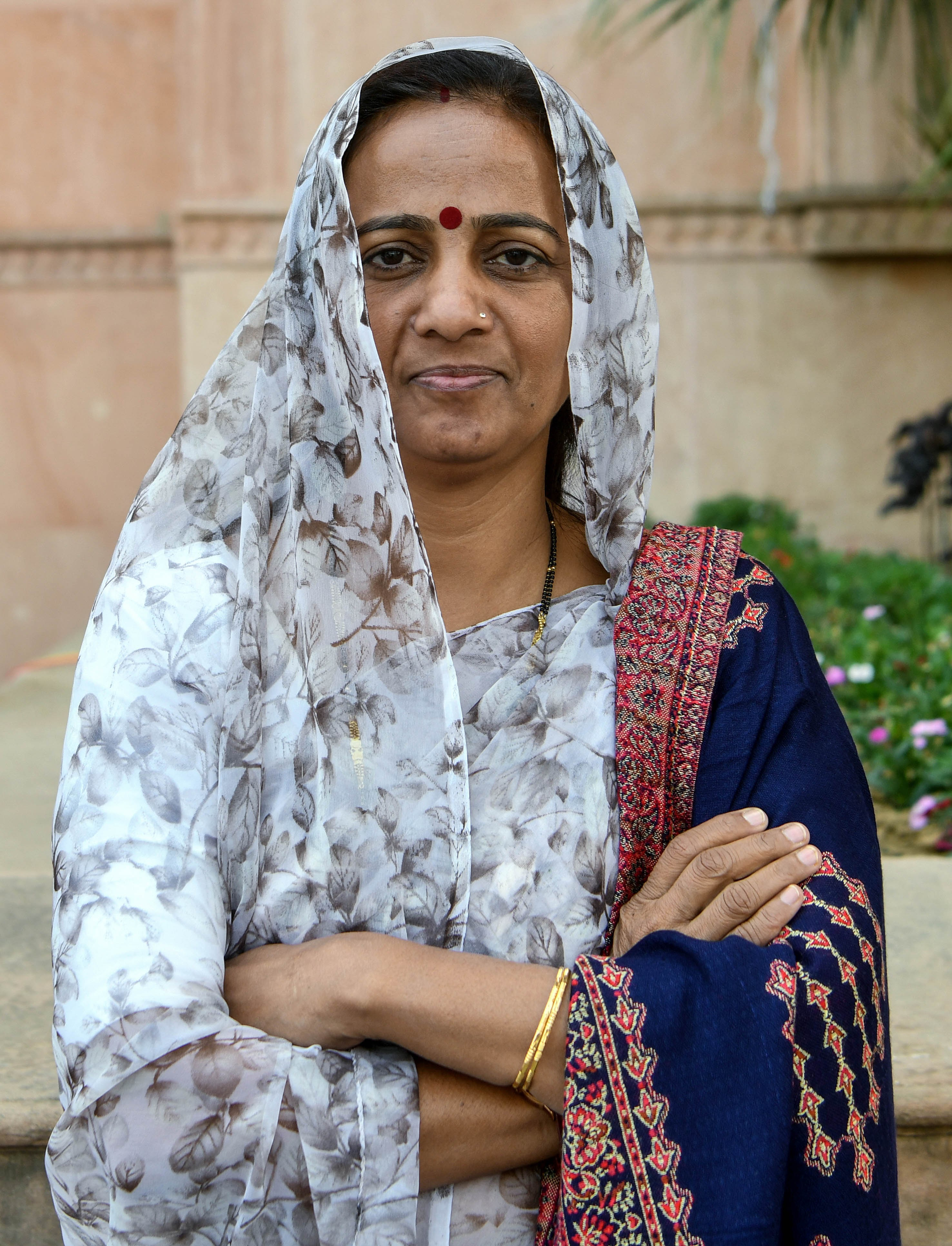
- Manju Meghwal

Member of the Rajasthan Legislative Assembly
- In office December 2018 – 3 Desember 2023
- Preceded by: Manju Baghmar
- Succeeded by: Manju Baghmar
- Constituency: Jayal
- In office 2008 - 2013
- Preceded by: Madan Lal Meghwal
- Succeeded by: Manju Baghmar
- Constituency: Jayal
- In office 2013 -2018
- Chief Minister: Ashok Gehlot
- Succeeded by: Anita Bhadel

Personal details
- Born: 20 April 1977 (age 49) Pushkar, Ajmer, Rajasthan
- Party: Indian National Congress
- Education: PhD
- Alma mater: Mahatma Jyoti Rao Phoole University
- Profession: Politician

Manju Meghwal is an Indian politician. She was elected to the Rajasthan Legislative Assembly from Jayal constituency of Nagaur. She is member of the Indian National Congress.

== Career ==
She received a PhD degree from Mahatma Jyoti Rao Phoole University. She prepared a research paper in the context of the role of people's representatives of Zila Parishad of Nagaur.

She was awarded the Best MLA Award for 2021 for her excellent work in the House and raising the maximum number of issues at the Rajasthan Legislative Assembly. She was honored by giving a letter of appreciation issued by then assembly Speaker C. P. Joshi, CM Ashok Gehlot, LoP Gulab Chand Kataria.
