= Udai Lal Anjana =

Senior Indian National Congress leader

Cabinet Minister Of Co-operative Government of Rajasthan
- In office 24 December 2018 – 3 December 2023
- Chief Minister: Ashok Gehlot
- Succeeded by: Bhajan Lal Sharma

Member of Rajasthan Legislative Assembly
- In office 2008–2013
- Succeeded by: Shrichand Kriplani
- Constituency: Nimbahera & Chhoti Sadri

Vice President of the Rajasthan Pradesh Congress Committee
- Incumbent
- Assumed office 24 February 2011
- National President: Rahul Gandhi (2017–2019); Sonia Gandhi (till 2017)
- State President: Sachin Pilot (2014–2020); C.P. Joshi (till 2014)

Member of the Indian Parliament for Chittorgarh
- In office 10 March 1998 – 26 April 1999
- Preceded by: Jaswant Singh
- Succeeded by: Shrichand Kriplani

Personal details
- Born: 5 May 1951 (age 75) Kesunda, Chhoti Sadri, Rajasthan
- Party: Indian National Congress
- Education: Govt. College, Neemuch
- Occupation: Businessman
- Profession: Politician
- Website: udailalanjana.com

Udai Lal Anjana (born 5 May 1951) is a senior Indian National Congress leader who formerly served as the Minister of Co-operation in the Rajasthan government and as the Vice President of the Rajasthan Pradesh Congress Committee. As a member of the Congress party, he has represented the Nimbahera assembly seat in Rajasthan thrice. He was previously a member of the Indian Parliament for the Chittorgarh constituency of Rajasthan, a feat that he achieved after defeating the then Union Defence Minister Jaswant Singh.

Apart from politics, he is a businessman; chairperson of UB Group; and a social worker. In 2010, he founded Harish Anjana Foundation, a non-profit organisation.

== Early life ==
Anjana was born on 5 May 1951 to a Rajasthani Hindu family of farmers in Kesunda village of Chittorgarh district, Rajasthan. He was the second of four children born to Late Shri Bheru Lal Anjana and Shrimati Gopi Bai Anjana. Anjana studied BCom at Neemuch in the state of Madhya Pradesh.
