= Jayal Assembly constituency =

Legislative Assembly constituency in Rajasthan State, India

Coordinates: 27.22°N 74.19°E

Jayal
- Constituency No. 108 for the Rajasthan Legislative Assembly

Constituency details
- Country: India
- Region: North India
- State: Rajasthan
- District: Nagaur
- Lok Sabha constituency: Nagaur
- Established: 1972
- Total electors: 262,399
- Reservation: SC

Member of Legislative Assembly
- 16th Rajasthan Legislative Assembly
- Incumbent Manju Baghmar
- Party: Bharatiya Janata Party

Jayal Assembly constituency is one of the 200 Legislative Assembly constituencies of Rajasthan state in India.

It is part of Nagaur district and is reserved for candidates belonging to the Scheduled Castes. As of 2023, it is represented by Manju Baghmar of the fo Bharatiya Janata Party.

== Members of the Legislative Assembly ==
Year	Name	Party
1967	Ram Singh Kuri	Independent politician
1972	Ram Singh Kuri	Independent politician
1977	Mangi Lal	Indian National Congress
1980	Ram Karan	Indian National Congress
1985	Mohan Lal Barupal	Lok Dal
1990	Mohan Lal Barupal	Janata Dal
1993	Mohan Lal Barupal	Indian National Congress
1998	Mohan Lal Barupal	Indian National Congress
2003	Madan Lal Meghwal	Bharatiya Janata Party
2008	Manju Meghwal	Indian National Congress
2013	Manju Baghmar	Bharatiya Janata Party
2018	Manju Meghwal	Indian National Congress
2023	Manju Baghmar	Bharatiya Janata Party

== Election results ==
=== 2023 ===
2023 Rajasthan Legislative Assembly election: Jayal
Party	Candidate	Votes	%	±%
BJP	Manju Baghmar	70,468	39.2	+19.32
INC	Manju Meghwal	68,903	38.33	−3.84
RLP	Bhanwarlal Bhati	32,799	18.24	−12.46
NOTA	None of the above	2,200	1.22	−0.26
Majority		1,565	0.87	−10.6
Turnout		179,783	68.52	−1.16
BJP gain from INC		Swing		

=== 2018 ===
Rajasthan Legislative Assembly Election, 2018: Jayal
Party	Candidate	Votes	%	±%
INC	Manju Meghwal	68,415	42.17	
RLP	Anil	49,811	30.7	
BJP	Manju Baghmar	32,261	19.88	
NUZP	Annu Devi	4,675	2.88	
Bharatiya Yuva Shakti	Jitendra	2,232	1.38	
NOTA	None of the above	2,401	1.48	
Majority		18,604	11.47	
Turnout		162,248	69.68	

== See also ==
- List of constituencies of the Rajasthan Legislative Assembly
- Nagaur district
