= Shrichand Kriplani =

Indian politician

Member of the 9th Rajasthan Legislative Assembly
- In office 1990 -1993
- Constituency: Nimbahera

Member of the 11th Rajasthan Legislative Assembly
- In office 1998 -1999
- Constituency: Nimbahera

Member of the 14th Rajasthan Legislative Assembly
- In office 2013 -2018
- Preceded by: Udailal Anjana
- Succeeded by: Udailal Anjana
- Constituency: Nimbahera

Member of the 16th Rajasthan Legislative Assembly
- Incumbent
- Assumed office 2023
- Preceded by: Udailal Anjana

Member of Parliament, Lok Sabha Chittorgarh
- In office 1999–2009
- Preceded by: Udailal Anjana
- Succeeded by: Girija Vyas

Minister of Urban Development and Housing Government of Rajasthan
- In office 2016–2018
- Chief Minister: Vasundhara Raje
- Succeeded by: Shanti Dhariwal

Personal details
- Born: 18 July 1958 (age 67) Nimbahera, Chittorgarh district, Rajasthan, India
- Party: Bharatiya Janata Party
- As of 16 June, 2020

Shrichand Kriplani (born 18 July 1958) is an Indian politician currently serving as a member of the 16th Rajasthan Legislative Assembly, representing the Nimbahera constituency as a member of the Bharatiya Janata Party. He previously served as an MLA from 1990 to 1993, again from 1998 to 1999, and later from 2013 to 2018, all representing the Nimbahera constituency. He also served as the Housing and Urban Development Minister under the Vasundhara Raje cabinet from 2016 to 2018.

== Political career ==
He previously served as an MLA from 1990 to 1993, then again from 1998 to 2003, and later from 2013 to 2018, representing the Nimbahera constituency.

He was inducted into the Vasundhara Raje cabinet as the Minister of Urban Development and Housing.

Following the 2023 Rajasthan Legislative Assembly election, he was re-elected as an MLA from the Nimbahera constituency, defeating Udai Lal Anjana, the candidate from the Indian National Congress (INC), by a margin of 3845 votes.
