= Gautam Kumar =

Indian politician

Gautam Kumar Dak

Minister of State, Government of Rajasthan
- Incumbent
- Assumed office 30 December 2023
- Governor: Kalraj Mishra; Haribhau Bagade
- Chief Minister: Bhajan Lal Sharma
- Ministry and Departments: List: Cooperative (I/C); Civil Aviation (I/C)
- Preceded by: Vishvendra Singh

Member of the Rajasthan Legislative Assembly
- Incumbent
- Assumed office 3 December 2023
- Preceded by: Lalit Kumar Ostwal
- Constituency: Bari Sadri
- In office 2013–2018
- Preceded by: Prakash Chaudhary
- Succeeded by: Lalit Kumar Ostwal
- Constituency: Bari Sadri

Personal details
- Born: 16 December 1977 (age 48) Dungla, Chittorgarh, Rajasthan, India
- Party: Bharatiya Janata Party – Rajasthan
- Spouse: Sapna Devi
- Children: 2
- Parent(s): Kanak Mal Dak (father); Prem Bai (mother)
- Education: B.Com.
- Alma mater: Mohanlal Sukhadia University
- Occupation: MLA
- Profession: Agriculture

Gautam Kumar Dak (born 16 December 1977) is an Indian politician Currently Serving as a Minister of State of Cooperative & Civil Aviation Department In Government of Rajasthan. He is 14th, & 16th, Member of the Rajasthan Legislative Assembly From Bari Sadri. He is Member of the Bhartiya Janta Party.

== Political career ==
In the 2013 Rajasthan Legislative Assembly election, he was elected as an MLA from the Bari Sadri constituency, defeating Prakash Chaudhary by 17,261 votes.

Following the 2023 Rajasthan Legislative Assembly election, he was re-elected as an MLA from the Bari Sadri constituency, defeating Badri Lal Jat, the candidate from the Indian National Congress (INC), by a margin of 11,832 votes.
