= Heeralal Nagar =

Indian politician

Minister of State, Government of Rajasthan
- Incumbent
- Assumed office 30 December 2023
- Governor: Kalraj Mishra; Haribhau Bagade
- Chief Minister: Bhajan Lal Sharma
- Ministry and Departments: List: Energy (Independent Charge)
- Preceded by: Bhanwar Singh Bhati

Member of the Rajasthan Legislative Assembly
- Incumbent
- Assumed office 3 December 2023
- Preceded by: Bharat Singh Kundanpur
- Constituency: Sangod
- In office 2013–2018
- Preceded by: Bharat Singh Kundanpur
- Succeeded by: Bharat Singh Kundanpur
- Constituency: Sangod

Personal details
- Born: 14 January 1960 (age 66) Antana, Atru, Baran, Rajasthan
- Party: Bharatiya Janata Party
- Parent(s): Chandalal Nagar (father); Kishore Bai (mother)
- Education: B.A.
- Alma mater: Delhi University
- Occupation: Politician
- Profession: Agriculture, business

Heeralal Nagar (born 14 January 1960) is an Indian politician currently serving as the Minister of State (Independent Charge) for the Energy Department in the Government of Rajasthan. He is a member of the Rajasthan Legislative Assembly, having represented the Sangod Assembly constituency in the 14th and 16th legislative assemblies as a member of the Bharatiya Janata Party (BJP).

== Political career ==
In the 2013 Rajasthan Legislative Assembly election, Heeralal Nagar was elected from the Sangod constituency as a BJP candidate. He lost the seat in 2018 to Bharat Singh Kundanpur of the Indian National Congress.

In the 2023 election, Nagar regained the Sangod seat, defeating INC candidate Bhanu Pratap Singh by a margin of 25,586 votes.

He assumed office as Minister of State (Independent Charge) for Energy on 30 December 2023 in the cabinet of Chief Minister Bhajan Lal Sharma.

== Ministerial positions ==
Office	Portfolio	Government	Term start	Term end	Chief Minister
Minister of State (Independent Charge)	Energy	Government of Rajasthan	30 December 2023	Incumbent	Bhajan Lal Sharma

== Electoral record ==
Election results
Year	Office	Constituency	Party	Votes	%	Opponent	Opponent Party	Votes	%	Result	Ref
2013	MLA	Sangod	Bharatiya Janata Party	70,495	53.56	Bharat Singh Kundanpur	Indian National Congress	51,263	38.95	Won	
2018	MLA	Sangod	Bharatiya Janata Party	72,286	46.66	Bharat Singh Kundanpur	Indian National Congress	74,154	47.87	Lost	
2023	MLA	Sangod	Bharatiya Janata Party	93,435	55.78	Bhanu Pratap Singh	Indian National Congress	67,849	40.51	Won	
