= Manisha Panwar =

Indian politician

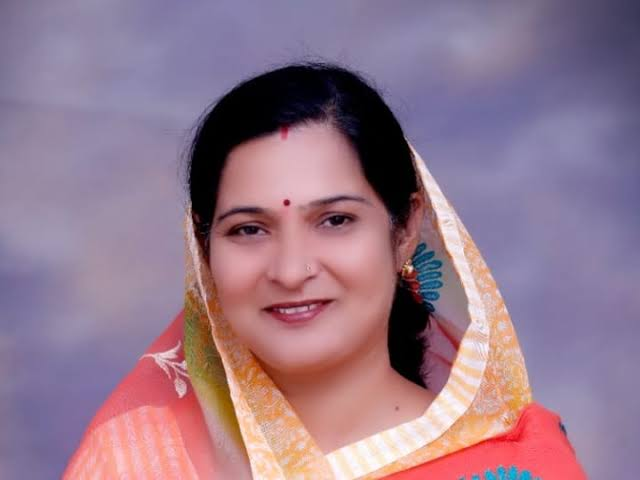

Member of the Rajasthan Legislative Assembly
- In office 11 December 2018 – 03 December 2023
- Constituency: Jodhpur

Personal details
- Born: 10 February 1980 (age 46) Jodhpur
- Party: Indian National Congress
- Spouse: Deepak Singh Panwar
- Education: Master of Arts (M.A.) in History
- Occupation: Politician

Manisha Panwar is an Indian politician from the Indian National Congress and a member of the Rajasthan Legislative Assembly representing the Jodhpur assembly constituency of Rajasthan.

== Early life and education ==
Manisha was born in Parmar (Rajput clan) clan of Ravana Rajputs. She is the daughter of Ram Singh Arya, Deputy Minister of Universal Arya Pratinidhi Sabha.

Manisha holds a postgraduate degree in History from Jai Narayan Vyas University, Jodhpur, awarded in the year 2001.
