= Leelsar =

Village in Barmer District, Rajasthan, India

Coordinates: 25°26′27″N 71°17′15″E

Leelsar is a village and gram panchayat in Barmer district of the Indian state of Rajasthan. According to 2011 census the population of Leelsar village is 1280. Leelsar village is famous for Jasnath Dham, where plants laden with flowers are the center of attraction. Mahant Motnath has planted trees for greenery in Leelsar Dham with the help of his devotees. Late Jawaharlal Maheshwari (Nehru), who was unopposed sarpanch for 28 years, was a resident of Leelsar village.
