= Pokaran Assembly constituency =

Constituency of the Rajasthan legislative assembly in India

Coordinates: 26.92°N 71.91°E

Pokaran
- Constituency No. 133 for the Rajasthan Legislative Assembly

Constituency details
- Country: India
- Region: North India
- State: Rajasthan
- District: Jaisalmer district
- Lok Sabha constituency: Jodhpur
- Established: 2008
- Reservation: None

Member of Legislative Assembly
- 16th Rajasthan Legislative Assembly
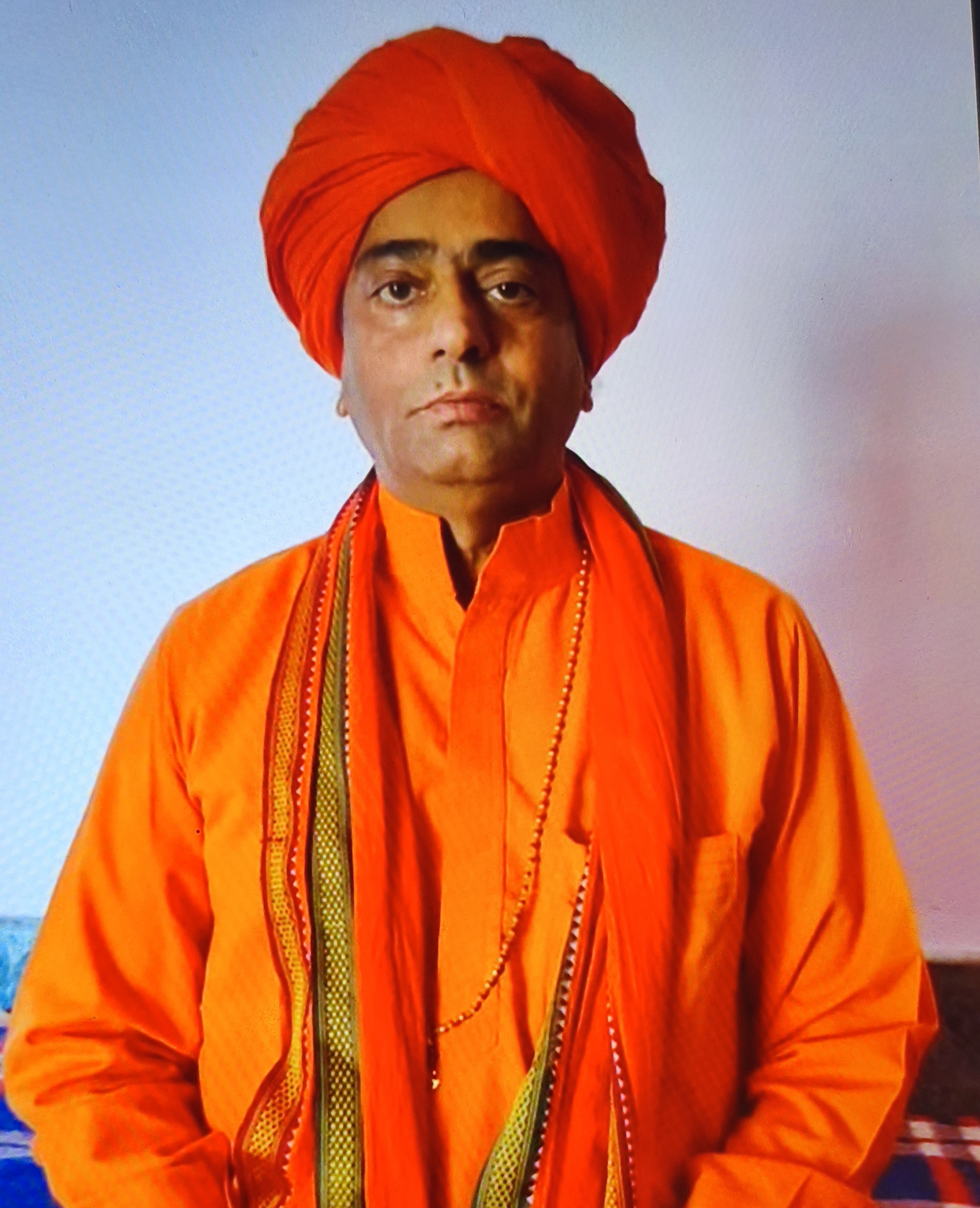
- Incumbent Mahant Pratap Puri
- Party: Bharatiya Janata Party
- Elected year: 2023

Pokaran Assembly constituency is one of constituencies of Rajasthan Legislative Assembly in the Jodhpur Lok Sabha constituency.

== Members of the Legislative Assembly ==
Year	Name	Party
2008	Saleh Mohammad	Indian National Congress
2013	Shaitan Singh	Bharatiya Janata Party
2018	Saleh Mohammad	Indian National Congress
2023	Mahant Pratap Puri	Bharatiya Janata Party

== Election results ==
=== 2023 ===
2023 Rajasthan Legislative Assembly election: Pokaran
Party	Candidate	Votes	%	±%
BJP	Mahant Pratap Puri	112,989	56.84	▲9.13
INC	Saleh Mohammad	77,508	38.99	▼9.23
RLP	Devilal	4,696	2.36	
NOTA	None of the above	773	0.39	▼0.26
Majority		35,481	17.85	▲17.34
Turnout		198,794	88.48	▲0.51
BJP gain from INC		Swing		

=== 2018 ===
2018 Rajasthan Legislative Assembly election: Pokaran
Party	Candidate	Votes	%	±%
INC	Saleh Mohammad	82,964	48.22	
BJP	Mahant Pratap Puri	82,092	47.71	
Independent	Paramaram	2,748	1.6	
BSP	Tulchha Ram	2,187	1.27	
NOTA	None of the above	1,122	0.65	
Majority		872	0.51	
Turnout		172,069	87.97	
INC gain from BJP		Swing		

=== 2013 ===
2013 Rajasthan Legislative Assembly election: Pokaran
Party	Candidate	Votes	%	±%
BJP	Shaitan Singh	85,010	59.40	
INC	Saleh Mohammad	50,566	35.33	
Independent	Khajoo Khan	2,824	1.97	
BSP	Tulchha Ram	1,800	1.26	
NOTA	None of the above	1,519	1.06	
Majority		34,444	24.07	
Turnout		1,43,287	87.73	
BJP hold		Swing		

== See also ==
- Member of the Legislative Assembly (India)
