= Jogeshwar Garg =

Indian politician

Govt. Chief Whip Rajasthan Legislative Assembly
- Incumbent
- Assumed office 9 January 2024
- Preceded by: Mahesh Joshi

Member of the Rajasthan Legislative Assembly
- Incumbent
- Assumed office 2023
- Preceded by: Amrita Meghwal
- Constituency: Jalore

Personal details
- Party: Bharatiya Janata Party

Jogeshwar Garg is an Indian politician serving as a member of the 16th Rajasthan Legislative Assembly, representing the Jalore Assembly constituency, Jalore district.
