= Sanjana Agri =

Indian politician

Member of the Rajasthan Legislative Assembly
- In office 2008–2018
- Constituency: Sojat

Personal details
- Party: Bharatiya Janata Party
- Occupation: Politician

Sanjana Agri is an Indian politician. She was elected to the Rajasthan Legislative Assembly for two terms from Sojat from 2008 to 2018. She is a member of the Bharatiya Janata Party.
