= Shanti Lal Chaplot =

Indian politician

Speaker of Rajasthan Legislative Assembly
- In office 1995 - 1998
- Preceded by: Hari Shankar Bhabhra
- Succeeded by: Samrath Lal Meena

Personal details
- Born: 2 March 1946 (age 80) Udaipur, Rajasthan
- Party: Bharatiya Janata Party

Shanti Lal Chaplot (2 March 1946) is a senior Bharatiya Janata Party leader from Rajasthan, India, former Member of Parliament, Lok Sabha and former Speaker of Rajasthan Legislative Assembly from 7 April 1995 to 18 March 1998.

== Biography ==
He was born on 2 March 1946 to Shri Chunilal Chaplot in Sanwad in Udaipur district. He is a five time MLA from Mavli, Udaipur district, & was elected as a member of 12th Lok Sabha from Udaipur. He has also been awarded the "Best MLA award" in 2008.
