= H. K. Vyas =

Indian politician

Hari Krishna Vyas (born 11 August 1922, date of death unknown) was an Indian politician.

Vyas was born on 11 August 1922. As of the 1940s, Vyas was a student movement leader, active in the All India Students Federation. He served as the president of the C.P. and Berar Trade Union Congress 1948–1949. As of the 1950s and 1960s Vyas was the Rajasthan state secretary of Communist Party of India. Vyas contested the Jodhpur City "B" seat in the 1951 Rajasthan Legislative Assembly election, receiving 4.7% of the votes. In a subsequent bye-election in 1952, he won the Jodhpur City "B" seat with 27.9% of the votes. He thus became the sole communist member of the first Rajasthan legislature. In 1953 he became a member of the CPI National Council. Around the late 1950s Vyas and V.V. Joshi founded Red Flag trade unions in the National Engineering Industries and Man Industries Corporation. He lost the Jodhpur City II seat in the 1957 Rajasthan Legislative Assembly election, coming in second place with 4,463 votes (20.94%). In 1962 he became the Vice President of the Indian Association for Afro-Asian Solidarity.

When the CPI split in 1964, Vyas remained in the party. As the rival Communist Party of India (Marxist) had seized most of the trade union structures of CPI in Rajasthan, a new All India Trade Union Congress Rajasthan State Committee was formed in 1965 with Vyas as its secretary.

In 1973 Vyas was appointed as the editor of the daily newspaper Janyug. He was also in charge of managing the People's Publishing House.

Vyas was the sole CPI candidate in Rajasthan in the 1980 Indian general election. He contested the Ajmer seat, and came in third place with 51,524 votes (13.79%).

In the 1980s Vyas emerged as a critic of the party leadership and a defender of the S.A. Dange line. Whilst Dange himself left CPI to form the All India Communist Party, Vyas and Mohit Sen remained in CPI and sought to uphold the Dange line within the party. Vyas was removed from the CPI National Council at the 13th party congress in 1986. He returned to CPI and became its State secretary. Vyas died prior to July 2002.
