= Manju Baghmar =

Indian politician

Minister of State, Government of Rajasthan
- Incumbent
- Assumed office 30 December 2023
- Governor: Haribhau Bagade
- Chief Minister: Bhajan Lal Sharma
- Ministry and Departments: List: Public Works; Women & Child Development; Child Empowerment
- Preceded by: Mamta Bhupesh

Member of the Rajasthan Legislative Assembly
- Incumbent
- Assumed office 3 December 2023
- Preceded by: Manju Meghwal
- Constituency: Jayal
- In office 11 December 2013 – 10 December 2018
- Succeeded by: Manju Meghwal
- Constituency: Jayal

Personal details
- Born: 3 April 1970 (age 56) Beawar, Ajmer district, India
- Party: Bharatiya Janata Party
- Spouse: Rugha Ram Panwar
- Children: 2
- Education: M.Com. PhD; L.L.B. & LL.M. PG Diploma in Human Rights
- Alma mater: Maharshi Dayanand Saraswati University, Mohanlal Sukhadia University
- Occupation: MLA
- Profession: Professor
- Rajasthan Assembly

Dr. Manju Baghmar (born 3 April 1970) is an Indian politician serving as a Minister of State in the Government of Rajasthan, overseeing the Public Works, Women & Child Development, and Child Empowerment departments.

She is a two-time elected member of the Rajasthan Legislative Assembly from the Jayal Assembly constituency, representing the Bharatiya Janata Party.

== Political career ==
Baghmar was first elected to the Rajasthan Legislative Assembly in 2013 and served until 2018. In the 2023 Rajasthan Legislative Assembly election, she returned to the Assembly by defeating Indian National Congress candidate Dr. Manju Devi by a margin of 1,565 votes.

== Ministry ==
In the Bhajan Lal Sharma ministry, Dr. Manju Baghmar serves as Minister of State with independent charge of the following departments:

- Public Works
- Women & Child Development
- Child Empowerment

She assumed office on 30 December 2023.

== Electoral record ==
Election results
Year	Office	Constituency	Party	Votes (Manju Baghmar)	%	Opponent	Opponent Party	Votes	%	Result	Ref
2023	MLA	Jayal	Bharatiya Janata Party	70,468	38.33	Manju Devi	Indian National Congress	68,903	37.50	Won	
2013	MLA	Jayal	Bharatiya Janata Party	72,738	51.68	Manju Devi	Indian National Congress	59,629	42.37	Won	

== See also ==
- Politics of India
- Parliament of India
- Government of India
