= Jalore Assembly constituency =

Legislative Assembly constituency in Rajasthan State, India

Coordinates: 25.33°N 72.62°E

Jalore
- Constituency No. 142 for the Rajasthan Legislative Assembly

Constituency details
- Country: India
- Region: North India
- State: Rajasthan
- District: Jalore
- Lok Sabha constituency: Jalore
- Established: 1951
- Total electors: 287,956
- Reservation: SC

Member of Legislative Assembly
- 16th Rajasthan Legislative Assembly
- Incumbent Jogeshwar Garg
- Party: Bharatiya Janata Party
- Elected year: 2018

Jalore Assembly constituency is one of the 200 Legislative Assembly constituencies of Rajasthan state in India. It is in Jalore district and is reserved for candidates belonging to the Scheduled Castes.

== Members of the Legislative Assembly ==
Year	Name	Party
1951	Madho Singh	Akhil Bharatiya Ram Rajya Parishad
1951	Hazari Singh	Independent
1957	Hasiya	Akhil Bharatiya Ram Rajya Parishad
1957	Narpat Singh	Akhil Bharatiya Ram Rajya Parishad
1962	Virda Ram	Indian National Congress
1967	J.Ram	Swatantra Party
1972	Virda Ram	Indian National Congress
1977	Teekam Chand Kant	Janata Party
1980	Mangilal	Indian National Congress
1985	Mangi Lal Arya	Indian National Congress
1990	Jogeshwar Garg	Bharatiya Janata Party
1993	Jogeshwar Garg	Bharatiya Janata Party
1998	Ganeshi Ram Meghwal	Bharatiya Janata Party
2003	Jogeshwar Garg	Bharatiya Janata Party
2008	Ram Lal Meghwal	Indian National Congress
2013	Amrita Meghwal	Bharatiya Janata Party
2018	Jogeswar Garg	Bharatiya Janata Party
2023	Jogeswar Garg	Bharatiya Janata Party

== Election results ==
=== 2023 ===
2023 Rajasthan Legislative Assembly election: Jalore
Party	Candidate	Votes	%	±%
BJP	Jogeshwar Garg	84,519	46.41	−11.89
INC	Ramila Meghwal	64,983	35.69	−1.01
Independent	Pavani Devi	19,957	10.96	
Independent	Ramlal Meghwal	4,154	2.28	
BSP	Om Prakash Chouhan	3,459	1.9	
Independent	Bhagwanaram	1,847	1.01	
NOTA	None of the above	3,177	1.74	−0.79
Majority		19,536	10.72	−10.88
Turnout		182,096	63.24	+1.85
BJP hold		Swing		

=== 2018 ===
Rajasthan Legislative Assembly Election, 2018: Jalore
Party	Candidate	Votes	%	±%
BJP	Jogeshwar Garg	95,086	58.3	
INC	Manju Meghwal	59,852	36.7	
Bharat Vahini Party	Om Prakash Chouhan	2,190	1.34	
BMP	Bheemaram	1,842	1.13	
NOTA	None of the above	4,130	2.53	
Majority		35,234	21.6	
Turnout		163,100	61.39	

== See also ==
- List of constituencies of the Rajasthan Legislative Assembly
- Jalore district
