= Dharmnarayan Joshi =

Indian politician

Member of the Rajasthan Legislative Assembly
- Constituency: Mavli

Personal details
- Born: 11 December 1955 (age 70) Brahmano Ka Kherwada, Udaipur
- Party: Bharatiya Janata Party
- Occupation: Politician, social service

Dharmnarayan Joshi is an Indian politician from the Bharatiya Janata Party and a member of the Rajasthan Legislative Assembly representing the Mavli Vidhan Sabha constituency of Rajasthan.
