= Mavli =

Town in Rajasthan, India

- Town
- Location in Rajasthan, India
- Coordinates: 24°47′N 73°59′E
- Country: India
- State: Rajasthan
- District: Udaipur

Government
  - Body: Nagar Palika

Population
  - Total: 14,630

Languages
  - Official: Hindi
- Time zone: UTC+5:30 (IST)
- PIN: 313203
- Telephone code: STD Code 02955
- Vehicle registration: RJ-27 (Udaipur)
- Nearest city: Nathdwara – 28 km
- Lok Sabha constituency: C. P. Joshi (MP)
- Mavli Assembly constituency: Pushkar Lal Dangi (MLA)
- Civic agency: Municipality

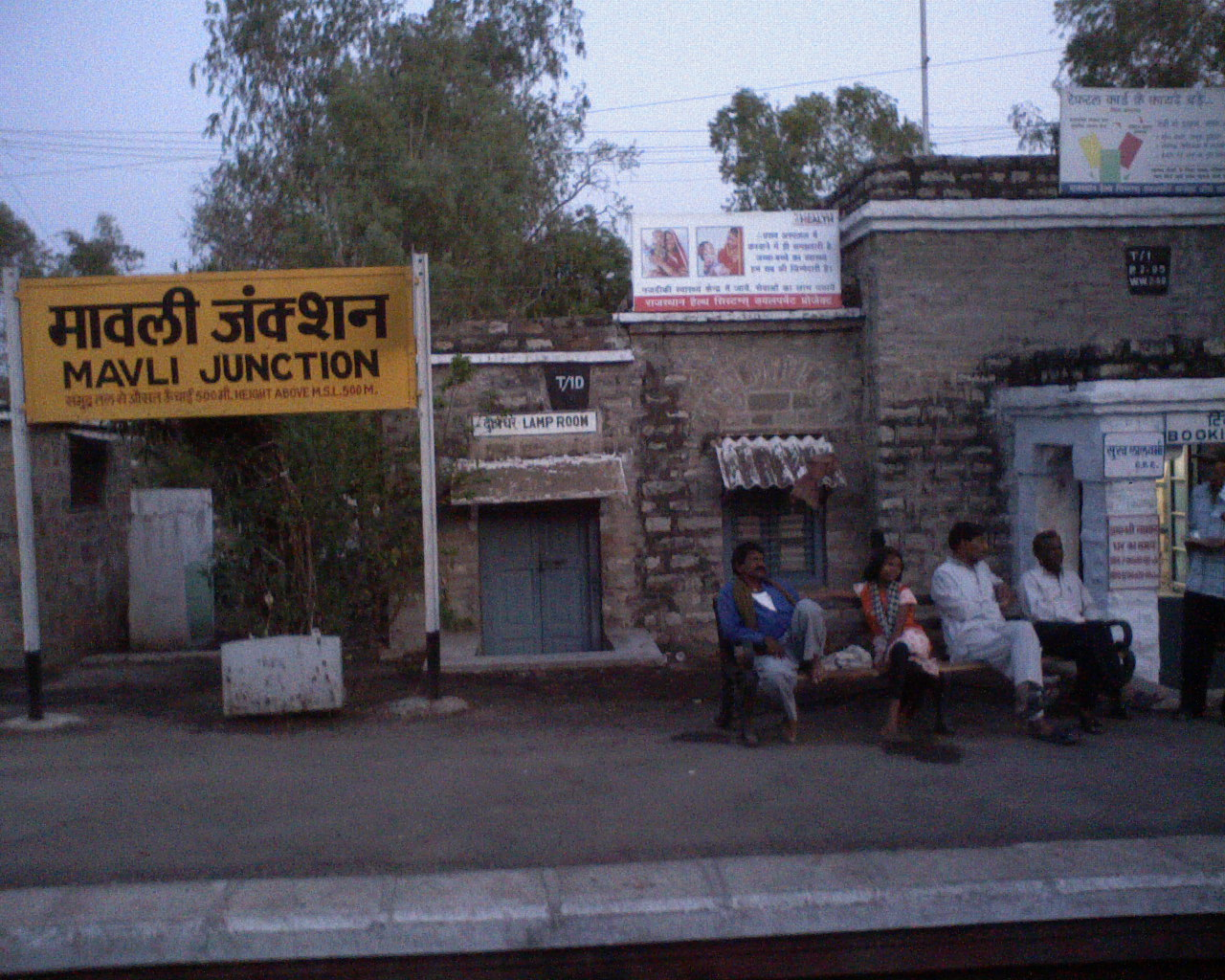
Mavli, Rajasthan, India

Mavli is a town (Nagar Palika) in Udaipur district in Rajasthan, India.

The Mavli Junction railway station is under the Ajmer railway division of the North Western Railway zone of Indian Railways that connects Marwar Junction, Chittaurgarh Junction, Bari Sadri and Udaipur city. There is a route between Mavli and Nathdwara.

The town has higher secondary schools and government colleges.

== Political ==
The city is a municipality with its headquarters in Mavli (Nagar Palika) and a subdivision office in Udaipur district. It is a Vidhan Sabha (state legislative assembly) seat, and Shanti Lal Chaplot was elected from this seat. This town is in the Chittaurgarh Lok Sabha constituency.

In 2023, Pushkar Lal Dangi from the INC party won the Mavli Assembly Election with 77,696 votes, defeating second-placed candidate Dr. K.G. Paliwal by 1,567 votes. The percentage of voters polled in Mavli Assembly constituency was recorded at 78.26 percent.
