= Poora Ram Choudhary =

Indian politician

Member of the Rajasthan Legislative Assembly
- Incumbent
- Assumed office 2013
- Constituency: Bhinmal

Personal details
- Born: 6 October 1956 (age 69) Kawtra, Bhinmal
- Party: Bharatiya Janata Party
- Spouse: Smt. Soni Devi
- Children: 1 Son & 4 Daughters
- Occupation: Politician

Poora Ram Choudhary is an Indian politician from the Bharatiya Janata Party and a member of the Rajasthan Legislative Assembly representing the Bhinmal Vidhan Sabha constituency of Rajasthan.
