= Chohtan Assembly constituency =

Constituency of the Rajasthan legislative assembly in India

Coordinates: 25.48°N 71.07°E

Chohtan
- Constituency No. 140 for the Rajasthan Legislative Assembly

Constituency details
- Country: India
- Region: North India
- State: Rajasthan
- District: Barmer
- Established: 1957
- Total electors: 309,744
- Reservation: SC

Member of Legislative Assembly
- 16th Rajasthan Legislative Assembly
- Incumbent Aduram Meghwal
- Party: Bhartiya Janata Party
- Elected year: 2023

Chohtan Assembly constituency is a constituency of the Rajasthan Legislative Assembly covering the city of Chohtan in the Barmer district of Rajasthan, India. Chohtan is one of eight assembly constituencies in the Barmer Lok Sabha constituency.

== Members of the Legislative Assembly ==
Election	Name	Party
1957	Fateh Singh	Indian National Congress
1962	Fateh Singh	Akhil Bharatiya Ram Rajya Parishad
1967	A. Badi	Independent
1972	Abdul Hadi	Indian National Congress
1977	Abdul Hadi	Indian National Congress
1980	Bhagwandas Doshi	Indian National Congress
1985	Abdul Hadi	Lokdal
1990	Abdul Hadi	Janata Dal
1993	Bhagwandas Doshi	Independent
1998	Abdul Hadi	Indian National Congress
2003	Gangaram Choudhary	Bhartiya Janata Party
2008	Padmaram Meghwal	Indian National Congress
2013	Tarun Rai Kaga	Bhartiya Janata Party
2018	Padmaram Meghwal	Indian National Congress
2023	Aduram Meghwal	Bharatiya Janta Party

== Election results ==
=== 2023 ===
2023 Rajasthan Legislative Assembly election: Chohtan
Party	Candidate	Votes	%	±%
BJP	Adu Ram Meghwal	103,205	43.46	+4.01
INC	Padmaram	101,777	42.86	+1.29
RLP	Tarun Rai Kaga	22,149	9.33	−2.62
BSP	Bhartharam	4,572	1.93	+0.28
NOTA	None of the above	3,901	1.64	−1.04
Majority		1,428	0.6	−1.52
Turnout		237,451	76.66	−0.05
BJP gain from INC		Swing		

=== 2018 ===
2018 Rajasthan Legislative Assembly election: Chohtan
Party	Candidate	Votes	%	±%
INC	Padmaram Meghwal	83,601	41.57	
BJP	Adu Ram Meghwal	79,339	39.45	
RLP	Surta Ram Meghwal	24,036	11.95	
Bharatiya Yuva Shakti	Dhoora Ram	3,625	1.8	
BSP	Ravindra Kumar Meghwal	3,314	1.65	
AAP	Nainaram	1,810	0.9	
NOTA	None of the above	5,391	2.68	
Majority		4,262	2.12	
Turnout		201,116	76.71	
INC gain from		Swing		
