= Suresh Dhaker =

Indian politician

Member of the Rajasthan Legislative Assembly
- In office Dec 2013 – Dec 2018
- Preceded by: Rajendra Singh Bidhuri

Member of the Rajasthan Legislative Assembly
- Incumbent
- Assumed office Dec 2023
- Preceded by: Rajendra Singh Bidhuri
- Constituency: Begun (168)

Personal details
- Party: Bharatiya Janata Party
- Occupation: Politician

Dr. Suresh Dhaker is an Indian politician from the Bharatiya Janata Party and a member of the Rajasthan Legislative Assembly representing the Begun Vidhan Sabha constituency of Rajasthan.
