= Sedwa =

Sedwa Serwa
- Tehsil
- Location of Sedwa Tehsil in Barmer District
- Country: India
- State: Rajasthan
- District: Barmer district

Government
  - Type: A rural local government - Block level
  - Body: Tehsil
- Elevation: 134 m (440 ft)
  - Density: 92/km^{2} (240/sq mi)

Sindhi Marwadi Dhatki(sindhi) Languages
  - Official: Hindi
- PIN: 344706
- Nearest city: Barmer, Balotra, Sanchore

Sedwa is a Tehsil and block of Barmer district in Rajasthan, northern India.

Sedwa is a Town in south western barmer district it is tehsil and Subdivisional Magistrate. Most of its economy is dependent on farming mainly the spice cumin is produced in tonnes.

== Banks ==
1. State Bank of India, Sedwa IFSC CODE : SBIN0031704

2. Punjab National Bank, Sedwa IFSC CODE :PUNB0878500 [2]
