= Dausa Lok Sabha constituency =

Lok Sabha Constituency in Rajasthan

Coordinates: 26.9°N 76.3°E

Dausa
- Lok Sabha constituency
- Interactive Map Outlining Dausa Lok Sabha Constituency

Constituency details
- Country: India
- Region: North India
- State: Rajasthan
- Assembly constituencies: Bassi; Chaksu; Thanagazi; Bandikui; Mahuwa; Sikrai; Dausa; Lalsot
- Established: 1952
- Reservation: ST

Member of Parliament
- 18th Lok Sabha
- Incumbent Murari Lal Meena
- Party: Indian National Congress
- Elected year: 2024
- Preceded by: Jaskaur Meena

Dausa Lok Sabha constituency (Hindi pronunciation: [d̪ɔːsaː]) is one of the 25 Lok Sabha (parliamentary) constituencies in Rajasthan state in India.

== Assembly segments ==
Presently, Dausa Lok Sabha constituency comprises eight Vidhan Sabha (legislative assembly) segments. These are:

#	Name	District	Member	Party	Leading (in 2024)
57	Bassi (ST)	Jaipur	Laxman Meena	INC	INC
58	Chaksu (SC)	Jaipur	Ramavtar Bairwa	BJP	BJP
64	Thanagazi	Alwar	Kanti Prasad Meena	INC	INC
85	Bandikui	Dausa	Bhagchand Saini Tankda	BJP	INC
86	Mahuwa	Dausa	Rajendra Meena	BJP	INC
87	Sikrai (SC)	Dausa	Vikram Bansiwal	BJP	INC
88	Dausa	Dausa	Deen Dayal Bairwa	INC	INC
89	Lalsot (ST)	Dausa	Rambilas Meena	BJP	INC

== Members of Parliament ==
Year	Member	Party
1952	Raj Bahadur	Indian National Congress
1957	G. D. Somani	Indian National Congress
1962	Prithvi Raj	Swatantra Party
1967	R. C. Ganpat	Swatantra Party
1968^	Nawal Kishore Sharma	Indian National Congress
1971	Nawal Kishore Sharma	Indian National Congress
1977	Nathu Singh Gurjar	Janata Party
1980	Nawal Kishore Sharma	Indian National Congress
1984	Rajesh Pilot	Indian National Congress
1989	Nathu Singh Gurjar	Bharatiya Janata Party
1991	Rajesh Pilot	Indian National Congress
1996	Rajesh Pilot	Indian National Congress
1998	Rajesh Pilot	Indian National Congress
1999	Rajesh Pilot	Indian National Congress
2000^	Rama Pilot	Indian National Congress
2004	Sachin Pilot	Indian National Congress
2009	Kirodi Lal Meena	Independent
2014	Harish Meena	Bharatiya Janata Party
2019	Jaskaur Meena	Bharatiya Janata Party
2024	Murari Lal Meena	Indian National Congress

== Election results ==
=== 2024 ===
2024 Indian general election: Dausa
Party	Candidate	Votes	%	±%
INC	Murari Lal Meena	646,266	60.24	▲15.99
BJP	Kanhaiya Lal Meena	4,08,926	38.12	▼13.51
BSP	Sonu Dhanka	6,797	0.63	
NOTA	None of the above	5,846	0.54	
Majority		2,37,340	22.12	
Turnout		10,72,734		
INC gain from BJP		Swing		

=== 2019 ===
2019 Indian general elections: Dausa
Party	Candidate	Votes	%	±%
BJP	Jaskaur Meena	548,733	51.63	
INC	Savita Meena	4,70,289	44.25	
BSP	Dwarka Prasad Maheshwara	13,414	1.26	
NOTA	None of the above	7,394	0.70	
Majority		78,444	7.36	
Turnout		10,64,078	61.50	+0.42
BJP hold		Swing		

=== 2014 ===
2014 Indian general elections: Dausa
Party	Candidate	Votes	%	±%
BJP	Harish Chandra Meena	315,059	33.84	
NPP	Dr. Kirodi Lal Meena	2,69,655	28.97	
INC	Namo Narain Meena	1,81,272	19.47	
Independent	Shiv Pal Gurjar	82,549	8.87	
Independent	Bimla Devi Meena	20,037	2.15	
Majority		45,404	4.87	
Turnout		9,30,921	61.08	
BJP gain from Independent		Swing		

=== 2009 ===
2009 Indian general elections: Dausa
Party	Candidate	Votes	%	±%
Independent	Dr. Kirodi Lal Meena	433,666	51.53	
Independent	Qummer Rubbani	2,95,907	35.16	
INC	Laxman	59,154	7.03	
BJP	Ram Kishore Meena	28,398	3.37	
Majority		1,14,865	16.02	
Turnout		8,41,412	63.95	
Independent gain from INC		Swing		

=== 2004 ===
2004 Indian general elections: Dausa
Party	Candidate	Votes	%	±%
INC	Sachin Pilot	369,935	52	+1.65
BJP	Kartar Singh Bhadana	255,070	35.58	−3.38
INLD	Rohitash Kumar Sharma	46,938	6.55	
BSP	Rakesh Meena	15,437	2.15	
Independent	Subhash Chandra Sharma	12,004	1.67	
RJVP	Dhanna Ram	7,672	1.07	
Independent	Rohitash Kuldeep	3,924	0.55	
Independent	Ramesh	3,047	0.43	
SP	Mukarram Ali	2,874	0.40	−0.13
Majority		114,865	16.02	+15.09
Turnout		716,901	49.04	−10.58
INC hold		Swing	+1.65	

== See also ==
- Dausa district
- List of constituencies of the Lok Sabha
