= Mandawar Mahwa Road railway station =

Railway station in Rajasthan, India

Mandawar Mahwa Road

General information
- Location: Mandawar, Dausa district, Rajasthan; India
- Coordinates: 27.155983°N 76.850773°E
- System: Indian Railways station
- Owner: Indian Railways
- Operator: North Central Railway
- Line: Bandikui–Bharatpur line
- Platforms: 2
- Tracks: 2

Construction
- Structure type: Standard (on ground station)
- Parking: Yes

Other information
- Status: Functioning
- Station code: MURD
- Zone(s): North Central Railway
- Division(s): Agra
Location
- Location within India Location within Rajasthan

Mandawar Mahwa Road railway station is a railway station in Dausa district, Rajasthan. Its code is MURD. It serves Mandawar and Mahwa. The station consists of 2 platforms. Passenger, Superfast trains halt here.
