= Sainthal =

Sainthal is a name of a number of localities in India:

- Sainthal, Rajasthan
- Sainthal, Uttar Pradesh
