= Meena High Court =

मीणा हाईकोर्ट
- Location: Nangal Rajawatan
- Nearest city: Dausa ,Rajasthan

Meena High Court is a local social-cultural landmark and community assembly site associated with the Meena (Mina) tribal community along with all community in eastern Rajasthan, India.It is located at Nangal Rajawatan in Dausa district, Rajasthan It is not a judicial high court under the Constitution of India; rather the name “High Court” is used symbolically to describe a place for community gatherings, dispute-resolution by local leaders, cultural programmes, and political rallies.

== History of Meena High Court ==
The 1993 Chudiawas incident refers to a significant social uprising in Rajasthan that led to the establishment of the Meena High Court in Nangal Pyariwas as a symbol of community-led justice. The unrest began following the July 16, 1993, murder of Bhagwanaram, allegedly orchestrated by his wife, Premadevi, and her lover, Ghasi; when local law enforcement failed to take satisfactory action under Section 302 of the IPC, a Mahapanchayat representing 11 villages convened on August 24 to deliver a traditional verdict. The assembly found the accused guilty and subjected them to public shaming, leading to a violent confrontation with the state after police arrested the participating village elders (Panch Patels). The arrest of these leaders sparked a massive movement led by Dr. Kirodi Lal Meena, culminating in a march of approximately 50,000 people to the Dausa collectorate that successfully pressured the government into releasing the incarcerated elders. This event solidified the influence of traditional Khap Panchayats in the region and institutionalized the Meena High Court as a permanent venue for resolving social disputes through customary practices. Over time, community contributions funded its development into a large complex, often described as costing several crores of rupees. Since then, it has functioned as a symbolic “court” of the people—hosting cultural celebrations, community dispute resolutions, and political rallies.Today, it stands as both a cultural landmark and a political mobilisation hub for the Meena community, though it has no legal status as a court of law.

== World Tribal Day ==
On 9 August World Tribal Day, also known as the International Day of the World's Indigenous Peoples, is celebrated every year at Meena High Court. This day is observed to honor tribal communities and to spread awareness about their culture, traditions, and history, especially the Meena community. On this occasion, the school organizes simple programmes such as speeches, cultural activities, and discussions to help students understand the importance of tribal society and their contribution to the nation.

The celebration at Meena High Court also focuses on teaching respect, equality, and unity. Students and teachers take part in activities that highlight the need to protect tribal languages, customs, and traditional knowledge. World Tribal Day helps create awareness about the rights of tribal people and encourages everyone to value and preserve their rich cultural heritage.
