= Aund Meena =

Aund Meena is a village in Mahwa tehsil of Dausa district in the state of Rajasthan, India. It was founded by Meenas, so they named it Aund Meena. The village is administrated by a Sarpanch, who is an elected representative.
