= Peetaliya Balaji =

Village in Rajasthan, India

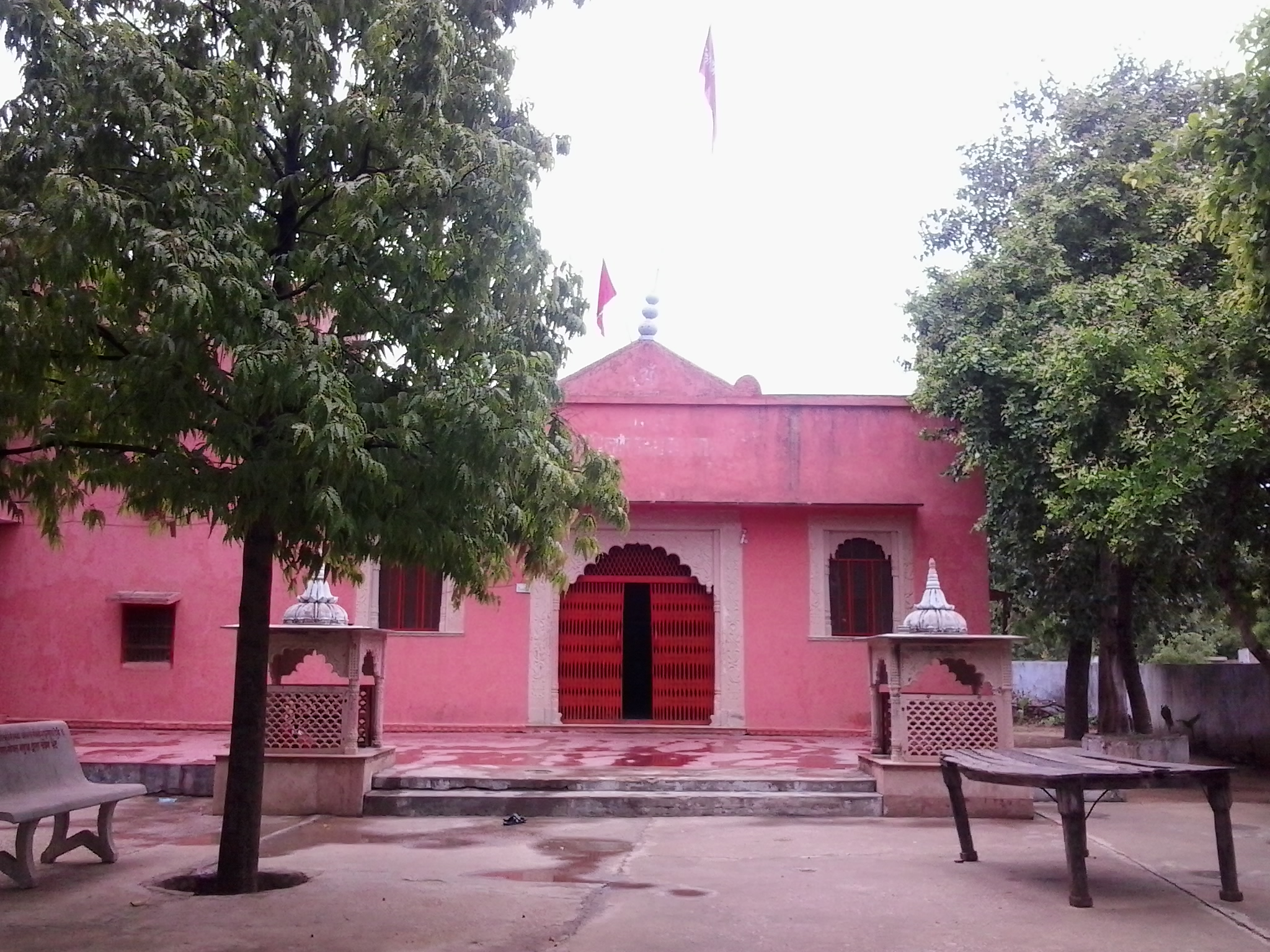
Peetaliya Balaji

Peetaliya Balaji, also known as Balaji ka Nagla, is a village in Mahwa town, Dausa district, Rajasthan, India. It is just 2.9 km away from the Mahwa bypass. It is 70 km away from its district headquarters Dausa and 125 km from the state capital of Jaipur via National Highway 21.

Peetaliya Balaji is a part of Rout and mainly consists of five parts mainly, which are:

- Beech ka nagla
- Niche ka nagla (also known as Megha ka nagla)
- Upar ka nagla (also known as Tundipura or Bhainsa ka nagla)
- Moti ka nagla (mori wali basti)
- Nahar ka nagla.
- Band ki basti.

Most of the people in the village Peetaliya Balaji are saini (also known as Mali or Gardeners).

There is a famous and old temple of (Hanuman ji) named as Mandir Peetaliya Balaji.

The History of this Hanuman ji temple is that In Early time before 1990 A Businessman was chased by some robbers and killers and he came in the feet of Lord Hanuman where today the temple is. At that time there was no building of temple but a small high lifted platform was here.

The Business was a Rich man and was Baniya from cast and his sir name was Peetaliya as our grandfathers says him Peetaliya Seth. He was secured under the shade of Lord Hanuman statue.

And promised to the villagers to construct a building for Hanuman ji Statue afterthat this temple came in its existence with the name of Peetaliya and Balaji is a hindi word stands for Hanuman ji. So the name got fame with Peetaliya Balaji.

Editing by GHRITADITYA GAUTAM( Village Boy ).
