= Durjanwas =

Durjanwas is a village of Salempura Gram Panchayat, and is located in Lalsot Tehsil in Dausa District, Rajasthan, India. Its pin code is 303511.

== Geography ==
It is 329 metres above sea level.
