= Sawai Madhopur Assembly constituency =

Legislative Assembly constituency in Rajasthan State, India

Coordinates: 26.03°N 76.36°E

Sawai Madhopur
- Constituency No. 92 for the Rajasthan Legislative Assembly

Constituency details
- Country: India
- Region: North India
- State: Rajasthan
- District: Sawai Madhopur
- Lok Sabha constituency: Tonk-Sawai Madhopur
- Established: 1951
- Total electors: 258,256
- Reservation: None

Member of Legislative Assembly
- 16th Rajasthan Legislative Assembly
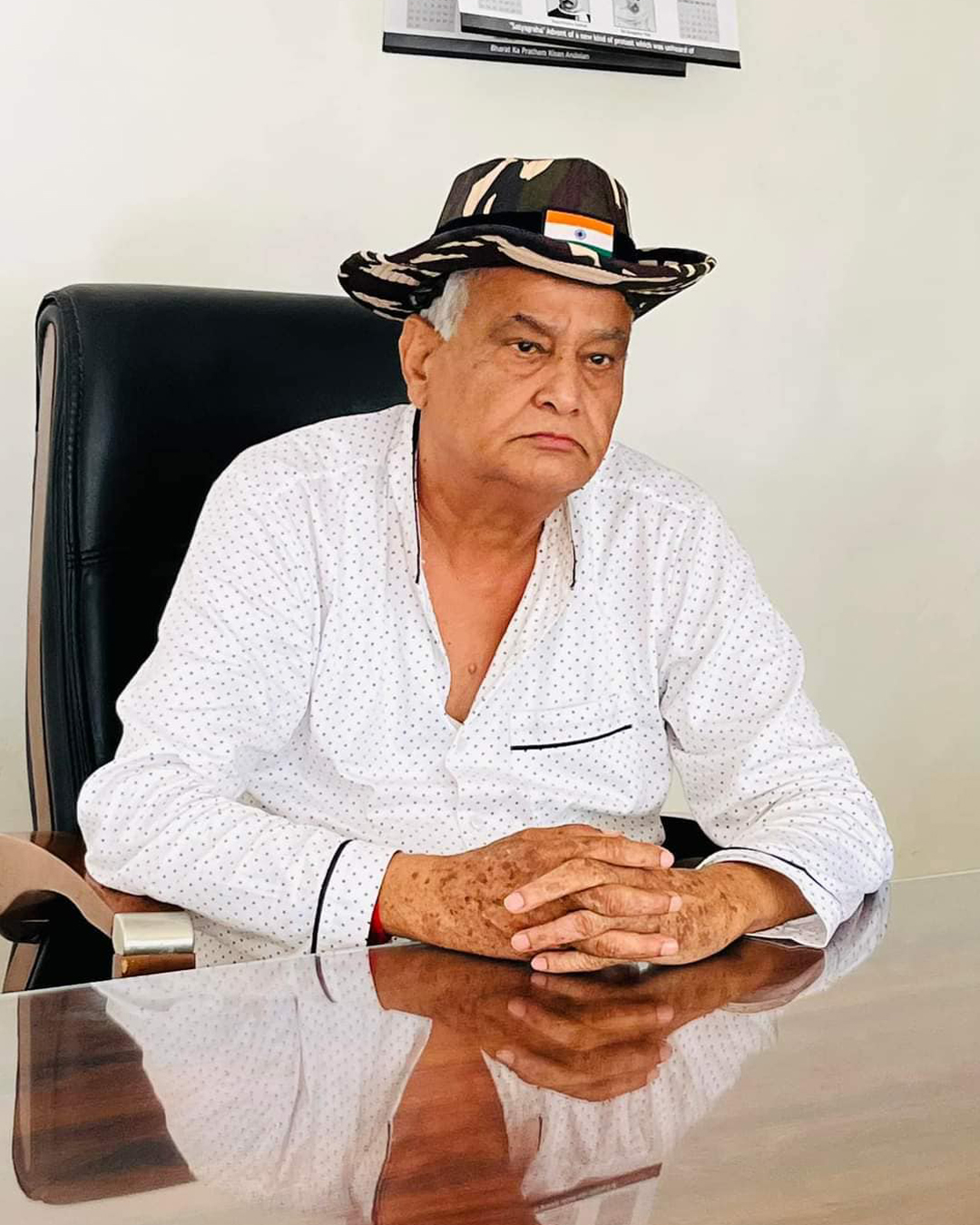
- Incumbent Dr Kirodi Lal Meena
- Party: Bharatiya Janata Party
- Elected year: 2023
- Preceded by: Danish Abrar

Sawai Madhopur Assembly constituency is one of the 200 Legislative Assembly constituencies of Rajasthan state in India. It is part of Sawai Madhopur district.

== Members of the Legislative Assembly ==
Election	Member	Party
1951	Shivdas Goyal	Indian National Congress
1957	Mangi Lal	Indian National Congress
1957	Abid Ali	Indian National Congress
1962	Ram Singh	Swatantra Party
1967	Hari Ballabh Sharma	Swatantra Party
1972	Farooq Hasan	Indian National Congress
1977	Manzoor Ali	Janata Party
1980	Hansraj	Bhartiya Janata Party
1985	Moti Lal Meena	Independent
1990	Moti Lal Meena	Janata Dal
1993	Narender Kanwar	Independent
1998	Yasmin Abrar	Indian National Congress
2003	Kirodi Lal Meena (Note: Food and Food supply minister)	Bhartiya Janata Party
2008	Alauddin Azad	Indian National Congress
2013	Diya Kumari	Bhartiya Janata Party
2018	Danish Abrar	Indian National Congress
2023	Kirodi Lal Meena	Bharatiya Janata Party

== Election results ==
=== 2023 ===
2023 Rajasthan Legislative Assembly election: Sawai Madhopur
Party	Candidate	Votes	%	±%
BJP	Kirodi Lal Meena	81,087	44.04	+7.08
INC	Danish Abrar	58,577	31.81	−20.55
Independent	Asha Meena	36,251	19.69	
NOTA	None of the above	1,470	0.8	+0.31
Majority		22,510	12.23	−3.17
Turnout		184,128	71.77	+2.51
BJP gain from INC		Swing		

=== 2018 ===
Rajasthan Legislative Assembly Election, 2018: Sawai Madhopur
Party	Candidate	Votes	%	±%
INC	Danish Abrar	85,655	52.36	
BJP	Asha Meena	60,456	36.96	
Independent	Rajesh Goyal	5,941	3.63	
CPI	Kalu Ram Meena	2,909	1.78	
BSP	Hansraj	2,489	1.52	
NOTA	None of the above	794	0.49	
Majority		25,199	15.4	
Turnout		163,584	69.26	
INC gain from BJP		Swing		

=== 2013 ===
Rajasthan Legislative Assembly Election, 2013: Sawai Madhopur
Party	Candidate	Votes	%	±%
BJP	Diya Kumari	57,384	37.28	
NPP	Kirodi Lal Meena	49,852	32.38	
INC	Danish Abrar	39,187	25.46	
Bharatiya Janta Dal	Ajay Sharma	1,576	1.02	
Independent	Ramawtar Nama	1,532	1.00	
CPI	Dinesh	1,163	0.76	
BSP	Hari Prasad Yogi	984	0.64	
Bharatiya Yuva Shakti	Ramprakash	597	0.39	
Bharatiya Bahujan Party	Ashok	512	0.33	
Independent	Ramavtar Saini	464	0.30	
Independent	Chetan Kumar	375	0.24	
Independent	Ashok Kumar Sahu	295	0.19	
NOTA	None of the Above	1,759		
Rejected ballots		17		
Majority				
Turnout				
BJP gain from INC		Swing		

=== 2008 ===
Rajasthan Legislative Assembly Election, 2008: Sawai Madhopur
Party	Candidate	Votes	%	±%
INC	Alauddin Azad	37,952	34.24	
Independent	Kirori Lal	37,912	34.23	
BJP	Jaskaur	18,970	17.12	
Independent	Lokendra	6,377	5.75	
BSP	Bharat Singh	5,123	4.62	
Independent	Suresh Chand	1,743	1.57	
Independent	Surendra	1,315	1.19	
Independent	Prahalad	1,119	1.01	
Independent	Ramswroop	610	0.55	
Independent	Shafeeq Ahmed	454	0.41	
Independent	Chetan Kumar	426	0.38	
Independent	Satyanarayan	414	0.37	
SP	Sattar	357	0.32	
Independent	Rajeshwar Singh	335	0.30	
BBP	Ramesh	276	0.25	
Independent	Banshi Lal	187	0.17	
Independent	Moti Lal	176	0.16	
NOTA	None of the Above			
Majority				
Turnout		1,10,832	61.0	
INC gain from BJP		Swing		

=== 2003 ===
Rajasthan Legislative Assembly Election, 2003: Sawai Madhopur
Party	Candidate	Votes	%	±%
BJP	Kirodi Lal Meena	71,574	57.52	
INC	Yasmin Abrar	41,488	33.34	
Rajasthan Samajik Nyaya Manch	Bharat Singh	3,944	3.17	
INLD	Motilal	3,186	2.56	
CPI	Ram Gopal	1,428	1.15	
Independent	Ram Prakash Bairwa	1,174	0.94	
NCP	Manphool Meena	751	0.60	
SP	Sattar	359	0.29	
SS	Bansi Lal Meena	332	0.27	
Independent	Dilip Kumar	203	0.16	
NOTA	None of the Above			
Majority				
Turnout				
BJP gain from INC		Swing		

=== 1998 ===
Rajasthan Legislative Assembly Election, 1998: Sawai Madhopur
Party	Candidate	Votes	%	±%
INC	Yasmin Abrar	39,803	40.74	
BJP	Narendra Kanwar	27,203	27.85	
JD	Moti Lal	23,686	24.25	
Independent	Fateh Singh	2,631	2.69	
BSP	Ram Swaroop/Hazari Lal	1,186	1.21	
Independent	Prahlad Narayan	626	0.64	
Independent	P. C. Brahma	616	0.63	
Independent	Shyam Sunder	392	0.40	
Independent	Ravi Shankar	336	0.34	
SAP	Satish Chandra	326	0.33	
Independent	Manphool	290	0.30	
SP	Sattar	215	0.22	
Independent	Ras Bihari	208	0.21	
Independent	Ramavatar	87	0.09	
Independent	Ram Swaroop/Bajrang Lal	85	0.09	
NOTA	None of the Above			
Majority				
Turnout				

== See also ==
- List of constituencies of the Rajasthan Legislative Assembly
- Sawai Madhopur district
