= Kirodi Lal Meena =

Indian politician (born 1951)

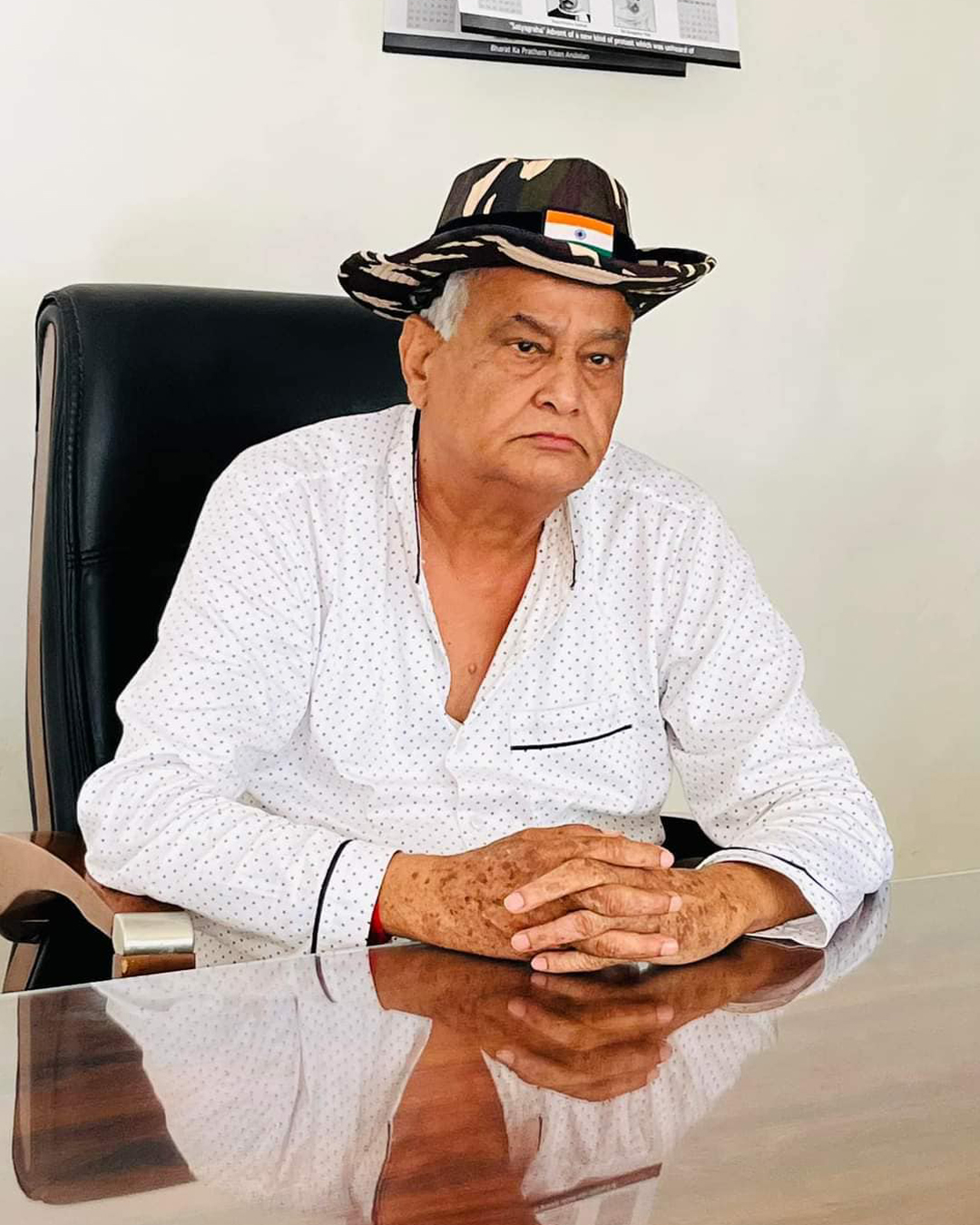

Cabinet Minister, Government of Rajasthan
- Incumbent
- Assumed office 30 December 2023
- Governor: Kalraj Mishra
- Chief Minister: Bhajan Lal Sharma
- Ministry and Departments: List: * Agriculture & Horticulture; Rural Development; Disaster Management, Relief & Civil Defense; Public Charge Resolution
- Preceded by: Lalchand Kataria
- In office December 2003 – December 2007
- Chief Minister: Vasundhara Raje
- Ministry and Departments: List: * Food & Civil Supplies; Disaster Management & Assistance; Labor & Planning

Member of the Rajasthan Legislative Assembly
- Incumbent
- Assumed office 6 December 2023
- Preceded by: Danish Abrar
- Constituency: Sawai Madhopur
- In office 2013–2018
- Preceded by: Parsadi Lal Meena
- Succeeded by: Parsadi Lal Meena
- Constituency: Lalsot
- In office December 2008 – 2013
- Constituency: Todabhim
- In office 2003–2008
- Constituency: Sawai Madhopur
- In office 1998–2003
- Constituency: Bamanwas
- In office 1985–1990
- Preceded by: Hari Singh Mahua
- Succeeded by: Hari Singh Mahua
- Constituency: Mahuwa

Member of Parliament, Rajya Sabha
- In office 4 April 2018 – 6 December 2023
- Preceded by: Narendra Budania, INC
- Succeeded by: Madan Rathore
- Constituency: Rajasthan

Member of Parliament, Lok Sabha
- In office 2009 – 18 May 2014
- Preceded by: Sachin Pilot
- Succeeded by: Harish Chandra Meena
- Constituency: Dausa
- In office 2 December 1989 – 13 March 1991
- Preceded by: Ram Kumar Meena
- Succeeded by: Kunji Lal Meena
- Constituency: Sawai Madhopur

Personal details
- Born: 3 November 1951 (age 74) Khohra, Rajasthan, India
- Party: Bharatiya Janata Party
- Other political affiliations: National People's Party (India)
- Spouse: Golma Devi Meena
- Parent: Father : Manohar Lal Meena Mother: Phoola Devi
- Education: Bachelor of Medicine, Bachelor of Surgery
- Alma mater: Sardar Patel Medical College, Bikaner
- Occupation: MLA
- Profession: Doctor; Agriculture

Kirodi Lal Meena (born 3 November 1951) is an Indian politician, and physician. He is currently serving as cabinet minister in Bhajan Lal Sharma ministry. He is known for his influence in eastern Rajasthan’s tribal communities, particularly the Meena community. A member of the Bharatiya Janata Party (BJP), he currently serves as the cabinet minister of Agriculture, Horticulture, and Rural Development in the Government of Rajasthan and represents the Sawai Madhopur constituency as a member of the Rajasthan Legislative Assembly (MLA). With a political career spanning decades, Meena has been elected as an MLA six times and as a Member of Parliament (MP) twice in the Lok Sabha (9th and 15th terms) from Sawai Madhopur and Dausa, alongside Rajya Sabha from 2018 to 2023. He is known as “Baba” among his supporters.

In the early 1990s, the Meena High Court was formed after large gatherings led by Meena created a permanent venue for assembly.

== Personal life ==
Kirodi Lal Meena was born on 3 November 1951 in a simple farmer family in Dausa district of Rajasthan. His father’s name was Manohar Lal Meena and his mother’s name was Phoola Devi. His father was a farmer by profession.He is married to Golma Devi, a politician who served as an MLA and minister in the Rajasthan Government. The couple is influential in regional politics, particularly among the Meena community.

== Political career ==
Meena contested the 2013 Rajasthan Assembly elections under the National People’s Party and won from Lalsot.

On 24 December 2017, Kirodi Lal Meena was arrested along with some of his supporters for attempting to enter a private temple in Sankhwali against the wishes of the community members.

== Positions held ==
From	To	Position
1985	1988	Member, 8th Legislative Assembly of Rajasthan
1989	1991	Member, 9th Lok Sabha
1998	2003	Member, 11th Legislative Assembly of Rajasthan
2003	2008	Member, 12th Legislative Assembly of Rajasthan
2008	2013	Member, 13th Legislative Assembly of Rajasthan
2009	2014	Member, 15th Lok Sabha
2013	2018	Member, 14th Legislative Assembly of Rajasthan
2018	2023	Member, Rajya Sabha
2023	present	Member, 16th Legislative Assembly of Rajasthan
