= Abhipur Mullahpur =

Abhipur Mullapur Abhaipur
- Village
- Location within Uttar Pradesh Location within India
- Coordinates: 28°28′40″N 79°41′08″E
- Country: India
- State: Uttar Pradesh
- District: Bareilly
- Established: 1556
- Founded by: Amaan Ullaah (Mullah Aman ullah)

Population (census 2011)
  - Total: 835

Languages
  - Official: Hindi
- Time zone: UTC+5:30 (IST)
- PIN: 262406
- Nearest city: Nawabganj, Bareilly, Bisalpur
- Literacy: 65%
- cold: cold (Köppen)

Abhipur Muillahpur is a village in Nawabganj tehsil in Bareilly district, Uttar Pradesh, India. This village has a total population of 835 people out of which 411 are males while 424 are females.
