= Bandikui Assembly constituency =

Legislative Assembly constituency in Rajasthan State, India

Coordinates: 27.05°N 76.57°E

Bandikui
- Constituency No. 85 for the Rajasthan Legislative Assembly

Constituency details
- Country: India
- Region: North India
- State: Rajasthan
- District: Dausa
- Lok Sabha constituency: Dausa
- Established: 1951
- Total electors: 222,388
- Reservation: None

Member of Legislative Assembly
- 16th Rajasthan Legislative Assembly
- Incumbent Bhagchand Saini Tankda
- Party: BJP
- Elected year: 2023

Bandikui Assembly constituency is one of the 200 Legislative Assembly constituencies of Rajasthan state in India.

It is part of Dausa district.

== Members of the Legislative Assembly ==
Year	Member	Party
1951	Bishambher Nath Joshi	Indian National Congress
1957	Bishambher Nath Joshi	Indian National Congress
1962	Mathuresh Behari	Swatantra Party
1967	Bishambher Nath Joshi	Indian National Congress
1972	Bishambher Nath Joshi	Indian National Congress
1977	Vijay Singh Nandera	Janata Party
1980	Nathu Singh	Bharatiya Janata Party
1985	Chandra Shekhar Sharma	Indian National Congress
1990	Ramkishor Shaini	Bharatiya Janata Party
1993	Shailendra Joshi	Indian National Congress
1998	Shailendra Joshi	Indian National Congress
2003	Murari Lal Meena	Bahujan Samaj Party
2008	Ram Kishor Saini	Independent
2013	Alka Gurjar	Bharatiya Janata Party
2018	Gajraj Khatana	Indian National Congress
2023	Bhagchand Saini Tankda	Bharatiya Janata Party

== Election results ==
=== 2023 ===
Rajasthan Legislative Assembly Election, 2023: Bandikui
Party	Candidate	Votes	%	±%
BJP	Bhagchand Saini Tankda	92,067	51.27	+18.9
INC	Gajraj Khatana	79,687	44.38	+9.02
BSP	Bhagwan Singh Mall	3,308	1.84	−26.35
NOTA	None of the above	980	0.55	−0.09
Majority		12,380	6.89	+3.9
Turnout		179,566	80.74	+2.4
BJP gain from INC		Swing		

=== 2018 ===
Rajasthan Legislative Assembly Election, 2018: Bandikui
Party	Candidate	Votes	%	±%
INC	Gajraj Khatana	56,433	35.36	
BJP	Ram Kishor Saini	51,669	32.37	
BSP	Bhagchand Saini	44,992	28.19	
NOTA	None of the above	1,021	0.64	
Majority		4,764	2.99	
Turnout		159,603	78.34	

== See also ==
- List of constituencies of the Rajasthan Legislative Assembly
- Dausa district
