= Nathu Singh =

Nathu Singh may refer to:

- Nathu Singh (cricketer) (born 1995), Indian cricketer
- Nathu Singh Gurjar (born 1951), Indian politician
- Nathu Singh Rathore (1900–?), Indian Army officer
