= Abdullapur Mafi =

- Village
- Location within Uttar Pradesh Location within India
- Coordinates: 28°28′39″N 79°48′08″E
- Country: India
- State: Uttar Pradesh
- District: Bareilly
- Established: 1556
- Founded by: Amaan Ullaah (Mullah Aman ullah)

Population (census 2011)
  - Total: 835

Languages
  - Official: Hindi
- Time zone: UTC+5:30 (IST)
- PIN: 243006
- Nearest city: Nawabganj, Bareilly, Bisalpur

Abdullapur Mafi is a village in Bithiri Chainpur block in Bareilly district, Uttar Pradesh, India.
