= Mahuwa Assembly constituency =

Legislative assembly constituency in Rajasthan, India

Coordinates: 26°N 75.68°E

Mahuwa
- Constituency No. 86 for the Rajasthan Legislative Assembly

Constituency details
- Country: India
- Region: North India
- State: Rajasthan
- District: Dausa
- Lok Sabha constituency: Dausa
- Established: 1951
- Total electors: 221,302
- Reservation: None

Member of Legislative Assembly
- 16th Rajasthan Legislative Assembly
- Incumbent Rajendra Meena
- Party: Bhartiya Janta Party
- Elected year: 2023
- Preceded by: Omprakash Hudla

Mahuwa Assembly constituency is one of the 200 legislative assembly constituencies of Rajasthan state in India. Mahuwa is located in Dausa district.

== Members of the Legislative Assembly ==
| Year | Member | Party |
|---|---|---|
| 1952 | Tika Ram Paliwal | Indian National Congress |
| 1957 | Gopi Sahai | Indian National Congress |
| 1957 | Tika Ram Paliwal | Indian National Congress |
| 1958 (by-poll) | Bhora | Jan Sangh |
| 1959 (by-poll) | C. Chhuttan Lal Meena | Indian National Congress |
| 1962 | Shiv Ram | Jan Sangh |
| 1964 (by-poll) | Mandhata Singh | Swatantra Party |
| 1967 | S. Singh | Indian National Congress |
| 1972 | Vishamber Dayal | Independent |
| 1977 | Umrao Singh | Janata Party |
| 1980 | Hari Singh Mahua | Indian National Congress |
| 1985 | Kirodi Lal Meena | Bhartiya Janata Party |
| 1990 | Hari Singh Mahua | Indian National Congress |
| 1993 | Hari Singh Mahua | Indian National Congress |
| 1998 | Hari Singh Mahua | Indian National Congress |
| 2003 | Harigyan Singh | Bhartiya Janata Party |
| 2008 | Golma Devi Meena | Independent |
| 2013 | Omprakash Hudla | Bhartiya Janata Party |
| 2018 | Omprakash Hudla | Independent |
| 2023 | Rajendra Meena | Bharatiya Janata Party |

== Election results ==
=== 2023 ===
2023 Rajasthan Legislative Assembly election: Mahuwa
| Party | Candidate | Votes | % | ±% |
|---|---|---|---|---|
| BJP | Rajendra Meena | 66,376 | 41.54 | +13.48 |
| INC | Omprakash Hudla | 58,459 | 36.58 | +25.41 |
| ASP(KR) | Mukul Bhadana | 14,861 | 9.3 | |
| Independent | Ramniwas Goyal | 11,008 | 6.89 | |
| Independent | Kamla | 3,125 | 1.96 | |
| BSP | Banwari Lal Santha | 2,737 | 1.71 | −4.69 |
| NOTA | None of the above | 1,133 | 0.71 | −0.04 |
| Majority | | 7,917 | 4.96 | −1.82 |
| Turnout | | 159,798 | 72.21 | −1.63 |
| BJP gain from Independent | | Swing | | |

=== 2018 ===
Rajasthan Legislative Assembly Election, 2018: Mahuwa
| Party | Candidate | Votes | % | ±% |
|---|---|---|---|---|
| Independent | Omprakash Hudla | 51,310 | 34.84 | |
| BJP | Rajendra Meena | 41,325 | 28.06 | |
| Independent | Ajeet Singh | 19,624 | 13.33 | |
| INC | Ajay Kumar | 16,452 | 11.17 | |
| BSP | Vijay Kumar | 9,423 | 6.4 | |
| Nationalist People's Front | Chandra Prakash Meena | 3,964 | 2.69 | |
| NOTA | None of the above | 1,109 | 0.75 | |
| Majority | | 9,985 | 6.78 | |
| Turnout | | 147,260 | 73.84 | |

== See also ==
- List of constituencies of the Rajasthan Legislative Assembly
- Dausa district
