= Dandia Faizulla =

- Village
- Location within Uttar Pradesh
- Coordinates: 28°32′19″N 79°35′42″E
- Country: India
- State: Uttar Pradesh

Population (Census 2011)
  - Total: 940

Languages
  - Official: Hindi
- Time zone: UTC+5:30 (IST)
- PIN: 262406
- Nearest city: Nawabganj, Bareilly, Sitarganj
- Literacy: 67%
- cold: cold (Köppen)

Dandia Faizulla is a village in Nawabganj of Bareilly district, in Uttar Pradesh.
