= Rajendra Meena =

Indian politician

Member of the Rajasthan Legislative Assembly
- Incumbent
- Assumed office 3 December 2023
- Preceded by: Omprakash Hudla
- Constituency: Mahuwa

Personal details
- Born: 15 September 1974 (age 52) Khohra Mulla, Mahwa, Dausa, Rajasthan
- Party: Bhartiya Janta Party
- Spouse: Sunita Meena (m. 2005)
- Relations: Kirodi Lal Meena (uncle) Golma Devi Meena (aunt)
- Education: University of Rajasthan, B.A.
- Occupation: MLA
- Profession: Business

Rajendra Meena (born 15 September 1974) is an Indian politician serving as a Member of the Rajasthan Legislative Assembly. From Mahuwa, he is Member of the Bhartiya Janta Party.
