= Omprakash Hudla =

Indian politician (born 1972)

Member of the Rajasthan Legislative Assembly
- In office 2013–2023
- Succeeded by: Rajendra Meena
- Constituency: Mahuwa
- Preceded by: Golma Devi Meena

Personal details
- Born: 15 June 1972 (age 53) Hudla, Dausa
- Party: Indian National Congress (2023–present)
- Other political affiliations: Bhartiya Janata Party (2013-2018)
- Spouse: Prem Prakash
- Parents: Shivcharan Meena (father); Mishri Devi Meena (mother)

Omprakash Hudla (born 15 June 1972) is an Indian politician. He has been a member of the Rajasthan Legislative Assembly 14th and 15th from the Mahuwa Assembly constituency. He is a member of the Indian National Congress.
