= Bassi Assembly constituency =

Legislative Assembly constituency in Rajasthan State, India

Coordinates: 26.85°N 76.05°E

Bassi
- Constituency No. 57 for the Rajasthan Legislative Assembly

Constituency details
- Country: India
- Region: North India
- State: Rajasthan
- District: Jaipur
- Lok Sabha constituency: Dausa
- Established: 1972
- Total electors: 234,748
- Reservation: ST

Member of Legislative Assembly
- 16th Rajasthan Legislative Assembly
- Incumbent Laxman Meena
- Party: Indian National Congress

Bassi Assembly constituency is one of the 200 Legislative Assembly constituencies of Rajasthan state in India.

It is part of Jaipur district and is reserved for candidates belonging to the Scheduled Tribes.

== Members of the Legislative Assembly ==
Year	Member	Party
1985	Jagdish Prasad Tiwari	Indian National Congress
1990	Kanhaiya Lal Meena	Independent
1993	Kanhaiya Lal Meena	Bharatiya Janata Party
1998	Kanhaiya Lal Meena	Bharatiya Janata Party
2003	Kanhaiya Lal Meena	Bharatiya Janata Party
2008	Anju Devi Dhanka	Independent
2013	Anju Devi Dhanka	Independent
2018	Laxman Meena	Independent
2023	Laxman Meena	Indian National Congress

== Election results ==
=== 2023 ===
2023 Rajasthan Legislative Assembly election: Bassi
Party	Candidate	Votes	%	±%
INC	Laxman Meena	88,043	47.37	+38.11
BJP	Chandramohan Meena	81,729	43.97	+21.98
Independent	Jitendra Meena	9,564	5.15	
NOTA	None of the above	1,411	0.76	−0.16
Majority		6,314	3.4	−21.94
Turnout		185,872	79.18	−1.57
INC gain from Independent		Swing		

=== 2018 ===
Rajasthan Legislative Assembly Election, 2018: Bassi
Party	Candidate	Votes	%	±%
Independent	Laxman Meena	79,878	47.33	
BJP	Kanhaiyalal	37,114	21.99	
Independent	Anju Devi Dhanka	25,207	14.94	
INC	Daulat Singh Meena	15,626	9.26	
Independent	Avanti Meena	2,197	1.3	
BSP	Rakesh Kumar	1,994	1.18	
NOTA	None of the above	1,558	0.92	
Majority		42,764	25.34	
Turnout		168,758	80.75	

== See also ==
- List of constituencies of the Rajasthan Legislative Assembly
- Jaipur district
