= Dausa Assembly constituency =

Legislative Assembly constituency in Rajasthan State, India

Coordinates: 26.9°N 76.34°E

Dausa
- Constituency No. 88 for the Rajasthan Legislative Assembly

Constituency details
- Country: India
- Region: North India
- State: Rajasthan
- District: Dausa
- Lok Sabha constituency: Dausa
- Established: 1957
- Total electors: 225,285
- Reservation: None

Member of Legislative Assembly
- 16th Rajasthan Legislative Assembly
- Incumbent Deen Dayal Bairwa
- Party: Indian National Congress
- Elected year: 2024
- Preceded by: Murari Lal Meena

Dausa Assembly constituency is one of the 200 Legislative Assembly constituencies of Rajasthan state in India. It is part of Dausa district.

== Members of the Legislative Assembly ==
Year	Member	Party
1957	Ram Dhan	Independent
1962	Mool Chand	Swatantra Party
1967	Doongaram	Swatantra Party
1972	Mool Chand Samaria	Swatantra Party
1977	Mool Chand Samaria	Janata Party
1980	Sohan Lal Bansiwal	Bhartiya Janata Party
1985	Bhudar Mal	Indian National Congress
1990	Jia Lal Banshiwal	Bhartiya Janata Party
1993	Jeeyalal Bansiwal	Bhartiya Janata Party
1998	Nand Lal	Independent
2003	Nand Lal Banshiwal	Bhartiya Janata Party
2008	Murari Lal Meena	Bahujan Samaj Party
2013	Shankar Lal Sharma	Bhartiya Janata Party
2018	Murari Lal Meena	Indian National Congress
2023	Murari Lal Meena	Indian National Congress
2024	Deen Dayal Bairwa	Indian National Congress

== Election results ==
=== 2024 bypoll ===
2024 by-election: Dausa
Party	Candidate	Votes	%	±%
INC	Deen Dayal Bairwa	75,536	49.15	▼8.33
BJP	Jagmohan Meena	73,236	47.65	▲19.75
NOTA	None of the Above	908	0.59	
Majority		2,300	1.50	
Turnout				
INC hold		Swing		

=== 2023 ===
2023 Rajasthan Legislative Assembly election: Dausa
Party	Candidate	Votes	%	±%
INC	Murari Lal Meena	98,238	53.81	−3.67
BJP	Shankar Lal Sharma	67,034	36.72	+8.82
ASP(KR)	Radhe Shyam Meena	11,751	6.44	
BSP	Rameshwar Prasad Gurjar	1,742	0.95	
NOTA	None of the above	1,350	0.74	−0.15
Majority		31,204	17.09	−12.49
Turnout		182,550	74.97	−4.11
INC hold		Swing		

=== 2018 ===
2018 Rajasthan Legislative Assembly election: Dausa
Party	Candidate	Votes	%	±%
INC	Murari Lal Meena	99,004	57.48	
BJP	Shankar Lal Sharma	48,056	27.9	
Independent	Nand Lal Bansiwal	18,847	10.94	
NOTA	None of the above	1,529	0.89	
Majority		50,948	29.58	
Turnout		172,247	79.08	
INC gain from BJP		Swing	+11.32	

== See also ==
- List of constituencies of the Rajasthan Legislative Assembly
- Dausa district
