= Ladpur Usmanpur =

- Village
- Location within Uttar Pradesh Location within India
- Coordinates: 28°31′15″N 79°34′35″E
- Country: India
- State: Uttar Pradesh
- District: Bareilly
- Founder: Syed Faiz ullah
- Named for: Syed Lad & Usman e Haidari
- Elevation: 182 m (597 ft)

Population (Census 2011)
  - Total: 4,576

Languages
  - Official: Hindi,
- Time zone: UTC+5:30 (IST)
- PIN: 243407
- Nearest city: Nawabganj, Bareilly
- Literacy: 46%
- Climate: cold (Köppen)

Ladpur Usmanpur is a village in Nawabganj tehsil in Bareilly district, Uttar Pradesh, India.
