= Jhamarwada =

Jhamarwara
- village
- Location in Rajasthan, India Jhamarwara (India)
- Coordinates: 26.92°N 76.35°E
- Country: India
- State: Rajasthan
- District: Dausa
- Elevation: 327 m (1,073 ft)

Population (2001)
  - Total: 5,600

Languages
  - Official: Hindi
- Time zone: UTC+5:30 (IST)
- ISO 3166 code: RJ-IN
- Website: www.dausa.rajasthan.gov.in

Jhamarwara is a village in Dausa district of Rajasthan, India.

It is 55 km from the state capital Jaipur and 240 km from Delhi. The principal occupation of most of its residents is farming.

In April 2015, Nangal Jhamarwara reached infamy due to the death ofresident farmer Gajender Singh Kalyanwat, during a political rally in Delhi. The resultant national furore on the media brought attention to the larger issue of farmer suicides during the last decade in India due to the agrarian crisis caused because of seed monopolies by companies like Monsanto and the apathy of the central and state governments to this issue.
