= Faizullapur, Uttar Pradesh =

Faizullapur
- Village
- Location within Uttar Pradesh Location within India
- Coordinates: 28°31′12.6″N 79°35′29.0″E
- Country: India
- State: Uttar Pradesh
- District: Bareilly
- Founded by: Syed Faiz ullaah

Population (Census 2011)
  - Total: 1,374

Languages
  - Official: Hindi
- Time zone: UTC+5:30 (IST)
- Nearest city: Nawabganj, Bareilly
- Literacy: 63%
- cold: cold (Köppen)

Faizullapur is a village in Nawabganj Bareilly district, Uttar Pradesh.
