= Nangal Rajawatan =

Tehsil in Dausa (Rajasthan), India

- tehsil
- Location in Rajasthan, India
- Coordinates: 26.7486293°N 76.3272785°E
- Country: India
- State: Rajasthan
- District: Dausa
- Designated: 31 May 2012
- Elevation: 327 m (1,073 ft)

Population (2011)
  - Total: 22,839

Languages
  - Official: Hindi
- Time zone: UTC+5:30 (IST)
- PIN: 303505

Nangal Rajawatan is a tehsil (administrative area) in Dausa district in the state of Rajasthan, India. The tehsil had a population of 22,839 in 2011, spread over 256 villages. The town of Nangal Rajawatan is located 18 kilometres (11 mi) south of the district headquarters of Dausa, and 63 kilometres (39 mi) from the state capital of Jaipur. Nangal Rajawatan's postal index number is 303505 and its postal head office is Nangal Rajawatan town. Nangal Rajawatan became a tehsil by notification of the Government of Rajasthan on 31 May 2012.

== Demographics ==
According to the 2011 census, Nangal Rajawatan Tehsil had a population of 22,839. Its literacy rate was higher than the state average, 69.72% compared to 66.11% for Rajasthan as a whole. Male literacy was 83.95% while the female literacy rate was 54.32%. The population of children aged 0–6 was 16.27% of the total population of the tehsil. The sex ratio was 911, which is lower than Rajasthan state average of 928. Child Sex Ratio for the Nangal Rajawatan as per census is 841, lower than Rajasthan average of 888.

== Administration ==
Nangal Rajawatan became a tehsil by notification of the Government of Rajasthan on 31 May 2012. As per the Constitution of India and the Panchyati Raj Act, Nangal Rajawatan Tehsil is administrated by a sarpanch (village head) who is elected to represent the village. The tehsil includes 256 villages.

=== Villages ===
Villages in Nangal Rajawatan Tehsil

Sl No	Village name	Tehsil code
1	Abhaipura	078657
2	Achhiwas	078460
3	Akhepura	078447
4	Alooda	078581
5	Alooda Khurd	078580
6	Amtera	078570
7	Anandpura	078591
8	Atta Bilori	078549
9	Bagpura	078656
10	Baijwari	078659
11	Bairawas	078494
12	Bairawas	078573
13	Bal Kishan Ka Bas	078565
14	Balawas	078674
15	Bane Ka Barkhera	078492
16	Banetha	078483
17	Baniyana	078532
18	Banri	078673
19	Bapi	078472
20	Baragaon	078585
21	Bardakho	078676
22	Barh Bidarkha	078624
23	Barh Chandrana	078514
24	Barh Chhangala	078469
25	Barh Dausa	078504
26	Barh Ki Dhani	078658
27	Barh Rajdhar	078434
28	Barh Sawaipura	078653
29	Barkhera	078513
30	Baroli	078450
31	Basadi Kalan	078424
32	Basadi Khurd	078426
33	Basna	078576
34	Beeghawas	078537
35	Beer Lawan	078596
36	Bhaglai	078553
37	Bhaglao	078558
38	Bhaiyapura	078431
39	Bhandana	078517
40	Bhandarej	078550
41	Bhankhrota	078498
42	Bhankri	078499
43	Bhedoli	078455
44	Bheekali	078551
45	Bhoodlya Bhootpura	078610
46	Bidarkha	078626
47	Biharipura	078476
48	Binawala	078427
49	Birasna	078563
50	Bishanpura	078448
51	Boontoli	078587
52	Boroda	078423
53	Brahamano Ka Bas	078569
54	Chaina Ka Bas	078566
55	Chainpura	078470
56	Chak Bhaglai	078556
57	Chak Chhareda	078665
58	Chak Dehlas	078621
59	Chak Dharanwas	078530
60	Chak Habibwala	078433
61	Chak Harpatti	078614
62	Chak Jagrampura	078618
63	Chak Jasota	078505
64	Chak Kalikhar	078664
65	Chak Khanpura	078597
66	Chak Rampura	078523
67	Chak Sahaspur	078669
68	Chandrana	078477
69	Chawand	078538
70	Chawandeda	078509
71	Chharera	078655
72	Chordi	078445
73	Chuchariya Ka Was	078554
74	Churiyawas	078647
75	Dadanka	078446
76	Daglao	078542
77	Dagolai	078578
78	Dalelpura	078521
79	Dantli	078464
80	Dausa (M)	800511
81	Dausa Khurd (Rural)	078500
82	Dausa(Rural)	078501
83	Dehlari	078584
84	Dehlas	078622
85	Deori	078598
86	Dewanwara	078571
87	Dhai	078474
88	Dhakawas	078641
89	Dhani Jama	078456
90	Dhani Kothya	078644
91	Dharampura	078449
92	Dharanwas	078671
93	Dharanwas	078526
94	Dharasooti	078601
95	Dhigariya	078531
96	Dublya	078617
97	Dugrawata	078615
98	Ganeshpura	078547
99	Ganglyawas	078539
100	Gaonli	078604
101	Garh	078583
102	Girdharpura	078625
103	Googolao	078529
104	Gothra	078564
105	Gurha Keeratwas	078602
106	Gurki	078436
107	Habibwala	078435
108	Hajya Ka Bas	078485
109	Hapawas	078672
110	Haripura	078507
111	Hariyana @ Harinathpura	078606
112	Harpatti	078620
113	Hingotiya	078535
114	Hodayli	078468
115	Itarda	078579
116	Jagrampura	078619
117	Jagsahaipura	078609
118	Jailampura	078611
119	Jaipura	078491
120	Jairampura	078533
121	Jaisinghpura	078557
122	Jaitpura	078649
123	Jasota	078482
124	Jaun	078668
125	Jhajhrawala	078430
126	Jhera	078475
127	Jhoopariya	078608
128	Jirota Kalan	078520
129	Jirota Khurd	078519
130	Jopara	078461
131	Kableshwar	078444
132	Kalakho	078567
133	Kaleri	078675
134	Kali Pahari	078465
135	Kalikhar	078662
136	Kalota	078458
137	Kandoli	078495
138	Kanpura	078638
139	Kanwarpura	078588
140	Karanpura	078589
141	Khairwal	078516
142	Khandewal	078612
143	Khanpura	078595
144	Khanwas	078613
145	Kharandi	078562
146	Khartala	078429
147	Khatiwali Dhani	078654
148	Khatiyara	078666
149	Khawaraoji	078575
150	Kheenchawas	078493
151	Kherawas	078670
152	Kherawas	078630
153	Kherla Khurd	078536
154	Kherli	078548
155	Khohra Kalan	078463
156	Khohra Khurd	078451
157	Khuri Kalan	078480
158	Khuri Khurd	078481
159	Kishanpura Bara	078623
160	Kishanpura Tapriya	078628
161	Kishorpura	078636
162	Koleshwar Kalan	078440
163	Kolyawas	078634
164	Kota Patti	078590
165	Kundal	078452
166	Lahri Ka Was	078646
167	Lakhan Ka Bas	078648
168	Lawan	078593
169	Lohsari	078459
170	Lotwara	078462
171	Mahansara Khurd (Rural)	078503
172	Maharajpura	078559
173	Mahron Ki Dhani	078438
174	Mahsara Kalan	078484
175	Malagwas	078508
176	Malarna	078524
177	Maliyan Dhani	078443
178	Malpura	078478
179	Malwas	078631
180	Mandera Sunarpura	078607
181	Manga Bhata	078487
182	Manpuria	078643
183	Matwas	078586
184	Mitrapura	078497
185	Mohanpura	078650
186	Mohanpura	078594
187	Moond Ghisya	078574
188	Moonsolai	078605
189	Mora Patti	078510
190	Morasani	078489
191	Motalwas	078545
192	Namolao	078502
193	Nangal Bersi	078515
194	Nangal Chapa	078561
195	Nangal Govind	078528
196	Nangal Rajawatan	078640
197	Nayagaon	078627
198	Neemali	078457
199	Palawas	078490
200	Paparda	078577
201	Parli	078496
202	Peelwa	078437
203	Peepalya Chainpura	078599
204	Pooranwas	078616
205	Prahladpura	078600
206	Prempura	078486
207	Purbiyawas	078592
208	Purohiton Ka Bas	078466
209	Pyariwas	078639
210	Rajpura	078633
211	Rajpura	078488
212	Rajwas	078603
213	Rajwas	078541
214	Ralawata	078543
215	Rambas	078442
216	Ramjipura	078534
217	Rampura @ Maharajpura	078422
218	Rampura Kalan	078552
219	Rampura Khurd	078527
220	Ramsinghpura	078555
221	Ramsinghpura	078663
222	Ramsinghpura	078632
223	Ramthala	078637
224	Raniwas	078540
225	Raniwas	078645
226	Raypur	078511
227	Rohara	078506
228	Roogali	078512
229	Rudmal Ka Bas	078568
230	Rughnathpura	078544
231	Sabalpura	078522
232	Sahaspur	078661
233	Sainthal	078432
234	Sar	078677
235	Sarai	078572
236	Sawaipura	078651
237	Seemalki	078518
238	Seengpura	078467
239	Seengpura	078660
240	Shekhpura	078635
241	Shivrampura	078471
242	Shri Madhogovindpura	078428
243	Shyalawas	078560
244	Sindoli	078453
245	Singwara	078525
246	Sitapura	078479
247	Sudarshanpura	078473
248	Surajpura	078546
249	Talawada	078454
250	Teentoli	078642
251	Thikariya	078582
252	Thoomri	078667
253	Titarwara Kalan	078441
254	Titarwara Khurd	078439
255	Todarwas	078629
256	Udaipura	078652
