= Palanhera =

Village in Rajasthan, India

Palanhera is a small village in Mahwa Tehsil in Dausa district of Rajasthan State, India. It comes under Palan Hera Panchayath. It belongs to Jaipur Division . It is located 77 KM towards East from District head quarters Dausa. 7 KM from Mahwa. 135 KM from State capital Jaipur.

== Etymology ==
The name of Palanhera is widely believed by the local villagers to have originated from the Rajput Chauhan, who emerged victorious over the Jats during the 18th century.
