= Kherla =

Kherla or Kherlá may refer to several places within the Republic of India:

- Kherla, Madhya Pradesh, a town near Betul, Madhya Pradesh
- Kingdom of Kherla, a medieval and early modern Gond kingdom based there
- Kherla Sarkar, a former name of Betul District
- Kherla, Haryana
- Kherla Bujurg, Rajasthan
- Kherla Gadali, Rajasthan
