= Alka Gurjar =

Indian politician

Member of Parliament, Rajya Sabha
- Incumbent
- Assumed office 21 June 2026
- Preceded by: Ravneet Singh Bittu
- Constituency: Rajasthan

Member of Rajasthan Legislative Assembly
- In office 2013–2018
- Preceded by: Ram Kishore Saini
- Succeeded by: Gajraj Khatana
- Constituency: Bandikui

National General Secretary of Bharatiya Janata Party
- In office Incumbent

Personal details
- Born: February 21, 1961 (age 65) Malpura, Rajasthan, India
- Party: Bharatiya Janata Party
- Spouse: Nathu Singh Gurjar
- Occupation: Politician

Alka Gurjar (born 21 February 1961) is an Indian politician who has been elected for Rajya Sabha in June 2026..

She is currently serving as the National General Secretary of the Bharatiya Janata Party (BJP). She is also the Co-incharge of the BJP in Delhi.

Gurjar was elected to the Rajasthan Legislative Assembly in 2013 from the Bandikui Assembly constituency and served as an MLA until 2018.

== Early life and education ==
Gurjar was born on 21 February 1961 in Malpura, Rajasthan. She holds degrees in M.A., L.L.M., and Ph.D. She was selected for the Rajasthan Administrative Service and completed training, but chose not to join government service and instead pursued a political career. She is married to Nathu Singh Gurjar, a BJP leader and former Cabinet Minister in the Government of Rajasthan.

== Political career ==
In the 2013 elections, she was elected as the MLA from Bandikui. She also served as the Spokesperson and Vice President of the BJP in Rajasthan. She was later appointed as the National General Secretary of the Bharatiya Janata Party and is serving since September 2020 and co-incharge of multiple states and UTs like Delhi and Madhya Pradesh. She is a seasoned campaigner having been serving in poll bound states namely West Bengal and Assam.

She was elected for Rajya Sabha in June 2026.
