= Parsadi Lal Meena =

Indian politician (born 1951)

Cabinet Minister of Medical Health and Services Government of Rajasthan
- In office 22 November 2021 – December 2023
- Chief Minister: Ashok Gehlot
- Preceded by: Raghu Sharma
- Succeeded by: Gajendra Singh Khimsar

Cabinet Minister of State Excise Government of Rajasthan
- In office 22 November 2021 – December 2023
- Chief Minister: Ashok Gehlot
- Preceded by: Ashok Gehlot

Cabinet Minister of Industries and State Enterprises Government of Rajasthan
- In office 25 December 2018 – November 2021
- Chief Minister: Ashok Gehlot
- Preceded by: Rajpal Singh Shekhawat

Member of the Rajasthan Legislative Assembly
- In office December 2018 – December 2023
- Preceded by: Kirodi Lal Meena
- Succeeded by: Rambilas Meena
- Constituency: Lalsot
- In office December 2008 – December 2013
- Preceded by: Virendra Meena
- Succeeded by: Kirodi Lal Meena
- Constituency: Lalsot
- In office 1985 – 2003 (4 Times)
- Preceded by: Ram Sahai Sonad
- Succeeded by: Virendra Meena
- Constituency: Lalsot

Cabinet Minister of Cooperative and Food supply Government of Rajasthan
- In office 2008–2013
- Chief Minister: Ashok Gehlot
- Succeeded by: Ajay Singh Kilak
- In office 1998–2003
- Chief Minister: Ashok Gehlot

Personal details
- Born: 1 February 1951 (age 75) Lalsot, Rajasthan, India
- Party: Indian National Congress
- Spouse: Mishri Devi Meena
- Occupation: MLA
- Profession: Politician, Agriculturist

Parsadi Lal Meena (born 1 February 1951) is an Indian politician and Former Cabinet Minister of Health & State Excise in Ashok Gehlot ministry and also member of 8th, 9th, 10th, 11th, 13th and 15th Legislative Assembly of Rajasthan. He also served as Minister of Cooperative and Food Supply for two terms (1998–2003) and (2008–2013). And currently he represents Lalsot Assembly constituency as a member of Indian National Congress.

== Early life and education ==
Meena was born 1 February 1951 in Mandawari village in Lalsot tehsil of Dausa district of Rajasthan to his father Devilal Meena. He married Mishri Devi Meena. In 1967–68, he attended Government Higher Secondary School, Gangapur City and attained Intermediate Certificate.

== Political career ==
Meena was MLA for six terms from Lalsot Assembly as a member of Indian National Congress. From 1985 to 2003, he won four times continuously. In 1998, he was appointed Minister of Cooperative in Government of Rajasthan.

In 13th Legislative Assembly of Rajasthan (2008) elections, he was elected for a fifth time MLA as an Independent candidate defeating Babu Lal Dhanaka (Samajwadi Party) by a margin of 17,005 votes. After being elected MLA he again joined Indian National Congress and was appointed second time Minister of Cooperative and Food Supply (2008–2013) in Government of Rajasthan.

In 14th Legislative Assembly of Rajasthan (2013) elections, he again contested from Lalsot Assembly but lost to Kirodi Lal Meena (National People's Party (India)) by a lowest margin in 2013 Rajasthan Assembly election, only 491 votes.

In 15th Legislative Assembly of Rajasthan (2018) elections, he was elected Member of Legislative Assembly of Lalsot defeating BJP candidate Ram Bilas by a margin of 9,074 votes, and again appointed Cabinet Minister of Industries and State Enterprises in Ashok Gehlot ministry.

== Positions held ==
- 1985–1990, Member of Legislative Assembly in 8th Legislative Assembly of Rajasthan. (First term)
- 1990–1993, Member of Legislative Assembly in 9th Legislative Assembly of Rajasthan. (Second term)
- 1993–1998, Member of Legislative Assembly in 10th Legislative Assembly of Rajasthan. (Third term)
- 1998–2003, Member of Legislative Assembly in 11th Legislative Assembly of Rajasthan. (Fourth term)
  - Cabinet Minister of Cooperative in First Ashok Gehlot ministry.
- 2008–2013, Member of Legislative Assembly in 13th Legislative Assembly of Rajasthan. (Fifth term)
  - Cabinet Minister of Cooperative and food supply in Second Ashok Gehlot ministry.
- 2018–present, Member of Legislative Assembly in 15th Legislative Assembly of Rajasthan. (Sixth term)
  - Cabinet Minister of Industries and State Enterprises in Third Ashok Gehlot ministry.
  - Cabinet minister of health and excise in Ashok Gehlot ministry
