= Rajgarh Laxmangarh Assembly constituency =

Legislative Assembly constituency in Rajasthan State, India

Coordinates: 27.83°N 75.03°E

Rajgarh Laxmangarh
- Constituency No. 68 for the Rajasthan Legislative Assembly

Constituency details
- Country: India
- Region: North India
- State: Rajasthan
- District: Alwar
- Lok Sabha constituency: Alwar
- Established: 2008
- Total electors: 264,846
- Reservation: ST

Member of Legislative Assembly
- 16th Rajasthan Legislative Assembly
- Incumbent Mange Lal Meena
- Party: Indian National Congress
- Elected year: 2023

Rajgarh Laxmangarh Assembly constituency is one of the 200 Legislative Assembly constituencies of Rajasthan state in India. It is in Alwar district and is reserved for candidates belonging to the Scheduled Tribes. It is a segment of Alwar Lok Sabha constituency. It came into existence in 2008 when electoral map of India was redrawn. Until then there was Rajgarh in Rajasthan assembly. See : Lachhmangarh

Rajgarh- Laxmangarh (ST) Assembly constituency Area - 1. Tehsil Rajgarh (Partly) – (I) ILRC Machari (II) ILRC Pinan (III) ILRC Reni (IV) ILRC Dhigawara (V) ILRC Rajgarh (Partly) – (i) Municipal Board Rajgarh (ii) PC Rajgarh-A (iii) PC Rajgarh (B) (iv) PC Alei 2. Tehsil Laxmangarh (Partly) – (I) ILRC Laxmangarh (II) ILRC Bichgaon (III) ILRC Mojpur

== Members of Vidhan Sabha ==
- Before 2008 : Seat did not exist. See : Rajgarh (Rajasthan Vidhan Sabha constituency)

Year	Member	Party
2008	Suraj Bhan Dhanka	Samajwadi Party
2013	Golma Devi Meena	National People's Party
2018	Johari Lal Meena	Indian National Congress
2023	Mangelal Meena	Indian National Congress

== Election results ==
=== 2008 Vidhan Sabha ===
- Suraj Bhan Dhanka (SP) : 45,002 votes
- Johri Lal (INC) : 44,065

=== 2013 Vidhan Sabha ===
- Golma (NPP) : 64,926 votes
- Surajbhan Dhanka (SP) : 56,798

=== 2018 ===
Rajasthan Legislative Assembly Election, 2018: Rajgarh Laxmangarh
Party	Candidate	Votes	%	±%
INC	Johari Lal Meena			
NOTA	None of the Above			
Majority				
Turnout				

== See also ==
- List of constituencies of the Rajasthan Legislative Assembly
- Alwar district
- Rajgarh, Rajasthan
- Rajgarh, Madhya Pradesh
