= Johari Lal Meena =

Member of the Rajasthan Legislative Assembly

Member of the Rajasthan Legislative Assembly
- In office 2018–2023
- Preceded by: Golma Devi Meena
- Succeeded by: Mange Lal Meena
- Constituency: Rajgarh Laxmangarh

Personal details
- Born: 8 May 1940 (age 84); Reni, Alwar, Rajasthan
- Political party: Indian National Congress
- Spouse: Panchi Meena
- Parent: Moharpal Meena (father)

Johari Lal Meena (born 8 May 1940) is an Indian politician. He was elected to the 15th Rajasthan Assembly from Rajgarh Laxmangarh.
