= Bhagchand Saini Tankda =

Indian politician

Member of the Rajasthan Legislative Assembly
- Incumbent
- Assumed office 3 December 2023
- Preceded by: Gajraj Khatana
- Constituency: Bandikui

Personal details
- Born: Gola Ka Bas, Dausa, Rajasthan, India
- Party: Bharatiya Janata Party
- Parent: Bholaram Saini (father)
- Education: B.A.
- Alma mater: Jaipur National University
- Occupation: MLA
- Profession: Agriculture, business, politics

Bhagchand Saini Tankda is an Indian politician from Rajasthan. He is a member of the 16th Rajasthan Legislative Assembly from the Bandikui Assembly constituency representing the Bharatiya Janata Party.

== Early life and education ==
Tankda is from Bandikui, Dausa district, Rajasthan. He is the son of Bholaram Saini. He completed his graduation in arts from Jaipur National University.

== Career ==
Tankda won from the Bandikui Assembly constituency representing the Bharatiya Janata Party in the 2023 Rajasthan Legislative Assembly election. He polled 92,067 votes and defeated his nearest rival, Gajraj Khatana of the Indian National Congress, by a margin of 12,380 votes.

He had earlier contested the 2018 Rajasthan Legislative Assembly election from the same seat as a candidate of the Bahujan Samaj Party (BSP), and in 2013 as a candidate of the Indian National Congress.

== Electoral record ==
=== 2023 Bandikui Assembly Election ===
Candidate	Party	Result	Votes	Vote share
Bhagchand Tankda	Bharatiya Janata Party	Elected	92,067	51.27%
Gajraj Khatana	Indian National Congress	Runner-up	79,687	44.38%
Bhawani Singh Mall	Bahujan Samaj Party	–	3,308	1.84%

=== 2018 Bandikui Assembly Election ===
Candidate	Party	Result	Votes	Vote share
Gajraj Khatana	Indian National Congress	Elected	56,433	35.36%
Ram Kishor Sani	Bharatiya Janata Party	Runner-up	51,669	32.37%
Bhagchand Saini	Bahujan Samaj Party	–	44,992	28.19%
