= Shankar Lal Sharma =

Indian politician

Member of the Rajasthan Legislative Assembly
- In office 2013–2018
- Preceded by: Murari Lal Meena
- Constituency: Dausa Assembly constituency

Personal details
- Party: Bharatiya Janata Party
- Education: B.Com
- Alma mater: Rajasthan University
- Occupation: Politician

Shankar Lal Sharma is an Indian politician. He was elected to the 2013 Rajasthan Legislative Assembly election from Dausa Assembly constituency. He is a member of the Bharatiya Janata Party.
