= Danish Abrar =

Indian politician

Member of the Rajasthan Legislative Assembly
- In office 2018–2023
- Preceded by: Diya Kumari
- Succeeded by: Kirodi Lal Meena
- Constituency: Sawai Madhopur

Danish Abrar (5 January 1984) is an Indian politician. He was elected to the 15th Rajasthan Assembly from Sawai Madhopur. He is a member of the Indian National Congress. He is the son of Abrar Ahmed. He did Bachelor of Commerce from Delhi University in 2005.
