= Golma Devi Meena =

Indian politician

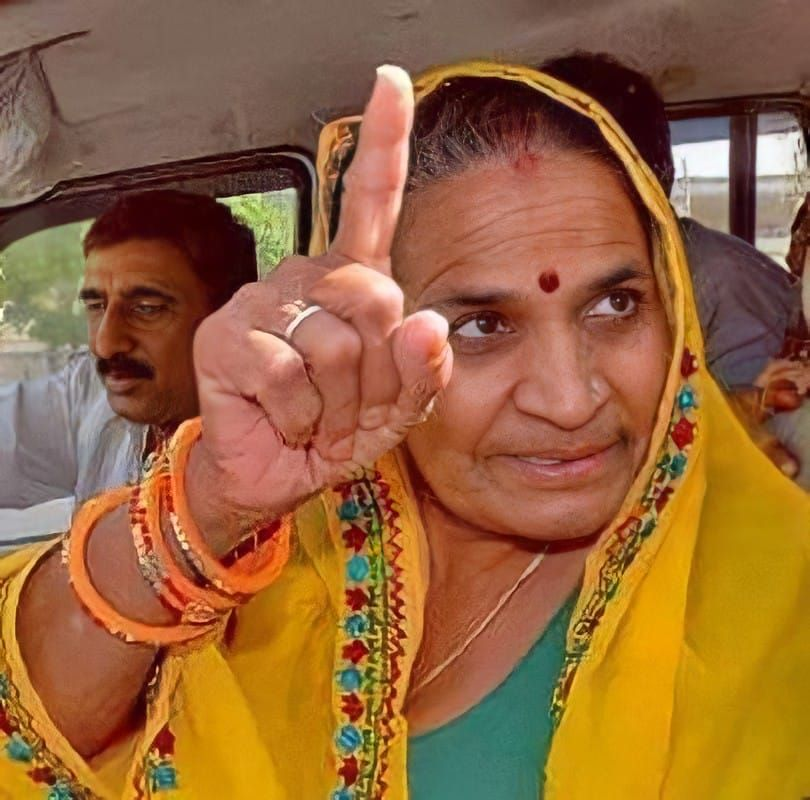

Minister of State for Khadi and Village Industries in Government of Rajasthan
- In office 19 December 2008 - 2 April 2009

Member of the Rajasthan Legislative Assembly
- In office 2013 - 2018
- Preceded by: Suraj Bhan Dhanaka
- Succeeded by: Johari Lal Meena
- Constituency: Rajgarh Laxmangarh, Alwar
- In office 2008 - 2013
- Preceded by: Harigyan Singh
- Succeeded by: Omprakash Hudla
- Constituency: Mahuwa, Dausa

Personal details
- Born: 3 November 1949 (age 76) Khohra, Mahwa
- Party: Bharatiya Janata Party
- Other political affiliations: National People's Party (India)
- Spouse: Kirodi Lal Meena

Golma Devi Meena (born 3 November 1949) is an Indian politician. She briefly served as Minister of State for Khadi and Village Industries in Government of Rajasthan. She was elected to the 13th and 14th Rajasthan Assembly from Mahuwa and Rajgarh Laxmangarh. She won 2008 Rajasthan Assembly elections as Independent while she was a member of National People’s Party in 2013 Rajasthan Assembly elections. She is member of the Bharatiya Janata Party.
