= Abrar Ahmed (INC politician) =

Indian politician

Abrar Ahmed (10 July 1956 - 5 May 2004) was an Indian politician. He served as Member of Rajya Sabha from 3 April 1988 to 2 April 1994 and working president of Rajasthan Pradesh Congress Committee.

== Personal life ==
He was born on 10 July 1956 in Baran, Rajasthan and married Yasmeen Khan on 20 March 1983. The couple had one son and one daughter including Danish Abrar. On 5 May 2004, he died in a car accident.
