= Neemali =

Nimali, Rajasthan, India

Neemali or Nimali is a village as well as a gram panchayat in Dausa District in the State of Rajasthan, India.

Nimali was founded by Neema Singh Gurjar. He belonged to Awana clan of Gurjar community. Nimali is located at a distance of 15 km from the district headquarter of Dausa. According to information from the 2011 census, the location code or village code Nimali is 078457. The postal code Nimali is 303325.

The total geographical area of village is 408.5 hectares. Nimali has a total population of 2,175 peoples. There are about 310 houses in Neemali.100% of the population of Nimali follows Hinduism.An ancient lord Shiva temple is situated in the middle of the village. Apart from this a temple of lord Krishna is also present in the village.Dausa is the nearest town to Nimali.

In Nimali, there was a family of Choudhary who are also known as Jaipuriya because their ancestor named Ramchandra Choudhary was the feudal lord under the king Mansingh Kachhawa. He was sent with the king when he was a teenager because when the king came in his village his family was the son of jamindars in the village and when king entered the village he asked him that with whom permission you entered in the village and asked King why you don't take permission from my family the king was surprised to see the bravery of the child Ramchandra Choudhary and asked about his family and king met his family and asked them to send Ramchandra with him. He offered them some money but they refused to take money and sent the Ramchandra Choudhary with the king and from childhood the Ramchandra Choudhary gave his service to his lord. When the king was got too old he called his favourite person one of them was Ramchandra also king asked once Ramchandra Choudhary do you want something some villages to rule or money because you served me very well and you are an honest person who are with me then choudhary ji said no my lord I don't want any money or land I only want the choudharai of the jaipur villages the king gave him permission to be the choudhary of all the villages nearby jaipur clan . The memorial of Ramchandra Choudhary is located in jaipur near the Sindhi camp. Later on the successor donated 100 acres of land the poor people who worked on their lands from many years and now the land donated converted into a village named Jama near Nimali.
