= Deen Dayal Bairwa =

Indian politician

Member of Rajasthan Legislative Assembly
- Incumbent
- Assumed office 23 November 2024
- Preceded by: Murari Lal Meena
- Constituency: Dausa

Head, Panchayat Samiti Dausa
- In office 2015–2020

Personal details
- Born: 10 January 1976 (age 50) Dodolai Ki Dhani, Jeerota Khurd, Dausa, Rajasthan
- Party: Indian National Congress
- Spouse: Bina Bairwa
- Children: 2
- Parent(s): Kishan Lal Bairwa (father); Rampyari Devi Bairwa (mother)
- Education: B.A.
- Alma mater: University of Rajasthan
- Occupation: MLA
- Profession: Agriculture & Politician

Deen Dayal Bairwa (born 10 January 1976) is an Indian politician currently serving as the 16th Member of the Rajasthan Legislative Assembly. He represents Dausa. He is a member of the Indian National Congress.
