= Kherla Bujurg =

Kherla Bujurg Kherla Bujurg
- village/town
- Location in Rajasthan, India
- Coordinates: 26°55′9″N 76°59′16″E
- Country: India
- State: Rajasthan
- District: Dausa

Government
  - Sarpanch: Mohan Singh
  - Upsarpanch: Pinki Devi

Languages
  - Official: Hindi
- Time zone: UTC+5:30 (IST)
- PIN: 322240
- Telephone code: 07461
- Nearest city: Hindaun City,
- Lok Sabha constituency: Dausa
- Vidhan Sabha constituency: Mahua
- Climate: NORMAL (Köppen)
- Avg. summer temperature: 45 °C (113 °F)
- Avg. winter temperature: 7 °C (45 °F)

Kherla Bujurg is a large village in the Mahwa sub-division of Dausa district in the Indian state of Rajasthan. This town is located on Mahua-Hindaun road, 16 kilometres (9.9 mi) from Mahua. According to the 2011 census it has a population of 4946 living in 898 households. Its main agricultural product is wheat.
