= Kanhaiya Lal Meena =

Indian politician

Member of Rajasthan Legislative Assembly
- In office 1990 – 2008
- Preceded by: Jagdish Prasad Tiwari
- Succeeded by: Anju Devi Dhanka
- Constituency: Bassi

Personal details
- Political party: Bharatiya Janata Party

Kanhaiya Lal Meena is an Indian politician, currently a senior leader of the Bharatiya Janata Party, former Member of the Rajasthan Legislative Assembly from Bassi and candidate of Bharatiya Janata Party from Dausa Lok Sabha constituency in the 2024 Indian general elections.
