= Khawaraoji =

- Village
- Location in Rajasthan Location in India
- Coordinates: 26°46′46″N 76°29′02″E
- Country: India
- State: Rajasthan
- District: Dausa

Population (2011)
  - Total: 7,373
- Time zone: UTC+5:30 (IST)
- PIN: 303506

Khawaraoji is a village located in the Dausa district of the Indian state of Rajasthan.

== Geography ==
Khawaraoji is a village located in the Dausa district of Rajasthan, India. It is known for its beauty and the old kingdom of Chauhans. It is located around 26 km from Dausa.

The village is surrounded by the Aravali hills on one side, and the rest is covered by Khawaraoji Fort. It is known for the red stone which is used in the architecture. Two forts are located in Khawaraoji Village; one on top of the hill and another in the foothills.

Khawaraoji is located near the Golden Tourism triangle of India (Delhi, Jaipur, Agra). The nearest airport is the Jaipur Airport with a travel distance of 86.6 km.

Hapawas and Paparda are nearest village to Khawaraoji.

== Demographics ==
According to the 2011 census, Khawaraoji has a population of 7,373. The overall literacy rate of the village is 58.01% with male literacy of 72.07% and female literacy of 42.69%. Sex Ratio of Khawaraoji village is 908 which is lower than Rajasthan state average of 928.

== Kingdom of Khawaraoji ==
The chauhans era began in the 16th century. 210 villages were under the control of khawaraoji. Khawaraoji is the fief of Thikana during the Rajput period. Rao Vishwak singh chauhan is the current Rao of Khawaraoji.

== Khawaraoji Fort (Hotel Khawa Palace) ==
The old Fort was renovated as a heritage hotel (Hotel Khawa Palace) with ancient architecture and a display of heritage. The fort is located on the upper part of the village. Thakur Karan Singh Rao built this palace in 1653 to rule his Kingdom. The fort is surrounded partly by Amol Ghati, and the rest by mountains that offer a panoramic view.
