= Lalsot Assembly constituency =

Assembly constituency in Rajasthan

Coordinates: 26.55°N 76.33°E

Lalsot
- Constituency No. 89 for the Rajasthan Legislative Assembly

Constituency details
- Country: India
- Region: North India
- State: Rajasthan
- District: Dausa
- Lok Sabha constituency: Dausa
- Established: 1957
- Total electors: 2,25,430
- Reservation: ST

Member of Legislative Assembly
- 16th Rajasthan Legislative Assembly
- Incumbent Rambilas Meena
- Party: Bhartiya Janata Party
- Elected year: 2023

Lalsot Assembly constituency is a constituency of the Rajasthan Legislative Assembly covering the Lalsot Tehsil in the Dausa district of Rajsathan, India. Lalsot is one of eight assembly constituencies in the Dausa (Lok Sabha constituency). Since 2008, this assembly constituency is numbered 89 amongst 200 constituencies.

Currently this seat belongs to Bhartiya Janta party candidate Rambilas Meena who won in last Assembly election of 2023 Rajasthan Legislative Assembly election by defeating Indian National Congress candidate Parsadi Lal Meena by a margin of almost 53000 votes.

== Geographical scope ==
The constituency comprises parts of Tehsil Lalsot.

== Members of the Legislative Assembly ==
Election	Member	Party
1957	Prabhu Lal	Akhil Bharatiya Ram Rajya Parishad
1957	Nathu Lal	Akhil Bharatiya Ram Rajya Parishad
1962	Ram Sahai Sonad	Swatantra Party
1967	Ram Sahai Sonad	Swatantra Party
1972	Meetha Lal	Swatantra Party
1977	Har Sahai	Janata Party
1980	Ram Sahai Sonad	Indian National Congress
1985	Parsadi Lal Meena	Indian National Congress
1990	Parsadi Lal Meena	Indian National Congress
1993	Parsadi Lal Meena	Indian National Congress
1998	Parsadi Lal Meena	Indian National Congress
2003	Virendra Meena	Bharatiya Janata Party
2008	Parsadi Lal Meena	Independent
2013	Kirodi Lal Meena	National People's Party
2018	Parsadi Lal Meena	Indian National Congress
2023	Rambilas Meena	Bharatiya Janata Party

== Election results ==
=== 2023 ===
2023 Rajasthan Legislative Assembly election: Lalsot
Party	Candidate	Votes	%	±%
BJP	Rambilas	120,962	60.77	+14.8
INC	Parsadilal	73,894	37.12	−14.08
NOTA	None of the above	2,419	1.22	+0.07
Majority		47,068	23.65	+18.42
Turnout		199,062	77.98	+1.02
BJP gain from INC		Swing		

=== 2018 ===
In 2018 Rajasthan Legislative Assembly election total 5 candidate filled nomination and Parsadi Lal Meena (Indian National Congress) won the election, he defeated Ram Bilas (BJP) by a margin of 9,074 votes.

2018 Rajasthan Legislative Assembly election: Lalsot
Party	Candidate	Votes	%	±%
INC	Parsadi Lal Meena	88,828	51.2	
BJP	Rambilas Meena	79,754	45.97	
NOTA	None of the above	1,987	1.15	
Majority		9,074	5.23	
Turnout		173,502	76.96	
INC gain from NPP		Swing	▲20.54	

=== 2013 ===
In 2013 Rajasthan Legislative Assembly election total 8 candidate filled nomination and Kirodi Lal Meena (National People's Party (India)) won the election, he defeated Parsadi Lal Meena (Indian National Congress) by a margin of 491 votes.

2013 Rajasthan Legislative Assembly election: Lalsot
Party	Candidate	Votes	%	±%
NPP	Kirodi Lal Meena	43,887	30.66	Steady
INC	Parsadi Lal Meena	43,396	30.31	Steady
BJP	Virendra Meena	33,587	23.46	Steady
Independent	Prahlad Bhamashah	13,013	9.09	Steady
BYSP	Basantilal Meena	1,444	1.01	Steady
Independent	Vijendra Jorwal	1,373	0.96	Steady
BSP	Harinarayan	1,301	0.91	Steady
SP	Babulal Dhanka	1,194	0.83	Steady
NOTA	None Of The Above	3,963	2.77	Steady
Majority		491	0.35	Steady
Turnout		1,43,158	74.01	Steady
NPP gain from Independent		Swing	Steady	
