= Rambilas Meena =

Indian politician

Member of the Rajasthan Legislative Assembly
- Incumbent
- Assumed office 3 December 2023
- Preceded by: Parsadi Lal Meena
- Constituency: Lalsot

Personal details
- Born: 4 August 1976 (age 49) Dungarpur, Dausa district, Rajasthan, India
- Party: Bharatiya Janata Party
- Occupation: MLA
- Profession: Agriculture, business, politician

Rambilas Meena (born 4 August 1976) is an Indian politician and a member of the Bharatiya Janata Party. He was elected to the Rajasthan Legislative Assembly from the Lalsot constituency in the 2023 Rajasthan Legislative Assembly elections, defeating incumbent MLA Parsadi Lal Meena.

He is a first-time MLA and has expressed commitment to tackling corruption in the administrative system.

== Political career ==
Rambilas Meena has been actively involved in regional politics as a member of the Bharatiya Janata Party (BJP), focusing on tribal welfare and rural development in Rajasthan's Dausa district. He first contested the Rajasthan Legislative Assembly elections in 2018 from the Lalsot Assembly constituency, a seat reserved for Scheduled Tribes. Despite a strong campaign, he lost to senior Congress leader Parsadi Lal Meena.

In the 2023 Rajasthan Legislative Assembly elections, he again contested from Lalsot and secured a decisive victory by defeating Parsadi Lal Meena with a margin of over 47,000 votes. This win marked his debut in the state assembly as a first-time MLA.

== Electoral record ==
Election results
Year	Office	Constituency	Candidate (Party)	Votes	%	Opponent (Party)	Opponent Votes	Opponent %	Result	Ref
2023	MLA	Lalsot (ST)	Rambilas Meena (BJP)	1,20,962	60.77	Parsadi Lal Meena (INC)	73,894	37.12	Won	
2018	MLA	Lalsot (ST)	Rambilas Meena (BJP)	79,754	45.97	Parsadi Lal Meena (INC)	88,828	51.20	Lost	
