= Sainthal, Uttar Pradesh =

Sainthal Senthal; Saithal
- Nagar panchayat
- Location within Uttar Pradesh Location within India
- Coordinates: 28°31′40″N 79°34′15″E
- Country: India
- State: Uttar Pradesh
- Founder: Syed Aman-ullah

Government
  - Type: Local Self-Government headed by Chairman
  - Body: Nagar panchayat

Population (2017)
  - Total: 15,632
- Demonym: Sainthali

Languages
  - Official: Hindi and Urdu
- Time zone: UTC+5:30 (IST)
- PIN: 243407
- Nearest city: Bareilly, Pilibhit,
- Literacy: 56.2 % (2011 census of India)
- Climate: Semi Arid

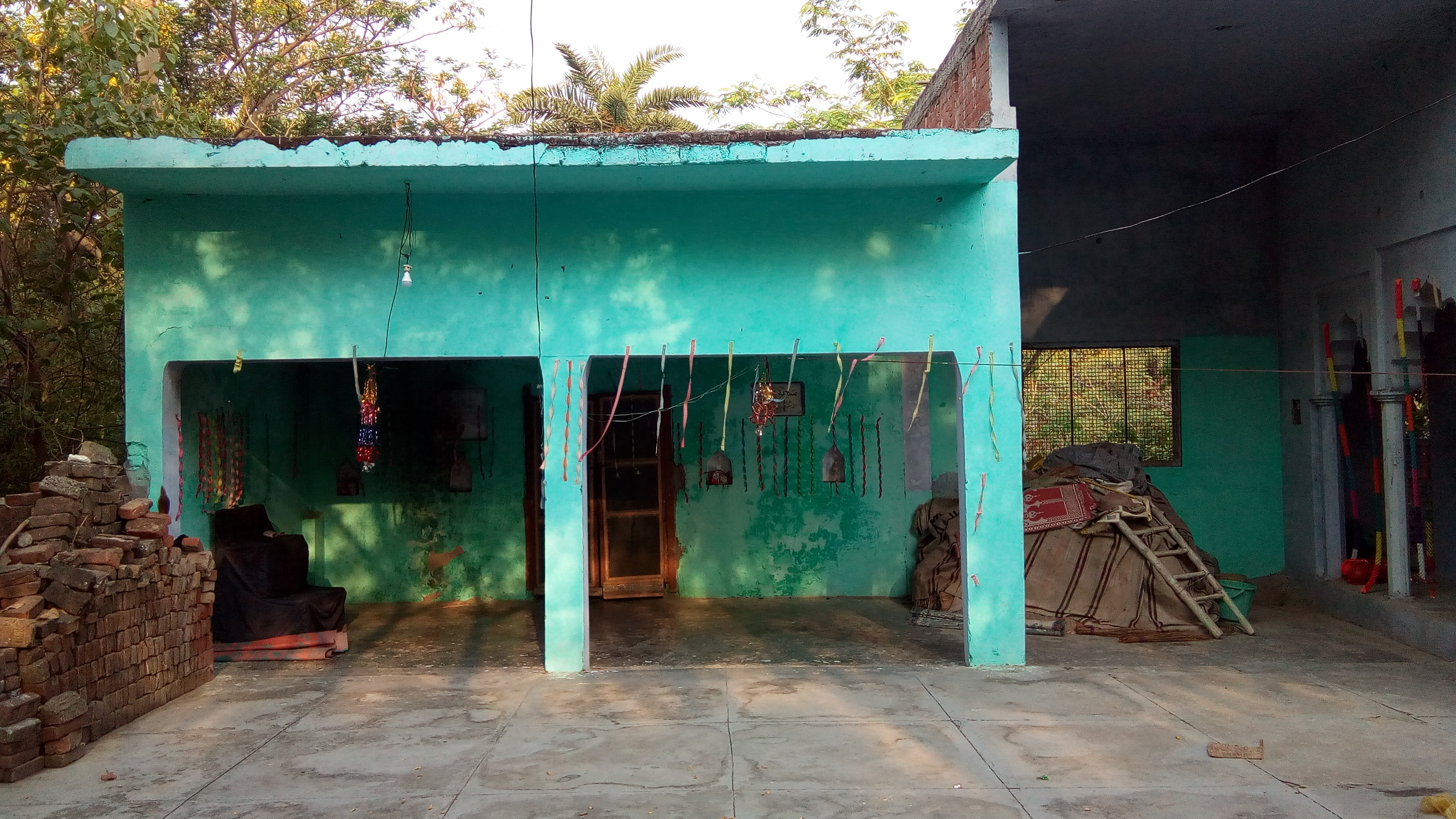
First Mosque of Sainthal situated at Sainthal Qabristan

Sainthal (some times pronounced as Senthal or Saithal) is a nagar panchayat in Nawabganj tehsil, Bareilly district, Uttar Pradesh, India.

== History ==
The ancient name of this town was Sherthal (Land of Lions) which evolved into Sainthal over time.

Sainthal is said to have been founded by Syed Jalal-ul-Deen Lad Baraha and his son Syed Amanullah Baraha, both courtiers of Akbar the Great, who received this area from the Sultan of Delhi after his victory over the joint army of Muzaffar Khan and Mitrasen.

== Geography ==
It is situated on Hafizganj-Jaadopur road, 4 km away from NH-30 and 32 km away from Bareilly City. Sainthal is located at 28°31′40″N 79°34′15″E. It is well connected by Indian Railways.

There are also some ruins of small fort still present in form of "Teela" in southern part of Sainthal.

== Demographics ==
As per 2011 Census of India the total population of Sainthal is 15,332 out of which 7,916 are males and 7,416 are females thus the Average Sex Ratio of Sainthal is 937. Sainthal is mainly home to Zaidi Sayyids.

The population of children of age 0–6 years in Sainthal city is 2176 which is 14% of the total population. There are 1097 male children and 1079 female children between the age 0–6 years. Thus as per the Census 2011 the Child Sex Ratio of Sainthal is 984 which is greater than Average Sex Ratio (937).

As per the 2011 Census of India the literacy rate of Sainthal is 56.2%. Thus Sainthal has lower literacy rate compared to 58.5% of Bareilly district. The male literacy rate is 54.9% and the female literacy rate is 41.2% in Sainthal.
