= Nathu Singh Gurjar =

Indian politician (born 1951)

Member of Parliament, Lok Sabha
- In office 1977 - 1980, 1989 – 1991
- Succeeded by: Rajesh Pilot
- Constituency: Dausa

Personal details
- Party: Bhartiya Janta Party
- Occupation: Politician

Nathu Singh Gurjar (born 1 January 1951, Dhamsya) is an Indian politician. He was a cabinet minister in Government of Rajasthan led by Vasundhara Raje of Bharatiya Janata Party. He was elected to the Rajasthan Legislative Assembly from Dausa district of Rajasthan. He is a former member of the Lok Sabha and represented Dausa constituency. He studied for B.Sc., LLM and Ph.D.
