= Hari Singh Mahua =

Indian politician

- Born: Dausa, Rajasthan
- Occupation: Politician
- Political party: Indian National Congress

Hari Singh Mahua is a member of the Indian National Congress and vice president of the Rajasthan Pradesh Congress Committee. He also served as minister in the Government of Rajasthan. He was elected to the Rajasthan Legislative Assembly, representing the Mahuwa constituency for a period from 1980 to 2003.
