= Murari Lal Meena =

Indian politician

Member of Parliament, Lok Sabha
- Incumbent
- Assumed office 4 June 2024
- Preceded by: Jaskaur Meena
- Constituency: Dausa

Minister of State Government of Rajasthan
- In office 22 November 2021 – 3 December 2023
- Ministry and Departments: Agriculture Marketing (Independent Charge); Estate (Independent Charge); Tourism & Civil Aviation State Minister

Member of Rajasthan Legislative Assembly
- In office 2018 – 18 June 2024
- Preceded by: Shankar Lal Sharma
- Succeeded by: Deen Dayal Bairwa
- Constituency: Dausa
- In office 2008–2013
- Preceded by: Nand Lal Banshiwal
- Succeeded by: Shankar Lal Sharma
- Constituency: Dausa
- In office 2003–2008
- Preceded by: Shailendra Joshi
- Succeeded by: Ram Kishor Saini
- Constituency: Bandikui

Personal details
- Born: 20 July 1960 (age 65) Aliyapara, Dausa, Rajasthan, India
- Party: Indian National Congress
- Other political affiliations: Bahujan Samaj Party (2003-2009)
- Spouse: Savita Meena (m. 1984)
- Children: 3
- Education: Diploma Civil engineering
- Occupation: Politician

Murari Lal Meena (born 20 July 1960; Hindi pronunciation: [mʊɾaːɾiː laːl miːɳaː]) is an Indian politician. He is currently serving as Member of Parliament, 18th Lok Sabha from Dausa. He formerly served as cabinet minister in Government of Rajasthan. He previously served as an MLA for Bandikui from 2003 to 2008 and subsequently from the Dausa from 2008 to 2013 and then from 2018 to 2024. He is a member of the Indian National Congress.
