= Mandawar, Rajasthan =

Mandawar
- Town
- Mandawar
- Location in Rajasthan, India Mandawar (India)
- Coordinates: 27.164°N 76.853°E
- Country: India
- State: Rajasthan
- District: Dausa.

Government
  - Body: Tehsil, Nagar Palika
- Elevation: 263 m (863 ft)

Population (2011)
  - Total: 11,960

Languages
  - Official: Hindi
- Time zone: UTC+5:30 (IST)
- Pincode: 321609
- ISO 3166 code: RJ-IN
- Vehicle registration: RJ29

Mandawar is a town in the Dausa district in the Indian state of Rajasthan. It is located about 140 km (87 mi) from the state capital, Jaipur and 250 km (160 mi) from Delhi.

== History ==
The town of Mandawar is situated in the north-eastern region of Rajasthan, a region widely known as Mewat.

== Geography ==
Mandawar is situated in the northern part of Dausa district of Rajasthan at an elevation of 253 m.

== Demographics ==
Mandawar is a town with population of under 11,960 in 2011 census.

Mandawar Pin code is 321609 and postal head office is Mahwa Road.

Banawar (6 km), Raipur (2 KM), Reendli (3 KM), Garh Himmat Singh (3 KM), Ukroond (4 KM), Jatwara (4 KM) are the nearby Villages to Mandawar. Mandawar is surrounded by Reni Tehsil towards west, Kathumar Tehsil towards North, Weir Tehsil towards East, Bandikui Tehsil towards west.

Mahwa, Rajgarh (Alwar), Todabhim, Bandikui are the near by Cities to Mandawar..

Mandawar Pin Code is 321609.

== Language ==
Hindi and Rajasthani languages are spoken in MandawarAhirwati, also called ‘Hirwati’ (the language of Ahirs also Language of Rajputana), is spoken in Ahirwal region.

Rewari, Mahendergarh, Narnaul, Gurgaon, Kotkasim, Kotputli, Bansur, Behror and Mundawar may be considered as the centre of Ahirwati speaking area.

== Location ==
Mandawar town is located in the National Capital Region, 125 km south of Delhi, 140 km north of state capital Jaipur, 39.5 km north of Alwar city, 28 km east of Behror 25 km east of Rewari city, 70 km south of Dharuhera, 65 km south of Bhiwadi and 20 km north of Tijara, another town in Dausa district.

It is easily reached from NH8 (Delhi-Jaipur-Mumbai highway) via Behror. Regular buses connect Mandawar to Behror, Khairthal, Rewari, Dharuhera.
