= Sainthal, Rajasthan =

Sainthal
- town area
- Location in Rajasthan, India Sainthal (India)
- Coordinates: 27°02′N 76°18′E
- Country: India
- State: Rajasthan
- District: Dausa

Population (2001)
  - Total: 11,000

Languages
  - Official: Hindi
- Time zone: UTC+5:30 (IST)
- Telephone code: 01427

Sainthal is a town and a nagar panchayat in Dausa district in the Indian state of Rajasthan. Sainthal is 24 kilometres from Dausa city.

== Demographics ==
As of 2001 India census, Sainthal had a population of 11,000. Males constitute 52% of the population and females 48%. In Sainthal, 18% of the population is under 6 years of age.
