= Laxman Meena =

Indian politician

Member of the Rajasthan Legislative Assembly
- Incumbent
- Assumed office 2018
- Preceded by: Anju Devi Dhanka
- Constituency: Bassi (ST)

Personal details
- Born: 17 June 1950 (age 75) Siya Ka Bas, Bassi, Jaipur district, Rajasthan, India
- Party: Indian National Congress
- Other political affiliations: Independent (until 2019)
- Spouse: Meeta Meena
- Education: Postgraduate
- Alma mater: University of Rajasthan (M.A. Economics)
- Occupation: Politician
- Profession: Retired IPS officer

Laxman Meena (born 17 June 1950) is an Indian politician and retired IPS officer from the state of Rajasthan. He currently serves as a member of the Rajasthan Legislative Assembly, representing the Bassi (ST) since 2018. He is affiliated with the Indian National Congress.

== Early life and education ==
Laxman Meena was born on 17 June 1950 in Siya Ka Bas, a village located in the Bassi region of Jaipur district, Rajasthan. He is the son of the late Shri Govindram. He completed his post-graduation with a Master of Arts degree in Economics from the University of Rajasthan in 1975.

Before entering politics, Meena served in the Indian Police Service (IPS) and retired from government service. He receives a pension from his IPS tenure. His spouse, Meeta Meena, is a homemaker.

== Political career ==
Meena contested the 2013 Rajasthan Legislative Assembly election from the Bassi constituency as a candidate of the Indian National Congress but lost to Anju Devi Dhanka, an independent candidate.

In the 2018 Rajasthan Legislative Assembly election, he contested as an independent candidate and won the seat with 79,878 votes. Following his victory, he joined the Indian National Congress along with 11 other independent MLAs.

He was re-elected in the 2023 Rajasthan Legislative Assembly election as a Congress candidate, securing 88,043 votes and defeating BJP’s Chandramohan Meena.

== Electoral record ==
Election results
| Year | Office | Constituency | Party | Votes | % | Opponent | Opponent Party | Votes | % | Result | Ref |
|---|---|---|---|---|---|---|---|---|---|---|---|
| 2013 | MLA | Bassi | Indian National Congress | 29,703 | 20.64 | Anju Devi Dhanka | Independent | 48,095 | 33.42 | Lost | |
| 2018 | MLA | Bassi | Independent | 79,878 | 47.33 | Kanhaiyalal | Bharatiya Janata Party | 37,114 | 21.99 | Won | |
| 2023 | MLA | Bassi | Indian National Congress | 88,043 | 47.37 | Chandramohan Meena | Bharatiya Janata Party | 81,729 | 43.97 | Won | |
