= Lachhmangarh =

Former legislative assembly constituency of Rajasthan

Coordinates: 28.64°N 75.38°E

Lachhmangarh Assembly constituency was one of the 200 Legislative Assembly constituencies of the Rajasthan Legislative Assembly in India. It was notably represented by Rajendra Singh Gandura, who won the 1998 election by defeating the incumbent Rajasthan government minister, Nasru Khan . Located in the Alwar district and established in 1962, it stood as one of the largest constituencies in the state before its disestablishment in 2008 following the redrawing of electoral boundaries.

== Members of Legislative Assembly ==
Election	Member
1998	Rajendra Singh Gandura
2008 onwards	Seat abolished

== Election results ==
=== 1998 Assembly election ===
1998 Rajasthan Legislative Assembly election: Lachhmangarh
Party	Candidate	Votes	%	±%
INC	Rajendra Singh Gandura	27,777		
BJP	Nasru Khan	25,398		
Majority		2,379		
