= 1998 Rajasthan Legislative Assembly election =

Election in Indian state

- 25 November 1998

All 200 seats in the Rajasthan Legislative Assembly 101 seats needed for a majority
- Registered: 30,132,777
- Turnout: 63.39% (▲2.8%)
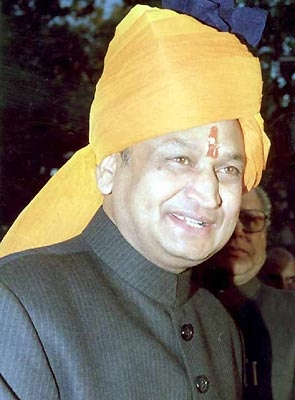

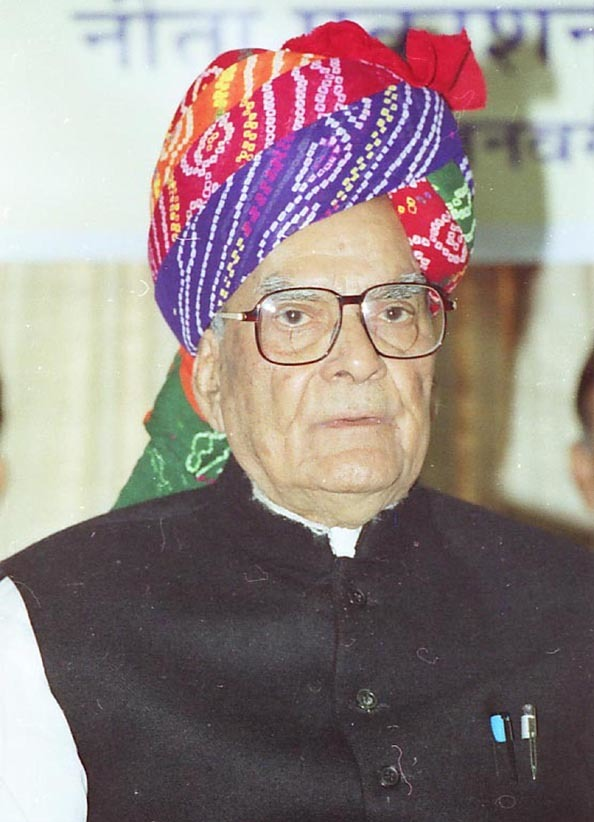
	Majority party	Minority party	Third party
			CPI(M)
Leader	Ashok Gehlot	Bhairon Singh Shekhawat
Party	INC	BJP	CPI(M)
Last election	76	95	1
Seats won	153	33	1
Seat change	▲77	▼62	Steady
CM before election
Bhairon Singh Shekhawat
BJP
Elected CM
Ashok Gehlot
INC

Legislative Assembly elections were held in the Indian state of Rajasthan in 1998. The incumbent ruling party Bharatiya Janata Party lost to the Indian National Congress.

== Schedule ==
Schedule
Poll event	Schedule	Day
Polling	25 November	Wednesday
Date of counting	28 November	Saturday
Declaration of result	28 November	Saturday

== Parties and alliances ==
Party/Alliance Name		Flag	Electoral symbol	Leader	Seats contested
NDA	Bharatiya Janata Party			Bhairon Singh Shekhawat	196
NDA	Indian National Lok Dal			Om Prakash Chautala	4
Indian National Congress				Ashok Gehlot	200

== Results ==
Party	Votes	%	Seats	+/–
Indian National Congress	8,467,160	44.95	153	▲77
Bharatiya Janata Party	6,258,509	33.23	33	▼62
Janata Dal	371,205	1.97	3	▼3
Bahujan Samaj Party	408,504	2.17	2	▲2
Rashtriya Janata Dal	52,866	0.28	1	New
Communist Party of India (Marxist)	152,749	0.81	1	0
Others	410,716	2.18	0	0
Independents	2,713,202	14.41	7	▼14
Total	18,834,911	100.00	200	+1
Valid votes	18,834,911	98.63		
Invalid/blank votes	261,501	1.37		
Total votes	19,096,412	100.00		
Registered voters/turnout	30,132,777	63.37		

== Elected members ==
Constituency	Reserved for (SC/ST/None)	Member	Party
Bhadra	None	Sanjeev Kumar	Indian National Congress
Nohar	None	Suchitra Arya	Indian National Congress
Tibi	SC	Aad Ram	Indian National Congress
Hanumangarh	None	Ram Pratap	Bharatiya Janata Party
Sangaria	None	Krishan Chander	Indian National Congress
Ganganagar	None	Radheyshyam Ganganagar	Indian National Congress
Kesrisinghpur	SC	Hira Lal Indora	Indian National Congress
Karanpur	None	Gurmeet Singh	Indian National Congress
Raisinghnagar	SC	Nihal Chand	Bharatiya Janata Party
Pilibanga	None	Harchand Singh Sidhu	Indian National Congress
Suratgarh	None	Vijay Laxmi Bishnoi	Indian National Congress
Lunkaransar	None	Bhim Sain	Indian National Congress
Bikaner	None	Bulaki Das Kalla	Indian National Congress
Kolayat	None	Devi Singh Bhati	Bharatiya Janata Party
Nokha	SC	Rewant Ram Panwar	Indian National Congress
Dungargarh	None	Mangla Ram Godara	Indian National Congress
Sujangarh	SC	Master Bhanwar Lal	Indian National Congress
Ratangarh	None	Jaidev Prasad Indoria	Indian National Congress
Sardarshahar	None	Bhanwar Lal Sharma	Indian National Congress
Churu	None	Rajendra Rathore	Bharatiya Janata Party
Taranagar	None	Chandan Mal Baid	Indian National Congress
Sadulpur	None	Ram Singh	Bharatiya Janata Party
Pilani	None	Sharwan Kumar	Indian National Congress
Surajgarh	SC	Hanuman Prasad	Indian National Congress
Khetri	None	Dr.jitendra Singh	Indian National Congress
Gudha	None	Shivnath Singh	Indian National Congress
Nawalgarh	None	Bhanwar Singh	Indian National Congress
Jhunjhunu	None	Sumitra Singh	Independent
Mandawa	None	Ramnarayan Choudhary	Indian National Congress
Fatehpur	None	Bhanwru Khan	Indian National Congress
Laxmangarh	SC	Parasram Mordia	Indian National Congress
Sikar	None	Rajendra Pareek	Indian National Congress
Dhod	None	Amra Ram	Communist Party of India
Danta - Ramgarh	None	Narayan Singh	Indian National Congress
Srimadhopur	None	Deependra Singh	Indian National Congress
Khandela	None	Mahadeo Singh	Indian National Congress
Neem-ka-thana	None	Mohan Lal Modi	Indian National Congress
Chomu	None	Bhagwan Sahai Saini	Indian National Congress
Amber	None	Sahadev Sharma	Indian National Congress
Jaipur Rural	None	Nawal Kishore Sharma	Indian National Congress
Hawamahal	None	Bhanwar Lal Sharma	Bharatiya Janata Party
Johribazar	None	Taqiuddin Ahmed	Indian National Congress
Kishanpole	None	Mahesh Joshi	Indian National Congress
Bani Park	None	Udai Singh Rathore	Indian National Congress
Phulera	None	Nanuram Kakaraliya	Indian National Congress
Dudu	SC	Babu Lal Nagar	Indian National Congress
Sanganer	None	Indira Mayaram	Indian National Congress
Phagi	SC	Ashok Tanvar	Indian National Congress
Lalsot	ST	Prasadi Lal	Indian National Congress
Sikrai	ST	Mahendra Kumar Meena	Indian National Congress
Bandikui	None	Shailendra Joshi	Indian National Congress
Dausa	SC	Nand Lal	Independent
Bassi	None	Kanhaiya Lal	Bharatiya Janata Party
Jamwa Ramgarh	None	Ram Chandra	Indian National Congress
Bairath	None	Smt. Kamla	Indian National Congress
Kotputli	None	Raghuvir Singh	Bharatiya Janata Party
Bansur	None	Jagat Singh Dayama	Bahujan Samaj Party
Behror	None	Dr. Karan Singh Yadav	Indian National Congress
Mandawar	None	Dr.jaswant Singh Yadav	Bharatiya Janata Party
Tizara	None	Jagmal Singh Yadav	Rashtriya Janata Dal
Khairthal	SC	Chandra Shekhar	Indian National Congress
Ramgarh	None	Gyan Dev Ahuja	Bharatiya Janata Party
Alwar	None	Jitendra Singh	Indian National Congress
Thanagazi	None	Krishan Murari Gangawat	Indian National Congress
Rajgarh	ST	Johari Lal	Indian National Congress
Lachhmangarh	None	Rajendra Singh Gandura	Indian National Congress
Kathumar	SC	Ramesh Chand	Indian National Congress
Kaman	None	Tayyab Hussain	Indian National Congress
Nagar	None	M. Mahir Azad	Bahujan Samaj Party
Deeg	None	Arun Singh	Independent
Kumher	None	Hari Singh	Indian National Congress
Bharatpur	None	R.p.sharma	Indian National Congress
Rupbas	SC	Nirbhay Lal	Indian National Congress
Nadbai	None	Yashvant Singh ( Ramu)	Independent
Weir	SC	Shanti Pahadia	Indian National Congress
Bayana	None	Brijendra Singh Soopa	Indian National Congress
Rajakhera	None	Pradyumn Singh	Indian National Congress
Dholpur	None	Shiv Ram	Bharatiya Janata Party
Bari	None	Jaswant Singh	Bharatiya Janata Party
Karauli	None	Janardan Gahlot	Indian National Congress
Sapotra	ST	Kamala	Indian National Congress
Khandar	SC	Ashok	Indian National Congress
Sawai Madhopur	None	Yasmin Abrar	Indian National Congress
Bamanwas	ST	Kirodi Lal Meena	Bharatiya Janata Party
Gangapur	None	Durga Prasad	Independent
Hindaun	SC	Bharosi Lal	Indian National Congress
Mahuwa	None	Hari Singh	Indian National Congress
Toda Bhim	ST	Ram Swaroop	Indian National Congress
Niwai	SC	Banwari Lal	Indian National Congress
Tonk	None	Zakiya	Indian National Congress
Uniara	None	Digvijay Singh	Indian National Congress
Todaraisingh	None	Chandra Bhan (dr.)	Indian National Congress
Malpura	None	Surendra Vyas	Independent
Kishangarh	None	Nathu Ram	Indian National Congress
Ajmer East	SC	Lalit Bhati	Indian National Congress
Ajmer West	None	Kishan Motwani	Indian National Congress
Pushkar	None	Ramzan Khan	Bharatiya Janata Party
Nasirabad	None	Govind Singh	Indian National Congress
Beawar	None	K.c. Choudhari	Indian National Congress
Masuda	None	Kayyum Khan	Indian National Congress
Bhinai	None	Sanwar Lal	Bharatiya Janata Party
Kekri	SC	Babu Lal Singariyan	Indian National Congress
Hindoli	None	Rama Pilot	Indian National Congress
Nainwa	None	Prabhu Lal Karsolia	Bharatiya Janata Party
Patan	SC	Ghasi Lal Meghwal	Indian National Congress
Bundi	None	Mamta Sharma	Indian National Congress
Kota	None	Shanti Kumar Dhariwal	Indian National Congress
Ladpura	None	Poonam Goyal	Indian National Congress
Digod	None	Hemant Kumar	Indian National Congress
Pipalda	SC	Ram Gopal Bairwa	Indian National Congress
Baran	None	Shiv Narayan	Indian National Congress
Kishanganj	ST	Heera Lal	Indian National Congress
Atru	SC	Madan Dilawar	Bharatiya Janata Party
Chhabra	None	Pratap Singh	Bharatiya Janata Party
Ramganjmandi	None	Ram Kishan Verma	Indian National Congress
Khanpur	None	Minakshee Chandrawat	Indian National Congress
Manohar Thana	None	Jagannath	Bharatiya Janata Party
Jhalrapatan	None	Mohan Lal	Indian National Congress
Pirawa	None	Man Singh	Indian National Congress
Dag	SC	Madan Lal Verma	Indian National Congress
Begun	None	Ghanshyam	Indian National Congress
Gangrar	SC	Kaloo Lal Khateek	Indian National Congress
Kapasin	None	Mohan Lal Chittoriya	Indian National Congress
Chittorgarh	None	Surendra Jadawat	Indian National Congress
Nimbahera	None	Shri Chand Kriplani	Bharatiya Janata Party
Badi Sadri	None	Gulab Chand Kataria	Bharatiya Janata Party
Pratapgarh	ST	Nand Lal Meena	Bharatiya Janata Party
Kushalgarh	ST	Fate Singh	Janata Dal
Danpur	ST	Bhan Ji	Janata Dal
Ghatol	ST	Nana Lal	Indian National Congress
Banswara	None	Ramesh Chandra	Indian National Congress
Bagidora	ST	Jeet Mal	Janata Dal
Sagwara	ST	Bheekha Bhai Bheel	Indian National Congress
Chorasi	ST	Shankar Lal Ahari	Indian National Congress
Dungarpur	ST	Nathu Ram Ahari	Indian National Congress
Aspur	ST	Tara Chand Bhagora	Indian National Congress
Lasadia	ST	Nagraj	Indian National Congress
Vallabhnagar	None	Gulab Singh	Indian National Congress
Mavli	None	Shiv Singh	Indian National Congress
Rajsamand	SC	Banshi Lal Gehlot	Indian National Congress
Nathdwara	None	C.p. Joshi	Indian National Congress
Udaipur	None	Trilok Poorbiya	Indian National Congress
Udaipur Rural	ST	Khem Raj Katara	Indian National Congress
Salumber	ST	Roop Lal	Indian National Congress
Sarada	ST	Raghuvir Singh	Indian National Congress
Kherwara	ST	Daya Ram Parmar	Indian National Congress
Phalasia	ST	Kuber Singh	Indian National Congress
Gongunda	ST	Mangi Lal	Indian National Congress
Kumbhalgarh	None	Heera Lal Devpura	Indian National Congress
Bhim	None	Lakshman Singh Rawat	Indian National Congress
Mandal	None	Hafij Mohammad	Indian National Congress
Sahada	None	Dr. Ratan Lal Jat	Bharatiya Janata Party
Bhilwara	None	Devendra Singh	Indian National Congress
Mandalgarh	None	Shiv Charan Mathur	Indian National Congress
Jahazpur	None	Ratan Lal Tambi	Indian National Congress
Shahpura	SC	Devi Lal Bairwa	Indian National Congress
Banera	None	Ram Lal	Indian National Congress
Asind	None	Vijayendra Pal Singh	Bharatiya Janata Party
Jaitaran	None	Surendra Goyal	Bharatiya Janata Party
Raipur	None	Hira Singh Chaouhan	Bharatiya Janata Party
Sojat	None	Madhav Singh Diwan	Indian National Congress
Kharchi	None	Kesaram Choudhary	Bharatiya Janata Party
Desuri	SC	Atamram Meghwal	Indian National Congress
Pali	None	Gyan Chand Parakh	Bharatiya Janata Party
Sumerpur	None	Bina Kak	Indian National Congress
Bali	None	Bhairon Singh Shekhawat	Bharatiya Janata Party
Sirohi	None	Sanyam Lodha	Indian National Congress
Pindwara Abu	ST	Lala Ram Grasiya	Indian National Congress
Reodar	SC	Chhoga Ram Bakoliya	Indian National Congress
Sanchore	None	Heera Lal Bishnoi	Indian National Congress
Raniwara	None	Ratna Ram Choudhary	Indian National Congress
Bhinmal	None	Samarjeet Singh	Indian National Congress
Jalore	SC	Ganeshi Ram Meghwal	Bharatiya Janata Party
Ahore	None	Bagh Raj Choudhary	Indian National Congress
Siwana	SC	Goparam Meghwal	Indian National Congress
Pachpadra	None	Amraram	Bharatiya Janata Party
Barmer	None	Vridhichand Jain	Indian National Congress
Gudamalani	None	Hemaram Choudhary	Indian National Congress
Chohtan	None	Abdul Hadi	Indian National Congress
Sheo	None	Ameen Khan	Indian National Congress
Jaisalmer	None	Gordhan Das	Indian National Congress
Shergarh	None	Khet Singh Rathore	Indian National Congress
Jodhpur	None	Jugal Kabra	Indian National Congress
Sardarpura	None	Man Singh Deora	Indian National Congress
Sursagar	SC	Bhanwar Lal Balai	Indian National Congress
Luni	None	Ram Singh Vishnoi	Indian National Congress
Bilara	None	Rajendra Choudhary	Indian National Congress
Bhopalgarh	None	Paras Ram Maderana	Indian National Congress
Osian	None	Narendra Singh Bhati	Indian National Congress
Phalodi	None	Ram Narayan Vishnoi	Bharatiya Janata Party
Nagaur	None	Harendra Mirdha	Indian National Congress
Jayal	SC	Mohan Lal Barupal	Indian National Congress
Ladnu	None	Harji Ram	Indian National Congress
Deedwana	None	Rupa Ram	Indian National Congress
Nawan	None	Harish Chand	Bharatiya Janata Party
Makrana	None	Abdul Aziz	Indian National Congress
Parbatsar	SC	Mohan Lal Chauhan	Indian National Congress
Degana	None	Richhpal Singh Mirdha	Independent
Merta	None	Mangi Lal Danga	Indian National Congress
Mundwa	None	Habiboor Rahaman	Indian National Congress
