= Mahwa, Rajasthan =

Mahwa
- Town
- Nickname: महुवा
- Location in Rajasthan, India Mahwa (India)
- Coordinates: 27°03′N 76°56′E
- Country: India
- State: Rajasthan
- District: Dausa

Population (2001)
  - Total: 19,559

Languages
  - Official: Hindi
- Time zone: UTC+5:30 (IST)
- ISO 3166 code: RJ-IN
- Vehicle registration: RJ 29

Mahwa is a census town in the Dausa district of Rajasthan, India.

== Geography ==
Mahwa is located 62 kilometres (39 mi) from its district main city, Dausa, and 114 kilometres (71 mi) from its state main city Jaipur.

== Demographics ==
According to the 2001 census of India, Mahwa had a population over 19,558. Males constituted 53% of the population and females 47%. Mahwa had an average literacy rate of 60%, higher than the national average of 59.5%: male literacy is 72%, and female literacy is 47%. In Mahwa, 20% of the population is under 6 years of age.

== See also ==
- Kherla Bujurg, a large village in Mahwa Mandal
- Palanhera. village
