= Nawabganj, Bareilly =

Nawabganj
- town
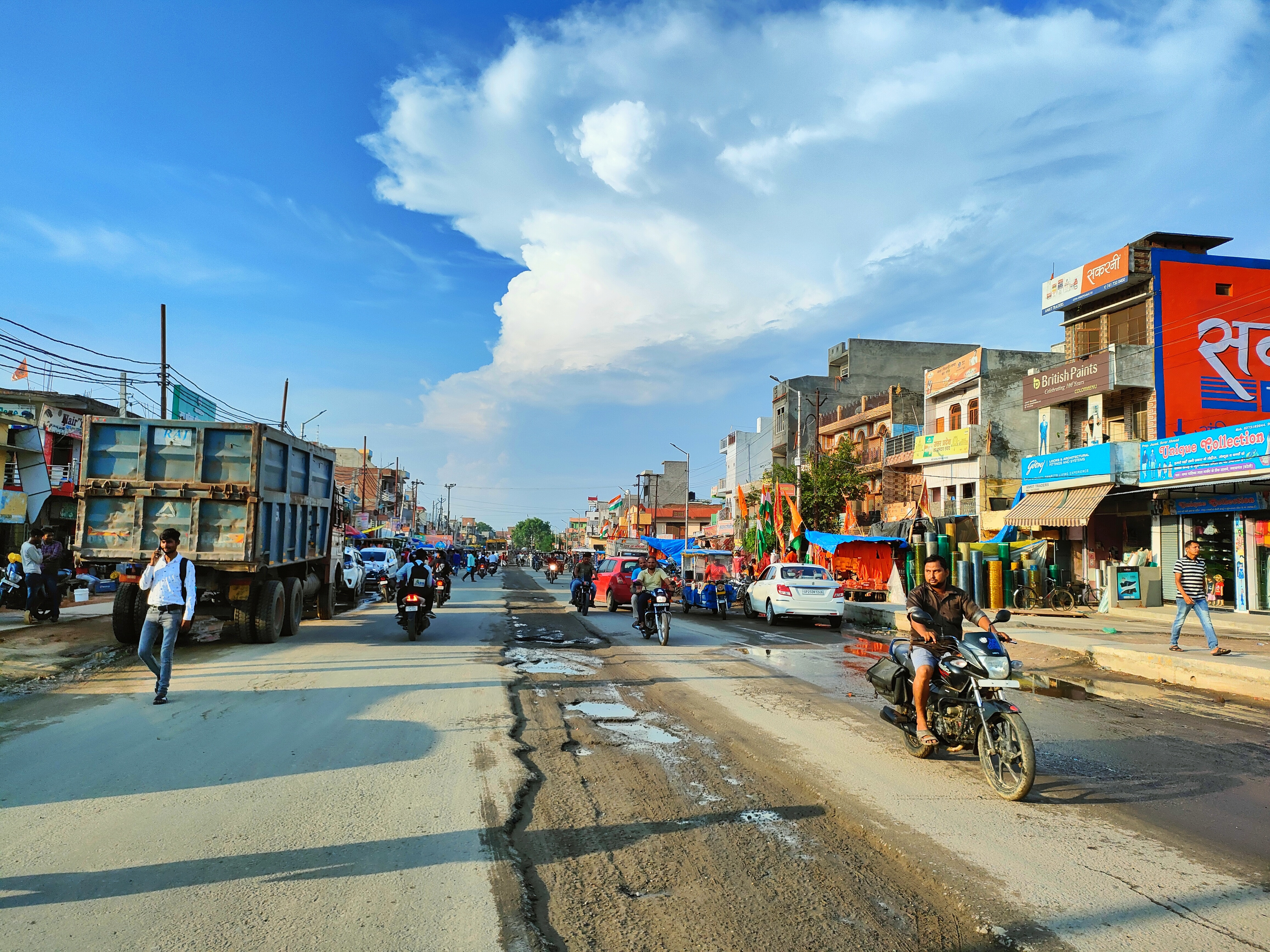
- NH 30 at Nawabganj

- Location in Uttar Pradesh, India
- Coordinates: 28.540°N 79.633°E
- Country: India
- State: Uttar Pradesh
- District: Bareilly
- Elevation: 393 m (1,289 ft)

Population (2011)
  - Total: 39,241

Languages
  - Official: Hindi
- Time zone: UTC+5:30 (IST)
- Postal code: 262406
- Vehicle registration: UP 25
- Website: https://nawabganj.in

Nawabganj (also spelled as Nawabgunj and Nawabgunge in British Raj) is a Nagar palika and an administrative subdivision (or tehsil or pargana) of Bareilly district in the Indian state of Uttar Pradesh. A Sub Divisional Magistrate, also called Sub Divisional Officer, or pargana-adhikari (literally pargana-officer) is the head official.

Under the three-tier Panchayat Raj Institution system, Nawabganj comes under Bareilly Zila (district) Panchayat (ZP) and is a headquarters of block panchayat covering 86 gram panchayats. There are 1007 gram panchayats in Bareilly district and 52,002 Gram Panchayats in the Uttar Pradesh state.

== History ==
Nawabganj was originally called Bijauria. The present name refers to a market built here under Asaf-ud-Daula, who was Nawab of Oudh in the late 1700s. The market quickly came to prosper, benefitting from its advantageous position on the road from Bareilly to Pilibhit, and in 1815 it was made the headquarters of a newly created tehsil and pargana (it had previously been part of Karor pargana in Bareilly tehsil). Around the turn of the 20th century, Nawabganj was described as a compactly built town, with markets held four times a week and generating significant trade in local produce. A large fair was held on the festival day of Dasahra. The population in 1901 was 4,199, consisting of 2,352 Hindus, 1,819 Muslims, and 28 Christians.

== Demographics and geography ==
In 1865, the population of Nawabganj town was 4,418 and population of Nawabganj pargana was 1,22,264. Population growth between 1891 and 1901 was only 2.2% because of severe droughts in 1860-61 and 1869-70.

Nawabganj Tahsil (The Imperial Gazetteer of India Vol 10, 1886, page 246)

Nawābganj — Central tahsil of Bareli (Bareilly) District, North Western Provinces, conterminous with the pargana of Nawabganj; consisting of a well-tilled portion of the level Rohilkhand plain, with a few shallow grooves cut therein by numerous rivers and canals, which form its most salient feature. The principal of these rivers, proceeding from east to west, are the following:— Deoha, Apsāra, Pangaili, Bahgul, Nakatia and Deoraniya, with several tributaries and irrigation distributary canals. Population (1871) 1,24,276; (1881) 1,17,002, namely, males 62,931 and females 54,071. decrease in population since 1872, 7274, or 5.8 percent in nine years. Classified according to religion, the population in 1881 consisted of — Hindus, 95,470; Muhammadans, 21,531; and 1 'other'. Of the 303 villages in 1881, 227 contained less than five hundred inhabitants; 61 from five hundred to a thousand; 12 from one to one to two thousand; and only 3 from two to three thousand.

According to the official statement in 1878, Nawabganj tahsil contains an area of 226 1/3 square miles, of which 177 square miles were then cultivated. Of the total cultivated area, autumn crops occupy 73.15 percent, and spring crops 26.85 percent. The principal autumn staples are rice, sugar-cane, and bajra; and the principal spring crops, wheat and barley. The area irrigated, either by artificial works, or by natural overflow of alluvial lands, is returned at 57 percent of the cultivated area. The Government land revenue in 1878 amounted to £22,803, or an average of 4s. 7 3/4d. per cultivated acre. Total Government land revenue, including local rates and cesses levied on the land, £25,242. Estimated total rental paid by the cultivators (a large proporation of which is paid in kind), £36,720.

The landholding classes are principally Muhammadans, Kayasths, Kurmis, and Brahmans. About 47 percent of the cultivated area is cultivated by Kurmis, 8.6 percent by Brahmans, and 6.6 percent by Chamars. Tenants with rights of occupancy are more than three times as numerous as any other class of cultivators. Sugar-boiling is the only important manufacture. The chief local marts for surplus produce are Nawabganj, Saithal, Baraur, and Hafizganj. The first and last being situated on the only road in the tahsil, the metalled line from Bareli to Pilibhit, and also on or near the newly opened Pilibhit branch of the Oudh and Rohilkhand Railway. In 1883, Nawabganj tahsil contained 1 criminal court, with 2 police circles (thanas), regular police force numbering 29 men, and a village watch or rular police of 229 chaukidars.

Nawabganj Town (The Imperial Gazetteer of India Vol 10, 1886, page 246-247)

Nawābganj — Town in Bareli (Bareilly) District, North-Western Provinces, and headquarters of Nawabganj tahsil; situated on the metalled road between Bareli and Pilibhit, 19 miles north-east of the former town. Nawabganj was founded between 1775 and 1797 by Asaf-ud-Daula, Nawab of Oudh. Population (1881) 4,343. Besides the usual tahsil courts and offices, Nawabganj contains a first-class police station, imperial post-office, and Anglo-vernacular school.

The town of Hafizganj already existed when Nawabganj was founded. Hafiz Rahmat Khan founded Hafizganj in order to offer merchants a resting place on the road from Bareilly to Pilibhit. New ganjes or quasbas were established to lure foreign trade and credit towards the Rohilla territories.

Nawabganj Tahsil (The Imperial Gazetteer of India Vol 18, 1908, page 427)

Nawābganj Tehsil — East Central tahsil of Bareilly District, United Provinces, conterminous with the pargana of the same name, lying between 28° 21′ and 28° 39′ N. and 79° 28′ and 79° 47′ E., with an area of 221 square miles. Population increased from 1,24,349 in 1891 to 1,27,160 in 1901. There are 308 villages and three towns, none of which has a population of 5000. The demand for land revenue in 1903-4 was Rs. 2,51,000 and for cesses Rs. 42,000. The density of population, 575 persons per square miles, is below the District average. The tahsil is a gently sloping plain, intersected by several small rivers from which canals are drawn. It is not so damp as the Baheri tahsil to the north, but the increase in population between 1891 and 1901 was less than in the south of District. Rice and sugar-cane are largely grown. In 1903-4, 178 square miles were cultivated, of which 55 were irrigated. Canals supply half the irrigated area, and wells most of the remainder.

The Imperial Gazetteer of India Vol 7 1908, gives statistics of area and population of Nawabganj Tehsil as follows:

Area and Population of Nawabganj Tehsil in year 1901
Area in square miles	Number of towns	Number of Villages	Population	Population per square miles	Percentage of variation in population between 1891 and 1901	Number of persons able to read and write
221	3	308	1,27,160	575	+2.2	1404

Agriculture statistics of Nawabganj Tehsil in year 1901 (in square miles)
Total	Cultivated	Irrigated	Cultivated waste
221	178	55	12

Nawabganj Experimental Sugar Factory

The area was known for ingenious production of gur and sugar. Earliest known reference of this in British India is found in The Louisiana Planter and Sugar Manufacturers journal dated 18 January 1919. The report titled "The Improvement of the Indigenous Methods of Gur and Sugar making in the United Provinces" was published in 1916 in Imperial Agricultural Research Institute Bulletin 82, 1916 by William Edward Hulme, Sugar Engineer Expert to Government of India and R. P. Sanghi, Sugar Chemist, Nawabganj Experimental Factory. Reference to the paper (IOR/V/27/515/31 1916) can be found in British Library.

Nawabganj Experimental Factory was erected in 1914–15. The site chosen was a government farm.

As a sugar engineer, William Hulme was assigned to study the indigenous methods of sugar manufacture with a view to determining the best methods of extracting and concentrating the juice for the manufacture of gur and white sugar respectively, both on the scale within the means of individuals or small groups of cultivators, and on a scale suited to the resources of capitalists now engaged in the industry in India.

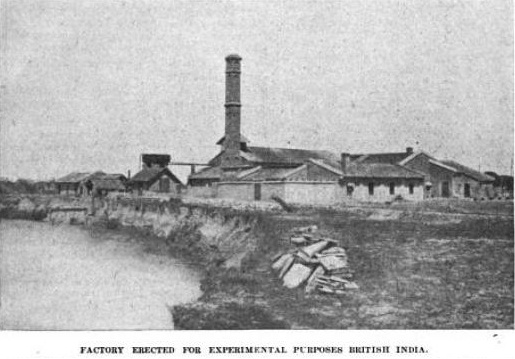
Nawabganj Experimental Sugar Factory (1914–15)

Rivers

Pungheli The Pungeilee rises in a jheel near Mouzah Bhugnera in Pergunnah Jehanabad, traverses Jehanabad and Nawabgunj, and joins the Apsurha at Moondeea. It is fed by springs in its bed which is of clay and sand. The stara pierced through in sinking wells of the bridge on the pillibheet road were alternately clay and sand down to 20 feet below the surface, when boulders were first met with.

Kandu The Kandoo is a small stream which rises near Aspore in Pergunnah Nawabgunj, and falls into the east Bygool and Bhursur in Crore. It is crossed by the Pillibheet road by an old masonry bridge near Sithra in Nawabgunj. The banks are steep, and there is very little irrigation from it.

Begul River Canals The Bygool Canals take their origin from the Roodpore and Bhanpore earthen dams, and the Chooreyli and Giram masonry dams. After leaving the Terai, they run through Jehanabad, Ritcha, and Nawabgunj Pergunnahs. They consist of a group of small water-courses known as the Burha feeder, and the Sisona, Bhanpore, Nukutpore, Suseynia, Chooreylee, Girem, and Ougunpore Rujbuhas. None of them are more than about 10′ in width, and their velocity is 3′ per second. They can irrigate about 30,000 acres per year.

== Politics ==
- Present Member of Parliament (MP) in Lok sabha : Mr. Chhatrapal Gangwar, Bhartiya Janta party, holding the charge of State Minister of Finance Ministry, in Government of India
- Present Member of Legislative Assembly (MLA) : Dr. Mukta Prasad Arya Gangwar

Mr. Kesar Singh Gangwar, who made fun of the masks belonging to Bhartiya Janta Party died of Corona virus. He was the MLA.

- Present Chairperson of Nagar Palika : Mrs. PremLata Rathore, Bhartiye Janta Party

== Education ==
- University-

B.r. genius international school

- Mahatma Jyotiba Phule Rohilkhand University (Bareilly)
- Graduation College-
- Adarsh Mahavidyalaya Hardua Nawabganj
- Gangasheel Mahavidyalaya, Faijullapur, Nawanganj
- Lal Bahadur Shastri Group Of Education institutions Hardua Kifaytulla Nawabganj, Bareilly
- Inter College-
- Bhagwati inter college
- Spice Sr. Secondary School
- Jay Prakash Narayan (JPN) Inter College
- Shri Krishna Inter College
- Jesus and Mary Inter College
- Government Girls Inter College
- R P GANGWAR INTER COLLEGE
- Spice Children Academy
- Standard Moral Junior High School
- Jesus and Mary Institute of Distance Learning
- Mission Public School
- St. Thomas
- St. Paul
- Lalta Prasad SVM Inter college Nawabganj Bareilly
- Khushi technical training centre Ghass Mandi Nawabganj
- Bala Ji Maths and Physics Classes

== Tourism ==
Nearby points of interest include:

- Bijauria Railway Station (3.1 km)
- Kainchi pul (near Bijauria Railway Station)
- Laal pul (near Bijauria Railway Station)
- Kamani Bridge (Purana Pul)
- Jama Masjid (River bank of Panghaili)
- Bareilly (32 km)
- Nainital (142 km)
- Pilibhit (21 km)
- World-famous Jim Corbett National Park (178 km)
- Dudhwa National Park (120 km)
- Sitarganj (56 km)
- Haridwar (311 km)
- Nanakmatta, Nanaksagar (65 km)
- Mahendera Nagar (Nepal) (87 km)
- Pilibhit Tiger Reserve (55 km)
- Sethal (12 km)
- Hafiz Ganj (9.1 km)
- Barkhan (8.2 km)
- Oswal Sugar Mill Aurangabaad (5.1 km)
- purana pull
- Grem Dam (2 km)
- Shiv polyhouse grem (3 km)
- Ahemdabad (Village of Keshar Singh MLA)
- VIP college like Jesus and Mary inter College Bhagwati inter college, Krishna instr college, Jpn college, Ggic, St. Thomas, mission public school...

== See also ==
- Administrative divisions of India
- Divisions of Uttar Pradesh
- Bareilly division
- Bareilly (Lok Sabha constituency)
- Municipal governance in India
- Zilla Panchayat (ZP)
- District Rural Development Agencies (DRDA)
- Uttar Pradesh Legislative Assembly
