= Dausa district =

District of Rajasthan in India

- District of Rajasthan
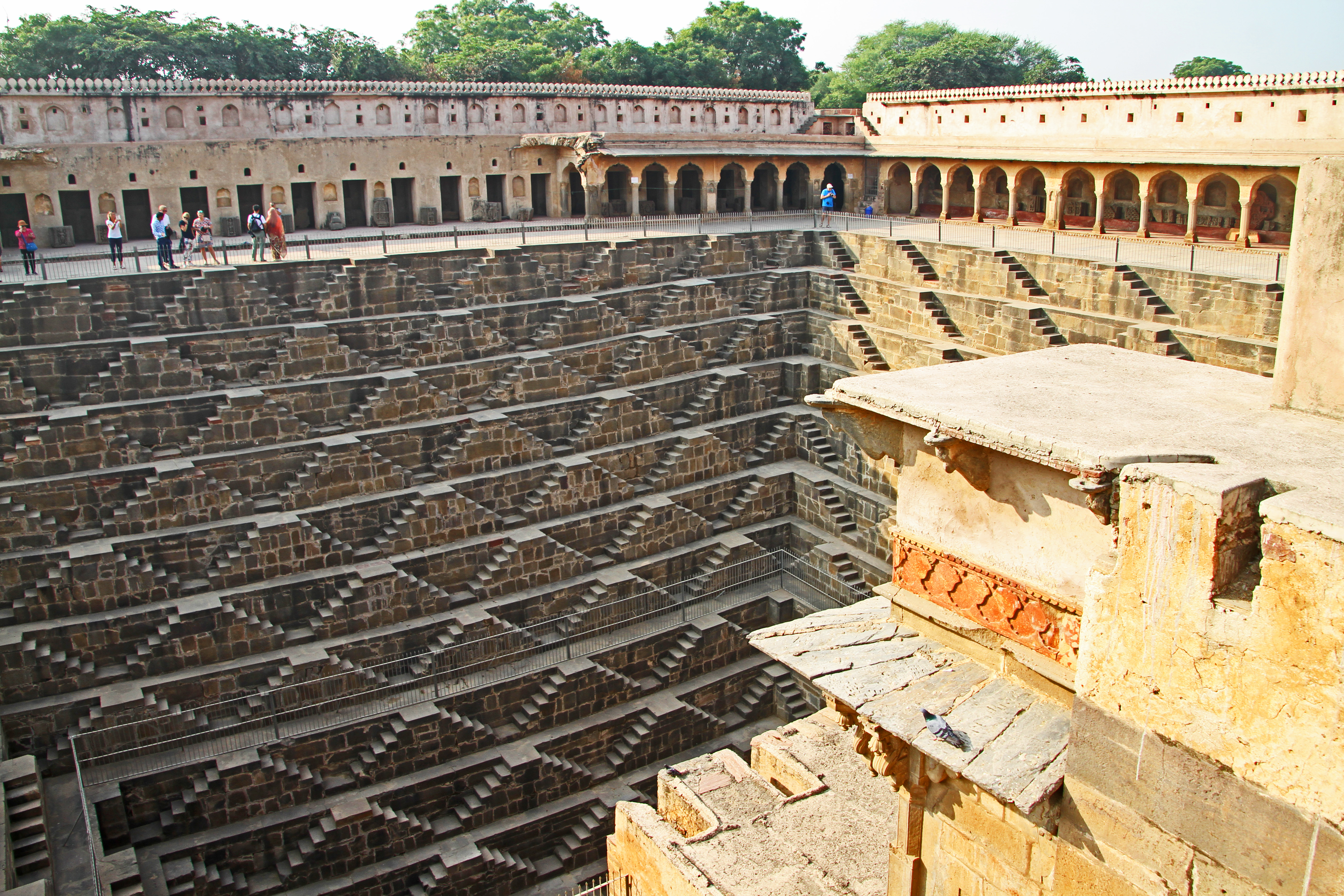
- Chand Baori, Abhaneri
- Interactive map of Dausa district
- Coordinates (Dausa): 26.54°N 76.19°E
- Country: India
- State: Rajasthan
- Division: Jaipur
- Headquarters: Dausa

Government
  - District Collector & Magistrate: Devendra Kumar, IAS
  - Superintendent of Police: Ranjeeta Sharma, IPS

Area
  - Total: 3,432 km^{2} (1,325 sq mi)

Population (2011)
  - Total: 1,634,409
  - Density: 476.2/km^{2} (1,233/sq mi)

Demographics
  - Literacy: 68.16%
  - Sex ratio: 905
- Time zone: UTC+05:30 (IST)
- Vehicle registration: RJ-29
- Major highways: National Highway 21 (NH-21) National Highway 148 (NH-148) Delhi–Mumbai Expressway (NE-4)
- Average annual precipitation: 459.8 mm
- Website: Dausa District

Dausa district is a district in the Indian state of Rajasthan. It is part of the Jaipur division–one of the ten administrative divisions of Rajasthan. The city of Dausa is the district headquarters. Other important cities are Bandikui, Lalsot, and Mahuwa. It is surrounded by Alwar district in the north, Bharatpur in the east, Gangapur in the south-east, Sawai Madhopur in the south, and Jaipur Rural in the west. It has an area of 3,432 km^{2} (1,325 sq mi) and a population of 1,634,409 (2011 census).

The district is named after the city of Dausa, derived from a Sanskrit word Dhau-Sa which means "Beautiful like Heaven".

== History ==
Dausa is situated in a region known as Dhundhar. It was ruled by the Chauhans and Badgurjars during the 10th century CE. It became the first capital of Dhundhar. In the 11th century CE, Dulha Rai won it from the Badgurjars and continued to rule until 1036 CE. Later, Dulha Rai changed his capital from Dausa to Khoh.

When Akbar went to Ajmer as a pilgrim to Khwaja Moinuddin Chisti in 1562 CE, he stayed in Dausa and met with Rupsi Bairagi, the Hakim of Dausa at the time and brother of the then ruler of Amber, Raja Bharmal.

Dausa district was constituted on 10 April 1991 by separating four tehsils, namely Dausa, Baswa, Sikrai, & Lalsot from Jaipur district. Mahwa Tehsil of Sawai Madhopur was included in this district on 15 August 1992.

== Geography ==
The district is situated between 22°33' and 27°33' north latitudes and 76°50' and 76°90' east longitudes. Dausa district is located in the eastern part of Rajasthan within Jaipur division. The area of the district is 3,432 km^{2} (1,325 sq mi) and ranks at 32nd among districts of Rajasthan. It is bordered by the district of Alwar to the north, Bharatpur to the east, Gangapur to the south-east, Sawai Madhopur to the south, and Jaipur Rural to the west.

The Banganga and Morel rivers run through the district. However, there are no perennial rivers in the district. The district falls within the three corresponding river basins namely "Banganga River Basin" in northern part, "Banas River Basin" in southern part, and "Gambhir River Basin" in lower eastern part.

The general topographic elevation in the district is between 250 m to 300 m above sea level. Elevation ranges from a minimum of 203.2 m above sea level in Mahwa in the northeastern part of the district and maximum of 596.3 m above sea level in Bandikui in northern part of the district.

=== Climate ===
The climate of the district mostly remains dry except in the rainy season. The annual normal rainfall of the district is 561 mm.

== Divisions ==
Dausa district has 11 Sub-divisions, 15 Tehsils, 11 Panchayat Samitis and 284 Gram Panchayats.

=== Sub–divisions ===
The 11 Sub-divisions in district are:

- Dausa
- Bandikui
- Lalsot
- Ramgarh Pachwara
- Lawan
- Nangal Rajawatan
- Sikrai
- Mahwa
- Mandawar
- Sainthal
- Baswa

=== Panchayat Samitis ===
The 11 Panchayat Samitis are:

- Dausa
- Bandikui
- Lalsot
- Lawan
- Mahwa
- Sikrai
- Ramgarh Pachwara
- Sikandra
- Nangal Rajawatan
- Baijupara
- Baswa

=== Tehsils ===
The 15 Tehsils are:

- Dausa
- Bandikui
- Lalsot
- Ramgarh Pachwara
- Lawan
- Baswa
- Nangal Rajawatan
- Mahwa
- Mandawar
- Sikrai
- Rahuwas
- Sainthal
- Baharawanda
- Baijupara
- Bhandarej

=== Lok Sabha Constituency ===
Dausa district is part of the Dausa Lok Sabha constituency, and Murari Lal Meena is the current Member of Parliament representing this constituency.

=== Vidhan Sabha Constituencies ===
Dausa district has 5 Vidhan Sabha constituencies.

Constituency number	Name	Party	Elected Representative
85	Bandikui	BJP	Bhagchand Tankda
86	Mahuwa	BJP	Rajendra Meena
87	Sikrai	BJP	Vikram Banshiwal
88	Dausa	INC	Murari Lal Meena
89	Lalsot	BJP	Rambilas Meena

== Demographics ==
Historical population
Year	Pop.	±% p.a.
1901	321,510	—
1911	305,507	−0.51%
1921	254,843	−1.80%
1931	283,384	+1.07%
1941	322,117	+1.29%
1951	403,207	+2.27%
1961	473,905	+1.63%
1971	588,702	+2.19%
1981	763,706	+2.64%
1991	999,227	+2.72%
2001	1,323,002	+2.85%
2011	1,634,409	+2.14%

According to the 2011 census Dausa district has a population of 1,634,409, with a population density of 476 persons per km², roughly equal to the nation of Guinea-Bissau or the US state of Idaho. This gives it a ranking of 305th in India (out of a total of 640). The district has a population density of 476 inhabitants per square kilometre (1,230/sq mi) . Its population growth rate over the decade 2001-2011 was 24.31%. Dausa has a sex ratio of 905 females for every 1000 males, and a literacy rate of 68.16%, with male literacy at 82.98% and female literacy at 51.93%. 12.35% of the population lives in urban areas. Scheduled Castes and Scheduled Tribes make up 21.68% and 26.51% of the population respectively.

=== Religion ===
Religions in Dausa district (2011)
Religion	Percent
Hinduism	96.81%
Islam	2.78%
Other or not stated	0.41%

According to the 2011 census, Hindus form the majority religious group accounting for 96.81% of the district's population, followed by Muslims (2.78%).

=== Languages ===
Languages of Dausa district (2011)
1. Hindi (86.8%)
2. Dhundari (6.64%)
3. Rajasthani (6.40%)
4. Others (0.19%)

At the time of the 2011 Census of India, 86.77% of the population in the district spoke Hindi, 6.64% Dhundari and 6.40% Rajasthani as their first language. The dialect of the region is Dhundari.
