= Jhalawar–Baran Lok Sabha constituency =

Lok Sabha Constituency in Rajasthan

Coordinates: 24.8°N 76.4°E

Jhalawar-Baran
- Lok Sabha constituency

Constituency details
- Country: India
- Region: North India
- State: Rajasthan
- Assembly constituencies: Anta; Baran-Atru; Chhabra; Dag; Jhalrapatan; Kishanganj; Khanpur; Manohar Thana
- Established: 2008
- Reservation: None

Member of Parliament
- 18th Lok Sabha
- Incumbent Dushyant Singh
- Party: Bharatiya Janata Party
- Elected year: 2024

Jhalawar–Baran (झालावाड़-बारां) Lok Sabha constituency is one of the 25 Lok Sabha (parliamentary) constituencies in Rajasthan state in western India. This constituency came into existence in 2008 as a part of the implementation of delimitation of parliamentary constituencies, based on the recommendations of the Delimitation Commission of India constituted in 2002. This constituency covers the entire Jhalawar and Baran districts.

== Assembly segments ==
Presently, Jhalawar–Baran Lok Sabha constituency comprises eight Vidhan Sabha (legislative assembly) segments. These are:

#	Name	District	Member	Party	2024 Lead
193	Anta	Baran	Pramod Jain Bhaya	INC	BJP
194	Kishanganj (ST)	Baran	Lalit Meena	BJP	BJP
195	Baran-Atru (SC)	Baran	Radheyshayam Bairwa	BJP	BJP
196	Chhabra	Baran	Pratap Singh Singhvi	BJP	BJP
197	Dag (SC)	Jhalawar	Kaluram Meghwal	BJP	BJP
198	Jhalrapatan	Jhalawar	Vasundhara Raje	BJP	BJP
199	Khanpur	Jhalawar	Suresh Gurjar	INC	BJP
200	Manohar Thana	Jhalawar	Govind Prasad	BJP	BJP

== Members of Parliament ==
Year	Member	Party
Till 2009 : Constituency did not exist
2009	Dushyant Singh	Bharatiya Janata Party
2014	Dushyant Singh	Bharatiya Janata Party
2019	Dushyant Singh	Bharatiya Janata Party
2024	Dushyant Singh	Bharatiya Janata Party

== Election results ==
=== 2024 ===
2024 Indian general election: Jhalawar-Baran
Party	Candidate	Votes	%	±%
BJP	Dushyant Singh	865,376	61.13	▼3.65
INC	Urmila Jain Bhaya	494,387	34.92	▲3.28
NOTA	None of the above	16,027	1.13	▼0.12
BSP	Chandra Singh Kirad	12,285	0.86	▼0.11
Independent	Ravi Raj Singh	10,274	0.72	N/A
RRP	Bhuvanesh Kumar	9,345	0.66	N/A
Independent	Babulal	7,692	0.54	N/A
Independent	Pintu Pajantorivala	5,945	0.42	N/A
Majority		3,70,989	26.21	▼6.93
Turnout		14,21,331	70.00	▼1.96
BJP hold		Swing		

=== 2019 ===
2019 Indian general elections: Jhalawar-Baran
Party	Candidate	Votes	%	±%
BJP	Dushyant Singh	887,400	64.78	+5.80
INC	Pramod Sharma	4,33,472	31.64	−2.78
NOTA	None of the Above	17,080	1.25	−0.41
BSP	Badree Lal	13,338	0.97	−1.09
IND.	Harish Dhakar	7,422	0.54	+0.54
IND.	Mohammad Nasir	5,107	0.37	+0.37
IND.	Abdul Qayyum Siddiqui	3,344	0.24	+0.24
IND.	Prince Meena	2,705	0.20	+0.20
Majority		4,53,928	33.14	+8.58
Turnout		13,70,017	71.96	+3.31
BJP hold		Swing	+5.80	

=== 2014 Lok Sabha ===
2014 Indian general elections: Jhalawar-Baran
Party	Candidate	Votes	%	±%
BJP	Dushyant Singh	6,76,102	58.98	+9.76
INC	Pramod Jain Bhaya	3,94,556	34.42	−8.74
BSP	Chandra Singh	23,587	2.06	+0.18
NOTA	None of the Above	19,064	1.66	+1.66
BYS	Javed Khan	13,617	1.19	+1.19
IND.	Suleman Puta	11,602	1.01	−0.50
IND.	Baldar	7,836	0.68	+0.68
Majority		2,81,546	24.56	+18.50
Turnout		11,46,364	68.65	+8.40
BJP hold		Swing	+9.76	

=== 2009 Lok Sabha ===
2009 Indian general elections: Jhalawar-Baran
Party	Candidate	Votes	%	±%
BJP	Dushyant Singh	4,29,096	49.22	
INC	Urmila Jain Bhaya	3,76,255	43.16	
BSP	Abdul Qayyum Siddiqui	16,357	1.88	
IND.	Suleman Puta	13,167	1.51	
BHBP	Ghasi Lal Meghwal	10,500	1.20	
Independent	Laxman Kumar	6,125	0.70	
Independent	Shobha Devi	5,917	0.68	
Independent	Mohammad Rafiq	2,852	0.33	
Independent	Fazar Mohammad	2,584	0.30	
Independent	Abdul Farid	2,195	0.25	
Independent	Jhapat Mal	2,038	0.23	
Independent	Jagdish	1,703	0.20	
Independent	Dushyant Kumar	1,673	0.19	
Independent	Tara Chand	1,402	0.16	
Majority		52,841	6.06	
Turnout		8,71,864	60.25	
BJP win (new seat)				

== See also ==
- Jhalawar (Lok Sabha constituency)
- Jhalawar district
- Baran district
- List of constituencies of the Lok Sabha
