= Indira Rasoi =

Rajasthan initiative for food security

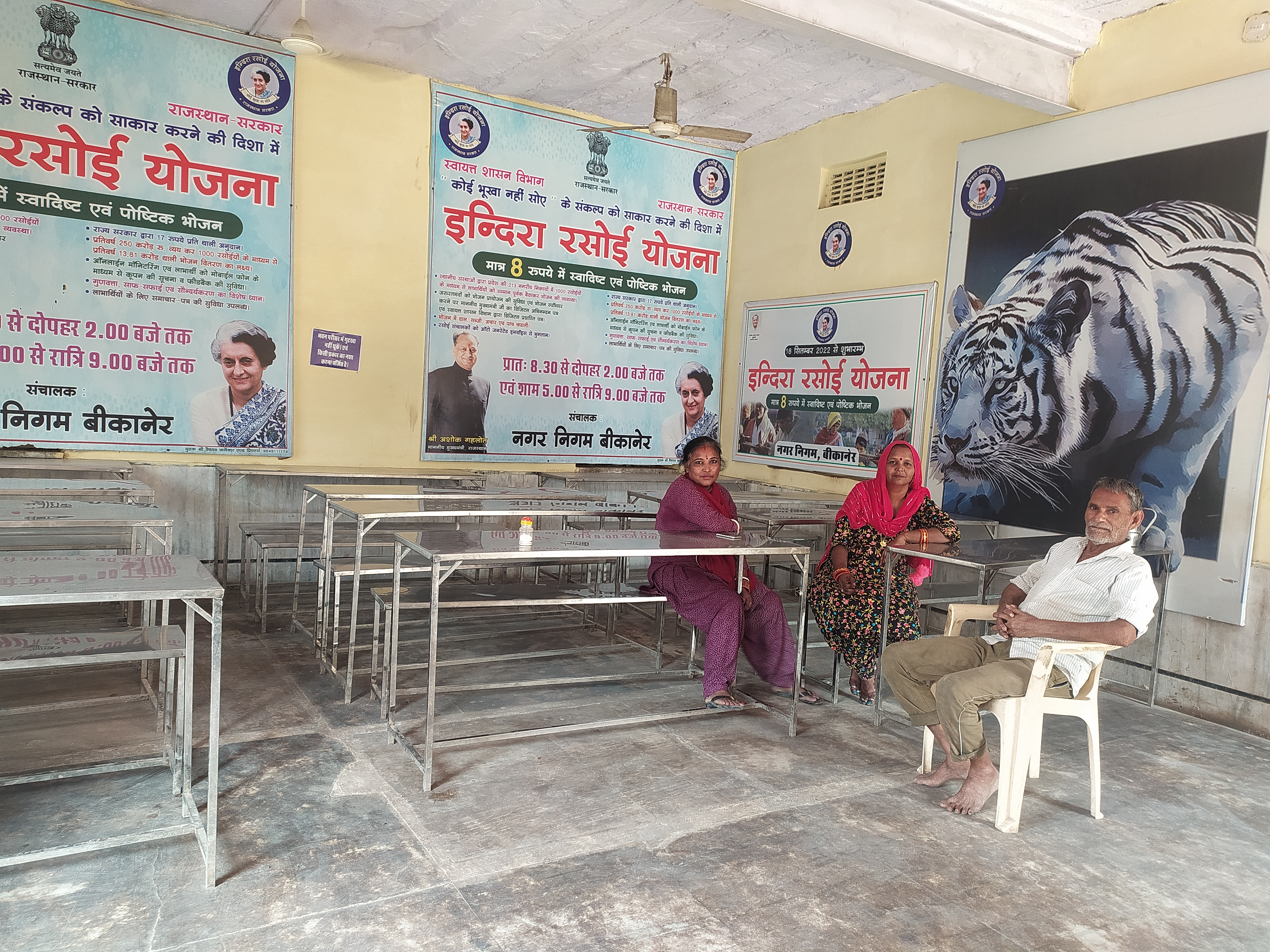
- Indira Rasoi in Bikaner, 2013
- Company type: Government-owned- Restaurant
- Industry: Restaurant services
- Genre: Indian Vegetarian Cuisine
- Founded: August 20, 2020; 5 years ago
- Founder: Ashok Gehlot
- Headquarters: JaipurJodhpurBikaner, India
- Number of locations: 1038
- Area served: Rajasthan
- Products: Food
- Services: Subsidised low cost food
- Revenue: Non-profit organisation
- Owner: Ministry of Food and Civil Supplies, Government of Rajasthan
- Number of employees: Not known.

The Indira Rasoi scheme provides subisidized food to anyone who wants it at Rs. 8 per meal in the Indian state of Rajasthan. The state began the program in August 2020 during the pandemic lockdown. The scheme began in 213 Urban Local Bodies and was expanded. Rasoi means kitchen in Hindi. The program is subsidized by the state government. The canteens get Rs. 17 from the state government per meal.

== Overview ==
The number of canteens increased from around 200 in 2020 to over 1000 in 2023. In the budget of 2023-23, the state government announced that the scheme would be expanded to rural areas. From 2020-2023, the canteens were in the various Urban Local Bodies (ULBs) of the state.

The canteens are located to easily reach people who might be in need of assistance. This includes bus stands, railway stations, night shelters, hospitals, university and college premises, krishi Mandis, fruit Mandis, vegetable Mandis, labour chocks (i.e., where daily wage labourers stand to wait for employers for the day) and so on.

Like its predecessors such as Amma Unavagam in Tamil Nadu, Indira canteens in Karnataka, and dal-bhaat kendras in Jharkhand, the scheme is popular. These community kitchens or canteens played a crucial role during the lockdowns. World over, food banks, canteens, community kitchens are critical in dealing with food insecurity.

Other state experiments include Anna Canteens in Andhra Pradesh, Jhunka Bhakar Kendras in Maharashtra, Aahar kendras in Odisha and Annapurna canteens in Chhattisgarh are some such initiatives in India

== See also ==
- Amma Unavagam, a similar scheme in Tamil Nadu
- Anna Canteen, a similar scheme in Andhra Pradesh
- Amma Kudineer
- Ahar Yojana, a similar scheme in Odisha
- Indira Canteens, a similar scheme in Karnataka
