= Third Gehlot ministry =

Government of Rajasthan, India (2018–2023)

- Ministry of Rajasthan
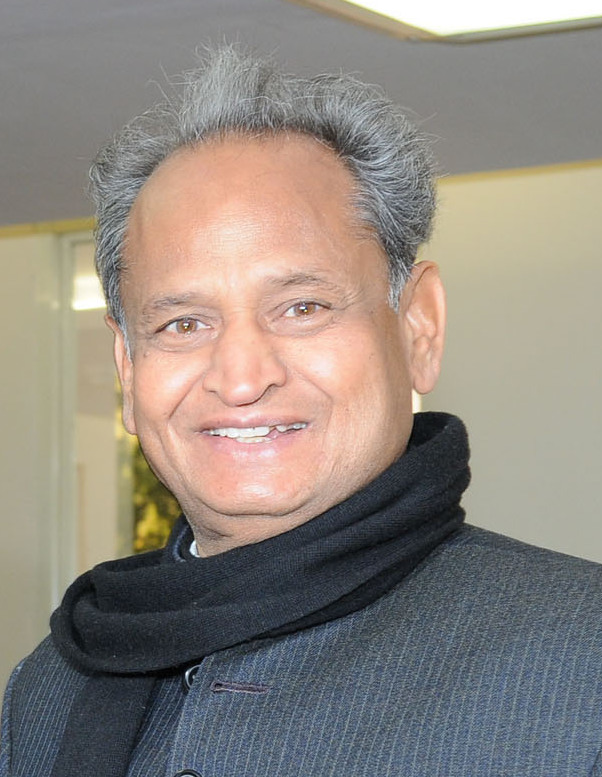
- Ashok Gehlot; Hon'ble Chief Minister of Rajasthan
- Date formed: 17 December 2018
- Date dissolved: 15 December 2023

People and organisations
- Head of state: Governor: Kalyan Singh (December 2018 – September 2019); Kalraj Mishra (Since September 2019)
- Head of government: Ashok Gehlot
- Ministers removed: 4
- Total no. of members: 29
- Member parties: INC; Independent(s)
- Status in legislature: Majority
- Opposition party: BJP
- Opposition leader: Rajendra Rathore (from 2023)

History
- Election: 2018
- Legislature term: 5 years
- Predecessor: Second Raje ministry
- Successor: Bhajan Lal Sharma ministry

The Third Ashok Gehlot ministry is the state cabinet of the Indian state of Rajasthan in the 15th Rajasthan Legislative Assembly headed by Chief Minister Ashok Gehlot.

== History ==
=== Inauguration ===
The results for the 2018 Rajasthan Legislative Assembly election were announced on 11 December 2022. The result was a hung house, with the Indian National Congress falling one seat short of a majority. With the help of three parties, the Bahujan Samaj Party, the Bharatiya Tribal Party and the Rashtriya Lok Dal (combined 9 seats) announced their outside support for the Congress party, resulting in the formation of a Congress government in Rajasthan.

On 17 December 2017, Ashok Gehlot took oath as chief minister of Rajasthan for his third term in Jaipur. Sachin Pilot also took oath as deputy chief minister.

=== 2020 Rajasthan political crisis ===
On 12 July 2020, around 19 members of the Rajasthan Legislative Assembly, as claimed by the then deputy chief minister of Rajasthan Sachin Pilot, flew to Delhi after disputes over different offices between rival factions of the Rajasthan Pradesh Congress Committee, triggering a month-long political crisis in the state of Rajasthan. The rebel faction led by Sachin Pilot claimed that they had the support of 30 MLAs and can topple the Ashok Gehlot-led Congress government in Rajasthan. He demanded the chief minister's post for which he was denied after the 2018 elections.

The Congress Legislature Party issued a whip to all its MLAs to be present in the meeting which was scheduled to be held at the Chief Minister's House or strict action would be taken against them. Meanwhile, Sachin Pilot reaffirmed that he won't be joining the BJP. By 14 July, with Pilot refusing to back down, Gehlot sacked him from his posts of deputy chief minister of Rajasthan and president of the Rajasthan Pradesh Congress Committee.

On 10 August, the event changed drastically, when Sachin Pilot met with Rahul Gandhi & Priyanka Gandhi. On the same day, rebel MLA Bhanwar Lal Sharma reached Jaipur and met with Chief Minister Ashok Gehlot. Sachin Pilot met Chief Minister Ashok Gehlot and finally, both the factions of the Rajasthan Pradesh Congress Committee reunited.

On 14 August, the political crisis officially ended with Ashok Gehlot-led Congress Government winning the trust vote in the Rajasthan Legislative Assembly through voice vote. All the MLAs of the Congress and its allies were present, although 73 BJP MLAs were not present.

== Major decisions ==
=== Agriculture ===
For the 2022-23 state budget, Ashok Gehlot announced the Rajasthan government launched the Krishak Sathi Yojana. In this scheme, financial assistance would be provided to farmers in case of death during agricultural activities or in case of partial or permanent disability. A separate budget for the agriculture sector was presented by Rajasthan Chief Minister Ashok Gehlot under the budget allocation of Krishi Sathi Yojana was increased to Rs 5000 crore.

=== Employment ===
On 1 April 2022, the government announced that it would increase the days of employment granted by the MGNREGA scheme from 100 to 125 days.

On 9 September 2022, the Congress government in Rajasthan launched the Indira Gandhi Shehari Rojgar Guarantee Yojana (Indira Gandhi Urban Employment Guarantee Scheme), in which those in the age group of 18–60 years residing within the limits urban local bodies would be able to demand at least 100 days of employment in a year.

The scheme was rolled out with the objective of providing economic support to the poor and needy living in the cities. Poor and destitute people, especially those who lost their livelihood during the pandemic would be given preference to the scheme. The Rajasthan government had allocated ₹800 crore ($97 million) for the scheme, as announced by chief minister Ashok Gehlot in the 2022-23 FY state budget.

=== Electricity ===
On 1 April 2022, the Rajasthan government announced free electricity up to 50 units to those consuming 100 units per month in Rajasthan. It also said that for all household consumers, the cost of ₹3 per unit for consumption up to 150 units and ₹2 per unit for consumption from 150-300 units will be bourn by the state government. The government claimed that around 1.18 crore (11.8 million) families were expected to benefit from this scheme.

=== Healthcare ===
On 1 April 2022, the government increased the insurance amount under its health insurance scheme Chiranjeevi from ₹5,00,000 to ₹10,00,000. It stated that 1.34 crore (13.4 million) families were expected to benefit from this scheme.

=== Indira Rasoi Scheme ===
The Indira Rasoi scheme provides meals for 8 rupees at centres in an effort to reduce hunger. The scheme was launched in August 2020 in urban areas. According to government data, as of September 2022 hundreds of centres existed, and had served 55 million meals; by March 2023, it was reported to have served 90 million meals from 950 centres. The program was characterized by the government's opposition as populist.

=== Old Pension Scheme ===
In the 2022-23 FY state budget, the Rajasthan government restored the Old Pension Scheme for government employees who joined the service on or after 1 January 2004 (when the NPS took effect).

=== Smartphones ===
The Rajasthan government launched the Digital Seva Yojana scheme in which women heads of 1.35 crore (13.5 million) families would be given a smartphone with free internet connectivity for three years. The phones would also support the two SIM feature and one SIM will already come activated in its ‘primary slot’, which cannot be changed. The project was estimated to be worth ₹12,000 crore ($1.45 billion) and state owned company Rajcomp is responsible for the implementation of the project.

== Council of Ministers ==
SI No.	Name	Constituency	Department	Party
1.	Ashok Gehlot; Chief Minister	Sardarpura	Finance; Taxation; Home & Justice; Dept. of Personnel; General Administration Dept.; Cabinet Secretariat; NRI; IT & Communication; Rajasthan State Investigation Bureau; DIPR	INC
2.	B. D. Kalla	Bikaner West	Education (Primary & Secondary); Sanskrit Education; Arts; Literature; Cultural & ASI	INC
3.	Shanti Dhariwal	Kota North	Local Self Government; Urban Development & Housing; Law & Legal Affairs; Legal Consultancy Office; Parliamentary Affairs; Elections	INC
4.	Udai Lal Anjana	Nimbahera	Cooperative; India Gandhi Canal Project	INC
5.	Parsadi Lal Meena	Lalsot	Medical & Health; Medical Health & Sciences (ESI); Excise	INC
6.	Lalchand Kataria	Jhotwara	Agriculture; Animal Husbandry; Fisheries	INC
7.	Mahesh Joshi	Hawa Mahal	PHED; Ground Water	INC
8.	Ramlal Jat	Mandal	Revenue	INC
9.	Pramod Jain Bhaya	Anta	Mines & Petroleum; Gopalan	INC
10	Vishvendra Singh	Deeg-Kumher	Tourism; Civil Aviation	INC
11.	Ramesh Chand Meena	Sapotra	Panchayati Raj; Rural development	INC
12.	Hemaram Choudhary	Gudha Malani	Forest	INC
13.	Pratap Singh Khachariyawas	Civil Lines	Food & Civil Supplies; Consumer affairs	INC
14.	Saleh Mohammad	Pokaran	Minority Affairs; Waqf; Colonisation; Agriculture Command Area; Development & Water Utilisation	INC
15.	Mamta Bhupesh	Sikrai	Women & Child Welfare; Child Rights; Planning	INC
16.	Bhajan Lal Jatav	Weir	PWD	INC
17.	Tika Ram Jully	Alwar Rural	Social Justice & Empowerment; Jail	INC
18.	Govind Ram Meghwal	Khajuwala	Disaster Management & Relief; Administrative Reforms; Coordination; Statistics; Policy Planning	INC
19.	Shakuntala Rawat	Bansur	Industry; State Enterprise; Devasthan	INC

== Minister of State ==
SI No.	Name	Constituency	Department	Party
1..	Bijendra Singh Ola	Jhunjhunu	Transport & Road Safety (Independent Charge)	INC
2.	Murari Lal Meena	Dausa	Agriculture Marketing (Independent Charge); Estate (Independent Charge); Tourism & Civil Aviation	INC
3.	Zahida Khan	Kaman	Science & Technology (Independent Charge); Printing & Stationery (Independent Charge); Education (Primary & Secondary); Arts; Literature; Culture & ASI	INC
4.	Arjun Singh Bamniya	Banswada	Tribal Area Dept. (Independent Charge); PHED; Ground Water	INC
5.	Ashok Chandna	Hindoli	Sports & Youth Affairs (Independent Charge); Skill (Independent Charge); Employment & Entrepreneurship (Independent Charge); DIPR; Disaster Management & Relief; Administrative Reforms & Coordination Dept.; Statistics; Policy Planning	INC
6.	Bhanwar Singh Bhati	Kolayat	Power (Independent Charge); Water Resources; IGNP; Water Resources Planning	INC
7.	Rajender Singh Yadav	Kotputli	Higher Education (Independent Charge); Planning (Manpower) (Independent Charge); State Motor Garage (Independent Charge); Language & Library (Independent Charge); Home & Justice	INC
8.	Sukhram Bishnoi	Sanchore	Labour (Independent Charge); Factory & Boiler inspection (Independent Charge); Revenue	INC
9.	Subhash Garg	Bharatpur	Technical Education (Independent Charge); Ayurveda & Indian Medicines (Independent Charge); Public Grivences & Redressal (Independent Charge); Minority Affairs; Waqf; Colonisation; Agriculture Command Area; Development & Water Utilisation	RLD

=== District Wise break up ===
Representation of cabinet ministers by district
1. Alwar (6.66%)
2. Banswara (6.66%)
3. Baran (3.33%)
4. Barmer (3.33%)
5. Bharatpur (13.3%)
6. Bikaner (10.0%)
7. Bundi (3.33%)
8. Dausa (10.0%)
9. Chittorgarh (3.33%)
10. Bhilwara (3.33%)
11. Jaipur (13.3%)
12. Jaisalmer (3.33%)
13. Jalore (3.33%)
14. Jhunjhunu (6.66%)
15. Jodhpur (3.33%)
16. Karauli (3.33%)
17. Kota (3.33%)

== Former Members ==
SI No.	Name	Constituency	Department	Tenure	Party	Reason
1.	Sachin Pilot; Deputy Chief Minister	Tonk	Public Works Department.; Rural Development & Panchayati Raj.; Science & Technology.; Statistics.	December 2018 – July 2020	INC	Dismissed by the Governor on the recommendation of the Chief Minister.
2.	Bhanwarlal Meghwal	Sujangarh	Social Justice and Empowerment.; Disaster Management & Relief.	December 2018 – November 2020	INC	Death.
3.	Harish Chaudhary	Baytu	Revenue.	December 2018 - November 2021	INC	Resigned Made AICC Incharge for Punjab.
4.	Raghu Sharma	Kekri	Health & Family Welfare.	December 2018 - November 2021	INC	Resigned Made AICC Incharge for Gujarat, Dadar & Nagar Haveli.
5.	Govind Singh Dotasra	Laxmangarh	Minister of State for Primary & Secondary Education.	December 2018 - November 2021	INC	Resigned Made Rajasthan INC Chief.
6.	Rajendra Singh Gudha	Udaipurwati	Minister of State of: Sainik Kalyan (Independent Charge); Home Guard & Civil Defence (Independent Charge); Panchayati Raj & Rural Development	December 2018 - July 2023	INC	Dismissed
