= Karaikal Chariot Festival =

Biggest chariot festival celebrated in Puducherry, India

Karaikal Chariot Festival is among the major temple car festivals or chariot festivals (ratha yatra) celebrated in Puducherry Union Territory, once a year. This chariot festival is celebrated for Lord Kailasanathar (Lord Shiva) in the Kailasanathar Temple of Karaikal. In this festival the chariot with the big idol of Lord Kailasanathar move through the streets of Karaikal city. The devotees holds the cord (வடம்) of the chariot and pulls it to the main streets of Karaikal city.

== Description ==
The city of Karaikal is famous for the various festivals celebrated for its important three temples, the Kailasanathar Temple, the Nithyakalyana Perumal Temple and the Karaikal Ammayar Temple. The most important festivals celebrated are the Karaikal Chariot festival, the Mangani festival and the Float festival. The Chariot festival is celebrated for Lord Kailasanathar and is considered significant in Karaikal. It is said that the Chariot festival is celebrated because the people who were busy with work and unable to worship Lord Kailasanathar can worship him while moving through the streets and get blessed by the lord. The Karaikal people came in thousands to worship the lord in the chariot and to pull the chariot.
