= Ramswaroop Kasana =

Indian politician

Ramswaroop kasana

Parliamentary Secretary
- In office 18 Nov 2011 – 2013
- Chief Minister: Ashok Gehlot

MLA, Rajasthan Legislative Assembly
- In office 2008–2013
- Preceded by: Subhash Chandra
- Succeeded by: Rajender Singh Yadav
- Constituency: Kotputli

Personal details
- Born: Putli Village, Kotputli, Rajasthan
- Party: Indian national congress(May 2024-Present)Rashtriya Loktantrik Party (2018 - 2024)
- Other political affiliations: Loktantrik Samajwadi Party (2008–2013)
- Spouse: Hemlata Kasana
- Occupation: Businessman, Farmer
- Profession: Politician, Agriculture
- Committees: Graduate

Ramswaroop Kasana is an Indian politician from the Rashatriya loktantrik party. He was a Member of Legislative Assembly (MLA) in Rajasthan Legislative Assembly from 2008 to 2013 and was the Parliamentary Secretary in the Government of Rajasthan.
