= Kailasanathar Temple, Karaikal =

Major temple in Karaikal, India

Coordinates: 10.9237°N 79.8328°E

Kailasanathar Temple (French : Pagode Caïlachanadar) is a Shaivite temple located in the downtown of Karaikal, India. It is among the prominent Hindu temples of the city, situated opposite to the famed Karaikal Ammaiyar Temple. The main deity worshipped at the temple, Shiva, is revered as Kailasanathar (transl. Lord of the Mount Kailash).

== History ==
The temple is believed to have been constructed before 2000 years ago which makes it the oldest temple in Karaikal district. It was reconstructed by the Pallavas in the 8th century and again in the French rule. The temple is constructed in a large complex surrounding it making it the largest temple complex of the famous temples in Karaikal city. The main attraction of the temple be the four elaborate doorways in each directions of the temple complex. The street where the temple located is named after the temple as Kailasanathar Kovil street.

== Sanctums in the Temple ==
The temple has sanctums for:

- Lord Kailasanathar
- Goddess Soundarambal
- Lord Nataraja
- Lord Dakshinamurthy
- Lord Vinayaga
- Different Lingas
- Two sanctums for Lord Muruga along with Goddess Devasena and Goddess Valli
- Goddess Saraswati
- Goddess Lakshmi
- Small statues of 63 nayanmars
- Goddess Durgai
- Lord Chandikeshwara
- Navagrahas

== Festivals ==
=== Mangani ===
The Mangani Festival is associated with both Kailasanathar Temple and Karaikal Ammaiyar Temple. The important figure of the Mangani festival, Lord Bikshatanamurthy is of the Kailasanathar Temple.

Ammaiyar was called as Mother (Amma) by Load Shiva (who is not having father or mother) since Lord Shiva called Ammaiyar as mother Shiva became native of Karaikal.

Also Lord Shiva has given the position to Ammaiyar to seat below his foot in Nataraja position which is given this position to only to Karaikal Ammaiyar punithavathi

=== Theppotsavam ===
The temple tank Chandra Theertham is associated with the main three temples of Karaikal. The Float festival (தெப்பத்திருவிழா) or Theppotsavam in Karaikal is conducted by both the Kailasanathar temple and the Nithyakalyana Perumal temple, at different dates. The celebrations idols of Lord Kailasanathar and his consort Soundarambal are taken in procession to the pond, where a festive float carries them for a circuit.

=== Rathotsavam ===
The chariot of Karaikal is dedicated to Kailasanathar Temple. The Karaikal Chariot festival is celebrated once a year. The idol of Lord Kailasanathar is taken in the chariot through the important streets of Karaikal. The cord of the chariot is held and pulled by the devotees to move the chariot forward.
