= Odisha Construction Corporation =

Construction Corporation based in Odisha

- Type: Government
- Industry: Construction
- Founded: 22 May 1962; 64 years ago
- Headquarters: Odisha Construction Corporation Building, Unit VIII, Gopabandhu Nagar, Bhubaneswar, Odisha, India
- Area served: Odisha
- Key people: Anu Garg; IAS, Chairman, Bibhuti Bhushan Das (Managing Director)
- Revenue: INR 4,50,58,39,661 .56
- Number of employees: 336
- Website: www.odishaconstruction.com

The Odisha Construction Corporation (OCC) (formerly known as Orissa Construction Corporation) is a premier Government of Odisha undertaking. Established in the year 1962 under the then Indian National Congress government of Biju Patnaik(fourth Chief Minister of Odisha) to undertake specialised civil and mechanical construction works hence creating an infrastructure base in the state of Odisha. The corporation was instituted under the third Five Year plan of the Government Odisha and was part of the 'big six' companies instituted along with the Industrial Development Corporation of Orissa, Orissa Fisheries Corporation, Orissa State Commercial Transport Corporation, Orissa Mining Corporation, Orissa Forest Corporation. It is headed by the principal secretary to government, water resources as ex-officio chairman.

The Odisha Construction Corporation is well equipped with machinery, equipment and vehicle to handle construction works and gives construction services for hydroelectric projects, irrigation projects, thermal power projects, industrial projects industrial buildings, bridges, harbors, railways and building projects.

== Completed projects ==
=== Hydroelectric projects ===
- Concrete, masonry & earth dams, tunnels, spillways, power house, hydraulic gates, steel penstock of Balimela, Upper Kolab, Rengali & Upper Indravati projects

=== Irrigation projects ===
- Barrages, canals & hydraulic structure of Mahanadi Barrage, Samal Barrage, Naraj Barrage & Harbhangi irrigation projects

=== Thermal power projects ===
- Power plants, water treatment plant & cooling towers of Talcher Thermal, IB Thermal & STPP (NTPC)

=== Industrial projects ===
- Industrial building & heavy fabricated structure of National Aluminium Company (NALCO), Hindustan Aeronautics Limited (HAL), Rourkela Steel Plant (RSP) & Neelachal Ispat Nigam Limited (NINL).

=== Bridges ===
- Balasore fly over, express highway & Kandal Bridge

=== Harbors ===
- Breakwater & berths of Paradip Port Trust

=== Railway projects ===
- Tunnel, fabricated steel bridge & embankment of Koraput-Rayagada Railway project

=== Buildings ===
- Residential, office, school & hospital buildings & cyclone shelters.

=== Roads ===
- PMGSY roads of RD Department

== Ongoing projects ==
- Lower Indra spillway, canals & gate works
- Titilagarh spillway & gate works
- Manjore spillway & gate works
- Kanupur spillway & gate works
- Telengiri irrigation (spillway & earth dam)
- Sagada Aqueduct of UIIP
- Rengali right bank canal
- Baghalati spillway, dam and gate works
- Subarnarekha Canal work
- Anandapur barrage gate works
- PMGSY road works
- Lower Suktel Spillway
- Ret Spillway
- Puri town water supply & drainage work
