= Pramod Jain Bhaya =

Indian politician

Cabinet Minister, Government of Rajasthan
- In office 24 December 2018 – 3 December 2023
- Governor: Kalyan Singh; Kalraj Mishra
- Chief Minister: Ashok Gahlot
- Ministry and Departments: List: Mine; Gopalan; Petroleum
- Preceded by: Surender Pal Singh
- Succeeded by: Bhajan Lal Sharma

Minister of State, Government of Rajasthan
- In office 28 February 2009 – 16 November 2011
- Governor: Prabha Rau; Shivraj Patil
- Chief Minister: Ashok Gahlot
- Ministry and Departments: List: Public Work (I/C); Science and Technology

Member of the Rajasthan Legislative Assembly
- Incumbent
- Assumed office 14 November 2025
- Preceded by: Kanwar Lal Meena
- In office 2018–2023
- Preceded by: Prabhu Lal Saini
- Succeeded by: Kanwar Lal Meena
- In office 2008–2013
- Preceded by: Constituency Established
- Succeeded by: Prabhu Lal Saini
- Constituency: Anta
- In office 2003–2008
- Preceded by: Shiv Narayan Nagar
- Succeeded by: Pana Chand Meghwal
- Constituency: Baran-Atru

Deputy District Head, Baran
- In office 2000–2003

Member Zila Parishad, Baran
- In office 1995–2003

Personal details
- Born: 8 December 1965 (age 60) Anta Rajasthan, India
- Party: Indian National Congress
- Spouse: Urmila Jain Bhaya

Pramod Jain Bhaya (born 8 December 1965) is an Indian politician. A member of the Indian National Congress, he is a Member of the Rajasthan Legislative Assembly from Anta. Previously, he served as cabinet minister for mines and cow rearing in the Ashok Gehlot ministry from 2018 to 2023. He has been elected to the Rajasthan Legislative Assembly for four terms from Anta constituency.

== Positions held ==
Year	Position
2003-08	Member, 12th Rajasthan Assembly from Baran-Atru Assembly constituency
2008-13	Member, 13th Rajasthan Assembly from Anta Assembly constituency: Cabinet Minister For Public Works Department, Government of Rajasthan
2018–2023	Member, Fifteenth Rajasthan Legislative Assembly from Anta Assembly constituency: Cabinet Minister For Mines Department, Government of Rajasthan; Cabinet Minister For Gaupalan Department, Government of Rajasthan
2025-incumbent	Member, 16th Rajasthan Assembly from Anta Assembly constituency
