= Nirmala Sahariya =

Indian politician (born 1976)

Member of the Rajasthan Legislative Assembly
- In office 2018–2023
- Preceded by: Lalit Meena
- Succeeded by: Lalit Meena
- Constituency: Kishanganj
- In office 2008–2013
- Preceded by: Hemraj Meena
- Succeeded by: Lalit Meena
- Constituency: Kishanganj

Personal details
- Born: 5 July 1976 (age 49)
- Party: Indian National Congress
- Occupation: Politician

Nirmala Sahariya was a member of the Rajasthan Legislative Assembly representing the Kishanganj constituency of Rajasthan. She won the 13th and 15th House Rajasthan Legislative Assembly election.
