= Kanwar Lal Meena =

Indian politician

Kanwarlal Meena

Member of the Rajasthan Legislative Assembly
- In office 3 December 2023 – 23 May 2025
- Preceded by: Pramod Jain Bhaya
- Succeeded by: Pramod Jain Bhaya
- Constituency: Anta
- In office 2013–2018
- Succeeded by: Govind Prasad
- Constituency: Manohar Thana

Personal details
- Party: Bharatiya Janata Party

Kanwar Lal Meena is an Indian politician who served as a Member of the Rajasthan Legislative Assembly (MLA) from the Anta constituency in Baran district, Rajasthan, representing the Bharatiya Janata Party (BJP). He previously served as an MLA from 2013 to 2018, representing the Manohar Thana constituency. He was convicted in December 2020 of threatening a public servant with a revolver and damaging property in a 2005 criminal case, for which he was sentenced to three years of imprisonment.

== Political career ==
Following the 2023 Rajasthan Legislative Assembly election, he was elected as an MLA from the Anta Assembly constituency, defeating Pramod Jain, the candidate from the Indian National Congress, by a margin of 5,861 votes.

== 2005 criminal case ==
Meena was convicted in a 2005 criminal case involving threatening government officials, obstructing public duty, and damaging property. A sessions court in Aklera sentenced him to three years of rigorous imprisonment in December 2020, which was upheld by the Rajasthan High Court in May 2025. The Supreme Court rejected his plea against this sentence on 7 May 2025, ordering him to surrender within two weeks. Meena surrendered in the ACJM Court of Manoharthana (Jhalawar) on 21 May 2025. Meena was disqualified from the Rajasthan Legislative Assembly on 23 May 2025.
