= Vikram Bansiwal =

Indian politician

Member of the Rajasthan Legislative Assembly
- Incumbent
- Assumed office 3 December 2023
- Preceded by: Mamta Bhupesh
- Constituency: Sikrai

Personal details
- Born: 25 June 1980 (age 45) Aluda Sikrai, Dausa district, Rajasthan
- Party: Bhartiya Janata Party
- Parent(s): Jiyalal Bansiwal (father); Kaushalya Devi (mother)
- Education: Bachelor of Arts
- Alma mater: University of Rajasthan
- Profession: Business

Vikram Bansiwal (born 25 June 1980) is an Indian politician Currently Serving as a Member of the 16th Rajasthan Legislative Assembly, representing the Sikrai Assembly constituency. He is member of the Bharatiya Janata Party.
