= Amma Unavagam =

Food subsidization program in Tamil Nadu, India

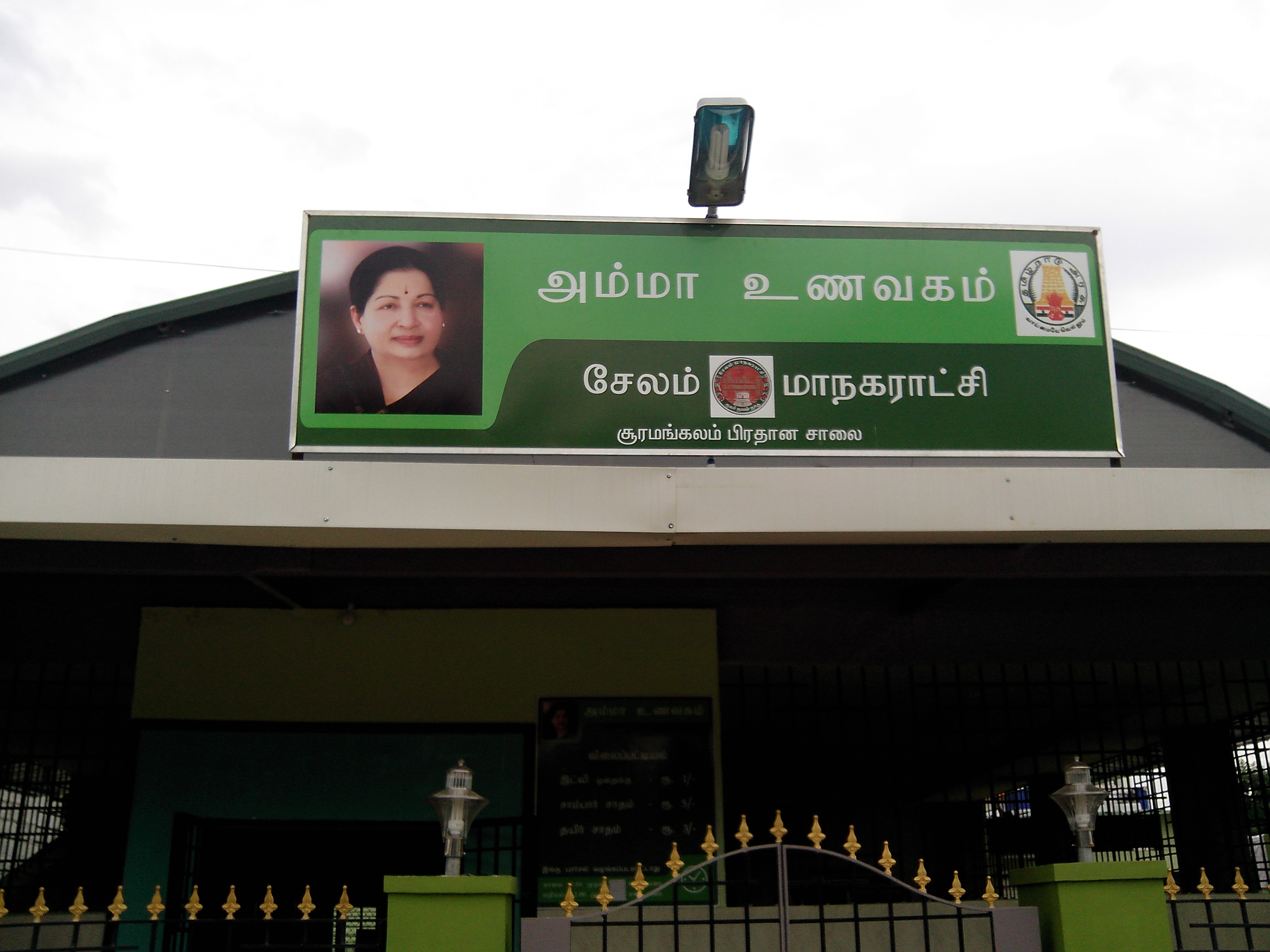
- Type: Government-owned- Restaurant
- Industry: Restaurant services
- Genre: South Indian Vegetarian Cuisine
- Founded: February 19, 2013; 13 years ago
- Founder: J. Jayalalithaa
- Headquarters: Chennai, India
- Number of locations: 407
- Area served: Tamil Nadu
- Products: Food
- Services: Subsidised low cost food
- Revenue: Non-profit organisation
- Owner: Ministry of Food and Civil Supplies, Government of Tamil Nadu
- Number of employees: 4,500

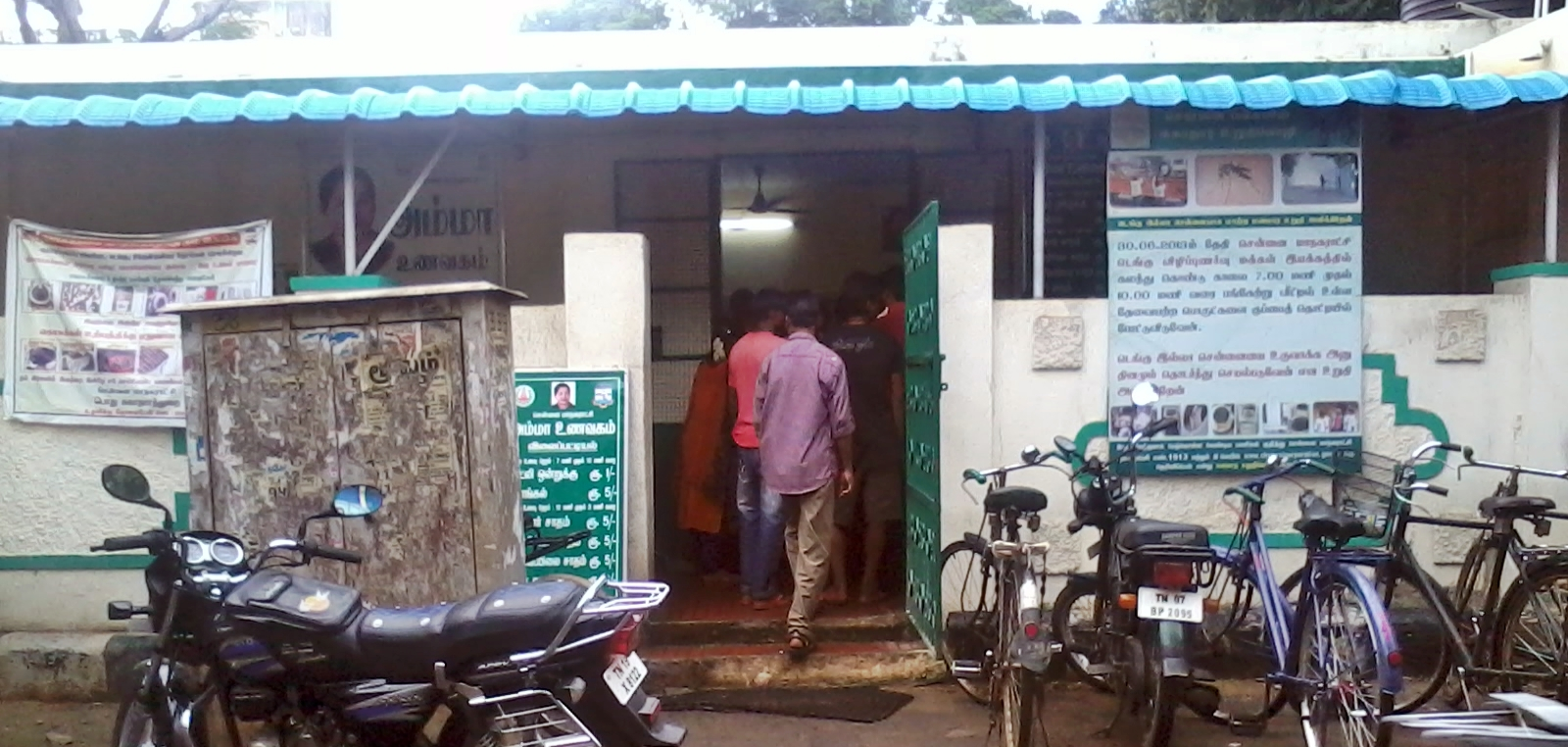
An Amma Unavagam outlet in Adyar, Chennai

Amma Unavagam (Tamil: அம்மா உணவகம்) is a food subsidisation programme run by the Ministry of Food and Civil Supplies, Government of Tamil Nadu in India.

Under the scheme, municipal corporations of the state-run canteens serving subsidised food at low prices. The genesis of the scheme could be traced to the concept of rural restaurants promoted by Nimbkar Agricultural Research Institute.

== About the name ==
The literal meaning of the name of the scheme Amma Unavagam is Mother's canteen. Amma translates to mother in Tamil, but is also a reference to the former chief minister of Tamil Nadu J. Jayalalithaa, who introduced this restaurant chain as part of government schemes aimed at aiding economically disadvantaged sections of society.

== About the scheme ==
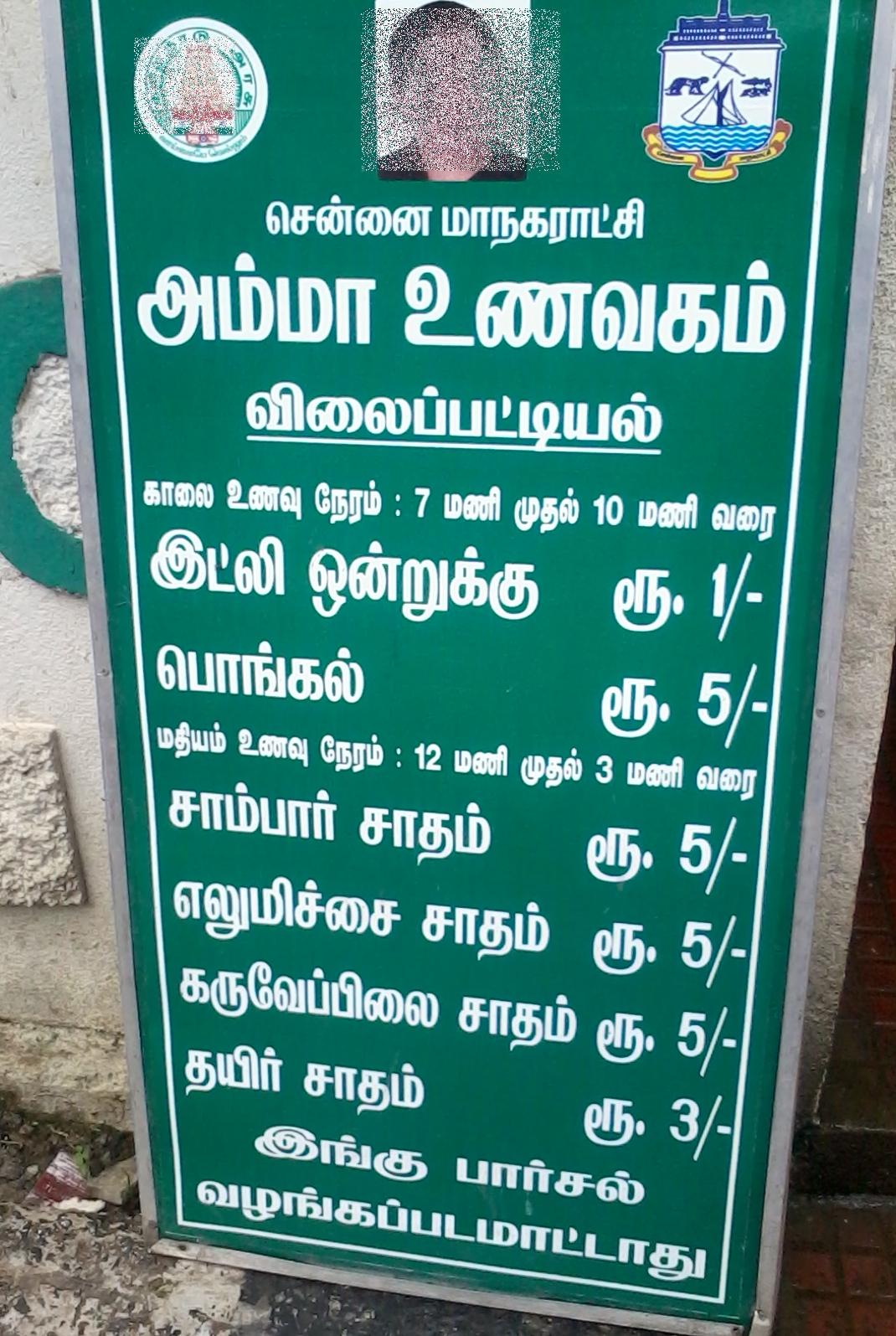
Menu displayed in front of a canteen in Adyar, Chennai

The scheme requires municipal corporations in the state to establish canteens at multiple places in cities and sell subsidised food at very low prices. The first canteens were opened in several localities of Chennai, and later in other corporations of the state. Three of the ten canteens in Coimbatore are partially solar-powered.

== Menu and prices ==
The food chains primarily serve South Indian food including idli, saambar rice, curd rice, pongal, lemon rice, curry leaf rice and also chappathi. The dishes are offered at low prices: ₹1 for an idli, ₹5 for a plate of pongal, ₹5 for a plate of sambar rice, ₹5 for a plate of "Karuvapellai Satham" (Curry leaves rice) and ₹3 for a plate of curd rice.

== Controversies ==
It has been reported that massive losses are incurred by corporations by offering food at very low rates. As an example, the Coimbatore Municipal Corporation reported a loss of approximately ₹2.64 for an idli, ₹9.73 for a unit of sambar rice and ₹4.44 for a unit of curd rice, incurring a total loss of about ₹2.70 crore (US$280,000) a year. There was opposition in Tirunelveli to the appropriation of governments funds to this scheme. Concerns were also raised about the effects subsidised canteens can have on pushcart eateries, importantly that small business ventures may not be able to withstand competition from government subsidised low-cost canteens on a long-term basis.

== List of Amma Unavagams ==
- In Chennai
- Kanchipuram District /
- Thiruvallur District / Gummidipoondi

== See also ==
- Amma Kudineer
- Anna Canteen, a similar scheme in Andhra Pradesh
- Ahar Yojana, a similar scheme in Odisha
- Indira Canteens, a similar scheme in Karnataka
