= Mamta Bhupesh =

Indian politician

Mamta Bhupesh Bairwa

Cabinet Minister, Government of Rajasthan
- In office 21 November 2021 – 03 December 2023
- Governor: Kalraj Mishra
- Chief Minister: Ashok Gahlot
- Ministry and Departments: List: Women and Child Development; Child Empowerment; Administrative Reforms and Coordination; Planning
- Preceded by: Self
- Succeeded by: Diya Kumari

Minister of State, Government of Rajasthan
- In office 24 December 2018 – 20 November 2021
- Governor: Kalyan Singh; Kalraj Mishra
- Chief Minister: Ashok Gahlot
- Ministry and Departments: List: Women and Child Development (Independent Charge); Minority Affairs; Public Prosecution; Waqf
- Preceded by: Anita Bhadel
- Succeeded by: Self

Parliamentary Secretary, Government of Rajasthan
- In office 17 November 2011 – 9 December 2013

Member of the Rajasthan Legislative Assembly
- In office 2018–2023
- Preceded by: Geeta Verma
- Succeeded by: Vikram Bansiwal
- In office 2008–2013
- Constituency: Sikrai

Personal details
- Born: 28 June 1973 (age 52) Islampur, Jhunjhunu, Rajasthan, India
- Party: Indian National Congress
- Spouse: Dr. Ghanshyam Bairwa
- Children: 2
- Parent(s): Amichand Bhupesh Bairwa (father); Saraswati Bhupesh Bairwa (mother)
- Education: B.A. & M.B.A.
- Alma mater: University of Rajasthan & Vinayaka Mission's University
- Occupation: Politician
- Profession: Agriculture

Mamta Bhupesh Bairwa (born 28 June 1973) is an Indian politician and former serving Cabinet Minister for Women and Child Development, Child Empowerment, Administrative Reforms and Coordination, Planning Department in Government of Rajasthan and Minister of State for Women and Child Development (Independent Charge), Minority Affairs, Public Prosecution, Waqf Department in Government of Rajasthan. She is 13th & 15th Member of the Rajasthan Legislative Assembly from Sikrai. She is former serving Parliamentary Secretary in Government of Rajasthan. She is Member of the Indian National Congress.
