= Karaikal Ammaiyar Temple =

Hindu temple in Karaikal, Puducherry, India

Coordinates: 10.9238°N 79.8322°E

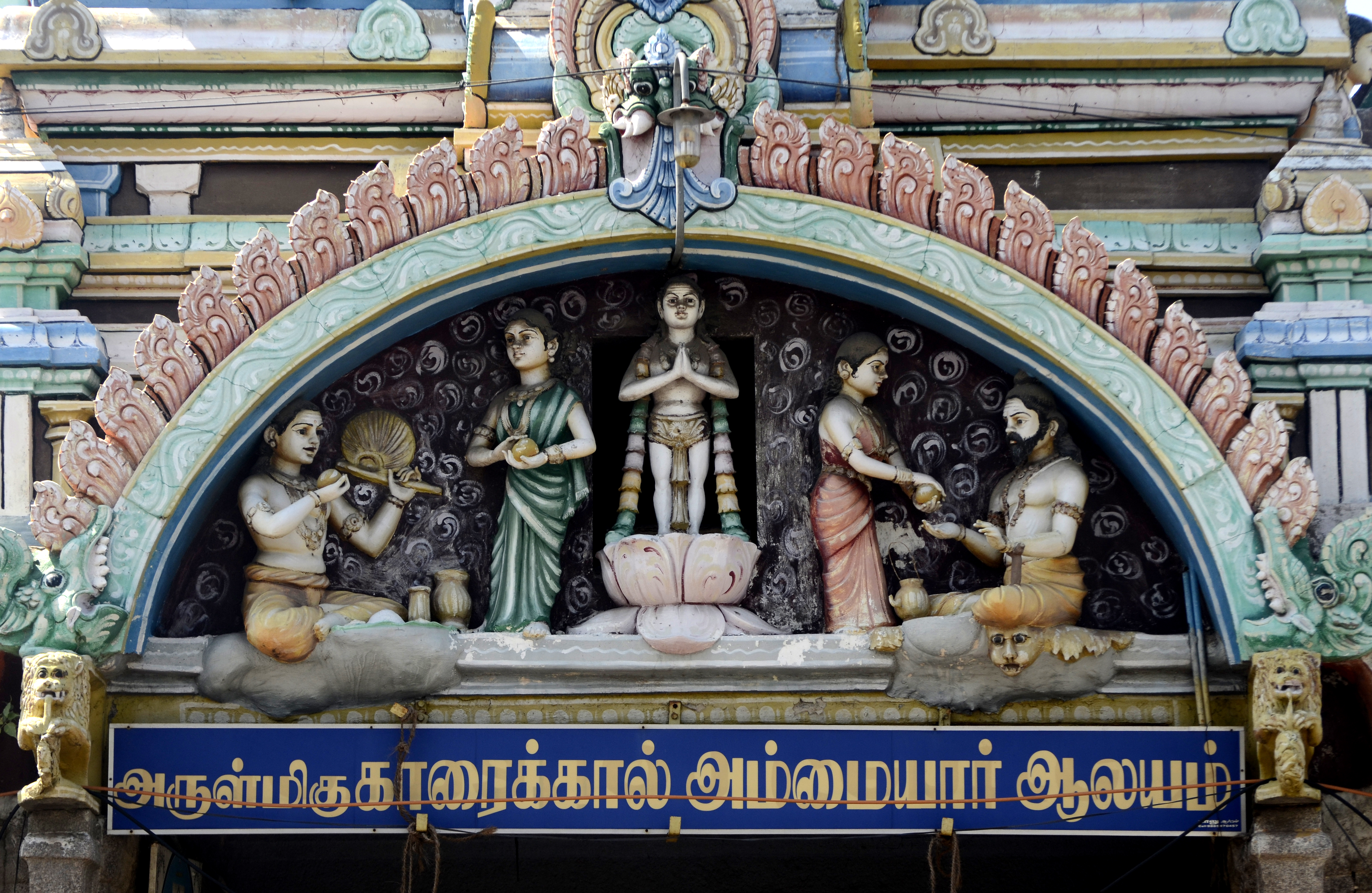
Photograph of Karaikal Ammaiyar Temple

Karaikal Ammaiyar Temple (French : Pagode Somanadassamy or Pagode Karikal Amméar) is a Hindu temple dedicated to the Shaivite saint or Nayanmar Punithavathi, more famously known as Karaikal Ammaiyar (transl. The revered mother of Karaikal). It is located on Bharathiar Street (Formerly the Rue de Poréar, or Poraiyar Street), in the center of Karaikal city, in India.

== History ==
The current temple was constructed by Malaiperumal Pillai in 1929. The main worship at the temple is done for Punithavati or Karaikkal Ammaiyar. The temple is also dedicated to Somanathar (Shiva) and Somanayaki, and comports also a sanctum for Vinayaka. Karaikal Ammaiyar is considered to be one of the sixty three saints of the Saiva Siddhanta tradition, known as the nayanmar. She is among the most ancient figures among them, as well as the leading female. She was born to Dhanathathanar, from a merchant community knows as the Chettiar, possibly among the Nattukottai Nagarathar or Nattukottai Chettiars.

== Festival ==
The Mangani Tirunal (The festival of the mango fruit in Tamil, or Mangani Festival, known in French as Fête des mangues) is observed in the Tamil month of Aani on the full moon day. The belief is that Karaikal Ammaiyar gave Annam (food) to Bhikshatanar during his tour around the world begging alms. Since she gave him curd rice and mangoes, those items are distributed on the festival day, in a big hall adjacent to the temple.

== Nearby Places ==
1. Karaikal Kailasanathar Temple
2. Nithyakalyana Perumal Temple
3. Chandra Theertham tank

== See also ==
- Karaikal district
