= Kishanganj, Rajasthan Assembly constituency =

Legislative Assembly constituency in Rajasthan State, India

Coordinates: 25.12°N 76.63°E

Kishanganj - Shahbad
- Constituency No. 194 for the Rajasthan Legislative Assembly

Constituency details
- Country: India
- Region: North India
- State: Rajasthan
- District: Baran
- Lok Sabha constituency: Jhalawar–Baran
- Established: 1967
- Total electors: 231,679
- Reservation: ST

Member of Legislative Assembly
- 16th Rajasthan Legislative Assembly
- Incumbent Lalit Meena
- Party: BJP

Kishanganj Assembly constituency is one of the 200 Legislative Assembly constituencies of Rajasthan state in India.

It is part of Baran district and is reserved for candidates belonging to the Scheduled Tribes.

== Members of the Legislative Assembly ==
| Year | Member | Party |
|---|---|---|
| 1967 | N. Lal | Bharatiya Jana Sangh |
| 1972 | Ram Gopal | Indian National Congress |
| 1977 | Narangi Devi | Janata Party |
| 1980 | Har Sahai Meena | Indian National Congress |
| 1985 | Heera Lal Sahariya | Independent politician |
| 1990 | Hemraj Meena | Bharatiya Janata Party |
| 1993 | Heera Lal Sahariya | Independent politician |
| 1998 | Heera Lal Sahariya | Indian National Congress |
| 2003 | Hemraj Meena | Independent politician |
| 2008 | Nirmala Sahariya | Indian National Congress |
| 2013 | Lalit Meena | Bharatiya Janata Party |
| 2018 | Nirmala Sahariya | Indian National Congress |
| 2023 | Lalit Meena | Bharatiya Janata Party |

== Election results ==
=== 2023 ===
Rajasthan Legislative Assembly Election, 2023: Kishanganj
| Party | Candidate | Votes | % | ±% |
|---|---|---|---|---|
| BJP | Lalit Meena | 101,857 | 53.43 | +10.11 |
| INC | Nirmala Sahariya | 79,576 | 41.74 | −9.9 |
| NOTA | None of the above | 2,322 | 1.22 | −0.57 |
| Majority | | 22,281 | 11.69 | +3.37 |
| Turnout | | 190,636 | 82.28 | +2.37 |
| BJP gain from INC | | Swing | | |

=== 2018 ===
Rajasthan Legislative Assembly Election, 2018: Kishanganj
| Party | Candidate | Votes | % | ±% |
|---|---|---|---|---|
| INC | Nirmala Sahariya | 87,765 | 51.64 | |
| BJP | Lalit Meena | 73,629 | 43.32 | |
| BSP | Radhakishan Meena | 2,193 | 1.29 | |
| NOTA | None of the above | 3,034 | 1.79 | |
| Majority | | 14,136 | 8.32 | |
| Turnout | | 169,950 | 79.91 | |
| INC gain from BJP | | Swing | | |

=== 2013 ===
Rajasthan Legislative Assembly Election, 2013: Kishanganj
| Party | Candidate | Votes | % | ±% |
|---|---|---|---|---|
| BJP | Lalit Meena | 64,442 | 46.08 | |
| INC | Chhatri Bai | 51,460 | 36.80 | |
| Independent | Bharat Maran | 9,101 | 6.51 | |
| Independent | Neeraj Meena | 5,695 | 4.07 | |
| NOTA | None of the Above | 3,400 | 2.43 | |
| BJP gain from INC | | Swing | | |

=== 2008 ===
Rajasthan Legislative Assembly Election, 2008: Kishanganj
| Party | Candidate | Votes | % | ±% |
|---|---|---|---|---|
| INC | Nirmala Sahariya | 52,578 | 51.57 | |
| BJP | Hemraj Meena | 36,200 | 35.51 | |
| BSP | Jagdish | 3589 | 3.52 | |
| Independent | Sobha | 3349 | 3.28 | |

== See also ==
- List of constituencies of the Rajasthan Legislative Assembly
- Baran district
