= Indira Canteens =

Fast-food chain in Bengaluru, India

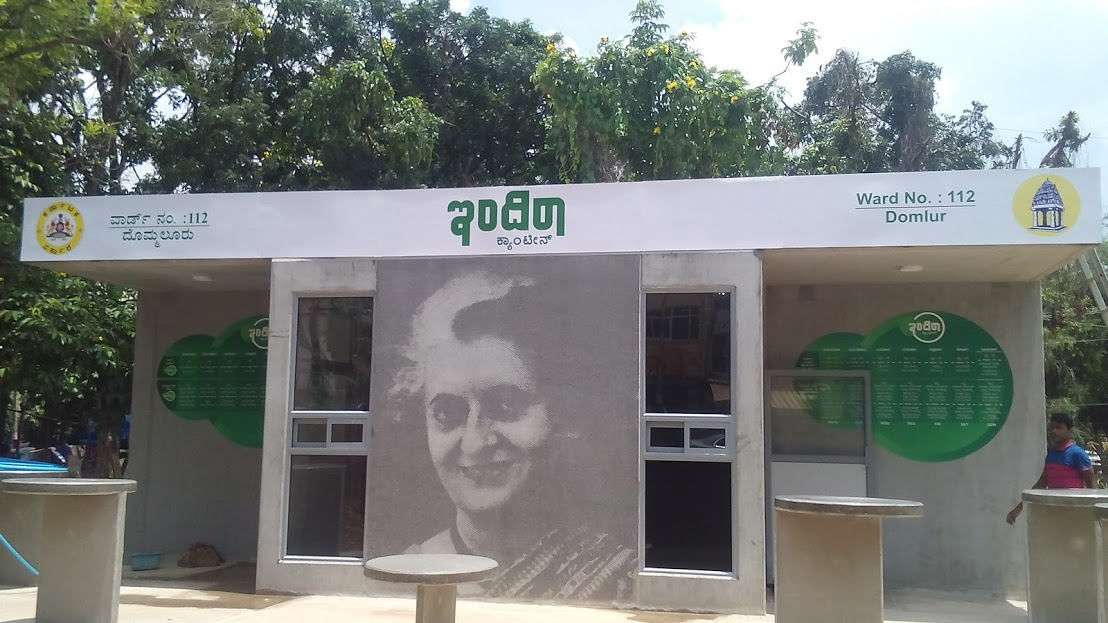
- Indira Canteen at Domlur
- Native name: ಇಂದಿರಾ ಕ್ಯಾಂಟೀನ್
- Type: Government-Restaurant
- Industry: Food
- Genre: South Indian Vegetarian Cuisine
- Founded: 15 August 2017 (9 years ago); Bangalore, Karnataka, India.
- Founder: Siddaramaiah cabinet and Siddaramaiah
- Headquarters: Bangalore, India
- Area served: Karnataka
- Products: Food
- Services: Subsidized low cost food
- Revenue: Non-profit organization
- Owner: Ministry of Food, Civil Supplies and Consumer affairs, Government of Karnataka
- Parent: Government of Karnataka
- Website: Indira Canteen
- Footnotes named after Indira Gandhi

Indira Canteen is a food subsidisation programme run by the Ministry of Food, Civil Supplies and Consumer affairs, Government of Karnataka. It inspired from the Amma Unavagam of Tamilnadu. It is named after Indira Gandhi, the first and only female Prime Minister of India.

Indira canteens slowly became defunct once the Congress party lost power in the state. Since it returned to power in 2023, there have been attempts and news of reviving the canteens

The canteens are part funded from the state budget and partly from the budgets of the civic bodies. Earlier, the state government contributed 70% of the costs whereas now its share is likely to fall to 50% in Bengaluru.

== Structure ==
The canteens serving food in civic wards of districts and taluka places of Karnataka. The canteen serves breakfast, lunch, and dinners. Aimed at aiding economically disadvantaged sections of society at a subsidized price.

== Food items ==
Idlis and coconut chutney along with variety rice of the day will be served in breakfast, for lunch and dinner, rice, sambar, curd rice, tomato bath, and a few other items will be served.

== List of canteens in Karnataka ==
The largest number of canteens are in Bangalore, almost 200. A relatively up to date (as of November 2023) can be found on the Open City Data website.

== Similar initiatives in other states ==
In Kerala, Kochi Municipal Corporation launched a subsidised public meal initiative under the name "Indira Canteen" as part of its urban welfare programmes. The initiative provides affordable meals through designated outlets and operates independently of the Karnataka state government’s Indira Canteen scheme.
