= Dag Assembly constituency =

Legislative Assembly constituency in Rajasthan State, India

Coordinates: 23.93°N 75.84°E

Dag
- Constituency No. 197 for the Rajasthan Legislative Assembly

Constituency details
- Country: India
- Region: North India
- State: Rajasthan
- District: Jhalawar
- Lok Sabha constituency: Jhalawar–Baran
- Established: 1972
- Total electors: 264,695
- Reservation: SC

Member of Legislative Assembly
- 16th Rajasthan Legislative Assembly
- Incumbent Kaluram Meghwal
- Party: Bharatiya Janata Party
- Elected year: 2023

Dag Assembly constituency is one of the 200 Legislative Assembly constituencies of Rajasthan state in India.

It is part of Jhalawar district and is reserved for candidates belonging to the Scheduled Castes. As of 2023, it is represented by Kaluram Meghwal of the Bharatiya Janata Party.

== Members of the Legislative Assembly ==
Election	Name	Party
2008	Madanlal	Indian National Congress
2013	Ramchandra	Bharatiya Janata Party
2018	Kaluram Meghwal	Bharatiya Janata Party
2023	Kaluram Meghwal	Bharatiya Janata Party

== Election results ==
=== 2023 ===
2023 Rajasthan Legislative Assembly election: Dag
Party	Candidate	Votes	%	±%
BJP	Kaluram Meghwal	99,251	46.56	▼5.77
INC	Chetraj Gehlot	76,990	36.12	▼6.36
Independent	Ramchandra Sunariwal	23,701	11.12	
ASP(KR)	Badrilal	4,241	1.99	
AAP	Anil	3,539	1.66	
BSP	Daluram	2,219	1.04	▼0.01
NOTA	None of the above	3,225	1.51	▼0.63
Majority		22,261	10.44	▲0.59
Turnout		213,166	80.53	▲0.58
BJP hold		Swing	▲0.59	

=== 2018 ===
2018 Rajasthan Legislative Assembly election: Dag
Party	Candidate	Votes	%	±%
BJP	Kaluram Meghwal	103,665	52.33	
INC	Madan Lal	84,152	42.48	
API	Vikram Lal Dasauriya	2,875	1.45	
BSP	Ramswaroop	2,078	1.05	
NOTA	None of the above	4,247	2.14	
Majority		19,513	9.85	
Turnout		198,088	79.95	
BJP hold		Swing	▼19.78	

=== 2013 ===
2013 Rajasthan Legislative Assembly election: Dag
Party	Candidate	Votes	%	±%
BJP	Ramchandra	103,113	60.62%	+17.03%
INC	Madan Lal	52,716	30.99%	−12.60%
NOTA	None of the Above	3,689	2.17%	+2.17%
BSP	Daluram	3,109	1.83%	−1.57%
NPP	Snehlata	1,789	1.05%	N/A
Independent	Mohan Lal	1,525	0.90%	N/A
Majority		50,397	29.63%	28.32%
Turnout		1,70,106	80.08%	+10.40%
BJP gain from INC		Swing	▲29.63	

=== 2008 ===
2008 Rajasthan Legislative Assembly election: Dag
Party	Candidate	Votes	%	±%
INC	Madan Lal	58,537	44.90%	+4.97%
BJP	Ram Lal	56,828	43.59%	−11.17%
BSP	Nathu Lal	4,427	3.40%	N/A
BJSH	Arvind Singh	4,215	3.23%	N/A
ABCD	Ramkaran	4,207	3.23%	N/A
BBP	Nathu Lal	4,427	3.40%	N/A
Majority		1,701	1.31%	−16.14%
Turnout		1,30,364	69.64%	+1.05%
INC gain from BJP		Swing	▲1.31	

== See also ==
- List of constituencies of the Rajasthan Legislative Assembly
- Jhalawar district
