= Rajender Singh Yadav =

Indian politician

Minister of State for Higher education Government of Rajasthan
- In office 21 November 2021 – 3 December 2023
- Chief Minister: Ashok Gehlot
- Department: 1. Minister of State for Power. (Independent Charge); 2. Planning (Manpower) (Independent Charge); 3. State Motor Garage (Independent Charge); 4. Language & Library (Independent Charge); 5. Home & Justice
- Succeeded by: Jawahar Singh Bedham

Member of the Rajasthan Legislative Assembly
- In office 2013–2023
- Preceded by: Ramswaroop Kasana
- Succeeded by: Hansraj Patel
- Constituency: Kotputli

Personal details
- Party: Bharatiya Janata Party (2024- Present)
- Other political affiliations: Indian National Congress (till 2024)
- Profession: Politician

Rajender Singh Yadav is a Rajasthan politician. He formerly served as Minister of State Government of Rajasthan.

== Early life ==
Rajendra Singh Yadav was born to Ramjilal Yadav.

== Career ==
He served as Member of Rajasthan Legislative Assembly from Kotputli constituency. He became Minister of Motor Garage, Language and Social Justice.

In the 2018 Rajasthan Legislative Assembly election he won with a margin of 13,876 votes.

== Ministries ==
- Higher Education (Independent Charge)
- Planning (Manpower) (Independent Charge)
- State Motor Garage (Independent Charge)
- Language & Library (Independent Charge)
- Home & Justice
