= Manohar Thana Assembly constituency =

Legislative Assembly constituency in Rajasthan State, India

Coordinates: 24.24°N 76.81°E

Manohar Thana
- Constituency No. 200 for the Rajasthan Legislative Assembly

Constituency details
- Country: India
- Region: North India
- State: Rajasthan
- District: Jhalawar
- Lok Sabha constituency: Jhalawar–Baran
- Established: 1976
- Total electors: 266,509
- Reservation: None

Member of Legislative Assembly
- 16th Rajasthan Legislative Assembly
- Incumbent Govind Prasad
- Party: Bharatiya Janata Party
- Elected year: 2023

Manohar Thana is one of the 200 Legislative Assembly constituencies of Rajasthan state in India.

The constituency was created by The Delimitation of Parliamentary and Assembly Constituencies Order, 1976. It had its first election in 1977. As of the latest delimitation in 2008, it consists of Asnawar ILRC of Jhalrapatan tehsil, and all of Manohar Thana and Aklera tehsils of Jhalawar district.

== Members of the Legislative Assembly ==
Year	Member	Party
1990	Jagannath	Bharatiya Janata Party
1993	Jagannath	Bharatiya Janata Party
1998	Jagannath	Bharatiya Janata Party
2003	Jagannath	Bharatiya Janata Party
2008	Kailash Chandra Meena	Indian National Congress
2013	Kanwar Lal Meena	Bharatiya Janata Party
2018	Govind Prasad	Bharatiya Janata Party
2023	Govind Prasad	Bharatiya Janata Party

== Election results ==
=== 2023 ===
2023 Rajasthan Legislative Assembly election: Manohar Thana
Party	Candidate	Votes	%	±%
BJP	Govind Prasad	85,304	37.82	−15.59
Independent	Kailash Chand	60,439	26.8	
INC	Nemichand Meena	38,429	17.04	−25.77
Independent	Roshan Singh	27,766	12.31	
BTP	Rajkumar	6,345	2.81	
BSP	Chander Singh	2,275	1.01	
NOTA	None of the above	3,199	1.42	−0.09
Majority		24,865	11.02	+0.42
Turnout		225,524	84.62	−0.53
BJP hold		Swing		

=== 2018 ===
Rajasthan Legislative Assembly Election, 2018: Manohar Thana
Party	Candidate	Votes	%	±%
BJP	Govind Prasad	110,215	53.41	
INC	Kailash chand	88,346	42.81	
NOTA	None of the above	3,117	1.51	
Majority		21,869	10.6	
Turnout		206,374	85.15	

== See also ==
- List of constituencies of the Rajasthan Legislative Assembly
- Jhalawar district
