= Ahar Yojana =

Food subsidisation program in the India state of Odisha

Aahaaraw Jojawnaa
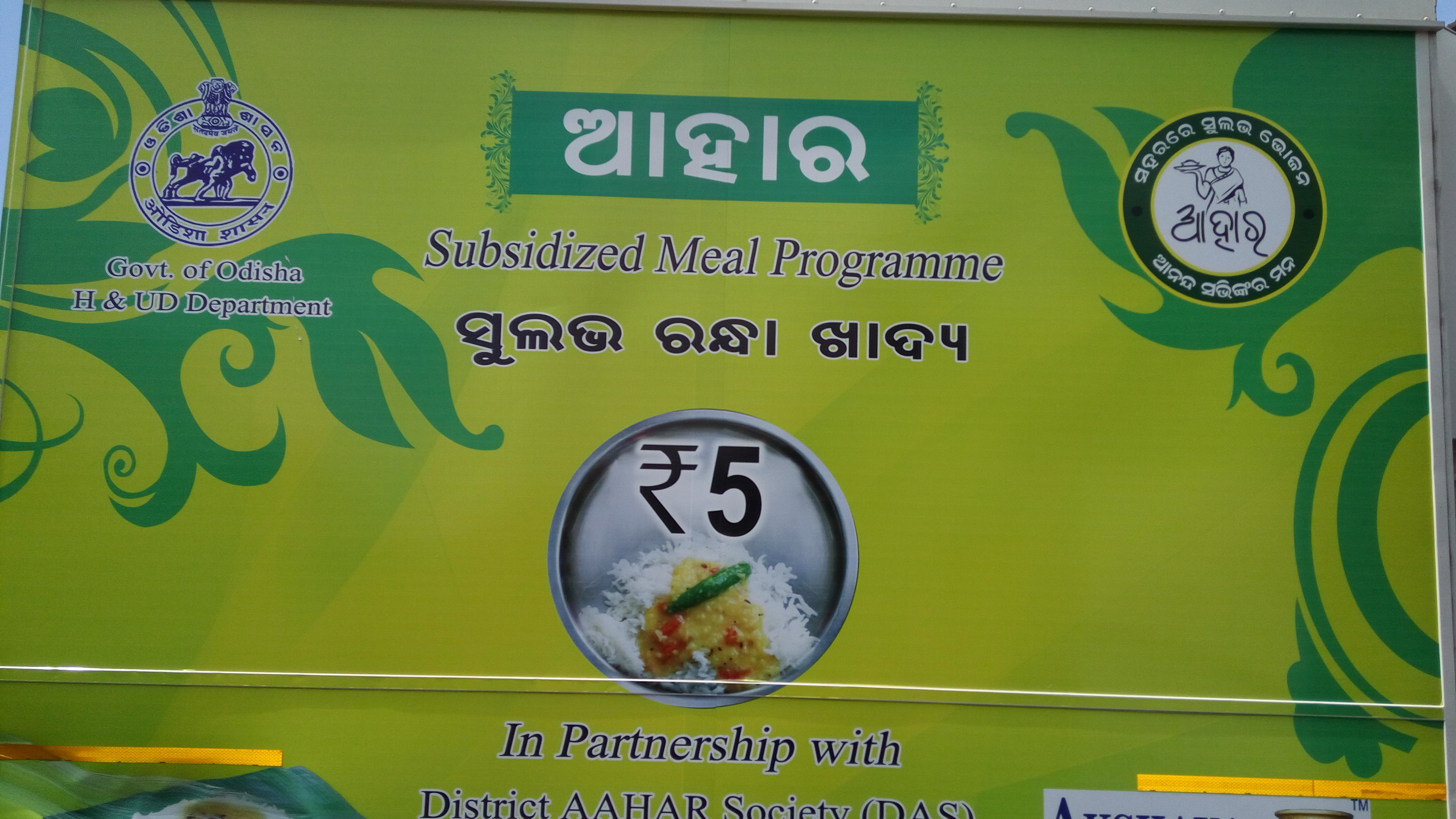
- Type: Government-Restaurant
- Founded: 2015
- Founder: Government of Odisha
- Area served: Odisha
- Key people: Nabin Patnaik
- Products: Food
- Revenue: Non - Profit Organization
- Owner: Ministry of Food Supplies & Consumer Welfare, Co-operation, Government of Odisha
- Website: http://164.100.141.236/AAHAAR/

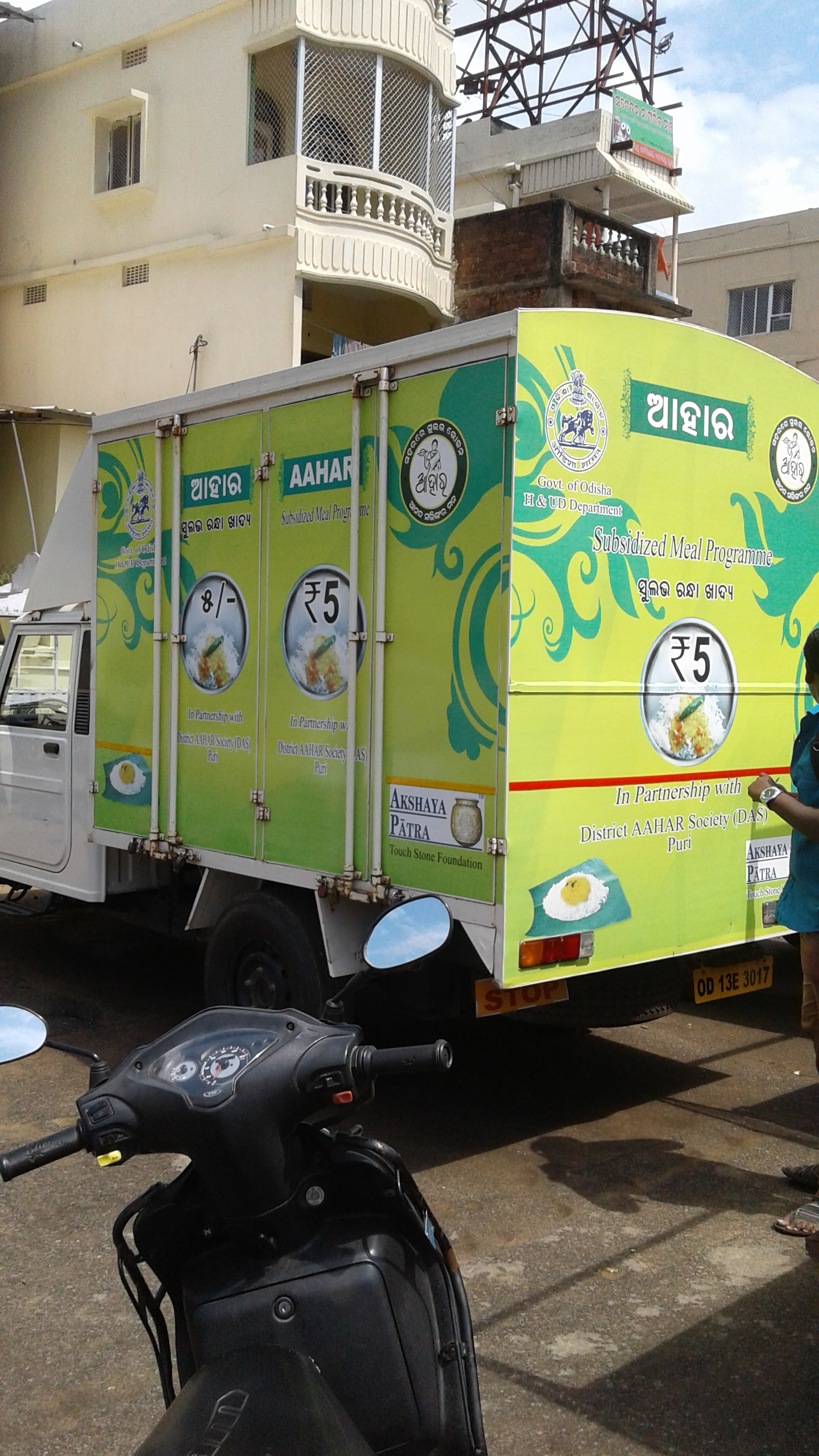
Ahara transporting vehicle

Āhāra Jojanā (meaning "food" in Odia) is a food subsidisation program run by the Ministry of Food Supplies & Consumer Welfare, Co-operation, Government of Odisha to provide cheap lunch to the poor at a price of five rupees inspired from the Amma Unavagam of Tamilnadu. It was inaugurated on April 1, 2015 by the Chief Minister of Odisha Nabin Patnaik on Utkala Dibasa. The program provides meals in various parts of Odisha. The actual cost of the food is around ₹ 20 but is subsidised to ₹ 5 with financial assistance from the Odisha Mining Corporation. It is targeted at more than 60,000 people per day.

== Purpose ==
The program is funded by the Government of Odisha. The objective is to provide cheap cooked meals to impecunious and needy people. The government launched it as a pilot project in 5 municipal corporations and 21 Āhāra centers but later expanded to 100 Āhāra centers are active in 30 districts covering 73 towns. Āhār centers are mainly found in places like hospitals, bus stands or railway stations to serve cooked day meals at just ₹ 5. The hygiene of the food is checked by different municipal hospitals. Recently the government added night meals in 54 Āhār centers near hospitals to provide needy visitors with cheap and hygienic night meals.

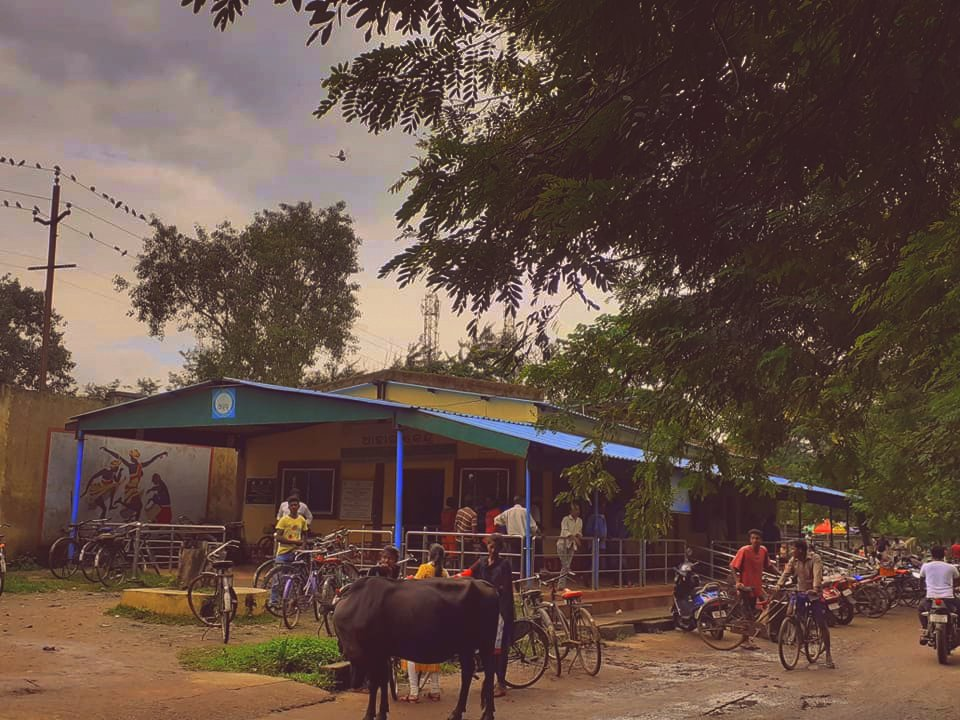
Aahar kendra in Sector-19, Rourkela

== Menu and prices ==
Food provided under this program is bhāta (boiled rice) and dālmā at ₹ 5. The Āhār centres provide food at the designated places at 11 am to 3 pm every day. The night meals are served from 7:00-9:00pm.

== Āhār centres ==
1. Cuttack : Badambadi Bus stand, Sishu Bhawan, SCB Medical
2. Bhubaneswar : Master Canteen, Baramunda, BMC office.
3. Berhampur : New Bus stand, Old Bus stand, MKCG Medical college and Railway station.
4. Sambalpur :
5. Rourkela : RGH, Sector - 2, Sector - 19, Vedvyas and City Bus Stand
6. Barbil : Even the Barbil new bus stand has this facility.
7. Bargarh: In front of Women's college, Near Govt. Bus Stand
8. Talcher
9. Angul
10. Kamakhyanagar
11. Chandikhol : Near Kendrapara Bus Stand.
12. Baleswar: HQ Hospital and Nilagiri Subdivision Hospital.

There are in total 100 Āhār centres covering all the districts of Odisha.

== See also ==
- Amma Unavagam, a similar program in Tamil Nadu
