= Chandra Theertham (Karaikal) =

Religious temple in India

Religion
- Affiliation: Hinduism
- District: Karaikal District
- Festival: Theppotsavam
- Governing body: Hindu Religious Institutions & Wakf (Puducherry), Sri Kailasanadha Swamy Sri Nithyakalyana Perumal Vagaiyara Devasthanam and Sri Karaikal Ammaiyar Aalayam

Location
- State: Puducherry

Chandra Theertham is a temple tank situated in the old town of Karaikal in Southeastern India, used by the adjoining temples of Karaikal Ammayar, Nithyakalyana Perumal and Kailasanathar. The Karaikal float festival (Theppam or Theppotsavam) is celebrated in this temple tank.

== History and beliefs ==
The belief of the Karaikal people is if we bath once in this temple tank, all the bone related diseases and fractures will get cured. The Chandra Theertham is cleaned for long time and the work got completed in the year 2010.

== Karaikal Floating Festival ==
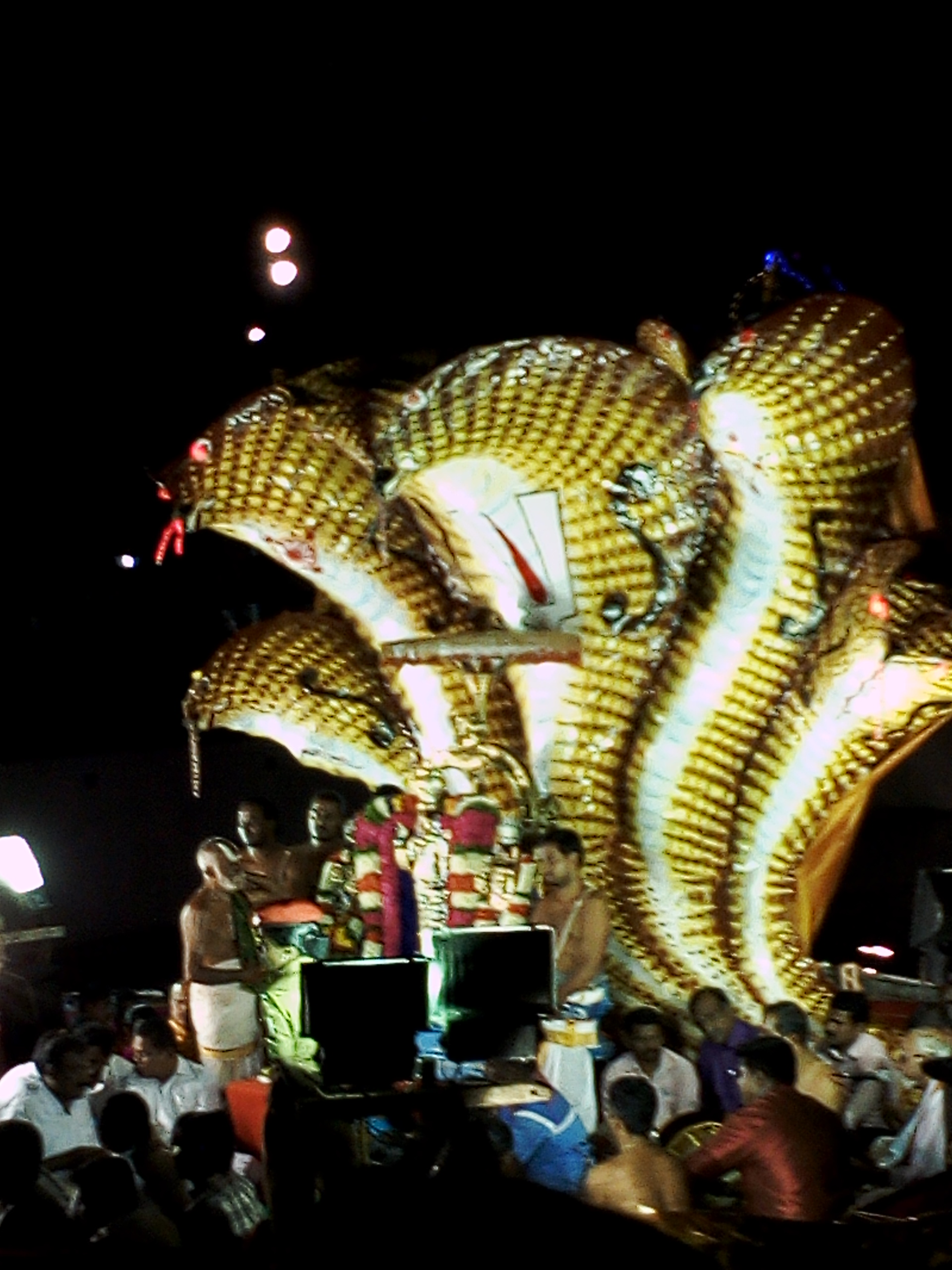
Theppam or Float Festival of the Vaishnavite temple of Sri Nityakalyana Perumal.

In 2010 the Karaikal Floating festival was held after 30 years. This was due to the help of the local MLA and former Health minister Mr. A.M.H.Nazeem. It was celebrated in a grand manner. After that continuously, for every year a Float festival was held. The Theppam will move in this temple tank, rounding three times. People of Karaikal and nearby towns gather in the Chandra Theertham during this festival. This Floating festival is celebrated either for the Nithyakalyana Perumal or Karaikal Kailasanathar.
