= Hansraj Patel =

Indian politician

Member of the Rajasthan Legislative Assembly
- Incumbent
- Assumed office 3 December 2023
- Preceded by: Rajender Singh Yadav
- Constituency: Kotputli

Personal details
- Party: Bharatiya Janata Party
- Profession: Politician

Hansraj Patel is an Indian politician and a member of the Bharatiya Janata Party. He was elected to the Rajasthan Legislative Assembly from the Kotputli Assembly constituency in the 2023 Rajasthan Legislative Assembly elections, defeating the incumbent Rajender Singh Yadav.

== Election results ==
2023 Kotputli Assembly Election Results
| Year | Constituency | Candidate | Party | Votes | Percentage | Result |
|---|---|---|---|---|---|---|
| 2023 | Kotputli | Hansraj Patel | BJP | 67,716 | 38.37% | Elected |
| 2023 | Kotputli | Rajendra Singh Yadav | INC | 67,395 | 38.19% | Runner-up |
| 2023 | Kotputli | Mukesh Goyal | IND | 33,850 | 19.18% | Lost |
