= Baran-Atru Assembly constituency =

Legislative Assembly constituency in Rajasthan State, India

Coordinates: 24.88°N 76.67°E

Baran-Atru
- Constituency No. 195 for the Rajasthan Legislative Assembly

Constituency details
- Country: India
- Region: North India
- State: Rajasthan
- District: Baran
- Lok Sabha constituency: Jhalawar–Baran
- Established: 2008
- Total electors: 240,979
- Reservation: SC

Member of Legislative Assembly
- 16th Rajasthan Legislative Assembly
- Incumbent Radheyshayam Bairwa
- Party: Bhartiya Janta Party

Baran-Atru Assembly constituency is one of the 200 Legislative Assembly constituencies of Rajasthan state in India. It is part of Baran district and is reserved for candidates belonging to the Scheduled Castes.

== Members of the Legislative Assembly ==
Election	Name	Party
1980	Raghuveer Singh Kaushal	Bharatiya Janta Party
1985	Shiv Narayan Nagar	Indian National Congress
1990	Raghuveer Singh Kaushal	Bharatiya Janta Party
1993	Raghuveer Singh Kaushal	Bharatiya Janta Party
1998	Shiv Narayan Nagar	Indian National Congress
2003	Pramod Jain Bhaya	Independent politician
2008	Pana Chand Meghwal	Indian National Congress
2013	Rampal	Bharatiya Janta Party
2018	Pana Chand Meghwal	Indian National Congress
2023	Radheyshayam Bairwa	Bharatiya Janta Party

== Election results ==
=== 2023 ===
2023 Rajasthan Legislative Assembly election: Baran-Atru
Party	Candidate	Votes	%	±%
BJP	Radheyshyam Bairwa	101,538	53.84	+10.44
INC	Pana Chand Meghwal	81,784	43.36	−7.15
NOTA	None of the above	2,091	1.11	−0.67
Majority		19,754	10.48	+3.37
Turnout		188,597	78.26	+1.8
BJP gain from INC		Swing		

=== 2018 ===
2018 Rajasthan Legislative Assembly election: Baran-Atru
Party	Candidate	Votes	%	±%
INC	Pana Chand Meghwal	86,986	50.51	
BJP	Baboo Lal Verma	74,738	43.4	
Independent	Dharmraj Mehra	3,778	2.19	
NOTA	None of the above	3,063	1.78	
Majority		12,248	7.11	
Turnout		172,214	76.46	

== See also ==
- List of constituencies of the Rajasthan Legislative Assembly
- Baran district
