= Geeta Verma =

Indian politician

Member of the Rajasthan Legislative Assembly
- In office 2013–2018
- Succeeded by: Mamta Bhupesh
- Preceded by: Mamta Bhupesh

Personal details
- Born: 9 January 1973 (age 53) Kota, Rajasthan
- Party: National People's Party
- Spouse: Yaswant Singh
- Children: 1
- Occupation: Politician

Geeta Verma is an Indian politician and member of the National People's Party. She represents the Sikrai seat in Rajasthan Legislative Assembly.
