= Anta Assembly constituency =

Legislative Assembly constituency in Rajasthan State, India

Coordinates: 25.16°N 76.31°E

Anta
- Constituency No. 193 for the Rajasthan Legislative Assembly

Constituency details
- Country: India
- Region: North India
- State: Rajasthan
- District: Baran
- Lok Sabha constituency: Jhalawar-Baran
- Established: 2008
- Total electors: 217,028
- Reservation: None

Member of Legislative Assembly
- 16th Rajasthan Legislative Assembly
- Incumbent Pramod Jain Bhaya
- Party: INC
- Elected year: 2025

Anta Assembly constituency is one of the 200 Legislative Assembly constituencies of Rajasthan state in India.

It is part of Baran district.

== Members of the Legislative Assembly ==
Year	Member	Party
2008	Pramod Jain Bhaya	Indian National Congress
2013	Prabhu Lal Saini	Bharatiya Janata Party
2018	Pramod Jain Bhaya	Indian National Congress
2023	Kanwar Lal Meena	Bharatiya Janata Party
2025^	Pramod Jain Bhaya	Indian National Congress

^By-election

== Election results ==
=== 2025 by-election ===
Rajasthan Legislative Assembly by-election, 2025: Anta
Party	Candidate	Votes	%	±%
INC	Pramod Jain Bhaya	69,571	37.94	−8.37
BJP	Morpal Suman	53,959	29.42	−20.22
Independent	Naresh Meena	53,800	29.33	New entry
NOTA	None of the Above	925	0.50	
Majority		15,612	8.51	
INC gain from BJP		Swing	+5.93	

=== 2023 ===
Rajasthan Legislative Assembly Election, 2023: Anta
Party	Candidate	Votes	%	±%
BJP	Kanwar Lal Meena	87,390	49.64	+11.91
INC	Pramod Jain Bhaya	81,529	46.31	−11.78
NOTA	None of the above	1,271	0.72	−0.06
Majority		5,861	3.33	−17.03
Turnout		176,064	81.13	+0.67
BJP gain from INC		Swing		

=== 2018 ===
Rajasthan Legislative Assembly Election, 2018: Anta
Party	Candidate	Votes	%	±%
INC	Pramod Jain Bhaya	97,160	58.09	
BJP	Prabhu Lal Saini	63,097	37.73	
AAP	Ashok Kumar Jain	1,739	1.04	
NOTA	None of the above	1,301	0.78	
Majority		34,063	20.36	
Turnout		167,249	80.46	
INC gain from BJP		Swing		

=== 2013 ===
Rajasthan Legislative Assembly Election, 2013: Anta
Party	Candidate	Votes	%	±%
BJP	Prabhu Lal Saini	69,960	48.84	
INC	Pramod Jain Bhaya	66,561	46.47	

=== 2008 ===
Rajasthan Legislative Assembly Election, 2008: Anta
Party	Candidate	Votes	%	±%
INC	Pramod Jain Bhaya	56,345	50.29	
BJP	Raghuveer Singh Kaushal	26,851	23.89	
Independent	Mohan Lal	20,000	17.95	
Majority		29,968		
Turnout		112,381		71.00

== See also ==
- List of constituencies of the Rajasthan Legislative Assembly
- Baran district
