= Sikrai Assembly constituency =

Legislative Assembly constituency in Rajasthan State, India

Coordinates: 26.92°N 76.69°E

Sikrai
- Constituency No. 87 for the Rajasthan Legislative Assembly

Constituency details
- Country: India
- Region: North India
- State: Rajasthan
- District: Dausa
- Lok Sabha constituency: Dausa
- Established: 1972
- Total electors: 263,403
- Reservation: SC

Member of Legislative Assembly
- 16th Rajasthan Legislative Assembly
- Incumbent Vikram Bansiwal
- Party: Bhartiya Janata Party
- Elected year: 2023
- Preceded by: Mamta Bhupesh

Sikrai Assembly constituency is one of the 200 Legislative Assembly constituencies of Rajasthan state in India.

It is part of Dausa district, and is reserved for candidates belonging to the Scheduled Castes. As of 2018, it is represented by Vikram Bansiwal of the Bhartiya Janata Party.

== Members of the Legislative Assembly ==
Year	Member	Picture	Party
2008	Mamta Bhupesh		Indian National Congress
2013	Geeta Verma		National People's Party
2018	Mamta Bhupesh		Indian National Congress
2023	Vikram Bansiwal		Bharatiya Janata Party

== Election results ==
=== 2023 ===
2023 Rajasthan Legislative Assembly election: Sikrai
Party	Candidate	Votes	%	±%
BJP	Vikram Bansiwal	91,996	50.08	▲13.02
INC	Mamta Bhupesh	82,568	44.95	▼12.09
ASP(KR)	Manisha Devi	2,869	1.56	
Independent	Leela Ram	1,810	0.99	
NOTA	None of the above	1,210	0.66	▼0.57
Majority		9,428	5.13	▼14.85
Turnout		183,708	69.74	▼1.3
BJP gain from INC		Swing		

=== 2018 ===
2018 Rajasthan Legislative Assembly election: Sikrai
Party	Candidate	Votes	%	±%
INC	Mamta Bhupesh	96,454	57.04	
BJP	Vikram Bansiwal	62,671	37.06	
BSP	Phaili Ram	5,670	3.35	
Bharat Vahini Party	Geeta Verma	2,236	1.32	
NOTA	None of the above	2,075	1.23	
Majority		33,783	19.98	
Turnout		169,106	71.04	
INC gain from NPP		Swing		

== See also ==
- List of constituencies of the Rajasthan Legislative Assembly
- Dausa district
