= Anna Canteen =

Subsidised meal initiative by the government of Andhra Pradesh, India

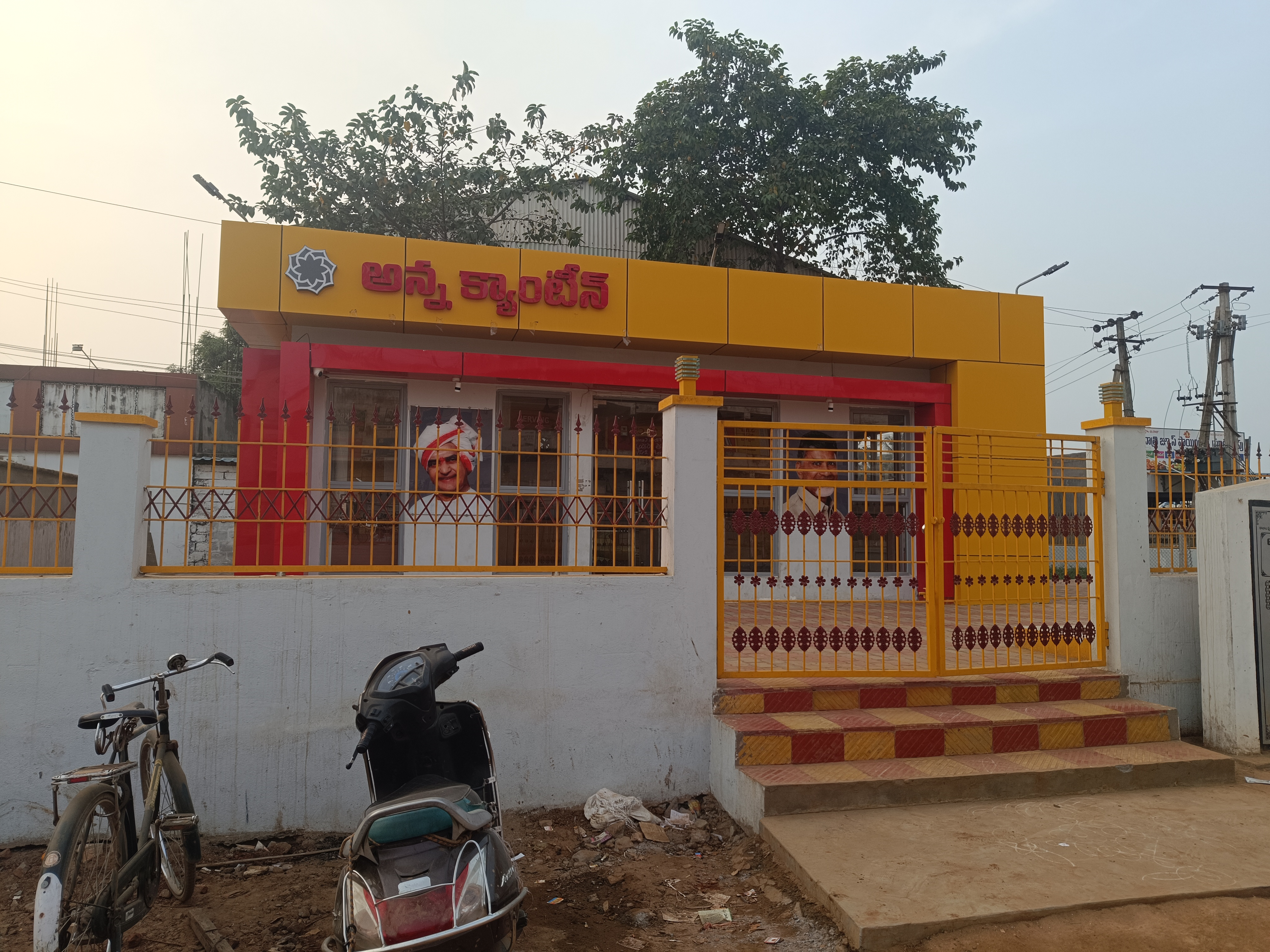
- Anna Canteen at Rajam
- Type: Government-owned Restaurant
- Industry: Restaurant service
- Genre: South Indian vegetarian cuisine
- Founded: 11 September 2018 (7 years ago) (initially); 15 August 2024 (22 months ago) (re-opened)
- Founder: N. Chandrababu Naidu
- Number of locations: 205 canteens
- Area served: Andhra Pradesh
- Key people: Ponguru Narayana (Minister of Municipal Administration and Urban Development, Government of Andhra Pradesh)
- Products: Breakfast; Lunch; Dinner
- Services: Subsidised low cost food
- Revenue: Non-profit organisation
- Owner: Government of Andhra Pradesh
- Parent: Ministry of Municipal Administration and Urban Development, Government of Andhra Pradesh
- Website: Anna Canteen official website

Anna Canteen is a subsidised food service initiative launched by the Government of Andhra Pradesh on 11 September 2018, under Chief Minister N. Chandrababu Naidu. The program was named in honor of N. T. Rama Rao, popularly known as "Anna," who introduced subsidised rice at ₹2 per kilogram in 1983. Anna Canteen was designed to offer meals at a subsidised rate of ₹5 which would be ₹15 per day including breakfast, lunch and dinner. The Akshaya Patra Foundation initially managed the canteens.

The initiative was discontinued by the YSR Congress Party government in 2019 was re-opened on 15 August 2024 with 100 canteens in phase 1, following the National Democratic Alliance's success in the 2024 polls. The revival aims to continue providing affordable and nutritious meals to all individuals.

As of 2025, there are a total of 205 canteens in the state.

== Menu and timings ==
The canteens operate from 7:00 AM to 10:00 AM for breakfast offering South Indian dishes such as Idli, Upma, Puri, and Pongal. Lunch is served from 12:30 PM to 3:00 PM, and dinner is available from 7:30 PM to 9:00 PM. The meals include white rice, vegetable curry, Dal/Sambar, Chutney, and curd.

== See also ==
- Amma Unavagam, a similar scheme in the state of Tamil Nadu
