= Amma Kudineer =

Amma Kudineer is a mineral water production and distribution project run by the Ministry of Water Resources, Government of Tamil Nadu in India.

== About the scheme ==
The project was formally launched on 15 September 2013 by the then chief minister of Tamil Nadu J. Jayalalithaa.

The project involved production and packaging of mineral water in one litre plastic bottles, and selling them in long-distance running state-owned buses and in bus stations. The price was fixed at ₹10 per bottle.

The scheme is run by the Tamil Nadu State Transport Corporation, with a production plant in Gummidipoondi in Thiruvallur district. The plant has the capacity to produce 3 lakh liters of purified water per day. The total dissolved solids (TDS) in the water was reported to be below 50 parts per million (ppm).

Its sales was extended to all over tamil nadu. However, within several days, the demand for water bottles increased which lead to supply shortage at many places.

Presently, the sales of Amma Water bottles have stopped due to a technical problem at the Gummidipoondi Factory. There are no plans by the government to repair this plant due to change in ruling power.

== See also ==
- Amma Unavagam
