= Govind Prasad =

Indian politician

Member of 15th Rajasthan Assembly
- In office 2013–2018
- Preceded by: Kanwar Lal Meena
- Constituency: Manohar Thana

Member of 16th Rajasthan Assembly
- Incumbent
- Assumed office 2023
- Preceded by: Kailash Chand
- Constituency: Manohar Thana

Personal details
- Born: 5 July 1960 (age 66)
- Party: Bhartiya Janta Party
- Parent: Badrilal (father)
- Occupation: Politician
- Profession: Agriculture

Govind Prasad (born 5 July 1960) is an Indian politician currently serving as a member of the 16th Rajasthan Legislative Assembly. He is a member of the Bhartiya Janta Party and represents the Manohar Thana Assembly constituency in Jhalawar district.

From 2013 to 2018, he served as a member of the 15th Rajasthan Legislative Assembly and represented Manohar Thana Assembly constituency.

== Career ==
Following the 2023 Rajasthan Legislative Assembly election, he was elected as an MLA from the Manohar Thana Assembly constituency, defeating Kailash Chand, the candidate from the Indian National Congress (INC), by a margin of 21,869 votes.
