= Lalit Meena =

Indian politician

Member of the 16th Rajasthan Legislative Assembly
- Incumbent
- Assumed office 3 December 2023
- Preceded by: Nirmala Sahariya
- Constituency: Kishanganj

Member of the 14th Rajasthan Legislative Assembly
- In office December 2013 - December 2018
- Preceded by: Nirmala Sahariya
- Succeeded by: Nirmala Sahariya
- Constituency: Kishanganj

Personal details
- Born: Baran, Rajasthan
- Party: Bharatiya Janata Party

Lalit Meena is an Indian politician currently serving as a member of the 16th Rajasthan Legislative Assembly, representing the Kishanganj constituency in Baran district. He previously served as an MLA from 2013 to 2018, representing the same constituency.

== Political career ==
Following the 2023 Rajasthan Legislative Assembly election, he was elected as an MLA from the Kishanganj Assembly constituency, defeating Nirmala Sahariya, the candidate from the Indian National Congress (INC), by a margin of 22,281 votes.
