= Kaluram Meghwal =

Indian politician

- कालूराम मेघवाल

Member of the Rajasthan Legislative Assembly
- Incumbent
- Assumed office 2018
- Preceded by: Ramchandra
- Constituency: Dag

Sarpanch Gram Panchayat Pipliya Khurd
- In office 2005–2010

Sub Sarpanch Gram Panchayat Pipliya Khurd
- In office 1995–2000

Personal details
- Born: 1 February 1970 (age 56) Umariya, Jhalawar, Rajasthan, India
- Party: Bharatiya Janata Party
- Spouse: Munna Bai
- Children: 4
- Parent(s): Mangi Lal Meghwal (Father); Narayan Bai (Mother)
- Occupation: MLA
- Profession: Agriculture
- Website: official website

Kaluram Meghwal (1 February 1970) is an Indian politician currently serving as a 15th & 16th Member of the Rajasthan Legislative Assembly from Dag. He is Member of the Bhartiya Janta Party.

From 2018 to 2023, he was elected as MLA from Dag Assembly constituency for the first time.

Following the 2023 Rajasthan Legislative Assembly election, he was re-elected as an MLA from the Dag Assembly constituency, defeating Chetraj, the candidate from the Indian National Congress (INC), by a margin of 22,294 votes.
