= Prabhu Lal Saini =

Indian politician

Cabinet Minister of Government of Rajasthan
- In office 2013 - 2018

Member of the Rajasthan Legislative Assembly
- In office 2013 - 2018
- Constituency: Anta
- In office 2008 - 2013
- Constituency: Hindoli
- In office 2003 - 2008
- Constituency: Uniara

Personal details
- Party: Bharatiya Janata Party

Prabhu Lal Saini is a Rajasthani politician. He is a former cabinet minister in the government of Rajasthan led by Vasundhara Raje. He is a senior leader of Bharatiya Janata Party. He serves in the Rajasthan Legislative Assembly from Tonk district. He is minister of agriculture and animal husbandry.

== Early life ==
He was Agriculture Minister of Rajasthan from 2003 to 2008. In the 2008 election, he was elected to the Hindoli (Bundi) assembly seat. In 2013, Prabhu Lal Saini of BJP won 'the Anta' Assembly seat. Prabhu Lal Saini secured 48.84% of the total votes polled. Then he became the Agriculture Minister of Rajasthan from 2013 to 2018.
