= Radheshyam Bairwa =

Indian politician

Member of the Rajasthan Legislative Assembly
- Incumbent
- Assumed office 4 December 2023
- Preceded by: Panachand Meghwal
- Constituency: Baran-Atru

Personal details
- Party: Bharatiya Janata Party
- Spouse: Santosh Bai
- Children: 2
- Occupation: Politician

Radheshyam Bairwa is an Indian politician. He was elected to the 16th Rajasthan Legislative Assembly from the Baran-Atru Assembly constituency as a member of the Bhartiya Janta Party.

== Political career ==
Following the 2023 Rajasthan Legislative Assembly election, he was elected as an MLA from the Baran-Atru Assembly constituency, defeating Panachand Meghwal, the candidate from the Indian National Congress (INC), by a margin of 19,754 votes.
