= Panachand Meghwal =

Indian politician

Pana Chand Meghwal

Member Of Legislative Assembly, Rajasthan
- In office 11 December 2018 – 15 August 2022
- Preceded by: Rampal
- Succeeded by: Radheyshayam Bairwa
- Constituency: Baran-Atru

Personal details
- Born: Kanwarpura, Rajasthan, India
- Party: Indian National Congress

Pana Chand Meghwal is an Indian politician from the Indian National Congress and former member of the Rajasthan Legislative Assembly. He is elected to represent the Baran-Atru Constituency. He wrote an application for resignation from the Rajasthan Assembly on 15 August 2022. Miffed over cases of alleged atrocities on Dalits, Congress MLA Pana Chand Meghwal sent his resignation to Chief Minister Ashok Gehlot, stating that he does not have the right to remain as an MLA if he cannot protect the rights of his community. However, his resignation was not accepted, and he continues to serve as an MLA.
