= Odisha Mining Corporation =

Odisha's Public Sector Undertaking

- Company type: Public Sector Undertaking; Government of Odisha
- Industry: Mining
- Founded: 1956
- Headquarters: Bhubaneswar, Odisha, India
- Area served: Odisha
- Key people: L. Vineel Krishna; IAS MD

Odisha Mining Corporation Limited or OMC is a Gold Category Public Sector Undertaking (PSU) established on 16 May 1956. The joint venture company between Government of Odisha and Government of India to explore and harness mineral wealth of Odisha is now a wholly state owned corporation.

Odisha Mining Corporation is managed by a board of directors consisting of Government Directors and Independent Directors. The day-to-day management of the corporation is looked after by the chairman and the managing director as authorized by the board of directors.

== History ==
Odisha Mining Corporation Limited (OMC) was formed on 16 May 1956 as a joint venture company of Government of Odisha and Government of India to explore and harness mineral wealth of the State of Odisha.

On 17 November 1961, OMC became a wholly State-owned Corporation of Government of Odisha. It received ISO 9001:2000 Certification in 2003.Enterprise Resource Planning (ERP) Package as a Management Tool implemented for which Odisha Mining Corporation received Golden Peacock Award in 2006–07. It received ISO 14001:2004 Certification in 2007.

In 2012 the Odisha Mining Corporation Limited was classified as a "Gold Category" State Public Sector Undertaking (PSU).

In July 2025, it targeted a production of 50 million tons. Earlier in July 2024, it recorded Rs.4.7 cr profit. As of December 2025, its production reached 24.8 million tonnes.
