= Nithyakalyana Perumal Temple, Karaikal =

Coordinates: 10.9231°N 79.8324°E

Nithyakalyana Perumal Temple is one of three famous temples in the port city of Karaikal, Puducherry, India. It is nearby the Karaikal Ammayar Temple. The temple tank of Chandra Theertham separates the two temples. The temple tank belongs to both the temples. The Nithyakalyana Perumal temple is located on the Bharathiar Street of Karaikal.

== Deities inside the temple ==
The temple is a Vishnu temple with the idol of Vishnu in a lying posture named Nithyakalyana Perumal. He is the main god of the temple. The Nithyakalyana Perumal sanctum is present in the temple. In the praghara, there are many sanctums for the gods:

- Chakkarathazhwar
- Ranganayaghi Thayar
- Narasimha avatar of Lord Vishnu
- Hanuman
- Avatars of Lord Vishnu
- Lord Krishna's Vishwaroopam
- Lord Garuda
- Aandal
- Alamelu Thayaar

== Functions celebrated ==
The festivals related to Vishnu and his avatars are celebrated in a grand manner in this temple. The Rama Navami, Vaikunda Ekadesi, Hanuman Jayanti and the entire month of Margazhi are celebrated here. During the Tamil month of Poorattadhi or Puratasi, many rituals take place in the temple such as the Pavithra pradhistai, Kumba poojai, Poornahoothi, and Chakarathazwar Aavahanam.
