= Kotputli Assembly constituency =

Constituency of the Rajasthan legislative assembly in India

Coordinates: 27.71°N 76.19°E

Kotputli
- Constituency No. 40 for the Rajasthan Legislative Assembly

Constituency details
- Country: India
- Region: North India
- State: Rajasthan
- District: Kotputl-Behror
- Established: 1951
- Reservation: None

Member of Legislative Assembly
- 16th Rajasthan Legislative Assembly
- Incumbent Hansraj Patel
- Party: BJP

Kotputli Assembly constituency is one of constituencies of Rajasthan Legislative Assembly in the Jaipur Rural Lok Sabha constituency.

Kotputli constituency is considered as gurjar dominant. And the number of gurjar voters in this seat is around 60 thousand. present MLA by BJP Shri Hansraj Patel Gurjar.

Kotputli constituency covers all voters from parts of Kotputli tehsil, which include ILRC Kotputli including Kotputli Municipal Board, ILRC Narheda, Paniyal community niyala and ILRC Dantil.

== Members of the Legislative Assembly ==
Year	Name	Party
1951	Hazari Lal	Indian National Congress
1957	Ram Karan Singh	Bharatiya Jana Sangh
1962	Mukti Lal	Indian National Congress
1967	Shri Ram	Swatantra Party
1972	Suresh Chandra	Swatantra Party
1977	Ram Karan Singh	Independent
1980	Shri Ram	Indian National Congress
1985	Mukti Lal	Independent
1990	Ram Karan Singh	Independent
1993	Ram Chander Rawat	Indian National Congress
1998	Raghuvir Singh	Bharatiya Janata Party
2003	Subhash Chandra	Independent
2008	Ramswaroop Kasana	Independent
2013	Rajender Singh Yadav	Indian National Congress
2018	Rajender Singh Yadav	Indian National Congress
2023	Hansraj Patel	Bhartiya Janata Party

== Election results ==
=== 2023 ===
2023 Rajasthan Legislative Assembly election: Kotputli
Party	Candidate	Votes	%	±%
BJP	Hansraj Patel	67,716	38.37	+11.29
INC	Rajendra Singh Yadav	67,395	38.19	+2.42
Independent	Mukesh Goyal	33,850	19.18	
RLP	Satish Kumar Mandaiya	2,187	1.24	−16.52
JJP	Ramniwas Yadav	1,682	0.95	
NOTA	None of the above	930	0.53	−0.51
Majority		321	0.18	−8.51
Turnout		176,466	77.08	+0.31
BJP gain from INC		Swing		

=== 2018 ===
2018 Rajasthan Legislative Assembly election: Kotputli
Party	Candidate	Votes	%	±%
INC	Rajender Singh Yadav	57,114	35.77	
BJP	Mukesh Goyal	43,238	27.08	
RLP	Ramswaroop	28,353	17.76	
Independent	Hansraj	24,960	15.63	
NOTA	None of the above	1,666	1.04	
Majority		13,876	8.69	
Turnout		159,688	76.77	
INC gain from		Swing		

== See also ==
- Member of the Legislative Assembly (India)
