= Curd rice =

Indian dish

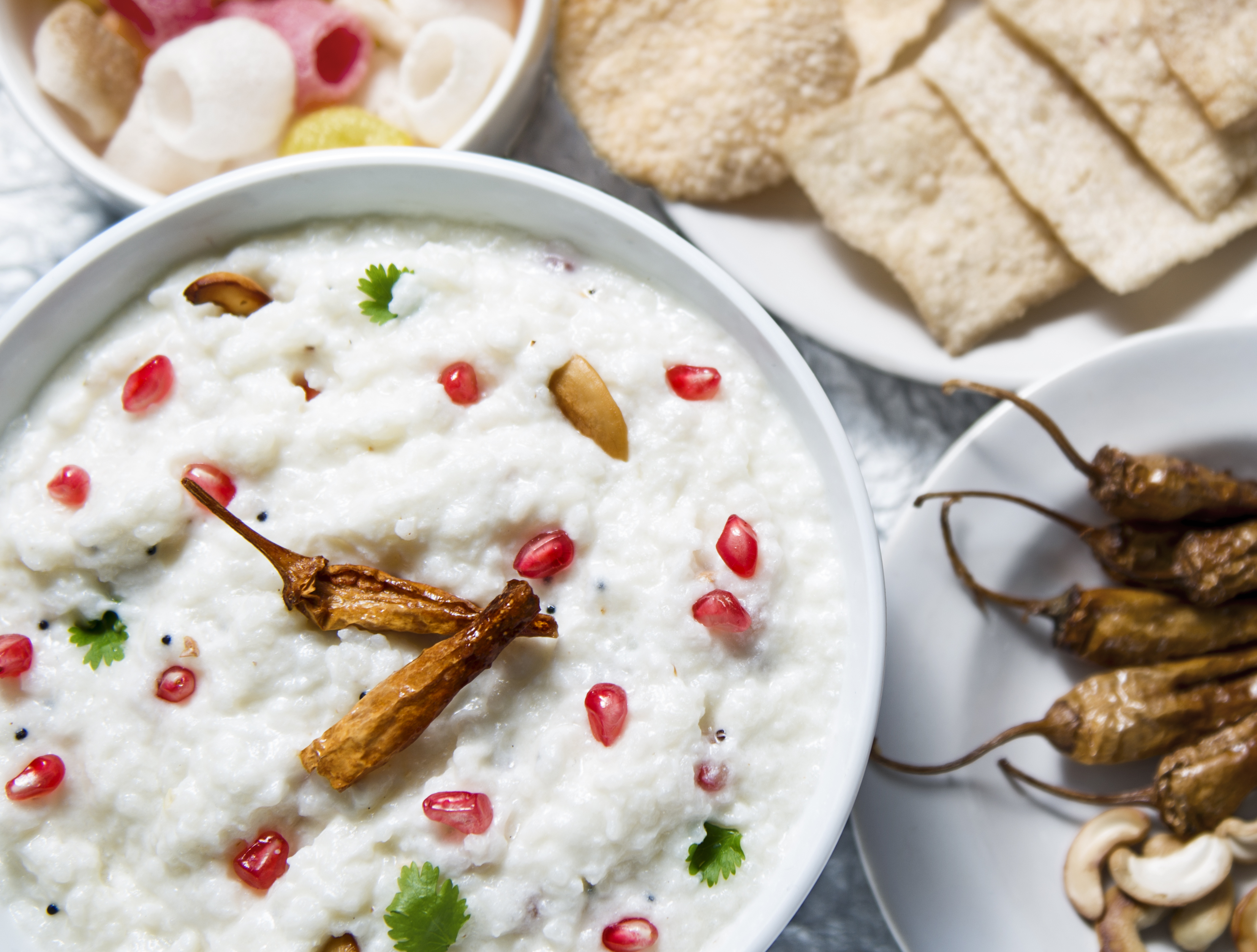
- Alternative names: Yogurt rice
- Place of origin: India
- Region or state: South Indian cuisine
- Main ingredients: Rice, yogurt, tempering

Curd rice or yogurt rice is a dish originating from India. The word "curd" in Indian English refers to unsweetened plain yogurt. It is most popular in the South Indian states of Tamil Nadu, Kerala, Karnataka, Telangana and Andhra Pradesh; and also in West Indian states of Rajasthan, Gujarat and Maharashtra.

== Name ==
Depending on region, this dish is referred to by several different local names: auliyā (ओलिया) in Rajasthan, ghens (ઘેંસ) in Gujarat, dahi bhāt (दही भात) in Maharashtra, tayir sādam/sōru (தயிர் சாதம்/சோறு), bagalabath (பகாலாபாத்) in Tamil Nadu, tayire chōr (തയിരെ ചോർ) in Kerala, perugannam/daddojanam (పెరుగన్నం/దద్దోజనం) in Telangana and Andhra Pradesh, mosaranna (ಮೊಸರನ್ನ) in Karnataka, and dahi chunka bhāta/phenchā (ଦହି ଛୁଙ୍କ ଭାତ/ଫେଞ୍ଚା) in Odisha.

== Preparation ==
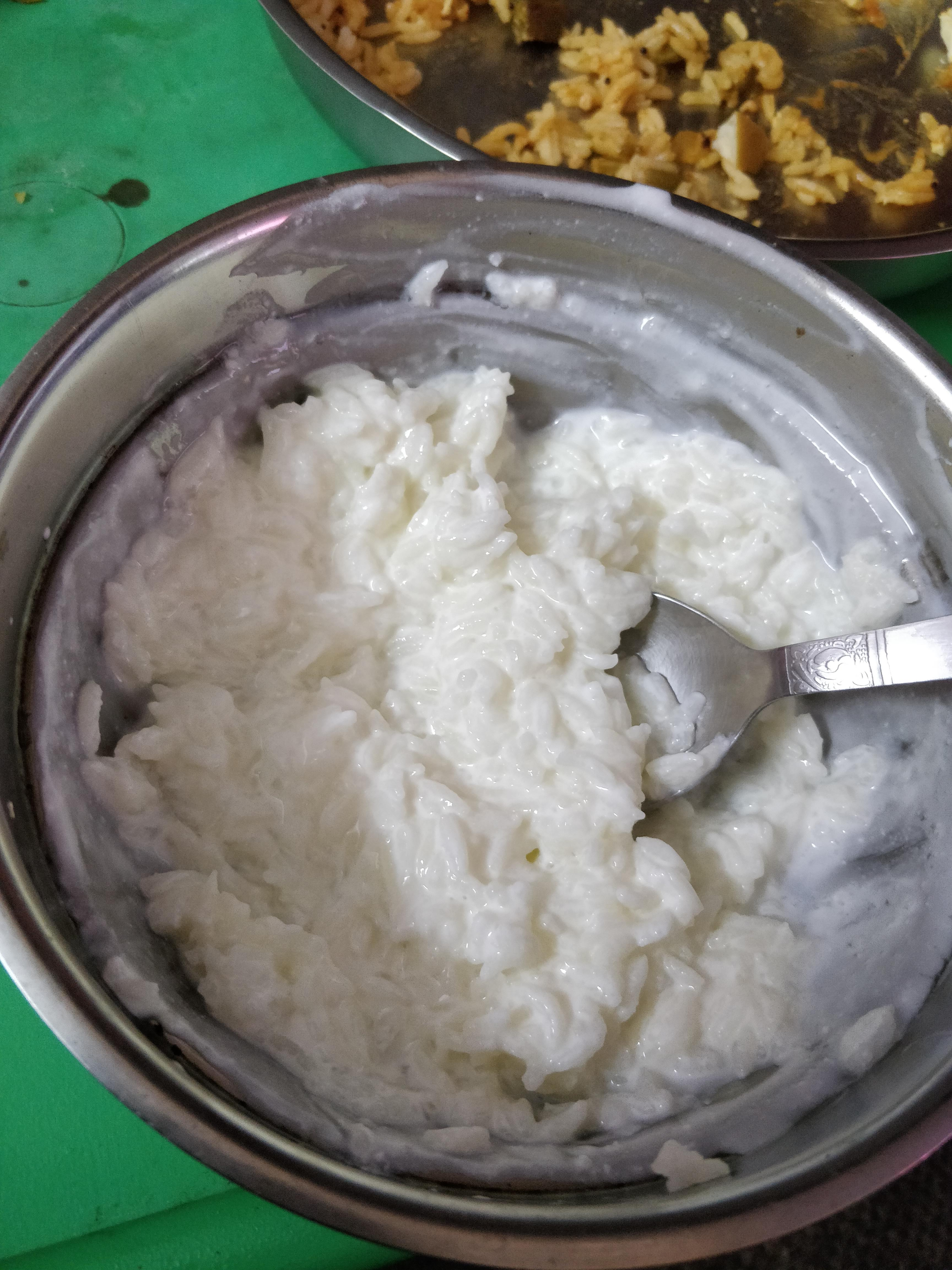
The authentic South Indian dish

While combining steamed white rice and yogurt is the simplest way to make it, more complex techniques can be utilized when necessary. Rice is prepared either via steaming or pressure cooking to be soft as in the South Indian style. It is then allowed to cool to room temperature, after which it is seasoned with finely chopped green chillies, ginger, and curry leaves, and sometimes along with the tempering of black gram, mustard seeds, cumin seeds, and asafoetida. Finally, curd and salt are added.

Alternatively, it can be prepared by mashing cooked plain rice (mostly leftovers) with some salt, curd and (a little milk to lessen the sourness) garnishing it with fried urad dal, mustard seeds, green chilli and chopped coriander. Also, adding a few chopped onions in bigger slices will help the curd rice from fermenting too quickly.

In some areas, curd rice is served in a unique style where steamed rice is mixed with mild curd, salted and then tempered with mustard seeds, curry leaves, dry chillies and black gram. Garnishing varies with region, and ranges from grated carrots, pomegranate seeds, raisins, green and purple grapes, fried cashews to grated raw mango and boondi. It can be served tepid or chilled. Additional options include a pinch of powdered and roasted asafoetida.

Variations of the recipe are countless and are present in all states, reflecting the cuisine of each region. For example, in Karnataka, yogurt chillies (sandige menasu) are commonly added as part of the tempering. Regardless of this, the base components of rice, yogurt, tempered ingredients, and fresh ingredients are consistent, with the different ingredients included in each step varying.

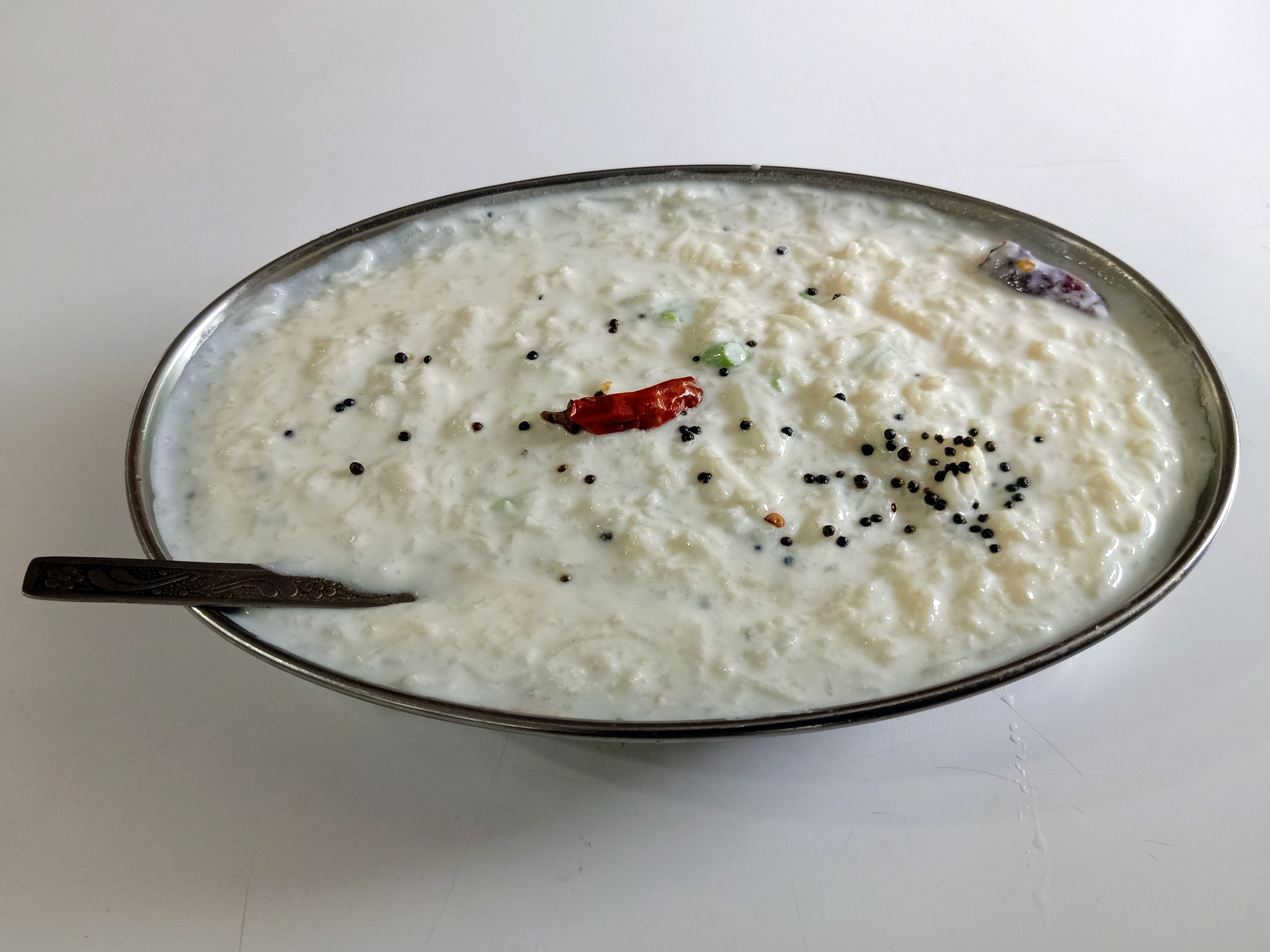
Curd rice in ICH Bhopal

== Serving ==
Curd rice is often eaten accompanied by South Asian pickles. In South Indian cuisine, curd rice is traditionally eaten at the end of lunch and dinner as this helps ease the effects of spicy food consumed prior. It is also said to aid digestion, as well as to balance the effects of the warm climate.

== Occasions ==
The dish is both an everyday food and a food served on special occasions. It is a staple of traditional cuisine, with the untempered version present at the end of almost every Indian meal during summers. In Rajasthan and Gujarat, curd rice varieties auliya and ghens are prepared for the Shitala Saptami and Randhan Chhath festivals. The tempered version is often served during formal occasions and also offered as prasadam ('blessed food') to devotees in Hindu temples.

== See also ==
- Cuisine of India
- List of rice dishes
- Rice congee
- South Indian cuisine
- Udupi cuisine
