= List of constituencies of the Rajasthan Legislative Assembly =

Rajasthan Legislative Assembly
- 16th Rajasthan Assembly

Type
- Type: Unicameral
- Term limits: 5 years
- Seats: 200

Elections
- Voting system: First past the post
- Last election: 2023
- Next election: 2028

Meeting place
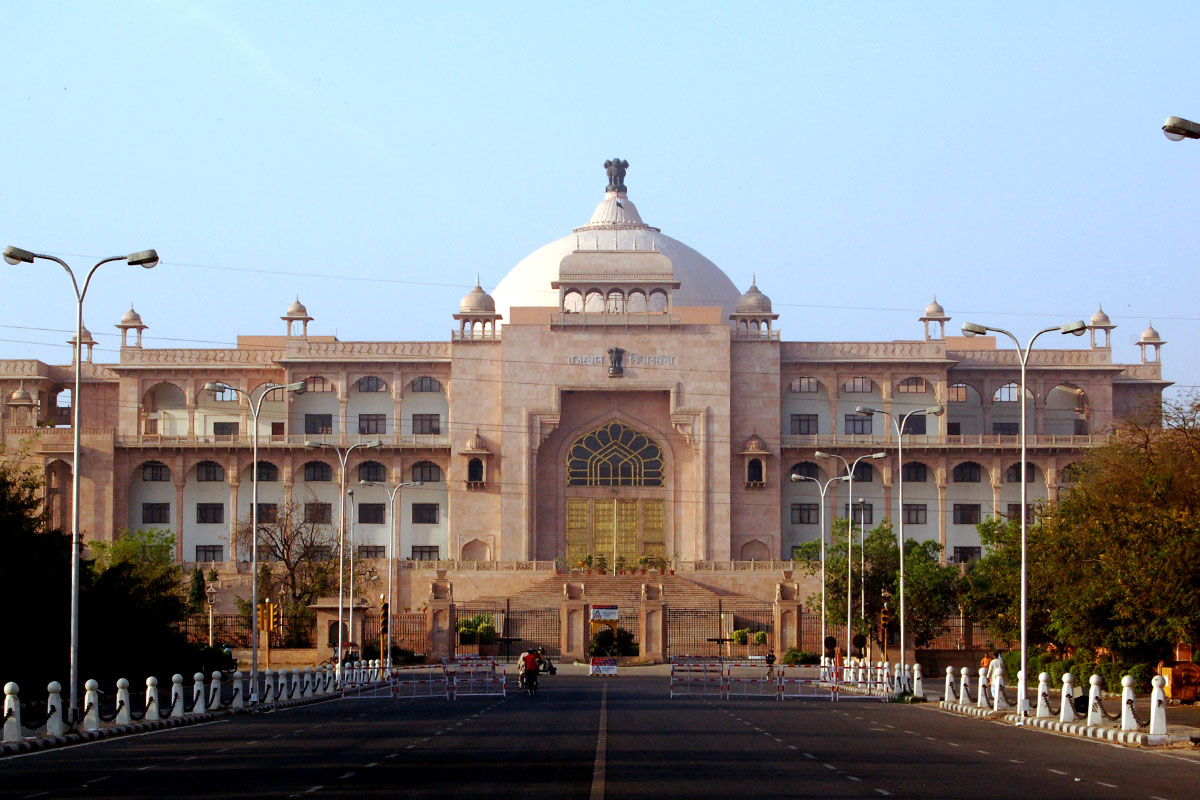
- Vidhan Bhavan at Jaipur, Rajasthan, India

Website
- assembly.rajasthan.gov.in

Location of Rajasthan (highlighted in red) within India

The Rajasthan Legislative Assembly is the unicameral legislature of Rajasthan state in India. The seat of the Legislative Assembly is at Jaipur, the capital of the state. The term of the Legislative Assembly is five years, unless dissolved early. (Note: A Legislative Assembly can be dissolved early, under Article 174 of the Indian Constitution, in a few situations including a hung assembly and the inability of any alliance to form a majority.) Rajasthan is India's eighth largest state by population and the largest by area.

Constituency boundaries are periodically redrawn by the delimitation commission, which tries to keep them as geographically compact areas, and with due consideration to existing boundaries of administrative units. The latest census is used to draw the boundaries and every assembly constituency has to be completely within a parliamentary constituency. Since 1977, the Rajasthan Assembly has had 200 members, who are directly elected from single-seat constituencies.

Since the independence of India from the United Kingdom in 1947, the Scheduled Castes (SC) and Scheduled Tribes (ST) have been given reservation status, guaranteeing political representation, and the Constitution lays down the general principles of positive discrimination for SCs and STs. According to the 2011 census of India the Scheduled Castes constitute 17.8%, while the Scheduled Tribes constitute 13.5% of the population of the state. The Scheduled Castes have been granted a reservation of 34 seats in the assembly, while 25 constituencies are reserved for candidates of the Scheduled Tribes.

== History ==
Changes in the constituencies of the Rajasthan Legislative Assembly over time
Year	Act/Order	Explanation	Total seats	SC-reserved seats	ST-reserved seats	Election(s)
1950, 1951	Delimitation of Parliamentary and Assembly Constituencies Order, 1951	The Indian Constitution came into effect and new constituencies were created.	140	0	1	1952
1956	States Reorganisation Act, 1956	Ajmer State was merged with Rajasthan.	136	28	16	1957
1961	Delimitation of Parliamentary and Assembly Constituencies Order, 1961	There were changes in the number and reservation status of constituencies. Two-member constituencies were abolished.	176	27	19	1962
1966	Delimitation of Parliamentary and Assembly Constituencies Order, 1966	There was an increase in the number of Lok Sabha seats assigned to Rajasthan leading to a corresponding increase in the number of Assembly seats.	184	30	21	1967, 1972
1976	Delimitation of Parliamentary and Assembly Constituencies Order, 1976	There were changes in the number and reservation status of constituencies.	200	33	24	1977, 1980, 1985, 1990, 1993, 1998, 2003
2008	Delimitation Commission Order, 2007	There were changes in the reservation status and area covered by constituencies.	200	34	25	2008, 2013, 2018, 2023

== Constituencies ==
The constituencies of Rajasthan with their reservation status indicated by colour.

The constituencies of the Rajasthan Legislative Assembly were last delimited in 2008.

Reservation
Scheduled Castes (SC)
Scheduled Tribes (ST)

Constituencies of the Rajasthan Legislative Assembly
No.	Name	Reserved for (SC/ST/None)	District	Lok Sabha constituency	Electorate (2023)
1	Sadulshahar	None	Ganganagar	Ganganagar	239,711
2	Ganganagar	None	Ganganagar	Ganganagar	239,157
3	Karanpur	None	Ganganagar	Ganganagar	229,378
4	Suratgarh	None	Ganganagar	Ganganagar	256,202
5	Raisinghnagar	SC	Anupgarh	Ganganagar	268,697
6	Anupgarh	SC	Anupgarh	Bikaner	245,958
7	Sangaria	None	Hanumangarh	Ganganagar	246,117
8	Hanumangarh	None	Hanumangarh	Ganganagar	297,777
9	Pilibanga	SC	Hanumangarh	Ganganagar	297,001
10	Nohar	None	Hanumangarh	Churu	281,235
11	Bhadra	None	Hanumangarh	Churu	276,365
12	Khajuwala	SC	Anupgarh	Bikaner	236,842
13	Bikaner West	None	Bikaner	Bikaner	237,689
14	Bikaner East	None	Bikaner	Bikaner	247,695
15	Kolayat	None	Bikaner	Bikaner	256,184
16	Lunkaransar	None	Bikaner	Bikaner	260,890
17	Dungargarh	None	Bikaner	Bikaner	266,284
18	Nokha	None	Bikaner	Bikaner	282,544
19	Sadulpur	None	Churu	Churu	251,075
20	Taranagar	None	Churu	Churu	263,222
21	Sardarshahar	None	Churu	Churu	305,828
22	Churu	None	Churu	Churu	256,667
23	Ratangarh	None	Churu	Churu	278,507
24	Sujangarh	SC	Churu	Churu	289,506
25	Pilani	SC	Jhunjhunu	Jhunjhunu	249,563
26	Surajgarh	None	Jhunjhunu	Jhunjhunu	291,469
27	Jhunjhunu	None	Jhunjhunu	Jhunjhunu	272,359
28	Mandawa	None	Jhunjhunu	Jhunjhunu	248,549
29	Nawalgarh	None	Jhunjhunu	Jhunjhunu	280,618
30	Udaipurwati	None	Jhunjhunu	Jhunjhunu	259,964
31	Khetri	None	Jhunjhunu	Jhunjhunu	227,852
32	Fatehpur	None	Sikar	Jhunjhunu	254,795
33	Lachhmangarh	None	Sikar	Sikar	280,028
34	Dhod	SC	Sikar	Sikar	279,128
35	Sikar	None	Sikar	Sikar	290,632
36	Danta Ramgarh	None	Sikar	Sikar	289,982
37	Khandela	None	Sikar	Sikar	267,504
38	Neem Ka Thana	None	Neem Ka Thana	Sikar	273,971
39	Srimadhopur	None	Neem Ka Thana	Sikar	279,757
40	Kotputli	None	Kotputli-Behror	Jaipur Rural	228,953
41	Viratnagar	None	Kotputli-Behror	Jaipur Rural	232,401
42	Shahpura	None	Jaipur	Jaipur Rural	234,648
43	Chomu	None	Jaipur Rural	Sikar	252,985
44	Phulera	None	Jaipur Rural	Jaipur Rural	262,555
45	Dudu	SC	Dudu	Ajmer	254,253
46	Jhotwara	None	Jaipur	Jaipur Rural	429,027
47	Amber	None	Jaipur	Jaipur Rural	289,646
48	Jamwa Ramgarh	ST	Jaipur Rural	Jaipur Rural	232,217
49	Hawa Mahal	None	Jaipur	Jaipur	254,408
50	Vidhyadhar Nagar	None	Jaipur	Jaipur	342,342
51	Civil Lines	None	Jaipur	Jaipur	245,558
52	Kishanpole	None	Jaipur	Jaipur	192,664
53	Adarsh Nagar	None	Jaipur	Jaipur	268,419
54	Malviya Nagar	None	Jaipur	Jaipur	216,988
55	Sanganer	None	Jaipur	Jaipur	350,245
56	Bagru	SC	Jaipur Rural	Jaipur	352,631
57	Bassi	ST	Jaipur Rural	Dausa	234,748
58	Chaksu	SC	Jaipur Rural	Dausa	231,087
59	Tijara	None	Khairthal-Tijara	Alwar	262,727
60	Kishangarh Bas	None	Khairthal-Tijara	Alwar	256,777
61	Mundawar	None	Khairthal-Tijara	Alwar	241,615
62	Behror	None	Alwar	Alwar	237,305
63	Bansur	None	Alwar	Jaipur Rural	254,753
64	Thanagazi	None	Alwar	Dausa	221,610
65	Alwar Rural	SC	Alwar	Alwar	262,695
66	Alwar Urban	None	Alwar	Alwar	263,585
67	Ramgarh	None	Alwar	Alwar	271,744
68	Rajgarh Laxmangarh	ST	Alwar	Alwar	264,846
69	Kathumar	SC	Alwar	Bharatpur	229,399
70	Kaman	None	Deeg	Bharatpur	265,803
71	Nagar	None	Deeg	Bharatpur	250,148
72	Deeg-Kumher	None	Deeg	Bharatpur	257,527
73	Bharatpur	None	Bharatpur	Bharatpur	279,032
74	Nadbai	None	Bharatpur	Bharatpur	291,897
75	Weir	SC	Bharatpur	Bharatpur	272,377
76	Bayana	SC	Bharatpur	Bharatpur	266,511
77	Baseri	SC	Dholpur	Karauli–Dholpur	203,227
78	Bari	None	Dholpur	Karauli–Dholpur	237,355
79	Dholpur	None	Dholpur	Karauli–Dholpur	223,263
80	Rajakhera	None	Dholpur	Karauli–Dholpur	214,923
81	Todabhim	ST	Karauli	Karauli–Dholpur	281,647
82	Hindaun	SC	Karauli	Karauli–Dholpur	276,907
83	Karauli	None	Karauli	Karauli–Dholpur	256,916
84	Sapotra	ST	Karauli	Karauli–Dholpur	275,004
85	Bandikui	None	Dausa	Dausa	222,388
86	Mahuwa	None	Dausa	Dausa	221,302
87	Sikrai	SC	Dausa	Dausa	263,403
88	Dausa	None	Dausa	Dausa	243,483
89	Lalsot	ST	Dausa	Dausa	255,270
90	Gangapur	None	Gangapur City	Tonk-Sawai Madhopur	268,610
91	Bamanwas	ST	Gangapur City	Tonk-Sawai Madhopur	243,526
92	Sawai Madhopur	None	Sawai Madhopur	Tonk-Sawai Madhopur	256,555
93	Khandar	SC	Sawai Madhopur	Tonk-Sawai Madhopur	247,830
94	Malpura	None	Tonk	Tonk-Sawai Madhopur	271,358
95	Niwai	SC	Tonk	Tonk-Sawai Madhopur	284,986
96	Tonk	None	Tonk	Tonk-Sawai Madhopur	253,193
97	Deoli-Uniara	None	Tonk	Tonk-Sawai Madhopur	297,316
98	Kishangarh	None	Ajmer	Ajmer	282,655
99	Pushkar	None	Ajmer	Ajmer	251,989
100	Ajmer North	None	Ajmer	Ajmer	209,862
101	Ajmer South	SC	Ajmer	Ajmer	210,287
102	Nasirabad	None	Ajmer	Ajmer	210,287
103	Beawar	None	Beawar	Rajsamand	258,434
104	Masuda	None	Beawar	Ajmer	272,284
105	Kekri	None	Kekri	Ajmer	261,747
106	Ladnun	None	Didwana Kuchaman	Nagaur	269,255
107	Deedwana	None	Didwana Kuchaman	Nagaur	265,866
108	Jayal	SC	Nagaur	Nagaur	262,399
109	Nagaur	None	Nagaur	Nagaur	270,729
110	Khinwsar	None	Nagaur	Nagaur	283,052
111	Merta	SC	Nagaur	Rajsamand	286,760
112	Degana	None	Nagaur	Rajsamand	265,839
113	Makrana	None	Didwana Kuchaman	Nagaur	271,866
114	Parbatsar	None	Didwana Kuchaman	Nagaur	250,433
115	Nawan	None	Didwana Kuchaman	Nagaur	269,093
116	Jaitaran	None	Pali	Rajsamand	308,939
117	Sojat	None	Pali	Pali	246,238
118	Pali	None	Pali	Pali	274,659
119	Marwar Junction	None	Pali	Pali	294,959
120	Bali	None	Pali	Pali	332,830
121	Sumerpur	None	Pali	Pali	311,205
122	Phalodi	None	Phalodi	Jodhpur	257,492
123	Lohawat	None	Phalodi	Jodhpur	268,240
124	Shergarh	None	Jodhpur Rural	Jodhpur	275,874
125	Osian	None	Jodhpur Rural	Pali	266,268
126	Bhopalgarh	SC	Jodhpur Rural	Pali	305,201
127	Sardarpura	None	Jodhpur	Jodhpur	257,772
128	Jodhpur	None	Jodhpur	Jodhpur	199,714
129	Soorsagar	None	Jodhpur	Jodhpur	288,679
130	Luni	None	Jodhpur Rural	Jodhpur	335,169
131	Bilara	SC	Jodhpur Rural	Pali	290,409
132	Jaisalmer	None	Jaisalmer	Barmer	253,418
133	Pokaran	None	Jaisalmer	Jodhpur	224,665
134	Sheo	None	Barmer	Barmer	300,843
135	Barmer	None	Barmer	Barmer	264,863
136	Baytoo	None	Balotra	Barmer	252,401
137	Pachpadra	None	Balotra	Barmer	252,957
138	Siwana	None	Balotra	Barmer	276,251
139	Gudha Malani	None	Barmer	Barmer	270,134
140	Chohtan	SC	Barmer	Barmer	309,744
141	Ahore	None	Jalore	Jalore	271,455
142	Jalore	SC	Jalore	Jalore	287,956
143	Bhinmal	None	Jalore	Jalore	308,859
144	Sanchore	None	Sanchore	Jalore	315,319
145	Raniwara	None	Sanchore	Jalore	271,874
146	Sirohi	None	Sirohi	Jalore	304,492
147	Pindwara-Abu	ST	Sirohi	Jalore	228,333
148	Reodar	SC	Sirohi	Jalore	283,584
149	Gogunda	ST	Udaipur	Udaipur	264,810
150	Jhadol	ST	Udaipur	Udaipur	273,497
151	Kherwara	ST	Udaipur	Udaipur	297,710
152	Udaipur Rural	ST	Udaipur	Udaipur	285,214
153	Udaipur	None	Udaipur	Udaipur	246,410
154	Mavli	None	Udaipur	Chittorgarh	258,065
155	Vallabhnagar	None	Udaipur	Chittorgarh	264,780
156	Salumber	ST	Salumbar	Udaipur	295,173
157	Dhariawad	ST	Pratapgarh	Udaipur	274,756
158	Dungarpur	ST	Dungarpur	Banswara	263,301
159	Aspur	ST	Dungarpur	Udaipur	270,023
160	Sagwara	ST	Dungarpur	Banswara	276,048
161	Chorasi	ST	Dungarpur	Banswara	250,160
162	Ghatol	ST	Banswara	Banswara	281,420
163	Garhi	ST	Banswara	Banswara	289,357
164	Banswara	ST	Banswara	Banswara	281,013
165	Bagidora	ST	Banswara	Banswara	264,743
166	Kushalgarh	ST	Banswara	Banswara	264,875
167	Kapasan	SC	Chittorgarh	Chittorgarh	269,727
168	Begun	None	Chittorgarh	Chittorgarh	279,580
169	Chittorgarh	None	Chittorgarh	Chittorgarh	270,246
170	Nimbahera	None	Chittorgarh	Chittorgarh	276,158
171	Bari Sadri	None	Chittorgarh	Chittorgarh	274,987
172	Pratapgarh	ST	Pratapgarh	Chittorgarh	259,074
173	Bhim	None	Rajsamand	Rajsamand	231,185
174	Kumbhalgarh	None	Rajsamand	Rajsamand	226,463
175	Rajsamand	None	Rajsamand	Rajsamand	232,184
176	Nathdwara	None	Rajsamand	Rajsamand	238,585
177	Asind	None	Bhilwara	Bhilwara	296,914
178	Mandal	None	Bhilwara	Bhilwara	271,134
179	Sahara	None	Bhilwara	Bhilwara	254,268
180	Bhilwara	None	Bhilwara	Bhilwara	279,899
181	Shahpura	SC	Shahpura	Bhilwara	252,867
182	Jahazpur	None	Shahpura	Bhilwara	247,891
183	Mandalgarh	None	Bhilwara	Bhilwara	248,734
184	Hindoli	None	Bundi	Bhilwara	273,581
185	Keshoraipatan	SC	Bundi	Kota	277,861
186	Bundi	None	Bundi	Kota	309,342
187	Pipalda	None	Kota	Kota	210,017
188	Sangod	None	Kota	Kota	209,921
189	Kota North	None	Kota	Kota	255,734
190	Kota South	None	Kota	Kota	244,959
191	Ladpura	None	Kota	Kota	290,305
192	Ramganj Mandi	SC	Kota	Kota	248,061
193	Anta	None	Baran	Jhalawar-Baran	217,028
194	Kishanganj	ST	Baran	Jhalawar-Baran	231,679
195	Baran-Atru	SC	Baran	Jhalawar-Baran	240,979
196	Chhabra	None	Baran	Jhalawar-Baran	244,570
197	Dag	SC	Jhalawar	Jhalawar-Baran	264,695
198	Jhalrapatan	None	Jhalawar	Jhalawar-Baran	297,916
199	Khanpur	None	Jhalawar	Jhalawar-Baran	247,156
200	Manohar Thana	None	Jhalawar	Jhalawar-Baran	266,509
