= 2013 Rajasthan Legislative Assembly election =

Election in Indian state

- 1 December 2013 (199 seats); 13 December 2013 (1 seat)

199 of all 200 seats in the Rajasthan Legislative Assembly 101 seats needed for a majority
- Turnout: 75.67% (▲9.42%)
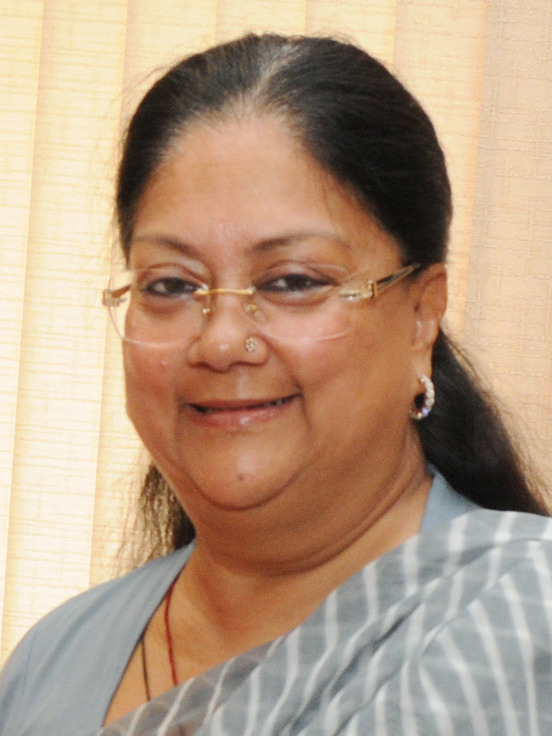

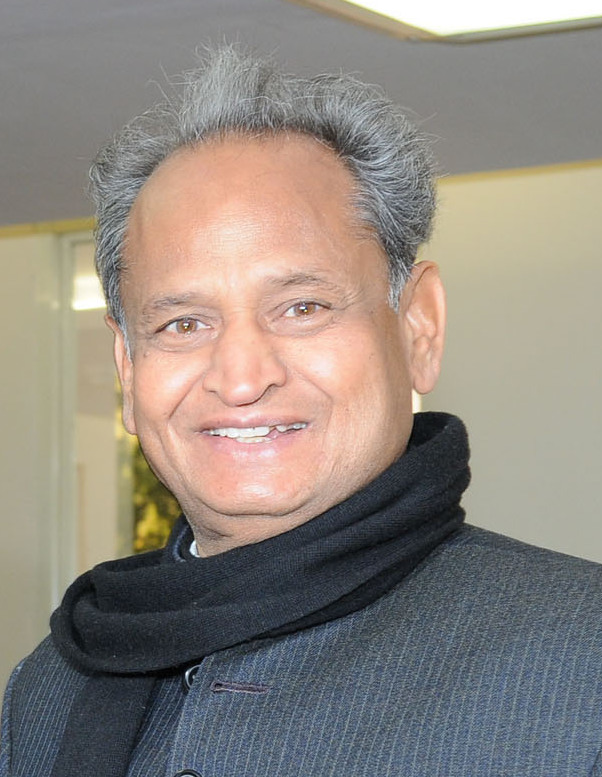
	First party	Second party
Leader	Vasundhara Raje	Ashok Gehlot
Party	BJP	INC
Alliance	NDA	UPA
Leader since	2003	1998
Leader's seat	Jhalrapatan	Sardarpura
Last election	78	96
Seats after	163	21
Seat change	▲85	▼75
Popular vote	13,939,203	10,204,694
Percentage	45.17%	33.07%
Swing	▲10.9%	▼3.75%
- Seatwise map of the election results

- Structure of the Rajasthan Legislative Assembly after the election
Chief Minister before election
Ashok Gehlot
INC
Elected Chief Minister
Vasundhara Raje
BJP

Legislative Assembly elections were held in the Indian state of Rajasthan on 1 December 2013. Results were announced on 8 December. The incumbent ruling party Indian National Congress, led by the Chief Minister Ashok Gehlot, lost the elections to Vasundhara Raje-led BJP, who was being touted as the next incumbent.

== Pre-poll surveys ==
Survey	Date	BJP	INC	Others (Include BSP)	Source
Headlines Today-C Voter	September 2013	97	79	24	
Times Now-India TV-C Voter	September 2013	118	64	18	
CNN-IBN-The Week-CSDS	October 2013	115-125	60-68	12-20 (BSP 4–8)	

== Election ==
Polling was held on 1 December in 198 assembly seats out of 200 seats. Churu constituency polling was postponed to 13 December due to death of BSP candidate Jagdish Meghwal.

Voter-verified paper audit trail (VVPAT) along with EVMs was used in 1 assembly seat in Rajasthan elections. There were 2,087 candidates including 166 women and one eunuch candidate. INC and BJP contested on all 200 seats while BSP on 195 seats. 38 CPI(M), 23 CPI, 16 NCP, 666 other parties candidates and 758 Independents were also in foray. Over 4.08 crore voters including 1.92 crore women were eligible to exercise their vote. There were 47,223 polling booths. Total voting turnout was 74.38%, the highest ever in state assembly election. The highest turnout (85.52%) was recorded at Jaisalmer and the lowest (55.21%) at Bharatpur.

== Parties contested ==
Party	Flag	Symbol	Leader	Seats contested
Indian National Congress			Ashok Gehlot	200
Bharatiya Janata Party			Vasundhara Raje Scindia	200
Bahujan Samaj Party			Mayawati	195
National People's Party			P. A. Sangma	134
Samajwadi Party			Mulayam Singh Yadav	56
Communist Party of India (Marxist)			Sitaram Yechuri	38
National Unionist Zamindara Party			B. D. Agarwal	25
Nationalist Congress Party			Sharad Pawar	16
Other Parties and Independents			none	1346

== Results ==
The results were declared on 8 December. Chief Minister Ashok Gehlot won from his Sardarpura constituency by a margin of 18,478 votes while Vasundhara Raje won from Jhalarpatan by 60,896 votes. The election also recorded best and worst performances for the BJP and the Congress respectively in the state. Influential Meena leader and MP from Dausa, Kirori Lal Meena received a big setback when his newly formed party, National People's Party won only four seats.

Summary of the 1 December 2013 Rajasthan Legislative Assembly election results
Parties and coalitions	Popular vote			Seats			
Parties and coalitions	Votes	%	±pp	Contested	Won	+/−	%
Bharatiya Janata Party (BJP)	13,939,203	45.2	▲10.9	200	193	▲115	81.5
Indian National Congress (INC)	10,204,694	33.1	▼3.7	200	1	▼95	10.5
Independents (IND)	2,533,224	8.2	▼6.8	758	1	▼14	3.5
National People's Party (NPP)	1,312,402	4.3	▲4.3	134	3	▲3	2.0
Bahujan Samaj Party (BSP)	1,041,241	3.4	▼4.2	195	2	▼2	1.5
National Unionist Zamindara Party (NUZP)	312,653	1.0	▲1.0	25	0	▲0	1.0
Communist Party of India (Marxist) (CPM)	269,002	0.9	▼0.7	38	0	▼3	0.0
Samajwadi Party (SP)	118,911	0.4	▼0.4	56	0	▼1	0.0
Janata Dal (United) (JD(U))	59,673	0.2	▼0.3	15	0	▼1	0.0
Other parties and candidates	479,700	1.4	▼2.0	573	0	▼1	0.0
None of the Above (NOTA)	589,923	1.9	▲1.9				
Total	30,860,626	100.00		2194	200	±0	100.0
Valid votes	30,860,626	99.89					
Invalid votes	35,113	0.11					
Votes cast / turnout	30,895,739	75.67					
Abstentions	9,933,573	24.33					
Registered voters	40,829,312						
Source: Election Commission of India

=== Region-wise results ===
Region	Seats	Bharatiya Janata Party		Indian National Congress		Others
Marwad	46	40	▲21	5	▼15	1
Bagar	21	16	▲8	1	▼10	4
Harouti	57	43	▲17	8	▼11	6
Shekhawati	16	9	▲08	3	▼01	4
Mewar	60	55	▲36	4	▼34	1
Total	200	163	▲90	21	▼75	16

=== Results by district ===
District	Seats				
District	Seats	BJP	INC	IND	OTH
Ajmer	5	5	—N/a	—N/a	—N/a
Alwar	8	6	1	—N/a	1
Anupgarh	3	2	—N/a	—N/a	1
Balotra	3	3	—N/a	—N/a	—N/a
Banswara	5	4	1	—N/a	—N/a
Baran	4	4	—N/a	—N/a	—N/a
Barmer	4	3	1	—N/a	—N/a
Beawar	2	2	—N/a	—N/a	—N/a
Bharatpur	4	4	—N/a	—N/a	—N/a
Bhilwara	5	5	—N/a	—N/a	—N/a
Bikaner	6	3	2	1	—N/a
Bundi	3	2	1	—N/a	—N/a
Chittorgarh	5	5	—N/a	—N/a	—N/a
Churu	6	4	1	—N/a	1
Dausa	5	3	—N/a	—N/a	2
Deeg	3	2	1	—N/a	—N/a
Dholpur	4	1	2	—N/a	1
Didwana Kuchaman	5	5	—N/a	—N/a	—N/a
Dudu	1	1	—N/a	—N/a	—N/a
Dungarpur	4	4	—N/a	—N/a	—N/a
Ganganagar	4	3	—N/a	—N/a	1
Gangapur City	2	2	—N/a	—N/a	—N/a
Hanumangarh	5	5	—N/a	—N/a	—N/a
Jaipur	10	9	—N/a	—N/a	1
Jaipur Rural	6	5	—N/a	1	—N/a
Jaisalmer	2	2	—N/a	—N/a	—N/a
Jalore	3	3	—N/a	—N/a	—N/a
Jhalawar	4	4	—N/a	—N/a	—N/a
Jhunjhunu	7	3	1	2	1
Jodhpur	3	2	1	—N/a	—N/a
Jodhpur Rural	5	5	—N/a	—N/a	—N/a
Karauli	4	1	3	—N/a	—N/a
Kekri	1	1	—N/a	—N/a	—N/a
Khairthal-Tijara	3	3	—N/a	—N/a	—N/a
Kota	6	6	—N/a	—N/a	—N/a
Kotputli-Behror	2	1	1	—N/a	—N/a
Nagaur	5	4	—N/a	1	—N/a
Neem Ka Thana	2	2	—N/a	—N/a	—N/a
Pali	6	6	—N/a	—N/a	—N/a
Phalodi	2	2	—N/a	—N/a	—N/a
Pratapgarh	2	2	—N/a	—N/a	—N/a
Rajsamand	4	4	—N/a	—N/a	—N/a
Salumbar	1	1	—N/a	—N/a	—N/a
Sanchore	2	1	1	—N/a	—N/a
Sawai Madhopur	2	2	—N/a	—N/a	—N/a
Shahpura	2	1	1	—N/a	—N/a
Sikar	6	3	2	1	—N/a
Sirohi	3	3	—N/a	—N/a	—N/a
Tonk	4	4	—N/a	—N/a	—N/a
Udaipur	7	5	1	1	—N/a
Total	200	163	21	7	9 (Note: NOTE: OTH means other parties other than the listed which won seats (this includes the Bahujan Samaj Party [BSP], National People's Party [NPP], and National Unionist Zamindara Party [NUZP]))

== Elected members ==
District	Constituency		Winner				Runner Up				Margin	%
District	No.	Name	Candidate	Party	Votes	%	Candidate	Party	Votes	%	Margin	%
Ganganagar	1	Sadulshahar	Gurjant Singh	BJP	47,184	28.57	Jagdish Chander	INC	42,376	25.66	4,808	2.91
Ganganagar	2	Ganganagar	Kamini Jindal	NUZP	77,860	51.67	Radheshyam Ganganagar	BJP	40,792	27.07	37,068	24.60
Ganganagar	3	Karanpur	Surender Pal Singh	BJP	70,147	41.71	Gurmeet Singh	INC	66,294	39.42	3,853	2.29
Ganganagar	4	Suratgarh	Rajendar Singh Bhadu	BJP	66,766	39.59	Dungar Ram Gedar	BSP	39,987	23.71	26,779	15.88
Anupgarh	5	Raisinghnagar (SC)	Sonadevi	NUZP	65,782	36.78	Balveer Singh	BJP	44,544	24.91	21,238	11.87
Anupgarh	6	Anupgarh (SC)	Shimla Bawri	BJP	51,145	32.61	Shimla Devi Nayak	NUZP	39,999	25.50	11,146	7.11
Hanumangarh	7	Sangaria	Krishan Kadva	BJP	55,635	32.01	Shabnam	INC	44,034	25.33	11,601	6.68
Hanumangarh	8	Hanumangarh	Rampratap	BJP	88,387	45.53	Vinod Kumar	INC	57,900	29.83	30,487	15.70
Hanumangarh	9	Pilibanga (SC)	Dropati	BJP	63,845	33.00	Vinod Kumar	INC	53,647	27.73	10,198	5.27
Hanumangarh	10	Nohar	Abhishek Matoria	BJP	96,637	51.69	Rajendra	INC	69,686	37.27	26,951	14.42
Hanumangarh	11	Bhadra	Sanjeev Kumar	BJP	65,040	35.39	Balwan Singh Poonia	CPI(M)	38,552	20.98	26,488	14.41
Anupgarh	12	Khajuwala (SC)	Vishwanath	BJP	61,833	46.88	Govind Ram	INC	53,476	40.54	8,357	6.34
Bikaner	13	Bikaner West	Gopal Krishna	BJP	65,129	49.85	Dr. Bulaki Das Kalla	INC	58,705	44.94	6,424	4.91
Bikaner	14	Bikaner East	Siddhi Kumari	BJP	77,839	58.77	Gopal Lal Gahlot	INC	46,162	34.85	31,677	23.92
Bikaner	15	Kolayat	Bhanwar Singh	INC	68,029	47.57	Devi Singh Bhati	BJP	66,895	46.78	1,134	0.79
Bikaner	16	Lunkaransar	Manik Chand Surana	IND	52,532	35.40	Sumit Godara	BJP	47,715	32.15	4,817	3.25
Bikaner	17	Dungargarh	Kishana Ram	BJP	78,278	50.34	Mangla Ram Godara	INC	62,076	39.92	16,202	10.42
Bikaner	18	Nokha	Rameshwar Lal Dudi	INC	70,801	43.94	Kanhaya Lal Jhanwar	IND	40,007	24.83	30,794	19.11
Churu	19	Sadulpur	Manoj Kumar	BSP	59,624	38.21	Kamla	BJP	54,798	35.12	4,826	3.09
Churu	20	Taranagar	Jai Narayan Pooniya	BJP	65,654	41.62	Chandrashekhar Baid	INC	54,518	34.56	11,136	7.06
Churu	21	Sardarshahar	Bhanwarlal	INC	86,732	48.21	Ashok Kumar	BJP	79,675	44.28	7,057	3.93
Churu	22	Churu	Rajendra Rathore	BJP	84,100	55.21	Haji Maqbool Mandelia	INC	60,098	39.46	24,002	15.75
Churu	23	Ratangarh	Raj Kumar Rinwa	BJP	87,289	55.96	Pusaram Godara	INC	62,131	39.83	25,158	16.13
Churu	24	Sujangarh (SC)	Khemaram	BJP	78,920	50.54	Master Bhanwarlal	INC	65,271	41.80	13,649	8.74
Jhunjhunu	25	Pilani (SC)	Sunderlal	BJP	72,914	50.52	J. P. Chandelia	IND	58,918	40.82	13,996	9.70
Jhunjhunu	26	Surajgarh	Santosh Ahlawat	BJP	1,08,840	61.99	Sharwan Kumar	INC	58,621	33.39	50,219	28.60
Jhunjhunu	27	Jhunjhunu	Brijendra Singh Ola	INC	60,929	41.84	Rajiv Singh	BJP	42,517	29.19	18,412	12.65
Jhunjhunu	28	Mandawa	Narendra Kumar	IND	58,637	40.85	Rita Choudhary	IND	41,519	28.93	17,118	11.92
Jhunjhunu	29	Nawalgarh	Dr. Rajkumar Sharma	IND	76,845	47.88	Pratibha Singh	INC	43,279	26.97	33,566	20.91
Jhunjhunu	30	Udaipurwati	Shubhkaran Choudhary	BJP	57,960	39.48	Rajendra Madhosingh	INC	46,089	31.39	11,871	8.09
Jhunjhunu	31	Khetri	Pooranmal Saini	BSP	42,432	32.30	Jitendra Singh	INC	34,582	26.32	7,850	5.98
Sikar	32	Fatehpur	Nand Kishore Maharia	IND	53,884	37.79	Bhanwaru Khan	INC	49,958	35.04	3,926	2.75
Sikar	33	Lachhmangarh	Govind Singh Dotasara	INC	55,730	34.32	Subhash Maharia	BJP	45,007	27.71	10,723	6.61
Sikar	34	Dhod (SC)	Gordhan	BJP	88,668	54.91	Pema Ram	CPI(M)	43,597	27.00	45,071	27.91
Sikar	35	Sikar	Ratan Lal Jaldhari	BJP	59,587	37.24	Rajendra Pareek	INC	46,572	29.10	13,015	8.14
Sikar	36	Danta Ramgarh	Narayan Singh	INC	60,926	36.84	Harish Chandra	BJP	60,351	36.49	575	0.35
Sikar	37	Khandela	Banshidhar	BJP	81,837	54.59	Giriraj	INC	46,443	30.98	35,394	23.61
Neem Ka Thana	38	Neem Ka Thana	Prem Singh Bajor	BJP	69,613	45.30	Ramesh Chand Khandelwal	INC	35,411	23.04	34,202	22.26
Neem Ka Thana	39	Srimadhopur	Jhabar Singh Kharra	BJP	75,101	46.47	Deependra Singh	INC	67,199	41.58	7,902	4.89
Kotputli-Behror	40	Kotputli	Rajendra Singh Yadav	INC	47,973	34.82	Banwari Lal Yadav	BJP	23,286	16.90	24,687	17.92
Kotputli-Behror	41	Viratnagar	Dr. Phoolchand Bhinda	BJP	57,902	45.33	Ramchandra	INC	48,504	37.97	9,398	7.36
Jaipur	42	Shahpura	Rao Rajendra Singh	BJP	57,021	40.58	Alok Beniwal	INC	54,624	38.88	2,397	1.70
Jaipur Rural	43	Chomu	Ramlal Sharma	BJP	93,516	61.14	Bhagwan Sahay Saini	INC	49,043	32.06	44,473	29.08
Jaipur Rural	44	Phulera	Nirmal Kumawat	BJP	84,722	54.92	Bajrang	INC	60,425	39.17	24,297	15.75
Dudu	45	Dudu (SC)	Dr. Premchand Bairwa	BJP	86,239	57.36	Hazari Lal Nagar	INC	52,519	34.93	33,720	22.43
Jaipur	46	Jhotwara	Rajpal Singh Shekhawat	BJP	83,858	38.25	Dr. Rekha Kataria	INC	64,256	29.31	19,602	8.94
Jaipur	47	Amber	Navin Pilania	NPP	51,103	31.22	Satish Poonia	BJP	50,774	31.02	329	0.20
Jaipur Rural	48	Jamwa Ramgarh (ST)	Jagdish Narayan	BJP	64,162	47.79	Shankar Lal	INC	32,261	24.03	31,901	23.76
Jaipur	49	Hawa Mahal	Surendra Pareek	BJP	69,924	48.89	Brij Kishore Sharma	INC	57,209	40.00	12,715	8.89
Jaipur	50	Vidhyadhar Nagar	Narpat Singh Rajvi	BJP	1,07,068	55.36	Vikram Singh Shekhawat	INC	69,155	35.76	37,913	19.60
Jaipur	51	Civil Lines	Arun Chaturvedi	BJP	77,693	51.61	Pratap Singh Khachariyawas	INC	66,564	44.22	11,129	7.39
Jaipur	52	Kishanpole	Mohan Lal Gupta	BJP	68,240	50.47	Amin Kagzi	INC	58,555	43.31	9,685	7.16
Jaipur	53	Adarsh Nagar	Ashok Parnami	BJP	70,201	47.22	Mahir Azad	INC	66,398	44.66	3,803	2.56
Jaipur	54	Malviya Nagar	Kalicharan Saraf	BJP	89,974	65.02	Dr. Archana Sharma	INC	41,256	29.82	48,718	35.20
Jaipur	55	Sanganer	Ghanshyam Tiwari	BJP	1,12,465	65.59	Sanjay Bapna	INC	47,115	27.48	65,350	38.11
Jaipur Rural	56	Bagru (SC)	Kailash Verma	BJP	1,00,947	57.34	Dr. Prahlad Raghu	INC	54,591	31.01	46,356	26.33
Jaipur Rural	57	Bassi (ST)	Anju Devi Dhanka	IND	48,095	33.42	Avanti Meena	NPP	36,756	25.54	11,339	7.88
Jaipur Rural	58	Chaksu (SC)	Laxminarain Bairwa	BJP	53,977	39.44	Prakash Chand Bairwa	INC	41,619	30.41	12,358	9.03
Khairthal-Tijara	59	Tijara	Maman Singh Yadav	BJP	69,278	47.67	Fazal Hussain	BSP	31,284	21.53	37,994	26.14
Khairthal-Tijara	60	Kishangarh Bas	Ramhet Singh Yadav	BJP	71,354	46.43	Deep Chand Khairiya	INC	56,538	36.79	14,816	9.64
Khairthal-Tijara	61	Mundawar	Dharam Pal Choudhary	BJP	81,798	54.86	O. P. Yadav	INC	52,381	35.13	29,417	19.73
Alwar	62	Behror	Jaswant Singh Yadav	BJP	53,835	37.60	Baljeet Yadav	IND	35,250	24.62	18,585	12.98
Alwar	63	Bansur	Shakuntla Rawat	INC	71,328	49.70	Rohitash Kumar	BJP	47,412	33.04	23,916	16.66
Alwar	64	Thanagazi	Hem Singh Bhadana	BJP	52,583	39.01	Kanti Prasad	NPP	48,851	36.24	3,732	2.77
Alwar	65	Alwar Rural (SC)	Jairam Jatav	BJP	60,066	42.42	Tikaram Jully	INC	33,267	23.49	26,799	18.93
Alwar	66	Alwar Urban	Banwari Lal Singhal	BJP	84,791	60.34	Narendra Sharma	INC	22,562	16.05	62,229	44.29
Alwar	67	Ramgarh	Gyandev Ahuja	BJP	73,842	47.18	Zubair Khan	INC	69,195	44.21	4,647	2.97
Alwar	68	Rajgarh Laxmangarh (ST)	Golma	NPP	64,926	41.27	Surajbhan Dhanka	SP	56,798	36.10	8,128	5.17
Alwar	69	Kathumar (SC)	Mangal Ram	BJP	53,483	39.93	Ramesh Khinchi	INC	37,753	28.18	15,730	11.75
Deeg	70	Kaman	Ku. Jagat Singh	BJP	74,415	46.88	Zahida Khan	INC	71,058	44.77	3,357	2.11
Deeg	71	Nagar	Anita	BJP	44,670	30.47	Wajib Ali	NPP	36,557	24.94	8,113	5.53
Deeg	72	Deeg-Kumher	Vishvendra Singh	INC	71,407	47.99	Dr. Digamber Singh	BJP	60,245	40.49	11,162	7.50
Bharatpur	73	Bharatpur	Vijay Bansal	BJP	57,515	38.94	Dalveer Singh	BSP	34,821	23.57	22,694	15.37
Bharatpur	74	Nadbai	Krishnendra Kaur	BJP	60,990	39.13	Ghanshyam (Baba)	BSP	46,434	29.79	14,556	9.34
Bharatpur	75	Weir (SC)	Bahadur Singh	BJP	53,649	36.43	Om Prakash Pahadiya	INC	40,226	27.31	13,423	9.12
Bharatpur	76	Bayana (SC)	Bachchu Singh	BJP	43,868	30.69	Ritu Banavat	IND	38,057	26.63	5,811	4.06
Dholpur	77	Baseri (SC)	Rani Silautia	BJP	38,678	36.78	Chhitaria	NPP	32,930	31.32	5,748	5.46
Dholpur	78	Bari	Girraj Singh	INC	53,482	36.08	Jaswant	BJP	50,681	34.19	2,801	1.89
Dholpur	79	Dholpur	B. L. Kushwah	BSP	49,892	37.86	Banwari Lal Sharma	INC	40,683	30.87	9,209	6.99
Dholpur	80	Rajakhera	Pradhyumn Singh	INC	58,880	47.80	Vivek Singh Bohara	BJP	32,868	26.68	26,012	21.12
Karauli	81	Todabhim (ST)	Ghanshyam	INC	50,955	35.50	Prathviraj Meena	NPP	43,946	30.62	7,009	4.88
Karauli	82	Hindaun (SC)	Rajkumari	BJP	59,059	41.04	Bharosilal	INC	50,948	35.40	8,111	5.64
Karauli	83	Karauli	Darshan Singh	INC	52,361	36.03	Rohini Kumari	BJP	35,194	24.22	17,167	11.81
Karauli	84	Sapotra (ST)	Ramesh	INC	52,555	36.83	Rishikesh	BJP	46,323	32.47	6,232	4.36
Dausa	85	Bandikui	Alka Singh	BJP	41,136	29.60	Shailendra Joshi	NPP	35,359	25.44	5,777	4.16
Dausa	86	Mahuwa	Omprakash	BJP	52,378	40.89	Golma	NPP	36,720	28.67	15,658	12.22
Dausa	87	Sikrai (SC)	Geeta Verma	NPP	49,053	33.57	Nand Lal Bansiwal	BJP	45,354	31.04	3,699	2.53
Dausa	88	Dausa	Shankar Lal Sharma	BJP	65,904	46.16	Murari Lal	INC	40,732	28.53	25,172	17.63
Dausa	89	Lalsot (ST)	Dr. Kirodi Lal	NPP	43,887	30.66	Parsadi Lal	INC	43,396	30.31	491	0.35
Gangapur City	90	Gangapur	Man Singh	BJP	54,228	38.70	Ramkesh	INC	25,853	18.45	28,375	20.25
Gangapur City	91	Bamanwas (ST)	Kunji Lal	BJP	45,085	36.44	Nawal Kishore	INC	39,423	31.86	5,662	4.58
Sawai Madhopur	92	Sawai Madhopur	Rajkumari Diyakumari	BJP	57,384	36.86	Dr. Kirodilal	NPP	49,852	32.02	7,532	4.84
Sawai Madhopur	93	Khandar (SC)	Jitendra Kumar Gothwal	BJP	58,609	41.21	Ashok	INC	39,267	27.61	19,342	13.60
Tonk	94	Malpura	Kanhiyalal	BJP	76,799	49.40	Rambilas Choudhary	INC	36,578	23.53	40,221	25.87
Tonk	95	Niwai (SC)	Hira Lal	BJP	66,764	43.05	Prashant	INC	60,828	39.22	5,936	3.83
Tonk	96	Tonk	Ajit Singh	BJP	66,845	46.96	Saud Saidi	IND	36,502	25.64	30,343	21.32
Tonk	97	Deoli-Uniara	Rajendra Gujar	BJP	85,228	51.08	Ramnarain Meena	INC	55,593	33.32	29,635	17.76
Ajmer	98	Kishangarh	Bhagirath Choudhary	BJP	95,384	55.33	Nathu Ram Sinodiya	INC	64,310	37.30	31,074	18.03
Ajmer	99	Pushkar	Suresh Singh Rawat	BJP	90,013	59.82	Naseem Akhtar Insaf	INC	48,723	32.38	41,290	27.44
Ajmer	100	Ajmer North	Vasudev Devnani	BJP	68,461	56.38	Dr. Shrigopal Baheti	INC	47,982	39.52	20,479	16.86
Ajmer	101	Ajmer South (SC)	Anita Bhadel	BJP	70,509	57.28	Hemant Bhati	INC	47,351	38.47	23,158	18.81
Ajmer	102	Nasirabad	Sanwar Lal	BJP	84,953	55.40	Mahendra Singh	INC	56,053	36.55	28,900	18.85
Beawar	103	Beawar	Shankar Singh	BJP	80,574	55.63	Manoj Chauhan	INC	37,665	26.01	42,909	29.62
Beawar	104	Masuda	Sushil Kanwar	BJP	34,011	20.25	Brahmdev Kumawat	INC	29,536	17.59	4,475	2.66
Kekri	105	Kekri	Shatrughan Gautam	BJP	71,292	44.64	Dr. Raghu Sharma	INC	62,425	39.09	8,867	5.55
Didwana Kuchaman	106	Ladnun	Manohar Singh	BJP	73,345	51.08	Harjiram Burdak	INC	50,294	35.03	23,051	16.05
Didwana Kuchaman	107	Deedwana	Yoonus Khan	BJP	68,795	45.12	Chetan Choudhary	INC	57,351	37.61	11,444	7.51
Nagaur	108	Jayal (SC)	Dr. Manju Baghmar	BJP	72,738	51.68	Manju Devi	INC	59,629	42.37	13,109	9.31
Nagaur	109	Nagaur	Habibur Rahman Lamba	BJP	67,143	45.74	Harendra Mirdha	IND	61,288	41.75	5,855	3.99
Nagaur	110	Khinwsar	Hanuman Beniwal	IND	65,399	41.66	Durg Singh	BSP	42,379	26.99	23,020	14.67
Nagaur	111	Merta (SC)	Sukharam	BJP	78,069	52.97	Laxman Ram	INC	42,520	28.85	35,549	24.12
Nagaur	112	Degana	Ajay Singh	BJP	79,526	51.83	Richhpal Singh	INC	65,044	42.39	14,482	9.44
Didwana Kuchaman	113	Makrana	Shreeram Bhinchar	BJP	74,274	46.49	Zakir Husain Gesawat	INC	62,496	39.12	11,778	7.37
Didwana Kuchaman	114	Parbatsar	Mansingh Kinsariya	BJP	75,236	51.59	Lachchha Ram Badarda	INC	58,938	40.42	16,298	11.17
Didwana Kuchaman	115	Nawan	Vijay Singh	BJP	85,008	55.23	Mahendra Choudhary	INC	55,229	35.88	29,779	19.35
Pali	116	Jaitaran	Surendra Goyal	BJP	81,066	48.72	Dilip Choudhary	INC	46,192	27.76	34,874	20.96
Pali	117	Sojat (SC)	Sanjna Agari	BJP	74,595	54.28	Dr. Sangeeta Arya	INC	53,839	39.17	20,756	15.11
Pali	118	Pali	Gyanchand Parakh	BJP	79,515	52.54	Bheemraj Bhati	INC	65,842	43.50	13,673	9.04
Pali	119	Marwar Junction	Kesaram Choudhary	BJP	69,809	46.60	Khushveer Singh	INC	56,156	37.49	13,653	9.11
Pali	120	Bali	Pushapendra Singh	BJP	92,454	51.32	Ratan Lal Choudhary	INC	72,866	40.45	19,588	10.87
Pali	121	Sumerpur	Madan Rathore	BJP	86,210	56.63	Bina Kak	INC	43,567	28.62	42,643	28.01
Phalodi	122	Phalodi	Pabba Ram	BJP	84,465	59.15	Om Joshi	INC	50,294	35.22	34,171	23.93
Phalodi	123	Lohawat	Gajendra Singh	BJP	83,087	53.50	Malaram	INC	63,273	40.74	19,814	12.76
Jodhpur Rural	124	Shergarh	Babu Singh	BJP	81,297	48.40	Ummedsingh	INC	74,970	44.63	6,327	3.77
Jodhpur Rural	125	Osian	Bhaira Ram Choudhary	BJP	75,363	50.08	Leela Maderana	INC	59,967	39.85	15,396	10.23
Jodhpur Rural	126	Bhopalgarh (SC)	Kamasa	BJP	88,521	57.25	Omprakash	INC	52,711	34.09	35,810	23.16
Jodhpur	127	Sardarpura	Ashok Gehlot	INC	77,835	54.96	Sambhu Singh Khetasar	BJP	59,357	41.91	18,478	13.05
Jodhpur	128	Jodhpur	Kailash Bhanshali	BJP	60,928	51.81	Suparas Bhandari	INC	46,418	39.47	14,510	12.34
Jodhpur	129	Soorsagar	Suryakanta Vyas	BJP	78,589	52.20	Jaiphukhan	INC	57,844	38.42	20,745	13.78
Jodhpur Rural	130	Luni	Jogaram Patel	BJP	96,386	51.51	Amridevi Bishnoi	INC	60,446	32.31	35,940	19.20
Jodhpur Rural	131	Bilara (SC)	Arjunlal	BJP	94,743	59.46	Heeraram	INC	58,802	36.91	35,941	22.55
Jaisalmer	132	Jaisalmer	Chhotu Singh	BJP	78,790	48.74	Rooparam	INC	75,923	46.96	2,867	1.78
Jaisalmer	133	Pokaran	Shaitan Singh	BJP	85,010	59.40	Saleh Mohammd	INC	50,566	35.33	34,444	24.07
Barmer	134	Sheo	Manvendra Singh	BJP	1,00,934	55.90	Ameen Khan	INC	69,509	38.50	31,425	17.40
Barmer	135	Barmer	Mewaram Jain	INC	63,955	40.33	Priyanka Chowdhary	BJP	58,042	36.60	5,913	3.73
Balotra	136	Baytoo	Kailash Choudhary	BJP	73,097	50.59	Colonel Sona Ram	INC	59,123	40.92	13,974	9.67
Balotra	137	Pachpadra	Amra Ram	BJP	77,476	54.36	Madan Prajapat	INC	54,239	38.06	23,237	16.30
Balotra	138	Siwana	Hameersingh Bhayal	BJP	69,014	48.56	Mahant Nirmaldas	INC	48,313	34.00	20,701	14.56
Barmer	139	Gudamalani	Ladu Ram	BJP	91,619	55.75	Hema Ram Choudhary	INC	58,464	35.57	33,155	20.18
Barmer	140	Chohtan (SC)	Tarun Rai Kaga	BJP	88,647	50.70	Padmaram	INC	65,121	37.24	23,526	13.46
Jalore	141	Ahore	Shankar Singh Rajpurohit	BJP	57,808	42.35	Savaram Patel	INC	48,656	35.64	9,152	6.71
Jalore	142	Jalore (SC)	Amrita Meghwal	BJP	84,060	60.55	Ramlal Meghwal	INC	37,260	26.84	46,800	33.71
Jalore	143	Bhinmal	Poora Ram Choudhary	BJP	93,141	57.05	Um Singh	INC	52,950	32.43	40,191	24.62
Sanchore	144	Sanchore	Sukhram Vishnoi	INC	1,03,663	52.48	Jeeva Ram	BJP	79,608	40.30	24,055	12.18
Sanchore	145	Raniwara	Narayan Singh Dewal	BJP	94,234	55.52	Ratan	INC	61,582	36.28	32,652	19.24
Sirohi	146	Sirohi	Ota Ram	BJP	82,098	52.54	Sanyam Lodha	INC	57,659	36.90	24,439	15.64
Sirohi	147	Pindwara Abu (ST)	Samaram Grasiya	BJP	61,453	48.73	Gangaben Girasia	INC	30,598	24.27	30,855	24.46
Sirohi	148	Reodar	Jagasi Ram	BJP	78,818	51.46	Lakhma Ram	INC	46,574	30.41	32,244	21.05
Udaipur	149	Gogunda (ST)	Pratap Lal Bheel	BJP	69,210	45.49	Mangi Lal Garasiya	INC	65,865	43.29	3,345	2.20
Udaipur	150	Jhadol (ST)	Heeralal Darangi	INC	67,354	42.13	Babu Lal Kharadi	BJP	62,670	39.20	4,684	2.93
Udaipur	151	Kherwara (ST)	Nana Lal Ahari	BJP	84,845	49.30	Dayaram Parmar	INC	73,679	42.81	11,166	6.49
Udaipur	152	Udaipur Rural (ST)	Phool Singh Meena	BJP	78,561	50.50	Sajjan Katara	INC	64,797	41.66	13,764	8.84
Udaipur	153	Udaipur	Gulab Chand Kataria	BJP	78,446	56.20	Dinesh Shrimali	INC	53,838	38.57	24,608	17.63
Udaipur	154	Mavli	Dali Chand Dangi	BJP	84,558	52.80	Pushkar Lal Dangi	INC	61,093	38.14	23,465	14.66
Udaipur	155	Vallabhnagar	Randhir Singh Bhinder	IND	74,899	42.98	Gajendra Singh Shaktawat	INC	61,732	35.42	13,167	7.56
Salumbar	156	Salumber (ST)	Amrit Lal	BJP	91,930	56.36	Basanti	INC	55,279	33.89	36,651	22.47
Pratapgarh	157	Dhariawad (ST)	Gotam Lal	BJP	65,954	38.48	Nagraj	INC	58,780	34.30	7,174	4.18
Dungarpur	158	Dungarpur (ST)	Devendra Katara	BJP	58,531	41.78	Lalshankar Ghatiya	INC	54,686	39.04	3,845	2.74
Dungarpur	159	Aspur (ST)	Gopi Chand Meena	BJP	69,236	48.16	Raiya Meena	INC	58,732	40.86	10,504	7.30
Dungarpur	160	Sagwara (ST)	Anita Katara	BJP	69,065	45.74	Surendra Kumar	INC	68,425	45.31	640	0.43
Dungarpur	161	Chorasi (ST)	Sushil Katara	BJP	72,247	50.17	Mahendra Kumar Barjod	INC	51,934	36.07	20,313	14.10
Banswara	162	Ghatol (ST)	Navanit Lal	BJP	93,442	52.25	Nanalal Ninama	INC	66,244	37.04	27,198	15.21
Banswara	163	Garhi (ST)	Jeetmal Khant	BJP	91,929	52.09	Kanta Bheel	INC	67,479	38.24	24,450	13.85
Banswara	164	Banswara (ST)	Dhan Singh Rawat	BJP	86,620	48.68	Arjun Singh Bamaniya	INC	56,559	31.79	30,061	16.89
Banswara	165	Bagidora (ST)	Mahendrajeet Malviya	INC	81,016	49.42	Khemraj Garasiya	BJP	66,691	40.68	14,325	8.74
Banswara	166	Kushalgarh (ST)	Bhima Bhai	BJP	63,979	40.93	Hurting Khadiya	INC	63,271	40.48	708	0.45
Chittorgarh	167	Kapasan (SC)	Arjun Lal Jeengar	BJP	96,190	54.27	R.d. Jawa	INC	65,944	37.20	30,246	17.07
Chittorgarh	168	Begun	Suresh Dhaker	BJP	84,676	44.51	Rajendra Singh Bidhuri	INC	63,378	33.31	21,298	11.20
Chittorgarh	169	Chittorgarh	Chandrabhan Singh	BJP	85,391	49.45	Surendra Singh	INC	73,541	42.59	11,850	6.86
Chittorgarh	170	Nimbahera	Shrichand Kriplani	BJP	88,833	45.09	Anjana Udailal	INC	85,463	43.38	3,370	1.71
Chittorgarh	171	Bari Sadri	Gautam Kumar	BJP	90,161	50.50	Prakash Chand Chaudhary	INC	72,900	40.83	17,261	9.67
Pratapgarh	172	Pratapgarh (ST)	Nandlal Meena	BJP	82,452	49.21	Veluram Meena	INC	50,514	30.15	31,938	19.06
Rajsamand	173	Bhim	Hari Singh Rawat	BJP	62,550	48.70	Lakshman Rawat	IND	44,099	34.34	18,451	14.36
Rajsamand	174	Kumbhalgarh	Surendra Singh Rathore	BJP	73,402	56.03	Ganesh Singh Parmar	INC	45,796	34.96	27,606	21.07
Rajsamand	175	Rajsamand	Kiran Maheshwari	BJP	84,263	58.30	Hari Singh Rathor	INC	53,688	37.14	30,575	21.16
Rajsamand	176	Nathdwara	Kalyansingh Chouhan	BJP	81,450	50.68	Devkinandan Gurjar	INC	68,978	42.92	12,472	7.76
Bhilwara	177	Asind	Ram Lal Gurjar	BJP	73,774	41.14	Ram Lal Jat	INC	46,465	25.91	27,309	15.23
Bhilwara	178	Mandal	Kalu Lal Gujar	BJP	91,813	56.72	Ram Pal Sharma	INC	50,379	31.12	41,434	25.60
Bhilwara	179	Sahara	Balu Ram Chaudhary	BJP	82,470	51.32	Kailash Trivedi	INC	61,714	38.40	20,756	12.92
Bhilwara	180	Bhilwara	Vitthal Shankar Avasthi	BJP	91,582	64.76	Rampal Soni	INC	45,466	32.15	46,116	32.61
Bhilwara	183	Mandalgarh	Kirtikumari	BJP	83,084	50.07	Vivek Dhakar	INC	64,544	38.90	18,540	11.17
Shahpura	181	Shahpura (SC)	Kailash Chandra Meghwal	BJP	93,953	60.75	Rajkumar Bairwa	INC	50,287	32.51	43,666	28.24
Shahpura	182	Jahazpur	Dhiraj Gurjar	INC	75,753	46.10	Shivjiram Meena	BJP	71,491	43.51	4,262	2.59
Bundi	184	Hindoli	Ashok	INC	77,463	46.39	Mahipat Singh	BJP	59,010	35.34	18,453	11.05
Bundi	185	Keshoraipatan (SC)	Baboo Lal Verma	BJP	63,293	38.48	Chunni Lal	INC	50,562	30.74	12,731	7.74
Bundi	186	Bundi	Ashok Dogra	BJP	91,142	49.80	Mamta Sharma	INC	63,506	34.70	27,636	15.10
Kota	187	Pipalda	Vidhyashankar Nandwana	BJP	47,089	36.85	Ramgopal Bairawa	NPP	39,340	30.79	7,749	6.06
Kota	188	Sangod	Heeralal Nagar	BJP	70,495	53.56	Bharat Singh Kundanpur	INC	51,263	38.95	19,232	14.61
Kota	189	Kota North	Prahlad Gunjal	BJP	79,295	48.21	Shanti Kumar Dhariwal	INC	64,434	39.18	14,861	9.03
Kota	190	Kota South	Om Birla	BJP	1,03,369	63.00	Pankaj Mehta	INC	53,930	32.87	49,439	30.13
Kota	191	Ladpura	Bhawani Singh Rajawat	BJP	83,396	50.65	Naimuddin	INC	67,190	40.81	16,206	9.84
Kota	192	Ramganj Mandi (SC)	Chandrakanta Meghwal	BJP	81,351	59.16	Babulal	INC	44,432	32.31	36,919	26.85
Baran	193	Anta	Prabhu Lal Saini	BJP	69,960	48.84	Pramod Bhaya	INC	66,561	46.47	3,399	2.37
Baran	194	Kishanganj (ST)	Lalit Kumar	BJP	64,442	46.08	Chatri Bai	INC	51,460	36.80	12,982	9.28
Baran	195	Baran-Atru (SC)	Rampal	BJP	77,087	52.72	Panachand Meghwal	INC	56,487	38.63	20,600	14.09
Baran	196	Chhabra	Pratap Singh	BJP	88,193	56.58	Mansingh Dhanoriya	NPP	26,808	17.20	61,385	39.38
Jhalawar	197	Dag (SC)	Ramchandra	BJP	1,03,113	60.62	Madanlal	INC	52,716	30.99	50,397	29.63
Jhalawar	198	Jhalrapatan	Vasundhra Raje	BJP	1,14,384	63.14	Meenakshi Chandrawat	INC	53,488	29.53	60,896	33.61
Jhalawar	199	Khanpur	Narendra Nagar	BJP	73,955	45.75	Sanjay Gurjar	INC	42,999	26.60	30,956	19.15
Jhalawar	200	Manohar Thana	Kanwar Lal	BJP	83,846	48.72	Kailash Chand	INC	49,180	28.58	34,666	20.14

== Bypolls (2013-2018) ==
S.No	Date	Constituency	MLA before election	Party before election	Elected MLA	Party after election
102	13 September 2014	Nasirabad	Sanwar Lal Jat	Bharatiya Janata Party	Ramnaryan	Indian National Congress
26	13 September 2014	Surajgarh	Santosh Ahlawat	Bharatiya Janata Party	Sharwan Kumar	Indian National Congress
75	13 September 2014	Weir	Bahadur Singh Koli	Bharatiya Janata Party	Bhajan Lal Jatav	Indian National Congress
190	13 September 2014	Kota South	Om Birla	Bharatiya Janata Party	Sandeep Sharma	Bharatiya Janata Party
79	9 April 2017	Dholpur	B.L. Kushwah	Bahujan Samaj Party	Shobha Rani Kushwah	Bharatiya Janata Party
183	29 January 2018	Mandalgarh	Kirti Kumari	Bharatiya Janata Party	Vivek Dhakar	Indian National Congress

== See also ==
- 2013 elections in India
