= 2018 Rajasthan Legislative Assembly election =

Election in Indian state

- 7 December 2018

200 seats in the Rajasthan Legislative Assembly 101 seats needed for a majority
- Turnout: 74.72% (▼0.95 pp)
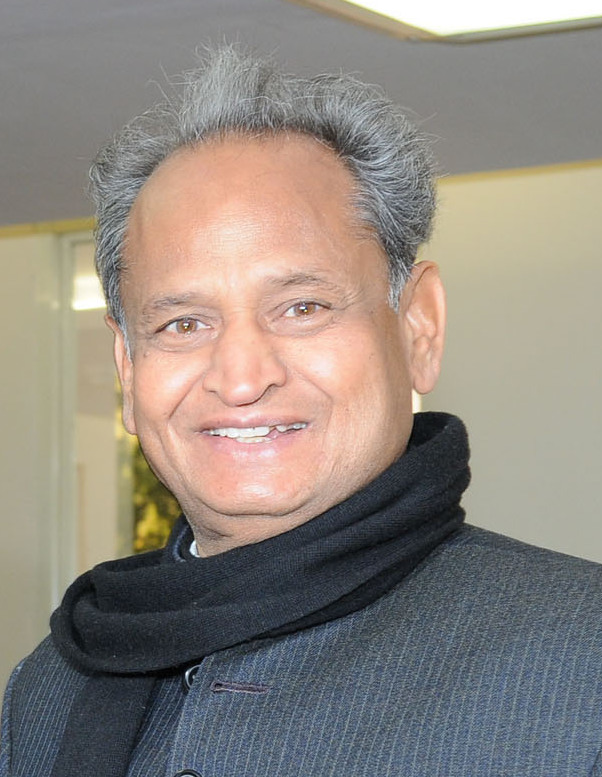

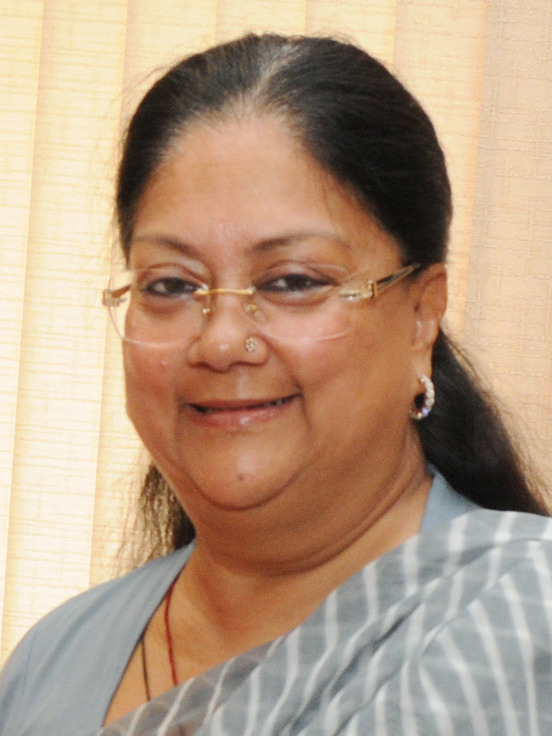
	First party	Second party
Leader	Ashok Gehlot	Vasundhara Raje
Party	INC	BJP
Alliance	UPA	NDA
Leader since	1998	2003
Leader's seat	Sardarpura (won)	Jhalrapatan (won)
Last election	21	163
Seats after	100	73
Seat change	▲79	▼90
Popular vote	13,935,201	13,757,502
Percentage	39.30%	38.08%
Swing	▲6.23 pp	▼6.37 pp
- Seatwise map of the election results

- Structure of the Rajasthan Legislative Assembly after the election
Chief Minister before election
Vasundhara Raje
BJP
Elected Chief Minister
Ashok Gehlot
INC

Legislative Assembly elections were held in the Indian state of Rajasthan on 7 December 2018. The Indian National Congress became the single largest party with 100 seats, short of the majority by 1 seat. The Bharatiya Janata Party won 73 seats, much lower compared to the previous election, in which it won an absolute majority of 163 seats. The Indian National Congress formed the government with the Bahujan Samaj Party.

== Background ==
The tenure of the Rajasthan Assembly ended on 20 January 2019. A team of Consultants like Amar Jadhav, Jinda Sandbhor and Manas Pagar who managed the Social media, Data analysis and EVM training for Congress. The main political contenders are the BJP, INC, BSP and the RLP. Most of the by-elections preceding the election were won by the Indian National Congress. There was a lot of anti-incumbency and infighting in the BJP government, which eventually led to a Congress victory.

== Schedule ==
The date of the election was 7 December 2018, and the result was announced on 11 December 2018.

Event	Date	Day
Date for Nominations	12 Nov 2018	Monday
Last Date for filing Nominations	19 Nov 2018	Monday
Date for scrutiny of nominations	20 Nov 2018	Tuesday
Last date for withdrawal of candidatures	22 Nov 2018	Thursday
Date of poll	7 Dec 2018	Friday
Date of counting	11 Dec 2018	Tuesday
Date before which the election shall be completed	13 Dec 2018	Thursday

== Parties and Alliances ==
Alliance/Party		Flag	Symbol	Leader	Seats contested	
UPA	Indian National Congress			Ashok Gehlot	194	200
UPA	Rashtriya Lok Dal			Chudhary Ajit Singh	2	200
UPA	Nationalist Congress Party			Sharad Pawar	1	200
UPA	Independents				3	200
NDA	Bharatiya Janata Party			Vasundhara Raje Scindia	199	200
NDA	Independent				1	200
Bahujan Samaj Party				Mayawati	189	
Rashtriya Loktantrik Party				Hanuman Beniwal	58	
Communist Party of India (Marxist)				Sitaram Yechuri	28	
Bharatiya Tribal Party				Rajkumar Roat	11	

== Opinion polls ==
Date	Polling agency	BJP	INC	Others	Lead
9 November 2018	ABP News- C voter	58	135	6	77
8 November 2018	Graphnile	71	119	10	38
2 November 2018	ABP News- C voter	55	145	5	90
1 November 2018	India TV - CNX	75	115	10	40
30 October 2018	Spick Media	78	118	4	40
8 October 2018	Times Now - Chrome DM	89	102	9	13
9 October 2018	Times Now - Warroom Strategies	75	115	10	40
10 October 2018	News Nation	73	115	12	42
6 October 2018	ABP News -C Voter	56	142	2	86
14 August 2018	ABP News- C Voter	57	130	13	73
Average as on 09 November 2018		69	123	8	54

== Exit polls ==
The exit polls gave a clear edge to the Indian National Congress.

Polling agency	BJP	INC	BSP	Others	Source
CVoter - Republic TV	60	137	NA	3	
CNX - Times Now	85	105	NA	9	
India TV	80–90	100-110	1-3	6-8	
CSDS - ABP	83	101	NA	15	
Axis My India - India Today and Aaj Tak	55–72	119-141	0	4-11	
Republic Jan Ki Baat	93	91	NA	15	
Today's Chanakya	68	123	NA	8	

== Results ==
Vote Share by party (Rajasthan Assembly Election, 2018)
1. INC (39.3%)
2. BJP (38.8%)
3. Independents (9.50%)
4. BSP (4.03%)
5. RLP (2.40%)
6. CPI(M) (1.20%)
7. Other (4.80%)
Seat Share
1. INC 100 (50.0%)
2. BJP 93 (46.5%)
3. Independent 4 (2.00%)
4. BSP 3 (1.50%)

Seats and vote-share as follows.

Parties and coalitions	Popular vote			Seats	
Parties and coalitions	Votes	%	±pp	Won	+/−
Indian National Congress	13,935,201	39.30%	▲6.23	100	▲79
Bharatiya Janata Party	13,757,502	38.77%	▼6.40	93	▼70
Independents	3,372,206	9.5%	▲1.29	4	▼6
Bahujan Samaj Party	1,410,995	4.03%	▲0.63	3	▼3
Rashtriya Loktantrik Party	856,038	2.4%	New	0	▲0
Communist Party of India (Marxist)	434,210	1.2%	▲0.33	0	▲0
Bharatiya Tribal Party	255,100	0.7%	New	0	▲0
Rashtriya Lok Dal	116,320	0.3%	▲0.29	0	▲0
Other parties and candidates (OTH)	887,317	2.5%	0.00	0	0
None of the Above	467,781	1.3%			
Total	35,672,912	100.00		200	±0
Valid votes	35,672,912	99.91			
Invalid votes	33,814	0.09			
Votes cast / turnout	35,706,726	74.72			
Abstentions	12,083,240	25.28			
Registered voters	47,789,966				

=== Region Wise Results ===
Region	Seats			
Region	Seats	INC	BJP	OTH
Marwar	46	24	17	5
Bagar	21	9	9	3
Harouti	57	35	10	12
Shekhawati	16	12	2	2
Mewar	60	21	35	4
Total	200	100	73	27

=== District Wise Results ===
District	Seats					
District	Seats	INC	BJP	BSP	IND	OTH
Ganganagar	4	2	1	—N/a	1	—N/a
Anupgarh	3	1	2	—N/a	—N/a	—N/a
Hanumangarh	5	2	2	—N/a	—N/a	1
Bikaner	6	2	3	—N/a	—N/a	1
Churu	6	4	2	—N/a	—N/a	—N/a
Jhunjhunu	7	4	2	1	—N/a	—N/a
Sikar	6	5	—N/a	—N/a	1	—N/a
Neem Ka Thana	2	2	—N/a	—N/a	—N/a	—N/a
Kotputli-Behror	2	2	—N/a	—N/a	—N/a	—N/a
Jaipur	10	5	4	—N/a	1	—N/a
Jaipur Rural	6	3	2	—N/a	1	—N/a
Dudu	1	—N/a	—N/a	—N/a	1	—N/a
Khairthal-Tijara	3	—N/a	1	2	—N/a	—N/a
Alwar	8	5	1	—N/a	2	—N/a
Deeg	3	2	—N/a	1	—N/a	—N/a
Bharatpur	4	2	—N/a	1	—N/a	1
Dholpur	4	3	1	—N/a	—N/a	—N/a
Karauli	4	3	—N/a	1	—N/a	—N/a
Dausa	5	4	—N/a	—N/a	1	—N/a
Gangapur City	2	1	—N/a	—N/a	1	—N/a
Sawai Madhopur	2	2	—N/a	—N/a	—N/a	—N/a
Tonk	4	3	1	—N/a	—N/a	—N/a
Ajmer	5	—N/a	4	—N/a	1	—N/a
Beawar	2	1	1	—N/a	—N/a	—N/a
Kekri	1	1	—N/a	—N/a	—N/a	—N/a
Didwana Kuchaman	5	4	1	—N/a	—N/a	—N/a
Nagaur	5	2	1	—N/a	—N/a	2
Pali	6	—N/a	5	—N/a	1	—N/a
Phalodi	2	1	1	—N/a	—N/a	—N/a
Jodhpur Rural	5	4	—N/a	—N/a	—N/a	1
Jodhpur	3	2	1	—N/a	—N/a	—N/a
Jaisalmer	2	2	—N/a	—N/a	—N/a	—N/a
Barmer	4	4	—N/a	—N/a	—N/a	—N/a
Balotra	3	2	1	—N/a	—N/a	—N/a
Jalore	3	—N/a	3	—N/a	—N/a	—N/a
Sanchore	2	1	1	—N/a	—N/a	—N/a
Sirohi	3	—N/a	2	—N/a	1	—N/a
Udaipur	7	2	5	—N/a	—N/a	—N/a
Salumbar	1	—N/a	1	—N/a	—N/a	—N/a
Pratapgarh	2	1	1	—N/a	—N/a	—N/a
Dungarpur	4	1	1	—N/a	—N/a	2
Banswara	5	2	2	—N/a	1	—N/a
Chittorgarh	5	2	3	—N/a	—N/a	—N/a
Rajsamand	4	2	2	—N/a	—N/a	—N/a
Bhilwara	5	2	3	—N/a	—N/a	—N/a
Shahpura	2	—N/a	2	—N/a	—N/a	—N/a
Bundi	3	1	2	—N/a	—N/a	—N/a
Kota	6	3	3	—N/a	—N/a	—N/a
Baran	4	3	1	—N/a	—N/a	—N/a
Jhalawar	4	—N/a	4	—N/a	—N/a	—N/a
Total	200	100	73	6	13	8

== Detailed Results ==
District	Constituency		Winner				Runner Up				Margin	%
District	#	Name (Note: SC and ST indicate constituencies reserved for Scheduled Castes and Scheduled Tribes respectively.)	Candidate	Party	Votes	%	Candidate	Party	Votes	%	Margin	%
Ganganagar	1	Sadulshahar	Jagdish Chander	INC	73,165	39.59	Gurveer Singh Brar	BJP	63,498	34.36	9,667	5.23
Ganganagar	2	Ganganagar	Raj Kumar Gaur	IND	44,998	26.52	Ashok Chandak	INC	35,818	21.11	9,180	5.41
Ganganagar	3	Karanpur	Gurmeet Singh Kooner	INC	73,896	38.98	Prithipal Singh	IND	45,520	24.01	28,376	14.97
Ganganagar	4	Suratgarh	Rampratap Kasniyan	BJP	69,032	36.11	Hanuman Meel	INC	58,797	30.75	10,235	5.36
Anupgarh	5	Raisinghnagar (SC)	Balveer Singh Luthra	BJP	76,935	37.98	Shyopat Ram	CPM	43,264	21.36	33,671	16.62
Anupgarh	6	Anupgarh (SC)	Santosh	BJP	79,383	43.30	Kuldeep Indora	INC	58,259	31.78	21,124	11.52
Hanumangarh	7	Sangaria	Gurdeep Singh	BJP	99,064	49.37	Shabnam Godara	INC	92,526	46.11	6,538	3.26
Hanumangarh	8	Hanumangarh	Vinod Kumar	INC	1,11,207	49.69	Rampratap	BJP	95,685	42.75	15,522	6.94
Hanumangarh	9	Pilibanga (SC)	Dharmendra Kumar	BJP	1,06,414	47.04	Vinod Kumar	INC	1,06,136	46.92	278	0.12
Hanumangarh	10	Nohar	Amit Chachan	INC	93,851	46.05	Abhishek Matoria	BJP	80,124	39.31	13,727	6.74
Hanumangarh	11	Bhadra	Balwan Poonia	CPM	82,204	40.67	Sanjeev Kumar	BJP	59,051	29.21	23,153	11.46
Anupgarh	12	Khajuwala (SC)	Govind Ram	INC	82,994	54.09	Dr. Vishwanath	BJP	51,905	33.83	31,089	20.26
Bikaner	13	Bikaner West	Bulaki Das Kalla	INC	75,128	47.58	Gopal Krishn	BJP	68,938	43.66	6,190	3.92
Bikaner	14	Bikaner East	Siddhi Kumari	BJP	73,174	47.70	Kanhaiya Lal Jhanwar	INC	66,113	43.10	7,061	4.60
Bikaner	15	Kolayat	Bhanwar Singh Bhati	INC	89,505	49.99	Poonam Kanwar Bhati	BJP	78,489	43.84	11,016	6.15
Bikaner	16	Lunkaransar	Sumit Godara	BJP	72,822	42.12	Virendra Beniwal	INC	61,969	35.84	10,853	6.28
Bikaner	17	Dungargarh	Girdharilal	CPM	72,376	40.50	Mangalaram	INC	48,480	27.13	23,896	13.37
Bikaner	18	Nokha	Biharilal	BJP	86,917	45.30	Rameshwar Dudi	INC	78,254	40.79	8,663	4.51
Churu	19	Sadulpur	Krishna Poonia	INC	70,020	39.45	Manoj Nyangali	BSP	51,936	29.26	18,084	10.19
Churu	20	Taranagar	Narendra Budaniya	INC	56,968	31.95	Rakesh Jangir	BJP	44,413	24.91	12,555	7.04
Churu	21	Sardarshahar	Bhanwarlal Sharma	INC	95,282	46.31	Ashok Kumar	BJP	78,466	38.14	16,816	8.17
Churu	22	Churu	Rajendra Rathore	BJP	87,233	48.28	Rafique Mandelia	INC	85,383	47.25	1,850	1.03
Churu	23	Ratangarh	Abhinesh Maharshi	BJP	71,201	38.56	Poosaram Godara	IND	59,320	32.13	11,881	6.43
Churu	24	Sujangarh (SC)	Bhanwarlal Meghwal	INC	83,632	45.62	Khemaram	BJP	44,883	24.48	38,749	21.14
Jhunjhunu	25	Pilani (SC)	J.P. Chandelia	INC	84,715	52.43	Kailash Chand	BJP	71,176	44.05	13,539	8.38
Jhunjhunu	26	Surajgarh	Subhash Poonia	BJP	79,913	41.26	Sharwan Kumar	INC	76,488	39.49	3,425	1.77
Jhunjhunu	27	Jhunjhunu	Brijendra Singh Ola	INC	76,177	45.02	Rajendra Singh Bhamboo	BJP	35,612	21.05	40,565	23.97
Jhunjhunu	28	Mandawa	Narendra Kumar	BJP	80,599	48.72	Kum. Rita Choudhary	INC	78,253	47.30	2,346	1.42
Jhunjhunu	29	Nawalgarh	Dr. Rajkumar Sharma	INC	79,570	42.69	Ravi Saini	BJP	43,070	23.11	36,500	19.58
Jhunjhunu	30	Udaipurwati	Rajendrasingh Gudha	BSP	59,362	34.15	Shubhkaran Choudhary	BJP	53,828	30.97	5,534	3.18
Jhunjhunu	31	Khetri	Jitendra Singh	INC	57,153	37.32	Dharmpal	BJP	56,196	36.70	957	0.62
Sikar	32	Fatehpur	Hakam Ali Khan	INC	80,354	47.09	Sunita Kumari	BJP	79,494	46.59	860	0.50
Sikar	33	Lachhmangarh	Govind Singh Dotasara	INC	98,227	51.78	Dinesh Joshi	BJP	76,175	40.15	22,052	11.63
Sikar	34	Dhod (SC)	Parasram Mordia	INC	75,142	39.50	Pema Ram	CPM	61,089	32.11	14,053	7.39
Sikar	35	Sikar	Rajendra Pareek	INC	83,472	43.86	Ratanlal Jaldhari	BJP	68,292	35.88	15,180	7.98
Sikar	36	Danta Ramgarh	Virendra Singh	INC	64,931	34.41	Harish Chand Kumawat	BJP	64,011	33.92	920	0.49
Sikar	37	Khandela	Mahadeo Singh	IND	53,864	31.21	Banshidhar Bajiya	BJP	49,516	28.69	4,348	2.52
Neem Ka Thana	38	Neem Ka Thana	Suresh Modi	INC	66,287	37.12	Prem Singh Bajore	BJP	53,672	30.06	12,615	7.06
Neem Ka Thana	39	Srimadhopur	Deependra Singh	INC	90,941	48.97	Jhabar Singh Kharra	BJP	79,131	42.61	11,810	6.36
Kotputli-Behror	40	Kotputli	Rajendra Singh Yadav	INC	57,114	35.77	Mukesh Goyal	BJP	43,238	27.08	13,876	8.69
Kotputli-Behror	41	Viratnagar	Indraj Singh Gurjar	INC	59,427	38.43	Kuldeep Dhankad	IND	40,060	25.91	19,367	12.52
Jaipur	42	Shahpura	Alok Beniwal	IND	66,538	38.24	Manish Yadav	INC	62,683	36.02	3,855	2.22
Jaipur Rural	43	Chomu	Ramlal Sharma	BJP	70,183	37.65	Bhagwan Sahai Saini	INC	68,895	36.96	1,288	0.69
Jaipur Rural	44	Phulera	Nirmal Kumawat	BJP	73,530	40.57	Vidhyadhar Singh	INC	72,398	39.94	1,132	0.63
Dudu	45	Dudu (SC)	Babulal Nagar	IND	68,769	38.75	Dr. Prem Chand Bairwa	BJP	53,990	30.42	14,779	8.33
Jaipur	46	Jhotwara	Lalchand Kataria	INC	1,27,185	48.67	Rajpal Singh Shekhawat	BJP	1,16,438	44.56	10,747	4.11
Jaipur	47	Amber	Satish Poonia	BJP	93,132	46.69	Prashant Sharma	INC	79,856	40.03	13,276	6.66
Jaipur Rural	48	Jamwa Ramgarh (ST)	Gopal Lal Meena	INC	89,165	55.09	Mahendra Pal Meena	BJP	67,481	41.69	21,684	13.40
Jaipur	49	Hawa Mahal	Dr. Mahesh Joshi	INC	85,474	50.38	Surendra Pareek	BJP	76,192	44.91	9,282	5.47
Jaipur	50	Vidhyadhar Nagar	Narpat Singh Rajvi	BJP	95,599	42.33	Sitaram Agarwal	INC	64,367	28.50	31,232	13.83
Jaipur	51	Civil Lines	Pratap Singh Khachariyawas	INC	87,937	53.53	Arun Chaturvedi	BJP	69,859	42.53	18,078	11.00
Jaipur	52	Kishanpole	Amin Kagzi	INC	71,189	49.95	Mohan Lal Gupta	BJP	62,419	43.80	8,770	6.15
Jaipur	53	Adarsh Nagar	Rafeek Khan	INC	88,541	50.78	Ashok Parnami	BJP	75,988	43.58	12,553	7.20
Jaipur	54	Malviya Nagar	Kalicharan Saraf	BJP	70,221	48.17	Dr. Archana Sharma	INC	68,517	47.00	1,704	1.17
Jaipur	55	Sanganer	Ashok Lahoty	BJP	1,07,947	51.51	Pushpendra Bhardwaj	INC	72,542	34.61	35,405	16.90
Jaipur Rural	56	Bagru (SC)	Ganga Devi	INC	96,635	44.77	Kailash Chand Verma	BJP	91,292	42.30	5,343	2.47
Jaipur Rural	57	Bassi (ST)	Laxman Meena	IND	79,878	47.33	Kanhaiyalal	BJP	37,114	21.99	42,764	25.34
Jaipur Rural	58	Chaksu (SC)	Ved Prakash Solanki	INC	70,007	44.06	Ramavatar Bairwa	BJP	66,576	41.90	3,431	2.16
Khairthal-Tijara	59	Tijara	Sandeep Kumar	BSP	59,468	32.40	Aimaduddin Ahmad Khan	INC	55,011	29.97	4,457	2.43
Khairthal-Tijara	60	Kishangarh Bas	Deepchand	BSP	73,799	41.12	Ramhet Singh Yadav	BJP	63,883	35.59	9,916	5.53
Khairthal-Tijara	61	Mundawar	Manjeet Dharampal	BJP	73,191	45.48	Lalit Yadav	BSP	55,589	34.54	17,602	10.94
Alwar	62	Behror	Baljeet Yadav	IND	55,160	34.27	Ramchandra Yadav	INC	51,324	31.89	3,836	2.38
Alwar	63	Bansur	Shakuntala Rawat	INC	65,656	38.98	Devi Singh Shekhawat	IND	47,736	28.34	17,920	10.64
Alwar	64	Thanagazi	Kanti Prasad	IND	64,079	41.09	Hem Singh	IND	34,729	22.27	29,350	18.82
Alwar	65	Alwar Rural (SC)	Tika Ram Jully	INC	85,752	49.14	Master Ramkishan	BJP	59,275	33.97	26,477	15.17
Alwar	66	Alwar Urban	Sanjay Sharma	BJP	85,041	50.91	Shweta Saini	INC	63,033	37.73	22,008	13.18
Alwar	67	Ramgarh	Shafia Zubair	INC	83,311	44.81	Sukhwant Singh	BJP	71,083	38.23	12,228	6.58
Alwar	68	Rajgarh Laxmangarh (ST)	Johari Lal Meena	INC	82,876	48.57	Vijay Samarth Lal	BJP	52,578	30.81	30,298	17.76
Alwar	69	Kathumar (SC)	Babulal	INC	54,110	37.16	Babulal Manager	BJP	39,942	27.43	14,168	9.73
Deeg	70	Kaman	Zahida Khan	INC	1,10,789	58.04	Jawahar Singh Beadham	BJP	71,168	37.28	39,621	20.76
Deeg	71	Nagar	Wajib Ali	BSP	62,644	36.60	Nem Singh	SP	37,177	21.72	25,467	14.88
Deeg	72	Deeg-Kumher	Vishvendra Singh	INC	73,730	45.41	Dr. Shailesh Singh	BJP	65,512	40.35	8,218	5.06
Bharatpur	73	Bharatpur	Dr. Subhash Garg	RLD	52,869	30.43	Vijay Bansal	BJP	37,159	21.39	15,710	9.04
Bharatpur	74	Nadbai	Joginder Singh Awana	BSP	50,976	28.17	Krishnendra Kaur	BJP	46,882	25.90	4,094	2.27
Bharatpur	75	Weir (SC)	Bhajan Lal Jatav	INC	78,716	47.08	Ramswaroop Koli	BJP	63,433	37.94	15,283	9.14
Bharatpur	76	Bayana (SC)	Amar Singh	INC	86,962	50.30	Dr. Ritu Banawat	BJP	80,267	46.43	6,695	3.87
Dholpur	77	Baseri (SC)	Khiladi Lal Bairwa	INC	54,297	45.04	Chhitriya Lal Jatav	BJP	36,741	30.48	17,556	14.56
Dholpur	78	Bari	Girraj Singh	INC	79,712	43.88	Jasvant Singh	BJP	60,029	33.04	19,683	10.84
Dholpur	79	Dholpur	Shobharani Kushwah	BJP	67,349	45.79	Shiv Charan Kushawah	INC	47,989	32.63	19,360	13.16
Dholpur	80	Rajakhera	Rohit Bohra	INC	76,278	53.11	Ashok Sharma	BJP	61,287	42.67	14,991	10.44
Karauli	81	Todabhim (ST)	Prithviraj	INC	1,07,691	65.51	Ramesh Chand	BJP	34,385	20.92	73,306	44.59
Karauli	82	Hindaun (SC)	Bharosi Lal	INC	1,04,694	56.29	Manju Khairwal	BJP	77,914	41.89	26,780	14.40
Karauli	83	Karauli	Lakhan Singh	BSP	61,163	35.75	Darshan Singh	INC	51,601	30.16	9,562	5.59
Karauli	84	Sapotra (ST)	Ramesh Chand Meena	INC	76,399	44.74	Golma	BJP	62,295	36.48	14,104	8.26
Dausa	85	Bandikui	Gajraj Khatana	INC	56,433	35.36	Ram Kishor Saini	BJP	51,669	32.37	4,764	2.99
Dausa	86	Mahuwa	Om Prakash Hudla	IND	51,310	34.84	Rajendra	BJP	41,325	28.06	9,985	6.78
Dausa	87	Sikrai (SC)	Mamta Bhupesh	INC	96,454	57.04	Vikram Bansiwal	BJP	62,671	37.06	33,783	19.98
Dausa	88	Dausa	Murari Lal	INC	99,004	57.48	Shankar Lal Sharma	BJP	48,056	27.90	50,948	29.58
Dausa	89	Lalsot (ST)	Parsadi Lal	INC	88,828	51.20	Rambilas	BJP	79,754	45.97	9,074	5.23
Gangapur City	90	Gangapur	Ramkesh	IND	58,744	36.88	Mansingh Gurjar	BJP	48,678	30.56	10,066	6.32
Gangapur City	91	Bamanwas (ST)	Indra	INC	73,656	52.12	Nawal Kishore Meena	IND	35,143	24.87	38,513	27.25
Sawai Madhopur	92	Sawai Madhopur	Danish Abrar	INC	85,655	52.36	Asha Meena	BJP	60,456	36.96	25,199	15.40
Sawai Madhopur	93	Khandar (SC)	Ashok	INC	89,028	56.37	Jitendra Kumar Gothwal	BJP	61,079	38.67	27,949	17.70
Tonk	94	Malpura	Kanhiya Lal	BJP	93,237	52.10	Ranveer Phalwan	RLD	63,451	35.45	29,786	16.65
Tonk	95	Niwai (SC)	Prashant Bairwa	INC	1,05,784	60.82	Ram Sahay Verma	BJP	61,895	35.59	43,889	25.23
Tonk	96	Tonk	Sachin Pilot	INC	1,09,040	63.56	Yoonus Khan	BJP	54,861	31.98	54,179	31.58
Tonk	97	Deoli-Uniara	Harish Chandra Meena	INC	95,540	50.79	Rajendra Gurjar	BJP	74,064	39.37	21,476	11.42
Ajmer	98	Kishangarh	Suresh Tak	IND	82,678	42.16	Vikash Choudhary	BJP	65,226	33.26	17,452	8.90
Ajmer	99	Pushkar	Suresh Singh Rawat	BJP	84,860	49.07	Nasim Akhtar Insaf	INC	75,471	43.64	9,389	5.43
Ajmer	100	Ajmer North	Vasudev Devnani	BJP	67,881	51.06	Mahendra Singh Ralawata	INC	59,251	44.57	8,630	6.49
Ajmer	101	Ajmer South (SC)	Anita Bhadel	BJP	69,064	50.16	Hemant Bhati	INC	63,364	46.02	5,700	4.14
Ajmer	102	Nasirabad	Ramswaroop Lamba	BJP	89,409	52.70	Ramnarain	INC	72,725	42.87	16,684	9.83
Beawar	103	Beawar	Shankar Singh Rawat	BJP	69,932	42.49	Parasmal Jain	INC	65,430	39.75	4,502	2.74
Beawar	104	Masuda	Rakesh Pareek	INC	86,008	46.52	Sushil Kanwar	BJP	82,634	44.69	3,374	1.83
Kekri	105	Kekri	Raghu Sharma	INC	95,795	53.24	Rajendra Vinayaka	BJP	76,334	42.42	19,461	10.82
Didwana Kuchaman	106	Ladnun	Mukesh Kumar Bhakar	INC	65,041	39.30	Manohar Singh	BJP	52,094	31.48	12,947	7.82
Didwana Kuchaman	107	Deedwana	Chetan Singh Choudhary	INC	92,981	56.01	Jitendra Singh	BJP	52,379	31.55	40,602	24.46
Nagaur	108	Jayal (SC)	Manju Devi	INC	68,415	42.17	Anil	RLP	49,811	30.70	18,604	11.47
Nagaur	109	Nagaur	Mohan Ram Choudhary	BJP	86,315	49.02	Habibur Rehman Lamba	INC	73,307	41.63	13,008	7.39
Nagaur	110	Khinwsar	Hanuman Beniwal	RLP	83,096	44.65	Savai Singh Chaudhary	INC	66,148	35.54	16,948	9.11
Nagaur	111	Merta (SC)	Indira Devi	RLP	57,662	32.02	Laxman Ram Meghwal	IND	44,827	24.89	12,835	7.13
Nagaur	112	Degana	Vijaypal Mirdha	INC	75,362	43.52	Ajay Singh Kilak	BJP	53,824	31.09	21,538	12.43
Didwana Kuchaman	113	Makrana	Roopa Ram	BJP	87,201	46.90	Jakir Hussain Gesawat	INC	85,713	46.10	1,488	0.80
Didwana Kuchaman	114	Parbatsar	Ramniwas Gawriya	INC	76,373	44.76	Man Singh Kinsariya	BJP	61,888	36.27	14,485	8.49
Didwana Kuchaman	115	Nawan	Mahendra Choudhary	INC	72,168	41.06	Vijay Singh	BJP	69,912	39.77	2,256	1.29
Pali	116	Jaitaran	Avinash	BJP	65,607	33.60	Dilip Choudhary	INC	53,419	27.36	12,188	6.24
Pali	117	Sojat	Shobha Chauhan	BJP	80,645	54.24	Shobha Solanki	INC	48,247	32.45	32,398	21.79
Pali	118	Pali	Gyanchand Parakh	BJP	75,480	43.80	Bheemraj Bhati	IND	56,094	32.55	19,386	11.25
Pali	119	Marwar Junction	Khushveer Singh	IND	58,921	35.81	Kesaram Choudhary	BJP	58,670	35.66	251	0.15
Pali	120	Bali	Pushpendra Singh	BJP	96,238	49.00	Ummed Singh	NCP	68,051	34.65	28,187	14.35
Pali	121	Sumerpur	Joraram Kumawat	BJP	96,617	55.57	Ranju Ramawat	INC	63,685	36.63	32,932	18.94
Phalodi	122	Phalodi	Pabba Ram	BJP	60,735	34.69	Mahesh Kumar	INC	51,998	29.70	8,737	4.99
Phalodi	123	Lohawat	Kisana Ram Vishnoi	INC	1,06,084	57.74	Gajendra Singh	BJP	65,208	35.49	40,876	22.25
Jodhpur Rural	124	Shergarh	Meena Kanwar	INC	99,916	50.64	Babu Singh Rathore	BJP	75,220	38.12	24,696	12.52
Jodhpur Rural	125	Osian	Divya Maderna	INC	83,629	45.29	Bhera Ram Choudhary	BJP	56,039	30.35	27,590	14.94
Jodhpur Rural	126	Bhopalgarh (SC)	Pukhraj	RLP	68,386	35.72	Bhanwarlal Balai	INC	63,424	33.13	4,962	2.59
Jodhpur	127	Sardarpura	Ashok Gehlot	INC	97,081	63.31	Shambhu Singh Khetasar	BJP	51,484	33.57	45,597	29.74
Jodhpur	128	Jodhpur	Manisha Panwar	INC	64,172	50.30	Atul Bhansali	BJP	58,323	45.71	5,849	4.59
Jodhpur	129	Soorsagar	Suryakanta Vyas	BJP	86,885	48.92	Ayyub Khan	INC	81,122	45.68	5,763	3.24
Jodhpur Rural	130	Luni	Mahendra Vishnoi	INC	84,979	38.10	Jogaram Patel	BJP	75,822	33.99	9,157	4.11
Jodhpur Rural	131	Bilara (SC)	Heeraram	INC	75,671	40.88	Arjun Lal	BJP	66,053	35.68	9,618	5.20
Jaisalmer	132	Jaisalmer	Rooparam	INC	1,06,531	56.76	Sangsingh Bhati	BJP	76,753	40.89	29,778	15.87
Jaisalmer	133	Pokaran	Shale Mohammad	INC	82,964	48.22	Pratappuri	BJP	82,092	47.71	872	0.51
Barmer	134	Sheo	Ameen Khan	INC	84,338	41.25	Khangar Singh Sodha	BJP	60,784	29.73	23,554	11.52
Barmer	135	Barmer	Mewaram Jain	INC	97,874	51.95	Sonaram Choudhary	BJP	64,827	34.41	33,047	17.54
Balotra	136	Baytoo	Harish Choudhary	INC	57,703	31.94	Ummeda Ram	RLP	43,900	24.30	13,803	7.64
Balotra	137	Pachpadra	Madan Prajapat	INC	69,393	42.81	Amara Ram	BJP	66,998	41.33	2,395	1.48
Balotra	138	Siwana	Hameer Singh Bhayal	BJP	50,657	31.73	Balaram	IND	49,700	31.13	957	0.60
Barmer	139	Gudha Malani	Hemaram Choudhary	INC	93,433	48.92	Ladu Ram	BJP	79,869	41.82	13,564	7.10
Barmer	140	Chohtan (SC)	Padmaram	INC	83,601	41.57	Adu Ram Meghwal	BJP	79,339	39.45	4,262	2.12
Jalore	141	Ahore	Chhagansingh	BJP	74,928	49.25	Savaram Patel	INC	43,880	28.84	31,048	20.41
Jalore	142	Jalore (SC)	Jogeshwar Garg	BJP	95,086	58.30	Manju Meghwal	INC	59,852	36.70	35,234	21.60
Jalore	143	Bhinmal	Pooraram Choudhary	BJP	78,893	43.14	Samarjit Singh	INC	69,247	37.86	9,646	5.28
Sanchore	144	Sanchore	Sukhram Vishnoi	INC	84,689	37.19	Dana Ram Choudhary	BJP	58,771	25.81	25,918	11.38
Sanchore	145	Raniwara	Narayan Singh Dewal	BJP	88,887	47.85	Ratan Devasi	INC	85,482	46.02	3,405	1.83
Sirohi	146	Sirohi	Sanyam Lodha	IND	81,272	45.53	Otaram Devasi	BJP	71,019	39.79	10,253	5.74
Sirohi	147	Pindwara-Abu (ST)	Sama Ram Grasiya	BJP	69,360	49.70	Lala Ram	INC	42,386	30.37	26,974	19.33
Sirohi	148	Reodar (SC)	Jagasi Ram	BJP	87,861	49.69	Neeraj Dangi	INC	73,257	41.43	14,604	8.26
Udaipur	149	Gogunda (ST)	Pratap Lal Bheel (Gameti)	BJP	82,599	45.62	Dr. Mangi Lal Garasiya	INC	78,186	43.19	4,413	2.43
Udaipur	150	Jhadol (ST)	Babu Lal	BJP	87,527	44.52	Sunil Kumar Bhajat	INC	74,580	37.93	12,947	6.59
Udaipur	151	Kherwara (ST)	Dayaram Parmar	INC	93,155	48.45	Nanalal Ahari	BJP	68,164	35.45	24,991	13.00
Udaipur	152	Udaipur Rural (ST)	Phool Singh Meena	BJP	97,382	51.37	Vivek Katara	INC	78,675	41.50	18,707	9.87
Udaipur	153	Udaipur	Gulab Chand Kataria	BJP	74,808	47.06	Girija Vyas	INC	65,484	41.19	9,324	5.87
Udaipur	154	Mavli	Dharmnarayan Joshi	BJP	99,723	53.61	Pushkar Lal Dangi	INC	72,745	39.11	26,978	14.50
Udaipur	155	Vallabhnagar	Gajendra Shaktawat	INC	66,306	35.26	Randhir Bhinder	JSR (Note: Janta Sena Rajasthan)	62,587	33.28	3,719	1.98
Salumbar	156	Salumber (ST)	Amrit Lal Meena	BJP	87,472	47.48	Raguvir Singh	INC	65,554	35.58	21,918	11.90
Pratapgarh	157	Dhariawad (ST)	Gotam Lal	BJP	96,457	49.65	Nagraj	INC	72,615	37.38	23,842	12.27
Dungarpur	158	Dungarpur (ST)	Ganesh Ghogra	INC	75,482	46.34	Madhavlal Varahat	BJP	47,584	29.21	27,898	17.13
Dungarpur	159	Aspur (ST)	Gopichand Meena	BJP	57,062	35.12	Umesh	BTP	51,732	31.84	5,330	3.28
Dungarpur	160	Sagwara (ST)	Ramprasad	BTP	58,406	33.59	Shankarlal	BJP	53,824	30.95	4,582	2.64
Dungarpur	161	Chorasi (ST)	Rajkumar Roat	BTP	64,119	38.22	Sushil Katara	BJP	51,185	30.51	12,934	7.71
Banswara	162	Ghatol (ST)	Harendra Ninama	BJP	1,01,121	46.33	Nanalal Ninama	INC	96,672	44.29	4,449	2.04
Banswara	163	Garhi (ST)	Kailash Chandra Meena	BJP	99,350	48.28	Kanta Bhil	INC	74,949	36.42	24,401	11.86
Banswara	164	Banswara (ST)	Arjun Singh Bamniya	INC	88,447	43.38	Hakru Maida	BJP	70,081	34.37	18,366	9.01
Banswara	165	Bagidora (ST)	Mahendrajeet Singh	INC	97,638	49.35	Khemraj Garasiya	BJP	76,328	38.58	21,310	10.77
Banswara	166	Kushalgarh (ST)	Ramila Khadiya	IND	94,344	47.67	Bhima Bhai	BJP	75,394	38.10	18,950	9.57
Chittorgarh	167	Kapasan (SC)	Arjun Lal Jingar	BJP	81,470	42.01	Anandi Ram	INC	74,468	38.40	7,002	3.61
Chittorgarh	168	Begun	Bidhuri Rajendra Singh	INC	99,259	45.75	Dr. Suresh Dhaker	BJP	97,598	44.99	1,661	0.76
Chittorgarh	169	Chittorgarh	Chandrabhan Singh Aakya	BJP	1,06,563	53.41	Surendra Singh Jadawat	INC	82,669	41.43	23,894	11.98
Chittorgarh	170	Nimbahera	Anjana Udailal	INC	1,10,037	50.22	Shrichand Kriplani	BJP	98,129	44.79	11,908	5.43
Chittorgarh	171	Bari Sadri	Lalit Kumar Ostwal	BJP	97,111	48.18	Prakash Chaudhary	INC	88,301	43.80	8,810	4.38
Pratapgarh	172	Pratapgarh (ST)	Ramlal Meena	INC	1,00,625	51.69	Hemant Meena	BJP	83,945	43.12	16,680	8.57
Rajsamand	173	Bhim	Sudarshan Singh Rawat	INC	49,355	35.24	Hari Singh Chouhan	BJP	45,641	32.59	3,714	2.65
Rajsamand	174	Kumbhalgarh	Surendra Singh Rathore	BJP	70,803	50.72	Ganesh Singh	INC	52,360	37.51	18,443	13.21
Rajsamand	175	Rajsamand	Kiran Maheshwari	BJP	89,709	55.10	Narayan Singh Bhati	INC	65,086	39.98	24,623	15.12
Rajsamand	176	Nathdwara	C. P. Joshi	INC	88,384	50.99	Mahesh Pratap Singh	BJP	71,444	41.22	16,940	9.77
Bhilwara	177	Asind	Jabbar Singh Sankhala	BJP	70,249	35.26	Manish Mewara	INC	70,095	35.18	154	0.08
Bhilwara	178	Mandal	Ramlal Jat	INC	59,645	31.26	Pradhyuman Singh	IND	51,580	27.03	8,065	4.23
Bhilwara	179	Sahara	Kailash Trivedi	INC	65,420	37.46	Roop Lal Jat	BJP	58,414	33.45	7,006	4.01
Bhilwara	180	Bhilwara	Vitthal Shankar Awasthi	BJP	93,198	53.23	Om Prakash Naraniwal	IND	43,620	24.91	49,578	28.32
Shahpura	181	Shahpura (SC)	Kailash Chandra Meghwal	BJP	1,01,451	59.70	Mahaveer Prasad	INC	26,909	15.84	74,542	43.86
Shahpura	182	Jahazpur	Gopi Chand Meena	BJP	94,970	51.65	Dheeraj Gurjar	INC	81,717	44.44	13,253	7.21
Bhilwara	183	Mandalgarh	Gopal Lal Sharma	BJP	68,481	37.03	Vivek Dhakar	INC	58,148	31.44	10,333	5.59
Bundi	184	Hindoli	Ashok	INC	1,09,958	55.36	Omendra Singh Hada	BJP	79,417	39.98	30,541	15.38
Bundi	185	Keshoraipatan (SC)	Chandrakanta Meghwal	BJP	72,596	39.21	Rakesh Boyat	INC	65,477	35.36	7,119	3.85
Bundi	186	Bundi	Ashok Dogra	BJP	97,370	44.70	Harimohan Sharma	INC	96,657	44.38	713	0.32
Kota	187	Pipalda	Ramnarain Meena	INC	72,690	50.33	Mamta Sharma	BJP	57,785	40.01	14,905	10.32
Kota	188	Sangod	Bharat Singh Kundanpur	INC	74,154	47.87	Heera Lal Nagar	BJP	72,286	46.66	1,868	1.21
Kota	189	Kota North	Shanti Kumar Dhariwal	INC	94,728	53.36	Prahlad Gunjal	BJP	76,783	43.25	17,945	10.11
Kota	190	Kota South	Sandeep Sharma	BJP	82,739	48.57	Rakhi Gautam	INC	75,205	44.15	7,534	4.42
Kota	191	Ladpura	Kalpana Devi	BJP	1,04,912	52.80	Gulanaj Guddu	INC	83,256	41.90	21,656	10.90
Kota	192	Ramganj Mandi (SC)	Madan Dilawar	BJP	90,817	51.45	Ramgopal	INC	77,938	44.15	12,879	7.30
Baran	193	Anta	Pramod Bhaya	INC	97,160	58.09	Prabhu Lal Saini	BJP	63,097	37.73	34,063	20.36
Baran	194	Kishanganj (ST)	Nirmala Sahariya	INC	87,765	51.64	Lalit Meena	BJP	73,629	43.32	14,136	8.32
Baran	195	Baran-Atru (SC)	Pana Chand Meghwal	INC	86,986	50.51	Baboo Lal Verma	BJP	74,738	43.40	12,248	7.11
Baran	196	Chhabra	Pratap Singh	BJP	79,707	44.16	Karan Singh	INC	75,963	42.09	3,744	2.07
Jhalawar	197	Dag (SC)	Kaluram	BJP	1,03,665	52.33	Madan Lal	INC	84,152	42.48	19,513	9.85
Jhalawar	198	Jhalrapatan	Vasundhara Raje	BJP	1,16,484	54.14	Manvendra Singh	INC	81,504	37.88	34,980	16.26
Jhalawar	199	Khanpur	Narendra Nagar	BJP	85,984	46.92	Suresh	INC	83,719	45.68	2,265	1.24
Jhalawar	200	Manohar Thana	Govind Prasad	BJP	1,10,215	53.41	Kailash Chand	INC	88,346	42.81	21,869	10.60

== Adjourned Election ==
S.No	Date	Constituency	MLA before election	Party before election	Elected MLA	Party after election
1	28 January 2019	Ramgarh	Election Cancelled in 2018 Assembly Election		Shafia Zubair	Indian National Congress

== Bypolls (2018-2023) ==
S.No	Date	Constituency	MLA before election	Party before election	Elected MLA	Party after election
110	21 October 2019	Khinwsar	Hanuman Beniwal	Rashtriya Loktantrik Party	Narayan Beniwal	Rashtriya Loktantrik Party
28	21 October 2019	Mandawa	Narendra Kumar	Bharatiya Janata Party	Rita Choudhary	Indian National Congress
24	17 April 2021	Sujangarh	Bhanwarlal Meghwal	Indian National Congress	Manoj Meghwal	Indian National Congress
175	17 April 2021	Rajsamand	Kiran Maheshwari	Bharatiya Janata Party	Deepti Maheshwari	Bharatiya Janata Party
179	17 April 2021	Sahara	Kailash Chandra Trivedi	Indian National Congress	Gayatri Devi Trivedi	Indian National Congress
155	30 October 2021	Vallabhnagar	Gajendra Singh Shaktawat	Indian National Congress	Preeti Shaktawat	Indian National Congress
157	30 October 2021	Dhariawad	Gautam Lal Meena	Bharatiya Janata Party	Nagraj Meena	Indian National Congress
21	5 December 2022	Sardarshahar	Bhanwar Lal Sharma	Indian National Congress	Anil Kumar Sharma	Indian National Congress

== See also ==
- Elections in India
- 2018 elections in India
