= Maru Pradesh =

Region and proposed state in northwest India

- Proposed state of India
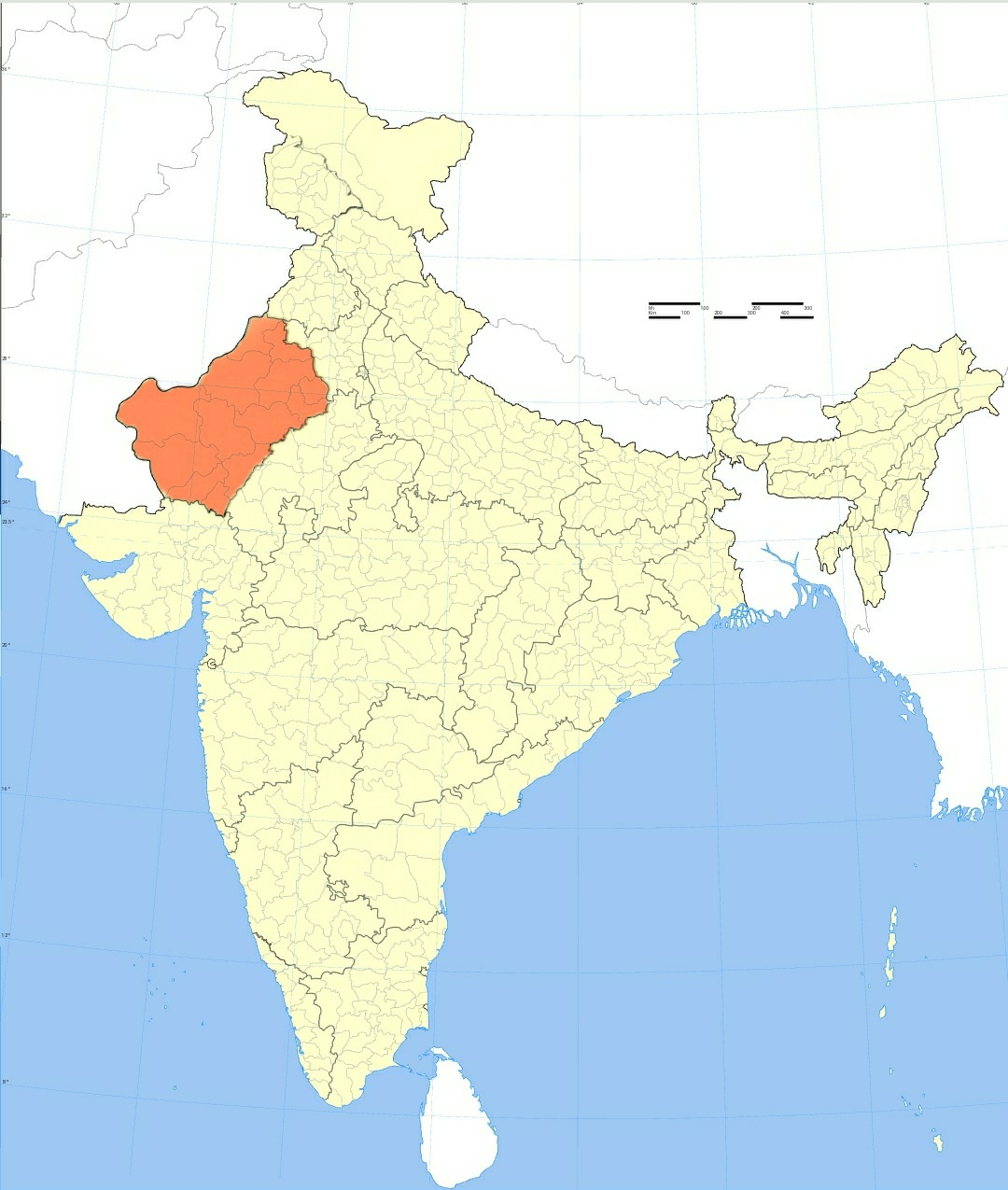
- Country: India
- Capital: Bikaner
- Districts: Jalore district; Balotra district; Barmer district; Sanchore district; Sirohi district; Didwana Kuchaman district; Hanumangarh district; Jaisalmer district; Bikaner district; Jhunjhunu district; Jodhpur district; Jodhpur Rural district; Nagaur district; Pali district; Phalodi district; Anupgarh district; Sikar district; Churu district; Sri Ganganagar district; Beawar district

Area
  - Total: 213,887 km^{2} (82,582 sq mi)

Population (2011)
  - Total: 28,132,949
  - Density: 131.532/km^{2} (340.666/sq mi)

Languages
  - Official: Marwari; Hindi; English
  - Regional: Bagri; Punjabi; Shekhawati
- Largest cities: Jodhpur; Jalore; Bishangarh; Bikaner; Balotra; Bhinmal; Sujangarh; Nokha; Sri Ganganagar; Churu

Maru Pradesh is a geographical, cultural, social, economic, political and linguistic region of the Thar Desert in the Northwest India. It is also a proposed state in India with its proposed capital being Bikaner, the largest city of Maru Pradesh. It would be carved out from the state of Rajasthan. The proposed state would consist the districts of Jalore, Balotra, Barmer, Sanchore, Sirohi, Didwana Kuchaman, Hanumangarh, Jaisalmer, Bikaner, Jhunjhunu, Jodhpur, Jodhpur Rural, Nagaur, Pali, Phalodi, Anupgarh, Sikar, Churu, Sri Ganganagar, Beawar.

== History ==
When Rajasthan was being formed, Jodhpur and Bikaner states strongly opposed the merger of Rajasthan, and both states favoured creating a desert state. It is said that the then ruler of Jodhpur, Hanwant Singh, went to the first Lok Sabha wearing a black turban in protest against the merger into Rajasthan.

Following this, in 1953, Pratap Singh, the former Minister of Bikaner State, protested against the merger of Rajasthan and Bikaner not being constituted as a desert state. He named the protest Bikaner Bandh.

In 1956, when new states were formed, many memoranda were also given, and the government ignored the international border, citing security. From time to time, voices in different parts arose in support of the proposed Maru Pradesh.

Former MP Swami Keshavanand not only voiced his opinion but also wrote in his book, Marubhoomi Seva, that the entire development of this desert will happen only when this desert becomes a separate state.

Gumanmal Lodha started this movement in Jodhpur and became an MP from Pali District.

In 1998, Former Maharaja Gajsingh of Jodhpur said that this desert would be developed by becoming a desert state.

Amrit Nahata, MP from Barmer, the author Dilsukh Rai Chaudhary Sikar, Chandra Prakash Deora of Jodhpur, former foreign minister Jaswant Singh, and others also voiced protests.

When Prime Minister Atal Bihari Vajpayee created three new states in 2000, former Chief Minister of Rajasthan Bhairon Singh Shekhawat wrote a letter saying that creating Maru Pradesh would support the development of the entirety of Rajasthan and the internal security of the country.

In 2014 Sona Ram, a former MP from Barmer also raised the demand for the development of the desert. Similarly, Congress leader Rameshwar Lal Dudi, Bhadra former MLA Suresh Chaudhary, and MP and RLP leader Hanuman Beniwal have also expressed support for Maru Pradesh.

In 2018 Hanuman Singh Khangata and BJP Leader Gajendra Singh Rajpurohit Tunkliya said that a separate state is our need and now the time has come to protest. Rajpurohit said that no matter who the government is, we will take the movement forward. He informed about the outline of the movement of the Maru Pradesh Morcha and said that after the announcement of the visit of Chief Minister Vasundhara Raje, the Morcha will also take out the Maru Pradesh Yatra and will make the public aware.

== Demographics ==
Per the Census 2011 data, the total population of the proposed state is 28,132,949.

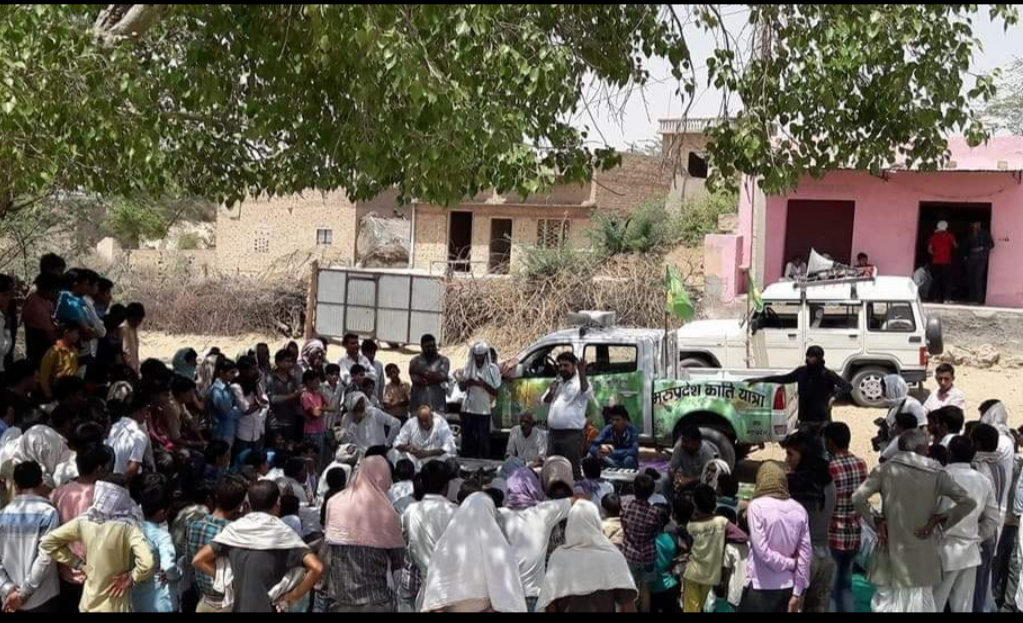

Religions in Maru Pradesh
Religion	Percent
Hindus	86.62%
Muslims	10.02%
Sikhs	2.57%
Jains	0.61%
Others	0.18%
