= Pathmeda =

- Village
- Location in Rajasthan, India Pathmeda (India)
- Coordinates: 24°43′19″N 71°50′52″E
- Country: India
- State: Rajasthan
- District: Jalore
- Gram Panchayat: Danta

Area
  - Total: 830 ha (2,100 acres)

Population (2011)
  - Total: 1,410
- Time zone: UTC+5:30 (IST)
- PIN: 343041
- ISO 3166 code: RJ-IN
- Vehicle registration: RJ-46

Pathmeda is a village in Sanchore district of the Indian state of Rajasthan. Pathmeda is about 12 km (7.5 mi) from Sanchore. Pathmeda is an important village in Sanchore. According to 2011 census the population of Pathmeda village is 1410. Pathmeda is famous for the world's largest Gaushala Shri Pathmeda Godham Mahatirtha.
