= Jaipur Gramin district =

District in Rajasthan

Jaipur Gramin
- District of Rajasthan
- Location of Jaipur Rural district in Rajasthan
- Country: India
- State: Rajasthan
- Division: Jaipur
- Established: 2023
- Headquarters: Jaipur

Jaipur Gramin district (translated as: Jaipur Rural) is a district of the state of Rajasthan in Northern India. The city of Jaipur, which is Rajasthan's capital and largest city, is the district headquarters.

== Administrative divisions ==
By reorganizing Jaipur district, a new district Jaipur Rural has been formed whose headquarters will be Jaipur (city). The newly formed Jaipur rural district includes 13 Upkhands (subdivisions) and 18 tehsils (subdistricts).

=== List of Upkhands (subdivisions) ===
1. Jaipur
2. Sanganer
3. Amer
4. Bassi
5. Jamwaramgarh
6. Chaksu
7. Chomu
8. Sambharlake
9. Madhorajpura
10. Rampura Dabari
11. Kishangarh Renwal
12. Jobner
13. Shahpura

=== List of Tehsils (subdistricts) ===
1. Phulera Tehsil
2. Shahpura Tehsil
3. Jobner Tehsil
4. Kishangarh-renwal Tehsil
5. Madhorajpura Tehsil
6. Rampura Dabari Tehsil
7. Jamwaramgarh Tehsil
8. Kotkhawda Tehsil
9. Chaksu Tehsil
10. Tunga Tehsil
11. Bassi Tehsil
12. Aandhi Tehsil
13. Jalsu Tehsil
14. Chomu Tehsil
15. Sanganer Tehsil
16. Kalwad Tehsil
17. Amer Tehsil
18. Jaipur Tehsil
- NOTE :- Sanganer Tehsil, Kalwad Tehsil, Jaipur Tehsil and Amer Tehsil carved after leaving the area of Jaipur Municipal Corporation and Jaipur Urban district.

== 2024 updates ==
On 28 December 2024, the Cabinet of Rajasthan decided not to retain 9 new districts- Anupgarh, Dudu, Gangapur City, Jaipur Rural, Jodhpur Rural, Kekri, Neem Ka Thana, Sanchore, and Sanchore, and Shahpura- along with the 3 newly created divisions—Banswara, Pali, and Sikar.

== See also ==
- Jaipur
- Jaipur district
- History of Jaipur
- Kingdom of Amber
- Jaipur Nagar Nigam
- Jodhpur Gramin district
- List of districts of Rajasthan
- Jaipur Lok Sabha constituency
- Jaipur Rural Lok Sabha constituency
