= Neem Ka Thana district =

Neem Ka Thana
- Former District of Rajasthan
- Neem Ka Thana
- Coordinates: 27.735018°N 75.779730°E
- Country: India
- State: Rajasthan
- Division: Sikar
- District: Neem Ka Thana
- Elevation: 446 m (1,463 ft)

Languages
  - Official: Dhundhari, Hindi, Rajasthani
  - Spoken: Shekhawati & Torawati
- Time zone: UTC+5:30 (IST)
- PIN: 332713
- ISO 3166 code: RJ-IN
- Vehicle registration: RJ-23B
- Website: https://neemkathana.rajasthan.gov.in/

Neem Ka Thana was a district of the western Indian state of Rajasthan. It was formed in July 2023 out of parts of Sikar and Jhunjhunu districts and abolished in December 2024. Its headquarters were at Neem Ka Thana.

The entire district was formerly under Jaipur state. Neem Ka Thana has five tehsils: Neem Ka Thana, Patan, Sri Madhopur (formerly under Sikar district) and Khetri, Udaipurwati (formerly under Jhunjhunu district). Notable Towns under Neem Ka Thana Districts were Udaipurwati, Khetri, Ponkh, Sri Madhopur, Patan

== Places ==
- AJIT-VIVEK MUSEUM (Ramakrishna Mission Vivekananda Smriti Mandir) रामकृष्ण मिशन विवेकानंद स्मृति मंदिर
- Mansa Mata Forest Conservation Reserve, Guda-Ponkh
- Ganeshwar Dham
- Guhala Fort
- Baba Rameshwar Das Temple
- Baleshwar Temple
- Sarund Mata Mandir
