= GangapurCity district =

Gangapur City
- District of Rajasthan
- Country: India
- State: Rajasthan
- Division: Bharatpur
- Established: 2023 (cancelled in December 2024)
- Headquarters: Gangapur City

Government
  - District Collector & Magistrate: Dr. Gaurav Saini, IAS
  - Superintendent of Police: Sujeet Shankar, IPS

Area
  - Total: 2,536 km^{2} (979 sq mi)

Population
  - Total: 920,340
  - Density: 362.91/km^{2} (939.9/sq mi)
  - Urban: 153,038

Languages
  - Official | Spoken: Hindi, Braj and Dhundhari
- Time zone: UTC+05:30 (IST)
- Website: Gangapur City District

Gangapur City district was a District of Rajasthan state in northwest India. Gangapur City was the district headquarter of it. It was come under Bharatpur Division. The district was established in 2023 and cancelled in December 2024.

== Demographics ==
Religions in Gangapur City district (2011)
| Religion | Percent |
| Hinduism | 91.17% |
| Islam | 8.36% |
| Other or not stated | 0.47% |

At the time of the 2011 census, what is now Gangapur City district has a population of 920,340. Gangapur City has a sex ratio of 875 females per 1000 males. 153,038 (16.63%) lived in urban areas. Scheduled Castes and Scheduled Tribes made up 192,321 (20.90%) and 226,406 (24.60%) of the population respectively.

Languages of Gangapur City district (2011)
1. Hindi & Rajasthani (97.7%)
2. Urdu (1.61%)
3. Others (0.72%)

At the time of the 2011 census, 97.67% of the population spoke Hindi & Rajasthani and 1.61% Urdu as their first language.

== 2024 updates ==
On 30 December 2024, the Government of Rajasthan officially cancelled 9 new districts including: Anupgarh, Dudu, Gangapur City, Jaipur Rural, Jodhpur Rural, Kekri, Neem Ka Thana, Sanchore, and Shahpura along with also cancelled the 3 newly created divisions (Sambhags) including: Banswara, Pali, and Sikar.

== See also ==
- Gangapur City
- Sawai Madhopur
