= Kekri district =

District of Indian state of Rajasthan

- Former district
- Location of Kekri district in Rajasthan
- Coordinates (Kekri district headquarters): 25°58′N 75°09′E
- Country: India
- State: Rajasthan
- Division: Ajmer
- Established: 7 August 2023
- Headquarters: Kekri

Kekri district is a former district of the Indian state of Rajasthan, it is now under Ajmer district. It was located in central Rajasthan. It was formally established on 7 August 2023 by the Chief Minister Ashok Gehlot, and was carved out from parts of Ajmer district and Tonk district.

== Demographics ==
Religions in Kekri district (2011)
| Religion | Percent |
| Hinduism | 93.15% |
| Islam | 5.28% |
| Jainism | 1.40% |
| Other or not stated | 0.17% |

At the time of the 2011 census, Kekri district had a population of 630,832 and a sex ratio of 967 females per 1000 males. 85,821 (13.60%) lived in urban areas. 133,278 (21.13%) and 44,214 (7.01%) of the population respectively.

Languages of Kekri district (2011)
1. Rajasthani (70.2%)
2. Dhundhari (15.7%)
3. Marwari (6.76%)
4. Hindi (6.64%)
5. Others (0.70%)

At the time of the 2011 census, 70.20% of the population spoke Rajasthani, 15.70% Dhundhari, 6.76% Marwari and 6.64% Hindi as their first language.

== Recent Updates ==
On 28 December 2024, the Cabinet of Rajasthan decided not to retain 9 new districts- Anupgarh, Dudu, Gangapur City, Jaipur Rural, Jodhpur Rural, Kekri, Neem Ka Thana, Sanchore, and Shahpura- along with the 3 newly created divisions--Banswara, Pali, and Sikar.
