= Jodhpur Gramin district =

District in Rajasthan

Jodhpur Gramin
- District of Rajasthan
- Jodhpur Gramin
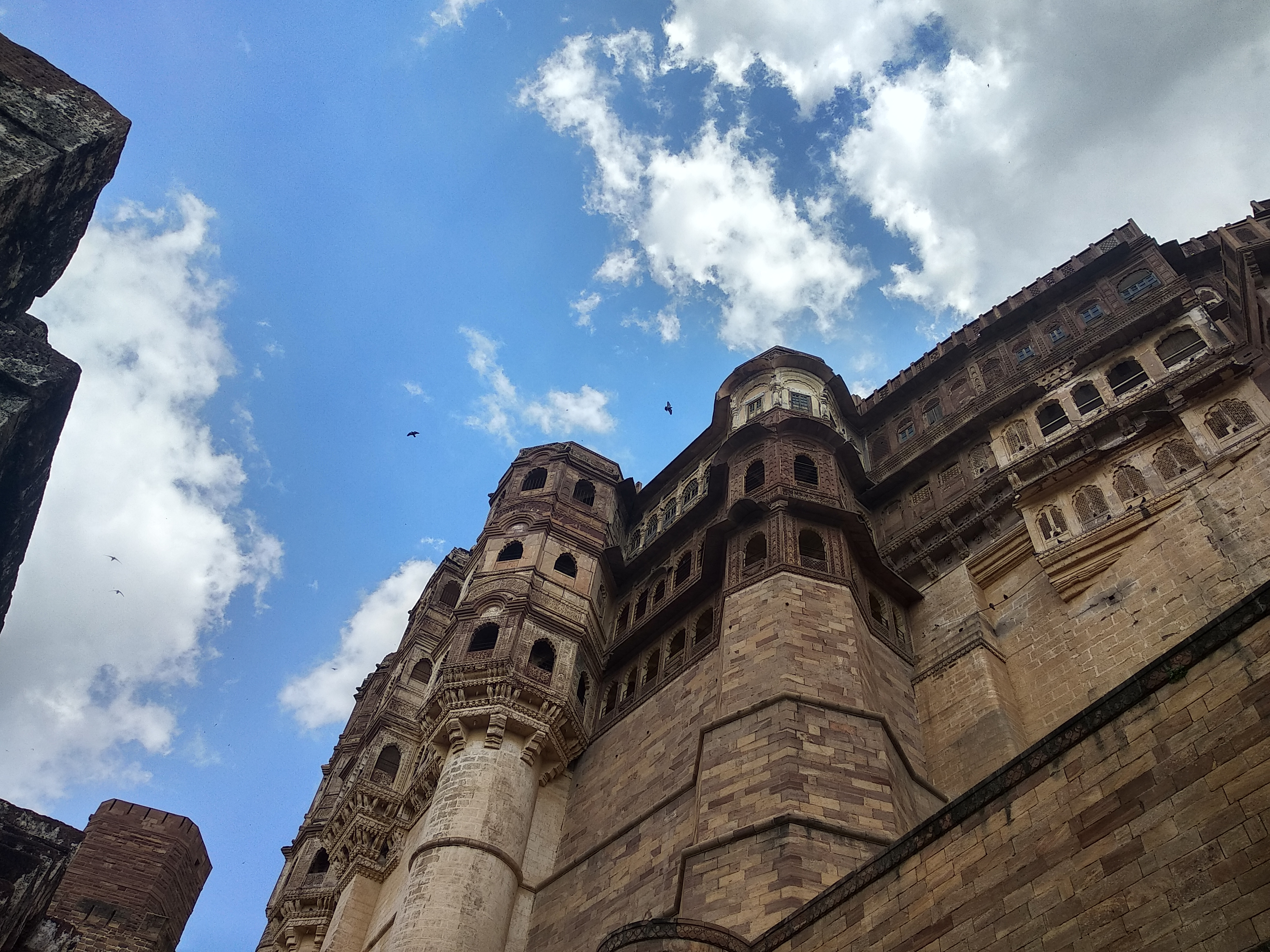
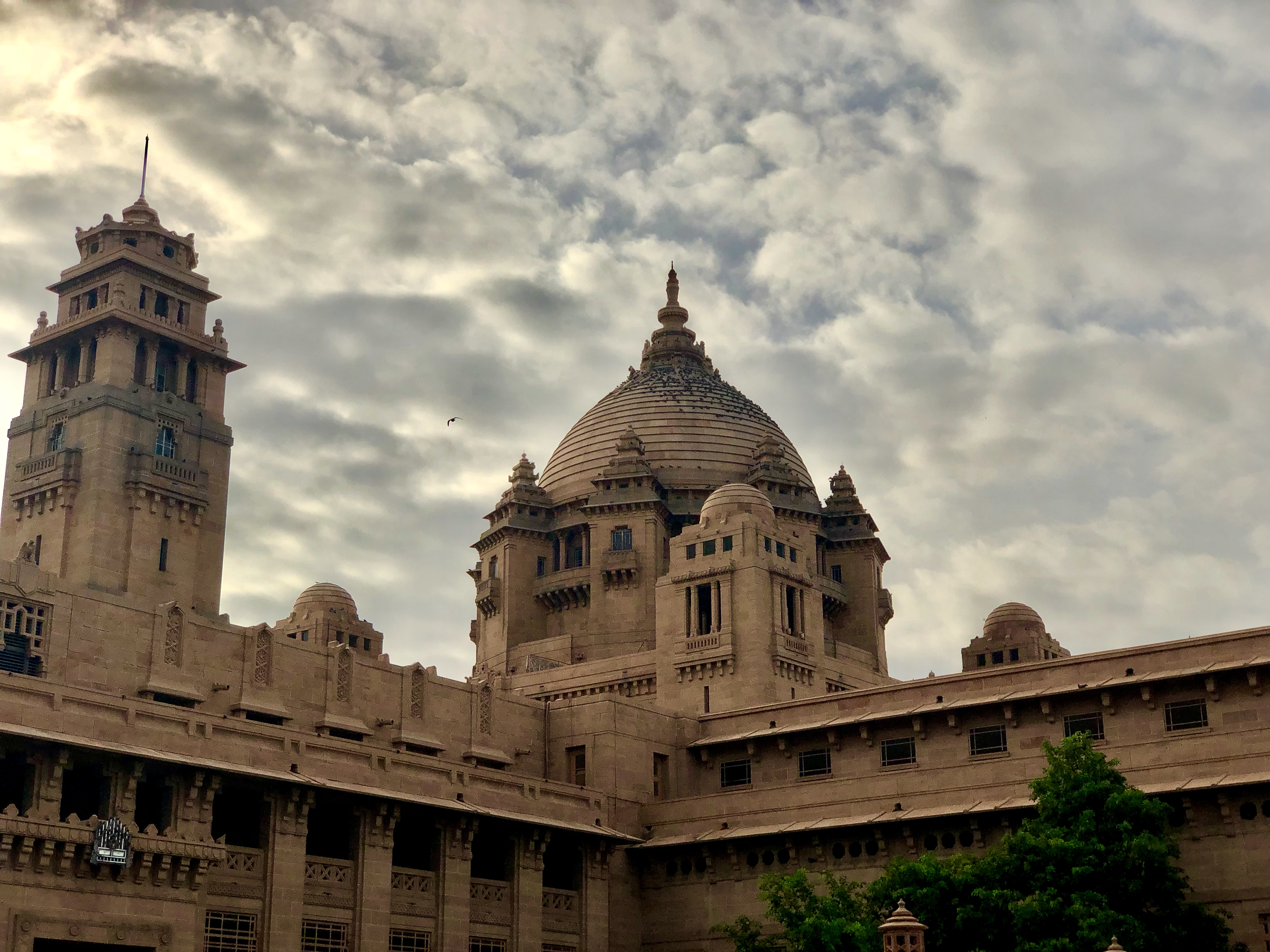
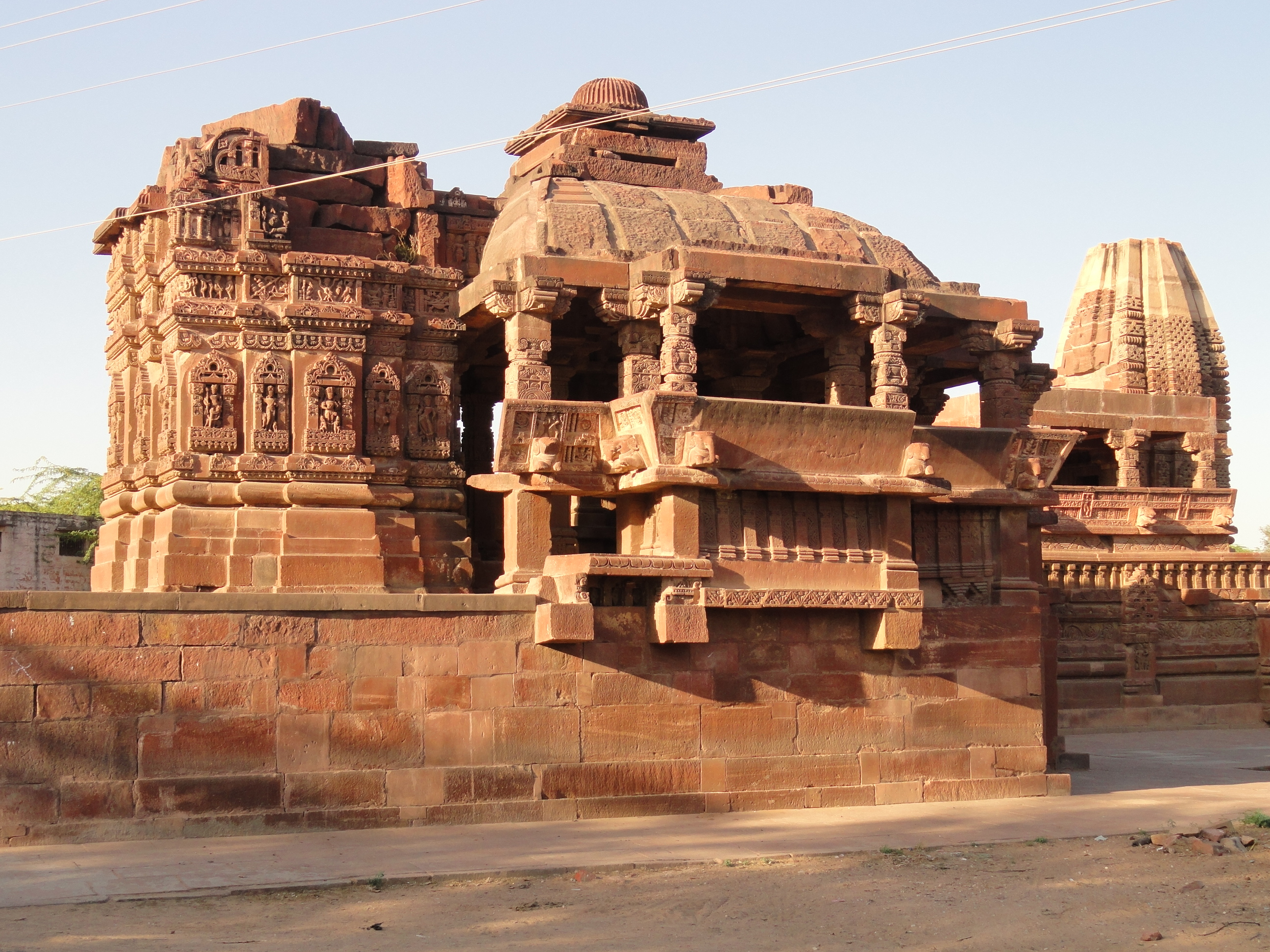
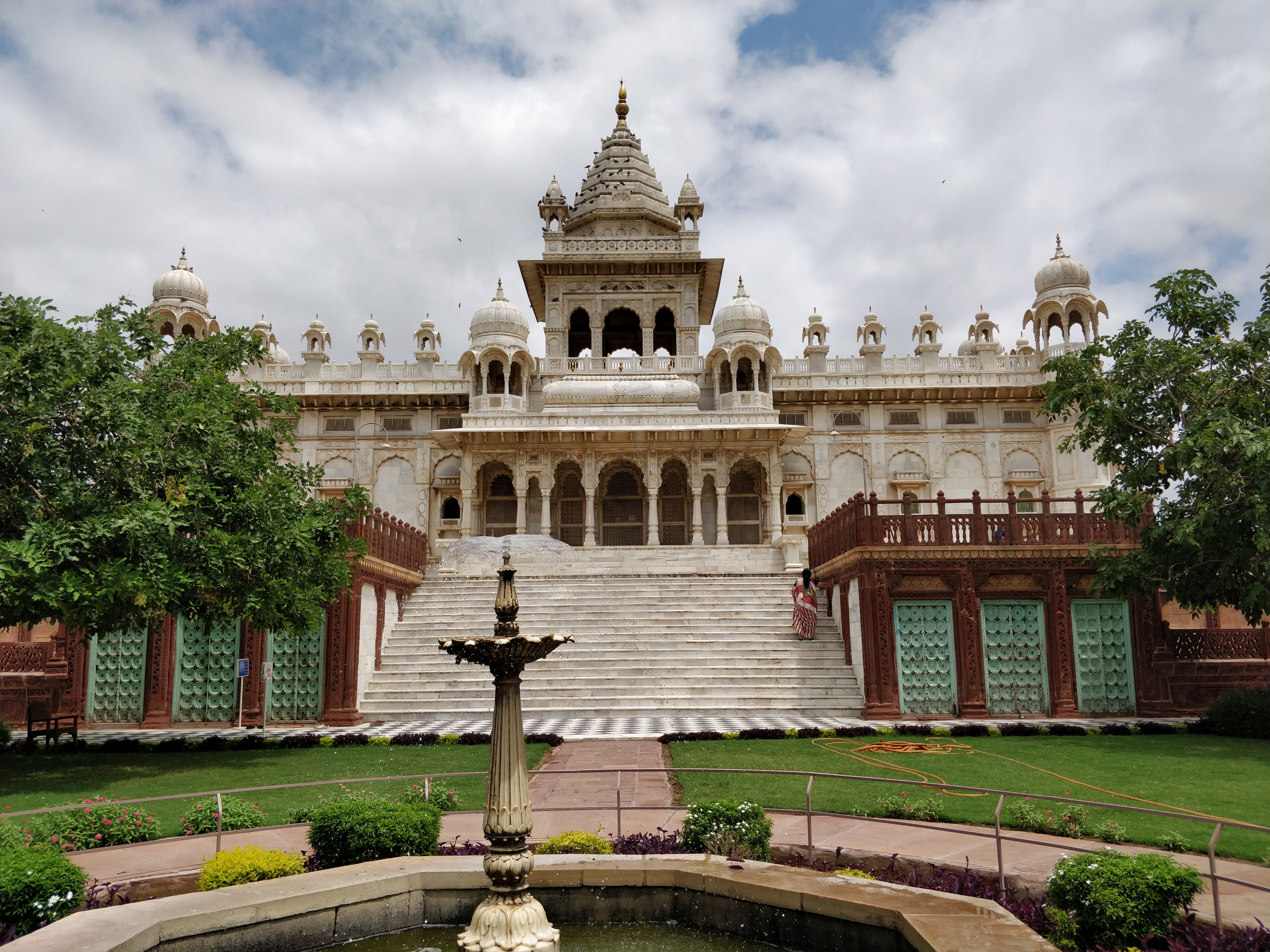
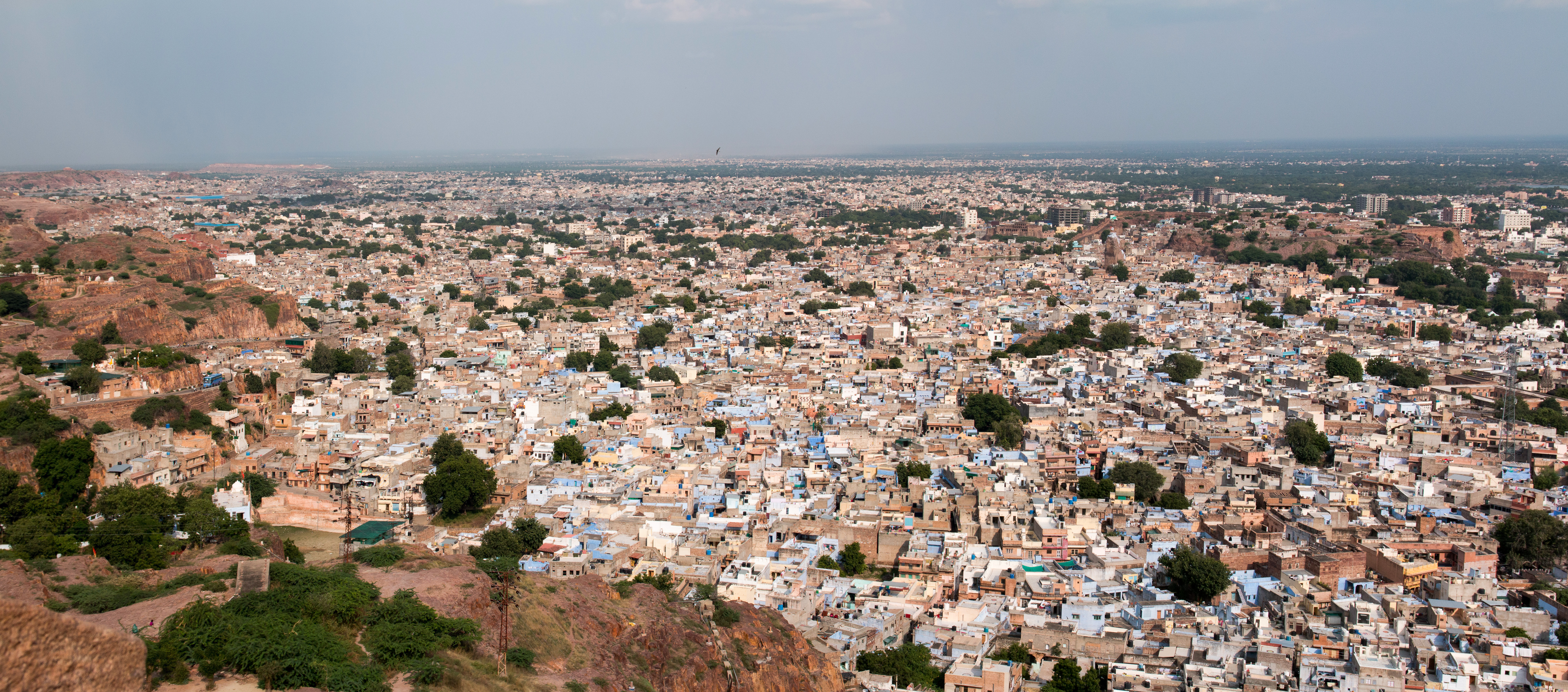
- Clockwise from top-left: Meherangarh Fort, Umaid Bhawan Palace, Jaswant Thada, View of Jodhpur skyline, Osiyan Mata Temple in Osiyan
- Interactive map of Jodhpur Gramin
- Coordinates (Jodhpur): 27.62°N 72.92°E - 26.00°N 73.87°E
- Country: India
- State: Rajasthan
- Division: Jodhpur division
- Established: 7 August 2023
- Headquarters: Jodhpur Gramin
- Tehsils: Jodhpur North, Jodhpur South, Luni, Bilara, Bhopalgadh, Pipar City, Osian, Bavri, Shergadh, Balesar

Government
  - Lok Sabha constituencies: Jodhpur

Area
  - Total: 22,850 km^{2} (8,820 sq mi)

Population (2011)
  - Total: 3,687,165
  - Density: 161.4/km^{2} (417.9/sq mi)
  - Urban: 34.30 percent

Demographics
- Time zone: UTC+05:30 (IST)
- Vehicle registration: RJ-19, RJ-54
- Website: jodhpur.rajasthan.gov.in

Jodhpur Gramin district (translated as: Jodhpur Rural) was a district in Rajasthan state of India. This district was formed on 7 August 2023. Its administrative headquarters was Jodhpur district.

== 2024 updates ==
On 28 December 2024, the Cabinet of Rajasthan decided not to retain 9 new districts- Anupgarh, Dudu, Gangapur City, Jaipur Rural, Jodhpur Rural, Kekri, Neem Ka Thana, Sanchore, and Sanchore, and Shahpura- along with the 3 newly created divisions—Banswara, Pali, and Sikar.

== See also ==
- Jodhpur
- Jodhpur district
- Jaipur district
- Jaipur Gramin district
- List of districts of Rajasthan
- Jodhpur Lok Sabha constituency
