= Sanchore district =

District of Rajasthan in India

- District of Rajasthan
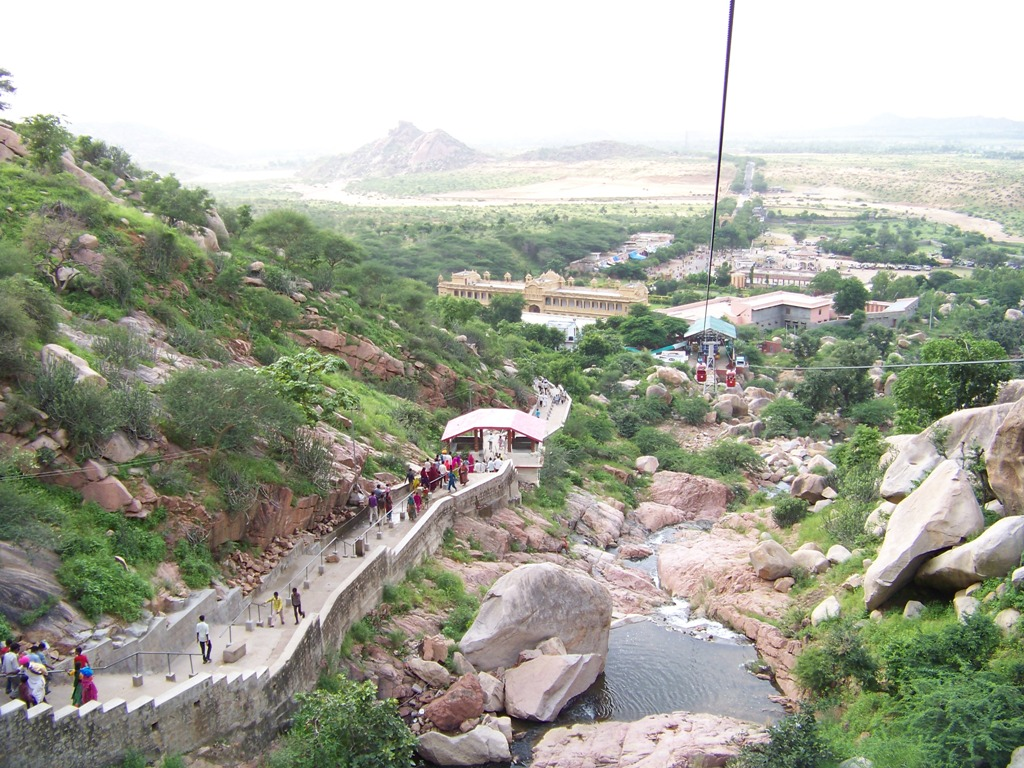
- Sundha Mata Temple

- Location of Jalore district in Rajasthan
- Country: India
- State: Rajasthan
- Division: Pali
- Established: 7 August 2023
- Headquarters: Sanchore

Area
  - Total: 2,996 km^{2} (1,157 sq mi)

Population (2011)
  - Total: 845,430
  - Density: 282.2/km^{2} (730.9/sq mi)
- Time zone: UTC+05:30 (IST)
- PIN: 343041
- Vehicle registration: RJ-46
- Website: sanchore.rajasthan.gov.in

Sanchore district was a district of the state of Rajasthan in western India. Its administrative headquarters was the city of Sanchore. The district came into existence on 7 August 2023 as one of the 19 new districts of Rajasthan announced by Chief Minister Ashok Gehlot, by separating from Jalore district. After one year, on 28 Dec 2024 new Rajasthan cabinet decided to remove Sanchore as district and a notification was issued on the next day for the same. Meghwal is larger and dominant ethnic group of district. Bishnoi, Anjana and Rajput also have significant population in district.

Sanchore is a town in Rajasthan.

== Demographics ==
Religions in Sanchore district (2011)
Religion	Percent
Hinduism	94.50%
Islam	4.74%
Jainism	0.65%
Other or not stated	0.11%

At the time of the 2011 census, the area that would become Sanchore district had a population of 845,430. Sanchore district had 438,753 males and 406,677 females for a sex ratio of 927 females per 1000 males. 32,875 (3.89%) lived in urban areas. Scheduled Castes and Scheduled Tribes made up 158,826 (18.79%) and 69,492 (8.22%) respectively.

Languages of Sanchore district (2011)
1. Marwari (56.4%)
2. Rajasthani (41.7%)
3. Others (1.87%)

At the time of the 2011 census, 56.39% of the population spoke Marwari and 41.74% Rajasthani as their first language. Speakers of Gujarati and Sindhi are also present in the district in small numbers.

== 2024 updates ==
On 28 December 2024, the Cabinet of Rajasthan decided not to retain 9 new districts- Anupgarh, Dudu, Gangapur City, Jaipur Rural, Jodhpur Rural, Kekri, Neem Ka Thana, Sanchore, and Shahpura- along with the 3 newly created divisions--Banswara, Pali, and Sikar.
