= List of Lok Sabha members from Rajasthan =

This is the List of members of the Lok Sabha, representing from Rajasthan. These lower house members of the Indian Parliament were elected in the Indian general election.

== 18th Lok Sabha ==

Keys:

NDA (14)
- BJP (14)
INDIA (11)
- INC (8)
- CPI(M) (1)
- BAP (1)
- RLP (1)

No.	Constituency	Name	Party
1	Ganganagar (SC)	Kuldeep Indora	Indian National Congress
2	Bikaner (SC)	Arjun Ram Meghwal	Bharatiya Janata Party
3	Churu	Rahul Kaswan	Indian National Congress
4	Jhunjhunu	Brijendra Singh Ola	Indian National Congress
5	Sikar	Amra Ram	Communist Party of India (Marxist)
6	Jaipur Rural	Rao Rajendra Singh	Bharatiya Janata Party
7	Jaipur	Manju Sharma	Bharatiya Janata Party
8	Alwar	Bhupender Yadav	Bharatiya Janata Party
9	Bharatpur (SC)	Sanjana Jatav	Indian National Congress
10	Karauli–Dholpur (SC)	Bhajan Lal Jatav	Indian National Congress
11	Dausa (ST)	Murari Lal Meena	Indian National Congress
12	Tonk–Sawai Madhopur	Harish Meena	Indian National Congress
13	Ajmer	Bhagirath Chaudhary	Bharatiya Janata Party
14	Nagaur	Hanuman Beniwal	Rashtriya Loktantrik Party
15	Pali	P. P. Chaudhary	Bharatiya Janata Party
16	Jodhpur	Gajendra Singh Shekhawat	Bharatiya Janata Party
17	Barmer	Ummeda Ram Beniwal	Indian National Congress
18	Jalore	Lumbaram Choudhary	Bharatiya Janata Party
19	Udaipur (ST)	Manna Lal Rawat	Bharatiya Janata Party
20	Banswara (ST)	Rajkumar Roat	Bharat Adivasi Party
21	Chittorgarh	Chandra Prakash Joshi	Bharatiya Janata Party
22	Rajsamand	Mahima Kumari Mewar	Bharatiya Janata Party
23	Bhilwara	Damodar Agarwal	Bharatiya Janata Party
24	Kota	Om Birla	Bharatiya Janata Party
25	Jhalawar-Baran	Dushyant Singh	Bharatiya Janata Party

== 17th Lok Sabha ==
List of members (17 June 2019 – 16 June 2024) representation in Lok Sabha. These members of the Lower house of the Indian Parliament were elected in the 2019 Indian general election held in April–May 2019.Keys: BJP (20) INC (1) Vacant (4)

#	Constituency	Name	Party
1	Ganganagar (SC)	Nihal Chand Chauhan	Bharatiya Janata Party
2	Bikaner (SC)	Arjun Ram Meghwal	Bharatiya Janata Party
3	Churu	Rahul Kaswan (Won on BJP ticket but later joined INC)	Indian National Congress
4	Jhunjhunu	Narendra Kumar	Bharatiya Janata Party
5	Sikar	Sumedhanand Saraswati	Bharatiya Janata Party
6	Jaipur Rural	Rajyavardhan Singh Rathore (Resigned on 6 December 2023)	Bharatiya Janata Party
6	Jaipur Rural	Vacant	
7	Jaipur	Ramcharan Bohara	Bharatiya Janata Party
8	Alwar	Balak Nath (Resigned on 7 December 2023)	Bharatiya Janata Party
8	Alwar	Vacant	
9	Bharatpur (SC)	Ranjeeta Koli	Bharatiya Janata Party
10	Karauli–Dholpur (SC)	Manoj Rajoria	Bharatiya Janata Party
11	Dausa (ST)	Jaskaur Meena	Bharatiya Janata Party
12	Tonk–Sawai Madhopur	Sukhbir Singh Jaunapuria	Bharatiya Janata Party
13	Ajmer	Bhagirath Choudhary	Bharatiya Janata Party
14	Nagaur	Hanuman Beniwal (Resigned on 8 December 2023)	Rashtriya Loktantrik Party
14	Nagaur	Vacant	
15	Pali	P. P. Chaudhary	Bharatiya Janata Party
16	Jodhpur	Gajendra Singh Shekhawat	Bharatiya Janata Party
17	Barmer	Kailash Choudhary	Bharatiya Janata Party
18	Jalore	Devaji Patel	Bharatiya Janata Party
19	Udaipur (ST)	Arjun Lal Meena	Bharatiya Janata Party
20	Banswara (ST)	Kanak Mal Katara	Bharatiya Janata Party
21	Chittorgarh	Chandra Prakash Joshi	Bharatiya Janata Party
22	Rajsamand	Diya Kumari (Resigned on 6 December 2023)	Bharatiya Janata Party
22	Rajsamand	Vacant	
23	Bhilwara	Subhash Chandra Baheria	Bharatiya Janata Party
24	Kota	Om Birla	Bharatiya Janata Party
25	Jhalawar	Dushyant Singh	Bharatiya Janata Party

== 16th Lok Sabha ==
Keys: BJP (22) INC (1) Vacant (2)

No.	Constituency	Name of elected M.P.	Party affiliation
1	Ganganagar (SC)	Nihalchand	Bharatiya Janata Party
2	Bikaner (SC)	Arjun Ram Meghwal	Bharatiya Janata Party
3	Churu	Rahul Kaswan	Bharatiya Janata Party
4	Jhunjhunu	Santosh Ahlawat	Bharatiya Janata Party
5	Sikar	Sumedhanand Saraswati	Bharatiya Janata Party
6	Tonk–Sawai Madhopur	Sukhbir Singh Jaunapuria	Bharatiya Janata Party
7	Jaipur	Ramcharan Bohara	Bharatiya Janata Party
8	Alwar	Chand Nath (Died on 17 September 2017)	Bharatiya Janata Party
8	Alwar	Karan Singh Yadav (Elected on 1 February 2018)	Indian National Congress
9	Bharatpur (SC)	Bahadur Singh Koli	Bharatiya Janata Party
10	Karauli–Dholpur (SC)	Manoj Rajoria	Bharatiya Janata Party
11	Dausa (ST)	Harish Meena (Resigned on 24 December 2018)	Bharatiya Janata Party
11	Dausa (ST)	Vacant	
12	Jaipur Rural	Rajyavardhan Singh Rathore	Bharatiya Janata Party
13	Ajmer	Sanwar Lal Jat (Died on 9 August 2017)	Bharatiya Janata Party
13	Ajmer	Raghu Sharma (Elected on 1 February 2018 and Resigned on 21 December 2018)	Indian National Congress
13	Ajmer	Vacant	
14	Nagaur	C R Choudhary	Bharatiya Janata Party
15	Pali	P P Choudhary	Bharatiya Janata Party
16	Jodhpur	Gajendrasingh Shekhawat	Bharatiya Janata Party
17	Barmer	Sonaram Choudhary	Bharatiya Janata Party
18	Jalore	Devji Patel	Bharatiya Janata Party
19	Udaipur (ST)	Arjunlal Meena	Bharatiya Janata Party
20	Banswara (ST)	Manshankar Ninama	Bharatiya Janata Party
21	Chittorgarh	Chandraprakash Joshi	Bharatiya Janata Party
22	Rajsamand	Hariom Singh Rathore	Bharatiya Janata Party
23	Bhilwara	Subhash Baheria	Bharatiya Janata Party
24	Kota	Om Birla	Bharatiya Janata Party
25	Jhalawar	Dushyant Singh	Bharatiya Janata Party

== 15th Lok Sabha ==
Keys: INC (19) BJP (4) Vacant (2)

No.	Constituency	Name of elected M.P.	Party affiliation
1	Ganganagar	Bharat Ram Meghwal	Indian National Congress
2	Bikaner	Arjun Ram Meghwal	Bharatiya Janata Party
3	Churu	Ram Singh Kaswan	Bharatiya Janata Party
4	Jhunjhunu	Sis Ram Ola (Died on 15 December 2013)	Indian National Congress
4	Jhunjhunu	Vacant	
5	Sikar	Mahadeo Singh Khandela	Indian National Congress
6	Jaipur Rural	Lal Chand Kataria	Indian National Congress
7	Jaipur	Mahesh Joshi	Indian National Congress
8	Alwar	Jitendra Singh	Indian National Congress
9	Bharatpur	Ratan Singh	Indian National Congress
10	Karauli-Dholpur	Khiladi Lal Bairwa	Indian National Congress
11	Dausa	Kirodi Lal Meena (Resigned on 19 December 2013)	Independent
11	Dausa	Vacant	
12	Sawai Madopur - Tonk	Namo Narain Meena	Indian National Congress
13	Ajmer	Sachin Pilot	Indian National Congress
14	Nagaur	Jyoti Mirdha	Indian National Congress
15	Pali	Badri Ram Jakhar	Indian National Congress
16	Jodhpur	Chandresh Kumari	Indian National Congress
17	Barmer	Harish Chaudhary	Indian National Congress
18	Jalore	Devji Patel	Bharatiya Janata Party
19	Udaipur	Raghuvir Meena	Indian National Congress
20	Banswara	Tarachand Bhagora	Indian National Congress
21	Chittorgarh	Girija Vyas	Indian National Congress
22	Rajsamand	Gopal Singh Shekhawat	Indian National Congress
23	Bhilwara	C P Joshi	Indian National Congress
24	Kota	Ijyaraj Singh	Indian National Congress
25	Jhalawar-Baran	Dushyant Singh	Bharatiya Janata Party

== 14th Lok Sabha ==
Keys: BJP (21) INC (4)

No.	Constituency	Name of elected M.P.	Party affiliation
1	Ganganagar	Nihalchand Chauhan	Bharatiya Janata Party
2	Bikaner	Dharmendra	Bharatiya Janata Party
3	Churu	Ram Singh Kaswan	Bharatiya Janata Party
4	Jhunjhunu	Sis Ram Ola	Indian National Congress
5	Sikar	Subhash Maharia	Bharatiya Janata Party
6	Jaipur	Girdhari Lal Bhargava	Bharatiya Janata Party
7	Dausa	Sachin Pilot	Indian National Congress
8	Alwar	Dr. Karan Singh Yadav	Indian National Congress
9	Bharatpur	Vishvendra Singh	Bharatiya Janata Party
10	Bayana	Ramswaroop Koli	Bharatiya Janata Party
11	Sawai Madhopur	Namo Narain Meena	Indian National Congress
12	Ajmer	Rasa Singh Rawat	Bharatiya Janata Party
13	Tonk	Kailash Meghwal	Bharatiya Janata Party
14	Kota	Raghuveer Singh Koshal	Bharatiya Janata Party
15	Jhalawar	Dushyant Singh	Bharatiya Janata Party
16	Banswara	Dhan Singh Rawat	Bharatiya Janata Party
17	Salumber	Mahaveer Bhagora	Bharatiya Janata Party
18	Udaipur	Kiran Maheshwari	Bharatiya Janata Party
19	Chittorgarh	Shrichand Kriplani	Bharatiya Janata Party
20	Bhilwara	Vijayendrapal Singh	Bharatiya Janata Party
21	Pali	Pusp Jain	Bharatiya Janata Party
22	Jalore	B. Susheela	Bharatiya Janata Party
23	Barmer	Manvendra Singh	Bharatiya Janata Party
24	Jodhpur	Jaswant Singh Bishnoi	Bharatiya Janata Party
25	Nagaur	Bhanwar Singh Dangawas	Bharatiya Janata Party

== 13th Lok Sabha ==
Keys; BJP (16) INC (9)

No.	Constituency	Name of elected M.P.	Party affiliation
1	Ganganagar (SC)	Nihalchand Chauhan	Bharatiya Janata Party
2	Bikaner	Rameshwar Dudi	Indian National Congress
3	Churu	Ram Singh Kaswan	Bharatiya Janata Party
4	Jhunjhunu	Sis Ram Ola	Indian National Congress
5	Sikar	Subhash Maharia	Bharatiya Janata Party
6	Jaipur	Girdhari Lal Bhargava	Bharatiya Janata Party
7	Dausa	Rajesh Pilot	Indian National Congress
8	Alwar	Jaswant Singh Yadav	Bharatiya Janata Party
9	Bharatpur	Vishvendra Singh	Bharatiya Janata Party
10	Bayana (SC)	Bahadur Singh Koli	Bharatiya Janata Party
11	Sawai Madhopur (ST)	Jaskaur Meena	Bharatiya Janata Party
12	Ajmer	Rasa Singh Rawat	Bharatiya Janata Party
13	Tonk (SC)	Shyam Lal Bansiwal	Bharatiya Janata Party
14	Kota	Raghuveer Singh Koshal	Bharatiya Janata Party
15	Jhalawar	Vasundhara Raje Scindia	Bharatiya Janata Party
16	Banswara (ST)	Tarachand Bhagora	Indian National Congress
17	Salumber (ST)	Bheru Lal Meena	Indian National Congress
18	Udaipur	Girija Vyas	Indian National Congress
19	Chittorgarh	Shrichand Kriplani	Bharatiya Janata Party
20	Bhilwara	Vijayendrapal Singh	Bharatiya Janata Party
21	Pali	Pusp Jain	Bharatiya Janata Party
22	Jalore (SC)	Sardar Buta Singh	Indian National Congress
23	Barmer	Sona Ram	Indian National Congress
24	Jodhpur	Jaswant Singh Bishnoi	Bharatiya Janata Party
25	Nagaur	Ram Raghunath Chaudhary	Indian National Congress

== 12th Lok Sabha ==
Sr.no.	Constituency	Member	Party
1	Ajmer	Prabha Thakur	Indian National Congress
2	Alwar	Ghasi Ram Yadav	Indian National Congress
3	Banswara (ST)	Mahendrajeet Singh Malviya	Indian National Congress
4	Barmer	Sona Ram	Indian National Congress
5	Bayana (SC)	Ganga Ram Koli	Bharatiya Janata Party
6	Bharatpur	K. Natwar Singh	Indian National Congress
7	Bhilwara	Rampal Upadhyaya	Indian National Congress
8	Bikaner	Dr. Bal Ram Jakhar	Indian National Congress
9	Chittorgarh	Udai Lal Anjana	Indian National Congress
10	Churu	Narendra Budania	Indian National Congress
11	Dausa (ST)	Rajesh Pilot	Indian National Congress
12	Ganganagar (SC)	Er. Shankar Pannu	Indian National Congress
13	Jaipur	Girdhari Lal Bhargava	Bharatiya Janata Party
14	Jalore (SC)	Sardar Buta Singh	Indian National Congress
15	Jhalawar	Vasundhara Raje	Bharatiya Janata Party
16	Jodhpur	Ashok Gehlot	Indian National Congress
17	Kota	Ram Narain Meena	Indian National Congress
18	Nagaur	Ram Raghunath Chaudhary	Indian National Congress
19	Pali	Mitha Lal Jain	Indian National Congress
20	Salumber (ST)	Bheru Lal Meena	Indian National Congress
21	Sawai Madhopur (ST)	Usha Meena	Indian National Congress
22	Sikar	Subhash Maharia	Bharatiya Janata Party
23	Tonk (SC)	Dowarka Parshad Bairwa	Indian National Congress
24	Udaipur	Shanti Lal Chaplot	Bharatiya Janata Party
25	Jhunjhunu	Sis Ram Ola	All India Indira Congress (Secular)

== 11th Lok Sabha ==
Constituency	Member	Party
Ajmer	Rasa Singh Rawat	Bharatiya Janata Party
Alwar	Nawal Kishore Sharma	Indian National Congress
Banswara (ST)	Tarachand Bhagora	Indian National Congress
Barmer	Sona Ram	Bharatiya Janata Party
Bayana (SC)	Ganga Ram Koli	Bharatiya Janata Party
Bharatpur	Maharani Divya Singh	Bharatiya Janata Party
Bhilwara	Subhash Baheria	Bharatiya Janata Party
Bikaner	Mahendra Singh Bhati	Bharatiya Janata Party
Chittorgarh	Dr.(Kum.) Girija Vyas	Indian National Congress
Churu	Narendra Budania	Indian National Congress
Dausa (ST)	Rajesh Pilot	Indian National Congress
Ganganagar (SC)	Nihalchand	Bharatiya Janata Party
Jaipur	Girdhari Lal Bhargav	Bharatiya Janata Party
Jalore (SC)	Parsaram Meghwal	Indian National Congress
Jhalawar	Vasundhara Raje	Bharatiya Janata Party
Jodhpur	Ashok Gehlot	Indian National Congress
Kota	Vaidya Dau Dayal Joshi	Bharatiya Janata Party
Nagaur	Bhanu Prakash Mirdha	Bharatiya Janata Party
Nagaur	Nathu Ram Mirdha	Indian National Congress
Pali	Gumanmal Lodha	Bharatiya Janata Party
Salumber (ST)	Bheru Lal Meena	Indian National Congress
Sawai Madhopur (ST)	Usha Meena	Indian National Congress
Sikar	Dr. Hari Singh	Indian National Congress
Tonk (SC)	Shyam Lal Bansiwal	Bharatiya Janata Party

== 10th Lok Sabha ==
Constituency	Member	Party
Ajmer	Rasa Singh Rawat	Bharatiya Janata Party
Alwar	Smt. Mahendra Kumari	Bharatiya Janata Party
Banswara (ST)	Prabhu Lal Rawat	Indian National Congress (I)
Barmer	Ram Niwas Mirdha	Indian National Congress (I)
Bayana (SC)	Ganga Ram Koli	Bharatiya Janata Party
Bharatpur	Smt. Krishnendra Kaur (Deepa)	Bharatiya Janata Party
Bhilwara	Shiv Charan Mathur	Indian National Congress (I)
Bikaner	Dr. Bal Ram Jakhar	Indian National Congress
Bikaner	Manphool Singh Bhadu Chaudhary	Indian National Congress (I)
Chittorgarh	Dr.(Kum.) Girija Vyas	Indian National Congress
Churu	Ram Singh Kaswan	Bharatiya Janata Party
Dausa (ST)	Rajesh Pilot	Indian National Congress
Ganganagar (SC)	Birbal Ram	Indian National Congress (I)
Jaipur	Girdhari Lal Bhargav	Bharatiya Janata Party
Jalore (SC)	Sardar Buta Singh	Indian National Congress
Jhalawar	Vasundhara Raje	Bharatiya Janata Party
Jhunjhunu	Mohd. Ayub Khan	Indian National Congress (I)
Jodhpur	Ashok Gehlot	Indian National Congress
Kota	Vaidya Dau Dayal Joshi	Bharatiya Janata Party
Nagaur	Nathu Ram Mirdha	Indian National Congress
Pali	Gumanmal Lodha	Bharatiya Janata Party
Salumber (ST)	Bheru Lal Meena	Indian National Congress
Sawai Madhopur (ST)	Kunji Lal Meena	Bharatiya Janata Party
Tonk (SC)	Ram Narain Berwa	Bharatiya Janata Party

== 9th Lok Sabha ==
Constituency	Member	Party
Ajmer	Rasa Singh Rawat	Bharatiya Janata Party
Alwar	Ramjilal Yadava	Janata Dal
Banswara (ST)	Heera Bhai	Janata Dal
Barmer	Kalyan Singh Kalvi	Janata Dal
Bayana (SC)	Than Singh Jatav	Bharatiya Janata Party
Bharatpur (SC)	Vishvendra Singh	Bharatiya Janata Party
Bhilwara	Hemendra Singh Banera	Janata Dal
Bikaner	Shopat Singh Makkasar	Communist Party of India (Marxist)
Chittorgarh	Mahendra Singh Mewar	Bharatiya Janata Party
Churu	Daulat Ram Saran	Janata Dal
Dausa	Nathu Singh	Bharatiya Janata Party
Ganganagar (SC)	Bega Ram Chauhan	Janata Dal
Jaipur	Girdhari Lal Bhargav	Bharatiya Janata Party
Jhalawar	Vasundhara Raje	Bharatiya Janata Party
Jhunjhunu	Ch. Jagdeep Dhankhar	Janata Dal
Kota	Vaidya Dau Dayal Joshi	Bharatiya Janata Party
Nagaur	Nathu Ram Mirdha	Indian National Congress
Pali	Gumanmal Lodha	Bharatiya Janata Party
Salumber (ST)	Nand Lal Meena	Bharatiya Janata Party
Sikar	Devi Lal	Janata Dal
Tonk (SC)	Gopal Pacherwal	Janata Dal
Tonk (SC)	Kailash Meghwal	Bharatiya Janata Party
Udaipur	Gulab Chand Kataria	Bharatiya Janata Party

== 8th Lok Sabha ==
Constituency	Member	Party
Ajmer	Vishnu Kumar Modi	Indian National Congress (I)
Alwar	Nawal Kishore Sharma	Indian National Congress
Alwar	Ram Singh Yadav	Indian National Congress (I)
Banswara (ST)	Prabhu Lal Rawat	Indian National Congress (I)
Barmer	Ram Niwas Mirdha	Indian National Congress (I)
Barmer	Virdhi Chand Jain	Indian National Congress (I)
Bayana (SC)	Lala Ram Ken	Indian National Congress (I)
Bharatpur	K. Natwar Singh	Indian National Congress
Bhilwara	Girdhari Lal Vyas	Indian National Congress (I)
Bikaner	Dr. Bal Ram Jakhar	Indian National Congress
Bikaner	Manphool Singh Bhadu Chaudhary	Indian National Congress (I)
Chittorgarh	Prof. Nirmla Kumari Shaktawat	Indian National Congress (I)
Churu	Mohar Singh Rathore	Indian National Congress (I)
Churu	Narendra Budania	Indian National Congress
Dausa (ST)	Rajesh Pilot	Indian National Congress
Ganganagar (SC)	Birbal Ram	Indian National Congress (I)
Jalore (SC)	Sardar Buta Singh	Indian National Congress
Jhalawar	Jujhar Singh	Indian National Congress (I)
Jhunjhunu	Mohd. Ayub Khan	Indian National Congress (I)
Jodhpur	Chandresh Kumari Katoch	Indian National Congress
Jodhpur	Ashok Gehlot	Indian National Congress
Kota	Shanti Kumar Dhariwal	Indian National Congress (I)
Pali	Mool Chand Daga	Indian National Congress (I)
Pali	Shankar Lal	Indian National Congress (I)
Salumber (ST)	Alkha Ram	Indian National Congress (I)
Sawai Madhopur (ST)	Ram Kumar Meena	Indian National Congress (I)
Tonk (SC)	Banwari Lal Bairwa	Indian National Congress (I)
Udaipur	Indubala Sukhadia	Indian National Congress (I)
Sikar	Dr. Balram Jakhar	Indian National Congress (I)

== 7th Lok Sabha ==
Constituency	Member	Party
Ajmer	Bhagwan Dev Acharya	Indian National Congress (I)
Alwar	Nawal Kishore Sharma	Indian National Congress
Alwar	Ram Singh Yadav	Indian National Congress (I)
Banswara (ST)	Bheekhabhai	Indian National Congress (I)
Barmer	Virdhi Chand Jain	Indian National Congress (I)
Bayana (SC)	Jagannath Pahadia	Indian National Congress (I)
Bayana (SC)	Lala Ram Ken	Indian National Congress (I)
Bhilwara	Girdhari Lal Vyas	Indian National Congress (I)
Bikaner	Dr. Bal Ram Jakhar	Indian National Congress
Bikaner	Manphool Singh Bhadu Chaudhary	Indian National Congress (I)
Chittorgarh	Prof. Nirmla Kumari Shaktawat	Indian National Congress (I)
Churu	Daulat Ram Saran	Janata Dal
Dausa (ST)	Rajesh Pilot	Indian National Congress
Ganganagar (SC)	Birbal Ram	Indian National Congress (I)
Jaipur	Satish Chandra Agarwal	Janata Party
Jalore (SC)	Sardar Buta Singh	Indian National Congress
Jalore (SC)	Virda Ram Phulwariya	Indian National Congress (I)
Jhalawar	Chaturbhuj	Janata Party
Jhunjhunu	Bhim Singh	Janata Party
Jodhpur	Ashok Gehlot	Indian National Congress
Kota	Krishna Kumar Goyal	Janata Party
Nagaur	Nathu Ram Mirdha	Indian National Congress
Pali	Mool Chand Daga	Indian National Congress (I)
Salumber (ST)	Jai Narain Roat	Indian National Congress (I)
Sawai Madhopur (ST)	Ram Kumar Meena	Indian National Congress (I)
Sikar	Devi Lal	Janata Dal
Sikar	Kumbha Ram Arya	Janata Party (S)
Tonk (SC)	Banwari Lal Bairwa	Indian National Congress (I)
Udaipur	Deen Bandhu Verma	Indian National Congress (I)
Udaipur	Mohan Lal Sukhadia	Indian National Congress (I)

== 6th Lok Sabha ==
Constituency	Member	Party
Ajmer	Shrikaran Sharda	Janata Party
Alwar	Ramjilal Yadava	Janata Dal
Banswara (ST)	Heera Bhai	Janata Dal
Barmer	Tansingh	Janata Party
Bayana (SC)	Shyam Sunder Lal	Janata Party
Bharatpur	Ram Kishan	Janata Party
Bhilwara	Rooplal Somani	Janata Party
Bikaner	Chaudhry Hari Ram Makkasar Godara	Janata Party
Chittorgarh	Shyam Sunder Somani	Janata Party
Churu	Daulat Ram Saran	Janata Dal
Dausa	Nathu Singh	Bharatiya Janata Party
Ganganagar (SC)	Bega Ram Chauhan	Janata Dal
Jaipur	Satish Chandra Agarwal	Bharatiya Janata Party
Jalore (SC)	Hukam Ram	Janata Party
Jhalawar	Chaturbhuj	Janata Party
Jhunjhunu	Kanhaiyalal Mahla	Janata Party
Jodhpur	Ranchhor Das Gattani	Janata Party
Kota	Krishna Kumar Goyal	Bharatiya Janata Party
Nagaur	Nathu Ram Mirdha	Indian National Congress
Pali	Amrit Nahata	Janata Party
Salumber (ST)	Meena Laljibhai	Janata Party
Sawai Madhopur (ST)	Meetha Lal Patel	Janata Party
Sikar	Jagdish Prasad Mathur	Janata Party
Tonk (SC)	Ram Kanwar Berwa	Janata Party
Udaipur	Bhanu Kumar Shastri	Janata Party

== 5th Lok Sabha ==
Constituency	Member	Party
Ajmer	Bashweshwar Nath Bhargava	Indian National Congress
Alwar	Dr. Hari Prasad Sharma	Indian National Congress
Alwar	Nawal Kishore Sharma	Indian National Congress
Banswara (ST)	Hira Lal Doda	Indian National Congress
Bayana (SC)	Jagannath Pahadia	Indian National Congress (I)
Bharatpur	Raj Bahadur	Indian National Congress
Bhilwara	Hemendra Singh Banera	Jana Sangh
Bikaner	Karni Singh	Independent
Chittorgarh	Bishwanath Jhunjhunwala	Bharatiya Jan Sangh
Ganganagar (SC)	Pannalal Barupal	Indian National Congress
Jaipur	Rajmata of Jaipur Gayatri Devi	Swatantra Party
Jalore (SC)	Narendra Kumar Sanghi	Indian National Congress
Jalore (SC)	Sardar Buta Singh	Indian National Congress
Jhalawar	Brijraj Singh	Bharatiya Jan Sangh
Jhunjhunu	Shiv Nath Singh	Indian National Congress
Jodhpur	Rajmata(Jodhpur) Krishna Kumari	Independent
Kota	Onkarlal Berwa	Bharatiya Jan Sangh
Nagaur	Nathu Ram Mirdha	Indian National Congress
Pali	Mool Chand Daga	Indian National Congress (I)
Sawai Madhopur (ST)	Chhutten Lal	Indian National Congress
Sikar	Shrikrishan Modi	Indian National Congress
Tonk (SC)	Ram Kanwar Bairwa	Swatantra Party

== 4th Lok Sabha ==
Constituency	Member	Party
Ajmer	Bashweshwar Nath Bhargava	Indian National Congress
Alwar	Bholanath Master	Indian National Congress
Alwar	Nawal Kishore Sharma	Indian National Congress
Banswara (ST)	Heerji Bhai	Indian National Congress
Bayana (SC)	Jagannath Pahadia	Indian National Congress (I)
Bharatpur	Maharaja Brijendra Singh	Independent
Bhilwara	Ramesh Chandra Vyas	Indian National Congress
Bikaner	Karni Singh	Independent
Chittorgarh	Onkarlal Bohra	Indian National Congress
Dausa	Charanjit Rai	Swatantra Party
Ganganagar (SC)	Pannalal Barupal	Indian National Congress
Jaipur	Rajmata of Jaipur Gayatri Devi	Swatantra Party
Jalore (SC)	D.N. Patodia	Swatantra Party
Jhalawar	Brijraj Singh	Bharatiya Jan Sangh
Jhunjhunu	R.K. Birla	Swatantra Party
Kota	Onkarlal Berwa	Bharatiya Jan Sangh
Nagaur	N.K. Somani	Swatantra Party
Pali	Surendra Kumar Tapuriah	Swatantra Party
Sawai Madhopur (ST)	Meetha Lal Meena	Swatantra Party
Sikar	Saboo Gopal	Bharatiya Jan Sangh
Tonk (SC)	Jamna Lal Barwa	Swatantra Party
Udaipur	Dhuleshwar Meena	Indian National Congress

== 3rd Lok Sabha ==
Constituency	Member	Party
Ajmer	Mukat Behari Lal Bhargava	Indian National Congress
Alwar	Kashi Ram Gupta	Independent
Banswara (ST)	Ratan Lal	Indian National Congress
Barmer	Tansingh	RRP
Bharatpur	Raj Bahadur	Indian National Congress
Bhilwara	Dr. Kalu Lal Shrimali	Indian National Congress
Bhilwara	Shiv Charan Mathur	Indian National Congress (I)
Bikaner	Karni Singh	Independent
Chittorgarh	Manikya Lal Verma	Indian National Congress
Dausa	Prithvi Raj	Swatantra Party
Ganganagar (SC)	Pannalal Barupal	Indian National Congress
Hindaun (SC)	Tika Ram Paliwal	Indian National Congress
Jaipur	Rajmata of Jaipur Gayatri Devi	Swatantra Party
Jalore (SC)	Harish Chandra Mathur	Indian National Congress
Jhalawar	Brijraj Singh	Congress
Jhunjhunu	Radheshyam Ramkumar Morarka	Indian National Congress
Jodhpur	Dr. Laxmi Mal Singhvi	Independent
Kota	Onkarlal Berwa	Bharatiya Jan Sangh
Nagaur	S. K. Dey	Indian National Congress
Pali	Jaswantraj Mehta	Indian National Congress
Sawai Madhopur (ST)	Kesar Lal	Swatantra Party
Sikar	Rameshwar Tantia	Indian National Congress
Udaipur	Dhuleshwar Meena	Indian National Congress

== 2nd Lok Sabha ==
Constituency	Member	Party
Ajmer	Mukat Behari Lal Bhargava	Indian National Congress
Alwar	Shobha Ram Kumawat	Indian National Congress
Banswara (ST)	Bhogji	Indian National Congress
Barmer	Capt. Maharawal Raghunath Singh	Independent
Bayana (SC)	Jagannath Pahadia	Indian National Congress (I)
Bharatpur	Raj Bahadur	Indian National Congress
Bhilwara	Ramesh Chandra Vyas	Indian National Congress
Bikaner	Karni Singh	Independent
Chittorgarh	Manikya Lal Verma	Indian National Congress
Dausa	Gajadhar Hajarilal Somani	Indian National Congress
Ganganagar (SC)	Pannalal Barupal	Indian National Congress
Jaipur	Harish Chandra Sharma	Independent
Jalore (SC)	Harish Chandra Mathur	Indian National Congress
Jalore (SC)	Narendra Kumar Sanghi	Indian National Congress
Jhunjhunu	Radheshyam Ramkumar Morarka	Indian National Congress
Kota	Nemi Chandra Kasliwal	Indian National Congress
Kota	Onkar Lal Chauhan	Indian National Congress
Nagaur	Mathuradas Mathur	Indian National Congress
Pali	Jaswantraj Mehta	Indian National Congress
Sawai Madhopur (ST)	Pandit Hiralal Shastri	Indian National Congress
Sikar	Rameshwar Tantia	Indian National Congress
Udaipur	Deenbandhu Parmar	Indian National Congress

== 1st Lok Sabha ==
Rajasthan was formed officially on 30 March 1949

Key
INC (2)

No.	Constituency	Member of Parliament	Party affiliation
1	Ajmer North	Jwala Prasad	Indian National Congress
2	Ajmer South	Mukat Behari Lal Bhargava	Indian National Congress

=== Key Members ===
Constituency	Member	Party
Alwar	Shobha Ram	Indian National Congress
Banswara–Dungarpur (ST)	Bheekha Bhai	Indian National Congress
Barmer–Jalore	Bhawani Singh	Independent
Bharatpur–Sawai Madhopur	Girraj Saran Singh	Independent
Bharatpur–Sawai Madhopur	Manik Chand Jatav-Vir (SC)	Krishikar Lok Party
Bhilwara	Hari Ram Nathany	Ram Rajya Parishad
Bikaner–Churu	Karni Singh	Independent
Chittor	U. M. Trivedi	Bharatiya Jana Sangh
Ganganagar–Jhunjhunu	Radheshyam Ramkumar Morarka	Indian National Congress
Ganganagar–Jhunjhunu	Pannalal Barupal (SC)	Indian National Congress
Jaipur	Bansilal Lohadia	Independent
Jaipur–Sawai Madhopur	Raj Bahadur	Indian National Congress
Jodhpur	Jaswantraj Mehta	Independent
Kota–Bundi	Raj Chandra Sen	Ram Rajya Parishad
Kota–Jhalawar	Nemi Chandra Kasliwal	Indian National Congress
Nagaur–Pali	G. D. Somani	Independent
Sikar	Nand Lal Sharma	Ram Rajya Parishad
Sirohi–Pali	Ajit Singh	Independent
Tonk	Manikya Lal Verma	Indian National Congress
Udaipur	B. S. Mehta	Indian National Congress
