= Jaipur Lok Sabha constituency =

Lok Sabha Constituency in Rajasthan, India

Coordinates: 26.90°N 75.79°E

Jaipur
- Lok Sabha constituency
- Interactive Map Outlining Jaipur Lok Sabha Constituency

Constituency details
- Country: India
- Region: North India
- State: Rajasthan
- Assembly constituencies: Hawa Mahal; Vidhyadhar Nagar; Civil Lines; Kishanpole; Adarsh Nagar; Malviya Nagar; Sanganer; Bagru
- Established: 1952
- Reservation: None

Member of Parliament
- 18th Lok Sabha
- Incumbent Manju Sharma
- Party: Bharatiya Janata Party
- Elected year: 2024

Jaipur is No. 7 Among Constituencies of Rajasthan

Jaipur (Hindi pronunciation: [d͡ʒəj.pʊɾ]) is one of the 25 Lok Sabha (parliamentary) constituencies in the Indian state of Rajasthan. It comprises the city of Jaipur and parts of Sanganer tehsil, both in Jaipur district. It was established in 1952 and as of 2024, it is represented by Manju Sharma of the Bharatiya Janata Party.

== Assembly segments ==
Presently, Jaipur Lok Sabha constituency comprises eight Vidhan Sabha (legislative assembly) segments.

#	Name	District	MLA	Party	2024 Lead
49	Hawa Mahal	Jaipur	Balmukund Acharya	BJP	INC
50	Vidhyadhar Nagar	Jaipur	Diya Kumari	BJP	BJP
51	Civil Lines	Jaipur	Gopal Sharma	BJP	BJP
52	Kishanpole	Jaipur	Aminuddin Kagzi	INC	INC
53	Adarsh Nagar	Jaipur	Rafeek Khan	INC	INC
54	Malviya Nagar	Jaipur	Kali Charan Saraf	BJP	BJP
55	Sanganer	Jaipur	Bhajan Lal Sharma	BJP	BJP
56	Bagru (SC)	Jaipur	Kailash Chand Verma	BJP	BJP

== Members of Parliament ==
Year	Member	Party
1952	Daulat Mal Bhandari	Indian National Congress
1957	Harish Chandra Sharma	Independent
1962	Maharani Gayatri Devi	Swatantra Party
1967	Maharani Gayatri Devi	Swatantra Party
1971	Maharani Gayatri Devi	Swatantra Party
1977	Satish Chandra Agarwal	Janata Party
1980	Satish Chandra Agarwal	Janata Party
1984	Nawal Kishore Sharma	Indian National Congress
1989	Girdhari Lal Bhargava	Bharatiya Janata Party
1991	Girdhari Lal Bhargava	Bharatiya Janata Party
1996	Girdhari Lal Bhargava	Bharatiya Janata Party
1998	Girdhari Lal Bhargava	Bharatiya Janata Party
1999	Girdhari Lal Bhargava	Bharatiya Janata Party
2004	Girdhari Lal Bhargava	Bharatiya Janata Party
2009	Mahesh Joshi	Indian National Congress
2014	Ramcharan Bohra	Bharatiya Janata Party
2019	Ramcharan Bohra	Bharatiya Janata Party
2024	Manju Sharma	Bharatiya Janata Party

== Election results ==
=== 2024 ===
2024 Indian general election: Jaipur
Party	Candidate	Votes	%	±%
BJP	Manju Sharma	886,850	60.67	▼2.78
INC	Pratap Singh Khachariyawas	555,083	37.93	▲4.05
BSP	Rajesh Tanwar	3,461	0.23	▼0.31
RRP	Shashank Singh Arya	393	0.03	New
NOTA	None of the above	10,428	0.71	▲0.26
Majority		331,761	22.74	▼6.83
Turnout		1,463,258	63.38	▼5.1
BJP hold		Swing		

=== 2019 results ===
2019 Indian general elections: Jaipur
Party	Candidate	Votes	%	±%
BJP	Ramcharan Bohra	924,065	63.45	▼3.02
INC	Jyoti Khandelwal	4,93,439	33.88	▲8.94
BSP	Umrao Salodia	7,867	0.54	▲0.14
NOTA	None of the Above	6,522	0.45	▼0.19
Independent	Babita wadhwani	265	0.05	N/A
Majority		430,626	29.57	▼11.96
Turnout		1,456,506	68.48	▲2.24
BJP hold		Swing		

=== 2014 results ===
2014 Indian general elections: Jaipur
Party	Candidate	Votes	%	±%
BJP	Ramcharan Bohra	863,358	66.47	▲19.56
INC	Dr. Mahesh Joshi	324,013	24.94	▼23.95
AAP	Dr. Virendra Singh	55,118	4.24	−
CPI	Dev Krishan Chhangani	15,597	1.20	−
BSP	Farooq Shah	5,193	0.40	▼0.41
NOTA	None of the Above	8,345	0.64	−
Majority		539,345	41.53	▲39.55
Turnout		1,296,806	66.24	▲17.98
BJP gain from INC		Swing	▲17.58	

=== 2009 results ===
2009 Indian general elections: Jaipur
Party	Candidate	Votes	%	±%
INC	Dr. Mahesh Joshi	3,97,438	48.89	+6.49
BJP	Ghanshyam Tiwari	3,81,339	46.91	−7.65
BSP	Vijay Peshwani	6,591	0.81	−0.02
Independent	Ramesh Chandra	6,222	0.77	
Independent	Mohammad Rafiq	3,503	0.43	
Independent	Raj Kumar	3,319	0.41	
Independent	Sita Ram Bairwa	1,794	0.22	
Independent	Manav	1,585	0.19	
Jago Party	Hargovind Singh	1,455	0.18	
Independent	Ram Lal Danka	901	0.11	
Independent	Kailash Chand Saini s/o Sundar Lal Saini	794	0.10	
Independent	Dr Sat Dev Nath Chadda	785	0.10	
Independent	Bhaskar Daagar	678	0.08	
Independent	Kailash Chand Saini s/o Gangaram Saini	668	0.08	
RJVP	Nihal Chand	632	0.08	
Independent	Prem Saini Alias Premnath	585	0.07	
Independent	Riyajul Hasan	574	0.07	
Independent	Bhanwar Kumar Rajawat	573	0.07	
RBD	Shyam Lal Vijay	561	0.07	
Independent	Dr Avinash Vishnoi	513	0.06	
Independent	Vijaypal Singh Shyoran (Vivek)	511	0.06	
Independent	Sanjay Goel	502	0.06	
Independent	Abdul Rajak	485	0.06	
Independent	Rohitash Kuldeep Raigar	483	0.06	
Independent	Iqbal	410	0.05	
Majority		16,099	1.98	−10.18
Turnout		8,12,901	48.26	+1.81
INC gain from BJP		Swing	+6.49	

=== 2004 results ===
General Election, 2004: Jaipur
Party	Candidate	Votes	%	±%
BJP	Girdhari Lal Bhargava	4,80,730	54.56	−1.94
INC	Pratap Singh Khachariawas	3,73,544	42.4	+3.04
Independent	Vijay Rao	8,885	1.01	
BSP	O P Barwadia	7,310	0.83	
Independent	Monu Kuruvila	3,414	0.39	
Independent	Bhag Chand Jain	1,491	0.17	
RLD	Mahendra Pratap Singh	1,371	0.16	
SP	Indrajeet Singh	1,251	0.14	−0.12
Independent	Avinash Rai	877	0.10	
Independent	Prabhu Devi Soyal	807	0.09	
Independent	Iftkhar	732	0.08	
Samata Party	Om Prakash Kedawat	663	0.07	
Majority		1,07,186	12.16	−5.38
Turnout		8,81,075	46.45	+0.34
BJP hold		Swing	-1.94	

=== 1999 results ===
General Election, 1999: Jaipur
Party	Candidate	Votes	%	±%
BJP	Girdhari Lal Bhargava	456,720	56.50	+0.07
INC	Pt. Raghu Sharma	314,930	38.96	+0.13
Independent	Sandip Saxena	13,074	1.62	
CPI	Sunita Chaturvedi	8,507	1.05	−0.72
JD(S)	Ram Chandar Choudhary	5,314	0.66	
CPI(ML)L	Srilata Swaminathan	4,226	0.52	
SP	Sua Lal Yadav	2,120	0.26	+0.07
Lok Shakti	Ramesh Chand Sharma	2,014	0.25	
MKSD	Karuna Das Kabir Panthi	1,517	0.19	
Majority		141,790	17.54	−0.06
Turnout		808,422	46.11	−3.19
BJP hold		Swing	+0.07	

=== 1998 results ===
General Election, 1998: Jaipur
Party	Candidate	Votes	%	±%
BJP	Girdhari Lal Bhargava	4,45,608	56.43	+1.83
INC	M Sayeed Khan	3,06,637	38.83	−2.47
CPI	Sunita Chaturvedi	13,966	1.77	
JD	Vijay Singh Puniya	6,320	0.80	−0.04
BSP	Radhe Shyam Saini	4,014	0.51	
Golden India Party	P C Lunia	2,710	0.34	
Independent	Shravan Soni	2,129	0.27	+0.20
Samata Party	Ganesh Saini	1,913	0.24	+0.11
SS	Dileep Singh Beniwal	1,894	0.24	−0.08
SP	Aruna Gaur	1,496	0.19	−0.10
Independent	Harishankar Bairwa	1,071	0.14	
Independent	Md. Iftekhar Kureshi	942	0.12	
Independent	Natwar Lal Jain	897	0.11	
Majority		1,38,971	17.60	−0.64
Turnout		789,597	49.30	+10.69
BJP hold		Swing	+1.83	

=== 1996 results ===
General Election, 1996: Jaipur
Party	Candidate	Votes	%	±%
BJP	Girdhari Lal Bhargava	3,44,994	54.60	−4.43
INC	Pt. Dinesh Chandra Swami	2,29,740	36.36	+0.15
Independent	K C Bakodia	12,841	2.03	
JD	Manjula Kaushik	5,319	0.84	−0.37
Independent	Rajesh Tanwar	3,683	0.58	
Independent	Satya Narain Sharma	3,106	0.49	
Independent	Mangal Chand	2,855	0.45	
Independent	Heera Lal Jain	2,748	0.43	
Independent	Tej Singh Raghav	2,477	0.39	
Independent	Hemant Kumar Kothari	2,306	0.36	
SS	Dilip Singh Beniwal	1,994	0.32	
SP	Harnam Singh Sikarwar	1,842	0.29	−0.36
Independent	Fateh Chand Agnani	1,130	0.18	
Independent	Bhairu Lal Phariwal	1,086	0.17	
Independent	Har Nath	994	0.16	
Independent	Devidas Pamnani	928	0.15	+0.04
Samata Party	Chandra Mehta	825	0.13	
Independent	Ram Chandra Gautam	819	0.13	
Independent	Sardar Surendra Singh Gular	743	0.12	
Independent	Mahaveer Prasad	702	0.11	
Independent	Masrur Khan	647	0.10	
Independent	Ajay Singh Chauhan	624	0.10	
Independent	Bhagwan Das Parashar	616	0.10	
Independent	Rati Ram Vashishta	585	0.09	
Independent	Om Prakash Sharma	569	0.09	−0.09
Independent	Rajiv Sharma	539	0.09	
Independent	Laxmi Narain Meena	529	0.08	
Independent	Mohammed Akram Khan	502	0.08	
Independent	Bhawani Shankar Kumawat	486	0.08	
Independent	Tara Chand Ajmera	463	0.07	
Independent	Gajanand Soni	446	0.07	+0.05
Independent	Shravan Soni	418	0.07	
Independent	Anil Kumar Singhvi	349	0.06	
Independent	Rajendra Prasad Sharma	332	0.05	
Independent	Amar Singh Prajapat	331	0.05	
Independent	Hoshiyar Singh	318	0.05	
Independent	Satya Narain Sharma	317	0.05	
Independent	Sanwar Lal Sharma	308	0.05	
Akhil Bharatiya Jan Sangh	Naveen Chandra Saxena	304	0.05	
Independent	Chianji Lal Tiwari	299	0.05	
Independent	Ramesh Chand Gupta	275	0.04	
Independent	Suresh Gupta	262	0.04	
PSSS	M P Jain	256	0.04	
Independent	Narain das Gandhi	255	0.04	
Independent	Pradeep Kumar Tank	234	0.04	
Independent	Devendra Garg	197	0.03	
Independent	Bhagirath Singh Kharante	161	0.03	
Independent	Parmanand Salodia	144	0.02	
Independent	Rajveer Dewas	56	0.01	
Majority		1,15,254	18.24	−4.58
Turnout		6,31,898	38.61	−2.97
BJP hold		Swing	-4.43	

=== 1991 results ===
General Election, 1991: Jaipur
Party	Candidate	Votes	%	±%
BJP	Girdhari Lal Bhargava	3,25,668	59.03	+4.78
INC	Nawal Kishore Sharma	1,99,741	36.21	−6.11
JD	Raghuveer Singh Shekhawat	6,684	1.21	
SP	Mehboob	3,575	0.65	
JP	Devendra Kumar Lunawat	3,021	0.55	+0.27
Independent	Girdhari Lal	1,638	0.30	
AHF	Anand Sharma	1,631	0.30	
Independent	Sanjay Kumar Shrama	1,165	0.21	
Independent	Om Prakash Sharma	999	0.18	
Doordarshi Party	Deepak Sharma	890	0.16	−0.44
Independent	Pt. Nawal Kishore Sharma	769	0.14	
Independent	Devidas Pamnani	629	0.11	
LKD	Baboo Lal	563	0.10	
Independent	Bhola Ram	553	0.10	
Independent	Bhairumal Tekchandani	490	0.09	
Independent	Natwarlal Jain	403	0.07	
Independent	Umendra Dadheech	348	0.06	
Independent	Deewan	316	0.06	−0.13
Independent	Ganga SIngh	281	0.05	
Independent	Bindalji Shiv Prasad	279	0.05	−0.04
Independent	Madhvendra Kumar Sharma	261	0.05	
Mukt Bharat	Netaji Surendra Mohan Nayar	251	0.05	
Independent	Shiv Narain Valmiki	242	0.04	−0.02
Independent	Premanand Salodiya	208	0.04	
AIFB	Rameshwar Prasad Maheshwari	185	0.03	
Independent	Lokesh Jain	178	0.03	
Independent	Ved Prakash	155	0.03	
Independent	Gajanand Soni	112	0.02	−0.06
Independent	Prahlad	109	0.02	
Independent	S N Puri	98	0.02	
Independent	Shanti Lal Khichi	87	0.02	
Independent	Ahmed Bakhsh	83	0.02	
Independent	Chachachichacha	66	0.01	
Majority		1,25,927	22.82	+10.89
Turnout		5,51,678	41.58	−17.21
BJP hold		Swing	+4.78	

=== 1989 results ===
General Election, 1989: Jaipur
Party	Candidate	Votes	%	±%
BJP	Girdhari Lal Bhargava	3,84,125	54.25	+15.13
INC	Bhawani Singh	2,99,638	42.32	−13.49
Independent	Chittaranjan Sharma	5,057	0.71	
Doordarshi Party	Deepak Sharma	4,216	0.60	
Independent	Rehaman Ali	2,784	0.39	
Independent	Manoj Kumar Vakil	2,660	0.38	
JP	Jagdish Prasad Gurjar	1,990	0.28	
BSP	Kanhaiyalal Sonwal	1,774	0.25	
Independent	Deewan	1,356	0.19	
Independent	Mathura Prasad	858	0.12	
Independent	Dwaraka Prasad Gupta	756	0.11	
Independent	Bindalji Shiv Prasad	666	0.09	−0.22
Independent	Gajananad Soni	565	0.08	−0.05
Independent	Shiv Narayan Valmiki	458	0.06	−0.16
Independent	Harnarayan Baxi	428	0.06	
Independent	Fateh Lal	366	0.05	
Independent	Ramavtar Sharma	361	0.05	
Majority		84,493	11.93	−4.76
Turnout		7,08,058	58.79	+0.04
BJP gain from INC(I)		Swing	+15.13	

=== 1984 results ===
General Election, 1984: Jaipur
Party	Candidate	Votes	%	±%
INC(I)	Nawal Kishore Sharma	2,80,436	55.81	+12.53
BJP	Satish Chandra Agrawal	1,96,579	39.12	
Independent	Vishnu Deo Chopra	3,962	0.69	
JP	Vimal Choudhary	3,712	0.74	−43.87
Independent	Deewan Dhobi	1,975	0.39	
IC(S)	Prem Chand Jain	1,912	0.38	
Independent	Rajendra Nolathia	1,577	0.31	
Independent	Bindalji Shiv Prasad	1,547	0.31	−0.13
INC(J)	Shiv Narayan Valmiki	1,111	0.22	
Independent	Bhag Chand Ajmera	1,104	0.22	
Independent	Mahal Chand Sharma	989	0.20	
Independent	Jawahar Singh Neta	864	0.17	
Independent	Bal Krishna Khurana	720	0.14	
Independent	Gajanand Soni	665	0.13	
Independent	Sudhir Boda Susu	531	0.11	
Independent	Bhanwar Lal Kumawat	500	0.10	
Independent	Narayan Das Gandhi	483	0.10	
Independent	Ashok Bairathi	457	0.09	
Independent	Bindu KUmar Dadich	429	0.09	
Independent	Sheo Ram Meena	408	0.08	
Independent	Meera Patodia	355	0.07	
Independent	Ram Pratap Purohit	343	0.07	
Independent	Sansar Chandra	331	0.07	
Independent	Laxminarayan Lotterywala	318	0.06	
Independent	Suran Narain Agarwal	268	0.05	
Independent	Haseen Ahmed Hashmi	267	0.05	
Independent	Ramgopal Vijaivargiya	256	0.05	
Independent	Gordhan Gyanani	232	0.05	
Independent	Ratan Kumar Derolia	162	0.03	
Majority		83,857	16.69	+15.46
Turnout		5,02,493	58.75	+5.74
INC(I) gain from JP		Swing	+12.53	

=== 1980 results ===
General Election, 1980: Jaipur
Party	Candidate	Votes	%	±%
JP	Satish Chandra Agrawal	170,406	44.61	▼26.32
INC	Dinesh Chandra Swami	1,65,722	43.38	▲26.35
JP(S)	Abdul Hai Faiz	28,317	7.41	New
RRP	Acharya Nand Lal Sharma	3,938	1.03	N/A
Independent	Pt. Laxmi Narayan Latriwala	2,567	0.67	N/A
Independent	Ramu Sahariya	1,752	0.46	N/A
Independent	Bindalji Shiv Prasad	1,686	0.44	N/A
Independent	Gaja Nand Soni	1,546	0.40	N/A
Independent	Tola Ram	1,381	0.36	N/A
Independent	Krishna Kumar Swami	1,290	0.34	N/A
BSP	Laxmi Chand Bajaj	1,278	0.33	N/A
Independent	Ratan Lal Somani	948	0.25	N/A
Independent	Subhash Chandra Haryana	702	0.18	N/A
Independent	Fateh Lal	494	0.13	N/A
Majority		4,684	1.23	▼36.89
Turnout		3,82,031	53.04	▼5.63
JP hold		Swing		

=== 1977 results ===
General Election, 1977: Jaipur
Party	Candidate	Votes	%	±%
JP	Satish Chandra Agrawal	249,367	70.93	New
INC	Janardhan Singh	59,885	17.03	▼23.28
IUML	Moinuddin	26,720	7.60	N/A
CPI(M)	Mohan Punamiya	7,527	2.14	N/A
Independent	Ram Narain	2,310	0.66	▲0.41
Independent	Rameshwar Prasad Meena	2,115	0.60	N/A
Independent	Prem Chand	1,731	0.49	N/A
Independent	Laxmi Narayan Kalal Sethi	1,131	0.32	N/A
Independent	Haji Muhammed Imamuddin	783	0.22	N/A
Majority		1,89,482	53.90	▲38.12
Turnout		3,51,569	58.67	▲3.16
JP gain from SWA		Swing		

=== 1971 results ===
General Election, 1971: Jaipur
Party	Candidate	Votes	%	±%
SWA	Gayatri Devi	180,059	56.09	▼7.92
INC	P K Choudhary	129,415	40.31	▲6.94
Socialist	Laxmi Narain	3,434	1.07	N/A
Independent	Bharat Singh	2,526	0.79	N/A
Independent	Onkar Mal	2,108	0.66	N/A
Independent	Mohd Seh Khan	1,624	0.51	N/A
Independent	Ram Narain	814	0.25	N/A
Independent	Immamudden	614	0.19	N/A
Independent	Wazid Ali Khan	416	0.13	N/A
Majority		50,644	15.78	▼14.86
Turnout		321,010	55.51	▼3.08
SWA hold		Swing	▼7.92	

=== 1967 results ===
General Election, 1967: Jaipur
Party	Candidate	Votes	%	±%
SWA	Gayatri Devi	196,892	64.01	▼13.07
INC	R Kasliwal	102,641	33.37	▲19.30
PSP	R Chander	5,605	1.82	N/A
Independent	V Prakash	2,481	0.81	N/A
Majority		94,251	30.64	▼22.37
Turnout		307,619	58.59	▲0.34
SWA hold		Swing	▼13.07	

=== 1962 results ===
General Election, 1962: Jaipur
Party	Candidate	Votes	%	±%
SWA	Gayatri Devi	192,909	77.08	New
INC	Sharda Devi	35,217	14.07	▼34.02
Independent	Vidhya Vibha	6,123	2.45	N/A
Independent	Ram Singh	3,756	1.50	N/A
CPI	Khyali Ram	2,969	1.19	N/A
RRP	Raghunath Sahai	2,430	0.97	N/A
Independent	Gayatri Devi w/o Ladu Ram	2,141	0.86	N/A
Independent	Ram Pal	1,467	0.59	N/A
Socialist	Dharmendra Nath	1,358	0.54	N/A
Independent	Gulabchand Kala	1,147	0.46	N/A
Independent	H. A. Jinda	755	0.30	N/A
Majority		157,692	63.01	▲59.19
Turnout		250,272	55.67	▲24.84
SWA gain from Independent		Swing		

=== 1957 results ===
General Election, 1957: Jaipur
Party	Candidate	Votes	%	±%
Independent	Harish Chandra Sharma	61,270	51.91	N/A
INC	Sadiq Ali	56,766	48.09	▲6.30
Majority		4,504	3.82	▼7.75
Turnout		118,036	30.83	▲0.90
Independent gain from INC		Swing		

=== 1952 results ===
General Election, 1952: Jaipur
Party	Candidate	Votes	%	±%
INC	Daulat Mal	49,773	41.79	
Independent	Chiranji Lal	35,989	30.22	
RRP	Sardar Muhammad Khan	10,942	9.19	
Independent	Acharya Nand Lal	9,317	7.82	
CPI	Radha Ballabh	5,490	4.61	
PSP	Shanti Bhai Johri	4,124	3.46	
Independent	Radhe Shyam	3,459	2.90	
Majority		13,784	11.57	
Turnout		1,19,094	29.93	
INC win (new seat)				

== See also ==
- Jaipur district
- List of constituencies of the Lok Sabha
