= Jaipur Municipal Corporation =

Local civic body in Jaipur, Rajasthan, India

Jaipur Municipal Corporation Jayapur Nagar Nigam
- Emblem of Jaipur Municipal Corporation

Type
- Type: Municipal Corporation of the Jaipur

History
- Founded: 1888; 138 years ago

Leadership
- Mayor: Sunil Kothari Politician, BJP since September 2026
- Deputy Mayor: Saroj Kanwar, BJP

Structure
- Political groups: Government (89): BJP (78); IND (11); Opposition (61): INC (57); IND (4)

Elections
- Last election: 2026
- Next election: 2031

Website
- Jaipur Municipal Corporation

Jaipur Municipal Corporation (JMC) is municipal corporation of Jaipur city in Rajasthan state in India. Jaipur Municipal Corporation is responsible for maintaining the city's civic infrastructure and carrying out associated administrative duties. The Municipal Corporation is headed by a mayor. There are 150 wards and each ward is represented by an elected member. Jaipur Development Authority (JDA) is the nodal government agency responsible for the planning and development of Jaipur. Jaipur consists of two parliamentary constituencies Jaipur and Jaipur Rural. Shri Mohan Lal Gupta was the first mayor of Jaipur Nagar Nigam in the year 1994.

In 2025, the state government made a decision to merge Jaipur Municipal Corporation Greater and Heritage and to restructure the municipal zones.

== Wards ==
Mayor: Sunil Kothari
Deputy Mayor: Saroj Kanwar
Area	No.	Councillor	Party
Vidyadhar Nagar	1	Mohanlal Kumawat	Independent politician
Vidyadhar Nagar	2 (OBC)	Maniraj Singh	Indian National Congress
Vidyadhar Nagar	3	Bhavani Shankar Sharma	Bharatiya Janta Party
Vidyadhar Nagar	4 (W)	Pinky Devi Sharma	Bharatiya Janta Party
Vidyadhar Nagar	5	Devendra Singh Nitharwal	Independent politician
Vidyadhar Nagar	6 (W)	Sneh Lata Sabu	Bharatiya Janta Party
Vidyadhar Nagar	7 (W)	Punam Sharma	Indian National Congress
Vidyadhar Nagar	8 (W)	Manju Sharma	Independent politician
Vidyadhar Nagar	9 (W)	Kailashi Devi	Indian National Congress
Vidyadhar Nagar	10 (OBC-W)	Palak Yadav	Bharatiya Janta Party
Vidyadhar Nagar	11	Shailendra Sharma	Bharatiya Janta Party
Vidyadhar Nagar	12 (OBC)	Rajendra Kumar Saini	Bharatiya Janta Party
Vidyadhar Nagar	13	Ranveer Singh Rajawat	Independent politician
Vidyadhar Nagar	14	Digvijay Singh	Bharatiya Janta Party
Vidyadhar Nagar	15	Vikram Singh Shekhawat	Bharatiya Janta Party
Vidyadhar Nagar	16	Mahesh Kumar Sanghi	Bharatiya Janta Party
Vidyadhar Nagar	17	Sumer Singh	Bharatiya Janta Party
Vidyadhar Nagar	18 (OBC)	Vandita Sharma	Indian National Congress
Vidyadhar Nagar	19	Mo. Farukh	Indian National Congress
Vidyadhar Nagar	20 (W)	Udita Singh Chauhan	Bharatiya Janata Party
Vidyadhar Nagar	21	Rakesh Lata Sharma	Indian National Congress
Vidyadhar Nagar	22	Virendra Singh Shekhawat	Bharatiya Janata Party
Jhotwara	23 (OBC)	Vikas Bareth	Bharatiya Janata Party
Jhotwara	24	Anand Singh Khedi	Bharatiya Janata Party
Jhotwara	25 (W)	Rekha Devi Saini	Indian National Congress
Jhotwara	26 (OBC-W)	Sushila	Independent politician
Jhotwara	27 (OBC)	Shankar Lal Yadav	Bharatiya Janata Party
Jhotwara	28	Ravindra Singh Shekhawat	Indian National Congress
Jhotwara	29	Vikram Singh Shekhawat	Independent politician
Jhotwara	30	Yuvraj Rathore	Bharatiya Janata Party
Jhotwara	31	Vijay Agarwal	Bharatiya Janata Party
Jhotwara	32 (W)	Seema	Indian National Congress
Jhotwara	33 (OBC-W)	Seema Yadav	Bharatiya Janata Party
Jhotwara	34	Suresh Yadav	Indian National Congress
Jhotwara	35	Amar Chand Kumawat	Independent politician
Jhotwara	36	Gajendra Singh Shekhawat	Bharatiya Janata Party
Jhotwara	37 (SC)	Devi Lal Kasotia	Indian National Congress
Sanganer	38 (OBC)	Ganesh Narayan Jat	Bharatiya Janata Party
Sanganer	39 (OBC)	Ajay Saini	Indian National Congress
Sanganer	40	Neeraj Kumar Garg	Bharatiya Janata Party
Sanganer	41 (OBC)	Daya Singh	Bharatiya Janata Party
Sanganer	42 (OBC)	Ashok Rawatani	Bharatiya Janata Party
Sanganer	43	Shailendra Bhargava	Bharatiya Janata Party
Sanganer	44	Naveen Kumar Bhandari	Bharatiya Janata Party
Sanganer	45 (SC)	Subhash Chandra Nonihal	Indian National Congress
Sanganer	46 (W)	Shiva Kanta Pandey	Bharatiya Janata Party
Sanganer	47	Deepa Nathawat	Bharatiya Janata Party
Sanganer	48 (OBC)	Siddharth Tondwal	Bharatiya Janata Party
Sanganer	49	Dharam Singh	Indian National Congress
Sanganer	50 (SC)	Prahlad Chawla	Bharatiya Janata Party
Sanganer	51 (OBC)	Manmohan Gurjar	Indian National Congress
Sanganer	52 (OBC)	Hanuman Saini	Indian National Congress
Sanganer	53 (OBC)	Satish Kumar Sharma	Bharatiya Janata Party
Sanganer	54	Kamal Kishore	Bharatiya Janata Party
Sanganer	55 (SC)	Rinku Umarwal	Bharatiya Janata Party
Sanganer	56 (W)	Sharda	Indian National Congress
Sanganer	57	Girraj Prasad Sharma	Bharatiya Janata Party
Sanganer	58 (SC-W)	Saroj Verma	Bharatiya Janata Party
Bagru	59 (SC-W)	Durga Devi	Indian National Congress
Bagru	60 (ST)	Ramphool Meena	Indian National Congress
Bagru	61 (ST)	Suresh Meena	Indian National Congress
Bagru	62	Ramavtar Sharma	Bharatiya Janata Party
Bagru	63 (SC)	Prabhu Dayal	Indian National Congress
Bagru	64 (ST)	Suresh Meena	Bharatiya Janata Party
Bagru	65 (SC)	Mukesh Kumar	Indian National Congress
Bagru	66 (SC)	Narayan Lal Ninawat	Bharatiya Janata Party
Bagru	67	Arun Sharma	Bharatiya Janata Party
Bagru	68 (ST-W)	Mausmi Meena	Bharatiya Janata Party
Bagru	69 (SC-W)	Beena Devi	Indian National Congress
Bagru	70 (W)	Sushila	Bharatiya Janata Party
Bagru	71	Faiz Hasan	Indian National Congress
Bagru	72 (SC-W)	Suman Maretha	Indian National Congress
Malviya Nagar	73 (W)	Jayshree Agarwal	Bharatiya Janata Party
Malviya Nagar	74	Rampal	Bharatiya Janata Party
Malviya Nagar	75 (OBC-W)	Pooja Sanamukhani	Bharatiya Janata Party
Malviya Nagar	76	Puneet Karnawat	Bharatiya Janata Party
Malviya Nagar	77	Prem Kumar Jain	Bharatiya Janata Party
Malviya Nagar	78	Shyam Sundar Sharma	Bharatiya Janata Party
Malviya Nagar	79 (SC)	Praveen Kumar	Indian National Congress
Malviya Nagar	80 (OBC-W)	Renu	Independent politician
Malviya Nagar	81	Brahm Kumar	Bharatiya Janta Party
Malviya Nagar	82 (OBC)	Mahesh Chand Yadav	Indian National Congress
Malviya Nagar	83 (OBC)	Chandra Prakash Kumawat	Indian National Congress
Malviya Nagar	84 (SC)	Bharat Kumar	Indian National Congress
Malviya Nagar	85 (SC)	Prem Chand	Bharatiya Janta Party
Malviya Nagar	86 (SC-W)	Tara Devi Beniwal	Indian National Congress
Malviya Nagar	87 (W)	Pratibha Sharma	Bharatiya Janta Party
Civil Line	88 (W)	Shashi Kumari Mishra	Bharatiya Janta Party
Civil Line	89	Bhavani Singh Rajawat	Bharatiya Janta Party
Civil Line	90 (OBC-W)	Saroj Kanwar	Bharatiya Janta Party
Civil Line	91 (OBC)	Sitaram Mehra	Indian National Congress
Civil Line	92 (W)	Sheela Sharma	Bharatiya Janta Party
Civil Line	93	Jitendra Sharma	Indian National Congress
Civil Line	94 (OBC-W)	Santosh Sood	Indian National Congress
Civil Line	95	Manvendra Singh Shekhawat	Indian National Congress
Civil Line	96	Md. Wasim	Indian National Congress
Civil Line	97	Shashi Prakash Sharma	Bharatiya Janta Party
Civil Line	98	Subhash Chandra Singi	Bharatiya Janta Party
Civil Line	99	Satyendra Singh	Indian National Congress
Civil Line	100 (W)	Kavita Sharma	Bharatiya Janta Party
Civil Line	101	Ravi Shankar	Bharatiya Janta Party
Civil Line	102 (OBC-W)	Sheela Gurjar	Indian National Congress
Civil Line	103	Md. Hanif	Indian National Congress
Kishanpole	104	Gyan Chand Khandelwal	Bharatiya Janta Party
Kishanpole	105	Mahesh Tamboli	Indian National Congress
Kishanpole	106	Chandra Prakash	Bharatiya Janta Party
Kishanpole	107 (W)	Anuradha Maheshwari	Bharatiya Janta Party
Kishanpole	108 (W)	Sangeeta Sharma	Independent politician
Kishanpole	109	Mohammad Raees Khan	Independent politician
Kishanpole	110 (W)	Sunita Methi	Indian National Congress
Kishanpole	111	Sanjay	Bharatiya Janta Party
Kishanpole	112	Sunil	Bharatiya Janta Party
Kishanpole	113 (OBC)	Ghaznafar Ali	Indian National Congress
Kishanpole	114	Md. Zakaria	Indian National Congress
Kishanpole	115 (SC)	Suraj Godiwal	Bharatiya Janta Party
Adarsh Nagar	116 (W)	Sanjeeda	Indian National Congress
Adarsh Nagar	117 (W)	Sanjeeda Begum	Indian National Congress
Adarsh Nagar	118	Sunita Gupta Mawar	Indian National Congress
Adarsh Nagar	119	Irfan Qureshi	Indian National Congress
Adarsh Nagar	120	Shyam Sundar Saini	Bharatiya Janta Party
Adarsh Nagar	121	Neeraj Agarwal	Bharatiya Janta Party
Adarsh Nagar	122 (OBC)	Ghanshyam Chandlani	Bharatiya Janta Party
Adarsh Nagar	123 (W)	Poonam Mehta	Bharatiya Janta Party
Adarsh Nagar	124 (SC-W)	Kanta	Indian National Congress
Adarsh Nagar	125 (W)	Manjo Bano	Indian National Congress
Adarsh Nagar	126 (W)	Sofia Bano	Indian National Congress
Adarsh Nagar	127	Badal	Indian National Congress
Adarsh Nagar	128	Mohammed Ishaq	Independent politician
Adarsh Nagar	129 (SC)	Mahesh Kumar Samaria	Indian National Congress
Adarsh Nagar	130	Suraj Kumar Sharma	Bharatiya Janta Party
Adarsh Nagar	131 (ST)	Kailash Chand Meena	Bharatiya Janta Party
Adarsh Nagar	132 (SC)	Dashrath Atal	Indian National Congress
Hawamahal	133 (W)	Seema Suresh Pareek	Bharatiya Janta Party
Hawamahal	134	Prakash Saini	Bharatiya Janta Party
Hawamahal	135	Vimal Agarwal	Bharatiya Janta Party
Hawamahal	136 (W)	Jamila Begum	Independent politician
Hawamahal	137	Salman Mansoori	Indian National Congress
Hawamahal	138 (W)	Deepika Sharma	Indian National Congress
Hawamahal	139 (W)	Renu Khandelwal	Bharatiya Janta Party
Hawamahal	140	Bhupendra Kumar Meena	Independent politician
Hawamahal	141	Satish Kumar	Bharatiya Janta Party
Hawamahal	142 (SC-W)	Bhagwati	Bharatiya Janta Party
Hawamahal	143 (OBC-W)	Jayda Bano Chirania	Indian National Congress
Hawamahal	144 (OBC)	Ashish Sahu	Bharatiya Janta Party
Hawamahal	145 (W)	Vandana Joshi	Bharatiya Janta Party
Hawamahal	146 (OBC-W)	Firoz	Independent politician
Hawamahal	147 (OBC)	Rashid Ali	Indian National Congress
Amer	148 (W)	Barkha Devi	Independent politician
Amer	149 (W)	Sinu Pareek	Bharatiya Janta Party
Amer	150 (ST-W)	Hira Devi	Indian National Congress

== See also ==
- Jaipur
- Jaipur State
- List of world's biggest cities
