= 2019 Indian general election in Rajasthan =

Indian lower house election in rj

- 11 April 2019 and 6 May 2019

25 seats
- Turnout: 66.34% (▲3.23%)
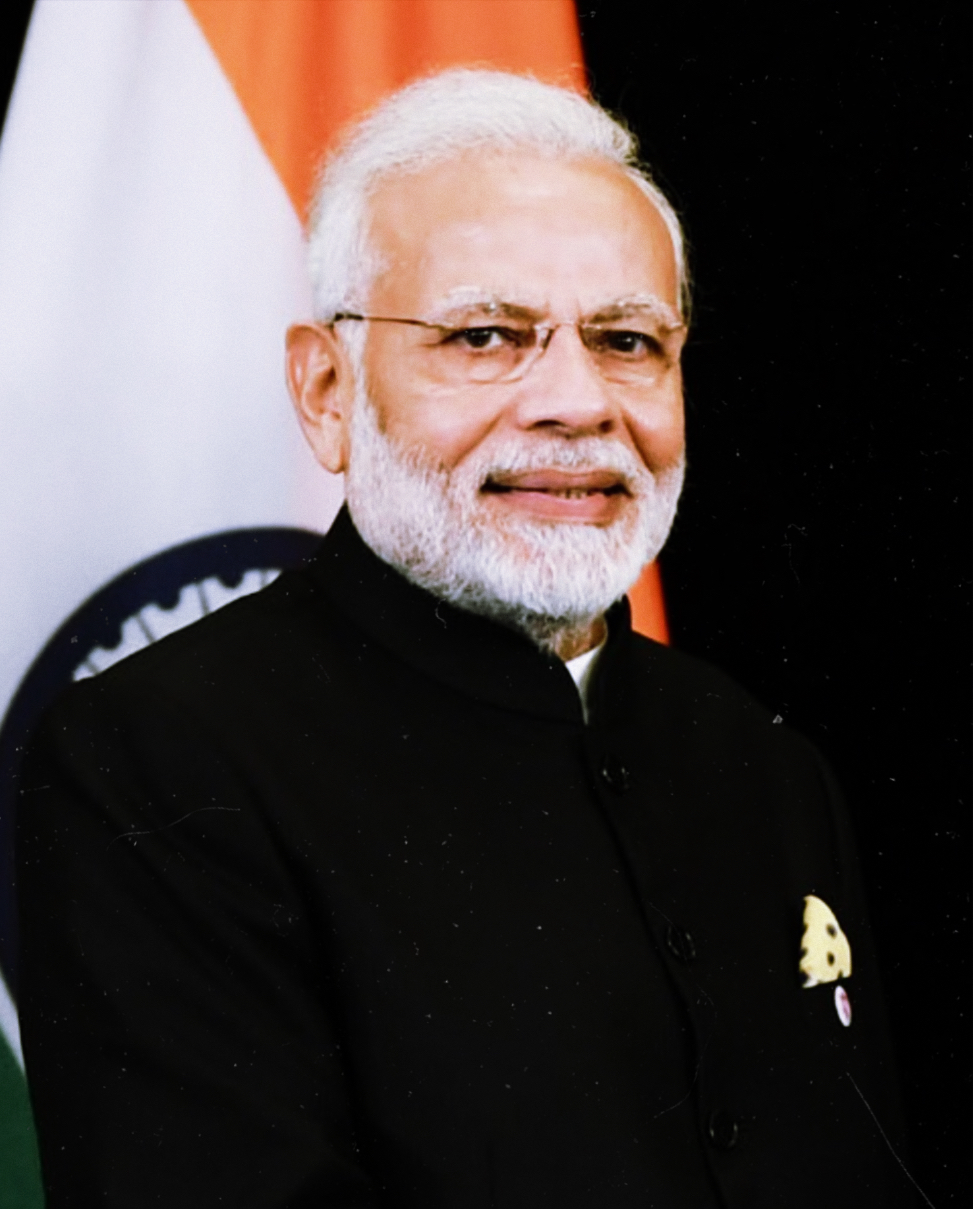

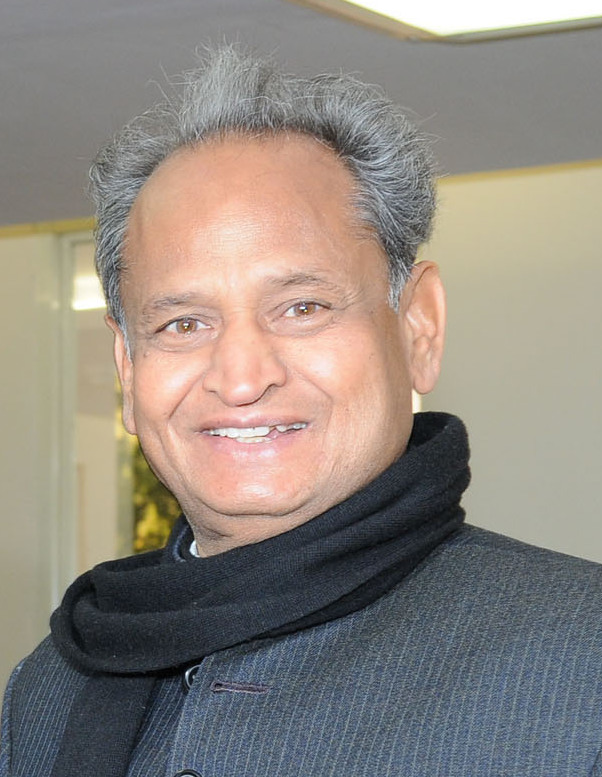

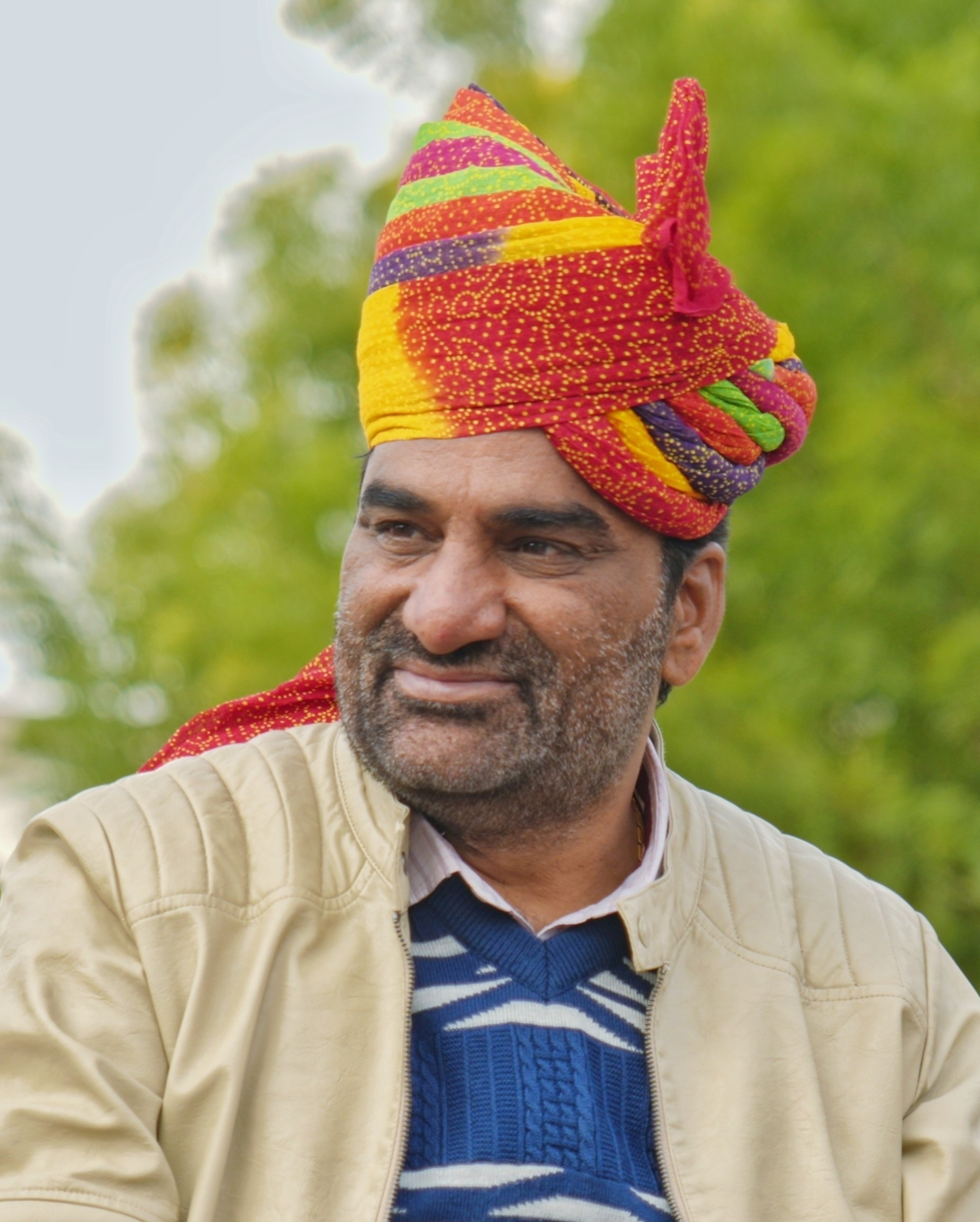
| | First party | Second party | Third party |
|---|---|---|---|
| Leader | Narendra Modi | Ashok Gehlot | Hanuman Beniwal |
| Party | BJP | INC | RLP |
| Alliance | NDA | UPA | NDA |
| Last election | 25 | 0 | New |
| Seats won | 24 | 0 | 1 |
| Seat change | ▼1 | Steady | ▲1 |
| Percentage | 59.07% | 34.24% | 2.04% |
| Swing | ▲2.89% | ▲3.61% | ▲2.04% |
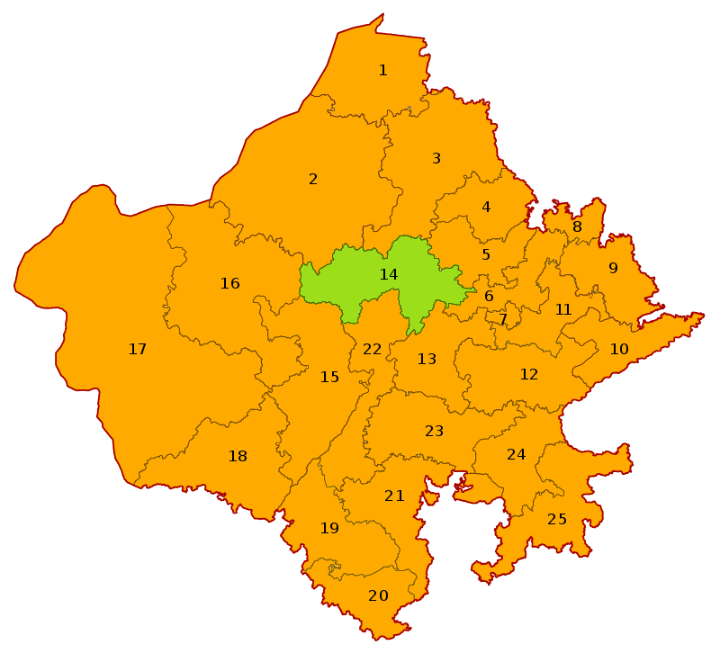
- Rajasthan
Prime Minister before election
Narendra Modi
BJP
Prime Minister after election
Narendra Modi
BJP

The 2019 Indian general election were held in Rajasthan in two phases- 29 April and 6 May 2019 to constitute the 17th Lok Sabha.

== Parties and alliances ==
=== National Democratic Alliance ===
| Party | Flag | Symbol | Leader | Seats contested |
|---|---|---|---|---|
| Bharatiya Janata Party | | | Narendra Modi | 24 |
| Rashtriya Loktantrik Party | | | Hanuman Beniwal | 1 |

=== United Progressive Alliance ===
| Party | Flag | Symbol | Leader | Seats contested |
|---|---|---|---|---|
| Indian National Congress | | | Ashok Gehlot | 25 |

== List of Candidates ==
| Constituency | | | | | |
| Constituency | | NDA | | UPA | |
| 1 | Ganganagar (SC) | BJP | Nihal Chand Chauhan | INC | Bharat Ram Meghwal |
| 2 | Bikaner (SC) | BJP | Arjun Ram Meghwal | INC | Madangopal Meghwal |
| 3 | Churu | BJP | Rahul Kaswan | INC | Rafique Mandelia |
| 4 | Jhunjhunu | BJP | Narendra Khinchal | INC | Shrawan Kumar |
| 5 | Sikar | BJP | Sumedhanand Saraswati | INC | Subhash Maharia |
| 6 | Jaipur Rural | BJP | Rajyavardhan Singh Rathore | INC | Krishna Poonia |
| 7 | Jaipur | BJP | Ramcharan Bohra | INC | Jyoti Khandelwal |
| 8 | Alwar | BJP | Mahant Balaknath | INC | Jitendra Singh |
| 9 | Bharatpur (SC) | BJP | Ranjeeta Kohli | INC | Abhijeet Kumar Jatav |
| 10 | Karauli-Dholpur (SC) | BJP | Manoj Rajuriya | INC | Sanjay Kumar Jatav |
| 11 | Dausa (ST) | BJP | Jaskaur Meena | INC | Savita Meena |
| 12 | Tonk-Sawai Madhopur | BJP | Sukhbir Singh Jaunapuria | INC | Namo Narain Meena |
| 13 | Ajmer | BJP | Bhagirath Chaudhary | INC | Rijju Jhunjhunuwala |
| 14 | Nagaur | RLP | Hanuman Beniwal | INC | Dr. Jyoti Mirdha |
| 15 | Pali | BJP | P. P. Chaudhary | INC | Badri Ram Jakhar |
| 16 | Jodhpur | BJP | Gajendra Singh Shekhawat | INC | Vaibhav Gehlot |
| 17 | Barmer | BJP | Kailash Choudhary | INC | Manvendra Singh |
| 18 | Jalore | BJP | Devji Mansinghram Patel | INC | Ratan Dewasi |
| 19 | Udaipur (ST) | BJP | Arjunlal Meena | INC | Raghuveer Meena |
| 20 | Banswara (ST) | BJP | Kanak Mal Katara | INC | Tarachand Bhagora |
| 21 | Chittorgarh | BJP | Chandra Prakash Joshi | INC | Gopal Singh Idwa |
| 22 | Rajsamand | BJP | Diya Kumari | INC | Devkinandan Gurjar |
| 23 | Bhilwara | BJP | Subhash Chandra Baheria | INC | Rampal Sharma |
| 24 | Kota | BJP | Om Birla | INC | Ramnarayan Meena |
| 25 | Jhalawar-Baran | BJP | Dushyant Singh | INC | Pramod Sharma |

== Results ==
| Alliance/ Party | | Popular vote | | | Seats | | |
| Alliance/ Party | | Votes | % | ±pp | Contested | Won | +/− |
|---|---|---|---|---|---|---|---|
| NDA | BJP | 1,89,68,392 | 58.47 | ▲3.53 | 24 | 24 | ▼1 |
| NDA | RLP | 6,60,051 | 2.03 | New entry | 1 | 1 | ▲1 |
| NDA | Total | 1,96,28,443 | 60.50 | ▲5.56 | 25 | 25 | Steady |
| INC | | 1,11,07,910 | 34.24 | ▲3.88 | 25 | 0 | Steady |
| BSP | | 3,48,678 | 1.07 | ▼1.27 | 20 | 0 | Steady |
| Others | | 6,80,890 | 2.11 | Steady | 68 | 0 | Steady |
| IND | | 3,47,584 | 1.07 | ▼5.59 | 111 | 0 | Steady |
| NOTA | | 3,27,559 | 1.01 | ▼0.20 | 25 | Steady | Steady |
| Total | | 3,24,41,064 | 100% | - | 274 | 25 | - |

== List of elected MPs ==
| Constituency | | Winner | | | | Runner Up | | | | Margin | % |
| # | Name | Candidate | Party | Votes | % | Candidate | Party | Votes | % | Margin | % |
|---|---|---|---|---|---|---|---|---|---|---|---|
| 1 | Ganganagar (SC) | Nihal Chand | BJP | 897,177 | 61.74 | Bharat Ram Meghwal | INC | 490,199 | 33.74 | 406,978 | 28.00 |
| 2 | Bikaner (SC) | Arjun Ram Meghwal | BJP | 657,743 | 59.77 | Madan Gopal Meghwal | INC | 393,662 | 35.77 | 264,081 | 24.00 |
| 3 | Churu | Rahul Kaswan | BJP | 792,999 | 59.59 | Rafique Mandelia | INC | 458,597 | 34.46 | 334,402 | 25.13 |
| 4 | Jhunjhunu | Narendra Kumar | BJP | 738,163 | 61.32 | Sharwan Kumar | INC | 435,616 | 36.19 | 302,547 | 25.13 |
| 5 | Sikar | Sumedhanand Saraswati | BJP | 772,104 | 58.02 | Subhash Maharia | INC | 474,948 | 35.69 | 297,156 | 22.33 |
| 6 | Jaipur Rural | Col. Rajyavardhan Rathore | BJP | 820,132 | 64.09 | Krishna Poonia | INC | 426,961 | 33.37 | 393,171 | 30.72 |
| 7 | Jaipur | Ramcharan Bohra | BJP | 924,065 | 63.44 | Jyoti Khandelwal | INC | 493,439 | 33.88 | 430,626 | 29.56 |
| 8 | Alwar | Balak Nath | BJP | 760,201 | 59.93 | Bhanwar Jitendra Singh | INC | 430,230 | 33.92 | 329,971 | 26.01 |
| 9 | Bharatpur (SC) | Ranjeeta Koli | BJP | 707,992 | 61.62 | Abhijeet Kumar Jatav | INC | 389,593 | 33.91 | 318,399 | 27.71 |
| 10 | Karauli-Dholpur (SC) | Manoj Rajoria | BJP | 526,443 | 52.69 | Sanjay Kumar | INC | 428,761 | 42.91 | 97,682 | 9.78 |
| 11 | Dausa (ST) | Jaskaur Meena | BJP | 548,733 | 51.57 | Savita Meena | INC | 470,289 | 44.20 | 78,444 | 7.37 |
| 12 | Tonk-Sawai Madhopur | Sukhbir Singh Jaunapuria | BJP | 644,319 | 52.19 | Namonarayan | INC | 533,028 | 43.18 | 111,291 | 9.01 |
| 13 | Ajmer | Bhagirath Chaudhary | BJP | 815,076 | 64.52 | Riju Jhunjhunwala | INC | 398,652 | 31.56 | 416,424 | 32.96 |
| 14 | Nagaur | Hanuman Beniwal | RLP | 660,051 | 54.79 | Dr. Jyoti Mirdha | INC | 478,791 | 39.74 | 181,260 | 15.05 |
| 15 | Pali | P. P. Chaudhary | BJP | 900,149 | 66.11 | Badriram Jakhar | INC | 418,552 | 30.74 | 481,597 | 35.37 |
| 16 | Jodhpur | Gajendra Singh Shekhawat | BJP | 788,888 | 58.53 | Vaibhav Gehlot | INC | 514,448 | 38.17 | 274,440 | 20.36 |
| 17 | Barmer | Kailash Choudhary | BJP | 846,526 | 59.49 | Manvendra Singh | INC | 522,718 | 36.74 | 323,808 | 22.75 |
| 18 | Jalore | Devaji Patel | BJP | 772,833 | 56.76 | Ratan Devasi | INC | 511,723 | 37.58 | 261,110 | 19.18 |
| 19 | Udaipur (ST) | Arjunlal Meena | BJP | 871,548 | 59.88 | Raghuvir Singh Meena | INC | 433,634 | 29.79 | 437,914 | 30.09 |
| 20 | Banswara (ST) | Kanakmal Katara | BJP | 711,709 | 49.42 | Tarachand Bhagora | INC | 406,245 | 28.21 | 305,464 | 21.21 |
| 21 | Chittorgarh | Chandra Prakash Joshi | BJP | 982,942 | 67.36 | Gopal Singh Shekhawat | INC | 406,695 | 27.87 | 576,247 | 39.49 |
| 22 | Rajsamand | Diya Kumari | BJP | 863,039 | 69.55 | Devkinandan (Kaka) | INC | 311,123 | 25.07 | 551,916 | 44.48 |
| 23 | Bhilwara | Subhash Chandra Baheria | BJP | 938,160 | 71.56 | Ram Pal Sharma | INC | 326,160 | 24.88 | 612,000 | 46.68 |
| 24 | Kota | Om Birla | BJP | 800,051 | 58.49 | Ramnarain Meena | INC | 520,374 | 38.04 | 279,677 | 20.45 |
| 25 | Jhalawar-Baran | Dushyant Singh | BJP | 887,400 | 64.77 | Pramod Sharma | INC | 433,472 | 31.64 | 453,928 | 33.13 |

== Post-election Union Council of Ministers from Rajasthan ==
| # | Name | Constituency | Designation | Department | From | To | Party |
|---|---|---|---|---|---|---|---|
| 1 | Gajendra Singh Shekhawat | Jodhpur | Cabinet Minister | Minister of Jal Shakti | 31 May 2019 | 9 June 2024 | BJP |
| 2 | Bhupender Yadav | Rajya Sabha (Rajasthan) | Cabinet Minister | Minister of Environment, Forest and Climate Change; Minister of Labour and Employment | 7 July 2021 | 9 June 2024 | BJP |
| 3 | Arjun Ram Meghwal | Bikaner (SC) | MoS (I/C); MoS | Ministry of Law and Justice (Ind. Charge from May 2023); Ministry of Parliamentary Affairs; Ministry of Culture (from July 2021); Ministry of Heavy Industries and Public Enterprises (until July 2021) | 31 May 2019 | 9 June 2024 | BJP |
| 4 | Kailash Choudhary | Barmer | MoS | Ministry of Agriculture and Farmers' Welfare | 31 May 2019 | 9 June 2024 | BJP |

== Assembly segments wise lead of parties ==
| Party | Assembly segments | Position in Assembly (as of 2023 election) |
|---|---|---|
| BJP | 176 | 115 |
| INC | 16 | 70 |
| RLP | 7 | 1 |
| BAP | – | 3 |
| Others | – | 11 |
| Total | 200 | |
