= Brij Kishore Sharma =

Indian politician

Minister of Primary & Secondary Education, Government of Rajasthan
- In office 17 November 2011 – 9 December 2013
- Chief Minister: Ashok Gehlot
- Succeeded by: Kiran Maheshwari

Member of the Rajasthan Legislative Assembly
- In office 2008–2013
- Preceded by: Surendra Pareek
- Succeeded by: Surendra Pareek
- Constituency: Hawa Mahal

Personal details
- Born: 22 June 1947 Dausa, Rajasthan, India
- Party: Indian National Congress
- Spouse: Santosh Sharma (m. 1970)
- Parent: Nawal Kishore Sharma (father)
- Occupation: Business
- Profession: Engineer, Politician
- Source

Brij Kishore Sharma (born c.1947) is an Indian former politician.

He was born in 1947, the eldest son of Nawal Kishore Sharma, the Governor of Gujarat State (2004-2009), and Munni Devi.

In 1968 he obtained a Diploma in Electrical Engineering from the Rajasthan Board of Technical Education.

In 2008, Sharma contested the Rajasthan Legislative Assembly elections, as the Indian National Congress candidate, for the Hawa Mahal constituency. He polled 44,926 votes (41% of the total vote) winning the seat by a margin of 580 votes, defeating the Bharatiya Janata Party candidate, Manju Sharma, the daughter of Bhanwar Lal Sharma.

Sharma was subsequently appointed as Education Minister in Chief Minister Ashok Gehlot's Cabinet.

At the 2013 Rajasthan Legislative Assembly elections he lost the seat to Surendra Pareek, the former member for Hawa Mahal, by 12,715 votes.
