= Loktantrik Morcha (Rajasthan) =

- Leader: Amra Ram
- Ideology: Big tent Majority: Communism; Faction: Secularism; Minority rights Social democracy
- Political position: Left-wing
- Seats in Rajasthan Legislative Assembly: 0 / 200

Loktantrik Morcha is a political front in Rajasthan, India. It was formed as an alliance of several left-wing and socialist parties to contest state elections and provide an alternative to the mainstream parties.

Loktantrik Morcha was formed on 4 June 2013 as a seven-party alliance of left-wing parties and other supporting parties in Rajasthan, India. The Communist Party of India (Marxist) leader Amra Ram was, as of 2018, the chief ministerial candidate.

The front initially included:

- Communist Party of India (Marxist) (CPI(M))
- Communist Party of India (CPI)
- Communist Party of India (Marxist–Leninist) Liberation (CPI(ML) Liberation)
- Marxist Communist Party of India (United) (MCPI(U))
- Samajwadi Party
- Janata Dal (Secular)

Later, the sole MLA from the Rashtriya Lok Dal (RLD) declared support for the Indian National Congress-led government in the state.

Party	Flag	Abbr.	Leader
Communist Party of India (Marxist)		CPI(M)	Amra Ram
Communist Party of India		CPI	Narendra Acharya
Communist Party of India (Marxist–Leninist) Liberation		CPI(ML)L	Mahendra Choudhury
Samajwadi Party	SP Flag	SP	Mukesh Yadav

== See also ==
- Politics of Rajasthan
- Left Front (India)
- Indian general election, 2019 (Rajasthan)
