= Girdhari Lal Bhargava =

Indian politician (1936–2009)

Member of Parliament, Lok Sabha
- In office 1989 – 8 March 2009
- Preceded by: Nawal Kishore Sharma
- Succeeded by: Mahesh Joshi
- Constituency: Jaipur

Member of Rajasthan Legislative Assembly
- In office 1985–1990
- Succeeded by: Rameshwar Bhardwaj
- Constituency: Kishanpole
- In office 1977–1980
- Succeeded by: Ram Gotewala
- Constituency: Kishanpole
- In office 1972–1977
- Succeeded by: Bhanwarlal Sharma
- Constituency: Hawa Mahal

Personal details
- Born: 11 November 1936 Jaipur, Jaipur State, British India
- Died: 8 March 2009 (aged 72) Ahmedabad, Gujarat, India
- Party: Bharatiya Janata Party
- Spouse: Malti Bhargav
- Children: 1 son and 3 daughters
- As of 14 September 2006

Girdhari Lal Bhargava (11 November 1936 – 8 March 2009) was a member of the Lok Sabha (lower house of parliament) in India. A member of the Bharatiya Janata Party, he was elected six consecutive times for the Jaipur constituency of Rajasthan. He defeated Bhawani Singh by nearly 100,000 votes and thereafter had margins always above 100,000 votes. He died on 8 March 2009 from a heart attack while he was visiting Ahmedabad.He was from a brahmin family

== Positions held ==
Important posts holding in his career
Year	Post
1972–89	Member, Rajasthan Legislative Assembly (three terms)
1980–89	Chairman, Library Committee
1980–89	Chairman, Committee on Government Assurances
1980–89	Member, Committee on Estimates
1980–89	Member, Committee on Petitions
1989	Elected to 9th Lok Sabha
1990–91	Member, Consultative Committee, Ministry of Railways
1990–91	Member, Rules Committee
1991	Re-elected to 10th Lok Sabha (2nd term)
1996	Re-elected to 11th Lok Sabha (3rd term)
1996–97	Member, Committee on Finance
1998	Re-elected to 12th Lok Sabha (4th term)
1998–99	Member, Committee on Finance
1998–99	Member, General Purposes Committee
1998–99	Member, Consultative Committee, Ministry of Finance
1999	Re-elected to 13th Lok Sabha (5th term)
1999–2000	Member, Committee on Estimates
1999–2000	Member, Committee on Commerce
1999–2000	Member, Rules Committee
1999–2000	Member, Committee on Energy
2000 onwards	Member, Consultative Committee, Ministry of Railways

== Winning of Jaipur constituency ==
Winning of Jaipur constituency
Year	Voters (in 1000)	Voter turnout (%)	Vote Gain (%)	Runner up candidate (Vote Gain %)
2004	881.38	46.47	54.56	Pratap Singh Khachariawas (42.40)
1999	808.58	46.11	38.96	Pt. Raghu Sharma (38.96)
1998	799.93	49.30	56.43	M Sayeed Khan (38.83)
1996	639.55	38.61	54.60	Pt. Dinesh Chandra Swami (36.36)
1991	559.97	41.58	59.03	Nawal Kishore Sharma (36.21)
1989	724.03	58.79	54.25	Bhawani Singh (42.32)
