= Sunil Kothari (politician) =

Indian politician and Mayor of Jaipur

Mayor of Jaipur
- Incumbent
- Assumed office 25 September 2026

Personal details
- Party: Bharatiya Janata Party
- Profession: Politician

Sunil Kothari is an Indian politician and businessman from Rajasthan who is currently serving as the Mayor of the Jaipur Municipal Corporation.

== Career ==
Kothari began his public life with the Rashtriya Swayamsevak Sangh (RSS) and has been associated with the Bharatiya Janata Party (BJP) for over three decades. Within the BJP's Rajasthan unit, he has held several organizational roles, including Jaipur City President, State Secretary, State Vice President, and member of the State Working Committee.

In the September 2026 Jaipur Municipal Corporation elections, Kothari contested from Ward No. 112 (Kishanpol area) and defeated Indian National Congress candidate Ashish Sharma by a margin of 905 votes. Following the municipal elections, Kothari was elected Mayor of the Jaipur Municipal Corporation on 25 September 2026, securing 89 votes against Indian National Congress candidate Sunita mawar, who received 60 votes.
