= P.L. Chaturvedi =

Vice Chancellor

Chancellor, Central University of Haryana
- In office 2018 – 19 December 2020

Personal details
- Born: 1934
- Died: 19 December 2020 (aged 85–86) Jaipur, India
- Children: Arun Chaturvedi and 2 others
- Occupation: Professor, Chancellor, Vice-Chancellor
- Profession: Teaching, Administration

P.L. Chaturvedi (1934-2020) was an Indian academic and educationist who served as Chancellor of Central University of Haryana and the Vice Chancellor of Maharshi Dayanand Saraswati University of Ajmer.

== Life ==
He was the father of Arun Chaturvedi, former Minister of Social Justice and Empowerment in Rajasthan, and Sanjay Chaturvedi a hospitality professional.

Chaturvedi had nearly five decades of teaching experience in various colleges in Rajasthan.

He also served as the National Vice President of All India Universities and Colleges Federation, President of Rajasthan University and College Educational Association, National Vice President of Education Board of India, President of Vidya Bharati Rajasthan and Chairman of Control and Fee Fixation Committee, and the President of Madhya Pradesh Professional College for three years.

He died on 19 December 2020 in the age of 86.
