= Adarsh Nagar, Rajasthan Assembly constituency =

Legislative Assembly constituency in Rajasthan State, India

Coordinates: 26.91°N 75.82°E

Adarsh Nagar
- Constituency No. 53 for the Rajasthan Legislative Assembly

Constituency details
- Country: India
- Region: North India
- State: Rajasthan
- District: Jaipur
- Lok Sabha constituency: Jaipur
- Established: 2008
- Total electors: 268,419
- Reservation: None

Member of Legislative Assembly
- 16th Rajasthan Legislative Assembly
- Incumbent Rafeek Khan
- Party: Indian National Congress
- Elected year: 2023

Adarsh Nagar Assembly constituency is one of the 200 Legislative Assembly constituencies of Rajasthan state in India. It is in Jaipur district and is a segment of Jaipur Lok Sabha constituency. This seat came into existence after the 2008 delimitation exercise.

== Member of Legislative Assembly ==
Year	Member	Party
2008	Ashok Parnami	Bharatiya Janata Party
2013	Ashok Parnami	Bharatiya Janata Party
2018	Rafeek Khan	Indian National Congress
2023	Rafeek Khan	Indian National Congress

== Election results ==
=== 2023 ===
Rajasthan Legislative Assembly Election, 2023: Adarsh Nagar
Party	Candidate	Votes	%	±%
INC	Rafeek Khan	103,421	52.18	+1.4
BJP	Ravi Kumar Nayyar	89,348	45.08	+1.5
NOTA	None of the above	1,377	0.69	−0.17
Majority		14,073	7.1	−0.1
Turnout		198,217	73.85	+1.85
INC gain from BJP		Swing		

=== 2018 ===
Rajasthan Legislative Assembly Election, 2018: Adarsh Nagar
Party	Candidate	Votes	%	±%
INC	Rafeek Khan	88,541	50.78	
BJP	Ashok Parnami	75,988	43.58	
NOTA	None of the above	1,493	0.86	
Majority		12,553	7.2	
Turnout		174,371	72.0	
INC gain from BJP		Swing		

== See also ==
- List of constituencies of the Rajasthan Legislative Assembly
- Jaipur district
