= Malviya Nagar, Rajasthan Assembly constituency =

Legislative Assembly constituency in Rajasthan State, India

Coordinates: 26.85°N 75.81°E

Malviya Nagar
- Constituency No. 54 for the Rajasthan Legislative Assembly

Constituency details
- Country: India
- Region: North India
- State: Rajasthan
- District: Jaipur
- Lok Sabha constituency: Jaipur
- Established: 2008
- Total electors: 216,988
- Reservation: None

Member of Legislative Assembly
- 16th Rajasthan Legislative Assembly
- Incumbent Kalicharan Saraf
- Party: Bharatiya Janata Party
- Elected year: 2018

Malviya Nagar Assembly constituency is one of the 200 Legislative Assembly constituencies of Rajasthan state in India.

It is part of Jaipur district.

== Birth and extent of the constituency ==
This constituency was created by the Delimitation of Parliamentary and Assembly Constituencies Order, 2008. The first elections held here, as a separate constituency, were in 2008. The constituency comprises the following wards of the Jaipur Municipal Corporation: 15, 16, 18 to 21, 25 to 27, 31 and 35.

== Members of the Legislative Assembly ==
Year	Member	Party
2008	Kalicharan Saraf	Bharatiya Janata Party
2013	Kalicharan Saraf	Bharatiya Janata Party
2018	Kalicharan Saraf	Bharatiya Janata Party
2023	Kalicharan Saraf	Bharatiya Janata Party

== Election results ==
=== 2023 ===
2023 Rajasthan Legislative Assembly election: Malviya Nagar
Party	Candidate	Votes	%	±%
BJP	Kalicharan Saraf	92,506	60.62	+12.45
INC	Archana Sharma	57,012	37.36	−9.64
NOTA	None of the above	1,598	1.05	−0.58
Majority		35,494	23.26	+22.09
Turnout		152,606	70.33	+2.0
BJP hold		Swing		

=== 2018 ===
Rajasthan Legislative Assembly Election, 2018: Malviya Nagar
Party	Candidate	Votes	%	±%
BJP	Kalicharan Saraf	70,221	48.17	
INC	Dr. Archana Sharma	68,517	47.0	
NOTA	None of the above	2,371	1.63	
Majority		1,704	1.17	
Turnout		145,781	68.33	
BJP hold		Swing		

== See also ==
- List of constituencies of the Rajasthan Legislative Assembly
- Jaipur district
