= Civil Lines Assembly constituency =

Legislative Assembly constituency in Rajasthan State, India

Coordinates: 26.91°N 75.78°E

Civil Lines
- Constituency No. 51 for the Rajasthan Legislative Assembly

Constituency details
- Country: India
- Region: North India
- State: Rajasthan
- District: Jaipur
- Lok Sabha constituency: Jaipur
- Established: 2008
- Total electors: 245,558
- Reservation: None

Member of Legislative Assembly
- 16th Rajasthan Legislative Assembly
- Incumbent Gopal Sharma
- Party: Bharatiya Janata Party
- Elected year: 2023

Civil Lines Assembly constituency is one of the 200 Legislative Assembly constituencies of Rajasthan state in India.

It is part of Jaipur district.

== Members of the Legislative Assembly ==
Year	Member	Party
2008	Pratap Singh Khachariyawas	Indian National Congress
2013	Arun Chaturvedi	Bharatiya Janata Party
2018	Pratap Singh Khachariyawas	Indian National Congress
2023	Gopal Sharma	Bharatiya Janata Party

== Election results ==
=== 2023 ===
2023 Rajasthan Legislative Assembly election:Civil lines
Party	Candidate	Votes	%	±%
BJP	Gopal Sharma	98,661	56.88	+14.35
INC	Pratap Singh Khachariyawas	70,332	40.55	−12.98
NOTA	None of the above	1,216	0.7	−0.36
Majority		28,329	16.33	+5.33
Turnout		173,451	70.64	+1.32
BJP gain from INC		Swing		

=== 2018 ===
Rajasthan Legislative Assembly Election, 2018: Civil Lines
Party	Candidate	Votes	%	±%
INC	Pratap Singh Khachariyawas	87,937	53.53	
BJP	Arun Chaturvedi	69,859	42.53	
NOTA	None of the above	1,744	1.06	
Majority		18,078	11.0	
Turnout		164,271	69.32	

== See also ==
- List of constituencies of the Rajasthan Legislative Assembly
- Jaipur district
