= Manju Sharma (politician) =

Indian politician

Member of Parliament, Lok Sabha
- Incumbent
- Assumed office 2024
- Preceded by: Ramcharan Bohra
- Constituency: Jaipur

Personal details
- Born: September 2, 1960 (age 66) Jaipur, Rajasthan
- Party: Bharatiya Janata Party
- Website: manjusharma.in

Manju Sharma (born 2 September 1960) is an Indian politician and member of the Lok Sabha from Jaipur, Rajasthan. A member of the Bharatiya Janata Party (BJP), she represents the Jaipur constituency in the 18th Lok Sabha.

== Political career ==
Sharma was selected by the BJP as its candidate for the Jaipur constituency for the 2024 Indian general election.

Sharma won the Jaipur constituency in the 2024 general election, receiving 886,850 votes and defeating Indian National Congress candidate Pratap Singh Khachariyawas, who received 555,083 votes, a margin of 331,767 votes.

She took oath as a member of the 18th Lok Sabha on 25 June 2024.

== Personal life and education ==
Sharma was born on 2 September 1960 and is from Jaipur, Rajasthan.

According to news reports at the time of her candidacy, Sharma had previously served as the Jaipur in-charge of the Rajasthan Mahila Pravasi Abhiyan, and had studied at Kanodia College, Jaipur.
