= Rafeek Khan =

Indian politician (born 1966)

Chief Whip of the Congress Legislative Party, Rajasthan Legislative Assembly
- Incumbent
- Assumed office 29 July 2024
- Governor: Haribhau Bagade
- Speaker: Vasudev Devnani

Member of Rajasthan Legislative Assembly
- Incumbent
- Assumed office 2018
- Preceded by: Ashok Parnami
- Constituency: Adarsh Nagar

Personal details
- Born: 24 February 1966 (age 59) Jaipur, Rajasthan, India
- Party: Indian National Congress
- Parent: Chhotu Khan (father)
- Occupation: Politician

Rafeek Khan (born 24 February 1966) is an Indian politician currently serving as the Chief Whip of the Congress Legislative Party in the Rajasthan Legislative Assembly. He represents the Adarsh Nagar Assembly constituency in Jaipur district as a member of the Indian National Congress.

== Political career ==
Rafeek Khan began his political journey with the Indian National Congress and became actively involved in party organization and public outreach in Jaipur. In the 2018 Rajasthan Legislative Assembly election, he was nominated as the Congress candidate from the Adarsh Nagar seat. He won the election by defeating senior Bharatiya Janata Party (BJP) leader and former state party president Ashok Parnami, securing a victory margin of over 12,000 votes.

He was re-elected from the same constituency in the 2023 Rajasthan Legislative Assembly election, increasing both his vote share and victory margin. In July 2024, he was appointed the Chief Whip of the Congress Legislative Party in the Rajasthan Legislative Assembly, a key position responsible for coordinating the party's floor strategy and maintaining legislative discipline.

== Electoral record ==
Election results
Year	Office	Constituency	Candidate (Party)	Votes	%	Opponent (Party)	Opponent Votes	Opponent %	Result	Ref
2018	MLA	Adarsh Nagar	Rafeek Khan (INC)	88,541	50.78	Ashok Parnami (BJP)	75,988	43.58	Won	TOI
2023	MLA	Adarsh Nagar	Rafeek Khan (INC)	103,421	52.18	Ravi Kumar Nayyar (BJP)	89,348	45.08	Won	TOI
