= Mohan Lal Gupta =

Indian politician

Member of Rajasthan Legislative Assembly
- In office 2003–2018
- Preceded by: Mahesh Joshi
- Succeeded by: Aminuddin Kagzi
- Constituency: Kishanpole

Personal details
- Party: Bharatiya Janata Party
- Occupation: Politician

Mohan Lal Gupta is an Indian politician who was the first mayor of Jaipur and former Member of the Legislative Assembly (MLA) of Rajasthan representing Kishanpole Constituency for three consecutive terms. He is a senior leader of Bharatiya Janata Party, social worker, first Mayor of Jaipur, MLA from Kishanpole three times, ex-Chairman P.U.C. Committee and ex-Syndicate Member (UNIRAJ). He also went through prison and was jailed during Indira Gandhi emergency along with former prime minister of India Atal Bihari Vajpayee, Former Vice - President of India Bhairo Singh Shekhawat and others. He is also a recipient of “Loktantra Sainani Saman Nidhi (लोकतंत्र सैनानी समान निधी)” from Government of Rajasthan for prison time he went through for suspension of fundamental rights.
