= Jyoti Khandelwal =

Indian politician

Mayor, Jaipur Municipal Corporation
- In office 2009 - 2014

Personal details
- Born: 13 November 1974 (age 51) Nawalgarh, Rajasthan
- Party: Bharatiya Janata Party
- Education: M.sc in Mathematics, Rajasthan University

Jyoti Khandelwal is an Indian politician who was elected mayor of Jaipur Municipal Corporation in 2009. Jyoti joined Bharatiya Janata Party in October 2023.

In her tenure she has courted many controversies, often sparring with opposition councillors. During her tenure as Mayor, she criticized the Congress led state government for sheltering "corrupt".

In 2019, Khandelwal became the first woman candidate in 48 years to contest the Lok Sabha election from Jaipur. According to her, she enjoys popular women support in Jaipur because of her active involvement with the women in social, cultural and religious events in the city.
