= Hawa Mahal Assembly constituency =

Legislative Assembly constituency in Rajasthan State, India

Coordinates: 26.92°N 75.83°E

Hawa Mahal
- Constituency No. 49 for the Rajasthan Legislative Assembly

Constituency details
- Country: India
- Region: North India
- State: Rajasthan
- District: Jaipur
- Lok Sabha constituency: Jaipur
- Established: 1957
- Total electors: 254,408
- Reservation: None

Member of Legislative Assembly
- 16th Rajasthan Legislative Assembly
- Incumbent Balmukund Acharya
- Party: Bharatiya Janata Party
- Elected year: 2023

Hawa Mahal Assembly constituency is one of the 200 Legislative Assembly constituencies of Rajasthan state in India. It is in Jaipur district.

== Members of the Legislative Assembly ==
Year	Member	Party
1957	Ram Kishore Vyas	Indian National Congress
1962	Durga Lal	Swatantra Party
1967	Durga Lal	Independent
1972	Girdhari Lal Bhargava	Bharatiya Jana Sangh
1977	Bhanwar Lal Sharma	Janata Party
1980	Bhanwar Lal Sharma	Bharatiya Janata Party
1985	Bhanwar Lal Sharma	Bharatiya Janata Party
1990	Bhanwar Lal Sharma	Bharatiya Janata Party
1993	Bhanwar Lal Sharma	Bharatiya Janata Party
1998	Bhanwar Lal Sharma	Bharatiya Janata Party
2003	Surendra Pareek	Bharatiya Janata Party
2008	Brij Kishore Sharma	Indian National Congress
2013	Surendra Pareek	Bharatiya Janata Party
2018	Mahesh Joshi	Indian National Congress
2023	Balmukund Acharya	Bharatiya Janata Party

== Election results ==
=== 2023 ===
Rajasthan Legislative Assembly Election, 2023: Hawa Mahal
Party	Candidate	Votes	%	±%
BJP	Balmukund Acharya	95,989	49.18	▲4.27
INC	R.R. Tiwari	95,015	48.68	▼1.7
NOTA	None of the above	1,463	0.75	▲0.28
Majority		974	0.5	▼4.97
Turnout		195,173	76.72	▲3.82
BJP gain from INC		Swing		

=== 2018 ===
Rajasthan Legislative Assembly Election, 2018: Hawa Mahal
Party	Candidate	Votes	%	±%
INC	Mahesh Joshi	85,474	50.38	
BJP	Surendra Pareek	76,192	44.91	
NOTA	None of the above	796	0.47	
Majority		9,282	5.47	
Turnout		169,666	72.9	
INC gain from BJP		Swing		

=== 2013 ===
Rajasthan Legislative Assembly Election, 2013: Hawa Mahal
Party	Candidate	Votes	%	±%
BJP	Surendra Pareek	69,924	48.89	
INC	Brij Kishore Sharma	57,209	40	
Majority				
Turnout		143017	73.64	
BJP gain from INC		Swing		

== See also ==
- List of constituencies of the Rajasthan Legislative Assembly
- Jaipur district
