= Aminuddin Kagzi =

Indian politician

Member of Rajasthan Legislative Assembly
- Incumbent
- Assumed office 2018
- Preceded by: Mohan Lal Gupta
- Constituency: Kishanpole

Personal details
- Party: Indian National Congress
- Occupation: Politician

Aminuddin Kagzi (also known as Amin Kagzi) is an Indian politician from Rajasthan, affiliated with the Indian National Congress. He has been serving as a Member of the Rajasthan Legislative Assembly from the Kishanpole Assembly constituency since 2018.

== Political career ==
Kagzi was elected to the Rajasthan Legislative Assembly in the 2018 elections, defeating former BJP MLA Mohan Lal Gupta. He was re-elected from the same constituency in the 2023 Rajasthan Legislative Assembly elections.

In February 2022, he was appointed Chairman of the Rajasthan Haj Committee. His tenure as chairman concluded in 2023.

== Personal life ==
In November 2023, Kagzi was in the news for his second marriage to a Hindu woman, which garnered significant public attention due to its interfaith nature and his political profile.

== Electoral record ==
Election results
Year	Office	Constituency	Candidate (Party)	Votes	%	Opponent (Party)	Opponent Votes	Opponent %	Result	Ref
2013	MLA	Kishanpole	Aminuddin Kagzi (INC)	58,555	43.31	Mohan Lal Gupta (BJP)	68,240	50.47	Lost	TOI
2018	MLA	Kishanpole	Aminuddin Kagzi (INC)	71,189	49.95	Mohan Lal Gupta (BJP )	62,419	43.80	Won	TOI
2023	MLA	Kishanpole	Aminuddin Kagzi (INC)	76,611	51.46	Chandra Manohar Batwara (BJP)	69,555	46.72	Won	TOI
