= Radheshyam Ramkumar Morarka =

Indian politician

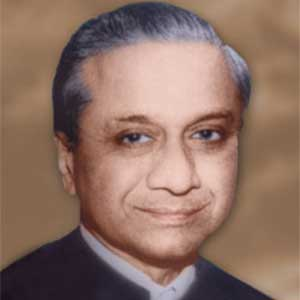
Shri Radheyshyam Morarka

Radheyshyam Ramkumar Morarka (26 March 1923 – 28 May 1995) was a member of Lok Sabha from Jhunjhunu in Rajasthan. He was elected to first Lok Sabha in 1952, from Jhunjhunu (Jhunjhunu & Sri Ganganagar) constituency in Rajasthan as a candidate of Indian National Congress. He was a member of Rajya Sabha from 1978 to 1984. He died in 1995. He studied for B Com at Sydenham College of Commerce in Mumbai and was awarded the gold medal. Member of Public Accounts committee, estimates committee etc. whilst a member of Parliament. he represented the country on various delegations to foreign countries

== Personal life ==
Late Sh. RR Morarka was born in 1923 in Nawalgarh town of Rajasthan's Shekhawati region. After completing his schooling in Nawalgarh, he went to Mumbai to undertake higher education. While still being a student of the Bombay University, he joined the freedom struggle and took part in the 'Quit India' movement.

He has two sons Rajendra Prasad Morarka and Gautam Morarka.

== Political career ==
He started his parliamentary career as a member of Lok Sabha in 1952. During the country's first general elections, he contested from Jhunjhunu (Rajasthan) parliamentary constituency on a Congress ticket and won.

He was the member of the first, second and the third Lok Sabhas, from 1952 to 1967. During his membership of that house, he was a member of the various Select Committees constituted by Parliament, which included the Companies (Amendment) Bill 1953, the Income-tax (Amendment) Bill, the Life Insurance Corporation of India Bill, etc.

Sh. Morarka was a Member of Rajya Sabha, representing the state of Rajasthan from April, 1978 to April, 1984.
