= Mahesh Joshi =

Indian politician

Minister of PHED & Ground Water Government of Rajasthan
- In office 21 November 2021 – 3 December 2023
- Succeeded by: Kanhaiya Lal Choudhary

Chief Whip of Rajasthan Legislative Assembly
- In office December 2018 – 3 December 2023
- Succeeded by: Jogeshwar Garg

Member of Rajasthan Legislative Assembly
- In office 11 December 2018 – 3 December 2023
- Preceded by: Surendra Pareek
- Succeeded by: Balmukund Acharya
- Constituency: Hawa Mahal
- In office 1998–2003
- Preceded by: Rameshwar Bhardwaj
- Succeeded by: Mohan Lal Gupta
- Constituency: Kishanpole

Member of Parliament, Lok Sabha
- In office May 2009 – May 2014
- Preceded by: Girdhari Lal Bhargava
- Succeeded by: Ramcharan Bohra
- Constituency: Jaipur

President of Rajasthan Cricket Association
- In office 28 July 2011 – 2013
- Preceded by: Sanjay Dixit
- Succeeded by: C.P. Joshi

Personal details
- Born: 14 September 1954 (age 71) Jaipur, Rajasthan, India
- Party: Indian National Congress
- Spouse: Smt. Kaushal Joshi
- Children: 1
- Education: M.A. (Sociology), Ph.D, P.G. Diploma (Journalism)
- Alma mater: University of Rajasthan

Mahesh Joshi (born 14 September 1954) is an Indian politician from Rajasthan, affiliated with the Indian National Congress. He served as a Member of Parliament for Jaipur from 2009 to 2014, and as a Member of the Rajasthan Legislative Assembly representing the Hawa Mahal Assembly constituency from 2018 to 2023. During the tenure of the Ashok Gehlot government (2018–2023), he served as the Minister of PHED and Ground Water and held the position of Chief Whip in the Rajasthan Legislative Assembly.

== Early life and education ==
Mahesh Joshi was born on 14 September 1954 in Jaipur, Rajasthan. He completed his Master of Arts (M.A.) in Sociology, Doctor of Philosophy (Ph.D.), and Postgraduate Diploma in Journalism from the University of Rajasthan.

== Political career ==
Joshi was first elected to the Rajasthan Legislative Assembly from the Kishanpole Assembly constituency in 1998. He later served as Member of Parliament for Jaipur from 2009 to 2014. In 2018, he was elected to the Rajasthan Legislative Assembly from the Hawa Mahal Assembly constituency. In 2019, he was appointed the Chief Whip in the Rajasthan Legislative Assembly with the rank of Cabinet Minister.

== Electoral record ==
Election results
Year	Office	Constituency	Candidate (Party)	Votes	%	Opponent (Party)	Opponent Votes	Opponent %	Result	Ref
1998	MLA	Kishanpole	Mahesh Joshi (INC)	62,107	49.89%	Rameshwar Bhardwaj Murtikar (BJP)	39,896	32.05%	Won	
2009	MP	Jaipur	Mahesh Joshi (INC)	3,97,438	48.89%	Ghanshyam Tiwari (BJP )	3,81,339	46.91%	Won	
2014	MP	Jaipur	Mahesh Joshi (INC)	3,24,013	24.99%	Ramcharan Bohara (BJP )	8,63,358	66.58%	Lost	TOI
2018	MLA	Hawa Mahal	Mahesh Joshi (INC)	85,474	50.38%	Surendra Pareek (BJP)	76,192	44.91	Won	TOI
