= Kali Charan Saraf =

Indian politician

Member of the Rajasthan Legislative Assembly
- In office 1985–2008
- Constituency: Johri Bazar

Member of the Rajasthan Legislative Assembly
- In office 2008–Incumbent
- Constituency: Malviya Nagar

Pro tem Speaker of the Rajasthan Legislative Assembly
- In office December 2023 – December 2023

Minister of State (Independent Charge), Rajasthan Government
- In office 2 July 1998 – 30 November 1998

Cabinet Minister, Rajasthan Government
- In office 24 December 2007 – 10 December 2008

Cabinet Minister, Rajasthan Government
- In office 20 December 2013 – 17 December 2018

Personal details
- Born: August 7, 1951 (age 75) Jaipur, Rajasthan, India
- Party: Bharatiya Janata Party
- Spouse: Alka Saraf
- Children: 2 sons, 1 daughter
- Education: B.Com. and LL.B., University of Rajasthan, Jaipur

Kali Charan Saraf (born 7 August 1951) is an Indian politician from Rajasthan. He is a senior leader of the Bharatiya Janata Party and a Member of the Rajasthan Legislative Assembly representing the Malviya Nagar constituency in Jaipur. Saraf has been elected as an MLA eight times, marking a long-standing career in state politics.

He served as Minister for Medical and Health, Medical Education, Ayurveda, and Indian Medical Methods in the Vasundhara Raje cabinet.

In December 2023, Saraf was appointed the Pro tem Speaker of the 16th Rajasthan Legislative Assembly, responsible for administering the oath of office to newly elected members.

== Political career ==
Kali Charan Saraf entered politics through student leadership and was elected President of the Students’ Union at the University of Rajasthan. He has represented multiple constituencies over the years, including Adarsh Nagar before contesting from Malviya Nagar since 2008.

In the 2023 Rajasthan Legislative Assembly election, Saraf won from Malviya Nagar by defeating Indian National Congress candidate Archana Sharma.

== Electoral record ==
Election results
Year	Office	Constituency	Votes	%	Opponent	Opponent Votes	Opponent %	Result	Ref
1985	MLA	Johri Bazar	28,198	42.27	Takiudin Ahmed (INC)	25,646	38.45	Won	
1990	MLA	Johri Bazar	61,132	58.86	Syed Ahmad Khan (INC)	36,257	34.91	Won	
1993	MLA	Johri Bazar	71,017	56.16	Raj Kumar Kala (INC)	47,685	37.71	Won	
1998	MLA	Johri Bazar	67,095	46.69	Taqiuddin Ahmed (INC)	70,208	48.86	Lost	
2003	MLA	Johri Bazar	88,016	54.14	Shah Ikramuddin (INC)	62,277	38.31	Won	
2008	MLA	Malviya Nagar	62,011	54.18	Rajiv Arora (INC)	44,453	38.84	Won	
2013	MLA	Malviya Nagar	89,974	65.02	Dr Archana Sharma (INC)	41,256	29.82	Won	TOI
2018	MLA	Malviya Nagar	70,221	48.17	Dr Archana Sharma (INC)	68,517	47.00	Won	TOI
2023	MLA	Malviya Nagar	92,506	60.62	Dr Archana Sharma (INC)	57,012	37.36	Won	TOI
