= Balmukund Acharya =

Indian politician and spiritual leader (born 1976)

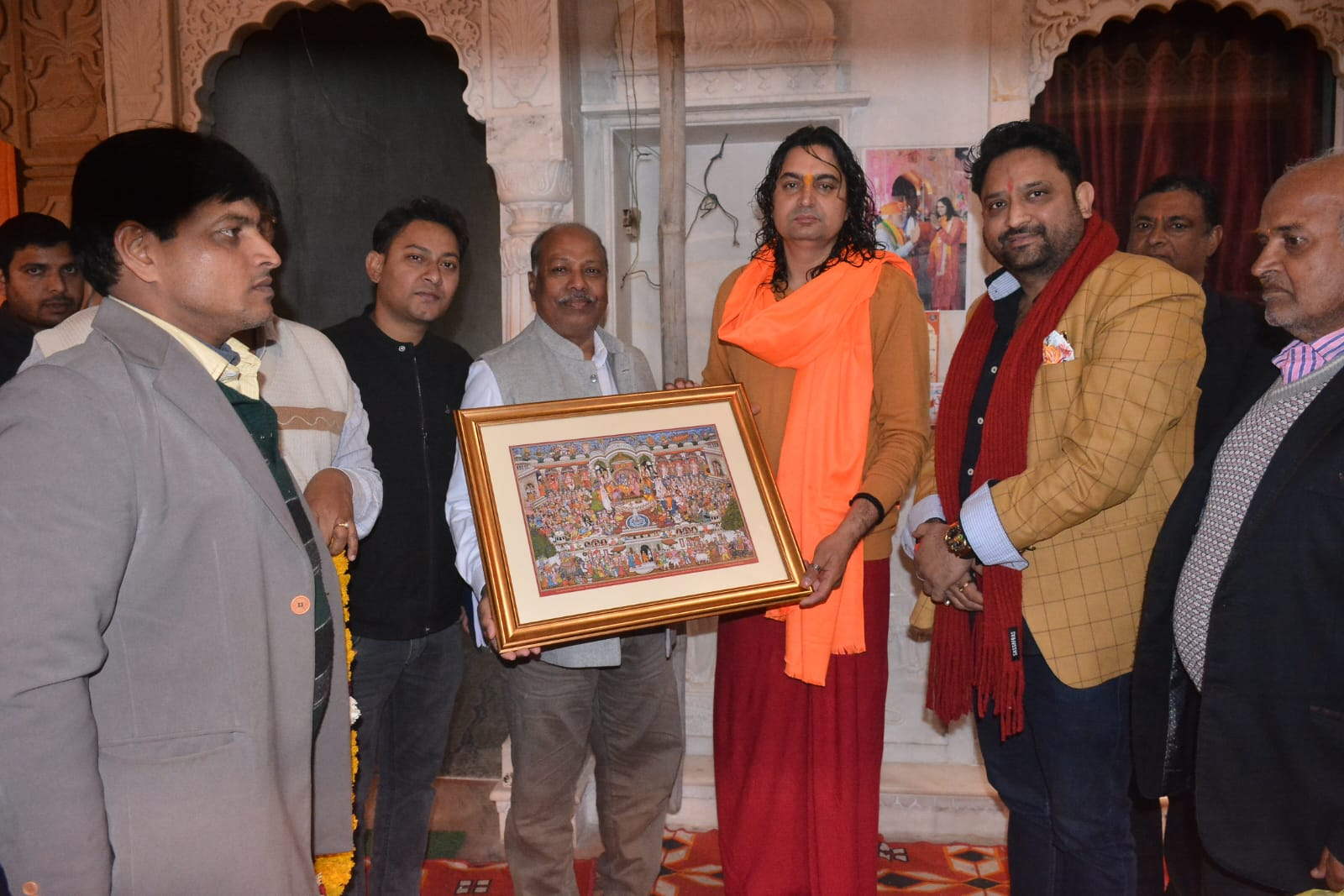

Rajasthan Legislative Assembly
- Incumbent
- Assumed office 2023
- Preceded by: Mahesh Joshi
- Constituency: Hawa Mahal, Jaipur

Personal details
- Born: 28 December 1976 (age 49) Jaipur, India
- Party: Bharatiya Janata Party

Balmukund Acharya (born 1 January 1976) is an Indian politician currently serving as a member of the Rajasthan Legislative Assembly representing the Hawa Mahal constituency, Jaipur. He is a member of the Bharatiya Janata Party.

== Personal life ==
He is Acharya of Hathoj Dham Jaipur, the sect of Hinduism.

== Political career ==
Following the 2023 Rajasthan Legislative Assembly election, he was elected as an MLA from the Hawa Mahal, Jaipur.

== Election results ==
2023 Hawa Mahal Assembly Election Results
Year	Constituency	Candidate	Party	Votes	Percentage	Result
2023	Hawa Mahal	Balmukund Acharya	Bharatiya Janata Party	95,989	49.18%	Elected
2023	Hawa Mahal	R.R. Tiwari	Indian National Congress	95,015	48.68%	1st Runner Up
2023	Hawa Mahal	NOTA	None of the Above	1,463	0.75%	N/A

== Controversies ==
Acharya has been accused of making inflammatory statements promoting Hindu nationalism and inciting violence against minority communities. His comments on non-vegetarian food near religious sites and closure of meat stalls have sparked protests and accusations of religious intolerance.

Acharya argues that wearing the hijab disrupts school discipline and sets a precedent for students wearing clothes representing various religions. This stance is interpreted by some as an attempt to impose Hindu values and restrict the religious freedom of Muslim students. Later, Muslim students gheraoed the police station, demanding that the MLA stop "vitiating the atmosphere in schools" and apologise for his actions.
