= Kishanpole Assembly constituency =

Legislative Assembly constituency in Rajasthan State, India

Coordinates: 26.92°N 75.82°E

Kishanpole
- Constituency No. 52 for the Rajasthan Legislative Assembly

Constituency details
- Country: India
- Region: North India
- State: Rajasthan
- District: Jaipur
- Lok Sabha constituency: Jaipur
- Established: 1957
- Total electors: 192,664
- Reservation: None

Member of Legislative Assembly
- 16th Rajasthan Legislative Assembly
- Incumbent Aminuddin Kagzi
- Party: Indian National Congress
- Elected year: 2018

Kishanpole Assembly constituency is one of the 200 Legislative Assembly constituencies of Rajasthan state in India. It is in Jaipur district and is a segment of Jaipur Lok Sabha seat.

== Members of the Legislative Assembly ==
Year	Member	Party
1957	Chandra Kala	Indian National Congress
1962	Bhairon Singh Shekhawat	Jana Sangh
1967	Bhairon Singh Shekhawat	Bharatiya Jana Sangh
1972	Sriram Gotewala	Indian National Congress
1977	Girdhari Lal Bhargava	Janata Party
1980	Ram Gotewala	Indian National Congress
1985	Girdhari Lal Bhargava	Bharatiya Janata Party
1990	Rameshwar Bhardwaj	Bharatiya Janata Party
1993	Rameshwar Bhardwaj	Bharatiya Janata Party
1998	Mahesh Joshi	Indian National Congress
2003	Mohan Lal Gupta	Bharatiya Janata Party
2008	Mohan Lal Gupta	Bharatiya Janata Party
2013	Mohan Lal Gupta	Bharatiya Janata Party
2018	Aminuddin Kagzi	Indian National Congress
2023	Aminuddin Kagzi	Indian National Congress

== Election results ==
=== 2023 ===
2023 Rajasthan Legislative Assembly election: Kishanpole
Party	Candidate	Votes	%	±%
INC	Amin Kagzi	76,611	51.46	+1.51
BJP	Chandra Manohar Batwara	69,555	46.72	+2.92
NOTA	None of the above	1,026	0.69	+0.16
Majority		7,056	4.74	−1.41
Turnout		148,869	77.27	+5.37
INC hold		Swing		

=== 2018 ===
Rajasthan Legislative Assembly Election, 2018: Kishanpole
Party	Candidate	Votes	%	±%
INC	Aminuddin Kagzi	71,189	49.95	
BJP	Mohan Lal Gupta	62,419	43.8	
NOTA	None of the above	754	0.53	
Majority		8,770	6.15	
Turnout		142,509	71.9	

=== 1962 ===
- Bheron Singh (JS): 19,188 votes
- Mahendra Singh (SWA): 12,487

== See also ==
- List of constituencies of Rajasthan Legislative Assembly
- Jaipur district
