= Gopal Sharma (Indian politician) =

Indian politician (born 1959)

Member of 16th Rajasthan Assembly
- Incumbent
- Assumed office 15 December 2023
- Preceded by: Pratap Singh Khachariyawas
- Constituency: Civil Lines

Personal details
- Born: March 5, 1959 (age 67)
- Party: Bharatiya Janata Party
- Occupation: Politician

Gopal Sharma (born 5 March 1959) is an Indian politician serving as a member of the 16th Rajasthan Assembly, he is a member of the Bharatiya Janata Party, and represents the Civil Lines Assembly constituency from Jaipur district.

== Political career ==
Following the 2023 Rajasthan Legislative Assembly election, he was elected as MLA from the Civil Lines assembly constituency, defeating Pratap Singh Khachariyawas, the candidate from the Indian National Congress (INC), by a margin of 28,329 votes.

== Election results ==
=== 2023 Civil Lines Assembly election ===
Candidate	Party	Result	Votes	Vote share
Gopal Sharma	Bharatiya Janata Party (BJP)	Elected	98,661	56.88%
Pratap Singh Khachariyawas	Indian National Congress (INC)	Runner-up	70,332	40.55%
Archit Gupta	Aam Aadmi Party (AAP)	–	1,385	0.80%
