= Ramcharan Bohra =

Indian politician

Member of Parliament, Lok Sabha
- In office 17 May 2014 – 4 June 2024
- Preceded by: Mahesh Joshi
- Succeeded by: Manju Sharma (politician)
- Constituency: Jaipur

Personal details
- Born: 1 July 1956 (age 69) Jaipur, Rajasthan, India
- Party: Bharatiya Janata Party
- Spouse: Lalita Bohra
- Children: 2
- Occupation: Agriculturist
- Website: http://ramcharanbohra.com

Ramcharan Bohra (born 1 July 1956) is an Indian politician who has been representing the Jaipur constituency of Rajasthan in the Lok Sabha since 2014. He belongs to the Bharatiya Janata Party.

In 1995, Bohra was elected as zilla parishad of the Jaipur district. In 2014, he was elected to the Lok Sabha by defeating Mahesh Joshi of the Indian National Congress party. Since then, he has been a member of various parliamentary committees.

== Early life ==
Bohra was born 1 July 1956 at Jaipur, Rajasthan to a Brahmin family. He studied only till higher secondary schooling.

== Political career ==
=== Early political career ===
In 1983, Bohra joined the Rashtriya Swayamsevak Sangh. Between 1995 and 2000, he served as zilla pramukh of Jaipur district.

=== 16th Lok Sabha ===
On 17 May 2014, Bohra was elected to the Lok Sabha as a candidate of the Bharatiya Janata Party from Jaipur constituency after defeating Mahesh Joshi of the Indian National Congress, his nearest rival by a margin of approximately 539,000 votes. His win was credited to the erstwhile Modi wave and the factionalism within the Congress party. He won by the largest margin in the state of Rajasthan in the general election. After getting elected, he completed all the formalities to nominate Jaipur as a potential Smart City. He started meeting citizens at his house to remove their grievances. He utilised ₹20.05 million (US$240,000) from his MPLADS fund to buy an Auto Hooper car and jetting machine to improve the city's garbage collection system. Funds were also utilised to build public toilets and bus stands in his city. In order to reduce pollution, he made the government approve a ₹1,600 million (US$19 million) water pollution prevention plant.

During Bohra's first stint in the parliament, he served as a member of a standing committee on urban development and of standing committee on tourism, transport and culture. He was also a member of the consultative committee for the ministry of railways. Bohra asked 312 questions and participated in 110 debates in the Lok Sabha.

=== 17th Lok Sabha ===
In 2019, the party renominated Bohra for the upcoming election. He won for the second time on 23 May, and defeated his nearest rival, Jyoti Khandelwal of the Congress party by a margin of 430,626 votes.

== Personal life ==
On 9 March 1974, Bohra married Lalita Bohra. They have two sons.
