= Arun Chaturvedi =

Indian politician

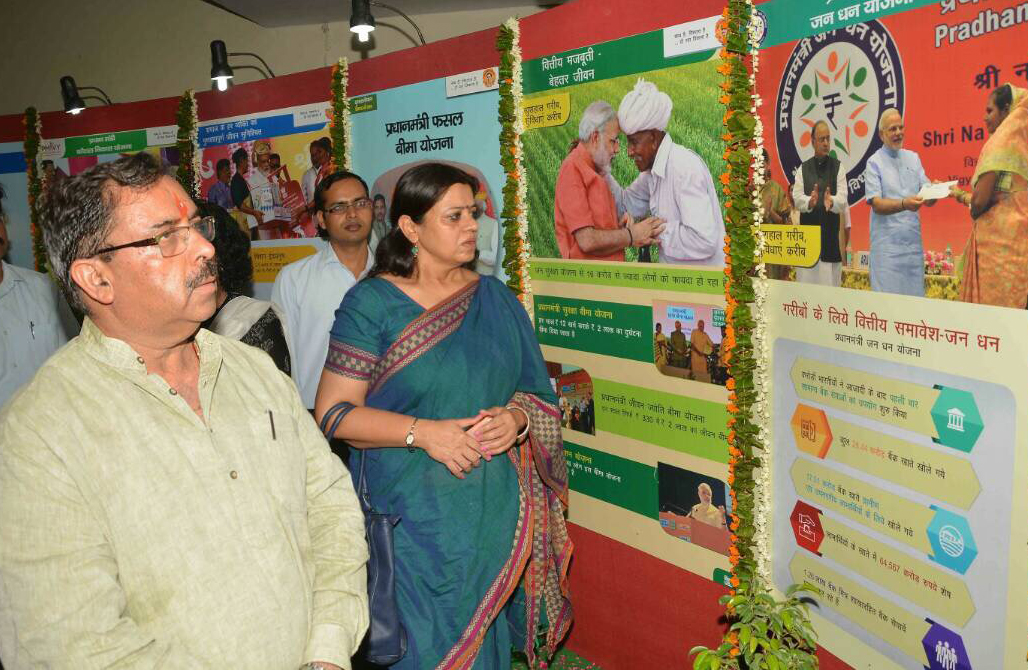
- Chaturvedi visiting after inaugurating the "Saath Hai Vishwaas Hai, Ho Raha Vikas Hai" Exhibition of DAVP, in Jaipur

Minister of Social Justice and Empowerment, General Administration, Motor Garage, Minority Affairs, Printing and Stationery, Estate Department, Government of Rajasthan
- In office 2013–2018

Member of Legislative Assembly

Personal details
- Born: 25 May 1961 (age 65) Bharatpur, Rajasthan, India
- Party: Bharatiya Janata Party
- Children: 2, Akshay Chaturvedi, Anima Chaturvedi
- Parent: Dr. P.L. Chaturvedi
- Education: University of Rajasthan
- Profession: Politician
- Website: aapkiawaz.in/about/

Dr. Arun Chaturvedi is an India politician of Bharatiya Janata Party in 2013 Rajasthan Legislative Assembly election and has been minister of Social Justice and Empowerment, General Administration, Motor Garage, Minority Affairs, Printing and Stationery, Estate Department, Government of Rajasthan, Jaipur.

== Education ==
- 1978 Higher Secondary Education, Adarsh Vidya Mandir, Adarsh Nagar, Jaipur.
- 1981 Bachelor of Commerce, Commerce College Jaipur and M.Com in Commerce in 1985 (gold medalist).
- Bachelor of Law in 1986, University of Rajasthan, Jaipur. He has Ph.D.

== Political career ==
He worked as Professor for five years from 1985. Bhartiya Janta Yuva Morcha as State Minister and State Vice President from 1988–1998. He was in charge of the newly formed Media Cell in BJP in 1991. He received the title of director in 1992. He served as the state secretary of the Bharatiya Janata Party, Rajasthan from 1998–2004. He has been a permanent advocate of the Central Government in the state from 2003–2004, Rajasthan High Court, Jaipur Bench, Jaipur has been a permanent advocate in various departments. He held the post of training in-charge of Bharatiya Janata Party Organization in 2004. He held the responsibility of the State General Secretary of Bharatiya Janata Party, Rajasthan from 2004 to 2009. He held the responsibility of State President of Bharatiya Janata Party from 2009 to 2012. In 2013 he won from the Civil Lines Constituency and was Minister in Government of Rajasthan for Social Justice and Empowerment and six other departments. In 2019 he was appointed National Co-Convener of BJP-Membership Drive by Shri Amit Shah (National President-BJP). He is the member of Brij Bhasha Academy.

== Membership of Legislative Assembly ==
- 2013-18 Member Rajasthan Legislative Assembly from Civil Lines Vidhansabha.
