= Pratap Singh Khachariyawas =

Indian politician

Minister of Food & Civil Supplies and Consumer affairs Government of Rajasthan
- In office November 2021 – 2023
- Preceded by: Ramesh Chand Meena
- Succeeded by: Sumit Godara

Minister of Transport, Soldier Welfare, Government of Rajasthan
- In office 24 December 2018 – November 2021
- Governor: Kalraj Mishra
- Chief Minister: Ashok Gehlot
- Constituency: Civil Lines, Jaipur

Member of the Rajasthan Legislative Assembly
- In office 2018–2023
- Succeeded by: Gopal Sharma
- Constituency: Civil Lines
- In office 2008–2013
- Succeeded by: Arun Chaturvedi
- Constituency: Civil Lines

Personal details
- Born: 16 May 1969 (age 57) Jodhpur, Rajasthan, India
- Party: Indian National Congress
- Spouse: Neeraj Kanwar (m. 2000)
- Children: 2 sons
- Parent(s): Laxman Singh Shekhawat (father); Himmat Kanwar (mother)
- Education: MA in political science, LLB Rajasthan University
- Profession: Politician; Social Worker
- Website: www.pratapsinghkhachariyawas.in

Pratap Singh Khachariyawas (प्रताप सिंह खाचरियावास; born 16 May 1969) is an Indian National Congress politician, who was former Cabinet Minister of Food & Civil Supplies and Consumer affairs in Government of Rajasthan. He is also one of the Cabinet Ministers in the government, under Ashok Gehlot. He has held the post of the spokesperson of Rajasthan Pradesh Congress Committee and president of Jaipur Congress since 2015, previously he served as a Member of the Legislative Assembly of Civil Lines.

== Early life ==
He belongs to the Rajput community. He was born on 16 May 1969 in Jodhpur. He is the son of Laxman Singh Shekhawat and Himmat Kanwar and completed his school education from Adarsh Vidya Mandir, Kishangarh Renewal and later from Tagore Vidya Bhavan, Jaipur 9th to 11th studied in Maheshwari Higher Secondary School, Jaipur. Apart from this, he has completed MA in political science and LLB, Rajasthan college BA and MA from Rajasthan University Jaipur.

== Personal life ==
He is the nephew of ex-vice president Bhairon Singh Shekhawat. He is married to Neeraj Kanwar and has two sons Aditya Vardhan and Krishna Vardhan. Currently he is living at M-13 Madram Pura Civil Lines, Jaipur with his family.

== Political career ==
He started his political career as an independent President of University of Rajasthan (1992–93); He was also a member of legislative assembly from Civil Lines, Jaipur (2008–13). Currently, he is cabinet minister in Rajasthan government and state spokesperson of Rajasthan Pradesh Congress Committee and president of Jaipur.

== Membership of Legislative Assembly ==
- 2008–13, member Rajasthan Legislative Assembly from Civil Lines Vidhan Sabha.
- 2018- 2023, member Rajasthan legislative assembly from Civil Lines Vidhan Sabha.
