= Ashok Parnami =

Indian politician

President of Bharatiya Janata Party, Rajasthan
- In office 12 February 2014 – 29 April 2018
- Preceded by: Vasundhara Raje
- Succeeded by: Madan Lal Saini

Member of the Legislative Assembly, Rajasthan
- In office December 2008 – December 2018
- Constituency: Adarsh Nagar, Jaipur

Personal details
- Born: 4 January 1954 (age 71); Jaipur, Rajasthan, India
- Political party: Bharatiya Janata Party

Ashok Parnami (born 4 January 1954) is an Indian politician. He has served as State president of Bharatiya Janata Party Rajasthan and mayor of Jaipur.

== Political experience ==
Active member of Bharatiya Janata Party (BJP). Former MLA, Adarsh Nagar Constituency Area, Jaipur. Former State Treasurer, BJP Rajasthan. General Secretary, Jaipur City, BJP Mayor, Jaipur Nagar Nigam (2004–2008).
