= Nawal Kishore Sharma =

Indian politician

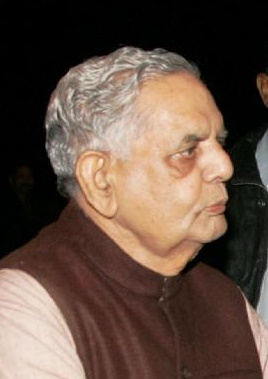

Governor of Gujarat
- In office 24 July 2004 – 29 July 2009
- Chief Minister: Narendra Modi
- Preceded by: Balram Jakhar
- Succeeded by: S. C. Jamir

Union Minister of State (Independent Charge) for Petroleum and Natural Gas
- In office 31 December 1984 – 20 January 1986; Petroleum, until 25 September 1985
- Prime Minister: Rajiv Gandhi
- Succeeded by: Chandrashekhar Singh

Personal details
- Born: 5 July 1925 Dausa, Jaipur, Rajasthan
- Died: 8 October 2012 (aged 87)
- Party: Indian National Congress

Nawal Kishore Sharma (Dausa, Jaipur, Rajasthan, 5 July 1925 – 8 October 2012) was an Indian politician, who served as Governor of Gujarat state from July 2004 to July 2009.

== Biography ==
His father's name was Pandit Mool Chand Sharma. He was married to Munni Devi and had three sons.

He was educated at Maharaja College, Jaipur and Agra University, Agra.

== Previous political experience ==
Prior to Sharma's appointment as governor, he was a general secretary of the Indian National Congress Party, a position to which he was appointed in 2003. He was also the Speaker of the Rajasthan Assembly from 1998 to 2003.

He was the petroleum minister in 1985 under Congress government.

== Literary, artistic and scientific accomplishments ==
• Editor of 'Socialist India' and 'Socialist Bharat'; Columnist

• Honoured with Honorary D.Litt. for his Gandhian ideology and constructive work by Mahatma Gandhi Kashi Vidyapeeth University, Varanasi in 1998.

• Has worked as Secretary of Gandhi Smriti (Rajghat) for nearly three years.

• Member of the Board of Rural Electrification Corporation, Govt. of India for Jaipur District Rural Electrification which was a pioneer programme for Rajasthan and the success of the programme in this District led to large scale rural electrification in many districts of Rajasthan.

Social and Cultural Activities:

• Upliftment of Adivasi people and removal of untouchability.

• Organised convention for non-resident Rajasthanis living in and outside the country.

• Organised national and international sports events Kavi Sammelan and Mushara to celebrate the golden jubilee celebrations.

== Special interests ==
He participated in the freedom movement during his student life and had great interest in development of Khadi and Gramodhyog (village industry) and Cooperative Movement, tribal welfare and was associated with the activities of Rajasthan Adim Jati Sevak Sangh and has also long been associated with the activities of Harijan Sevak Sangh which looks after upliftment of Scheduled Castes. He took keen interest in creating awareness of education amongst the minorities and was associated with a few minority educational institutions. He was concerned with the unemployment problem of the youth more particularly rural and through khadi institutions he wanted to encourage village artisan and rural youth to set up cottage industries. He has been associated with Khadi Movement and constructive work for more than 40–50 years. He held a responsible position in the Sanchalak Mandal of Kshetriya Khadi Samiti, Dausa for nearly 40 years. This is one of the pioneer khadi institutions in the country. He was also an active member of the Sanchalak Mandal of Udyog Mandir, Amber. He had also keen interest in Indian culture and its development and Sanskrit language.

As member of Parliament, he visited various countries of the world including U.K., U.S.A., Argentina, Brazil, Vietnam, Uganda, Egypt, Greece, Spain, Afghanistan, Bangladesh, Mauritius, China, South African countries, Cuba, Hungary, Switzerland, Germany and almost all States of former USSR. He attended as the Leader of the Indian delegation in Norway in a conference which was organized by UNESCO and also visited Sweden and Denmark.

Preceded by Balram Jakhar	Governor of Gujarat; July 2004 – July 2009	Succeeded by S.C. Jamir
