= Bharatpur Lok Sabha constituency =

Lok Sabha constituency in Rajasthan

Coordinates: 27.22°N 77.49°E

Bharatpur
- Lok Sabha constituency
- Interactive Map Outlining Bharatpur Lok Sabha Constituency

Constituency details
- Country: India
- Region: North India
- State: Rajasthan
- Assembly constituencies: Kathumar; Kaman; Nagar; Deeg-Kumher; Bharatpur; Nadbai; Weir; Bayana
- Established: 1951
- Reservation: SC

Member of Parliament
- 18th Lok Sabha
- Incumbent Sanjana Jatav
- Party: Indian National Congress
- Elected year: 2024

Bharatpur (Hindi pronunciation: [bʱəɾət̪.pʊɾ]) is one of the 25 Lok Sabha (parliamentary) constituencies in Rajasthan state in India.

== Assembly segments ==
Presently, Bharatpur Lok Sabha constituency comprises eight Legislative Assembly segments. These are:

#	Name	District	Member	Party	2024 Lead
69	Kathumar (SC)	Alwar	Ramesh Khinchi	BJP	INC
70	Kaman	Deeg	Nauksham Chaudhary	BJP	INC
71	Nagar	Deeg	Jawahar Singh Bedham	BJP	INC
72	Deeg-Kumher	Deeg	Shailesh Singh	BJP	INC
73	Bharatpur	Bharatpur	Subhash Garg	RLD	BJP
74	Nadbai	Bharatpur	Jagat Singh	BJP	BJP
75	Weir (SC)	Bharatpur	Bahadur Singh Koli	BJP	INC
76	Bayana (SC)	Bharatpur	Ritu Banawat	IND	INC

== Members of Lok Sabha ==
Year	Member	Party
1952	Maharaja Girraj Sharan Singh	Independent
1957	Raj Bahadur	Indian National Congress
1962	Raj Bahadur	Indian National Congress
1967	Maharaja Brijendra Singh	Independent
1971	Raj Bahadur	Indian National Congress
1977	Ram Kishan	Janata Party
1980	Rajesh Pilot	Indian National Congress
1984	Kunwar Natwar Singh	Indian National Congress
1989	Maharaja Vishvendra Singh	Janata Dal
1991	Krishnendra Kaur	Bharatiya Janata Party
1996	Maharani Divya Singh	Bharatiya Janata Party
1998	Kunwar Natwar Singh	Indian National Congress
1999	Maharaja Vishvendra Singh	Bharatiya Janata Party
2004	Maharaja Vishvendra Singh	Bharatiya Janata Party
2009	Ratan Singh Jatav	Indian National Congress
2014	Bahadur Koli	Bharatiya Janata Party
2019	Ranjeeta Koli	Bharatiya Janata Party
2024	Sanjana Jatav	Indian National Congress

== Election results ==
=== 2024 ===
2024 Indian general election: Bharatpur
Party	Candidate	Votes	%	±%
INC	Sanjana Jatav	579,890	51.05	▲17.14
BJP	Ramswaroop Koli	5,27,907	46.47	▼15.15
BSP	Anjila Jatav	9,508	0.84	▼1.91
Independent	Aneeta	5,119	0.45	N/A
Independent	Purushottam Lal	2,747	0.24	N/A
Independent	Pushpendar Kumar	2,386	0.21	N/A
Majority		52,983	4.58	▼23.19
Turnout		11,36,014	53.46	▼5.65
INC gain from BJP		Swing	▲17.14	

=== 2019 ===
2019 Indian general elections: Bharatpur
Party	Candidate	Votes	%	±%
BJP	Ranjeeta Koli	707,992	61.62	
INC	Abhijeet Kumar Jatav	3,89,593	33.91	
BSP	Suraj Pradhan Jatav	31,615	2.75	
API	Mangal Ram Godra	5,715	0.50	
NOTA	None of the Above	5,638	0.49	
Margin of victory		3,18,399	27.77	
Turnout		11,46,797	59.11	+2.11
BJP hold		Swing		

=== 2014 ===
2014 Indian general elections: Bharatpur
Party	Candidate	Votes	%	±%
BJP	Bahadur Singh Koli	5,79,825	60.38	
INC	Dr. Suresh Jatav	3,34,357	34.82	
BSP	Mahendar Kumar Jatav	22,090	2.30	
AAP	Gopal Paharia	7,013	0.73	
Margin of victory		2,45,468	25.50	
Turnout		9,63,675	57.00	+17.98
BJP gain from INC		Swing		

=== 2009 ===
2009 Indian general elections: Bharatpur
Party	Candidate	Votes	%	±%
INC	Ratan Singh Jatav	301,434	53.73	
BJP	Khemchand	2,19,980	39.21	
BSP	Muhar Singh	23,178	4.13	
Independent	Raman Lal	4,176	0.74	
SP	Dr. Padam Singh	3,569	0.25	
Margin of victory		81,454	14.53	
Turnout		5,60,698	39.02	
INC hold		Swing		

=== 2004 ===
2004 Indian general elections: Bharatpur
Party	Candidate	Votes	%	±%
BJP	Vishvendra Singh	3,19,904	55.44	
INC	Ved Prakash	2,08,555	36.14	
BSP	Mandleshwar Singh	38,723	6.71	
SP	Khursheed Ahamad	3,963	0.68	
Independent	DR.Samundra Singh	3,117	0.54	
Independent	Shiv Kumar Singh	1495	0.25	
Independent	Jaikam Deen	1230	0.21	
Margin of victory		111349	19.30	
Turnout		576987	48.54	
BJP hold		Swing		

=== 1999 ===
1999 Indian general elections: Bharatpur
Party	Candidate	Votes	%	±%
BJP	Vishvendra Singh	2,77,460	48.37	
INC	Jagat Singh	1,80,442	31.45	
BSP	Nasru Khan	81,628	14.23	
SP	PT. Ram Kishan	18,941	3.30	
Lok Shakti	Ravindra Kumar Pradhan	4555	0.79	
JP	Khurshid Ahmed	3163	0.55	
Independent	Brij Kishore	2957	0.52	
Independent	Man Singh	2120	0.37	
Independent	Harbir Singh	1381	0.24	
Ajeya Bharat Party	Dayaram	311	0.05	
Shiv Sena (1966–2022)	Jagdish	267	0.05	
NCP	Chandar Singh	244	0.04	
Independent	Shiv Kumar Singh Sinsinwar	188	0.03	
Margin of victory		97,018	16.91	
Turnout		5,73,657	54.45	
BJP hold		Swing		

== See also ==
- Bharatpur district
- List of constituencies of the Lok Sabha
