= Ramesh Khinchi =

Indian politician

Ramesh Chand Khinchi

Member of the Rajasthan Legislative Assembly
- Incumbent
- Assumed office 3 December 2023
- Preceded by: Babulal Bairwa
- Constituency: Kathumar

Personal details
- Party: Bharatiya Janata Party

Ramesh Chand Khinchi (born 3 January 1957) is an Indian politician from Rajasthan. He is a three time member of the Rajasthan Legislative Assembly from Kathumar Assembly constituency, which is reserved for Scheduled Caste community, in Alwar district. He won the 2023 Rajasthan Legislative Assembly election representing the Bharatiya Janata Party.

== Early life and education ==
Khinchi is from Akhaigarh village, Nadbai tehsil, Bharatpur district, Rajasthan. He is the son of Kishan Lal Khinchi. He is a graduate. He married Uganti Devi in 1976 and together they have two sons and a daughter.

== Career ==
Khinchi won from Kathumar Assembly constituency representing the Bharatiya Janata Party in the 2023 Rajasthan Legislative Assembly election. He polled 79,756 votes and defeated his nearest rival, Sanjana Jatav of the Indian National Congress, by a margin of 409 votes. He was first elected as an MLA winning the 1998 Rajasthan Legislative Assembly election from Kathamur representing the Indian National Congress. He retained the seat for Congress in the 2003 Rajasthan Legislative Assembly election. After three more elections, he regained the seat after contesting on the BJP ticket. He lost the 2018 Assembly election as an independent candidate and the 2013 election on Congress ticket to Mangal Ram of the BJP.
