= Bharatpur, Rajasthan Assembly constituency =

Constituency of the Rajasthan Legislative Assembly in India

Coordinates: 27.22°N 77.49°E

Bharatpur
- Constituency No. 73 for the Rajasthan Legislative Assembly

Constituency details
- Country: India
- Region: North India
- State: Rajasthan
- District: Bharatpur
- Lok Sabha constituency: Bharatpur
- Established: 1951
- Total electors: 279,032
- Reservation: None

Member of Legislative Assembly
- 16th Rajasthan Legislative Assembly
- Incumbent Subhash Garg
- Party: RLD
- Alliance: NDA
- Elected year: 2023

Bharatpur Assembly constituency is one of the 200 Legislative Assembly constituencies of Rajasthan state in India. It is in Bharatpur district and in Bharatpur Lok Sabha Constituency.

== Members of the Legislative Assembly ==
Year	Member	Party
1951	Hari Dutt	Krishikar Lok Party
1957	Hoti Lal	Independent
1962	Natthi Singh	Independent
1967	Natthi Singh	Samyukta Socialist Party
1972	Brijendra Singh	Bharatiya Jana Sangh
1977	Suresh Kumar	Janata Party
1980	Raj Bahadur	Indian National Congress (U)
1985	Girraj Prasad Tiwari	Indian National Congress
1990	Ram Kishan	Janata Dal
1993	R. P. Sharma	Indian National Congress
1998	R. P. Sharma	Indian National Congress
2003	Vijay Bansal	Indian National Lok Dal
2008	Vijay Bansal	Bharatiya Janata Party
2013	Vijay Bansal	Bharatiya Janata Party
2018	Subhash Garg	Rashtriya Lok Dal
2023	Subhash Garg	Rashtriya Lok Dal

== Election results ==
=== 2023 ===
Rajasthan Legislative Assembly Election, 2023: Bharatpur
Party	Candidate	Votes	%	±%
RLD	Subhash Garg	81,878	43.26	+12.83
BJP	Vijay Bansal	76,491	40.41	+19.02
BSP	Girish Chaudhary	25,231	13.33	+4.69
NOTA	None of the above	1,472	0.78	+0.39
Majority		5,387	2.85	−6.19
Turnout		189,277	67.83	−0.15
RLD hold		Swing		

=== 2018 ===
2018 Rajasthan Legislative Assembly election: Bharatpur
Party	Candidate	Votes	%	±%
RLD	Subhash Garg	52,869	30.43	
BJP	Vijay Bansal	37,159	21.39	
Bharat Vahini Party	Girdhari Tiwari	35,407	20.38	
Independent	Dalveer Singh	24,258	13.96	
BSP	Jasveer Singh	15,018	8.64	
AAP	Sanjeev Gupta	2,169	1.25	
NOTA	None of the above	686	0.39	
Majority		15,710	9.04	
Turnout		173,752	67.98	
RLD gain from BJP		Swing		

=== 2003 ===
2003 Rajasthan Legislative Assembly election: Bharatpur
Party	Candidate	Votes	%	±%
INLD	Vijay Bansal (Pappu)	39,080	35.18	
INC	R. P. Sharma	21,717	19.55	
BSP	Akhilesh Lavaniya	19,243	17.32	
BJP	Gurdeep Singh	18,073	16.27	
SP	Ram Kishan	6,893	6.20	
Majority		17,363	15.63	
Turnout		111,097	61.37	
INLD gain from INC		Swing		

== See also ==
- List of constituencies of the Rajasthan Legislative Assembly
- Bharatpur district
