= Vishvendra Singh =

Indian politician and titular Maharaja of Bharatpur (born 1962)

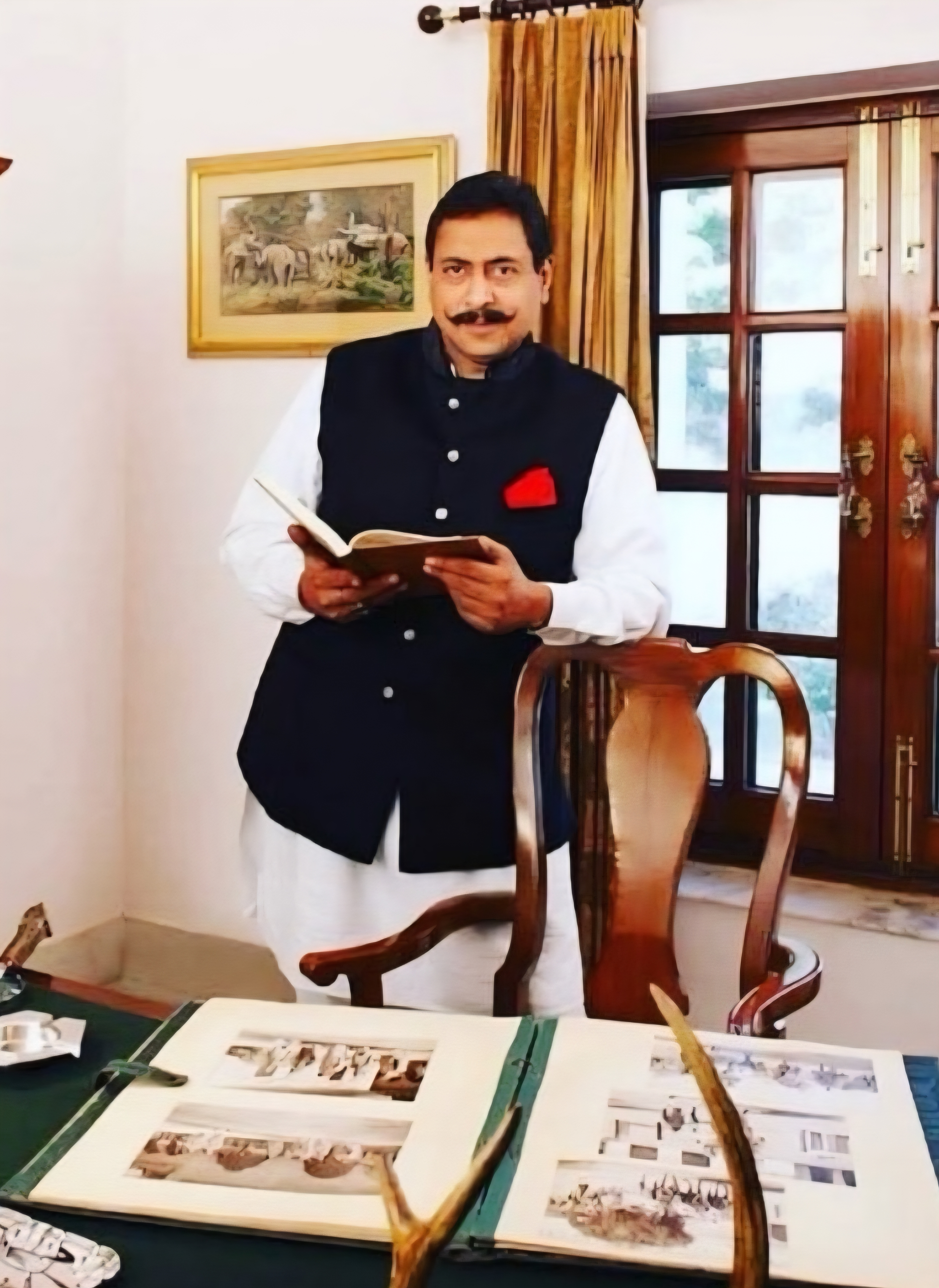
- Maharaja Vishvendra Singh

Cabinet Minister Government of Rajasthan
- In office 21 November 2021 – December 2023
- Departments: Tourism; Civil aviation
- Succeeded by: Gautam Kumar

Minister of Tourism Government of Rajasthan
- In office 25 December 2018 – 14 July 2020
- Chief Minister: Ashok Gehlot
- Deputy Chief Minister: Sachin Pilot
- Preceded by: Krishnendra Kaur (Deepa), BJP

Minister of Devasthan Government of Rajasthan
- In office 25 December 2018 – 14 July 2020
- Chief Minister: Ashok Gehlot
- Deputy Chief Minister: Sachin Pilot
- Preceded by: Raj Kumar Rinwa, BJP

Member of the Rajasthan Legislative Assembly
- In office 11 December 2018 – 2023
- Chief Minister: Ashok Gehlot
- Speaker: C. P. Joshi
- Succeeded by: Dr. Shailesh Singh, BJP
- In office 8 December 2013 – 11 December 2018
- Chief Minister: Vasundhra Raje
- Speaker: Kailash Chandra Meghwal
- Preceded by: Digamber Singh, BJP
- Constituency: Deeg-Kumher

Member of Parliament Lok Sabha
- In office 2004–2009
- Prime Minister: Dr. Manmohan Singh
- Lok Sabha Speaker: Somnath Chatterjee
- Succeeded by: Ratan Singh, INC
- Constituency: Bharatpur
- In office 1999–2004
- Prime Minister: Atal Bihari Vajpayee
- Lok Sabha Speaker: Manohar Joshi
- Preceded by: K. Natwar Singh, INC
- Constituency: Bharatpur
- In office 1989–1991
- Prime Minister: V. P. Singh
- Lok Sabha Speaker: Rabi Ray
- Preceded by: K. Natwar Singh, INC
- Succeeded by: Krishnendra Kaur (Deepa), BJP
- Constituency: Bharatpur

Titular Maharaja of Bharatpur
- Incumbent
- Assumed office 8 July 1995
- Preceded by: Brijendra Singh
- Constituency: Bharatpur

Personal details
- Born: 23 June 1962 (age 63) Bharatpur, Rajasthan, India
- Party: Indian National Congress 2008-present,
- Other political affiliations: Bhartiya Janata Party 1991-2008; Janata Dal Before 1991
- Spouse: Maharani Divya Singh
- Children: Yuvraj Anirudh Singh of Bharatpur
- Parent: Maharaja Brijendra Singh (father)

Vishvendra Singh (born 23 June 1962) is the titular Maharaja of Bharatpur and a politician who has served as the cabinet minister of tourism and civil aviation in Government of Rajasthan from November 2021 to December 2023.

He served as the Minister of Tourism and Devasthan in the Government of Rajasthan from December 2018 to July 2020. He was elected to the Rajasthan Legislative Assembly for three terms representing Nadbai in 1993 and Deeg-Kumher in 2013 and 2018. He was also elected to the Lok Sabha representing Bharatpur in 1989, 1999 and 2004.

== Early life ==
Singh, who hails from the Sinsinwar Jat clan of Bharatpur, was born into royalty on June 23, 1962, at Moti Mahal in Bharatpur. He is the son of Maharaja Sawai Brijendra Singh, the 13th Maharaja of Bharatpur.

== Political career ==
Singh's political career began with the Indian National Congress and became Zila Pramukh in 1988 and then he joined Janata Dal in 1989 and became member of the Lok Sabha for the first time after which he joined the Bharatiya Janata Party in 1991. He served as a Member of Parliament (MP) in the Lok Sabha representing Bharatpur for three terms from 1989 to 1991 as a member of Janata Dal, 1999 to 2009 as a member of the Bhartiya Janata Party. During his tenure, he was part of the Committee on Science and Technology, Environment and Forests from 1999 to 2004, and the Committee on Personnel, Public Grievances, Law & Justice in 2004 to 2009.

In 2008, Singh switched to the Indian National Congress due to conflicts with his BJP colleague Digamber Singh. His move to Congress marked his return to the party after two decades. As a member of Congress party, he contested the Rajasthan Legislative Assembly elections and has been elected as MLA for the Nadbai constituency from 1993 to 1998 and Deeg-Kumher constituency for two terms, 2013–2018 and 2018–2023.

Singh's ministerial roles in the Rajasthan government have been significant. He served as the Minister of Tourism and Devasthan from December 2018 to July 2020, under chief minister Ashok Gehlot and deputy chief minister Sachin Pilot. Later, he held the portfolio of Tourism and Civil Aviation from November 2021 to December 2023.

His political journey has been influenced by his royal heritage as the son of the last ruler of the princely state of Bharatpur, Maharaja Brijendra Singh. Despite the abolition of official symbols of princely India, including titles and privileges, in the 26th amendment to the Constitution of India in 1971, Singh’s royal background has provided him with a unique political leverage.

== Rajasthan Legislative Assembly ==
SI No.	Year	Legislative Assembly	Constituency	Margin	Party	Post
1.	1993	10th	Nadbai	33,378	Indian National Congress	MLA
2.	2013	14th	Deeg-Kumher	11,162	Indian National Congress	MLA
3.	2018	15th	Deeg-Kumher	8,218	Indian National Congress	MLA

== Lok Sabha ==
SI No.	Year	Lok Sabha	Constituency	Party	Committee
1.	1989	9th	Bharatpur	Janata Dal	-
2.	1999	13th	Bharatpur	Bhartiya Janta Party	Member of the Committee on Science & Technology and Forest & Environment.
3.	2004	14th	Bharatpur	Bhartiya Janta Party	Member of the Committee on Personal & Public Grievance and Law & Justice.
