= Natthi Singh =

Indian politician (born 1929)

Member of the Parliament, Rajya Sabha
- In office 3 April 1974 – 2 April 1980
- Constituency: Rajasthan

Cabinet Minister Government of Rajasthan
- In office 4 March 1990 – 15 November 1990

Member of the Rajasthan Legislative Assembly
- In office 1962 - 1972, 1985 – 1993

Personal details
- Born: 28 December 1929 (age 96) Usrani village, Bharatpur, Rajasthan

Natthi Singh Sinsinwar (born 28 December 1929) is an Indian politician and farmer leader from Bharatpur, Rajasthan. He briefly served as cabinet minister in Government of Rajasthan and held the portfolio of Revenue, Forest, Indira Gandhi Canal Project Department, Land Reforms, as a member of the Janata Dal, in the coalition government of BJP and Janata Dal in Rajasthan. He was a Member of Parliament in Rajya Sabha from April 1974 to April 1980 as a member of the Indian National Congress. He was elected to the Rajasthan Legislative Assembly for four terms, 1962 to 1972 from Bharatpur and from 1985 to 1993 from Deeg Kumher.

== Personal life ==
Singh was born in Usrani village, of Bharatpur district, in Rajasthan, in a Hindu Jat family, to Charan Singh and Janaki Devi. He earned an MA from Agra college, and an LLB. degree from Rajasthan University.

Singh married Vidhyawati Devi, and they had 5 sons and 5 daughters. Nathi Singh's son Subhash Singh retired from NAFED as an Executive Director, and is currently active in local politics in the Deeg Kumher Constituency, Bharatpur focusing on regional developmental issues.

== Law career ==
Singh enrolled with the Bar Council of India, as an Advocate in 1953, and was a prominent lawyer in the fields of criminal and revenue law and also for cooperatives. He practiced law in Bharatpur District court and Rajasthan High Court.

== Electoral record ==
=== Rajasthan Legislative Assembly ===
Year	Constituency	Vote Margin	Party
1962	Bharatpur	2330	Independent
1967	Bharatpur	13917	SSP
1985	Kumher	19242	LKD
1990	Kumher	11581	JD

=== Rajya Sabha ===
Term	State	Party
1974-1980	Rajasthan	INC

== See also ==
- Samyukta Socialist Party

== Sources ==
- "Rajasthan Assembly Election Results in 1962". elections.in.
- Gupta, Shekhar (31 December 1984). "Election campaign fails to generate enthusiasm in Rajasthan". India Today.
