= Joginder Singh Awana =

Indian politician

Member of the Rajasthan Legislative Assembly
- In office 2018–2023
- Preceded by: Krishnendra Kaur (Deepa)
- Succeeded by: Jagat Singh (politician)
- Constituency: Nadbai

Personal details
- Party: Rashtriya Lok Dal (2025–present)
- Other political affiliations: Bahujan Samaj Party (2014-2019) Indian National Congress (2019-2025)

Joginder Singh Awana is an Indian politician. He served as a Member of the Rajasthan Legislative Assembly representing Nadbai from 2018 to 2023.
