= Shailesh Singh =

Indian politician (born 1980)

Dr. Shailesh Singh
- डॉ . शैलेश सिंह
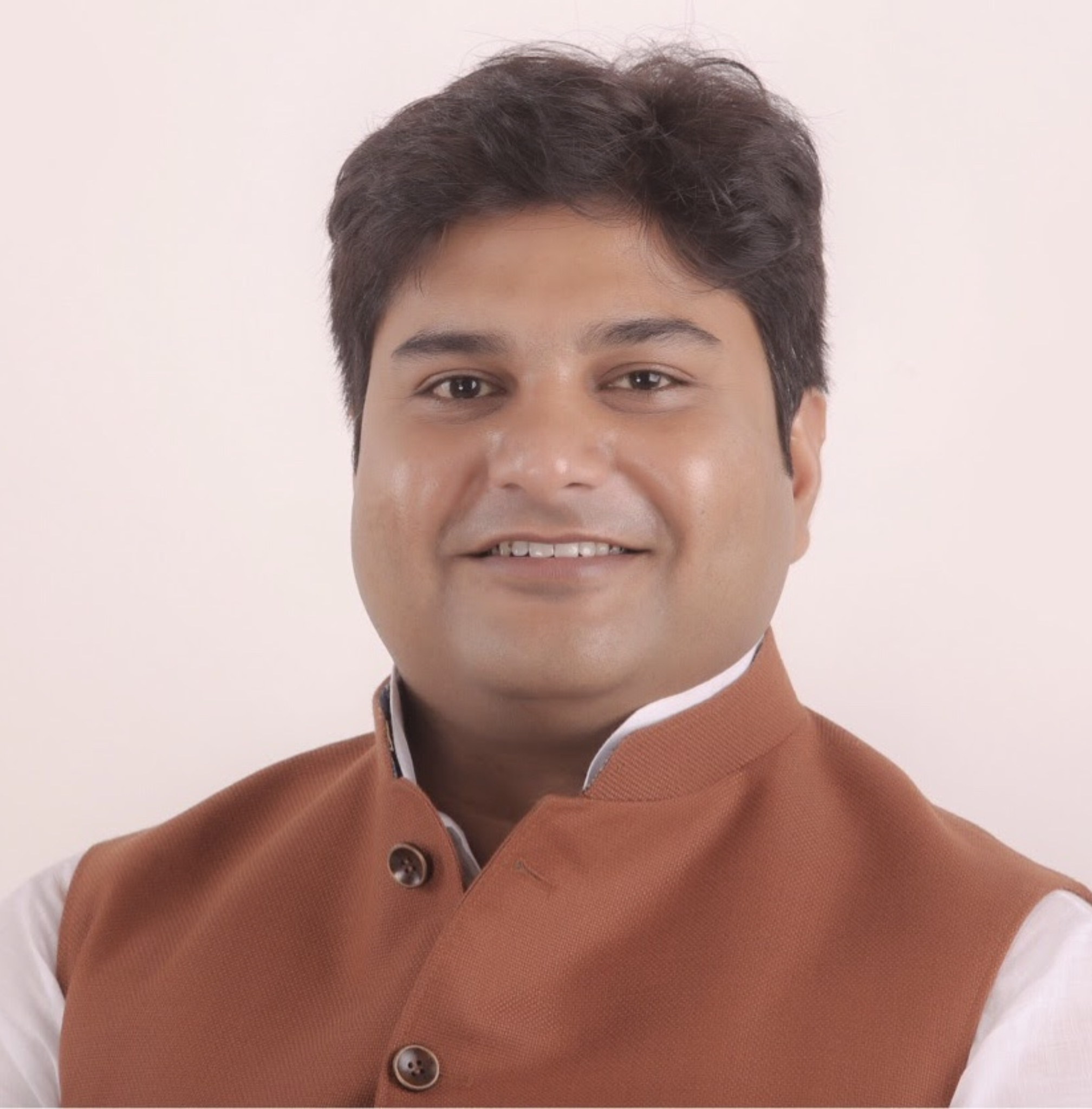
- Official portrait, 2017

Member of the 16th Rajasthan Assembly
- Incumbent
- Assumed office 3 December 2023
- Preceded by: Vishvendra Singh
- Constituency: Deeg-Kumher

President of Bharatiya Janata Party, Bharatpur
- In office 17 December 2019 – 17 January 2023
- Preceded by: Bhanupratap Singh
- Succeeded by: Rishi Bansal

Personal details
- Born: 20 July 1980 (age 46) Bharatpur, Rajasthan
- Party: Bhartiya Janta Party
- Spouse: Dr. Kirti Singh
- Parent(s): Dr. Digamber Singh & Asha Singh
- Occupation: Politician
- Profession: Doctor
- Website: https://www.shaileshdigamber.in

Shailesh Singh is an Indian politician currently serving as a member of the Rajasthan Legislative Assembly, representing the Deeg-Kumher constituency as a member of the Bhartiya Janta Party. He is the son of former Health & Industries Minister, Digamber Singh.

Following the 2023 Rajasthan Legislative Assembly election, he was elected as an MLA from the Deeg-Kumher Assembly constituency, defeating Vishvendra Singh, the candidate from the Indian National Congress (INC), with 89,063 votes.

== Early life ==
Dr. Shailesh Singh was born on 20 July 1980 in Bharatpur, Rajasthan. He is the second child and the only son of Dr. Digamber Singh and Asha Singh.

Shailesh completed his primary and secondary education in Bharatpur district. He later attended a boarding school in Mussoorie for two years. As an undergraduate student, Shailesh pursued medicine and completed his MBBS from MGM Institute of Health Sciences in 2006.

== Political career ==
=== Early Career (2008 - 2017) ===
After graduation, Shailesh actively engaged in family businesses and oversaw the management of his father's commercial affairs. In 2007, he was appointed the Director of the Shree Digamber Nursing College in Bharatpur and the Shree Digamber Engineering College in Dausa.

In the 2008 Rajasthan Legislative Assembly election, Shailesh successfully campaigned for his father in the Deeg-Kumher Assembly constituency. During the 2013 Rajasthan Legislative Assembly election, Shailesh was again actively engaged in his father's unsuccessful campaign. These engagements introduced him to public and political life.

=== Active Politics (2017 - Present) ===
==== After the death of Dr. Digamber Singh ====
On 27 October 2017, after the death of his father, Shailesh stepped into active politics at the age of 37. He unsuccessfully contested the 2018 Rajasthan Legislative Assembly election from the Deeg-Kumher Assembly constituency, marking the family's second consecutive defeat from the constituency.

==== President of Bharatiya Janata Party, Bharatpur (2019 - 2023) ====
On 17 December 2019, Shailesh was appointed the President of Bharatiya Janata Party, Bharatpur district. His tenure was critical of the state government's actions pertinent to social welfare, protection of religious places and spiritual individuals and students’ rights. He is credited with the Bharatiya Janata Party's sweeping five of the seven assembly seats in Bharatpur district. In view of the upcoming 2023 elections, Shailesh resigned from the post of party district President on 17 January 2023.

==== Member of Legislative Assembly Deeg-Kumher (2023 - Present) ====
On 3 December 2023, Shailesh was declared winner from the Deeg-Kumher Assembly constituency, defeating Indian National Congress's Vishvendra Singh by a margin of 7895 votes. This was the second defeat of the erstwhile Royal family of Bharatpur State since independence, the first being in 2008, when Shailesh's father had defeated Vishvendra.

Shailesh's win against Vishvendra, the only second time since independence that the royal house of Bharatpur faced defeat, the first being by his father, pitted him as a strong contender for a ministry in the cabinet. After Bhajan Lal Sharma, a former aide of Shailesh's father, Dr. Digamber Singh, was chosen by the BJP leadership to be Chief Minister of Rajasthan in a surprise move, Shailesh was almost certain to get a cabinet berth. However, this did not happen. And for the first time no Jat leader was included in the cabinet from eastern Rajasthan. This reflected poorly on the BJP, and the party lost the Bharatpur Lok Sabha Constituency in 2024. The party lost by a margin of 2400 votes from Shailesh's constituency, Deeg-Kumher.

In February 2024, Shailesh was appointed convenor of the government committee to review the demand for reservation by the Jat community, in the aftermath of the Jat agitation in January 2024. The committee referred the matter to the central commission in New Delhi.

In July 2024, Singh was successful in procuring budget sanctions worth 100 crore rupees ($11.9 million) for the 16 km long Deeg bypass project. In the Assembly, Shailesh had suggested a water lift program from the Sawai Khera depression to the Govardhan drain. The project with an estimated cost of 6.25 crores ($746,549) was approved in July 2024. Shailesh had also submitted a formal request for the upgradation of the Kumher community health centre (CHC) to the status of a hospital, which was accepted and approved by the Health Ministry and provisions made in the budget 2024. Another long due project of inaugurating a Veterinary Hospital in Kumher was approved after Shailesh's meeting with the Dairy & Animal Husbandry Minister in the same budget. Major projects in the development of the ‘Brij 84 Circumambulation’ arrangement were mandated by Shailesh in the budget 2024. In August 2024, Shailesh declared the government's approval for the establishment of an agriculture university in Kumher.

Shailesh has been a vocal critic of the preceding Ashok Gehlot government's decision in their final year to create 19 new districts in Rajasthan. Calling it a blatant attempt at gerrymandering and political appeasing, Shailesh alleged in the Assembly that the previous government had completely neglected administrative feasibility and had ensued chaos by haphazardly drawing up boundaries of the new districts. In August 2024, Shailesh officially called in the assembly for the re-merger of the Rarah and close by tehsils into Bharatpur from Deeg. In popular opinion, it was the disgruntlement around the creation of the Deeg district that amped up public support for Shailesh in the run-up to the 2023 elections. The dissolution of districts is a highly convoluted process and Shailesh has said that he will attempt to reign in the “unmitigated disaster” by the previous administration through the intended delimitation and review in 2027.

On 26 January 2025, India's 75th Republic Day, a controversy erupted after Shailesh took to media that he had received no invitation to attend the official ceremony in Bharatpur. He later requested Chief Minister Bhajan Lal Sharma to initiate an investigation against the Additional District Magistrate (ADM) in the matter. On 1 February 2025, Deeg ADM was notified that he awaits a new posting order.

== Electoral career ==
Election	Constituency	Party	Result	Opponent	Votes gained	Margin	Vote Share%
2018 Rajasthan Legislative Assembly Election	Deeg-Kumher	Bharatiya Janata Party	Lost	Vishvendra Singh, Indian National Congress	65,512	8,218 votes	40.35%
2023 Rajasthan Legislative Assembly Election	Deeg-Kumher	Bharatiya Janata Party	Won	Vishvendra Singh, Indian National Congress	89,063	7,895 votes	48.54%
