= Maharani Divya Singh =

Indian politician (born 1963)

Member of Parliament Lok Sabha
- In office 1996–1998
- Preceded by: Krishnendra Kaur (Deepa)
- Succeeded by: K. Natwar Singh
- Constituency: Bharatpur

Personal details
- Born: 6 November 1963
- Party: Bharatiya Janta Party
- Spouse: Maharaj Vishvendra Singh
- Profession: Politician

Maharani Divya Singh (born 6 November 1963) is an Indian politician and a former member of the Lok Sabha, the lower house of the Indian parliament. She was elected from the Bharatpur constituency in Rajasthan as a candidate from the Bhartiya Janta Party.

== Early life ==
Singh was born on 6 November 1963, in Lucknow, Uttar Pradesh. On 15 February 1989, she married Maharaj Vishvendra Singh.

== Education & Career ==
Singh received a Bachelor of Arts from the Isabella Thoburn College. Singh became a member of the Bharatpur district council in 1996. Later, she was elected to the 11th Lok Sabha. In 2012, Singh resigned as member of the Rajasthan Public Service Commission to which she had been appointed in 2011, citing personal reasons.
