= Ramesh Chandra (academic) =

Indian biomedical researcher

Ramesh Chandra FAMS, FRSC (London)
- Born: 1 July 1957 (age 69); Bijwara, Meerut, Uttar Pradesh, India
- Education: University of Delhi
- Scientific career
- Fields: Biomedical Sciences
- Workplaces: University of Delhi, New York Hospital -Cornell University Medical College, New York jointly Rockefeller University, New York, State University of New York (SUNY), Stony Brook Massachusetts General Hospital, Harvard Medical School , Massachusetts Institute of Technology (MIT), Cambridge, USA

Professor Ramesh Chandra (born 1 July 1957) is a biomedical scientist, educationist, administrator and institution builder who has worked mainly to address the need to provide chemotherapeutic approaches and “kinder and gentler” chemotherapy modalities. He has authored more than 400 research publications and edited dozens of books. Moreover, he has mentored more than 100 Ph.D. students and a large number of M.Phil., M.Sc., M.Tech., and M.D. students, who are occupying high positions globally.

Chandra is currently the Vice Chancellor of Maharaja Surajmal Brij University, Bharatpur, Rajasthan since March 2023 and the Founder Director of Institute of Nano Medical Sciences (INMS) at University of Delhi, Delhi, India.

== Education ==
In 1974, Chandra completed his Bachelor of Science (B.Sc.) from Janta Vedic College, Baraut, Uttar Pradesh at the age of 17 years and subsequently Masters of Science (M.Sc.) from Digambar Jain College, Baraut, Uttar Pradesh at 20 years. In 1978, he earned a diploma in Forensic Science and M.Phil. in Chemistry from University of Delhi. Later, in September 1981, he completed his Ph.D. in Chemistry and Masters in Medical Biochemistry from University of Delhi at 24 years.

== Career ==
In 1982, Chandra started his career as Research Associate at the Vallabhbhai Patel Chest Institute, University of Delhi and subsequently, for a brief period, he joined as Scientist ‘B’ in the then Council of Scientific Research (CSIR) – Publication & Information Directorate (PIO), which is now CSIR - National Institute Of Science Communication and Policy Research (CSIR–NIScPR). Thereafter, he left for the United States to pursue his research at the New York Hospital – Cornell University Medical College, New York jointly at the Rockefeller University, New York and worked there as a research associate until February 1985. He then joined as a lecturer in the Department of Chemistry, University of Delhi in February 1985. In 1986, Chandra went to join as an assistant research professor in the School of Medicine at the State University of New York (SUNY), Stony Brook and later moved to Massachusetts General Hospital, Harvard Medical School jointly at the Department of Chemical Engineering at Massachusetts Institute of Technology (MIT), Cambridge, USA.

During his stay at the Rockefeller University, he dreamt of establishing an institute for biomedical research in India which he translated by founding Dr. B. R. Ambedkar Center for Biomedical Research (ACBR) at University of Delhi upon his return to India, in 1990. He established ACBR as a university-maintained institute under Ordinance XX of the University of Delhi. The foundation stone of ACBR was laid by the then Prime Minister of India on 31 March 1991. During this period, Dr. Chandra was also the scientific advisor/consultant to Polaroid Corporation, USA and established Polaroid India in Gurgaon to develop in-house software for the company. Chandra's programs are never constrained by resource crunch He firmly believes in the Public-Private Partnership and trusts that necessary funds can always be procured from business, industry, and the public, provided the educational and research programs can meet the development requirements of the country in new and emerging areas of knowledge and professions, such as physical, mathematical, and biotechnological sciences, social sciences, business, and management. He spent a sum of over $8,00,000 that he received from Polaroid corporation, USA for the establishment of ACBR at University of Delhi. From 1991 to 2005, he was the Director of Dr. B. R. Ambedkar Center for Biomedical Research (ACBR) at University of Delhi. He served as a professor of chemistry at University of Delhi from February 1985 to June 2022 and was the Head of Department of Chemistry from August 2017 to July 2020

Chandra was the Vice Chancellor of Bundelkhand University, Jhansi (which is now accredited A++ by NAAC) from July 1999 to July 2005. During his tenure, he transformed the “degree shop” to a centre of excellence. Since 1999, when Chandra took charge as Vice Chancellor, he established 36 institutes of higher learning and research offering over 207 study programmes in disciplines as diverse as business management, food technology and applied sciences. Furthermore, he increased the faculty strength from just 7 to about 800 well qualified teaching personnel. Also, the student numbers swelled from a meagre 126 to about 15000 on campus enrolments, with him at the helm of affairs

At a very young age, Prof. Chandra contributed for the academic development of Guru Nanak Dev University, Amritsar – as an Institute of Applied Science & Technology including Centre for Genetic Disorders (1988 - 1996). As an advisor, he has been instrumental in various academic developments of Indian Institute of Information Technology (IIIT - Allahabad).

In addition to this, he has been the President of the Indian Chemical Society during 2004 to 2006; Member of the Planning Commission, Government of U.P., India; Secretary of the Zaheer Science Foundation, New Delhi; Non-Official Director, Rashtriya Ispat Nigam Ltd (RINL), Government of India; and Official resource person to the Minister and Department of Science and Technology in the kingdom of Lesotho, South Africa, etc.

Chandra is the recipient of several professional national and international recognitions, such as

- The J. William Fulbright Scholarship (1993)
- The Rockefeller Foundation USA-Biotechnology Career Award (1993)
- Award of the Highest Honor of Soka University, Tokyo, Japan (2000)
- Millennium Plaques of Honor (Life Time Achievement Award for contribution in Science & Technology) by the Indian Science Congress Association (ISCA) (2017–2018)
- Lifetime Achievement Award of Indian Academy of Biomedical Sciences (2022)
- Lifetime Achievement Award of the Indian Chemical Society (ICS) (2003)
- UGC Research Scientist Award (1988); UGC Career Award (1993)
- Rajib Goyal Award for Young Scientists (2002)
- Fellowship of: Indian Academy of Biomedical Sciences (IABS); International Academy of Physical Sciences; Institution of Chemists, India; Indian Chemical Society; National Academy of Medical Sciences (FAMS), Royal Society of Chemistry, London and others

== Scientific Contributions ==
Chandra has made outstanding contributions to the invention, discovery and development of Noscapinoids, which was a transformational event in the treatment of drug resistant cancers. During the past more than two decades, Chandra has been engaged with anticancer drug discovery focused on tubulin binding cytotoxic agents and new therapeutic combinations to treat cancer more effectively. He has also contributed towards the design and development of new drugs for management of human cancer based on HDAC inhibitors. He has demonstrated that Noscapine and its derivatives (Br-Nos, Rd Br-Nos) are effective in texane resistant cancer, and do not show sign of neurotoxicity or immunosuppression. He has also integrated in-silico analysis, in-vitro and in-vivo studies, to identify and validate novel therapeutics. He has led the team which brought this revolutionary drug to clinical trials but also has continued to work in the development of Noscapinoids as new cancer drugs. (Nat Sci Rep, 2018; Artificial Cells Nanomed and Biotechnol, 2018, 46(6), 1288–12199).

For SAR study, he has synthesized a library of derivatives of noscapine (Noscapinoids), a known antitussive chemotherapeutic agent having low toxicity in humans, and have shown that they promote assembly of tubulin subunits, a characteristic suitable for the treatment of tumors and various neoplastic diseases. His group has demonstrated that derivatives of the natural opioid, Noscapine (such as halogeno-, nitro- and partially reduced Noscapine) have interesting anti-microtubular properties that differ from other two principal classes of anticancer drugs that target microtubules i.e. Vinca alkaloids and taxanes widely used in chemotherapy (albeit, both are toxic at effective doses). In particular, they have reported on the high promise shown by brominated derivatives of noscapine (EMO11 & EMO12) as anticancer chemotherapy agents while improving on some of the limitations of the other anti-microtubule acting drugs. Treatment with one or more of these compounds selectively halts cell cycle progression at theG2/M phase in cancer cells without affecting the cell cycle of normal human fibroblast cells. This mitotic catastrophe in cancer cells is then followed by induction of apoptosis. The apoptotic mechanism is associated with activation of the key executioner cysteine protease,caspase-3. Most importantly, these compounds are more potent against cancer cells that have become resistant to currently used drugs, like vinblastine, teniposide and paclitaxel, as compared to their respective sensitive-parent lines. Additionally, he has contributed to regulate the Noscapine-based nanoparticle drug delivery in glioblastoma and skin cancer cells. (US Patent WO 2008/109614 A1; Nanomedicine, 2013, 9, 492–503; Biomed. Pharmacol., 2017, 90, 906–913) .

Again, extensive histopathological investigations in his laboratory, involving 1-oxo-5α,6β- epoxy-witha-2-enolide, isolable from the roots of with aniasomnifera, have revealed its high efficacy in treatment of skin carcinoma induced by UV B radiation.

He has carried out extensive in-depth studies on binding affinity of Heme Oxygenase Inhibitor, Sn protoporphyrin, with proteins, apomyoglobin and serum albumin. The researchers have led to a description of a mechanism by which the rate-limiting enzyme, Heme Oxygenase, in the degradation of heme to bilirubin, is inhibited by SnPP and SnMP, which finally controls physiological jaundice. He has also studied the detailed mechanism of interaction of retinoic acid, singly as well as in conjunction with Sn-protoporphyrin, with Heme Oxygenase, and the antagonistic effect of ZnPP on gossypol-mediated induction of hepatic and renal Heme Oxygenase. These studies have permitted simple exploration of the kinetic mechanism of porphyrins binding by apomyoglobin and serum albumin. Based on these fundamental studies, a therapy for neonatal jaundice has been discovered. A compendious account of his notable contributions in this area has appeared in Drug Metabolism Reviews (1993).

Chandra has carried out intensive studies of binding characteristics of several poly- heterocyclic compounds with DNA. The specific binding of ligands such as 5-(4-methyl- piperazin-1-yl)–2-[‘2-(3,4-dimethoxyphenyl)-5’-benzimidazolyl]-benzimidazole (DMA) and 5- (4-methyl-piperazin-1-yl)-2-[2’-{“2-(4-hydroxy-3-methoxyphenyl)-“5-benz-imidazolyl}-‘5- benzimidazolyl}-benz-imidazole (TBZ) with the minor groove of DNA has been shown to display increased sequence and structure selective recognition and enhanced fluorescence, a result of considerable potential significance in medicine.

In his research on activation of gene transcription, he has demonstrated the successful employment (in vivo) of hairpin triplex forming oligonucleotides for targeted activation of gene expression of two genes mapping on chromosomes of saccharomyces cerevisiae. His other noteworthy contributions relate to free-radical-mediated oxidative DNA cleavage, and significant modifications of structure and evaluation of active principles of ayurvedic plants such as Asparagus Racemosus, Acacia Catechu, Ocimum Sanctum, Annona Squamosa and Papaver Somniferous, which display high potential for medical applications. His recent contribution relates to development of several polymer based non-viral vectors, wherein he has successfully demonstrated their efficacy to deliver genes and siRNA to mammalian cells. He explored two different polymers i.e. chitosan and PEI and modulated them to fabricate nanoparticles for delivery of genes and siRNA.

== Personal life ==
Chandra is married to Dr. Sujata K Dass in 1988. They have two children, Ankush and Avishi. Dr. Sujata is currently the Medical Superintendent at NKS Super Speciality Hospital, New Delhi, India. Ankush works as a neurosurgeon at Department of Neurosurgery, University of Texas Health Sciences Centre in Houston, USA and Avishi is a specialist in US Privacy Law and is working in Comcast, Philadelphia, USA.
