= Sanjana Jatav =

Indian politician (born 1998)

- संजना जाटव
- Official portrait

Secretary, All India Congress Committee
- Incumbent
- Assumed office 11 November 2025
- Constituency: Madhya Pradesh (In-charge)

Member of Parliament, Lok Sabha
- Incumbent
- Assumed office 4 June 2024
- Preceded by: Ranjeeta Koli
- Constituency: Bharatpur
- Majority: 52,983 (51%)

Member Zila Parishad, Alwar
- In office 17 November 2021 – 15 June 2024

Personal details
- Born: 1 May 1998 (age 28) Bhusawar, Bharatpur, Rajasthan, India
- Party: Indian National Congress
- Spouse: Kaptan Singh Jatav (m. 2016)
- Children: 2
- Education: B.A. & L.L.B
- Alma mater: Maharaja Surajmal Brij University & Lords University
- Profession: Advocate & Politician

Sanjana Jatav (born 1 May 1998; Hindi pronunciation: [sə̃d͡ʒən̪aː d͡ʒaːʈəʋ]) is an Indian politician from Bharatpur, Rajasthan. She is a member of the Indian National Congress. She was elected to the 18th Lok Sabha, the lower house of the parliament in 2024 from the Bharatpur. She is among the youngest MPs from Rajasthan.

== Early life and education ==
Sanjana was born on 1 May 1998 to Harbhajan and Ramvati Devi. Her father is a thekedar (contractor) and has been an up-sarpanch. Her maiden home is in Bhusawar, Bharatpur district. She completed her BA from Gandhi Jyoti College of Maharaja Surajmal Brij University and her LLB from Lords University, Alwar. She is a resident of Samunchi village in Kathumar tehsil, Alwar district and is married to Kaptan Singh, who is a constable with the Rajasthan Police. They have two children.

== Political career ==
Sanjana's first electoral contest was in the Alwar Zila Parishad where she won from ward 29 by 4,991 votes. In the 2023 Rajasthan election, she was placed as the Congress candidate from Kathumar (SC) and lost by a slim margin of 409 votes. The candidacy had marked a change in tactics of the Congress party where they had pushed for a young female leader instead of relying on the traditional veteran former MLA of the constituency. She has the backing of senior Congress leaders Bhanwar Jitendra Singh and Vishvendra Singh and is also associated with Priyanka Gandhi, leading the Congress's "Ladki Hoon Lad Sakti Hoon" campaign in eastern Rajasthan, to amplify messages of women's empowerment and gender equality among rural women.

She is seen as a young rising star in the Congress party who has been campaigning to tackle issues of rampant crime in Mewat, inflation, unemployment, shortage of water, electricity, roads and farmers getting fair prices, fertilisers and seeds. Her candidature has gotten the backing of veteran leaders like Bhanwar Jitendra Singh and Vishvendra Singh. Rajasthan Congress president Govind Singh Dotasra has also campaigned in her support in the constituency. She is also leading Congress's "Ladki Hoon Lad Sakti Hoon" in eastern Rajasthan with the aim of spreading the message of the importance of women's empowerment in the region. Sanjana had previously contested as the Congress candidate from Kathumar (SC) in 2023 Rajasthan election, losing by a razor thin margin of 409 votes.

Jatav was among the members who participated in protests in the Lok Sabha during the 2026 Budget Session, during which members entered the vale and displayed placards, surrounding the front benches, including the area of the Prime Minister’s seat, contributing to disruptions that led to adjournment of the House.

== Posts held ==
#	From	To	Position	Constituency
1	17 November 2021	15 June 2024	Member Zila Parishad, Alwar	Alwar
2	4 June 2024	Incumbent	Member of Parliament, 18th Lok Sabha	Bharatpur, Rajasthan
3	26 September 2024	Incumbent	Member, Committee on Water Resources	
4	11 November 2025	Incumbent	Secretary, All India Congress Committee	Madhya Pradesh (In-charge)
