= Kathumar Assembly constituency =

Legislative Assembly constituency in Rajasthan State, India

Coordinates: 27.32°N 77.08°E

Kathumar
- Constituency No. 69 for the Rajasthan Legislative Assembly

Constituency details
- Country: India
- Region: North India
- State: Rajasthan
- District: Alwar
- Lok Sabha constituency: Bharatpur
- Established: 1972
- Total electors: 229,399
- Reservation: SC

Member of Legislative Assembly
- 16th Rajasthan Legislative Assembly
- Incumbent Ramesh Khinchi
- Party: Bharatiya Janata Party
- Elected year: 2023

Kathumar Assembly constituency is one of the 200 Legislative Assembly constituencies of Rajasthan state in India.

It is part of Alwar district and is reserved for candidates belonging to the Scheduled Castes. It consists of Kathumar tehsil and parts of Laxmangarh tehsil, both in Alwar district.

== Members of the Legislative Assembly ==
Year	Member	Party
1972	Gokul Chand	Indian National Congress
1977	Ganga Sahai	Janata Party
1980	Babulal Bairwa	Independent
1985	Babulal Bairwa	Indian National Congress
1990	Jagannath Pahadia	Indian National Congress
1993	Mangal Ram Koli	Independent
1998	Ramesh Chand Khinchi	Indian National Congress
2003	Ramesh Chand Khinchi	Indian National Congress
2008	Babulal Bairwa	Bharatiya Janata Party
2013	Mangal Ram Koli	Bharatiya Janata Party
2018	Babulal Bairwa	Indian National Congress
2023	Ramesh Khinchi	Bharatiya Janata Party

== Election results ==
=== 2023 ===
2023 Rajasthan Legislative Assembly election: Kathumar
Party	Candidate	Votes	%	±%
BJP	Ramesh Khinchi	79,756	48.52	+21.09
INC	Sanjana Jatav	79,347	48.27	+11.11
NOTA	None of the above	738	0.45	−0.29
Majority		409	0.25	−9.48
Turnout		164,389	71.66	+0.92
BJP gain from INC		Swing		

=== 2018 ===
2018 Rajasthan Legislative Assembly election: Kathumar
Party	Candidate	Votes	%	±%
INC	Babulal Bairwa	54,110	37.16	
BJP	Babulal Manager	39,942	27.43	
Independent	Ramesh Chand Khinchi	32,916	22.6	
RLP	Narsee Kumar Kirid	10,846	7.45	
BSP	Iswar Singh	2,332	1.6	
Independent	Roop Narain Singh	1,626	1.12	
Independent	Babulal	1,304	0.9	
NOTA	None of the above	1,071	0.74	
Majority		14,168	9.73	
Turnout		145,622	70.74	
INC gain from BJP		Swing		

=== 2013 ===
2013 Rajasthan Legislative Assembly election: Kathumar
Party	Candidate	Votes	%	±%
BJP	Mangal Ram Koli	53,483	39.93	
INC	Ramesh Chand Khinchi	37,753	28.18	
NPP	Babulal Bairwa	31,318	23.38	
Majority		15,730		
Turnout		1,33,958	75.16%	
BJP hold		Swing		

=== 2008 ===
2013 Rajasthan Legislative Assembly election: Kathumar
Party	Candidate	Votes	%	±%
BJP	Babulal Bairwa	49,572	45.98	
INC	Ramesh Chand Khinchi	47,879	44.41	
BSP	Banni Ram	4622	4.29	
Majority		1693		
Turnout		1,07,817	69.56%	
BJP gain from INC		Swing		

== See also ==
- List of constituencies of the Rajasthan Legislative Assembly
- Alwar district
