= Natwar Singh =

Indian politician (1931–2024)

Kunwar Natwar Singh
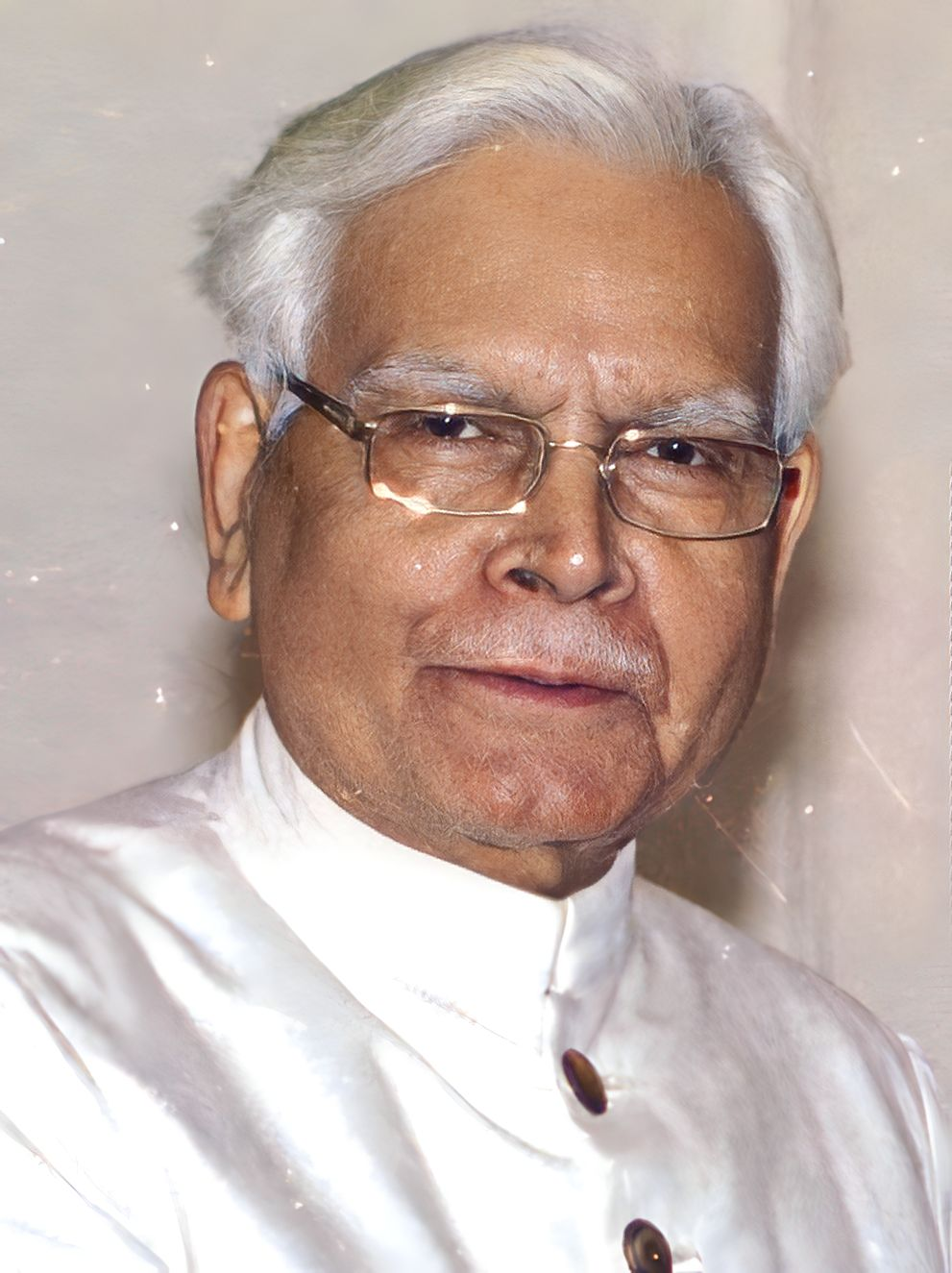
- Singh in 2005

Minister of External Affairs
- In office 22 May 2004 – 6 November 2005
- Prime Minister: Manmohan Singh
- Preceded by: Yashwant Sinha
- Succeeded by: Manmohan Singh

Minister without portfolio
- In office 6 November 2005 – 8 December 2005
- Prime Minister: Manmohan Singh
- Preceded by: K. Chandrasekhar Rao
- Succeeded by: Vilasrao Deshmukh

Personal details
- Born: 16 May 1931 Jaghina, Bharatpur State, British India (present-day Rajasthan, India)
- Died: 10 August 2024 (aged 93) Gurugram, Haryana, India
- Party: Indian National Congress (1984–2006); Bahujan Samaj Party (2008)
- Spouse: Heminder Kaur
- Children: 2, including Jagat Singh
- Education: Mayo College
- Alma mater: St. Stephen's College, Delhi. Corpus Christi College, Cambridge
- Occupation: Politician
- Awards: Padma Bhushan

Kunwar Natwar Singh (16 May 1931 – 10 August 2024) was an Indian politician and diplomat of the Indian Foreign Service who later served as India's Minister of External Affairs from May 2004 to December 2005. Having been suspended by the Indian National Congress (INC) in 2006, he joined the Bahujan Samaj Party (BSP) in 2008 but was removed from the party within four months.

Singh was selected into the Indian Foreign Service in 1953. In 1984, he resigned from the service to contest elections as a member of the INC. He won the election and served as a union minister of state until 1989. Thereafter, he had a patchy political career until being made India's foreign minister in 2004. However, 18 months later, he had to resign after the United Nations' (UN) Volcker committee named both he and the INC to which he belonged as beneficiaries of illegal pay-offs in the scandal related to the UN's Oil-for-Food Programme.

In 2014, he wrote his autobiography One Life is Not Enough. This book was criticised for its attempt to create sensation, while the Congress criticised Natwar Singh for distortion of facts due to his removal from the political position.

== Early life and education ==
The fourth son of Govind Singh and his wife Prayag Kaur of village 'Jagheena', Singh was born in the princely state of Bharatpur in an aristocrat Jat Hindu family related to the ruling dynasty of Bharatpur. He attended Mayo College, Ajmer, a traditional educational institutions for Indian princely clans and nobles. Thereafter he took an undergraduate degree at the prestigious St. Stephen's College, Delhi. He subsequently studied at Corpus Christi College, Cambridge and was a visiting scholar for a period at Peking University in China.

== Diplomatic career ==
Singh joined the Indian Foreign Service in 1953 and served for 31 years. One of his earliest assignments was in Beijing, China (1956–58). He was then posted to New York City at the Permanent Mission of India (1961–66) and as India's representative to executive board of UNICEF (1962–66). He served on several UN committees between 1963 and 1966. In 1966, he was posted to the Prime Minister's Secretariat under Indira Gandhi. He served as India's Ambassador to Poland from 1971 to 1973, India's Deputy High Commissioner to the United Kingdom from 1973 to 1977 and India's Ambassador to Pakistan from 1980 to 1982. He was part of the Indian delegation to the Heads of Commonwealth Meeting in Kingston, Jamaica in 1975. He was an Indian Delegate to the 30th Session of the United Nations General Assembly, New York, Heads of Commonwealth Meeting, Lusaka, Zambia in 1979 and the 35th Session of the United Nations General Assembly, New York. He also accompanied Indira Gandhi on her State visit to the US in 1982. He served as an Executive Trustee, United Nations Institute for Training and Research (UNITAR) appointed by the Secretary-General, United Nations for six years (1981–86). He also served on the Expert Group appointed by the Secretary General of the Commonwealth, London in 1982. He was appointed Secretary-General of the Seventh Non-aligned Summit in New Delhi held in 1983 and Chief Coordinator of the Commonwealth Heads of Government Meeting (CHOGM) in New Delhi in the same year. He served as Secretary in the Ministry of External Affairs from March 1982 to November 1984. He received the Padma Bhushan, the third highest civilian award in India from the Government of India, in 1984.

== Political career ==
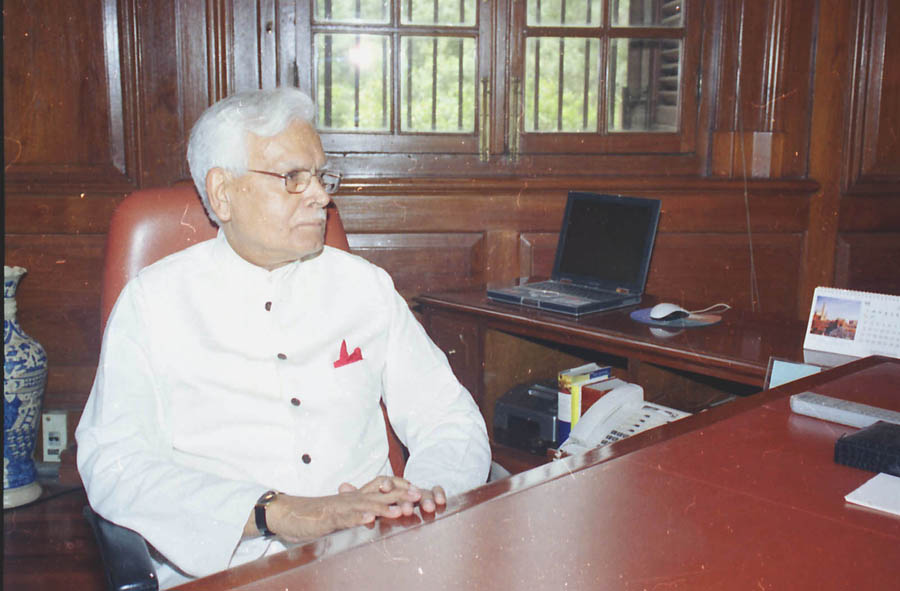
Natwar Singh assumes the charge of Union Minister for External Affairs in New Delhi on 24 May 2004

In 1984, after resigning from the Indian Foreign Service, Singh joined the Indian National Congress (INC) party and was elected to the 8th Lok Sabha from Bharatpur constituency in Rajasthan. In 1985, he was sworn in as a minister of state (who is a minister, but one level below a cabinet minister) and allotted the portfolios of steel, coal and mines, and agriculture. In 1986, he became minister of state for external affairs. In that capacity, he was elected President of the United Nations (UN) Conference on Disarmament and Development held in New York in 1987, and also led the Indian delegation to the 42nd Session of the UN General Assembly.

Singh remained a minister of state for external affairs until the Congress party lost power after being defeated in the general elections of 1989. In those elections, he contested and lost the Mathura seat in Uttar Pradesh. The Congress party returned to power after the elections of 1991, with P.V. Narasimha Rao as Prime Minister since Rajiv Gandhi had been assassinated. At this time, Singh was not an MP and could not be a minister. He developed differences with the Prime Minister and left the party along with N.D. Tiwari and Arjun Singh, to form a new political party, All India Indira Congress.

In 1998, after Sonia Gandhi had regained complete control of the party, the three family loyalists merged their new party into the Congress party and returned into the service of the Gandhis. Singh was rewarded with a ticket to contest the general elections of 1998, and returned to parliament after a gap of nine years, when he was elected to the 12th Lok Sabha (1998–99) from Bharatpur. Singh had defeated the Bharatiya Janata Party’s (BJP) Dr. Digamber Singh, who would go on to become Rajasthan’s Minister of Health, Family Welfare, and later Industries, and emerge as the tallest leader in eastern Rajasthan in the early 2000s, virtually upending Singh’s hold in the region. He had to sit in the opposition benches, however, and then he lost the elections of 1999. After a further hiatus of three years, he was elected (indirectly) to the Rajya Sabha from Rajasthan in 2002. The Congress party came back to power in 2004, and Prime Minister Manmohan Singh appointed Natwar Singh as the Minister of External affairs.

=== Oil-for-Food scandal ===
Singh assumed office on 23 May 2004 as India's minister of external affairs. On 27 October 2005, while Singh was abroad on an official visit, the Independent Inquiry Committee headed by Paul Volcker released the report on its investigation of corruption in the Oil-for-Food Programme. It included statements that India's Congress Party and Singh's family were non-contractual and corrupt beneficiaries of the Oil-for-Food Programme. Anil Mathrani, then Indian Ambassador to Croatia and formerly a close aide to Singh, alleged that Singh had used an official visit to Iraq to procure oil coupons for his son, Jagat Singh, from Saddam's regime.

On 26 March 2006, the Enforcement Directorate (ED) announced that it had traced a sum of eighty million rupees that had been transferred from the bank account of London-based Non-Resident Indian (NRI) businessman and family relative of Singh, Aditya Khanna, the son of businessman Vipin Khanna, to his own NRI account in a Delhi bank. The amount was later withdrawn and allegedly distributed among Indian beneficiaries of the reported scam.

Singh was suspended by the Congress in 2006.

=== Later career ===
In February 2008, Singh announced that he had quit the Congress at a BJP-sponsored rally of the Jat community held at Jaipur in the presence of Vasundhara Raje, then Chief Minister of Rajasthan. On this occasion, Singh not only asserted his innocence but also launched an attack on Sonia Gandhi for having failed to defend or support him.

In mid-2008, both Singh and his son Jagat joined Mayawati's Bahujan Samaj Party, only to be expelled by that party within four months (in November 2008) for alleged indiscipline, anti-party activities and "lack of faith" in the ideology of the Bahujan Samaj Movement. In fact, Singh had been demanding a Rajya Sabha seat (which had apparently been promised before he joined the party) and Mayawati had changed her mind on that matter. Jagat Singh later joined the BJP.

== Personal life and death ==
In August 1967, Singh married Heminder Kaur (born June 1939), the eldest daughter of the last Maharaja of Patiala State, Yadavindra Singh, and the sister of Amarinder Singh, who had served as the Chief Minister of Punjab. Heminder's mother Mohinder Kaur was also a politician. Singh’s son, Jagat Singh, is also a politician.

Natwar Singh died in Gurugram on 10 August 2024, at the age of 95.

== Autobiography ==
In August 2014, Singh's autobiography, One Life is Not Enough, was released. The book claims to reveal developments during Indira Gandhi's, Rajiv Gandhi's, Narasimha Rao's and Manmohan Singh's regimes. It also describes the changing contours of Singh's close but complex political relationship with Indian National Congress president Sonia Gandhi over the years. The book presents Singh's account of the Volcker report and the various political motions that took place in the background leading up to his resignation.

Congress rejected the allegations made by Singh and targeted him to have distorted facts "after being removed and publishes baseless things". They added that "spreading such sensationalism for shoring up the sale of a book" won't be accepted.

Sonia Gandhi also responded to the book and rejected its contents. She even expressed the intention to write her own autobiography to reveal the truth. Kallol Chakraborty writing for the Amar Ujala noted that the book fraught with the one-sided narrative may create sensation for sometime but it cannot achieve heights in the long run.

== Books published ==
1. E.M.Forster : A Tribute (on Forster's Eighty Fifth Birthday), editor, with Contributions by Ahmed Ali, Narayana Menon, Raja Rao & Santha Rama Rau, New York, 1964
2. The Legacy of Nehru: A Memorial Tribute, New York, 1965
3. Tales from Modern India, New York, 1966
4. Stories from India, London, 1971
5. Maharaja Suraj Mal, 1707-63: His Life and Times, London, 1981
6. Curtain Raisers, Delhi, 1984
7. Profiles & Letters, Delhi, 1997
8. The Magnificent Maharaja Bhupinder Singh of Patiala (1891–1938), Delhi, 1997
9. Heart to Heart, Delhi, 2003.
10. Yours Sincerely, December 2009.
11. Walking with Lions: Tales from a Diplomatic Past, Released by Hamid Ansari, March 2013.
12. One Life is Not Enough: An Autobiography, August 2014.
13. Treasured Epistles, August 2018.

Lok Sabha
Preceded by Rajesh Pilot	Member of Parliament for Bharatpur; 1984 – 1989	Succeeded by Vishvendra Singh
Preceded by Maharani Divya Singh	Member of Parliament for Bharatpur; 1998 – 1999	Succeeded by Vishvendra Singh
Political offices
Preceded by Yashwant Sinha	Minister for External Affairs of India; 23 May 2004 – 7 November 2005	Succeeded by Manmohan Singh
