= Babulal Bairwa =

Indian politician (1953–2026)

Member of the Rajasthan Legislative Assembly
- In office 2018–2023
- Preceded by: Mangal Ram Koli
- Succeeded by: Ramesh Chand Khinchi
- Constituency: Kathumar
- In office 2008–2013
- Preceded by: Ramesh Chand Khinchi
- Succeeded by: Mangal Ram Koli
- Constituency: Kathumar
- In office 1980–1990
- Preceded by: Ganga Sahai
- Succeeded by: Jagan Nath Pahadia
- Constituency: Kathumar

Personal details
- Born: 5 November 1953 Ronijathan, Alwar district, Rajasthan, India
- Died: 3 May 2026 (aged 72) Jaipur, Rajasthan, India
- Party: Indian National Congress
- Spouse: Rajanti Devi
- Parents: Chhuttan Lal Bairwa (father); Dhapa Devi (mother)

Babulal Bairwa (5 November 1953 – 3 May 2026) was an Indian politician and MLA of the Rajasthan Legislative Assembly from Kathumar Assembly constituency. He was a member of the Indian National Congress. Bairwa died from complications of diabetes at the Sawai Man Singh Hospital in Jaipur, on 3 May 2026, at the age of 72.
