= Nadbai Assembly constituency =

Legislative Assembly constituency in Rajasthan State, India

Coordinates: 27.22°N 77.20°E

Nadbai
- Constituency No. 74 for the Rajasthan Legislative Assembly

Constituency details
- Country: India
- Region: North India
- State: Rajasthan
- District: Bharatpur
- Lok Sabha constituency: Bharatpur
- Established: 1962
- Total electors: 291,897
- Reservation: None

Member of Legislative Assembly
- 16th Rajasthan Legislative Assembly
- Incumbent Jagat Singh
- Party: Bhartiya Janta Party

Nadbai Assembly constituency is one of the 200 Legislative Assembly constituencies of Rajasthan state in India.

It is part of Bharatpur district.

== Members of the Legislative Assembly ==
Year	Member	Party
2023	Jagat Singh	Bharatiya Janta Party
2018	Joginder Singh Awana	Bahujan Samaj Party
2013	Krishnendra Kaur	Bharatiya Janata Party
2008	Krishnendra Kaur (Deepa)	Bharatiya Janata Party
2003	Krishnendra Kaur	Independent
1998	Yashvant Singh (Ramu)	Independent politician
1993	Vishwender Singh	Indian National Congress
1990	Yadunath Singh	Janata Dal
1985	Yadunath Singh	Lokdal
1980	Yadunath Singh	Janata Party
1977	Hari krishan	Janata Party
1972	Natha Singh	Indian National Congress
1967	Nathi Lal	Independent
1962	Nathi Lal	Independent

== Election results ==
=== 2023 ===
2023 Rajasthan Legislative Assembly election: Nadbai
Party	Candidate	Votes	%	±%
BJP	Jagat Singh	103,795	50.15	+24.25
INC	Joginder Singh Awana S/O Girwar Singh	88,028	42.53	+21.46
BSP	Khaimkaran Singh Tauli	10,301	4.98	−23.19
NOTA	None of the above	570	0.28	−0.39
Majority		15,767	7.62	+5.35
Turnout		206,955	70.9	+1.91
BJP gain from BSP		Swing		

=== 2018 ===
2018 Rajasthan Legislative Assembly election: Nadbai
Party	Candidate	Votes	%	±%
BSP	Joginder Singh Awana	50,976	28.17	
BJP	Krishnendra Kaur (Deepa)	46,882	25.9	
INC	Dr. Himanshu Katara	38,136	21.07	
Independent	Khaim Karan Singh Touli	29,529	16.32	
Independent	Ajay Katara	6,399	3.54	
RLP	Vijendra singh Deshwal	4,845	2.68	
NOTA	None of the above	1,214	0.67	
Majority		4,094	2.27	
Turnout		180,985	68.99	
BSP gain from BJP		Swing		

=== 2013 ===
2013 Rajasthan Legislative Assembly election: Nadbai
Party	Candidate	Votes	%	±%
BJP	Krishnendra Kaur (Deepa)	60,990	39.13	
BSP	Ghanshyam (BABA)	46434	29.79	
INC	Girish chaudhary	34111	21.88	
LJP	Sumran Singh	7571	4.86	
NOTA	Nota	1146	0.74	
Independent	Surjeet singh (CHHUTTAN DON)	922	0.59	
Independent	Devendra singh Fauzdar	808	0.52	
Indian Peoples Green Party	Dalchand	698	0.45	
Independent	Sunita singh	653	0.421	
Jai Bharat Samanta Party	Sughad singh	650	0.42	
Independent	Vipas Mohan	607	0.39	
Independent	Aishwarya Singh	376	0.24	
National Unionist Zamindara Party	Dungar singh	228	0.15	
Bharatiya Bahujan Party	Nobat Singh Jatab	211	0.14	
Jago Party	Ramesh Chand	167	0.11	
Bharatiya Yuva Shakti	Ramjilal	163	0.10	
Rajasthan Vikas Party	Narendra Kumar Sharma	141	0.09	
Margin of victory		14556	9.41	
Turnout		155876	69.51	
BJP win				
BJP hold		Swing		

=== 2008 ===
2008 Rajasthan Legislative Assembly election: Nadbai
Party	Candidate	Votes	%	±%
BJP	Krishnendra Kaur (Deepa)	45,495	35.09	
BSP	Yashavant Singh Ramu	39315	30.33	
INC	Gireesh Kumar	33156	25.58	
SP	PT. Ramkishan	6332	4.88	
Independent	Sirmohar Singh	1200	0.93	
Rajasthan Vikas Party	Toran Singh	630	0.49	
Independent	Keshav Dev	583	0.45	
Independent	Mohar Singh	581	0.45	
RLD	Surendra Singh	514	0.40	
LJP	Navab singh	481	0.37	
Akhil Bharat Hindu Mahasabha	Naval singh	434	0.34	
Independent	LAKHAN SINGH KUSHAVAH	367	0.28	
Independent	Bharat Singh	223	0.17	
Indian People's Congress	Megh Singh	200	0.15	
JD(S)	Bhagwan Singh	124	0.10	
Margin of victory		6180	4.77	
Turnout		129635	64.4	
BJP win				
BJP gain from Independent		Swing		

=== 2003 ===
2003 Rajasthan Legislative Assembly election: Nadbai
Party	Candidate	Votes	%	±%
Independent	Krishnendra Kaur (Deepa)	27,299	28.73	
BSP	Sanjay Singh	20,239	21.30	
INC	Yashavant Singh Ramu	19,150	20.15	
BJP	Jitendra Singh	13,949	14.68	
Rajasthan Samajik Nyaya Manch	Bhajan Lal Sharma	5,969	6.28	
RLD	Swaraj Devi	3802	4.00	
Independent	Nawab Singh	1194	1.26	
NCP	Chandra Kanta Singh	924	0.97	
Independent	Panna Lal	900	0.95	
Rashtriya Parivartan Dal	Ramendera Singh	617	0.65	
SS	Bablu	507	0.53	
Independent	Gordhan Singh	468	0.49	
Margin of victory		7060	7.43	
Turnout		95018	69.75	
Independent win				
Independent hold		Swing		

=== 1998 ===
1998 Rajasthan Legislative Assembly election: Nadbai
Party	Candidate	Votes	%	±%
Independent	Yashavant Singh Ramu	16,623	20.67	
INC	Natthi Singh	12824	15.94	
Independent	Ghamandi Singh	8582	10.67	
BSP	Govind Singh	6496	8.08	
Independent	Rambabu	6415	7.98	
BJP	Surender Singh	5348	6.65	
Independent	LT.COL.Ram Saneshi Singh Deshwal	4195	5.22	
Independent	RADHEY LAL	4063	5.05	
Independent	Rukmani	3673	4.57	
JD	Kamal Singh	3567	4.43	
Independent	Dharam Singh	2761	3.43	
Independent	Navab singh	2334	2.90	
CPI	Ghandhi Dev	1642	2.04	
Independent	Ved Prakash	1078	1.34	
Independent	Om Prakash	837	1.04	
Margin of victory		3799	4.72	
Turnout		80438	70.26	
Independent win				
Independent gain from INC		Swing		

=== 1993 ===
1993 Rajasthan Legislative Assembly election: Nadbai
Party	Candidate	Votes	%	±%
INC	Vishwender Singh	53,745	65.88	
JD	Yadunath Singh	20367	24.96	
BJP	Daram Vir Singh	4656	5.71	
SP	Satish Tiwari	660	0.81	
Independent	Hari Charan	532	0.65	
Independent	Kanchan Lal	458	0.56	
DOORDARSHI PARTY	Gajender Singh	406	0.50	
Independent	Siya Ram	314	0.38	
Independent	Bhim Singh Gurjar	187	0.23	
Independent	Sughar Singh	76	0.09	
Independent	Rewati Prasad	76	0.09	
Independent	Rajnarain	73	0.09	
Independent	Amar Singh	33	0.04	
Margin of victory		33378	40.91	
Turnout		81583	71.12	
INC win				
INC gain from JD		Swing		

=== 1990 ===
1990 Rajasthan Legislative Assembly election: Nadbai
Party	Candidate	Votes	%	±%
JD	Yadunath Singh	27,845	45.01	
INC	Sujan Singh	16999	27.48	
Independent	Ghamandi Singh	10208	16.50	
Independent	Revati Prasad Jatav	2228	3.60	
Independent	Chandra Kanta Singh	2026	3.28	
Independent	Randhir Singh	782	1.26	
DOORDARSHI PARTY	Gajender Singh	608	0.98	
Independent	Nawab Singh	409	0.66	
Independent	Kaushalendra Singh	314	0.51	
SOCIALIST PARTY	Mahavir Singh	149	0.24	
Independent	Nahar singh	90	0.15	
AKHIL BHARATIYA HINDU MAHASABHA	Udai Ram Jindal	87	0.14	
Independent	Brajendra Singh	67	0.11	
Independent	Nathi Lal	46	0.07	
Margin of victory		10846	17.53	
Turnout		61858	59.63	
JD win				
JD gain from LKD		Swing		

=== 1985 ===
1985 Rajasthan Legislative Assembly election: Nadbai
Party	Candidate	Votes	%	±%
LKD	Yadunath Singh	22,750	50.71	
INC	Madhuban Singh	11605	25.87	
INC(J)	Ghanshyam Sharma	9282	20.69	
Independent	Gajendra Singh	471	1.05	
Independent	Gyasi Ram	385	0.86	
Independent	Padam Singh	373	0.83	
Margin of victory		11145	24.84	
Turnout		44866	52.80	
LKD win				
LKD gain from JNP(SC)		Swing		

=== 1980 ===
1980 Rajasthan Legislative Assembly election: Nadbai
Party	Candidate	Votes	%	±%
JNP(SC)	Yadunath Singh	16599	34.38	
INC(U)	Ghan shyam	12138	25.14	
INDIAN NATIONAL CONGRESS (I)	Moti Lal Parashar	10425	21.59	
JANATA PARTY (JP)	Girraj Singh	5573	11.54	
Independent	Ram Pratap	1372	2.84	
Independent	Girwar Prasad	579	1.20	
JANATA PARTY (SR)	Girdhar Singh	451	0.93	
Independent	Padam Singh	342	0.71	
Independent	Het Ram	274	0.57	
Independent	Nathi Lal	209	0.43	
Independent	Bhagwan Singh	197	0.41	
Independent	Balvir Singh	126	0.26	
Margin of victory		4461	9.24	
Turnout		48283	64.74	
JNP(SC) hold		Swing		

=== 1977 ===
1977 Rajasthan Legislative Assembly election: Nadbai
Party	Candidate	Votes	%	±%
JP	Hari Krishan	22,146	47.99	
INC	SUJAN SINGH	8372	18.14	
Independent	RAM CHARAN	4706	10.20	
Independent	JAGDISH PRASAD SHARMA	3259	7.06	
Independent	BAL BIR SINGH	2688	5.82	
Independent	GIRDHAR SINGH	2194	4.75	
Independent	SUNDER SINGH	1015	2.20	
Independent	RAJENDRA PRASAD	927	2.01	
Independent	YAD RAM SINGH	266	0.58	
Independent	LAXMAN	212	0.46	
Independent	SURAJMAL	163	0.35	
Independent	SUMERA	114	0.25	
Independent	ARUN SINGH	87	0.19	
Margin of victory		13774	29.85	
Turnout		46149	69.54	
JP win				
JP gain from INC		Swing		

=== 1972 ===
1972 Rajasthan Legislative Assembly election: Nadbai
Party	Candidate	Votes	%	±%
INC	NATHA SINGH	21,501	46.55	
BHARATIYA JANA SANGH	RATTAN LAL	18058	39.10	
Independent	NATHI LAL	2341	5.07	
SAMYUKTA SOCIALIST PARTY	RAMJI LAL	1820	3.94	
SWATANTRA PARTY	SUNDER SINGH	1497	3.24	
Independent	TIKAM	969	2.10	
Margin of victory		3443	7.45	
Turnout		46186	66.38	
INC win				
INC gain from Independent		Swing		

=== 1967 ===
1967 Rajasthan Legislative Assembly election: Nadbai
Party	Candidate	Votes	%	±%
Independent	NATHI LAL	12,110	36.05	
SANGHATA SOCIALIST PARTY	SUKHCHAND	10531	31.35	
INC	SAATYAPAL	9104	27.10	
SWATANTRA PARTY	HARIPRASAD	1247	3.71	
Independent	TUNDA	604	1.80	
Margin of victory		1579	4.70	
Turnout		33596	58.20	
Independent win (new seat)				

== See also ==
- List of constituencies of the Rajasthan Legislative Assembly
- Bharatpur district
