= Ratan Singh (Bharatpur politician) =

Indian politician

Ratan Singh Jatav

Member of Parliament, Lok Sabha
- In office 2009-2014
- Preceded by: Vishvendra Singh
- Succeeded by: Bahadur Singh Koli
- Constituency: Bharatpur

Personal details
- Born: 1 February 1947 (age 79) Nagar, Bharatpur
- Party: Indian National Congress
- Spouse: Smt.Premlata
- Children: 5

Ratan Singh Jatav (born 1 February 1947) is an Indian politician who was a member of the Lok Sabha from Bharatpur Lok Sabha constituency in Rajasthan. His educational qualification is B. E. He is elected from Indian National Congress political party. He was elected as Member of Parliament for the first time in 2009 elections.
