= Ashwani Kumar Bansal =

Former Vice Chancellor

Personal details
- Born: 4 November 1951 (age 74)
- Occupation: Professor, Vice-Chancellor
- Profession: Teaching, Administration

Ashwani Kumar Bansal was an Indian legal educational administrator. He was Vice-Chancellor of two Universities Maharaja Surajmal Brij University and Raj Rishi Bhartrihari Matsya University.

== Career ==
He previously worked at University of Delhi. He started BA.LLB and BBA.LLB in Maharaja Surajmal Brij University, in Bharatpur, Rajasthan in 2018. He also introduced MSB Law Journal in 2018.

== Books ==
- Bansal, Ashwani Kumar. Book on Copyright law of India (2014 ed.).
- Bansal, Ashwani Kumar. Law of Trade Marks in India (2013 ed.). Thomson Reuter, 3rd edition. ISBN 978-9381082942.
- Bansal, Ashwani Kumar (2012). Designs Law (2012 ed.). Universal Law Publishing Co, Delhi. ISBN 978-9350351642.
- Bansal, Ashwani Kumar (2012). International Commercial Arbitration Practice & Procedure Enforcement of Foreign Awards (2009 ed.). Universal Law Publishing - An imprint of LexisNexis (2012). ISBN 978-9350351291.
