= Subhash Garg =

Indian politician (born 1959)

Minister of State, Government of Rajasthan
- In office 22 November 2021 – 3 December 2023
- Governor: Kalraj Mishra
- Chief Minister: Ashok Gehlot
- Ministry and Departments: List: * Ayurveda and Indian System of Medicine (I/C); Public Grievance Redressal (I/C); Technical Education (I/C); Minority Affairs; Colonisation; Agriculture Irrigated Area Development and Water Utility; Waqf
- Preceded by: Self
- Succeeded by: Prem Chand Bairwa
- In office 24 December 2018 – 21 November 2021
- Chief Minister: Ashok Gehlot
- Ministry and Departments: List: * Technical Education (I/C); Sanskrit Education (I/C); Ayurveda and Indian System of Medicine; Medical and Health; Medical and Health Services (ESI); Information and Public Relations
- Preceded by: Kiran Maheshwari
- Succeeded by: Self

Member of the Rajasthan Legislative Assembly
- Incumbent
- Assumed office 11 December 2018
- Preceded by: Vijay Bansal
- Constituency: Bharatpur

Personal details
- Born: Subhash Garg Pipla; 15 August 1959 (age 67) Pipla, Bharatpur District, Rajasthan
- Party: Rashtriya Lok Dal (NDA)

Subhash Garg Pipla (born 15 August 1959) is an Indian politician and former State Minister Government of Rajasthan. He is a Member of Rajasthan Legislative Assembly from Bharatpur Assembly constituency. He is a politician of the Rashtriya Lok Dal.
