= Maharaja Surajmal Brij University =

Indian university

Coordinates: 27.2795°N 77.3854°E

- Former names: Brij University, Bharatpur
- Motto in English: Knowledge is the greatest eye
- Type: Public
- Established: 2012 (14 years ago)
- Affiliations: UGC
- Chancellor: Governor of Rajasthan
- Vice-Chancellor: Dr. Ramesh Chandra, PhD, FRSC
- Location: Chak Sakeetra, Kumher, Rajasthan, India
- Website: msbrijuniversity.ac.in//

Maharaja Surajmal Brij University, formerly Brij University, Bharatpur, is a state university located at Bharatpur, Rajasthan, India. The main University campus is located outside of the main city in the Kumher region of the district housing academic block, administrative block, examination section building and residential buildings.

== History ==
Brij University, Bharatpur was established in 2012 by the Government of Rajasthan through Brij University, Bharatpur Act, 2012 and K. D. Swami was appointed as the founder Vice Chancellor (VC). The Chancellor of the institute is the Governor of Rajasthan. In 2014, in commemoration of Maharaja Surajmal, it was renamed Maharaja Surajmal Brij University, Bharatpur through Brij University, Bharatpur (Change of Name) Act, 2014. In April 2016 Swami quit his position, citing harassment by Vijay Bansal as the cause, while Bansal accused Swami of "administrative and financial irregularities". Ashwani Kumar Bansal was appointed VC in February 2017 and R.K.S. Dhakarey replaced him in February 2020. The university’s current Vice-Chancellor is Prof. Ramesh Chandra, PhD, FRSC (London) from University of Delhi.

== Affiliated colleges ==
The university affiliates colleges from three districts of Rajasthan, Bharatpur, Dheeg and Dholpur. As of 2019, the university has three affiliated law colleges, 23 B.Ed/M.Ed. colleges, 16 U.G./P.G. colleges and 19 B.Ed. & integrated colleges. Notable affiliated colleges include Maharani Shri Jaya College.

== See also ==
- Maharaja Surajmal Institute of Technology
