= Raj Bahadur =

Indian politician (1912–1990)

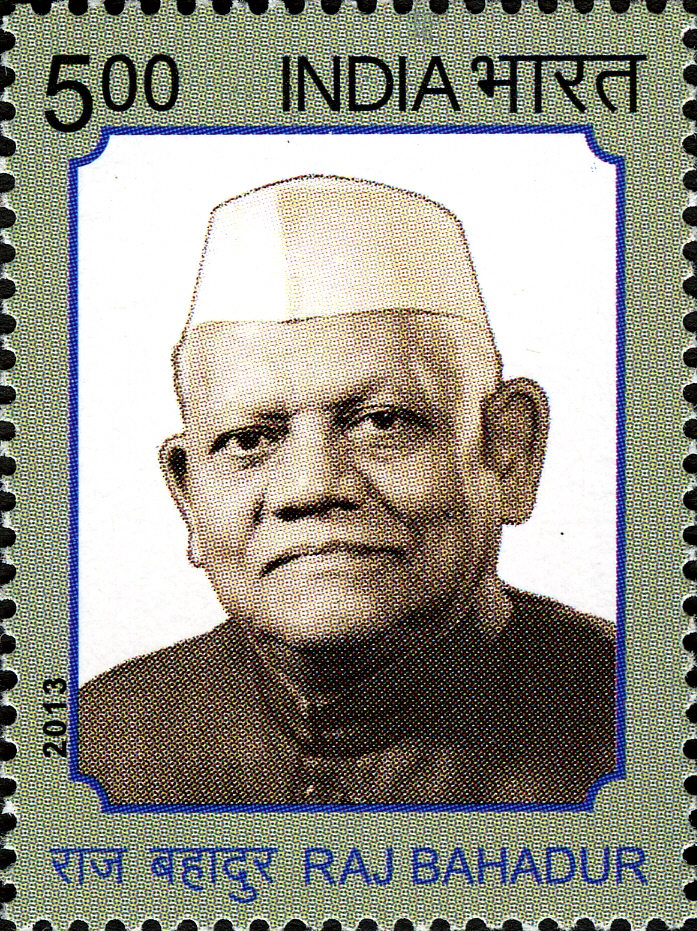
- Raj Bahadur on a 2013 stamp of India

India Ambassador to Nepal
- In office January 1968 – January 1971

Ministry of Tourism and Civil Aviation
- In office 9 November 1973 – 22 December 1976
- Preceded by: Karan Singh
- Succeeded by: Kotha Raghuramaiah

Ministry of Communications
- In office 7 December 1956 – 17 April 1957
- Preceded by: Jagjivan Ram
- Succeeded by: Lal Bahadur Shastri

Member of Parliament, Lok Sabha
- In office 1957–1967
- In office 1971–1977
- Constituency: Bharatpur, Rajasthan

Personal details
- Born: 21 August 1912 Basan Gate, Bharatpur (present-day Rajasthan, India)
- Died: 22 September 1990 (aged 78) New Delhi, India
- Political party: Indian National Congress
- Education: Bachelor of Laws; Master of Arts

Babu Raj Bahadur (21 August 1912- 22 September 1990) was a leader of the Indian National Congress from Rajasthan. He served as cabinet minister for Ministry of Tourism, Ministry of Civil Aviation and Ministry of Communications in Government of India. He was India ambassador to Nepal from 1968 to 1971. He was elected to the Lok Sabha, lower house of the Parliament for three terms from Bharatpur, Rajasthan.

== Early life and education ==
Babu Raj Bahadur was born on August 21, 1912, in Bharatpur (present-day Rajasthan, India). He earned degrees in M.A. (Master of Arts), B.Sc. (Bachelor of Science), and L.L.B. (Bachelor of Laws).

== Career ==
=== Freedom Struggle and Leadership ===
Raj Bahadur actively participated in India's freedom struggle. He led the Indian Independence movement in Bharatpur State (now Rajasthan) from 1940 to 1947. During this period, he was arrested twice for his involvement in the movement.

=== Constituent Assembly of India ===
After independence, he became a member of the Constituent Assembly of India from Rajasthan. His contributions during the constitutional drafting process were valuable.

=== Lok Sabha ===
Raj Bahadur was elected to the Lok Sabha (lower house of Parliament) three times from the Bharatpur constituency in Rajasthan. He served as a Member of Parliament (MP) during the terms 1957–1962, 1962–1967, and 1971–1977.

=== Ministerial Roles ===
He served as cabinet minister for Ministry of Tourism and Ministry of Communications in Government of India.

=== India’s Ambassador to Nepal ===
From 1968 to 1971, Raj Bahadur served as India's ambassador to Nepal. His diplomatic role strengthened bilateral relations between the two countries.

== Death ==
He died on September 22, 1990, in New Delhi.
