= Digamber Singh =

Indian politician (1951–2017)

Dr. Digamber Singh
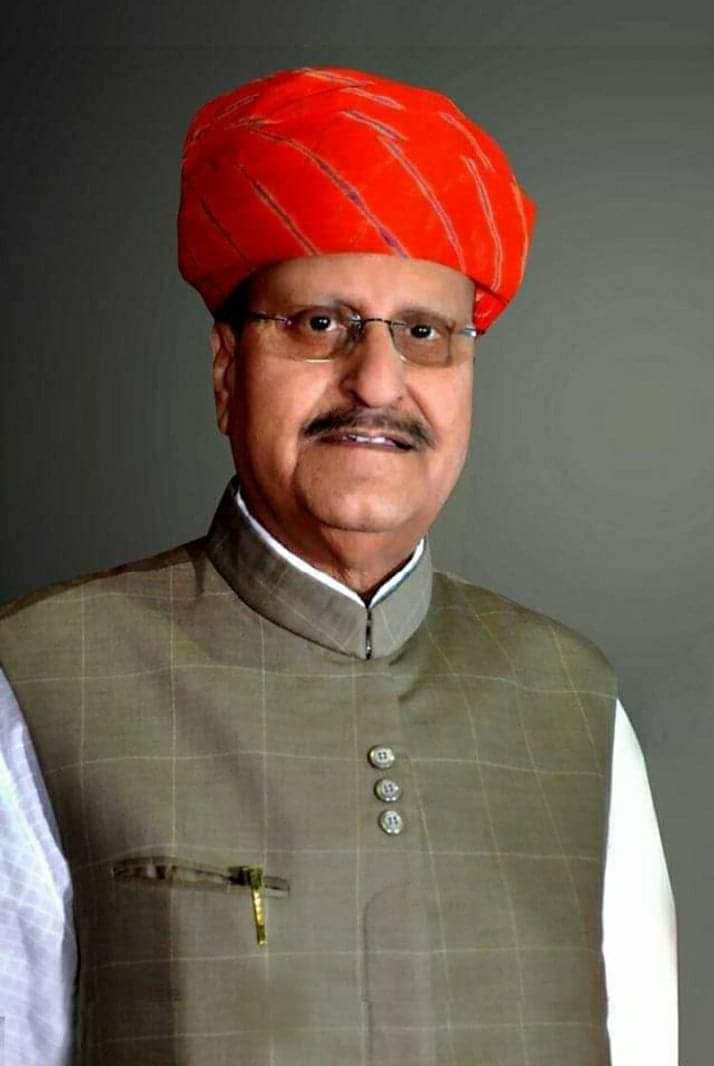
- Singh in 2016

Chairman of the Twenty Point Programme
- In office 3 May 2015 - 27 October 2017
- Preceded by: Vasundhara Raje
- Succeeded by: Chandrabhan (INC)

Cabinet Minister Panchayati Raj, Social Justice, Law and Agriculture, Government of Rajasthan
- In office 8 August 2016 - 27 October 2017

Vice President of Bharatiya Janata Party, Rajasthan
- In office 2013 - 2015

Cabinet Minister for Industries, Government of Rajasthan
- In office 2008 - 2009
- Succeeded by: Shanti Dhariwal, INC

Cabinet Minister for Health, Ayurveda and Family Welfare, Government of Rajasthan
- In office 2003 - 2008
- Succeeded by: Narpat Singh Rajvi, BJP

Member of the Rajasthan Legislative Assembly
- In office 1993 - 2013
- Succeeded by: Vishvendra Singh, INC
- Constituency: Deeg-Kumher

President of Bharatiya Janata Party, Bharatpur
- In office 1991 - 1994

Personal details
- Born: 1 October 1951 Barkhera Faujdar, Bharatpur, Rajasthan
- Died: 27 October 2017 (aged 66) Jaipur, Rajasthan, India
- Party: Bharatiya Janata Party
- Spouse: Asha Singh
- Children: 2
- Education: SN Medical College
- Profession: Doctor and politician
- Awards: Lohagarh Sapoot Award 2006

Digamber Singh (1 October 1951 – 27 October 2017) was an Indian politician, who served as a Cabinet Minister in the Government of Rajasthan. Singh spent over two decades as a Member of the Legislative Assembly, representing the Kumher Assembly constituency, later renamed as Deeg-Kumher. He held numerous imperative Cabinet portfolios in the Government of Rajasthan, including Minister of Health, Ayurveda, Family Welfare and from 2009 onwards as the Minister of Industries.

He was the chairman of the Twenty Point Programme and held additional charges of the Ministries of Panchayati raj, Law, Agriculture and Social justice in the Government of Rajasthan. A prominent Jat leader, Singh was considered the face of the Bharatiya Janata Party in Eastern Rajasthan.

== Early life and education ==
Digamber Singh was born on 1 October 1951 to a Hindu Jat family in the Bharatpur village of Barkhera Faujdar in Rajasthan. He was the second of six children. His father, Jawahar Singh, was a ‘Patwaari’ and his mother, Ramkali Devi, a home maker. His early education took place in Nagar, Rajasthan and secondary education in Jaipur. In 1973, he completed his MMBS from Dr. Sampurnanand Medical College in Jodhpur, Rajasthan.

Shortly after obtaining a degree in surgery and medicine, Singh began experiencing symptoms of muscle weakness and regular fatigue, and was hospitalised in AIIMS for a stroke. He convalesced at a hospital in New Delhi for a little less than a year before continuing his treatment at home. It took approximately two years to make a full recovery.

== Medicine ==
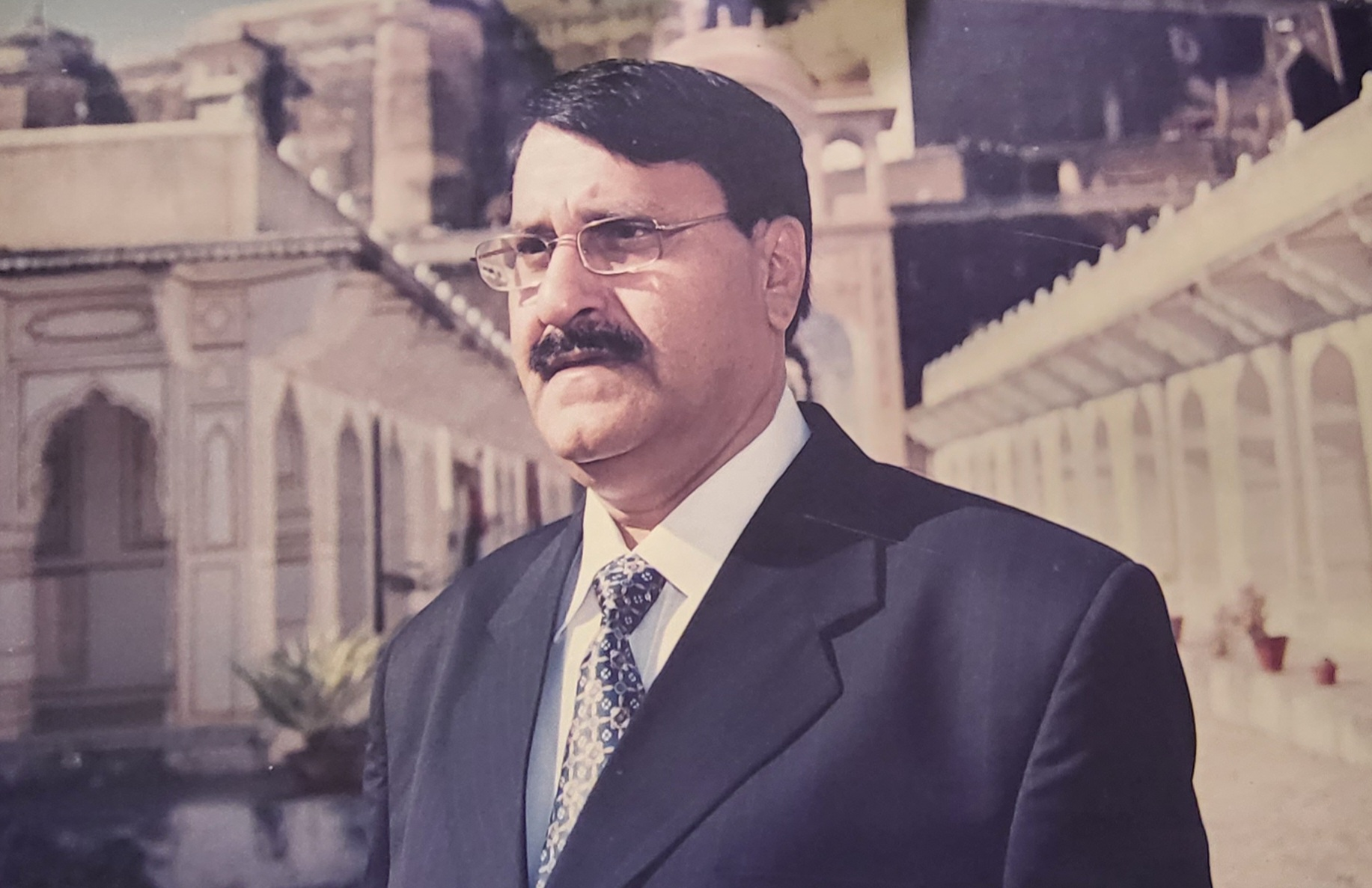
Singh in Jodhpur, 2004

Singh joined the state government's Department of Medicine as an obstetrician in 1977, initially in Nagar tehsil and later Kumher in Bharatpur, Rajasthan. In 1985, he left to open a private hospital, Shree Digamber Hospital, in Bharatpur. It is now known as the Shree Digamber Group of Hospitals. His years as an active medical practitioner are believed to have paved way for his political career. He resigned from the Department of Medicine in 1992 to pursue politics.

== Political career ==
=== Early career ===
Singh joined the Bharatiya Janata Party (BJP) in the late 1980s and served as the party's Bharatpur president between 1994 and 1997. Although, he is said to have been hesitant from stepping into politics, he was convinced by party leaders as Om Prakash Mathur and Lalit Kishore Chaturvedi. He was elected to the 10th Rajasthan National Assembly in 1993 from Kumher at the age of 43. He stood for Lok Sabha in the 1996 general election but lost to Natwar Singh. He was re-elected to the Rajasthan National Assembly in 1998 and, as an opposition leader, was critical of the state congress government's negligence towards development projects in eastern Rajasthan.

=== Minister of Health, Ayurveda & Family Welfare ===
In 2003, he won a seat in the assembly elections from Kumher for the third consecutive time and was further appointed Minister of Health and Family Welfare in the Government of Rajasthan under Chief Minister Vasundhara Raje. During Singh's tenure, there were multiple government poverty relief schemes and programmes in Rajasthan, such as free testing for dengue to help control the disease.

In 2007, Singh introduced a programme to improve government health facilities and opened services centres at the panchayat level with the intention of making it more accessible to the poor. In 2008, along with Norway's Prime Minister Jens Stoltenberg, Singh launched the Rajasthan-Norway joint health programme, which aimed to eradicate polio and modernise existing facilities and infrastructure.

In 2016, during Rajendra Singh Rathore's tenure as Health Minister, a major strike of resident doctors and staff was called-off after Singh brokered a deal between the government and the unions.

In 2006, Dr. Digamber Singh, launched a state-wide mission to build stat-of-the-art medical research facilities in Rajasthan. Singh believed in strengthening the inventory capacity of the state medical staff by providing them research facilities and resources to undertake pioneering medical research.

On 15 August 2006, Singh inaugurated the latest bypass surgery facilities, established by Bharat Vikas Parishad Hospital and Research Centre, in New Delhi, a subsidiary of the facilities in Kota, Rajasthan.

Dr. Singh's tenure as Health Minister is also recalled for its crackdown on illegal and criminal medical practises in the state. Singh would monthly review data on criminal cases being reported in hospitals and government medical facilities in the state. These review meetings would often include district-level officers as Collectors and SPs, who were immediately instructed to take action.

Dr. Digamber Singh's popularity among the party rank and files and among the people was surging rapidly in the years 2003 onwards. In 2007, the much contentious, Gurjar agitation in Rajasthan took place. The agitation almost paralysed government machinery in Eastern Rajasthan and propelled Chief Minister Vasundhara Raje to take drastic measures to ensure law and order prevailed. Amidst heightened tension, Chief Minister Raje assigned the responsibility to mediate with agitators to her cabinet colleague, Dr. Digamber Singh. After various rounds of dialogues between the government and the agitators, over a period of nine months, the agitation was finally called off in September 2008. Following the development News 18 journalist Pratap Rao called Singh the "troubleshooting Minister" of the Government.

=== Minister of Industries ===
Singh was appointed Rajasthan's Cabinet Minister for Industries in 2009. Under his leadership, numerous multi-dynamic urban and residential projects were implemented within the state and the FDI level rose by 9% as multiple special economic zones were introduced.

At Singh's behest, the Indian government opened the Indian Institutes of Technology campuses in Rajasthan.[27][28] The Rajasthan Government, under Singh, initiated ‘FIESTA’ events at engineering institutions in a bid to engage rural talent and open collaborative opportunities abroad.[29]

=== Member of Legislative Assembly (2008 - 2013) ===
Prior to the 2008 Rajasthan Assembly elections, delimitation of electoral constituencies took place and Bharatpur's parliamentary seat was reserved, while Singh's Kumher constituency was merged with Deeg to form the Deeg-Kumher Assembly constituency. The BJP chose Singh as its candidate from Deeg-Kumher and the party's incumbent Member of Parliament, Vishvendra Singh, shifting loyalties, represented the Indian National Congress. Digamber Singh won the seat by a margin of 3514 votes. The 2008 election was the first instance, since independence, where the Royal Family of Bharatpur had to face a defeat. Dr. Singh's victory ensured the continuity of his unchallenged stronghold over the Jats of India. In a press-conference, after his victory against Bharatpur's royal scion, Singh said, “After defeating Vishvendra, I have put an end to two myths, one that Vishvendra is undefeatable, and the other that 13 (13 Civil Lines; his government residence) is an unlucky number” Singh would serve as a Member of the Legislative Assembly (MLA) after the BJP was voted out of power.

In 2009, a year after the state election, the state Bharatiya Janata Party was split into two camps, one that of former Chief Minister Vasundhara Raje, and the other of the party organisation or the Rashtriya Swayamsevak Sangh. Singh backed Raje, unconditionally, and was announced as the nominee for the State President of the party from her camp. However, a few days later, Singh backed down and instead garnered support for Raje from more than 50 legislators, leading to central leadership under Rajnath Singh, deterring from its decision to deny Raje's appointment.

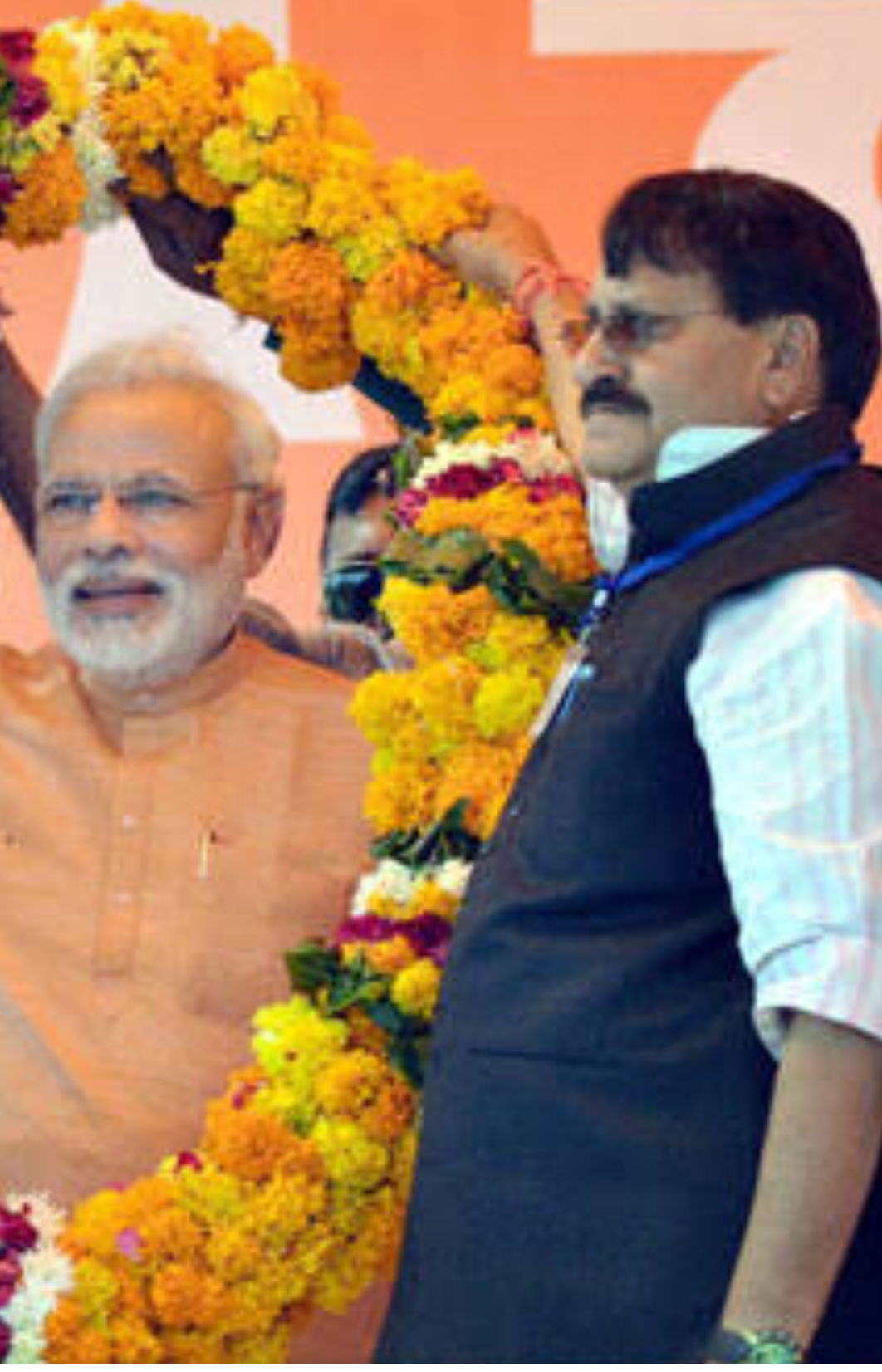
The Prime Minister of India, Narendra Modi, campaigns in support of Dr. Digamber Singh in Bharatpur, Rajasthan.

=== 2014 By-poll Election ===
In September 2014, he unsuccessfully contested the bypoll from Surajgarh in Jhunjhunu district of Rajasthan. Despite the storming of government heavyweights and Singh's relentless campaign, Surajgarh, meant to resurrect the fallen Singh, instead, pushed him down a cliff. The once all powerful Minister, had now lost two consecutive elections in a span of less than a year. Both being amidst an untameable frenzy for the Bharatiya Janata Party. A mere margin of 3,100 votes, from Surajgarh, had kept Singh away from the peak of his career. His consecutive defeats also chastened the newly formed government.

=== Chairman of Twenty Point Programme ===
In 2015, Dr. Digamber Singh declined Chief Minister Raje's request to be the BJP's nominee to the Rajya Sabha. Later that year, in a bid to bolster his influence the state Cabinet, Singh was appointed the Chairman of the Twenty Point Programme, a highly powerful government wing, and was accorded a Cabinet Minister status, giving him responsibility of 20 government ministries. Singh's appointment, despite two electoral jolts within a year, made clear his vitality to the government and the party. The opposition raised Singh's appointment as an evidence of the lack of confidence of the government on its elected representatives. The opposition further termed Singh's appointment as unconstitutional, as it surpassed the authority of elected members, serving as Cabinet Minister. The move was, however, strongly welcomed by the Jat Community across the nation. Intellectuals and policy makers too expressed confidence in Singh's appointment, knowing his acumen and abilities, plus the two decade long experience in government functioning. During his official visit to Sikar, in November 2016, Singh approved the establishment of a medical college in the district, by the year 2018. The demand for a medical college had long been a priority issue for the region.

=== Additional Charge of the Ministries of Law, Social Justice, Panchayati Raj and Agriculture ===
On 9 August 2016, a gazette notification, by the Government of Rajasthan, proclaimed a council, responsible for the monitoring of major schemes, initiatives and projects under the Ministry of Panchayati Raj, Ministry of Law, Ministry of Agriculture and Irrigation, and the Ministry of Social Justice and Empowerment.

=== Membership of Assembly and Portfolios Held in the Cabinet ===
Membership of the Rajasthan Legislative Assembly
Assembly	Tenure	Constituency	Party
10th	1993-1998	Kumher	Bharatiya Janata Party
11th	1998-2003	Kumher	Bharatiya Janata Party
12th	2003-2008	Kumher	Bharatiya Janata Party
13th	2008-2013	Kumher	Bharatiya Janata Party

Positions held in the Government of Rajasthan
S. No	Rank	Portfolio	Tenure
1.	Cabinet Minister	Medical and Health, Medical Services (ESI).	2003-2008
2.	Cabinet Minister	Ayurveda & Indian Medical Methods.	2003-2008
3.	Cabinet Minister	Family Welfare	2003-2008
4.	Cabinet Minister	Industry	2008-2009
5.	Cabinet Minister	Twenty Point Programme	2015-2017
6.	Cabinet Minister	Rural Development & Panchayati raj (Additional Charge)	2016-2017
7.	Cabinet Minister	Social justice (Additional Charge)	2016-2017
8.	Cabinet Minister	Law (Additional Charge)	2016-2017
9.	Cabinet Minister	Agriculture (Additional Charge)	2016-2017

== Illness, death and aftermath ==
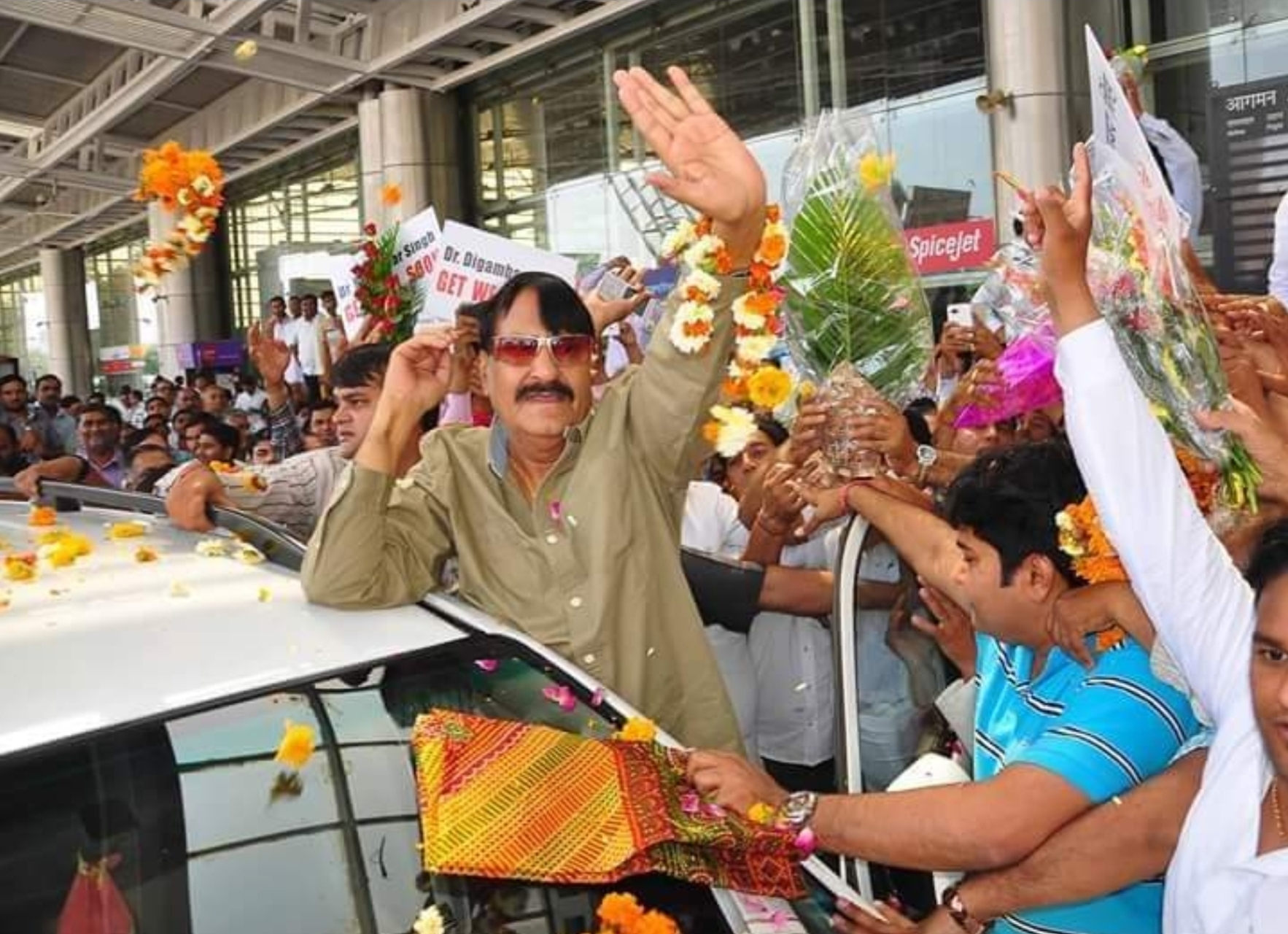
Supporters welcome Dr. Singh home after his surgery in the United States, June 2015

While campaigning in the 2015 Delhi Legislative Assembly election, Singh began complaining of back pain and shortly after was diagnosed with pancreatic cancer. He received initial treatment and underwent surgery at the Memorial Sloan Kettering Cancer Center in New York City, USA. The surgery was considered successful by the Indian government but biographer Ramveer Singh Verma wrote that it was "partially successful" and that the doctors had been hesitant to operate. Thousands of supporters welcomed Singh at the Indira Gandhi International Airport and the Jaipur International Airport when he arrived home a month and a half later. He received chemotherapy at Sawai Man Singh Hospital in Jaipur and before undergoing another major surgery at the Lakeshore Hospital that October. The Indian government reported his second surgery to be "extraordinarily successful."

Singh underwent Radiotherapy at an undisclosed facility in Lisbon, Portugal. In 2016, as he took charge of additional ministries in the Rajasthan Government, the media reported significant improvisation in his well being. Dr. Digamber Singh was also appointed in-charge for the upcoming 2017 Uttar Pradesh Legislative Assembly election and campaigned for the party in the region. In early 2017, owing to health circumstances, Singh would discontinue his engagements in the state of Uttar Pradesh.

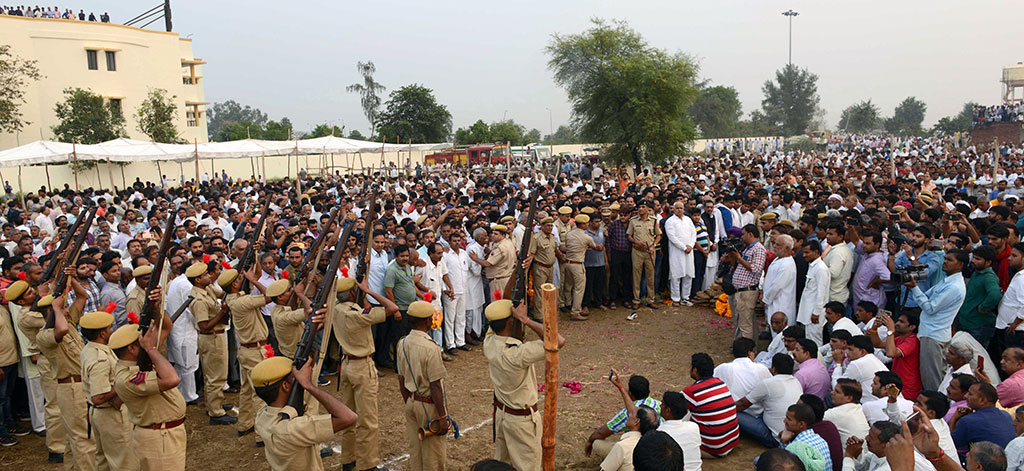
Singh's State Funeral, Bharatpur, 27 October 2017

In early 2017, Singh received chemotherapy at the Mount Elizabeth Hospital in Singapore, traveling there for his treatment more than 40 times in six months. It was discontinued in September 2017 due to negative side effects. Though he largely refrained from public appearances, he attended a celebration in Bharatpur for his 66th birthday. It was attended by over 300,000 people. Singh gave his last interview on 7 October with News 18 journalist Shripal Shekhawat and ten days later went to a Diwali celebration in Kumher, where he held his final press conference. He was rushed to the Eternal Heart Care Centre in Jaipur the next day after complaining of chest pain and was admitted for swine flu. Though he initially appeared to be improving gradually, his health worsened on 26 October and he died on 27 October. The team of doctors, led by Dr. RS. Khedar, stated for the prolonged illness of pancreatic cancer to be the prime cause in the sudden downfall of Singh's health. The cause of his death was concluded to be multiple organ failure, due to cancer and. The State Cabinet declared a state of mourning in Rajasthan and Singh was given full state honours and a 21-gun salute at his funeral, which was attended by more than 300,000 people. He was cremated at the Shree Digamber College of Nursing in Bharatpur.

After his death, the BJP struggled to maintain power. Party members increasingly began choosing between a more pro-Raje stance or a more pro-BJP leader stance. Separately, Singh's supporters began protesting for the Bharatpur Medical College to be renamed as the Dr. Digamber Singh Medical College or the DDS Medical College, Bharatpur. In 2018, a statue of Singh was erected at the Dr. Digamber Singh Nursing College in Bharatpur.

=== Aftermath ===
Dr. Digamber Singh's death, 14 months prior to the 2018 Rajasthan Legislative Assembly election, came as a big blow to the Bharatiya Janata Party. Singh, a mass leader, had a sway among the Jat Community and voters in Eastern Rajasthan, the void of which was evident in the assembly election the following year. In the 2018 election, the party won only 1 of the 19 assembly seats in Eastern Rajasthan, which was a major reason for its defeat.

Apart from his role and provisions as an elected representative and a powerful Minister, Singh was also well known for his take on social concerns. The Dr. Digamber Singh Pro Kabaddi Tournament, inaugurated in 2017, to proffer rural sports potential and provide rural athletes with international opportunities and financial assistance is one such example. The tournament's teams are based on the districts of the state of Rajasthan.

== Personal life ==
Singh married Asha Singh on 19 January 1976. They had two children, a daughter, Dr. Shilpi Singh (born 9 January 1979) and a son, Dr. Shailesh Digamber Singh (born 20 July 1980). Singh's son, Dr. Shailesh Digamber Singh, contested the 2018 Rajasthan Legislative Assembly election from Deeg-Kumher Assembly constituency in Bharatpur district. Shailesh lost by a margin of 8,120 votes against the Indian National Congress candidate. On 17 December 2019, he was appointed, President of Bharatiya Janata Party Bharatpur, a post held by his father in his early political career.
