= Jagat Singh (politician) =

Indian politician

Member of the Rajasthan Legislative Assembly
- Incumbent
- Assumed office December 2023
- Preceded by: Joginder Singh Awana
- Constituency: Nadbai
- In office 2013–2018
- Preceded by: Zahida Khan
- Succeeded by: Zahida Khan
- Constituency: Kaman
- In office 2003–2008
- Constituency: Laxmangarh

District Head Bharatpur
- In office 6 September 2021 – 17 December 2023

Personal details
- Born: 28 August 1968 (age 57) Delhi, India
- Party: Bhartiya Janta Party
- Other political affiliations: Indian National Congress
- Spouse: Soumaya Singh (m. 2007)
- Children: 2
- Parent(s): Natwar Singh (father); Heminder Kaur (mother)
- Education: B.B.A.
- Alma mater: University of Buckingham
- Occupation: Politician
- Profession: Agriculture

Jagat Singh (born 28 August 1968) is an Indian politician. Singh has been a member of the 12th, 14th and 16th Rajasthan legislative assemblies. He is currently a Member of the Rajasthan Legislative Assembly from the Nadbai Assembly constituency as a member of the Bharatiya Janata Party. Singh is the son of Natwar Singh, the former Minister of External Affairs of India, and Heminder Kaur, the daughter of Yadvindra Singh, the last Maharaja of Patiala, and the granddaughter of Maharaja Bhupinder Singh of Patiala.

Following the 2023 Rajasthan Legislative Assembly election, he was elected as a Member of the Legislative Assembly (MLA) from the Nadbai Assembly constituency, defeating Joginder Singh Awana, the candidate from the Indian National Congress (INC), by a margin of 15,767 votes.
