= Deeg-Kumher Assembly constituency =

Legislative Assembly constituency in Rajasthan State, India

Coordinates: 27.47°N 77.32°E

Deeg-Kumher
- Constituency for the Rajasthan Legislative Assembly

Constituency details
- Country: India
- Region: North India
- State: Rajasthan
- District: Bharatpur
- Lok Sabha constituency: Bharatpur
- Established: 2008
- Total electors: 257,527
- Reservation: None

Member of Legislative Assembly
- 16th Rajasthan Legislative Assembly
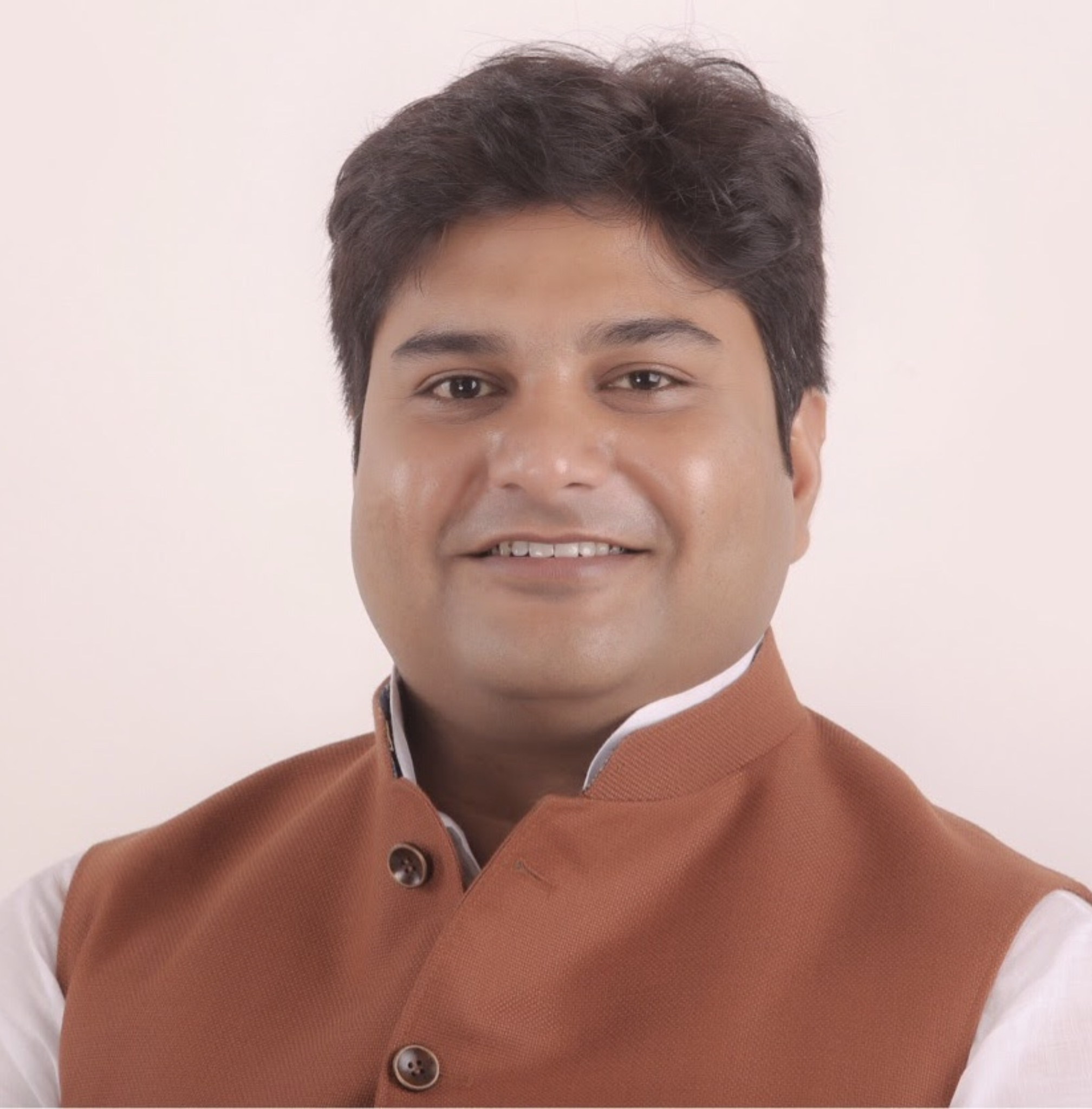
- Incumbent Dr. Shailesh Singh
- Party: Bharatiya Janata Party

Deeg-Kumher Assembly constituency is one of the 200 Legislative Assembly constituencies of Rajasthan state in India. It was established in 2008 after the delimitation of assembly constituencies. Dr. Digamber Singh was the inaugural Member of the Legislative Assembly from the constituency in 2008. Followed by Vishvendra Singh, King of the erstwhile Bharatpur State, for two terms in 2013 & 2018. Dr. Shailesh Singh, son of Dr. Digamber Singh, is the current Legislator from the constituency, serving since 3 December 2023. The constituency is part of the Deeg district.

== Members of the Legislative Assembly ==
Year	Member	Party
2008	Dr. Digamber Singh	Bharatiya Janata Party
2013	Vishvendra Singh	Indian National Congress
2018	Vishvendra Singh	Indian National Congress
2023	Dr. Shailesh Singh	Bharatiya Janata Party

== History ==
Deeg-Kumher assembly constituency, although relatively new in Rajasthan, has been identified as one of the state's most hot or contentious seats. The constituency, since its creation, has witnessed the clash between the Bharatpur Royal Family and the Singh Family. After Bharatiya Janata Party's Dr. Shailesh Singh's victory in the 2023 Rajasthan Legislative Assembly election, both families have inflicted two defeats on the other.

The Deeg-Kumher Assembly Constituency was created by merging the Deeg and Kumher Assembly Constituencies in the 2008 delimitation. In the same delimitation, the Bharatpur Lok Sabha constituency was reserved for the Scheduled Caste. Hence forcing, Vishvendra Singh, the King of the erstwhile Bharatpur state, to contest assembly election.

The Deeg assembly constituency was traditionally the stronghold of the Bharatpur Royal House. While, the Health & Industries Minister, Dr. Digamber Singh, was the sitting legislator from Kumher. The 2008 merger of the two constituencies led to the face-off between the former King of Bharatpur & the senior Bharatiya Janata Party leader serving as a Cabinet Minister.

Both Minister Digamber Singh and Member of Parliament, Lok Sabha, Vishvendra Singh, sought the Bharatiya Janata Party ticket from the seat. After much deference, the party chose Minister Singh to contest, denying Vishvendra the chance to contest. In response, the Maharaj of Bharatpur, shifting loyalties, joined the Indian National Congress to contest from the seat.

Digamber defeated Vishvendra by a margin of 3200 votes in the 2008 Rajasthan Legislative Assembly election. A rare defeat for the former king of Bharatpur in the Royal bastion.

Vishvendra beat Digamber in the 2013 election by a margin of 11,162 votes. This defeat was the revival of the Bharatpur Royal House in politics. The election was witness to high fuzz and emotionally manipulative appeals, including Vishvendra's wife campaigning in a white saree, worn by Indian women in case of death in family, to gain sympathy votes for her husband. The defeat was at the peak of Dr. Digamber Singh's career.

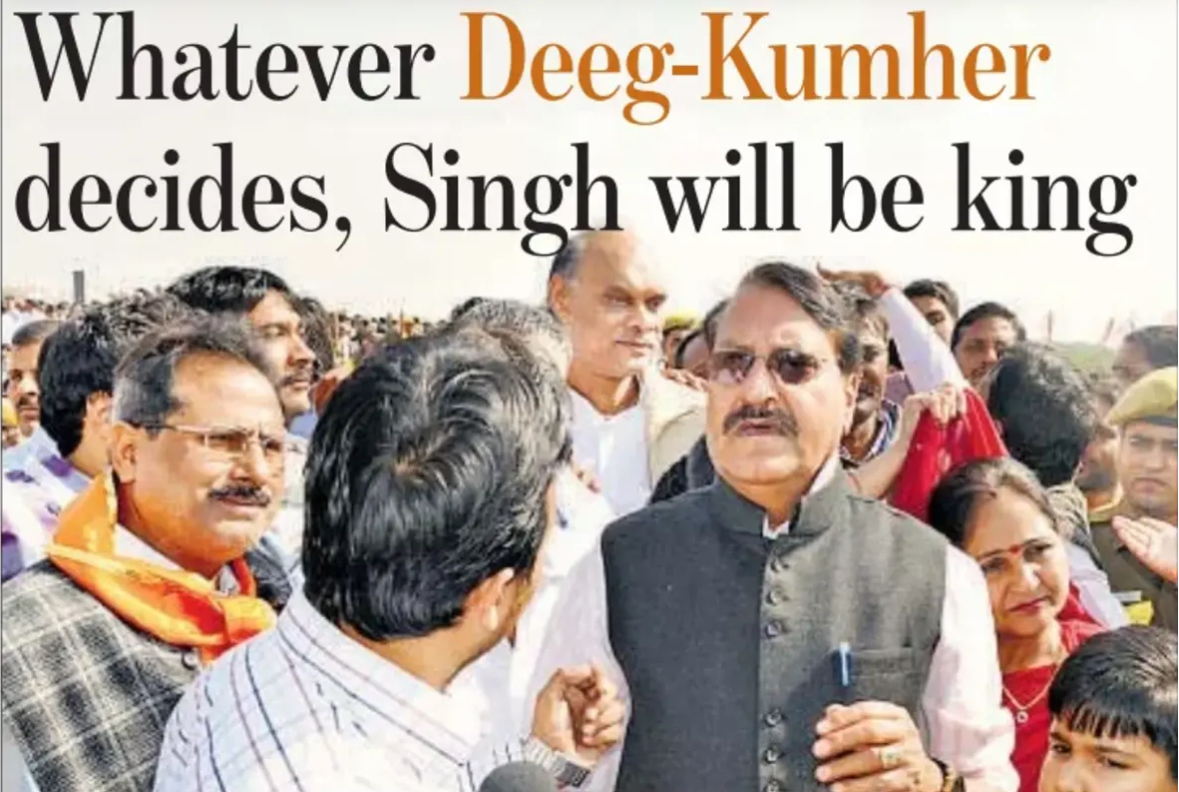
Hindustan Times publication, featuring then MLA Dr. Digamber Singh, during the 2013 Rajasthan Legislative Assembly elections.

Despite his defeat in the 2013 Rajasthan Legislative Assembly elections and the 2014 by poll election from Surajgarh Assembly constituency, Digamber Singh, was made the Chairman of Twenty Point Program and given a Cabinet Minister rank in the government. While Vishvendra remained an opposition legislator.

On 27 October 2017, after almost a four year long battle with cancer, Dr. Digamber Singh died at the age of 66. Singh's son Dr. Shailesh joined politics following the demise of his father. Shailesh contested against Vishvendra in the 2018 Rajasthan Legislative Assembly election. Vishvendra defeated Shailesh by a margin of 8000 votes, despite the sympathy wave for Shailesh's father - the Late Dr. Digamber Singh. Vishvendra Singh served as Cabinet Minister for Tourism in the Government of Rajasthan, following this win.

In the 2023 Rajasthan Legislative Assembly elections, with positions interchanged, Digamber Singh's family engaged in high drama to strengthen their hold. The result mended in their favour with Shailesh trouncing Vishvendra by a margin of 9,000 votes. The former King of Bharatpur had now faced defeat, both by Digamber and his son Shailesh.

Dr. Shailesh Singh, who goes by Dr. Shailesh Digamber Singh is the incumbent MLA from the constituency.

== Election results ==
=== 2023 ===
2023 Rajasthan Legislative Assembly election
Party	Candidate	Votes	%	±%
BJP	Dr. Shailesh Singh	89,063	50.09	+9.74
INC	Vishvendra Singh	81,168	45.65	+0.24
BSP	Hariom Sharma	4,487	2.52	−9.81
NOTA	None of the above	734	0.41	−0.26
Majority		7,895	4.44	−0.62
Turnout		177,818	69.05	+0.37
BJP hold		Swing		

=== 2018 ===
2018 Rajasthan Legislative Assembly election: Deeg-Kumher
Party	Candidate	Votes	%	±%
INC	Vishvendra Singh	73,730	45.41	
BJP	Dr. Shailesh Singh	65,512	40.35	
BSP	Pratap Singh Sinsinwar Maharawar	20,026	12.33	
NOTA	None of the above	1,081	0.67	
Majority		8,218	5.06	
Turnout		162,375	68.68	
INC hold		Swing		

=== 2013 ===
2013 Rajasthan Legislative Assembly election: Deeg-Kumher
Party	Candidate	Votes	%	±%
INC	Vishvendra Singh	71,407	47.99	
BJP	Dr. Digamber Singh	60245	40.49	
BSP	Rajjan Singh	12086	8.12	
None of the above	Nota	1372	0.92	
LKD	Balmukand	1214	0.82	
Independent	Narendra Singh	791	0.53	
Independent	Dinesh chand	496	0.33	
Independent	Mukita	384	0.26	
Independent	Om Prakash	231	0.16	
Bahujan Suraksha Dal	Manoj kumar	226	0.15	
Independent	Anil kumar singh	131	0.09	
Bharatiya Yuva Shakti	Vikram singh	120	0.08	
Jai Bharat Samanta Party	Rakesh kumar	96	0.07	
Majority		11162	7.57	
Turnout		148800	73.05	
INC hold		Swing		

=== 2008 ===
2008 Rajasthan Legislative Assembly election: Deeg-Kumher
Party	Candidate	Votes	%	±%
BJP	Dr. Digamber Singh	52,669	43.98	
INC	Vishvendra singh	49145	41.05	
BSP	Amar singh	14899	12.44	
Bharatiya Bahujan Party	Net ram	823	0.69	
Independent	Banwari lal	803	0.67	
Independent	Narendra singh surajmal	446	0.37	
Independent	Narendra singh Jawahar singh	303	0.25	
Independent	Digamber	219	0.18	
Bharatiya Jan Shakt	Bishambar Dayal	180	0.15	
Lok Jan Shakti Party	Lajjaram	140	0.12	
Rajasthan Vikas Party	Shivcharan	135	0.11	
Majority		3524	2.94	
Turnout		119762	67.0	
BJP win (new seat)				

== See also ==
- List of constituencies of the Rajasthan Legislative Assembly
- Bharatpur district
