= Vijay Bansal =

Indian politician

Member of the Rajasthan Legislative Assembly
- In office 2003–2018
- Constituency: Bharatpur
- Succeeded by: Subhash Garg

Personal details
- Party: Bharatiya Janata Party
- Occupation: Politician

Vijay Bansal is an Indian politician from the Bharatiya Janata Party and a member of the Rajasthan Legislative Assembly representing the Bharatpur Vidhan Sabha constituency of Rajasthan.
