= Mangal Ram Koli =

Indian politician

- मंगल राम कोली

State minister in Government of Rajasthan
- In office 1993–1998
- Preceded by: Babulal
- Succeeded by: Babulal

Personal details
- Born: Mangal Ram Koli; 10 August 1962 (age 63) Harshana, Lakshmangarh, Alwar district, Rajasthan, India, Asia
- Citizenship: India
- Party: Bharatiya Janata Party
- Spouse: Smt. Brahma Devi Koli
- Parents: Kishan Lal Koli (father); Bhagwati Devi Koli (mother)
- Occupation: Politician
- Profession: Teacher

Mangal Ram Koli is an Indian politician, social worker and former minister in Government of Rajasthan and former Member of the Legislative Assembly for Kathumar assembly constituency as a member of the Bharatiya Janata Party.

== Early life ==
Mangal Ram Koli was born to Devi Lal Koli and Bhagwati Devi Koli in Harshana village of Lakshmangarh tehsil of Alwar district in Rajasthan state of India on 10 August 1962.

== Political career ==
- 1991 - ongoing, General Secretary of Alwar district Koli society
- 1993 - 1998, Member of Legislative Assembly for Kathumar Assembly constituency
- 1993 - 1998, Minister of State (Independent charge) in Government of Rajasthan for the ministries of Tenure, Urban Development Department, Self-governance unit, State Insurance and Provident Fund Department and revenue Department
- 2013 - 2018, 2nd term MLA for Kathumar Assembly constituency
- 2014 - 2018, Member of Committee on Welfare of Minorities, Rajasthan Legislative Assembly
- 2016 - 2018, Member of Home Committee, Rajasthan Legislative Assembly
