= Krishnendra Kaur (Deepa) =

Indian politician

Krishnendra Kaur (Deepa) is a former member of the lower house of India's parliament (Lok Sabha). She was elected to Lok Sabha from Bharatpur in Rajasthan as candidate of Bharatiya Janata Party. She is from former royal family of Bharatpur. She was born in 1954 and had her education at Maharani Gayatri Devi Girls’ Public School, Jaipur. She has been a member of Rajasthan Legislative Assembly from Nadbai. She is daughter of Raja Man Singh (politician).

Elected to Rajasthan Legislative assembly in 2008.
