= 2004 Indian general election in Rajasthan =

== Results ==
Constituency		Winner				Runner-up				Margin	
Constituency		Candidate	Party	Votes	%	Candidate	Party	Votes	%	Votes	%
1	Ganganagar (SC)	Nihalchand Meghwal	BJP	331,475	45.85	Bharatram	INC	324,082	44.83	7,393	1.02
2	Bikaner	Dharmendra	BJP	517,802	48.06	Rameshwar Lal	INC	460,627	42.76	57,175	5.31
3	Churu	Ramsingh Kaswan	BJP	400,718	48.05	Bal Ram Jakhar	INC	370,864	44.47	29,854	3.58
4	Jhunjhunu	Shish Ram Ola	INC	274,168	40.23	Santosh Ahlawat	BJP	250,813	36.80	23,355	3.43
5	Sikar	Subhash Meharia	BJP	367,546	47.15	Narayan Singh	INC	312,863	40.14	54,683	7.02
6	Jaipur	Girdhari Lal Bhargava	BJP	480,730	54.56	Pratap Singh Khachariawas	INC	373,544	42.40	107,186	12.17
7	Dausa	Sachin Pilot	INC	369,935	51.60	Kartar Singh Bhadana	BJP	255,070	35.58	114,865	16.02
8	Alwar	Dr. Karan Singh Yadav	INC	246,833	45.47	Mahant Chandnath	BJP	238,462	43.93	8,371	1.54
9	Bharatpur	Vishvendra Singh	BJP	319,904	55.44	Ved Prakash	INC	208,555	36.15	111,349	19.30
10	Bayana (SC)	Ramswaroop Koli	BJP	265,051	54.02	Mahendra Singh	INC	205,427	41.87	59,624	12.15
11	Sawai Madhopur (ST)	Namo Narain	INC	367,553	55.22	Jaskaur	BJP	256,390	38.52	111,163	16.70
12	Ajmer	Rasa Singh Rawat	BJP	314,788	59.44	Haji Habiburrehaman	INC	186,812	35.28	127,976	24.17
13	Tonk (SC)	Kailash Meghwal	BJP	315,717	53.12	Nand Kishore Bairwa	INC	257,205	43.27	58,512	9.84
14	Kota	Raghuveer Singh Koshal	BJP	298,314	51.42	Hari Mohan Sharma	INC	226,536	39.05	71,778	12.37
15	Jhalawar	Dushyant Singh	BJP	303,845	53.53	Sanjay Gurjar	INC	222,266	39.16	81,579	14.37
16	Banswara (ST)	Dhan Singh Rawat	BJP	269,239	40.42	Prabhulal Rawat	INC	247,556	37.17	21,683	3.26
17	Salumber (ST)	Mahaveer Bhagora	BJP	281,659	44.72	Bherulal Meena	INC	256,885	40.79	24,774	3.93
18	Udaipur	Kiran Maheshwari	BJP	398,059	52.40	Girija Vyas	INC	323,184	42.54	74,875	9.86
19	Chittorgarh	Shrichand Kriplani	BJP	375,385	55.82	Vishwa Vijay Singh	INC	239,615	35.63	135,770	20.19
20	Bhilwara	Vijayendrapal Singh	BJP	317,292	51.20	Kailash Vyas	INC	256,640	41.41	60,652	9.79
21	Pali	Pusp Jain	BJP	264,114	48.66	Surendra Kumar Surana	INC	200,876	37.01	63,238	11.65
22	Jalore (SC)	B. Susheela	BJP	321,255	48.98	Buta Singh	INC	282,063	43.01	39,192	5.98
23	Barmer	Manvendra Singh	BJP	631,851	60.25	Col. Sona Ram Choudhary	INC	359,963	34.32	271,888	25.93
24	Jodhpur	Jaswant Singh Bishnoi	BJP	434,352	50.22	Badri Ram Jakhar	INC	391,857	45.31	42,495	4.91
25	Nagaur	Bhanwar Singh Dangawas	BJP	284,657	45.08	Ramraghunath	INC	214,030	33.89	70,627	11.18

== Partywise poll results ==
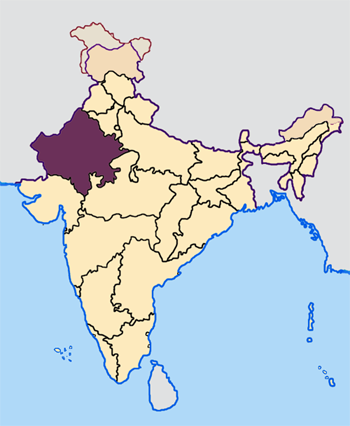
Rajasthan

=== Results by Party ===
Party Name	Popular vote			Seats		
Party Name	Votes	%	±pp	Contested	Won	+/−
BJP	84,94,488	49.01		25	21	
INC	71,79,939	41.42		25	4	
BSP	5,48,297	3.16		24	0	
LJP	1,11,696	0.64		1	0	
INLD	90,320	0.52		5	0	
CPI(M)	89,042	0.51		2	0	
JD(U)	78,556	0.45		1	0	
CPI	64,347	0.37		2	0	
SP	51,505	0.30		10	0	
NCP	35,802	0.21		2	0	
CPI(M-L)L	28,839	0.17		2	0	
Others	88,328	0.51	Steady	17	0	Steady
IND	4,71,289	2.72		69	0	Steady
Total	1,73,32,448	100%	-	185	25	-

== Post-election Union Council of Ministers from Rajasthan ==
#	Name	Constituency	Designation	Department	From	To	Party
1	Sis Ram Ola	Jhunjhunu	Cabinet Minister	Labour and Employment	23 May 2004	27 Nov 2004	INC
1	Sis Ram Ola	Jhunjhunu	Cabinet Minister	Mines	27 Nov 2004	22 May 2009	INC
2	Namo Narain Meena	Sawai Madhopur (ST)	MoS	Environment and Forests	23 May 2004	22 May 2009	INC

== Results by constituencies ==
=== Ganganagar ===
General Election, 2004: Ganganagar
Party	Candidate	Votes	%	±%
BJP	Nihalchand Meghwal	331,475	45.85	−7.99
INC	Bharat Ram	324,082	44.83	+5.40
BSP	Munshi Ram	25,144	3.48	+0.99
CPI(M)	Comred Shyopatram	22,801	3.15	+0.23
Independent	Teetar Singh	8,047	1.11	
Lokpriya Samaj Party	Babu Lal	5,327	0.74	+0.07
Independent	Teeku Ram	3,702	0.51	
RJVP	Hetram	2,360	0.33	+0.27
Majority		7,393	1.02	−13.39
Turnout		722,938	54.07	+1.27
BJP hold		Swing	-7.99	

=== Bikaner ===
General Election, 2004: Bikaner
Party	Candidate	Votes	%	±%
BJP	Dharmendra	517,802	48.06	−4.69
INC	Rameshwar Lal Dudi	460,627	42.76	+0.11
BSP	Arjan Ram	38,729	3.59	+1.02
Independent	Surendra Kumar Gandhi	13,281	1.23	
Independent	Shyam Sunder	11,540	1.07	
INLD	Dilip Singh Marwal	10,664	0.99	
Independent	Saroj	7,786	0.72	
Independent	Dr. Mohan Lal Sharma	5,196	0.48	
Independent	Ram Lal	3,848	0.36	
Lokpriya Samaj Party	Mahavir Prasad	2,818	0.26	
SP	Rajendra Singh	1,998	0.19	
Independent	Brij Gopal	1,762	0.16	
Independent	Jasvindra Singh	1,313	0.12	
Majority		57,175	5.30	−4.80
Turnout		1,077,364	56.75	+3.04
BJP hold		Swing	-4.69	

=== Churu ===
General Election, 2004: Churu
Party	Candidate	Votes	%	±%
BJP	Ram Singh Kaswan	400,718	48.05	−3.61
INC	Balram Jakhar	370,864	44.47	−0.31
BSP	Daulataram Painsiya	30,142	3.61	+2.11
INLD	Damodar Mishra	10,132	1.21	
Independent	Sufi Sultan	8,594	1.03	
Independent	Sabir Khan	5,146	0.62	
Independent	Ranjeet Rai	3,773	0.45	
Independent	Chimna Ram	2,499	0.30	
Independent	Mohd. Iliyas Khichi	2,108	0.25	
Majority		29,854	3.58	−3.30
Turnout		833,976	60.84	+5.52
BJP hold		Swing	-3.61	

=== Jhunjhunu ===
General Election, 2004: Jhunjhunu
Party	Candidate	Votes	%	±%
INC	Sis Ram Ola	274,168	40.23	−9.13
BJP	Santosh Ahlawat	250,813	36.80	−1.15
LJP	Ranveer Singh Gudha	111,696	16.39	
BSP	Ayub Khan	23,037	3.38	
CPI(ML)L	Mahendra Choudhary	6,810	1.00	+0.80
Independent	Mahada Ram Soni	5,488	0.81	
SP	Rohitash	3,863	0.57	−0.32
ABHM	Vijay	2,970	0.44	−0.11
Independent	Basant Lal Saini	2,660	0.39	
Majority		23,355	3.43	−7.98
Turnout		681,505	49.80	−7.20
INC hold		Swing	-9.13	

=== Sikar ===
2004 Indian general elections: Sikar
Party	Candidate	Votes	%	±%
BJP	Subhash Maharia	367,546	47.15	▲1.59
INC	Narayan Singh	3,12,863	40.14	▼1.66
CPI(M)	Amra Ram	66,241	8.50	▼2.24
BSP	Ramesh Chandra Sharma	8,072	1.04	▲0.55
Majority		54,683	7.01	▲3.25
Turnout		7,79,471	52.84	▲5.69
BJP hold		Swing	▲1.59	

=== Jaipur ===
General Election, 2004: Jaipur
Party	Candidate	Votes	%	±%
BJP	Girdhari Lal Bhargava	480,730	54.56	−1.94
INC	Pratap Singh Khachariawas	373,544	42.4	+3.04
Independent	Vijay Rathi	8,885	1.01	
BSP	O P Barwadia	7,310	0.83	
Independent	Monu Kuruvila	3,414	0.39	
Independent	Bhag Chand Jain	1,491	0.17	
RLD	Mahendra Pratap Singh	1,371	0.16	
SP	Indrajeet Singh	1,251	0.14	−0.12
Independent	Avinash Rai	877	0.10	
Independent	Prabhu Devi Soyal	807	0.09	
Independent	Iftkhar	732	0.08	
SAP	Om Prakash Kedawat	663	0.07	
Majority		107,186	12.16	−5.38
Turnout		881,075	46.45	+0.34
BJP hold		Swing	-1.94	

=== Dausa ===
General Election, 2004: Dausa
Party	Candidate	Votes	%	±%
INC	Sachin Pilot	369,935	51.60	+1.65
BJP	Kartar Singh Bhadana	255,070	35.58	−3.38
INLD	Rohitash Kumar Sharma	46,938	6.55	
BSP	Rakesh Meena	15,437	2.15	
Independent	Subhash Chandra Sharma	12,004	1.67	
RJVP	Dhanna Ram	7,672	1.07	
Independent	Rohitash Kuldeep	3,924	0.55	
Independent	Ramesh	3,047	0.43	
SP	Mukarram Ali	2,874	0.40	−0.13
Majority		114,865	16.02	+15.09
Turnout		716,901	49.04	−10.58
INC hold		Swing	+1.65	

=== Alwar ===
General Election, 2004: Alwar
Party	Candidate	Votes	%	±%
INC	Dr. Karan Singh Yadav	246,833	45.47	+1.94
BJP	Mahant Chandnath	238,462	43.93	−9.02
BSP	Bhai Shree Nath Gurjar	21,247	3.91	+1.48
Independent	R D Sharma	16,627	3.06	
INLD	Chandrabhan	5,833	1.07	
Independent	Subhash	5,190	0.96	
Independent	Sagar Mal	3,643	0.67	
SP	Manjul Kaushik	1,643	0.30	+0.04
Independent	Lakshman Saini	1,058	0.19	
SMSP	Baksha Nand Bharati	985	0.18	
Independent	Ramesh Chand	730	0.13	
Independent	Mool Chand	625	0.12	+0.06
Majority		8,371	1.54	+10.96
Turnout		542,876	43.07	−10.51
INC gain from BJP		Swing	+1.94	

=== Bharatpur ===
General Election, 2004: Bharatpur
Party	Candidate	Votes	%	±%
BJP	Vishvendra Singh	319,904	55.44	+7.07
INC	Ved Prakash	208,555	36.15	+4.70
BSP	Mandleshwar Singh	38,723	6.71	−7.52
SP	Khursheed Ahmad	3,963	0.69	−2.61
Independent	Dr. Samundra Singh	3,117	0.54	
Independent	Shiv Kumar Singh	1,495	0.26	+0.23
Independent	Jaikam Deen	1,230	0.21	
Majority		111,349	19.29	+2.37
Turnout		576,987	48.54	−5.91
BJP hold		Swing	+7.07	

=== Bayana ===
General Election, 2004: Bayana
Party	Candidate	Votes	%	±%
BJP	Ramswaroop Koli	265,051	54.02	−1.94
INC	Mahendra Singh	205,427	41.87	+3.04
BSP	Shakuntala Padam Singh	11,642	2.37	
Independent	Lakkheeram	3,226	0.66	
Independent	Mool Chand KOli	1,790	3.61	
SP	Mahant Ajay Balmiki	1,555	3.17	+2.92
RLD	Lakan Singh Mourya	1,313	2.68	
Independent	Janki Devi Koli	623	1.27	
Majority		59,624	12.15	+5.88
Turnout		490,633	46.45	+5.43
BJP hold		Swing	-1.94	

=== Sawai Madhopur ===
General Election, 2004: Sawai Madhopur
Party	Candidate	Votes	%	±%
INC	Namo Narain Meena	367,553	55.22	+12.58
BJP	Jaskaur Meena	256,390	38.52	−15.64
BSP	Kailash	27,332	4.11	+2.01
SJP(R)	Hari Prasad	7,235	1.09	
JP	Geeta	7,084	1.06	
Majority		111,163	16.70	+28.18
Turnout		665,594	49.67	+5.88
INC gain from BJP		Swing	+12.58	

=== Ajmer ===
General Election, 2004: Ajmer
Party	Candidate	Votes	%	±%
BJP	Rasa Singh Rawat	314,788	54.44	−1.52
INC	Haji Habibur Rehman	186,812	35.28	−5.91
BSP	Paras Chatar Jain	11,224	2.12	
Independent	Rekhraj Fauji	6,325	1.19	
SP	K P Singh	5,431	1.03	+0.26
Independent	Ram Pal Koli	2,610	0.49	
Independent	Swami Krishanand Maharaj	2,359	0.45	
Majority		127,976	19.16	−5.38
Turnout		529,549	44.08	−9.62
BJP hold		Swing	-1.52	

=== Tonk ===
General Election, 2004: Tonk
Party	Candidate	Votes	%	±%
BJP	Kailash Meghwal	315,717	53.12	−0.13
INC	Nand Kishore Bairwa	257,205	43.27	−1.02
BSP	Ram Babu Raiger	21,436	3.61	+2.51
Majority		58,512	9.85	−0.11
Turnout		594,358	46.52	−1.48
BJP hold		Swing	-0.13	

=== Kota ===
General Election, 2004: Kota
Party	Candidate	Votes	%	±%
BJP	Raghuveer Singh Koshal	298,314	51.42	+0.51
INC	Hari Mohan Sharma	226,536	39.05	−7.92
SP	Kundan Cheeta	18,237	3.14	+2.87
BSP	Motilal Meena	15,156	2.61	
Independent	Samudra Singh Hada	10,308	1.78	
Independent	Badam Berwa	4,703	0.81	
Independent	Daulat Kunwar Sharma	4,050	0.70	
Akhil Bharatiya Rashtriya Azad Hind Party	Bhanwar Singh	2,801	0.48	
Majority		71,778	12.37	+8.43
Turnout		580,105	43.75	+8.44
BJP hold		Swing	+0.51	

=== Jhalawar ===
General Election, 2004: Jhalawar
Party	Candidate	Votes	%	±%
BJP	Dushyant Singh	303,845	53.53	−6.90
INC	Sanjay Gurjar	222,266	39.16	+1.22
Independent	Jakir Husen	25,164	4.43	
BSP	Ratan Lal	16,336	2.88	
Majority		81,579	14.37	−8.12
Turnout		567,611	47.81	−16.53
BJP hold		Swing	-6.90	

=== Banswara ===
General Election, 2004: Banswara
Party	Candidate	Votes	%	±%
BJP	Dhan Singh Rawat	269,239	40.42	+40.42
INC	Prabhu Lal Rawat	247,556	37.17	−21.87
JD	Jeetmal Khant	78,556	11.79	−29.17
Independent	Suryalal Khant	31,132	4.67	+4.67
BSP	Sunder Lal Parmar	17,841	2.70	
Independent	Nanuram Khant	11,084	1.66	
SP	Bahadur Singh	10,688	1.60	
Majority		21,683	3.25	+62.29
Turnout		666,098	48.51	−7.11
BJP gain from INC		Swing	+40.42	

=== Salumber ===
General Election, 2004: Salumber
Party	Candidate	Votes	%	±%
BJP	Mahaveer Bhagora	281,659	44.72	+2.30
INC	Bheru Lal Meena	256,885	40.79	−10.94
CPI	Meghraj Tawar	32,233	5.12	+1.13
NCP	Kika Bhai Meena	25,351	4.03	
CPI(ML)L	Puran Mal	22,029	3.50	+3.22
BSP	Hari Om Meena	11,677	1.85	+0.81
Majority		24,774	3.93	+12.24
Turnout		629,834	49.26	−2.39
BJP gain from INC		Swing	+2.30	

=== Udaipur ===
General Election, 2004: Udaipur
Party	Candidate	Votes	%	±%
BJP	Kiran Maheshwari	398,059	52.40	+6.90
INC	Girija Vyas	323,184	42.54	−10.69
BSP	Sunita Singh Gujar	15,890	2.09	+1.21
Independent	Sukhdeo Menaria	15,582	2.05	
Akhil Bharatiya Congress Dal (Ambedkar)	Lahari Lal Bairwa	6,983	0.92	
Majority		74,865	9.86	+17.59
Turnout		759,698	55.75	−0.72
BJP gain from INC		Swing	+6.90	

=== Chittorgarh ===
General Election, 2004: Chittorgarh
Party	Candidate	Votes	%	±%
BJP	Shrichand Kriplani	375,385	55.82	+4.98
INC	Vishwa Vijay Singh	239,615	35.63	−10.59
CPI	Radha Devi	32,114	4.78	+2.49
BSP	S S Stone	12,798	1.90	
Akhil Bharatiya Congress Dal (Ambedkar)	Chand Mal Meghwal	12,565	1.87	
Majority		135,770	20.19	+15.67
Turnout		672,447	48.54	−17.17
BJP hold		Swing	+4.98	

=== Bhilwara ===
General Election, 2004: Bhilwara
Party	Candidate	Votes	%	±%
BJP	Vijayendrapal Singh	317,292	51.20	+3.24
INC	Kailash Vyas	256,640	41.41	−4.18
Independent	Mubariq	24,896	4.02	
BSP	Ramgopal Jonwal	20,868	3.38	+3.03
Majority		60,652	9.79	+7.42
Turnout		619,696	50.32	−3.13
BJP hold		Swing	+3.24	

=== Pali ===
General Election, 2004: Pali
Party	Candidate	Votes	%	±%
BJP	Pusp Jain	264,114	48.66	−10.80
INC	Surendra Kumar Surana	200,876	37.01	−2.81
Independent	Madhav Singh Diwan	38,664	7.12	
Independent	Heera Ram	10,784	1.99	
NCP	Meethalal Jain	10,451	1.93	
BSP	Sohan Singh Sankhala	6,368	1.17	+0.63
Independent	Moola Ram	5,969	1.10	
Independent	Lahara Ram Sargara	2,901	0.53	
Independent	Barkat Ali	2,611	0.48	
Majority		63,238	11.65	−7.99
Turnout		542,738	45.46	−4.54
BJP hold		Swing	-10.80	

=== Jalore ===
General Election, 2004: Jalore
Party	Candidate	Votes	%	±%
BJP	B. Susheela	321,255	48.98	+3.18
INC	Sardar Buta Singh	282,063	43.01	−8.37
Independent	Jasa Ram	28,061	4.28	
BSP	Dinesh Katiwal	24,489	3.73	+3.23
Majority		39,192	5.97	+0.39
Turnout		655,868	45.92	−6.62
BJP gain from INC		Swing	+3.18	

=== Barmer ===
General Election, 2004: Barmer
Party	Candidate	Votes	%	±%
BJP	Manvendra Singh	631,851	60.25	+13.01
INC	Sona Ram	359,963	34.32	−16.79
Independent	Arjun Ram	20,945	2.00	
BSP	Sharvan Kumar	19,636	1.87	+1.34
INLD	Hastimal Doshi	16,753	1.60	
Majority		271,888	25.93	+29.80
Turnout		1,048,698	63.99	+4.67
BJP gain from INC		Swing	+13.01	

=== Jodhpur ===
General Election, 2004: Jodhpur
Party	Candidate	Votes	%	±%
BJP	Jaswant Singh Bishnoi	434,352	50.22	−5.95
INC	Badri Ram Jakhar	391,857	45.31	−6.43
Independent	Sabir Gauri	10,363	1.20	
JP	Ravi Garg	8,974	1.04	
Independent	Shaitan Singh Chouhan	4,682	0.54	
Independent	Devilal Bheel	3,827	0.44	
Independent	Mahmuda Begum Abbasi	3,118	0.36	−1.61
Independent	Vijay Krishna Sharma	2,684	0.31	
Independent	Dungari Lal Meghwal	1,658	0.19	
Independent	Leela Devi	1,592	0.18	
Independent	Badri Ram	970	0.11	
Independent	Pukhraj Meghwal	850	0.10	
Majority		42,495	4.91	−12.41
Turnout		864,927	55.04	+7.76
BJP hold		Swing	-5.95	

=== Nagaur ===
General Election, 2004: Nagaur
Party	Candidate	Votes	%	±%
BJP	Bhanwar Singh Dangawas	284,657	45.08	+13.94
INC	Ram Raghunath Choudhary	214,030	33.89	−4.13
BSP	Mool Chand	107,757	17.06	−12.43
Independent	Bhanwar Singh Rathore	9,888	1.57	
NLP	Nawab Khan	7,677	1.22	
Independent	Kailash	3,842	0.61	
Independent	Bhanu Prakash	3,620	0.57	
Majority		70,627	11.19	+4.31
Turnout		631,471	44.02	−13.64
BJP gain from INC		Swing	+13.94	
