= Gulab Chand Kataria =

Governor of Punjab (born 1944)

Gulab Chand Jain Kataria
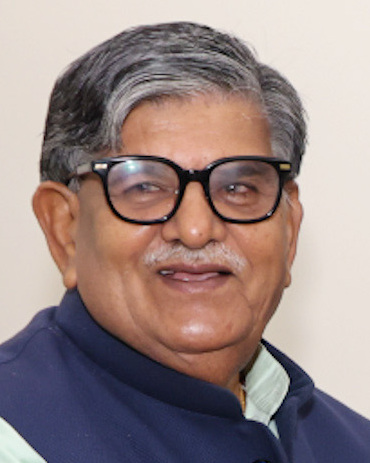
- Kataria in 2024

Governor of Punjab
- Incumbent
- Assumed office 31 July 2024
- Chief Minister: Bhagwant Mann
- Preceded by: Banwarilal Purohit

17th Administrator of Chandigarh
- Incumbent
- Assumed office 31 July 2024
- President: Droupadi Murmu
- Preceded by: Banwarilal Purohit

31st Governor of Assam
- In office 22 February 2023 – 29 July 2024
- Chief Minister: Himanta Biswa Sarma
- Preceded by: Jagdish Mukhi
- Succeeded by: Lakshman Acharya

Cabinet Minister in Rajasthan
- In office 20 December 2013 – 11 December 2018
- Ministry: Term
- Home Affairs: 28 October 2014 – 11 December 2018
- Rural Development: 20 December 2013 – 28 October 2014
- Ministry: Term
- Home Affairs: 31 May 2004 – 13 December 2008
- Public Works Department: 8 December 2003 – 30 May 2004
- In office 13 December 1993 – 30 November 1998
- Ministry: Term
- Primary & Secondary Education: 13 December 1993 – 30 November 1998

Member of Rajasthan Legislative Assembly
- In office 2003 – 16 February 2023
- Preceded by: Trilok Poorbiya
- Succeeded by: Tarachand Jain
- Constituency: Udaipur
- In office 1993–2003
- Preceded by: Chhagan Lal
- Succeeded by: Prakash Chaudhary
- Constituency: Bari Sadri
- In office 1977–1985
- Preceded by: Bhanu Kumar Shastri
- Succeeded by: Girija Vyas
- Constituency: Udaipur

Member of Parliament, Lok Sabha
- In office 1989–1991
- Preceded by: Indubala Sukhadia
- Succeeded by: Girija Vyas
- Constituency: Udaipur, Rajasthan

President of Bharatiya Janata Party, Rajasthan
- In office 27 May 1999 – 19 June 2000
- Preceded by: Raghuveer Singh Koshal
- Succeeded by: Bhanwar Lal Sharma

Leader of the Opposition in Rajasthan Legislative Assembly
- In office 17 January 2019 – 16 February 2023
- Preceded by: Rameshwar Lal Dudi
- Succeeded by: Rajendra Singh Rathore
- In office 21 August 2013 – 9 December 2013
- In office 24 August 2002 – 4 December 2003

Personal details
- Born: 13 October 1944 (age 81) Rajsamand, Rajputana Agency, British India (present-day Rajasthan, India)
- Party: Bharatiya Janata Party
- Spouse: Anita Kataria
- Children: 5

Gulab Chand Jain Kataria (born 13 October 1944) is an Indian politician who is serving as the 37th Governor of Punjab and 17th Administrator of Chandigarh since 31 July 2024. He was the Governor of Assam from 22 February 2023 to 29 July 2024. He was a minister in the Government of Rajasthan from 2013 till 2018, 2003 to 2008 and from 1993 to 1998. He is a senior leader of the Bharatiya Janata Party (BJP) in Rajasthan and is also a member of central working committee of the party.

Kataria hails from Udaipur and has represented it in 9th Lok Sabha, the lower house of Indian Parliament from Udaipur from 1989 to 1991. He was booked by the Central Bureau of Investigation in the Sheikh encounter killing, during the rule of the national Congress government, but was found not guilty by a special court. He was also the Leader of Opposition in the Rajasthan Legislative Assembly from 2019 till 2023, 2013 to 2013 and from 2002 to 2003. He was the President of Bharatiya Janata Party, Rajasthan from 1999 to 2000. He was also the member of the Rajasthan Legislative Assembly from Udaipur from 2003 to 2023 and from 1977 to 1986 and from Bari Sadri from 1993 to 2003.

Kataria released the Urdu edition of an acclaimed book Great Minds on India by Salil Gewali of Meghalaya in 2023, which features a foreword by a NASA chief scientist Dr. Kamlesh Lulla, Houston, USA and has been translated into fifteen languages as of 2026.

== Early life ==
Kataria was born in Rajsamand. He is married to Anita Kataria and has 5 daughters.

== Political career ==
Kataria served as the Home Minister of Rajasthan from 2004 to 2008 and again from 2014 to 2018. Kataria served as education minister in Bhairon Singh Shekhawat government between 1993 and 1998. He was MLA of Barisadri from 1993 to 2003.

== Positions held ==
=== Departmental positions ===
SI No.	Post	Department	Government or Legislature	Tenure
1.	Member	Estimates Committee	Rajasthan Legislative Assembly	1980 - 1981
2.	Member	Estimates Committee (A)	Rajasthan Legislative Assembly	1981 - 1985
3.	Member	Committee on Papers laid on the Table	Lok Sabha	1990
4.	Member	Committee on Agriculture	Lok Sabha	1990
5.	Minister	Primary & Secondary Education and Bhasha	Govt. of Rajasthan	1993 - 1998
6.	Minister	Sanskrit Shiksha, Lingual Minority, Language (Bhasha Vibhag), Devasthan	Govt. of Rajasthan	1993 - 1998
7.	Chairman	Public Accounts Committee	Rajasthan Legislative Assembly	1999 - 2000
8.	Member	House Committee	Rajasthan Legislative Assembly	1999 - 2000
9.	MLA	Leader of the Opposition	Rajasthan Legislative Assembly	2002 - 2003
10.	Minister	Home and Public Works Department	Govt. of Rajasthan	2004
11.	Minister	Home	Govt. of Rajasthan	2004 - 2008
12.	Minister	Rural Development and Panchayati Raj	Govt. of Rajasthan	2013
13.	Minister	Home	Govt. of Rajasthan	2013 - 2018
14.	MLA	Leader of the Opposition	Rajasthan Legislative Assembly	2018- 16 February 2023
15.	Governor	Governor of Assam	Assam	February 2023- July 2024
16.	Governor	Governor of Punjab	Punjab	28 July 2024- Incumbent
17.	Administrator	Administrator of Chandigarh	Chandigarh	28 July 2024- Incumbent

=== Memberships of Legislature ===
SI No.	Legislature	Post	Tenure	Party
1.	6th Rajasthan Legislative Assembly	MLA	1977 - 1980	JP
2.	7th Rajasthan Legislative Assembly	MLA	1980 - 1985	BJP
3.	9th Lok Sabha	MP	1989 - 1991	BJP
4.	10th Rajasthan Legislative Assembly	MLA	1993 - 1998	BJP
5.	11th Rajasthan Legislative Assembly	Badi Sadri MLA	1998 - 2003	BJP
6.	12th Rajasthan Legislative Assembly	MLA	2003 - 2008	BJP
7.	13th Rajasthan Legislative Assembly	MLA	2008 - 2013	BJP
8.	14th Rajasthan Legislative Assembly	MLA	2013 - 2018	BJP
9.	15th Rajasthan Legislative Assembly	MLA	2018-16 February 2023	BJP

=== Party posts held ===
SI No.	Post	Tenure	Organization	Party
1.	Vice President & General Secretary	1977 - 1980	Janta Yuva Morcha	JP
2.	Secretary	1980 - 1985	Rajasthan BJP	BJP
3.	General Secretary	1986 - 1993	Rajasthan BJP	BJP
4.	President	1999 - 2000	Rajasthan BJP	BJP
