= Udaipur Lok Sabha constituency =

Lok Sabha Constituency in Rajasthan

Coordinates: 24.6°N 73.7°E

Udaipur
- Lok Sabha constituency
- Interactive Map Outlining Udaipur Lok Sabha Constituency

Constituency details
- Country: India
- Region: North India
- State: Rajasthan
- Assembly constituencies: Gogunda; Jhadol; Kherwara; Udaipur Rural; Udaipur; Salumber; Dhariawad; Aspur
- Established: 1952
- Reservation: ST

Member of Parliament
- 18th Lok Sabha
- Incumbent Manna Lal Rawat
- Party: Bharatiya Janata Party
- Elected year: 2024

Udaipur Lok Sabha constituency (Hindi pronunciation: [ʊd̪əj.pʊɾ]) one of the 25 Lok Sabha (parliamentary) constituencies in the Rajasthan state in India.

== Assembly segments ==
Presently, Udaipur Lok Sabha constituency comprises eight Vidhan Sabha (legislative assembly) segments. These are:

#	Name	District	Member	Party	2024 Lead
149	Gogunda (ST)	Udaipur	Pratap Lal Bheel	BJP	BJP
150	Jhadol (ST)	Udaipur	Babulal Kharadi	BJP	BJP
151	Kherwara (ST)	Udaipur	Dayaram Parmar	INC	INC
152	Udaipur Rural (ST)	Udaipur	Phool Singh Meena	BJP	BJP
153	Udaipur	Udaipur	Tarachand Jain	BJP	BJP
156	Salumber (ST)	Udaipur	Shanta Amrit Lal Meena	BJP	BJP
157	Dhariawad (ST)	Pratapgarh	Thavar Chand	BAP	BJP
159	Aspur (ST)	Dungarpur	Umesh Meena	BAP	BAP

== Members of Parliament ==
Year	Member	Party
1952	Balwant Singh Mehta	Indian National Congress
1957	Deenbandhu Parmar	Indian National Congress
1962	Dhuleshwar Meena	Indian National Congress
1967	Dhuleshwar Meena	Indian National Congress
1971	Laljibhai Meena	Bharatiya Jana Sangh
1977	Bhanu Kumar Shastri	Bharatiya Lok Dal
1980	Mohan Lal Sukhadia	Indian National Congress
1984	Indubala Sukhadia	Indian National Congress
1989	Gulab Chand Kataria	Bharatiya Janata Party
1991	Girija Vyas	Indian National Congress
1996	Girija Vyas	Indian National Congress
1998	Shanti Lal Chaplot	Bharatiya Janata Party
1999	Girija Vyas	Indian National Congress
2004	Kiran Maheshwari	Bharatiya Janata Party
2009	Raghuveer Meena	Indian National Congress
2014	Arjunlal Meena	Bharatiya Janata Party
2019	Arjunlal Meena	Bharatiya Janata Party
2024	Manna Lal Rawat	Bharatiya Janata Party

== Election results ==
=== 2024 ===
2024 Indian general election: Udaipur
Party	Candidate	Votes	%	±%
BJP	Manna Lal Rawat	7,38,286	49.27	▼9.65
INC	Tarachand Meena	4,76,678	31.81	▲2
BAP	Prakash Chand	2,17,138	14.49	new
BSP	Dalpat Ram Garasia	14,460	0.97	Steady
NOTA	NOTA	22,948	1.53	▼0.41
Majority		2,61,608	17.45	
Turnout		14,98,376	66.66	
BJP hold		Swing		

=== 2019 ===
2019 Indian general elections: Udaipur
Party	Candidate	Votes	%	±%
BJP	Arjunlal Meena	871,548	59.92	
INC	Raghuveer Meena	4,33,631	29.81	
BTP	Birdhi Lal Chhanwal	51,643	3.55	
NOTA	None of the Above	28,179	1.94	
CPI	Khan Shyam Thavad	18,386	1.26	
Margin of victory		4,37,914	30.11	
Turnout		14,55,417	70.32	
BJP hold		Swing		

=== 2014 ===
2014 Indian general elections: Udaipur
Party	Candidate	Votes	%	±%
BJP	Arjunlal Meena	6,60,373	55.34	
INC	Raghuveer Meena	4,23,611	35.50	
CPI(ML)L	Meghraj Tawar	33,743	2.83	
NOTA	None of the above	26,685	2.24	
BSP	Laxman Bhil	20,690	1.73	
BMP	Prabhu Lal Meena	4,529	0.38	
Majority		2,36,762	19.84	
Turnout		11,93,815	65.67	
BJP gain from INC		Swing		

=== General election 2009 ===
2009 Indian general elections: Udaipur
Party	Candidate	Votes	%	±%
INC	Raghuveer Meena	4,11,510	54.26	
BJP	Mahaveer Bhagora	2,46,585	32.51	
CPI	Meghraj Tawar	27,324	3.60	
SP	Shakuntala Dhanka	20,441	2.70	
Majority		1,64,925	21.75	
Turnout		7,58,447	48.49	
INC gain from BJP		Swing		

== See also ==
- Udaipur district
- List of constituencies of the Lok Sabha
