= Arjunlal Meena =

Indian politician

Member of Parliament, Lok Sabha
- In office 2014–2024
- Preceded by: Raghuveer Meena
- Succeeded by: Manna Lal Rawat
- Constituency: Udaipur

Personal details
- Born: 12 August 1964 (age 61) Udaipur, Rajasthan
- Party: Bharatiya Janata Party

Arjunlal Meena (12 August 1964) is a member of the Bharatiya Janata Party and was elected in the 2014 and 2019 Indian general elections from the Udaipur Lok Sabha constituency.
