= Udaipur Assembly constituency =

Constituency of the Rajasthan Legislative Assembly in India

Coordinates: 24.61°N 73.7°E

Udaipur
- Constituency No. 153 for the Rajasthan Legislative Assembly

Constituency details
- Country: India
- Region: North India
- State: Rajasthan
- District: Udaipur
- Lok Sabha constituency: Udaipur
- Established: 1951
- Total electors: 246,410
- Reservation: None

Member of Legislative Assembly
- 16th Rajasthan Legislative Assembly
- Incumbent Tarachand Jain
- Party: Bharatiya Janata Party
- Elected year: 2023

Udaipur Assembly constituency is one of the 200 Legislative Assembly constituencies of Rajasthan state in India. It is in Udaipur district and is a part of Udaipur Lok Sabha Constituency.

== Members of the Legislative Assembly ==
Year	Member	Party
1952	Devi Singh	Ram Rajya Parishad
1957	Mohan Lal Sukhadia	Indian National Congress
1962	Mohan Lal Sukhadia	Indian National Congress
1967	Mohan Lal Sukhadia	Indian National Congress
1972	Bhanu Kumar Shastri	Bharatiya Jana Sangh
1977	Gulab Chand Kataria	Janata Party
1980	Gulab Chand Kataria	Bharatiya Janata Party
1985	Girija Vyas	Indian National Congress
1990	Shiv Kishor Sandhya	Bharatiya Janata Party
1993	Shiv Kishor Sandhya	Bharatiya Janata Party
1998	Trilok Poorbiya	Indian National Congress
2003	Gulab Chand Kataria	Bharatiya Janata Party
2008	Gulab Chand Kataria	Bharatiya Janata Party
2013	Gulab Chand Kataria	Bharatiya Janata Party
2018	Gulab Chand Kataria	Bharatiya Janata Party
2023	Tarachand Jain	Bharatiya Janata Party

== Election results ==
=== 2023 ===
Rajasthan Legislative Assembly Election, 2023: Udaipur
Party	Candidate	Votes	%	±%
BJP	Tarachand Jain	97,466	58.73	+11.67
INC	Gourav Vallabh	64,695	38.98	−2.21
NOTA	None of the above	1,579	0.95	−0.34
Majority		32,771	19.75	+13.88
Turnout		165,949	67.35	+0.34
BJP hold		Swing		

=== 2018 ===
Rajasthan Legislative Assembly Election, 2018: Udaipur
Party	Candidate	Votes	%	±%
BJP	Gulab Chand Kataria	74,808	47.06	
INC	Girija Vyas	65,484	41.19	
Independent	Praveen Ratlia	10,896	6.85	
anta Sena Rajasthan	Dalpat Singh Surana	3,750	2.36	
NOTA	None of the above	2,052	1.29	
Majority		9,324	5.87	
Turnout		158,972	67.01	
BJP hold		Swing		

== See also ==
- List of constituencies of the Rajasthan Legislative Assembly
- Udaipur district
