= Laljibhai Meena =

Indian politician

Member of Parliament, Lok Sabha
- In office 1971–1977
- Preceded by: Dhuleshwar Meena
- Succeeded by: Bhanu Kumar Shastri
- Constituency: Udaipur, Rajasthan
- In office 1977–1980
- Succeeded by: Jai Narain Roat
- Constituency: Salumber, Rajasthan

Personal details
- Born: February 2, 1944 (age 82) Panchagoda Village, Udaipur District, British India
- Party: Janata Party
- Other political affiliations: Bharatiya Jana Sangh
- Spouse: Nathi Bai

Laljibhai Meena is an Indian politician. He was elected to the Lok Sabha, the lower house of the Parliament of India as a member of the Janata Party.
