= Salumber Assembly constituency =

Legislative Assembly constituency in Rajasthan State, India

Coordinates: 24.14°N 74.04°E

Salumber
- Constituency No. 156 for the Rajasthan Legislative Assembly

Constituency details
- Country: India
- Region: North India
- State: Rajasthan
- District: Udaipur
- Lok Sabha constituency: Udaipur
- Established: 1951
- Total electors: 295,173
- Reservation: ST

Member of Legislative Assembly
- 16th Rajasthan Legislative Assembly
- Incumbent Shanta Meena

Salumber Assembly constituency is one of the 200 Legislative Assembly constituencies of Rajasthan state in India.

It is part of Udaipur district, and is reserved for candidates belonging to the Scheduled Tribes. As of 2023, it is represented by Amrit Lal Meena of the Bharatiya Janata Party.

== Members of the Legislative Assembly ==
Year	Name	Party
2008	Raghuveer Meena	Indian National Congress
2013	Amrit Lal Meena	Bharatiya Janata Party
2018	Amrit Lal Meena	Bharatiya Janata Party
2023	Amrit Lal Meena	Bharatiya Janata Party
2024^	Shanta Meena	Bharatiya Janata Party

^2024 by election

== Election results ==
=== 2024 bypoll ===
Rajasthan Legislative Assembly by-election, 2024: Salumber
Party	Candidate	Votes	%	±%
BJP	Shanti Devi Meena	84,428	41.70	
BAP	Jitesh Kumar Katara	83,143	41.06	
INC	Reshma Meena	26,760	13.22	
NOTA	None of the Above	2,560	1.26	
Majority		1,285	0.64	
Turnout				
BJP hold		Swing		

=== 2023 ===
2023 Rajasthan Legislative Assembly election: Salumber
Party	Candidate	Votes	%	±%
BJP	Amritlal Meena	80,086	37.54	−9.94
INC	Raghuvir Singh Meena	65,395	30.66	−4.92
BAP	Jitesh Kumar Meena	51,691	24.23	
Independent	Govind Kalasuya	3,838	1.8	
CPI	Kalu Ram Meena	2,224	1.04	−0.89
NOTA	None of the above	3,702	1.74	−1.28
Majority		14,691	6.88	−5.02
Turnout		213,319	72.27	+2.52
BJP hold		Swing		

=== 2018 ===
Rajasthan Legislative Assembly Election, 2018: Salumber
Party	Candidate	Votes	%	±%
BJP	Amrit Lal Meena	87,472	47.48	
INC	Raguvir Singh	65,554	35.58	
Independent	Reshma Meena	14,329	7.78	
CPI	Govind Kalasuya	3,562	1.93	
All India Hindustan Congress Party	Laluram Bhil	2,891	1.57	
BSP	Soma Lal Meena	2,495	1.35	
NOTA	None of the above	5,561	3.02	
Majority		21,918	11.9	
Turnout		184,219	69.75	

== See also ==
- List of constituencies of the Rajasthan Legislative Assembly
- Udaipur district
