= Meghraj Tawar =

Indian politician

Meghraj Tawar (died on August 27, 2017) was an Indian politician from the Communist Party of India. He represented Gogunda constituency in Rajasthan Legislative Assembly from 1980 to 1985. He is a prominent profile of the party amongst the local Adivasi community.

He died on 27 August 2017 in Rabindranath Tagore Medical College Hospital in Udaipur in age of 76.

== Adivasi struggles ==
Tawar hails from the Bhil community. A prominent Adivasi cadre of the Communist Party, Tawar was detained under the Maintenance of Internal Security Act in the 1970s for having led a campaign against usurers. According to G.S. Rao, "[Tawar] not only organised a terror against the Mahajans and Government officials in Gogunda, but maintained a tribal government in the region for many days. This government could be removed only through police force." As of 2011 he served as a national office bearer of the All India Adivasi Mahasabha.

== Legislator ==
He contested the Gogunda seat in the 1977 Rajasthan Legislative Assembly election, finishing in second place with 8,743 votes (40.62%). He was defeated by Bhura Lal from the Janata Party. Tawar won the Gongunda seat in the 1980 Rajasthan Legislative Assembly election, obtaining 9,530 votes (33.74%).

== Candidate ==
Tawar has contested every election to the Lok Sabha (lower house of the Parliament of India) between 1984 and 2014. He contested the Salumber seat in the general elections of 1984 (37,260 votes, 10.56%), 1989 (21,837 votes, 4.88%), 1991 (16,203 votes, 3.86%), 1996 (24,450 votes, 5.70%), 1998 (42,202 votes, 7.04%), 1999 (22,417 votes, 3.99%) and 2004 (32,233 votes, 5.12%). He finished in third place in all of these elections.

He contested the 1985 Legislative Assembly election from the Phalasia seat, finishing in second place with 4,301 votes (14.55%). Tawar stood as a candidate for the Sarada seat in the 1990 Legislative Assembly election, finishing in third place with 3,915 votes (6.87%). He contested the Sarada seat in the 1993 Legislative Assembly election, finishing in third place with 8,109 votes (12.20%).

In 1998 Tawar contested the Legislative Assembly election from the Gongunda seat, finishing in third place with 2,952 votes (4.17%). Tawar contested the Gongunda seat in the November 2003 Legislative Assembly polls; finishing third with 5,923 votes (6.42%)

After new delimitation of Lok Sabha constituencies, the Communist Party fielded Tawar as its candidate in the Udaipur seat in the 2009 general election. He finished in third place with 27,324 votes (3.60%). He again contested the Gongunda seat in the 2013 Legislative Assembly election, finishing in third place with 6,416 votes.

The Communist Party fielded the 75-year-old Tawar as its candidate in the Udaipur constituency in the 2014 general election. Tawar was the first candidate to file his nomination papers in Udaipur.
