= Rajsamand Assembly constituency =

Constituency of the Rajasthan Legislative Assembly in India

Coordinates: 25.07°N 73.89°E

Rajsamand
- Constituency No. 175 for the Rajasthan Legislative Assembly

Constituency details
- Country: India
- Region: North India
- State: Rajasthan
- District: Rajsamand
- Lok Sabha constituency: Rajsamand
- Established: 1957
- Total electors: 232,184
- Reservation: None

Member of Legislative Assembly
- 16th Rajasthan Legislative Assembly
- Incumbent Deepti Kiran Maheshwari
- Party: Bharatiya Janata Party
- Elected year: 2021

Rajsamand Assembly constituency is one of the 200 Legislative Assembly constituencies of Rajasthan state in India. It is in Rajsamand district and is a part of Rajsamand Lok Sabha Constituency.

== Member of Legislative Assembly ==
Year	Member	Party
1957	Niranjan Nath Acharya	Indian National Congress
1962	Niranjan Nath Acharya	Indian National Congress
1967	Amritlal	Indian National Congress
1972	Nana Lal	Indian National Congress
1977	Kailash Chandra	Janata Party
1980	Nana Lal	Indian National Congress (I)
1985	Nana Lal	Indian National Congress
1990	Shanti Lal Khoiwal	Bharatiya Janata Party
1993	Shanti Lal Khoiwal	Bharatiya Janata Party
1998	Banshi Lal Gehlot	Bharatiya Janata Party
2003	Banshi Lal Khatik	Bharatiya Janata Party
2008	Kiran Maheshwari	Bharatiya Janata Party
2013	Kiran Maheshwari	Bharatiya Janata Party
2018	Kiran Maheshwari	Bharatiya Janata Party
2021*	Deepti Maheshwari	Bharatiya Janata Party
2023	Deepti Maheshwari	Bharatiya Janata Party

== Election results ==
=== 2023 ===
2023 Rajasthan Legislative Assembly election: Rajsamand
Party	Candidate	Votes	%	±%
BJP	Deepti Kiran Maheshwari	94,043	53.5	−1.6
INC	Narayan Singh Bhati	62,081	35.31	−4.67
Independent	Dinesh Badala	13,599	7.74	
AAP	Ghanashyam Murdia	1,772	1.01	
NOTA	None of the above	1,238	0.7	−1.21
Majority		31,962	18.19	+3.07
Turnout		175,794	75.71	−0.85

=== 2021 ===
Bye Election, 2021: Rajsamand
Party	Candidate	Votes	%	±%
BJP	Deepti Maheshwari	74,704	49.74	
INC	Tansukh Bohra	69,394	46.21	
RRP	Hitesh Shakya	117	0.7	N/A
NOTA	None of the above	1,586	1.06	
Majority		5,310		
Turnout		1,50,234	67.51	
BJP hold		Swing		

=== 2018 ===
Rajasthan Legislative Assembly Election, 2018: Rajsamand
Party	Candidate	Votes	%	±%
BJP	Kiran Maheshwari	89,709	55.1	
INC	Narayan Singh Bhati	65,086	39.98	
NOTA	None of the above	3,109	1.91	
Majority		24,623	15.12	
Turnout		162,812	76.56	
BJP hold		Swing		

=== 2013 ===
2013 Rajasthan Legislative Assembly election: Rajsamand
Party	Candidate	Votes	%	±%
BJP	Kiran Maheshwari	84,263	58.30	
INC	Hari Singh Rathor	53,688	37.14	
NOTA	None of the above	3,083	2.13	
CPI	Narayan Jawa	1,968	1.36	
Majority		30,575	21.16	
Turnout		1,44,619	77.26	
BJP hold		Swing		

== See also ==
- List of constituencies of the Rajasthan Legislative Assembly
- Rajsamand district
