= Deepti Kiran Maheshwari =

Indian politician

Member of the Rajasthan Legislative Assembly
- Incumbent
- Assumed office 6 May 2021
- Preceded by: Kiran Maheshwari
- Constituency: Rajsamand

Member, Women and Child Welfare Committee
- Incumbent
- Assumed office 12 July 2021

Personal details
- Born: 27 April 1987 (age 38) Udaipur, Rajasthan, India
- Party: Bharatiya Janata Party
- Spouse: Shashank Shinghvi
- Children: 1
- Parent: Kiran Maheshwari (mother)
- Education: MBA, Diploma in Business Management
- Alma mater: Welingkar Institute of Management Development and Research; IIM Udaipur
- Occupation: Politician, businesswoman
- Website: deeptikiranmaheshwari.com

Deepti Kiran Maheshwari or Deepti Maheshwari is an Indian politician currently serving as a member of the 16th Rajasthan Legislative Assembly, representing the Rajsamand constituency. She is the daughter of former Rajsamand assembly member Kiran Maheshwari and is a nominee from the Bharatiya Janata Party.

== Early life and education ==
She was born on 27 April 1987 to a Chartered Accountant, Dr. Satyanarayan Maheshwari and Kiran Maheshwari in Udaipur. She did BBA from Pune in 2008 and did her Post Graduate Diploma in Business Management - Welingkar Institute of Management Development and Research, Mumbai in year 2010. She also holds a Post Graduate Diploma in Women Entrepreneurship - IIM Udaipur (year 2012).

She is Convener, Kiran Maheshwari Smriti Manch. She is also a Special Invitee Member, Executive Committee, BJP Rajasthan. She is Area Chair Person, Rajasthan Ladies Circle (an International Organization), involved since childhood with Lions Club India and Bharat Vikas Parishad. She facilitates public education through Savarkar Smriti and Mrigendra Bharati. She has organised discussions on important national issues. She is actively involved in organising health care and Yoga Seminars and mass marriages (सामूहिक विवाह आयोजन). She is listed as mentor for Ek Kadam working in skill development.

== Political life ==
Her mother Kiran Maheshwari was a member of Rajsamand constituency until 2020. She died on 30 November 2020 as a result of COVID-19, leading to a by-election for the Rajsamand constituency in 2021. The BJP gave the ticket to Deepti and she won the by-elections.

Following the 2023 Rajasthan Legislative Assembly election, she was re-elected as an MLA from the Rajsamand Assembly constituency.

== Personal life ==
She is married to Shashank Shinghvi on 19 February 2011. The couple has a son.
