= Balwant Singh Mehta =

Indian politician

Member of Constituent Assembly of India
- Preceded by: Office established
- Succeeded by: Office abolished
- Constituency: Rajputana

Member of 1st Lok Sabha
- Preceded by: Office established
- Succeeded by: Deenbandhu Parmar
- Constituency: Udaipur Lok Sabha constituency

Personal details
- Born: 8 February 1900
- Died: 31 January 2003 (aged 102)
- Spouse: Sugandh Kumari
- Education: Fergusson University

Balwant Singh Mehta (8 February 1900 – 31 January 2003) was an Indian politician and freedom fighter who served as a Member of Constituent Assembly of India and the 1st Lok Sabha from Udaipur Lok Sabha constituency.

== Personal life ==
He was born on 8 February 1900 and graduated from Fergusson University. He married Sugandh Kumari at a very young age. On 4 October 1938, he was arrested and served one year in jail. He was the founder of the Pratap newspaper. He died on 31 January 2003 at the age of 103.
