= Dhuleshwar Meena =

Indian politician

Dhuleshwar Meena Ex-MP

Member of Parliament, Rajya Sabha
- In office 1980–1992
- Constituency: Rajasthan

Member of Parliament, Lok Sabha
- In office 1962–1971
- Preceded by: Deenbandhu Parmar
- Succeeded by: Laljibhai Meena
- Constituency: Udaipur, Rajasthan

Personal details
- Born: 5 August 1935
- Party: Indian National Congress

Dhuleshwar Meena was an Indian politician. He was a Member of Parliament, representing Rajasthan in the Rajya Sabha the upper house of India's Parliament as a member of the Indian National Congress.
