= Aspur Assembly constituency =

Legislative Assembly constituency in Rajasthan State, India

Coordinates: 23.95°N 74.08°E

Aspur
- Constituency No. 159 for the Rajasthan Legislative Assembly

Constituency details
- Country: India
- Region: North India
- State: Rajasthan
- District: Dungarpur
- Lok Sabha constituency: Udaipur
- Established: 1977
- Total electors: 270,023
- Reservation: ST

Member of Legislative Assembly
- 16th Rajasthan Legislative Assembly
- Incumbent Umesh Meena
- Party: BAP
- Alliance: INDIA

Aspur Assembly constituency is one of the 200 Legislative Assembly constituencies of Rajasthan state in India.

It is part of Dungarpur district and is reserved for candidates belonging to the Scheduled Tribes. As of 2023, it is represented by Umesh Meena of the Bharat Adivasi Party.

== Members of the Legislative Assembly ==
Election	Name	Party
2008	Raiyaji	Indian National Congress
2013	Gopi Chand Meena	Bharatiya Janata Party
2018	Gopi Chand Meena	Bharatiya Janata Party
2023	Umesh Meena	Bharat Adivasi Party

== Election results ==
=== 2023 ===
2023 Rajasthan Legislative Assembly election: Aspur
Party	Candidate	Votes	%	±%
BAP	Umesh Meena	93,742	46.7	
BJP	Gopichand	64,802	32.29	▼2.83
INC	Rakesh Roat	31,630	15.76	▼10.21
AAP	Mukesh Kumar Ahari	3,043	1.52	
Independent	Mukesh	3,011	1.5	
NOTA	None of the above	3,086	1.54	▼1.18
Majority		28,940	14.41	▲11.13
Turnout		200,715	74.33	▲7.26
BAP gain from BJP		Swing		

=== 2018 ===
Rajasthan Legislative Assembly Election, 2018: Aspur
Party	Candidate	Votes	%	±%
BJP	Gopi Chand Meena	57,062	35.12	
BTP	Umesh Meena	51,732	31.84	
INC	Raiya Meena	42,185	25.97	
BSP	Shanta Kalasua	2,996	1.84	
Independent	Shivlal Maida	2,121	1.31	
Bharatiya Yuva Shakti	Devilal Meena	1,942	1.2	
NOTA	None of the above	4,426	2.72	
Majority		5,330	3.28	
Turnout		162,464	67.07	
BJP hold		Swing		

== See also ==
- List of constituencies of the Rajasthan Legislative Assembly
- Dungarpur district
