= Shanta Meena =

Indian politician

Member of Rajasthan Legislative Assembly
- Incumbent
- Assumed office 23 November 2024
- Preceded by: Amrit Lal Meena
- Constituency: Salumber

Personal details
- Political party: Bharatiya Janata Party
- Profession: Politician

Shanta Amrit Lal Meena also known as Shanta Meena is an Indian politician from Rajasthan. She is a member of the Rajasthan Legislative Assembly since 2024, representing Salumber Assembly constituency as a member of the Bharatiya Janata Party.

== See also ==
- List of chief ministers of Rajasthan
- Rajasthan Legislative Assembly
