= Salil Gewali =

Indian writer and journalist (born 1971)

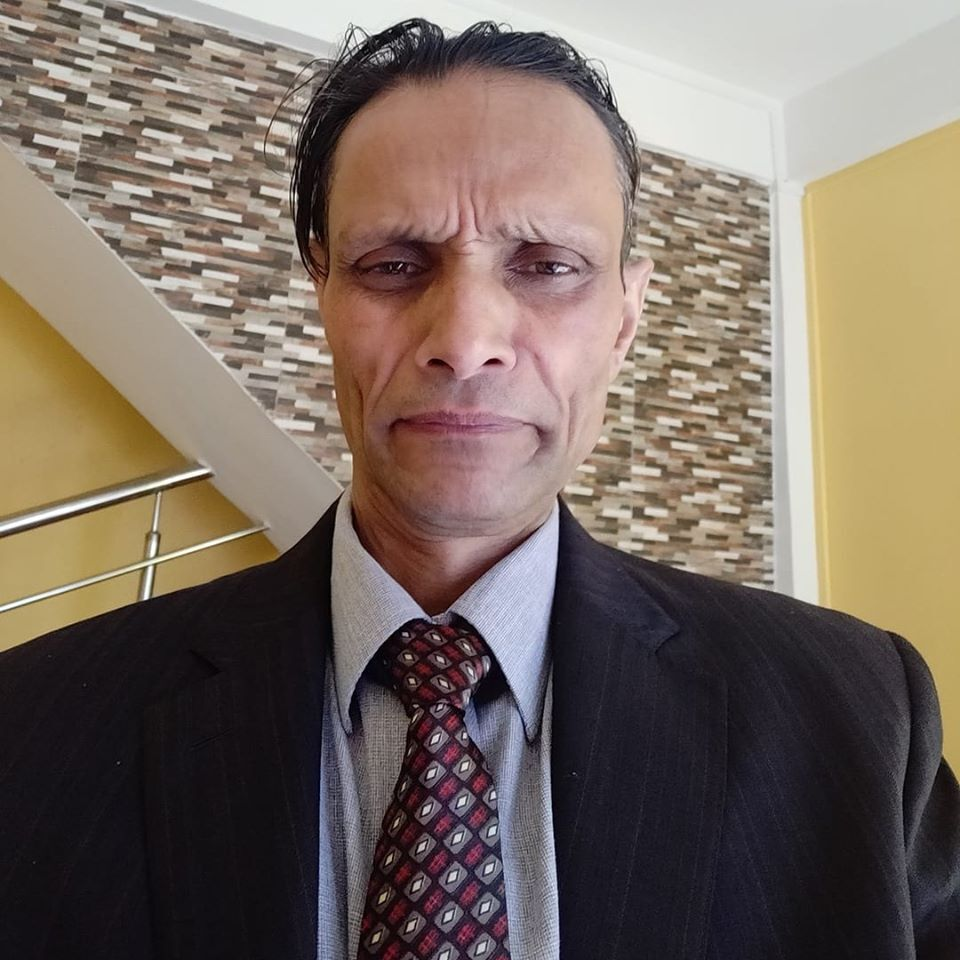
- Born: 21 January 1971 (age 55); Shillong, Meghalaya, India
- Occupations: Writer, publisher, and journalist
- Spouse: Ganga Gewali
- Writing career
- Years active: 1980–present
- Genres: Philosophy, history
- Notable works: Great Minds on India (1998), Know Your India (2022)
- Website: omit -->

Salil Gewali (born 21 January 1971) is an Indian researcher, writer and journalist. He is a writer of 18 books, including school textbooks. He is best known for the publication of the book Great Minds on India. The book is an outcome of an extensive research spanning over two decades. It has been translated into fifteen languages.

== Early life and education ==
Gewali was born in Shillong, Meghalaya in 1971 to Krishna Parsad Gewali and Bharati Gewali. His father was a scholar of ancient scriptures and also a writer. Salil Gewali passed his School Leaving Certificate examination from Mawprem Modern High School in 1986 and joined St. Anthony's College, Shillong, Meghalaya for further studies.

== Literary career ==
Gewali started his career as a freelance writer in late 1980s. Gewali is credited with several articles on social menaces, such as drug abuse, alcoholism and social media addiction among youths discussing how they have adversely affected society at large. He has prolifically written to raise awareness about the environmental fallout due to excessive exploitation of the Earth's crust and greenhouse gas emissions. His articles and letters appear in several local, national and international newspapers and magazines.

From an early age, Gewali was inspired to study various ancient texts, and the philosophy of Vedanta and the Bhagavad Gita fascinated him the most. Gewali was convinced from early age that world-renowned Quantum physicists including Erwin Schrödinger, Niels Bohr, Julius Oppenheimer, Werner Heisenberg, and Brian David Josephson; and also front-ranking philosophers of the modern times including Voltaire, Johann Goethe, Hegel, Ralph Waldo Emerson and Henry Thoreau had obtained ideas for their researches and writings from the ancient Indian literature. Gewali had undertaken his research from this belief and it also greatly influenced writing of his book Great Minds on India.

Gewali is also an India correspondent for Davidvance media of London, UK. He is appointed as a volunteer of International Human Rights Commission, Zürich, Switzerland in 2022.

=== Great Minds on India ===
ISBN 978-81-920846-0-2

Gewali published his book entitled Great Minds on India from Penguin Books in 2013. The first edition of the book was published in Xerox format in 1998 and the regular print was published in 2009 which was formally launched by the Governor of Meghalaya – Ranjit Shekhar Mooshahary. Later, the book was translated in fifteen languages including German, Urdu, Arabic, Telugu, Malayalam, Marathi, Hindi, Gujarati and Nepali. It is a collection of the thoughts and quotes of world-renowned personalities on India's cultural heritage and ancient wisdom. It is edited by a former NASA scientist – Prof A.V. Murali of Houston, USA and prefaced by a NASA Chief scientist – Dr. Kamlesh Lulla of Texas, USA. The book was launched by the respective Government of Gujarat, Maharashtra, Chhattisgarh and Meghalaya.

The Bengali version of the book was released on 5 July 2019, by the Governor of West Bengal Keshari Nath Tripathi at Raj Bhavan in Kolkata. The book has been translated by Dr RN Das and edited by Prof. Nirmal Maity of Kolkata. The German edition of Great Minds on India has been translated by Caroline Hagen of Cologne, Germany. In 2022 the German edition of Great Minds on India was released by the Chief Minister of Meghalaya, Conrad Sangma. On 9 December 2022, the Chief Minister of Manipur, N. Biren Singh and the Chief Minister of Sikkim, Prem Singh Tamang, jointly released the Manipuri edition of Gewali's book in Manipur. The Urdu edition has been translated by Dr. Syed Hussain, edited by Abdul Khalique and published by a Muslim organisation, Dr. APJ Abdul Kalam Foundation of Howrah, West Bengal. The Urdu edition was released by the Governor of Assam, Gulab Chand Kataria on 13 June 2023, at Raj Bhavan, Guwahati.

Nepali edition

The Nepali edition of Great Minds on India was translated by Dr. Govinda Raj Bhattarai, Head of the Department of English at Tribhuvan University in Kathmandu. The edition was formally launched in 2013 by Dr. Jaya Raj Acharya, a scholar and former Ambassador of Nepal to the United Nations.

==== Arabic edition ====
On 4 October 2024, the Arabic edition of Great Minds on India was officially launched in Doha, Qatar, at a literary event hosted by Anjuman Muhibban-E-Urdu-Hind in the presence of eminent writers, media journalists, and filmmakers from Qatar, Pakistan, and India. The Arabic translation was carried out by Prof. Mohammed Ramzan Ali Miya, a noted writer from Doha, while the edition was edited by Hamdan Bin Rashid of Madrid, Spain. Prior to this, the book was also released in Dubai by renowned business magnate and philanthropist Dr. Bu Abdullah. The title was published by Dr. APJ Abdul Kalam Foundation, Howrah, West Bengal.

==== Punjabi edition ====
On 7 April 2025, the Punjabi edition of Great Minds on India was launched in Patiala, Punjab, by eminent poet and writer Jaswant Singh Zafar, who also serves as the Director of the Language Department, Government of Punjab. The book was translated from its original English version to Punjabi by Assistant Director Shri Aalok Chawla of the Language Department, featuring a foreword by former Director Dr. Veerpal Kaur.

Governments of Karnataka and Assam have also consented to translate Great Minds on India into their respective states' official languages such as— Kannada and Assamese. The book has also been prescribed by some schools in India and academic institutes run by NRIs in Virginia, USA.

=== Reception ===
In 2019, the Ministry of External Affairs, Government of India, acquired Great Minds on India for placement in embassy libraries worldwide, acknowledging its role in showcasing India's philosophical and cultural legacy to global audiences.

NASA Chief Scientist and Director Dr. Kamlesh Lulla of Houston comments on the book:

"Once in a while, a rare and thoughtful publication comes to life that transforms you, enlightens you, and enriches your knowledge. Mr. Salil Gewali's Great Minds on India is such a publication. Its timely arrival offers readers deep insights into India's immense contributions to global thought, through the words of some of the world's greatest minds."

At the International Conference in March 2026, the Rajiv Gandhi Cancer Institute and Research Centre in New Delhi presented copies of Great Minds on India to all national and international dignitaries.

=== Know Your India ===
ISBN 978-81-955377-6-1

Know Your India is Gewali's other title published in 2022 which was released by the Chief Minister of Sikkim, Prem Singh Tamang in Gangtok. The forewords to the book were written by an eminent Lahore-born scholar from London – Khalid Umar and another scholar Linda Epton from Perth, Australia. Know Your India is a collection of articles that are essentially about the significance of the literary wisdom of ancient India and its relevance in modern times. The book has been approved for use as a textbook for higher classes by Agrasain Balika Siksha Sadan, Howrah, West Bengal.

In June 2018, a short documentary on Great Minds on India was released by a Mumbai-based media house - Manthanhub.

Gewali has written a series of school textbooks that are prescribed by the Meghalaya Board of School Education (MBOSE) of the Government of Meghalaya. Some of the titles have also been approved as reference books for the Meghalaya Teacher Eligibility Test (MTET).

=== Learn Hindi Learn Khasi ===
ISBN 978-93-591299-8-3

Learn Hindi Learn Khasi is Gewali's first book published in 1991. In 2014 the book was formally approved for use in secondary classes by the Meghalaya Board of School Education, Meghalaya. The book has its Garo edition entitled Learn Hindi Learn Garo.

=== Awards and accolades ===
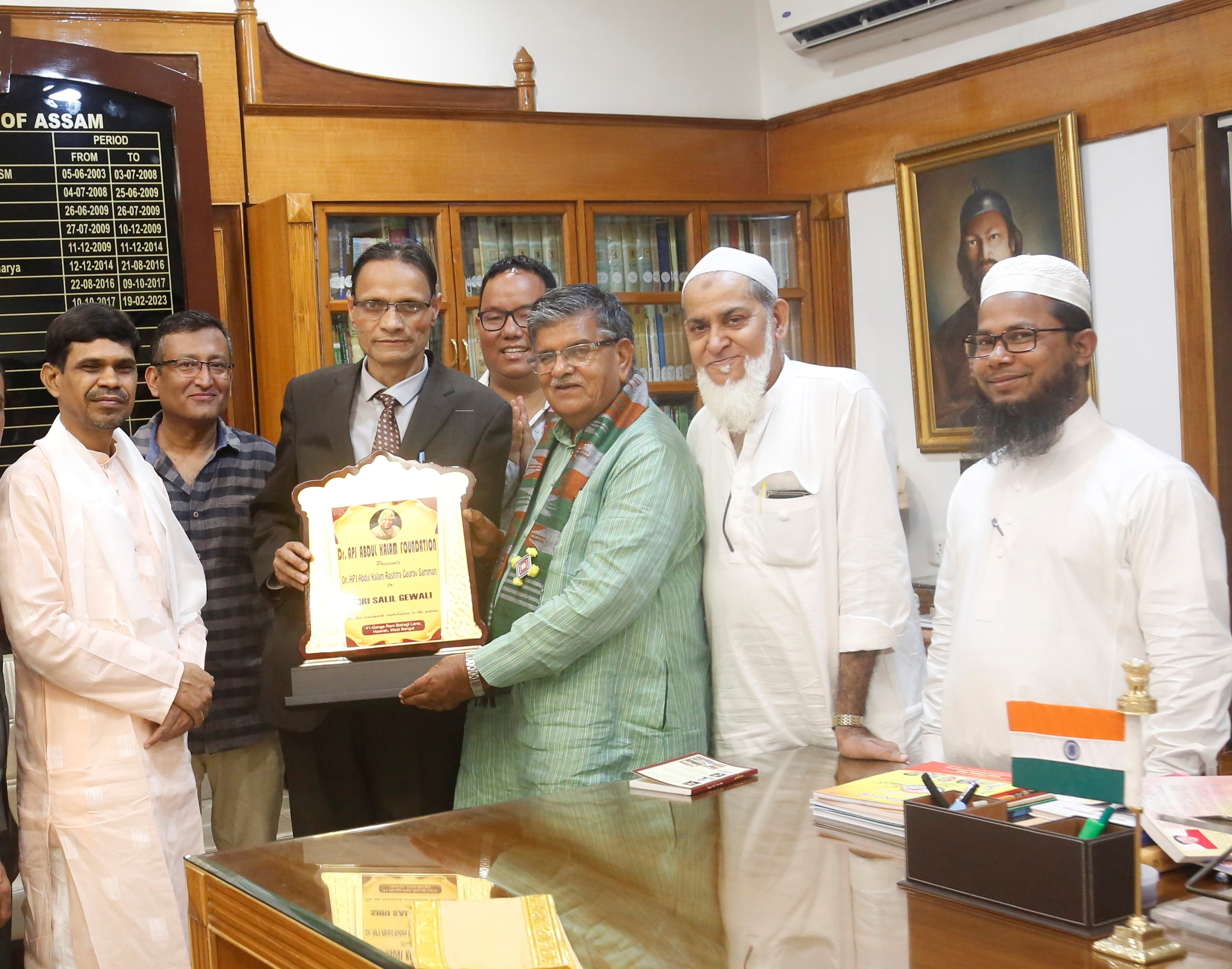
Gewali receives "Dr. APJ Abdul Kalam Rashtra Gaurav Samman Award" from the Governor of Assam, Gulab Chand Kataria, at Raj Bhavan, Guwahati.

Gewali has been honored with numerous awards for his literary and creative works since his early school days. From 1980 to 1984, he received consecutive Ananda Sammelan Puraskars and Bhanu Awards for his self-composed poems and essay writing. In 2011, he was recognized with the Thomas Jones Award by the United Christian Writers' Association for his literary contributions and service rendered to the nation. On 13 June 2023, Gewali was honored with "Dr. APJ Abdul Kalam Rashtra Gaurav Samman" by the Dr. APJ Abdul Kalam Foundation of Howrah, West Bengal, for his contributions to the nation. The award was formally presented to him by the Governor of Assam, Gulab Chand Kataria, at Raj Bhavan, Guwahati. Gewali also received the Literary Excellence Award from the All Assam Gorkha Students' Union for his contributions to literature and the propagation of Indian culture and heritage on 25 December 2023. He was conferred the Chhatrapati Shivaji Maharaj Rashtra Prem Samman award in June 2025 by the Mumbai-based youth organization, Yuva Heet Karini Sangh, in recognition of his patriotic service to the country through his research-based book and journalism. In October 2025, the Meghalaya Bihari Yuva Munch honoured Gewali with the Matribhumi Seva Puraskar. Gewali received the Global Wisdom Excellence Award from Reform Education for a New World in Virginia, United States, on International Yoga Day, 21 Jun 2026.
