= Gopi Chand Meena =

Indian politician

Member of the Rajasthan Legislative Assembly
- In office 2013–2023
- Succeeded by: Umesh Meena
- Constituency: Aspur

Personal details
- Party: Bharatiya Janata Party
- Occupation: Politician

Gopi Chand Meena is an Indian politician from the Bharatiya Janata Party and Former member of the Rajasthan Legislative Assembly representing the Aspur Vidhan Sabha constituency of Rajasthan.
