= Alkha Ram =

Indian politician

Member of Parliament, Lok Sabha
- In office 1984–1989
- Preceded by: Jai Narain Roat
- Succeeded by: Nand Lal Meena
- Constituency: Salumber

Personal details
- Born: 1940 (age 85–86)
- Party: Indian National Congress
- Spouse: Misri Devi

Alkha Ram is an Indian politician. He was elected to the Lok Sabha, the lower house of the Parliament of India, from Salumber in Rajasthan, as a member of the Indian National Congress.
