= Manna Lal Rawat =

Indian politician, academic, and social activist

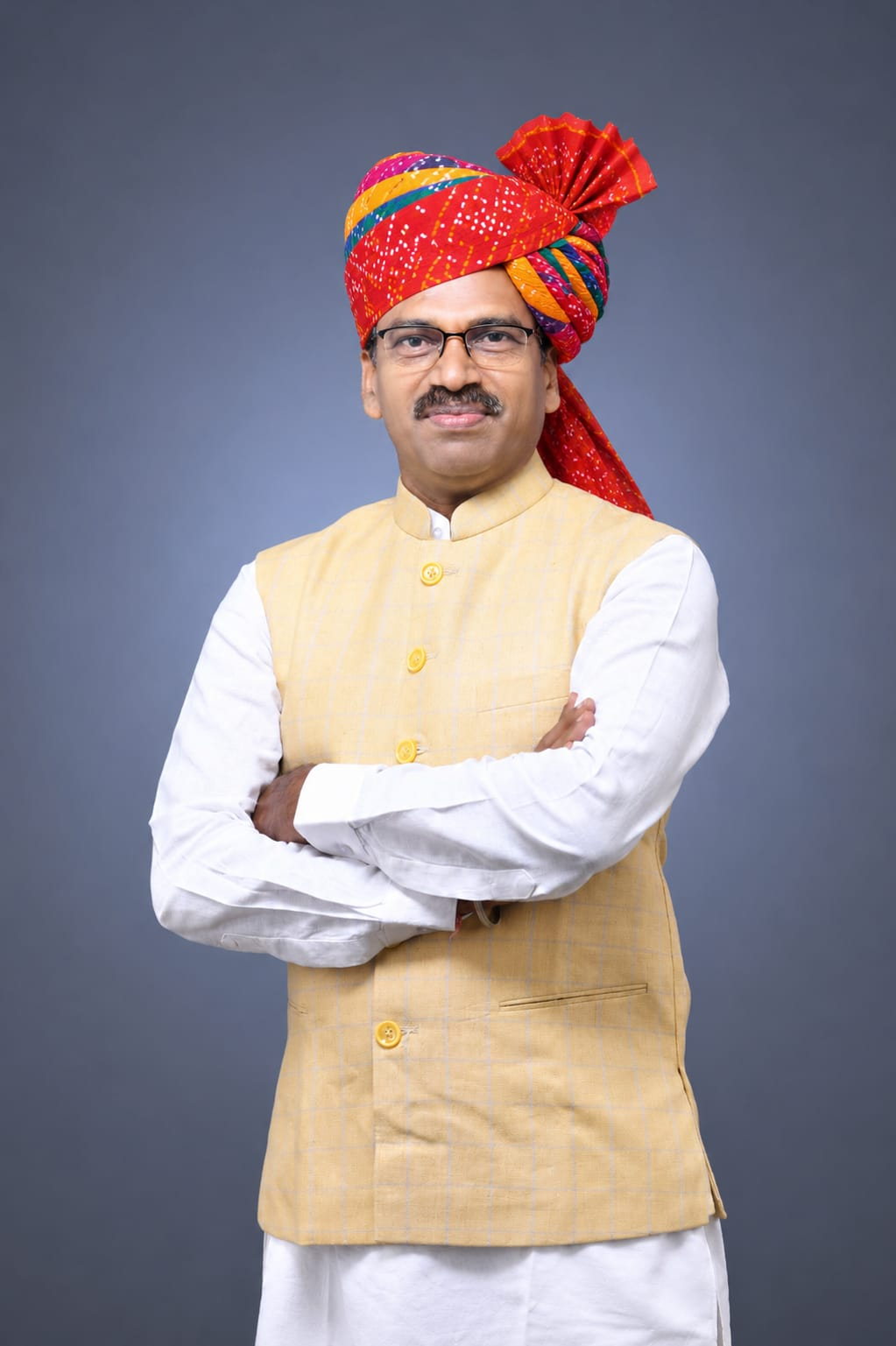
- Dr. Manna Lal Rawat in 2026

Member of Parliament, Lok Sabha
- Incumbent
- Assumed office 4 June 2024
- Preceded by: Arjunlal Meena
- Constituency: Udaipur

Personal details
- Born: January 7, 1972 (age 54) Chiklad, Pratapgarh, Rajasthan, India
- Party: Bharatiya Janata Party
- Spouse: Rajani P. Rawat
- Education: Mohanlal Sukhadia University (BSc, MA, PhD)

Dr. Manna Lal Rawat (Hindi pronunciation: [mən̪ːaː laːl ɾaːʋət̪]) is an Indian politician, academic, and social activist from Udaipur, Rajasthan. He was elected as a member of parliament from the Udaipur Lok Sabha constituency in 2024. He is a member of the Bharatiya Janata Party. Dr. Rawat is currently the National President of the Scheduled Tribe Morcha (ST Morcha) of the Bharatiya Janata Party.

== Early life and education ==
Manna Lal Rawat was born on 7 January 1972 in Chiklad, Pratapgarh, Rajasthan, to Gautam Lal and Jumali Bai. Rawat holds a PhD in Tribal issues from Mohanlal Sukhadia University in Udaipur.

== Career ==
In June 2024, Rawat won the election to represent the constituency of Udaipur Lok Sabha over Congress party rival, Taarachand Meena.

Rawat is a member of the Committee on Coal, Mines, and Steel, contributing to policy discussions on India's mining and steel industries. He is also member of advisory committee (Ministry of Agriculture & Farmers' Welfare) and Hindi Advisory Committee (Ministry of Statistics and Programme Implementation). Before entering politics, he was actively involved in academic and social work, focusing on tribal development and cultural preservation.

== Awards ==
Sansad Ratna Award 2025

== Social and cultural contributions ==
Rawat has been actively involved in several social and cultural initiatives:

- National Group Member in the delisting movement at the Akhil Bharatiya Vanvasi Kalyan Ashram.
- Director of the TEER Foundation, Nashik.
- Founding member of the Tribal Research and Knowledge Centre, New Delhi.
- Patron, Rajasthan State Bharat Scouts & Guides Local Association, Udaipur

== Publications ==
Rawat has authored and contributed to several books and collections:

- Lokniti aur Janjatiyan
- Janjatiya Hunkaar
- Aadivasi Samaaj, Sanskriti aur Sahitya (Editorial Board Member)
- Prikriti ke Swar (Co-writer in poetry collection)
- Atal Namo Path - 2024

== Special interests ==
Rawat is passionate about studying and addressing tribal issues, focusing on their identity, existence, and development. He also engages in discussions on topics of national interest.

== Personal life ==
Rawat is married to Dr. Rajani P. Rawat. The couple is actively involved in socio- cultural activities & have 2 children : a son, Suyash Katara and a daughter, Vedvati Katara.
