= Umesh Meena =

Indian politician

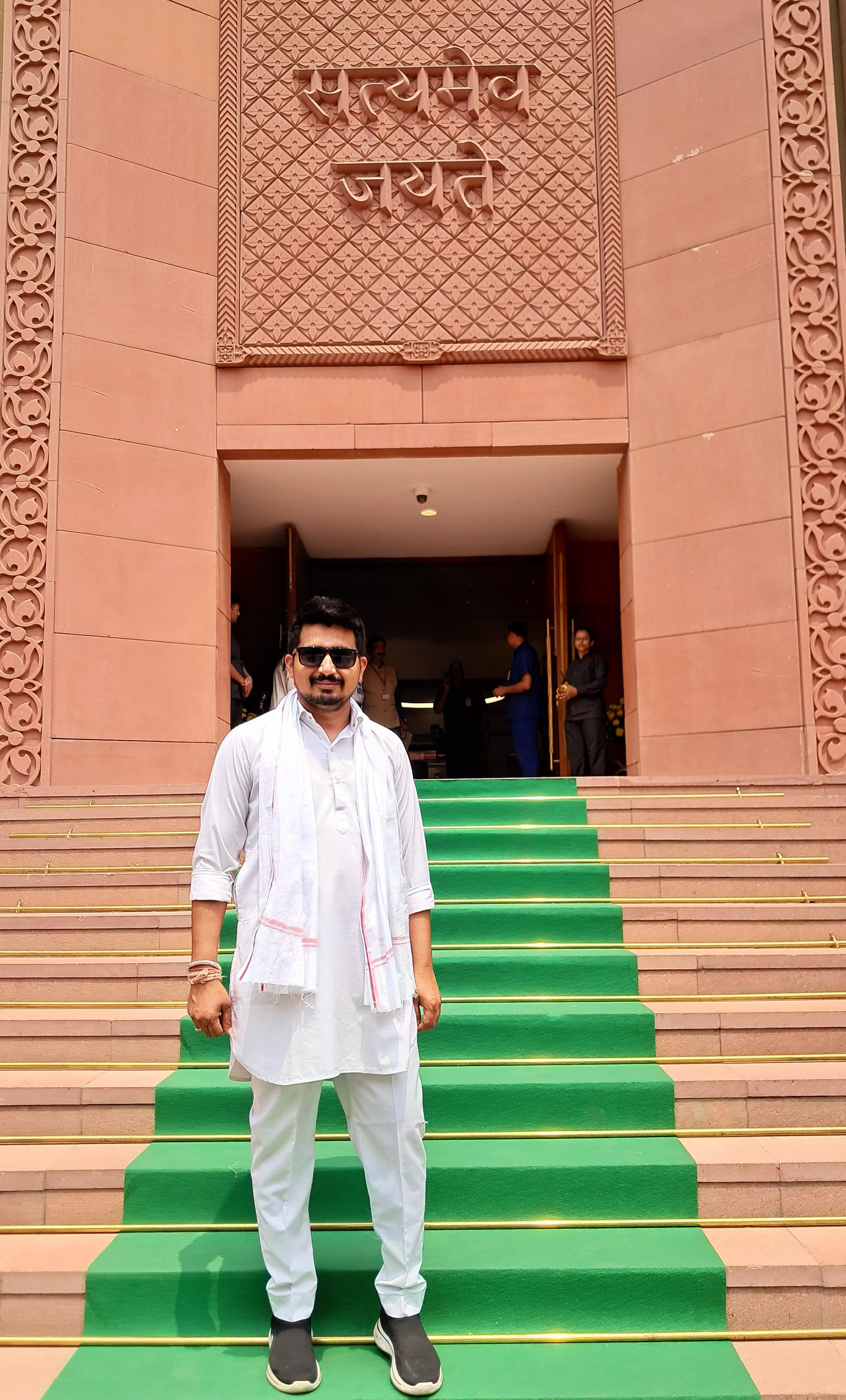
- Umesh Meena in 2024

Member of Rajasthan Legislative Assembly
- Incumbent
- Assumed office 3 Dec 2023
- Preceded by: Gopichand Meena
- Constituency: Aspur

Personal details
- Born: 25 August 1993 (age 33) Aspur, Dungarpur, Rajasthan, India
- Party: Bharat Adivasi Party
- Spouse: Kamla Ahari (m. 2022)
- Children: 1 (Unnati)
- Parent(s): Ratan Lal Meena (father); Ganga Devi (mother)
- Education: Mohanlal Sukhadia University (BA, LLB)
- Occupation: Politician

Umesh Meena (born 25 August 1993) is an Indian politician and a Member of the Rajasthan Legislative Assembly from Aspur Assembly constituency as a Member of the Bharat Adivasi Party. He won the 2023 Rajasthan Legislative Assembly election against Gopi Chand Meena, a candidate of Bharatiya Janata Party by securing 93,168 votes.

== Education ==
He graduated with a Bachelor of Arts (B.A.) in 2015 from Mohanlal Sukhadia University. Later, he pursued and completed a Bachelor of Laws (LL.B.) in 2022 from the same university.

== Political career ==
In 2023, he secured victory in the 2023 elections as Member of legislative Assembly from Aspur Constituency, defeating Gopichand Meena with a significant margin of 28,086 votes. Meena had previously contested the Aspur seat in the 2018 elections but failed to win by 5,300 votes.

In addition to his role as an MLA, Meena currently serves as a Member of the Ethics Committee of the Rajasthan Legislative Assembly.
