= Pratap Lal Bheel =

Member of the Rajasthan Legislative Assembly

Member of the Rajasthan Legislative Assembly
- Incumbent
- Assumed office 2013
- Constituency: Gogunda

Personal details
- Born: 1 September 1969 (age 56) Udaipur, Rajasthan, India
- Party: Bharatiya Janata Party
- Occupation: Agriculture
- Website: Pratap Lal Bheel profile on Rajassembly

Pratap Lal Bheel (born 6 January 1969) is an Indian politician who is an elected member from Gogunda Assembly constituency in Udaipur district of Rajasthan. And he is a member of the Bharatiya Janata Party.
