= Kiran Maheshwari =

Indian politician (1961–2020)

Member of the Rajasthan Legislative Assembly
- In office 2013–2020
- Constituency: Rajsamand

Member of Parliament for Udaipur
- In office 2004–2009
- Preceded by: Girija Vyas
- Succeeded by: Raghuveer Meena

Personal details
- Born: 29 October 1961 Udaipur, Rajasthan, India
- Died: 30 November 2020 (aged 59) Gurugram, Haryana, India
- Party: BJP
- Spouse: Satyanarayan Maheshwari
- Children: 2: a son and daughter, Deepti Kiran
- As of 24 November, 2009

Kiran Maheshwari (29 October 1961 – 30 November 2020) was an Indian politician from Rajasthan state, belonging to the Bharatiya Janata Party.

== Biography ==
She served as Member of Parliament for Udaipur constituency in the 14th Lok Sabha (2004–2009). She lost the May 2009 election to the 15th Lok Sabha from Ajmer Lok Sabha constituency to Sachin Pilot of the Indian National Congress. She then contested the Rajasthan Legislative Assembly elections from Rajsamand assembly seat in December 2013 and won by a margin of over 30,000 votes. She retained the seat in the 2018 Assembly election.

She tested positive for COVID-19 in the fall of 2020, and died a month later, on 30 November, after being hospitalized for the past 21 days at Medanta hospital in Gurugram, Haryana.

Lok Sabha
Preceded by Girija Vyas	Member of Parliament for Udaipur; 2004–2009	Succeeded by Raghuveer Meena
