= Tarachand Jain =

Indian politician

Tarachand Jain (born 1953) is an Indian politician from Rajasthan. He is a member of the Rajasthan Legislative Assembly from Udaipur Assembly constituency in Udaipur district. He won the 2023 Rajasthan Legislative Assembly election representing the Bharatiya Janata Party.

== Early life and education ==
Jain is from Udaipur, Rajasthan. He is the son of Kodarlal Jain. He studied Class 12 at Pre University Shramjivi College and passed the examinations in 1969. He is into the mining business in sukher region of udaipur and his wife is also a business partner.

== Career ==
Jain won from Udaipur Assembly constituency representing the Bharatiya Janata Party in the 2023 Rajasthan Legislative Assembly election. He polled 97,466 votes and defeated his nearest rival, Gourav Vallabh of the Indian National Congress, by a margin of 32,771 votes.
