= Mahaveer Bhagora =

Indian politician (1947–2021)

Member of the Parliament, Lok Sabha
- In office 2004–2009
- Preceded by: Bheru Lal Meena
- Succeeded by: does not exist
- Constituency: Salumber

Personal details
- Born: 17 April 1947 Udaipur, Rajasthan
- Died: 16 January 2021 (aged 73)
- Party: Bharatiya Janata Party
- Spouse: Lajwanti Bhagora
- Children: 3
- As of 14 September, 2006

Mahaveer Bhagora (17 April 1947 – 16 January 2021) was an Indian politician. He represented the Salumber constituency of Rajasthan in Lok Sabha from 2004 to 2009 and was a member of the Bharatiya Janata Party. He was a Christian by faith and his burial had sparked a debate in BJP circles. Bhagora died, aged 74, due to COVID-19.
