= Salumber Lok Sabha constituency =

Former constituency of the Indian parliament in Rajasthan

Coordinates: 24.1°N 74.0°E

Salumber
- Former Lok Sabha constituency

Constituency details
- Country: India
- Region: North India
- State: Rajasthan
- Established: 1952
- Abolished: 2008
- Reservation: ST

Salumbar was a Lok Sabha constituency of Rajasthan.

== Members of Parliament ==
- 1952-76:Constituency does not exist
- 1977: Laljibhai Meena, Janata Party
- 1980: Jai Narain Roat, Indian National Congress
- 1984: Alkha Ram, Indian National Congress
- 1989: Nand Lal Meena, Bharatiya Janata Party
- 1991: Bheru Lal Meena, Indian National Congress
- 1996: Bheru Lal Meena, Indian National Congress
- 1998: Bheru Lal Meena, Indian National Congress
- 1999: Bheru Lal Meena, Indian National Congress
- 2004: Mahaveer Bhagora, Bharatiya Janata Party
- 2008 onwards:Constituency does not exist

== Election results ==
=== 2004 ===
2004 Indian general elections: Salumber
Party	Candidate	Votes	%	±%
BJP	Mahaveer Bhagora	281,659	44.72	+2.30
INC	Bherulal Meena	256,885	40.79	−10.94
CPI	Meghraj Tawar	32,233	5.12	+1.13
NCP	Kika Bhai Meena	25,351	4.03	
CPI(ML)L	Puran Mal	22,029	3.50	+3.22
BSP	Hari Om Meena	11,677	1.85	+0.81
Majority		24,774	3.93	+12.24
Turnout		629,834	49.26	−2.39
BJP hold		Swing	+2.30	

== See also ==
- Salumbar
- List of constituencies of the Lok Sabha
