= Gogunda Assembly constituency =

Legislative Assembly constituency in Rajasthan State, India

Coordinates: 24.76°N 73.53°E

Gogunda
- Constituency No. 149 for the Rajasthan Legislative Assembly

Constituency details
- Country: India
- Region: North India
- State: Rajasthan
- District: Udaipur
- Lok Sabha constituency: Udaipur
- Established: 1972
- Total electors: 264,810
- Reservation: ST

Member of Legislative Assembly
- 16th Rajasthan Legislative Assembly
- Incumbent Pratap Lal Bheel
- Party: Bharatiya Janata Party

Gogunda Assembly constituency is one of the 200 Legislative Assembly constituencies of Rajasthan state in India.

It is part of Udaipur district, and is reserved for candidates belonging to the Scheduled Tribes. As of 2018, it is represented by Pratap Lal Bheel of the Bharatiya Janata Party.

== Members of the Legislative Assembly ==
| Year | Name | Party |
|---|---|---|
| 2008 | Mangi Lal Garasiya | Indian National Congress |
| 2013 | Pratap Lal Bheel | Bharatiya Janata Party |
| 2018 | Pratap Lal Bheel | Bharatiya Janata Party |
2023

== Election results ==
=== 2023 ===
Rajasthan Legislative Assembly Election, 2023: Gogunda
| Party | Candidate | Votes | % | ±% |
|---|---|---|---|---|
| BJP | Pratap Lal Bheel | 87,827 | 44.58 | −1.04 |
| INC | Mangi Lal Garasiya | 84,162 | 42.72 | −0.47 |
| BAP | Udai Lal Bhil | 8,094 | 4.11 | |
| BSP | Dalapat Ram Garasiya | 3,400 | 1.73 | −0.32 |
| CPI | Lahara | 2,773 | 1.41 | −1.0 |
| Independent | Prem Chand Gameti | 2,617 | 1.33 | |
| AAP | Hema Ram | 2,483 | 1.26 | |
| Independent | Batti Lal Meena | 2,114 | 1.07 | −0.74 |
| NOTA | None of the above | 3,527 | 1.79 | −0.52 |
| Majority | | 3,665 | 1.86 | −0.57 |
| Turnout | | 196,997 | 74.39 | +0.73 |
| BJP hold | | Swing | | |

=== 2018 ===
Rajasthan Legislative Assembly Election, 2018: Gogunda
| Party | Candidate | Votes | % | ±% |
|---|---|---|---|---|
| BJP | Pratap Lal Bheel | 82,599 | 45.62 | |
| INC | Dr. Mangi Lal Garasiya | 78,186 | 43.19 | |
| CPI | Lahara Bhil | 4,365 | 2.41 | |
| BSP | Champaram | 3,703 | 2.05 | |
| Independent | Batti Lal Meena | 3,272 | 1.81 | |
| Independent | Birdhi Lal Chhanwal | 2,406 | 1.33 | |
| NOTA | None of the above | 4,173 | 2.31 | |
| Majority | | 4,413 | 2.43 | |
| Turnout | | 181,039 | 73.66 | |

== See also ==
- List of constituencies of the Rajasthan Legislative Assembly
- Udaipur district
