= Bheru Lal Meena =

Indian politician (born 1934)

Member of Parliament, Lok Sabha
- In office 10 October 1999 – 6 February 2004
- Succeeded by: Mahaveer Bhagora
- Constituency: Salumber
- In office 10 March 1998 – 26 April 1999
- Constituency: Salumber
- In office 1996–1998
- Constituency: Salumber
- In office 1991–1996
- Preceded by: Nand Lal Meena
- Constituency: Salumber

Personal details
- Born: 1 January 1934 (age 92) Udaipur, Rajasthan
- Party: Indian National Congress

Bheru Lal Meena (born 1 January 1934) is an Indian former politician who was a member of 10th Lok Sabha from Salumber (Lok Sabha constituency) in Rajasthan.

Meena was born in Teedi, District Udaipur, Rajasthan on 1 January 1934. He was elected to 11th, 12th and 13th Lok Sabha from Salumber (Lok Sabha constituency).
