= Amrit Lal Meena =

Indian politician (1959–2024)

Member of the Rajasthan Legislative Assembly
- In office 2013 – 7 August 2024
- Preceded by: Basanti Devi
- Succeeded by: Shanta Devi Meena
- Constituency: Salumber

Personal details
- Born: 15 September 1959 Lalpuria, Udaipur district, Rajasthan, India
- Died: 8 August 2024 (aged 64) Udaipur, Rajasthan, India
- Party: Bharatiya Janata Party
- Occupation: Agriculture
- Website: Amrit Lal Meena profile on Rajassembly

Amrit Lal Meena (15 September 1959 – 8 August 2024) was an Indian politician who served as a member of the Rajasthan Legislative Assembly from the Salumber constituency in Udaipur district. He was a member of the Bharatiya Janata Party.

In July 2021, Meena was arrested in the case of a fake mark sheet.

Meena died of a heart attack in Udaipur, Rajasthan, on 8 August 2024, at the age of 64.
