= Indubala Sukhadia =

Indian politician and social leader

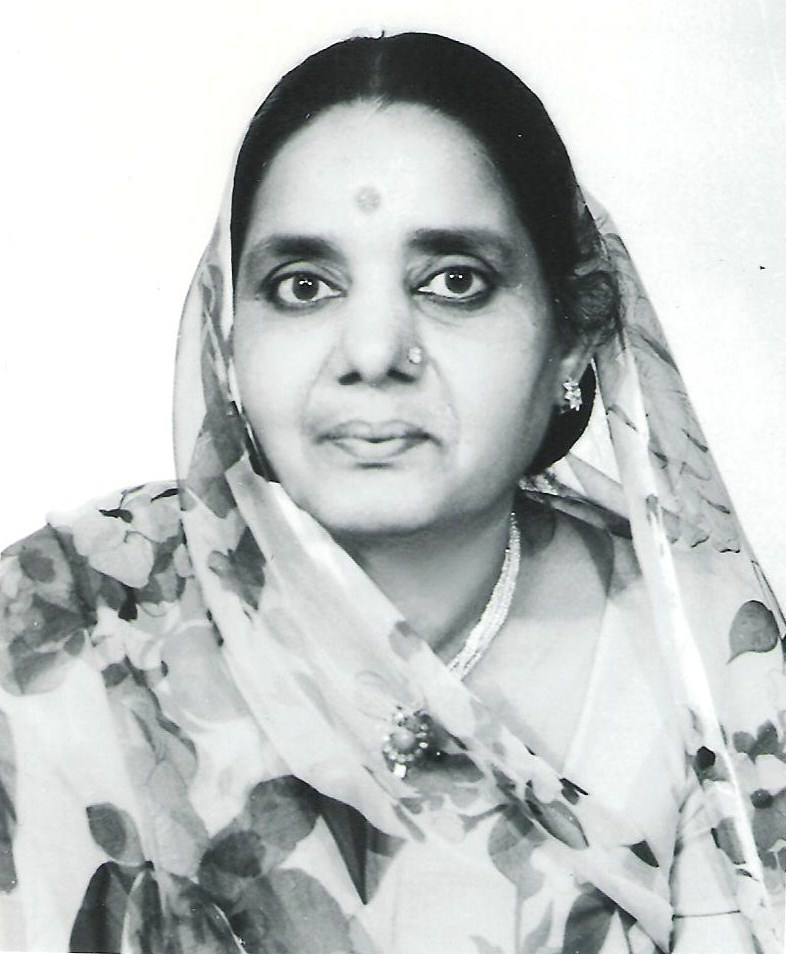

Indubala Sukhadia (2 July 1921 – 8 May 1999), wife of Mohanlal Sukhadia, was a social and political leader of Rajasthan. She was elected as Member of Parliament from Udaipur constituency in 1984. She died on May 8, 1999, at age 77 due to a cardiac arrest. She was cremated with full honours with a large number of people, including then chief minister Ashok Gehlot were present.
