= Raghuveer Meena =

Indian politician

Raghuvir Singh Meena

Member of Parliament, Lok Sabha
- In office 2009–2014
- Prime Minister: Manmohan Singh
- Succeeded by: Arjun Lal Meena
- Constituency: Udaipur

Personal details
- Born: 4 February 1959 (age 67) Udaipur, Rajasthan
- Party: Indian National Congress
- Spouse: Basanti Devi
- Profession: Agriculturist

Raghuvir Singh Meena (born 4 February 1959) is an Indian National Congress leader and member of Congress Working Committee (CWC).

He is Vice President of Rajasthan Pradesh Congress Committee. He was Member of 15th Lok Sabha. In 2009, he was elected to the Lok Sabha from Udaipur constituency in Rajasthan state. He is a former member of the Rajasthan Vidhan Sabha and a former minister in the Government of Rajasthan from 2002 to 2003. Raghuveer Singh Meena was State president of Rajasthan Youth Congress from 1997 to 2002

== Educational qualifications ==
Raghuveer SIngh Meena has completed his Bachelor of Arts from Vardhaman Mahaveer University, Rajasthan. He has completed his L.L.B. from University of Rajasthan.
