= Bhanu Kumar Shastri =

Indian politician

Bhanu Kumar Shastri (29 October 1925 – 24 February 2018) was a member of Lok Sabha from Udaipur in Rajasthan state in India. He also served as the president of Rajasthan state unit of Jan Sangh.
