= Mahu Kalan =

- Census town
- Location in Rajasthan, India Mahu Kalan (India)
- Coordinates: 26.4685°N 76.7102°E
- Country: India
- State: Rajasthan
- District: GangapurCity

Population (2001)
  - Total: 8,542

Languages
  - Official: Hindi
- Time zone: UTC+5:30 (IST)
- ISO 3166 code: RJ-IN

Mahu Kalan is a census town in Gangapur City district in the Indian state of Rajasthan.

== Demographics ==
As of 2001 India census, Mahu Kalan had a population of 8542. Males constitute 52% of the population and females 48%. Mahu Kalan has an average literacy rate of 60%, higher than the national average of 59.5%: male literacy is 74%, and female literacy is 45%. In Mahu Kalan, 17% of the population is under 6 years of age.
