= 15th Rajasthan Assembly =

Rajasthan Legislative Assembly after 2018 elections

←	14th Assembly	16th Assembly	→

Overview
- Legislative body: Rajasthan Legislative Assembly
- Jurisdiction: Rajasthan, India
- Term: 15 January 2019 – 2023
- Election: 2018 Rajasthan Legislative Assembly election
- Government: Indian National Congress
- Opposition: Bharatiya Janata Party
- Website: Rajasthan Legislative Assembly
- Members: 200
- Chief Minister: Ashok Gehlot
- Deputy Chief Minister: Vacant
- Speaker: C.P. Joshi
- Deputy Speaker: Vacant
- Leader of the Opposition: Rajendra Singh Rathore
- Deputy Leader of the Opposition: Satish Poonia

The 15th Rajasthan Legislative Assembly was elected in 2018.

== History ==
On 19 September 2022 it was reported that Ashok Gehlot was interested in running for the post of Congress president in the 2022 Indian National Congress presidential election. He officially confirmed on the 24th that he will be running for the post.

Post Gehlot announcing his intentions to run for the post, multiple MLA in Rajasthan expressed dissatisfaction. Concerns over the government power in Rajasthan grew within the party, with Pro-Gehlot MLA planning on submitting resignations if Sachin Pilot were to become the CM. On the 29th Gehlot met with Congress president Sonia Gandhi for an hour long meeting, post meeting Gehlot confirmed he will no longer be contesting for the post.

== Composition ==
Rajasthan Assembly, June 2019

Rajasthan Assembly May 2022

- In 2018 BTP supported the Congress government.
- Ramgarh, Rajasthan Assembly constituency became vacant after 2018 election results were cancelled.

In 2018
Party	Seats	Total	Bench
Indian National Congress	99	121	Government
Bahujan Samaj Party	6	121	Government
Rashtriya Lok Dal	1	121	Government
Bharatiya Tribal Party	2	121	Government
Independent	13	121	Government
Bharatiya Janata Party	73	78	Opposition
Rashtriya Loktantrik Party	3	78	Opposition
Communist Party of India (Marxist)	2	78	Opposition
Vacant	1	1	Vacant
Total Seats	200		

Rajasthan Assembly, December 2018

- On 16 September 2019, all the six BSP MLAs joined the Congress, thus taking the strength of the Congress to 105 seats in the assembly.
- On 24 October 2019, Congress won Mandawa assembly constituency and RLP retained Khinwsar assembly constituency in the 2019 by-elections held on 21 October 2019 which took their tally to 107 and 3 respectively.
- In July CPM MLA Balwan Poonia pledged his support to Ashok Gehlot government.
- On 23 June 2021, 13 independent MLAs supported CM Gehlot's government.
- In 2021, BTP withdrew support to Congress.

In 2021
Party	Seats	Total	Bench
Indian National Congress	107	122	Government
Rashtriya Lok Dal	1	122	Government
Independent	13	122	Government
Communist Party of India (Marxist)	1	122	Government
Bharatiya Janata Party	72	78	Opposition
Rashtriya Loktantrik Party	3	78	Opposition
Bharatiya Tribal Party	2	78	Opposition
Communist Party of India (Marxist)	1	78	Opposition
Total Seats	200		

- On 2 November 2021, after 2021 by-elections, Congress won Dhariawad constituency bypolls, taking tally of Congress to 108.

In 2022
Party	Seats	Total	Bench
Indian National Congress	108	122	Government
Rashtriya Lok Dal	1	122	Government
Independent	13	122	Government
Bharatiya Janata Party	70	77	Opposition
Rashtriya Loktantrik Party	3	77	Opposition
Bharatiya Tribal Party	2	77	Opposition
Communist Party of India (Marxist)	2	77	Opposition
Vacant	1		
Total Seats	200		

== Members of Legislative Assembly ==
District	No.	Constituency	Name	Party	Remarks
Sri Ganganagar	1	Sadulshahar	Jagdish Chander	Indian National Congress	
Sri Ganganagar	2	Ganganagar	Raj Kumar Gaur	Independent	
Sri Ganganagar	3	Karanpur	Gurmeet Singh Kooner	Indian National Congress	
Sri Ganganagar	4	Suratgarh	Rampratap Kasniyan	Bharatiya Janata Party	
Sri Ganganagar	5	Raisinghnagar (SC)	Balveer Singh Luthra	Bharatiya Janata Party	
Sri Ganganagar	6	Anupgarh (SC)	Santosh	Bharatiya Janata Party	
Hanumangarh	7	Sangaria	Gurdeep Singh	Bharatiya Janata Party	
Hanumangarh	8	Hanumangarh	Vinod Kumar	Indian National Congress	
Hanumangarh	9	Pilibanga (SC)	Dharmendra Kumar	Bharatiya Janata Party	
Hanumangarh	10	Nohar	Amit Chachan	Indian National Congress	
Hanumangarh	11	Bhadra	Balwan Poonia	Communist Party of India (Marxist)	
Bikaner	12	Khajuwala (SC)	Govind Ram Meghwal	Indian National Congress	
Bikaner	13	Bikaner West	B. D. Kalla	Indian National Congress	
Bikaner	14	Bikaner East	Siddhi Kumari	Bharatiya Janata Party	
Bikaner	15	Kolayat	Bhanwar Singh Bhati	Indian National Congress	
Bikaner	16	Lunkaransar	Sumit Godara	Bharatiya Janata Party	
Bikaner	17	Dungargarh	Girdharilal Mahiya	Communist Party of India (Marxist)	
Bikaner	18	Nokha	Bihari Lal Bishnoi	Bharatiya Janata Party	
Churu	19	Sadulpur	Krishna Poonia	Indian National Congress	
Churu	20	Taranagar	Narendra Budania	Indian National Congress	
Churu	21	Sardarshahar	Bhanwar Lal Sharma	Indian National Congress	Died on 9 October 2022
Churu	21	Sardarshahar	Anil Kumar Sharma	Indian National Congress	Won in 2022 bypoll
Churu	22	Churu	Rajendra Singh Rathore	Bharatiya Janata Party	
Churu	23	Ratangarh	Abhinesh maharshi	Bharatiya Janata Party	
Churu	24	Sujangarh (SC)	Bhanwarlal Meghwal	Indian National Congress	Died
Churu	24	Sujangarh (SC)	Manoj Meghwal	Indian National Congress	Elected in 2021 bypoll
Jhunjhunu	25	Pilani (SC)	J. P. Chandelia	Indian National Congress	
Jhunjhunu	26	Surajgarh	Subhash Poonia	Bharatiya Janata Party	
Jhunjhunu	27	Jhunjhunu	Brijendra Singh Ola	Indian National Congress	
Jhunjhunu	28	Mandawa	Narendra Kumar	Bharatiya Janata Party	resigned
Jhunjhunu	28	Mandawa	Rita Choudhary	Indian National Congress	Elected in 2019 bypoll
Jhunjhunu	29	Nawalgarh	Rajkumar Sharma	Indian National Congress	
Jhunjhunu	30	Udaipurwati	Rajendra Singh Gudha	Shiv Sena	Switched from BSP to INC
Jhunjhunu	31	Khetri	Jitendra Singh	Indian National Congress	
Sikar	32	Fatehpur	Hakam Ali Khan	Indian National Congress	
Sikar	33	Lachhmangarh	Govind Singh Dotasra	Indian National Congress	
Sikar	34	Dhod (SC)	Parasram Mordiya	Indian National Congress	
Sikar	35	Sikar	Rajendra Pareek	Indian National Congress	
Sikar	36	Dantaramgarh	Virendra Singh	Indian National Congress	
Sikar	37	Khandela	Mahadeo Singh	Independent	
Sikar	38	Neem Ka Thana	Suresh Modi	Indian National Congress	
Sikar	39	Srimadhopur	Deependra Singh Shekhawat	Indian National Congress	
Jaipur	40	Kotputli	Rajender Singh Yadav	Indian National Congress	
Jaipur	41	Viratnagar	Indraj Singh Gurjar	Indian national congress	
Jaipur	42	Shahpura	Alok Beniwal	Independent	
Jaipur	43	Chomu	Ramlal Sharma	Bharatiya Janata Party	
Jaipur	44	Phulera	Nirmal Kumawat	Bharatiya Janata Party	
Jaipur	45	Dudu (SC)	Babulal Nagar	Independent	
Jaipur	46	Jhotwara	Lalchand Kataria	Indian National Congress	
Jaipur	47	Amber	Satish Poonia	Bharatiya Janata Party	
Jaipur	48	Jamwa Ramgarh (ST)	Gopal Meena	Indian National Congress	
Jaipur	49	Hawa Mahal	Mahesh Joshi	Indian National Congress	
Jaipur	50	Vidhyadhar Nagar	Narpat Singh Rajvi	Bharatiya Janata Party	
Jaipur	51	Civil Lines	Pratap Singh Khachariyawas	Indian National Congress	
Jaipur	52	Kishanpole	Aminuddin Kagzi	Indian National Congress	
Jaipur	53	Adarsh Nagar	Rafeek Khan	Indian National Congress	
Jaipur	54	Malviya Nagar	Kalicharan Saraf	Bharatiya Janata Party	
Jaipur	55	Sanganer	Ashok Lahoty	Bharatiya Janata Party	
Jaipur	56	Bagru (SC)	Ganga Devi	Indian National Congress	
Jaipur	57	Bassi (ST)	Laxman Meena	Independent	
Jaipur	58	Chaksu (SC)	Ved Prakash Solanki	Indian National Congress	
Alwar	59	Tijara	Sandeep Yadav	Indian National Congress	Switched from BSP to INC
Alwar	60	Kishangarh Bas	Deepchand	Indian National Congress	Switched from BSP to INC
Alwar	61	Mundawar	Manjeet Dharmpal Choudhary	Bharatiya Janata Party	
Alwar	62	Behror	Baljeet Yadav	Independent	
Alwar	63	Bansur	Shakuntala Rawat	Indian National Congress	
Alwar	64	Thanagazi	Kanti Prasad Meena	Independent	
Alwar	65	Alwar Rural (SC)	Tikaram Jully	Indian National Congress	
Alwar	66	Alwar Urban	Sanjay Sharma	Bharatiya Janata Party	
Alwar	67	Ramgarh	Shafia Zubair	Indian National Congress	
Alwar	68	Rajgarh Laxmangarh (ST)	Johari Lal Meena	Indian National Congress	
Alwar	69	Kathumar (SC)	Babulal	Indian National Congress	
Bharatpur	70	Kaman	Zahida Khan	Indian National Congress	
Bharatpur	71	Nagar	Wajib Ali	Indian National Congress	Switched from BSP to INC
Bharatpur	72	Deeg-Kumher	Vishvendra Singh	Indian National Congress	
Bharatpur	73	Bharatpur	Subhash Garg	Rashtriya Lok Dal	
Bharatpur	74	Nadbai	Joginder Singh Awana	Indian National Congress	Switched from BSP to INC
Bharatpur	75	Weir (SC)	Bhajan Lal Jatav	Indian National Congress	
Dholpur	76	Bayana (SC)	Amar Singh Jatav	Indian National Congress	
Dholpur	77	Baseri (SC)	Khiladi Lal Bairwa	Indian National Congress	
Dholpur	78	Bari	Girraj Singh	Indian National Congress	
Dholpur	79	Dholpur	Shobharani Kushwah	Independent	Expelled from BJP
Dholpur	80	Rajakhera	Rohit Bohra	Indian National Congress	
Karauli	81	Todabhim (ST)	Prithviraj Meena	Indian National Congress	
Karauli	82	Hindaun (SC)	Bharosi Lal Jatav	Indian National Congress	
Karauli	83	Karauli	Lakhan Singh Meena	Indian National Congress	Switched from BSP to INC
Karauli	84	Sapotra (ST)	Ramesh Chand Meena	Indian National Congress	
Dausa	85	Bandikui	Gajraj Khatana	Indian National Congress	
Dausa	86	Mahuwa	Omprakash Hudla	Independent	
Dausa	87	Sikrai (SC)	Mamta Bhupesh	Indian National Congress	
Dausa	88	Dausa	Murari Lal Meena	Indian National Congress	
Dausa	89	Lalsot (ST)	Parsadi Lal Meena	Indian National Congress	
Sawai Madhopur	90	Gangapur	Ramkesh Meena	Independent	
Sawai Madhopur	91	Bamanwas (ST)	Indira Meena	Indian National Congress	
Sawai Madhopur	92	Sawai Madhopur	Danish Abrar	Indian National Congress	
Sawai Madhopur	93	Khandar (SC)	Ashok	Indian National Congress	
Tonk	94	Malpura	Kanhiya Lal	Bharatiya Janata Party	
Tonk	95	Niwai (SC)	Prasant Bairwa	Indian National Congress	
Tonk	96	Tonk	Sachin Pilot	Indian National Congress	
Tonk	97	Deoli-Uniara	Harish Meena	Indian National Congress	
Ajmer	98	Kishangarh	Suresh Tak	Independent	
Ajmer	99	Pushkar	Suresh Singh Rawat	Bharatiya Janata Party	
Ajmer	100	Ajmer North	Vasudev Devnani	Bharatiya Janata Party	
Ajmer	101	Ajmer South (SC)	Anita Bhadel	Bharatiya Janata Party	
Ajmer	102	Nasirabad	Ramswaroop Lamba	Bharatiya Janata Party	
Ajmer	103	Beawar	Shankar Singh	Bharatiya Janata Party	
Ajmer	104	Masuda	Rakesh Pareek	Indian National Congress	
Ajmer	105	Kekri	Raghu Sharma	Indian National Congress	
Nagaur	106	Ladnun	Mukesh Bhakhar	Indian National Congress	
Nagaur	107	Deedwana	Chetan Choudhary	Indian National Congress	
Nagaur	108	Jayal (SC)	Manju Meghwal	Indian National Congress	
Nagaur	109	Nagaur	Mohan Ram	Bharatiya Janata Party	
Nagaur	110	Khinwsar	Hanuman Beniwal	Rashtriya Loktantrik Party	resignation
Nagaur	110	Khinwsar	Narayan Beniwal	Rashtriya Loktantrik Party	Elected in 2019 bypoll
Nagaur	111	Merta (SC)	Indira Devi	Rashtriya Loktantrik Party	
Nagaur	112	Degana	Vijaypal Mirdha	Indian National Congress	
Nagaur	113	Makrana	Roopa Ram	Bharatiya Janata Party	
Nagaur	114	Parbatsar	Ramniwas Gawdiya	Indian National Congress	
Nagaur	115	Nawan	Mahendra Choudhary	Indian National Congress	
Pali	116	Jaitaran	Avinash Gehlot	Bharatiya Janata Party	
Pali	117	Sojat (SC)	Shobha Chouhan	Bharatiya Janata Party	
Pali	118	Pali	Gyanchand Parakh	Bharatiya Janata Party	
Pali	119	Marwar Junction	Khushveer Singh	Independent	
Pali	120	Bali	Pushpendra Singh	Bharatiya Janata Party	
Pali	121	Sumerpur	Joraram Kumawat	Bharatiya Janata Party	
Jodhpur	122	Phalodi	Pabba Ram Bishnoi	Bharatiya Janata Party	
Jodhpur	123	Lohawat	Kishna Ram Bishnoi	Indian National Congress	
Jodhpur	124	Shergarh	Meena Kanwar	Indian National Congress	
Jodhpur	125	Osian	Divya Maderna	Indian National Congress	
Jodhpur	126	Bhopalgarh (SC)	Pukhraj	Rashtriya Loktantrik Party	
Jodhpur	127	Sardarpura	Ashok Gehlot	Indian National Congress	
Jodhpur	128	Jodhpur	Manisha Panwar	Indian National Congress	
Jodhpur	129	Soorsagar	Suryakanta Vyas	Bharatiya Janata Party	
Jodhpur	130	Luni	Mahendra Bishnoi	Indian National Congress	
Jodhpur	131	Bilara (SC)	Heera Ram	Indian National Congress	
Jaisalmer	132	Jaisalmer	Rooparam	Indian National Congress	
Jaisalmer	133	Pokaran	Saleh Mohammad	Indian National Congress	
Barmer	134	Sheo	Ameen Khan	Indian National Congress	
Barmer	135	Barmer	Mewaram Jain	Indian National Congress	
Barmer	136	Baytoo	Harish Chaudhary	Indian National Congress	
Barmer	137	Pachpadra	Madan Prajapat	Indian National Congress	
Barmer	138	Siwana	Hameersingh Bhayal	Bharatiya Janata Party	
Barmer	139	Gudamalani	Hemaram Choudhary	Indian National Congress	
Barmer	140	Chohtan (SC)	Padma Ram	Indian National Congress	
Jalore	141	Ahore	Chhagan Singh	Bharatiya Janata Party	
Jalore	142	Jalore (SC)	Jogeshwar Garg	Bharatiya Janata Party	
Jalore	143	Bhinmal	Poora Ram Choudhary	Bharatiya Janata Party	
Jalore	144	Sanchore	Sukhram Bishnoi	Indian National Congress	
Jalore	145	Raniwara	Narayan Singh Dewal	Bharatiya Janata Party	
Sirohi	146	Sirohi	Sanyam Lodha	Independent	
Sirohi	147	Pindwara-Abu (ST)	Samaram Garasiya	Bharatiya Janata Party	
Sirohi	148	Reodar (SC)	Jagasi Ram	Bharatiya Janata Party	
Udaipur	149	Gogunda (ST)	Pratap Lal Bheel	Bharatiya Janata Party	
Udaipur	150	Jhadol (ST)	Babulal Kharadi	Bharatiya Janata Party	
Udaipur	151	Kherwara (ST)	Dayaram Parmar	Indian National Congress	
Udaipur	152	Udaipur Rural (ST)	Phool Singh Meena	Bharatiya Janata Party	
Udaipur	153	Udaipur	Gulab Chand Kataria	Bharatiya Janata Party	Resigned on 16 February 2023
Udaipur	153	Udaipur	Vacant		
Udaipur	154	Mavli	Dharm Narayan	Bharatiya Janata Party	
Udaipur	155	Vallabhnagar	Gajendra Singh Shaktawat	Indian National Congress	Died
Udaipur	155	Vallabhnagar	Preeti Shaktawat	Indian National Congress	Elected in 2021 bypoll
Udaipur	156	Salumber (ST)	Amrit Lal Meena	Bharatiya Janata Party	
Pratapgarh	157	Dhariawad (ST)	Gautam Lal Meena	Bharatiya Janata Party	
Pratapgarh	157	Dhariawad (ST)	Nagraj Meena	Indian National Congress	Elected in 2021 bypoll
Dungarpur	158	Dungarpur (ST)	Ganesh Ghogra	Indian National Congress	
Dungarpur	159	Aspur (ST)	Gopi Chand Meena	Bharatiya Janata Party	
Dungarpur	160	Sagwara (ST)	Ram Prasad	Bharatiya Tribal Party	
Dungarpur	161	Chorasi (ST)	Rajkumar Roat	Bharatiya Tribal Party	
Banswara	162	Ghatol (ST)	Harendra Ninama	Bharatiya Janata Party	
Banswara	163	Garhi (ST)	Kailash Chandra Meena	Bharatiya Janata Party	
Banswara	164	Banswara (ST)	Arjun Singh Bamnia	Indian National Congress	
Banswara	165	Bagidora (ST)	Mahendra Jeet Singh Malviya	Indian National Congress	
Banswara	166	Kushalgarh (ST)	Ramila Khadia	Independent	
Chittorgarh	167	Kapasan (SC)	Arjun Lal Jingar	Bharatiya Janata Party	
Chittorgarh	168	Begun	Bidhuri Rajendra Singh	Indian National Congress	
Chittorgarh	169	Chittorgarh	Chandrabhan SIngh Aakya	Bharatiya Janata Party	
Chittorgarh	170	Nimbahera	Anjana Udailal	Indian National Congress	
Chittorgarh	171	Bari Sadri	Lalit Kumar	Bharatiya Janata Party	
Pratapgarh	172	Pratapgarh (ST)	Ramlal Meena	Indian National Congress	
Rajsamand	173	Bhim	Sudarshan Singh	Indian National Congress	
Rajsamand	174	Kumbhalgarh	Surendra Singh	Bharatiya Janata Party	
Rajsamand	175	Rajsamand	Kiran Maheshwari	Bharatiya Janata Party	Died
Rajsamand	175	Rajsamand	Deepti Maheshwari	Bharatiya Janata Party	Elected in 2021 bypoll
Rajsamand	176	Nathdwara	C. P. Joshi	Indian National Congress	
Bhilwara	177	Asind	Jabbar Singh Sankhala	Bharatiya Janata Party	
Bhilwara	178	Mandal	Ramlal Jat	Indian National Congress	
Bhilwara	179	Sahara	Kailash Chandra Trivedi	Indian National Congress	Died
Bhilwara	179	Sahara	Gayatri Devi Trivedi	Indian National Congress	Elected in 2021 bypoll
Bhilwara	180	Bhilwara	Vitthal Shankar Avasthi	Bharatiya Janata Party	
Bhilwara	181	Shahpura	Kailash Chandra Meghwal	Bharatiya Janata Party	
Bhilwara	182	Jahazpur	Gopichand Meena	Bharatiya Janata Party	
Bhilwara	183	Mandalgarh	Gopal Lal Sharma	Bharatiya Janata Party	
Bundi	184	Hindoli	Ashok Chandna	Indian National Congress	
Bundi	185	Keshoraipatan (SC)	Chandrakanta Meghwal	Bharatiya Janata Party	
Bundi	186	Bundi	Ashok Dogara	Bharatiya Janata Party	
Kota	187	Pipalda	Ramnarayan Meena	Indian National Congress	
Kota	188	Sangod	Bharat Singh Kundanpur	Indian National Congress	
Kota	189	Kota North	Shanti Kumar Dhariwal	Indian National Congress	
Kota	190	Kota South	Sandeep Sharma	Bharatiya Janata Party	
Kota	191	Ladpura	Kalpana Devi	Bharatiya Janata Party	
Kota	192	Ramganj Mandi (SC)	Madan Dilawar	Bharatiya Janata Party	
Baran	193	Anta	Pramod Jain Bhaya	Indian National Congress	
Baran	194	Kishanganj (ST)	Nirmala Sahariya	Indian National Congress	
Baran	195	Baran-Atru (SC)	Pana Chand Meghwal	Indian National Congress	Pana Chand Meghwal submitted his resignation in August 2022
Baran	196	Chhabra	Pratap Singh	Bharatiya Janata Party	
Jhalawar	197	Dag (SC)	Kaluram	Bharatiya Janata Party	
Jhalawar	198	Jhalrapatan	Vasundhara Raje	Bharatiya Janata Party	
Jhalawar	199	Khanpur	Narendra Nagar	Bharatiya Janata Party	
Jhalawar	200	Manohar Thana	Govind Prasad	Bharatiya Janata Party	

== See also ==
- List of constituencies of Rajasthan Legislative Assembly
- Third Gehlot ministry
