= 1980 Rajasthan Legislative Assembly election =

Election in Indian state

← 1977	28 and 31 May 1980	1985 →

All 200 seats in the Rajasthan Legislative Assembly 101 seats needed for a majority
- Registered: 18,452,344
- Turnout: 51.06%
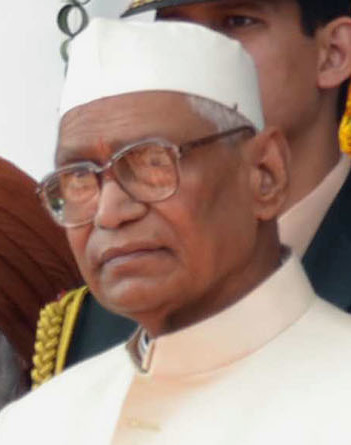
	Majority party	Minority party
		BJP
Leader	Jagannath Pahadia
Party	INC	BJP
Leader's seat	Weir (bypoll)
Seats before	41	New
Seats won	133	32
Seat change	92	New
Popular vote	42.96%	18.60%
CM before election
President's Rule
Elected CM
Jagannath Pahadia
INC(I)

Elections to the Rajasthan Legislative Assembly were held in May 1980, to elect members of the 200 constituencies in Rajasthan, India. The Indian National Congress (I) won a majority of seats as well as the popular vote, and its leader, Jagannath Pahadia was appointed as the Chief Minister of Rajasthan.

After the passing of The Delimitation of Parliamentary and Assembly Constituencies Order, 1976, Rajasthan's Legislative Assembly was assigned 200 constituencies.

== Result ==
Party	Votes	%	Seats	+/–
Indian National Congress (Indira)	3,975,315	42.96	133	New
Bharatiya Janata Party	1,721,321	18.60	32	New
Janata Party (Secular)	883,926	9.55	7	New
Janata Party	679,193	7.34	8	New
Indian National Congress (Urs)	516,887	5.59	6	New
Communist Party of India (Marxist)	111,476	1.20	1	0
Communist Party of India	89,382	0.97	1	0
Janata Party (Secular - Raj Narain)	63,321	0.68	0	New
Akhil Bharatiya Ram Rajya Parishad	1,558	0.02	0	0
Republican Party of India	55	0.00	0	New
Indian Union Muslim League	35	0.00	0	0
Independents	1,210,295	13.08	12	▲7
Total	9,252,764	100.00	200	0
Valid votes	9,252,764	98.20		
Invalid/blank votes	169,206	1.80		
Total votes	9,421,970	100.00		
Registered voters/turnout	18,452,344	51.06		
Source: ECI

== Elected members ==
Constituency	Reserved for (SC/ST/None)	Member	Party
Bhadra	None	Gyan Singh	Indian National Congress
Nohar	None	Laxmi Narain	Indian National Congress
Tibi	SC	Peeru Ram	Indian National Congress
Hanumangarh	None	Atam Ram	Indian National Congress
Sangaria	None	Mahinder Singh	Indian National Congress
Sriganganagar	None	Radhe Shyam S/o Hardayal	Indian National Congress
Kesrisinghpur	SC	Manfool Ram	Indian National Congress
Srikaranpur	None	Jagtar Singh	Indian National Congress
Raisinghnagar	SC	Dula Ram	Indian National Congress
Pilibanga	None	Jiv Raj Singh	Indian National Congress
Suratgarh	None	Sunil Kumar Bishnoi	Indian National Congress
Lunkaransar	None	Malu Ram Legha	Indian National Congress
Bikaner	None	Bulki Dass	Indian National Congress
Kolayat	None	Devi Singh	Janata Party
Nokha	SC	Suraja Ram	Indian National Congress
Dungargarh	None	Rawat Ram	Indian National Congress
Sujangarh	SC	Bhanwar Lal	Independent
Ratangarh	None	Jaidev Prasad	Indian National Congress
Sardarshahar	None	Mohan Lal	Bharatiya Janata Party
Churu	None	Bhalu Khan	Indian National Congress
Taranagar	None	Chandan Mal Baid	Indian National Congress
Sadulpur	None	Deepchand S/o Asha Ram	Independent
Pilani	None	Hajari Lal	Janata Party
Surajgarh	SC	Sundar Lal	Independent
Khetri	None	Mala Ram	Bharatiya Janata Party
Gudha	None	Virendra Pratap Singh	Janata Party
Nawalgarh	None	Bhanwar Singh	Indian National Congress
Jhunjhunu	None	Shish Ram Ola	Indian National Congress
Mandawa	None	Lachhu Ram	Janata Party
Fatehpur	None	Trilok Singh	Communist Party of India
Lachhmangarh	SC	Paras Ram	Indian National Congress
Sikar	None	Ghan Shyam Tiwadi	Bharatiya Janata Party
Dhod	None	Ram Deo Singh	Indian National Congress
Danta Ramgarh	None	Narayan Singh	Indian National Congress
Srimadhopur	None	Deependra Singh	Indian National Congress
Khandela	None	Mahadeo Singh	Indian National Congress
Neem Ka Thana	None	Mohan Lal	Independent
Chomu	None	Tejpal	Indian National Congress
Amber	None	Pushpa	Bharatiya Janata Party
Jaipur Rural	None	Ujala Arora	Bharatiya Janata Party
Hawa Mahal	None	Bhanwar Lal	Bharatiya Janata Party
Johribazar	None	Taki Uddin	Indian National Congress
Kishanpole	None	Shri Ram Gotewala	Indian National Congress
Bani Park	None	Shiv Ram Sharma	Indian National Congress
Phulera	None	Hari Singh	Indian National Congress
Dudu	SC	C.l. Kanwaria	Indian National Congress
Sanganer	None	Vidya Pathak	Bharatiya Janata Party
Phagi	SC	Ram Kanwar Bairwa	Janata Party
Lalsot	ST	Ram Sahai Sonad	Indian National Congress
Sikrai	ST	Ram Kishore Meena	Bharatiya Janata Party
Bandikui	None	Nathu Singh	Bharatiya Janata Party
Dausa	SC	Sohan Lal Bansiwal	Bharatiya Janata Party
Bassi	None	Jagdish Prasad Tiwari	Indian National Congress
Jamwa Ramgarh	None	Vaid Bhairu Lal Bhardwaj	Indian National Congress
Bairath	None	Kamla Beniwal	Indian National Congress
Kotputli	None	Shriram	Indian National Congress
Bansur	None	Badri Prasad	Indian National Congress
Behror	None	Sujan Singh	Indian National Congress
Mandawa	None	Ghasi Ram	Indian National Congress
Tijara	None	Deen Mohammad	Indian National Congress
Khairthal	SC	Sampat Ram	Indian National Congress
Ramgarh	None	Jai Krishan	Indian National Congress
Alwar	None	Jeet Mal Jain	Bharatiya Janata Party
Thanagazi	None	Sobha Ram	Indian National Congress
Rajgarh	ST	Samrath Lal	Bharatiya Janata Party
Lachhmangarh	None	Ishwar Lal Saini	Indian National Congress
Kathumar	SC	Babulal Bairwa	Independent
Kaman	None	Chau Khan	Janata Party
Nagar	None	Murad Khan	Indian National Congress
Deeg	None	Raja Man Singh	Independent
Kumher	None	Hari Singh	Indian National Congress
Bharatpur	None	Raj Bahadur	Indian National Congress
Rupbas	SC	Ram Prasad	Indian National Congress
Nadbai	None	Yadunath Singh	Janata Party
Weir	SC	Shanti	Indian National Congress
Bayana	None	Jagan Singh	Indian National Congress
Rajakhera	None	Pradhuman Singh	Indian National Congress
Dholpur	None	Banwari Lal	Indian National Congress
Bari	None	Shiv Singh Chauhan	Independent
Karauli	None	Janardan Singh	Indian National Congress
Sapotra	ST	Rangji Meena	Bharatiya Janata Party
Khandar	SC	Chunni Lal	Bharatiya Janata Party
Sawai Madhopur	None	Hansraj	Bharatiya Janata Party
Bamanwas	ST	Kunji Lal	Janata Party
Gangapur	None	Bharat Lal	Independent
Hindaun	SC	Bhorasi	Janata Party
Mahuwa	None	Hari Singh	Indian National Congress
Todabhim	ST	Chetram	Indian National Congress
Niwai	SC	Dwarka Prasad Bairwa	Indian National Congress
Tonk	None	Mahaveer Prasad	Bharatiya Janata Party
Uniara	None	Ram Lal	Indian National Congress
Todaraisingh	None	Chaturbhuj	Indian National Congress
Malpura	None	Surendra Vyas	Indian National Congress
Kishangarh	None	Kesri Chand Chowdhary	Indian National Congress
Ajmer East	SC	Kailash Chandra Meghwal	Bharatiya Janata Party
Ajmer West	None	Bhagwandass Shastri	Bharatiya Janata Party
Pushkar	None	Suraj Devi	Indian National Congress
Nasirabad	None	Govind Singh	Indian National Congress
Beawar	None	Vishnu Prakash Bajari	Indian National Congress
Masuda	None	Syed. Mohd. Ayas Maharaj	Indian National Congress
Bhinai	None	Bhagwati Devi	Indian National Congress
Kekri	SC	Tulsiram	Indian National Congress
Hindoli	None	Prabhu Lal	Indian National Congress
Nainwa	None	Surya Kumar	Indian National Congress
Patan	SC	Gopal	Janata Party
Bundi	None	Brij Sunder	Indian National Congress
Kota	None	Lalit Kishore	Bharatiya Janata Party
Ladpura	None	Ram Kishan	Indian National Congress
Digod	None	Dau Dayal Joshi	Bharatiya Janata Party
Pipalda	SC	Hira Lal Arya	Bharatiya Janata Party
Baran	None	Raghuvir Singh	Bharatiya Janata Party
Kishanganj	ST	Har Sahai	Indian National Congress
Atru	SC	Chhitar Lal Arya	Bharatiya Janata Party
Chhabra	None	Bhairon Singh Shekhawat	Bharatiya Janata Party
Ramganjmandi	None	Harish Kumar	Bharatiya Janata Party
Khanpur	None	Prithvi Singh	Indian National Congress
Manohar Thana	None	Bhairu Lal	Indian National Congress
Jhalrapatan	None	Anag Kumar	Bharatiya Janata Party
Pirawa	None	Shodan Singh	Independent
Dag	SC	Bal Chand	Bharatiya Janata Party
Begun	None	Ghanshyam	Indian National Congress
Gangrar	SC	Amar Chand	Indian National Congress
Kapasin	None	Mohan Lal	Indian National Congress
Chittorgarh	None	Shobrajmal	Indian National Congress
Nimbahera	None	Bhupal Singh	Bharatiya Janata Party
Badi Sadri	None	Udai Ram	Indian National Congress
Pratapgarh	ST	Nand Lal	Bharatiya Janata Party
Kushalgarh	ST	Fate Singh	Janata Party
Danpur	ST	Bahadur Singh	Janata Party
Ghatol	ST	Puji Lal	Indian National Congress
Banswara	None	Harideojoshi	Indian National Congress
Bagidora	ST	Nathoo Ram	Indian National Congress
Sagwara	ST	Kamla	Indian National Congress
Chorasi	ST	Govind Amaliya	Indian National Congress
Dungarpur	ST	Naathuram	Indian National Congress
Aspur	ST	Mahendra Kumar	Indian National Congress
Lasadia	ST	Kamla	Indian National Congress
Vallabhnagar	None	Kamlendra Singh	Janata Party
Mavli	None	Hanuman Prasad Prabhakar	Indian National Congress
Rajsamand	None	Nana Lal	Indian National Congress
Nathdwara	None	C. P. Joshi	Indian National Congress
Udaipur	None	Gulal Chand Kataria	Bharatiya Janata Party
Udaipur Rural	ST	Bheru Lal	Indian National Congress
Salumber	ST	Than Singh	Indian National Congress
Sarada	ST	Devendra Kumar	Indian National Congress
Kherwara	ST	Rooplal	Indian National Congress
Phalasia	ST	Alka Ram	Indian National Congress
Gogunda	ST	Meghraj Tawar	Communist Party of India
Kumbhalgarh	None	Heera Lal Deopura	Indian National Congress
Bhim	None	Laxmi Kumari	Indian National Congress
Mandal	None	Bihari Lal Pareek	Indian National Congress
Sahada	None	Rampal Upadhayaya	Indian National Congress
Bhilwara	None	Bansilal Patwa	Bharatiya Janata Party
Mandalgarh	None	Shiv Charan Mathur	Indian National Congress
Jahazpur	None	Ratan Lal Tambi	Independent
Shahpura	SC	Debi Lal	Indian National Congress
Banera	None	Devendra Singh	Indian National Congress
Asind	None	Nanuram	Indian National Congress
Jaitaran	None	Sheodan Singh	Indian National Congress
Raipur	None	Sukhlal Sencha	Indian National Congress
Sojat	None	Madhav Singh	Indian National Congress
Kharchi	None	Bheru Singh	Indian National Congress
Desuri	SC	Dinesh Dangi	Indian National Congress
Pali	None	Manak Mal Mehta	Indian National Congress
Sumerpur	None	Gokul Chandra Sharma	Indian National Congress
Bali	None	Aslam Khan	Indian National Congress
Sirohi	None	Devisahai Gopalia	Indian National Congress
Pindwara-Abu	ST	Bhuraram	Indian National Congress
Reodar	SC	Chhoga Ram Bakolia	Indian National Congress
Sanchore	None	Kanak Raj Mehta	Independent
Raniwara	None	Ratna Ram	Indian National Congress
Bhinmal	None	Suraj Pal Singh	Indian National Congress
Jalore	SC	Mangilal	Indian National Congress
Ahore	None	Samundar Kanwar	Indian National Congress
Siwana	SC	Dhara Ram	Indian National Congress
Pachpadra	None	Amra Ram	Indian National Congress
Barmer	None	Devdut	Indian National Congress
Gudamalani	None	Hemaram Chowdhary	Indian National Congress
Chohtan	None	Bhagwandas	Indian National Congress
Sheo	None	Amin Khan	Indian National Congress
Jaisalmer	None	Chadravir Singh	Bharatiya Janata Party
Shergarh	None	Khet Singh	Indian National Congress
Jodhpur	None	Ahmed Baksh Sindh	Indian National Congress
Sardarpura	None	Mansingh Devda	Indian National Congress
Sursagar	SC	Narpat Ram Barwar	Indian National Congress
Luni	None	Ram Singh Bisnoi	Indian National Congress
Bilara	None	Ram Narain Dudi	Indian National Congress
Bhopalgarh	None	Paras Ram Maderana	Indian National Congress
Osian	None	Narendra Singh Bhati	Indian National Congress
Phalodi	None	Poonam Chand Bisnoi	Indian National Congress
Nagaur	None	Maharam	Janata Party
Jayal	SC	Ram Karan	Indian National Congress
Ladnun	None	Ramdhan	Independent
Deedwana	None	Umed Singh	Janata Party
Nawan	None	Rameshwar Lal	Indian National Congress
Makrana	None	Abdul Rahman Chowdhary	Indian National Congress
Parbatsar	SC	Jeth Mal	Indian National Congress
Degana	None	Ram Raghunath	Indian National Congress
Merta	None	Ram Lal	Indian National Congress
Mundwa	None	Harendra Mirdha	Indian National Congress

== See also ==
- List of constituencies of the Rajasthan Legislative Assembly
- 1980 elections in India
