= 16th Rajasthan Assembly =

16th Legislative Assembly of Rajasthan

←	15th Assembly

Overview
- Legislative body: Rajasthan Legislative Assembly
- Jurisdiction: Rajasthan, India
- Meeting place: Vidhan Bhavan, Jaipur, Rajasthan, India
- Term: 2023 – 2028
- Election: 2023 Rajasthan Legislative Assembly election
- Government: Bharatiya Janata Party
- Opposition: Indian National Congress
- Website: Rajasthan Legislative Assembly
- Members: 200
- Speaker: Vasudev Devnani
- Deputy Speaker: vacant
- Chief Minister: Bhajan Lal Sharma
- Deputy Chief Minister: Diya Kumari & Prem Chand Bairwa
- Leader of the Opposition: Tika Ram Jully

The Sixteenth Legislative Assembly of Rajasthan was constituted after the 2023 Rajasthan Legislative Assembly elections which were concluded in November 2023 and the results were declared on 3 December 2023.

== Composition ==
As of 2025:

Alliance	Political party	No. of MLAs	Leader of the party
Government; NDA; Seats: 129	Bharatiya Janata Party	118	Bhajan Lal Sharma (Chief Minister)
Government; NDA; Seats: 129	Shiv Sena	2	Jaswant Singh Gurjar
Government; NDA; Seats: 129	Rashtriya Lok Dal	1	Subhash Garg
Government; NDA; Seats: 129	Independent	8	—N/a
Opposition; INDIA; Seats: 70	Indian National Congress	66	Ashok Gehlot (Leader of the Opposition)
Opposition; INDIA; Seats: 70	Bharat Adivasi Party	4	Rajkumar Roat
Total		200	

== Members of Legislative Assembly ==
District	Constituency		Member of Legislative Assembly		Remarks
District	No.	Name	Name	Party	Remarks
Sri Ganganagar	1	Sadulshahar	Gurveer Singh Brar	BJP	
Sri Ganganagar	2	Ganganagar	Jaydeep Bihani	BJP	
Sri Ganganagar	3	Karanpur	Rupinder Singh Kooner	INC	
Sri Ganganagar	4	Suratgarh	Dungar Ram Gedar	INC	
Sri Ganganagar	5	Raisinghnagar (SC)	Sohan Lal Nayak	INC	
Sri Ganganagar	6	Anupgarh (SC)	Shimla Devi	INC	
Hanumangarh	7	Sangaria	Abhimanyu Poonia	INC	
Hanumangarh	8	Hanumangarh	Ganesh Raj Bansal	IND	
Hanumangarh	9	Pilibanga (SC)	Vinod Gothwal	INC	
Hanumangarh	10	Nohar	Amit Chachan	INC	
Hanumangarh	11	Bhadra	Sanjeev Kumar Beniwal	BJP	
Bikaner	12	Khajuwala (SC)	Vishwanath Meghwal	BJP	
Bikaner	13	Bikaner West	Jethanand Vyas	BJP	
Bikaner	14	Bikaner East	Siddhi Kumari	BJP	
Bikaner	15	Kolayat	Anshuman Singh Bhati	BJP	
Bikaner	16	Lunkaransar	Sumit Godara	BJP	Cabinet Minister
Bikaner	17	Dungargarh	Tarachand Saraswat	BJP	
Bikaner	18	Nokha	Sushila Rameshwar Dudi	INC	
Churu	19	Sadulpur	Manoj Nyangli	SHS	Merged With Shiv Sena From BSP
Churu	20	Taranagar	Narendra Budania	INC	
Churu	21	Sardarshahar	Anil Kumar Sharma	INC	
Churu	22	Churu	Harlal Saharan	BJP	
Churu	23	Ratangarh	Poosaram Godara	INC	
Churu	24	Sujangarh (SC)	Manoj Meghwal	INC	
Jhunjhunu	25	Pilani (SC)	Pitram Singh Kala	INC	
Jhunjhunu	26	Surajgarh	Sharwan Kumar	INC	
Jhunjhunu	27	Jhunjhunu	Brijendra Singh Ola	INC	Resigned on 5 June 2024
Jhunjhunu	27	Jhunjhunu	Rajendra Bhamboo	BJP	Elected on 23 November 2024
Jhunjhunu	28	Mandawa	Rita Choudhary	INC	
Jhunjhunu	29	Nawalgarh	Vikram Singh Jakhal	BJP	
Jhunjhunu	30	Udaipurwati	Bhagawana Ram Saini	INC	
Jhunjhunu	31	Khetri	Dharampal Gurjar	BJP	
Sikar	32	Fatehpur	Hakam Ali Khan	INC	
Sikar	33	Lachhmangarh	Govind Singh Dotasra	INC	
Sikar	34	Dhod (SC)	Gordhan Verma	BJP	
Sikar	35	Sikar	Rajendra Pareek	INC	
Sikar	36	Dantaramgarh	Virendra Singh	INC	
Sikar	37	Khandela	Subhash Meel	BJP	
Sikar	38	Neem Ka Thana	Suresh Modi	INC	
Sikar	39	Srimadhopur	Jhabar Singh Kharra	BJP	MoS (I/C)
Jaipur	40	Kotputli	Hansraj Patel	BJP	
Jaipur	41	Viratnagar	Kuldeep Dhankad	BJP	
Jaipur	42	Shahpura	Manish Yadav	INC	
Jaipur	43	Chomu	Shikha Meel Barala	INC	
Jaipur	44	Phulera	Vidhyadhar Singh	INC	
Jaipur	45	Dudu (SC)	Prem Chand Bairwa	BJP	Deputy Chief Minister
Jaipur	46	Jhotwara	Rajyavardhan Singh Rathore	BJP	Cabinet Minister
Jaipur	47	Amber	Prashant Sharma	INC	
Jaipur	48	Jamwa Ramgarh (ST)	Mahendra Pal Meena	BJP	
Jaipur	49	Hawa Mahal	Balmukund Acharya	BJP	
Jaipur	50	Vidhyadhar Nagar	Diya Kumari	BJP	Deputy Chief Minister
Jaipur	51	Civil Lines	Gopal Sharma	BJP	
Jaipur	52	Kishanpole	Aminuddin Kagzi	INC	
Jaipur	53	Adarsh Nagar	Rafeek Khan	INC	
Jaipur	54	Malviya Nagar	Kali Charan Saraf	BJP	
Jaipur	55	Sanganer	Bhajan Lal Sharma	BJP	Chief Minister
Jaipur	56	Bagru (SC)	Kailash Chand Verma	BJP	
Jaipur	57	Bassi (ST)	Laxman Meena	INC	
Jaipur	58	Chaksu (SC)	Ramavtar Bairwa	BJP	
Alwar	59	Tijara	Mahant Balaknath	BJP	
Alwar	60	Kishangarh Bas	Deepchand Khairiya	INC	
Alwar	61	Mundawar	Lalit Yadav	INC	
Alwar	62	Behror	Jaswant Singh Yadav	BJP	
Alwar	63	Bansur	Devi Singh Shekhawat	BJP	
Alwar	64	Thanagazi	Kanti Prasad Meena	INC	
Alwar	65	Alwar Rural (SC)	Tika Ram Jully	INC	Leader of the opposition
Alwar	66	Alwar Urban	Sanjay Sharma	BJP	MoS (I/C)
Alwar	67	Ramgarh	Zubair Khan	INC	Died on 14 September 2024
Alwar	67	Ramgarh	Sukhavant Singh	BJP	Elected on 23 November 2024
Alwar	68	Rajgarh-Laxmangarh (ST)	Mangelal Meena	INC	
Alwar	69	Kathumar (SC)	Ramesh Khinchi	BJP	
Bharatpur	70	Kaman	Nauksham Chaudhary	BJP	
Bharatpur	71	Nagar	Jawahar Singh Bedham	BJP	MoS
Bharatpur	72	Deeg-Kumher	Shailesh Singh	BJP	
Bharatpur	73	Bharatpur	Subhash Garg	RLD	
Bharatpur	74	Nadbai	Jagat Singh	BJP	
Bharatpur	75	Weir (SC)	Bahadur Singh Koli	BJP	
Bharatpur	76	Bayana (SC)	Ritu Banawat	SHS	
Dholpur	77	Baseri (SC)	Sanjay Kumar Jatav	INC	
Dholpur	78	Bari	Jaswant Singh Gurjar	SHS	Merged With Shiv Sena From BSP
Dholpur	79	Dholpur	Shobha Rani Kushwaha	INC	
Dholpur	80	Rajakhera	Rohit Bohra	INC	
Karauli	81	Todabhim (ST)	Ghanshyam Mahar	INC	
Karauli	82	Hindaun (SC)	Anita Jatav	INC	
Karauli	83	Karauli	Darshan Singh Gurjar	BJP	
Karauli	84	Sapotra (ST)	Hansraj Meena	BJP	
Dausa	85	Bandikui	Bhagchand Saini Tankda	BJP	
Dausa	86	Mahuwa	Rajendra Meena	BJP	
Dausa	87	Sikrai (SC)	Vikram Bansiwal	BJP	
Dausa	88	Dausa	Murari Lal Meena	INC	Resigned on 5 June 2024
Dausa	88	Dausa	Deen Dayal Bairwa	INC	Elected on 23 November 2024
Dausa	89	Lalsot (ST)	Rambilas Meena	BJP	
Sawai Madhopur	90	Gangapur	Ramkesh Meena	INC	
Sawai Madhopur	91	Bamanwas (ST)	Indira Meena	INC	
Sawai Madhopur	92	Sawai Madhopur	Kirodi Lal Meena	BJP	Cabinet Minister
Sawai Madhopur	93	Khandar (SC)	Jitendra Kumar Gothwal	BJP	
Tonk	94	Malpura	Kanhaiya Lal Choudhary	BJP	Cabinet Minister
Tonk	95	Niwai (SC)	Ram Sahay Varma	BJP	
Tonk	96	Tonk	Sachin Pilot	INC	
Tonk	97	Deoli-Uniara	Harish Chandra Meena	INC	Resigned on 6 June 2024
Tonk	97	Deoli-Uniara	Rajendra Gurjar	BJP	Elected on 23 November 2024
Ajmer	98	Kishangarh	Vikash Choudhary	INC	
Ajmer	99	Pushkar	Suresh Singh Rawat	BJP	Cabinet Minister
Ajmer	100	Ajmer North	Vasudev Devnani	BJP	Speaker
Ajmer	101	Ajmer South (SC)	Anita Bhadel	BJP	
Ajmer	102	Nasirabad	Ramswaroop Lamba	BJP	
Ajmer	103	Beawar	Shankar Singh Rawat	BJP	
Ajmer	104	Masuda	Virendra Singh	BJP	
Ajmer	105	Kekri	Shatrughan Gautam	BJP	
Nagaur	106	Ladnun	Mukesh Bhakar	INC	
Nagaur	107	Deedwana	Yoonus Khan	IND	
Nagaur	108	Jayal (SC)	Manju Baghmar	BJP	MoS
Nagaur	109	Nagaur	Harendra Mirdha	INC	
Nagaur	110	Khinwsar	Hanuman Beniwal	RLP	Resigned on 18 June 2024
Nagaur	110	Khinwsar	Rewant Ram Danga	BJP	Elected on 23 November 2024
Nagaur	111	Merta (SC)	Laxman Ram Meghwal	BJP	
Nagaur	112	Degana	Ajay Singh	BJP	
Nagaur	113	Makrana	Zakir Hussain Gesawat	INC	
Nagaur	114	Parbatsar	Ramniwas Gawriya	INC	
Nagaur	115	Nawan	Vijay Singh Chaudhary	BJP	MoS
Pali	116	Jaitaran	Avinash Gehlot	BJP	Cabinet Minister
Pali	117	Sojat (SC)	Shobha Chauhan	BJP	
Pali	118	Pali	Bheem Raj Bhati	INC	
Pali	119	Marwar Junction	Kesaram Choudhary	BJP	
Pali	120	Bali	Pushpendra Singh	BJP	
Pali	121	Sumerpur	Joraram Kumawat	BJP	Cabinet Minister
Jodhpur	122	Phalodi	Pabba Ram Bishnoi	BJP	
Jodhpur	123	Lohawat	Gajendra Singh Khimsar	BJP	Cabinet Minister
Jodhpur	124	Shergarh	Babu Singh Rathore	BJP	
Jodhpur	125	Osian	Bhairaram Chaudhary	BJP	
Jodhpur	126	Bhopalgarh (SC)	Geeta Barwar	INC	
Jodhpur	127	Sardarpura	Ashok Gehlot	INC	
Jodhpur	128	Jodhpur	Atul Bhansali	BJP	
Jodhpur	129	Soorsagar	Devendra Joshi	BJP	
Jodhpur	130	Luni	Jogaram Patel	BJP	Cabinet Minister
Jodhpur	131	Bilara (SC)	Arjun Lal Garg	BJP	
Jaisalmer	132	Jaisalmer	Chhotu Singh Bhati	BJP	
Jaisalmer	133	Pokaran	Pratap Puri	BJP	
Barmer	134	Sheo	Ravindra Singh Bhati	IND	
Barmer	135	Barmer	Priyanka Chowdhary	IND	
Barmer	136	Baytoo	Harish Chaudhary	INC	
Barmer	137	Pachpadra	Arun Choudhary	BJP	
Barmer	138	Siwana	Hameer Singh Bhayal	BJP	
Barmer	139	Gudamalani	KK Vishnoi	BJP	MoS
Barmer	140	Chohtan (SC)	Aduram Meghwal	BJP	
Jalore	141	Ahore	Chhagan Singh Rajpurohit	BJP	
Jalore	142	Jalore (SC)	Jogeshwar Garg	BJP	
Jalore	143	Bhinmal	Samarjit Singh	INC	
Jalore	144	Sanchore	Jivaram Choudhary	IND	
Jalore	145	Raniwara	Ratan Devasi	INC	
Sirohi	146	Sirohi	Ota Ram Dewasi	BJP	MoS
Sirohi	147	Pindwara-Abu (ST)	Samaram Garasiya	BJP	
Sirohi	148	Reodar (SC)	Motiram Koli	INC	
Udaipur	149	Gogunda (ST)	Pratap Lal Bheel	BJP	
Udaipur	150	Jhadol (ST)	Babulal Kharadi	BJP	Cabinet Minister
Udaipur	151	Kherwara (ST)	Dayaram Parmar	INC	
Udaipur	152	Udaipur Rural (ST)	Phool Singh Meena	BJP	
Udaipur	153	Udaipur	Tarachand Jain	BJP	
Udaipur	154	Mavli	Pushkar Lal Dangi	INC	
Udaipur	155	Vallabhnagar	Udailal Dangi	BJP	
Udaipur	156	Salumber (ST)	Amrit Lal Meena	BJP	Died on 8 August 2024
Udaipur	156	Salumber (ST)	Shanta Amrit Meena	BJP	Elected on 23 November 2024
Pratapgarh	157	Dhariawad (ST)	Thavar Chand Meena	BAP	
Dungarpur	158	Dungarpur (ST)	Ganesh Ghogra	INC	
Dungarpur	159	Aspur (ST)	Umesh Meena	BAP	
Dungarpur	160	Sagwara (ST)	Shankarlal Decha	BJP	
Dungarpur	161	Chorasi (ST)	Rajkumar Roat	BAP	Resigned On 5 June 2024
Dungarpur	161	Chorasi (ST)	Anil Kumar Katara	BAP	Elected on 23 November 2024
Banswara	162	Ghatol (ST)	Nanalal Ninama	INC	
Banswara	163	Garhi (ST)	Kailash Chandra Meena	BJP	
Banswara	164	Banswara (ST)	Arjun Singh Bamaniya	INC	
Banswara	165	Bagidora (ST)	Mahendra Jeet Singh Malviya	INC	Resigned On 19 February 2024
Banswara	165	Bagidora (ST)	Jaikrishn Patel	BAP	Elected on 4 June 2024
Banswara	166	Kushalgarh (ST)	Ramila Khadiya	INC	
Chittorgarh	167	Kapasan (SC)	Arjun Lal Jingar	BJP	
Chittorgarh	168	Begun	Suresh Dhakar	BJP	
Chittorgarh	169	Chittorgarh	Chandrabhan Singh Aakya	IND	
Chittorgarh	170	Nimbahera	Shrichand Kriplani	BJP	
Chittorgarh	171	Bari Sadri	Gautam Kumar	BJP	MoS (I/C)
Pratapgarh	172	Pratapgarh (ST)	Hemant Meena	BJP	Cabinet Minister
Rajsamand	173	Bhim	Harisingh Rawat	BJP	
Rajsamand	174	Kumbhalgarh	Surendra Singh Rathore	BJP	
Rajsamand	175	Rajsamand	Deepti Maheshwari	BJP	
Rajsamand	176	Nathdwara	Vishvaraj Singh Mewar	BJP	
Bhilwara	177	Asind	Jabbar Singh Sankhala	BJP	
Bhilwara	178	Mandal	Udai Lal Bhadana	BJP	
Bhilwara	179	Sahara	Ladu Lal Pitliya	BJP	
Bhilwara	180	Bhilwara	Ashok Kumar Kothari	BJP	Switched to BJP
Bhilwara	181	Shahpura	Lalaram Bairwa	BJP	
Bhilwara	182	Jahazpur	Gopichand Meena	BJP	
Bhilwara	183	Mandalgarh	Gopal Lal Sharma	BJP	
Bundi	184	Hindoli	Ashok Chandna	INC	
Bundi	185	Keshoraipatan (SC)	C. L. Premi Bairwa	INC	
Bundi	186	Bundi	Harimohan Sharma	INC	
Kota	187	Pipalda	Chetan Patel Kolana	INC	
Kota	188	Sangod	Heeralal Nagar	BJP	MoS (I/C)
Kota	189	Kota North	Shanti Dhariwal	INC	
Kota	190	Kota South	Sandeep Sharma	BJP	
Kota	191	Ladpura	Kalpana Devi	BJP	
Kota	192	Ramganj Mandi (SC)	Madan Dilawar	BJP	Cabinet Minister
Baran	193	Anta	Kanwar Lal Meena	BJP	Disqualified on 23 May 2025
Baran	193	Anta	Pramod Jain Bhaya	INC	Elected on 14 November 2025
Baran	194	Kishanganj (ST)	Lalit Meena	BJP	
Baran	195	Baran-Atru (SC)	Radheyshayam Bairwa	BJP	
Baran	196	Chhabra	Pratap Singh Singhvi	BJP	
Jhalawar	197	Dag (SC)	Kaluram Meghwal	BJP	
Jhalawar	198	Jhalrapatan	Vasundhara Raje	BJP	
Jhalawar	199	Khanpur	Suresh Gurjar	INC	
Jhalawar	200	Manohar Thana	Govind Prasad	BJP	

== See also ==
- List of constituencies of Rajasthan Legislative Assembly
- Bhajan Lal Sharma ministry
