= 1985 Rajasthan Legislative Assembly election =

Election in Indian state

- 3 May 1985

All 200 seats in the Rajasthan Legislative Assembly 101 seats needed for a majority
- Registered: 21,228,702
- Turnout: 54.93%

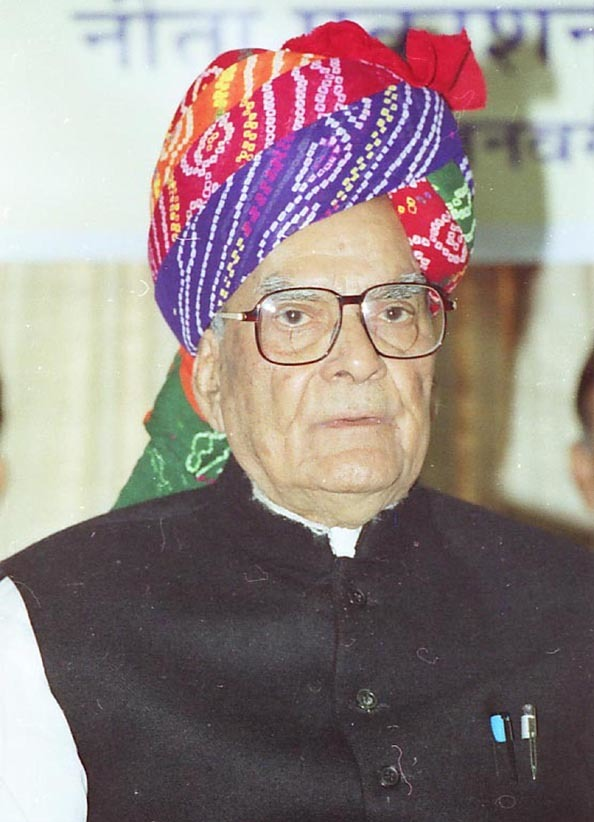

	Majority party	Minority party	Third party
Leader	Hari Dev Joshi	Bhairon Singh Shekhawat
Party	INC	BJP	CPI
Leader's seat	Banswara	Nimbahera and Amber (vacated)
Seats before	133	32
Seats won	113	39	1
Seat change	▼20	▲7
Popular vote	46.57%	21.24%	1.23%
CM before election
Hari Dev Joshi
INC
Elected CM
Hari Dev Joshi
INC

Elections to the Rajasthan Legislative Assembly were held in May 1985, to elect members of the 200 constituencies in Rajasthan, India. The Indian National Congress won a majority of seats as well as the popular vote, and its leader, Hari Dev Joshi was appointed as the Chief Minister of Rajasthan.

After the passing of The Delimitation of Parliamentary and Assembly Constituencies Order, 1976, Rajasthan's Legislative Assembly was assigned 200 constituencies.

== Result ==
Party	Votes	%	Seats	+/–
Indian National Congress	5,342,920	46.57	113	▼20
Bharatiya Janata Party	2,437,594	21.24	39	▲7
Lok Dal	1,360,826	11.86	27	New
Janata Party	675,103	5.88	10	▲2
Communist Party of India	141,063	1.23	1	0
Indian National Congress (Jagjivan)	74,176	0.65	0	New
Communist Party of India (Marxist)	66,921	0.58	0	▼1
Indian Congress (Socialist)	9,731	0.08	0	New
Independents	1,365,641	11.90	10	▼2
Total	11,473,975	100.00	200	0
Valid votes	11,473,975	98.40		
Invalid/blank votes	186,527	1.60		
Total votes	11,660,502	100.00		
Registered voters/turnout	21,228,702	54.93		
Source: ECI

== Elected members ==
Constituency	Reserved for (SC/ST/None)	Member	Party
Bhadra	None	Lal Chand	Lok Dal
Nohar	None	Lakshmi Narayan	Indian National Congress
Tibi	SC	Dungar Ram	Lok Dal
Hanumangarh	None	Shoopat Singh	Communist Party of India
Sangaria	None	Krishan Chandra	Indian National Congress
Ganganagar	None	Kedar	Janata Party
Kesrisinghpur	SC	Hira La Indora	Indian National Congress
Karanpur	None	Gurdeep Singh	Independent
Raisinghnagar	SC	Manphool Ram	Indian National Congress
Pilibanga	None	Jeev Raj Singh	Indian National Congress
Suratgarh	None	Hans Raj	Janata Party
Lunkaransar	None	Manik Chand Surana	Janata Party
Bikaner	None	Bulakidas Kalla	Indian National Congress
Kolayat	None	Devi Singh Bhati	Janata Party
Nokha	SC	Chunni Lal Indali	Lok Dal
Dungargarh	None	Rewant Ram	Indian National Congress
Sujangarh	SC	Chuni Lal Meghwal	Bharatiya Janata Party
Ratangarh	None	Hari Shankar Bhabhra	Bharatiya Janata Party
Sardarshahar	None	Bhanwar Lal	Lok Dal
Churu	None	Hamida Begum	Indian National Congress
Taranagar	None	Jai Narayan	Janata Party
Sadulpur	None	Inder Singh	Indian National Congress
Pilani	None	Sumitra Singh	Lok Dal
Surajgarh	SC	Sunder Lal	Indian National Congress
Khetri	None	Mala Ram	Bharatiya Janata Party
Gudha	None	Bhola Ram	Indian National Congress
Nawalgarh	None	Navrang Singh	Lok Dal
Jhunjhunu	None	Shish Ram Ola	Indian National Congress
Mandawa	None	Sudha	Indian National Congress
Fatehpur	None	Ask Ali	Indian National Congress
Lachhmangarh	SC	Keshar Deo	Lok Dal
Sikar	None	Ghanshyam Tiwari	Bharatiya Janata Party
Dhod	None	Ramdev Singh	Indian National Congress
Danta Ramgarh	None	Narain Singh	Indian National Congress
Srimadhopur	None	Har Lal Singh Kharra	Bharatiya Janata Party
Khandela	None	Mathodeo Singh	Indian National Congress
Neem Ka Thana	None	Phool Chand	Bharatiya Janata Party
Chomu	None	Rameshwar Dayal Yadav	Lok Dal
Amber	None	Bhairon Singh Shekhawat	Bharatiya Janata Party
Jaipur Rural	None	Ujala Arora	Bharatiya Janata Party
Hawa Mahal	None	Bhanwar Lal	Bharatiya Janata Party
Johribazar	None	Kali Charan Saraf	Bharatiya Janata Party
Kishanpole	None	Girdhari Lal Bhargave	Bharatiya Janata Party
Bani Park	None	Shiv Ram Sharma	Indian National Congress
Phulera	None	Laxminarain Kisan	Lok Dal
Dudu	SC	Jai Kishan	Indian National Congress
Sanganer	None	Vidya Pathak	Bharatiya Janata Party
Phagi	SC	Jai Narain Bairva	Indian National Congress
Lalsot	ST	Parsadi	Indian National Congress
Sikrai	ST	Prabhu Dayal	Indian National Congress
Bandikui	None	Chandra Shekhar Sharma	Indian National Congress
Dausa	SC	Bhudhar Mal	Indian National Congress
Bassi	None	Jagdish Prasad Tiwari	Indian National Congress
Jamwa Ramgarh	None	Vaidhya Bhairon Lal Bhardwaj	Indian National Congress
Bairath	None	Kamla	Indian National Congress
Kotputli	None	Mukti Lal	Independent
Bansur	None	Jagat Singh Dayama	Lok Dal
Behror	None	Sujan Singh	Indian National Congress
Mandawa	None	Mahendra Shastri	Lok Dal
Tijara	None	Jagmal Singh Yadava	Lok Dal
Khairthal	SC	Chandra Shekhar	Indian National Congress
Ramgarh	None	Raghuwar Dayal	Bharatiya Janata Party
Alwar	None	Pushpa Devi	Indian National Congress
Thanagazi	None	Rajesh	Indian National Congress
Rajgarh	ST	Ram Dhan	Indian National Congress
Lachhmangarh	None	Ishwar Lal Saini	Indian National Congress
Kathumar	SC	Babu Lal Bairwa	Indian National Congress
Kaman	None	Shamshul Hasan	Indian National Congress
Nagar	None	Sampat Singh	Lok Dal
Deeg	None	Krisnendra Kaur (deepa)	Independent
Kumher	None	Nathi Singh	Lok Dal
Bharatpur	None	Girraj Prasad Tiwari	Indian National Congress
Rupbas	SC	Vijay Singh	Indian National Congress
Nadbai	None	Yadunath Singh	Lok Dal
Weir	SC	Jagannath Pahadia	Indian National Congress
Bayana	None	Brijendra Singh	Indian National Congress
Rajakhera	None	Mohan Prakash	Lok Dal
Dholpur	None	Vasundhara Raje	Bharatiya Janata Party
Bari	None	Daljeet	Indian National Congress
Karauli	None	Shiv Charan Singh	Bharatiya Janata Party
Sapotra	ST	Rishikesh	Indian National Congress
Khandar	SC	Ram Gopal Sisodiya	Indian National Congress
Sawai Madhopur	None	Moti Lal	Independent
Bamanwas	ST	Bharat Lal	Indian National Congress
Gangapur	None	Harish Chandra Palliwal	Indian National Congress
Hindaun	SC	Umedi Lal	Indian National Congress
Mahuwa	None	Kirodi Lal Meena	Bharatiya Janata Party
Todabhim	ST	Mool Chand	Indian National Congress
Niwai	SC	Gyarsi Lal	Bharatiya Janata Party
Tonk	None	Zakiya Imnm	Indian National Congress
Uniara	None	Digvijai Singh	Janata Party
Todaraisingh	None	Mathoo Singh	Bharatiya Janata Party
Malpura	None	Narayan Singh	Janata Party
Kishangarh	None	Jagjeet Singh	Bharatiya Janata Party
Ajmer East	SC	Raj Kumar Jaipal	Indian National Congress
Ajmer West	None	Kishan Motwani	Indian National Congress
Pushkar	None	Ramzan Khan	Bharatiya Janata Party
Nasirabad	None	Govind Singh	Indian National Congress
Beawar	None	Manak Chand Dani	Indian National Congress
Masuda	None	Sohan Singh	Indian National Congress
Bhinai	None	Neelima	Indian National Congress
Kekri	SC	Lalit Bhati	Indian National Congress
Hindoli	None	Ganesh Lal	Bharatiya Janata Party
Nainwa	None	Prabhu Lal	Bharatiya Janata Party
Patan	SC	Mangi Lal	Bharatiya Janata Party
Bundi	None	Hari Mohan Sharma	Indian National Congress
Kota	None	Lalit Kishore Chaturvedi	Bharatiya Janata Party
Ladpura	None	Ram Kishan	Indian National Congress
Digod	None	Dau Dayal	Bharatiya Janata Party
Pipalda	SC	Heera Lal Arya	Bharatiya Janata Party
Baran	None	Shiv Narain	Indian National Congress
Kishanganj	ST	Heera Lal	Independent
Atru	SC	Mada Maharaja	Indian National Congress
Chhabra	None	Partap Singh	Bharatiya Janata Party
Ramganjmandi	None	Hari Kumar	Bharatiya Janata Party
Khanpur	None	Harish	Bharatiya Janata Party
Manohar Thana	None	Jagannath	Bharatiya Janata Party
Jhalrapatan	None	Jawala Prasad	Indian National Congress
Pirawa	None	Iqbal Ahmed	Indian National Congress
Dag	SC	Deep Chand	Indian National Congress
Begun	None	Pankaj Pancholi	Indian National Congress
Gangrar	SC	Amar Chand	Indian National Congress
Kapasin	None	Deenbandhu Verma	Indian National Congress
Chittorgarh	None	Laxman Singh	Indian National Congress
Nimbahera	None	Bheron Singh Sekhawat	Bharatiya Janata Party
Badi Sadri	None	Udai Ram Dhakad	Indian National Congress
Pratapgarh	ST	Dhan Raj Meena	Indian National Congress
Kushalgarh	ST	Ver Singh	Indian National Congress
Danpur	ST	Bahadur Singh	Lok Dal
Ghatol	ST	Navneer Lal Ninama	Bharatiya Janata Party
Banswara	None	Hari Dev Joshi	Indian National Congress
Bagidora	ST	Panna Lal	Indian National Congress
Sagwara	ST	Kamla Devi	Indian National Congress
Chorasi	ST	Shanker Lal	Indian National Congress
Dungarpur	ST	Nathu Ram	Indian National Congress
Aspur	ST	Mahendra Kumar	Indian National Congress
Lasadia	ST	Kamla	Indian National Congress
Vallabhnagar	None	Gulab Singh	Indian National Congress
Mavli	None	Hanuman Prasad Prabhakar	Indian National Congress
Rajsamand	SC	Madan Lal	Indian National Congress
Nathdwara	None	C. P. Joshi	Indian National Congress
Udaipur	None	Girija Vyas	Indian National Congress
Udaipur Rural	ST	Khem Raj	Indian National Congress
Salumber	ST	Than Singh	Indian National Congress
Sarada	ST	Bheru Lal Meena	Indian National Congress
Kherwara	ST	Daya Ram Parmar	Independent
Phalasia	ST	Kuber Singh	Indian National Congress
Gongunda	ST	Devendra Kumar Meena	Indian National Congress
Kumbhalgarh	None	Heera Lal Deopura	Indian National Congress
Bhim	None	Laxman Singh	Indian National Congress
Mandal	None	Bihari Lal Pareek	Indian National Congress
Sahada	None	Ram Lal Upadhyaya	Indian National Congress
Bhilwara	None	Pranvir	Indian National Congress
Mandalgarh	None	Shiv Charan Mathur	Indian National Congress
Jahazpur	None	Ratan Lal Tambi	Indian National Congress
Shahpura	SC	Debi Lal	Indian National Congress
Banera	None	Ramchandra Jat	Janata Party
Asind	None	Vijendra Pal Singh	Independent
Jaitaran	None	Pratap Singh	Indian National Congress
Raipur	None	Heera Singh Chouhan	Bharatiya Janata Party
Sojat	None	Madhav Singh Diwan	Indian National Congress
Kharchi	None	Khangar Singh Choudhary	Bharatiya Janata Party
Desuri	SC	Pokar Lal Parihar	Indian National Congress
Pali	None	Pushpa	Bharatiya Janata Party
Sumerpur	None	Bina Kak	Indian National Congress
Bali	None	Raghunath	Indian National Congress
Sirohi	None	Ram Lal	Indian National Congress
Pindwara-Abu	ST	Surma Ram	Indian National Congress
Reodar	SC	Chhoga Ram	Indian National Congress
Sanchore	None	Raghunath Alias Rugnath	Indian National Congress
Raniwara	None	Arjun Singh Deora	Independent
Bhinmal	None	Suraj Pal Singh	Indian National Congress
Jalore	SC	Mangi Lal Arya	Indian National Congress
Ahore	None	Bhagraj Chaudhary	Lok Dal
Siwana	SC	Mota Ram	Indian National Congress
Pachpadra	None	Champa Lal Banthiya	Bharatiya Janata Party
Barmer	None	Ganga Ram Chaudhary	Lok Dal
Gudamalani	None	Hema Ram Chaudhary	Indian National Congress
Chohtan	None	Abdul Hadi	Lok Dal
Sheo	None	Umed Singh	Janata Party
Jaisalmer	None	Multana Ram	Independent
Shergarh	None	Ratan Kanwar	Bharatiya Janata Party
Jodhpur	None	Bird Mal	Bharatiya Janata Party
Sardarpura	None	Man Singh Deora	Indian National Congress
Sursagar	SC	Narpat Ram	Indian National Congress
Luni	None	Ram Singh	Indian National Congress
Bilara	None	Rajendra Choudhary	Indian National Congress
Bhopalgarh	None	Narain Ram Bera	Lok Dal
Osian	None	Narendra Singh Bhati	Indian National Congress
Phalodi	None	Mohan Lal	Independent
Nagaur	None	Bamodar Das	Indian National Congress
Jayal	SC	Mohan Lal	Lok Dal
Ladnun	None	Harji Ram	Lok Dal
Deedwana	None	Bhanwara Ram	Indian National Congress
Nawan	None	Harish Chand	Bharatiya Janata Party
Makrana	None	A. Aziz	Lok Dal
Parbatsar	SC	Mohan Lal	Lok Dal
Degana	None	Kalyan Singh	Janata Party
Merta	None	Nathu Ram	Lok Dal
Mundwa	None	Ramdev Beniwal	Lok Dal

== See also ==
- List of constituencies of the Rajasthan Legislative Assembly
