= Mangelal Meena =

Indian politician

Member of the Rajasthan Legislative Assembly
- Incumbent
- Assumed office December 2023
- Constituency: Rajgarh Laxmangarh

Personal details
- Party: Indian National Congress

Mangelal Meena is an Indian politician. He was elected to the 16th Rajasthan Assembly from Rajgarh Laxmangarh. He is a member of the Indian National Congress.
