= Indian Youth Congress =

Youth wing of the Indian National Congress

Indian Youth Congress (IYC)
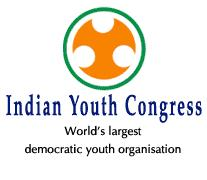
- Logo of the IYC
- President: Uday Bhanu Chib
- General Secretary: Rahul Gandhi
- Founded: 9 August 1960 (66 years ago)
- Headquarters: 5, Raisina Hill, New Delhi, Delhi, India
- Membership: 58.2million
- International affiliation: Progressive Alliance, Socialist International
- Website: iyc.in

The Indian Youth Congress is the youth wing of the Indian National Congress party. The Indian Youth Congress was a department of the Indian National Congress from the period just after the Partition of India in 1947 until the late 1960s. Then prime minister Indira Gandhi gave the Youth Congress a new dimension by establishing it as a frontal organisation of the Congress, with the objective of doing social work. Priya Ranjan Dasmunsi was the first elected president of the Indian Youth Congress who later became Minister of Broadcasting and Parliamentary Affairs in the Indian cabinet; N. D. Tiwari was the President from 1969 to 1971. Jitin Prasada was also the president of the Indian Youth Congress.

During the 1970s, under the leadership of Sanjay Gandhi, the Youth Congress undertook activities such as tree plantation, family planning, and fought against domestic violence and dowry deaths. After the death of Sanjay Gandhi, Rajiv Gandhi took over in charge of the Youth Congress. After he became prime minister in 1984, Rajiv Gandhi reduced the voting age to 18. Rahul Gandhi was appointed a general secretary of the All India Congress Committee on 24 September 2007 and was given charge of the Indian Youth Congress along with the National Students Union of India.

The Indian Youth Congress has its headquarters in New Delhi and is headed by Uday Bhanu Chib. There are 39 office bearers at the national level, followed by the state, Lok Sabha, Assembly and Booth level. In all, 174,000 committees have been formed at the Booth level.

== History ==
In the early 1970s, the Youth Congress was mostly the work of Saiyid Nurul Hasan, who served as the education minister from 1972 to 1977. The organisation's most effective unit was the West Bengal Youth Congress, where its first elected president, Priya Ranjan Dasmunsi, who transformed the unit into a full-time cadre, made it a body not to be ignored.

During the Emergency, the organisation became an important body in the use of Sanjay Gandhi. The banning of the Rashtriya Swayamsevak Sangh helped with adding members from the banned organisation.

== Role in India ==
=== UTI Scam rally protest ===
In 2001, several Youth Congress workers held Lalkar Rally around Parliament of India to protest against UTI Scam under National Democratic Alliance government and asked for resignation of then Prime Minister Atal Bihari Vajpayee.

=== Protest against violent attacks ===
In 2011, 2,500 Youth Congress activists rallied and protested in Kolkata against the violent attacks on its supporters by the All India Trinamool Congress party.

=== Tripura civil disobedience movement ===
In 2012, Tripura Pradesh Youth Congress organized civil disobedience movement in all 23 sub-divisions in Tripura as part of agitation to protest against the Left Front government's failure to provide employment, nepotism, rise of crime and atrocities against women in the state. This saw procession of 4,000 Congress workers and detainment about 25,000 Youth Congress activists across the state.

=== Madhya Pradesh memorandum ===
Kunal Choudhary is the President of Madhya Pradesh Youth Congress. In 2012, Madhya Pradesh Youth Congress president submitted a memorandum to the Governor of Madhya Pradesh demanding dismissal of the State Government run by Bharatiya Janata Party (BJP) for not able to protect teenager girls and murders.

=== Karnataka drought failure ===
In 2012, Youth Congress workers of Karnataka took out a procession in protest against the failure of the Government of Karnataka under BJP to tackle drought in 123 taluks and staged a mass protest in front of all taluk offices and locked the offices. A memorandum was submitted to Deputy Commissioner.

In January 2013, a 17 kilometer rally was held in Kannur demanding the dissolution of BJP government for 'failing' to provide good administration and losing the support of the majority.

=== India-Pakistan border protest for Indian soldiers ===
On 14 January 2013 more than hundred Youth Congress activists staged protests across India against Pakistan and its army outside the old customs gate at the Attari border over the killing of two Indian soldiers by Pakistani forces.

=== Implementation of 73rd and 74th Amendments in Jammu and Kashmir ===
In August, 2012 the Pradesh Youth Congress Jammu and Kashmir launched a statewide protest against the Government led by National Conference for the implementation of the 73rd and 74th Amendments to the Constitution of India relating to Panchayti Raj in Jammu and Kashmir. The protests were led by J&K youth Congress president Mohammad Shahnawaz Choudhary.

=== Kisaan Satyagrah against Land Acquisition Ordinance ===
In January 2015, Indian National Congress Vice President Rahul Gandhi directed nationwide protest against Land Acquisition Ordinance brought in by Indian Central government. The protest took place in various part of country. On 18 February, Indian Youth Congress protested against Vyapam Scam and Land Acquisition Ordinance near Madhya Pradesh Vidhan Sabha where they were charged with water canon in which several youth congress volunteers were hurt and arrested along with Indian Youth Congress National President Amrinder Singh Raja Warring.

=== Protests at AI summit ===
On 20 February, some members of the Indian Youth Congress (IYC) carried out protests inside the venue of India AI Impact Summit 2026 with slogans such as “PM is compromised” and the criticism of the recent trade deal between India and the US. 4 of these members were sent to police custody by the court on 22 February. While Bharatiya Janata Party condemned these protests, with its spokesperson Shehzad Poonawalla saying, ""From being anti-BJP, you have gone to being anti-national? If you have a problem with the BJP, then protest at the BJP office, Jantar Mantar, or outside the PM's office. But the people of the country and their alliance partners condemn them for their attempt to defame India in front of the entire world at the AI Summit." Congress leader Harish Rawat defended the protests, saying "it’s also a fact that AI might become a tool in the hands of a few individuals… It’s the opposition’s job to warn against that… It’s not the first time such international events have been opposed. I know how the BJP protested during the Commonwealth Games… To say that such opposition has happened for the first time is not correct. The BJP has been doing this while in the opposition."

These protestors were granted bail by the Delhi high court on 2 March.

== Presidents ==
S.no	President	Portrait	Term		Place
1	Brij Mohan Jain		1962	-	
2	Puran Singh Azad		-	-	
3	N. D. Tiwari		1969	1971	Uttarakhand
4	Priya Ranjan Dasmunsi		1971	1975	West Bengal
5	Ambika Soni		1975	1977	Lahore, British India
6	Ramchandra Rath		1978	1980	Odisha
7	Ghulam Nabi Azad		1980	1982	Jammu and Kashmir
8	Tariq Anwar		1982	1985	Bihar
9	Anand Sharma		1985	1987	Himachal Pradesh
10	Gurudas Kamat		1987	1988	Karnataka
11	Mukul Wasnik		1988	1990	Maharashtra
12	Ramesh Chennithala		1990	1993	Kerala
13	Maninderjeet Singh Bitta		1993	1996	Punjab
14	Jitin Prasada		1996	1998	Uttar Pradesh
15	Manish Tewari		1998	2000	Punjab
16	Randeep Surjewala		March 2000	February 2005	Chandigarh
17	Ashok Tanwar		February 2005	February 2010	Haryana
18	Rajeev Satav		February 2010	December 2014	Maharashtra
19	Amrinder Singh Raja Warring		December 2014	May 2018	Punjab
20	Keshav Chand Yadav		May 2018	July 2019	Uttar Pradesh
21	Srinivas B. V.		August 2019	22 September 2024	Karnataka
22	Uday Bhanu Chib		22 September 2024	Incumbent	Jammu and Kashmir

== List of Current State Presidents ==
S.no	State	President
1	Andhra Pradesh	Ramarao Lakkaraju
2	Arunachal Pradesh	Tarh Johnny
3	Assam	Zubair Anam
4	Bihar	सम्राट रिक्कू
5	Chhattisgarh	Akash Sharma
6	Goa	Joel Andred
7	Gujarat	Shri Pravinsinh Vanol
8	Haryana	Nishit Kataria
9	Himachal Pradesh	Chhater Singh
10	Jharkhand	Keshav Mahto Kamlesh
11	Karnataka	H. S. Manjunath
12	Keralam	Adv. O. J. Janeesh
13	Madhya Pradesh	Yash Ghanghoria
14	Maharashtra	Shivraj More
15	Manipur	Ningthoujam Popilal
16	Meghalaya	Adrian L Chyne Mylliem
17	Mizoram	Lalmalswama Nghaka
18	Nagaland	Lima lemtur
19	Odisha	Ranjit Patra
20	Punjab	Mohit Mohindra
21	Rajasthan	Abhimanyu Poonia
22	Sikkim	
23	Tamil Nadu	Surya Prakash
24	Telangana	Jakkidi Shiva Charan Reddy
25	Tripura	Rakhi Das
26	Uttarakhand	Sumit Bhullar
27	Uttar Pradesh	Dipak shivhare Vishal Singh Parash Sukla
28	West Bengal	Rajesh Sinha Sunny (State Incharge)
29	Andaman and Nicobar Islands	Diksha Dular
30	Chandigarh	Deepak Lubana
31	Dadra Nagar Haveli	
32	Daman and Diu	
33	Delhi	Akshay Lakra
34	Jammu and Kashmir	Akash Bhart
35	Ladakh	Aamir Hussain lone
36	Lakshadweep	Ajas Akber Puthiya Illam
37	Mumbai	Akhilesh Yadav
38	Puducherry	Anandhbabu Natarajan

== See also ==
- Indian National Congress
- National Students Union of India
