= Rajasthan Pradesh Youth Congress =

Organization

Rajasthan Youth Congress राजस्थान युवा कांग्रेस
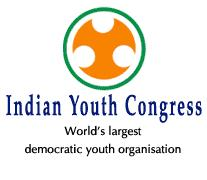
- President: Abhimanyu Poonia
- Founded: 1970
- Headquarters: 13E, Sawai Jaisingh Highway, Jaipur, Rajasthan
- Ideology: Populism; Social liberalism; Democratic socialism; Social democracy; Secularism
- Website: iyc.in

The Rajasthan Youth Congress or Rajasthan Pradesh Youth Congress is the state wing of the Indian Youth Congress, youth wing of Indian National Congress.Abhimanyu Poonia is the incumbent president of the Rajasthan Youth Congress.

== List of Presidents ==
S.no	President	Term		
1.	Ashok Chandna	28 March 2013	7 April 2020	7 years, 10 days
2.	Mukesh Bhakar	7 April 2020	14 July 2020	98 days
3.	Ganesh Ghogra	14 July 2020	3 December 2023	3 years, 142 days
4.	Abhimanyu Poonia	3 December 2023	Incumbent	1 year, 166 days
