= Mukesh Bhakar =

Indian politician

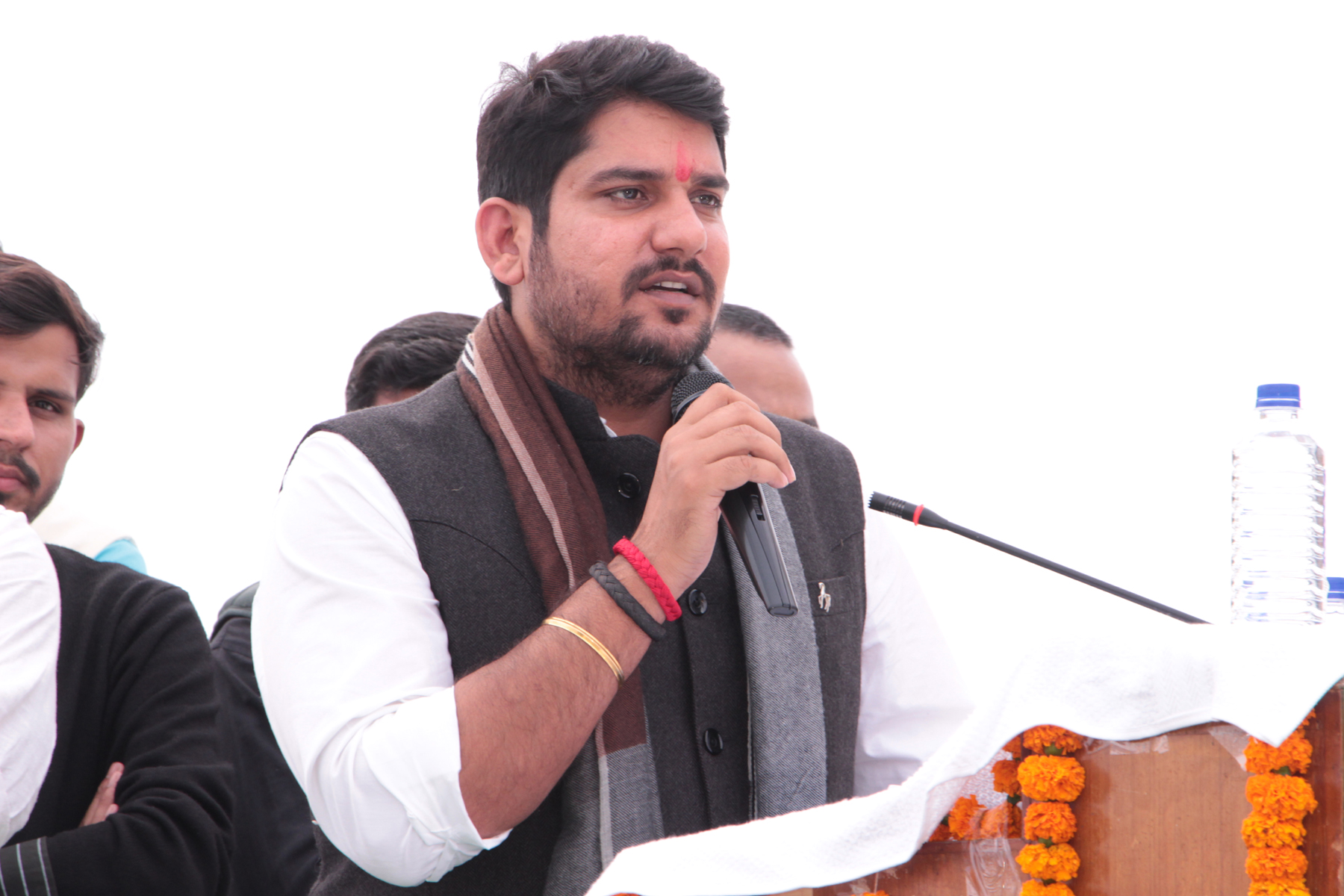

Member of the Rajasthan Legislative Assembly
- Incumbent
- Assumed office 11 December 2018
- Preceded by: Manohar Singh
- Constituency: Ladnun

State President, Rajasthan Youth Congress
- In office 7 April 2020 – 14 July 2020
- Preceded by: Ashok Chandna
- Succeeded by: Ganesh Ghogra

State President, National Student Union of India, Rajasthan
- In office 31 January 2013 – 26 May 2015

National Secretary, National Student Union of India
- In office 21 October 2015 – May 2017

Vice-President, Rajasthan Youth Congress
- In office 22 November 2017 – 6 April 2020

Personal details
- Born: 20 November 1988 (age 37) Nagaur, Rajasthan, India
- Party: Indian National Congress
- Spouse: Komal Meena (m. 2026)
- Education: Bachelor of Arts and Master of Arts
- Alma mater: University of Rajasthan

Mukesh Bhakar (born 20 November 1988) is an Indian politician from Nagaur, Rajasthan. He is the Member of the Rajasthan Legislative Assembly from Ladnun. He was president of the Rajasthan Youth Congress. He is a member of the Indian National Congress. He served as state president of the National Students Union of India from 2013 to 2015. He was elected state president of Rajasthan Shooting Ball Association.

== Early life ==
Bhakar was born on 20 November 1988 in Nagaur, Rajasthan. His father served Indian Army as a subedar. Bhakar completed his graduation and post graduation from the University of Rajasthan. He was influenced by the ideology of Bhagat Singh at a very young age and was actively engaged in social political work even as a student.

== Political life ==
In 2013, Bhakar won the election for the State President of National Students' Union of India. He successfully organised Congress's Student Wing in the state. NSUI made comeback after 12 years in the largest university in Rajasthan under his leadership. After completion of his tenure he was nominated to be the national secretary.

He contested his first election for Rajasthan Legislative assembly in 2018 for Ladnun assembly and won by a margin of 12,947 votes to his closest opponent three times MLA Thakur Manohar Singh of Bharatiya Janata Party. In February 2020, Bhakar won the election for the state president of Indian Youth Congress, Rajasthan, beating his nearest rival Amardeen by 9872 votes.

On 5 August 2024, he was suspended from the Rajasthan Legislative Assembly due to alleged indecent behaviour in the house.

== Positions held ==
Year	Position
2009-10	Unit President, National Students Union of India, University of Rajasthan
2013–15	State President, National Students Union of India, Rajasthan
2015-17	National Secretary, National Students Union of India
2017-Cont.	PCC Member, Rajasthan Pradesh Congress Committee
2017-Cont.	AICC Member, All India Congress Committee
2018-20	State Vice President, Rajasthan Youth Congress
2018-23	Member, Fifteenth Rajasthan Legislative Assembly
2018-Cont.	Member, Committee on Petitions Rajasthan Legislative Assembly
2020-20	State President, Rajasthan Youth Congress
2020-Cont.	State President, Rajasthan Shooting Ball Association
