= Chogaram Bakolia =

Indian politician

Cabinet Minister of Transport, Government of Rajasthan
- In office 1998 - 2003

Food and Civil Supplies, Consumer Affairs Minister, Government of Rajasthan
- In office 1985 - 1990

Member of the Rajasthan Legislative Assembly
- In office 1980 - 1990, 1998 - 2003
- Constituency: Reodar

Personal details
- Born: Barmer, Rajasthan, India
- Party: Indian National Congress
- Occupation: Politician

Chogaram Bakolia as an Indian politician who served as the state cabinet minister in Government of Rajasthan. He was elected to the Rajasthan Legislative Assembly representing Reodar constituency. He is a member of the Indian National Congress.
