= Ashok Chandna =

Indian politician (born 1984)

Minister Of State, Government of Rajasthan
- In office 28 December 2018 – 3 December 2023
- Chief Minister: Ashok Gahlot
- Ministry and Departments: List: *Sports & Youth Affairs (I/C); Skill (I/C) Employment & Entrepreneurship (I/C); DIPR Disaster Management & Relief Administrative Reforms & Coordination Dept.; Statistics Policy Planning
- Succeeded by: KK Vishnoi

President Rajasthan Youth Congress
- In office 28 March 2013 – 7 April 2020
- Preceded by: Position Established
- Succeeded by: Mukesh Bhakar

Member of the Rajasthan Legislative Assembly
- Incumbent
- Assumed office 8 December 2013
- Preceded by: Prabhu Lal Saini
- Constituency: Hindoli

Personal details
- Born: 13 January 1984 (age 42) Bundi, Rajasthan
- Party: Indian National Congress
- Education: (B.Com), University of Pune
- Profession: Politician and businessman

Ashok Chandna (born 13 January 1984) is an Indian politician currently serving as a member of the 16th Rajasthan Legislative Assembly, representing the Hindoli constituency. He previously served as a member of the 14th and 15th Rajasthan Legislative Assembly, representing the same constituency. Chandna is a member of the Indian National Congress party. He served as the Minister of State for the Youth Affairs & Sports Department (Independent Charge), Skill, Employment & Entrepreneurship (Independent Charge), Transport, and Soldier Welfare in the Government of Rajasthan from 2018 to 2023.

== Education and early life ==
Ashok Chandna was born on 13 January 1984 in a Gurjar family at Nainwa, Bundi. He completed his schooling from Birla Senior Secondary School, Pilani and is Graduate from University of Pune.

== Political journey ==
Ashok Chandna joined the Indian National Congress party in 2009 as a general congress worker. In the same year, he was elected as a member of the Ajmer Zila Parishad and became the General Secretary of the Rajasthan Youth Congress. Later, in 2013, he became the president of the Rajasthan Youth Congress and was elected as a member of the Rajasthan Legislative Assembly from the Hindoli constituency in October 2013. On 11 December 2018, he was re-elected and included as a Minister of State in the Third Gehlot ministry.

Following the 2023 Rajasthan Legislative Assembly election, he was re-elected as MLA from the Hindoli constituency, defeating Prabhu Lal Saini, the candidate from the Bharatiya Janata Party (BJP), by a margin of 45,004 votes.

== Sports ==
Ashok Chandna conceptualised the Rajasthan Gramin Olympics. The rural games were scheduled from 29 August to 5 October 2022, where more than 30 lakhs people registered and Rajiv Gandhi Rural Olympic Games termed as pivotal moment that will help in creating a sports culture in Rajasthan followed by other states.
