= Nanalal Ninama =

Indian politician

Nanalal Ninama (born 1954) is an Indian politician from Rajasthan. He is a member of the Rajasthan Legislative Assembly from Ghatol Assembly constituency, which is reserved for Scheduled Tribe community, in Banswara district. He won the 2023 Rajasthan Legislative Assembly election representing the Indian National Congress party.

== Early life and education ==
Ninama is from Ghatol, Banswara district, Rajasthan. He is the son of Deliya. He studied till Class 9 at the Government Higher Secondary School, Ghatol, and passed the examination in 1971. Later, he discontinued his studies.

== Career ==
Ninama won from Ghatol Assembly constituency representing the Indian National Congress in the 2023 Rajasthan Legislative Assembly election. He polled 88,335 votes and defeated his nearest rival, Ashok Kumar of the Bharat Adivasi Party, by a margin of 3,691 votes. He first became an MLA winning the 2008 Rajasthan Legislative Assembly election as an independent candidate defeating Navneet Lal by a margin of 20,622 votes. Later, he joined the Indian National Congress but lost the next two elections in 2013 and 2018 representing the Congress. He lost to Navanit Lal of the BJP in 2013 by a margin of 27,198 votes, and Harendra Ninama, also of BJP, in the 2018 Assembly election by a margin of 4,449 votes.
