= Gurdeep Singh Shahpini =

Indian politician from Rajasthan

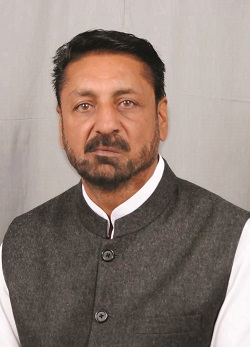

Rajasthan Legislative Assembly
- In office 11 December 2018 – December 2023
- Succeeded by: Abhimanyu Poonia
- Preceded by: Krishan Kadva
- Constituency: Sangaria

Personal details
- Born: 15 August 1963 (age 62) Shahpini, Rajasthan, India
- Party: Bharatiya Janata Party

Gurdeep Singh Shahpini is an Indian politician from the Sangaria Assembly constituency in Rajasthan. He is a member of the 15th Assembly of Rajasthan as a Bharatiya Janata Party member.

== Political career ==
Gurdeep Singh started his political career in the 2008 Rajasthan Legislative Assembly election from Sangaria constituency, losing with 28212 (20.04%) votes.

In 2013, he again contested the Rajasthan Legislative Assembly elections from Sangaria constituency in which he finished third with 40,994 (23.58%) votes.

In 2018, he again contested the Rajasthan Legislative Assembly election from Sangaria constituency, winning with 99064 (49.37%) votes.
