= Shankar Singh Rawat =

Indian politician

Member of the Rajasthan Legislative Assembly
- Constituency: Beawar
- In office 2008–2028

Personal details
- Born: 5 January 1955 (age 71) Himmatpura, Beawar
- Party: Bharatiya Janata Party
- Spouse: Kaili Devi
- Occupation: Politician

Shankar Singh Rawat is an Indian politician from the Bharatiya Janata Party and a member of the Rajasthan Legislative Assembly representing the Beawar constituency.
