= Abhimanyu Poonia =

Indian politician

Member of the Rajasthan Legislative Assembly
- Incumbent
- Assumed office 3 December 2023
- Preceded by: Gurdeep Singh Shahpini
- Constituency: Sangaria

President Rajasthan Youth Congress
- Incumbent
- Assumed office 16 December 2023
- Preceded by: Ganesh Ghogra

President, Rajasthan NSUI
- In office 2017–2020
- Succeeded by: Abhishek Chaudhary

Personal details
- Party: Indian National Congress
- Spouse: Bhawna Thapan
- Education: Master of Arts
- Alma mater: University of Rajasthan
- Occupation: Politician

Abhimanyu Poonia is an Indian politician. He was elected to the 16th Rajasthan Legislative Assembly from Sangaria. He is also president of the Rajasthan Youth Congress and member of the Indian National Congress. Previously he was state president of the National Students Union of India (NSUI) in Rajasthan from 2017 to 2020.

== Political career ==
From 2017 to 2020, Poonia was state president of the National Students Union of India (NSUI) in Rajasthan. In 2020, he resigned from this post in support of Sachin Pilot during a political crisis within the Congress party, alongside claims that 400-500 post-holders in Youth Congress, NSUI, and Seva Dal also resigned in protest.

In December 2023, Poonia won the Sangaria assembly seat, becoming a Member of the Legislative Assembly (MLA) in the 16th Rajasthan Assembly. Around the same time, he was appointed president of the Rajasthan Youth Congress, a position he continues to hold.

In June 2025, Poonia participated in a protest led by Hanuman Beniwal regarding the Udaipur doctor suicide case. On 20 June, the state government agreed to all demands made by the deceased doctor's family.
