= Udailal Dangi =

Indian politician

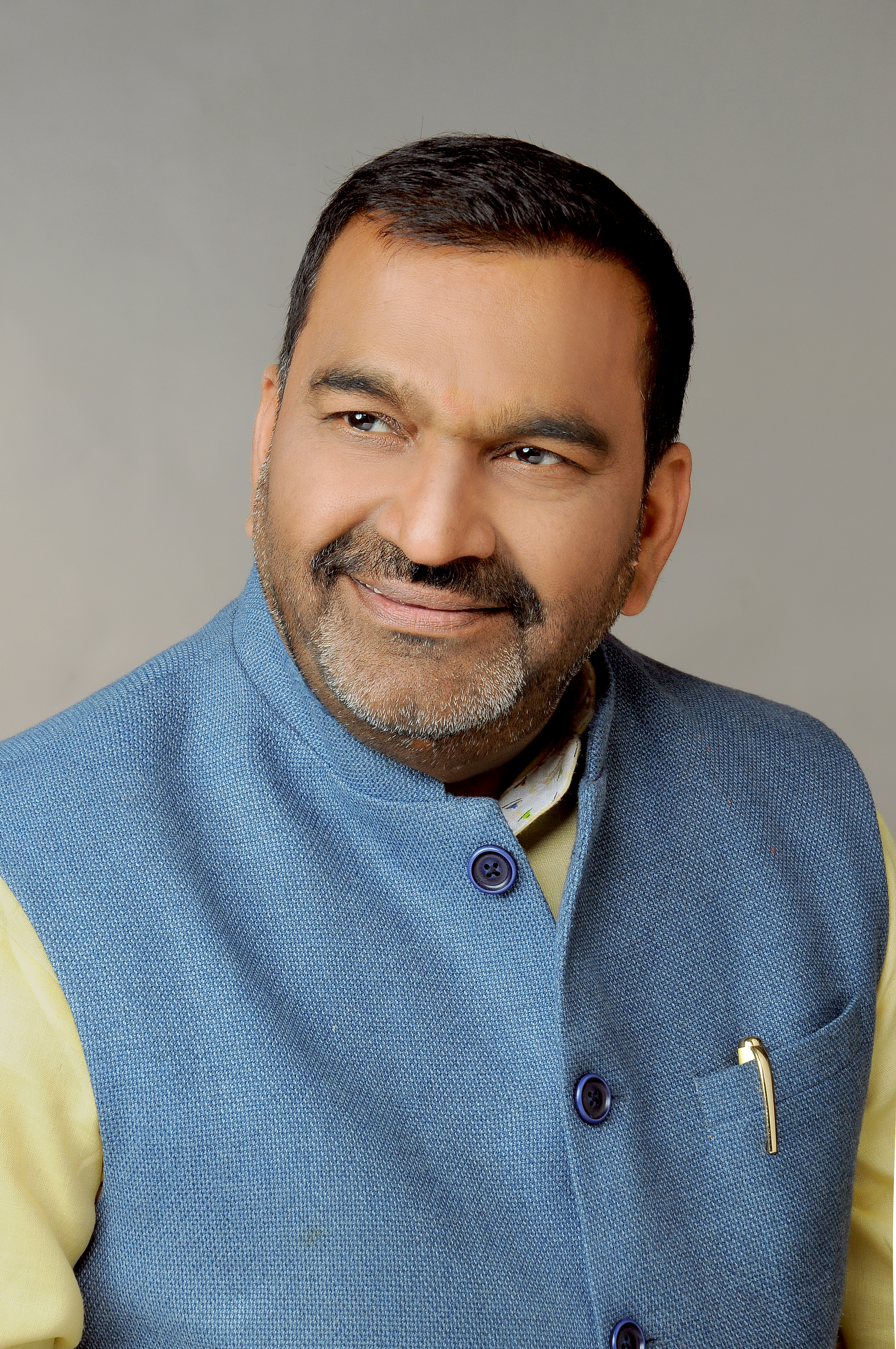

Member of the Rajasthan Legislative Assembly
- Incumbent
- Assumed office December 2023
- Constituency: Vallabhnagar

Personal details
- Born: Nandwel, Udaipur
- Party: Bharatiya Janata Party
- Occupation: Politician

Udailal Dangi is an Indian politician from the Bharatiya Janata Party and a member of the Rajasthan Legislative Assembly representing the Vallabhnagar Vidhan Sabha constituency of Rajasthan.
