= Vidhan Bhavan, Jaipur =

Seat of the Rajasthan Legislative Assembly

Vidhan Bhavan
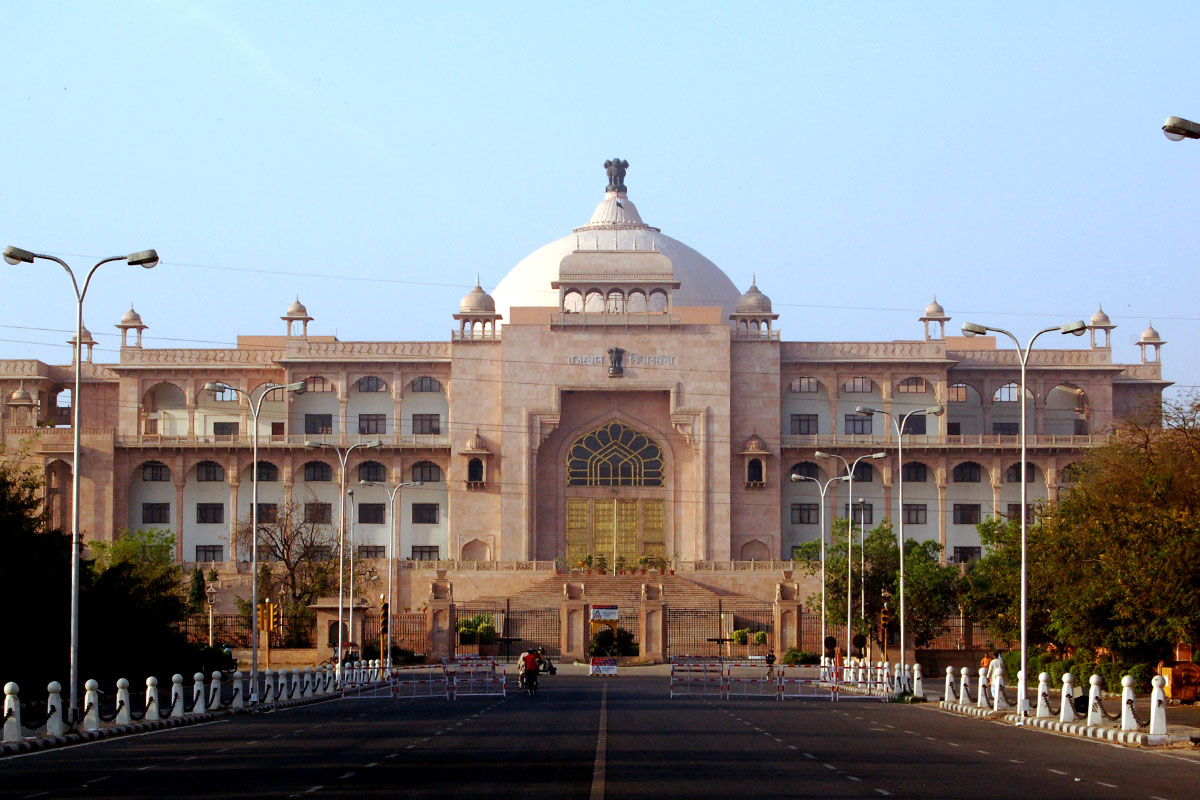
- Interactive map of the Vidhan Bhavan area

General information
- Type: Legislature complex
- Location: Pankaj Singhvi Marg, Jyothi Nagar, Lalkothi, Jaipur, Rajasthan, Jaipur, India
- Coordinates: 26.8921714°N 75.7976895°E
- Construction started: November 1994; 31 years ago
- Completed: March 2001; 25 years ago

Height
- Height: 44 m (144 ft)

Technical details
- Floor count: 8
- Floor area: 56,485 m^{2} (608,000 sq ft)
- Grounds: 16.96 acres (6.86 ha)

Other information
- Seating capacity: 260

Website
- assembly.rajasthan.gov.in

The Vidhan Bhavan is the seat of the Rajasthan Legislative Assembly. It is one of the most modern legislature complexes in India. It is situated in Jyoti Nagar, Jaipur the capital of the state.

== History ==
From 1952 to 2000, the Sawai Man Singh Town Hall was the seat of the Rajasthan Legislative Assembly. The 5th session of the 11th Legislative Assembly was the last session, held in Sawai Man Singh Town Hall on 6 November 2000. Work on this project commenced in November 1994 and was completed in March 2001.

== Description ==
The exterior of the building has been provided with famous traditional features of Rajasthan such as Jharokhas, Chhatries, Kamani, Baradaries, Arches, Todies, etc. The interior entrance lounges have been decorated in the famous Rajasthani traditional art on walls and ceilings representing the traditional art of four regions of Jaipur, Shekhawati, Marwar, and Mewar.

The building is an eight-storied frame structure with a height of 145 feet and a floor area of 6.08 lac sqft. The main dome has a diameter of 104 feet. The assembly hall has a seating capacity for 260 members and a hall of identical capacity over it at the fifth floor for the future Vidhan Parishad (Upper House).

The building has four entry gates in the North, South, East, and West directions. Each gate represents a different style of Rajasthani culture.
