= Surendra Singh Rathore =

Indian politician

- सुरेंद्र सिंह राठौर

Member of Rajasthan Legislative Assembly
- Incumbent
- Assumed office 2023
- Preceded by: Yogendra Singh Parmar
- Constituency: Kumbhalgarh

Personal details
- Born: 1 June 1963 (age 62)
- Party: Bhartiya Janta Party
- Occupation: Politician

Surendra Singh Rathore (born 1 June 1963) is an Indian politician currently serving as a member of the 16th Rajasthan Legislative Assembly. He represents the Kumbhalgarh Assembly constituency as a member of the Bharatiya Janata Party (BJP).

== Political career ==
Following the 2023 Rajasthan Legislative Assembly election, he was elected as an MLA from Kumbhalgarh, defeating Yogendra Singh Parmar, the candidate from the Indian National Congress (INC), by a margin of 22,060.
