= Sangaria Assembly constituency =

Constituency of the Rajasthan legislative assembly in India

Coordinates: 29.78°N 74.46°E

Sangaria
- Constituency No. 7 for the Rajasthan Legislative Assembly

Constituency details
- Country: India
- Region: North India
- State: Rajasthan
- District: Hanumangarh district
- Established: 1967
- Reservation: None

Member of Legislative Assembly
- 16th Rajasthan Legislative Assembly
- Incumbent Abhimanyu Poonia
- Party: Indian National Congress

Sangaria Assembly constituency is one of constituencies of Rajasthan Legislative Assembly in the Ganganagar Lok Sabha constituency.

Sangaria Constituency covers all voters from Sangaria tehsil and Tibbi tehsil.

== Members of Assembly ==
Rajasthan Legislative Assembly
Year	Name	Party
1967	Birbal	Indian National Congress
1972	Birbal	Indian National Congress
1977	Ram Chander	Indian National Congress
1980	Mahinder Singh	Indian National Congress
1985	Krishan Chander Bishnoi	Indian National Congress
1990	Het Ram Beniwal	Communist Party of India
1993	Gurjant Singh	Independent
1998	Krishan Chander Bishnoi	Indian National Congress
2003	Gurjant Singh	Bharatiya Janata Party
2008	Param Navdeep	Indian National Congress
2013	Krishan Kadva	Bharatiya Janta Party
2018	Gurdeep Singh Shahpini	Bharatiya Janta Party
2023	Abhimanyu Poonia	Indian National Congress

== Election results ==
=== 2023 ===
2023 Rajasthan Legislative Assembly election: Sangaria
Party	Candidate	Votes	%	±%
INC	Abhimanyu Poonia	98,341	47.4	+1.29
BJP	Gurdeep Singh Shahpini	56,331	27.15	−22.22
Independent	Gulab Sinwar	40,266	19.41	
ASP(KR)	Param Navdeep Singh	3,036	1.46	
Independent	Jagjeet Singh	2,232	1.08	
NOTA	None of the above	1,765	0.85	−0.09
Majority		42,010	20.25	+16.99
Turnout		207,478	84.3	−2.79
INC gain from BJP		Swing		

=== 2018 ===
2018 Rajasthan Legislative Assembly election: Sangaria
Party	Candidate	Votes	%	±%
BJP	Gurdeep Singh	99,064	49.37	
INC	Shabnam Godara	92,526	46.11	
BSP	Balvir Singh	2,863	1.43	
Independent	Rupendra Singh	2,063	1.03	
NOTA	None of the above	1,891	0.94	
Majority		6,538	3.26	
Turnout		200,650	87.09	
BJP gain from		Swing		

== See also ==
- Member of the Legislative Assembly (India)
