= Ramswaroop Lamba =

Indian politician

Ramswaroop Lamba is an Indian politician from the Bharatiya Janata Party and a member of the Rajasthan Legislative Assembly representing the Nasirabad Vidhan Sabha constituency of Rajasthan.

Father :- Pr. Sanwarlal jat (Minister of B.J.P. from Rajasthan)

District president of national hockey team
