= Pushpendra Singh =

Indian politician

Pushpendra Singh (born 18 May 1970) is an Indian politician who was a Minister in the BJP led Rajasthan Government. He is a member of the Rajasthan Legislative Assembly elected from Bali (Rajasthan Assembly constituency) in Pali district in Rajasthan state. He has won all of the assembly elections in this district since 2002, winning his sixth term in 2023. He has been elected on the ticket of the Bharatiya Janata Party.

== Family ==
Pushpendra Singh was born on 18 May 1970 in Rajasthan. His father was the late Narendra Singh.

== Education ==
He completed graduation from Maharaja Sayajirao University of Baroda. He also has a degree in Philosophy.

== Political life ==
At a young age (29), Singh was elected as pradhan. Following that, he is elected six times as a member of the Rajasthan Legislative Assembly.

- 1993 elected as President Gram Seva Sehkari Samiti.
- 2000 to 2002 - 13 February 2014, elected as pradhan, Bali Panchyat Samiti.
- 2002 to 2003 - elected as MLA from Bali seat by election in 2002 after Bhairon Singh Shekhawat became vice President of India
- 2003 to 2008 - elected as MLA from Bali seat in Rajasthan Legislative Assembly election, 2003
- 2008 to 2013 - elected as MLA from Bali seat 2008 Rajasthan Legislative Assembly election
- 2013 to 2018 - elected as MLA from Bali seat 2013 Rajasthan Legislative Assembly election and was appointed Energy & Law Minister in Rajasthan Cabinet of Mrs. Vasundhara Raje Scindhia.
- 2014 - 2015 Member, Committee on Estimates "B" (2014-2015)
- 2014 - 2015 Member, Business Advisory Committee (2014-2015)
- 2018 to 2023 - elected as MLA from Bali seat 2018 Rajasthan Legislative Assembly election
- 2023 to present - elected as MLA from Bali seat 2023 Rajasthan Legislative Assembly election

== See also ==
- List of ministers in Government of Rajasthan
