= Ganesh Ghogra =

Indian politician

Member of the Rajasthan Legislative Assembly
- Incumbent
- Assumed office December 2018
- Preceded by: Devendra Katara
- Constituency: Dungarpur

President Rajasthan Youth Congress
- In office 14 July 2020 – 3 December 2023
- Preceded by: Mukesh Bhakar
- Succeeded by: Abhimanyu Poonia

Personal details
- Party: Indian National Congress
- Spouse: Jamna Ghogra (m. 2000)
- Occupation: Politician

Ganesh Ghogra is an Indian politician. He was elected to the Rajasthan Legislative Assembly representing Dungarpur constituency. He previously served as president of the Rajasthan Youth Congress from 2020 to 2023.
