= Hindoli Assembly constituency =

Legislative Assembly constituency in Rajasthan State, India

Coordinates: 25.58°N 75.5°E

Hindoli
- Constituency No. 184 for the Rajasthan Legislative Assembly

Constituency details
- Country: India
- Region: North India
- State: Rajasthan
- District: Bundi
- Lok Sabha constituency: Bhilwara
- Established: 2008
- Total electors: 273,581
- Reservation: None

Member of Legislative Assembly
- 16th Rajasthan Legislative Assembly
- Incumbent Ashok Chandna
- Party: Indian National Congress
- Elected year: 2023

Hindoli Assembly constituency is one of the 200 Legislative Assembly constituencies of Rajasthan state in India. Hindoli assembly constituency is considered as gurjar dominant. And the number of gurjar voters in this seat is around 65 thousand.

It comprises Hindoli tehsil, and parts of Nainwa tehsil, both in Bundi district. As of 2023, it is represented by Ashok Chandna of the Indian National Congress party.

== Members of the Legislative Assembly ==
Election	Name	Party
2008	Prabhu Lal Saini	Bharatiya Janata Party
2013	Ashok Chandna	Indian National Congress
2018	Ashok Chandna	Indian National Congress
2023	Ashok Chandna	Indian National Congress

== Election results ==
=== 2023 ===
2023 Rajasthan Legislative Assembly election: Hindoli
Party	Candidate	Votes	%	±%
INC	Ashok Chandna	127,354	56.6	+1.24
BJP	Prabhu Lal Saini	82,350	36.6	−3.38
ASP(KR)	Rama Lakhan	9,312	4.14	
NOTA	None of the above	2,861	1.27	−0.71
Majority		45,004	20.0	+4.62
Turnout		224,991	82.24	+2.1
INC hold		Swing		

=== 2018 ===
Rajasthan Legislative Assembly Election, 2018: Hindoli
Party	Candidate	Votes	%	±%
INC	Ashok Chandna	109,958	55.36	
BJP	Omendra Singh Hada	79,417	39.98	
NOTA	None of the above	3,937	1.98	
Majority		30,541	15.38	
Turnout		198,621	80.14	

== See also ==
- List of constituencies of the Rajasthan Legislative Assembly
- Bundi district
