= Kherwara Assembly constituency =

Legislative Assembly constituency in Rajasthan State, India

Coordinates: 23.99°N 73.6°E

Kherwara
- Constituency No. 151 for the Rajasthan Legislative Assembly

Constituency details
- Country: India
- Region: North India
- State: Rajasthan
- District: Udaipur
- Lok Sabha constituency: Udaipur
- Established: 1977
- Total electors: 297,710
- Reservation: ST

Member of Legislative Assembly
- 16th Rajasthan Legislative Assembly
- Incumbent Dayaram Parmar
- Party: Indian National Congress
- Elected year: 2023

Kherwara Assembly constituency is one of the 200 Legislative Assembly constituencies of Rajasthan state in India.

It is part of Udaipur district and is reserved for candidates belonging to the Scheduled Tribes.

== Members of the Legislative Assembly ==
Year	Name	Party
2003	Nana Lal Ahari	Bharatiya Janata Party
2008	Dayaram Parmar	Indian National Congress
2013	Nana Lal Ahari	Bharatiya Janata Party
2018	Dayaram Parmar	Indian National Congress
2023	Dayaram Parmar	Indian National Congress

== Election results ==
=== 2023 ===
2023 Rajasthan Legislative Assembly election: Kherwara
Party	Candidate	Votes	%	±%
INC	Dayaram Parmar	77,342	35.29	−13.16
BJP	Nana Lal Ahari	60,098	27.42	−8.03
BTP	Praveen Kumar Parmar	53,290	24.31	+13.71
BAP	Vinod Kumar Meena	16,189	7.39	
AAP	Gautam Parmar	2,816	1.28	+0.13
NOTA	None of the above	3,265	1.49	−1.58
Majority		17,244	7.87	−5.13
Turnout		219,178	73.62	+2.16
INC hold		Swing		

=== 2018 ===
Rajasthan Legislative Assembly Election, 2018: Kherwara
Party	Candidate	Votes	%	±%
INC	Dayaram Parmar	93,155	48.45	
BJP	Nanalal Ahari	68,164	35.45	
BTP	Praveen Kumar Parmar	20,383	10.6	
BSP	Savita	2,470	1.28	
AAP	Savita Parmar	2,206	1.15	
NOTA	None of the above	5,899	3.07	
Majority		24,991	13.0	
Turnout		192,277	71.46	

== See also ==
- List of constituencies of the Rajasthan Legislative Assembly
- Udaipur district
