= Beawar Assembly constituency =

Legislative Assembly constituency in Rajasthan State, India

Coordinates: 26.11°N 74.33°E

Beawar
- Constituency No. 103 for the Rajasthan Legislative Assembly

Constituency details
- Country: India
- Region: North India
- State: Rajasthan
- District: Beawar
- Lok Sabha constituency: Rajsamand
- Established: 1972
- Total electors: 258,434
- Reservation: None

Member of Legislative Assembly
- 16th Rajasthan Legislative Assembly
- Incumbent Shankar Singh Rawat
- Party: Bharatiya Janata Party

Beawar Assembly constituency is one of the 200 Legislative Assembly constituencies of Rajasthan state in India.

It comprises Beawar tehsil, in Beawar district. As of 2023, its representative is Shankar Singh Rawat of the Bharatiya Janata Party.

== Members of the Legislative Assembly ==
| Election | Name | Party |
|---|---|---|
| 2008 | Shankar Singh Rawat | Bharatiya Janata Party |
| 2013 | Shankar Singh Rawat | Bharatiya Janata Party |
| 2018 | Shankar Singh Rawat | Bharatiya Janata Party |
| 2023 | Shankar Singh Rawat | Bharatiya Janata Party |

== Election results ==
=== 2023 ===
2023 Rajasthan Legislative Assembly election: Beawar
| Party | Candidate | Votes | % | ±% |
|---|---|---|---|---|
| BJP | Shankersingh Rawat | 67,623 | 37.21 | −5.28 |
| INC | Parasmal Jain (Panch) | 58,745 | 32.33 | −7.42 |
| Independent | Inder Singh Bagawas | 28,343 | 15.6 | |
| Independent | Mahendra Singh Rawat | 11,599 | 6.38 | |
| Independent | Manoj Chouhan | 7,940 | 4.37 | |
| Rashtriya Vyapari Party | Satyanarayan Paldiya | 2,708 | 1.49 | |
| NOTA | None of the above | 1,771 | 0.97 | −0.31 |
| Majority | | 8,878 | 4.88 | +2.14 |
| Turnout | | 181,730 | 70.32 | +3.09 |
| BJP hold | | Swing | | |

=== 2018 ===
Rajasthan Legislative Assembly Election, 2018: Beawar
| Party | Candidate | Votes | % | ±% |
|---|---|---|---|---|
| BJP | Shankar Singh | 69,932 | 42.49 | |
| INC | Parasmal Jain | 65,430 | 39.75 | |
| Independent | Devendra Singh Chouhan | 18,674 | 11.35 | |
| Independent | Abhishek Singh | 2,828 | 1.72 | |
| NOTA | None of the above | 2,114 | 1.28 | |
| Majority | | 4,502 | 2.74 | |
| Turnout | | 164,593 | 67.23 | |
| BJP hold | | Swing | | |

== See also ==
- List of constituencies of the Rajasthan Legislative Assembly
- Ajmer district
