= Dungarpur Assembly constituency =

Legislative Assembly constituency in Rajasthan State, India

Coordinates: 23.85°N 73.72°E

Dungarpur
- Constituency No. 158 for the Rajasthan Legislative Assembly

Constituency details
- Country: India
- Region: North India
- State: Rajasthan
- District: Dungarpur
- Lok Sabha constituency: Banswara
- Established: 1972
- Total electors: 263,301
- Reservation: ST

Member of Legislative Assembly
- 16th Rajasthan Legislative Assembly
- Incumbent Ganesh Ghogra
- Party: Indian National Congress

Dungarpur Assembly constituency is one of the 200 Legislative Assembly constituencies of Rajasthan state in India.

It is part of Dungarpur district and is reserved for candidates belonging to the Scheduled Tribes. As of 2023, it is represented by Ganesh Ghogra of the Indian National Congress party.

== Members of the Legislative Assembly ==
Year	Name	Party
2003	Nathu Ram Ahari	Indian National Congress
2008	Lal Shanker Gatiya	Indian National Congress
2013	Devendra Katara	Bharatiya Janata Party
2018	Ganesh Ghogra	Indian National Congress
2023	Ganesh Ghogra	Indian National Congress

== Election results ==
=== 2023 ===
2023 Rajasthan Legislative Assembly election: Dungarpur
Party	Candidate	Votes	%	±%
INC	Ganesh Ghogra	69,338	35.79	−10.55
BAP	Kantilal Roat	50,285	25.95	
BJP	Banshilal Katara	45,602	23.54	−5.67
Independent	Devram Roat	16,165	8.34	
AAP	Devendra Katara	2,348	1.21	
CPI(M)	Gotamlal	2,318	1.2	−3.49
NOTA	None of the above	4,266	2.2	−0.7
Majority		19,053	9.84	−7.29
Turnout		193,756	73.59	+2.51
INC hold		Swing		

=== 2018 ===
Rajasthan Legislative Assembly Election, 2018: Dungarpur
Party	Candidate	Votes	%	±%
INC	Ganesh Ghogra	75,482	46.34	
BJP	Madhavlal Varahat	47,584	29.21	
BTP	Velaram	13,004	7.98	
Independent	Devendra Katara	8,633	5.3	
CPI(M)	Gotamlal	7,644	4.69	
BSP	Amrutlal	3,464	2.13	
All India Hindustan Congress Party	Maya	2,367	1.45	
NOTA	None of the above	4,720	2.9	
Majority		27,898	17.13	
Turnout		162,898	71.08	

== See also ==
- List of constituencies of the Rajasthan Legislative Assembly
- Dungarpur district
