= Ghatol Assembly constituency =

Legislative Assembly constituency in Rajasthan State, India

Coordinates: 23.76°N 74.41°E

Ghatol
- Constituency No. 162 for the Rajasthan Legislative Assembly

Constituency details
- Country: India
- Region: North India
- State: Rajasthan
- District: Banswara
- Lok Sabha constituency: Banswara
- Established: 1977
- Total electors: 281,420
- Reservation: ST

Member of Legislative Assembly
- 16th Rajasthan Legislative Assembly
- Incumbent Nanalal Ninama
- Party: Indian National Congress
- Elected year: 2023

Ghatol Assembly constituency is one of the 200 Legislative Assembly constituencies of Rajasthan state in India. It is a part of Banswara Lok Sabha constituency. It comprises Ghatol tehsil in Banswara district, and is reserved for candidates belonging to the Scheduled Tribes. As of 2023, it is represented by Nanalal Ninama of the Indian National Congress.

== Members of the Legislative Assembly ==
Year	Name	Party
2003	Navneetlal Ninama	Bharatiya Janata Party
2008	Nanalal Ninama	Independent
2013	Navanit Lal	Bharatiya Janata Party
2018	Harendra Ninama	Bharatiya Janata Party
2023	Nanalal Ninama	Indian National Congress

== Election results ==
=== 2023 ===
2023 Rajasthan Legislative Assembly election: Ghatol
Party	Candidate	Votes	%	±%
INC	Nanalal Ninama	88,335	36.57	−7.72
BAP	Ashok Kumar	84,644	35.04	
BJP	Manshankar Ninama	55,537	22.99	−23.34
AAP	Narayan Lal	3,935	1.63	
NOTA	None of the above	4,087	1.69	−0.54
Majority		3,691	1.53	−0.51
Turnout		241,576	85.84	+0.41
INC gain from BJP		Swing		

=== 2018 ===
2018 Rajasthan Legislative Assembly election: Ghatol
Party	Candidate	Votes	%	±%
BJP	Harendra Ninama	101,121	46.33	
INC	Nanalal Ninama	96,672	44.29	
BTP	Naresh Kumar	4,660	2.14	
Independent	Navneet Lal Ninama	3,899	1.79	
BSP	Lakshaman	3,135	1.44	
NOTA	None of the above	4,857	2.23	
Majority		4,449	2.04	
Turnout		218,263	85.43	

== See also ==
- List of constituencies of the Rajasthan Legislative Assembly
- Banswara district
