= Ladnun Assembly constituency =

Legislative Assembly constituency in Rajasthan State, India

Coordinates: 27.64°N 74.39°E

Ladnun
- Constituency No. 106 for the Rajasthan Legislative Assembly

Constituency details
- Country: India
- Region: North India
- State: Rajasthan
- District: Didwana Kuchaman
- Lok Sabha constituency: Nagaur
- Established: 2008
- Total electors: 269,255
- Reservation: None

Member of Legislative Assembly
- 16th Rajasthan Legislative Assembly
- Incumbent Mukesh Bhakar
- Party: Indian National Congress
- Elected year: 2023

Ladnun Assembly constituency is one of the 200 Legislative Assembly constituencies of Rajasthan state in India.

== Members of the Legislative Assembly ==
Year	Member	Party
2008	Hajiram Burdak	Independent politician
2013	Manohar Singh	Bharatiya Janata Party
2018	Mukesh Bhakar	Indian National Congress
2023	Mukesh Bhakar	Indian National Congress

== Election results ==
=== 2023 ===
Rajasthan Legislative Assembly Election, 2023: Ladnun
Party	Candidate	Votes	%	±%
INC	Mukesh Bhakar	97,229	50.19	+10.89
BJP	Karni Singh	81,275	41.95	+10.47
BSP	Niyaj Mohammad Khan	7,225	3.73	+1.39
CPI(M)	Bhagirath Mal	5,512	2.85	
NOTA	None of the above	2,499	1.29	+0.47
Majority		15,954	8.24	+0.42
Turnout		193,740	71.95	+1.96
INC hold		Swing		

=== 2018 ===
Rajasthan Legislative Assembly Election, 2018: Ladnun
Party	Candidate	Votes	%	±%
INC	Mukesh Bhakar	65,041	39.3	
BJP	Manohar Singh	52,094	31.48	
RLP	Jagannath Burdak	20,063	12.12	
Independent	Omprakash Bagra	7,568	4.57	
Independent	Tasleem Aaref	6,777	4.1	
BSP	Narendra Singh	3,876	2.34	
Independent	Sagar Mal Nahata	2,696	1.63	
NOTA	None of the above	1,356	0.82	
Majority		12,947	7.82	
Turnout		165,479	69.99	

== See also ==
- List of constituencies of the Rajasthan Legislative Assembly
- Nagaur district
