= 2023 Rajasthan Legislative Assembly election =

Election in Indian state

- 25 November 2023 (199 seats); 5 January 2024 (1 seat)

All 200 seats in the Rajasthan Legislative Assembly 101 seats needed for a majority
- Opinion polls
- Turnout: 75.33% (▲0.61 pp)
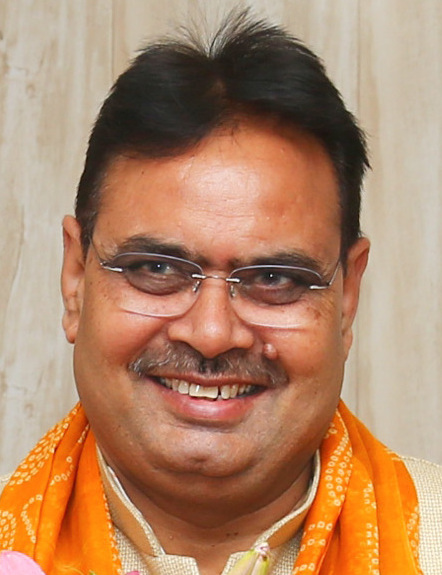

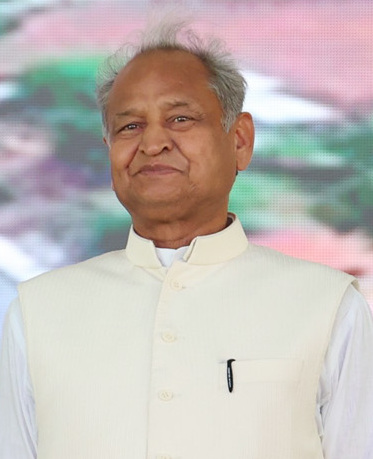
	Majority party	Minority party	Third party
Leader	Bhajan Lal Sharma (Note: BJP did not name any chief ministerial candidate for the election. Sharma's name was announced as chief minister after the elections.)	Ashok Gehlot	Rajkumar Roat
Party	BJP	INC	Bharat Aadivasi Party
Leader since	2023	1998	2019
Leader's seat	Sanganer	Sardarpura	Chourasi
Last election	38.08%, 73 seats	39.30%, 100 seats
Seats won	115	70	3
Seat change	▲42	▼30	▲3
Popular vote	16,524,787	15,880,001	929,829
Percentage	41.69%	39.55%	2.33%
Swing	▲3.61 pp	▲0.23 pp	▲2.33 pp
- Seatwise map of the election results

- Structure of the Rajasthan Legislative Assembly after the election

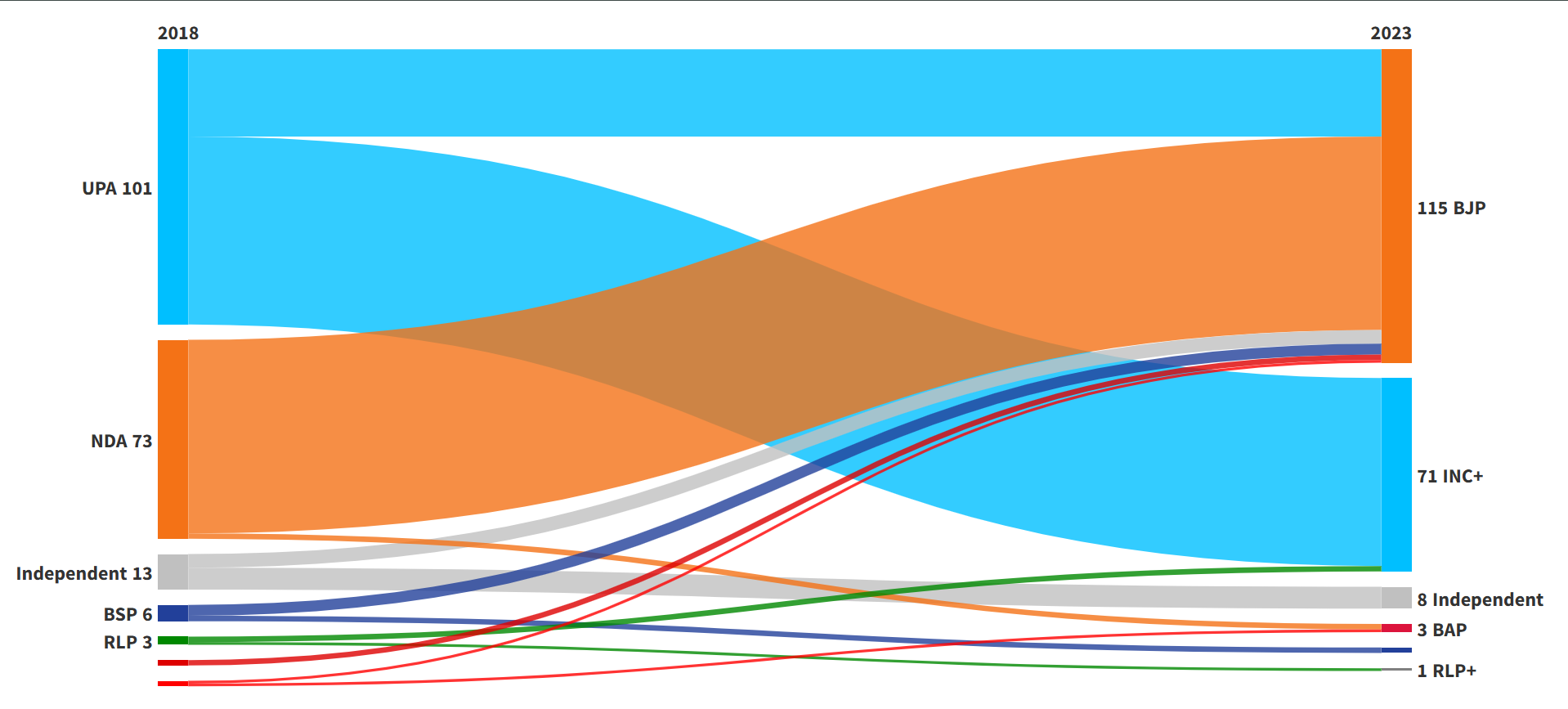
- Sankey Diagram of 2023 elections in comparision to 2018 elections
Chief Minister before election
Ashok Gehlot
INC
Chief Minister after election
Bhajan Lal Sharma
BJP

Legislative Assembly elections were held in Rajasthan on 25 November 2023 to elect 199 of the 200 members of Rajasthan Legislative Assembly. The results were declared on 3 December 2023. The election for the Karanpur seat was adjourned following the death of Rajasthan PCC candidate Gurmeet Singh Kooner.

The BJP Rajasthan wrested power by winning 115 seats, unseating the Indian National Congress from power and continuing the trend of governments changing every five years in the state. Bhajan Lal Sharma became the Chief Minister of Rajasthan.

== Background ==
The tenure of Rajasthan Legislative Assembly is scheduled to end on 14 January 2024. The previous assembly elections were held in December 2018. After the election, Indian National Congress formed the state government, with Ashok Gehlot becoming Chief Minister.

== Schedule ==
The schedule of the election was announced by the Election Commission of India on 9 October 2023. However, the election date was postponed from 23 November 2023 to 25 November 2023.

Poll event	Date	Day
Notification date	30 October 2023	Monday
Start of nomination	30 October 2023	Monday
Last date for filing nomination	6 November 2023	Monday
Scrutiny of nomination	7 November 2023	Tuesday
Last date for withdrawal of nomination	9 November 2023	Thursday
Date of poll	25 November 2023	Saturday
Date of Counting of Votes	3 December 2023	Sunday

== Parties and alliances ==
Alliance/Party		Flag	Symbol	Leader	Seats Contested	
INC+	Indian National Congress			Ashok Gehlot	198	199
INC+	Rashtriya Lok Dal			Krishan Kumar Saran	1	199
Bharatiya Janata Party				Rajendra Singh Rathore	199	
Bahujan Samaj Party				Bhagwan Singh Baba	184	
RLP+	Rashtriya Loktantrik Party			Hanuman Beniwal	78	126
RLP+	Azad Samaj Party (Kanshi Ram)			Chandra Shekhar Aazad	46	126
Aam Aadmi Party				Naveen Paliwal	85	
Jannayak Janata Party				Prithvi Meel	20	
Communist Party of India (Marxist)				Amra Ram	17	
Bharatiya Tribal Party				Chhotubhai Vasava	17	
All India Majlis-e-Ittehadul Muslimeen				Jameel Khan	10	
Communist Party of India				Narendra Acharya	9	
Lok Janshakti Party (Ram Vilas)				Suraj Kumar Burhadia	9	
Samajwadi Party				Braj Nandan Yadav	5	
Bharat Adivasi Party				Mohan Lal Roat	27	
62 REGISTERED (UNRECOGNISED) PARTIES						
Independent						

== Candidates ==
District	Constituency					
District	Constituency		INC+		BJP	
Sri Ganganagar	1	Sadulshahar	INC	Jagdish Chander Jangod	BJP	Gurveer Singh Brar
Sri Ganganagar	2	Ganganagar	INC	Ankur Manglani	BJP	Jaydeep Bihani
Sri Ganganagar	3	Karanpur	INC	Rupinder Singh Kooner	BJP	Surender Pal Singh
Sri Ganganagar	4	Suratgarh	INC	Dungar Ram Gedar	BJP	Rampratap Kasniyan
Sri Ganganagar	5	Raisinghnagar (SC)	INC	Sohan Lal Nayak	BJP	Balvir Singh Luthra
Sri Ganganagar	6	Anupgarh (SC)	INC	Shimla Devi Nayak	BJP	Santosh Bawri
Hanumangarh	7	Sangaria	INC	Abhimanyu Poonia	BJP	Gurdeep Singh Shahpini
Hanumangarh	8	Hanumangarh	INC	Vinod Kumar Choudhary	BJP	Amit Choudhary
Hanumangarh	9	Pilibanga (SC)	INC	Vinod Gothwal	BJP	Dharmendra Mochi
Hanumangarh	10	Nohar	INC	Amit Chachan	BJP	Abhishek Matoria
Hanumangarh	11	Bhadra	INC	Ajeet Beniwal	BJP	Sanjeev Beniwal
Bikaner	12	Khajuwala (SC)	INC	Govind Ram Meghwal	BJP	Vishwanath Meghwal
Bikaner	13	Bikaner West	INC	Bulaki Das Kalla	BJP	Jethanand Vyas
Bikaner	14	Bikaner East	INC	Yashpal Gehlot	BJP	Sidhi Kumari
Bikaner	15	Kolayat	INC	Bhanwar Singh Bhati	BJP	Anshuman Singh Bhati
Bikaner	16	Lunkaransar	INC	Rajendra Moond	BJP	Sumit Godara
Bikaner	17	Dungargarh	INC	Manglaram Godara	BJP	Tarachand Saraswat
Bikaner	18	Nokha	INC	Sushila Dudi	BJP	Bihari Lal Bishnoi
Churu	19	Sadulpur	INC	Krishna Poonia	BJP	Sumitra Poonia
Churu	20	Taranagar	INC	Narendra Budania	BJP	Rajendra Singh Rathore
Churu	21	Sardarshahar	INC	Anil Kumar Sharma	BJP	Rajkumar Rinva
Churu	22	Churu	INC	Rafiq Mandelia	BJP	Harlal Saharan
Churu	23	Ratangarh	INC	Poosaram Godara	BJP	Abhinesh Maharshi
Churu	24	Sujangarh (SC)	INC	Manoj Meghwal	BJP	Santosh Meghwal
Jhunjhunu	25	Pilani (SC)	INC	Pitram Singh Kala	BJP	Rajesh Dahiya
Jhunjhunu	26	Surajgarh	INC	Sharwan Kumar	BJP	Santosh Ahlawat
Jhunjhunu	27	Jhunjhunu	INC	Brijendra Singh Ola	BJP	Bablu Chaudhary
Jhunjhunu	28	Mandawa	INC	Rita Choudhary	BJP	Narendra Kumar
Jhunjhunu	29	Nawalgarh	INC	Rajkumar Sharma	BJP	Vikram Singh Jakhal
Jhunjhunu	30	Udaipurwati	INC	Bhagawana Ram Saini	BJP	Shubhkaran Choudhary
Jhunjhunu	31	Khetri	INC	Manisha Gurjar	BJP	Dharmpal Gurjar
Sikar	32	Fatehpur	INC	Hakam Ali Khan	BJP	Shravan Choudhary
Sikar	33	Lachhmangarh	INC	Govind Singh Dotasra	BJP	Subhash Maharia
Sikar	34	Dhod (SC)	INC	Jagdish Danodia	BJP	Gordhan Verma
Sikar	35	Sikar	INC	Rajendra Pareek	BJP	Ratan Lal Jaldhari
Sikar	36	Dantaramgarh	INC	Virendra Singh	BJP	Gajanand Kumawat
Sikar	37	Khandela	INC	Mahadeo Singh Khandela	BJP	Subhash Meel
Sikar	38	Neem Ka Thana	INC	Suresh Modi	BJP	Prem Singh Bajor
Sikar	39	Srimadhopur	INC	Deependra Singh Shekhawat	BJP	Jhabar Singh Kharra
Jaipur	40	Kotputli	INC	Rajender Singh Yadav	BJP	Hansraj Patel Gurjar
Jaipur	41	Viratnagar	INC	Indraj Singh Gurjar	BJP	Kuldeep Dhankad
Jaipur	42	Shahpura	INC	Manish Yadav	BJP	Upen Yadav
Jaipur	43	Chomu	INC	Shikha Meel Barala	BJP	Ram Lal Sharma
Jaipur	44	Phulera	INC	Vidyadhar Singh Chaudhary	BJP	Nirmal Kumawat
Jaipur	45	Dudu (SC)	INC	Babulal Nagar	BJP	Prem Chand Bairwa
Jaipur	46	Jhotwara	INC	Abhishek Choudhary	BJP	Rajyavardhan Singh Rathore
Jaipur	47	Amber	INC	Prashant Sharma	BJP	Satish Poonia
Jaipur	48	Jamwa Ramgarh (ST)	INC	Gopal Lal Meena	BJP	Mahendra Pal Meena
Jaipur	49	Hawa Mahal	INC	R.R. Tiwari	BJP	Balmukund Acharya
Jaipur	50	Vidhyadhar Nagar	INC	Sitaram Agarwal	BJP	Diya Kumari
Jaipur	51	Civil Lines	INC	Pratap Singh Khachariyawas	BJP	Gopal Sharma
Jaipur	52	Kishanpole	INC	Aminuddin Kagzi	BJP	Chandramohan Batvada
Jaipur	53	Adarsh Nagar	INC	Rafeek Khan	BJP	Ravi Nayyar
Jaipur	54	Malviya Nagar	INC	Archana Sharma	BJP	Kali Charan Saraf
Jaipur	55	Sanganer	INC	Pushpendra Bhardwaj	BJP	Bhajanlal Sharma
Jaipur	56	Bagru (SC)	INC	Ganga Devi Verma	BJP	Kailash Chand Verma
Jaipur	57	Bassi (ST)	INC	Laxman Meena	BJP	Chandramohan Meena
Jaipur	58	Chaksu (SC)	INC	Ved Prakash Solanki	BJP	Ramavatar Bairwa
Alwar	59	Tijara	INC	Imran Khan	BJP	Baba Balaknath Yogi
Alwar	60	Kishangarh Bas	INC	Deepchand Kheria	BJP	Ramhet Singh Yadav
Alwar	61	Mundawar	INC	Lalit Yadav	BJP	Manjeet Dharmpal Choudhary
Alwar	62	Behror	INC	Sanjay Yadav	BJP	Jaswant Singh Yadav
Alwar	63	Bansur	INC	Shakuntala Rawat	BJP	Devi Singh Shekhawat
Alwar	64	Thanagazi	INC	Kanti Prasad Meena	BJP	Hem Singh Bhadana
Alwar	65	Alwar Rural (SC)	INC	Tika Ram Jully	BJP	Jairam Jatav
Alwar	66	Alwar Urban	INC	Ajay Agarwal	BJP	Sanjay Sharma
Alwar	67	Ramgarh	INC	Zubair Khan	BJP	Jai Ahuja
Alwar	68	Rajgarh Laxmangarh (ST)	INC	Mange Lal Meena	BJP	Bannaram Meena
Alwar	69	Kathumar (SC)	INC	Sanjana Jatav	BJP	Ramesh Khinchi
Bharatpur	70	Kaman	INC	Zahida Khan	BJP	Nauksham Chaudhary
Bharatpur	71	Nagar	INC	Wajib Ali	BJP	Jawahar Singh Bedham
Bharatpur	72	Deeg-Kumher	INC	Vishvendra Singh	BJP	Shailesh Singh
Bharatpur	73	Bharatpur	RLD	Subhash Garg	BJP	Vijay Bansal
Bharatpur	74	Nadbai	INC	Joginder Singh Awana	BJP	Jagat Singh
Bharatpur	75	Weir (SC)	INC	Bhajan Lal Jatav	BJP	Bahadur Singh Koli
Bharatpur	76	Bayana (SC)	INC	Amar Singh Jatav	BJP	Bachchu Singh Banshiwal
Dholpur	77	Baseri (SC)	INC	Sanjay Kumar Jatav	BJP	Sukhram Koli
Dholpur	78	Bari	INC	Prashant Singh Parmar	BJP	Girraj Singh Malinga
Dholpur	79	Dholpur	INC	Shobha Rani Kushwaha	BJP	Shivcharan Kushawah
Dholpur	80	Rajakhera	INC	Rohit Bohra	BJP	Neerja Ashok Sharma
Karauli	81	Todabhim (ST)	INC	Ghanshyam Mahar	BJP	Ram Niwas Meena
Karauli	82	Hindaun (SC)	INC	Anita Jatav	BJP	Rajkumari Jatav
Karauli	83	Karauli	INC	Lakhan Singh Meena	BJP	Darshan Singh Gurjar
Karauli	84	Sapotra (ST)	INC	Ramesh Chand Meena	BJP	Hansraj Meena
Dausa	85	Bandikui	INC	Gajraj Khatana	BJP	Bhagchand Dakra
Dausa	86	Mahuwa	INC	Omprakash Hudla	BJP	Rajendra Meena
Dausa	87	Sikrai (SC)	INC	Mamta Bhupesh	BJP	Vikram Bansiwal
Dausa	88	Dausa	INC	Murari Lal Meena	BJP	Shankar Lal Sharma
Dausa	89	Lalsot (ST)	INC	Parsadi Lal Meena	BJP	Rambilas Meena
Sawai Madhopur	90	Gangapur	INC	Ramkesh Meena	BJP	Mansingh Gurjar
Sawai Madhopur	91	Bamanwas (ST)	INC	Indira Meena	BJP	Rajendra Meena
Sawai Madhopur	92	Sawai Madhopur	INC	Danish Abrar	BJP	Kirodi Lal Meena
Sawai Madhopur	93	Khandar (SC)	INC	Ashok Bairwa	BJP	Jitendra Kumar Gothwal
Tonk	94	Malpura	INC	Ghasi Lal Choudhary	BJP	Kanhaiya Lal Choudhary
Tonk	95	Niwai (SC)	INC	Prashant Bairwa	BJP	Ramsahay Verma
Tonk	96	Tonk	INC	Sachin Pilot	BJP	Ajit Singh Mehta
Tonk	97	Deoli-Uniara	INC	Harish Chandra Meena	BJP	Vijay Bainsla
Ajmer	98	Kishangarh	INC	Vikash Choudhary	BJP	Bhagirath Choudhary
Ajmer	99	Pushkar	INC	Naseem Akhtar Insaf	BJP	Suresh Singh Rawat
Ajmer	100	Ajmer North	INC	Mahendra Singh Ralawata	BJP	Vasudev Devnani
Ajmer	101	Ajmer South (SC)	INC	Droupadi Koli	BJP	Anita Bhadel
Ajmer	102	Nasirabad	INC	Shivprakash Gurjar	BJP	Ramswaroop Lamba
Ajmer	103	Beawar	INC	Paras Panch Jain	BJP	Shankar Singh Rawat
Ajmer	104	Masuda	INC	Rakesh Pareek	BJP	Virendra Singh
Ajmer	105	Kekri	INC	Raghu Sharma	BJP	Shatrughan Gautam
Nagaur	106	Ladnun	INC	Mukesh Bhakar	BJP	Karni Singh
Nagaur	107	Deedwana	INC	Chetan Dudi	BJP	Jitendra Singh Jodha
Nagaur	108	Jayal (SC)	INC	Manju Meghwal	BJP	Manju Baghmar
Nagaur	109	Nagaur	INC	Harendra Mirdha	BJP	Jyoti Mirdha
Nagaur	110	Khinwsar	INC	Tejpal Mirdha	BJP	Revat Ram Danga
Nagaur	111	Merta (SC)	INC	Shivratan Valmiki	BJP	Laxmanram Meghwal
Nagaur	112	Degana	INC	Vijaypal Mirdha	BJP	Ajay Singh Kilak
Nagaur	113	Makrana	INC	Zakir Hussain Gesawat	BJP	Sumita Bhinchar
Nagaur	114	Parbatsar	INC	Ramniwas Gawriya	BJP	Man Singh Kinsariya
Nagaur	115	Nawan	INC	Mahendra Chaudhary	BJP	Vijay Singh Chaudhary
Pali	116	Jaitaran	INC	Surendra Goyal	BJP	Avinash Gehlot
Pali	117	Sojat (SC)	INC	Niranjan Arya	BJP	Shobha Chauhan
Pali	118	Pali	INC	Bheem Raj Bhati	BJP	Gyanchand Parakh
Pali	119	Marwar Junction	INC	Khushveer Singh	BJP	Kesaram Choudhary
Pali	120	Bali	INC	Badri Ram Jakhar	BJP	Pushpendra Singh
Pali	121	Sumerpur	INC	Hari Shankar Mewara	BJP	Joraram Kumawat
Jodhpur	122	Phalodi	INC	Prakash Chhangani	BJP	Pabba Ram Bishnoi
Jodhpur	123	Lohawat	INC	Kishnaram Bishnoi	BJP	Gajendra Singh Khimsar
Jodhpur	124	Shergarh	INC	Meena Kanwar	BJP	Babu Singh Rathore
Jodhpur	125	Osian	INC	Divya Maderna	BJP	Bhairaram Chaudhary
Jodhpur	126	Bhopalgarh (SC)	INC	Geeta Barwar	BJP	Kamsa Meghwal
Jodhpur	127	Sardarpura	INC	Ashok Gehlot	BJP	Mahendra Singh Rathore
Jodhpur	128	Jodhpur	INC	Manisha Panwar	BJP	Atul Bhansali
Jodhpur	129	Soorsagar	INC	Shahzad Khan	BJP	Devendra Joshi
Jodhpur	130	Luni	INC	Mahendra Bishnoi	BJP	Jogaram Patel
Jodhpur	131	Bilara (SC)	INC	Mohan Lal Kataria	BJP	Arjun Lal Garg
Jaisalmer	132	Jaisalmer	INC	Rooparam	BJP	Chhotu Singh Bhati
Jaisalmer	133	Pokaran	INC	Saleh Mohammad	BJP	Mahant Pratap Puri
Barmer	134	Sheo	INC	Ameen Khan	BJP	Swaroop Singh Khara
Barmer	135	Barmer	INC	Mewaram Jain	BJP	Deepak Karwasara
Barmer	136	Baytoo	INC	Harish Chaudhary	BJP	Balaram Moondh
Barmer	137	Pachpadra	INC	Madan Prajapat	BJP	Arun Choudhary
Barmer	138	Siwana	INC	Manvendra Singh	BJP	Hameersingh Bhayal
Barmer	139	Gudamalani	INC	Sona Ram Choudhary	BJP	KK Vishnoi
Barmer	140	Chohtan (SC)	INC	Padmaram Meghwal	BJP	Aduram Meghwal
Jalore	141	Ahore	INC	Saroj Choudhary	BJP	Chhagan Singh Rajpurohit
Jalore	142	Jalore (SC)	INC	Ramila Meghwal	BJP	Jogeshwar Garg
Jalore	143	Bhinmal	INC	Samarjeet Singh	BJP	Poora Ram Choudhary
Jalore	144	Sanchore	INC	Sukhram Bishnoi	BJP	Devji Patel
Jalore	145	Raniwara	INC	Ratan Dewasi	BJP	Narayan Singh Dewal
Sirohi	146	Sirohi	INC	Sanyam Lodha	BJP	Otaram Dewasi
Sirohi	147	Pindwara-Abu (ST)	INC	Leela Ram Garasiya	BJP	Samaram Garasiya
Sirohi	148	Reodar (SC)	INC	Motiram Koli	BJP	Jagasi Ram Koli
Udaipur	149	Gogunda (ST)	INC	Mangi Lal Garasiya	BJP	Pratap Lal Bheel
Udaipur	150	Jhadol (ST)	INC	Heeralal Dangi	BJP	Babulal Kharadi
Udaipur	151	Kherwara (ST)	INC	Dayaram Parmar	BJP	Nanalal Aahri
Udaipur	152	Udaipur Rural (ST)	INC	Vivek Katara	BJP	Phool Singh Meena
Udaipur	153	Udaipur	INC	Gourav Vallabh	BJP	Tarachand Jain
Udaipur	154	Mavli	INC	Pushkar Lal Dangi	BJP	K.G. Paliwal
Udaipur	155	Vallabhnagar	INC	Preeti Shaktawat	BJP	Uday Lal Dangi
Udaipur	156	Salumber (ST)	INC	Raghuveer Meena	BJP	Amrit Lal Meena
Pratapgarh	157	Dhariawad (ST)	INC	Nagraj Meena	BJP	Kanhaiya Lal Meena
Dungarpur	158	Dungarpur (ST)	INC	Ganesh Ghogra	BJP	Bansilal Katara
Dungarpur	159	Aspur (ST)	INC	Rakesh Roat	BJP	Gopi Chand Meena
Dungarpur	160	Sagwara (ST)	INC	Kailash Kumar Bheel	BJP	Shankar Decha
Dungarpur	161	Chorasi (ST)	INC	Tarachand Bhagora	BJP	Sushil Katara
Banswara	162	Ghatol (ST)	INC	Nanalal Ninama	BJP	Manshankar Ninama
Banswara	163	Garhi (ST)	INC	Shankar Lal Charpota	BJP	Kailash Chandra Meena
Banswara	164	Banswara (ST)	INC	Arjun Singh Bamniya	BJP	Dhan Singh Rawat
Banswara	165	Bagidora (ST)	INC	Mahendrajeet Singh Malviya	BJP	Krishna Katara
Banswara	166	Kushalgarh (ST)	INC	Ramila Khadia	BJP	Bhimabhai Damor
Chittorgarh	167	Kapasan (SC)	INC	Shankar Lal Bairwa	BJP	Arjun Lal Jingar
Chittorgarh	168	Begun	INC	Rajendra Singh Bidhuri	BJP	Suresh Dhaker
Chittorgarh	169	Chittorgarh	INC	Surendra Singh Jadawat	BJP	Narpat Singh Rajvi
Chittorgarh	170	Nimbahera	INC	Udai Lal Anjana	BJP	Shrichand Kriplani
Chittorgarh	171	Bari Sadri	INC	Badri Lal Jat	BJP	Gautam Kumar
Pratapgarh	172	Pratapgarh (ST)	INC	Ramlal Meena	BJP	Hemant Meena
Rajsamand	173	Bhim	INC	Sudarshan Singh Rawat	BJP	Hari Singh Chauhan
Rajsamand	174	Kumbhalgarh	INC	Yogendra Singh Parmar	BJP	Surendra Singh Rathore
Rajsamand	175	Rajsamand	INC	Narayan Singh Bhati	BJP	Deepti Kiran Maheshwari
Rajsamand	176	Nathdwara	INC	C. P. Joshi	BJP	Vishvaraj Singh Mewar
Bhilwara	177	Asind	INC	Hagamilal Mewara	BJP	Jabbar Singh Sankhala
Bhilwara	178	Mandal	INC	Ramlal Jat	BJP	Udai Lal Bhadana
Bhilwara	179	Sahara	INC	Rajendra Trivedi	BJP	Ladu Lal Pitliya
Bhilwara	180	Bhilwara	INC	Om Narayaniwal	BJP	Vitthal Shankar Avasthi
Bhilwara	181	Shahpura	INC	Narendra Kumar Raigar	BJP	Lalaram Bairwa
Bhilwara	182	Jahazpur	INC	Dheeraj Gurjar	BJP	Gopichand Meena
Bhilwara	183	Mandalgarh	INC	Vivek Dhakar	BJP	Gopal Lal Sharma
Bundi	184	Hindoli	INC	Ashok Chandna	BJP	Prabhu Lal Saini
Bundi	185	Keshoraipatan (SC)	INC	C.L. Premi Bairwa	BJP	Chandrakanta Meghwal
Bundi	186	Bundi	INC	Harimohan Sharma	BJP	Ashok Dogara
Kota	187	Pipalda	INC	Chetan Patel	BJP	Premchand Gochar
Kota	188	Sangod	INC	Bhanu Pratap Singh	BJP	Heeralal Nagar
Kota	189	Kota North	INC	Shanti Kumar Dhariwal	BJP	Prahlad Gunjal
Kota	190	Kota South	INC	Rakhi Gautam	BJP	Sandeep Sharma
Kota	191	Ladpura	INC	Naimuddin Guddu	BJP	Kalpana Devi
Kota	192	Ramganj Mandi (SC)	INC	Mahendra Rajoria	BJP	Madan Dilawar
Baran	193	Anta	INC	Pramod Jain Bhaya	BJP	Kanwar Lal Meena
Baran	194	Kishanganj (ST)	INC	Nirmala Sahariya	BJP	Lalit Meena
Baran	195	Baran-Atru (SC)	INC	Panachand Meghwal	BJP	Radheyshayam Bairwa
Baran	196	Chhabra	INC	Karan Singh Rathore	BJP	Pratap Singh Singhvi
Jhalawar	197	Dag (SC)	INC	Chetraj Gehlot	BJP	Kaluram Meghwal
Jhalawar	198	Jhalrapatan	INC	Ram Lal Chouhan	BJP	Vasundhara Raje
Jhalawar	199	Khanpur	INC	Suresh Gurjar	BJP	Narendra Nagar
Jhalawar	200	Manohar Thana	INC	Nemi Chand Meena	BJP	Govind Ranipuriya

== Surveys and polls ==
=== Opinion polls ===
Seat share
Polling agency	Date published	Margin of error	Sample Size				Majority
Polling agency	Date published	Margin of error	Sample Size	INC	BJP	Others	Majority
ABP News-CVoter	25 July 2023	±3–5%	14,085	78-88	109-119	1-7	BJP
ABP News-CVoter	9 October 2023	±3–5%	30,044	59-69	127-137	2-7	BJP
ABP News-CVoter	4 November 2023	±3–5%	63,516	67-77	114-124	5-13	BJP

Vote share
Polling agency	Date published	Margin of error	Sample Size				Lead
Polling agency	Date published	Margin of error	Sample Size	INC	BJP	Others	Lead
ABP News-CVoter	25 July 2023	±3–5%	14,085	41%	45.8%	13.2%	4.8%
ABP News-CVoter	9 October 2023	±3–5%	30,044	42%	46%	12%	4%
ABP News-CVoter	4 November 2023	±3–5%	63,516	41.7%	44.8%	13.5%	3.1%

=== Exit polls ===
Exit polls were released on 30 November 2023.

Polling agency				Majority
Polling agency	INC+	BJP	Others	Majority
ABP News-CVoter	71-91	94-114	9-19	Hung
India Today-Axis My India	86-106	80-100	9-18	Hung
TV9 Bharatvarsh-Polstrat	90-100	100-110	5-15	BJP
Republic TV-Matrize	65-75	115-130	12-19	BJP
People's Insight	79	112	8	BJP
Times Now-ETG	56-72	108-128	13-21	BJP
Jan Ki Baat	62-85	100-122	14-15	BJP
India TV-CNX	94-104	80-90	14-18	Hung
News24-Today's Chanakya	101	89	9	INC
P-MARQ	69-91	105-125	5-15	BJP
Dainik Bhaskar	85-95	98-105	10-15	Hung
Poll of Polls	85	105	10	BJP
Actual Result	71	115	14	BJP

== Results ==
=== Results by party ===
Vote share by party
1. Bharatiya Janata Party (41.7%)
2. Indian National Congress (39.5%)
3. Rashtriya Loktantrik Party (2.39%)
4. Bharat Adivasi Party (2.33%)
5. Bahujan Samaj Party (1.82%)
6. Others (12.2%)
Seat share by alliance
1. Bharatiya Janata Party (57.5%)
2. Indian National Congress+ (35.5%)
3. Bharat Adivasi Party (1.51%)
4. Bahujan Samaj Party (1.00%)
5. Rashtriya Loktantrik Party (0.50%)
6. Independent (4.02%)

Source
Party		Popular vote			Seats		
Party		Votes	%	±pp	Contested	Won	+/−
Bharatiya Janata Party		16,608,741	41.70	▲2.93	200	115	▲42
INC+	Indian National Congress	15,763,069	39.58	▲0.28	199	70	▼30
INC+	Rashtriya Lok Dal	81,878	0.21	▼0.12	1	1	Steady
Total		15,844,947	39.79	▲0.16	200	71	▼30
Bharat Adivasi Party		929,969	2.33	▲2.33	27	3	▲3
Bahujan Samaj Party		721,554	1.81	▼2.22	184	2	▼4
RLP+	Rashtriya Loktantrik Party	946,209	2.38	▼0.02	78	1	▼2
RLP+	Aazad Samaj Party (Kanshi Ram)	355,259	0.89	▲0.89	56	0	Steady
Total		1,301,468	3.27	▲0.87	134	1	▼2
Other parties		1,445,687	3.62	▼0.77	452	–	▼4
Independents		2,950,608	7.41	▼2.06	734	8	▼5
NOTA		383,107	0.96	▼0.35			
Total		39,830,823	100	-	1875	200	-
Vote statistics
Valid votes		39,830,823	99.89				
Invalid votes		43,783	0.11				
Votes cast/turnout		39,874,606	75.33				
Abstentions		13,056,546	24.67				
Registered voters		52,931,152					

=== Results by district ===
District	Seats				bgcolor="#DDDDBB"	
District	Seats	BJP	INC	OTH	[[Bharat Aadivasi Party|BAP]	
District	Seats	Sri Ganganagar	6	2	4	—N/a
Hanumangarh	6	—N/a	6	—N/a		
Bikaner	7	6	1	—N/a		
Churu	6	1	4	1		
Jhunjhunu	7	2	5	—N/a		
Sikar	8	3	5	—N/a		
Jaipur	19	12	7	—N/a		
Alwar	11	5	6	—N/a		
Bharatpur	7	5	1	1		
Dholpur	4	—N/a	3	1		
Karauli	4	2	2	—N/a		
Dausa	5	4	1	—N/a		
Sawai Madhopur	4	2	2	—N/a		
Tonk	4	2	2	—N/a		
Ajmer	8	7	1	—N/a		
Nagaur	10	4	4	2		
Pali	6	5	1	—N/a		
Jodhpur	10	8	2	—N/a		
Jaisalmer	2	2	—N/a	—N/a		
Barmer	7	4	1	2		
Jalore	5	2	2	1		
Sirohi	3	2	1	—N/a		
Udaipur	8	6	2	—N/a		
Pratapgarh	2	1		—N/a	1	
Dungarpur	4	1	1		2	
Banswara	5	1	3	—N/a	1	
Chittorgarh	5	4	—N/a	1		
Rajsamand	4	4	—N/a	—N/a		
Bhilwara	7	6	—N/a	1		
Bundi	3	—N/a	3	—N/a		
Kota	6	4	2	—N/a		
Baran	4	4	—N/a	—N/a		
Jhalawar	4	3	1	—N/a		
Total	200	115	70	14		

=== Results by constituency ===
District	Constituency		Winner				Runner-up				Margin
District	#	Name	Candidate	Party	Votes	%	Candidate	Party	Votes	%	Margin
Sri Ganganagar	1	Sadulshahar	Gurveer Singh Brar	BJP	74,433	37.58	Om Bishnoi	IND	58,973	29.77	15,460
Sri Ganganagar	2	Ganganagar	Jaydeep Bihani	BJP	81,001	44.66	Karuna Ashok Chandak	IND	51,222	28.24	29,779
Sri Ganganagar	3	Karanpur	Rupinder Singh Kooner	INC	94,950	48.55	Surender Pal Singh	BJP	83,667	42.78	11,283
Sri Ganganagar	4	Suratgarh	Dungar Ram Gedar	INC	1,16,841	55.87	Rampratap Kasania	BJP	66,382	31.74	50,459
Anupgarh	5	Raisinghnagar (SC)	Sohan Lal Nayak	INC	79,586	37.08	Balvir Singh Luthra	BJP	65,561	30.54	14,025
Anupgarh	6	Anupgarh (SC)	Shimla Devi	INC	1,02,746	53.18	Santosh Bawri	BJP	64,865	33.58	37,881
Hanumangarh	7	Sangaria	Abhimanyu Poonia	INC	98,341	47.40	Gurdeep Singh	BJP	56,331	27.15	42,010
Hanumangarh	8	Hanumangarh	Ganesh Raj Bansal	IND	89,323	37.03	Amit Sahu	BJP	79,625	33.01	9,698
Hanumangarh	9	Pilibanga (SC)	Vinod Gothwal	INC	1,43,091	57.84	Dharmendra Kumar	BJP	87,818	35.50	55,273
Hanumangarh	10	Nohar	Amit Chachan	INC	1,03,623	43.22	Abhishek Matoria	BJP	1,02,728	42.85	895
Hanumangarh	11	Bhadra	Sanjeev Kumar Beniwal	BJP	1,02,748	44.68	Balwan Poonia	CPI(M)	1,01,616	44.19	1,132
Bikaner	12	Khajuwala (SC)	Vishwanath Meghwal	BJP	91,276	51.47	Govind Ram Meghwal	INC	73,902	41.67	17,374
Bikaner	13	Bikaner West	Jethanand Vyas	BJP	98,648	54.51	Bulaki Das Kalla	INC	78,454	43.35	20,194
Bikaner	14	Bikaner East	Siddhi Kumari	BJP	89,917	53.07	Yashpal Gehlot	INC	70,614	41.68	19,303
Bikaner	15	Kolayat	Anshuman Singh Bhati	BJP	1,01,093	50.04	Bhanwar Singh Bhati	INC	68,160	33.74	32,933
Bikaner	16	Lunkaransar	Sumit Godara	BJP	60,452	29.98	Rajendra Moond	INC	51,583	25.58	8,869
Bikaner	17	Dungargarh	Tarachand Saraswat	BJP	65,690	32.55	Manglaram Godara	INC	57,565	28.52	8,125
Bikaner	18	Nokha	Sushila Dudi	INC	83,215	38.87	Bihari Lal Bishnoi	BJP	75,066	35.06	8,149
Churu	19	Sadulpur	Manoj Kumar	BSP	64,368	32.92	Krishna Poonia	INC	61,794	31.60	2,574
Churu	20	Taranagar	Narendra Budania	INC	1,08,236	49.52	Rajendra Rathore	BJP	97,891	44.78	10,345
Churu	21	Sardarshahar	Anil Kumar Sharma	INC	99,582	42.27	Rajakaran Choudhary	IND	77,250	32.79	22,332
Churu	22	Churu	Harlal Saharan	BJP	99,432	50.05	Rafique Mandelia	INC	92,558	46.59	6,874
Churu	23	Ratangarh	Poosaram Godara	INC	1,09,383	53.69	Abhinesh Maharshi	BJP	79,720	39.13	29,663
Churu	24	Sujangarh (SC)	Manoj Kumar Meghwal	INC	86,790	43.18	Santosh Meghwal	BJP	84,337	41.96	2,453
Jhunjhunu	25	Pilani (SC)	Pitram Singh Kala	INC	86,798	44.48	Rajesh Dahiya	BJP	57,935	29.69	28,863
Jhunjhunu	26	Surajgarh	Sharwan Kumar	INC	1,15,684	57.74	Santosh Ahlawat	BJP	78,270	39.07	37,414
Jhunjhunu	27	Jhunjhunu	Brijendra Singh Ola	INC	86,798	44.48	Nisheet Kumar	BJP	57,935	29.69	28,863
Jhunjhunu	28	Mandawa	Rita Choudhary	INC	98,747	53.31	Narendra Kumar	BJP	80,030	43.21	18,717
Jhunjhunu	29	Nawalgarh	Vikram Singh Jakhal	BJP	1,12,037	53.96	Rajkumar Sharma	INC	88,857	42.80	23,180
Jhunjhunu	30	Udaipurwati	Bhagawana Ram Saini	INC	68,399	34.36	Shubhkaran Choudhary	BJP	67,983	34.15	416
Jhunjhunu	31	Khetri	Dharampal Gurjar	BJP	70,597	41.82	Manoj Ghumaria	BSP	61,483	36.42	9,114
Sikar	32	Fatehpur	Hakam Ali Khan	INC	84,194	46.38	Sharawan Choudhary	BJP	58,201	32.06	25,993
Sikar	33	Lachhmangarh	Govind Singh Dotasra	INC	1,13,304	52.51	Subhash Maharia	BJP	94,334	43.72	18,970
Sikar	34	Dhod (SC)	Gordhan Verma	BJP	85,543	42.30	Pema Ram	CPI(M)	72,165	35.69	13,378
Sikar	35	Sikar	Rajendra Pareek	INC	97,161	45.50	Ratan Lal Jaldhari	BJP	67,123	31.43	30,038
Sikar	36	Dantaramgarh	Virendra Singh	INC	99,413	45.03	Gajanand Kumawat	BJP	91,416	41.41	7,997
Sikar	37	Khandela	Subhash Meel	BJP	1,14,236	56.00	Mahadev Singh	INC	71,597	35.10	42,639
Sikar	38	Neem Ka Thana	Suresh Modi	INC	1,05,878	53.56	Prem Singh Bajor	BJP	72,788	36.82	33,090
Sikar	39	Srimadhopur	Jhabar Singh Kharra	BJP	81,080	41.28	Deependra Singh Shekhawat	INC	66,621	33.92	14,459
Jaipur	40	Kotputli	Hansraj Patel	BJP	67,716	38.37	Rajender Singh Yadav	INC	67,395	38.19	321
Jaipur	41	Viratnagar	Kuldeep Dhankad	BJP	83,262	46.88	Indraj Singh Gurjar	INC	65,673	36.98	17,589
Jaipur	42	Shahpura	Manish Yadav	INC	1,24,072	62.34	Alok Beniwal	IND	59,164	29.73	64,908
Jaipur	43	Chomu	Dr. Shikha Meel Barala	INC	85,746	40.15	Ram Lal Sharma	BJP	80,051	37.48	5,695
Jaipur	44	Phulera	Vidhyadhar Singh	INC	1,12,244	54.49	Nirmal Kumawat	BJP	85,346	41.43	26,898
Jaipur	45	Dudu (SC)	Prem Chand Bairwa	BJP	1,16,561	57.73	Babulal Nagar	INC	80,818	40.02	35,743
Jaipur	46	Jhotwara	Rajyavardhan Singh Rathore	BJP	1,47,913	47.75	Abhishek Chaudhary	INC	97,746	31.55	50,167
Jaipur	47	Amber	Prashant Sharma	INC	1,08,914	48.04	Satish Poonia	BJP	99,822	44.03	9,092
Jaipur	48	Jamwa Ramgarh (ST)	Mahendra Pal Meena	BJP	1,00,041	55.67	Gopal Meena	INC	61,614	34.29	38,427
Jaipur	49	Hawa Mahal	Balmukund Acharya	BJP	95,989	49.18	R. R. Tiwari	INC	95,015	48.68	974
Jaipur	50	Vidhyadhar Nagar	Diya Kumari	BJP	1,58,516	63.80	Sitaram Agarwal	INC	87,148	35.07	71,368
Jaipur	51	Civil Lines	Gopal Sharma	BJP	98,661	56.88	Pratap Singh Khachariyawas	INC	70,332	40.55	28,329
Jaipur	52	Kishanpole	Aminuddin Kagzi	INC	76,611	51.46	Chandra Manohar Batwara	BJP	69,555	46.72	7,056
Jaipur	53	Adarsh Nagar	Rafeek Khan	INC	1,03,421	52.18	Ravi Kumar Nayyar	BJP	89,348	45.08	14,073
Jaipur	54	Malviya Nagar	Kali Charan Saraf	BJP	92,506	60.62	Archana Sharma	INC	57,012	37.36	35,494
Jaipur	55	Sanganer	Bhajan Lal Sharma	BJP	1,45,162	58.44	Pushpendra Bhardwaj	INC	97,081	39.08	48,081
Jaipur	56	Bagru (SC)	Kailash Chand Verma	BJP	1,45,170	56.54	Ganga Devi Verma	INC	99,920	38.92	45,250
Jaipur	57	Bassi (ST)	Laxman Meena	INC	88,043	47.37	Chandramohan Meena	BJP	81,729	43.97	6,314
Jaipur	58	Chaksu (SC)	Ramavtar Bairwa	BJP	1,04,064	58.94	Ved Prakash Solanki	INC	54,684	30.97	49,380
Alwar	59	Tijara	Mahant Balaknath	BJP	1,10,209	49.03	Imran Khan	INC	1,04,036	46.28	6,173
Alwar	60	Kishangarh Bas	Deepchand Khairiya	INC	91,916	45.48	Ramhet Singh Yadav	BJP	81,420	40.29	10,496
Alwar	61	Mundawar	Lalit Yadav	INC	1,05,735	57.83	Manjeet Dharampal Choudhary	BJP	70,111	38.35	35,624
Alwar	62	Behror	Jaswant Singh Yadav	BJP	70,400	40.03	Baljeet Yadav	RJS	53,177	30.24	17,223
Alwar	63	Bansur	Devi Singh Shekhawat	BJP	61,605	33.84	Rohitash Kumar	ASP(KR)	54,185	29.77	7,420
Alwar	64	Thanagazi	Kanti Prasad Meena	INC	67,350	39.90	Hem Singh Bhadana	BJP	65,411	38.75	1,939
Alwar	65	Alwar Rural (SC)	Tika Ram Jully	INC	1,06,584	55.21	Jairam Jatav	BJP	81,251	41.31	27,333
Alwar	66	Alwar Urban	Sanjay Sharma	BJP	90,504	51.46	Ajay Agarwal	INC	81,417	46.30	9,087
Alwar	67	Ramgarh	Zubair Khan	INC	93,765	44.40	Sukhavant Singh	ASP(KR)	74,069	35.08	19,696
Alwar	68	Rajgarh-Laxmangarh (ST)	Mangelal Meena	INC	93,459	50.25	Banna Ram Meena	BJP	70,892	38.11	22,567
Alwar	69	Kathumar (SC)	Ramesh Khinchi	BJP	79,756	48.52	Sanjana Jatav	INC	79,347	48.27	409
Bharatpur	70	Kaman	Nauksham Chaudhary	BJP	78,646	37.81	Mukhtyar Ahmed	IND	64,740	31.13	13,906
Bharatpur	71	Nagar	Jawahar Singh Bedham	BJP	75,579	37.52	Wajib Ali	INC	74,048	36.76	1,531
Bharatpur	72	Deeg-Kumher	Shailesh Singh	BJP	89,063	50.09	Vishvendra Singh	INC	81,168	45.65	7,895
Bharatpur	73	Bharatpur	Subhash Garg	RLD	81,878	43.26	Vijay Bansal	BJP	76,491	40.41	5,387
Bharatpur	74	Nadbai	Jagat Singh	BJP	1,03,795	50.15	Joginder Singh Awana	INC	88,028	42.53	15,767
Bharatpur	75	Weir (SC)	Bahadur Singh Koli	BJP	94,056	49.78	Bhajan Lal Jatav	INC	87,084	46.09	6,972
Bharatpur	76	Bayana (SC)	Ritu Banawat	IND	1,05,749	54.94	Amar Singh	INC	65,107	33.82	40,642
Dholpur	77	Baseri (SC)	Sanjay Kumar Jatav	INC	86,145	56.92	Sukhram Koli	BJP	59,035	39.00	27,110
Dholpur	78	Bari	Jaswant Singh Gurjar	BSP	1,06,060	52.62	Girraj Singh	BJP	78,636	39.01	27,424
Dholpur	79	Dholpur	Shobha Rani Kushwaha	INC	69,724	39.97	Ritesh Sharma	BSP	52,935	30.34	16,789
Dholpur	80	Rajakhera	Rohit Bohra	INC	89,120	53.26	Neerja Sharma	BJP	73,563	43.97	15,557
Karauli	81	Todabhim (ST)	Ghanshyam Mahar	INC	97,389	54.08	Ramniwas Meena	BJP	68,528	38.05	28,861
Karauli	82	Hindaun (SC)	Anita Jatav	INC	91,628	48.89	Rajkumari Jatav	BJP	53,351	28.47	38,277
Karauli	83	Karauli	Darshan Singh Gurjar	BJP	89,666	46.01	Lakhan Singh Meena	INC	87,483	44.89	2,183
Karauli	84	Sapotra (ST)	Hansraj Meena	BJP	1,11,385	56.24	Ramesh Chand Meena	INC	67,551	34.11	43,834
Dausa	85	Bandikui	Bhagchand Tankda	BJP	92,067	51.27	Gajraj Khatana	INC	79,687	44.38	12,380
Dausa	86	Mahuwa	Rajendra Meena	BJP	66,376	41.54	Omprakash Hudla	INC	58,459	36.58	7,917
Dausa	87	Sikrai (SC)	Vikram Bansiwal	BJP	91,996	50.08	Mamta Bhupesh	INC	82,568	44.95	9,428
Dausa	88	Dausa	Murari Lal Meena	INC	98,238	53.81	Shankar Lal Sharma	BJP	67,034	36.72	31,204
Dausa	89	Lalsot (ST)	Rambilas Meena	BJP	1,20,962	60.77	Parsadi Lal Meena	INC	73,894	37.12	47,068
Sawai Madhopur	90	Gangapur	Ramkesh Meena	INC	83,457	41.86	Mansingh Gurjar	BJP	64,189	32.2	19,268
Sawai Madhopur	91	Bamanwas (ST)	Indira Meena	INC	80,378	50.64	Rajendra Meena	BJP	72,513	45.69	7,865
Sawai Madhopur	92	Sawai Madhopur	Kirodi Lal Meena	BJP	81,087	44.04	Danish Abrar	INC	58,577	31.81	22,510
Sawai Madhopur	93	Khandar (SC)	Jitendra Kumar Gothwal	BJP	92,059	51.07	Ashok Bairwa	INC	78,044	43.3	14,015
Tonk	94	Malpura	Kanhaiya Lal Choudhary	BJP	85,915	41.22	Ghasi Lal Choudhary	INC	69,726	33.45	16,189
Tonk	95	Niwai (SC)	Ram Sahay Verma	BJP	92,775	46.53	Prashant Bairwa	INC	79,834	40.04	12,941
Tonk	96	Tonk	Sachin Pilot	INC	1,05,812	56.12	Ajit Singh Mehta	BJP	76,337	40.48	29,475
Tonk	97	Deoli-Uniara	Harish Chandra Meena	INC	1,05,001	47.49	Vijay Singh Bainsla	BJP	85,826	38.82	19,175
Ajmer	98	Kishangarh	Vikash Choudhary	INC	83,645	38.59	Suresh Tak	IND	80,025	36.92	3,620
Ajmer	99	Pushkar	Suresh Singh Rawat	BJP	84,619	44.63	Naseem Akhtar Insaf	INC	70,750	37.31	13,869
Ajmer	100	Ajmer North	Vasudev Devnani	BJP	57,895	40.44	Mahendra Singh Ralawata	INC	53,251	37.19	4,644
Ajmer	101	Ajmer South (SC)	Anita Bhadel	BJP	71,319	50.22	Dropdi Koli	INC	66,873	47.09	4,446
Ajmer	102	Nasirabad	Ramswaroop Lamba	BJP	79,364	43.77	Shivprakash Gurjar	INC	78,229	43.14	1,135
Ajmer	103	Beawar	Shankar Singh Rawat	BJP	67,623	37.21	Parasmal Jain	INC	58,745	32.21	8,878
Ajmer	104	Masuda	Virendra Singh	BJP	74,266	37.13	Rakesh Pareek	INC	47,550	23.77	26,716
Ajmer	105	Kekri	Shatrughan Gautam	BJP	99,671	49.75	Raghu Sharma	INC	92,129	45.98	7,542
Nagaur	106	Ladnun	Mukesh Bhakar	INC	97,229	50.19	Karni Singh	BJP	81,275	41.95	15,954
Nagaur	107	Deedwana	Yoonus Khan	IND	70,952	36.21	Chetan Singh Choudhary	INC	68,560	34.99	2,392
Nagaur	108	Jayal (SC)	Manju Baghmar	BJP	70,468	39.20	Manju Meghwal	BJP	68,903	38.33	1,565
Nagaur	109	Nagaur	Harendra Mirdha	INC	87,110	46.29	Jyoti Mirdha	BJP	72,490	38.52	20,578
Nagaur	110	Khinwsar	Hanuman Beniwal	RLP	79,492	37.97	Rewant Ram Danga	BJP	77,433	36.99	2,059
Nagaur	111	Merta (SC)	Laxman Ram Meghwal	BJP	77,493	38.36	Shivratan Valmiki	INC	59,978	29.69	17,515
Nagaur	112	Degana	Ajay Singh Kilak	BJP	88,752	46.23	Vijaypal Mirdha	INC	80,997	42.19	7,755
Nagaur	113	Makrana	Zakir Hussain Gesawat	INC	96,544	46.91	Sumita Bhinchar	BJP	67,230	32.66	31,204
Nagaur	114	Parbatsar	Ramniwas Gawriya	INC	91,530	46.52	Man Singh Kinsariya	BJP	81,214	41.27	10,316
Nagaur	115	Nawan	Vijay Singh Chaudhary	BJP	1,06,159	52.53	Mahendra Choudhary	INC	82,211	40.68	23,948
Pali	116	Jaitaran	Avinash Gehlot	BJP	66,277	31.05	Surendra Goyal	INC	52,751	24.71	13,526
Pali	117	Sojat (SC)	Shobha Chauhan	BJP	94,852	55.76	Niranjan Arya	INC	63,080	37.08	31,772
Pali	118	Pali	Bheem Raj Bhati	INC	95,092	50.25	Gyanchand Parakh	BJP	87,204	46.08	7,888
Pali	119	Marwar Junction	Kesaram Choudhary	BJP	99,604	55.64	Khusveer Singh	INC	66,583	36.53	33,021
Pali	120	Bali	Pushpendra Singh	BJP	1,07,938	48.62	Badri Ram Jakhar	INC	97,445	43.89	10,493
Pali	121	Sumerpur	Joraram Kumawat	BJP	1,04,044	54.05	Harishankar Mewara	INC	76,662	39.83	27,382
Jodhpur	122	Phalodi	Pabba Ram Bishnoi	BJP	80,243	44.95	Prakash Chandra Chhangani	INC	69,459	38.91	10,784
Jodhpur	123	Lohawat	Gajendra Singh Khimsar	BJP	81,415	39.05	Kishna Ram Vishnoi	INC	70,866	33.99	10,549
Jodhpur	124	Shergarh	Babu Singh Rathore	BJP	1,02,868	49.66	Meena Kanwar	INC	77,824	37.57	25,044
Jodhpur	125	Osian	Bhairaram Chaudhary	BJP	1,03,746	49.36	Divya Maderna	INC	1,00,939	48.12	2,807
Jodhpur	126	Bhopalgarh (SC)	Geeta Barwar	INC	86,224	42.53	Pukhraj Garg	RLP	61,926	30.55	24,298
Jodhpur	127	Sardarpura	Ashok Gehlot	INC	96,859	56.67	Mahendra Rathore	BJP	70,463	41.23	26,396
Jodhpur	128	Jodhpur	Atul Bhansali	BJP	71,192	53.93	Manisha Panwar	INC	57,667	43.68	13,525
Jodhpur	129	Soorsagar	Devendra Joshi	BJP	1,17,065	58.27	Shahzad Aiyub Khan	INC	78,306	38.98	38,759
Jodhpur	130	Luni	Jogaram Patel	BJP	1,23,498	50.59	Mahendra Bishnoi	INC	98,829	40.48	24,678
Jodhpur	131	Bilara (SC)	Arjun Lal Garg	BJP	90,766	46.25	Mohanlal Katariya	INC	80,342	40.94	10,424
Jaisalmer	132	Jaisalmer	Chhotu Singh Bhati	BJP	1,04,636	52.62	Rooparam	INC	85,949	43.23	18,687
Jaisalmer	133	Pokaran	Pratap Puri	BJP	1,12,925	56.83	Saleh Mohammad	INC	77,498	39.00	35,427
Barmer	134	Sheo	Ravindra Singh Bhati	IND	79,495	31.44	Fateh Khan	IND	75,545	29.87	3,950
Barmer	135	Barmer	Priyanka Chowdhary	IND	1,06,948	49.30	Mewaram Jain	INC	93,611	43.16	13,337
Barmer	136	Baytoo	Harish Chaudhary	INC	76,821	36.00	Ummeda Ram Beniwal	RLP	75,911	35.58	910
Barmer	137	Pachpadra	Arun Choudhary	BJP	77,997	41.79	Madan Prajapat	INC	75,468	40.44	2,529
Barmer	138	Siwana	Hameer Singh Bhayal	BJP	62,875	35.18	Sunil Parihar	IND	51,068	28.58	11,807
Barmer	139	Gudamalani	KK Vishnoi	BJP	1,07,632	48.85	Sonaram Choudhary	INC	92,415	41.95	15,217
Barmer	140	Chohtan (SC)	Aduram Meghwal	BJP	1,03,205	43.46	Padma Ram Meghwal	INC	1,01,777	42.86	1,428
Jalore	141	Ahore	Chhagan Singh Rajpurohit	BJP	83,259	49.63	Saroj Choudhary	INC	72,044	42.94	11,215
Jalore	142	Jalore (SC)	Jogeshwar Garg	BJP	84,519	46.41	Ramila Meghwal	INC	64,983	35.69	19,536
Jalore	143	Bhinmal	Samarjit Singh	INC	97,157	47.28	Poora Ram Choudhary	BJP	96,130	47.28	1,027
Jalore	144	Sanchore	Jivaram Choudhary	IND	95,518	37.03	Sukhram Vishnoi	INC	90,847	35.22	4,671
Jalore	145	Raniwara	Ratan Devasi	INC	1,12,681	52.76	Narayan Singh Dewal	BJP	90,319	42.29	22,362
Sirohi	146	Sirohi	Ota Ram Dewasi	BJP	1,14,729	56.64	Sanyam Lodha	INC	78,924	38.96	35,805
Sirohi	147	Pindwara-Abu (ST)	Samaram Garasiya	BJP	70,647	43.82	Leelaram Grasiya	INC	57,553	35.70	13,094
Sirohi	148	Reodar (SC)	Motiram Koli	INC	93,120	46.94	Jagsi Ram Koli	BJP	89,556	45.14	3,564
Udaipur	149	Gogunda (ST)	Pratap Lal Bheel	BJP	87,827	44.58	Mangi Lal Garasiya	INC	84,162	42.72	3,665
Udaipur	150	Jhadol (ST)	Babulal Kharadi	BJP	76,537	34.99	Heeralal Darangi	INC	70,049	32.02	6,488
Udaipur	151	Kherwara (ST)	Dayaram Parmar	INC	77,342	35.29	Nana Lal Ahari	BJP	60,098	27.42	17,244
Udaipur	152	Udaipur Rural (ST)	Phool Singh Meena	BJP	1,03,039	48.03	Vivek Katara	INC	75,694	35.28	27,345
Udaipur	153	Udaipur	Tarachand Jain	BJP	97,466	58.73	Gourav Vallabh	INC	64,695	38.98	32,771
Udaipur	154	Mavli	Pushkar Lal Dangi	INC	77,696	38.19	Krishnagopal Paliwal	BJP	76,128	37.42	1,567
Udaipur	155	Vallabhnagar	Udailal Dangi	BJP	83,227	40.82	Preeti Gajendra Singh Sekhawat	INC	63,167	30.98	20,060
Udaipur	156	Salumber (ST)	Amrit Lal Meena	BJP	80,086	37.54	Raghuveer Meena	INC	65,395	30.66	14,691
Pratapgarh	157	Dhariawad (ST)	Thavar Chand Meena	BAP	83,655	37.67	Kanhaiya Lal Meena	BJP	76,964	34.66	6,691
Dungarpur	158	Dungarpur (ST)	Ganesh Ghogra	INC	69,338	35.79	Kantilal Roat	BAP	50,285	25.95	19,053
Dungarpur	159	Aspur (ST)	Umesh Meena	BAP	93,742	46.70	Gopichand Meena	BJP	64,802	32.29	28,940
Dungarpur	160	Sagwara (ST)	Shankarlal Decha	BJP	75,175	36.47	Mohanlal Roat	BAP	63,176	30.65	11,999
Dungarpur	161	Chorasi (ST)	Rajkumar Roat	BAP	1,11,150	53.92	Sushil Katara	BJP	41,984	20.37	69,166
Banswara	162	Ghatol (ST)	Nanalal Ninama	INC	88,335	38.57	Ashok Kumar	BAP	84,644	35.04	3,691
Banswara	163	Garhi (ST)	Kailash Chandra Meena	BJP	87,392	38.58	Shankarlal Charpota	INC	72,285	31.91	15,107
Banswara	164	Banswara (ST)	Arjun Singh Bamaniya	INC	93,017	40.54	Dhan Singh Rawat	BJP	91,617	39.93	1,400
Banswara	165	Bagidora (ST)	Mahendra Jeet Singh Malviya	INC	1,01,742	45.65	Jaikrishn Patel	BAP	60,387	27.09	41,355
Banswara	166	Kushalgarh (ST)	Ramila Khadiya	INC	97,480	41.48	Bheem Bhai	BJP	87,676	37.31	9,804
Chittorgarh	167	Kapasan (SC)	Arjun Lal Jingar	BJP	84,778	42.02	Shankar Lal Berwa	INC	63,434	31.44	21,344
Chittorgarh	168	Begun	Suresh Dhakar	BJP	1,36,714	58.01	Rajendra Singh Bidhuri	INC	86,053	36.51	50,661
Chittorgarh	169	Chittorgarh	Chandrabhan Singh Aakya	IND	98,446	45.35	Surendra Singh Jadawat	INC	91,623	42.21	6,823
Chittorgarh	170	Nimbahera	Shrichand Kriplani	BJP	1,16,640	49.10	Udai Lal Anjana	INC	1,12,795	47.48	3,845
Chittorgarh	171	Bari Sadri	Gautam Kumar	BJP	1,03,940	47.54	Badri Lal Jat	INC	92,108	42.13	11,832
Pratapgarh	172	Pratapgarh (ST)	Hemant Meena	BJP	87,644	40.03	Ramlal Meena	INC	62,535	28.56	25,109
Rajsamand	173	Bhim	Harisingh Rawat	BJP	93,905	57.46	Sudarshan Singh Rawat	INC	62,137	38.02	31,768
Rajsamand	174	Kumbhalgarh	Surendra Singh Rathore	BJP	78,133	50.11	Yogendra Singh Parmar	INC	56,073	35.96	22,060
Rajsamand	175	Rajsamand	Deepti Maheshwari	BJP	94,043	53.50	Narayan Singh Bhati	INC	62,081	35.31	31,962
Rajsamand	176	Nathdwara	Vishvaraj Singh Mewar	BJP	94,950	50.24	C. P. Joshi	INC	87,086	46.27	7,504
Bhilwara	177	Asind	Jabbar Singh Sankhala	BJP	74,586	33.60	Hagamilal Mewara	INC	73,060	32.91	1,526
Bhilwara	178	Mandal	Udai Lal Bhadana	BJP	35,878	56.83	Ram Lal Jat	INC	90,413	40.69	35,878
Bhilwara	179	Sahara	Ladu Lal Pitliya	BJP	1,17,203	61.76	Rajendra Trivedi	INC	54,684	28.82	62,519
Bhilwara	180	Bhilwara	Ashok Kumar Kothari	IND	70,095	36.68	Om Prakash Naraniwal	INC	59,317	31.04	10,778
Bhilwara	181	Shahpura	Lalaram Bairwa	BJP	1,00,135	54.28	Narendra Kumar Regar	INC	40,837	22.14	59,298
Bhilwara	182	Jahazpur	Gopichand Meena	BJP	96,933	48.35	Dheeraj Gurjar	INC	96,353	48.06	580
Bhilwara	183	Mandalgarh	Gopal Lal Sharma	BJP	93,119	46.67	Vivek Dhakar	INC	84,925	42.56	8,194
Bundi	184	Hindoli	Ashok Chandna	INC	1,27,354	56.60	Prabhu Lal Saini	BJP	82,350	36.6	44,004
Bundi	185	Keshoraipatan (SC)	Chunnilal Premi Bairwa	INC	1,01,541	49.29	Chandrakanta Meghwal	BJP	84,454	40.99	17,087
Bundi	186	Bundi	Harimohan Sharma	INC	1,00,107	41.88	Ashok Dogra	BJP	81,293	34.01	18,814
Kota	187	Pipalda	Chetan Patel Kolana	INC	89,281	54.72	Premchand Gochar	BJP	68,276	41.85	21,005
Kota	188	Sangod	Heeralal Nagar	BJP	93,435	55.78	Bhanu Pratap Singh	INC	67,849	40.51	25,586
Kota	189	Kota North	Shanti Dhariwal	INC	94,899	49.50	Prahlad Gunjal	BJP	92,413	48.21	2,486
Kota	190	Kota South	Sandeep Sharma	BJP	95,393	52.07	Rakhi Gautam	INC	83,431	45.54	11,962
Kota	191	Ladpura	Kalpana Devi	BJP	1,21,248	54.27	Naimuddin Guddu	INC	95,726	42.85	25,522
Kota	192	Ramganj Mandi (SC)	Madan Dilawar	BJP	1,03,504	52.99	Mahendra Rajoriya	INC	85,082	43.56	18,422
Baran	193	Anta	Kanwar Lal Meena	BJP	87,390	49.64	Pramod Jain	INC	81,529	46.31	5,861
Baran	194	Kishanganj (ST)	Lalit Meena	BJP	1,01,857	53.43	Nirmala Sahariya	INC	79,576	41.74	22,281
Baran	195	Baran-Atru (SC)	Radheyshayam Bairwa	BJP	1,01,530	53.84	Panachand Meghwal	INC	81,776	43.36	19,754
Baran	196	Chhabra	Pratap Singh Singhvi	BJP	65,000	32.73	Karan Singh	INC	59,892	30.16	5,108
Jhalawar	197	Dag (SC)	Kaluram Meghwal	BJP	1,01,251	46.56	Chetraj Gehlot	INC	76,990	36.12	24,261
Jhalawar	198	Jhalrapatan	Vasundhara Raje	BJP	1,38,831	59.51	Ramlal Chouhan	INC	85,638	36.71	53,193
Jhalawar	199	Khanpur	Suresh Gurjar	INC	99,045	49.76	Narendra Nagar	BJP	92,620	45.61	7,425
Jhalawar	200	Manohar Thana	Govind Prasad	BJP	85,304	37.82	Kailash Chand	IND	60,439	26.80	24,865

== Bypolls (2023-2028) ==
Date	Constituency		Previous MLA		Reason	Elected MLA	
26 April 2024	165	Bagidora	Mahendrajeet Singh Malviya	Indian National Congress	Resigned on 19 February 2024	Jaikrishn Patel	Bharat Adivasi Party
13 November 2024	27	Jhunjhunu	Brijendra Singh Ola	Indian National Congress	Elected to Lok Sabha on 4 June 2024	Rajendra Bhamboo	Bharatiya Janata Party
13 November 2024	67	Ramgarh	Zubair Khan	Indian National Congress	Died on 14 September 2024	Sukhavant Singh	Bharatiya Janata Party
13 November 2024	88	Dausa	Murari Lal Meena	Indian National Congress	Elected to Lok Sabha on 4 June 2024	Deen Dayal Bairwa	Indian National Congress
13 November 2024	97	Deoli-Uniara	Harish Chandra Meena	Indian National Congress	Elected to Lok Sabha on 4 June 2024	Rajendra Gurjar	Bharatiya Janata Party
13 November 2024	110	Khinwsar	Hanuman Beniwal	Rashtriya Loktantrik Party	Elected to Lok Sabha on 4 June 2024	Rewant Ram Danga	Bharatiya Janata Party
13 November 2024	156	Salumber	Amrit Lal Meena	Bharatiya Janata Party	Died on 8 August 2024	Shanta Amrit Lal Meena	Bharatiya Janata Party
13 November 2024	161	Chorasi	Rajkumar Roat	Bharat Adivasi Party	Elected to Lok Sabha on 4 June 2024	Anil Kumar Katara	Bharat Adivasi Party
11 November 2025	193	Anta	Kanwar Lal Meena	Bharatiya Janata Party	Disqualified on 23 May 2025	Pramod Jain Bhaya	Indian National Congress

== See also ==
- Third Gehlot ministry
- Bhajan Lal Sharma ministry
- Elections in Rajasthan
- 2023 elections in India
