= 1967 Rajasthan Legislative Assembly election =

Election in Indian state

← 1962	21 February 1967	1972 →

All 184 seats in the Rajasthan Legislative Assembly 93 seats needed for a majority
- Registered: 10,002,447
- Turnout: 51.80%
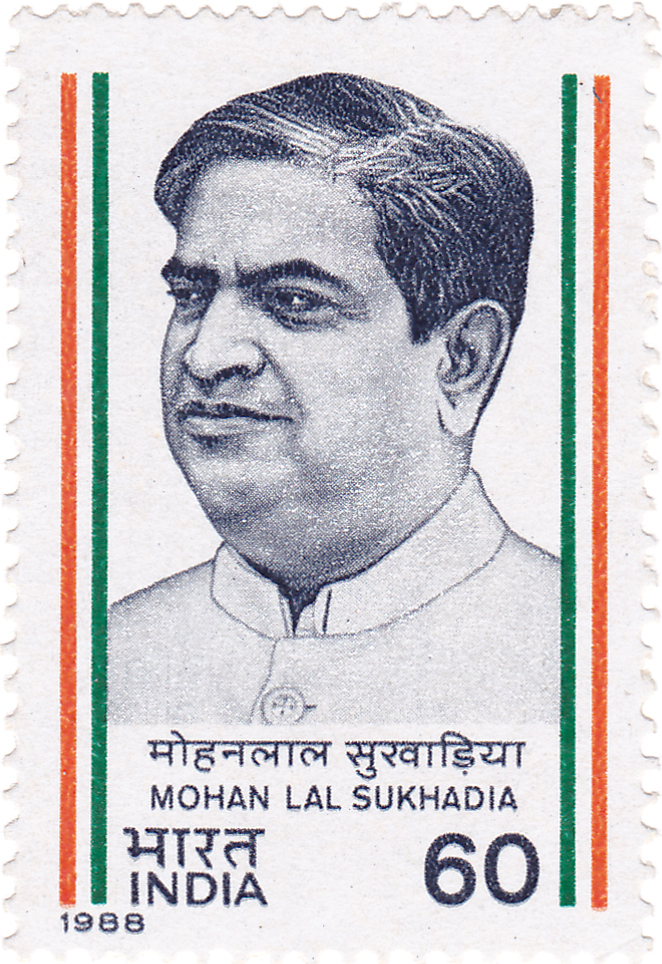
	Majority party	Minority party
		SWA
Leader	Mohan Lal Sukhadia
Party	INC	SWA
Leader's seat	Udaipur
Seats before	88	36
Seats won	89	48
Seat change	▲1	▲12
Popular vote	41.42%	22.10%
CM before election
Mohan Lal Sukhadia
INC
Elected CM
Mohan Lal Sukhadia
INC

Elections to the Rajasthan Legislative Assembly were held in February 1967, to elect members of the 184 constituencies in Rajasthan, India. The Indian National Congress won the most seats as well as the popular vote, and its leader, Mohan Lal Sukhadia was reappointed as the Chief Minister of Rajasthan for his fourth term.

After the passing of Delimitation of Parliamentary and Assembly Constituencies Order, 1966, Rajasthan's Legislative Assembly was assigned 184 constituencies.

== Result ==
Party	Votes	%	Seats	+/–
Indian National Congress	2,798,411	41.42	89	▲1
Swatantra Party	1,493,018	22.10	48	▲12
Bharatiya Jana Sangh	789,609	11.69	22	▲7
Samyukta Socialist Party	321,574	4.76	8	New
Communist Party of India	79,826	1.18	0	0
Communist Party of India	65,531	0.97	1	▼4
Praja Socialist Party	54,618	0.81	0	▼2
Jai Telangana Party	45,576	0.67	0	New
Republican Party of India	8,932	0.13	0	New
Independents	1,099,169	16.27	16	▼6
Total	6,756,264	100.00	184	▲8
Valid votes	6,756,264	79.34		
Invalid/blank votes	1,759,342	20.66		
Total votes	8,515,606	100.00		
Registered voters/turnout	10,002,447	85.14		
Source: ECI

== Elected members ==
Constituency	Reserved for (SC/ST/None)	Member	Party
Bhadra	None	H. Raj	Indian National Congress
Nohar	None	R. Chandra	Swatantra Party
Sangaria	SC	Birbal	Indian National Congress
Hanumangarh	None	B. Prakash	Indian National Congress
Ganganagar	None	K. Nath	Sanghata Socialist Party
Kesarisinghpur	SC	M. Ram	Indian National Congress
Karanpur	None	G. Singh	Indian National Congress
Raisingnagar	SC	M. Raj	Indian National Congress
Suratgarh	None	M. Singh	Indian National Congress
Lunkaransar	None	Bhimsen	Indian National Congress
Bikaner	None	G. Prasad	Indian National Congress
Kolayat	None	K. Kanta	Indian National Congress
Nokha	SC	C. Lal	Independent
Chhaper	SC	R. Ram	Independent
Sujangarh	None	L. Chand	Bharatiya Jana Sangh
Dungargarh	None	D. Ram	Independent
Sardarshahar	None	R. Singh	Independent
Churu	None	M. Raj	Independent
Sadulpur	None	S. Ram	Indian National Congress
Pilani	None	M.c. Katewa	Swatantra Party
Surajgarh	SC	Surajmal	Swatantra Party
Khetri	None	R. Singh	Swatantra Party
Gudha	None	S. Singh	Indian National Congress
Nawal Garh	None	S. Basotia	Swatantra Party
Jhunjhunu	None	Sumitra	Indian National Congress
Mandawa	None	R. Narain	Indian National Congress
Fatehpur	None	A. Ali	Swatantra Party
Lachhmangarh	SC	Nathmal	Swatantra Party
Sikar	None	R. Singh	Indian National Congress
Danta Ramgarh	None	M. Singh	Bharatiya Jana Sangh
Khandela	None	R. Chandra	Independent
Sri Madhopur	None	H. Singh	Bharatiya Jana Sangh
Neem Ka Thana	None	M. Lal	Indian National Congress
Ghomu	None	R. Singh	Swatantra Party
Amber	None	Sahdeo	Swatantra Party
Hawa Mahal	None	D. Lal	Independent
Johri Bazar	None	S.c. Agrawal	Bharatiya Jana Sangh
Kishanpole	None	Bhairon Singh Shekhawat	Bharatiya Jana Sangh
Gandhinagar	None	M.s. Powar	Swatantra Party
Phulera	None	P.k. Choudhry	Indian National Congress
Dudu	None	S. Lal	Swatantra Party
Phagi	SC	L.r. Sulania	Swatantra Party
Lalsot	ST	S. Ram	Swatantra Party
Sikrai	ST	K. Lal	Indian National Congress
Bandikul	None	B.n. Joshi	Indian National Congress
Dausa	SC	Doongaram	Swatantra Party
Bassi	SC	K. Lal	Swatantra Party
Jamuwa Ramgarh	None	N. Lal	Swatantra Party
Bairath	None	D. Singh	Indian National Congress
Kotputli	None	S. Ram	Swatantra Party
Bansur	None	B. Prasad	Independent
Behror	None	A. Lal	Sanghata Socialist Party
Mandawar	None	H. Prasad	Indian National Congress
Tijara	None	Amimddin	Indian National Congress
Khairthal	SC	G. Chand	Indian National Congress
Ramgarh	None	S. Ram	Indian National Congress
Alwar	None	Rama Nand	Communist Party of India
Thanagazi	None	J. Krishna	Indian National Congress
Rajgarh	ST	S. Lal	Swatantra Party
Kathumar	SC	G. Sahai	Bharatiya Jana Sangh
Kaman	None	Majlis	Indian National Congress
Deeg	None	Aditendra	Sanghata Socialist Party
Kumher	None	M. Singh	Independent
Bharatpur	None	N. Singh	Sanghata Socialist Party
Nadbai	SC	Nathilal	Independent
Weir	None	R. Kishan	Sanghata Socialist Party
Bayana	None	M.b. Lal	Sanghata Socialist Party
Rajakhera	None	P. Singh	Indian National Congress
Dholpur	None	Banwarilal	Indian National Congress
Bari	SC	Balwant	Indian National Congress
Karauli	None	B. Pal	Indian National Congress
Sapotra	ST	Ramkumar	Bharatiya Jana Sangh
Khandar	SC	C. Lal	Swatantra Party
Sawai Madhopur	None	H. Sharma	Swatantra Party
Bamanwas	ST	P. Bamanwas	Swatantra Party
Gangapur	None	R. Palliwal	Indian National Congress
Hindaun	SC	S. Lal	Bharatiya Jana Sangh
Mahuwa	None	S. Singh	Indian National Congress
Todabhim	ST	C. Lal	Indian National Congress
Niwai	SC	J. Narain	Swatantra Party
Tonk	None	D. Vyas	Indian National Congress
Uniara	None	D. Singh	Swatantra Party
Todaraisingh	None	Jagannath	Indian National Congress
Malpura	None	D. Vyas	Indian National Congress
Kishangarh	None	S. Singh	Swatantra Party
Ajmer East	None	Ambalal	Bharatiya Jana Sangh
Ajmer West	None	Bhagwandas	Bharatiya Jana Sangh
Pushkar	None	Prabha Misra	Indian National Congress
Nasirabad	None	V. Singh	Swatantra Party
Beawar	None	F. Singh	Swatantra Party
Masuda	None	N. Singh	Indian National Congress
Bhinai	SC	Jasraj	Swatantra Party
Kekri	SC	Devilal	Swatantra Party
Hindoli	None	K. Singh	Bharatiya Jana Sangh
Patan	SC	N. Lal	Indian National Congress
Bundi	None	B. Sundar	Indian National Congress
Kota	None	K. Kumar	Bharatiya Jana Sangh
Digod	None	Brujballabh	Bharatiya Jana Sangh
Pipalda	None	M. Singh	Bharatiya Jana Sangh
Baran	None	D. Dutt	Bharatiya Jana Sangh
Kishanganj	ST	N. Lal	Bharatiya Jana Sangh
Chhabra	None	P. Singh	Bharatiya Jana Sangh
Atru	SC	R. Charan	Bharatiya Jana Sangh
Ramganj Mandi	None	J. Singh	Bharatiya Jana Sangh
Khanpur	None	H. Chandra	Bharatiya Jana Sangh
Aklera	None	B. Prasad	Swatantra Party
Jhalrapatan	None	R. P. Bohra	Independent
Pirawa	None	K. Lal	Swatantra Party
Dag	SC	Lachhman	Bharatiya Jana Sangh
Begun	None	H. Singh	Independent
Gangrar	SC	D. G. Lal	Indian National Congress
Kapasan	None	S. Lal	Indian National Congress
Chittorgarh	None	R. Kumar	Indian National Congress
Nibahera	None	Shriniwas	Indian National Congress
Badi Sadri	None	L. Singh	Indian National Congress
Pratapgarh	ST	Harlal	Indian National Congress
Kushalgarh	ST	Heera	Sanghata Socialist Party
Pipalkhunt	ST	Vithal	Sanghata Socialist Party
Banswara	None	H. Joshi	Indian National Congress
Bagidora	ST	Nathuram	Indian National Congress
Sagwara	ST	Bheekhabhai	Indian National Congress
Chorasi	ST	Ratanlal	Indian National Congress
Padwa	ST	M. Kumar	Indian National Congress
Dungarpur	None	Laxmansingh	Swatantra Party
Lasadia	ST	J. Narain	Indian National Congress
Vallabhnagar	None	G. Singh	Indian National Congress
Mavli	None	N. N. Acharya	Indian National Congress
Rajsamand	SC	Amritlal	Indian National Congress
Nathdwara	None	Kishanlal	Indian National Congress
Udaipur	None	Mohan Lal Sukhadia	Indian National Congress
Salumber	None	R. Lal	Indian National Congress
Sarada	ST	Devilal	Indian National Congress
Kherwara	ST	Vidyasagar	Indian National Congress
Phalasia	ST	Nathudas	Swatantra Party
Gogunda	ST	D. Kumar	Indian National Congress
Kumbhalgarh	None	Heeralal	Indian National Congress
Bhim	None	L. Kumari	Indian National Congress
Mandal	None	S. Charan	Indian National Congress
Sahada	None	J. Mal	Indian National Congress
Bhilwara	None	R. P. Lacha	Indian National Congress
Mandalgarh	None	M. Singh	Independent
Jahazpur	ST	K. Mal	Indian National Congress
Shahpura	SC	Bhura	Indian National Congress
Banera	None	Y. Singh	Indian National Congress
Asind	None	Girdharilal	Indian National Congress
Jaitaran	None	S. Lal	Indian National Congress
Sojat	None	P. Raj	Swatantra Party
Kharchi	None	S. Singh	Swatantra Party
Pali	None	M. Chand	Indian National Congress
Desuri	SC	Daulatram	Swatantra Party
Sumerpur	None	P. Bafna	Swatantra Party
Bali	None	Prathvisingh	Swatantra Party
Sirohi	None	M. Singh	Indian National Congress
Abu	ST	Gama	Indian National Congress
Reodar	SC	M. Lal	Swatantra Party
Sanchore	None	Raghunathji	Indian National Congress
Raniwara	None	D. Singh	Swatantra Party
Bhinmal	None	A. Singh	Swatantra Party
Jalore	SC	J. Ram	Swatantra Party
Ahore	None	M. Singh	Indian National Congress
Siwana	None	Kaloo	Swatantra Party
Pachpadra	None	M. Kor	Indian National Congress
Barmer	None	B. Chand	Indian National Congress
Gudha Malani	None	G. R. Chowdhary	Indian National Congress
Chohtan	None	A. Badi	Independent
Sheo	None	H. Singh	Indian National Congress
Jaisalmer	None	B. Singh	Swatantra Party
Shergarh	None	K. Singh	Indian National Congress
Jodhpur	None	B. Khan	Indian National Congress
Sardarpura	None	D. Dutt	Bharatiya Jana Sangh
Luni	None	P. C. Bishnoi	Indian National Congress
Bilara	SC	K. R. Arya	Indian National Congress
Bhopalgarh	None	M. P. Ram	Indian National Congress
Osian	None	R. Singh	Indian National Congress
Phalodi	None	D. Chand	Independent
Nagaur	None	M. Usman	Indian National Congress
Jayal	None	R. Singh	Independent
Ladnun	None	H. R. Burdak	Swatantra Party
Deedwana	None	M. D. Mathur	Indian National Congress
Nawan	None	K. Lal	Swatantra Party
Makrana	None	V. Singh	Swatantra Party
Parbatsar	SC	P. Ram	Swatantra Party
Degana	None	G. Punia	Indian National Congress
Merta	None	Gordhan	Swatantra Party

== Bypolls ==
Date	Constituency	Reason for by-poll	Winning candidate	Party
1967	Khanpur	Death	S. Kumari	Bharatiya Jana Sangh
1970	Tonk	Resignation of D. Vyas	S. Prasad	NCJ
1970	Nasirabad	Death of V. Singh	S. Singh	NCJ
Source:ECI

== See also ==
- List of constituencies of the Rajasthan Legislative Assembly
- 1967 elections in India
