= 1972 Rajasthan Legislative Assembly election =

Election in Indian state

- 6 March 1972

All 184 seats in the Rajasthan Legislative Assembly 93 seats needed for a majority
- Registered: 13,910,553
- Turnout: 57.76%
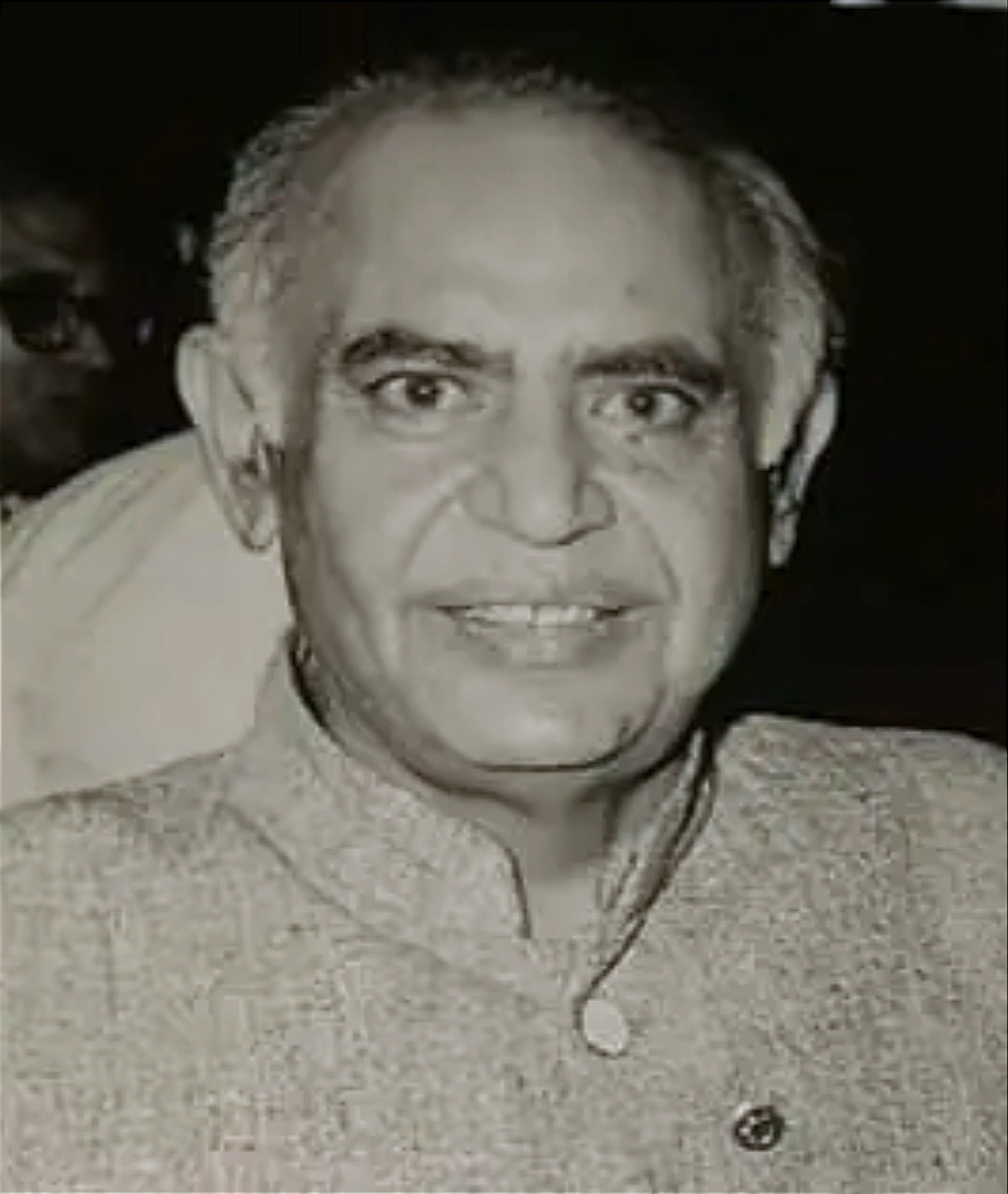

| | Majority party | Minority party | Third party |
|---|---|---|---|
| Leader | Barkatullah Khan |
| Party | INC(R) | SWA | CPI |
| Leader's seat | Tijara |
| Seats before | 89 | 48 |
| Seats won | 145 | 11 | 4 |
| Seat change | ▲56 | ▼37 | ▲3 |
| Popular vote | 51.13% | 12.32% | 1.56% |
CM before election
Barkatullah Khan
INC
Elected CM
Barkatullah Khan
INC

Elections to the Rajasthan Legislative Assembly were held in March 1972, to elect members of the 184 constituencies in Rajasthan, India. The Indian National Congress (R) won a majority of seats as well as the popular vote, and its leader, Barkatullah Khan was reappointed as the Chief Minister of Rajasthan. The Congress(R) had allocated five seats to the Communist Party of India (CPI) to contest, out of which the party won four seat.

After the passing of The Delimitation of Parliamentary and Assembly Constituencies Order, 1961, Rajasthan's Legislative Assembly was assigned 176 constituencies. This was increased to 184 constituencies by 1967.

== Result ==
| Party | Votes | % | Seats | +/– |
|---|---|---|---|---|
| Indian National Congress | 3,976,157 | 51.13 | 145 | ▲56 |
| Swatantra Party | 958,097 | 12.32 | 11 | ▼37 |
| Bharatiya Jana Sangh | 948,928 | 12.20 | 8 | ▼14 |
| Socialist Party | 189,851 | 2.44 | 4 | New |
| Communist Party of India | 121,591 | 1.56 | 4 | ▲3 |
| Indian National Congress (Organisation) | 104,398 | 1.34 | 1 | New |
| Communist Party of India (Marxist) | 74,514 | 0.96 | 0 | 0 |
| Vishal Haryana Party | 50,229 | 0.65 | 0 | New |
| Republican Party of India | 2,137 | 0.03 | 0 | 0 |
| Independents | 1,350,012 | 17.36 | 11 | ▼5 |
| Total | 7,775,914 | 100.00 | 184 | 0 |
| Valid votes | 7,775,914 | 96.77 | | |
| Invalid/blank votes | 259,313 | 3.23 | | |
| Total votes | 8,035,227 | 100.00 | | |
| Registered voters/turnout | 13,910,553 | 57.76 | | |
Source: ECI

== Elected members ==
| Constituency | Reserved for (SC/ST/None) | Member | Party |
|---|---|---|---|
| Bhadra | None | Gyan Singh Choudhary | Indian National Congress |
| Nohar | None | Bhim Raj | Indian National Congress |
| Sangaria | SC | Birbal | Indian National Congress |
| Hanumangarh | None | Ram Chandra Chaudhary | Indian National Congress |
| Ganganagar | None | Kedarnath | Socialist Party |
| Kesrisinghpur | SC | Manphool Ram | Indian National Congress |
| Karanpur | None | Gurdayal Singh | Socialist Party |
| Raisinghnagar | SC | Bega Ram | Swatantra Party |
| Suratgarh | None | Yogendra Nath | Communist Party of India |
| Lunkaransar | None | Bhim Sen | Indian National Congress |
| Bikaner | None | Gopal Joshi | Indian National Congress |
| Kolayat | None | Khathuria Kanta | Indian National Congress |
| Nodha | SC | Chuni Lal | Indian National Congress |
| Chhapar | SC | Rawat Ram | Indian National Congress |
| Sujangarh | None | Phool Chand | Indian National Congress |
| Dungargarh | None | Luna Ram | Indian National Congress |
| Sardarshahar | None | Chandanmal | Indian National Congress |
| Churu | None | Mohar Singh | Indian National Congress |
| Sadulpur | None | Ram Singh | Indian National Congress |
| Pilani | None | Sheesh Ram Ola | Indian National Congress |
| Surajgarh | SC | Sunder Lal | Indian National Congress |
| Khetri | None | Ramji Lal | Swatantra Party |
| Gudha | None | Rameshwar Lal | Independent |
| Nawalgarh | None | Bhanwar Singh | Indian National Congress |
| Jhunjhunu | None | Sumitra Singh | Indian National Congress |
| Mandawa | None | Ram Narain Choudhary | Indian National Congress |
| Fatehpur | None | Jhabar Mal | Indian National Congress |
| Lachhmangarh | SC | Keshar Deo | Swatantra Party |
| Sikar | None | Gordhan Singh | Swatantra Party |
| Danta Ramgarh | None | Narain Singh | Indian National Congress |
| Khandela | None | Gopal Singh | Independent |
| Srimadhopur | None | Sanwar Mal | Indian National Congress |
| Neem Ka Thana | None | Mala Ram | Bharatiya Jana Sangh |
| Chomu | None | Ram Kishore Byas | Indian National Congress |
| Amber | None | Shakuntla | Indian National Congress |
| Hawa Mahal | None | Girdhari Lal | Bharatiya Jana Sangh |
| Johri Bazar | None | Moheoaffar Ali | Communist Party of India |
| Kishanpole | None | Sriram Gotewala | Indian National Congress |
| Gandhinagar | None | Janardan Singh | Indian National Congress |
| Phulera | None | P. K. Chaudhari | Indian National Congress |
| Dudu | None | Kamla | Indian National Congress |
| Phagi | None | Jaikishan | Indian National Congress |
| Lalsot | ST | Meetha Lal | Swatantra Party |
| Sikrai | ST | Ram Chandra | Indian National Congress |
| Bandikui | None | Bishambar Nath Joshi | Indian National Congress |
| Dausa | SC | Mool Chand Samaria | Swatantra Party |
| Bassi | SC | Munshilal | Indian National Congress |
| Jamwa Ramgarh | None | Sahadeo | Indian National Congress |
| Bairath | None | Hanuman Sahai | Independent |
| Kotputli | None | Suresh Chandra | Swatantra Party |
| Bansur | None | Badri Prasad | Indian National Congress |
| Behror | None | Ghasi Ram Yadav | Indian National Congress |
| Mandawar | None | Ram Singh | Indian National Congress |
| Tijara | None | Barkatullah Khan | Indian National Congress |
| Khairthal | SC | Sampat Ram | Indian National Congress |
| Ramgarh | None | Shobha Ram | Indian National Congress |
| Alwar | None | Rama Nand | Communist Party of India |
| Thanagazi | None | Laxmi Narain | Swatantra Party |
| Rajgarh | ST | Hari Kishan | Independent |
| Kathumar | SC | Gokul Chand | Indian National Congress |
| Kaman | None | Manohar Lal | Bharatiya Jana Sangh |
| Deeg | None | Karan Singh | Indian National Congress |
| Kemher | None | Raja Mansingh | Independent |
| Bharatpur | None | Brijendra Singh | Bharatiya Jana Sangh |
| Nadbai | SC | Natha Singh | Indian National Congress |
| Weir | None | Usha | Indian National Congress |
| Bayana | None | Girraj Prasad | Indian National Congress |
| Rajakhera | None | Pradyuman Singh | Indian National Congress |
| Dholpur | None | Banwari Lal | Indian National Congress |
| Bari | SC | Ramlal | Independent |
| Karauli | None | M. K. Jendrapal | Independent |
| Sapotra | ST | Ram Kumar | Indian National Congress |
| Khandar | SC | Ram Gopal | Indian National Congress |
| Sawai Madhopur | None | Farooq Hasan | Indian National Congress |
| Bamanwas | ST | Bharat Lal | Indian National Congress |
| Gangapur | None | Harish Chandra | Indian National Congress |
| Hindaun | SC | Ummedi Lal | Bharatiya Jana Sangh |
| Mahuwa | None | Vishamber Dayal | Independent |
| Toda Bhim | ST | Chetram | Indian National Congress |
| Niwai | SC | Banwari Lal | Indian National Congress |
| Tonk | None | Ajit Singh | Bharatiya Jana Sangh |
| Uniara | None | Raoraja Rajendra Singh | Indian National Congress |
| Todarasingh | None | Chatur Bhuj | Indian National Congress |
| Malpura | None | Surendra Prasad | Indian National Congress |
| Kishangarh | None | Pratap Singh | Swatantra Party |
| Ajmer East | None | Manak Chand | Indian National Congress |
| Ajmer West | None | Kishan | Indian National Congress |
| Pushkar | None | Prabha Misra | Indian National Congress |
| Nasirabad | None | Shanker Singh | Indian National Congress |
| Beawar | None | Keshri Mal | Communist Party of India |
| Masuda | None | Narain Singh | Indian National Congress |
| Bhinai | SC | Bhagwat Devi | Indian National Congress |
| Kekri | SC | Jamuna Solanky | Indian National Congress |
| Hindoli | None | Ramesh Chand | Indian National Congress |
| Patan | SC | Nand Lal Bairwa | Indian National Congress |
| Bundi | None | Rajendra Kumar Bhartiya | Indian National Congress |
| Kota | None | Bhuvanash | Indian National Congress |
| Digod | None | Nagendra Bala | Indian National Congress |
| Pipalda | None | Gopi Lal | Indian National Congress |
| Baran | None | Shiv Narayan | Indian National Congress |
| Kishanganj | ST | Ram Gopal | Indian National Congress |
| Chhabra | None | Jagmohan Singh | Indian National Congress |
| Atru | SC | Ram Charan | Indian National Congress |
| Ramganj Mandi | None | Jujhar Singh | Indian National Congress |
| Khanpur | None | Gauri Shanker | Indian National Congress |
| Aklera | None | Bheru Lal | Indian National Congress |
| Jhalrapatan | None | Ram Prashad Bohra | Indian National Congress |
| Pirawa | None | Haji Jan Mohamadkhan | Indian National Congress |
| Dag | SC | Onkarlal | Indian National Congress |
| Begun | None | Hari Singh | Indian National Congress |
| Gangrar | SC | Ganesh Lal Reger | Indian National Congress |
| Kapasan | None | Sanker Lal | Indian National Congress |
| Chittorgarh | None | Nirmala Kumari | Indian National Congress |
| Nimrahera | None | Shri Niwas | Indian National Congress |
| Badi Sadri | None | Lalit Singh | Indian National Congress |
| Partabgarh | ST | Har Lal | Indian National Congress |
| Kushalgarh | ST | Jithing | Socialist Party |
| Pipal Khunt | ST | Vithal | Socialist Party |
| Banswara | None | Harideo Joshi | Indian National Congress |
| Bagidora | ST | Nathuram | Indian National Congress |
| Sagwara | ST | Bheekha Bhai | Indian National Congress |
| Chorasi | ST | Ramchandra | Indian National Congress |
| Padwa | ST | Mahendrakumar | Indian National Congress |
| Dungarpur | None | Lukshman Singh | Swatantra Party |
| Lasadia | ST | Jai Narayan | Indian National Congress |
| Vallabhnagar | None | Gulab Singh | Indian National Congress |
| Mavli | None | Acharya Niranjannath | Independent |
| Rajsamand | SC | Nana Lal | Indian National Congress |
| Nathuwara | None | Manoharlal | Indian National Congress |
| Udaipur | None | Bhanu Kumar Shastri | Bharatiya Jana Sangh |
| Salumber | None | Roshan Lal | Indian National Congress |
| Sarada | ST | Devi Lal | Indian National Congress |
| Kerwara | ST | Vidya Sagar | Indian National Congress |
| Phalsia | ST | Lala | Indian National Congress |
| Gogunda | ST | Alkharam | Indian National Congress |
| Kumbhalgarh | None | Heera Lal Devpura | Indian National Congress |
| Bhim | None | Chiman Singh Bhati | Indian National Congress |
| Mandal | None | Vijay Singh | Indian National Congress |
| Sahada | None | Jawahar Mal | Indian National Congress |
| Bhilwara | None | Bhauwat Lal Bhadada | Indian National Congress |
| Mandalgarh | None | Shiv Charan Mathur | Indian National Congress |
| Jahazpur | ST | Mool Chand | Indian National Congress |
| Shahpura | SC | Bhura | Indian National Congress |
| Benera | None | Yaswant Singh | Indian National Congress |
| Asind | None | Kishan Singh | Independent |
| Jaitaran | None | Sukhlal Sancha | Indian National Congress |
| Sojat | None | Pukhrajkalani | Indian National Congress |
| Kharchi | None | Dalpat Singh Siryari | Indian National Congress |
| Pali | None | Shankar Lal | Indian National Congress |
| Desuri | SC | Dinesh Rai Dangi | Indian National Congress |
| Sumerpur | None | Sajjan Singh | Indian National Congress |
| Bali | None | Mohan Raj | Indian National Congress |
| Sirohi | None | Shanti Lal Kothari | Indian National Congress |
| Abu | ST | Bhuraram | Indian National Congress |
| Reoda | SC | Jethmal Arya | Indian National Congress |
| Sanchore | None | Raghunath | Indian National Congress |
| Raniwara | None | Bhagraj Choudhary | Indian National Congress |
| Bhinmal | None | Poonam Chand | Indian National Congress |
| Jalore | SC | Virda Ram | Indian National Congress |
| Ahore | None | Samunder Kanwar | Indian National Congress |
| Siwana | SC | Jesa Ram | Indian National Congress |
| Pachpadra | None | Madan Kaur | Indian National Congress |
| Barmer | None | Virdhi Chand | Indian National Congress |
| Gudamalani | None | Ganga Ram Chowdhary | Indian National Congress |
| Chohtan | None | Abdul Hadi | Indian National Congress |
| Sheo | None | Hukam Singh | Indian National Congress |
| Jaisalmer | None | Bhopal Singh | Indian National Congress |
| Shergarh | None | Khet Singh | Indian National Congress |
| Jodhpur | None | Guman Mal Lodha | Bharatiya Jana Sangh |
| Sardarpura | None | Amrit Lal Gehlot | Indian National Congress |
| Luni | None | Ram Singh | Indian National Congress |
| Bilara | SC | Kalu Ram Arya | Indian National Congress |
| Bhopalgarh | None | Paras Ram Maderna | Indian National Congress |
| Osian | None | Ranjit Singh | Indian National Congress |
| Phaiodi | None | Mohan Lal Chhagani | Indian National Congress |
| Nagaur | None | Mohammad Usman | Indian National Congress |
| Jayal | None | Ram Singh Kuri | Independent |
| Ladnun | None | Deepankar | Indian National Congress |
| Deedwana | None | Bhomaram | Swatantra Party |
| Nawan | None | Rameshwar Lal | Indian National Congress |
| Makrana | None | Gouri Pooniya | Indian National Congress |
| Parbatsar | SC | Jeth Mal | Indian National Congress |
| Degana | None | Ramraghunath | Indian National Congress |
| Merta | None | Ramlal | Indian National Congress |

== See also ==
- List of constituencies of the Rajasthan Legislative Assembly
- 1972 elections in India
