= 1962 Rajasthan Legislative Assembly election =

Election in Indian state

- 19 February 1962

All 176 seats in the Rajasthan Legislative Assembly 89 seats needed for a majority
- Registered: 10,327,596
- Turnout: 52.33%
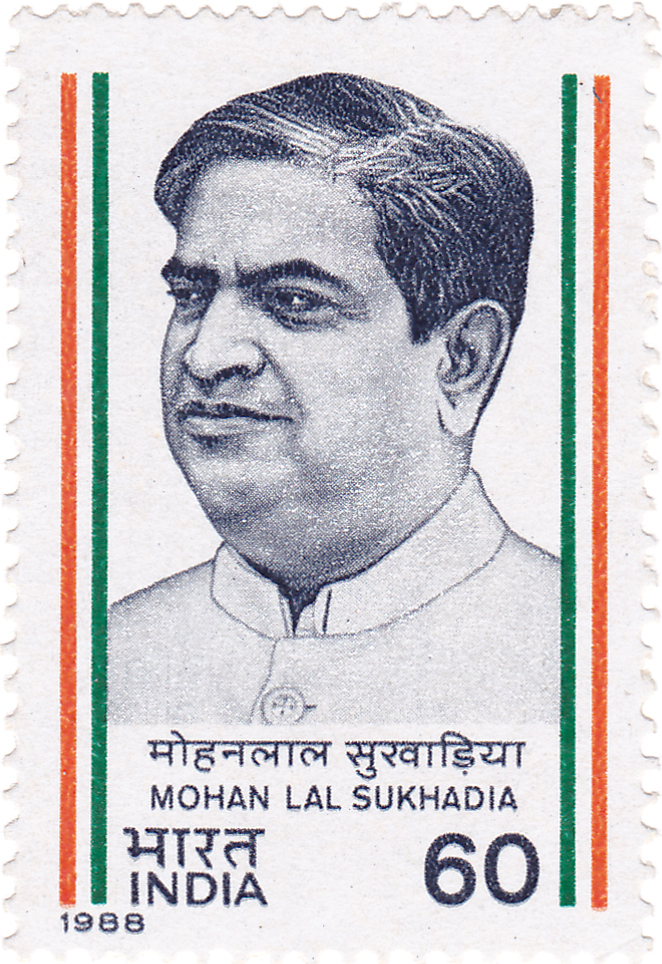
	Majority party	Minority party	Third party
		SWA	CPI
Leader	Mohan Lal Sukhadia
Party	INC	SWA	CPI
Leader's seat	Udaipur
Seats before	119	New
Seats won	88	36	5
Seat change	▼31	New	▲4
Popular vote	39.98%	17.11%	5.40%
CM before election
Mohan Lal Sukhadia
INC
Elected CM
Mohan Lal Sukhadia
INC

Elections to the Rajasthan Legislative Assembly were held in February 1962, to elect members of the 176 constituencies in Rajasthan, India. The Indian National Congress won the most seats as well as the popular vote, and its leader, Mohan Lal Sukhadia was reappointed as the Chief Minister of Rajasthan for his third term.

After the passing of The Delimitation of Parliamentary and Assembly Constituencies Order, 1961, double member constituencies were eliminated and Rajasthan's Legislative Assembly was assigned 176 single-member constituencies.

== Result ==
Party	Votes	%	Seats	+/–
Indian National Congress	2,052,383	39.98	88	▼31
Swatantra Party	878,056	17.11	36	New
Bharatiya Jana Sangh	469,497	9.15	15	▲9
Communist Party of India	276,972	5.40	5	▲4
Socialist Party	189,147	3.68	5	New
Akhil Bharatiya Ram Rajya Parishad	102,988	2.01	3	▼14
Praja Socialist Party	74,858	1.46	2	0
Hindu Mahasabha	17,481	0.34	0	New
Independents	1,071,581	20.88	22	▼10
Total	5,132,963	100.00	176	0
Valid votes	5,132,963	78.28		
Invalid/blank votes	1,424,303	21.72		
Total votes	6,557,266	100.00		
Registered voters/turnout	10,327,596	63.49		
Source: ECI

== Elected members ==
Source: ECI

Constituency	Reserved for (SC/ST/None)	Member	Party
Pilani	None	Hajari Lal	Independent
Surajgarh	SC	Shiv Narain Chhachhia	Swatantra Party
Khetri	None	Shisi Ram Ola	Indian National Congress
Gudha	None	Jiv Raj	Swatantra Party
Nawalgarh	None	Bhim Singh	Indian National Congress
Jhunjhunu	None	Sumitra	Indian National Congress
Mandawa	None	Raghuvir Singh	Swatantra Party
Fatehpur	None	Babu Ram	Independent
Lachhmangarh	None	Kishansingh	Indian National Congress
Sikar	None	Swaroop Narain	Indian National Congress
Singrawat	None	Ram Deo Singh	Indian National Congress
Danta Ramgarh	None	Jagan Singh	Indian National Congress
Sri Madhopur	None	Ram Chandra	Indian National Congress
Thoi	None	Gyan Chand	Indian National Congress
Neem Ka Thana	None	Chhotu	Indian National Congress
Chomu	SC	Bhanu Prashad	Swatantra Party
Amber	None	Man Singh	Swatantra Party
Hawa Mahal	None	Durga Lal	Swatantra Party
Johri Bazar	None	Satish Chandra	Jan Sangh
Kishanpole	None	Bheron Singh	Jan Sangh
Phulera	None	Sagar Mal	Swatantra Party
Dudu	None	Amarsingh	Swatantra Party
Phagi	SC	Gopi Lal Gothwal	Swatantra Party
Chaksu	None	Nathu Lal	Swatantra Party
Lalsot	ST	Ram Sahai	Swatantra Party
Sikrai	ST	Lakshman Prashad	Swatantra Party
Bandikui	None	Mathuresh Behari	Swatantra Party
Dausa	None	Mool Chand	Swatantra Party
Bassi	None	Abhai Singh	Swatantra Party
Jamwa Ramgarh	SC	Dunga Ram	Swatantra Party
Bairath	None	Kamla Devi	Indian National Congress
Kotputli	None	Muktilal	Indian National Congress
Behror	None	Ghasi Ram Yadav	Indian National Congress
Bansur	None	Satish Kumar	Independent
Mandawa	None	Hari Prasad	Indian National Congress
Tijara	SC	Hari Ram	Communist Party of India
Ramgarh	None	Uma Mathur	Indian National Congress
Alwar	None	Rama Nand	Communist Party of India
Thanagazi	None	Jai Krishan	Indian National Congress
Rajgarh	ST	Hari Kishan	Indian National Congress
Govindgarh	None	Nathi Singh	Independent
Kathumar	SC	Gokal Chand	Indian National Congress
Kaman	None	Majlis	Indian National Congress
Deeg	None	Man Singh	Swatantra Party
Bharatpur	None	Natthi Singh	Independent
Nadbai	SC	Natthi Lal	Independent
Weir	None	Ram Kishan	Socialist Party
Bayana	None	Mukat Behari Lal	Socialist Party
Rupbas	SC	Sawalia Ram	Swatantra Party
Rajakhera	None	Pratap Singh	Indian National Congress
Dholpur	None	Hari Shanker	Socialist Party
Bari	None	Raghubir Singh	Independent
Karauli	None	Brijendra Pal	Indian National Congress
Hindaun	SC	Sarwan	Jan Sangh
Mahuwa	None	Shiv Ram	Jan Sangh
Nadoti	None	Chhuttan Lal Meena	Indian National Congress
Gangapur	None	Govind Sahai	Jan Sangh
Malarna Chour	ST	Bharat Lal	Indian National Congress
Khandar	SC	Harphool	Swatantra Party
Sawai Madhopur	None	Ram Singh	Swatantra Party
Niwai	SC	Jai Narain	Swatantra Party
Tonk	None	Radha Krishan	Swatantra Party
Uniara	None	Digvijai Singh	Swatantra Party
Malpura	None	Jai Singh	Swatantra Party
Kishangarh	None	Bal Chand	Swatantra Party
Pushkar	None	Prabha Misra	Indian National Congress
Ajmer City-West	None	Pohumal	Indian National Congress
Ajmer City-East	None	Bal Krishna	Indian National Congress
Nasirabad	None	Jawala Prasad	Indian National Congress
Beawar	None	Kumaranand	Communist Party of India
Masuda	None	Narayan Singh	Indian National Congress
Bhinai	SC	Chauthu	Swatantra Party
Kekri	None	Haribhau Upadhyaya	Indian National Congress
Hindoli	ST	Ganga Singh	Indian National Congress
Patan	None	Hari Prasad	Jan Sangh
Bundi	None	Brij Sunder	Indian National Congress
Kota	None	Krishana Kumar Goyal	Jan Sangh
Digod	None	Mahendra Singh	Jan Sangh
Pipalda	ST	Laxmi Chand	Jan Sangh
Baran	SC	Daya Chand	Jan Sangh
Chhabra	None	Nagendra Bala	Indian National Congress
Atur	SC	Madho Lal	Indian National Congress
Chechat	None	Jujhar Singh	Indian National Congress
Khanpur	None	Prabhu Lal Senter	Independent
Aklera	ST	Bhairavlal Kala Badal	Indian National Congress
Jhalrapatan	None	Harish Chandra	Indian National Congress
Pirawa	None	Govind Singh	Indian National Congress
Dag	SC	Jailal	Jan Sangh
Begun	None	Choshar Singh Babel	Swatantra Party
Kapasan	None	Bhawani Shanker Nandwana	Indian National Congress
Chittorgarh	None	Chatarbhuj Upadhaya	Indian National Congress
Nimbahera	None	A. Jabbar	Jan Sangh
Bhadesar	SC	Ganesh Lal	Indian National Congress
Sadari	None	Shankar Lal Jat	Indian National Congress
Pratapgarh	ST	Harlal	Indian National Congress
Banswara	ST	Vithla	Socialist Party
Kushalgarh	ST	Hira	Socialist Party
Bagidora	ST	Nathuram	Indian National Congress
Ghatol	None	Harideo Joshi	Indian National Congress
Sagwara	ST	Bheeka Bhai	Indian National Congress
Dungarpur	ST	Vijaypal	Swatantra Party
Aspur	None	Lakshmansingh	Swatantra Party
Lasadia	None	Udailal	Swatantra Party
Bhopalsagar	SC	Amritlal	Indian National Congress
Mavli	None	Sampatlal	Jan Sangh
Rajsamand	None	Niranjan Nath Acharya	Indian National Congress
Nathdwara	None	Vije Singh	Jan Sangh
Udaipur	None	Mohan Lal Sukhadia	Indian National Congress
Girwa	None	Jodh Singh	Jan Sangh
Salumber	ST	Mava	Swatantra Party
Sarada	ST	Devi Lal	Indian National Congress
Phalasia	ST	Nana	Swatantra Party
Gogunda	ST	Lalit Mohan	Swatantra Party
Kumbhalgarh	None	Govind Singh	Swatantra Party
Bhim	None	Lakshmi Kumari Chundawat	Indian National Congress
Mandal	None	Gokul Prasad	Indian National Congress
Sahada	ST	Devender Kumar	Indian National Congress
Bhilwara	None	Nirmala Devi	Indian National Congress
Mandalgarh	None	Ganpati Lal	Indian National Congress
Jahazpur	None	Ram Prasad Ladha	Indian National Congress
Shahpura	SC	Kana	Indian National Congress
Banera	None	Umrao Singh	Independent
Asind	None	Girdhari Lal	Indian National Congress
Raipur	None	Mangi Lal	Independent
Sojat	None	Teja Ram	Indian National Congress
Pali	None	Kesri Singh	Swatantra Party
Kharchi	None	Kesree Singh	Indian National Congress
Desuri	SC	Dineshrai	Indian National Congress
Bali	None	Mohan Raj	Indian National Congress
Sumerpur	ST	Aldaram	Indian National Congress
Pindwara	None	Ravishanker	Indian National Congress
Sirohi	SC	Dharmaram	Indian National Congress
Abu	None	Dalpat Singh	Indian National Congress
Sanchore	None	Raghunath Vishno	Indian National Congress
Raniwara	None	Bhag Raj	Indian National Congress
Bhinmal	None	Malam Singh	Indian National Congress
Jalore	SC	Virda Ram	Indian National Congress
Ahore	None	Chhattra Singh	Akhil Bharatiya Ram Rajya Parishad
Siwana	SC	Hari Ram	Indian National Congress
Pachpadra	None	Amar Singh	Independent
Barmer	None	Umed Singh	Independent
Gudha Malani	None	Ganga Ram	Indian National Congress
Chohtan	None	Fateh Singh	Akhil Bharatiya Ram Rajya Parishad
Jaisalmer	None	Hukam Singh	Indian National Congress
Shergarh	None	Shobhag Singh	Akhil Bharatiya Ram Rajya Parishad
Jodhpur City-1	None	Anand Singh Kachhawaha	Indian National Congress
Jodhpur City-2	None	Barkatulla Khan	Indian National Congress
Luni	None	Swaroop Singh	Independent
Bilara	None	Chandra Singh	Independent
Osian	None	Parsh Ram	Indian National Congress
Phalodi	SC	Lala Ram	Indian National Congress
Nokha	SC	Rooparam	Independent
Kolayat	None	Manik Chand	Praja Socialist Party
Bikaner	None	Murlidhar Vyas	Praja Socialist Party
Lunkaransar	None	Bhimsen	Indian National Congress
Raisinghnagar	None	Yogendranath	Communist Party of India
Karanpur	None	Jawand Singh	Independent
Ganganagar	None	Kedarnath	Independent
Suratgarh	None	Manphool Singh	Indian National Congress
Hanumangarh	None	Shopat Singh	Communist Party of India
Rawatsar	SC	Juglal	Independent
Nohar	None	Hardutt Singh	Independent
Sadulpur	SC	Rawat Ram	Indian National Congress
Churu	None	Mohar Singh	Independent
Sardarshahar	None	Chandan Mal	Indian National Congress
Dungargarh	None	Daulat Ram	Indian National Congress
Ratangarh	None	Mohan Lal	Independent
Sujangarh	None	Phool Chand	Indian National Congress
Nagaur	None	Ram Niwas	Indian National Congress
Jayal	None	Ganga Singh	Swatantra Party
Ladnun	None	Mathuradas	Indian National Congress
Deedwana	None	Moti Lal	Indian National Congress
Nawan	None	Hanuman Singh	Independent
Parbatsar	SC	Jeth Mal	Indian National Congress
Degana	None	Gori Poonia	Indian National Congress
Merta	None	Nathu Ram	Indian National Congress

== Bypolls ==
Date	Constituency	Reason for by-poll	Winning candidate	Party
1964	Mahuwa	Void of S. Ram	Mandhata Singh	Swatantra Party
1964	Hanumangarh	Void of S. Singh	Kumbha Ram Arya	Indian National Congress
1965	Bansur	Void of S. Kumar's Election	B. Prasad	Indian National Congress
1965	Rajakhera	Death of P. Singh	Damodar Vyas	Indian National Congress
1965	Nohar	Death of H. Singh	D. Ram	Independent
Source:ECI

== See also ==
- List of constituencies of the Rajasthan Legislative Assembly
- 1962 elections in India
