= Vidhyadhar Singh =

Indian politician

Member of the Rajasthan Legislative Assembly
- Incumbent
- Assumed office 3 December 2023
- Preceded by: Nirmal Kumawat
- Constituency: Phulera

Vidhyadhar Singh (born 1956) is an Indian politician from Rajasthan. He is a member of the Rajasthan Legislative Assembly from Phulera Assembly constituency in Jaipur district. He won the 2023 Rajasthan Legislative Assembly election representing the Indian National Congress.

== Early life and education ==
Singh is from Phulera, Jaipur district, Rajasthan. He is the son of former MLA and Jat leader, Hari Singh. He completed his M.A. in history in 1979 at Rajasthan University, Jaipur.

== Career ==
Singh won from Phulera Assembly constituency representing the Indian National Congress in the 2023 Rajasthan Legislative Assembly election. He polled 112,244 votes and defeated his nearest rival and three time MLA, Nirmal Kumawat of the Bharatiya Janata Party, by a margin of 26,898 votes. His son in law Shailesh Singh was elected on a BJP ticket from Deeg Kumher Assembly constituency and both the father in law and son in law are expected to sit in the assembly representing different parties.
