= Ajay Singh Kilak =

Indian politician

Member of 13th Rajasthan Assembly
- In office 2008–2013
- Preceded by: Richpal Singh Mirdha
- Constituency: Degana

Member of 14th Rajasthan Assembly
- In office 2013–2018
- Preceded by: Richhpal Singh
- Succeeded by: Vijaypal Mirdha
- Constituency: Degana

Member of 16th Rajasthan Assembly
- Incumbent
- Assumed office 16 December 2023
- Preceded by: Vijaypal Mirdha
- Constituency: Degana

Personal details
- Party: Bharatiya Janata Party
- Occupation: Politician

Ajay Singh Kilak is an Indian politician currently serving as a member of the 16th Rajasthan Assembly, representing the Degana Assembly constituency as a member of the Bharatiya Janata Party.

== Political career ==
Following the 2023 Rajasthan Legislative Assembly election, he was elected as an MLA from the Degana Assembly constituency. He defeated Indian National Congress (INC) candidate Vijaypal Mirdha with 7,755 votes.

From 2008 to 2018, he was MLA from Degana Assembly constituency.
