= Harimohan Sharma =

Indian politician

Harimohan Sharma (born 1940) is an Indian politician from Rajasthan. He is a member of the Rajasthan Legislative Assembly from Bundi Assembly constituency in Bundi district. He won the 2023 Rajasthan Legislative Assembly election representing the Indian National Congress.

== Early life and education ==
Sharma is from Bundi, Bundi district, Rajasthan. He is the son of Gulab Shankar. He completed his LLB in 1967 at University of Rajasthan after completing his M.Com. in 1962 also at University of Rajasthan.

== Career ==
Sharma won from Bundi Assembly constituency representing Indian National Congress in the 2023 Rajasthan Legislative Assembly election. He polled 1,00,107 votes and defeated his nearest rival and three time MLA, Ashok Dogra of the Bharatiya Janata Party, by a margin of 18,814 votes. In the 2008 Rajasthan Legislative Assembly election he contested on the Congress ticket from Hindoli Assembly constituency and lost to the BJP candidate Prabhu Lal Saini, by a margin of 6,080 votes. He also lost the 2018 Rajasthan Legislative Assembly election to BJP candidate Ashok Dogra.
