= Raisinghnagar Assembly constituency =

Constituency of the Rajasthan legislative assembly in India

Coordinates: 29.53°N 73.45°E

Raisinghnagar
- Constituency No. 5 for the Rajasthan Legislative Assembly

Constituency details
- Country: India
- Region: North India
- State: Rajasthan
- District: Sri Ganganagar district
- Established: 1957
- Reservation: SC

Member of Legislative Assembly
- 16th Rajasthan Legislative Assembly
- Incumbent Sohan Lal Nayak
- Party: Indian National Congress
- Elected year: 2023

Raisinghnagar Assembly constituency is one of constituencies of Rajasthan Legislative Assembly in the Ganganagar Lok Sabha constituency.

== Members of the Legislative Assembly ==
Year	Member	Party
1957	Chuni Lal	Indian National Congress
1962	Yogendra Nath	Communist Party of India
1967	Mulk Raj	Indian National Congress
1972	Bega Ram	Swatantra Party
1977	Dula Ram	Indian National Congress
1980	Dula Ram	Indian National Congress
1985	Manphool Ram	Indian National Congress
1990	Ram Swaroop	Janata Dal
1993	Mulk Raj	Indian National Congress
1998	Nihalchand	Bharatiya Janata Party
2000^	Sohan Lal Nayak	Indian National Congress
2003	Lalchand Chauhan	Bharatiya Janata Party
2008	Daulat Raj	Indian National Congress
2013	Sonadevi	National Unionist Zamindara Party
2018	Balvir Singh Luthra	Bhartiya Janata Party
2023	Sohan Lal Nayak	Indian National Congress

== Election results ==
=== 2023 ===
2023 Rajasthan Legislative Assembly election: Raisinghnagar
Party	Candidate	Votes	%	±%
INC	Sohan Lal Nayak	79,586	37.08	+21.63
BJP	Balveer Singh Luthra	65,561	30.54	−7.44
CPI(M)	Shyopat Ram	61,057	28.44	+7.08
NOTA	None of the above	1,522	0.71	−0.2
Majority		14,025	6.54	−10.08
Turnout		214,655	79.89	−2.36
INC gain from BJP		Swing		

=== 2018 ===
2018 Rajasthan Legislative Assembly election: Raisinghnagar
Party	Candidate	Votes	%	±%
BJP	Balveer Singh Luthra	76,935	37.98	
CPI(M)	Shyopat Ram	43,264	21.36	
Independent	Sohan Lal Nayak	38,234	18.87	
INC	Sona Devi	31,294	15.45	
AAP	Suchcha Singh	3,541	1.75	
NOTA	None of the above	1,842	0.91	
Majority		33,671	16.62	
Turnout		202,592	82.25	
BJP gain from		Swing		

== See also ==
- Member of the Legislative Assembly (India)
