= Ganga Devi Verma =

Indian politician

Member of the Rajasthan Legislative Assembly
- In office 10 December 2018 – 4 December 2023
- Succeeded by: Kailash Chand Verma
- Constituency: Bagru
- In office 11 December 2008 – 09 December 2013
- Succeeded by: Kailash Chand Verma
- Constituency: Bagru

Personal details
- Born: 4 January 1958 (age 68) Village Bagru, Sanganer, Jaipur district, Rajasthan
- Party: Indian National Congress
- Spouse: Late Kajodilal Verma (m. 1975)
- Children: 2 sons & 1 daughter
- Education: Literacy
- Occupation: Politician
- Profession: Agriculture
- Source

Ganga Devi Verma (born 1958) is an Indian politician from Rajasthan. She is a two-time MLA from Bagru Assembly constituency of Jaipur district which is reserved for Scheduled Caste community. She represents Indian National Congress Party. She won the Rajasthan Legislative Assembly election in 2008 and regained the seat for Congress in the 2018 assembly election.

== Early life and education ==
Devi hails from Jaipur District. Her father's name is Bhanwar Lal Raigar. After school, she remained as a housewife and a social worker. Her late husband was Kajodi Lal Verma.

== Career ==
Devi won as MLA for the first time in 2008 representing Indian National Congress from Bagru Assembly constituency. She defeated Rakhshpal Kuldeep of BJP by a margin of 3,517 votes in the 2008 Rajasthan Legislative Assembly election. She did not contest the 2013 election where Congress fielded Prahlad Raghuvanshi and lost the seat. Again, she won the 2018 Rajasthan Legislative Assembly election defeating Kailash Chand Verma of Bharatiya Janata Party by a margin of 5,383 votes. She lost the 2023 Rajasthan Legislative Assembly election to Kailash Chand Verma of the Bharatiya Janata Party by a margin of 45,250 votes. She polled 99,920 votes while Verma got 145,170 votes.
