= Bhairavlal Kala Badal =

Indian tribal freedom fighter, poet and folk hero

Kala Badal
- Born: Bhairav Lal Meena; 4 September 1918; Tumda, Baran district, Rajasthan
- Died: 20 April 1997 (aged 78)
- Occupation: Poet
- Political party: Janata Party
- Other political affiliations: Indian National Congress
- Movement: Indian independence movement
- Parents: Kaluram Meena (father); Dhanni Bai Meena (mother)

Minister of State for Ayurved, Government of Rajasthan
- In office 1978–1980

Member of the Rajasthan Legislative Assembly
- In office 1977–1980
- Constituency: Khanpur
- In office 1957–1967
- Constituency: Aklera
- In office 1952–1957
- Constituency: Khanpur

Bhairav Lal Meena, popularly known as Kala Badal, was an Indian tribal freedom fighter, poet, politician and folk hero who belonged to the Meena tribe. He has been a member of the 1st, 2nd, 3rd, 5th and 6th Rajasthan Legislative Assembly and the Minister of State for Ayurveda in the Government of Rajasthan.

== Early life ==
Kala Badal was born in Tumra village of Baran district. He was born in the Meena tribe to Kaluram Meena and Dhanni Bai Meena. He has studied till middle school.

== Political career ==
Kala Badal started his political career by becoming a Zila Parishad member and in the same year he became the Deputy Chief of Jhalawar Zila Parishad. He got the post of Ayurveda (Independent Charge), Local Self Government and Town Planning in the government of Bhairon Singh Shekhawat.

== Positions held ==
| Year | Position |
|---|---|
| 1951–57 | Member, First Rajasthan Legislative Assembly from Khanpur |
| 1957–62 | Member, Second Rajasthan Legislative Assembly from Aklera |
| 1962-67 | Member, Third Rajasthan Legislative Assembly from Aklera |
| 1972-77 | Member, Fifth Rajasthan Legislative Assembly from Aklera |
| 1977-80 | Member, Sixth Rajasthan Legislative Assembly from Khanpur |
