= Sohan Lal Nayak =

Indian politician

Member of the Rajasthan Legislative Assembly
- Incumbent
- Assumed office 3 December 2023
- Preceded by: Balvir Singh Luthra
- Constituency: Raisinghnagar, Rajasthan

Personal details
- Party: Indian National Congress
- Education: Master of Arts; Bachelor of Laws
- Alma mater: Maharshi Dayanand Saraswati University; Maharaja Ganga Singh University

Sohan Lal Nayak is an Indian politician. He was elected to the 16th Rajasthan Assembly from Raisinghnagar, Rajasthan. He is a member of the Indian National Congress.
