= Phulera Assembly constituency =

Constituency of the Rajasthan legislative assembly in India

Coordinates: 26.87°N 75.24°E

Phulera
- Constituency No. 44 for the Rajasthan Legislative Assembly

Constituency details
- Country: India
- Region: North India
- State: Rajasthan
- District: Jaipur district
- Established: 1957
- Reservation: None

Member of Legislative Assembly
- 16th Rajasthan Legislative Assembly
- Incumbent Vidhyadhar Singh
- Party: Indian National Congress
- Elected year: 2023

Phulera Assembly constituency is one of constituencies of Rajasthan Legislative Assembly in the Jaipur Rural Lok Sabha constituency.

== Extent ==
Phulera constituency covers all voters from parts of Phulera tehsil, which include ILRC Sambhar including Sambhar Municipal Board and Phulera Municipal Board, ILRC Renwal including Kishangarh Renwal Municipal Board, ILRC Bhainslana, ILRC Narayana; and Doongari Khurd, Harsoli, Kherimilak and Ramjipura Kalan of ILRC Karansar.

== Members of the Legislative Assembly ==
| Year | Name | Party |
|---|---|---|
| 1957 | P K Chaudhari | Indian National Congress |
| 1962 | Sagar Mal | Swatantra Party |
| 1967 | P K Chaudhari | Indian National Congress |
| 1972 | P K Chaudhari | Indian National Congress |
| 1977 | Hari Singh | Janata Party |
| 1980 | Hari Singh | Indian National Congress |
| 1985 | Laxminarain Kisan | Lok Dal |
| 1990 | Hari Singh | Indian National Congress |
| 1993 | Hari Singh | Indian National Congress |
| 1998 | Nanuram Kakaraliya | Indian National Congress |
| 2003 | Navratan Rajoria | Bharatiya Janata Party |
| 2008 | Nirmal Kumawat | Bharatiya Janata Party |
| 2013 | Nirmal Kumawat | Bharatiya Janata Party |
| 2018 | Nirmal Kumawat | Bharatiya Janata Party |
| 2023 | Vidhyadhar Singh | Indian National Congress |

== Election results ==
=== 2023 ===
2023 Rajasthan Legislative Assembly election: Phulera
| Party | Candidate | Votes | % | ±% |
|---|---|---|---|---|
| INC | Vidhyadhar Singh | 112,244 | 54.49 | +14.55 |
| BJP | Nirmal Kumawat | 85,346 | 41.43 | +0.86 |
| ASP(KR) | Rakesh Joya | 3,075 | 1.49 | |
| NOTA | None of the above | 1,220 | 0.59 | +0.23 |
| Majority | | 26,898 | 13.06 | +12.43 |
| Turnout | | 206,004 | 78.46 | +2.92 |
| INC gain from BJP | | Swing | | |

=== 2018 ===
2018 Rajasthan Legislative Assembly election: Phulera
| Party | Candidate | Votes | % | ±% |
|---|---|---|---|---|
| BJP | Nirmal Kumawat | 73,530 | 40.57 | |
| INC | Vidhyadhar Singh | 72,398 | 39.94 | |
| RLP | Spurdha Choudhary | 9,946 | 5.49 | |
| Independent | Deen Dayal Kumawat Alias D.D. | 8,716 | 4.81 | |
| BSP | Prakash Chand | 5,777 | 3.19 | |
| CPI(M) | Banwari Lal Jat | 3,711 | 2.05 | |
| NOTA | None of the above | 652 | 0.36 | |
| Majority | | 1,132 | 0.63 | |
| Turnout | | 181,259 | 75.54 | |
| BJP hold | | Swing | | |

== See also ==
- Member of the Legislative Assembly (India)
