= Kailash Chand Verma =

Indian politician

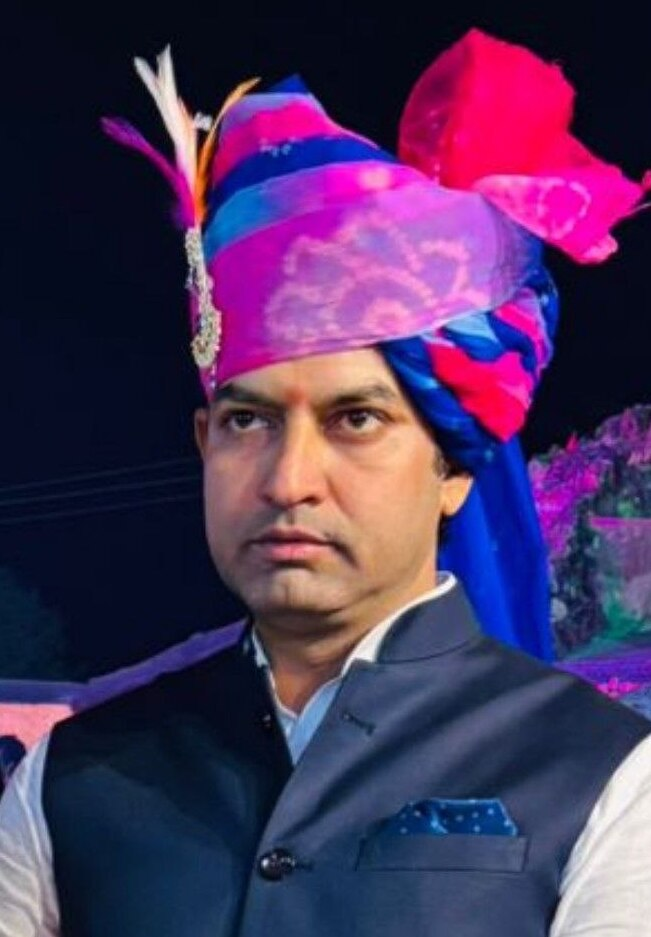
- Verma in 2025

Member of the Rajasthan Legislative Assembly
- Incumbent
- Assumed office 3 December 2023
- Preceded by: Ganga Devi
- Constituency: Bagru
- In office 2013–2018
- Preceded by: Ganga Devi
- Succeeded by: Ganga Devi

Parliamentary Secretary, Government of Rajasthan
- In office 10 December 2016 – 17 December 2018

Personal details
- Born: Nimeda, Jaipur, Rajasthan, India
- Party: Bharatiya Janata Party
- Spouse: Sita Devi
- Children: 1
- Education: M.A. & Ph.D.
- Alma mater: University of Rajasthan
- Occupation: Politician

Kailash Chand Verma is an Indian politician currently serving as a Member of the Rajasthan Legislative Assembly from Bagru. He previously served as the Parliamentary Secretary in the Government of Rajasthan from 2016 to 2018. He is a member of the Bharatiya Janata Party (BJP).

== Political career ==
Verma was first elected to the Rajasthan Legislative Assembly in 2013 from the Bagru constituency. During his first term, he served as a Parliamentary Secretary or represented the Bagru constituency in the Government of Rajasthan from 2016 to 2018.

In the 2018 Rajasthan Legislative Assembly election, Verma contested again from Bagru but was defeated by Ganga Devi of the Indian National Congress (INC). He subsequently reclaimed the seat in the 2023 election, where he defeated Ganga Devi by a margin of 45,250 votes.

== Electoral record ==
=== 2023 Bagru Assembly Election ===
Candidate	Party	Result	Votes	Vote share
Kailash Chand Verma	BJP	Elected	145,170	56.54%
Ganga Devi	INC	Runner-up	99,920	38.92%
Tarachand Raigar	RLTP	–	3,732	1.45%

=== 2018 Bagru Assembly Election ===
Candidate	Party	Result	Votes	Vote share
Ganga Devi	INC	Elected	96,635	44.77%
Kailash Chand Verma	BJP	Runner-up	91,292	42.30%
Dinesh Rai Bhati	RLTP	–	15,796	7.32%

=== 2013 Bagru Assembly Election ===
Candidate	Party	Result	Votes	Vote share
Kailash Chand Verma	BJP	Elected	100,947	57.34%
Dr. Prahlad Raghu	INC	Runner-up	54,591	31.01%
Ramji Lal Bairwa	NPEP	–	11,998	6.82%
