= Bagru Assembly constituency =

Legislative Assembly constituency in Rajasthan State, India

Coordinates: 26.81°N 75.55°E

Bagru
- Constituency No. 56 for the Rajasthan Legislative Assembly

Constituency details
- Country: India
- Region: North India
- State: Rajasthan
- District: Jaipur
- Lok Sabha constituency: Jaipur
- Established: 2008
- Total electors: 352,631
- Reservation: SC

Member of Legislative Assembly
- 16th Rajasthan Legislative Assembly
- Incumbent Kailash Chand Verma
- Party: Bhartiya Janta Party

Bagru Assembly constituency is one of the 200 Legislative Assembly constituencies of Rajasthan state in India.

It comprises parts of Sanganer tehsil and Jaipur city, both in Jaipur district, and is reserved for candidates belonging to the Scheduled Castes.

== Members of the Legislative Assembly ==
Election	Name	Party
2008	Ganga Devi	Indian National Congress
2013	Kailash Chand Verma	Bharatiya Janata Party
2018	Ganga Devi	Indian National Congress
2023	Kailash Chand Verma	Bharatiya Janata Party

== Election results ==
=== 2023 ===
2023 Rajasthan Legislative Assembly election: Bagru
Party	Candidate	Votes	%	±%
BJP	Kailash Chand Verma	145,170	56.54	+14.24
INC	Ganga Devi	99,920	38.92	−5.85
RLP	Tarachand Raigar	3,732	1.45	−5.87
NOTA	None of the above	2,407	0.94	−1.01
Majority		45,250	17.62	+15.15
Turnout		256,748	72.81	+0.07
BJP gain from INC		Swing		

=== 2018 ===
2018 Rajasthan Legislative Assembly election: Bagru
Party	Candidate	Votes	%	±%
INC	Ganga Devi	96,635	44.77	
BJP	Kailash Chand Verma	91,292	42.3	
RLP	Dinesh Rai Bhati	15,796	7.32	
NOTA	None of the above	4,203	1.95	
Majority		5,343	2.47	
Turnout		215,845	72.74	
INC gain from BJP		Swing		

== See also ==
- List of constituencies of the Rajasthan Legislative Assembly
- Jaipur district
