= Ratan Lal Jaldhari =

Indian politician

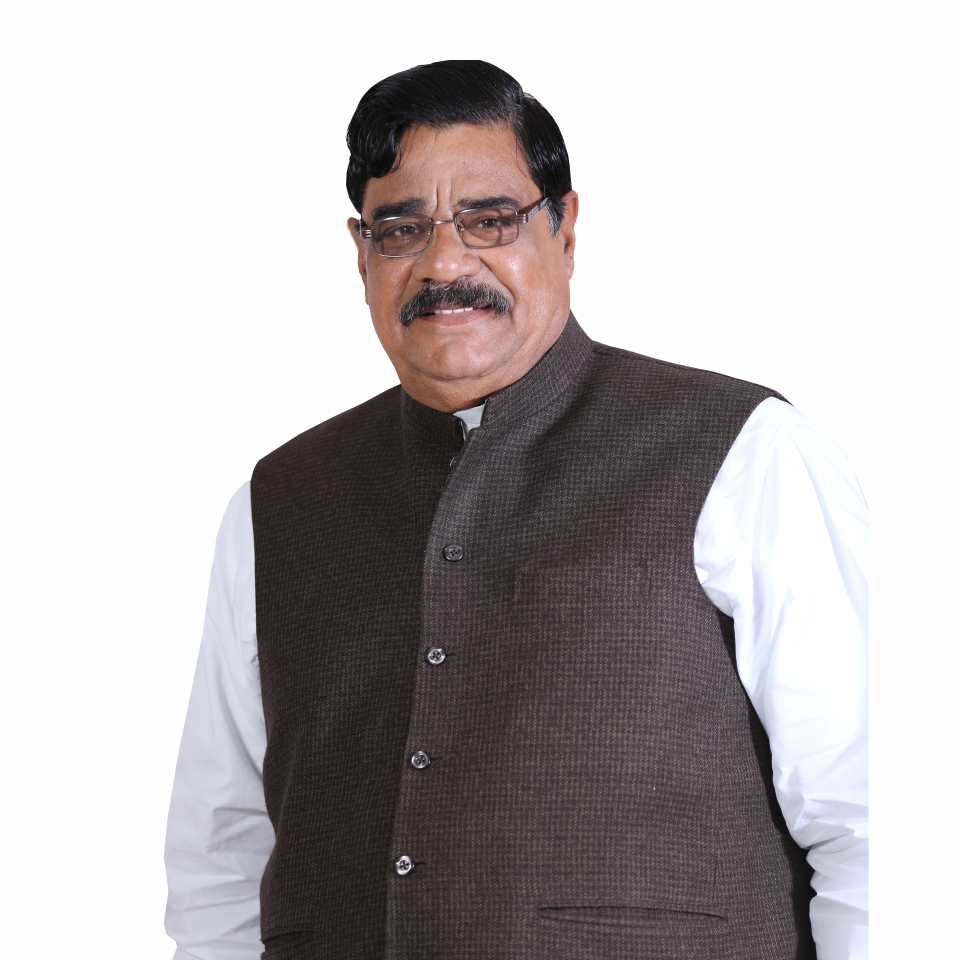
Ratan Lal Jaldhari

Ratan Lal Jaldhari (born 5 October 1948 in Sikar, Rajasthan) is a Bharatiya Janata Party politician from Rajasthan, India. He has been elected in Rajasthan Legislative Assembly election in 2013 from Sikar constituency.
