= Dharmpal =

Dharmpal is a given name. Notable people with the name include:

- Dharmpal Gurjar (fl. 2023), Indian politician
- Dharmpal Singh (born 1953), Indian politician
- Dharmpal Singh Gupta (1925–1997), Indian politician
