= Ashok Dogara =

Indian politician

Member of the Rajasthan Legislative Assembly
- In office 2008–2023
- Preceded by: Mamta Sharma
- Succeeded by: Harimohan Sharma
- Constituency: Bundi

Personal details
- Party: Bharatiya Janata Party

Ashok Dogra is an Indian politician and member of the Bharatiya Janata Party. He is a two term member of the Rajasthan Legislative Assembly. He is a member of 15th Rajasthan Legislative Assembly representing the Bundi constituency as an MLA.

== Constituency ==
Dogra was elected twice from the Bundi Vidhan Sabha constituency of Rajasthan.
