= Balvir Singh Luthra =

Indian politician and farmer

Balvir Singh Luthra is an Indian politician from Rajasthan. He is a former member of Rajasthan Legislative Assembly from Raisinghnagar Assembly constituency . He is a member of the Bharatiya Janata Party.

== Early life and education ==
Luthra was born in Sri Ganganagar in 1962. In 1984, he graduated from the University of Rajasthan.
