= Vijaypal Mirdha =

Indian politician

Member of the Rajasthan Legislative Assembly
- In office 2018–2023
- Preceded by: Ajay singh Kilak
- Constituency: Degana

Personal details
- Born: 15 July 1985 (age 40) Kuchera, Rajasthan
- Party: Bharatiya Janata Party (2024- Present)
- Other political affiliations: Indian National Congress (till 2024)
- Spouse: Tina Mirdha
- Children: 1 son

Shri Vijaypal Mirdha is a Bhartiya Janta Party leader and former MLA from Degana constituency in Rajasthan and a member of the Mirdha political family. He is son of Richpal Singh Mirdha.

== Political career ==
Vijaypal Mirdha started his political career as youth congress leader and he is elected as 1st time MLA from Degana seat of Nagaur in 2018 Rajasthan Assembly Election.

Vijaypal Mirdha has won the Degana assembly seat with huge margin of 21538 votes by defeating Ajay singh Kilak (Cabinet Minister) of BJP on 11 December 2018.
