= Ramanand Agarwal =

Indian politician

Member of the Rajasthan Legislative Assembly
- In office 1962–1977
- Preceded by: Chhotu Singh
- Succeeded by: Jeet Mal Jain
- Constituency: Alwar

Personal details
- Born: May 3, 1919
- Died: May 16, 1979 (aged 60)
- Party: Communist Party of India

Ramanand Agarwal is an Indian politician and leader of Communist Party of India (CPI). Agarwal was born on May 3, 1919 at Balwadi village in Gurgaon district, the son of Suarjbhan. Agarwal emerged as a student movement leader in 1938. He obtained B.A., LL.B. and J.D. degrees. Agarwal was active in the Indian National Congress movement, and in 1945 he became the president of the Gurgaon City Congress. He moved to Alwar in 1946. In 1948 he became the secretary of the Matsya Congress.

In April 1952 Agarwal broke with Congress and he joined the CPI. He soon became the secretary of the CPI party organisation in Alwar, in 1953 he became a member of the CPI Provincial Committee. He stood as a candidate in the 1957 election. From the late 1950s to 1967, Agarwal was a member of the CPI state secretariat. He was elected to the Rajasthan Legislative Assembly in 1962, and would be reelected in 1967 and 1972. He was elected Rajasthan CPI state secretary in July 1968. He was a member of the Revenue Laws Commission.

After the 1977 elections Agarwal authored a document in response to the Draft Report of the CPI National Council, criticizing the past cooperation of the party with Indira Gandhi's Congress(R) and its tacit support for the Emergency.

Agarwal died on May 16, 1979.
