= Gandhinagar, Rajasthan Assembly constituency =

Former Assembly constituency in Rajasthan, India

Coordinates: 26.881°N 75.806°E

Gandhinagar
- Former constituency for the Rajasthan Legislative Assembly

Constituency details
- Country: India
- Region: North India
- State: Rajasthan
- Established: 1967
- Abolished: 1977
- Reservation: None

Gandhinagar was a constituency of the Rajasthan Legislative Assembly from 1967 to 1977. The seat was abolished in the delimitation exercise and was renamed Banipark constituency.

In 1972, future Chief Minister Bhairon Singh Shekhawat, contested from Gandhinagar as a Jana Sangh candidate and was defeated.

== See also ==
- List of constituencies of Rajasthan Legislative Assembly
