= Nirmal Kumawat =

Indian politician

Member of the Rajasthan Legislative Assembly
- In office 2008 - 2023
- Constituency: Phulera
- Preceded by: Navratan Rajoria

Personal details
- Party: Bharatiya Janata Party
- Occupation: Politician

Nirmal Kumawat is an Indian politician from the Bharatiya Janata Party. He was a member of the Rajasthan Legislative Assembly representing the Phulera constituency. He is a three term member of the Rajasthan Legislative Assembly.
