= Bundi Assembly constituency =

Legislative Assembly constituency in Rajasthan State, India

Coordinates: 25.44°N 75.64°E

Bundi
- Constituency No. 186 for the Rajasthan Legislative Assembly

Constituency details
- Country: India
- Region: North India
- State: Rajasthan
- District: Bundi
- Lok Sabha constituency: Kota
- Established: 1972
- Total electors: 309,342
- Reservation: None

Member of Legislative Assembly
- 16th Rajasthan Legislative Assembly
- Incumbent Harimohan Sharma
- Party: Indian National Congress
- Elected year: 2023

Bundi Assembly constituency is one of the 200 Legislative Assembly constituencies of Rajasthan state in India.

It is part of Bundi district.

== Members of the Legislative Assembly ==
Year	Member	Party
1998	Mamta Sharma	Indian National Congress
2003	Mamta Sharma	Indian National Congress
2008	Ashok Dogara	Bharatiya Janata Party
2013	Ashok Dogara	Bharatiya Janata Party
2018	Ashok Dogara	Bharatiya Janata Party
2023	Harimohan Sharma	Indian National Congress

== Election results ==
=== 2023 ===
2023 Rajasthan Legislative Assembly election: Bundi
Party	Candidate	Votes	%	±%
INC	Harimohan Sharma	100,107	41.88	▼2.5
BJP	Ashok Dogra	81,293	34.01	▼10.69
Independent	Rupesh Sharma	39,805	16.65	
Independent	Prakash Chand Banjara	3,917	1.64	
ASP(KR)	Laxman Lal	2,272	0.95	
NOTA	None of the above	3,428	1.43	▲0.65
Majority		18,814	7.87	▲7.55
Turnout		239,054	77.28	▲1.57
INC gain from BJP		Swing		

=== 2018 ===
Rajasthan Legislative Assembly Election, 2018: Bundi
Party	Candidate	Votes	%	±%
BJP	Ashok Dogara	97,370	44.7	
INC	Harimohan Sharma	96,657	44.38	
BSP	Sita	3,556	1.63	
SDPI	Abdul Anis Ansari	3,456	1.59	
Independent	Santosh Kumari	3,002	1.38	
Independent	Mangilal Bheel	2,483	1.14	
Independent	Hemraj	2,102	0.97	
Independent	Lakhan	2,006	0.92	
NOTA	None of the above	1,692	0.78	
Majority		713	0.32	
Turnout		217,808	75.71	

== See also ==
- List of constituencies of the Rajasthan Legislative Assembly
- Bundi district
