= Degana Assembly constituency =

Legislative Assembly constituency in Rajasthan State, India

Coordinates: 26.9°N 74.32°E

Degana
- Constituency No. 112 for the Rajasthan Legislative Assembly

Constituency details
- Country: India
- Region: North India
- State: Rajasthan
- District: Nagaur
- Lok Sabha constituency: Rajsamand
- Established: 1972
- Total electors: 265,839
- Reservation: None

Member of Legislative Assembly
- 16th Rajasthan Legislative Assembly
- Incumbent Ajay Singh
- Party: Bharatiya Janata Party
- Elected year: 2023

Degana Assembly constituency is one of the 200 Legislative Assembly constituencies of Rajasthan state in India.

It comprises Degana tehsil, in Nagaur district. As of 2023, its representative is Ajay Singh of the Bharatiya Janata Party.

== Members of the Legislative Assembly ==
Election	Name	Party
2008	Ajay Singh	Bharatiya Janata Party
2013	Ajay Singh	Bharatiya Janata Party
2018	Vijaypal Mirdha	Indian National Congress

2023()ajay singh() bjp

== Election results ==
=== 2023 ===
2023 Rajasthan Legislative Assembly election: Degana
Party	Candidate	Votes	%	±%
BJP	Ajay Singh	88,752	46.23	+15.14
INC	Vijaypal Mirdha	80,997	42.19	−1.33
RLP	Laxmansingh Muwal	12,065	6.28	
NOTA	None of the above	2,500	1.3	−0.14
Majority		7,755	4.04	−8.39
Turnout		191,985	72.22	−0.59
BJP gain from INC		Swing		

=== 2018 ===
Rajasthan Legislative Assembly Election, 2018: Degana
Party	Candidate	Votes	%	±%
INC	Vijaypal Mirdha	75,362	43.52	
BJP	Ajay Singh Kilak	53,824	31.09	
Independent	Mangilal Kala	17,173	9.92	
Independent	Mohan Singh Saanju	13,205	7.63	
Independent	Bajrang Singh	3,476	2.01	
BSP	Shiv Deswal	2,472	1.43	
CPI	Bhanwar Lal	1,940	1.12	
JD(U)	Ranveersingh	1,737	1.0	
NOTA	None of the above	2,495	1.44	
Majority		21,538	12.43	
Turnout		173,150	72.81	

== See also ==
- List of constituencies of the Rajasthan Legislative Assembly
- Nagaur district
