= Kharchi Assembly constituency =

Legislative Assembly constituency in Rajasthan, India

Coordinates: 25.75°N 73.56°E

Kharchi
- Former constituency for the Rajasthan Legislative Assembly

Constituency details
- Country: India
- Region: North India
- State: Rajasthan
- Lok Sabha constituency: Pali
- Established: 1990
- Abolished: 2008
- Reservation: None

Kharchi was one of the seats in Rajasthan Legislative Assembly in India. It used to be a segment of Pali Lok Sabha seat.

== Members of Assembly ==
- 1990 : Khangar Singh Choudhary (BJP)
- 2003 : Khushveer Singh (INC)
- 2008 onwards : Seat does not exist.
- 2023 Kesaram Choudhary (BJP)

== Election results ==
=== 1990 Assembly Election ===
- Khangar Singh Choudhary (BJP) : 35,378 votes
- Chakarvarti Singh (INC) : 27,408

=== 2003 Assembly Election ===
- Khushveer Singh (INC) : 42,282 votes
- Kesha Ram Choudhary (BJP) : 35,411

== See also ==
- List of constituencies of Rajasthan Legislative Assembly
