= Kapasan Assembly constituency =

Legislative Assembly constituency in Rajasthan State, India

Coordinates: 24.88°N 74.31°E

Kapasan
- Constituency No. 167 for the Rajasthan Legislative Assembly

Constituency details
- Country: India
- Region: North India
- State: Rajasthan
- District: Chittorgarh
- Lok Sabha constituency: Chittorgarh
- Established: 1972
- Total electors: 269,727
- Reservation: SC

Member of Legislative Assembly
- 16th Rajasthan Legislative Assembly
- Incumbent Arjun Lal Jingar
- Party: Bharatiya Janata Party

Kapasan Assembly constituency is one of the 200 Legislative Assembly constituencies of Rajasthan state in India.

It is part of Chittorgarh district and is reserved for candidates belonging to the Scheduled Castes. As of 2023, it is represented by Arjun Lal Jingar of the Bharatiya Janata Party.

== Members of the Legislative Assembly ==
Election	Member	Party
2003	Badri Lal Jat	Bharatiya Janata Party
2008	Shankar	Indian National Congress
2013	Arjun Lal Jingar	Bharatiya Janata Party
2018	Arjun Lal Jingar	Bharatiya Janata Party
2023	Arjun Lal Jingar	Bharatiya Janata Party

== Election results ==
=== 2023 ===
2023 Rajasthan Legislative Assembly election: Kapasan
Party	Candidate	Votes	%	±%
BJP	Arjun Lal Jingar	84,778	42.02	+0.01
INC	Shankar Lal Berwa	63,434	31.44	−6.96
RLP	Anandi Ram	29,425	14.58	+0.42
Independent	Dinesh Chandra Bunkar	15,527	7.7	
NOTA	None of the above	2,845	1.41	−0.31
Majority		21,344	10.58	+6.97
Turnout		201,758	74.8	−2.8
BJP hold		Swing		

=== 2018 ===
Rajasthan Legislative Assembly Election, 2018: Kapasan
Party	Candidate	Votes	%	±%
BJP	Arjun Lal Jingar	81,470	42.01	
INC	Anandi Ram	74,468	38.4	
RLP	Shanti Lal	27,464	14.16	
BSP	Chunni Lal	1,833	0.95	
NOTA	None of the above	3,329	1.72	
Majority		7,002	3.61	
Turnout		193,911	77.6	

== See also ==
- List of constituencies of the Rajasthan Legislative Assembly
- Chittorgarh district
