= Mohanpura Ranwa =

- village
- Location in Rajasthan, India Mohanpura Ranwa (India)
- Coordinates: 26.54746°N 75.60328°E
- Country: India
- State: Rajasthan
- District: Jaipur
- Talukas: Phagi

Area
  - Total: 6.91 km^{2} (2.67 sq mi)
- Elevation: 383 m (1,257 ft)

Population
  - Total: 636
  - Density: 92/km^{2} (240/sq mi)

Languages
  - Official: Hindi
- Time zone: UTC+5:30 (IST)
- PIN: 303005
- Telephone code: 911430
- ISO 3166 code: RJ-IN
- Lok Sabha constituency: Ajmer
- Vidhan Sabha constituency: Dudu
- Distance from Phagi: 5 kilometres (3.1 mi) South-East (land)
- Distance from Nimera: 14 kilometres (8.7 mi) North-East (land)

Mohanpura Ranwa is a village in Mandi patwar circle in Phagi tehsil in Jaipur district, Rajasthan.

In Mohanpura Ranwa, there are 89 households with total population of 636 (with 54.56% males and 45.44% females), based on 2011 census. Total area of village is 6.91 km^{2}. There is one primary school in Mohanpura Ranwa village.
