= Awandiya =

Village in Jaipur (Rajasthan), India

- Village
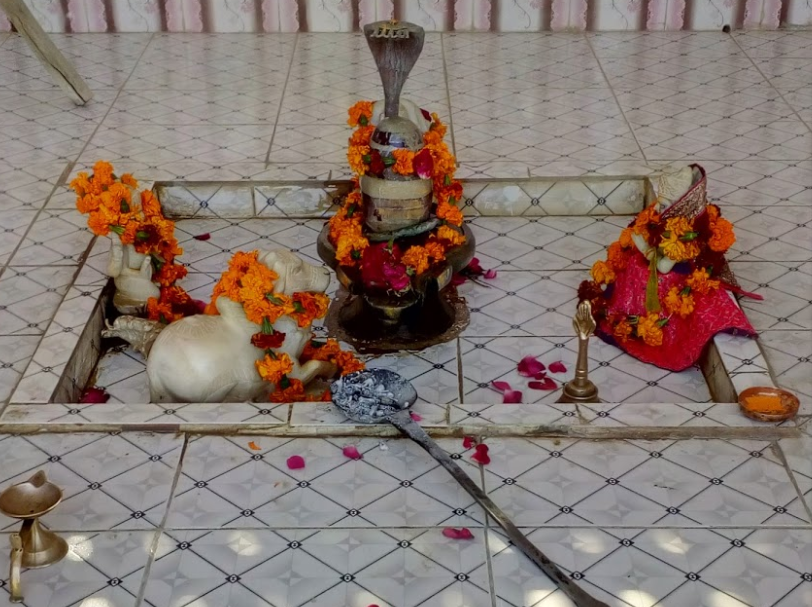
- Khusheshwar Mahadev Mandir

- Location in Rajasthan, India Awandiya (India)
- Coordinates: 26.6478889°N 75.5078654°E
- Country: India
- State: Rajasthan
- District: Jaipur
- Talukas: Phagi

Population
  - Total: 1,085

Languages
  - Official: Hindi
  - Spoken language: Dhundari language
- Time zone: UTC+5:30 (IST)
- PIN: 303005
- Telephone code: 911430
- ISO 3166 code: RJ-IN
- Vehicle registration: RJ-47
- Lok Sabha constituency: Ajmer
- Vidhan Sabha constituency: Dudu
- Distance from Jaipur: 51 kilometres (32 mi) South (land)
- Distance from Phagi: 10 kilometres (6.2 mi) North (land)

Awandiya is a village in Mandor ILRC in Phagi tehsil in Jaipur district, Rajasthan. It is situated 9 km away from sub-district headquarter Phagi and 51 km away from district headquarter Jaipur.

According to Census 2011 information the location code or village code of Awandiya village is 079886. Awandiya village is located in Phagi Tehsil of Jaipur district in Rajasthan, India. It is situated 9 km away from sub-district headquarter Phagi and 51 km away from district headquarter Jaipur. As per 2009 stats, Pachala is the gram panchayat of Awandiya village.

The total geographical area of village is 1132 hectares. Awandiya has a total population of 1,085 peoples. There are about 178 houses in Awandiya village. Jaipur is nearest town to Awandiya which is approximately 51 km away.
