= Didawata =

- village
- Location in Rajasthan, India Didawata (India)
- Coordinates: 26.49854°N 75.73288°E
- Country: India
- State: Rajasthan
- District: Jaipur
- Tehsil: Phagi

Area
  - Total: 16.95 km^{2} (6.54 sq mi)
- Elevation: 383 m (1,257 ft)

Population
  - Total: 2,172
  - Density: 128/km^{2} (330/sq mi)

Languages
  - Official: Hindi
- Time zone: UTC+5:30 (IST)
- PIN: 303006
- Telephone code: 911430
- ISO 3166 code: RJ-IN
- Lok Sabha constituency: Dausa
- Vidhan Sabha constituency: Chaksu
- Distance from Chaksu: 30 kilometres (19 mi) South-West (RJ SH 2)
- Distance from Madhorajpura: 15 kilometres (9.3 mi) South-East (land)

Didawata is a patwar circle and village in ILRC Madhorajpura in Phagi tehsil in Jaipur district, Rajasthan. Didawata is also a patwar circle for nearby villages, Bhanpura, Mukand Pura, Sangrampura, Hanootiya Kalan and Hanootiya Khurd.

In Didawata, there are 342 households with total population of 2,172 (with 53.59% males and 46.41% females), based on 2011 census. Total area of village is 16.95 km^{2}.
