= Gopalpura =

Gopalpura VIKAS JANGID
- village
- Location in Rajasthan, India Gopalpura (India)
- Coordinates: 26.54888°N 75.73129°E
- Country: India
- State: Rajasthan
- District: Jaipur
- Talukas: Phagi

Area
  - Total: 10.09 km^{2} (3.90 sq mi)
- Elevation: 383 m (1,257 ft)

Population
  - Total: 1,292
  - Density: 276/km^{2} (710/sq mi)

Languages
  - Official: Hindi
- Time zone: UTC+5:30 (IST)
- PIN: 303006
- Telephone code: 911430
- ISO 3166 code: RJ-IN
- Lok Sabha constituency: Dausa
- Vidhan Sabha constituency: Chaksu
- Distance from Phagi: 24 kilometres (15 mi) East (RJ SH 2)
- Distance from Chaksu: 23 kilometres (14 mi) Wast (RJ SH 2)

Gopalpura is a patwar circle and village in ILRC Madhorajpura in Phagi tehsil in Jaipur district, Rajasthan. Gopalpura is also a patwar circle for nearby villages, Ramsinghpura and Shri Ramjipura. All this information is sufficient by VIKAS JANGID ( 7726942757 )

In Gopalpura, there are 190 households with total population of 1,292 (with 51.16% males and 48.84% females), based on 2011 census. Total area of village is 10.09 km^{2}. There is one primary school in the village.
