= Rampura Railway =

- village
- Location in Rajasthan, India Rampura Railway (India)
- Coordinates: 26.56366°N 75.57620°E
- Country: India
- State: Rajasthan
- District: Jaipur
- Talukas: Phagi

Area
  - Total: 2.68 km^{2} (1.03 sq mi)
- Elevation: 383 m (1,257 ft)

Population
  - Total: 392
  - Density: 146/km^{2} (380/sq mi)

Languages
  - Official: Hindi
- Time zone: UTC+5:30 (IST)
- PIN: 303005
- Telephone code: 911430
- ISO 3166 code: RJ-IN
- Lok Sabha constituency: Ajmer
- Vidhan Sabha constituency: Dudu
- Distance from Phagi: 2.5 kilometres (1.6 mi) South-East (land)
- Distance from Nimera: 11 kilometres (6.8 mi) North-East (land)

Rampura Railway is a village in Mandi patwar circle in Phagi Tehsil in Jaipur district, Rajasthan.

In Rampura Railway, there are 44 households with total population of 392 (with 51.53% males and 48.47% females), based on 2011 census. Total area of village is 2.68 km^{2}. There is one primary school in Rampura Railway village.
