= Lasariya =

- village
- Location in Rajasthan, India Lasariya (India)
- Coordinates: 26.547°N 75.48663°E
- Country: India
- State: Rajasthan
- District: Jaipur
- Talukas: Phagi

Government
  - Type: Panchayati raj (India)
  - Body: Gram panchayat

Area
  - Total: 16.64 km^{2} (6.42 sq mi)
- Elevation: 383 m (1,257 ft)

Population
  - Total: 2,327
  - Density: 140/km^{2} (360/sq mi)

Languages
  - Official: Hindi
- Time zone: UTC+5:30 (IST)
- PIN: 303005
- Telephone code: 911430
- ISO 3166 code: RJ-IN
- Vehicle registration: RJ-
- Lok Sabha constituency: Ajmer
- Vidhan Sabha constituency: Dudu
- Distance from Phagi: 12 kilometres (7.5 mi) South-West (RJ SH 12)
- Distance from Nimera: 7 kilometres (4.3 mi) North-West (land)

Lasariya is a patwar circle and village in ILRC Nimera in Phagi Tehsil in Jaipur district, Rajasthan. Lasariya is also a patwar circle for nearby village, Palri.

In Lasariya, there are 333 households with total population of 2,327 (with 50.71% males and 49.29% females), based on 2011 census. Total area of village is 16.64 km^{2}. There is one primary school in Lasariya village.
