= Nainasya =

- village
- Location in Rajasthan, India Nainasya (India)
- Coordinates: 26.51551°N 75.49006°E
- Country: India
- State: Rajasthan
- District: Jaipur
- Talukas: Phagi

Area
  - Total: 3.36 km^{2} (1.30 sq mi)
- Elevation: 383 m (1,257 ft)

Population
  - Total: 594
  - Density: 177/km^{2} (460/sq mi)

Languages
  - Official: Hindi
- Time zone: UTC+5:30 (IST)
- PIN: 303005
- Telephone code: 911430
- ISO 3166 code: RJ-IN
- Vehicle registration: RJ-
- Lok Sabha constituency: Ajmer
- Vidhan Sabha constituency: Dudu
- Distance from Phagi: 13 kilometres (8.1 mi) South (RJ SH 12)
- Distance from Malpura: 33 kilometres (21 mi) North (RJ SH 12)

Nainasya (also known as Maharajpura) is a patwar circle and village in ILRC Nimera in Phagi Tehsil in Jaipur district, Rajasthan. Nainasya (Including chittar ji patel ki dhani)is also a patwar circle for nearby villages, Gadooda and Sirsya.

In Nainasya, there are 82 households with total population of 594 (with 54.38% males and 45.62% females), based on 2011 census. Total area of village is 3.36 km^{2}. There is one primary school in Nainasya village.
