= Chainpura, Bharatpura =

Chainpura
- village
- Location in Rajasthan, India Chainpura (India)
- Coordinates: 26.63012°N 75.44183°E
- Country: India
- State: Rajasthan
- District: Jaipur
- Talukas: Phagi

Area
  - Total: 2.47 km^{2} (0.95 sq mi)
- Elevation: 383 m (1,257 ft)

Population
  - Total: 354
  - Density: 143/km^{2} (370/sq mi)

Languages
  - Official: Hindi
- Time zone: UTC+5:30 (IST)
- PIN: 303005
- Telephone code: 911430
- ISO 3166 code: RJ-IN
- Lok Sabha constituency: Ajmer
- Vidhan Sabha constituency: Dudu
- Distance from Phagi: 10 kilometres (6.2 mi) West (land)
- Distance from Dudu: 30 kilometres (19 mi) East (land)

Chainpura (also known as Bharatpura) is a village in Shankarpura patwar circle in North-West region in Phagi Tehsil in Jaipur district, Rajasthan.

In Chainpura, there are 57 households with total population of 354 (with 54.52% males and 45.48% females), based on 2011 census. Total area of village is 2.47 km^{2}. There is one primary school in Shankarpura village.
