= Keriya, Phagi =

Keriya
- village
- Location in Rajasthan, India Keriya (India)
- Coordinates: 26.50537°N 75.53367°E
- Country: India
- State: Rajasthan
- District: Jaipur
- Talukas: Phagi

Area
  - Total: 5.59 km^{2} (2.16 sq mi)
- Elevation: 383 m (1,257 ft)

Population
  - Total: 536
  - Density: 96/km^{2} (250/sq mi)

Languages
  - Official: Hindi
- Time zone: UTC+5:30 (IST)
- PIN: 303005
- Telephone code: 911430
- ISO 3166 code: RJ-IN
- Lok Sabha constituency: Ajmer
- Vidhan Sabha constituency: Dudu
- Distance from Phagi: 12 kilometres (7.5 mi) South (RJ SH 12)
- Distance from Malpura: 33 kilometres (21 mi) North (RJ SH 12)

Keriya (also known as Dwarkanathpura) is a patwar circle and village in ILRC Nimera in Phagi Tehsil in Jaipur district, Rajasthan. Keriya is also a patwar circle for nearby villages, Kanwarpura, Gokulpura and Madanpura.

In Keriya, there are 68 households with total population of 536 (with 52.8% males and 47.2% females), based on 2011 census. Total area of village is 5.59 km^{2}. There is one primary school in Keriya village.
