= Shankarpura =

- village
- Location in Rajasthan, India Shankarpura (India)
- Coordinates: 26.6254°N 75.47483°E
- Country: India
- State: Rajasthan
- District: Jaipur
- Talukas: Phagi

Government
  - Type: Panchayati raj (India)
  - Body: Gram panchayat

Area
  - Total: 8.25 km^{2} (3.19 sq mi)
- Elevation: 383 m (1,257 ft)

Population
  - Total: 917
  - Density: 111/km^{2} (290/sq mi)

Languages
  - Official: Hindi
- Time zone: UTC+5:30 (IST)
- PIN: 303005
- Telephone code: 911430
- ISO 3166 code: RJ-IN
- Vehicle registration: RJ-
- Lok Sabha constituency: Ajmer
- Vidhan Sabha constituency: Dudu
- Distance from Phagi: 10 kilometres (6.2 mi) West (land)
- Distance from Dudu: 30 kilometres (19 mi) East (land)

Shankarpura is a patwar circle and village in the northwest region of Phagi Tehsil in Jaipur district, Rajasthan, India. Shankarpura is also a patwar circle for nearby village, Chainpura, Bharatpura.

In Shankarpura, there are 105 households with total population of 917 (with 51.58% males and 48.42% females), based on 2011 census. Total area of village is 8.25 km^{2}. There is one primary school in Shankarpura village.
