= Datooli =

- village
- Location in Rajasthan, India Datooli (India)
- Coordinates: 26.59755°N 75.62812°E
- Country: India
- State: Rajasthan
- District: Jaipur
- Talukas: Phagi

Area
  - Total: 7.99 km^{2} (3.08 sq mi)
- Elevation: 383 m (1,257 ft)

Population
  - Total: 1,322
  - Density: 165/km^{2} (430/sq mi)

Languages
  - Official: Hindi
- Time zone: UTC+5:30 (IST)
- PIN: 303006
- Telephone code: 911430
- ISO 3166 code: RJ-IN
- Lok Sabha constituency: Ajmer
- Vidhan Sabha constituency: Dudu
- Distance from Jaipur: 44 kilometres (27 mi) North (land)
- Distance from Phagi: 11 kilometres (6.8 mi) East (land)

Datooli is a village in Bhojpura patwar circle in Phagi Tehsil in Jaipur district, Rajasthan.

In Datooli, there are 220 households with total population of 1,322 (with 50.38% males and 49.62% females), based on 2011 census. Total area of village is 7.99 km^{2}. There is one primary school in Datooli village.
