= Chakwara =

- village
- Location in Rajasthan, India Chakwara (India)
- Coordinates: 26.61021°N 75.51315°E
- Country: India
- State: Rajasthan
- District: Jaipur
- Talukas: Phagi

Area
  - Total: 23.91 km^{2} (9.23 sq mi)
- Elevation: 383 m (1,257 ft)

Population
  - Total: 3,824
  - Density: 160/km^{2} (410/sq mi)

Languages
  - Official: Hindi
- Time zone: UTC+5:30 (IST)
- PIN: 303005
- Telephone code: 911430
- ISO 3166 code: RJ-IN
- Lok Sabha constituency: Ajmer
- Vidhan Sabha constituency: Dudu
- Distance from Phagi: 4 kilometres (2.5 mi) West (land)
- Distance from Chauru: 10 kilometres (6.2 mi) East (land)

Chakwara is a patwar circle and village in Phagi Tehsil in Jaipur district, Rajasthan.

In Chakwara, there are 484 households with total population of 3,824 (with 52.28% males and 47.72% females), based on 2011 census. Total area of village is 23.91 km^{2}. There are 2 primary schools and one post office in Chakwara village.
