= Kishorpura, Phagi =

Kishorpura
- village
- Location in Rajasthan, India Kishorpura (India)
- Coordinates: 26.46085°N 75.57117°E
- Country: India
- State: Rajasthan
- District: Jaipur
- Talukas: Phagi

Area
  - Total: 2.92 km^{2} (1.13 sq mi)
- Elevation: 383 m (1,257 ft)

Population
  - Total: 806
  - Density: 276/km^{2} (710/sq mi)

Languages
  - Official: Hindi
- Time zone: UTC+5:30 (IST)
- PIN: 303005
- Telephone code: 911430
- ISO 3166 code: RJ-IN
- Lok Sabha constituency: Ajmer
- Vidhan Sabha constituency: Dudu
- Distance from Phagi: 35 kilometres (22 mi) South (land)
- Distance from Malpura: 46 kilometres (29 mi) North-East (land)

Kishorpura is a patwar circle and village in ILRC Nimera in Phagi Tehsil in Jaipur district, Rajasthan. Kishorpura is also a patwar circle for nearby villages, Beer Ramchandrapura, Bimalpura, Mohanpura Rajawatan, Ramchandrapura and Lakhawas.

In Kishorpura, there are 110 households with total population of 806 (with 50.74% males and 49.26% females), based on 2011 census. Total area of village is 2.92 km^{2}. There is one primary school and one post office in Kishorpura village.
