= Chandma Kalan =

- village
- Location in Rajasthan, India Chandma Kalan (India)
- Coordinates: 26.48279°N 75.64984°E
- Country: India
- State: Rajasthan
- District: Jaipur
- Talukas: Phagi

Area
  - Total: 11.98 km^{2} (4.63 sq mi)
- Elevation: 383 m (1,257 ft)

Population
  - Total: 2,287
  - Density: 191/km^{2} (490/sq mi)

Languages
  - Official: Hindi
- Time zone: UTC+5:30 (IST)
- PIN: 303006
- Telephone code: 911430
- ISO 3166 code: RJ-IN
- Vehicle registration: RJ-
- Lok Sabha constituency: Dausa
- Vidhan Sabha constituency: Chaksu
- Distance from Phagi: 18 kilometres (11 mi) South-East (land)
- Distance from Madhorajpura: 10 kilometres (6.2 mi) South (land)

Chandma Kalan is a patwar circle and village in ILRC Madhorajpura in Phagi tehsil in Jaipur district, Rajasthan. Chandma Kalan is also a patwar circle for nearby villages, Ajnota, Unt Ka Khera, Chandarpura and Bisaloo.

In Chandma Kalan, there are 327 households with total population of 2,287 (with 50.59% males and 49.41% females), based on 2011 census.

Total area of village is 11.98 km^{2}. There are 2 primary schools and one post office in the village.
