= Dhanna =

Indian mystic poet; founder of Dhannavanshi Swami sect

Bhagat Dhanna Bairagi
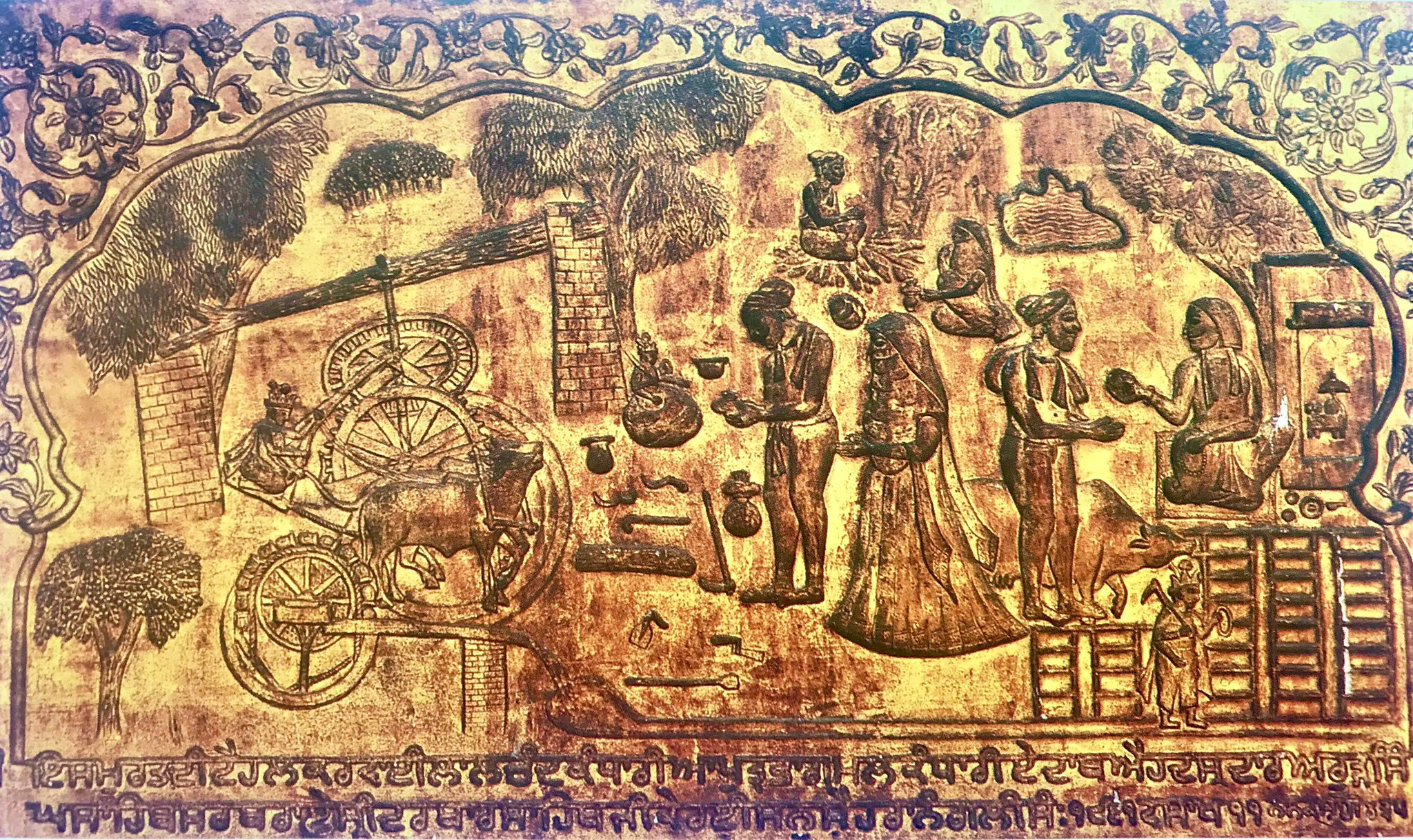
- Gilded panel made by the craftsmen of Kucha Fakirkhana depicting bhagat Dhanna the Jat and his life-story (sakhi) from Gurdwara Baba Atal Rai, Amritsar, ca.1904. .

Personal life
- Born: 20 April 1415 Chauru, Tehsil Phagi, Jaipur, Rajasthan
- Died: Early 15th century Dhuan Kalan, Tonk District, Rajasthan
- Known for: • Founder of Dhannavanshi Bairagi sect • Contributor of 3 verses in Guru Granth Sahib.
- Other name: Dhanna Bairagi Dhanna Jat
- Occupation: Farmer

Religious life
- Religion: Hinduism
- Philosophy: Vishishtadvaita
- Sect: Ramanandi Sampradaya

Religious career
- Teacher: Ramananda

Bhagat Dhanna, also known Dhanna Jat, Dhanna Jatt, Dhanna Bairagi or Sant Dhanna (born 1415), was a mystic poet and a Vaishnav devotee. His followers, who were primarily from caste-based communities, came to be known as Dhanvanshi Swamis. They are spread across various districts in Rajasthan, Punjab, and Haryana. His three hymns are present in Guru Granth Sahib.

== Early life ==
Dhanna was born in Hindu Jat family in village Chauru of Tehsil Phagi, in the Jaipur district of Rajasthan, and was a disciple of the Bhakti saint-poet Ramananda.

== Divine powers ==
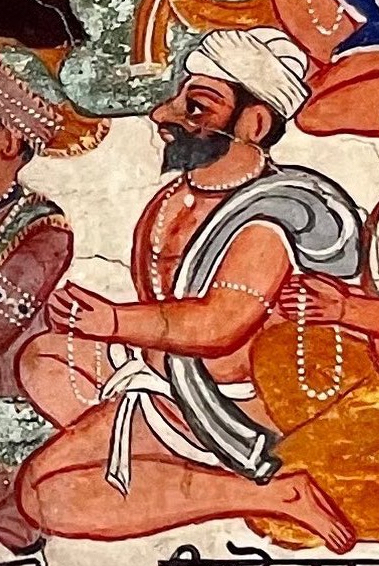
Detail of Bhagat Dhanna from a fresco, circa mid-19th century.

There are a number of mystical stories about the divine powers of Dhanna Bhagat. One such states that once he was ploughing his fields, a large number of Sannyasins (Hindu religious mendicants) came to him hungry and sought food. Dhanna Bhagat gave them all the seeds he had kept for sowing his fields, and ploughed the fields without sowing seeds. The fields produced no food grains, but gourds. When his jagirdir (feudal lord) came to collect the levy, Dhanna Bhagat offered two gourds. Surprised and insulted, the Jagirdar broke the gourds in anger, only to find that they were full of pearls. Bhakti-saint Meera refers to this story in her poem, "sun lijo binati mori, main sharan gahi prabhu teri".

== Legacy ==
Early Sikh literature claims Dharam Singh, one of the inaugural Panj Piare quintet, was the reincarnation of Bhagat Dhanna. The Dhaliwal gotra (clan) claims that Bhagat Dhanna was a Dhaliwal.

== Popular culture ==
Bhagat Dhanna Ji Temple and Gurudwara is present in Dhuan Kalan Village, Tonk District, Rajasthan

Indian filmmaker Kidar Nath Sharma made Dhanna Bhagat (1945) which starred Kamal Zamindar in the title role. In 1974, Bhagat Dhanna Jatt, an Indian Punjabi-language film starring Dara Singh, was released.

== Gallery ==
- Hindal
