= Hatheli =

- village
- Location in Rajasthan, India Hatheli (India)
- Coordinates: 26.51528°N 75.62658°E
- Country: India
- State: Rajasthan
- District: Jaipur
- Talukas: Phagi

Area
  - Total: 10.94 km^{2} (4.22 sq mi)
- Elevation: 383 m (1,257 ft)

Population
  - Total: 619
  - Density: 57/km^{2} (150/sq mi)

Languages
  - Official: Hindi
- Time zone: UTC+5:30 (IST)
- PIN: 303005
- Telephone code: 911430
- ISO 3166 code: RJ-IN
- Lok Sabha constituency: Ajmer
- Vidhan Sabha constituency: Dudu
- Distance from Phagi: 11 kilometres (6.8 mi) South-East (land)
- Distance from Madhorajpura: 7 kilometres (4.3 mi) South (land)

Hatheli (also known as Harsundarpura) is a patwar circle and village in ILRC Nimera in Phagi Tehsil in Jaipur district, Rajasthan. Hatheli is also a patwar circle for nearby villages, Nathmalpura and Ratanpura.

In Hatheli, there are 100 households with total population of 619 (with 53.47% males and 46.53% females), based on 2011 census. Total area of village is 10.94 km^{2}. There is one primary school in Hatheli village.
