= Bhojpura =

- village
- Location in Rajasthan, India Bhojpura (India) Bhojpura (India)
- Coordinates: 26.62203°N 75.61357°E
- Country: India
- State: Rajasthan
- District: Jaipur
- Talukas: Phagi

Government
  - Type: Panchayati raj (India)
  - Body: Gram panchayat

Area
  - Total: 9.53 km^{2} (3.68 sq mi)
- Elevation: 383 m (1,257 ft)

Population
  - Total: 1,451
  - Density: 152/km^{2} (390/sq mi)

Languages
  - Official: Hindi
- Time zone: UTC+5:30 (IST)
- PIN: 303005
- Telephone code: 911430
- ISO 3166 code: RJ-IN
- Vehicle registration: RJ-
- Lok Sabha constituency: Ajmer
- Vidhan Sabha constituency: Dudu
- Distance from Jaipur: 43 kilometres (27 mi) South (land)
- Distance from Phagi: 8 kilometres (5.0 mi) North (land)

Bhojpura is a patwar circle and village in Phagi Tehsil in Jaipur district, Rajasthan, India. As a patwar circle, it includes the nearby village of Datooli.

At the 2011 Census of India, Bhojpura was reported to have 220 households and a population of 1,451 (with 51.83% males and 48.17% females). The total area of village is 9.53 square kilometres (3.68 mi^{2}).

There is one primary school in Bhojpura village.
