= Parwan, Phagi =

Parwan
- village
- Location in Rajasthan, India Parwan (India)
- Coordinates: 26.50637°N 75.60735°E
- Country: India
- State: Rajasthan
- District: Jaipur
- Talukas: Phagi

Area
  - Total: 6.26 km^{2} (2.42 sq mi)
- Elevation: 383 m (1,257 ft)

Population
  - Total: 760
  - Density: 121/km^{2} (310/sq mi)

Languages
  - Official: Hindi
- Time zone: UTC+5:30 (IST)
- PIN: 303005
- Telephone code: 911430
- ISO 3166 code: RJ-IN
- Lok Sabha constituency: Ajmer
- Vidhan Sabha constituency: Dudu
- Distance from Phagi: 11 kilometres (6.8 mi) South-East (land)
- Distance from Malpura: 50 kilometres (31 mi) North-East (land)

Parwan is a patwar circle and village in ILRC Nimera in Phagi Tehsil in Jaipur district, Rajasthan. Parwan is also a patwar circle for nearby villages, Khandooj, Dhunwaliya, Panwasoo Khera, Barh Mordi and Mordi.

In Parwan, there are 116 households with total population of 760 (with 54.34% males and 45.66% females), based on 2011 census. Total area of village is 6.26 km^{2}. There is one primary school in Parwan village.
