= Sameliya =

- village
- Location in Rajasthan, India Sameliya (India)
- Coordinates: 26.44245°N 75.59152°E
- Country: India
- State: Rajasthan
- District: Jaipur
- Talukas: Phagi

Area
  - Total: 11.8 km^{2} (4.6 sq mi)
- Elevation: 383 m (1,257 ft)

Population
  - Total: 975
  - Density: 83/km^{2} (210/sq mi)

Languages
  - Official: Hindi
- Time zone: UTC+5:30 (IST)
- PIN: 303005
- Telephone code: 911430
- ISO 3166 code: RJ-IN
- Lok Sabha constituency: Ajmer
- Vidhan Sabha constituency: Dudu
- Distance from Phagi: 27 kilometres (17 mi) South (land)
- Distance from Malpura: 38 kilometres (24 mi) North-East (land)

Sameliya is a patwar circle and village in ILRC Nimera in Phagi Tehsil in Jaipur district, Rajasthan. Sameliya is also a patwar circle for nearby villages, Chandama Khurd and Mandap.

In Sameliya, there are 164 households with total population of 975 (with 52.72% males and 47.28% females), based on 2011 census. Total area of village is 11.8 km^{2}. There is one primary school in Sameliya village.
