= Madhorajpura =

Madhorajpura Mini Pink City
- village
- Location in Rajasthan, India Madhorajpura (India)
- Coordinates: 26.583333°N 75.65°E
- Country: India
- State: Rajasthan
- District: Jaipur
- Talukas: Phagi

Area
  - Total: 19.49 km^{2} (7.53 sq mi)
- Elevation: 383 m (1,257 ft)

Population
  - Total: 4,690
  - Density: 241/km^{2} (620/sq mi)

Languages
  - Official: Hindi
- Time zone: UTC+5:30 (IST)
- PIN: 303006
- Telephone code: 911430
- ISO 3166 code: RJ-IN
- Lok Sabha constituency: Dausa
- Vidhan Sabha constituency: Chaksu
- Distance from Jaipur: 48 kilometres (30 mi) South (land)
- Distance from Chandma Kalan: 9 kilometres (5.6 mi) North (land)
- Distance from Phagi: 10 kilometres (6.2 mi) East (land)
- Distance from Chaksu: 35 kilometres (22 mi) West (land)

Madhorajpura, is an ILRC and village in Phagi Tahsil in Jaipur district, Rajasthan. It has a population of around 5000. Madhorajpura has eight patwar circles - Gopalpura, Chandma Kalan, Didawata, Dosara, Beechi, Bhankarota, Madhorajpura and Sehdariya

Based on 2011 census, Madhorajpura has 734 households with total population of 4,690 (51.81% males, 48.19% females). Total area of village is 19.49 km^{2}. There are 5 primary schools and one post office in the village.

== Villages in Madhorajpura panchayat samiti ==
Patwar circle	Village
DABICH	DABICH
DABICH	Gopalpura
DABICH	Shri Ramjipura
Chandma Kalan	Anrota
Chandma Kalan	Unt Ka Khera
Chandma Kalan	Bisalu
Chandma Kalan	Chandma Kalan
Chandma Kalan	Chandarpura
Didawata	Didawata
Didawata	Bhanpura
Didawata	Mukand Pura
Didawata	Nohara
Didawata	Hanootiya Kalan
Didawata	Hanootiya Khurd
Dosara	Govindpura in Mandaliya
Dosara	Dousra kurd
Dosara	Mandaliya Naveen
Dosara	Prempura
Bhankarota	Bhankarota
Bhankarota	Jugal Kishorpura
Jharana
Jharana Khurd
Jhonpariya
Bhankarota Maliyan
Madhorajpura	Khera Hanumanji
Madhorajpura	Madhorajpura
Jharla	Mandaliya Jogan
Jharla	Kantoli
Jharla	khijuriya
Jharla	Bhojpura
Datili
Jharla
