= Renwal =

- village
- Location in Rajasthan, India Renwal (India)
- Coordinates: 26.69597°N 75.67366°E
- Country: India
- State: Rajasthan
- District: Jaipur
- Talukas: Phagi

Area
  - Total: 20.26 km^{2} (7.82 sq mi)
- Elevation: 383 m (1,257 ft)

Population
  - Total: 6,198
  - Density: 306/km^{2} (790/sq mi)

Languages
  - Official: Hindi
- Time zone: UTC+5:30 (IST)
- PIN: 303603
- Telephone code: 911430
- ISO 3166 code: RJ-IN
- Lok Sabha constituency: Dausa
- Vidhan Sabha constituency: Chaksu
- Distance from Jaipur: 33 kilometres (21 mi) South (land)
- Distance from Malpura: 59 kilometres (37 mi) North (land)

Renwal is an ILRC and village in Phagi Tehsil in Jaipur district, Rajasthan, India.

Renwal has seven patwar circles: Gopal Nagar, Gohandi, Thala, Mohabbatpura, Renwal, Harsooliya and Heerapura.

Based on the Census of India, 2011, Renwal has 842 households with total population of 6,198 (52.02% males, 47.98% females). Total area of village is 20.26km^{2}. There is one primary school, one commercial bank and one post office in the village.

There is a temple dedicated to Hanuman.

== Villages in Renwal ==
Patwar circle	Village
Gopal Nagar	Barh-Bishanpura @ Kagya
Gopal Nagar	Gopal Nagar
Gopal Nagar	Balapura
Gohandi	Amarpura
Gohandi	Katariya @ Madanmohanpura
Gohandi	Gohandi
Gohandi	Chak Gulabpura
Gohandi	Nawal Kishorpura
Gohandi	Raithal
Thala	Jaichand Ka Bas
Thala	Thala
Thala	Mohanpura Prithvisingh
Mohabbatpura	Ganeshpura
Mohabbatpura	Dabla Khurd
Mohabbatpura	Dabla Bujurg
Mohabbatpura	Mohabbatpura
Renwal	Daloowala
Renwal	Beer Ramchandrapura
Renwal	Renwal
Harsooliya	Khejra Ka Bas
Harsooliya	Raipura
Harsooliya	Harsooliya
Heerapura	Karwa
Heerapura	Kishanpura
Heerapura	Gulabpura
Heerapura	Jankinathpura
Heerapura	Jabar
Heerapura	Nihalpura @ Miya Ka Barh
Heerapura	Rampura @ Chokhawala
Heerapura	Hari Rampura
Heerapura	Heerapura
