= Marwar painting =

Rajasthani style of Indian painting

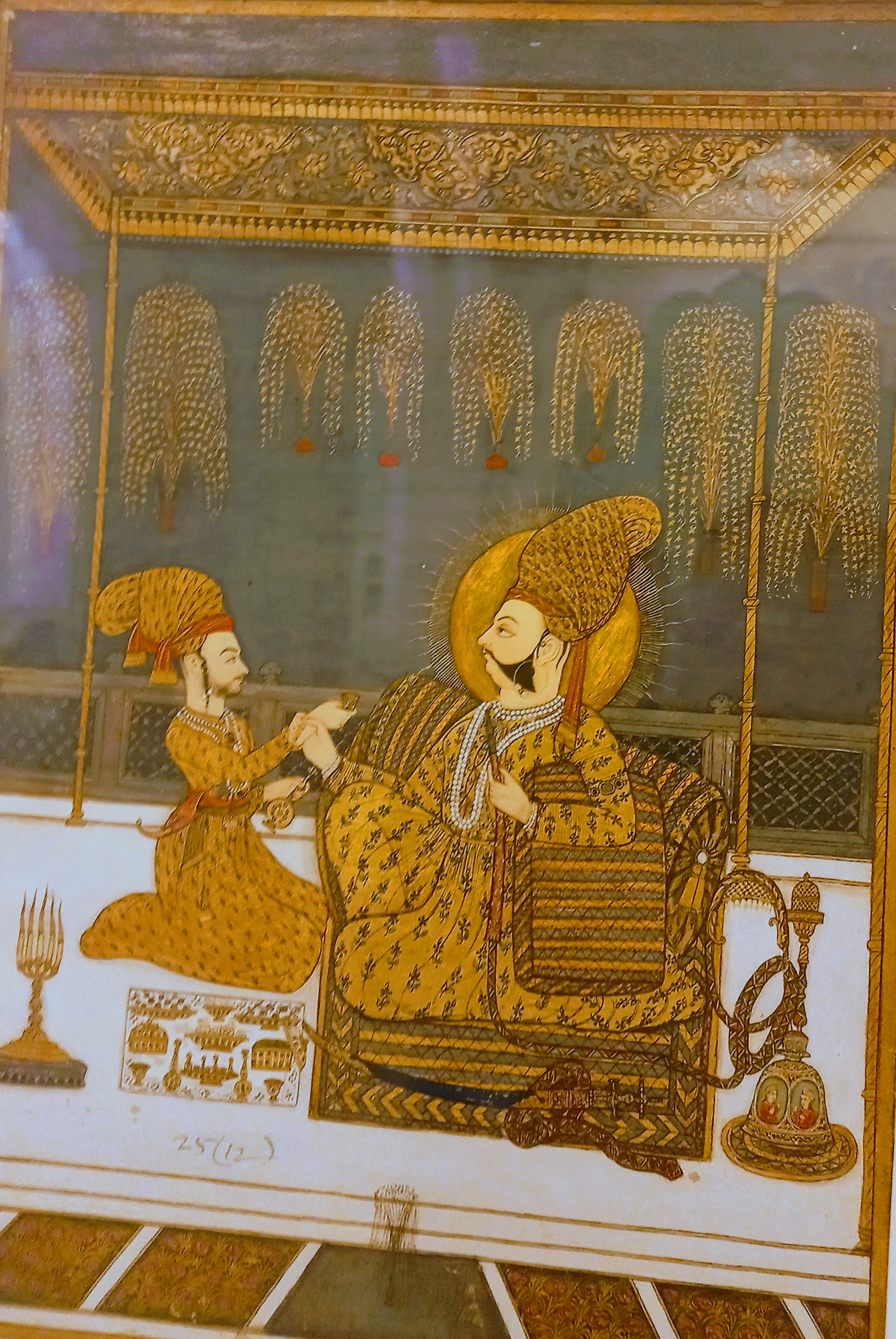
Maharaja Ram singh celebrating Diwali with a companion

Marwar painting is a traditional form of Indian painting that originated in the city of Jodhpur in the Indian state of Rajasthan. Even though it emerged under the larger umbrella of Rajput painting, Marwar School created an original style as it was partly influenced by Mughal art and showcased many original elements. Marwar school of painting manifested distinct style, content, and techniques of its own that incorporated local knowledge.

Marwar state is located on the West of Aravali Mountains. Marwar is a term that has emerged from the word marupradesh or land of the dead. It signifies the harsh conditions of Thar desert. The desert land and the ensuing difficult life is interspersed with cultural art forms to add joy to harsh lives. Marwar has a distinct cultural idiom, and thus had developed a distinct school of painting. The painting tradition is generally traced back to the 17th century, when the rulers of Jodhpur, the Rathores, patronized the art form. It was also influenced by the traditions already existing in the region.

== History ==
It is said that the Rathore rulers patronized artists from many parts of India, and their interaction with local artists and art forms led to the development of unique style, which came to be known as Marwar painting.

=== Early influences ===
The earliest influence on Marwar style can be traced to the murals of Ajanta, of which, the door of Mandor is the finest example. According to Tarachand, this style is related to Sringdhar which traces the origin of Marwar style to the confluence of local art styles and Ajanta frescoes. Marwar School was initially influenced by Mewar School also but through illustrations of Jain manuscripts, Marwar came to be acknowledged as a separate school (1532 – 68). As early as 1519, manuscripts of Uttradhayayana Sutra was painted in this style, which is now in the collection of Baroda Museum. It also shows a relationship with Gujarat as the titles of the paintings are given in Gujarati language and script.

=== Royal patronage and Mughal influence ===
Because of the Mughal influence, the Marwar miniatures were inspired by their art. We can see the influence in the Bhagawat of 1610 in which Arjuna's and Krishna's costumes are just like Mughals, but the facial features envision a Rajput noble. The Gopis or female companions of Krishna are dressed akin to women of Marwar but the elaborate ornaments adorning them betray Mughal imperial grandeur.

Maharaja Jaswant Singh (1626 – 1678) ushered in great activity in the field of painting. Court life, royal portraits, and Krishna related themes were most popular during his time. The history of royal patronage is reflected in the choice of subjects of the paintings. During the era of Aurangzeb and Ajit Singh, a lot of paintings influenced by Mughal subjects were painted. The mythological and lyrical paintings were made at the time of Vijay Singh and Man Singh, in which Panchatantra Suknasika character and Nath character were frequently put in centerstage. Many of these paintings can be now seen in the Maharaja's Pustak Prakash Library and quite a few are periodically displayed in the Mehrangarh Fort Museum, Jodhpur. Man Singh was a follower of Nath cult and an illustrated manuscript of Nathacharita was prepared under his patronage.

== Style ==
The Jodhpur style, which developed in the 18th-century, is characterized by its bold lines and use of primary colors. Due to local influence red and yellow colours were favourably used. The use of costumes and jamas were the result of Mughal influence. The men wore high turbans and ladies using red dotted dresses. In the paintings, artists have used a lot of golden colour because of the influence of Mughal art. Majority of the bodies are short and the hands rounded and flower knob is characteristic feature of female jewellery. They had also done detailed study of different parts of the body.

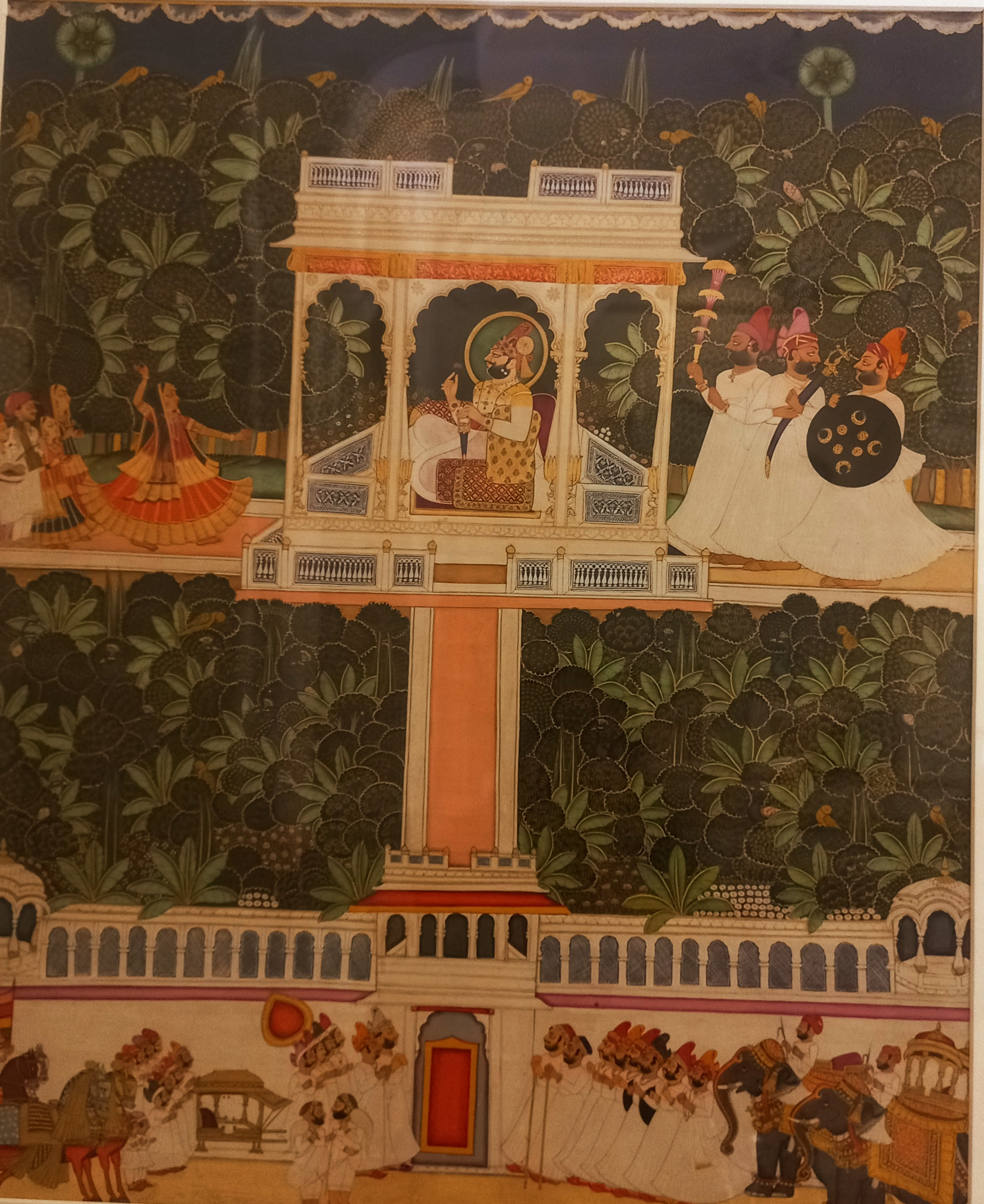
Maharaja Man Singh as a connoisseur of music and dance

=== Technique ===
Marwar painting is typically done on paper, cloth, or walls using natural colors made from mineral and vegetable sources. The artists use a fine brush made of squirrel hair to create intricate designs, which often depict scenes from Hindu mythology, local folklore, and historical events.

=== Themes ===
Marwar painting is known for its rich iconography, which includes deities, animals, birds, and plants. The paintings often depict scenes from the Ramayana and Mahabharata, as well as local legends and folktales. The artists also draw inspiration from nature, incorporating images of birds, flowers, and other natural elements into their work. Sociological subjects were quite popular in eighteenth century in this style. Character of Panchatantra and Suknasika, potter, washerman, labourer, wood-cutter, hunter, barber, waterman, goldsmith, businessman, panibarin, milkman, gardener, farmer and their related lives were painted frequently. The traditional Ragamala paintings were also commons subjects. Drawings of places, forts, and majestic buildings catered to the royal taste but the depiction of scenery catered to the taste of Marwari capitalists.

== Contribution to heritage ==
Marwar painting of Jodhpur is an important part of the cultural heritage of Rajasthan. The paintings are highly valued by collectors and art enthusiasts and are an important source of income for the artists and their families. Artists trained at the courts of the Mughal emperors introduced the Jodhpur artists to the classical concepts of portraiture and composition.

=== Schools and subschools ===
Located near the Marwar border, Devgarh Thikana, though situated in Mewar borders, show a deep impact of Marwar style. The grandeur of the Marwar school of painting was well-expressed in Jodhpur style. Alongside this, Bikaner style emerged from it as an independent school while Kishangarh style became world renowned. Substyles of Jaisalmer, Nagaur, Sirohi, Ghanerao, also became distinct. Many temples of the region have murals beside the more popular miniature art. Marwar murals are simple in execution as well as in arrangement and have used the stucco technique as well as tempera.

== Gallery ==
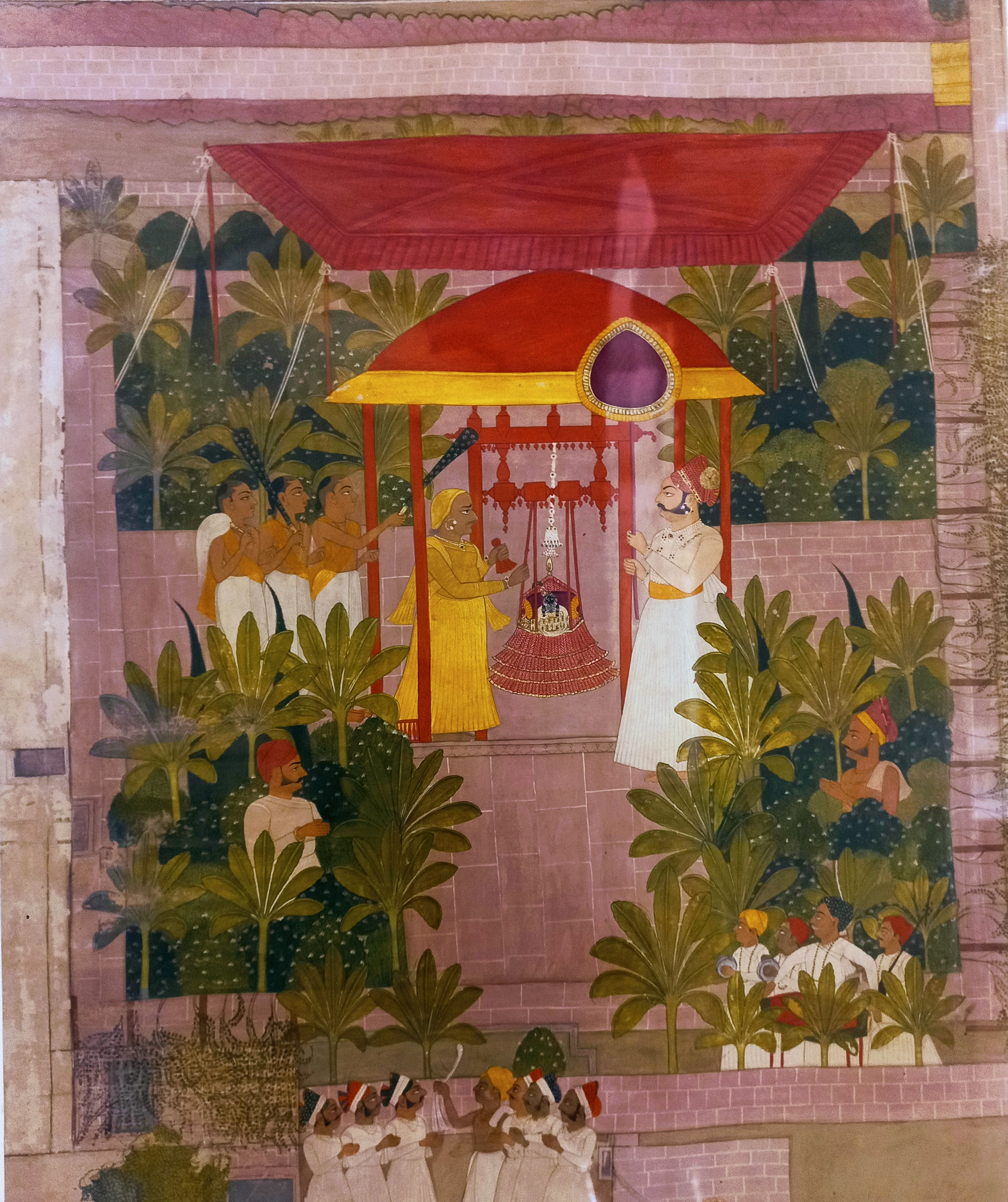
Maharaja Vijai Singh worshipping Krishna

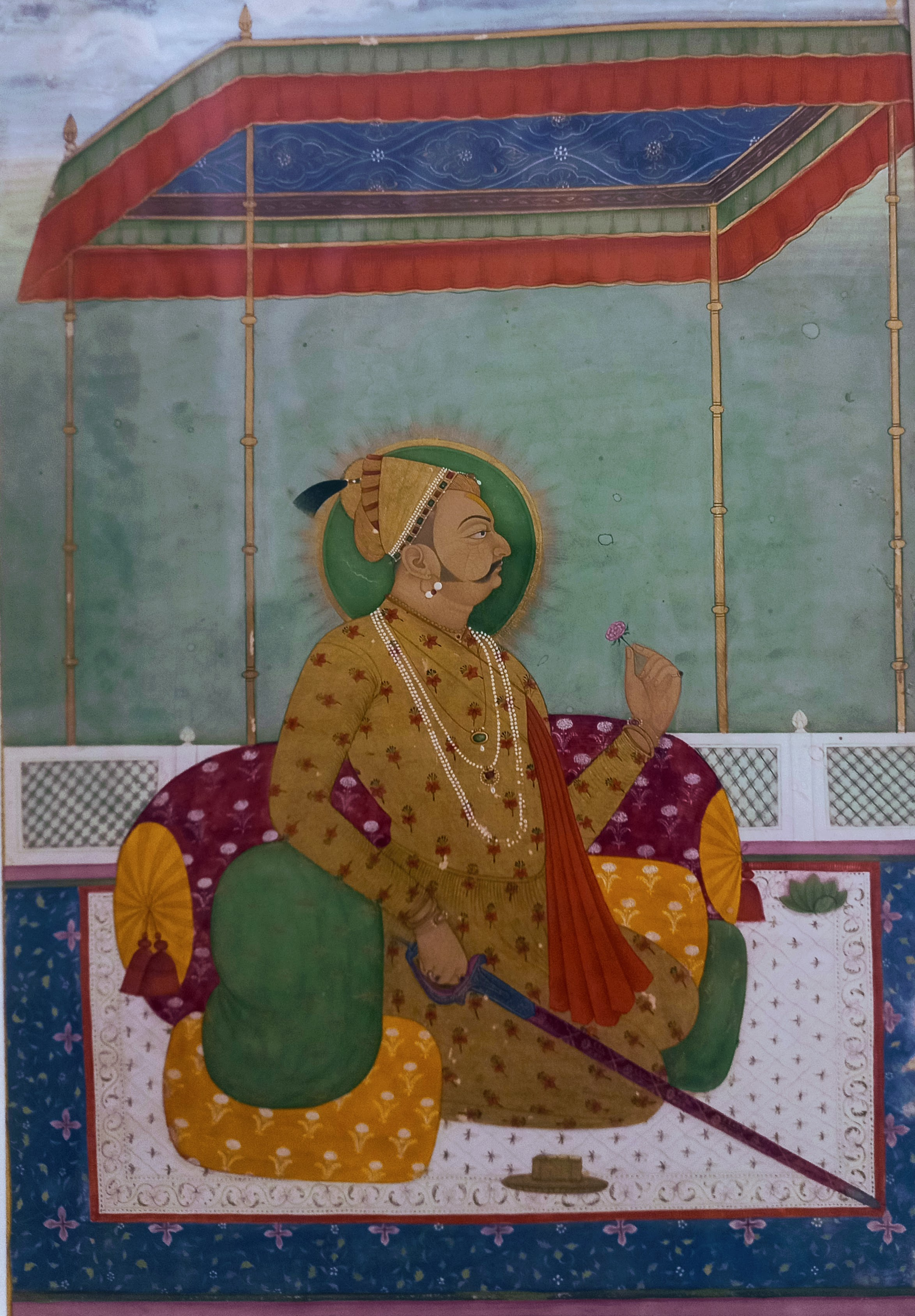
Portrait of Maharaja Ajit Singh

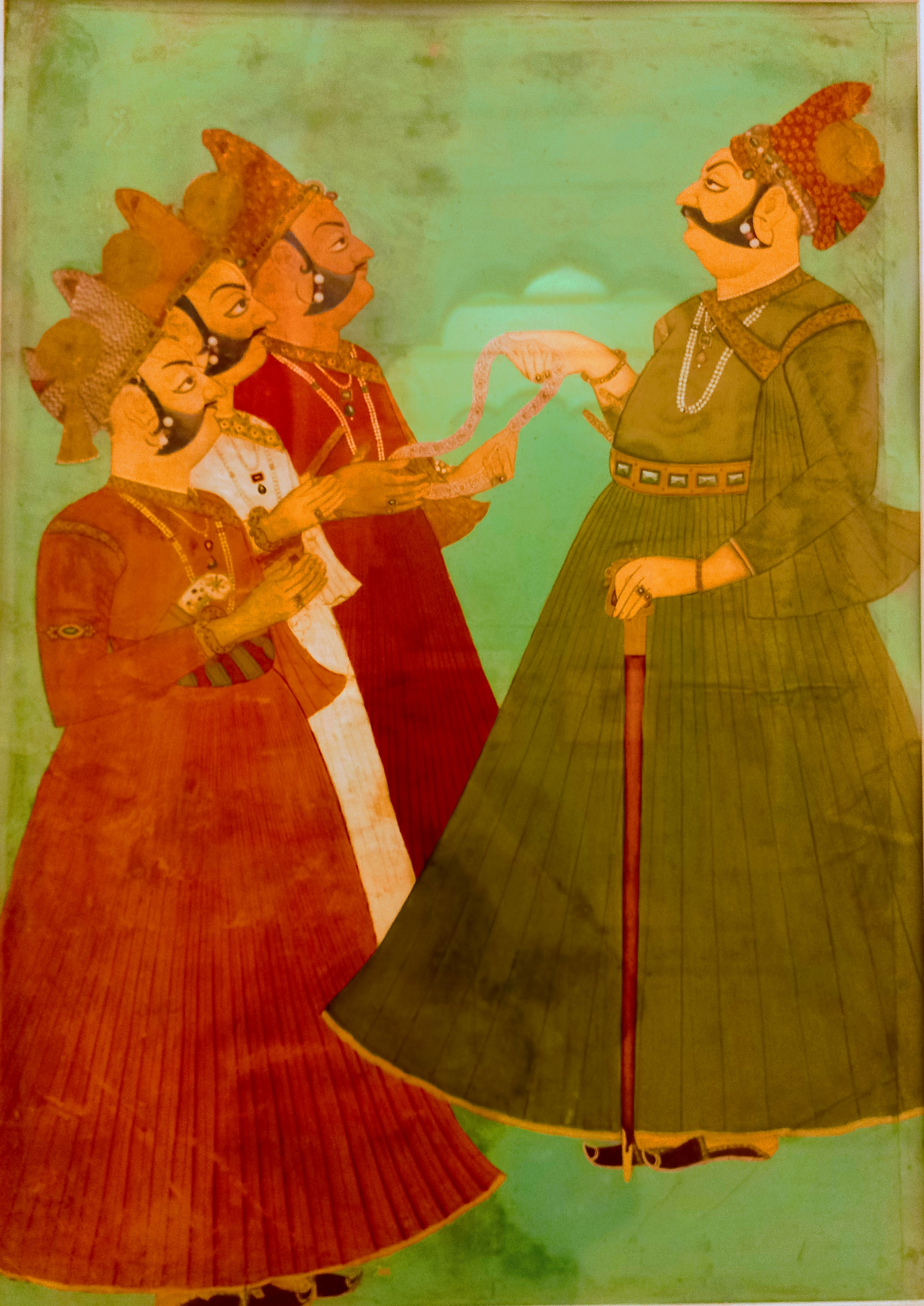
Maharaja Vijai Singh presenting a garland to his son Fateh Singh

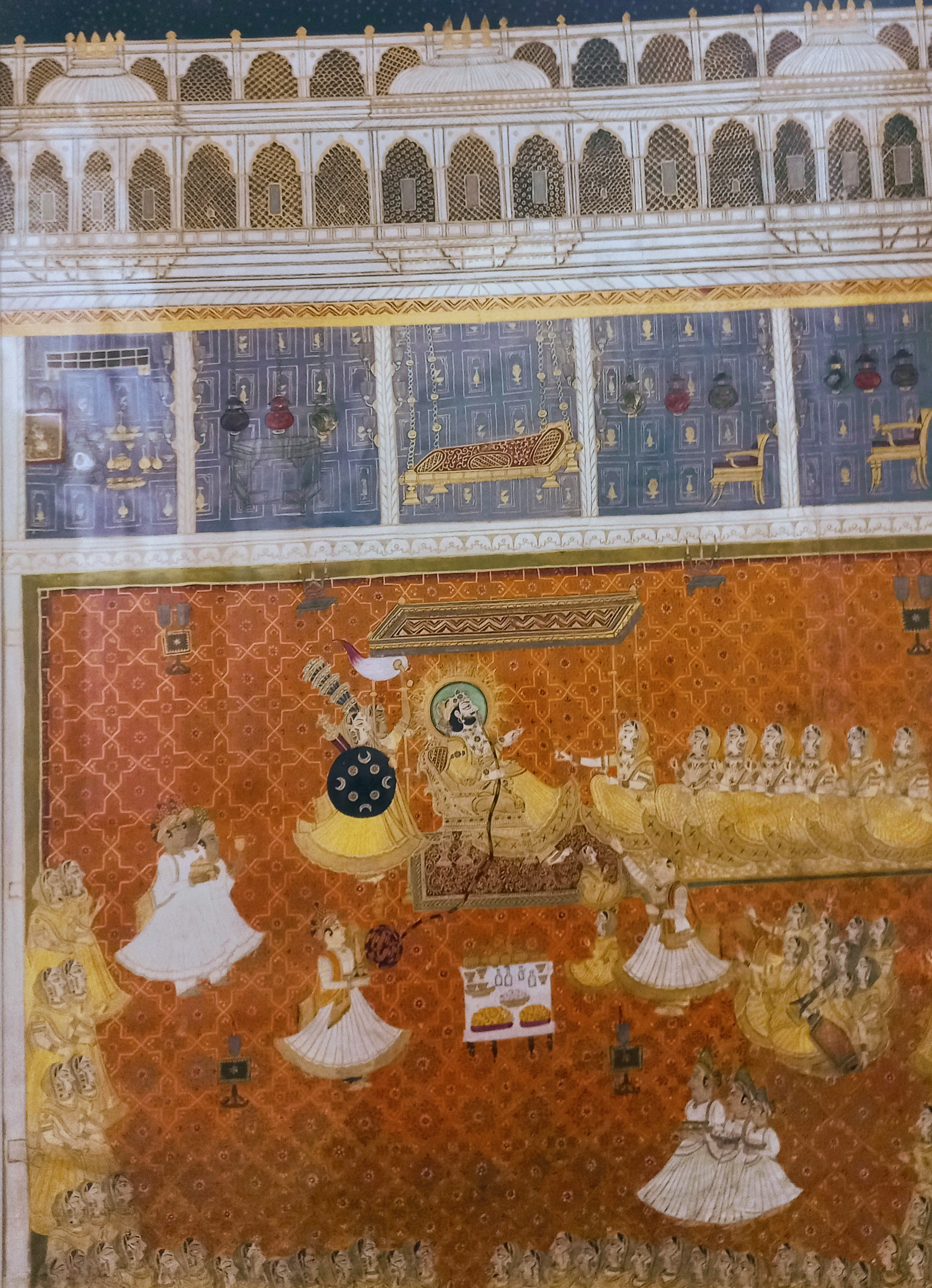
A celebration in the zenana

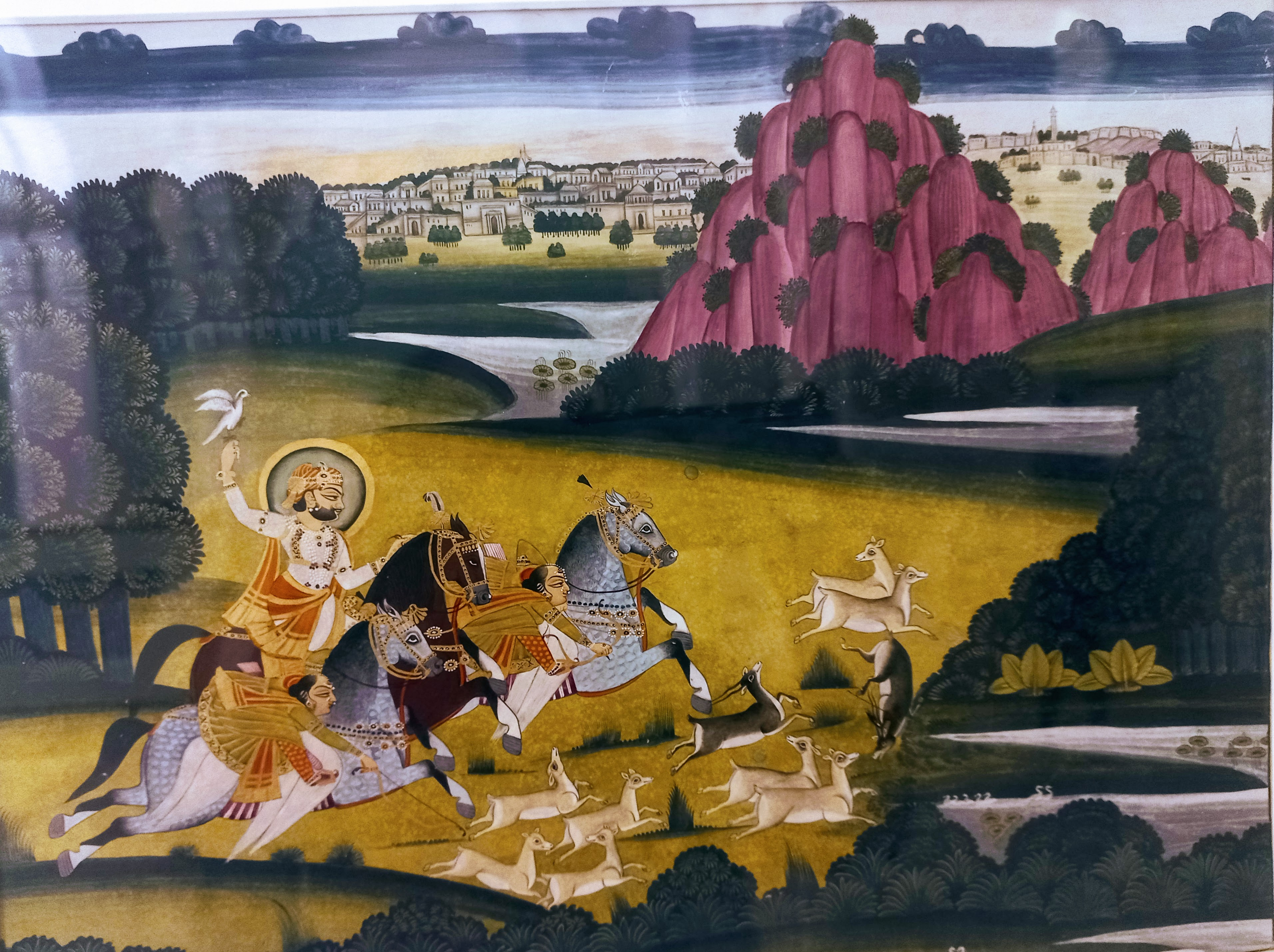
A royal party out on a hunt

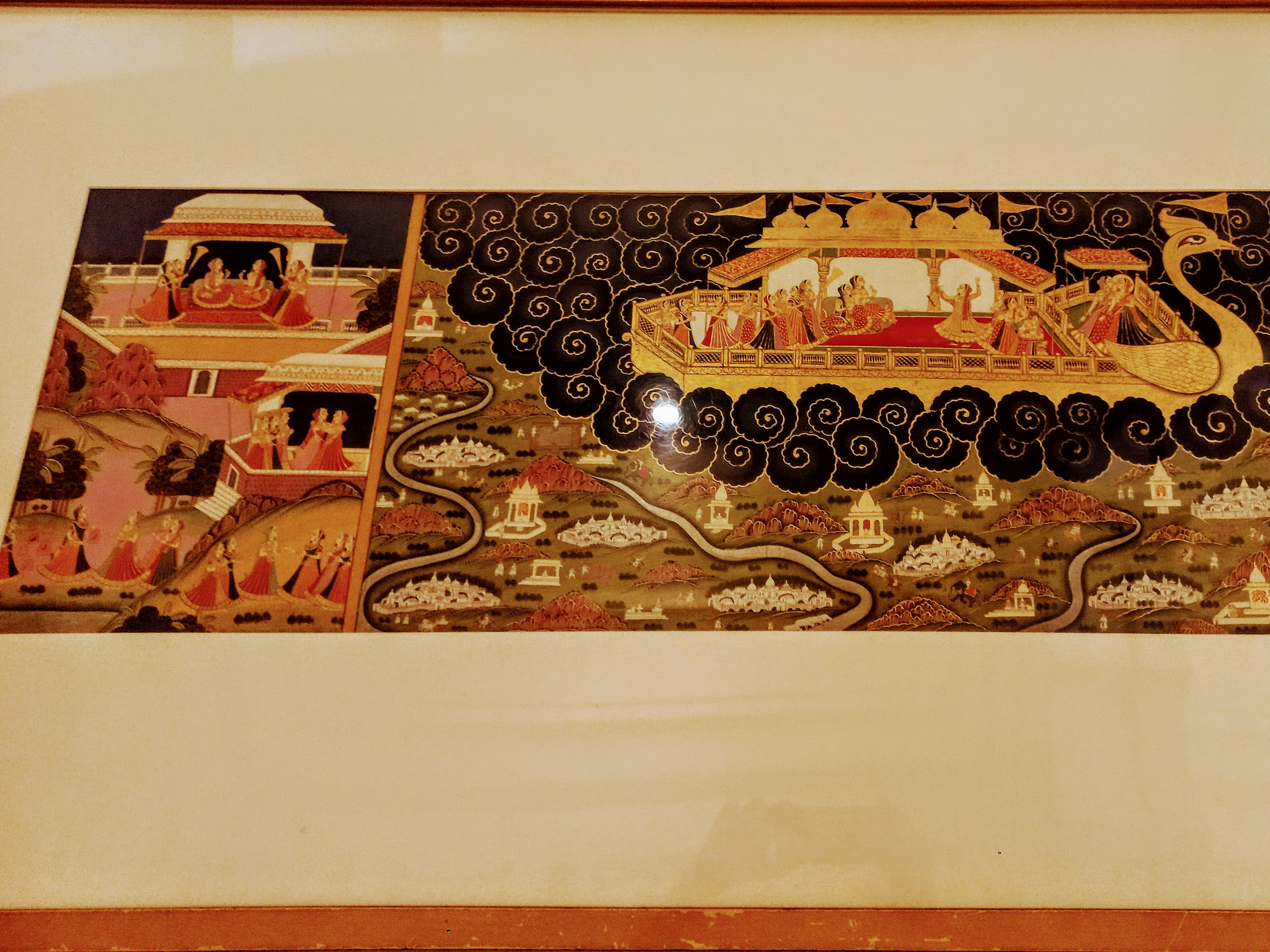
Parvati and her mother Mena view Kailasha from a Vimana

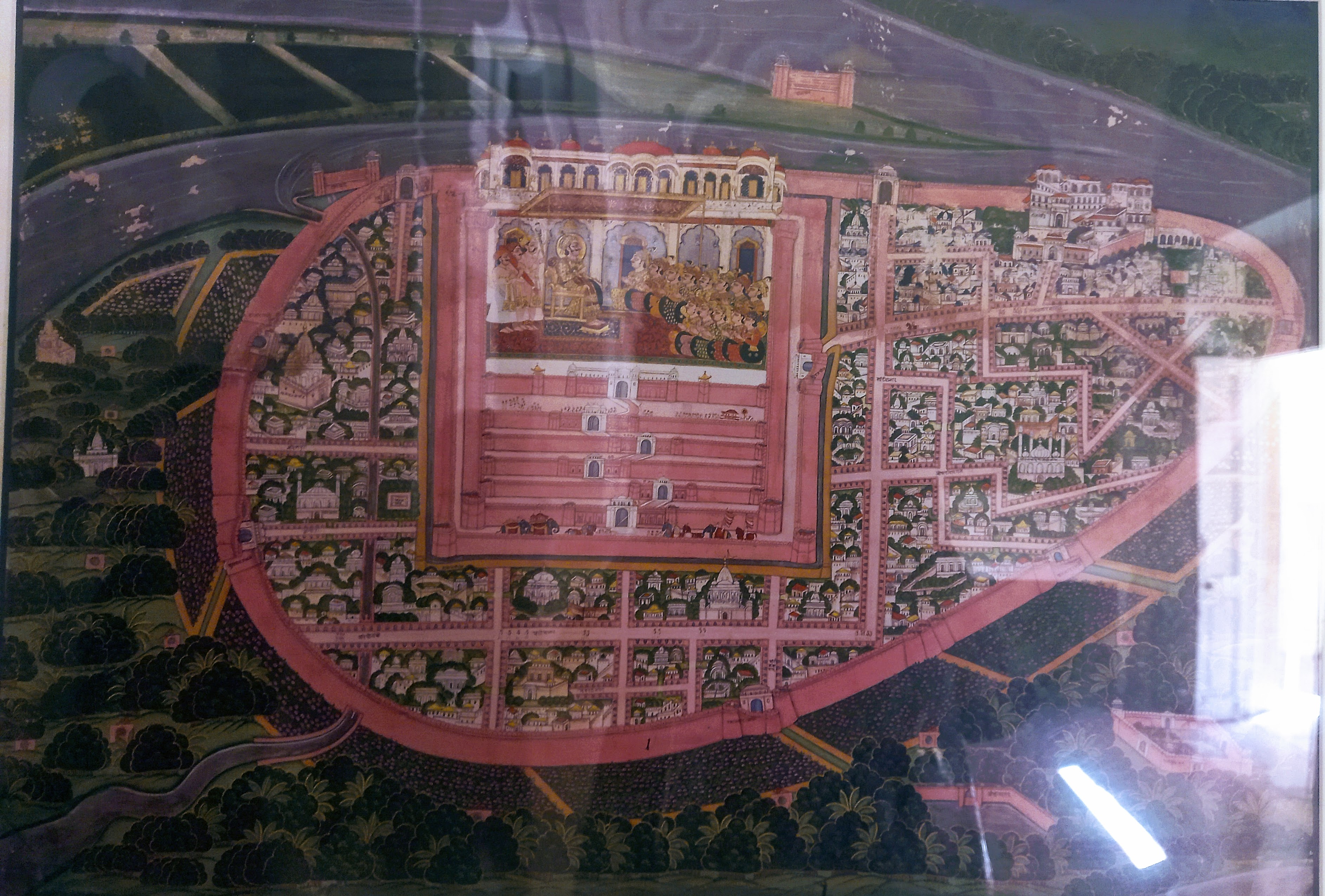
The City of Kannauj
