= Nevta Dam =

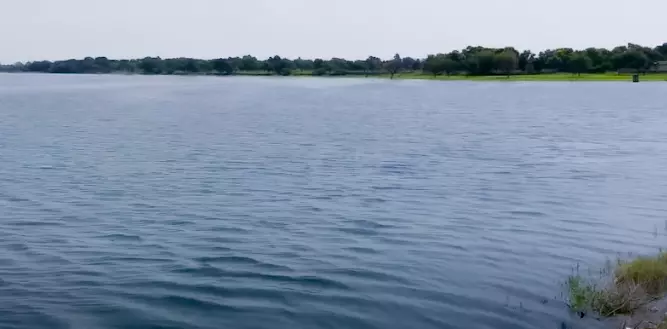

- Location within Rajasthan Location within India
- Official name: नेवटा बांध
- Country: India
- Location: Sanganer, Jaipur district in Rajasthan
- Coordinates: 26°48′14.7″N 75°40′56.1″E

Nevta (also known as Neota, in hindi नेवटा ) Dam is located in the Sanganer Tehsil of Jaipur district in Rajasthan, India.

The total catchment area of the dam is 443,583 ha (1,096,120 acres) and it has a storage capacity at the 16 ft (4.9 m) gauge marker of 236.72×10^{6} cu ft (6.703×10^{6} m^{3}).

On average, approximately 150 birds, including the uncommon Lesser Whistling-Duck and the widespread Eastern Cattle Egret, have been seen each year on the eastern side of Nevta Dam. This diverse habitat attracts both common and less frequent visitors, contributing to a total of 196 bird species recorded here so far.

The dam is situated 5 km (3.1 mi) from Muhana and 13 km (8.1 mi) from Mansarovar. The Special Economic Zone (SEZ) called Mahindra World City Jaipur is 3.6 km (2.2 mi) away. This dam is named after the adjacent village of Nevta.

== See also ==
- List of Dams and Reservoirs in India
