= Prem Chand Bairwa =

Indian politician (born 1969)

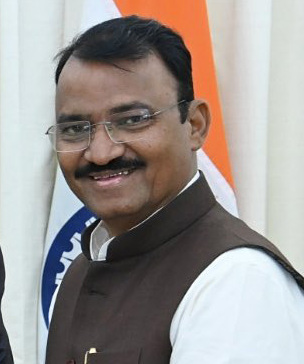
- Dr Bairwa in 2023

Deputy Chief Minister of Rajasthan
- Incumbent
- Assumed office 15 December 2023 Serving with Diya Kumari
- Governor: Kalraj Mishra Haribhau Bagade
- Chief Minister: Bhajan Lal Sharma
- Ministry and Departments: List: Higher and Technical Education; Road Transport and Highways; Ayurveda, Yoga and Naturopathy
- Preceded by: Sachin Pilot (2020)

Member of Rajasthan Legislative Assembly
- Incumbent
- Assumed office 3 December 2023
- Preceded by: Babulal Nagar
- Constituency: Dudu
- In office 8 December 2013 – 11 December 2018
- Preceded by: Babulal Nagar
- Succeeded by: Babulal Nagar
- Constituency: Dudu

Personal details
- Born: 31 August 1969 (age 56) Sriniwaspura, Rajasthan, India
- Party: Bharatiya Janata Party
- Spouse: Narayani Devi (m. 1981)
- Children: 4 (1 son and 3 daughters)
- Education: M.A. L.L.B; M.Phil. Ph.D.
- Alma mater: University of Rajasthan
- Occupation: Politician
- Profession: Agriculture

Prem Chand Bairwa (born 31 August 1969) is an Indian politician serving as the Deputy Chief Minister of Rajasthan since December 2023, alongside Diya Kumari, under the chief ministership of Bhajan Lal Sharma. A member of the Bharatiya Janata Party (BJP), he represents the Dudu Assembly constituency in the Rajasthan Legislative Assembly.

== Early life and education ==
Bairwa was born on 31 August 1969 in Sriniwaspura village, Mauzmabad tehsil, Jaipur district, Rajasthan.

== Political career ==
Bairwa's political career began with his membership in the Jaipur Zila Parishad. He was first elected to the Rajasthan Legislative Assembly in 2013 from the Dudu constituency as a BJP candidate. He was defeated in the 2018 assembly election but successfully contested again in 2023, defeating the incumbent Babulal Nagar.

On 15 December 2023, Bairwa was appointed one of the two Deputy Chief Ministers of Rajasthan, making him the second Dalit individual to hold this position in the state. He was assigned the portfolios of Higher and Technical Education, Road Transport and Highways, and Ayurveda, Yoga and Naturopathy.

== Personal life ==
He is married to Narayani Devi, and they have one son and three daughters.

== Electoral history ==
2023 Rajasthan Legislative Assembly Elections
Year	Constituency	Candidate	Party	Votes	Percentage	Result
2023	Dudu	Prem Chand Bairwa	BJP	116,561	57.73%	Won
2023	Dudu	Babulal Nagar	INC	80,818	40.02%	Runner-up
2023	Dudu	Hanuman Prasad Bairwa	RLP	1,742	0.86%	Lost

2018 Rajasthan Legislative Assembly Elections
Year	Constituency	Candidate	Party	Votes	Percentage	Result
2018	Dudu	Babulal Nagar	IND	68,769	38.75%	Won
2018	Dudu	Prem Chand Bairwa	BJP	53,990	30.42%	Runner-up
2018	Dudu	Ritesh Bairwa	INC	28,798	16.23%	Lost

2013 Rajasthan Legislative Assembly Elections
Year	Constituency	Candidate	Party	Votes	Percentage	Result
2013	Dudu	Prem Chand Bairwa	BJP	86,239	57.36%	Won
2013	Dudu	Babulal Nagar	INC	52,519	34.93%	Runner-up

== Succession ==
Preceded by Sachin Pilot	Deputy Chief Minister of Rajasthan; 2023–present	Incumbent

Preceded by Babulal Nagar	Member of Rajasthan Legislative Assembly for Dudu; 2013–2018	Succeeded by Babulal Nagar

Preceded by Babulal Nagar	Member of Rajasthan Legislative Assembly for Dudu; 2023–present	Incumbent
