= RNW =

RNW or rnw may refer to:

- RNW Media, an international non-governmental organisation based in Hilversum, Netherlands
- RNW, the Indian Railways station code for Renwal railway station, Rajasthan, India
- rnw, the ISO 639-3 code for Rungwa language, Tanzania
