= Chauru =

Chauru chouru
- village
- Location in Rajasthan, India Chauru (India)
- Coordinates: 26.59229°N 75.44457°E
- Country: India
- State: Rajasthan
- District: Jaipur
- Talukas: Phagi

Area
  - Total: 47.57 km^{2} (18.37 sq mi)
- Elevation: 383 m (1,257 ft)

Population
  - Total: 5,078
  - Density: 107/km^{2} (280/sq mi)

Languages
  - Official: Hindi
- Time zone: UTC+5:30 (IST)
- PIN: 303005
- Telephone code: 911430
- ISO 3166 code: RJ-IN
- Lok Sabha constituency: Ajmer
- Vidhan Sabha constituency: Dudu
- Distance from Phagi: 13 kilometres (8.1 mi) West (land)
- Distance from Dudu: 31 kilometres (19 mi) East (land)

Chauru is an ILRC and village in Phagi Tehsil in Jaipur district, Rajasthan.

Chauru has eight patwar circles - Ghatiyali, Chauru North, Chauru South, Dalniya, Nareda, Mandawara, Mandawari and Mendwas.

Based on 2011 census, Chauru has 734 households with total population of 5,078 (52.46% males, 47.54% females). Total area of village is 47.57 km^{2}. There are 3 primary schools, one commercial bank and one post office in the village.

== Villages in Chauru ==
Patwar circle	Village
Ghatiyali	Kudli
Ghatiyali	Gulabpura @ Gopalpura
Ghatiyali	Ghatiyali
Chauru North	Chauru North
Chauru South	Chauru South
Dalniya	Dalniya
Dalniya	Dhuwaliya
Dalniya	Nari Khera
Dalniya	Hachookara
Nareda	Nareda
Mandawara	Chhapri
Mandawara	Mandawara
Mandawari	Ganeshpura Faujiyan
Mandawari	Mandawari
Mendwas	Kansya
Mendwas	Mendwas
