= Chittora =

- village
- Location in Rajasthan, India Chittora (India)
- Coordinates: 26.63764°N 75.70421°E
- Country: India
- State: Rajasthan
- District: Jaipur
- Tehsils: Phagi

Area
  - Total: 23.69 km^{2} (9.15 sq mi)
- Elevation: 383 m (1,257 ft)

Population
  - Total: 3,170
  - Density: 134/km^{2} (350/sq mi)

Languages
  - Official: Hindi
- Time zone: UTC+5:30 (IST)
- PIN: 303904
- Telephone code: 911430
- ISO 3166 code: RJ-IN
- Lok Sabha constituency: Dausa
- Vidhan Sabha constituency: Chaksu
- Distance from Jaipur: 38 kilometres (24 mi) South (land)
- Distance from Phagi: 18 kilometres (11 mi) North (land)

Chittora is a village and revenue block (ILRC) in Phagi Tehsil in Jaipur district, Rajasthan.

Based on a 2011 census, Chittora has a total population of 3,170 (53.53% male, 46.47% female) distributed among 392 households. The total area of the village is 23.69 km^{2}.
