= Shivanand Goswami =

Indian poet

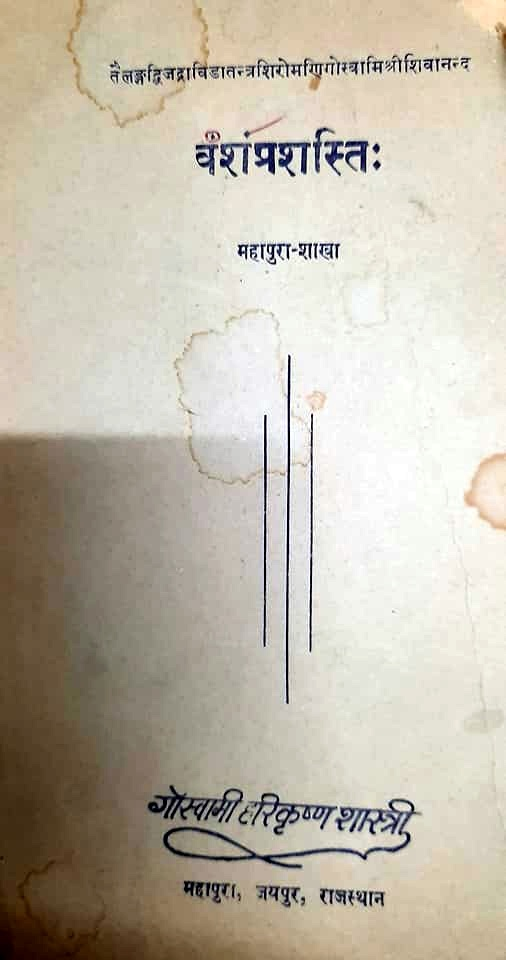

Shivanand Goswami, also known as Shiromani Bhatt, was a poet and a scholar of literature, poetics, Ayurveda, Oriental studies, the Vedas and Vedangas, ritualism, theology, astronomy, astrology (Hora Shastra), Sanskrit grammar, and a practitioner of Tantra–Mantra.

== Early life ==
Shivanand was born in Kanchipuram, Tamil Nadu. His ancestors were originally Tamil- and Telugu-speaking Panchadravida Vellanadu Brahmins, who later settled in Rajasthan, Madhya Pradesh, Uttar Pradesh and other regions of North India at the request and invitation of several North Indian kings. Goswami's grandfather, Shriwas Bhatt I, is believed to have migrated from Tamil Nadu to North India; he was bestowed the title of "Goswami" upon the completion of his training in tantra under his guru Satchidananda Sundaracharya in 1525, and was renamed Goswami Vidyanand Nath.

Shiromani Bhatt's father was Shri Jaganniwas Bhatt, who was invited by the Bundelkhand king Devi Singh to serve as his rajguru. Later, the Amber king Bishan Singh invited his son, Goswami, to his capital to perform a Vajapeya Yajna and subsequently accepted him as the rajguru of the Kachchawa clan.

== Simha-Siddhanta-Sindhu ==
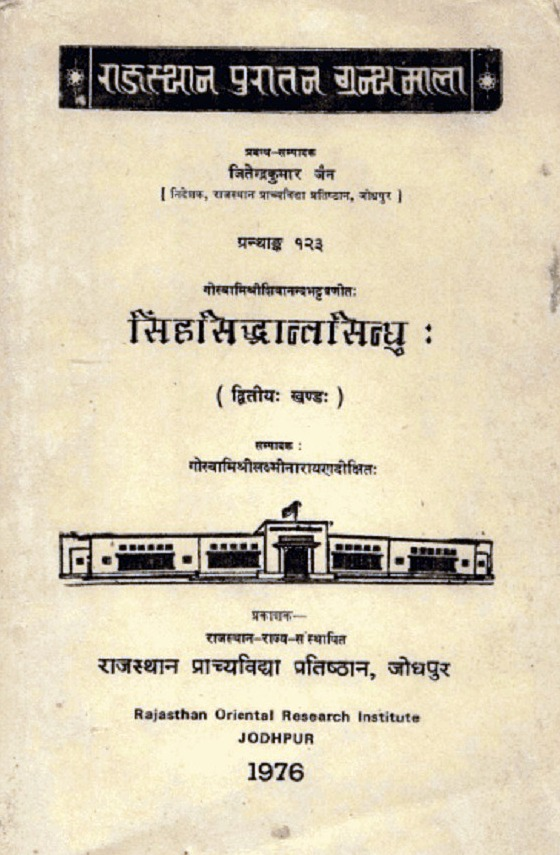
Singh Siddhant Sindhu by Shivananda Goswami

Shivananda Goswami was a devotee of the goddess Tripura Sundari. Traditional accounts describe him as a practitioner of Tantra and attribute to him knowledge of occult and tantric practices. After the Srimad Bhagavatam, the composition of the text Singh-Siddhant-Sindhu is attributed to Shivananda Goswami. Written in 1674, the work is said to comprise approximately 35,130 Sanskrit verses, exceeding the verse count of the Srimad Bhagavatam.

The handwritten manuscript of the work was preserved at the Anup Sanskrit Library in Bikaner. Nearly four centuries after its composition, it was published in printed form by the Rajasthan Oriental Research Institute of Jodhpur in three volumes, under the editorship of Pandit Laxminarayan Goswami. The third volume was also issued as an e-book by exoticindiaart.com. The text is encyclopaedic in scope and includes material drawn from a wide range of disciplines, including Sanskrit poetry, Tantra, Mantra Shastra, Nyaya, Agama–Nigama traditions, Dharmashastras, Mimamsa, sutra literature, ethics, astrology, the Vedas and Vedangas, grammar, medicine, Ayurveda, yajna procedures (Yagya-Vidhi), rituals, and Hora Shastra. According to the editor, two additional volumes were under publication by the Rajasthan Oriental Research Institute.

== Other works ==
Goswami is credited with authoring more than 35 Sanskrit works, although this figure requires further verification. Apart from champu kavya, most of his compositions are written in verse form. A list of citations from the first ten tarangas (waves) of Singh Siddhanta Sindhu was published in Chennai (formerly Madras). He is described in traditional accounts as a devotee of the goddess Tripura Sundari. Owing to his association with Srividya practice, he was conferred the title Sakshi-Natya-Shiromani by a community of scholars in Varanasi.

Approximately 30 of his works, mostly in the form of handwritten manuscripts, are preserved in institutions such as the Anup Sanskrit Library, Bikaner; the Pothikhana of the City Palace, Jaipur; the Bhandarkar Oriental Research Institute, Pune; and other repositories.

- Singh-Siddhant-Sindhu (1674) सिंहसिद्धान्तसिन्धु
- Singh-Siddhant-Pradeepak सिंह-सिद्धान्त-प्रदीपक
- Subodh Roopawali सुबोध रूपावली
- Srividyayasparyakram-Darpan श्रीविद्यास्यपर्याक्रम-दर्पण
- Vidyarchandipika विद्यार्चनदीपिका
- Lalitarchana-Kaumudi ललितार्चन-कौमुदी
- Laxminarayanarcha-Kaumudi लक्ष्मीनारायणार्चा-कौमुदी
- Laxminarayan-Stuti लक्ष्मीनारायण-स्तुति
- Subhgodaya-Darpana सुभगोदय-दर्पण
- Aacharsindhu आचारसिन्धु
- Prayashchittaranava-Sanket प्रायश्चित्तार्णव-संकेत
- Aanhikaratna आन्हिकरत्न
- Mahabharata-Subhashita-Shloka-Sangraha महाभारत-सुभाषित-श्लोक-संग्रह
- Vyavahara-Nirnaya व्यवहारनिर्णय
- Vaidyaratna वैद्यरत्न
- Muhurtaratna मुहूर्तरत्न
- Kala-Viveka काल-विवेक
- Tithi-Nirnaya तिथिनिर्णय
- Amarakoshasya Balabodhini Tika अमरकोशस्य बालबोधिनी टीका
- Stree-Pratyaya-Kosha स्त्री-प्रत्यय-कोश
- Karaka-Kosha कारक-कोश
- Samaasa-Kosha समास-कोश
- Shabda-Bheda-Prakash शब्द-भेद-प्रकाश
- Aakhyanavada आख्यानवाद
- Padartha-Tattva-Nirupana पदार्थतत्त्वनिरूपण
- Naya-Viveka नय-विवेक
- Ishwarastuti ईश्वरस्तुति
- Kulpradeep कुलप्रदीप
- Shri-Chandra-Pooja-Prayoga श्रीचन्द्रपूजा-प्रयोग
- Nityarchana-Kathana नित्यार्चन-कथन

== Honours, felicitations and jagirs ==
During the seventh generation of the Orchha rulers, Devi Singh (r. 1635–1641) is recorded to have bestowed a jagir comprising four villages in the Bundelkhand region of present-day Madhya Pradesh upon Goswami, following his receipt of Sri Vidya mantra diksha from him.

Between 1692 and 1694, the Amber ruler Bishan Singh granted him the jagirs of Ramjipura (the area on which present-day Malviya Nagar, Jaipur, is situated), along with Harivanshpura, Chimanpura and Mahapura. Documentary evidence of these grants is preserved in inscriptions held in the Pothikhana (royal library) of the City Palace, Jaipur. Mahapura has since been incorporated into the Jaipur metropolitan area. The descendants of Goswami and his brother, Janardan Goswami, are recorded as having resided in the Amber–Mahapura region.

After Shivanand Goswami decided to settle in Bikaner, relinquishing his property villages in Jaipur, the jagirs of two villages—Pulasar and Chilkoi—were granted to him by the Bikaner ruler Anup Singh (r. 1669–1698).

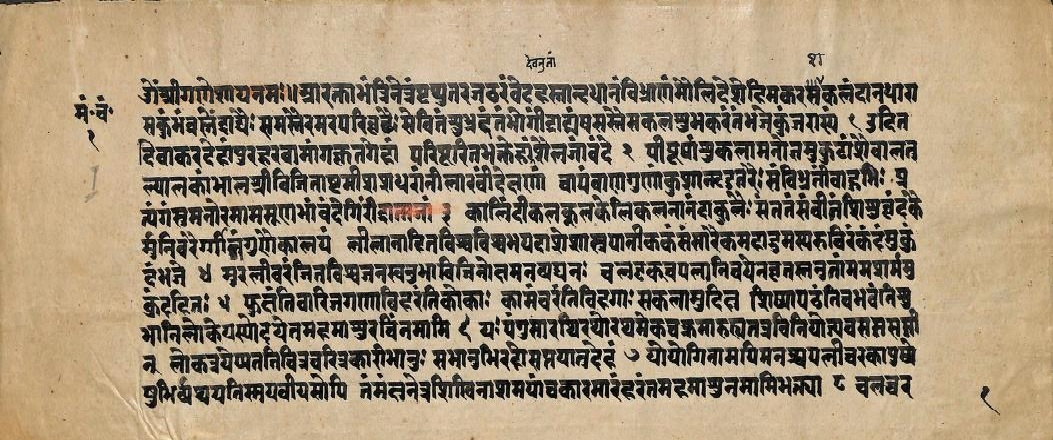
A page from a 17th-century manuscript by Janardan Goswami

== Death ==
Goswami is widely believed to have spent his final years in Bikaner in the company of Maharaja Anup Singh. The exact place of his death remains uncertain and continues to be a subject of research; various sources alternatively suggest Bikaner, Mahapura, or a location in South India.
