= Hasampura =

- village
- Location in Rajasthan, India Hasampura (India)
- Country: India
- State: Rajasthan
- District: Jaipur district
- Municipality: Sanganer

Hasampura is a village in Sanganer Sub District of Jaipur District in Rajasthan State of India. Sanganer in one of the 13 Sub divisions of Jaipur district. In Sanganer Tehsil there are 147 villages and Dahmi Kalan is one of them.
