= Dahmi Kalan =

- village
- Country: India
- State: Rajasthan
- District: Jaipur district
- Municipality: Sanganer

Dahmi Kalan is a village in Sanganer Sub District of Jaipur District in Rajasthan State of India. Sanganer in one of the 13 Sub divisions of Jaipur district. In Sanganer Tehsil there are 147 villages and Dahmi Kalan is one of them.

== Demography ==
Total population is 5850 and male are 2950 and female are 2900. There are 919 household in the village.

== Education ==
Two Universities are in Dahmi Kalan.

- Dr. Bhimrao Ambedkar Law University has proposed permanent campus since 2021 in this village.
- Manipal University Jaipur, Private University
