= Luniyawas =

Village in Jaipur district, Rajasthan, India

Luniyawas लुनियावास
- Village
- Location in Rajasthan, India
- Coordinates: 26.8833°N 75.9167°E
- Country: India
- State: Rajasthan
- District: Jaipur
- Tehsil: Sanganer

Languages
- Time zone: UTC+5:30 (IST)
- PIN: 303012
- Telephone code: +91-141

Luniyawas (also spelled Luniawas, Looniyawas, or Looniyabaas) is a village in the Sanganer tehsil of Jaipur district in the Indian state of Rajasthan. Luniyawas is on the outskirts of Jaipur, Rajasthan’s capital city.

Luniyawas hosts the annual Luniyawas Donkey Fair (Looniyabas Khachhar Mela), a well known melā in the region. The village is also known for its pottery and dupatta.

== Culture and festivals ==
Luniyawas is best known for its donkey fair. It attracts traders, breeders, and buyers from across the region. In addition to animal trading, the festival also features donkey racing, traditional dances, and live music.

== Geography ==
Luniyawas is located near the Jaipur-Agra National Highway. It shares borders with several suburban areas of eastern Jaipur and falls under the Jaipur Development Authority (JDA) region.
