= Dhuan Kalan =

- village
- Location in Rajasthan, India Dhuan Kalan (India)
- Coordinates: 25.944°N 75.696°E
- Country: India
- State: Rajasthan

Languages
  - Official: Hindi
- Time zone: UTC+5:30 (IST)
- ISO 3166 code: RJ-IN

Dhuan Kalan is a village near Deoli city, in the Tonk district of Rajasthan, India. Khurd and Kalan are Persian words which mean small and Big respectively. When two villages have the same name they are distinguished by adding Kalan (big) or Khurd (small) to the village name.

The famous saint and social reformer Dhanna Bhagat was born in village Chauru in Tonk district but his father moved to this village and settled here. This village was earlier known as Abhaynagar. There is a Gurudwara of Saint Dhanna Bhagat in village Duan Kala. There was a grand 'Gurumat chetna yatra' started from this Gurudwara in 2004 in memory of completion of 400 years of Gurugranth sahib.
