= Mandor =

- village
- Location in Rajasthan, India Mandor (India)
- Coordinates: 26.70379°N 75.53272°E
- Country: India
- State: Rajasthan
- District: Jaipur
- Talukas: Phagi

Area
  - Total: 11.55 km^{2} (4.46 sq mi)
- Elevation: 383 m (1,257 ft)

Population
  - Total: 1,191
  - Density: 103/km^{2} (270/sq mi)

Languages
  - Official: Hindi
- Time zone: UTC+5:30 (IST)
- PIN: 303005
- Telephone code: 911430
- ISO 3166 code: RJ-IN
- Vehicle registration: RJ-
- Lok Sabha constituency: Ajmer
- Vidhan Sabha constituency: Dudu
- Distance from Jaipur: 50 kilometres (31 mi) South (land)
- Distance from Phagi: 10 kilometres (6.2 mi) North (land)

Mandor is an ILRC and a village in Phagi Tehsil in the Jaipur district, Rajasthan.

Mandor has seven patwar circles: Kansel, Pachala, Mandor, Rotwara, Ladana, Sawai Jaisinghpura and Sultaniya.

Based on the 2011 census, Mandor has 158 households with total population of 1,191 (51.89% males, 48.11% females). The total area of the village is 11.55 km^{2}. There is one primary school in the village.

== Villages in Mandor ==
Patwar circle	Village
Kansel	Kansel
Kansel	Jagat Shiromanipura @ Manpura
Kansel	Teekel Narukan
Kansel	Rata Khera
Kansel	Salarsoo
Pachala	Jhodinda Bhojpura
Pachala	Pachala
Mandor	Teekel Purohitan
Mandor	Pinach
Mandor	Mandor
Mandor	Rewantpura
Rotwara	Koonchyawas
Rotwara	Kunj Biharipura
Rotwara	Keeratura
Rotwara	Bheempura
Rotwara	Rotwara
Rotwara	Sanwal
Rotwara	Harbanshpura
Ladana	Deonagar
Ladana	Ladana
Sawai Jaisinghpura	Govindpura @ Basra
Sawai Jaisinghpura	Chhardara
Sawai Jaisinghpura	Nandlalpura
Sawai Jaisinghpura	Bookni
Sawai Jaisinghpura	Sherpura
Sawai Jaisinghpura	Sawai Jaisinghpura
Sawai Jaisinghpura	Hingoniya
Sultaniya	Awandiya
Sultaniya	Rampura
Sultaniya	Sultaniya
Sultaniya	Sawa Ka Bas
