= Renwal railway station =

Railway station in Rajasthan, India

Renwal

General information
- Location: Renwal, Jaipur district, Rajasthan; India
- Coordinates: 27.150191°N 75.356441°E
- Elevation: 402 metres (1,319 ft)
- System: Indian Railways station
- Owner: Indian Railways
- Operator: North Western Railway
- Line: Phulera–Ringas line
- Platforms: 2
- Tracks: 2

Construction
- Structure type: Standard (on ground station)
- Parking: Yes

Other information
- Status: Functioning
- Station code: RNW
- Zone(s): North Western Railway
- Division(s): Jaipur
Location
- Location within India Location within Rajasthan

Renwal railway station is a railway station in Jaipur district, Rajasthan, India. Its code is RNW. It serves Renwal village. The station consists of 2 platforms. Passenger and express trains halt here.

== Trains ==
The following trains halt at Renwal railway station in both directions:

- Chetak Express
- Indore–Bikaner Mahamana Express
