= Ramavatar Bairwa =

Indian politician

Member of the Rajasthan Legislative Assembly
- Incumbent
- Assumed office 3 December 2023
- Preceded by: Ved Prakash Solanki
- Constituency: Chaksu

Personal details
- Born: 1 February 1981 (age 45) Chaksu, Jaipur, Rajasthan, India
- Party: Bharatiya Janata Party (India)
- Spouse: Sunita Devi Bairwa
- Children: 2
- Occupation: Politician
- Profession: Agriculture
- Website: Official website

Ramavatar Bairwa (born 1 February 1981) is an Indian politician currently serving as a member of the 16th Rajasthan Legislative Assembly from the Chaksu Assembly constituency. He is a member of the Bharatiya Janata Party (BJP).

Following the 2023 Rajasthan Legislative Assembly election, Bairwa was elected as an MLA from Chaksu. He defeated Indian National Congress candidate Ved Prakash Solanki, securing 104,064 votes.

== Early life and education ==
Bairwa was born into a middle-class farming family in Chaksu, Rajasthan. He previously served as a councillor in the Chaksu Municipality. He contested the 2018 Rajasthan Legislative Assembly election from Chaksu but was unsuccessful.

In 2017, Bairwa completed his secondary education (10th standard) through the Rajasthan State Open School in Jaipur.

== Political career ==
Ramavatar Bairwa began his political journey at the grassroots level as a councillor in the Chaksu Municipality. In 2018, he contested the Rajasthan Assembly elections as the BJP candidate from Chaksu but was narrowly defeated.

In 2023, Bairwa was once again nominated by the Bharatiya Janata Party to contest from Chaksu. This time, he secured a decisive victory against the incumbent Ved Prakash Solanki, receiving over 104,000 votes. He currently serves as a Member of the 16th Rajasthan Legislative Assembly. His political focus includes agricultural development, rural infrastructure, and local governance.

== Electoral record ==
Election results
Year	Office	Constituency	Party	Votes	%	Opponent	Opponent Party	Votes	%	Result	Ref
2018	MLA	Chaksu	Bharatiya Janata Party	66,576	41.90	Ved Prakash Solanki	Indian National Congress	70,007	44.06	Lost	
2023	MLA	Chaksu	Bharatiya Janata Party	104,064	58.94	Ved Prakash Solanki	Indian National Congress	54,684	30.97	Won	
