= Mahapura =

Mahapura Mahapoora
- Village
- Location within India Location within Rajasthan
- Coordinates: 26°50′51″N 75°40′13″E
- Country: India
- State: Rajasthan
- District: Jaipur
- Elevation: 305 m (1,001 ft)

Population (2022)
  - Total: 2,776

Languages
  - Official: Hindi
- Time zone: UTC+5:30 (IST)
- ISO 3166 code: RJ-IN
- Vehicle registration: RJ 14
- Website: http://www.Mahapura live

Mahapura, about 15 kilometers away from the capital town of Rajasthan (about one kilometer south-east of Jaipur-Ajmer road) is a historical village in Sanganer tehsil of Jaipur district, dedicated to the eminent scholar like Shivanand Goswami (the creator of Magnum Opus Simha sidhhanta Sindhu ) by Amer king Maharaja Bishan Singh. Maharaja had presented him this village as a jagir to mark his acceptance of his discipleship. Mahapura is one of the unique villages of India for many reasons, as many unknown aspects of history and culture are associated with this village.

King Bishan Singh of the erstwhile Amer kingdom had invited him to Amer for getting a Vajpeya Yagna conducted. He also gave the title of Guru to Shivanandji and presented five villages as Guru-Dakshina. Mahapura was also one of these villages- Chimanpura, Harivanshpura, Ramjipura, Ramchandrapura.

== Etymology of Mahapura ==
The derivation of the name of this village is mentioned in antique Sanskrit books Muhurta-ratna by Janardana Bhatt Goswami and Sabheda-Aarya-saptashati by Sriniketan Bhatt (II), which date back to the seventeenth and eighteenth centuries respectively. Some researchers are of the opinion that in the memory of Penna River, flowing in south India, from where the brahmin pundits migrated, the village was first named 'Mahapoora', which later came into use as ‘Mahapura’- a huge or a glorified village.

== A Land of Scholars ==
Mahapura located near National Highway No. 8, has been the workplace of many renowned Sanskrit scholars. More than four hundred years old tantric-deity of Laxminarayan, worshipped by Shivanand Goswami himself, is still in a Mahapura temple. This idol was brought here by Sivananda Goswami, whose ancestors came to North India all the way from Tamilnadu. This Deity was also later worshiped by Gopikrishna Goswami who was a known Pundit and erstwhile Jagirdar of this village.

Renowned poet-scholar and a celebrated Tantrik Shiromani Bhatt had lived here for some time. He got a pucca platform constructed here after performing the Vajpeya Yagya for Raja Bishan Singh in Amber in 1680 AD, which is still present in a relic form (it is called Hardaul's Chabutara) Legend has it that on the request of Amber Maharaja, Shivanand Goswami had left Orchha/ chanderi Madhya Pradesh in 1680 AD, on horse back and family in bullock carts to settle in Amber. Mughal robbers were a great terror at many places in central India then including Bundelkhand. Since Shivanand Goswami was the respected guru of king of Orchha, the King sent two courageous armoured chieftains of Hardaul-dynasty to lead his procession, but some bandits suddenly attacked Shivanand Ji's convoy when it was passing through a dense jungle. The Bundela heroes eliminated all those robbers in one to one ambush, but both the Hardaul-Sardars, who were escorting the procession, got killed in this violent-battle.

After reaching Amber safely, he went to Kashi for performing religious rituals for those departed heroes and duly completed Shrradh/Tarpan. After Mahapura was awarded to him Shivanand Goswami for making the Bundela escorts memory ever lasting, both in Mahapura and Bikaner, where he stayed, established these platforms. For four hundred years, the Goswami-family had been lighting a lamp of ghee on these platforms. Even today, the Goswamis, especially of the Aatreya clan, worship these platforms where there are idols of Hardaul warriors. Shivanand's two younger brothers were also celebrated pundits. V S Bhatnagar writes- "literary activity under Jai Singh’s patronage was another significant feature of his reign. Though Jai Singh’s chief interest was in astronomy, he invited a large number of scholars and poets from all parts of India, offering them full facilities to pursue their studies amidst peaceful conditions prevailing in his State. His father Raja Bishan Singh, had extended cordial welcome to Shivanand Goswami, a Telanga Brahman, who formerly resided at Chanderi. Sivanand was a voluminous writer. His creations discovered so far include works on Dharmasastra, Grammar, and Astronomy. After staying at Amber for some time, Sivanand went away to Bikaner, but his two younger brothers — Janardan Bhatt Goswami and Chakrapani bhatt— continued to stay at Amber. Janardan Bhatt, who too later on went away to Bikaner, composed Srangarasatak,^* Vairagyasatak,^^ Mantrachandrika,^^ and Lalitarchana Pradipika^’’ (a work on Tantra), and his brother, Chakrapani, who was a Tantrik scholar, composed Panchayatan Prakash. Niketan Goswami, the eldest son of Sivanand, composed सभेदा आर्या सप्तशती a work on erotics, in which he describes the amorous play of the naikas."

In This village Bhatt Mathuranath Shastri was married in 1922. His brother-in-law and a great Sanskrit poet Goswami Harikrishna Shastri wrote his Sanskrit magnum opus 'Divyalok' while staying here.

Late Ghanshyam Goswami, a descendant of Shivananda Goswami, had founded a 'Sivananda-Library' here for Sanskrit studies and research and on whose invitation the Speaker of Lok Sabha M A Ayyangar (tenure 8 March 1956 - 16 April 1962)many governors and chief ministers, some foreign dignitaries, scholars, saints, researchers, and religious leaders have visited mahapura for some reason or the other.

== Census Portfolio of Mahapura ==
As per Census statistics the village-profile of Mahapura is something like this:

The total revenue area is 778 hectares - Number of families residing in is 384. The total population of these families is 2,776 in which males are 1,467 and females are 1,309. Scheduled Caste The population is 238, of which 120 are males and 118 are females. Scheduled Tribe There are only 4 people of the population in which 2 are female and 2 are male No. of Primary Schools 2, No. of Secondary Schools 3, No. of Senior Secondary Schools 1, No. of Colleges 1, No. of Training Schools 1 and the number of other private educational schools is 1. The number of Ayurvedic dispensary is 1 and that of Primary Health Sub Center is 1. Fortunately potable water facilities are available where tap water, tube well and hand pump water are available. Post, telegraph and facilities phone are available since inception- Post Office No. 1 and telephone connections The number is 120. Bus services are available, rail services are not; Banking facilities are also available The number of commercial bank is 2. Number of Agricultural Credit Societies 1 is the number of non-agricultural credit societies. Pucca roads are available to various places, the nearest cities are: Jaipur and Bagru with distances of 12 and 16 kms respectively. electricity supply facilities are available for domestic use, agricultural use and other purposes. newspaper /magazine/ internet facilities are also available. The total unirrigated area here is 290.02 hectares - the remaining cultivable land (including grazing land and trees) is 153.91 hectares.
