= Babulal Nagar =

Indian politician

MLA, Government of Rajasthan, 12 December 2023
- In office Cabinet minister 2008 - 2013
- Constituency: Dudu

MLA
- In office 1998 - 2013

Personal details
- Born: 10 October 1960 (age 65) Tevadi, Viratnagar, Jaipur
- Party: INC
- Spouse: Sunita Nagar
- Education: Rajasthan University PhD

Babulal Nagar (बाबूलाल नागर) is an Indian politician, MLA of Rajasthan formerly with the Indian National Congress party. He was a former minister in the Government of Rajasthan. Nagar was elected to Rajasthan Legislative Assembly in 2008 from Dudu in Jaipur district on the Congress ticket. Under chief minister Ashok Gehlot, Nagar was appointed the Dairy, Khadi and Rural Industries Minister. He resigned in September 2013 under pressure from the chief minister and women's groups, and he was expelled from the Congress Party a few days later.

== Criminal allegations ==
Babulal Nagar was cleared of rape charges brought in 2013 by a 35-year-old woman who had alleged that Nagar called her to his official residence on the pretext of giving her a government job and then raped her. Nagar had indicated at the time charges were brought that they were politically motivated; after his acquittal, he reiterated that it was all a political conspiracy, and demanded a CBI investigation.
