= Mandi, Phagi =

Mandi
- village
- Location in Rajasthan, India Mandi (India)
- Coordinates: 26.54496°N 75.58396°E
- Country: India
- State: Rajasthan
- District: Jaipur
- Talukas: Phagi

Area
  - Total: 9.19 km^{2} (3.55 sq mi)
- Elevation: 383 m (1,257 ft)

Population
  - Total: 999
  - Density: 109/km^{2} (280/sq mi)

Languages
  - Official: Hindi
- Time zone: UTC+5:30 (IST)
- PIN: 303005
- Telephone code: 911430
- ISO 3166 code: RJ-IN
- Lok Sabha constituency: Ajmer
- Vidhan Sabha constituency: Dudu
- Distance from Phagi: 5 kilometres (3.1 mi) East (land)
- Distance from Gokulpura: 5 kilometres (3.1 mi) North (land)

Mandi is a patwar circle and village in Phagi Tehsil in Jaipur district, Rajasthan. Mandi is also a patwari circle for nearby villages, Mohanpura Ranwa and Rampura Railway.

In Mandi, there are 138 households with a total population of 999 (with 53.05% males and 46.95% females), based on 2011 census. Total area of the village is 9.19 km^{2}. There is one primary school in Mandi village.
