= Nimera, Phagi =

Nimera
- village
- Location in Rajasthan, India Nimera (India)
- Coordinates: 26.50576°N 75.51504°E
- Country: India
- State: Rajasthan
- District: Jaipur
- Talukas: Phagi

Area
  - Total: 21.04 km^{2} (8.12 sq mi)
- Elevation: 383 m (1,257 ft)

Population
  - Total: 4,227
  - Density: 201/km^{2} (520/sq mi)

Languages
  - Official: Hindi
- Time zone: UTC+5:30 (IST)
- PIN: 303005
- Telephone code: 911430
- ISO 3166 code: RJ-IN
- Lok Sabha constituency: Ajmer
- Vidhan Sabha constituency: Dudu
- Distance from Phagi: 10 kilometres (6.2 mi) South (land)
- Distance from Malpura: 31 kilometres (19 mi) North (land)

Nimera is an ILRC and village in Phagi Tehsil in Jaipur district, Rajasthan.

Nimera has eight patwar circles - Keriya, Kishorpura, Nainasya, Nimera, Parwan, Lasariya, Sameliya and Hatheli. Nimera is also a revenue circle for nearby villages, Jagannathpura and Shri Ramganj.

Based on 2011 census, Nimera has 663 households with total population of 4,227 (52.24% males, 47.76% females). Total area of village is 21.04 km^{2}. There are 4 primary schools and one commercial bank in the village.

== Villages in Nimera ==
Patwar circle	Village
Keriya	Dwarkanathpura @ Keriya
Keriya	Kanwarpura
Keriya	Gokulpura
Keriya	Madanpura
Kishorpura	Kishorpura
Kishorpura	Beer Ramchandrapura
Kishorpura	Bimalpura
Kishorpura	Mohanpura Rajawatan
Kishorpura	Ramchandrapura
Kishorpura	Lakhawas
Nainasya	Gadooda
Nainasya	Maharajpura @ Nainasya
Nainasya	Sirsya
Nimera	Jagannathpura
Nimera	Nimera
Nimera	Shri Ramganj
Parwan	Khandooj
Parwan	Dhunwaliya
Parwan	Parwan
Parwan	Panwasoo Khera
Parwan	Barh Mordi
Parwan	Mordi
Lasariya	Palri
Lasariya	Lasariya
Sameliya	Chandama Khurd
Sameliya	Mandap
Sameliya	Sameliya
Hatheli	Nathmalpura
Hatheli	Ratanpura
Hatheli	Harsundarpura @ Hatheli
