= Chaksu Assembly constituency =

Legislative Assembly constituency in Rajasthan State, India

Coordinates: 26.61°N 75.94°E

Chaksu
- Constituency No. 58 for the Rajasthan Legislative Assembly

Constituency details
- Country: India
- Region: North India
- State: Rajasthan
- District: Jaipur
- Lok Sabha constituency: Dausa
- Established: 2008
- Total electors: 231,087
- Reservation: SC

Member of Legislative Assembly
- 16th Rajasthan Legislative Assembly
- Incumbent Ramavatar Bairwa
- Party: Bhartiya Janta Party
- Elected year: 2023

Chaksu Assembly constituency is one of the 200 Legislative Assembly constituencies of Rajasthan state in India. It is in Jaipur district and is reserved for candidates belonging to the Scheduled Castes. It is in the Dausa Lok Sabha constituency and was created by Delimitation Commission in 2008.

Chaksu Constituency covers all voters from Chaksu Tehsil (excluding 4 Patwar circles of ILRC Kotkhawada - Mahadeopura, Rupaheri Kalan, Narpatpura and Rupaheri Khurd) and part of Phagi Tehsil (3 ILRCs - Chittora, Madhorajpura and Renwal).

== Member of the Legislative Assembly ==
| Election | Name | Party |
|---|---|---|
| 2008 | Promila Kundara | Bharatiya Janata Party |
| 2013 | Laxminarain | Bharatiya Janata Party |
| 2018 | Ved Prakash Solanki | Indian National Congress |
| 2023 | Ramavatar Bairwa | Bharatiya Janata Party |

== Election results ==
=== 2023 ===
2023 Rajasthan Legislative Assembly election: Chaksu
| Party | Candidate | Votes | % | ±% |
|---|---|---|---|---|
| BJP | Ramavtar Bairwa | 104,064 | 58.94 | +17.04 |
| INC | Ved Prakash Solanki | 54,684 | 30.97 | −13.09 |
| RLP | Vikesh Kholia | 14,068 | 7.97 | −2.55 |
| NOTA | None of the above | 1,147 | 0.65 | −0.54 |
| Majority | | 49,380 | 27.97 | +25.81 |
| Turnout | | 176,557 | 76.4 | −1.02 |
| BJP gain from INC | | Swing | | |

=== 2018 ===
Rajasthan Legislative Assembly Election, 2018: Chaksu
| Party | Candidate | Votes | % | ±% |
|---|---|---|---|---|
| INC | Ved Prakash Solanki | 70,007 | 44.06 | |
| BJP | Ramavatar Bairwa | 66,576 | 41.9 | |
| RLP | Hemant Vijay | 16,706 | 10.52 | |
| API | Jeetram Bairwa | 1,695 | 1.07 | |
| NOTA | None of the above | 1,893 | 1.19 | |
| Majority | | 3,431 | 2.16 | |
| Turnout | | 158,877 | 77.42 | |

== See also ==
- List of constituencies of the Rajasthan Legislative Assembly
- Jaipur district
