= Dudu, Rajasthan =

Dudu
- Town
- Country: India
- State: Rajasthan
- District: Jaipur district
- Established: 07/08/2023
- Division: Jaipur
- Elevation: 377 m (1,237 ft)

Population (2011)
  - Total: 14,961

Languages
  - Official: Hindi; Marwadi [in majority], Hindi, English
- Time zone: UTC+5:30 (IST)
- PIN: 303008
- Telephone code: 911428
- Vehicle registration: RJ 47
- Lok Sabha constituency: Ajmer
- Vidhan Sabha constituency: Dudu
- Distance from Jaipur: 74 kilometres (46 mi) South-West (NH11C&NH48)
- Distance from Sambhar: 30 kilometres (19 mi) South (RJ SH 2)
- Distance from Phagi: 40 kilometres (25 mi) North-West (RJ SH 2)
- Distance from Kishangarh: 41 kilometres (25 mi) East (NH8)
- Website: Dudu District

Dudu is a town in Jaipur district in the state of Rajasthan, India. It has an average elevation of 377 m (1,237 ft).

According to the 2011 census Dudu has a population of 14,961. Its population growth rate over the decade 2001-2011 was 26.91%. Dudu has a sex ratio of 943 females for every 1000 males, and a literacy rate of 61.98%.

Dr Artika Shukla was the first district collector of Dudu & Dudu's first SP was Pooja Awana. Dudu district had three sub-divisions and only three tehsils. There were in total 246 villages in Dudu.

Dudu became a district in 2023, after Rajasthan government created 17 new district. Dudu is not connected to any railway station & Major station near dudu is Phulera & Kishangarh.

In December 2024 Rajasthan government has abolished Dudu district, Dudu will now again come under Jaipur district

== Recent Updates ==
On 28 December 2024, the Cabinet of Rajasthan decided not to retain 9 new districts- Anupgarh, Dudu, Gangapur City, Jaipur Rural, Jodhpur Rural, Kekri, Neem Ka Thana and Sanchore, and Shahpura along with the 3 newly created divisions—Banswara, Pali, and Sikar.
