= Sanganer =

- Town
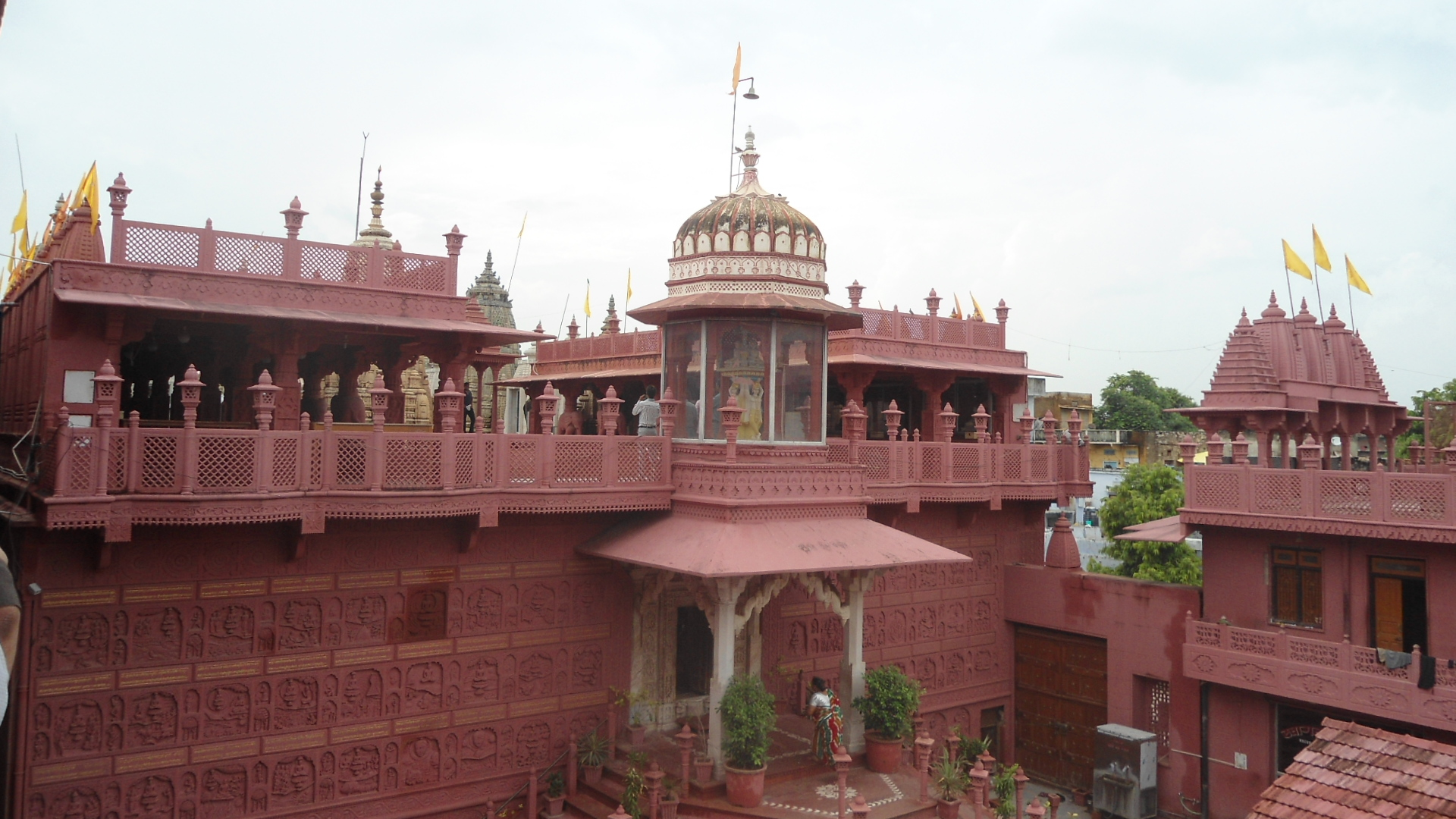
- Jain temple, Sanghiji

- Location in Jaipur, Rajasthan, India Sanganer (Rajasthan) Sanganer (India)
- Coordinates: 26.8221137°N 75.7418554°E
- Country: India
- State: Rajasthan
- District: Jaipur

Languages
  - Official: Hindi
- Time zone: UTC+5:30 (IST)
- PIN: 302029
- Vehicle registration: RJ-14
- Nearest city: Jaipur
- Climate: Hot and dry (Köppen)

Sanganer is a town, or tehsil, situated in Jaipur district, Rajasthan, 16 km south of state capital Jaipur. Jaipur is divided into 13 subdivisions, of which Sanganer is one. The town is famous for its textile printing, handmade paper industry, and Jain temples. Sanganer prints, for example, often have distinctive bright-coloured patterns printed on white backgrounds.

The handmade paper industry found its roots in the work of Maharaja Sawai Jai Singh II in 1728. Around ten handmade paper industries are present in Sanganer. Krishan Lal Balmiki the member of Rajya Sabha, was also from Sanganer. The town takes part in the legislative assembly of Rajasthan, and the current MLA of Sanganer is Bhajan Lal Sharma, who is the serving Chief Minister of Rajasthan.

Near to the town is Pratap Nagar, one of the largest Rajasthani housing board colonies, as well as EPIP (Export Promotion Industrial Park) Sitapura. Muhana and Muhana Mandi is 6 km from town.

== Infrastructure ==
Jaipur Airport is located in Sanganer. Ch Charan Singh National Institute of Agricultural Marketing (NIAM) and Indian Institute of Health Management Research (IIHMR) are two institutes located in Sanganer.

== Textiles of Sanganer ==
The history of the Sanganeri prints is around 500 years old. These prints originated between the 16th and 17th centuries, and by 1800, Sanganer was home to a well-established production house of block printing textiles.

Sanganeri prints are known for their delicate and fine designs. Originally, prints were created on white or off-white fabrics; however, in recent times, colorful fabrics have also been used experimentally as bases.

Prints often feature delicate floral patterns or motifs, generally known as 'Buttas'. The elaborate detailing of the flowers and petals is exclusive to Sanganer.

Today, the town's textile market is famous for its unique blend of traditional and modern styles of printing. To this end, Sanganer received a geographical indication (GI) tag in 2010.

== Places of historical importance ==
Sanganer is a famous pilgrimage town for the Jain community because of a very ancient Jain temple made of red stone. The ancient Shri Digamber Jain temple of Sanganer is 16 km from Jaipur. In this temple the principal deity is the Lord Adinath (Rishabh Dev). The ancient Shri Digambara Jain temple of Sanganer has fine carvings that are comparable to the Dilwara Temples of Mount Abu that are built in many phases. The last phase of this temple was completed in the 10th century A.D., according to an inscription of V.S. 1011 in one of the Toranas. It has sky-high shikharas and the inner sanctum is a stone shrine with sky-high eight shikharas (pinnacles).

In the midst of underground portion, there is located an ancient small temple guarded by the Yaksha. The sacred temple has seven underground floors which are kept closed due to old religious beliefs and visitors are not allowed to see them. It is said that only a Balyati ascetic Digambara saint can enter it and able to bring out the idols of this underground temple for a limited period, which is declared and decided previously. The idols thus brought out for viewing (Darshan) of devotees, must be placed back within auspicious signs. The temple came to light when Muni Sudhasagar Ji, a disciple of Acharya Vidyasagar Ji visited the underground floors. He brought valuable, never seen before, Jain Murti made of precious stones from the underground floors in the presence of more than five lac Jain disciples.

He claimed that he encountered many Yaksha in the form of snakes who were there to protect the treasure and ordinary people cannot enter into the underground floors without seeking permission from the protector gods. The process of bringing Murti and keeping back was telecast live on various TV channels and widely covered by the media.

== Villages ==
- Abhaipura
- Acharawala
- Ajairajpura
- Ajairajpura
- Anoppura
- Asawala
- Awaniya
- Badanpura
- Bagru Khurd
- Bagru Rawan
- Baksawala
- Balawala
- Balmukundpura @ Nada
- Barh Ajairajpura
- Barh Awaniya
- Barh Hariharpura
- Barh Shyopur
- Barhmohanpura
- Bari Ka Bas
- Beelwa Kalan
- Bhambhoriya
- Bhankrota Khurd
- Bhaosinghpura
- Bhapura
- Bhater
- Chak Amjhar
- Chak Basri
- Chak Harbanspura
- Chak No 6 (Chak Kitavti)
- Chak No.12
- Chak No.7
- Chak Saligrampura
- Chak Sherwali
- Chakwatika
- Chatarpura
- Chatarpura@ Lalya Ka Bas
- Chhitroli
- Chimanpura
- Chirota
- Dahmi Kalan
- Dahmi Khurd
- Dantli
- Daulatpura
- Dayalpura
- Devisinghpura
- Ganwar Brahmanan
- Ganwar Jatan
- Ghegha
- Girdharipura
- Goner
- Harbanshpura
- Harchandpura @ Deoliya
- Hardhyanpura
- Hargun Ki Nangal@Charanwala
- Hariharpura
- Hasampura
- Hasampura Bas Neota
- Jagannathpura
- Jagat Sharvanpura
- Jaichandpura
- Jaijaspura
- Jaisinghpura
- Jaisinghpura @ Bas Beelwa
- Jaisinghpura @ Buhariya
- Jaisinghpura @ Roopwas
- Jaisinghpura @ Tejawala
- Jaisinghpura Bas Jeerota
- Jaisinghpura Bas Neota
- Jatawala
- Jeerota
- Jhanyee
- Jhund
- Kalwara
- Kapoorawala
- Khatwara
- Kheri Gokulpura
- Khetapura
- Khoosar
- Kishanpura @ Khatipura
- Kishorpura
- Kodar
- Lakhana
- Lakhawas
- Lakshminarayanpura
- Laxmipura
- Laxmipura @ Nataniwala
- Luniyawas
- Mahapura
- Mahasinghpura @ Keshyawala
- Mandau
- Manohariya Wala
- Manpur Nagalya
- Manpura @ Bhatawala
- Manpura Teelawala
- Mathurawala
- Mohanpura
- Muhana
- Murlipura @ Mishra Ka Barh
- Nanakpura @ Hema Ki Nangal
- Nangal Bar Goojran@Phagodiyawala
- Narottampura
- Narsinghpura
- Narsinghpura @ Dadiya
- Narwariya
- Neota
- Palri Parsa
- Pawaliya
- Peepla Bharatsingh
- Prahladpura
- Prempura
- Prithvisinghpura @ Naiwala
- Purshottampura @ Dadiya
- Ramchandpura
- Ramdattpura
- Ramjipura Bas Neota
- Rampura @ Kanwarpura
- Rampura Unti
- Rampurawas Deoliya
- Ramsinghpura
- Ratalya
- Saligrampura
- Sanjariya
- Sanwant Ka Bas
- Sarangpura
- Seesyawas
- Shri Kishanpura
- Shri Ram Ki Nangal
- Shri Rampura
- Shyampura Buhariya
- Shyosinghpura
- Shyosinghpura @ Kallawala
- Sirani
- Siroli
- Sitapura Bas Sanjhariya
- Sitarampura
- Sukhdeopura @ Nataniwala
- Sukhdeopura @ Nohara
- Surajpura
- Teelawas
- Thikariya
- Vidhani
- Vimalpura
- Watika
