= State Highway 2 (Rajasthan) =

Road in Rajasthan, India

State Highway 2
- State Highway 2 in red

Route information
- Length: 210 km (130 mi)

Major junctions
- From: Dausa, Rajasthan
- To: Kuchaman, Rajasthan

Location
- Country: India
- State: Rajasthan
- Districts: Rajasthan: Dausa district, Jaipur district and Nagaur district
- Primary destinations: Lawan, Tunga, Phagi, Dudu, Sambhar, Nawan, Palari,

Highway system
- Roads in India; Expressways; National; State; Asian; State Highways in Rajasthan

State Highway 2 (RJ SH 2) is a State Highway in Rajasthan state of India that connects Dausa district of Rajasthan with Kuchaman in Nagaur district of Rajasthan. The total length of RJ SH 2 is 210 km.
