= State Highway 12 (Rajasthan) =

Road in Rajasthan, India

State Highway 12

Route information
- Length: 324.20 km (201.45 mi)

Major junctions
- From: Sanganer, Rajasthan
- To: Kankroli, Rajasthan

Location
- Country: India
- State: Rajasthan
- Districts: Rajasthan: Ajmer, Bhilwara, Jaipur, Rajsamand and Tonk
- Primary destinations: Phagi, Diggi, Malpura, Sawariya, Kekri, kadera, Shahpura, Mandal, Bhilwara

Highway system
- Roads in India; Expressways; National; State; Asian; State Highways in Rajasthan

State Highway 12 ( RJ SH 12) is a State Highway in Rajasthan state of India that connects Sanganer in Jaipur district with Kankroli in Rajsamand district of Rajasthan. The total length of RJ SH 12 is 324.20 km. It serves as a link from Kankroli, Rajasthan to Sanganer, Jaipur. The main city on this route is Shahpura, Kekri. It is an industrial road from Shahpura to Sanganer, Rajasthan. There is only three toll station on this road out of Shahpura, Kekri and malpura.
