= Phagi =

- Tehsil
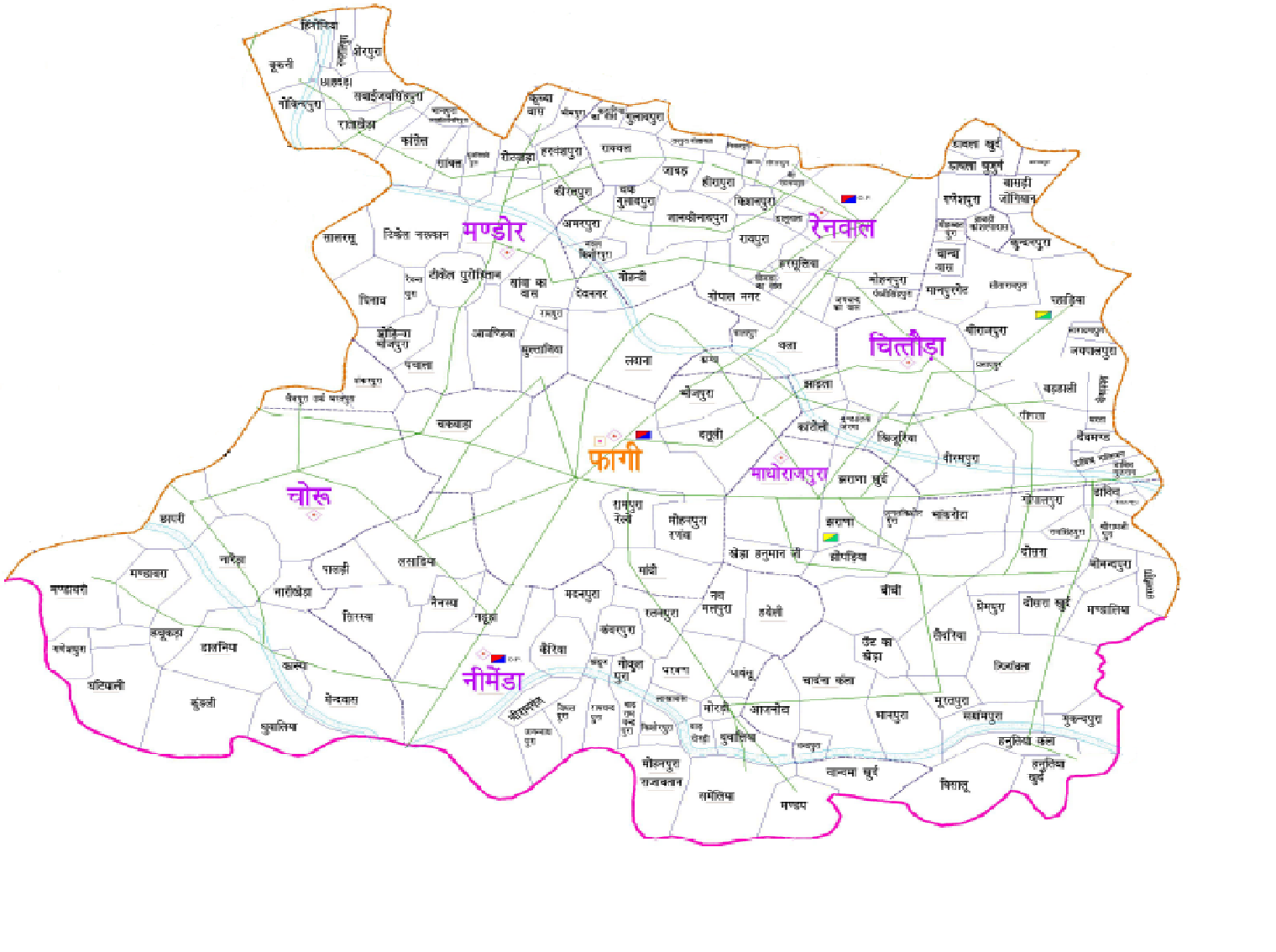
- Political map of Phagi Tehsil in Dudu district, Rajasthan, India

- Location in Rajasthan, India Phagi (India)
- Coordinates: 26.6°N 75.95°E
- Country: India
- State: Rajasthan
- District: Dudu
- Tehsil: Phagi

Government
  - Additional District Magistrate-II: Tikam Chand Bohra
  - Tehsildar: Ravi vijay
  - Sub Divisional Officer: Baldev Chaudhary

Area
  - Total: 1,114.308 km^{2} (430.237 sq mi)
- Elevation: 383 m (1,257 ft)

Population
  - Total: 161,610
  - Density: 145/km^{2} (380/sq mi)

Languages
  - Official: Hindi, Rajasthani
- Time zone: UTC+5:30 (IST)
- PIN: 303005
- Telephone code: 911430
- ISO 3166 code: RJ-IN
- Lok Sabha constituency: Ajmer & Dausa
- Vidhan Sabha constituency: Dudu & Chaksu
- Distance from Jaipur City: 51 kilometres (32 mi) South (land)
- Distance from Malpura: 41 kilometres (25 mi) North (land)
- Distance from Dudu: 40 kilometres (25 mi) East (land)
- Distance from Chaksu: 43 kilometres (27 mi) West (land)

Phagi is a tehsil and a panchayat samiti, near city of Jaipur in Jaipur district in the state of Rajasthan, India. It has an average elevation of 383 m (1,257 ft). Phagi is also one of the Town in Phagi Tehsil in Jaipur District. Phagi is located on the intersection of SH2 and SH12 of Rajasthan.

Phagi tehsil is divided into five Inspector Land Revenue Circles (or ILRCs) - Chittora, Chauru, Nimera, Phagi, Mandor.

ILRCs Phagi, Chauru, Mandor and Nimera are parts of Dudu assembly constituency and Ajmer (Lok Sabha constituency).

ILRC Phagi is subdivided into seven patwar circles - Chakwara, Phagi North, Phagi South, Phagi West, Bhojpura, Mandi and Shankarpura.

Phagi is 51 km far from its District Main City Jaipur . It is 36.0 km far from Sanganer near Jaipur .

== Demographic of Phagi tehsil ==
According to 2011 Census, there are 169 villages with 22,713 households having total population of 161,610 (with 52.12% males and 47.88% females) in Phagi Tehsil. Literacy rate in the tehsil is 63.2% (with 77.62% among males and 47.49% among females). There are 185 primary schools, 6 primary health centres, 25 post offices in the tehsil. There are 7 commercial banks and 2 Co-operative banks in Tehsil.

== Demographic of Phagi village ==
In Phagi village, there are 1,717 households with total population of 11,299 (with 52.33% males and 47.67% females), based on 2011 census. Total area of village is 62.7 km^{2}. There are 5 primary schools and one post office in the village. It has 2 commercial banks and 1 Co-operative bank. There is one cinema hall in Phagi village.

== Places of Interest ==
Ranchordass ji ka Mandir at Sameliya, Kalyan ji ka Mandir at Diggi in Tonk district and Dadabari at Malpura, Auliya Baba Dargah at Rampura near small lake.

== Villages in Phagi ==
Patwar circle	Village
Chakwara	Chakwara
Phagi North	Phagi North
Phagi South	Phagi South
Phagi West	Phagi West
Bhojpura	Datooli
Bhojpura	Bhojpura
didawata	didawata
didawata	Ramdev gi ki dhani
didawata	Bhanpura
Mukandpura nohar
hanutiya
Mandi	Mandi
Mandi	Mohanpura Ranwa
Mandi	Rampura Railway
Shankarpura	Chainpura, Bharatpura
Shankarpura	Shankarpura
