= Dudu Assembly constituency =

Lok Sabha constituency in Rajasthan

Coordinates: 26.68°N 75.23°E

Dudu
- Constituency No. 45 for the Rajasthan Legislative Assembly

Constituency details
- Country: India
- Region: North India
- State: Rajasthan
- District: Dudu
- Lok Sabha constituency: Ajmer
- Established: 1957
- Reservation: SC

Member of Legislative Assembly
- 16th Rajasthan Legislative Assembly
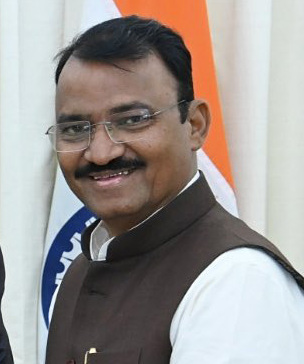
- Incumbent Prem Chand Bairwa; Deputy Chief Minister of Rajasthan
- Party: Bharatiya Janata Party
- Elected year: 2023

Dudu Assembly constituency is one of the constituencies of Rajasthan Legislative Assembly in the Ajmer Lok Sabha constituency.

As on 30 August 2018, there are 229,085 voters (52.55% males and 47.45% females) in the constituency.

Dudu Constituency covers all voters from Dudu Tehsil and part of Phagi Tehsil (4 ILRCs - Phagi, Chauru, Mandor and Nimera).

== Members of the Legislative Assembly ==
Year	Name	Party
1957	Laduram Sulaniya and Ajeet Singh Bajya	Akhil Bharatiya Ram Rajya Parishad
1962	Amar Singh	Swatantra Party
1967	Suwa Lal choudhary	Swatantra Party
1972	Kamla Beniwal	Indian National Congress
1977	Sohan Lal	Janata Party
1980	C L Kanwaria	Indian National Congress (I)
1985	Jai Kishan	Indian National Congress
1990	Ganpatrai Gade Ganwalia	Janata Dal
1993	Babu Lal Bachher	Bharatiya Janata Party
1998	Babulal Nagar	Indian National Congress
2003	Babulal Nagar	Indian National Congress
2008	Babulal Nagar	Indian National Congress
2013	Prem Chand Bairwa	Bharatiya Janata Party
2018	Babulal Nagar	Independent politician
2023	Prem Chand Bairwa	Bharatiya Janata Party

== Election results ==
=== 2023 ===
2023 Rajasthan Legislative Assembly election: Dudu
Party	Candidate	Votes	%	±%
BJP	Dr. Prem Chand Bairwa	116,561	57.73	▲27.31
INC	Babulal Nagar	80,818	40.02	▲23.79
NOTA	None of the above	1,232	0.61	▼0.23
Majority		35,743	17.71	▲9.38
Turnout		201,924	79.42	▲2.34
BJP gain from Independent		Swing		

=== 2018 ===
2018 Rajasthan Legislative Assembly election: Dudu
Party	Candidate	Votes	%	±%
Independent	Babulal Nagar	68,769	38.75	
BJP	Dr. Prem Chand Bairwa	53,990	30.42	
INC	Ritesh Bairwa	28,798	16.23	
RLP	Shankar Lal Narolia	18,948	10.68	
NOTA	None of the above	1,496	0.84	
Majority		14,779	8.33	
Turnout		177,453	77.08	
Independent gain from BJP		Swing		

== See also ==
- Member of the Legislative Assembly (India)
