= Shakti Singh Kaliyas =

Indian politician from the Bharatiya Janata Party

Shakti Singh Chundawat

Member of the Rajasthan Legislative Assembly
- Incumbent
- Assumed office 2013
- Preceded by: Ram Lal Gurjar
- Constituency: Asind

State Secretary of the Bharatiya Janata Yuva Morcha, Rajasthan

Personal details
- Born: 7 February 1974 (age 52)
- Party: Bharatiya Janata Party
- Spouse: Tara Kanwar
- Occupation: Politician
- Website: www.shaktikaliyas.in

Shakti Singh Kaliyas alias Shakti Singh Chundawat is an Indian politician from the Bharatiya Janata Party and representing the Asind Vidhan Sabha constituency of Rajasthan. and He is State Secretary at Bharatiya Janata Yuva Morcha, Rajasthan.

== Positions ==
- State Secretary at Bharatiya Janata Yuva Morcha, Rajasthan – present
