= Asind Assembly constituency =

Legislative Assembly constituency in Rajasthan State, India

Coordinates: 25.74°N 74.33°E

Asind
- Constituency No. 177 for the Rajasthan Legislative Assembly

Constituency details
- Country: India
- Region: North India
- State: Rajasthan
- District: Bhilwara
- Lok Sabha constituency: Bhilwara
- Established: 2008
- Total electors: 296,914
- Reservation: None

Member of Legislative Assembly
- 16th Rajasthan Legislative Assembly
- Incumbent Jabbar Singh Sankhala
- Party: Bharatiya Janata Party

Asind Assembly constituency is one of the 200 Legislative Assembly constituencies of Rajasthan state in India. asind assembly constituency is considered as gurjar dominant. And the number of gurjar voters in this seat is around 65 thousand.

It is part of Bhilwara district. As of 2023, its representative is Jabbar Singh Sankhala of the Bharatiya Janata Party.

== Members of the Legislative Assembly ==
Election	Name	Party
2008	Ramlal Gurjar	Bharatiya Janata Party
2013	Ramlal Gurjar	Bharatiya Janata Party
2018	Jabbar Singh Sankhala	Bharatiya Janata Party
2023	Jabbar Singh Sankhala	Bharatiya Janata Party

== Election results ==
=== 2023 ===
2023 Rajasthan Legislative Assembly election: Asind
Party	Candidate	Votes	%	±%
BJP	Jabbar Singh Sankhala	74,586	33.6	−1.66
INC	Hagamilal Mewara	73,060	32.91	−2.27
RLP	Dhanraj Gurjar	56,904	25.63	+4.51
Independent	Naru Lal Bhil	7,676	3.46	
NOTA	None of the above	2,029	0.91	−0.57
Majority		1,526	0.69	+0.61
Turnout		222,014	74.77	+1.98
BJP hold		Swing		

=== 2018 ===
2018 Rajasthan Legislative Assembly election: Asind
Party	Candidate	Votes	%	±%
BJP	Jabbar Singh Sankhala	70,249	35.26	
INC	Manish Mewara	70,095	35.18	
RLP	Mansukh Singh	42,070	21.12	
BSP	Dhanna Lal Salvi	6,092	3.06	
Bharatiya Yuva Shakti	Ram Kumar Mali	2,597	1.3	
AAP	Jagdish	2,001	1.0	
NOTA	None of the above	2,943	1.48	
Majority		154	0.08	
Turnout		199,236	72.79	
BJP hold		Swing		

== See also ==
- List of constituencies of the Rajasthan Legislative Assembly
- Bhilwara district
