= Devnarayan =

Gurjar ruler and deity from Rajasthan

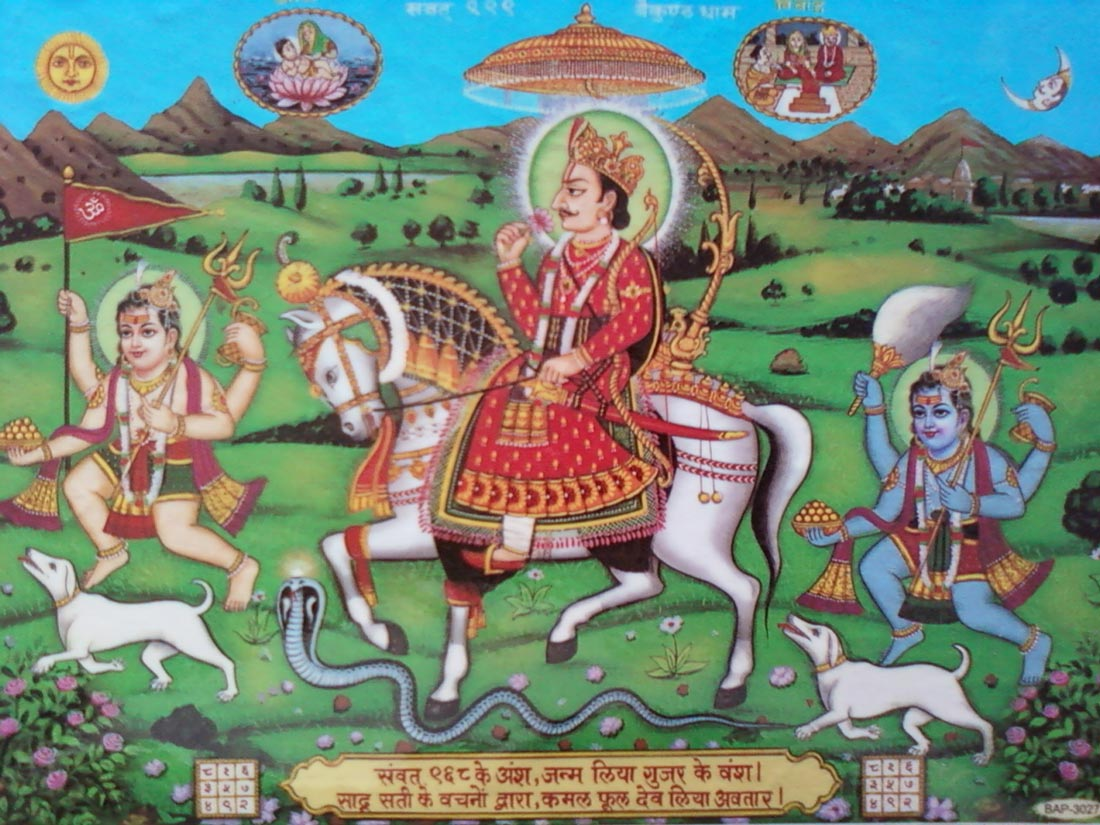
- Associate: Gurjars
- Weapon: Sword, Spear
- Adherents: shiva Kedarnath
- Region: Rajasthan, Uttar Pradesh, Madhya Pradesh
- Festivals: Devnarayan Jayanti, Makar Sakranti, Dev Ekadashi

Genealogy
- Born: Maagh V.S. 968 (911 A.D.); Malaseri Dungari, Asind city in Bhilwara district
- Parents: Rawat Rao Swai Bhoj Chauhan Gurjar (father); Mata Sadu Satwanti Khatana (mother)
- Consort: Pipalde
- Children: Bila (son) and Bili (daughter)

Devnarayan was a ruler and Hindu deity from Rajasthan, India. He is regarded as an incarnation of Vishnu and is worshipped primary in Rajasthan and northwestern Madhya Pradesh. He was born to Rawat Rao Sri Savai Bhoj Gurjar and Sadu mata in Chauhan gotra of the Gurjar community.

The epic of Devnarayan is one of the longest and most popular religious oral narratives of Rajasthan. The epic of Devnarayan has been classified under the category of martial epics.

== Early life ==
According to tradition he was in Malaseri Dungari, Asind city of Bhilwara district, Rajasthan to Sri Savai Bhoj and Sadu mata on the seventh day of the bright half (shukla saptami) of the month of Maagh in the Hindu Calendar in Vikram Samvat 968 (911 AD) in a Gurjar community. There are different views on his historical period. One view place him in the 10th century of the Vikram Samvat era, while another places him, between 1200 and 1400 (Vikram Samvat). The earlier date appears closer to the historical evidence.

== The narrative of Devnarayan ==
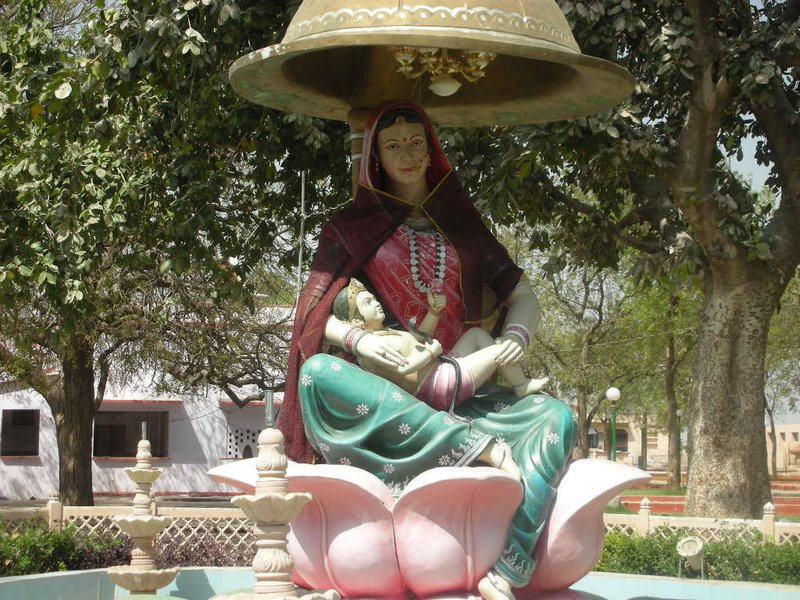
Saadu Maata Gurjari With her son Shri Devnarayan Bhagwan when he incarnated in lotus leaf at Maalasheri.

The oral epic of Devnarayan consists of a number of episodes related to the narrative of Devnarayan. This epic is sung by the Bhopas, the traditional priest-singers of Devnarayan during the nights of the months, November to July in the villages of Rajasthan and Malwa.

The narrative begins with an invocation of a number of deities, whose images are depicted in the phads. The deities invoked are Sharada, Ganesha, Sarasvati, Maccha, Kacchap, Varaha, Narasimha, Vaman, Parashuram, Ram and Krishna Avatars of Vishnu, Bhairunath, Ramdev, Shani, Surya and Chandrama. The first part called the Bagaravat Bharat is about the heroic deeds of 24 Bagaravat Gurjar brothers, who are born as the sons of the man-lion, Baghji Gurjar. The 24 brothers die after a preordained period of 12 years in a battle against a chieftain of Ran city. The second part is about Bhagavan's incarnation as Devnarayan, the miracles he performs and the revenge he and his cousins ultimately take on the Ran city chieftain. Devnarayan's mother is Sadu Mata and his father Savai Bhoj, the most courageous of the 24 Bagaravats. Whereas the first part is generally said to be marked by suffering (dukh), pain, and death, the second is marked by the reunion, miracles and divine testimony (parcyo). The second part, thus entails a reversal of the first part: death and defeat are followed by birth and creation, finally resulting in the establishment of Devnarayan's image amongst his followers.

== Bagdawat Bharat ==
The narrative begins with a prelude at a time (Satya Yuga), when Brahma was performing a Vedic sacrifice (jug) in Pushkar. Brahma invited all the gods and Rsis to his sacrifice. Among them is a group of twenty-four Rsis living in the Nag Pahad, a mountain chain running parallel to Pushkar. The Rsis were disciples of Sankar (Shankara). Sankar forbade them from attending the sacrifice, but they insisted on going because they had received invitations from Brahma. Suddenly, Sankar grew ravenously hungry. The Rsis suggested eating the fruits growing in the forest which they consume for a living. But Sankar said that would not satisfy him. He wanted more than plain fruit. But nothing else was available in the forest. There was no cereal or grain either. So, he turned to his disciples and began consuming them one after another. After he had eaten them and satiated his hunger, he went to visit Brahma's sacrifice himself. The sacrifice came to a halt because of the sin Sankar had committed. He asks Brahma how he should atone for his sin, whereupon Brahma informed him that the only means would be to offer the Rsis his own body in a future existence, in which the Rsis are to be born as the twenty-four sons of a single father. This prelude is normally spoken and not sung.

The narrative then shifts to a more historical time (Kali yuga). During the reign of Vishal Dev Chauhan, the populace is being terrorized by a tiger that feeds on one individual every night. On one particular night, Hariram Gurjar offers to take the place of a boy whose turn it is to be eaten by the tiger. He sets up a trap for the tiger and beheads it. Then in order to wash the blood off his sword and to cleanse himself of the sin of slaughter, as it was a tradition among Gurjars, he goes to the holy lake of Pushkar carrying the lion's head on his shoulder. It is a full moon night (purnima). Exactly at the same time on the opposite bank of Pushkar Lake, daughter of Gurjar king Jagjan, Lila Sevri who has taken a vow never to see the face of a man is performing ablutions and bathing in the lake. While bathing, she sees the reflection of a man's body with the head of a tiger on the surface of the lake, and conceive.

Jagjan then allowed both to marry and also gifts half of his kingdom to Hariram Gurjar. After nine months their son is born. He has the head of a tiger and the body of a man and is named Baghji. Later because of his unusual and fearsome appearance, no one is willing to marry his daughter to him. He lives alone in a garden attended by a Brahman cook. Once, on the day of the festival of savan tij (swings), a number of young girls of various GurjarGotras come to the garden attracted by Baghji's silken swing. The Brahman allows them to use the swing on the condition that each of them circumambulate Baghji. While they are doing this, the Brahman performs the necessary engagement rites. Unknowingly they are engaged to Baghji.

Later Baghji Gurjar marries twelve ladies of them namely Kanta Kalas, Ganiyanvanti Kalas, Lakmade Rathod, Jyanta Saradana, Lali Saradana, Balma Saradana, Barnavanti Chad, Bindka Chad, Dhanvantari Chechi, Gauri Chechi, Rama Awana and Bindra Awana. These all women were from Gurjar community and belong to Kalas, Rathod, Sangu, Saradana, Chad, Chechi and Awana clans (or Gotras). Each of his wives gives birth to two sons who are collectively called the Bagdawats.

According to written literature by anandaram phagna Baghji (Father of Bagdawats ) belonged to Chhatrapatti Chauhan gotra of Gurjars. Savai Bhoj is the most well-known and courageous of the twenty-four Bagdawats. Each day Savai Bhoj takes the Bagdawats cattle herds to graze on the slopes of Nag Pahad. One of the cows regularly leaves the herd and returns on its own in the evening. One day Savai Bhoj follows the cow and discovers that it is being milked by the jogi (ascetic) Rupnath. As compensation for milking their cow, Rupnath gives Savai Bhoj a sack full of grain. But the brothers have no use for the small quantity of grain, so they feed it to birds. The next morning, Nevaji, one of the youngest brothers, discovers that the few grains left sticking to the seam of the sack have turned into gems. They realize their folly and Savai Bhoj returns to Rupnath to become his disciple.

One day, being instructed by Rupnath, Savai Bhoj heats a cauldron of oil and circles it, while Rupnath follows. While they are circling the cauldron, Rupnath tries to push Savai Bhoj into the boiling oil, but Savai Bhoj leaps over with the help of his cowherd's staff. In the next round, Savai Bhoj follows Rupnath and pushes him into the cauldron. Not so agile, Rupnath falls into the boiling oil. Instantly his body turns into a solid gold nugget. While Savai Bhoj stands there repenting his crime, the jogi reappears in the hermitage as though nothing had taken place. He explains that the golden nugget is a gift that will grant the Bagdawats unending wealth for a period of twelve years after which both wealth (maya) and life (kaya) shall come to an end. He also gives Savai Bhoj the gifts of a mare-Bavli, a cow-Suremata, and an elephant-Jaimangala, all of which have special powers. Savai Bhoj returns to his home. The brothers ask Tejaji, the eldest among them, what should they do with their newly acquired wealth. Tejaji advises them to bury the money in the ground and heard it. But, Nevaji suggests that they do good deeds with the money, like building wells and temples, distributing the wealth and make a name for themselves since both the wealth and their lives will end after twelve years. The brothers choose the latter alternative. Soon their fame spreads far and wide. In due course, they meet their future enemy, Durjansal, the king Rana (or Ravji) (ruler) of Ran City.

The Rana and the Bagdawats become Dharam-brothers. In an extended drinking session in a garden named naulakha bagh near Ran city, they overturn jars laden with wine onto a hillside flooding the earth to such an extent that the wine actually flows down into the kingdom of Basak Nag (Vasuki), serpent lord of the netherworld, who holds the earth on his hood. Angered, king Basak deposits the earth temporarily on a bull's horns and goes to Bhagavan (Vishnu)'s court to complain about the Bagdawats. But neither Basak, nor Hanuman, nor Bhagavan can do anything to remedy the situation because the Bagdawats are so powerful. Finally, Bhagavan assumes the form of the mendicant (jogi) and visits Sadu Mata, the wife of Savai Bhoj, begging for alms. Sadu, who has just completed performing ablutions and bathing, appears in front of the mendicant covered only by her long tresses. Struck by her devotion, the mendicant (Bhagavan) grants her a boon. Sadu desires that Bhagavan is born as her son. Bhagavan promises to be born as her son on the 13th day after the Bagdawats have been killed.

After his return, Bhagavan requests Sakti (Durga or Bhavani), who agrees to go to earth to fulfill the task of destroying the Bagdawats. She manifests herself as an infant girl (later known as Jaimati) in a forest where she is discovered by the King of Bhual, who adopts her. Exactly at the time of her birth, her maidservant Hira is born. Jaimati grows up unusually fast. And, soon Brahmans are sent out to find a suitable bridegroom for her. She insists that they find someone belonging to a family in which one father has 24 sons. After a long and frustrating search, the Brahmans find the Bagdawats. They arrange to have the queen married to Savai Bhoj. But because they already married, the Bagdawats suggest that the queen is married to their dharam-brother, the Rana. Thus, arrangements are made for the Rana to marry Jaimati. When the marriage procession sets out, Savai Bhoj instead of the Rana leads it. In the meanwhile Jaimati orders the toran to be hung in a high place that the Rana, who is 120 years old and feeble cannot reach up to. Instead of the Rana, Savai Bhoj strikes down the toran.

When the marriage procession arrives, the queen pretends she has a high fever. She asks her maidservant to bring Savai Bhoj's sword that is supposed to have healing powers. In the inner chambers of the palace, she then circles the sword, thereby secretly marrying Savai Bhoj. In public, however, she marries the Rana. At the end of the ceremonies, when she is to accompany the Rana to her new home, she insists on staying with the Bagdawats. The Bagdawats coax her into going with the Rana, promising to fetch her after a period of six months. Upon arriving in Rana's palace, however, the queen says she will not play dice with the Rana till he has constructed a new palace for her. The construction of the palace, of course, takes a long time, and six months are soon over. In the meanwhile, the Bagdawats - even against the advice of their wives - prepare to fetch the queen. The queen elopes with the Bagdawats. The Rana is patient, advising the Bagdawats in a brotherly manner to send the queen back to him. But, the Bagdawats stick to their decision. Finally, the Rana gathers together the armies to fifty-two forts on the banks of the Khari river.

Jaimati, who now has assumed her true form, Bhavani promises to accompany the Bagdawats only on the condition if they fight Rana's army one at a time. She also demands that the brothers offer their heads to her. The Bagdawats willingly agree to her grotesque demands. A Bharat (great war) is fought. In the battle, some of the brothers continue fighting even after their heads have been severed by the Goddess's discus. But in the end, all of them are slain and the Rana is victorious. The Goddess assumes her Virat Rup (awesome, terrifying form). Amidst the corpses of slain warriors, she squats on the battleground, dripping with blood, stringing a necklace of the Bagdawats' severed heads. After their deaths, the Bagdawats' wives with the exception of Savai Bhoj's wife, Sadu Mata, commit sati (self-immolation).

== Shri Devnarayan Katha ==
This half of the narrative begins with Sadu Mata's severe tapas (penance) on a hill near the battlefield. After eleven days, when her honour and life is about to be threatened by the Rana, she calls out to Bhagavan, who has promised to be born as her son. Devnarayan, who is playing a game of dice at the time with king Basak, rises up on a stream of water that splits apart the rock on which Sadu is seated. Borne on that jet of water in a lotus blossom, the infant Devnarayan falls into Sadu Mata's lap.

Threatened by the Rana, Sadu Mata decides to flee to her natal home in Malwa. Devnarayan spends his childhood there without any knowledge of past events. After eleven years, one-day Chochu Bhat, the bard and genealogist of the 24 Bagaravat brothers comes to Malwa in search of Devnarayan. Sadu Mata who knows of his intentions tries to get him killed by poisoning, but Devnarayan revives him. Chochu Bhat then informs him of the battle between the Bagaravats and the Rana. Devnarayan then decides against his mother's will to return to his fathers ancestral land and take revenge on the Rana. While returning to the region of Bhilwara and his capital town of Causla Kheda, Devnarayan marries three princesses, one the daughter of a det (daitya), another the niece of a netherworld serpent king, and the third the daughter of the Gurjar ruler of Ujjain-Pipalde. While returning Devnarayan also meets up with his four cousins, Mehnduji, Madanji, Kanh Bhangi and Bhunaji, who likewise have grown up unaware of each other's existence. Whereas Mehnduji have been under the protection of the Bagaravat's ally, the king of Ajmer, Bhangi has grown up as a Nath Jogi in the company of the Bagaravats' guru Baba Rupnath.

Madanji has been growing up with his father Tejaji Gurjar. Bhunaji, whose name has been changed to Khanderav, has been adopted by the Rana himself. But once the cousins realize their true origins, they join up with Devnarayan to launch an assault against the Rana. Before the final encounter takes place, Devnarayan releases his herd of 980,000 cows and buffaloes in the royal fields in order to destroy the Rana's crops. In the end, the cousins catch up with the Rana who is trying to escape. He is beheaded by Devnarayan's bow-string. But when Devnarayan sees that Bhunaji is sad over the death of his foster father, he revives the Rana only after Chochu Bhat has extracted the Bagaravats' revenge from the Rana's stomach. Thereafter Devnarayan instructs the revived Rana to establish the city of Udaipur, which according to the narrative is named after one of Devnarayan's names, Ud.Bhagwaan Dev Narayan was born on Shanivaar, Saptami Shukla Paksh of Maagh month and the year was Vikrami Samwat 968 (911 AD). Bhagwaan Dev Narayan lived a very short life of 31 years on earth. He went to BaikunthDhaam on Akshya Tritiya Shukla Paksh of Baisakh month in Vikrami Samwat 999 (942 AD). This was the time when Samrat Mahedra Pal divided his vast Empire between his two sons and loyalty of Gurjar feudatories like Chauhan Gurjars, Gurjar Parmar Gurjars, Chandilla Gurjars were divided.

Ultimately around 915 AD. Samrat Mahi Pal established himself on the throne of the Gurjar Empire but a great clan of Bagarawat Chauhans of Gurjars was already sacrificed due to this division of loyalties of various feudatory kings and their vassals to these two Gurjar Pratihar Princes.

After Devnarayan has accomplished taking revenge on the Rana, he decides to depart to Baikunth (heaven). But his Queen Pipalde requests him not to leave her childless. A boy Bila and a girl, Bili are born to her. Bili is quick to realize her father's divinity. But Bila is stubborn and refuses to acknowledge his father's authority. After many unhappy incidents including being befallen by leprosy, Bila begins to realize the divine power of his father. He then agrees to look after Devnarayan's very first shrine and become Devnarayan's first priest from which the lineage of priests follow. Then, having established a place of worship, a lineage of priests, and a community of devotees, Devnarayan finally returns in his celestial chariot to Baikunth.

According to the epic, Infant Devnarayan was suckled by a lioness. That gave rise to famous Rajasthani Proverb Gurjari Jaayan, Nahari Jaayan, which translated as Son of a Gurjar is no less than a Lion.

== Devnarayan shrines and phad ==
The principal shrine of Devnaryan is located at Sawai Bhoj near Asind town, the battlefield of Bagravat Bharat. Other significant shrines are at Demali, which is believed as the earliest shrine founded by Devnarayan himself and Malasari, where Devnarayan was born. Devnarayan is worshiped in these shrines in the form of an upright row of large sized bricks. The bricks are often kept bare, but sometimes the multi-colored tinsel is pasted over them.

Another significant shrine of Devnarayan is located at Jodhpuriya near Mashi dam in Tonk district. Two fairs are organized each year near this shrine.

Rana Sanga of Mewar was great devotee of Shri Devnarayan Gurjar and he is said to have built a temple in memory of Deoji.

=== Devnarayan phad ===
Devnarayan is also worshiped by the Gurjar Bhopas, the priest-singers by means of a scroll known as phad, depicting various episodes of the narrative of the life of Devnaryan. This scroll, Devnarayan phad, is used as a mobile temple and the Bhopas carry it with them. The Joshi families of Bhilwara and Shahpura are the traditional artists of the Devnarayan phads. A phad consists of an image of Devnarayan in the attire of a king seated on his "python" throne in his court faced by the serpent king Basak and his four cousins at the centre. The whole phad is painted with various scenes related to the narrative of Devnarayan according to a traditional scheme. No place is left vacant. These phads are normally about 30 feet in length. One of the earliest surviving Devnarayan phad is in the collection of Rupayan Sansthan, the Rajasthan Institute of Folklore in Jodhpur. This phad is signed by Surajmal and Bagtavarchand and dated Vikram Samvat 1924 (1867).

A Bhopa, usually erects the phad shortly after nightfall in the villages where he is invited to sing different episodes from the epical narrative of Devnarayan in front of the phad during the jagarans (night-wakes). Before the performance begins, the ground beneath is swept clean, incense is burnt and the offerings of grains and money are made in front of the phad. During the performance, a jantar (a type of fretted veena with two resonators of gourd or wood) is played to accompany the songs. Usually, there are two Bhopas who recite the epic, one is the main Bhopa, the Patavi, and the other is his assistant, the Diyala. When the Patavi Bhopa sings a particular episode of the epic, his junior partner, the Diyala Bhopa holds an oil lamp to illuminate the particular part of the phad, where the particular episode which is being sung is depicted. He also sings along with his senior partner some parts of the episodes. The phad of devnarayan ji issue a post ticket on 2 September 1992.

== Priests and temples ==
The Bhopas or priests of Devnaraya temples belong to the Gurjar ethnic community. Devnarayan is mainly worshiped by Gurjars in villages across East Gujarat, North Gujarat, Rajasthan, and western Madhya Pradesh.

Devnarayana's temples are mostly found across Rajasthan, East Gujarat, North Gujarat, Madhya Pradesh. These all temples were built by the Gurjars in these states.

In January 2023, during the 1111th birth anniversary of Lord Shri Devnarayan, Prime minister of India (Narendra Modi) announce the Devnarayan Corridor. Anniversary was held at Malaseri Dungri, situated in Bhilwara district, home to a famous Devnarayan temple. At this event nearly 3 lakh Gujjars from different Indian states took part, including Rajasthan, Gujarat, Punjab, Haryana, Delhi, Himachal Pradesh, Jammu-Kashmir and Madhya Pradesh.

== Recognition ==
A commemorative stamp was issued by India post on 2 Sep 1992 of denomination 5 Indian rupee.

A commemorative stamp was issued by India post on 3 Sep 2011 of denomination INR 5.

== See also ==
- Gurjara
- Gurjar
- Gurjara-Pratihara
- Gujari
- Gurjari (raga)
- Devmali
- History of Rajasthan

== Bibliography ==
1. Anandaram Phagana (1971, in Hindi Month Falgun Vikram samvat, 2027). Bagrawat Bharat -Veer Gurjar Utpatti, Archana Prakashan, Ajmer.
2. Borana, Ramesh (2004). Bagrawat Mahabharat, Rajasthan Sangeet Natak Academy, Jodhpur.
3. Chundawat, Laxmikumari (1977). Bagrawat Devnarayan Mahagatha, Rajkamal Prakashan, New Delhi.
4. Malik, Aditya (1993). Rajasthani Oral Epic of Devnarayan, New Delhi.
5. Malik, Aditya (2005). Nector Gaze and Poison Breath: An Analysis and Translation of Rajasthani Oral Narrative of Devnarayan, New York: Oxford University Press, ISBN 0-19-515019-8.
6. Miller, Joseph Charles, Jr. (1994). The Twenty-four Brothers and Lord Devnarayan: The Story and Performance of a Folk Epic of Rajasthan, India, University of Pennsylvania, Pennsylvania.
