= Devmali =

Devmali Deomali
- Village
- Location in Rajasthan, India Devmali (India)
- Coordinates: 26.05°N 74.498°E
- Country: India
- State: Rajasthan
- District: Beawar

Languages
  - Official: Hindi
- Time zone: UTC+5:30 (IST)
- PIN: 305623

Devmali (also pronounced as Deomali) is a village in Beawar district, Rajasthan, India. It is popular for its belief that all houses in the village are made of medieval times style. People of this village are predominantly Gurjars and worship Hindu deity Devnarayan.

In September 2024, Devmali village has been named as Best Tourist Village in India.
