= Dev Dham Jodhpuriya =

- Temple of Devnarayan
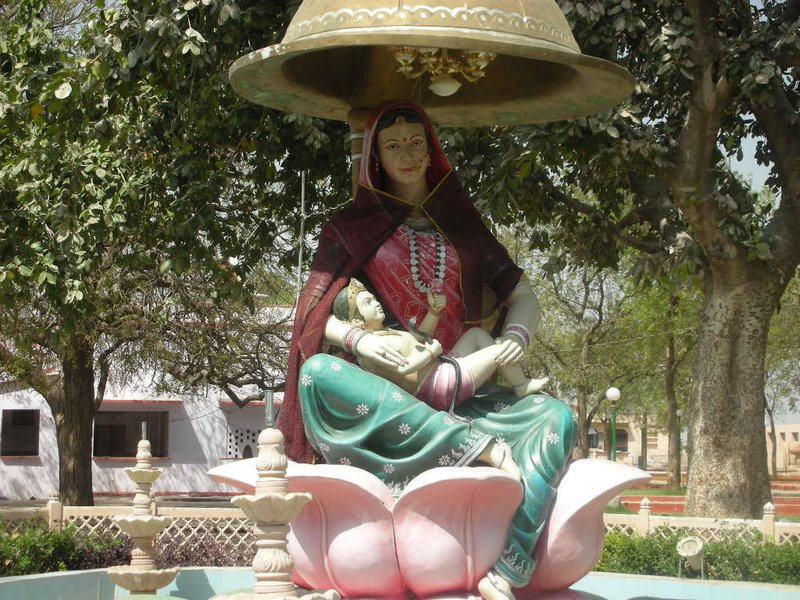
- Image of Saadu Maata Gurjari at Dev Dham Jodhpuriya

- Location in Rajasthan, India Dev Dham Jodhpuriya (India)

Religion
- Affiliation: Hinduism
- District: Tonk

Location
- Location: Jodhpuriya
- State: Rajasthan
- Country: India
- Coordinates: 26.433073°N 75.77025°E

Dev Dham Jodhpuriya is a temple situated in the Tonk district of Rajasthan, India dedicated to the folk deity Devnarayan.

== Festivals ==
There are two fairs organised each year at the temple in memory of Devnarayan. During these, bhopas of Devnarayan make figures related to his birth.

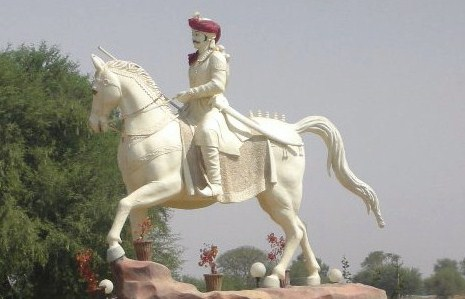
A statue at Jodhpuriya of Sawai Bhoj Gurjar, one of the 24 Gurjar brothers known as Bagaravat.

The temple is decorated with various statues. These include statues representing the cousins of Devnarayan, Bhuna and Mehandu, along with their half-sister, Taradey Panwar. Other statues commemorate, Sawai Bhoj, as well as depicting different events in his life.

== Aarati and Night vigils ==
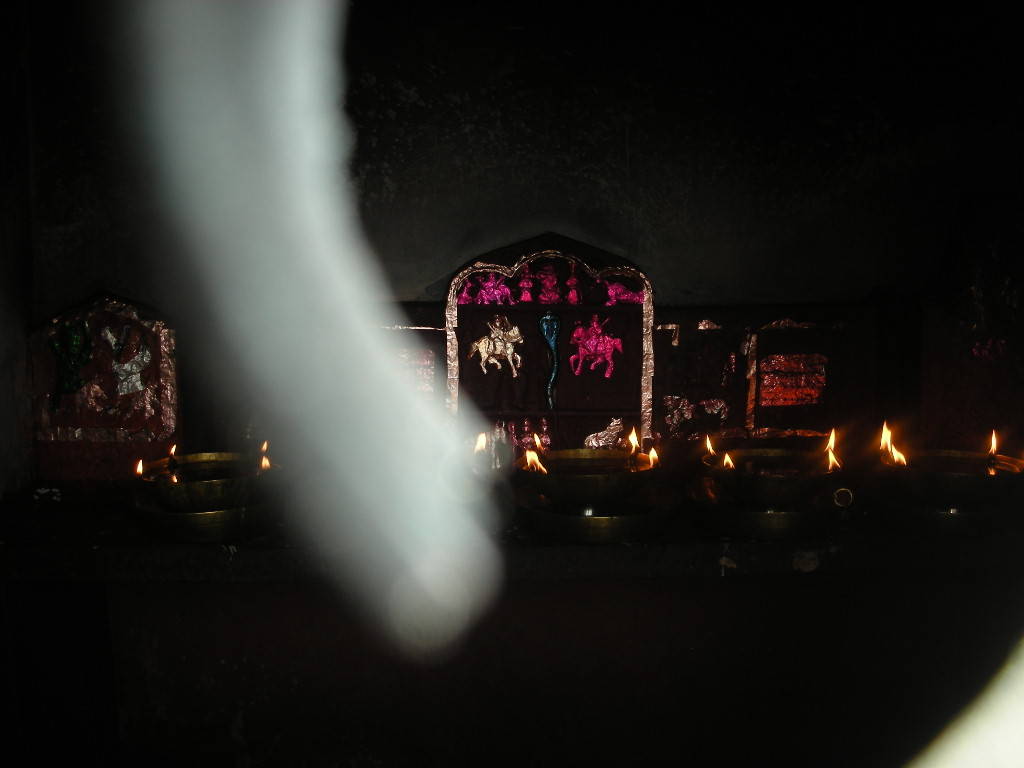
Akhand Jyoti, which was started by NaagaJi Baagri Gurjar, founder of Manoharpura.

Aarati (major worship) of Devnarayan takes place three times daily, at 4 am, 11 am and 7 pm. Friday is the day when devotees from distant villages and cities come to visit the temple.

Night vigils (jaagirn) are organised by many devotees, especially on Fridays and almost daily in the summer season.

The following quote can be observed on every image of Devnarayan:

"Samvat 968 ke aansh, janam liya Gurjar ke vansh
Sadhu sati ke vachno dwara, kamal phool Dev liya avatar."

This is translated as saying that he was incarnated in the Gurjar dynasty in 911 AD to fulfill the promise he gave to Saadu Maata Gurjari.
