= Jabbar Singh Sankhala =

Indian politician

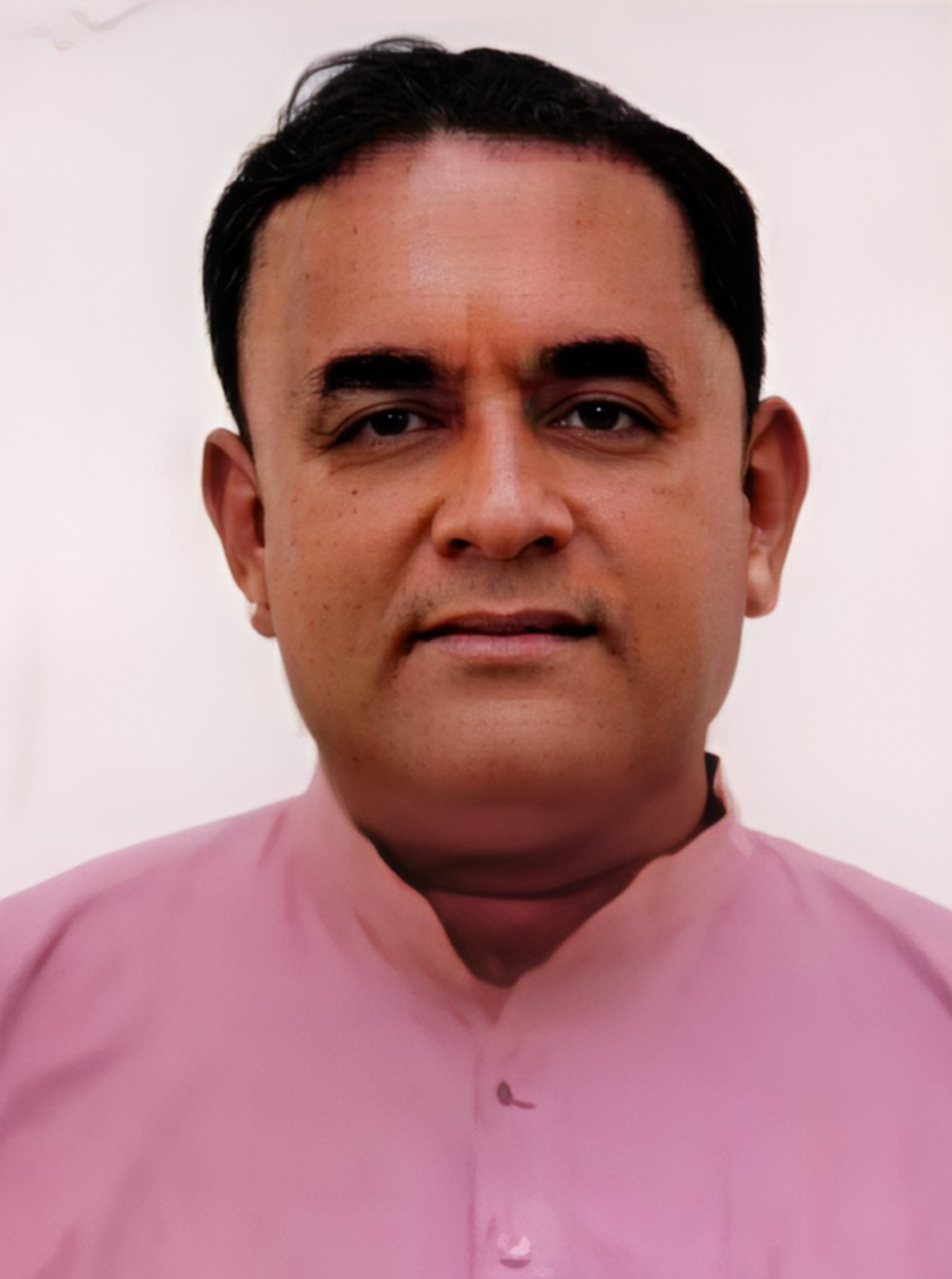

Member of the Rajasthan Legislative Assembly
- Incumbent
- Assumed office 2018-Present
- Constituency: Asind Assembly constituency

Personal details
- Born: 17 May 1968 (age 58) Asind, bhilwara
- Party: Bharatiya Janata Party
- Spouse: Manju Devi Sankhla
- Occupation: Politician

Jabbar Singh Sankhala is an Indian politician currently serving as a member of the 16th Rajasthan Legislative Assembly, representing the Asind constituency. He is a member of the Bharatiya Janata Party. He previously served as a member of the 15th Rajasthan Legislative Assembly, representing the same constituency from 2018 to 2023.

== Political career ==
In the 2018 Rajasthan Legislative Assembly election, he was elected as an MLA from the Asind constituency, defeating Manish Mewara by a margin of 154 votes.

Following the 2023 Rajasthan Legislative Assembly election, he was re-elected as an MLA from the Asind constituency, defeating Hagamilal Mewara, the candidate from the Indian National Congress (INC), by a margin of 1526 votes.
