= Ram Lal Gurjar =

Indian politician

Member of the Rajasthan Legislative Assembly
- Incumbent
- Assumed office 2013
- Constituency: Asind

Personal details
- Party: Bharatiya Janata Party
- Occupation: Politician

Ram Lal Gurjar is an Indian politician from the Bharatiya Janata Party who represents the Vidhan Sabha constituency of Rajasthan in the Rajasthan Legislative Assembly.
