= Gurjars =

Ethnic group in India, Pakistan, and Afghanistan

Gurjar
Regions with significant populations
- Afghanistan, Pakistan, India

Languages
- Gojri • Rajasthani • Gujarati • Hindi • Kashmiri • Punjabi • Urdu • Pashto • Haryanvi • Sindhi • Balochi • Pahari • Marathi

Religion
- Islam • Hinduism • Sikhism

Related ethnic groups
- Jats • Rajputs • Ahirs and other Indo-Aryan People

The Gurjar (or Gujjar, Gujar, Gurjara) are an agricultural ethnic community, residing mainly in India, Pakistan, and Afghanistan, divided internally into various clan groups. They were traditionally involved in agriculture, pastoral and nomadic activities and formed a large heterogeneous group. The historical role of Gurjars has been quite diverse in society: at one end they have been found related to several kingdoms and, at the other end, some are still nomads with no land of their own.

The pivotal point in the history of Gurjar identity is often traced back to the emergence of a Gurjara kingdom in present-day Rajasthan and Gujarat during the Middle Ages (around 570 CE). It is believed that the Gurjars migrated to different parts of the Indian Subcontinent from the Gurjaratra.

The Gurjaras started fading from the forefront of history after the 10th century CE. Thereafter, history records several Gurjar chieftains and upstart warriors, who were rather petty rulers in contrast to their predecessors. Gujar or Gujjar were quite common during the Mughal era, and documents dating from the period mention Gujars as a 'turbulent' people.

The Indian states of Gujarat and Rajasthan were known as Gurjaradesa and Gurjaratra for centuries prior to the arrival of the British. The Gujrat and Gujranwala districts of Pakistani Punjab have also been associated with Gurjars from as early as the 8th century CE, when there existed a Gurjara kingdom in the same area. The Saharanpur district of Uttar Pradesh was also known as Gurjargadh previously, due to the presence of many Gurjar zamindars in the area.

Gurjars are linguistically and religiously diverse. Although they are able to speak the language of the region and country where they live, Gurjars have their own language, known as Gujari. They mostly follow Islam followed by Hinduism: As per a 1988 estimate, out of the total Gurjar population in the Indian subcontinent, 53% were followers of Islam, 46.8% were adherents of Hinduism while 0.2% were Sikhs.

The Hindu Gurjars are mostly found in Indian states of Rajasthan, Gujarat, Haryana, Madhya Pradesh, Punjab Plains and Maharashtra. Muslim Gurjars are mostly found in ths Pakistani provinces of Khyber Pakhtunkhwa and Punjab, mainly concentrated in Lahore and northern cities of Gujranwala, Gujrat, Gujar Khan and Jhelum; and in Indian Himalayan regions such as Jammu and Kashmir, Himachal Pradesh, Uttarakhand; and Afghanistan.

== Etymology ==
The word Gujjar represents a caste, a tribe and a group in India, Pakistan, and Afghanistan, locally referred to as jati, zaat, qaum or biradari.

It has been suggested by several historians that Gurjara was initially the name of a tribe or clan which later evolved into a geographical and ethnic identity following the establishment of a janapada (tribal kingdom) called 'Gurjara'. This understanding has introduced an element of ambiguity regarding ancient royal designations containing the word 'gurjara' such as gurjaraeshvara or gurjararaja, as now it is debatable whether the kings bearing these epithets were tribal or ethnic Gurjaras.

== History ==
=== Origin ===
Historians and anthropologists differ on the issue of Gurjar origin. According to one view, circa 1 CE, the ancient ancestors of the Gurjars came in multiple waves of migration and were initially accorded status as high-caste warriors in the Hindu fold in the North-Western regions (modern Rajasthan and Gujarat). Aydogdy Kurbanov states that some Gurjars, along with people from northwestern India, merged with the Hephthalites to become the Rajput clan.

Previously, it was believed that the Gurjars had migrated earlier on from Central Asia as well, however, this view is generally considered to be speculative.

According to B. D. Chattopadhyaya, historical references speak of Gurjara warriors and commoners in North India in the 7th century CE, and mention several Gurjara kingdoms and dynasties. However, according to Tanuja Kothiyal, the historical image of Gurjars is that of "ignorant" herders, though historical claims of Gurjar past also associate them with Gurjara-Pratiharas. She cites a myth that any Rajput claim Gurjars may have comes through a Rajput marrying a Brahmin woman, and not through an older Kshatriya clan. She says that the historical process suggests the opposite: that Rajputs emerged from other communities, such as Gurjars, Jats, Raikas etc.

The oldest known reference to the word Gurjara is found in the book called Harshacharita (Harsha's Deeds), a biography of king Harshavardhana written around 630 CE. Banabhatta, the author of Harshacharita, mentions that Harsha's father Prabhakravardhana (560-580 CE) was "a constant threat to the sleep of Gurjara"—apparently a reference to the Gurjara king or kingdom. Inscriptions from a collateral branch of Gurjaras, known as Gurjaras of Lata, claim that their family was ruling Bharakucha (Bharuch) as early as 450 CE from their capital at Nandipuri.

According to scholars such as Baij Nath Puri, the Mount Abu (ancient Arbuda Mountain) region of present-day Rajasthan had been an abode of the Gurjars during the medieval period. These Gurjars migrated from the Abu mountain region and as early as in the 6th century CE, they set up one or more principalities in Rajasthan and Gujarat. The whole or a larger part of Rajasthan and Gujarat had been long known as Gurjaratra (country ruled or protected by the Gurjars) or Gurjarabhumi (land of the Gurjars) for centuries prior to the Mughal period.

In Sanskrit texts, the ethnonym has sometimes been interpreted as "destroyer of the enemy": gur meaning "enemy" and ujjar meaning "destroyer").

=== Medieval period ===
Babur, in the context of revolt, wrote that Jats and Gujjars poured down from hills in vast numbers in order to carry off oxen and buffaloes and that they were guilty of the severest oppression in the country. Many Gurjars were converted to Islam at various times, dating back to Mahmud of Ghazni's raid in Gujarat in 1026. Gurjars of Awadh and Meerut date their conversion to Tamerlane, when he sacked Delhi and forcibly converted them. By 1525, when Babur invaded India, he saw that the Gurjars of northern Punjab were already Muslims. Until the 1700s, conversions continued under Aurangzeb, who converted the Gurjars of Himachal Pradesh by force. Pathans and Balochis drove Gurjar converts out of their land, forcing them into vagrancy.

=== British rule ===
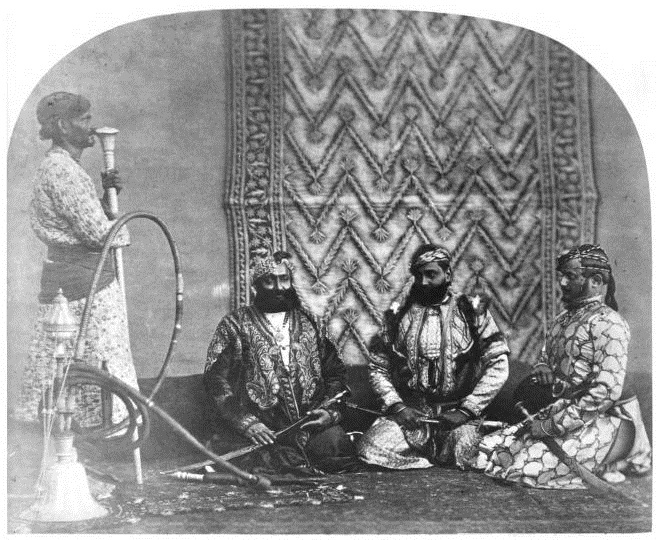
Gurjar sardars of Rajasthan during British era

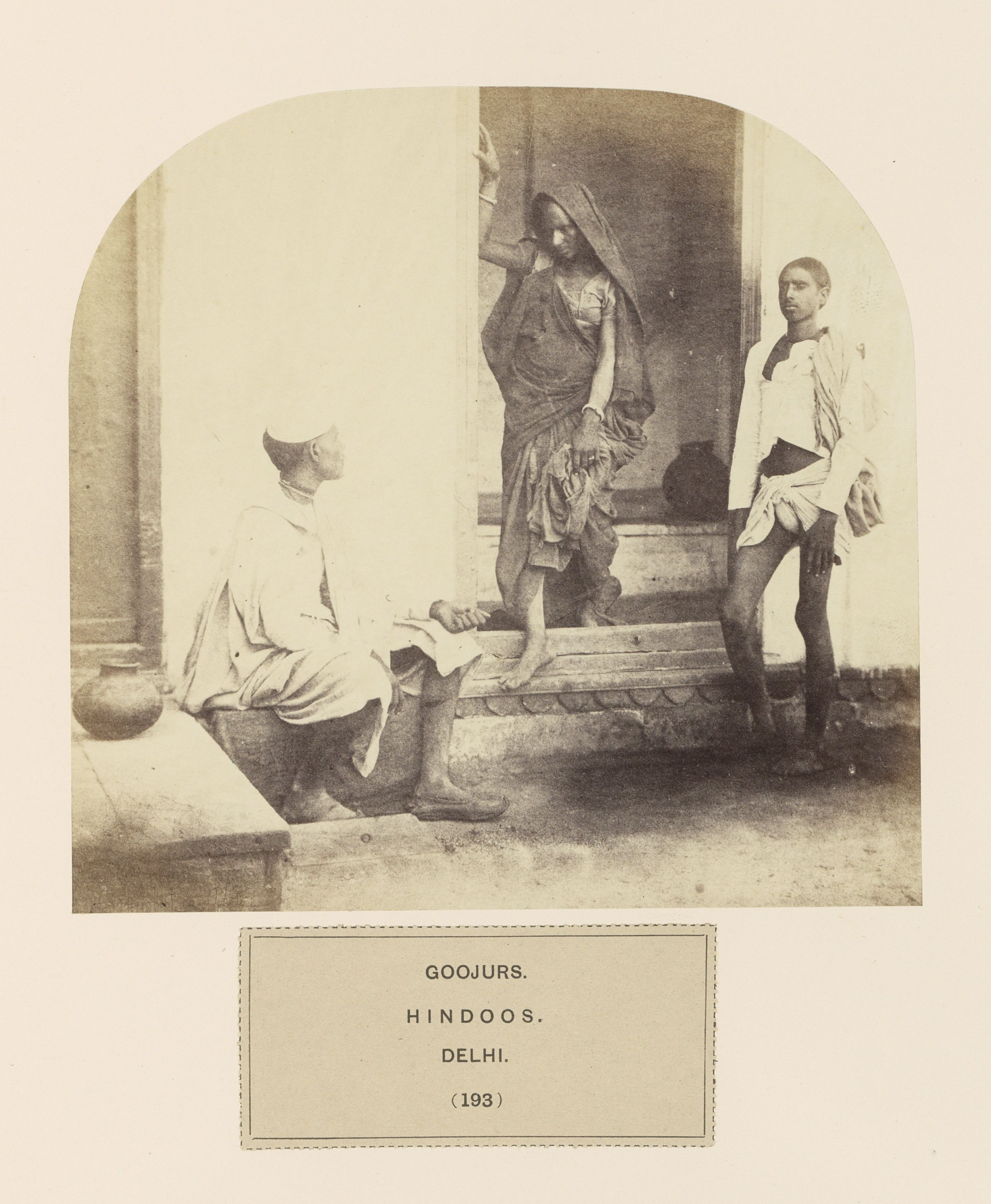
Two Gurjar men on a pavement and a woman in a doorway in Delhi, Shepherd & Robertson (possibly), ca.1859–69

In the 18th century, several Gurjar chieftains and small kings were in power. A fort in Parikshitgarh in Meerut district, also known as Qila Parikishatgarh, is ascribed to a Gurjar king Nain Singh Nagar. Morena, Samthar, Dholpur, Saharanpur and Roorkee were also some of the places ruled by Gurjar kings. Bhati Clan of Gurjars had significance influence in Bulandshahr joint magistracy. Rao Roshan Singh of Bhati clan was a landlord of wide area till 1812, other chiefs of this clan were, Shambu Singh, Ajit singh and Dargahi Singh Bhati. The Bhati Gurjars in this area had somewhat similar position as the Gurjar Rajas of Saharanpur area.

In Delhi, the Metcalfe House was sacked by Gurjar villagers from whom the land had been taken to erect the building. In September 1857, the British were able to enlist the support of many Gurjars at Meerut.

== Culture ==
=== Afghanistan ===
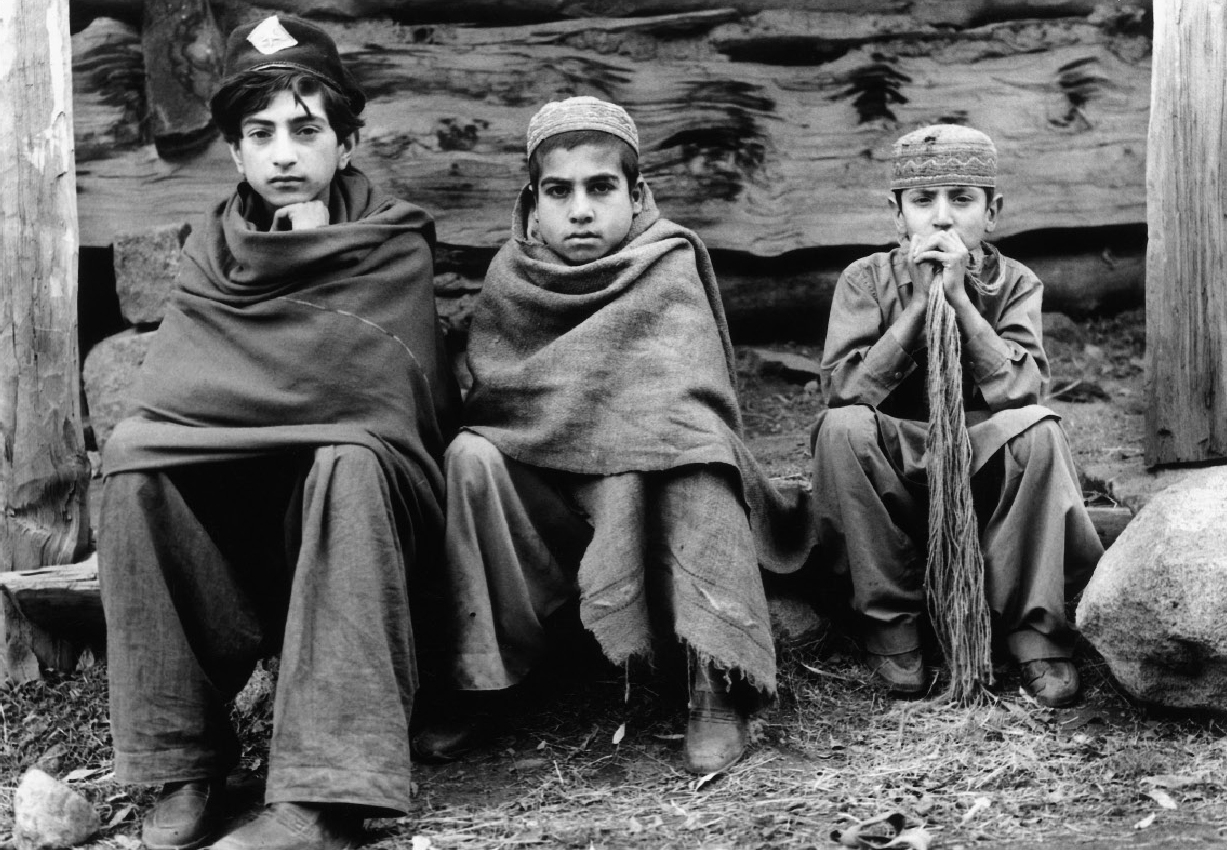
Gurjar children in Afghanistan, 1984

The Gurjar people are a tribal group who have lived in Afghanistan for centuries. According to the Afghanistan news agency Pajwok Afghan News, there are currently an estimated 1.5 million Gurjar people residing in the country. The Gurjar people are predominantly found in the northeastern regions of Afghanistan, including Kapisa, Baghlan, Balkh, Kunduz, Takhar, Badakhshan, Nuristan, Laghman, Nangarhar, and Khost. They have a distinct culture and way of life.

The old Afghanistan constitution officially recognised 14 ethnic groups, including the Gurjar ethnic group being one of them.

Many Gurjar tribal people in Afghanistan are deprived of their rights and their living conditions are poor. They have sometimes been internally displaced in the past by illegal militias; for example, during 2018 around 200 Gurjar families were displaced from their homes in Farkhar district in Takhar province.

During the COVID-19 pandemic, the Gurjar people in the northeastern province of Badakhshan used Andak meat to treat the corona virus, due to lack of clinics and other health facilities in their areas. The Gurjar Tribe Council deemed the meat of the Andak animal as haram (forbidden) but many Gurjar people in the area said they had no choice.

Gurjar tribal leaders met with Hamid Karzai when he was President of Afghanistan. They demanded schools and hospitals be built in their areas and the Afghan government give scholarships to Gurjar students to study abroad.

=== India ===
Today, the Gurjars are classified under the Other Backward Class category in some states in India. However, in Jammu and Kashmir and parts of Himachal Pradesh, they are designated as a Scheduled Tribe under the Indian government's reservation program of positive discrimination. Hindu Gurjars were assimilated into several varnas.

==== Delhi ====
Gurjars form an important component of Delhi. They have combined their traditional occupation of pastoralism and marginal cultivation over a large area in and around Delhi.

==== Haryana ====
The Gurjar community in Haryana has set elaborate guidelines for solemnizing marriages and holding other functions. In a mahapanchayat ("the great panchayat"), the Gujjar community decided that those who sought dowry would be excommunicated from the society.

==== Rajasthan ====
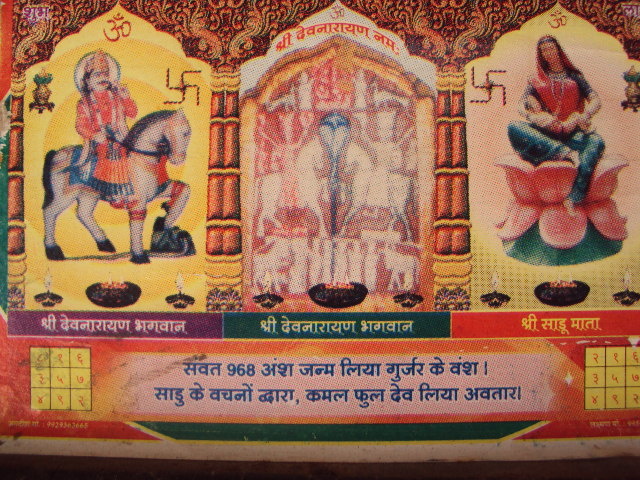
Fairs of Shri Devnarayan Bhagwan are organized two times in a year at Demali, Maalasheri, Asind and Jodhpuriya

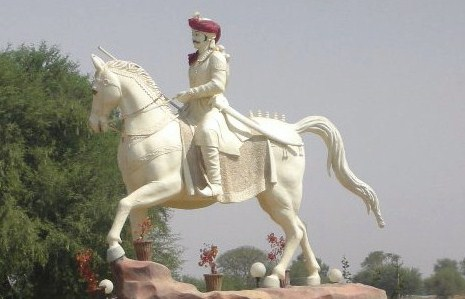
Statue of Sri Sawai Bhoj Bagaravat, one of the 24 Gujar brothers collectively known as Bagaravats, at Dev Dham Jodhpuriya temple.

The Rajasthani Gurjars worship Surya, Devnarayan (an avatar of Vishnu), Shiva and Bhavani. Gurjar Goth is collective chant-like singing sung by Gurjar men and women, the themes of songs generally being Devnarayan Katha. In Rajasthan, some members of the Gurjar community resorted to violent protests over the issue of reservation in 2006 and 2007. They demanded a change in their status from Other Backward Class (OBC) to Scheduled Tribe (ST). They felt marginalized and faced livelihood crises. During the 2003 election to the Rajasthan assembly, the Bharatiya Janata Party (BJP) promised them Scheduled Tribe status. However, the party failed to keep its promise after coming to the power, resulting in protests by the Gurjars in September 2006.

In May 2007, during violent protests over the reservation issue, members of the Gurjar community clashed with the police. Subsequently, the Gurjar protested violently, under various groups including the Gurjar Sangarsh Samiti, Gurjar Mahasabha and the Gurjar Action Committee. Presently, the Gurjars in Rajasthan are classified as Other Backward Class.

On 5 June 2007, Gurjars rioted over their desire to be added to the central list of tribes who are given favoured treatment under the reservation system. However, other tribes on the list oppose this request, as it would make it harder to obtain the few positions already set aside.

In December 2007, the Akhil Bhartiya Gurjar Mahasabha ("All-India Gurjar Council") stated that the community would boycott the BJP, which was in power in Rajasthan. But in 2009 the Gurjar community was supporting BJP so that they could be politically benefitted. Kirori Singh Bainsla fought and lost on the BJP ticket. In the early 2000s, the Gurjar community in Dang region of Rajasthan was also in news its falling sex ratio, unavailability of brides, and the resultant polyandry.

==== Madhya Pradesh ====
As of 2022, the Gurjars in Madhya Pradesh are classified as Other Backward Classes.

==== Maharashtra ====
In Maharashtra, Gurjars are in very good numbers in Jalgaon District. Dode Gurjars and Dore Gurjars are listed as Other Backward Classes in Maharashtra.

==== Gujarat ====
The State took its name from the Gurjara, the land of the Gurjars, who ruled the area during the 700s and 800s.

They are listed among the Other Backward Classes of Gujarat.

A few scholars believe that the Leva Kunbis (or Kambis) of Gujarat, a section of the Patidars, are possibly of Gurjar origin. However, several others state that the Patidars are Kurmis or Kunbis (Kanbis); Gurjars are included in the OBC list in Gujarat but Patidars are not.

Gurjars of North Gujarat, along with those of Western Rajasthan and Punjab, worship Sitala and Bhavani.

==== Himachal Pradesh ====
As of 2001, the Gurjars in parts of Himachal Pradesh were classified as a Scheduled Tribe.

==== Jammu and Kashmir ====
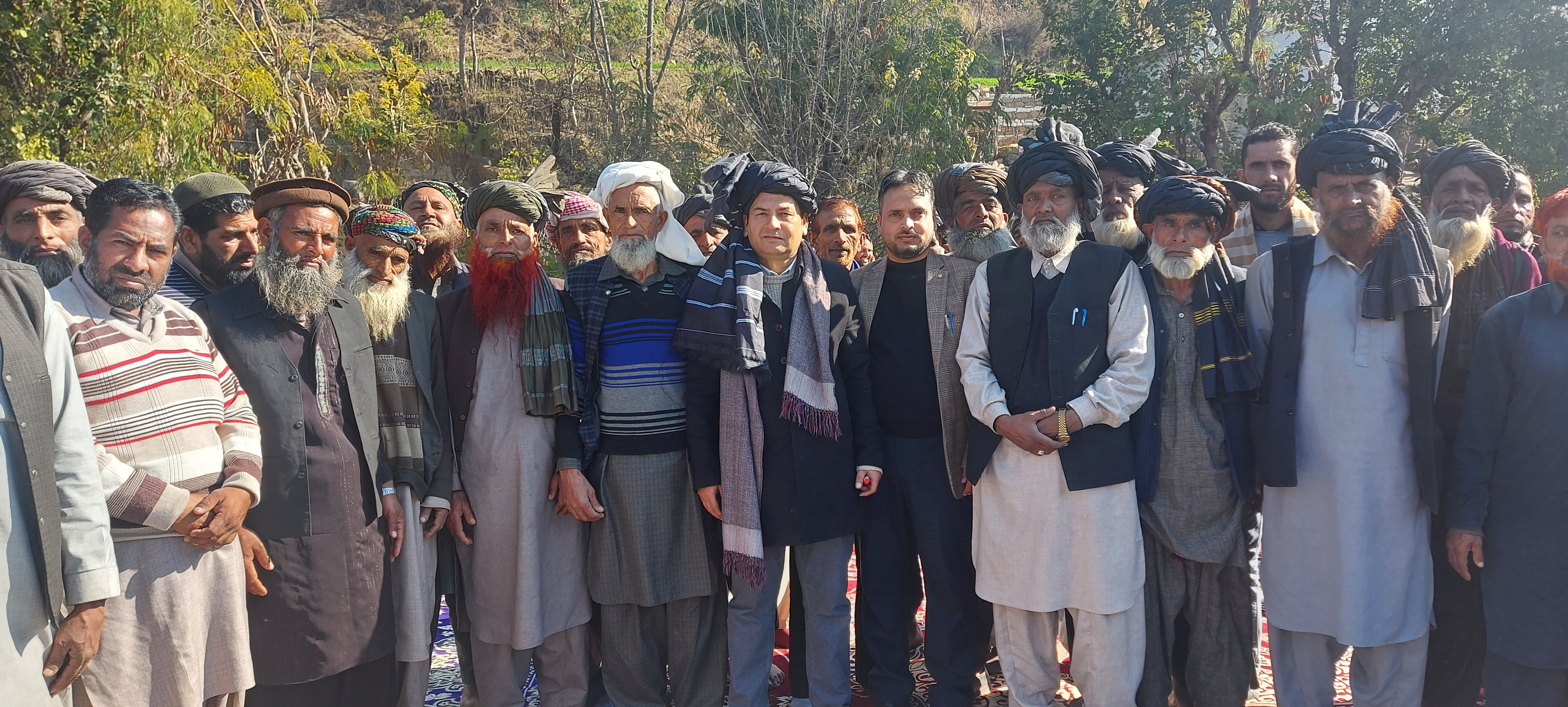
Bakarwals (Gujjar Shepherd) from Jammu and Kashmir

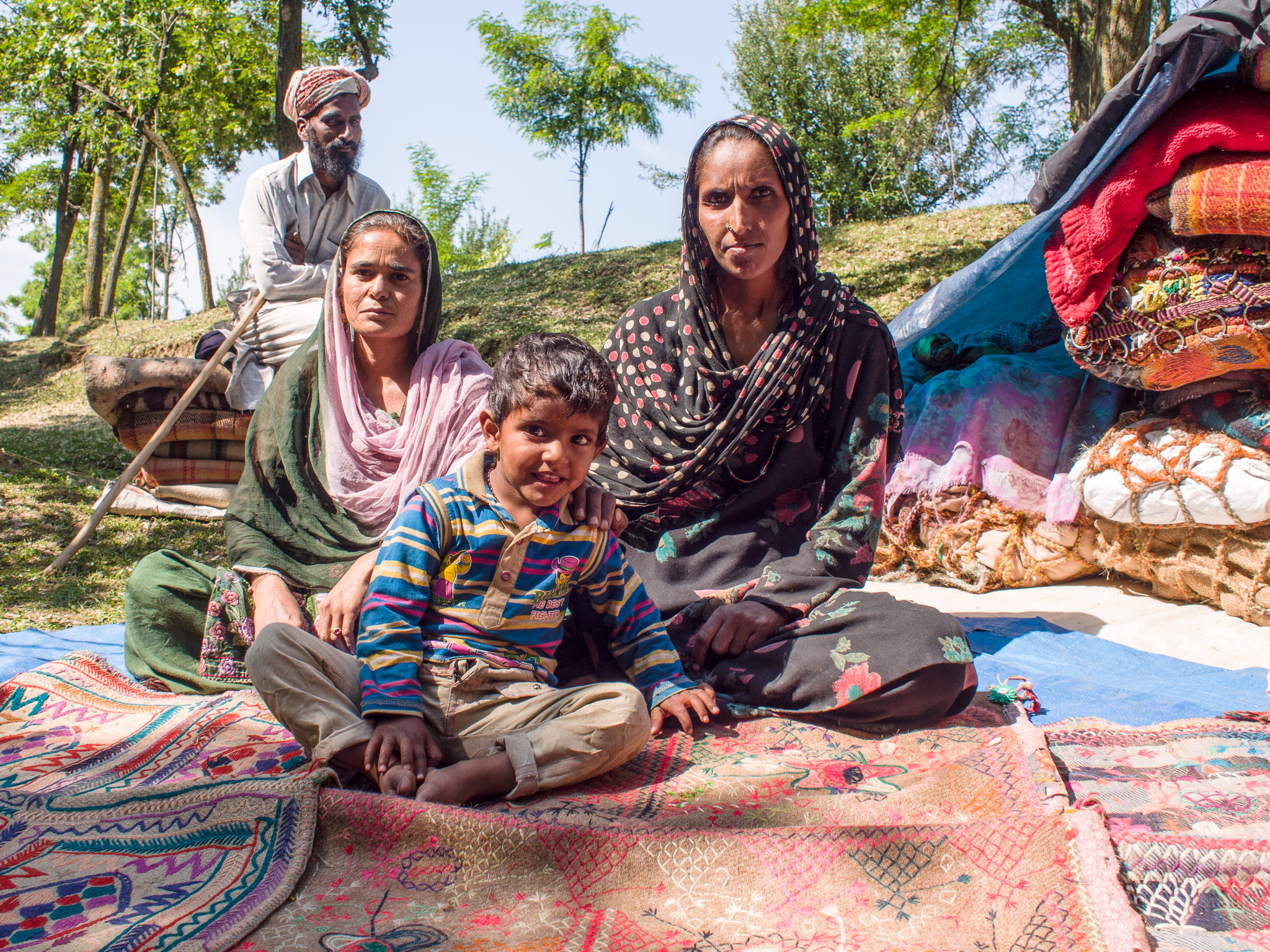
Gurjar family with their embroidery

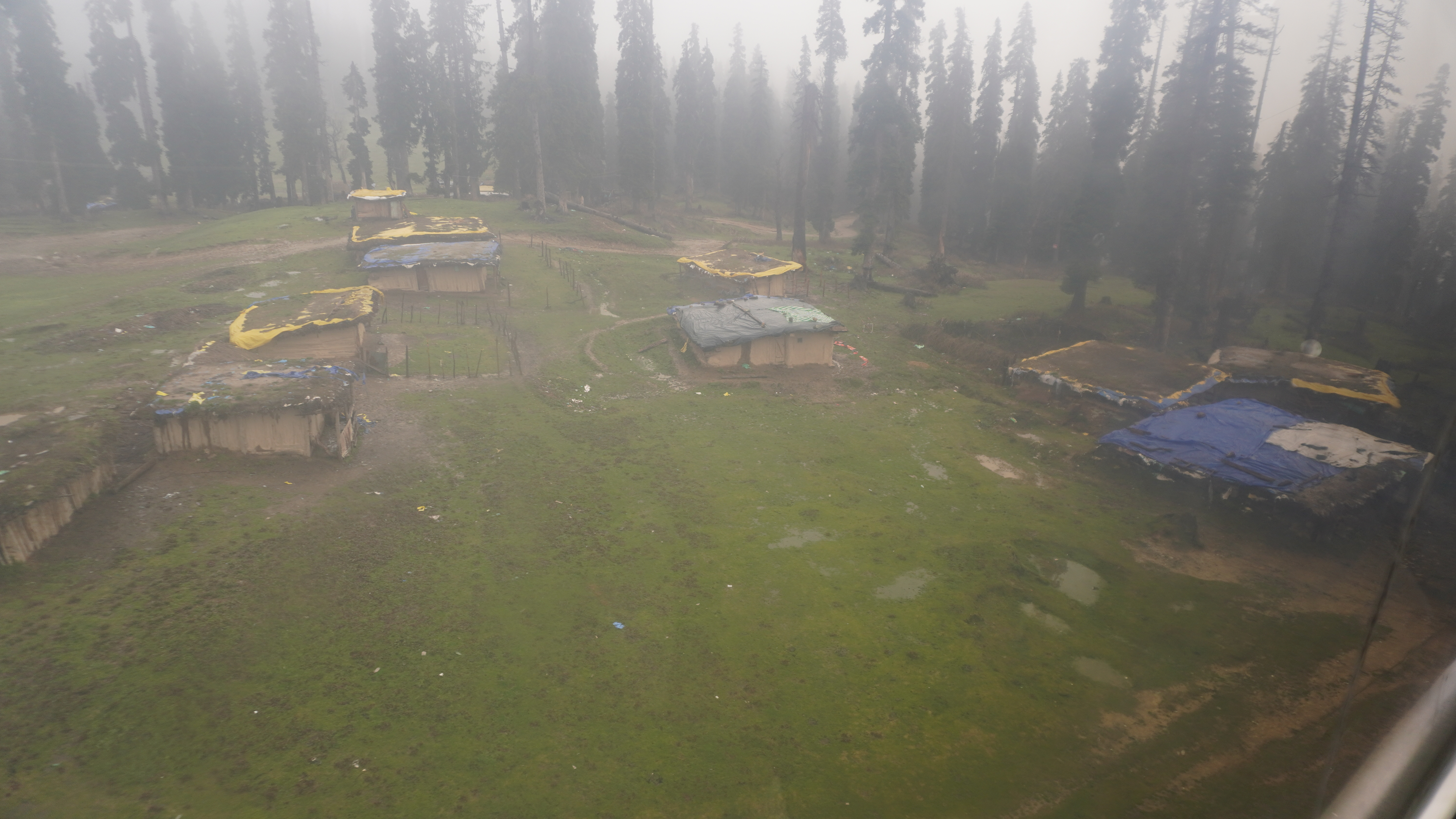
vacant seasonal homes of the Bakarwal and Gujjar communities, which they will reoccupy in the next season.

The Gurjars and Bakerwals tribes of Jammu and Kashmir were declared a Scheduled Tribe (ST) in 1991. At the 2001 census, they were found principally in Rajouri, Poonch, Reasi, Kishtwar district, with presences elsewhere. It is believed that Gurjars migrated to Jammu and Kashmir from Gujarat (via Rajasthan) and Hazara district of Khyber Pakhtunkhwa.

As of 2011, the Gurjars and the Bakarwals in Jammu and Kashmir were classified as Scheduled Tribes constitute 12% of the total population of Jammu and Kashmir. However, they claim that they constitute more than 20% of the population, and allege undercounting because of their nomadic lifestyle, saying that when the censuses were held in 2001 and 2011, half of their population had been in the upper reaches of the Himalaya. According to the 2011 Census of India, Gurjars are the most populous scheduled tribe in Jammu and Kashmir, having a population of nearly 1.5 million. Nearly all of them follow Islam.

The Gurjars of Jammu and Kashmir in 2007 demanded that this tribal community be treated as a linguistic minority in the erstwhile state and provided with constitutional safeguards for their language Gojri. They also pressured the state government to urge the central government to include Gojri in the list of official languages of India.

In 2002, some Gurjars and Bakarwals in Jammu and Kashmir demanded a separate state called Gujaristan for Gujjar and Bakarwal communities, under the banner of All India Gurjar Parishad. Gurjars and Bakarwals have at times been targeted by militants of the insurgency in the territory, such as during the Kot Charwal and Teli Katha massacres.

==== Uttarakhand ====
Taukeer Alam sharing the Van Gujjar wedding rituals and clothings

The Van Gujjars ("forest Gurjars") are found in the Shivalik Hills area of Uttarakhand. The Van Gujjars follow Islam, and they have their own clans, similar to the Hindu gotras. They are a pastoral semi-nomadic community, practising transhumance. In the winter season, the Van Gujjars migrate with herds of semi-wild water buffalo to the Shivalik Hills at the foot of the Himalayas, and in summer, they migrate to alpine pastures higher up the Himalayas. The Gurjars sell milk to local peoples as their primary source of income. They treat their animals with great care and do not eat them nor sell them for meat.

The Van Gujjars have had conflicts with forest authorities, who prohibited human and livestock populations inside reserved parks. However, India's Forest Rights Act of 2006 granted rights to "traditional forest dwellers" to the lands they have relied on for generations. The conflict between local forest officials, who claim rights over the newly created parks, and the thousand year nomadic traditions of the Van Gujjars has been ongoing.

=== Pakistan ===
It has been estimated that Gujjars comprise 20% of Pakistan's total population.

In 1999, British anthropologist Stephen Lyon estimated their total population in Pakistan to number 30 million and theorized the notion of "Gujarism", the fact that Gujjars in Pakistan are conscious of their identity and often base their social activities, such as local political participation, on this basis, what he calls kin-network activism.

==== Punjab ====
Gujjars are mostly found in the country's Punjab province, where they gave their name to cities and towns such as Gujranwala, Gujar Khan and Gujrat, but for economics reasons recently they have emigrated to cities such as Karachi.

==== Khyber Pakhtunkhwa ====
Gujjars are also present in Khyber Pakhtunkhwa, where they're the third largest ethnic groups after the Pashtuns and the Awan, found in the Hazara region as well places like Dir, Swat, and Bajaur, often being conversant in Pashto, the provincial language.

In Swat, Pir Samiullah was a Gujjar community leader who was the first to raise a private tribal army against the Pakistani Taliban, with around 10,000 men, but was eventually defeated and executed by the Taliban in 2008, who then desecrated his dead body by hanging it publicly.

==== Azad Kashmir ====
In Azad Kashmir, they are one of the region's largest communities, by some estimates even being considered the single largest group with 800,000 individuals.

== See also ==
- Gurjaradesa
- Gurjaras of Mandavyapura
- Bhadanakas
- Muslim Gujjars
- Pratihar Gurjars
- List of Gurjar clans
- List of Gurjars
