= Bhadanaka Kingdom =

Indian medieval kingdom

- Capital: Shripath
- Spoken languages: Apabhramsa, Sanskrit
- Religion: Hinduism
- Today part of: India: Delhi; Haryana; Uttar Pradesh; Rajasthan

The Bhadanaka Kingdom was a medieval kingdom in India that included the Rewari, Bhiwani, Mahendragarh regions of Haryana and parts of Alwar in Rajasthan during the 11th and 12th centuries. The kingdom of the Bhadanakas was probably bounded on the south-east by the Kachchhapaghat land and the Chambal river, on the north-east by the kingdom of Kannauj and the Yamuna river.

== History and origin ==
=== Origin ===
Historian's including Dasharatha Sharma agree on an opinion that they were from Yadav caste.

=== Conflict with Chauhans ===
In the second half of the 12th century, the Bhadanakas had a political struggle with the Chauhans of Shakumbhari. Chauhan was inspired by the spirit of Digvijaya and wanted to build an empire in North India.

The Chauhans attacked Bhadanakas at least twice. We get to know about the first attack on Bhadanaka from the 'Bijolia inscription' of Chauhan king Someshwar of 1169 AD. There was a fierce battle between the Chauhans and the Bhadanakas, but this war could not prove to be decisive, although the Chauhans have claimed their victory in the Bijolia inscription.

== Territory ==
Scholar Siddhasain Suri has described the region of Bhadanaka country, situated between Kannauj and Harshapur (Haras in Shekhawati). He mentions Kamagga (Kaman, forty miles west of Mathura) and Siroha (near Gwalior) as sacred Jain sites of Bhadanaka country. Apart from these, Tejpal, the author of Apabhramsa Manuscript "Sambhavnath Charit", has described the city of Sripath situated in Bhadanaka country. According to historian Dasharatha Sharma, this city was the capital of this state. This town of Shripath (santipur) is identified with modern Bayana. According to 3 historians, Bhadanaka has been called Bhayanaya in the pre-medieval Apabhramsa language, and the word Bayana has originated in the post-medieval period from the word Bhayanaya. In this way, the modern earnest money was the focal point of the country. The strong fort of Tahangarh (Timangarh) is situated 14 miles south of Bayana, which was the defense cantonment of this state.

=== Language ===
The Apabhramsha is also called the Suraseni Apabhramsha, because the geographical area of the Bhadanaka Kingdom and the ancient Surasena region was almost the same. The Suraseni Apabhramsa is the mother of modern Brajbhasha.

== See also ==
- Ahir
- Apabhraṃśa
- Braj

== Bibliography ==
- Dasharatha Sharma (1959). Early Chauhān Dynasties. S. Chand / Motilal Banarsidass. ISBN 9780842606189.
- Iqtidar Alam Khan (2008). Historical Dictionary of Medieval India. Scarecrow Press. ISBN 9780810864016.
- R. B. Singh (1964). History of the Chāhamānas. N. Kishore. OCLC 11038728.
