= Asind =

Asind आसीन्द
- City
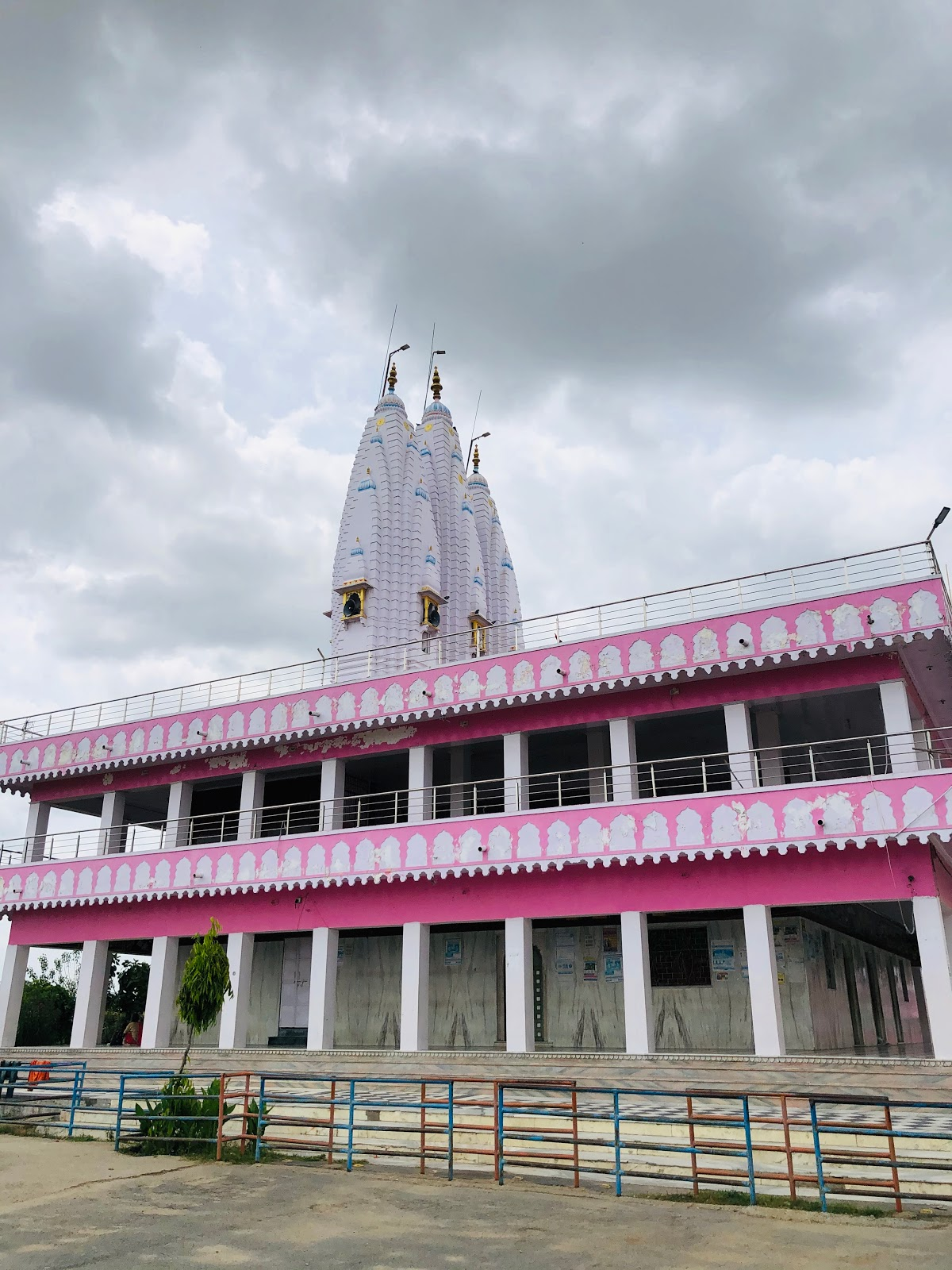
- Swaibhoj temple

- Location in Rajasthan, India Asind (India)
- Coordinates: 25.73°N 74.33°E
- Country: India
- State: Rajasthan
- District: Bhilwara

Government
  - Type: Municipal council (India)
  - Body: Asind Municipal Council
  - Chairman: Devi Lal Sahu (Bharatiya Janata Party)
- Elevation: 467 m (1,532 ft)

Population (2001)
  - Total: 24,370

Languages
  - Official: English and Hindi
- Time zone: IST +0530
- Postal code: 311301
- ISO 3166 code: RJ-IN
- Vehicle registration: RJ 06

Asind is a city and a municipality in Bhilwara district, Rajasthan, India. It is a Tehsil (sub-division) for many villages. The city has a magistrate office, lower justice court, and serves as an administrative hub for many major villages.

== Geography ==
Asind is located at 25.73°N 74.33°E. It has an average elevation of 467 metres (1532 feet).

== Demographics ==
As of 2001 India census, Asind had a population of 14,118. Males constitute 51% of the population and females 49%. Asind has an average literacy rate of 54%, lower than the national average of 59.5%; with 63% of the males and 37% of females literate. 18% of the population is under 6 years of age.

== Swaibhoj Temple ==
Swaibhoj Temple, also known as Shri Sawaibhoj Mandir, is a Hindu temple dedicated to Lord Devnarayan, revered as a folk deity by the Gurjar community.

== Notable people ==
- Jabbar Singh Sankhala
- V. P. Singh Badnore
