= Ganganagar Assembly constituency =

Constituency of the Rajasthan legislative assembly in India

Coordinates: 29.91°N 73.87°E

Ganganagar
- Constituency No. 2 for the Rajasthan Legislative Assembly

Constituency details
- Country: India
- Region: North India
- State: Rajasthan
- District: Sri Ganganagar district
- Lok Sabha constituency: Ganganagar
- Established: 1951
- Reservation: None

Member of Legislative Assembly
- 16th Rajasthan Legislative Assembly
- Incumbent Jaydeep Bihani
- Party: Bharatiya Janata Party
- Elected year: 2023

Ganganagar (also called Sri Ganganagar) Assembly constituency is one of the constituencies of Rajasthan Legislative Assembly, in India. It is a segment of Ganganagar Lok Sabha constituency.

Ganganagar constituency covers all voters from part of Ganganagar tehsil, which includes ILRC Ganganagar (including Ganganagar Municipal Council and excluding Chak Maharaj Ka), ILRC Burjwali and ILRC Natewala.

== Members of Legislative Assembly ==
Year	Member	Party
1951	Moti Ram	Indian National Congress
1957	Dev Nath	Indian National Congress
1962	Kedarnath	Independent
1967	Kedarnath	Samyukta Socialist Party
1972	Kedarnath	Socialist Party
1977	Kedarnath	Janata Party
1980	Radheshyam Ganganagar	Indian National Congress (I)
1985	Kedarnath	Janata Party
1990	Kedarnath	Janata Dal
1993	Radheshyam Ganganagar	Indian National Congress
1998	Radheshyam Ganganagar	Indian National Congress
2003	Surender Singh Rathore	Bharatiya Janata Party
2008	Radheshyam Ganganagar	Bharatiya Janata Party
2013	Kamini Jindal	National Unionist Zamindara Party
2018	Raj Kumar Gaur	Independent
2023	Jaydeep Bihani	Bharatiya Janata Party

== Election results ==
=== 2023 ===
2023 Rajasthan Legislative Assembly election: Ganganagar
Party	Candidate	Votes	%	±%
BJP	Jaydeep Bihani	81,001	44.66	▲27.16
Independent	Karuna Ashok Chandak	51,222	28.24	
INC	Ankur Maglani	39,006	21.5	▲0.39
AAP	Harish Raheja	1,987	1.1	
NOTA	None of the above	1,277	0.7	▲0.01
Majority		29,779	16.42	▲11.01
Turnout		181,386	75.84	▼1.22
BJP gain from Independent		Swing		

=== 2018 ===
Rajasthan Legislative Assembly Election, 2018: Ganganagar
Party	Candidate	Votes	%	±%
Independent	Raj Kumar Gaur	44,998	26.52	
INC	Ashok Chandak	35,818	21.11	
BJP	Vinita Ahuja	29,686	17.5	
Independent	Jaideep Bihani	29,206	17.22	
BSP	Prahalad Rai Tak	14,834	8.74	
NUZP	Kamini Jindal	4,887	2.88	
Independent	Radheshyam Ganganagar	2,318	1.37	
NOTA	None of the above	1,170	0.69	
Majority		9,180	5.41	
Turnout		169,653	77.06	
Independent gain from NUZP		Swing		

=== 2013 ===
- Kamini Jindal (NUZP) : 77,860 votes
- Radheshyam (BJP) : 40,792

=== 1993 ===
- Radheshyam Hardayal (INC) : 34,252 votes
- Surender Singh (JD) : 31,345 votes
- Bhairon Singh Shekhawat (BJP) : 26,378 votes (Sitting CM finished in third place, but he won from Bali)

=== 1951 ===
- Moti Ram (INC) : 17,215 votes
- Chet Ram (IND) : 9,880

== See also ==
- Member of the Legislative Assembly (India)
