= 14th Rajasthan Assembly =

- 14th Legislative Assembly of Rajasthan

Type
- Type: Unicameral
- Term limits: 5 years

History
- Preceded by: 13th Rajasthan Assembly
- Succeeded by: 15th Rajasthan Assembly

Leadership
- Speaker: Kailash Chandra Meghwal, BJP since 22 January 2014
- Deputy Speaker: Rao Rajendra Singh, BJP since 18 September 2015
- Leader of the House (Chief Minister): Vasundhara Raje Scindia, BJP since 13 December 2013
- Leader of the Opposition: Rameshwar Lal Dudi, INC since 23 January 2014

Structure
- Seats: 200
- Political groups: Government (161): BJP (160); NPP (1); Opposition (36): INC (25); BSP (2); NUZP (2); Independents (7); Vacant (3): Vacant (3)

Elections
- Voting system: First past the post
- Last election: 1 December 2013
- Next election: 7 December 2018

Meeting place
- Vidhan Bhavan, Jaipur, Rajasthan, India

Website
- http://rajassembly.nic.in/

The 14th Rajasthan Legislative Assembly was elected in 2013 Rajasthan Legislative Assembly election.

== History ==
=== Election ===
The results were declared on 8 December 2013. Chief Minister Ashok Gehlot won from his Sardarpura constituency by a margin of 18,478 votes while Vasundhara Raje won from Jhalarpatan by 60,896 votes. The election also recorded best and worst performances for the BJP and the Congress respectively in the state. Influential Meena leader and MP from Dausa, Kirori Lal Meena received a big setback when his newly formed party, National People's Party won only four seats.

Summary of the 1 December 2013 Rajasthan Legislative Assembly election results
Parties and coalitions	Popular vote			Seats			
Parties and coalitions	Votes	%	±pp	Contested	Won	+/−	%
Bharatiya Janata Party (BJP)	13,939,203	45.2	▲10.9	200	163	▲85	81.5
Indian National Congress (INC)	10,204,694	33.1	▼3.7	200	21	▼75	10.5
Independents (IND)	2,533,224	8.2	▼6.8	758	7	▼7	3.5
National People's Party (NPP)	1,312,402	4.3	▲4.3	134	4	▲4	2.0
Bahujan Samaj Party (BSP)	1,041,241	3.4	▼4.2	195	3	▼3	1.5
National Unionist Zamindara Party (NUZP)	312,653	1.0	▲1.0	25	2	▲2	1.0
Communist Party of India (Marxist) (CPM)	269,002	0.9	▼0.7	38	0	▼3	0.0
Samajwadi Party (SP)	118,911	0.4	▼0.4	56	0	▼1	0.0
Janata Dal (United) (JD(U))	59,673	0.2	▼0.3	15	0	▼1	0.0
Other parties and candidates	479,700	1.4	▼2.0	573	0	▼1	0.0
None of the Above (NOTA)	589,923	1.9	▲1.9				
Total	30,860,626	100.00		2194	200	±0	100.0
Valid votes	30,860,626	99.89					
Invalid votes	35,113	0.11					
Votes cast / turnout	30,895,739	75.67					
Abstentions	9,933,573	24.33					
Registered voters	40,829,312						
Source: Election Commission of India

=== Region-wise results ===
Region	Seats	Bharatiya Janata Party		Indian National Congress		Others
Marwad	46	40	▲21	5	▼15	1
Bagar	21	16	▲8	1	▼10	4
Harouti	57	43	▲17	8	▼11	6
Shekhawati	16	9	▲08	3	▼01	4
Mewar	60	55	▲36	4	▼34	1
Total	200	163	▲90	21	▼75	16

=== By-elections ===
- 2014 by-elections
- 2017 by-elections
- In the 2018 January by-elections Congress won Mandalgarh Assembly constituency that was previously held by BJP.

== Composition ==
Rajasthan legislative assembly in January 2016

In 2013
Party	Seats
Bharatiya Janata Party	160
National Peoples Party	1
Indian National Congress	25
Bahujan Samaj Party	2
National Unionist Zamindara Party	2
Independents	7
Vacant	3
Total Seats	200

== See also ==
- List of constituencies of Rajasthan Legislative Assembly
- Third Ashok Gehlot ministry
