= Jaydeep Bihani =

Indian politician

Member of 16th Rajasthan Assembly
- Incumbent
- Assumed office 15 December 2023
- Preceded by: Karuna Ashok Chandak
- Constituency: Ganganagar

Personal details
- Party: Bharatiya Janata Party
- Occupation: Politician

Jaydeep Bihani is an Indian politician serving as a member of the 16th Rajasthan Assembly. He is a member of the Bharatiya Janata Party and represents the Ganganagar Assembly constituency from Sri Ganganagar district.

== Political career ==
Following the 2023 Rajasthan Legislative Assembly election, he was elected as MLA from the Ganganagar assembly constituency, defeating Karuna Ashok Chandak (IND) by a margin of 29,779 votes.
