= 2014 Indian general election in Himachal Pradesh =

- 7 May 2014.

All 4 constituencies from Himachal Pradesh to the Lok Sabha
- Turnout: 64.45% (▲6.02%)

	Majority party	Minority party
Party	BJP	INC
Alliance	NDA	UPA
Last election	3 seats	1 seat
Seats won	4	0
Seat change	▲1	▼1
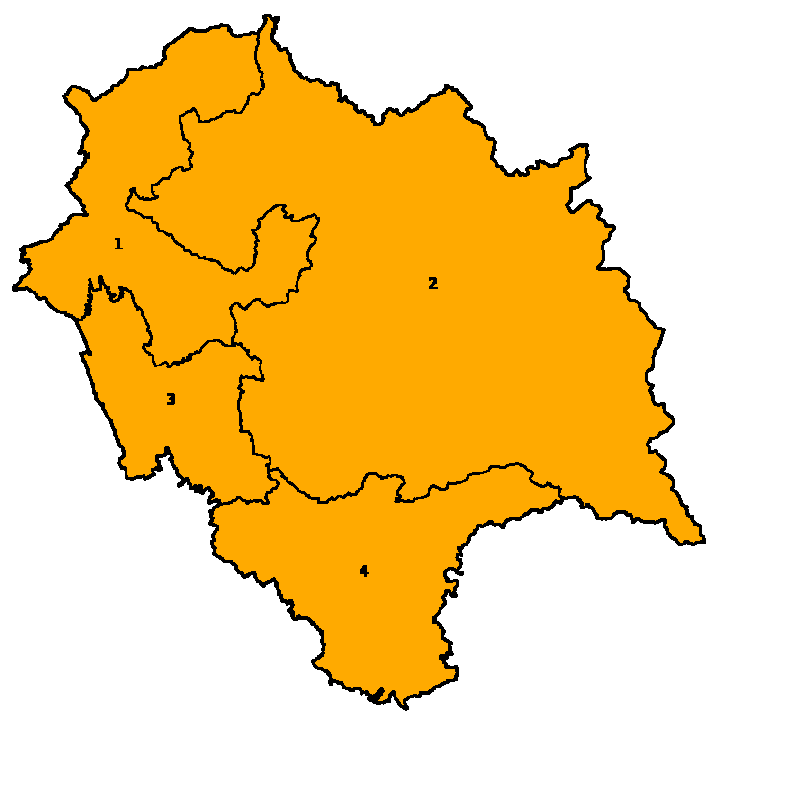
- Himachal Pradesh
Prime Minister before election
Manmohan Singh
INC
Prime Minister after election
Narendra Modi
BJP

The 2014 Indian general election in Himachal Pradesh were held for 4 seats in the state. The major two contenders in the state were Bharatiya Janta Party (BJP) and the Indian National Congress (INC). The voting process was held in a single phase on 7 May 2014.

== Parties and alliances ==
=== National Democratic Alliance ===
Party	Flag	Symbol	Leader	Seats contested
Bharatiya Janata Party			Prem Kumar Dhumal	4

=== United Progressive Alliance ===
Party	Flag	Symbol	Leader	Seats contested
Indian National Congress			Virbhadra Singh	4

== Result ==
Party Name	Popular vote			Seats		
Party Name	Votes	%	±pp	Contested	Won	+/−
BJP	16,52,995	53.35	▲3.77	4	4	▲1
INC	12,60,477	40.68	▼4.93	4	0	▼1
Others	1,27,366	4.11	Steady	19	0	Steady
IND	28,507	0.92	▼0.57	11	0	Steady
NOTA	29,155	0.94	New entry			
Total	30,98,500	100%	-	38	4	-

== List of elected MPs ==
Keys: BJP (4)

Constituency		Winner				Runner-up				Margin	
Constituency		Candidate	Party	Votes	%	Candidate	Party	Votes	%	Votes	%
1	Kangra	Shanta Kumar	BJP	456,163	57.03	Chander Kumar	INC	286,091	35.76	170,072	21.27
2	Mandi	Ram Swaroop Sharma	BJP	362,824	49.94	Pratibha Singh	INC	322,968	44.46	39,856	5.48
3	Hamirpur	Anurag Thakur	BJP	448,035	53.61	Rajinder Singh Rana	INC	349,632	41.83	98,403	11.78
4	Shimla	Virender Kashyap	BJP	385,973	52.30	Mohan Lal Brakta	INC	301,786	40.89	84,187	11.41

== Post-election Union Council of Ministers from Himachal Pradesh ==
#	Name	Constituency	Designation	Department	From	To	Party
1	Jagat Prakash Nadda	Himachal Pradesh (Rajya Sabha)	Cabinet Minister	Health & Family Welfare	9 November 2014	30 May 2019	BJP

== Assembly Segment wise lead ==
Party	Assembly segments	Position in Assembly (as of 2017 election)
Bharatiya Janata Party	59	44
Indian National Congress	9	21
Others	0	3
Total	68	
