= 2014 Indian general election in Rajasthan =

Indian general election, 2014 in Rajasthan
- 17, 24 April 2014.

All 25 Rajasthan seats in the Lok Sabha
- Turnout: 63.11% (▲14.70%)

	First party	Second party
Party	BJP	INC
Alliance	NDA	UPA
Last election	4	21
Seats won	25	0
Seat change	▲21	▼21
Popular vote	14,895,106	8,230,164
Percentage	55.61%	30.73%
Swing	▲19.57%	▼16.46%
- Seatwise Result Map of the 2014 general election in Rajasthan
Prime Minister before election
Manmohan Singh
INC
Prime Minister after election
Narendra Modi
BJP

The 2014 Indian general election in Rajasthan was held for 25 seats in the state. The BJP swept the state winning all the 25 seats and the Congress failed to win a single seat. The voting process was held in two phases on 17 and 24 April 2014.

== Parties and alliances ==
=== National Democratic Alliance ===
Party	Flag	Symbol	Leader	Seats contested
Bharatiya Janata Party			Ashok Parnami	25

=== United Progressive Alliance ===
Party	Flag	Symbol	Leader	Seats contested
Indian National Congress			C. P. Joshi	25

== List of Candidates ==
Constituency					
Constituency		NDA		UPA	
1	Ganganagar	BJP	Nihalchand	INC	Bhanwarlal Meghwal
2	Bikaner	BJP	Arjun Ram Meghwal	INC	Shankar Pannu
3	Churu	BJP	Rahul Kaswan	INC	Pratap Singh
4	Jhunjhunu	BJP	Santosh Ahlawat	INC	Raj Bala Ola
5	Sikar	BJP	Sumedhanand Saraswati	INC	Pratap Singh Jat
6	Jaipur Rural	BJP	Rajyavardhan Singh Rathore	INC	C. P. Joshi
7	Jaipur	BJP	Ramcharan Bohara	INC	Dr. Mahesh Joshi
8	Alwar	BJP	Mahant Chand Nath	INC	Bhanwar Jitendra Singh
9	Bharatpur	BJP	Bahadur Singh Koli	INC	Dr. Suresh Jatav
10	Karauli-Dholpur	BJP	Manoj Rajoria	INC	Lakkhiram
11	Dausa	BJP	Harish Chandra Meena	INC	Namo Narain Meena
12	Tonk-Sawai Madhopur	BJP	Sukhbir Singh Jaunapuria	INC	Mohammad Azharuddin
13	Ajmer	BJP	Sanwar Lal Jat	INC	Sachin Pilot
14	Nagaur	BJP	C R Choudhary	INC	Jyoti Mirdha
15	Pali	BJP	P P Choudhary	INC	Munni Devi Godara
16	Jodhpur	BJP	Gajendrasingh Shekhawat	INC	Chandresh Kumari Katoch
17	Barmer	BJP	Sonaram Choudhary	INC	Harish Chaudhary
18	Jalore	BJP	Devji Patel	INC	Udai Lal Anjana
19	Udaipur	BJP	Arjunlal Meena	INC	Raghuvir Singh
20	Banswara	BJP	Manshankar Ninama	INC	Resham Malviya
21	Chittorgarh	BJP	Chandraprakash Joshi	INC	Girija Vyas
22	Rajsamand	BJP	Hariom Singh Rathore	INC	Gopal Singh Shekhawat
23	Bhilwara	BJP	Subhash Baheria	INC	Ashok Chandna
24	Kota	BJP	Om Birla	INC	Ijyaraj Singh
25	Jhalawar-Baran	BJP	Dushyant Singh	INC	Pramod Jain Bhaya

== Result ==
Party Name	Popular vote			Seats		
Party Name	Votes	%	±pp	Contested	Won	+/−
BJP	1,48,95,106	54.94	▲18.37	25	25	▲21
INC	82,30,164	30.36	▼16.83	25	0	▼20
BSP	6,33,786	2.34	▼1.03	23	0	Steady
NPEP	3,25,334	1.20	New entry	4	0	Steady
AAP	2,72,641	1.01	New entry	22	0	Steady
Others	6,18,983	2.28	Steady	104	0	Steady
IND	18,06,700	6.66	▼2.65	117	0	▼1
NOTA	3,27,911	1.21	New entry			
Total	2,71,10,642	100%	-	320	25	-

== List of elected MPs ==
Keys: BJP (25)

Constituency		Winner				Runner-up				Margin	
Constituency		Candidate	Party	Votes	%	Candidate	Party	Votes	%	Votes	%
1	Ganganagar	Nihalchand	BJP	658,130	52.34	Master Bhanwarlal Meghwal	INC	366,389	29.14	291,741	23.20
2	Bikaner	Arjun Ram Meghwal	BJP	584,932	62.84	Er. Shankar Pannu	INC	276,853	29.74	308,079	33.10
3	Churu	Rahul Kaswan	BJP	595,756	52.63	Abhinesh Maharshi	BSP	301,017	26.59	294,739	26.04
4	Jhunjhunu	Santosh Ahlawat	BJP	488,182	48.40	Raj Bala Ola	INC	254,347	25.22	233,835	23.18
5	Sikar	Sumedhanand Saraswati	BJP	499,428	46.79	Pratap Singh Jat	INC	260,232	24.38	239,196	22.41
6	Jaipur Rural	Rajyavardhan Singh Rathore	BJP	632,930	62.28	Dr. C. P. Joshi	INC	300,034	29.52	332,896	32.76
7	Jaipur	Ramcharan Bohara	BJP	863,358	66.47	Dr. Mahesh Joshi	INC	324,013	24.94	539,345	41.53
8	Alwar	Chand Nath	BJP	642,278	60.42	Bhanwar Jitendra Singh	INC	358,383	33.71	283,895	26.71
9	Bharatpur	Bahadur Singh Koli	BJP	579,825	60.17	Dr. Suresh Jatav	INC	334,357	34.70	245,468	25.47
10	Karauli-Dholpur	Manoj Rajoriya	BJP	402,407	47.55	Lakkhiram	INC	375,191	44.33	27,216	3.22
11	Dausa	Harish Chandra Meena	BJP	315,059	33.84	Dr. Kirodi Lal	NPP	269,655	28.97	45,404	4.87
12	Tonk-Sawai Madhopur	Sukhbir Singh Jaunapuria	BJP	548,537	52.55	Mohammed Azharuddin	INC	413,031	39.57	135,506	12.98
13	Ajmer	Sanwar Lal Jat	BJP	637,874	55.14	Sachin Pilot	INC	465,891	40.27	171,983	14.87
14	Nagaur	C. R. Choudhary	BJP	414,791	41.25	Dr. Jyoti Mirdha	INC	339,573	33.77	75,218	7.48
15	Pali	P. P. Chaudhary	BJP	711,772	64.87	Munni Devi Godara	INC	312,733	28.50	399,039	36.37
16	Jodhpur	Gajendrasingh Shekhawat	BJP	713,515	66.08	Chandresh Kumari	INC	303,464	28.10	410,051	37.98
17	Barmer	Col. Sona Ram	BJP	488,747	40.09	Jaswant Singh	IND	401,286	32.91	87,461	7.18
18	Jalore	Devji Patel	BJP	580,508	53.35	Anjana Udai Lal	INC	199,363	18.32	381,145	35.03
19	Udaipur	Arjunlal Meena	BJP	660,373	55.32	Raghuvir Singh	INC	423,611	35.48	236,762	19.84
20	Banswara	Manshankar Ninama	BJP	577,433	49.29	Resham Malviya	INC	485,517	41.44	91,916	7.85
21	Chittorgarh	Chandra Prakash Joshi	BJP	703,236	59.95	Girija Vyas	INC	386,379	32.94	316,857	27.01
22	Rajsamand	Hariom Singh Rathore	BJP	644,794	65.59	Gopal Singh Shekhawat	INC	249,089	25.34	395,705	40.25
23	Bhilwara	Subhash Baheria	BJP	630,317	57.09	Ashok Chandna	INC	384,053	34.78	246,264	22.31
24	Kota	Om Birla	BJP	644,822	55.78	Ijyaraj Singh	INC	444,040	38.41	200,782	17.37
25	Jhalawar-Baran	Dushyant Singh	BJP	676,102	58.98	Pramod Bhaya	INC	394,556	34.42	281,546	24.56

=== Bye-elections ===
Constituency			Winner				Runner Up				Margin
No.	Name	Date	Candidate	Party	Votes	%	Candidate	Party	Votes	%	Margin
8	Alwar	1 Feb 2018	Karan Singh Yadav	INC	642,416	57.43	Jaswant Singh Yadav	BJP	445,920	40.07	196,496
8	Alwar	1 Feb 2018	The Alwar Lok Sabha bypoll was held following the death of the incumbent MP, Chand Nath.								
13	Ajmer	1 Feb 2018	Raghu Sharma	INC	611,514	50.64	Ramswaroop Lamba	BJP	527,100	43.65	84,414
13	Ajmer	1 Feb 2018	The Ajmer Lok Sabha bypoll was held following the death of the incumbent MP, Sanwar Lal Jat.								

== Post-election Union Council of Ministers from Rajasthan ==
#	Name	Constituency	Designation	Department	From	To	Party
1	Venkaiah Naidu	Rajya Sabha (Rajasthan)	Cabinet Minister	Urban Development; Housing and Urban Poverty Alleviation	5 July 2016	17 July 2017	BJP
1	Venkaiah Naidu	Rajya Sabha (Rajasthan)	Cabinet Minister	Information and Broadcasting	5 July 2016	17 July 2017	BJP
2	Rajyavardhan Singh Rathore	Jaipur Rural	MoS	Information and Broadcasting	9 November 2014	14 May 2018	BJP
2	Rajyavardhan Singh Rathore	Jaipur Rural	MoS (I/C)	Youth Affairs and Sports	3 September 2017	30 May 2019	BJP
2	Rajyavardhan Singh Rathore	Jaipur Rural	MoS	Information and Broadcasting	14 May 2018	30 May 2019	BJP
3	Vijay Goel	Rajya Sabha (Rajasthan)	MoS (I/C)	Youth Affairs and Sports	5 July 2016	3 September 2017	BJP
3	Vijay Goel	Rajya Sabha (Rajasthan)	MoS	Water Resources, River Development and Ganga Rejuvenation	5 July 2016	3 September 2017	BJP
3	Vijay Goel	Rajya Sabha (Rajasthan)	MoS	Parliamentary Affairs	3 September 2017	30 May 2019	BJP
3	Vijay Goel	Rajya Sabha (Rajasthan)	MoS	Statistics and Programme Implementation	3 September 2017	30 May 2019	BJP
4	Alphons Kannanthanam	Rajya Sabha (Rajasthan)	MoS (I/C)	Tourism	3 September 2017	30 May 2019	BJP
4	Alphons Kannanthanam	Rajya Sabha (Rajasthan)	MoS	Electronics and Information Technology	3 September 2017	14 May 2018	BJP
5	Arjun Ram Meghwal	Bikaner (SC)	MoS	Finance; Corporate Affairs	5 July 2016	3 September 2017	BJP
5	Arjun Ram Meghwal	Bikaner (SC)	MoS	Parliamentary Affairs	3 September 2017	30 May 2019	BJP
5	Arjun Ram Meghwal	Bikaner (SC)	MoS	Water Resources, River Development and Ganga Rejuvenation	3 September 2017	30 May 2019	BJP
6	P. P. Chaudhary	Pali	MoS	Law and Justice	5 July 2016	30 May 2019	BJP
6	P. P. Chaudhary	Pali	MoS	Electronics and Information Technology	5 July 2016	3 September 2017	BJP
6	P. P. Chaudhary	Pali	MoS	Corporate Affairs	3 September 2017	30 May 2019	BJP
7	C. R. Chaudhary	Nagaur	MoS	Consumer Affairs, Food and Public Distribution	5 July 2016	30 May 2019	BJP
7	C. R. Chaudhary	Nagaur	MoS	Commerce and Industry	3 September 2017	30 May 2019	BJP
8	Gajendra Singh Shekhawat	Jodhpur	MoS	Agriculture and Farmers' Welfare	3 September 2017	30 May 2019	BJP
9	Nihalchand	Ganganagar (SC)	MoS	Chemicals and Fertilizers	27 May 2014	9 November 2014	BJP
9	Nihalchand	Ganganagar (SC)	MoS	Panchayati Raj	9 November 2014	5 July 2016	BJP
10	Sanwar Lal Jat	Ajmer	MoS	Water Resources, River Development and Ganga Rejuvenation	9 November 2014	5 July 2016	BJP

- Note:
  - M. Venkaiah Naidu represented Karnataka in the Rajya Sabha until July 2016.
  - He was re-elected to the Rajya Sabha from Rajasthan on 5 July 2016 and served until his resignation on 17 July 2017 to run for Vice President

== Assembly Segment wise lead ==
Party	Assembly segments	Position in Assembly (as of 2018 election)
Bharatiya Janata Party	180	73
Indian National Congress	11	100
National People's Party	4	0
Others	5	27
Total	200	
