= 2014 Indian general election in Arunachal Pradesh =

- 9 April 2014

2 seats
- Turnout: 79.12% (▲10.95%)

	First party	Second party
Party	BJP	INC
Last election	0	2
Seats won	1	1
Seat change	▲1	▼1
Percentage	46.62%	41.66%
Swing	▲9.4%	▼9.55%
- Seatwise Result Map of the 2014 general election in Arunachal Pradesh
Prime Minister before election
Manmohan Singh
INC
Prime Minister after election
Narendra Modi
BJP

The 2014 Indian general election polls in Arunachal Pradesh for 2 Lok Sabha seats will be held in a single phase on 9 April 2014. The total voter strength of Arunachal Pradesh is 753,216.

The main political parties in Arunachal Pradesh are Indian National Congress (INC), Bharatiya Janata Party (BJP), All India Trinamool Congress (AITC), Nationalist Congress Party (NCP) and others.

== Election schedule ==
Constituency wise Election schedule are given below –

Polling Day	Phase	Date	Constituencies	Voting Percentage
1	2	9 April	Arunachal West, Arunachal East	71

== Parties and alliances ==
=== National Democratic Alliance ===
Party	Flag	Symbol	Leader	Seats contested
Bharatiya Janata Party			Kiren Rijiju	2

=== United Progressive Alliance ===
Party	Flag	Symbol	Leader	Seats contested
Indian National Congress			Nabam Tuki	2

== Opinion poll ==
Conducted in Month(s)	Ref	Polling Organisation/Agency		
Conducted in Month(s)	Ref	Polling Organisation/Agency	INC	BJP
Aug–Oct 2013		Times Now-India TV-CVoter	1	1
Jan–Feb 2014		Times Now-India TV-CVoter	1	1

== Result by party ==
Party Name	Popular vote			Seats		
Party Name	Votes	%	±pp	Contested	Won	+/−
BJP	2,75,344	46.12	▲8.95	2	1	▲1
INC	2,46,084	41.22	▼9.89	2	1	▼1
PPA	47,018	7.88	New entry	2	0	Steady
AITC	9,135	1.53	New entry	1	0	Steady
NCP	6,065	1.02	New entry	1	0	Steady
AAP	3,647	0.61	New entry	1	0	Steady
Others	980	0.16	Steady	1	0	Steady
IND	2,362	0.40	▼0.71	1	0	Steady
NOTA	6,321	1.06	Steady			
Total	5,96,956	100%	-	11	2	-

== Results Constituency wise ==
The results of the elections will be declared on 16 May 2014.

Constituency		Winner				Runner Up				Margin	%
#	Name	Candidate	Party	Votes	%	Candidate	Party	Votes	%	Margin	%
1	Arunachal West	Kiren Rijiju	BJP	169,367	50.16	Takam Sanjoy	INC	127,629	37.80	41,738	12.36
2	Arunachal East	Ninong Ering	INC	118,455	45.01	Tapir Gao	BJP	105,977	40.27	12,478	4.74

== Post-election Union Council of Ministers from Arunachal Pradesh ==
#	Name	Constituency	Designation	Department	From	To	Party
1	Kiren Rijiju	Arunachal West (Lok Sabha)	MoS	Home Affairs	27 May 2014	30 May 2019	BJP

== Assembly Segment wise lead ==
Party	Assembly segments	Position in Assembly (as of 2014 election)
Bharatiya Janata Party	35	11
Indian National Congress	22	42
People's Party of Arunachal	3	5
Others	0	2
Total	60	
