= 2014 Indian general election =

- 7 April 2014 – 12 May 2014

543 of the 545 seats in the Lok Sabha (Note: Two seats were reserved for Anglo-Indians and filled by presidential nomination) 272 seats needed for a majority
- Opinion polls
- Registered: 834,082,814
- Turnout: 66.44% (▲8.23pp)
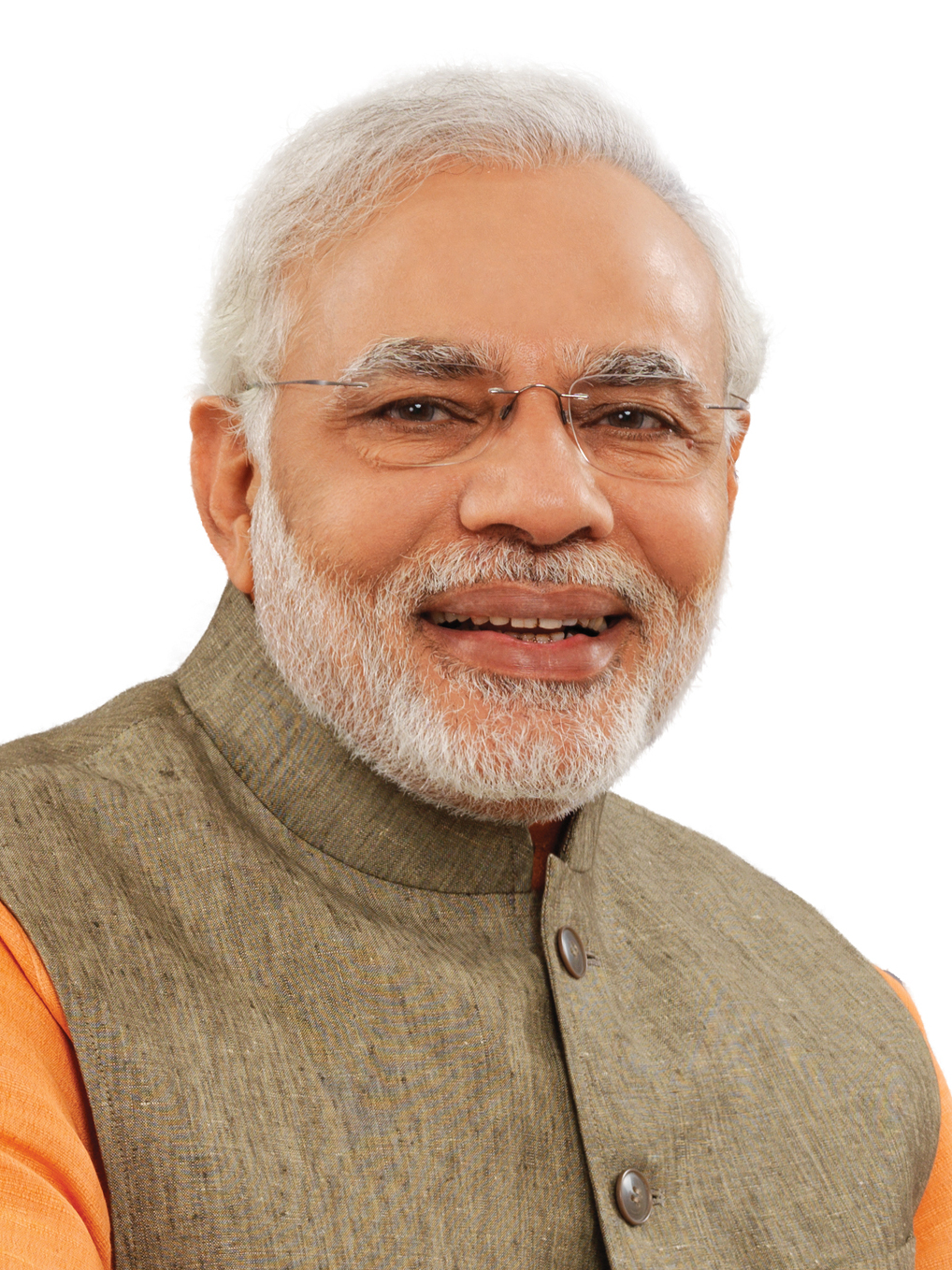

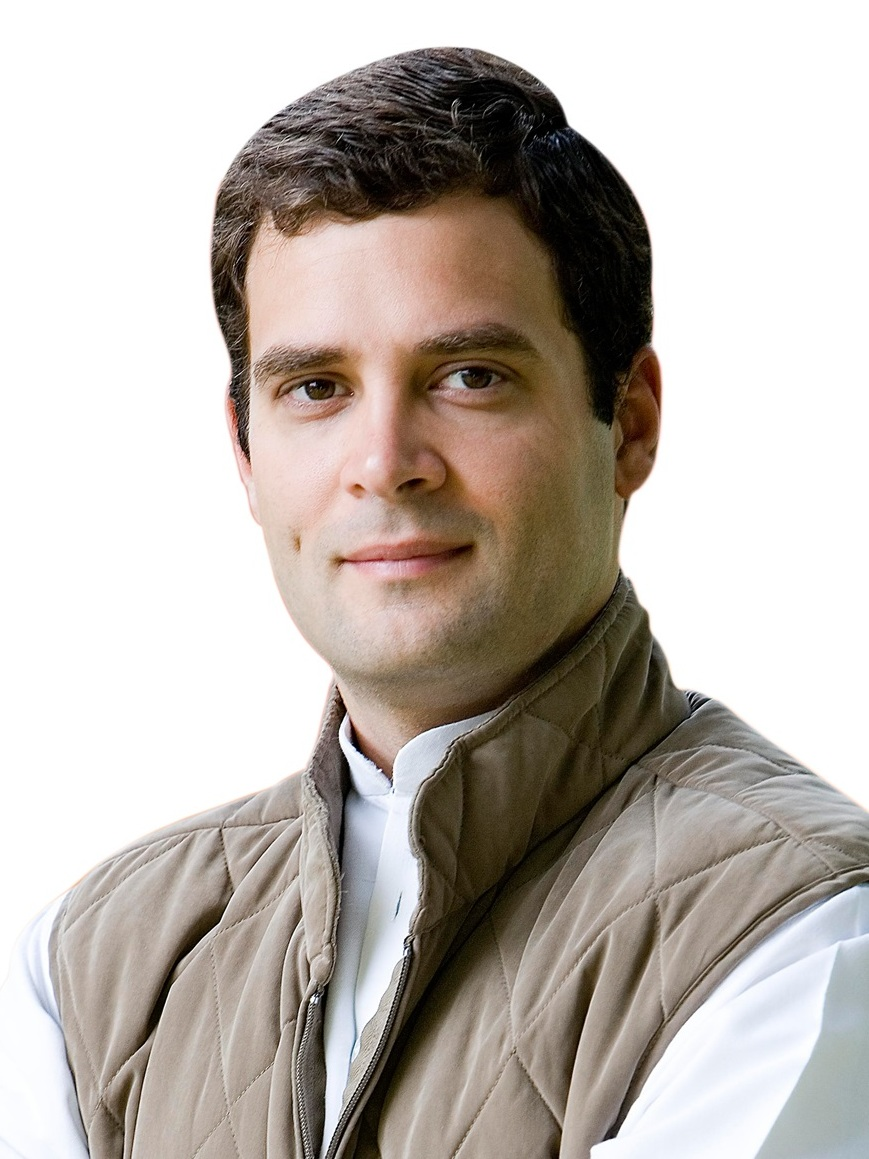
	First party	Second party
Leader	Narendra Modi	Rahul Gandhi
Party	BJP	INC
Alliance	NDA	UPA
Leader's seat	Vadodara (won; vacated); Varanasi (won; retained)	Amethi (won)
Last election	18.8%, 116 seats	28.55%, 206 seats
Seats won	282	44
Seat change	▲166	▼162
Popular vote	171,660,230	106,935,942
Percentage	31%	19.31%
Swing	▲12.2pp	▼9.24pp
Alliance seats	336	60
Seat change	▲178	▼202
Alliance percentage	38.5%	23%
Prime Minister before election
Manmohan Singh
INC
Prime Minister after election
Narendra Modi
BJP

General elections were held in India in nine phases from 7 April to 12 May 2014 to elect the members of the 16th Lok Sabha. With 834 million registered voters, they were the largest-ever elections in the world until being surpassed by the 2019 election. Around 23.1 million or 2.71% of the total eligible voters were aged 18–19 years. A total of 8,251 candidates contested the 543 elected Lok Sabha seats. The average election turnout over all nine phases was around 66.44%, the highest ever in the history of Indian general elections until the 2019 election.

The results were declared on 16 May, 15 days before the 15th Lok Sabha completed its constitutional mandate on 31 May 2014. The counting exercise was held at 989 counting centers. The Bharatiya Janata Party (BJP) received 31% of the vote and won 282 seats, while its National Democratic Alliance (NDA) won a total of 336 seats. Although the Indian National Congress (INC) was defeated by a landslide, the BJP's vote share was the lowest by a party winning a majority of seats since independence, The BJP won 31.2% votes, while NDA's combined vote share was 38.5%. However, the governing coalition had the largest majority since the 1984 elections, and it was the first time since 1984 that a party had won enough seats to govern without the support of other parties.

In contrast, the result was the worst-ever performance by the Indian National Congress (INC), which had ruled India for most of its post-independence history. The INC received 19.3% of the vote and won only 44 seats, with its wider alliance, the United Progressive Alliance, winning a total of just 59. In order to become the official opposition party in India, a party must have 55 seats; as a result, there was no official opposition party.

== Background ==
As per the requirements of the Indian Constitution, elections to the Lok Sabha must be held at an interval of five years or whenever parliament is dissolved by the president. The previous election, to the 15th Lok Sabha, was conducted in April–May 2009, and its term would have naturally expired on 31 May 2014. The election to the 16th Lok Sabha was organised and conducted by the Election Commission of India (ECI) and was held in multiple phases, to better handle the large electoral base and security concerns.

Since the last general election in 2009, Manmohan Singh led the second UPA government in his second consecutive term as Prime Minister, the anti-corruption movement by Anna Hazare, and other similar moves by Baba Ramdev and Arvind Kejriwal (founder of Aam Aadmi Party), gathered momentum and political interest. Kejriwal went on to form a separate political party, Aam Aadmi Party, in November 2012. The 2012 presidential election resulted in Pranab Mukherjee of Indian National Congress becoming the president. Andhra politics was further shaken following the death of its chief minister, Y. S. Rajasekhara Reddy. His son, Y. S. Jaganmohan Reddy, then broke from the INC and founded the YSR Congress Party, taking several politicians with him.

The final session of parliament started on 6 February and ended on 21 February. Amongst the agenda in the final session was passing The Lokpal and Lokayuktas Act, 2013 in tackling corruption and the creation of Telangana.

== Organisation ==
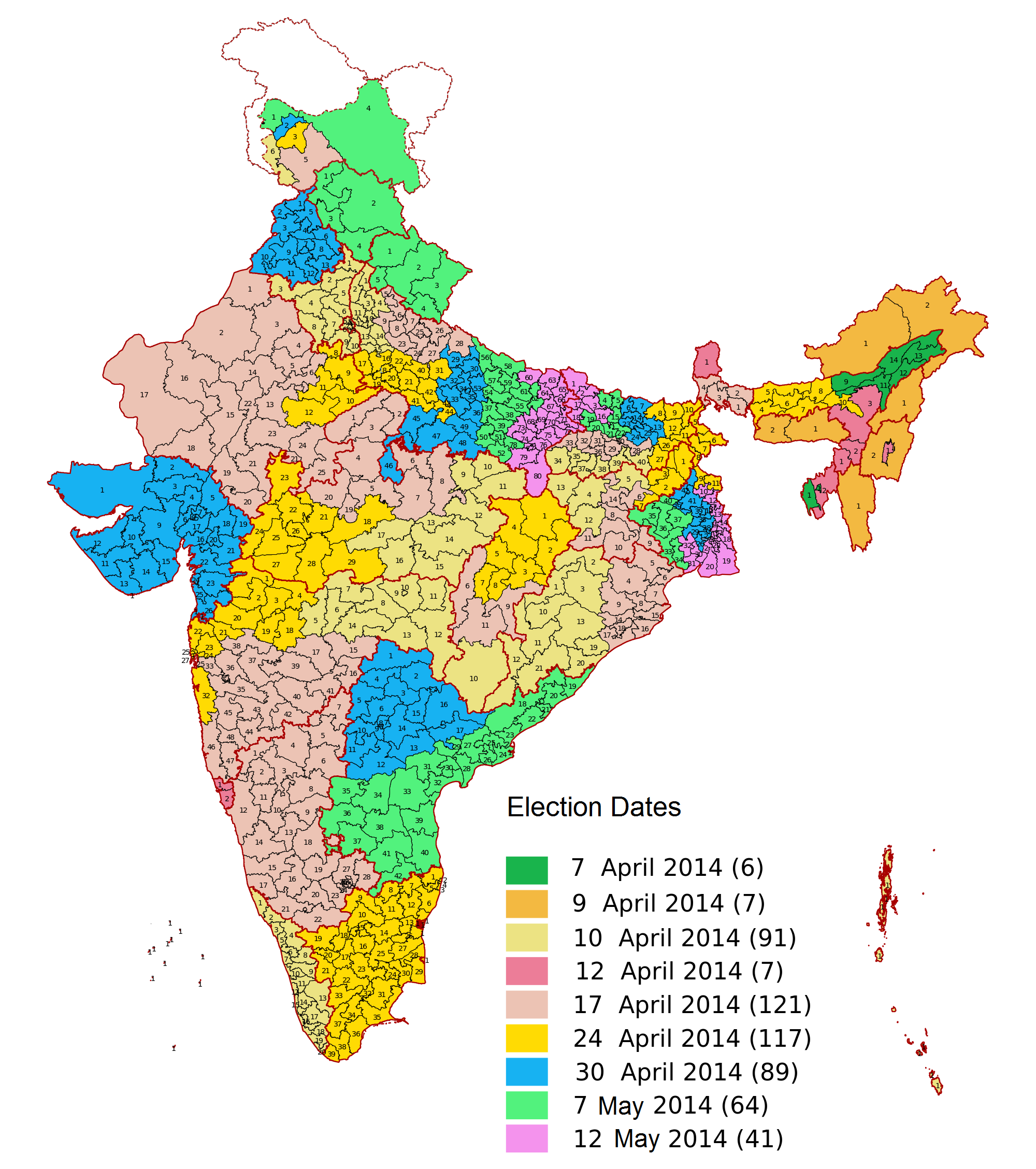
Dates of 2014 general election

=== Spending limit ===
The Cabinet of India revised the limit of election expenditure by a candidate for parliamentary constituencies to ₹7 million (US$75,000) in bigger states and to ₹5.4 million (US$58,000) in smaller states and all union territories except Delhi. This revision of the ceiling on the elections were attributed to the increase in the number of electors and polling stations as well as the increase in the cost inflation index.

=== Accessibility ===
Satyendra Singh, a doctor with a disability, showed the lack of preparedness by the Election Commission of India (ECI) towards electors with disabilities through the Right to Information Act. The Chief Electoral Officer in Delhi, Vijay Dev then started a campaign on providing accessibility for the disabled, along with him. Singh conducted sensitisation workshops for election officers and helped in setting up a registration link for voters with disabilities to register to vote and provide their requirements.

== Election schedule ==
The Chief Election Commissioner of India (CEC), V. S. Sampath, announced the polling schedule on 5 March. Voting was scheduled to be held in nine phases from 7 April to 12 May, and the results of the election were announced on 16 May. Simultaneous elections were held for the Vidhan Sabha of Andhra Pradesh, Arunachal Pradesh, Odisha, Telangana and Sikkim.

Phase-wise polling constituencies in each state
State/Union territory	Total constituencies	Election dates and number of constituencies								
State/Union territory	Total constituencies	Phase 1	Phase 2	Phase 3	Phase 4	Phase 5	Phase 6	Phase 7	Phase 8	Phase 9
State/Union territory	Total constituencies	7 April	9 April	10 April	12 April	17 April	24 April	30 April	7 May	12 May
Andhra Pradesh	25								25	
Arunachal Pradesh	2		2							
Assam	14	5			3		6			
Bihar	40			6		7	7	7	7	6
Chhattisgarh	11			1		3	7			
Goa	2					2				
Gujarat	26							26		
Haryana	10			10						
Himachal Pradesh	4								4	
Jammu and Kashmir	6			1		1	1	1	2	
Jharkhand	14			5		5	4			
Karnataka	28					28				
Kerala	20			20						
Madhya Pradesh	29			9		10	10			
Maharashtra	48			10		19	19			
Manipur	2		1			1				
Meghalaya	2		2							
Mizoram	1		1							
Nagaland	1		1							
Odisha	21			10		11				
Punjab	13							13		
Rajasthan	25					20	5			
Sikkim	1				1					
Tamil Nadu	39						39			
Telangana	17							17		
Tripura	2	1			1					
Uttar Pradesh	80			10		11	12	14	15	18
Uttarakhand	5								5	
West Bengal	42					4	6	9	6	17
Andaman and Nicobar Islands	1			1						
Chandigarh	1			1						
Dadra and Nagar Haveli	1							1		
Daman and Diu	1							1		
Delhi	7			7						
Lakshadweep	1			1						
Puducherry	1						1			
Constituencies	543	6	7	92	5	122	117	89	64	41
Total states/UTs polling on this day		2	5	14	3	13	12	9	7	3
Total constituencies by end of phase		6	13	105	110	232	349	438	502	543
% complete by end of phase		1%	2%	19%	20%	43%	64%	81%	92%	100%
			States/UTs		Constituencies					
Number of states and UTs polling in single phase			21		167					
Number of states and UTs polling in two phases			5		92					
Number of states and UTs polling in three phases			5		116					
Number of states and UTs polling in five phases			2		48					
Number of states and UTs polling in six phases			2		120					
Total			35		543					
Result			16 May 2014							

== Campaign ==
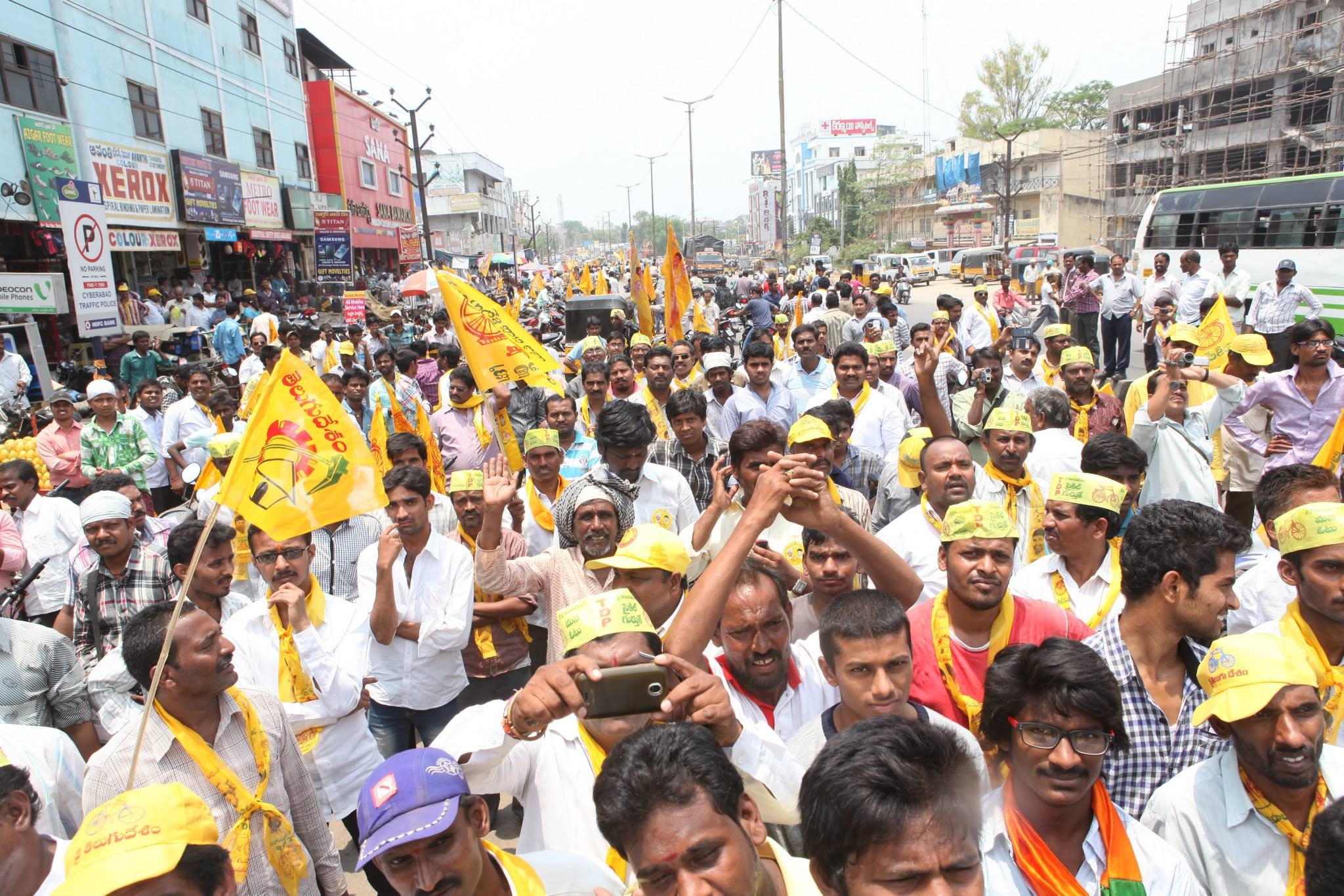
Supporters of Malla Reddy gather during the election campaign

=== Issues ===
Important issues during the campaign included high inflation, lack of jobs, economic slow down, corruption, security and terrorism, religious division and communalism, and infrastructure such as roads, electricity and water. In a survey by Zee News, inflation was indicated to be the main issue in the election.

==== Economy ====
Bloomberg highlighted India's slowing economy amidst a record high current account deficit and a falling rupee in summer 2013. It pointed out a lack of infrastructure investment and a government increasingly likely to give subsidies that the national finances cannot afford just before the election. Other points it mentioned were stagnant policymaking and an inefficient bureaucracy. The economy was the main issue in the campaign. The lack of a clear mandate as a result of the election could lead to an increase in the price of gold in the country. Modi also brought up the issue of farmer suicides that resulted from high debt and poor yield on their crops. Former Finance Minister Yashwant Sinha criticised the incumbent Chidambaram in saying that he had a "habit that he will get a strong economy, and he will ruin it before he leaves... Shri Chidambaram will be remembered in history as a spoiler, as someone who specialises in sub-five per cent growth rate, for his hubris, arrogance".

==== Price rise ====
The price of onions, a staple in Indian cuisine, faced a dramatic increase. In the lead up to the election, consumer price inflation increased more than expected while, paradoxically, industrial production fell by more than expected, causing a dilemma amid slowing growth. The price of salt was also indicative of general food inflation.

==== Corruption ====
During the UPA-2 government, a number of scams came to public attention, deteriorating the image of the government among the common man. These scams included coal scam, 2G spectrum case, AgustaWestland Chopper scam and CWG scam.

=== Celebrity candidates ===
Celebrity candidates from non-political spheres were nominated in the election. These included: Raj Babbar (INC), Bhaichung Bhutia (AITC), Biswajit Chatterjee (AITC), Sandhya Roy (AITC), Smriti Irani (BJP), Jaaved Jaaferi (AAP), Prakash Jha (JD(U)), Mohammad Kaif (INC), Kamaal Rashid Khan (SP), Vinod Khanna (BJP), Ravi Kishan (INC), Kirron Kher (BJP), Bappi Lahiri (BJP), Hema Malini (BJP), Mahesh Manjrekar (MNS), Bhagwant Mann (AAP), Nandan Nilekani (INC), Gul Panag (AAP), Jaya Prada (RLD), Rajyavardhan Singh Rathore (BJP), Paresh Rawal (BJP), Rakhi Sawant (RAP), Indranil Sen (AITC), Moon Moon Sen (AITC), Vijay Kumar Singh (BJP), Shatrughan Sinha (BJP), P. C. Sorcar Jr. (BJP), Babul Supriyo (BJP), Manoj Tiwari (BJP), Innocent Vincent (LDF-IND), Nagma (INC), Dev (AITC), and Siddhanta Mahapatra (BJD).

== Parties and alliances ==
=== National Democratic Alliance ===
The constituents of the National Democratic Alliance and the seats they contested and won are shown at the right in the table: The NDA garnered an overwhelming number of 336 seats in this election. This has propelled it to form the government in the country.

Party	Seats	
Party	Contested	Won
Bharatiya Janata Party	427	282
Telugu Desam Party	30	16
Shiv Sena	20	18
Desiya Murpokku Dravida Kazhagam	14	0
Shiromani Akali Dal	10	4
Pattali Makkal Katchi	8	1
Marumalarchi Dravida Munnetra Kazhagam	7	0
Lok Janshakti Party	7	6
Rashtriya Lok Samta Party	3	3
Apna Dal	2	2
Haryana Janhit Congress (BL)	2	0
Swabhimani Paksha	2	1
Indhiya Jananayaga Katchi	1	0
Puthiya Needhi Katchi	1	0
Kongunadu Makkal Desia Katchi	1	0
All India N.R. Congress	1	1
Republican Party of India (A)	1	0
Rashtriya Samaj Paksha	1	0
Revolutionary Socialist Party (Bolshevik)	1	0
Kerala Congress (Nationalist)	1	0
National People's Party	1	1
Naga People's Front	1	1
Mizo National Front	1	0
National Democratic Alliance	543	336

==== Bharatiya Janata Party ====
Organisation

Gujarat Chief Minister Narendra Modi was appointed to lead the Bharatiya Janata Party's campaign after a party conclave in Goa. This came amid controversy as L. K. Advani opposed the decision and resigned from his party posts, only to later rescind his resignation. Advani proposed Shivaraj Chouhan as prime ministerial candidate and compared him with Vajpayee. Murli Manohar Joshi and Sushma Swaraj were part of the team for the campaign. Rajnath Singh, Atal Bihari Vajpayee and Advani were the mentors for the BJP's campaign. A 12-member committee, led by Modi, was appointed at the Goa conclave which included M. Venkaiah Naidu, Nitin Gadkari, Madhya Pradesh Chief Minister Shivraj Singh Chouhan, Chhattisgarh Chief Minister Raman Singh and Goa Chief Minister Manohar Parrikar.

Key leader's constituencies

Modi contested the election from Varanasi in Uttar Pradesh and Vadodara in Gujarat. In Varanasi, the sizeable Muslim minority population was viewed by the media as an important voter target and the BJP's minority cell leader Salim Mohommad took part in campaigning. Advani wanted to contest from Bhopal but later agreed to contest again from his incumbent seat Gandhinagar. He also rejected a proposal to be appointed to the Rajya Sabha in favour of running in the election. Advani was given the Gandhinagar seat because Modi wanted him to contest from Gujarat, according to Rajnath Singh. Arun Jaitley contested for the Lok Sabha for the first time (having previously been a Rajya Sabha member) from Amritsar against former Punjab Chief Minister Captain Amarinder Singh. The move was controversial as incumbent MP from Amritsar Navjot Singh Sidhu was unhappy in not being allocated the constituency. Yet he said that as Jaitley was his "guru" he would accept the decision, but would not run from any other constituency. The reason for not allocating the ticket to Sidhu was said to be because of his spat with the Shiromani Akali Dal Punjab Chief Minister Parkash Singh Badal and party President Sukhbir Singh Badal, as well as other BJP personnel. Jaswant Singh was denied nomination from Barmer constituency so he decided instead to contest the seat as an independent.

Campaign and Issues

The BJP released its manifesto on 7 April 2014. The party promised to set up a Price Stabilisation Fund and to evolve a single 'National Agriculture Market' to check price rise and go for e-Governance, policy-driven governance and simplification of the tax regime to prevent corruption. It wanted to encourage labour-intensive manufacturing, focus on traditional employment bases of agriculture, the upgrade of infrastructure and housing and self-employment opportunities for job creation. Harnessing satellite technology; setting up National Optical-Fibre Network up to the village level; Diamond Quadrilateral project – of High Speed Train network were among several other things that the party promised. The Himachal Pradesh BJP attacked the UPA's "one rank, one pension" scheme as an "election stunt", according to the convenor of the BJP's ex-servicemen cell, Brigadier (Retired) Lal Chand Jaswal. The move followed the BJP raising the issue in the previous years and Modi's announcement at an ex-servicemen's rally at Rewari on 15 September 2013 and at Sujanpur on 17 February. Modi also criticised the INC and Rahul Gandhi for giving a ticket to former Maharashtra Chief Minister Ashok Chavan despite his indictment in the Adarsh Housing Society scam in Mumbai. He further criticised Gandhi's comments about his governance of Gujarat at rally in Bijapur. At a rally in Gurgaon, Haryana, part of the wider National Capital Region, Modi said: "People gave ruling Congress 60 years, I just need 60 months to prove that the BJP is the best option for India" and alleged that the INC was protecting Robert Vadra, the son-in-law of Sonia Gandhi, after he was said to have "sold farmers land" and made money. "Robert Vadra's empty bank account was credited with $8.30m (Rs 500 million) in just three months. BJP wants answers". He also criticised the INC's Nandan Nilekani as he had "squandered crores of rupees in giving a unique identity (Aadhaar) to millions of people, which even the Supreme Court questioned, as it did not address the security concerns."

Amongst the social media, individuals came up with satirical takes on sports, movies (in Hindi and English) and songs, amongst other things, in support of the BJP campaign slogan that were premised on "Aab ki baar, Modi sarkar" ([This time, [we will have a] Modi government]). Modi was noted for focusing, in his rallies across the country, on the 23 million first-time come-of-age voters. By the last day of campaigning on 10 May, Narendra Modi had undertaken the largest mass outreach in India's electoral history by travelling about 300,000 km for 437 public meetings in 25 states and 1350 innovative 3D rallies according to the BJP.

In regards to foreign relations of India, Modi, in a rally in Arunachal Pradesh, a state which borders China with a history of border disputes, swore to protect the country and criticised "Chinese expansionism." He also highlighted the importance of diplomats discussing issues like trade facilitation and promoting Indian business abroad.

==== Others ====
Lok Janshakti Party

Lok Janshakti Party leader Ram Vilas Paswan announced on 30 January that the LJP, RJD and INC will jointly contest the election from Bihar's constituencies. He later announced on 27 February that he will instead join the NDA. LJP contested polls with the BJP and Rashtriya Lok Samata Party (RLSP) on 40 seats with 30 seats for BJP, three seats for RLSP and seven seats for LJP. LJP and RLSP won all the seats allotted to them with BJP winning 22 seats. The election was seen by many BJP leaders as a show of strength after fallout with JD(U). After the election results, Nitish Kumar was forced to resign from the post of Chief Minister after being marginalised to just 2 seats.

Desiya Murpokku Dravida Kazhagam

Desiya Murpokku Dravida Kazhagam (DMDK), led by Tamil film actor Vijayakanth joined the NDA on 26 February.

Lok Satta Party

On 10 April, while campaigning in Telangana, Jayaprakash Narayan of the Lok Satta Party stated that while his party had a few differences of opinion with the BJP manifesto, they had decided to support the NDA in the "national interest". On the other hand, Dr. Jayaprakash Narayan contested from the Malkajgiri. Malkajgiri had 2,953,915 eligible voters in the election making it the largest parliamentary constituency of the country in terms of number of voters.

Shiv Sena, Swabhimani Paksha and Rashtriya Samaj Paksha

The Swabhimani Paksha (SWP) a political party of Swabhimani Shetkari Saghtana (SSS) joined the Shiv Sena-BJP-Republican Party of India (A) alliance in February. The SSS, which represents the interests of farmers in western Maharashtra was offered two seats – Madha in Solapur, where NCP leader Sharad Pawar sits, and Hathkanangale, the seat of SSS leader Raju Shetti. Shetti also sought Baramati but this was rejected by the Shiv Sena and BJP, who decided to leave a seat each from their quotas of 22 and 26 to accommodate SSS. Rashtriya Samaj Paksha also joined the alliance in January. In addition to the aforementioned four parties that were contesting from Maharashtra, RSP was also in the alliance.

Shiromani Akali Dal

Shiromani Akali Dal contested 10 out of 13 seats in Punjab.

=== United Progressive Alliance ===
The constituents of the United Progressive Alliance and the seats they contested and won are shown at the right in the table: This election turned out to be an unprecedented disaster for the UPA as they garnered the lowest number of seats in their history.

Party	Seats	
Party	Contested	Won
Indian National Congress	464	44
Rashtriya Janata Dal	28	4
Nationalist Congress Party	23	6
Rashtriya Lok Dal	8	0
Jharkhand Mukti Morcha	4	2
Jammu & Kashmir National Conference	3	0
Mahan Dal	3	0
Indian Union Muslim League	2	2
Socialist Janata	1	0
Kerala Congress (M)	1	1
Bodoland People's Front	1	0
United Progressive Alliance	538	59

In March, the INC, RJD and NCP announced that they would jointly contest in Bihar. The INC contested 12 seats, NCP fought on 1 seat and the RJD, being a regional party, would seek the rest of 27 seats.

==== Indian National Congress ====
The Indian National Congress had announced, on the fourth anniversary of the second United Progressive Alliance government, that its campaign for the election would be led by incumbent Prime Minister Manmohan Singh, INC chairperson Sonia Gandhi and general secretary Rahul Gandhi. Rahul Gandhi was appointed to head a six-member committee to formulate and implement alliances, the party manifesto and general publicity for the election.

In response to sagging opinion poll numbers for the general election, the INC sought to fast-track a decision on separating Telangana from Andhra Pradesh, create a coalition government with the Jharkhand Mukti Morcha and the Rashtriya Janata Dal in Jharkhand, sought to take credit for the Food Security Bill and passing Land Acquisition Bill.

Prime Minister candidate

Incumbent Prime Minister Manmohan Singh said that he would not return to his role should the INC get a majority or plurality. Rahul Gandhi told Dainik Bhaskar that he was "ready to take charge" of any responsibility the party gave him and he added that: "My focus for India is a long term vision, where all Indians are treated with equality, respect and are given equal opportunities." At the party meeting it was decided not to name a prime ministerial candidate amid fears it would turn the election into a presidential one. This was criticised by the BJP. Sonia Gandhi would instead lead the party's campaign. He also called the election a turning point. Sonia Gandhi then said that the party will face upcoming challenges and the election with a "lot of determination;" she added that the election would be a battle for India. "Divisive forces are stretching social fabric to breaking point. Opposition's way is to spread disharmony. There's a face hidden behind the mask of compassion."

Rahul Gandhi

In January, in an interview, Gandhi admitted that some Congress members may have been involved in the 1984 anti-Sikh riots and further stated that Modi's government was responsible for pushing the 2002 riots while the Congress government in 1984 tried to stop the anti Sikh riots. Praful Patel, a fellow UPA member said that the 2002 matter should be put to rest. As Gandhi was reported to have sought an early declaration of the party's candidates, the INC was scheduled to hold its first meeting of the central election committee on 13 February to finalise all their candidates by the end of the month. Similarly, the screening committees for several unnamed part of the country had already occurred so as to shortlist the candidates. On 8 March, its list of 194 candidates was announced, including 35% of candidates that were below the age of 50 years. The INC was reported to be concerned by the possibility of a reduced mandate in Gandhi's seat of Amethi (Lok Sabha constituency) amidst an unusual challenge by his high-profile competitor, the BJP's Smriti Irani. It even led to his mother, Sonia, campaigning there for the first time in 10 years.

Opinion polls

The INC dismissed the opinion polls pointing to a NDA plurality as misleading and partisan. In its manifesto the party promised "inclusive growth" and that it would initiate a raft of welfare schemes, including a right to healthcare for all and pensions for the aged and disabled. Manmohan Singh, Sonia and Rahul Gandhi's INC campaigning included scheduled stops in Odisha and, on 20 April, in Maharashtra prior to the third phase. Rahul Gandhi claimed in a rally in Chhattisgarh that Modi would "divide the nation into pieces, and make people fight against each other."

Media

During the election, former prime ministerial aide Sanjaya Baru published "The Accidental Prime Minister: The Making and Unmaking of Manmohan Singh" in which he criticised Singh as not being fully in charge of his government, and having to compete with the dynastic Congress leader, Sonia Gandhi, for influence within his own cabinet. Singh's office retorted in saying it is "smacks of fiction and coloured views of a former adviser." After Baru said "it is no secret that Sonia Gandhi was the super prime minister," Priyanka Gandhi replied "I think Manmohan Singh ji is the super PM."

==== Others ====
Jammu & Kashmir National Conference

Minister for New and Renewable Energy and Jammu & Kashmir National Conference chairman Farooq Abdullah, controversially, told a rally in Srinagar that in regards to Modi becoming prime minister "if it happens then Kashmir will not remain a part of India. I say it publicly. Kashmiris will not accept a communal person". He added before going to a scheduled rally in Magam that "those who vote for Modi should drown themselves in sea".

Nationalist Congress Party

Nationalist Congress Party (NCP) was in alliance with the INC in the states of Bihar, Goa, Gujarat, Jharkhand and Maharashtra.

Rashtriya Janata Dal

Rashtriya Janata Dal leader Lalu Prasad Yadav said of the BJP's ruling chances that "Modi and Advani can never become the prime minister in their lifetime. Secular forces in this country would never allow the saffron outfit to come to power". In relation to the INC's Rahul Gandhi he said that Gandhi wants to bring change to the country; he added in relation to Digvijay Singh that he was a "good man".

Jharkhand Mukti Morcha

Jharkhand Mukti Morcha (JMM) contested polls in alliance with INC and RJD in Jharkhand. JMM and INC contested in four and ten seats each, respectively. JMM leader Shibu Soren will run from Dumka, while the other three party's seats could come from Rajmahal, Giridih and the purpose-built city of Jamshedpur.

=== Left parties ===
Communist Party of India (Marxist) and Communist Party of India

The Communist Party of India (Marxist) declared their campaign slogan as "Reject Congress, Defeat BJP." On 3 April, the party published its fourth list of candidates for a total of 94 candidates.

In West Bengal, CPI (M) contested as part of the Left Front. 32 out of the 42 Left Front candidates in West Bengal came from the CPI (M), while 20 of its candidates were running for the first time. In Kerala, the CPI (M) contested as a constituent of the Left Democratic Front. In the list of the 15 CPI (M) candidates in Kerala released in mid-March, four were incumbent Lok Sabha members and five others were independents. The Kollam seat was allocated to M. A. Baby after the RSP left the LDF and joined the United Democratic Front.

In Assam, Haryana, Himachal Pradesh, Jharkhand, Karnataka, Odisha and Tamil Nadu, the CPI (M) made an electoral pact with the CPI and other left parties. In Andhra Pradesh, however, no agreement could be reached between the CPI (M) and the CPI due to differences on the Telangana issue; CPI (M) opposed bifurcation, while the CPI supported creating Telangana. In Telangana region, CPI contested one seat (in alliance with Indian National Congress), while CPI (M) contested two seats.

=== Other parties ===
Aam Aadmi Party

The Aam Aadmi Party (AAP), formed in 2012, contested 432 seats and won 4 seats. The party's manifesto focused on anti-corruption measures. Earlier in 2013, the party had made an impressive electoral debut by winning the second highest number of seats in the Delhi Legislative Assembly elections. After forming a short-lived minority government in Delhi, AAP was seen as a major challenger to the other political parties. However, the party lost deposits on 413 seats, surpassing the record of Doordarshi Party, which had lost deposit on 321 seats in 1991. AAP's leader Arvind Kejriwal unsuccessfully contested against the BJP's prime ministerial candidate Narendra Modi from Varanasi. Its spokesperson Prashant Bhushan argued that AAP's national debut performance was better than that of the winning party BJP in its first national elections in 1984.

All India Anna Dravida Munnetra Kazhagam

The All India Anna Dravida Munnetra Kazhagam (AIADMK) opted not to join any alliance and contested all seats in the state of Tamil Nadu and the union territory of Puducherry on its own. Party General Secretary J. Jayalalithaa told a March rally that she would modernise the armed forces by enhancing their capabilities so that they were on par with the superpowers. In saying so, she criticised the UPA's governance, including its economic, diplomatic, and defence policies, adding that the modernisation of the armed forces was hindered by the steady curtailment of its funding. The party won an unprecedented 37 out of the 40 parliamentary constituencies it contested and emerged as the third-largest party in the 16th Lok Sabha of the Indian Parliament. It was a massive victory that no other regional political party had ever achieved in the history of general elections.

All India Forward Bloc

On 21 March, the All India Forward Bloc released its first list of candidates that covered 38 seats in West Bengal, Maharashtra, Assam, Uttar Pradesh, Bihar, Haryana, Jharkhand, Andaman and Nicobar Islands, Odisha, Rajasthan, Karnataka and Delhi. According to the party's Secretary Debabrata Biswas the main objective of the party was "to strengthen and unite the Left, democratic and secular forces to achieve an alternative policy for reconstruction of the country." In West Bengal the party contested the election as part of the Left Front. To defend the two West Bengal seats that it won in 2009, the party decided to field incumbent MP Narahari Mahato in the Purulia seat and a new candidate in the Cooch Behar seat.

Bahujan Samaj Party

On 19 March, Bahujan Samaj Party (BSP) leader Mayawati declared that the party would contest the election on its own and fielded candidates in all 80 seats in Uttar Pradesh. Mayawati was confident that the BSP would seek a mandate to form a government with support of secular parties. The party secured the third highest vote share in the Country and yet did not win a single seat.

Communist Party of India (Marxist–Leninist) Liberation

At a press conference held on 10 March, General Secretary of the party Dipankar Bhattacharya said his party would field 85 candidates in Bihar, Uttar Pradesh, West Bengal, Tamil Nadu, Karnataka, Rajasthan, Punjab, Jharkhand and Puducherry.

Dravida Munnetra Kazhagam

Dravida Munnetra Kazhagam (DMK) opted not to join an UPA pre-poll alliance and contested all seats in Tamil Nadu with its own regional alliance. Party leader Karunanidhi announced Democratic Progressive Alliance (DPA) with local parties like VCK, MMK, IUML and Puthiya Tamizhagam. DMK was not able to secure even a single seat throughout the country.

Janata Dal (United)

The media speculated that Modi still had a chance of gaining in Bihar at the expense of Nitish Kumar's Janata Dal. Whilst the BJP were in coalition with JD(U), Modi was not allowed to speak at rallies in the party by mutual understanding and was only allowed for special events such as a funeral or party conclave, even Modi's flood relief aid to Bihar was termed communal. Bihar was seen as test case for Modi's popularity if the BJP could increase its tally at the expense of the JD(U). There was also speculation that Lalu Prasad Yadav could make a relative comeback after the 2010 provincial election if he is not convicted over the fodder scam. It also suggested that this would be an eager race as it could determine if Kumar's decision to leave the NDA in June 2013 was prudent and if he has any national political scope left; while for Modi it would give crucial seats to the BJP and be able to attract potential allies as Bihar is largely based on caste politics. In January 2014, Kumar referred to Gandhi's stand against corruption as a "farce" after hearing of a meeting between Gandhi and RJD chief Lalu Prasad Yadav despite Yadav being out on bail, after being convicted in the fodder scam. He termed their alliance as "natural" and stated that them coming together was no surprise.

All India Majlis-e-Ittehadul Muslimeen

Asaduddin Owaisi announced 5 candidates from the All India Majlis-e-Ittehad-ul-Muslimeen (AIMIM) participated in various parliamentary constituencies of Telangana State. Asaduddin Owaisi - Hyderabad Narla Mohan Rao - Secunderabad Divakar Dharanikota Sudhakar - Malkajgiri P.V.N. Reddy - Nandyal, Andhra Pradesh (from 2014 onwards) Guahati Mothilal - Bhongir

Maharashtra Navnirman Sena

The Raj Thackeray-led Maharashtra Navnirman Sena (MNS) announced its first list of seven candidates. Six of them contested against candidates of Shiv Sena. The party, however, also supported Modi's prime ministerial candidature. The move read as an implicit acceptance of the BJP's Nitin Gadkari's call not to contest against the NDA and to support its own candidates.

Nav Bharat Democratic Party

Nav Bharat Democratic stepped into the political arena with 9 candidates spread across Uttar Pradesh and Punjab. The party was established by RK Misra.

Samajwadi Party

Samajwadi Party president Mulayam Singh Yadav claimed that the Third Front government will be formed in the center with the help of his party. To counter the "Modi-effect" on other constituencies near Varanasi, Yadav decided to contest from Azamgarh and Mainpuri. The party decided not to field any candidates against the INC's Sonia Gandhi and Rahul Gandhi from Rai Bariely and Amethi, respectively, in response to the INC's decision not to field any candidates against Mulayam Singh Yadav and Dimple Yadav from Mainpuri and Kannauj, respectively.

Sikkim Democratic Front

On 10 March, the Sikkim Democratic Front declared that its incumbent MP, Prem Das Rai, would run for re-election. The party also released a list of 32 candidates for the 2014 Sikkim Legislative Assembly election that will be held simultaneously with the election.

All India Trinamool Congress

All India Trinamool Congress leader Mamata Banerjee declared that the party would contest all 42 seats in West Bengal by itself, making this the first occurrence of the party contesting a general election in West Bengal without an alliance with either of the two largest parties, BJP and INC. Banerjee told a rally in Cooch Behar district, near the international border with Bangladesh, that she would take up the issue of the border enclaves upon ascertaining the views of the local people living in the adversely possessed areas. She further noted that she had opposed the central government's agreement in 2011 over the Teesta treaty of water-sharing between the two countries on the grounds of receding waters affecting drinking water availability.

YSR Congress Party

Y. S. Jaganmohan Reddy's YSR Congress Party fielded candidates across Andhra Pradesh (Rayalaseema & Coastal Andhra) and some districts of Telangana. The party fielded several bureaucrats, businessmen and relatives of politicians for Lok Sabha seats in Andhra Pradesh (Rayalaseema & Coastal Andhra), including D. Kishore Rao, the former secretary of the Gujarat Human Rights Commission. In a statement in March, Reddy stated that he would ally himself with whoever would win the election.

== Surveys and polls ==
=== Opinion polls ===
Opinion polls generally showed the National Democratic Alliance (NDA) to be the front runner in the election with the emergence of Bharatiya Janata Party (BJP) as the single largest party.

When conducted	Ref	Polling organisation/agency	Sample size				
When conducted	Ref	Polling organisation/agency	Sample size	UPA	NDA	LF	Other
Jan–Mar 2013		Times Now-CVoter	No sample size provided	128	184	–	–
Apr–May 2013		Headlines Today-CVoter	120,000	209 (without Modi); 155(with Modi)	179(without Modi); 220 (with Modi)	–	–
May 2013		ABP News-Nielsen	33,408	136	206	–	–
Jul 2013		The Week – Hansa Research	No sample size provided	184	197	–	162
Jul 2013		CNN-IBN and The Hindu by CSDS	19,062	149–157	172–180	–	208–224
Jul 2013		Times Now-India Today-CVoter	36,914	134 (INC 119)	156 (BJP 131)	–	–
Aug–Oct 2013		Times Now-India TV-CVoter	24,284	117 (INC 102)	186 (BJP 162)	–	240
Dec 2013 – Jan 2014		India Today-CVoter	21,792	103 (INC 91)	212 (BJP 188)	–	228
Dec 2013 – Jan 2014		ABP News-Nielsen	64,006	101 (INC 81)	226 (BJP 210)	–	216
Jan 2014		CNN-IBN-Lokniti-CSDS	18,591	107 – 127 (INC 92 – 108)	211 – 231 (BJP 192 – 210)	–	205
Jan–Feb 2014		Times Now-India TV-CVoter	14,000	101 (INC 89)	227 (BJP 202)	–	215
Feb 2014		ABP News-Nielsen	29,000	92	236	29	186
Feb 2014		CNN-IBN-Lokniti-CSDS	29,000	119 – 139 (INC 94 – 110)	212 – 232 (BJP 193 – 213)	105–193	
March 2014		NDTV- Hansa Research	46,571	128	230	55	130
March 2014		CNN-IBN-Lokniti-CSDS	20,957	111–123	234–246	174–198	
April 2014		NDTV- Hansa Research	24,000	111 (INC 92)	275 (BJP 226)	157	

=== Exit polls ===
The Election Commission of India banned the publication of all exit polls starting 48 hours before Phase 1 of the election until the end of Phase 9. This was intended to prevent exit polls from earlier phases affecting voter decisions in later phases. The ban ended after the close of Phase 9 voting at 6:30pm IST on 12 May 2014.

When conducted	Ref	Polling organisation/agency	Constituencies polled				
When conducted	Ref	Polling organisation/agency	Constituencies polled	UPA	NDA	LF	Other
April/May 2014 (post-poll)		CNN-IBN-Lokniti-CSDS	287	92–102 (INC 72–82)	270–282 (BJP 230–242)	125–171	
April/May 2014 (exit+post-poll)		India Today – Cicero	543	110–120	261–283	150–162	
April/May 2014 (exit+post-poll)		News 24-Today's Chanakya	479	61–79 (INC 48–66)	326–354 (BJP 277–305)	122–144	

Publish Date	Ref	Polling Organisation			
Publish Date	Ref	Polling Organisation	NDA	UPA	Other
12 May 2014		CNN-IBN – CSDS – Lokniti	276	97	148
12 May 2014		India Today – Cicero	272	115	156
12 May 2014		News 24 – Chanakya	340	70	133
12 May 2014		Times Now – ORG	249	148	146
12 May 2014		ABP News – Nielsen	274	97	165
12 May 2014		India TV – CVoter	289	101	148
14 May 2014		NDTV – Hansa Research	279	103	161
14 May 2014		CNN-IBN – CSDS	280	97	148
12 May 2014		Poll of Polls	283	105	149

== Controversies ==
During the course of the campaign, several controversies arose with parties being accused by one another and the Election Commission of India (ECI) of violating Election Commission of India's Model Code of Conduct that is in force during the election. The ECI was itself criticised for bias practices when it raided the BJP's Varanasi office, where Narendra Modi was the BJP candidate.

In the run-up to the election, the media in India was criticised for its establishment ties between family owners and political parties. It caused self-censorship and editorial dismissals at certain media outlets.

India Today temporarily suspended its CVoter opinion poll in late February after a News Express sting operation suggesting Polling Agencies like Ipsos and CVoter fudged the numbers to show BJP candidate Narendra Modi in the lead.

== Voting ==
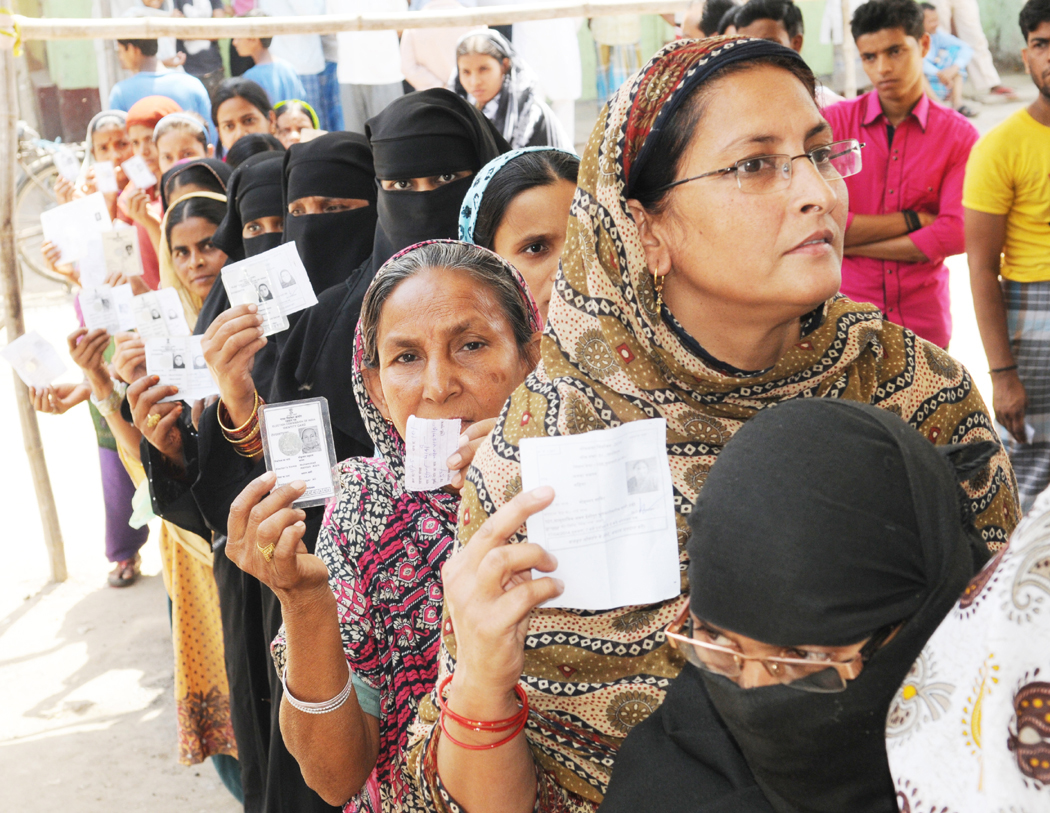
Women queue to vote in Patna City, Bihar

In total there were 1.4 million electronic voting machines in 930,000 voting centres. The voter-verified paper audit trail (VVPAT) system which enables EVM to record each vote cast by generating the EVM slip, was introduced in 8 constituencies of Lucknow, Gandhinagar, Bangalore South, Chennai Central, Jadavpur, Raipur, Patna Sahib and Mizoram as a pilot project. Also, Braille ballot sheets for the blind were arranged at polling stations. The scale of the election required 1.1 million of civil servants and 5.5 million civilian employees to handle the election. It was the first election that had the "none of the above" option and allowed Non-Resident Indians to vote; though only in India. Security was increased during the election, particularly as the Communist Party of India (Maoist) (CPI (Maoist)) called for a boycott of the election. On 12 April, even though there was no voting this day, a vehicle in Chhattisgarh hit a CPI (Maoist) landmine resulting in the deaths of two bus drivers and five election officials, with four more injured, while travelling from Kutru to Bijapur in preparation for the fifth phase of voting. On the same day, within an hour, they also ambushed a vehicle resulting in the deaths of five paramilitary soldiers in the Darbha forest. The election was the longest and the most expensive general election in the history of the country, with the Election Commission of India estimating that the election did cost the exchequer ₹ 3500 crore (US$577 million), excluding the expenses incurred for security and by the individual political parties. Parties were expected to spend ₹ 30,500 crore (US$5 billion) in the election, according to the Centre for Media Studies. This was three times the amount spent in the previous election in 2009, and was then the world's second highest after the US$7 billion spent on the 2012 US presidential election.

The election reportedly boosted the hospitality sector as, according to ASSOCHAM, tourist arrivals from the countries such as the US, UK, France, Singapore and the U.A.E. have gone up by 10–15 per cent, while the movement of domestic tourists jumped by 62%.

=== Turnout ===
Based on data from Election Commission India

State/UT	Total Electors	Total Voters	Total Turnout	Total seats
Andaman & Nicobar Islands (UT)	269,360	190,328	70.66%	1
Andhra Pradesh	64,938,750	48,358,545	74.47%	42
Arunachal Pradesh	759,387	596,956	78.61%	2
Assam	18,885,274	15,085,883	79.88%	14
Bihar	63,761,796	35,885,366	56.28%	40
Chandigarh (UT)	615,214	453,455	73.71%	1
Chhattisgarh	17,623,049	12,255,579	69.54%	11
Dadra & Nagar Haveli (UT)	196,617	165,286	84.06%	1
Daman & Diu (UT)	111,827	87,233	78.01%	1
Goa	1,060,777	817,000	77.02%	2
Gujarat	40,603,104	25,824,003	63.60%	26
Haryana	16,097,749	11,495,150	71.41%	10
Himachal Pradesh	4,810,071	3,098,501	64.42%	4
Jammu & Kashmir	7,202,163	3,566,863	49.52%	6
Jharkhand	20,326,743	12,982,940	63.87%	14
Karnataka	46,212,109	31,038,888	67.17%	28
Kerala	24,326,649	17,975,893	73.89%	20
Lakshadweep (UT)	49,922	43,239	86.61%	1
Madhya Pradesh	48,118,040	29,639,796	61.60%	29
Maharashtra	80,717,283	48,718,844	60.36%	48
Manipur	1,774,325	1,412,637	79.62%	2
Meghalaya	1,567,241	1,078,058	68.79%	2
Mizoram	702,170	433,201	61.69%	1
Nagaland	1,182,948	1,038,910	87.82%	1
NCT OF Delhi	12,711,236	8,271,766	65.07%	7
Orissa	29,196,041	21,532,275	73.75%	21
Puducherry (UT)	901,357	740,017	82.10%	1
Punjab	19,608,008	13,845,132	70.61%	13
Rajasthan	42,969,447	27,110,044	63.09%	25
Sikkim	370,611	308,967	83.37%	1
Tamil Nadu	55,114,505	40,620,440	73.70%	39
Tripura	2,388,819	2,023,859	84.72%	2
Uttar Pradesh	138,965,820	81,092,302	58.35%	80
Uttarakhand	7,129,939	4,391,890	61.66%	5
West Bengal	62,833,128	51,622,555	82.16%	42
India	834,082,814	554,175,255	66.44%	543

- Phase 1: 7 April

Turnout was 75% in Assam and 84% in Tripura. Assam's INC Chief Minister Tarun Gogoi said that "there is no Narendra Modi magic in Assam. The Congress has been winning every form of elections since 2001 in Assam, and we are going to repeat the performance this time." Additionally, the borders with Bangladesh and Bhutan were closed for security reasons.

- Phase 2: 9 and 11 April

The turnouts were recorded at 82.5% in Nagaland, 71% in Arunachal Pradesh, 66% in Meghalaya and 70% in Manipur. Mizoram's voting was deferred to 11 April, where the turnout was 60%.

- Phase 3: 10 April

About 110 million of people were eligible to vote for 91 seats. The turnout was 76% in Kerala, 64% in Delhi, 55.98% in Madhya Pradesh, 54.13% in Maharashtra, 65% in Uttar Pradesh and 66.29% in Jammu. Kerala and Chandigarh set new voter turnout records. A higher proportion of eligible electors voted in 2014 than in 2009.

- Phase 4: 12 April

Voter turnout set new records or were near record levels with 75% in Goa, 75% in Assam, 81.8% in Tripura and 80.97% in Sikkim (including the 2014 Sikkim Legislative Assembly election). West Bengal Chief Minister Mamata Banerjee nearly cancelled the polls in her region after initially refusing to changes to the appointments of civil service departments, but was forced to constitutionally do so.

- Phase 5: 17 April

The largest voting day involved nearly 200 million eligible voters, 1,769 candidates for 121 seat. The voting turnout in Uttar Pradesh was 62%, West Bengal was 80%, over 70% in Odisha, 69% in Jammu and Kashmir, 54% in Madhya Pradesh and 62% in Jharkhand. Manipur had 74% and Maharashtra had a 61.7% turnout. In Karnataka, the average voting was up on 65% against 58% in the previous election, though urban voters were lower. In Chhattisgarh, the voter turnout was 63.44% compared to 57.6% in 2009, while Rajasthan recorded a 63.25% voter turnout, compared to 48.09% in 2009. In Bihar's seven constituencies, the turnout was 56%, compared to 39% in 2009. In one of six constituencies from Jammu and Kashmir, Udhampur, the turnout of 70% was significantly higher than the 2009 figure of 45%. Overall across India, the turnout on the day was over 65% and nearly all constituencies had a higher voter turnout than 2009.

- Phase 6: 24 April

The second largest voting day entailed 180 million eligible voters across 201,735 voting centres to elect 117 members of parliament from 2,098 candidates. Tamil Nadu set a new voter turnout record for Lok Sabha elections with 73%, while West Bengal experienced the highest voter turnout for the day at 82%. As compared to that, urban centres such as Mumbai and Chennai saw lower voter turnouts, but bettered their figures from previous years. Mumbai witnessed a 53% turnout, compared to 41% in 2009. The rural areas of Maharashtra saw over 60% turnout, Madhya Pradesh had 64%, Uttar Pradesh had over 60%, Chhattisgarh had about 66%, Assam had over 70%, Bihar has about 60%, Jharkhand had 63.4%, Rajasthan had about 60% and Pudhucherry had about 82%. One of six constituencies from Jammu and Kashmir, Anantnag, had the lowest turnout of 28%, after a boycott call by separatists, an attack on 22 April that killed three people, and with thousands of Kashmiri Pandits protesting in the afternoon that their names were missing from the electoral roll. As with previous phases, the overall voter turnout for the day was higher than 2009. In both Madhya Pradesh and Rajasthan, the turnout was about 9% higher, while Uttar Pradesh saw a 13% increase.

- Phase 7: 30 April

The 7th phase of voting entailed about 140 million eligible voters to elect 89 members of parliament from 1,295 candidates in seven states and two Union Territories. Punjab set a new record in its voter turnout for general elections with 73%. Gujarat saw the highest jump in voter turnout for the day with 62% turnout compared to 48% turnout in 2009 Lok Sabha elections. The nine constituencies in West Bengal reported over 81% turnout. Uttar Pradesh witnessed 57% turnout compared to 48% in 2009, while Bihar saw 60% compared to 52% in 2009. One of six constituencies from Jammu and Kashmir, eligible to vote in this phase, had the lowest turnout for the day at 26% compared to 25.55% in 2009, after a boycott call by separatists. Telangana region of Andhra Pradesh, which will become India's new state on 2 June 2014, saw nearly 72% turnout to elect Lok Sabha members as well as its first state government. The aggregate turnout so far in the first 7 phases for 438 parliamentary seats has been 66.20%, significantly more than 57.41% figure in 2009 general elections.

- Phase 8: 7 May

The 8th phase saw voting for 64 Lok Sabha seats in seven states with 897 candidates competing. Along with the general elections, polls were also held for the first Legislative Assembly of Andhra Pradesh excluding Telangana region. The voter turnout was high, with West Bengal, Andhra Pradesh and Himachal Pradesh each setting their respective general election voter turnout records. West Bengal recorded 81% polling compared to 78% for 2009. Andhra Pradesh recorded nearly 76% voter turnout. Himachal Pradesh saw about 66% turnout compared to 58% for 2009. Uttarakhand also set a new voter turnout record with 62% compared to 53% in 2009. The 2 constituencies of Jammu & Kashmir that voted witnessed a 49.9% turnout, while constituencies of Bihar saw 58% compared to 45% in 2009. Uttar Pradesh experienced a 55.5% turnout compared to 43.4% in 2009.

- Phase 9: 12 May

The 9th and last phase of voting entailed over 90 million eligible voters to elect 41 members of parliament from 606 candidates in 3 states. The 6 seats in Bihar saw a voter turnout of 58%, compared to 46% in 2009. Uttar Pradesh's 18 constituencies witnessed a 55.3% turnout, compared to 46.6% in 2009. In West Bengal, the 17 constituencies that voted, saw a turnout of about 80% compared to 82% in 2009.

The 2014 general elections, according to the Election Commission of India, recorded a cumulative total of 66.38% voter turnout, or 551.3 million out of 814 million eligible people casting their vote, according to provisional figures. The 2014 turnout surpassed India's previous highest voter turnout record of 64% in 1984 general elections. The voter turnout in 2009 general elections was 58.19%, while 2004 general elections saw a voter turnout of 56.98%. The 2014 general elections entailed 8,202 candidates competing for 543 seats.

=== Re-polls ===
Many locations required re-polling for various reasons. There was re-polling on 9 polling stations in Orissa on 25 April. The Election Commission ordered re-polls in 52 polling booths (30 in Andhra Pradesh & Telangana, 11 in Uttar Pradesh and 11 in West Bengal) because of complaints of booth capturing, rigging, violence or as demanded by the locals. The re-poll was held on 13 May. In Uttar Pradesh, re-polls were held in 3 polling booths in Muzaffarnagar, 7 in Ferozabad and 1 in Badaun. Re-polling also occurred on 14 May in Arunachal Pradesh and on 15 May in the states of Nagaland and Haryana. The Left parties and BJP alleged mass rigging and booth capturing by Trinamool Congress at thousands of polling stations in West Bengal. AAP demanded re-polling in 108 booths.

Congress demanded re-polling at 1,344 polling stations in Nagaland. Re-polling was done in two polling stations in Tamil Nadu on 10 May and in 3 polling stations in Andhra Pradesh(Rayalaseema & Coastal Andhra) on 13 May. In Bihar, there was re-polling on 2 polling stations of Sitamarhi on 11 May and 3 polling stations in Muzaffarnagar went to re-polling on 13 May. On 15 May, there was re-polling in one booth in Tamil Nadu, and at 5 booths in West Bengal, Bihar, Nagaland. It was reported that not a single voter turned up for a re-poll at 5 polling stations in Nagaland on 15 May. On 12 May, the Bombay High court declined to order supplementary polling for voters in Maharashtra whose names were missing from the electoral rolls. There were speculated to be as many as 100,000 voters missing from the electoral roll in Pune and as many as 200,000 missing from electoral roll in Mumbai.

=== Voting pattern ===
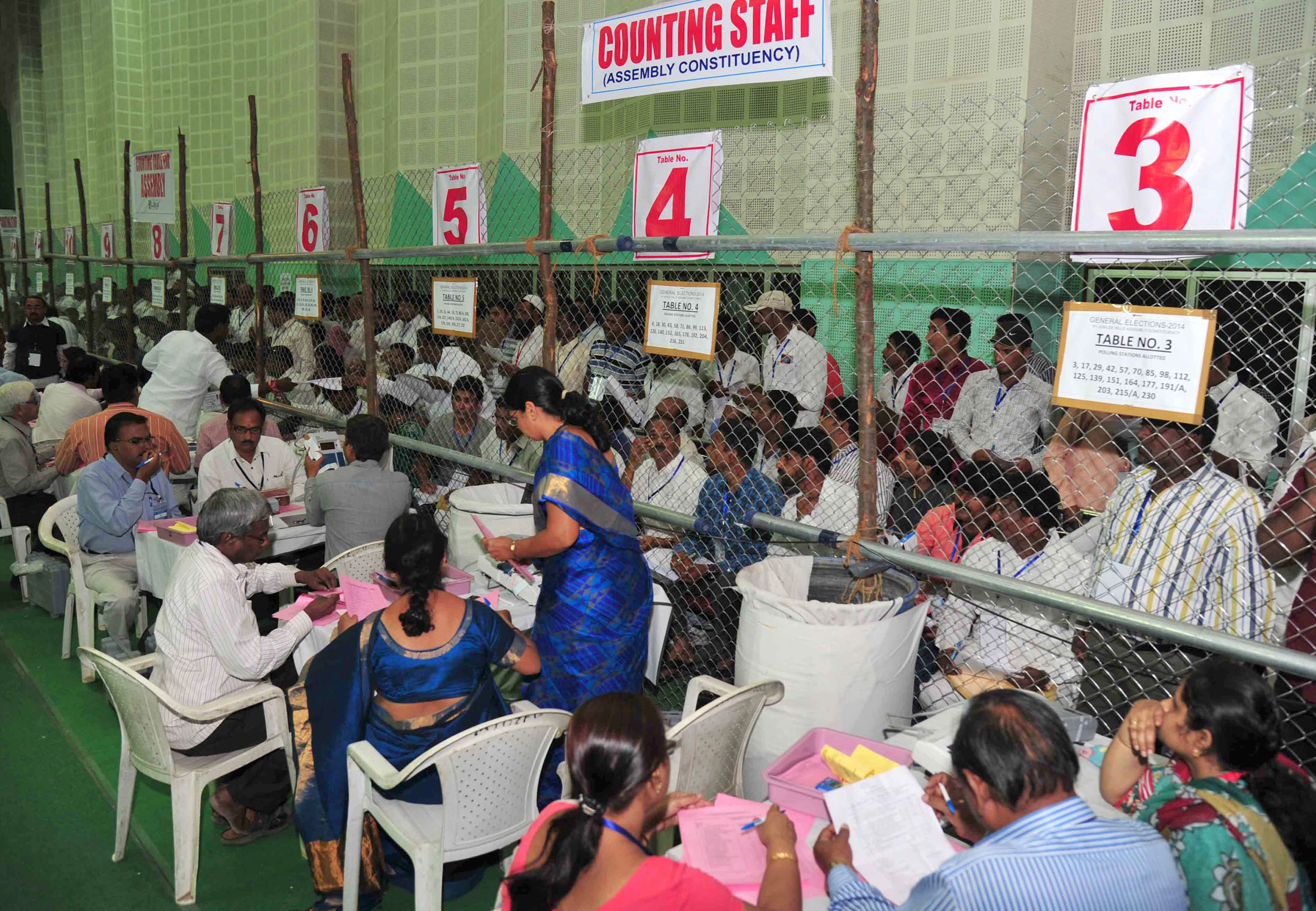
Votes being counted at Kotla Vijay Bhaskar Reddy Indoor Stadium, Hyderabad

The BJP secured 39% support from first time voters, while Congress received 19% of the first time votes. The NDA won 39 of 74 seats where Muslim voters make up between 21 and 95% of the total electorate. The BJP won all 16 seats in Uttar Pradesh. It also secured 5 out of 9 such seats in Bihar. Analyst Saeed Naqvi believes that Amit Shah managed to convince Dalits and OBC voters to elect the BJP as "Muslim appeasers in an atmosphere of perpetual communal tension".

The BJP won all 26 seats in Gujarat, marking the first time a single party won all seats in the state. The previous record was held by the Congress which won 25 of the 26 seats in the 1984 general election. The assembly segment-wise result of Lok Sabha elections in Uttar Pradesh shows that the BJP was number one in 328 seats, while the ruling SP led in just 42. Congress was ahead in 15, BSP 9 and Apna Dal 9. In 2012, SP had formed government by winning 224 assembly seats. BSP had won 80, BJP 47, Congress 28 and Apna Dal one.

Similarly, in Maharashtra BJP-Shiva Sena alliance has got a lead in 246 assembly segments out of the total 288. By securing seven of the 10 Lok Sabha seats in Haryana, BJP remained ahead on 52 assembly segments in the state. Its ally HJC could not win any of the Lok Sabha seats it contested, but its candidates remained ahead in seven assembly segments. BJP contested 8 Lok Sabha seats in Haryana, leaving two constituencies for its alliance partner HJC. BJP candidates remained ahead in all 27 assembly segments of Ambala, Karnal and Faridabad parliamentary constituencies. BJP won all seats except Rohtak where its candidate Om Prakash Dhankar lost to Haryana chief minister Bhupinder Singh Hooda's son and sitting MP Deepender Hooda.

== Results ==
Party	Votes	%	Seats
Bharatiya Janata Party	171,660,230	31.00	282
Indian National Congress	106,935,942	19.31	44
Bahujan Samaj Party	22,946,346	4.14	0
All India Trinamool Congress	21,262,665	3.84	34
Samajwadi Party	18,673,089	3.37	5
All India Anna Dravida Munnetra Kazhagam	18,111,579	3.27	37
Communist Party of India (Marxist)	17,988,955	3.25	9
Telugu Desam Party	14,099,230	2.55	16
YSR Congress Party	13,995,435	2.53	9
Aam Aadmi Party	11,325,387	2.05	4
Shiv Sena	10,262,544	1.85	18
Dravida Munnetra Kazhagam	9,631,246	1.74	0
Biju Janata Dal	9,489,946	1.71	20
Nationalist Congress Party	8,635,558	1.56	6
Rashtriya Janata Dal	7,440,937	1.34	4
Telangana Rashtra Samithi	6,736,270	1.22	11
Janata Dal (United)	5,992,281	1.08	2
Communist Party of India	4,327,460	0.78	1
Janata Dal (Secular)	3,731,481	0.67	2
Shiromani Akali Dal	3,636,148	0.66	4
Indian National Lok Dal	2,799,899	0.51	2
All India United Democratic Front	2,333,040	0.42	3
Lok Janshakti Party	2,295,929	0.41	6
Desiya Murpokku Dravida Kazhagam	2,078,843	0.38	0
Pattali Makkal Katchi	1,827,566	0.33	1
Revolutionary Socialist Party	1,666,380	0.30	1
Jharkhand Mukti Morcha	1,637,994	0.30	2
Jharkhand Vikas Morcha (Prajatantrik)	1,579,772	0.29	0
Marumalarchi Dravida Munnetra Kazhagam	1,417,535	0.26	0
All India Forward Bloc	1,211,418	0.22	0
Swabhimani Paksha	1,105,073	0.20	1
Indian Union Muslim League	1,100,096	0.20	2
Rashtriya Lok Samta Party	1,078,473	0.19	3
Communist Party of India (Marxist–Leninist) Liberation	1,007,275	0.18	0
Naga People's Front	994,505	0.18	1
Apna Dal	821,820	0.15	2
Bahujan Mukti Party	791,951	0.14	0
Jammu and Kashmir Peoples Democratic Party	732,644	0.13	3
Maharashtra Navnirman Sena	708,010	0.13	0
Haryana Janhit Congress (BL)	703,698	0.13	0
Rashtriya Lok Dal	696,918	0.13	0
All India Majlis-E-Ittehadul Muslimeen	685,730	0.12	1
Viduthalai Chiruthaigal Katchi	606,110	0.11	0
Asom Gana Parishad	577,730	0.10	0
National Peoples Party	576,448	0.10	1
Socialist Unity Centre of India (Communist)	520,972	0.09	0
Peace Party	518,724	0.09	0
Peasants and Workers Party of India	497,721	0.09	0
All Jharkhand Students Union	488,719	0.09	0
Rashtriya Samaj Paksha	458,580	0.08	0
Kerala Congress (M)	424,194	0.08	1
Jammu & Kashmir National Conference	396,713	0.07	0
Social Democratic Party of India	396,524	0.07	0
Bharipa Bahujan Mahasangh	360,854	0.07	0
Quami Ekta Dal	354,577	0.06	0
Bodoland People's Front	330,106	0.06	0
Socialist Janata (Democratic)	307,597	0.06	0
Gondwana Ganatantra Party	301,366	0.05	0
Bahujan Vikas Aaghadi	293,681	0.05	0
Puthiya Tamilagam	262,812	0.05	0
All India N.R. Congress	255,826	0.05	1
Manithaneya Makkal Katchi	236,679	0.04	0
Welfare Party of India	228,645	0.04	0
Jai Bharat Samanta Party	215,607	0.04	0
Republican Party of India (Athawale)	206,689	0.04	0
Jai Samaikyandhra Party	204,260	0.04	0
Jharkhand Party	203,869	0.04	0
Pyramid Party of India	185,478	0.03	0
Ambedkarite Party of India	185,095	0.03	0
Lok Satta Party	165,670	0.03	0
Sikkim Democratic Front	163,698	0.03	1
Aama Odisha Party	155,900	0.03	0
National Unionist Zamindara Party	124,990	0.02	0
Sikkim Krantikari Morcha	121,956	0.02	0
Suheldev Bhartiya Samaj Party	118,947	0.02	0
Communist Party of India (Marxist–Leninist) Red Star	114,323	0.02	0
Marxist Co-ordination Committee	110,185	0.02	0
Jharkhand Disom Party	109,843	0.02	0
United Democratic Party	106,817	0.02	0
385 other parties with fewer than 100,000 votes	4,017,081	0.73	0
Independents	16,737,720	3.02	3
None of the above	6,002,942	1.08	–
Nominated Anglo-Indians			2
Total	553,802,946	100.00	545
Valid votes	553,802,946	99.93	
Invalid/blank votes	368,873	0.07	
Total votes	554,171,819	100.00	
Registered voters/turnout	834,082,814	66.44	
Source: ECI

About one-third of all winners had at least one pending criminal case against them, with some having serious criminal cases. A candidate with criminal case(s) had 13% chance of winning the election, whereas a candidate with a clean record had only 5% chance of winning. (Here, chance of winning = (No. of winners in the category)/( Total no. of candidates in that category).)

Out of the 542 members analysed, 443 (82%) had total assets of ₹1 crore (US$110,000) or more. In the 15th Lok Sabha, out of 521 members analysed, 300 (58%) members had assets of ₹1 crore (US$110,000) or more. The average assets per member are ₹14.7 crore (US$1.6 million) (in 2009, this figure was ₹5.35 crore (US$570,000)).

=== Proportionality ===
The proportionality of parliamentary seats won in the 2014 election, as measured by the Gallagher index, yielded an index score of 17.53, indicating a disproportionate outcome that strongly favoured the BJP while being significantly disadvantageous for most other parties and independents.

=== Results by Region ===
Region	States	Total Seats	Party	Won	Change
Northern	Jammu & Kashmir (6); Himachal Pradesh (4); Haryana (10); Punjab (13); Uttarakhand (5); Uttar Pradesh (80)	118	Bharatiya Janata Party	92	▲78
Northern	Jammu & Kashmir (6); Himachal Pradesh (4); Haryana (10); Punjab (13); Uttarakhand (5); Uttar Pradesh (80)	118	Indian National Congress	6	▼40
Northern	Jammu & Kashmir (6); Himachal Pradesh (4); Haryana (10); Punjab (13); Uttarakhand (5); Uttar Pradesh (80)	118	Samajwadi Party	5	▼18
Northern	Jammu & Kashmir (6); Himachal Pradesh (4); Haryana (10); Punjab (13); Uttarakhand (5); Uttar Pradesh (80)	118	Shiromani Akali Dal	4	Steady
Northern	Jammu & Kashmir (6); Himachal Pradesh (4); Haryana (10); Punjab (13); Uttarakhand (5); Uttar Pradesh (80)	118	Aam Aadmi Party	4	New
Northern	Jammu & Kashmir (6); Himachal Pradesh (4); Haryana (10); Punjab (13); Uttarakhand (5); Uttar Pradesh (80)	118	Jammu & Kashmir People's Democratic Party	3	▲3
Northern	Jammu & Kashmir (6); Himachal Pradesh (4); Haryana (10); Punjab (13); Uttarakhand (5); Uttar Pradesh (80)	118	Indian National Lok Dal	2	▲2
Northern	Jammu & Kashmir (6); Himachal Pradesh (4); Haryana (10); Punjab (13); Uttarakhand (5); Uttar Pradesh (80)	118	Apna Dal	2	▲2
Western	Rajasthan (25); Gujarat (26); Maharashtra (48); Goa (2)	101	Bharatiya Janata Party	75	▲46
Western	Rajasthan (25); Gujarat (26); Maharashtra (48); Goa (2)	101	Shiv Sena	18	▲7
Western	Rajasthan (25); Gujarat (26); Maharashtra (48); Goa (2)	101	Nationalist Congress Party	4	▼4
Western	Rajasthan (25); Gujarat (26); Maharashtra (48); Goa (2)	101	Indian National Congress	3	▼46
Western	Rajasthan (25); Gujarat (26); Maharashtra (48); Goa (2)	101	Swabhimani Paksha	1	Steady
Central	Madhya Pradesh (29); Chhattisgarh (11)	40	Bharatiya Janata Party	37	▲24
Central	Madhya Pradesh (29); Chhattisgarh (11)	40	Indian National Congress	3	▼23
Southern	Karnataka (28); Telangana (17); Andhra Pradesh (25); Tamil Nadu (39); Kerala (20)	129	All India Anna Dravida Munnetra Kazhagam	37	▲28
Southern	Karnataka (28); Telangana (17); Andhra Pradesh (25); Tamil Nadu (39); Kerala (20)	129	Bharatiya Janata Party	21	▲2
Southern	Karnataka (28); Telangana (17); Andhra Pradesh (25); Tamil Nadu (39); Kerala (20)	129	Indian National Congress	19	▼41
Southern	Karnataka (28); Telangana (17); Andhra Pradesh (25); Tamil Nadu (39); Kerala (20)	129	Telugu Desam Party	16	▲10
Southern	Karnataka (28); Telangana (17); Andhra Pradesh (25); Tamil Nadu (39); Kerala (20)	129	Telangana Rashtra Samithi	11	▲9
Southern	Karnataka (28); Telangana (17); Andhra Pradesh (25); Tamil Nadu (39); Kerala (20)	129	YSR Congress Party	9	New
Southern	Karnataka (28); Telangana (17); Andhra Pradesh (25); Tamil Nadu (39); Kerala (20)	129	Communist Party of India	5	Steady
Southern	Karnataka (28); Telangana (17); Andhra Pradesh (25); Tamil Nadu (39); Kerala (20)	129	Indian Union Muslim League	2	Steady
Southern	Karnataka (28); Telangana (17); Andhra Pradesh (25); Tamil Nadu (39); Kerala (20)	129	Janata Dal	2	▼1
Southern	Karnataka (28); Telangana (17); Andhra Pradesh (25); Tamil Nadu (39); Kerala (20)	129	Independent politician	2	▲2
Southern	Karnataka (28); Telangana (17); Andhra Pradesh (25); Tamil Nadu (39); Kerala (20)	129	Communist Party of India	1	Steady
Southern	Karnataka (28); Telangana (17); Andhra Pradesh (25); Tamil Nadu (39); Kerala (20)	129	Pattali Makkal Katchi	1	▲1
Southern	Karnataka (28); Telangana (17); Andhra Pradesh (25); Tamil Nadu (39); Kerala (20)	129	All India Majlis-e-Ittehadul Muslimeen	1	Steady
Southern	Karnataka (28); Telangana (17); Andhra Pradesh (25); Tamil Nadu (39); Kerala (20)	129	Revolutionary Socialist Party	1	▲1
Southern	Karnataka (28); Telangana (17); Andhra Pradesh (25); Tamil Nadu (39); Kerala (20)	129	Kerala Congress	1	Steady
Eastern	Bihar (40); Jharkhand (14); Odisha (21); West Bengal (42)	117	Bharatiya Janata Party	37	▲16
Eastern	Bihar (40); Jharkhand (14); Odisha (21); West Bengal (42)	117	All India Trinamool Congress	34	▲15
Eastern	Bihar (40); Jharkhand (14); Odisha (21); West Bengal (42)	117	Biju Janata Dal	20	▲6
Eastern	Bihar (40); Jharkhand (14); Odisha (21); West Bengal (42)	117	Lok Janshakti Party	6	▲6
Eastern	Bihar (40); Jharkhand (14); Odisha (21); West Bengal (42)	117	Indian National Congress	6	▼9
Eastern	Bihar (40); Jharkhand (14); Odisha (21); West Bengal (42)	117	Rashtriya Janata Dal	4	Steady
Eastern	Bihar (40); Jharkhand (14); Odisha (21); West Bengal (42)	117	Rashtriya Lok Samata Party	3	▲3
Eastern	Bihar (40); Jharkhand (14); Odisha (21); West Bengal (42)	117	Janata Dal	2	▼18
Eastern	Bihar (40); Jharkhand (14); Odisha (21); West Bengal (42)	117	Communist Party of India	2	▼7
Eastern	Bihar (40); Jharkhand (14); Odisha (21); West Bengal (42)	117	Jharkhand Mukti Morcha	2	Steady
Eastern	Bihar (40); Jharkhand (14); Odisha (21); West Bengal (42)	117	Nationalist Congress Party	1	▲1
North-East	Assam (14); Arunachal Pradesh (2); Meghalaya (2); Manipur (2); Mizoram (1); Nagaland(1); Sikkim (1); Tripura (2)	25	Bharatiya Janata Party	8	▲4
North-East	Assam (14); Arunachal Pradesh (2); Meghalaya (2); Manipur (2); Mizoram (1); Nagaland(1); Sikkim (1); Tripura (2)	25	Indian National Congress	8	▼5
North-East	Assam (14); Arunachal Pradesh (2); Meghalaya (2); Manipur (2); Mizoram (1); Nagaland(1); Sikkim (1); Tripura (2)	25	All India United Democratic Front	3	▲2
North-East	Assam (14); Arunachal Pradesh (2); Meghalaya (2); Manipur (2); Mizoram (1); Nagaland(1); Sikkim (1); Tripura (2)	25	Communist Party of India	2	Steady
North-East	Assam (14); Arunachal Pradesh (2); Meghalaya (2); Manipur (2); Mizoram (1); Nagaland(1); Sikkim (1); Tripura (2)	25	National People's Party	1	Steady
North-East	Assam (14); Arunachal Pradesh (2); Meghalaya (2); Manipur (2); Mizoram (1); Nagaland(1); Sikkim (1); Tripura (2)	25	Naga People's Front	1	Steady
North-East	Assam (14); Arunachal Pradesh (2); Meghalaya (2); Manipur (2); Mizoram (1); Nagaland(1); Sikkim (1); Tripura (2)	25	Sikkim Democratic Front	1	Steady
North-East	Assam (14); Arunachal Pradesh (2); Meghalaya (2); Manipur (2); Mizoram (1); Nagaland(1); Sikkim (1); Tripura (2)	25	Independent politician	1	▲1
Union Territories	Chandigarh (1); Delhi (7); Dadra & Nagar Haveli (1); Daman & Diu (1); Lakshadweep (1); Puducherry (1); Andaman & Nicobar (1)	13	Bharatiya Janata Party	11	▲7
Union Territories	Chandigarh (1); Delhi (7); Dadra & Nagar Haveli (1); Daman & Diu (1); Lakshadweep (1); Puducherry (1); Andaman & Nicobar (1)	13	Nationalist Congress Party	1	▲1
Union Territories	Chandigarh (1); Delhi (7); Dadra & Nagar Haveli (1); Daman & Diu (1); Lakshadweep (1); Puducherry (1); Andaman & Nicobar (1)	13	All India N.R. Congress	1	▲1
Total	29 States and 7 UT	543			

==== Summary ====
Region	Total Seats	Bharatiya Janata Party			Indian National Congress			Others	
South India	130	22	22 / 130 (17%)	▲2	19	19 / 130 (15%)	▼42	90	▲40
West India	78	53	53 / 78 (68%)	▲26	2	2 / 78 (3%)	▼27	23	▲1
North India	225	190	190 / 225 (84%)	▲127	8	8 / 225 (4%)	▼71	27	▼56
North-East India	25	8	8 / 25 (32%)	▲4	8	8 / 25 (32%)	▼5	9	▲1
East India	63	3	3 / 63 (5%)	▲2	4	4 / 63 (6%)	▼8	56	▲5
Union Territories	22	6	6 / 22 (27%)	▲5	3	3 / 22 (14%)	▼9	0	Steady
Total	543	282	282 / 543 (52%)	+166	44	44 / 543 (8%)	-162	205	+9
Source: Times of India

=== By alliance ===
National Democratic Alliance (336)

282	18	16	6	4	3	2	1	1	1	1	1
BJP	SS	TDP	LJP	SAD	RLSP	AD	PMK	SWP	AINRC	NPP	NPF

United Progressive Alliance (60)

44	6	4	2	2	1	1
INC	NCP	RJD	IUML	JMM	KC(M)	RSP

Others (147)

37	34	20	11	2	3	4	3	2	2	5	1	1	9	3	1	9
AIADMK	AITC	BJD	TRS	INLD	AIUDF	AAP	J&KPDP	JD(S)	JD(U)	SP	SDF	AIMIM	YSRCP	IND.	CPI	CPI(M)

=== By state ===
Andaman and Nicobar Islands (1)

1
BJP

Party	Vote share %	Change	Seats won	Changes
Bharatiya Janata Party	47.8	+3.59	1	0
Indian National Congress	40.8	−1.23	0	0

Andhra Pradesh (25)

2	15	8
BJP	TDP	YSRCP

Party	Vote share %	Change	Seats won	Changes
Telugu Desam Party (NDA)	29.10	+4.17	15	+9
YSR Congress Party	28.90	+28.90	8	+8
Indian National Congress	11.5	−27.45	0	−19
Bharatiya Janata Party (NDA)	8.50	---	2	+2

Arunachal Pradesh (2)

1	1
BJP	INC

Party	Seats won
Bharatiya Janata Party	1
Indian National Congress	1

Assam (14)

7	3	3	1
BJP	INC	AIUDF	IND.

Party	Vote share %	Change	Seats won	Changes
Bharatiya Janata Party	36.50	+19.29	7	+3
Indian National Congress	29.60	−4.31	3	−4
All India United Democratic Front	14.80	−2.30	3	+2
Asom Gana Parishad	3.80	−8.81	0	−1
Independent (politician)	---	---	1	+1

Bihar (40)

22	6	3	2	4	1	2
BJP	LJP	RLSP	JD(U)	RJD	NCP	INC

Party	Vote share %	Change	Seats won	Changes
Bharatiya Janata Party (NDA)	29.40	+15.47	22	+10
Lok Janshakti Party (NDA)	6.40	---	6	+6
Rashtriya Janata Dal (UPA)	20.10	+0.80	4	0
Janata Dal (United)	15.80	−8.24	2	−18
Rashtriya Lok Samata Party (NDA)	3.00	---	3	+3
Nationalist Congress Party	1.20	---	1	+1
Indian National Congress (UPA)	8.40	−1.86	2	0
Independent	---	---	0	−2

Chandigarh (1)

1
BJP

Party	Vote share %	Change	Seats won	Changes
Bharatiya Janata Party	42.20	+19.46	1	+1
Indian National Congress	26.80	−20.07	0	−1
Aam Aadmi Party	24.00	New	0	0

Chhattisgarh (11)

10	1
BJP	INC

Party	Vote share %	Change	Seats won	Changes
Bharatiya Janata Party	48.70	−1.09	10	0
Indian National Congress	38.40	+13.67	1	0

Dadra & Nagar Haveli (1)

1
BJP

Party	Vote share %	Change	Seats won	Changes
Bharatiya Janata Party	48.90	+2.47	1	0
Indian National Congress	45.10	−0.75	0	0

Daman & Diu (1)

1
BJP

Party	Vote share %	Change	Seats won	Changes
Bharatiya Janata Party	53.80%	−11.46	1	0
Indian National Congress	43.30%	+14.29	0	0

NCT of Delhi (7)

7
BJP

NParty	Vote share %	Change	Seats won	Changes
Bharatiya Janata Party	46.40%		7	+7
Indian National Congress	15.10%	−42.01%	0	−7
Aam Aadmi Party	32.90%	+32.90%	0	0

Goa (2)

2
BJP

Party	Vote share %	Change	Seats won	Changes
Bharatiya Janata Party	53.40%	+8.62	2	+1
Indian National Congress	36.60%	−14.00	0	−1

Gujarat (26)

26
BJP

Party	Vote share %	Change	Seats won	Changes
Bharatiya Janata Party	59.10%	+12.59	26	+11
Indian National Congress	32.90%	−10.48	0	−11

Haryana (10)

7	2	1
BJP	INLD	INC

Party	Vote share %	Change	Seats won	Changes
Bharatiya Janata Party	34.70%		7	+7
Indian National Congress	22.90%	−18.87	1	−8
Indian National Lok Dal	24.40%		2	+2

Himachal Pradesh (4)

4
BJP

Party	Vote share %	Change	Seats won	Changes
Bharatiya Janata Party	53.31%	+3.72	4	+1
Indian National Congress	40.70%	−4.91	0	−1

Jammu and Kashmir (6)

3	3
BJP	JKPDP

Party	Vote share %	Change	Seats won	Changes
Bharatiya Janata Party	34.40%		3	+3
Indian National Congress	22.90%	−1.77	0	−2
Jammu & Kashmir People's Democratic Party	20.50%		3	+3
Jammu & Kashmir National Conference	11.10%	−8.00%	0	−3
Independent	---	---	0	−1

Jharkhand (14)

12	2
BJP	JMM

Party	Vote share %	Change	Seats won	Changes
Bharatiya Janata Party	40.10%	+12.57%	12	+4
Indian National Congress (UPA)	13.30%	−1.72%	0	−1
Jharkhand Vikas Morcha	12.10%		0	−1
Jharkhand Mukti Morcha (UPA)	9.30%	−2.4%	2	0
Independent	---	---	0	−2

Karnataka (28)

17	2	9
BJP	JD(S)	INC

Party	Vote share %	Change	Seats won	Changes
Bharatiya Janata Party	43.00%	−1.37	17	−2
Indian National Congress	40.80%	+3.15	9	+3
Janata Dal (Secular)	11.00%	−2.57%	2	−1

Kerala (20)

8	2	1	1	5	1	2
INC	IUML	KC(M)	RSP	CPI(M)	CPI	IND.

Party	Vote share %	Change	Seats won	Changes
Indian National Congress	31.10%		8	−5
Communist Party of India (Marxist)	21.60%		5	+1
Communist Party of India	7.60%		1	+1
Indian Union Muslim League	4.50%		2	0
Kerala Congress (M)	2.40%		1	0
Revolutionary Socialist Party			1	+1
Bharatiya Janata Party	10.30%		0	0
IND. (backed by Left Democratic Front)			2	+2

19 July 2018 Jose K Mani quit the lower house after being nominated to Rajya Sabha.

Lakshadweep (1)

1
NCP

Party	Vote share %	Change	Seats won	Changes
Nationalist Congress Party	50.10%	+3.79	1	+1
Indian National Congress	46.60%	−5.32	0	−1

Madhya Pradesh (29)

27	2
BJP	INC

Party	Vote share %	Change	Seats won	Changes
Bharatiya Janata Party	55.00%	+10.55	27	+10
Indian National Congress	34.90%	−5.24%	2	−9
Bahujan Samaj Party	3.8%	−2.05%	0	−1

Maharashtra (48)

23	18	1	4	2
BJP	Shiv Sena	SWP	NCP	INC

Party	Vote share %	Change	Seats won	Changes
Bharatiya Janata Party (NDA)	27.30%	+9.13%	23	+14
Shiv Sena (NDA)	20.60%	+3.60%	18	+7
Indian National Congress (UPA)	18.10%	−1.51	2	−15
Nationalist Congress Party (UPA)	16.00%	−3.28	4	−4
Swabhimani Paksha (NDA)	2.30%		1	0
Bahujan Vikas Aaghadi	---	---	0	−1
Independent	---	---	0	−1

Manipur (2)

2
INC

Party	Vote share %	Change	Seats won	Changes
Bharatiya Janata Party	11.90%		0	0
Indian National Congress	41.70%	−1.26%	2	0
Naga People's Front	19.90%		0	0
Communist Party of India	14.00%		0	0

Meghalaya (2)

1	1
NPP	INC

Party	Vote share %	Change	Seats won	Changes
Bharatiya Janata Party (NDA)	8.90%		0	0
Indian National Congress (UPA)	37.90%	−6.94%	1	0
National People's Party (NDA)	22.20%	+22.20	1	+1
Nationalist Congress Party (UPA)	---	−18.78%	0	−1

Mizoram (1)

1
INC

Party	Vote share %	Change	Seats won	Changes
Indian National Congress	48.60%	+16.98	1	0

Nagaland (1)

1
NPF

Party	Vote share %	Change	Seats won	Changes
Naga People's Front (NDA)	68.70%	−1.26	1	0
Indian National Congress	30.10%			0

Odisha (21)

20	1
BJD	BJP

Party	Vote share %	Change	Seats won	Changes
Biju Janata Dal	44.10%	+6.87	20	+6
Bharatiya Janata Party	21.50%		1	+1
Indian National Congress	26.00%	−6.75	0	−6
Communist Party of India	0.3%	−2.27%	0	−1

Puducherry (1)

1
All India N R Congress

Party	Vote share %	Change	Seats won	Changes
All India N.R. Congress (NDA)	34.60%	+34.60	1	+1
Indian National Congress	26.3%	−23.16%	0	−1
All India Anna Dravida Munnetra Kazhagam	17.93%	+17.93%	0	0

Punjab (13)

2	4	4	3
BJP	SAD	AAP	INC

Party	Vote share %	Change	Seats won	Changes
Indian National Congress	33.10%	−12.13	3	−5
Shiromani Akali Dal	20.30%	−13.55%	4	0
Bharatiya Janata Party	8.70%	−1.36	2	+1
Aam Aadmi Party	30.40%	+30.40%	4	+4

Rajasthan (25)

25
BJP

Party	Vote share %	Change	Seats won	Changes
Bharatiya Janata Party	50.90%	+7.71	25	+21
Indian National Congress	30.40%	−16.79	0	−20

Sikkim (1)

1
SDF

Party	Vote share %	Change	Seats won	Changes
Sikkim Democratic Front	53.00%	−13.30	1	0
Sikkim Krantikari Morcha	39.50%	+39.50%	0	0
Bharatiya Janata Party	2.40%	+0.59	0	0
Indian National Congress	2.30%	−27.26%	0	0

Tamil Nadu (39)

37	1	1
AIADMK	PMK	BJP

Party	Vote share %	Change	Seats won	Changes
All India Anna Dravida Munnetra Kazhagam	44.30%	+21.42%	37	+28
Dravida Munnetra Kazhagam	23.60%	−1.49	0	−18
Bharatiya Janata Party	5.50%		1	+1
Pattali Makkal Katchi	4.40%		1	+1

Telangana (17)

11	2	1	1	1	1
TRS	INC	BJP	TDP	YSRCP	AIMIM

Party	Vote share %	Change	Seats won	Changes
Telangana Rashtra Samithi	33.90	+7.76	11	+9
Indian National Congress	20.5	−27.45	2	-10
Bharatiya Janata Party	8.50	---	1	+1
Telugu Desam Party	3.10	+4.17	1	-1
YSR Congress Party	2.90	+2.90	1	+1
All India Majlis-e-Ittehadul Muslimeen	1.40	−0.53	1	0

Tripura (2)

2
CPI(M)

Party	Vote share %	Change	Seats won	Changes
Communist Party of India (Marxist)	64.00%	+2.31	2	0
Indian National Congress	15.20%		0	0
Bharatiya Janata Party	5.70%		0	0

Uttar Pradesh (80)

71	5	2	2
BJP	SP	INC	AD

Party	Vote share %	Change	Seats won	Changes
Bharatiya Janata Party	42.30%	+24.80	71	+61
Samajwadi Party	22.20%	−1.06	5	-22
Bahujan Samaj Party	19.60%	−7.82	0	−16
Indian National Congress	7.50%	−10.75	2	−19
Apna Dal	1.00%		2	+2

Uttarakhand (5)

5
BJP

Party	Vote share %	Change	Seats won	Changes
Bharatiya Janata Party	55.30%		5	+5
Indian National Congress	34.00%	−9.13	0	−5

West Bengal (42)

2	4	2	34
BJP	INC	CPI(M)	TMC

Party	Vote share %	Change	Seats won	Changes
All India Trinamool Congress	39.35%	+8.60	34	+15
Communist Party of India (Marxist)	22.71%	−10.1	2	−13
Bharatiya Janata Party	16.84%	+10.90	2	+1
Indian National Congress	9.58%	−3.80	4	−2

== Reactions ==
=== Domestic ===
Economic

The country's economic indicators were performing well in advance of the result in expectation of a BJP win, on the perception that Modi is business-friendly. The benchmark BSE Sensex and CNX Nifty indices hit record highs and the Indian rupee strengthened following months of poor performance. On the result day, as early vote counts gave the BJP a majority lead, the Sensex reached a record high of 25,375.63 points. It ended the day at a new closing high of 24,121.74. The Nifty reached a record high of 7,563.50, before ending the day at a new closing high of 7,203. The Indian rupee rose to an 11-month high of 58.62 against the US dollar and closed at 58.79. Deutsche Bank revised its December 2014 target for the Sensex to 28,000, and Macquarie revised its 12-month target for the Nifty to 8,400 from 7,200. Edelweiss set its December 2014 targets for the Sensex and Nifty at 29,000 and 9,000 respectively.

Media

India Times suggested that the election was watched in Pakistan with Modi being the less popular candidate than AAP's Kejriwal. Comparisons were made between the latter and the Pakistan Tehreek-e-Insaf's Imran Khan. Analysts suggested a high turnout would favour the BJP as it indicates an increase in participation of urban voters who are the party's traditional vote bank. Others have suggested however, that this could indicate an increase in voting amongst the 150 million Muslims that generally support the INC. Varghese K George, the political editor of The Hindu said that both readings rely on too many assumptions but that the only reading so far was the BJP was "doing well [and] Modi is managing to make some connection with voters and the Congress is doing pretty badly."

Politicians

When it became clear that the BJP would win the election, Narendra Modi tweeted, "India has won! Bharat ki Vijay. Ache din ane wale hai (good days are ahead)." This tweet instantly became India's most retweeted Twitter post. Manmohan Singh congratulated Modi by telephone. Congress President Sonia Gandhi accepted the defeat and congratulated the new government saying, "I congratulate the next government. I take full responsibility for the loss of Congress." Rahul Gandhi also did the same saying, "The new government has been given a mandate by the people. As Congress Vice President I hold myself responsible. The Congress party has done badly."

Although the Congress had been voted out of power in past too, but this was the first time since the 1977 general elections that the Congress did not happen to be the single largest party in terms of percentage of votes obtained. At a voteshare of around 19%, it was the lowest ever share of votes polled by the Congress party nationally since the country's first general elections, surpassing the record of 25.82% voteshare polled in 1998 general elections. It was also for the first time in the history of the nation that INC had less than 100 MPs in the Lok Sabha, surpassing the record of 114 seats in 1999 general elections. Since the Congress had won less than 54 seats, it would be also for the first time in the history of the nation that a non-Congress government does not have an official LoP from the INC. Hence these results are considered to be the worst ever performance of the Indian National Congress in its history.

Former Union Minister of Rural Development Jairam Ramesh said, "I am surprised by the results, especially in Telangana and Jharkhand. There was clearly a Modi effect." At the Congress Working Committee (CWC) meeting on 19 May, general secretary Mohan Prakash claimed that Israeli intelligence agency Mossad and the RSS had been working together since 2009 to defeat the UPA government. Prakash further claimed that this was because of Israel's unhappiness with the UPA government. According to him, this was because the UPA only had limited political relations with Israel, unlike the previous NDA government. Outgoing Finance Minister P. Chidambaram criticised the style of functioning and work culture at the Congress headquarters for the loss, and suggested adopting a more corporate approach. Some Congress members blamed Japanese communication agency Dentsu, which had been hired by the party, at a cost of nearly ₹ 6 billion, to handle their election advertising campaign and image makeover of Rahul Gandhi along with another agency Burson-Marsteller. Chairman of the party's communication department Ajay Maken harshly criticised Dentsu India executive chairman Rohit Ohri for a "spineless campaign". Priya Dutt, Secretary of the party's communication department, pointed out the gap between the people and the Congress leadership stating, "We need to bridge that gap. We need to bring that right up to the leadership. There is a lot of criticism. We have to look at where we have gone wrong in the past 10 years." DNA described the accusations against Mossad, RSS and Dentsu as "bizarre theories", and noted that "everyone except vice-president Rahul Gandhi has been held responsible for their crushing defeat."

Union minister in the outgoing government Milind Deora told The Indian Express on 21 May that although "many factors" led to the party's defeat and Rahul's leadership alone could not be blamed, "it was not about one person's image but the people surrounding that person also. Deora stated that many party members felt that the decision makers in the party had "no electoral experience...no stature, standing, respect and credibility in the party". He accused the people who "were in charge of important departments and held key positions" of not listening to party cadres and MPs, which he believed prevented a "diverse opinion" from being heard and "shut out a lot of people". Deora stated, "A lot of us felt our voices were never heard. We felt our voices don't matter. This has to change. The MPs and ministers should not feel we are being not heard. It is not the advisors alone. The people who take the advice also have to bear responsibility. Those who gave advice and those who received the advice as also those who feel they can give better advice – all have to bear responsibility." Deora felt the party had to "open up" and "promote avenues for dissent and debate internally". When asked who was to blame, Deora said, "there are many people from top to bottom ... there was lack of coordination and the response was slow ... there was a very unresponsive attitude. ... the buck stops with the party." Although this statement received support from several Congress members, Deora clarified on Twitter, "My comments are out of emotions of deep loyalty to the party, pain of our performance & a sincere desire to see us bounce back. Nothing more." Senior party leader Satyavrat Chaturvedi expressed hope that an "honest and ruthless introspection" would be carried out fix the problems. He further stated that while Deora's statement may not have been fully correct, a "large portion of what he said is correct". Congress members such as Jairam Ramesh, Madan Gopal and Kanishka Singh criticised Rahul Gandhi's aides.

Individuals

Rajnikanth congratulated Narendra Modi on Twitter for his "historic win". The actor also congratulated Jayalalithaa for her party's performance in the election. Tamil actor Dhanush also tweeted congratulations to Modi. Several Bollywood celebrities including Subhash Ghai, Vishal Dadalani, Lata Mangeshkar, Ranvir Shorey, Vivek Oberoi, Baba Sehgal, Shekhar Kapur, Arshad Warsi, Preity Zinta, Arjun Rampal, Farhan Akhtar, Karan Johar, Sangeeth Sivan, Kabir Bedi, Anupam Kher, Madhur Bhandarkar, Atul Kasbekar and Pritish Nandy tweeted congratulations to Modi and the BJP for their victory.

President of Film Federation of India Ravi Kottarakara congratulated Modi "on behalf of the entire Indian film fraternity". CEO of the Film & TV Producers Guild of India Kulmmet Makkar described the "clear mandate" as being "great" for the Indian film industry. He also expressed "positive hopes" from the new government.

=== International ===
- Afghanistan – President Hamid Karzai sent congratulations. Karzai, who attended school in Shimla, spoke to Modi in Hindi. Spokesperson Aimal Faizi tweeted, "President #Karzai extends his warm Congratulations to @narendramodi on victory in elections. Afghans always regard #India as a true friend"
- Australia – Prime Minister Tony Abbott called Modi to congratulate him. He tweeted, "I've spoken to @narendramodi and congratulated him on his success. I look forward to strengthening ties between India and Australia". He further said that he was looking forward to meet Modi during the upcoming G-20 Summit to be held in Brisbane in November 2014.
- Bangladesh – Prime Minister Sheikh Hasina wrote, "The decisive verdict given by the people of your great country is a strong testimony to your dynamic, inspiring and visionary leadership qualities and manifestation of the trust and confidence reposed in you by the people of the largest democracy in the world. I am delighted to see a great friend of Bangladesh leading an extremely friendly country, India, in the coming days." She further stated, "I hope that you would find my country your second home and first destination for your official visit abroad". Hasina also sent a separate letter to BJP President Rajnath Singh congratulating him and party members for their "landslide victory", on behalf of the Bangladesh Awami League. Bangladesh Nationalist Party (BNP) chief Khaleda Zia, and the Jamaat-e-Islami also sent messages congratulating Modi.
- Bhutan – Prime Minister Tshering Tobgay and King Jigme Khesar Namgyel Wangchuck called Modi and congratulated him on his victory.
- Brunei – Brunei Sultan Hassanal Bolkiah sent a message of congratulations to Modi. In his message, the Sultan wished Modi success and looked forward to working with him to strengthen long-standing ties of friendship and co-operation between Brunei and India, including through work in the Commonwealth and the Asean-India Dialogue.
- Canada – Canadian High Commissioner Stewart Beck said, "I had the pleasure to meet with Modi during his time as the Chief Minister of Gujarat and I look forward to working with him to grow Canada's bilateral relationship with India. I also wish to congratulate the people of India on exercising their right to vote and showing the world the strength of their democratic system." Prime minister Stephen Harper sent a congratulatory message to Modi on 17 May.
- China – Chinese Foreign Ministry spokesperson Hua Chunying said, "China is willing to make joint efforts with the new Indian government, maintain high level exchanges, deepen cooperation in all areas and bring the China-India strategic partnership to new height." The Chinese government formally congratulated Modi on 23 May. The Chinese government had been waiting for Modi to be officially be sworn in before issuing a formal message, as they were conscious of protocol. Modi made four visits to China during his tenure as Chief Minister of Gujarat, resulting in over US$900 million worth of Chinese investments in Gujarat. Premier Li Keqiang congratulated Modi on 26 May. He stated that China viewed India as a "natural cooperative partner" and expressed his desire to work together for "peaceful, cooperative and common development" that would "not only bring benefits to their own people but also contribute to peace, stability and prosperity of Asia and beyond".
- Denmark – Prime Minister Helle Thorning-Schmidt called Modi and congratulated him on his victory.
- France – French Ambassador to India François Richier stated, "This massive vote of confidence highlights the vitality of Indian democracy. France is keen to work hand in hand with the new Indian leadership. Paris statement will follow formal announcement by Election Commission." President Francois Hollande congratulated Modi by telephone on 19 May. He invited him to come to France "when he wished". French Embassy officials stated, "He [Hollande] confirmed that he [Modi] would have France's support in the task at hand and reiterated his commitment to the strategic partnership and friendship between France and India, a partner and ally of France."
- Germany – On 15 May, the day prior to the results being declared, German Ambassador to India Michael Steiner stated, "An elected Prime Minister of India does not need a visa for Germany, he is welcome there". Chancellor Angela Merkel called Modi on 19 May, congratulated him on his victory and invited him to Berlin.
- Israel – Israeli Prime Minister Benjamin Netanyahu telephoned Narendra Modi to congratulate him. A statement read, "He [Netanyahu] said that he was looking forward to work with Mr. Modi and enhance bilateral cooperation".
- Japan – Prime Minister Shinzo Abe called Modi and congratulated him on his victory.
- Malaysia – Prime Minister Najib Razak congratulated Modi and the BJP on Twitter, and also stated that he was "looking forward to continuing strong Malaysia-India partnership" under the new government.
- Maldives – President Abdulla Yameen Abdul Gayoom congratulated Modi and sent wishes for "every success and prosperity". The President stated that India had chosen "the most proficient leadership". Modi was also congratulated by former President Mohamed Nasheed on Twitter. Indian High Commissioner to the Maldives Rajeev Shahare stated that relations between the countries would strengthen under the new prime minister.
- Mauritius – Prime Minister Navinchandra Ramgoolam sent a message to Modi on 16 May, congratulating Modi for "the impressive and well-deserved victory of his party". Ramgoolam stated that "these elections in the largest democracy of the world are yet again a testimony to the exceptional robustness of Indian democracy", and added that "Mauritius applauds and commends India for upholding her acclaimed democratic credentials to which Mauritius feels particularly attached". He further stated "your electoral victory is a defining moment in the contemporary history of your great country. It certainly reflects the trust that the people place in you to chart the future course of your nation. You embody the politics of hope and delivery to your people in their aspirations for development and prosperity".
- Nepal – Prime Minister Sushil Koirala congratulated Narendra Modi on his victory and invited him to visit Nepal. President Ram Baran Yadav also called Modi and BJP President Rajnath Singh to congratulate them on the BJP's victory.
- New Zealand – Prime Minister John Key congratulated Modi by letter. Key expressed hope that the two countries would be able to negotiate a free trade agreement, which they began discussing in 2010. However, talks later stalled and the last round of discussions was held in July 2013. The Prime Minister stated, "We are sort of hopeful we can reignite the free trade agreement with Modi as the new Prime Minister. He has obviously been very pro-business and he has had an overwhelming mandate delivered to him so you can see the Indian people want and expect to see high levels of economic growth. One of those things is trade, so we are certainly going to be taking it up with the new Indian Government at the appropriate time."
- Norway – Prime Minister Erna Solberg called Modi and congratulated him on his victory.
- Pakistan – Prime Minister Nawaz Sharif congratulated Modi and offered good wishes on the BJP's "impressive victory". Sharif also invited Modi to visit Pakistan.
- Qatar – Prime Minister Sheikh Abdullah bin Nasser bin Khalifa al-Thani congratulated Modi on his party's victory in the general election in a telephone conversation.
- Russia – President Vladimir Putin congratulated Modi and the BJP on the election victory gave a high assessment of the traditionally friendly ties between Russia and India. These ties have a foundation in the Declaration on Strategic Partnership, which was signed while the BJP was in power and set a development course for bilateral relations for years to come.
- Singapore – Prime Minister Lee Hsien Loong congratulated Modi and the BJP on Twitter and Facebook, and also stated that he was "looking forward to working with the new Indian Government to strengthen India-Singapore relations". Modi replied to the tweet stating, "@leehsienloong Thank you very much. Singapore is a valued friend & I am sure we will make our ties stronger in the times to come". Former Prime Minister Goh Chok Tong wrote, "I recall our meetings and frank exchange of views since 2006 when I visited Gujarat. You have always shown a strong resolve to bring economic prosperity to the Indian people.... I am confident that you will lead India to greater heights as Prime Minister, and further build on the excellent ties between our two countries."
- South Africa – President Jacob Zuma said in a statement on 17 May, "With India under the leadership of Mr Modi, the Government of South Africa looks forward to consolidating the strong bilateral political and economic relations that exist between our two sister Republics."
- Spain – President Mariano Rajoy sent a letter congratulating Modi on his "brilliant victory" in the election. Rajoy expressed his admiration for the "democratic spirit that reigned over such a complex election process". The President concluded his letter stating that he was looking forward to meeting Modi in person and offered his "warmest regards and deepest personal respect".
- Sri Lanka – President Mahinda Rajapaksa called Modi and congratulated him for a "great" victory. The President tweeted, "Called @narendramodi a short while ago; Congratulated on BJP victory & invited for a state visit to #SriLanka"
- Tibet – Tibetan Prime Minister-in-exile Lobsang Sangay thanked the UPA government "or their unwavering support for the Tibetan people during its two full terms", and also congratulated the BJP-led NDA for their victory.
- United Kingdom – Prime Minister David Cameron called Modi and congratulated him on the "election success" and stated that he was keen on working together, one of the first Western leaders to do. A spokesperson stated, "The prime minister called Narendra Modi this morning to congratulate him on his victory in the Indian elections and the record turnout, making this the biggest democratic election in history. Modi said he would be delighted to accept the Prime Minister's invitation to visit the UK. Both leaders agreed on the importance of the UK-India relationship and agreed to work together to strengthen it in the months ahead." Cameron also tweeted using his official account, "Congratulations @narendramodi on victory in India's elections. Keen to work together to get the most from UK-India relationship". British Foreign Minister William Hague stated, "I congratulate Narendra Modi and the BJP on their success and look forward to forging an even closer partnership with India in the months ahead. UK has strong ties with India and the British government looks forward to working with the new Indian government to build on this relationship and deliver security, growth and prosperity for both our nations."
- United States – White House Press Secretary Jay Carney said, "We congratulate Narendra Modi and the BJP on winning a majority of seats in this historic election. Once the government is formed, we look forward to working closely with the prime minister and the Cabinet to advance our strong bilateral relationship based on shared democratic values. The prime minister of India will be welcomed to the US." The White House National Security Council tweeted, "US congratulates BJP on its victory in India's historic election. We look forward to working with government once formed to advance our partnership". Secretary of State John Kerry tweeted, "Congrats to @narendramodi and BJP. Look forward to working w/you/growing shared prosperity/security w/world's largest democracy".

Narendra Modi responded to each tweet from world leaders thanking them for their support. The media reported the order in which Modi responded to the tweets, and noted that Barack Obama was the last to receive a reply from him. The New York Times observed that "the order in which he thanked them and one notable omission, later rectified, was more interesting than the content of the tweets themselves." The paper further stated, "The silence underscored what will be uncomfortable diplomatic theater in the weeks and months to come. The United States refused to issue Mr. Modi a visa in 2005 as a response to his alleged role in the 2002 Gujarat riots. As Mr. Modi's star rose in the past year, American leaders reached out, but a thaw on Mr. Modi's side has been almost imperceptible." State Department Spokesperson Jen Psaki said, "I think our relationship between the United States and India is so strong and enduring we won't worry about the Twitter rank order". John Kerry reiterated the United States' willingness to work with the new government as well as the importance of India-US relations on 20 May. He also added that he was looking forward to returning to India soon and "echo President Obama's invitation to Prime Minister Modi to visit the United States at the earliest opportunity." The Times of India noted that the first leader to receive a tweet from Modi was David Cameron. The United Kingdom was among the first countries to end a US-led diplomatic boycott of Modi. Mint stated that Modi's "more expansive responses" were to the leaders of Japan and Russia. According to former foreign secretary Lalit Mansingh, "It is natural that Modi feels affinity with some leaders who are strong leaders, proudly nationalistic, trying to fix the economy with firm measures."

International media

Prior to the announcement of the result, The Washington Post highlighted "...2014 will be the biggest year in the history of democracy, with more people than ever before going to the polls to decide their own fate...this really looks to be one of the most fascinating political events this year, and not just because of its scale...It's a fascinating moment in democracy, and one that shouldn't be ignored". The New York Times added that "the sheer size of the electorate makes this election the largest ever in the world and an inspiring celebration of universal adult suffrage," but also wrote "lurking behind the feel-good spectacle is the reality that India's elections are awash in illegal cash, serious violence and dirty tricks." Bloomberg Businessweek wrote of the election that the "process is awesome in its complexity, and the campaigns have given rise to robust debate...But here's something else not to miss: It's all pretty damn colorful." It highlighted five reasons that make the election interesting: Kejriwal's effect, Modi's wife; exit polls are barred but betting on the future prime minister was not and Modi was in the lead; "vote buying" through cash, alcohol or other means; and 3D campaigning. It also predicted better relations with Japan at the expense of relations with China under Modi, and asked whether a redefinition of India's nuclear weapons program would result from the elections.

An editorial in the China Daily, the Chinese government's official English-language newspaper, compared Modi's "preoccupation with development" with China's "own experiences and development philosophy", and argued that this had "inspired unprecedented optimism here over our South Asian neighbour's growth potential". The paper also argued that "western rhetoric" which stated that both countries were "destined to stand against each other" had been proven wrong by the fact that India and China had "by and large, managed their differences well over the decades". It also welcomed Modi's invitation to Pakistani Prime Minister Nawaz Sharif to attend his swearing-in ceremony.

Individuals and organisations

The 14th Dalai Lama sent a letter congratulating Modi for the BJP's "decisive victory". The Dalai Lama expressed hope that just as Modi had brought development and prosperity to Gujarat, India would continue to "flourish and prosper" under his leadership.

The American Jewish Committee (AJC) congratulated Narendra Modi, and expressed hope that his leadership would further strengthen India's relations with the US and Israel. Director of AJC's Asia Pacific Institute (API) Shira Loewenberg stated, "We look forward to working with Modi and the new government to further strengthen and deepen India's extensive relations with the United States and Israel. BJP has long been a friend to Israel and the Jewish people."

== Government formation ==
Manmohan Singh tendered his resignation to President Pranab Mukherjee on 17 May. He continued as caretaker Prime Minister, at the request of the President, until 26 May 2014, when Narendra Modi and his cabinet were sworn to office.

=== Support for the new government ===
Political Party	Seats	Alliance
Bharatiya Janata Party	282	National Democratic Alliance
Shiv Sena	18	National Democratic Alliance
Telugu Desham Party	17	National Democratic Alliance
Lok Janshakti Party	6	National Democratic Alliance
Shiromani Akali Dal	4	National Democratic Alliance
Pattali Makkal Katchi(PMK)	1	National Democratic Alliance
Naga People's Front	1	National Democratic Alliance
National People's Party (India)	1	National Democratic Alliance
Some other small parties	7	National Democratic Alliance
Total	337	National Democratic Alliance

Though the above parties supported BJP, BJP had already won 282 seats (more than the majority number required) hence BJP did not need their support, also the new Prime Minister didn't include most of them in Council of Ministers. This situation was different from Atal Bihari Vajpayee, he had to include many parties of NDA in his cabinet, due to lack of seats.

== See also ==
- List of members of the 16th Lok Sabha
