= Raj Kumar Gaur =

Indian politician

Member of Rajasthan Legislative Assembly
- In office 11 December 2018 – 2023
- Constituency: Ganganagar (Rajasthan Assembly constituency)

Personal details
- Born: 13 November 1948 (age 77) Ganganagar, Rajasthan, India
- Party: Independent
- Spouse: Meena Gaur
- Children: 2
- Education: Rajasthan University (LLB)
- Occupation: Politician

Raj Kumar Gaur is an Indian independent politician and member of 15th Legislative Assembly of Rajasthan from Ganganagar (Rajasthan Assembly constituency). He got 49,998 votes and defeated Ashok Chandak of Indian National Congress by the margin of 14,180 votes.
