= Kamini Jindal =

Indian politician

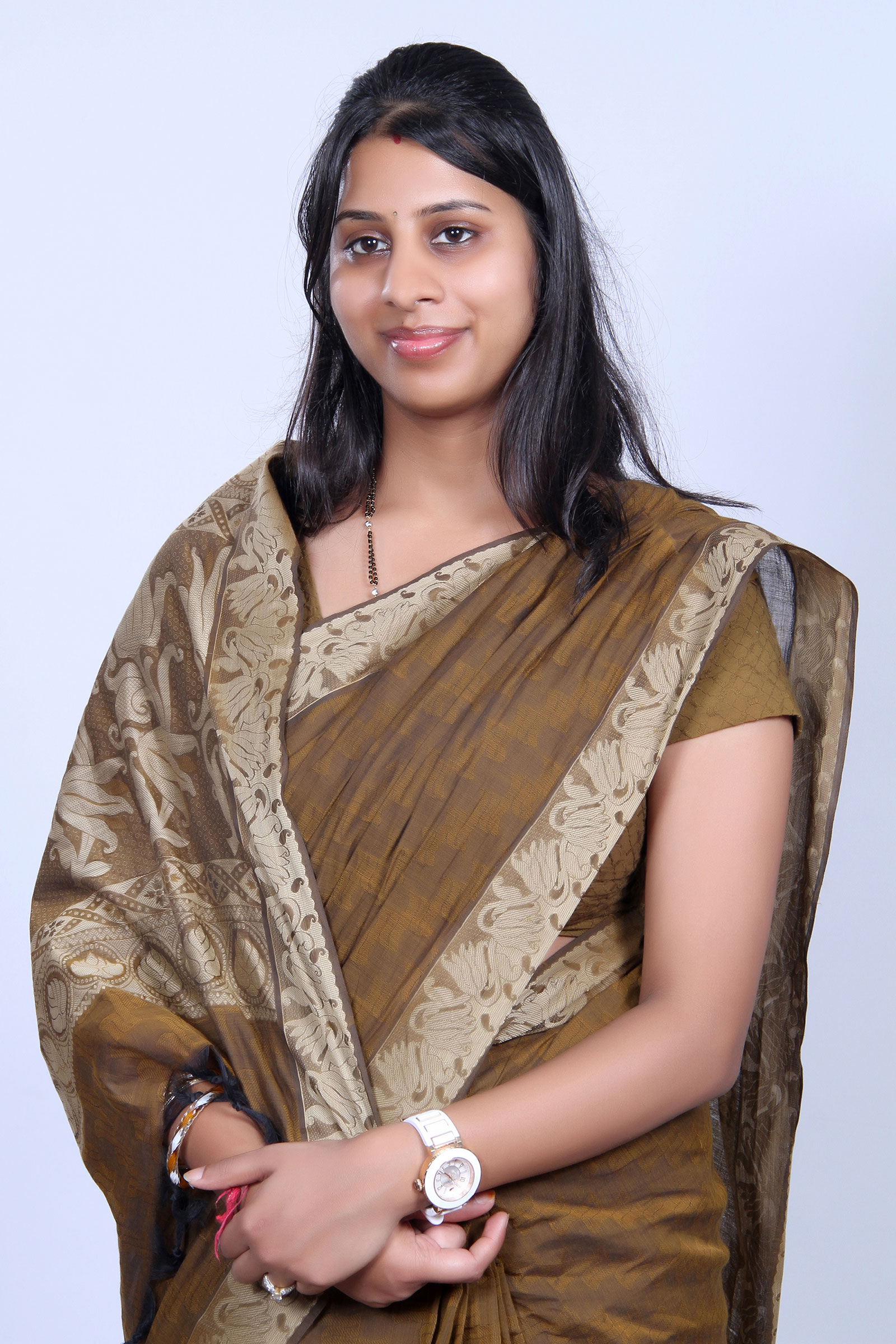
- Kamini Jindal before 2013 Rajasthan state elections.

MLA, Rajasthan
- In office 2013-2018
- Preceded by: Radheshyam
- Constituency: Sri Ganganagar

Personal details
- Born: 16 June 1988 (age 37) Hisar, Haryana, India
- Party: NUZP
- Spouse: Dr. Gagandeep Singla
- Website: www.kaminijindal.in

Kamini Jindal (born 16 June 1988) is an Indian politician and was a member of the Legislative Assembly representing Sri Ganganagar in Rajasthan.

She is the daughter of B.D. Aggarwal, founder of the National Unionist Zamindara Party, and wife of Dr. Gagandeep Singla an IPS officer in Rajasthan. Kamini Jindal actively supported Aam Aadmi Party in Delhi election by getting advertisements published in leading newspapers.

Kamini Jindal has been an Executive Director of Vikas WSP Limited since 16 July 2012.
