= National Unionist Zamindara Party =

- Abbreviation: NUZP
- President: B. D. Agarwal
- Parliamentary Chairperson: Kamini Jindal
- Founded: 2013
- Seats in Rajasthan Legislative Assembly: 0 / 200

Website
- http://zamindaraparty.com

The National Unionist Zamindara Party is a political party in Rajasthan, India. It was founded in 2013 by Guar farmers to represent their interests. While there is no connection to the historic Punjab Unionists, the party honours the legacy of Unionist leaders like Sir Chhotu Ram. The party won 2 seats in the 2013 state election.

In the 2014 Indian general election the party put up three candidates and received 124,990 votes.

In May 2018 one of the party's two MLAs, Sonadevi Bawri, joined the Indian National Congress.

The party fielded eight candidates in the 2018 Rajasthan Legislative Assembly election, but none were elected.
