= Barlan =

- Village
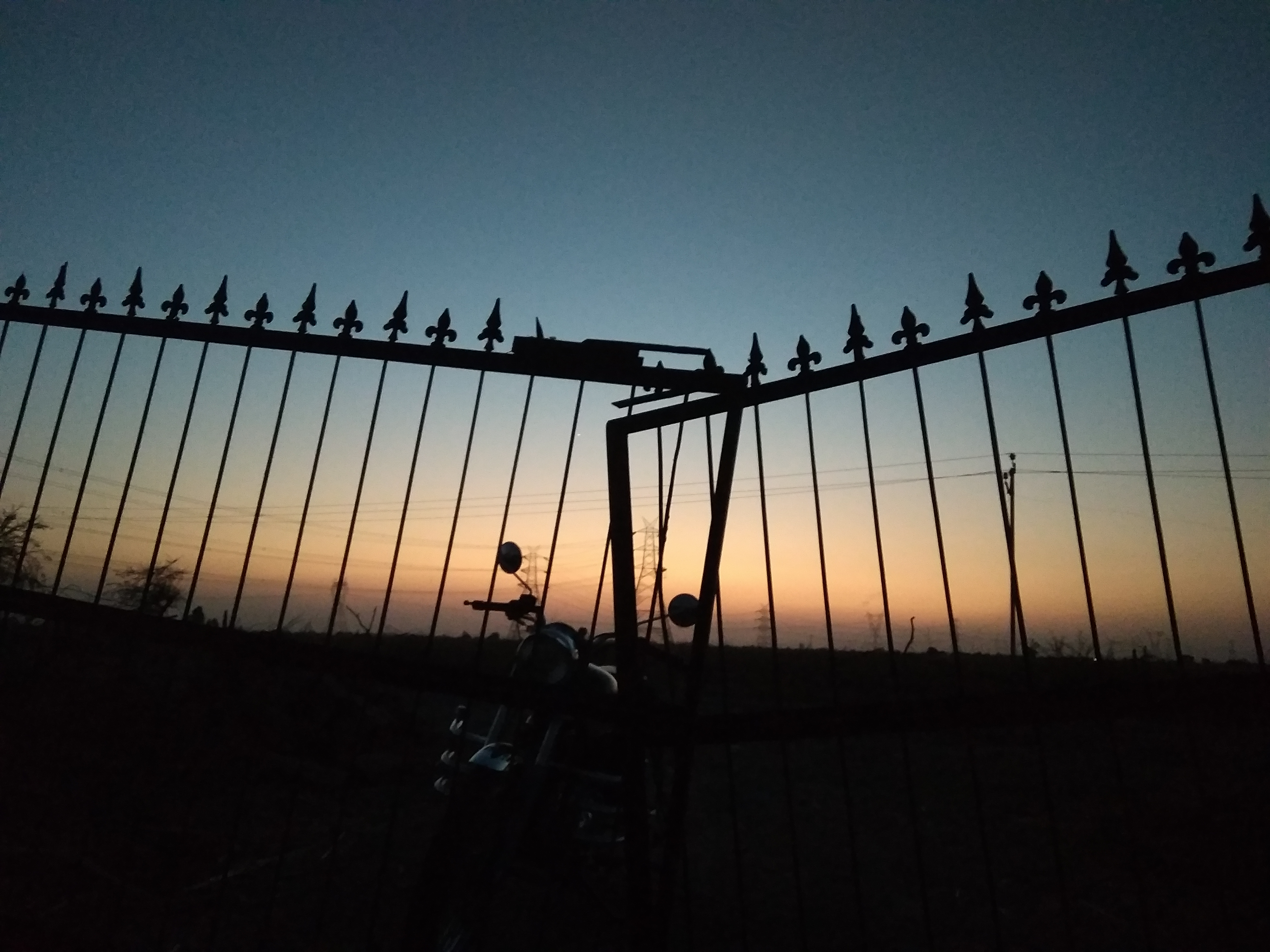

- Location within Rajasthan Location within India
- Coordinates: 24.824514°N 76.672263°E
- Country: India
- State: Rajasthan
- District: Baran (Hadoti Region)

Government
  - Type: Democratic
  - Body: Gram Panchayat
  - Sarpanch: Giriraj Dhakad
  - Member of Parliament Jhalawar-Baran (Lok Sabha constituency): Dushyant Singh (BJP)
  - Member of Legislative Assembly Atru-Baran Legislative constituency: Radheshyam Bairwa (BJP)

Area
  - Total: 6.8 km^{2} (2.6 sq mi)
- Elevation: 289 m (948 ft)

Population (2011)
  - Total: 838
  - Density: 120/km^{2} (320/sq mi)
- Demonym: Rajasthani

Languages
  - Official: Hindi, English
  - Native: Hadoti
- Time zone: UTC+5:30 (IST)
- PIN: 325218
- Telephone code: 07451
- Sex ratio: 905 ♀/♂
- Sex ratio: 1080 ♀/♂

Barlan is a village in the Hadoti region of Rajasthan, India. It serves as a Gram panchayat for five nearby villages which are Hani Hera, Patthukhedi, Amapura, Lolahedi and Seendhni. The nearest town is Atru, which is 7 km (4.3 mi) away. It is located 30 km from the district headquarter, Baran. Barlan is a pioneer in kabaddi sport. Barlan has produced the finest physical teachers.

== History ==
Barlan was feudal or jagir and was the part of Kota Riyasat along with other Zamindar feudal villages like Bhainsara(Bhensada) and Bokara(Bokada). The feudal tax as gold or equivalent valuable things were sent to Kota state on mules. They were escorted by the Zamindar. For mules, a special place was assigned to each Zamindar.

== Economy ==
The village is highly dependent on agriculture activities. People in the village raise livestock like buffalos, sheep, cows, goats, and poultry. Every household owns the small land but to grow crop is not possible for everyone. The input cost for plowing, sowing, maintenance, irrigation, and harvesting are very high. To avoid the economic burden of the land, people rent their land to other farmers. Since the groundwater level in Barlan is very low (800 feet), borewell often fails and results in the insurmountable burden of irrigation cost.

=== Crops and vegetables ===
Due to low monsoon rainfall and water depletion farmers usually grow two crops in a year. In 2018 Rabi crop winter season chana, and mustard was grown on almost 95% land of the village. Some farmers were not able to irrigate their crops not even once. The rate of irrigation per bigha goes from ₹1000 up to ₹ 3000 which is almost unbearable to any farmer.

== Literacy and employment ==
According to the 2011 census data, a total of 522 people in the village are literate. The overall literacy rate of Barlan is 71%; 85% for men, and 56% for women.

On the total population, 416 were engaged in work activities. 46.63% of workers describe their work as Main Work (Employment or Earning more than 6 Months) while 53.37% were involved in Marginal activity such as NREGA, providing a livelihood for less than 6 months. Of 416 workers engaged in Main Work, 126 were cultivators (owner or co-owner) while 46 were agricultural labourers.

== Sports and games ==
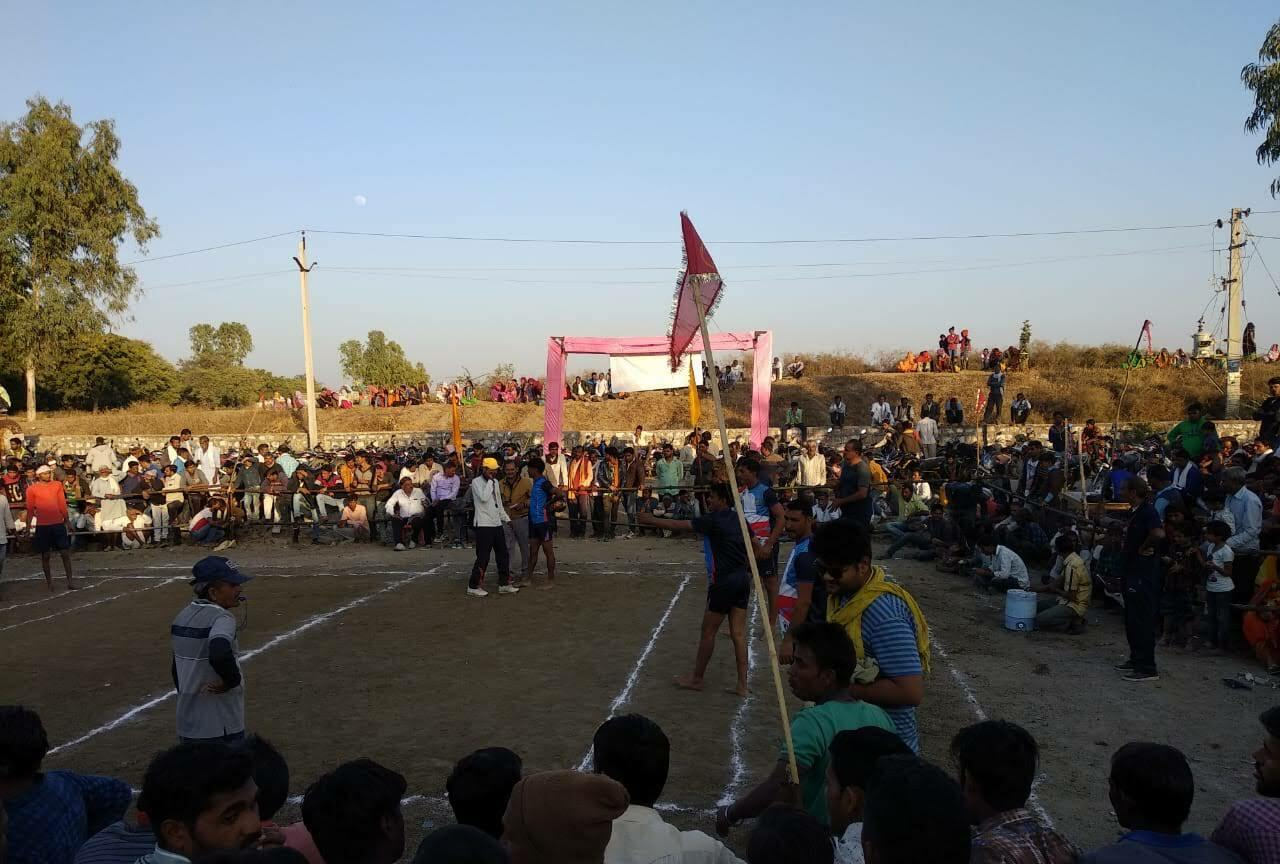
2019 Barlan Kabaddi tournament

Villager organizes a kabaddi tournament every year. Nearby village people came to see the matches with great enthusiasm. Many people from Barlan have played and won Kabaddi at state-level championships. Chandra Prakash Meena is the most notable Kabaddi player in Hadoti. He played at the state-level for more than five times.

== Infrastructure ==
The village is the part of the National Optical Fibre Network, a project under which all Gram Panchayats of India are provided a minimum of 100 Mbps broadband connectivity.

=== Road ===
The internal village is connected by Gramin Gaurav Path implemented by public works department of Rajasthan

National Highway 90 is 3 km from the village and connects to Baran, Rajasthan, and Chhabra.

=== Rail ===
Town Railway station Atru is 7 km from Barlan. It connects Kota, Jaipur, Jodhpur, Bina, Bhopal, and Jabalpur.

=== Electricity ===
Barlan is home to a 33 kV / 11 kV substation. The village is powered almost all day.

=== Sanitation ===
Under Swachh Bharat Abhiyan, every home has indoor plumbing and a toilet. Issues with sanitation include:

- shortage of water
- no connectivity with water supply
- inconsistent plumbing

=== Education ===
Barlan has a state government school from elementary to higher secondary. Almost every child attends school. The school has water handpump.

=== Healthcare ===
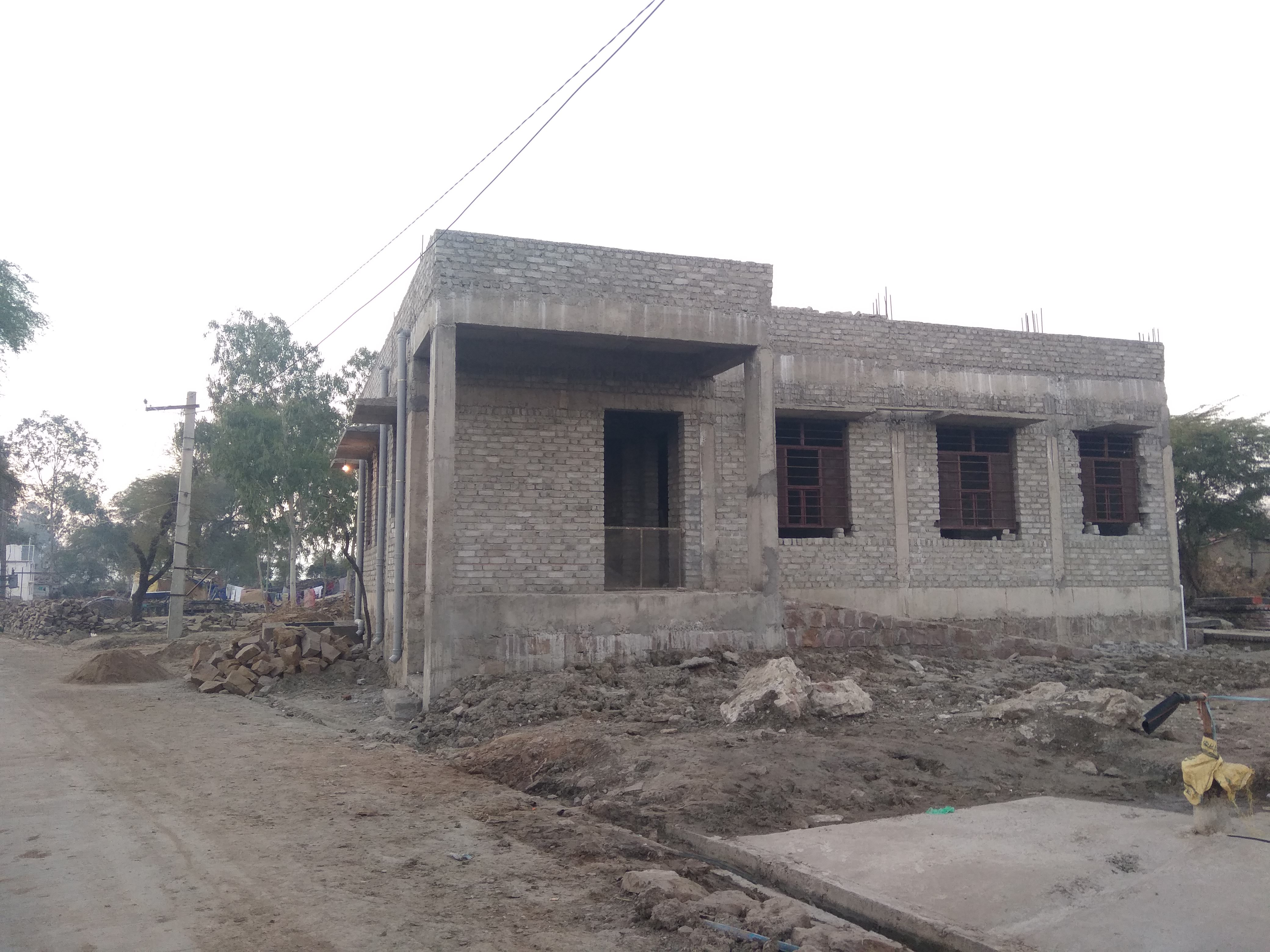
Primary Hospital

There is a primary hospital building. Adani Medicare Van also visits the village once per week.

== Notable people ==
- Nand Lal Meena former MLA from Kishanganj Constituency of Baran district

== Gallery ==
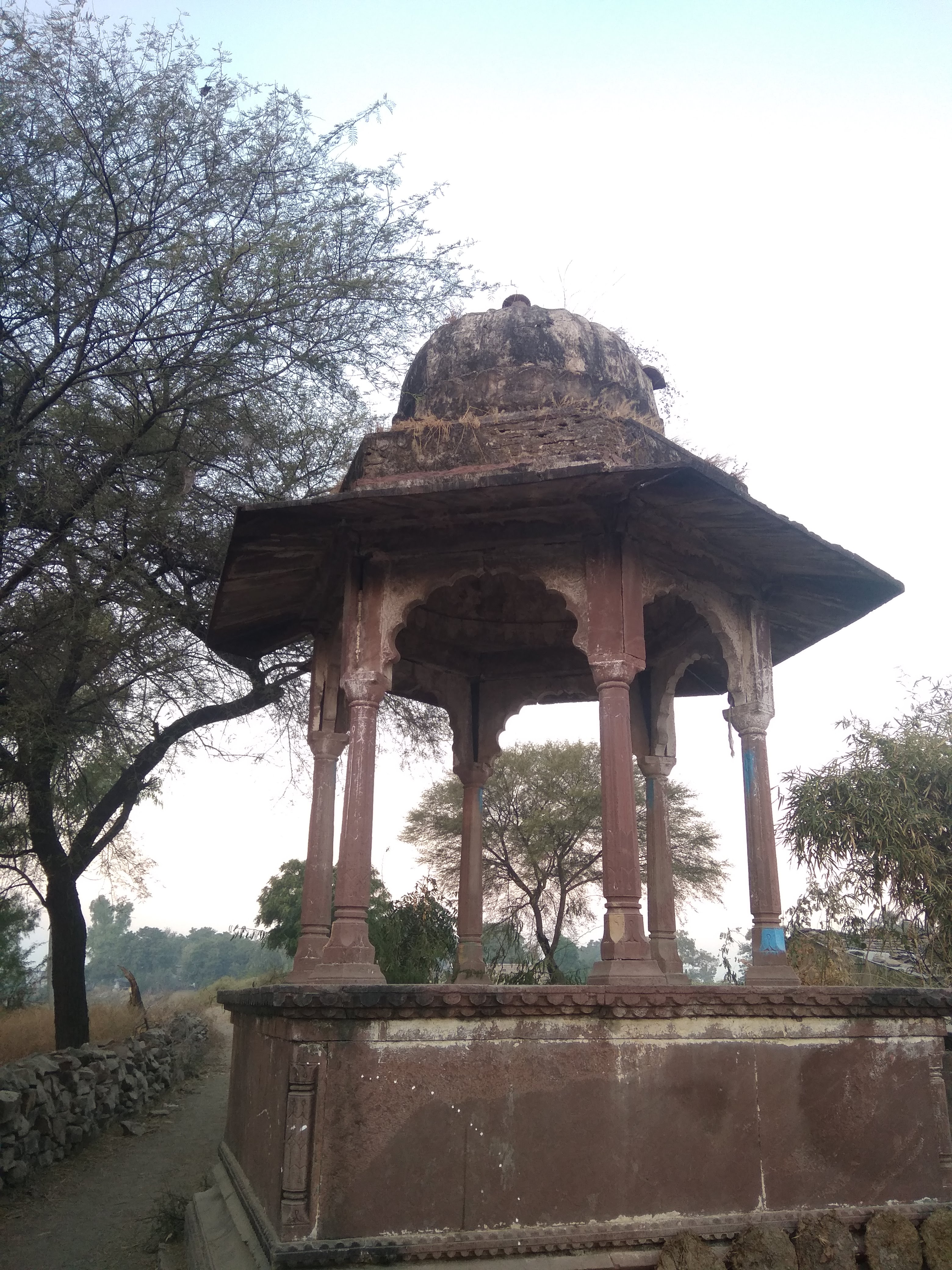
Baoli Ji ki chatri

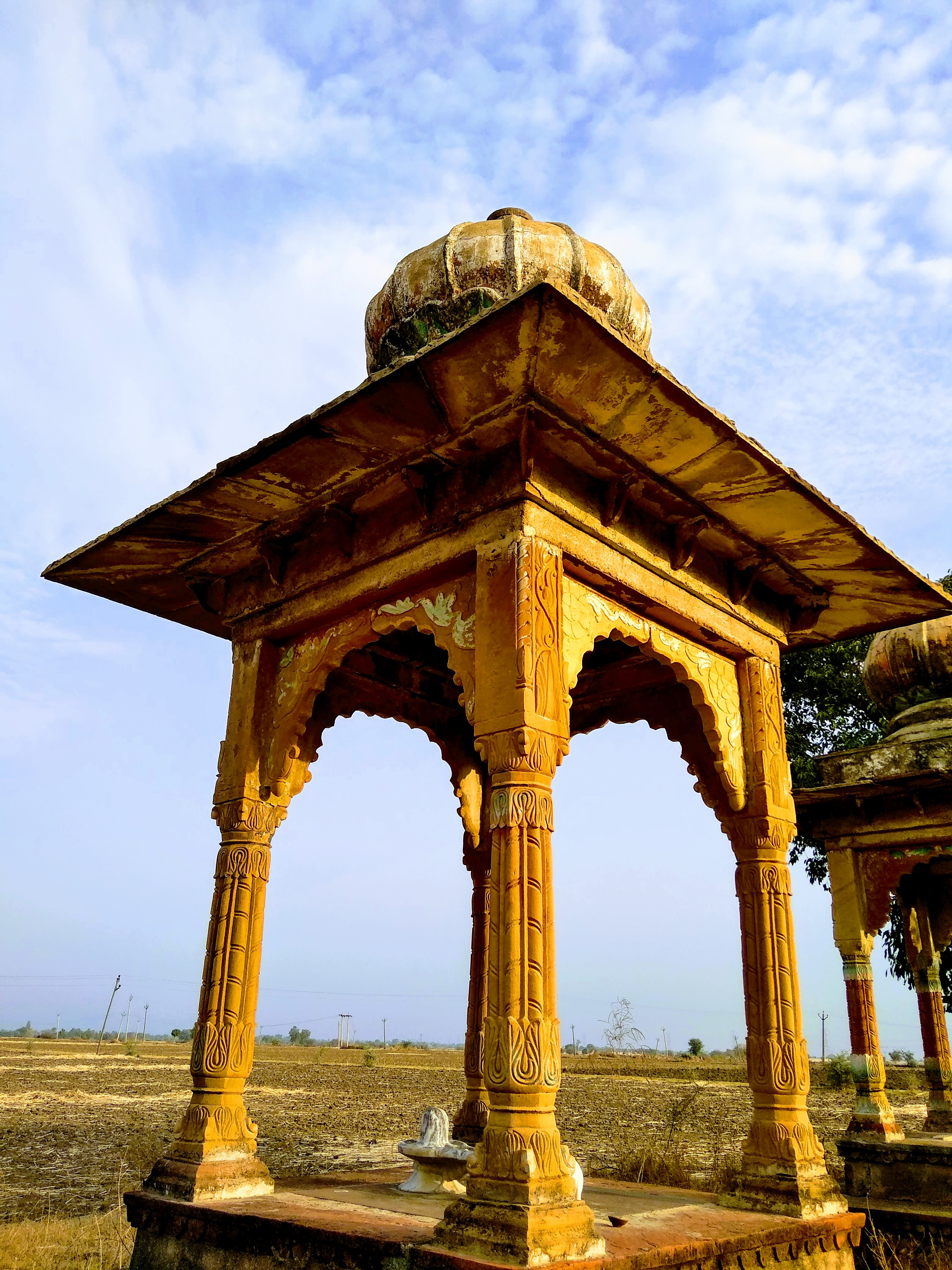
A chatri in Barlan

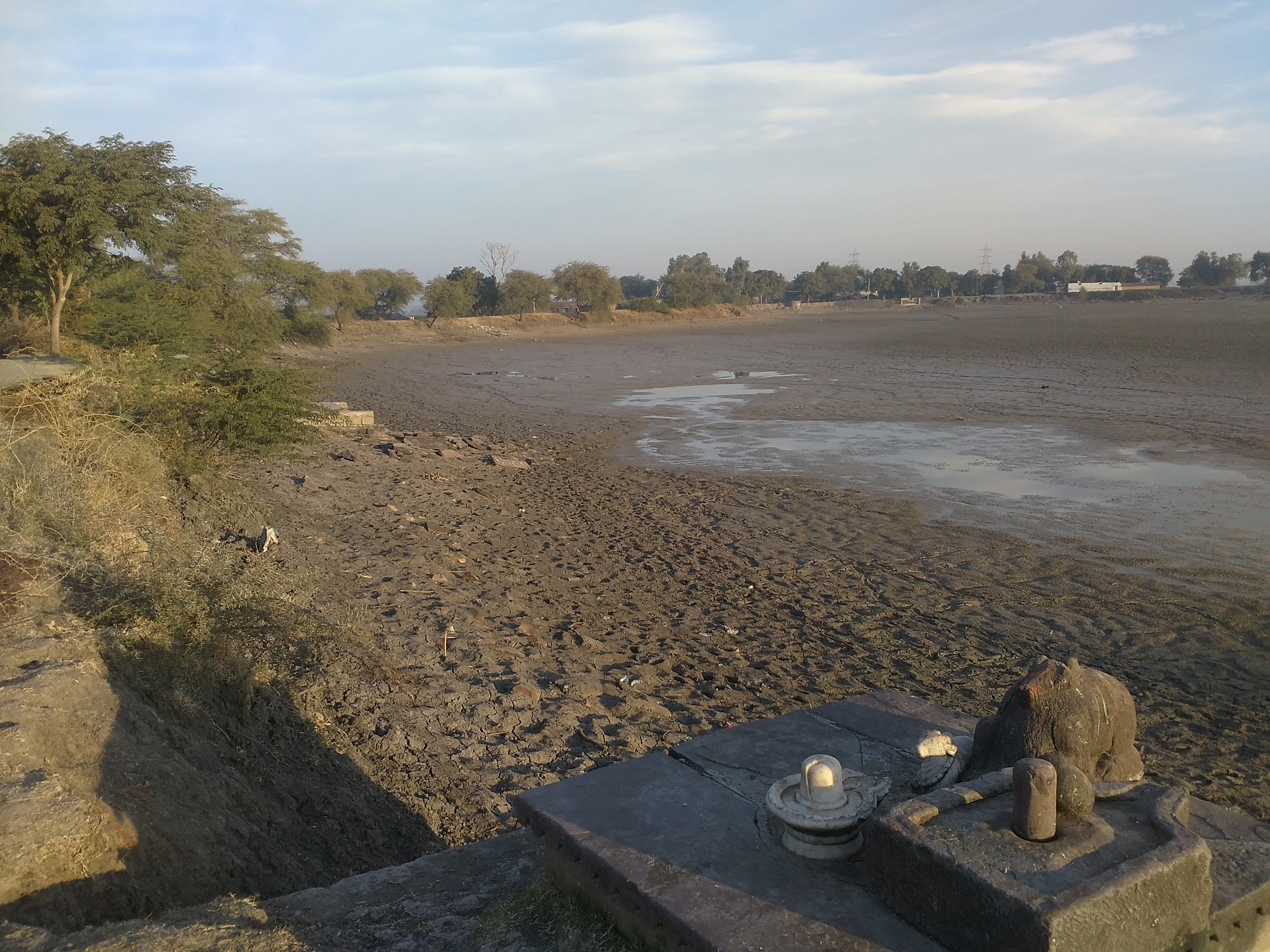
Dry pond in 2015

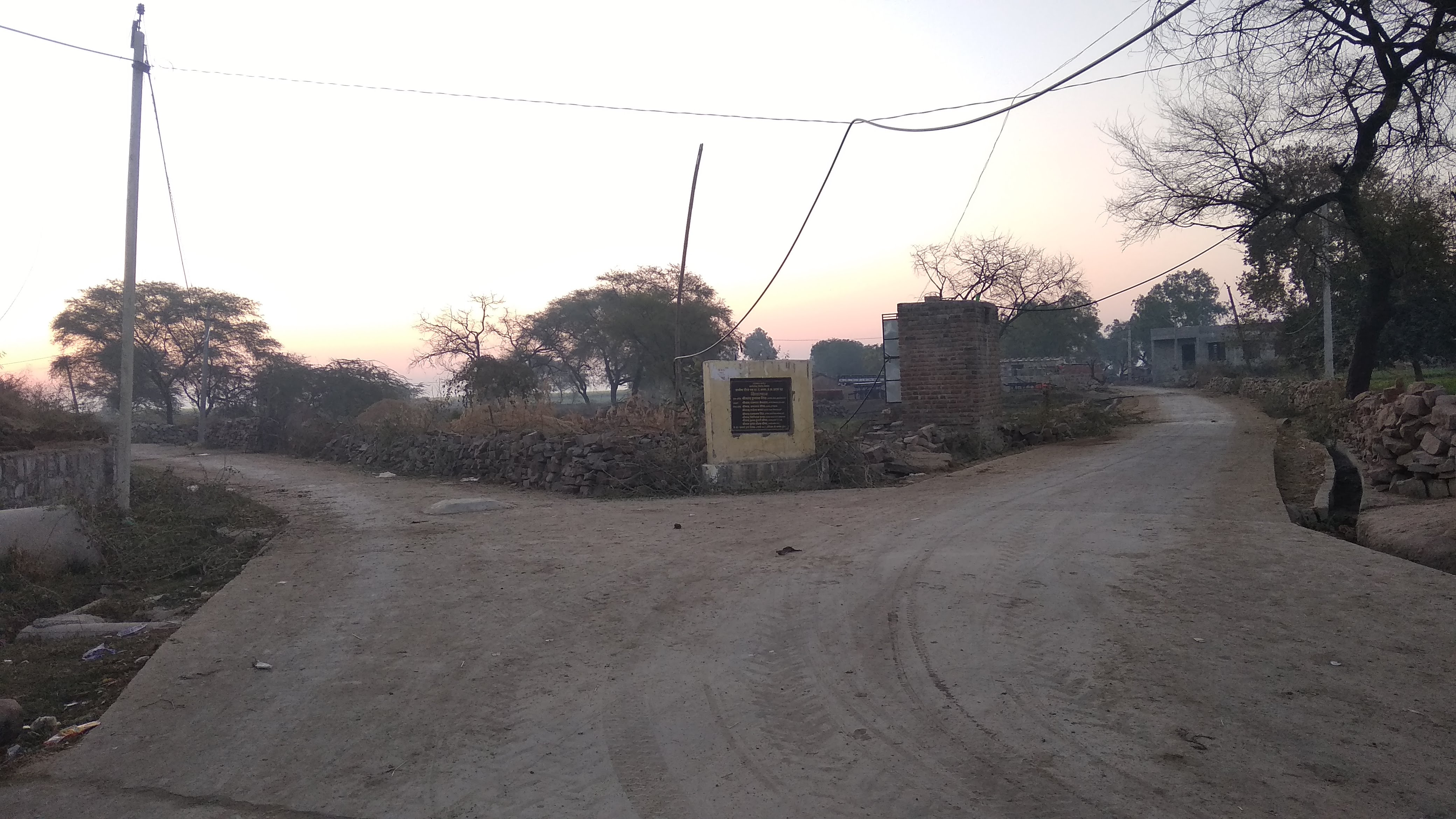
Gaurav path
