= Antana =

- Village & Gram Panchayat
- Location within Rajasthan Location within India
- Coordinates: 24.842575°N 76.620248°E
- Country: India
- State: Rajasthan
- District: Baran (Hadoti Region)

Government
  - Type: Democratic
  - Body: Gram Panchayat
  - Sarpanch: Jitendra Meghwal
  - Member of Parliament Jhalawar-Baran (Lok Sabha constituency): Dushyant Singh (BJP)
  - Member of Legislative Assembly Atru-Baran Legislative constituency: Radheshyam Bairwa (BJP)

Area
  - Total: 2 km^{2} (0.77 sq mi)
- Elevation: 289 m (948 ft)

Population (2011)
  - Total: 1,772
  - Density: 890/km^{2} (2,300/sq mi)
- Demonym: Rajasthani

Languages
  - Official: Hindi, English
  - Native: Hadoti
- Time zone: UTC+5:30 (IST)
- PIN: 325218
- Telephone code: 07451
- Sex ratio: 889 ♀/♂

Antana is village and Gram Panchayat headquarters located in the Atru Tehsil of Baran district, Rajasthan. It serves as a Gram panchayat for two villages: Antana and Musen Mata. The nearest town is Atru, which is 8 km away. It is located 32 km from the district headquarters, Baran.

== Government ==
The Antana gram panchayat administered by Sarpanch.

It is divided into various wards and each ward is represented by a ward member.

The current sarpanch of panchayat is Jitendra Meghwal

=== Past Sarpanch of Antana Gram Panchayat ===
Year/Tenure	Cateogary	Name of SARPANCH	Sex	Cateogory	Notes
2005-2010	GEN	Ashok Meena	M	ST	
2010-2015	GENW	Kali Bai	F	STW	
2015-2020	SC	Mukesh Kumar	M	SC	
2020-2026	GENW	Prem Bai	F	OBCW	
2026~present	SC	Jitendra Meghwal	M	SC	

== Population and literacy ==
As of the 2011 census, there were a total of 365 families in Antana, comprising a total population of 1772, of which 938 were men while 834 were women.

The population of children of ages 0-6 was 216, which made up 12.19% of the total population. The average sex ratio was 889, lower than the Rajasthan state average of 928. The child sex ratio was 895, higher than the Rajasthan average of 888.

In 2011, the literacy rate was 80.46%, compared to 66.11% for Rajasthan, with male literacy at 91.50%, and female literacy at 68.03%.

== Employment ==
1,021 people had jobs, with 46.52% describing their work as main work (employment or more than 6 months), while the remainder were involved in marginal activity, less than 6 months.

== Education ==
It has a Government Senior Secondary School.

== Transport ==
It is well connected to Atru Tehsil and nearby villages via road. The nearest railway station is at Atru.

== Healthcare facilities ==
There is a primary healthcare center.
