= Bhojyakheri =

- Location within Rajasthan Location within India
- Coordinates: 25°14′39″N 76°17′12″E
- Country: India
- State: Rajasthan
- Time zone: UTC+5:30 (IST)

Bhojyakheri is a town in the Indian state of Rajasthan in Northern India, located 295 kilometers (193 mi) southeast of the state capital, Jaipur, and 28 kilometers (20 mi) northwest of Baran. Bhojyakheri is located at 25°14'39.18"N 76°17'12.44"E. The town is bounded on the east, north, south by Baran district & in west by Kota district.
