= Baldara =

- Town
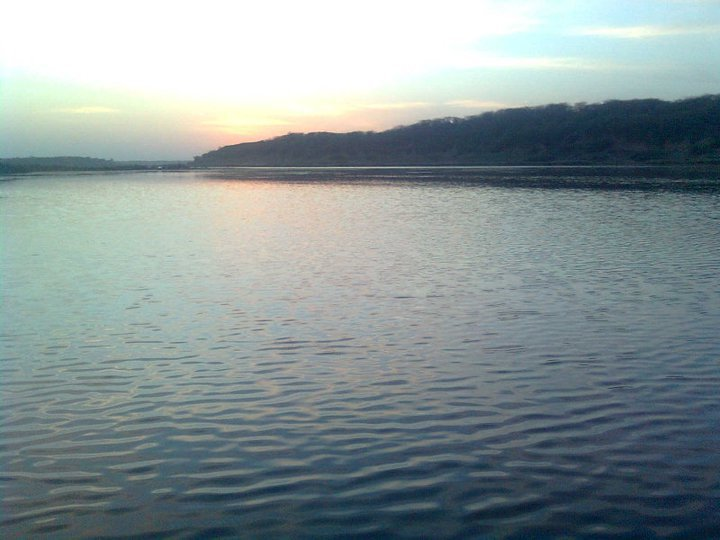
- Kali Sindh River

- Location in Rajasthan, India Baldara (India)
- Coordinates: 25.244217°N 76.286789°E
- Country: India
- State: Rajasthan
- District: Baran

Government
  - Sarpanch: Mrs. Shakila bano
  - Up-Sarpanch: Mr. Rakesh

Languages
  - Official: Hindi, Hadoti, Urdu
- Time zone: UTC+5:30 (IST)
- PIN: 325206
- Telephone code: 07457
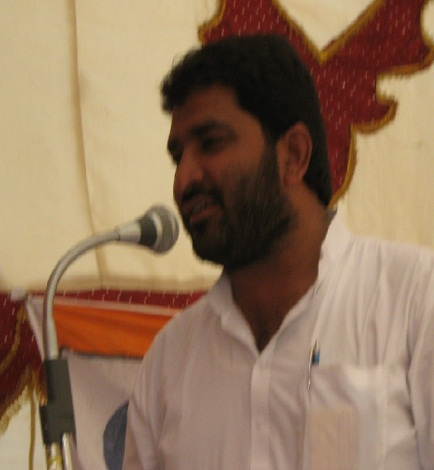
- Er. Rukhsar Ahmed Mahmoodi

Baldara is a town in western India, situated in Antah Tehsil in the state of Rajasthan. It serves as the administrative headquarters of the local Gram Panchayat. As of the 2011 census, Baldara had a population of 3,198, with a literacy rate of 76.98%. The town's residents are primarily engaged in mining operations, farming, and general labour.

== Geography ==
Baldara is located 310 kilometres (192.6 miles) southeast of the state capital, Jaipur, and 32 kilometres (19.8 miles) northwest of Baran, at coordinates 25°14'39.18"N 76°17'12.44"E. The town is bordered by the Baran district to the east, north, and south, and by the Kota district to the west.

Notable landmarks associated with Baldara include:

- Kali Sindh River: The river flows through the town.
- Majare Sharif of Hajrat Dadaji Moulvi Sb: Located in the Kabristan area of Baldara.
- Dargāh Sharīf of Hazrat Sufi Sayyed Mehmood Ali Shah Kanpuri Summa Baldari: Situated between Jagapura and Basheerpura.

=== Climate ===
Baldara experiences a tropical climate due to its proximity to the Tropic of Cancer, characterized by extremely hot summers.

The summer season in Baldara extends from April to late October or early November, with daytime temperatures averaging around 43 °C (~109 °F). Winters are relatively mild, with average temperatures ranging from a maximum of 26.7 °C (~80 °F) to a minimum of 7 °C (~44.6 °F).

The average annual rainfall in Baldara is 885.6 mm (~35.9 in.) Most rainfall comes from the southwest monsoon, beginning around the last week of June and lasting until mid-September. Pre-monsoon showers begin towards the middle of June, with post-monsoon rains occasionally occurring in October. The winter is largely dry, although some rainfall does occur as a result of the Western Disturbance passing over the region.

== Transportation ==
Transportation in Baldara is provided mostly by unmetered taxis and bus services on main roads from Kota Airport to Baran. The town is located about 12 kilometers from National Highway 27, halfway between Kota and Baran. Antah Station is the nearest railway station, located 12 kilometers from the town. It is a direct link to Kota-Beena railway line.

== Divisions ==
Baldara consists of five sub-divisions and a village:

1. Baldara
2. Roop-pura (Nayagaon)
3. Sindhpuri
4. Sindhpuri-Factori
5. Tikhod
6. Ganeshpura

Baldara is the center for FPS shops, banking, education, and a local market for essential goods. It also serves as the Panchayat headquarters for all these villages.

== Economy ==
There are some sandstone, sand, and gravel mines in the Baldara. The town is the biggest producer of sandstone & fish in the district. Garlic, mustard, and wheat are the main crops grown there.

== Other ==
Railway stations near Baldara:

- Antah (12 km)
- Kota (60 km)
- Baran (22 km)

Schools Near Baldara

- Govt. Sec. School Baldara
- Govt. Sr. Sec. School Ratadiya
- Govt. Sr. Sec. School Anta
- Kendriya Vidhyalaya NTPC Anta
- Vivek Vardhini Sr. Sec. School Baran Road Anta
- Genius Public Sr. Sec. School Baran Road Anta

Colleges Near Baldara

- Mahatma Gopal Ram Mahavidhyalya Siswali Road Anta
- Vivek Vardhini College Baran Road Anta
- Govt. ITI NTPC Road Anta
- G.N. ITI Opp. Grain Mandi Anta
- Hadoti ITI Siswali Road Anta
- Aryabhatt ITI Siswali Road Anta
