= Kharkhada Ramlothan =

Village in Rajasthan

Kharakhada Ramlothan खरखड़ा रामलोथान
- Village
- Location within Rajasthan Location within India
- Coordinates: 24.796593°N 76.628618°E
- Country: India
- State: Rajasthan
- District: Baran
- Tehsil: Atru
- Gram Panchayat: Kharakhada Ramlothan

Government
  - Type: Democratic
  - Body: Kharakhada Ramlothan Gram Panchayat
  - Sarpanch: Savitri Bai
  - Member of Parliament Jhalawar-Baran (Lok Sabha constituency): Dushyant Singh (BJP)
  - Member of Legislative Assembly Atru-Baran Legislative constituency: Radheshyam Bairwa (BJP)

Area
  - Total: 1.2 km^{2} (0.46 sq mi)
- Elevation: 289 m (948 ft)

Population (2011)
  - Total: 1,064
  - Density: 890/km^{2} (2,300/sq mi)
- Demonym: Rajasthani

Languages
  - Official: Hindi, English
  - Native: Hadoti
- Time zone: UTC+5:30 (IST)
- PIN: 325218
- Telephone code: 07451
- Sex ratio: 945 ♀/♂

Kharkhada Ramlothan is village and gram panchayat located in Atru Tehsil of Baran district, Rajasthan, India. It is a medium-sized village with a total of 209 families residing there. It comes under Atru Tehsil, which is about 18 kilometers away from Kharkhada Ramlothan.

Kharkhada Ramlothan is a village and Gram Panchayat headquarters located in the Atru Tehsil of Baran district, Rajasthan. Situated roughly 18 km from the Atru block headquarters and 47 km from Baran city, it serves as the local administrative hub for five villages: Kharakhada Ramlothan, Ummedganj, Charankheri, VyasKheri, Banpur.

== Government and administration ==
Kharakhada Ramlothan is administered as a gram panchayat under the Panchayati Raj system of Rajasthan. The local administration is headed by a Sarpanch, who serves as the elected representative and head of the village council.

The panchayat falls under the administrative jurisdiction of the Atru panchayat samiti and the Baran district. For state and national political representation, Kharakhada Ramlothan is part of the Baran-Atru Assembly constituency and the Baran-Jhalawar Lok Sabha constituency.

As of the 2026 local panchayat elections, the current Sarpanch of Kharakhada Ramlothan Gram Panchayat is Savitri Bai.

List of Ward Panch

Ward.No	Name of Village	Category of ward	Name of Candidate	Total No of Votes	Votes Polled	Poll %	Whether Elected Unoppose	Category Of Winning Candidate	Winner Votes
1	Kharkhada Ramlothan	General (Woman)	Bhawana Sen	282	270	95.74	NO	OBC	134
2	Kharkhada Ramlothan	SC	Piyush	286	272	95.1	NO	SC	127
3	Kharkhada Ramlothan	General	Mahendra Gurjar	255	0	0	YES	OBC	0
4	BANPUR	General (Woman)	NIKITA	214	204	95.33	NO	OBC (Woman)	98
5	BANPUR	General (Woman)	ANSUIYA	200	0	0	YES	OBC (Woman)	0
6	CHARANKHEDI	General	DEEPAK	403	398	98.76	NO	OBC	187
7	CHARNKHEDI	OBC	PREM NARAYAN	298	289	96.98	NO	OBC	84
8	UMMEDGANJ	ST	LOKESH	292	274	93.84	NO	ST	160
9	UMMEDGANJ	ST (Woman)	REENA	314	296	94.27	NO	ST (Woman)	134

== Sex ratio ==
In Kharkhada Ramlothan, children between the ages of 0 and 6 make up 11.09% of the total population, with a count of 118. The village's Average Sex Ratio stands at 945, which is higher than the state average of Rajasthan, which is 928. However, the child sex ratio for Kharkhada Ramlothan is 735, lower than the Rajasthan average of 888.

== Literacy ==
Kharkhada Ramlothan boasts of a higher literacy rate compared to the state average of Rajasthan. As per the 2011 census, the literacy rate of the village was 70.30%, with male literacy at 85.80% and female literacy at 54.39%.

== Population ==
According to the Population Census 2011, the village has a population of 1,064, comprising 547 males and 517 females.
