= Musen Mata =

- Village
- Location within Rajasthan Location within India
- Coordinates: 24.803554°N 76.629587°E
- Country: India
- State: Rajasthan
- District: Baran (Hadoti Region)

Government
  - Type: Democratic
  - Body: Village Under Antana Gram Panchayat
  - Sarpanch: Smt. Prembai Nagar
  - Member of Parliament Jhalawar-Baran (Lok Sabha constituency): Dushyant Singh (BJP)
  - Member of Legislative Assembly Atru-Baran Legislative constituency: Radheshyam Bairwa (BJP)

Area
  - Total: 1.5 km^{2} (0.58 sq mi)
- Elevation: 289 m (948 ft)

Population (2011)
  - Total: 872
  - Density: 580/km^{2} (1,500/sq mi)
- Demonym: Rajasthani

Languages
  - Official: Hindi, English
  - Native: Hadoti
- Time zone: UTC+5:30 (IST)
- PIN: 325218
- Telephone code: 07451
- Sex ratio: 931 ♀/♂

Musen Mata is a village of Atru tehsil in the Baran district, in Rajasthan, India. The nearest town is Atru, which is 11 km away. It is located 46 km from the district headquarter, Baran. Its population is 892. It comes under Antana Gram Panchayat.

== Population ==
The Musen Mata Village located in Atru Tehsil, 892 People are living in this Village, 462 are males and 430 are females as per 2011 census. Expected Musen Mata population 2021/2022 is between 874 and 999. Literate people are 611 out of 370 are male and 241 are female. People living in Musen Mata depend on multiple skills, total workers are 443 out of which men are 230 and women are 213. Total 354 Cultivators are depended on agriculture farming out of 186 are cultivated by men and 168 are women. 24 people works in agricultural land as a labour in Musen Mata, men are 15 and 9 are women.

== Geographicy ==
It is situated on the Bhupasi River. The cartographic coordinates are 24.803554°N 76.629587°E. According to census data from 2011, the area of the village is 469.08 hectares.
