= Ummedganj =

Village in Rajasthan

Ummedganj उम्मेदगंज
- Village
- Location within Rajasthan Location within India
- Coordinates: 24.796593°N 76.628618°E
- Country: India
- State: Rajasthan
- District: Baran
- Tehsil: Atru
- Gram Panchayat: Kharakhada Ramlothan

Government
  - Type: Democratic
  - Body: Kharakhada Ramlothan Gram Panchayat
  - Sarpanch: Savitri Bai
  - Member of Parliament Jhalawar-Baran (Lok Sabha constituency): Dushyant Singh (BJP)
  - Member of Legislative Assembly Atru-Baran Legislative constituency: Radheshyam Bairwa (BJP)

Area
  - Total: 1.2 km^{2} (0.46 sq mi)
- Elevation: 289 m (948 ft)

Population (2011)
  - Total: 761
  - Density: 630/km^{2} (1,600/sq mi)
- Demonym: Rajasthani

Languages
  - Official: Hindi, English
  - Native: Hadoti
- Time zone: UTC+5:30 (IST)
- PIN: 325218
- Telephone code: 07451
- Sex ratio: 860 ♀/♂

Ummedganj is a village in the Atru tehsil of the Baran district in Rajasthan state, India. It is a small village and have only 761 inhabitants (2011 Census).

It comes under Kharakhada Ramlothan Gram Panchayat. In the village, there is an upper primary school and a small health care center.

Ummedganj

== Agriculture ==
The village is highly dependent on agricultural activities. People in the village raise livestock like buffalos, cows, and goats. Every household owns land, but farming is difficult without significant resources. Some farmers have larger farms than others, so there is an unequal distribution of land. The input cost for plowing, sowing, maintenance, irrigation, and harvesting are very high. Most of the small farmers do not have their own water resources, so they have to obtain water from other farmers for their crop. To alleviate the economic burden of the land, small farmers often rent their land to big farmers.

== Employment ==
According to the 2011 census data, the overall literacy rate in Ummedganj is 67%. Of the total population, 416 were engaged in work activities. 46.63% of workers describe their work as Main Work (Employment or Earning more than 6 Months), while 53.37% were involved in Marginal activity such as NREGA, providing a livelihood for less than 6 months. Of 416 workers engaged in Main Work, 126 were cultivators (owner or co-owner) while 46 were agricultural labourers. Some people of the village are also employed by the government.

== Education ==
Ummedganj has an upper primary government school. Almost every child attends school. The school has a hand pump, a tubewell, and a large water tank for drinking water. There are five classrooms, one library, one office, and one kitchen. There are also separate washrooms for students. The school is situated on Musen Mata Road. The school has electricity. There are 6 teachers.

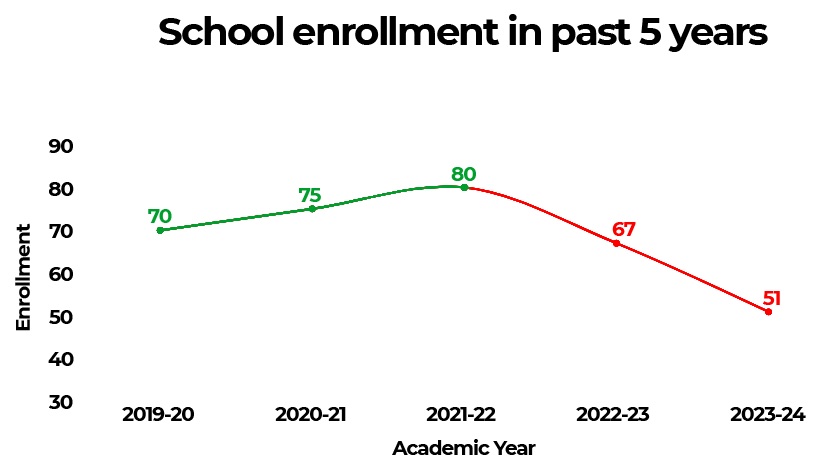
School student enrollment in last 5 years

== Transport ==
The village is connected by road to Atru, Tehsil, and other nearby villages. The roads were built according to Pradhan Mantri Gramin Sadak Yojna, a plan created by Central Government.

== Geographical information ==
Ummedganj is located between the Bhupasi River and the Balukhal River in the southern part of Rajasthan. The cartographic coordinates are 24.796593°N 76.628618°E. According to census data from 2011, the area of the village is 295.07 hectares.

== Households and population ==
There are about 150 families in the village. Ummedganj has a population of 761, of which 409 are males while 352 are females, according to Population Census 2011.

In Ummedganj, the population of children ages 0–6 is 110, which makes up 14.45% of the total population of the village. The average sex ratio of Ummedganj is 861, which is lower than Rajasthan's state average of 928. The child sex ratio for Ummedganj is 964, higher than Rajasthan's average of 888.

== Literacy rate ==
Ummedganj has a higher literacy rate compared to Rajasthan. In 2011, the literacy rate of Ummedganj was 68.36%, compared to 66.11% in Rajasthan. In Ummedganj, male literacy stands at 86.40%, while the female literacy rate is 46.98%.

== Religious places ==
There are two temples in this village. One temple is of Radha Krishna, which was inaugurated the year 1996. The second temple is of Lord Hanuman. There are platforms of many Hindu deities in the village.

== COVID-19 outbreak ==
COVID-19 spread in the village in June 2021. A large number of people in the village tested positive for the virus. District Magistrate & Collector Rajendra Vijay issued prohibitory orders declaring the entire periphery area of Ummedganj a micro-containment zone to prevent the spread of the novel coronavirus. This order was effective until 12 midnight on 21 June 2021.

== Alcohol addiction in the village ==
Many people of the village are addicted to alcohol. Most of them include youth. Due to this alcohol addiction, the family condition of the alcoholic in the village is also bad due to which small children are adversely affected. Motor cycle accidents of alcoholics keep happening in the village frequently. Sometimes these alcoholics have even died due to excessive drinking.
