= Ma Ambika Mandir, Musen Mata =

- Location in, Rajasthan Ma Ambika Mandir, Musen Mata (India)

Religion
- Affiliation: Hinduism
- District: Baran

Location
- Location: Musen Mata
- State: Rajasthan
- Country: India
- Interactive map of Ma Ambika Mandir, Musen Mata
- Coordinates: 24.8010695°N 76.6373779°E

Ma Ambika Mandir (locally also known as Mata Ji Mandir or Musen Ki Mata Ji) is a Hindu temple located in the village of Musen Mata, about 50 km south of Baran in the state of Rajasthan, India. Ma Ambika, a form of Goddess Durga, is the presiding deity of the temple. Ma Ambika Mandir is situated on the banks of Bhupasi River. This temple is situated in the middle of a forest. It is forbidden to encroach on this forest. Even wood cannot be cut in this forest. The temple is known for its architecture and serene surroundings.

== Overview ==
The temple of Ma Ambika Mandir is well known in southeast part of Rajasthan. It is believed that a person who is suffering from diseases get relief by visiting Ambika Mata. Monday is the busiest day in the temple because Monday is the day of Ma Ambika. Large numbers of devotees visit every Monday. Mass feasts are often organized here by the devotees. People of all age groups come to the court of Mother Ambika to make their wish. Here the mother seeks the blessings of a government job for her sons. Aarti is held here every morning and evening. There is a pool here and a tube well for bathing. Shops are set up here for worship material. A lovely river is flowing nearby. Devotees believe that praying at the Ma Ambika Temple can bring them good fortune, health, and happiness.

Ma Ambika Temple is a religious and cultural landmark in Rajasthan.

== Legend and history ==
There is a legend about the history of this temple that this village was known as Kundanpur during the Mahabharata period. Where the king was Bhishmak, his son Rukmi had arranged the marriage of sister Rukani with the wicked Shishupala. But Rukmani ji loved Shri Krishna very much in her heart. On the other hand, Rukmi had made an umbrella of eight pillars for the marriage mandap in preparation for the marriage of Rukmani. Which is still situated in the khaliyani of Kundi. Amidst the sound of shehnais in the house of King Bhishmak, Rukmani came Musen Mata to worship Ambika, From where Lord Krishna married him through Gandharva and took him to the Vidarbha region of Maharashtra. Later Shri Krishna also cut off Shishupala's head.

The Musen Mata Temple itself is a symbol of ancient glory, and this temple needs no introduction. Musen Mata is the only place in the whole of India where there is an idol of love. Here seven mothers are present on the same rock. There are many legends about the appearance of the goddess. Hanuman statues have been installed on the northern side of the temple and Ganesha on the south. Ancient bricks and tall pots are also found in the excavation near the temple of Musen Mata. Whose measurement is of 12/4 and 5/3 which are like bricks found from excavation in Kalibanga and Quetta province of Pakistan.

== Forest and animals ==
A large number of monkeys are found here. They do not harm to visitors, pilgrims and devotees. Butea monosperma, acacia, and neem trees are found here.

== Fair ==
Every year a fair is held in the month of April, which lasts about a month. Domestic animals like bulls, cows and their calves are sold in this fair. It is the largest cattle fair in the Baran district.

== Gallery ==
The temple features many statues of god, goddess and lions.
