= Deelod Hathi =

Deelod Hathi is village and gram panchayat located in Atru Tehsil of Baran district, Rajasthan, India. It is a medium-sized village with a total of 209 families residing there. It comes under Atru Tehsil, which is about 20 kilometers away from Deelod Hathi.

The village is administrated by a Sarpanch, who is an elected representative of the village, as per the Constitution of India and the Panchyati Raaj Act.
