= Parban Dam Project =

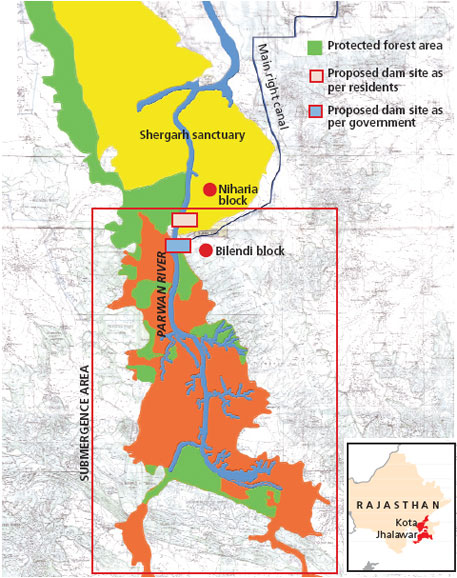
- Parban Dam Jhalawar

- Parban Dam Project in Jhalawar district, Rajasthan
- Official name: Parban Dam Project
- Location: Jhalawar district, Rajasthan, India
- Coordinates: 24.62°0′N 76.51°0′E
- Purpose: Irrigation Water, Drinking Water, Industrial Water
- Construction began: 2017
- Construction cost: ₹672.99 crore in 2017
- Owners: Water Resource Department, Government of Rajasthan

Dam and spillways
- Type of dam: Concrete gravity
- Impounds: Parban River
- Height: 124.672 ft (38.000 m)
- Length: 1,181.1 ft (360.0 m)

Reservoir
- Creates: Parban Dam
- Website india-wris.nrsc.gov.in

Parban Dam Project (परवन परियोजना) is an under construction dam project on the Parban River in the Jhalawar District of Rajasthan. Construction began in December 2017, after receiving approval by then Chief Minister Vasundhara Raje.

The dam to be built 120 km from Kota town in Akawad village of Jhalawar district was likely to submerge 10,000 hectares (ha), including more than 1,600 ha of forestland. The union Ministry of Environment and Forests (MoEF) granted environmental clearance to the project in November, 2011. The clearance letter states the dam will completely submerge 17 villages and partially inundate 30 villages, affecting over 3,000 families including 461 tribal families.
The dam capacity of this project is 490 million cubic metre. After completion, 317 million cubic metres of water will be available for irrigation. Along with irrigation, this project will also provide 50 million cubic metres of water to quench thirst of 1,821 villages of Baran, Jhalawar and Kota districts. The thermal power generation of 2,970 MW will be achieved with 79 million cubic metre of the project.

== History ==
Since long before 1980 people of the Baran and Jhalawar were demanding a river canal for agriculture. There were many peaceful demonstration on many occasion on different places. Since the 2014 political parties started to accuse each other for ignoring peoples long time demand after many ups and down dream project came to limelight in political scenario. Many local leaders and old leaders like Ex. MLA Nandlal Meena submit demand letter for dam to CM Vasundhara Raje. To make Parban Water Project a National Project of India in October 2016 CM Raje went delhi to meet Union Minister Uma Bharti. On 15 December 2017 Raje laid the foundation stone of the Parwan Dam Project.

== Investment ==
Hindustan Construction Company, HCC as a lead partner in the joint venture with HSEPL has been awarded Rs 672.99 crore contract on Engineering Procurement Construction (EPC) basis for the construction of Parwan Gravity Dam by the Water Resources Department of the Rajasthan government. HCC's share in the JV is 90% or around Rs 605.70 crore.

== Construction ==
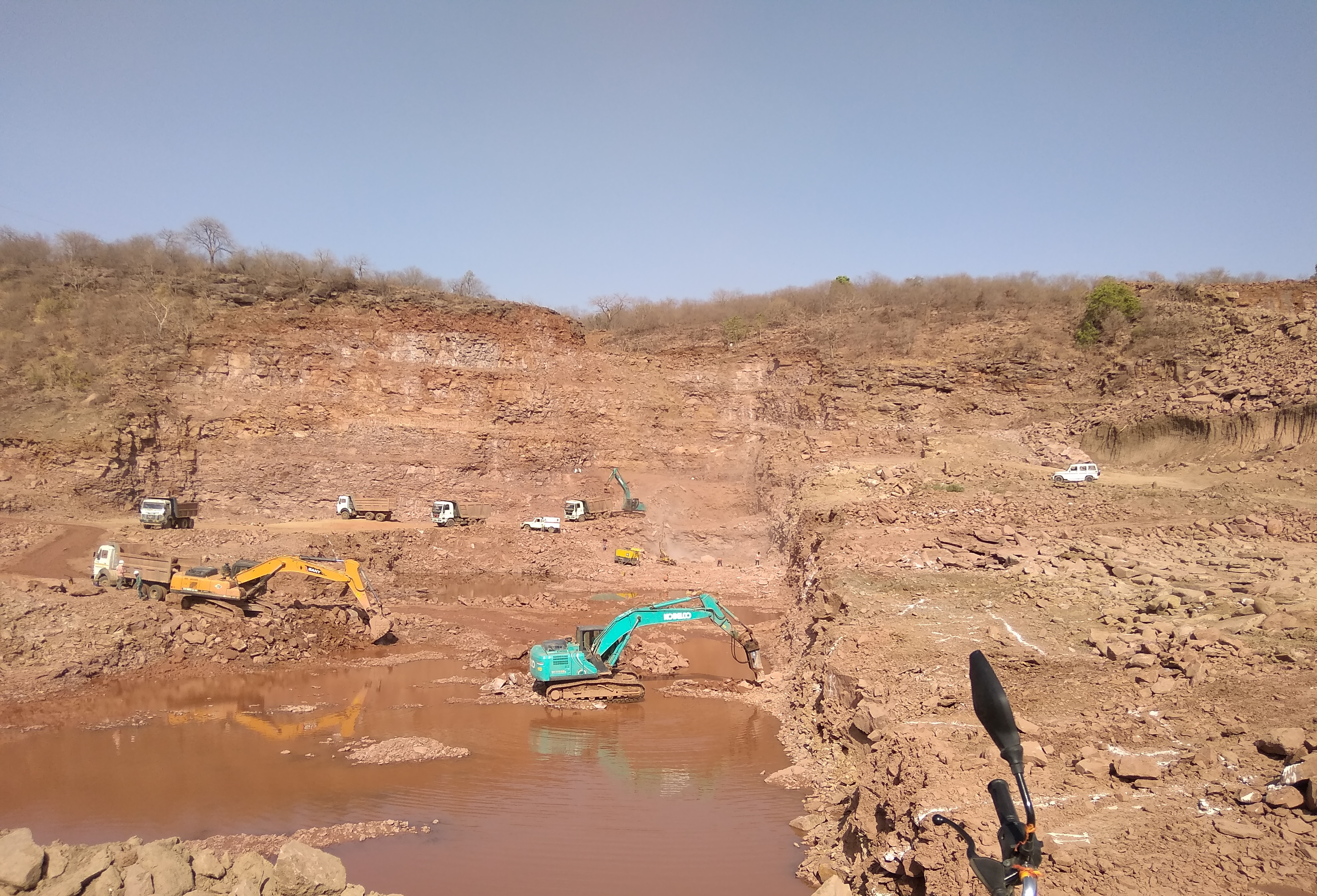
Under construction akawad dam April 2018

Construction of Dam started in December 2018. The completion of the dam expected around May 2021.

== Land Acquisition, Displacement and Resettlement ==
Most of the residential areas in the two districts Baran and Jhalawar are on a hillock, while the agricultural land is at a lower altitude. Due to this situation some villages are categorised as partially submerged while their fields and roads are fully inundate.

The land for re-location has been identified at two-three places near Atru.

== Environmental issues and Historical Sites ==
The dam is likely to submerge 10,000 hectares (ha), including more than 1,600 ha of forestland. The state government says the dam will completely submerge 17 villages and partially inundate 30 villages. Residents allege that the government’s definition of complete submergence is skewed. Besides submerging villages, the project will affect religious places of heritage value. For example, Kakoni, the eighth century temple in Baran, which was declared protected by the state archaeological department in 1970.
