= Pratap Singh Singhvi =

Indian politician

Member of Rajasthan Legislative Assembly
- Incumbent
- Assumed office 2013
- Preceded by: Karan Singh
- Constituency: Chhabra
- In office 1993–2008
- Preceded by: Bhairon Singh Shekhawat
- Succeeded by: Karan Singh
- Constituency: Chhabra

Personal details
- Born: 18 February 1957 (age 69) Chhipabarod, Baran District, Rajasthan, India
- Party: Bhartiya Janta Party
- Occupation: Politician

Pratap Singh Singhvi (born 18 February 1957) is an Indian politician currently serving as a member of Rajasthan Legislative Assembly, representing the Chhabra Assembly constituency as a member of the Bhartiya Janta Party.

Following the 2023 Rajasthan Legislative Assembly election, he was elected as an MLA from the Chhabra Assembly constituency, defeating Karan Singh, the candidate from the Indian National Congress (INC), by a margin of 5,108 votes.
