= Mothpur =

Coordinates: 24°44′29″N 76°37′13″E

Mothpur is a village and gram panchayat located in Atru Tehsil of Baran district, Rajasthan, India. Mothpur is a medium-sized village with a total of 851 families residing there. It comes under Atru Tehsil, which is about 22 kilometers away from Mothpur.

== Population ==
Mothpur village has a population of 4497, according to the Population Census of 2011; 2332 men and 2165 women.
