= Nand Lal Meena (born 1936) =

Indian politician

Nand Lal Meena is former MLA from Kishanganj Constituency of Baran district Rajasthan. Born in 1936 in village Barlan, he graduated from Rajasthan University. He joined the Bharatiya Jana Sangh. He was later elected MLA (1967–1972) from Kishanganj Constituency of Rajasthan.
