= Shahabad, Baran =

Village in Rajasthan, India

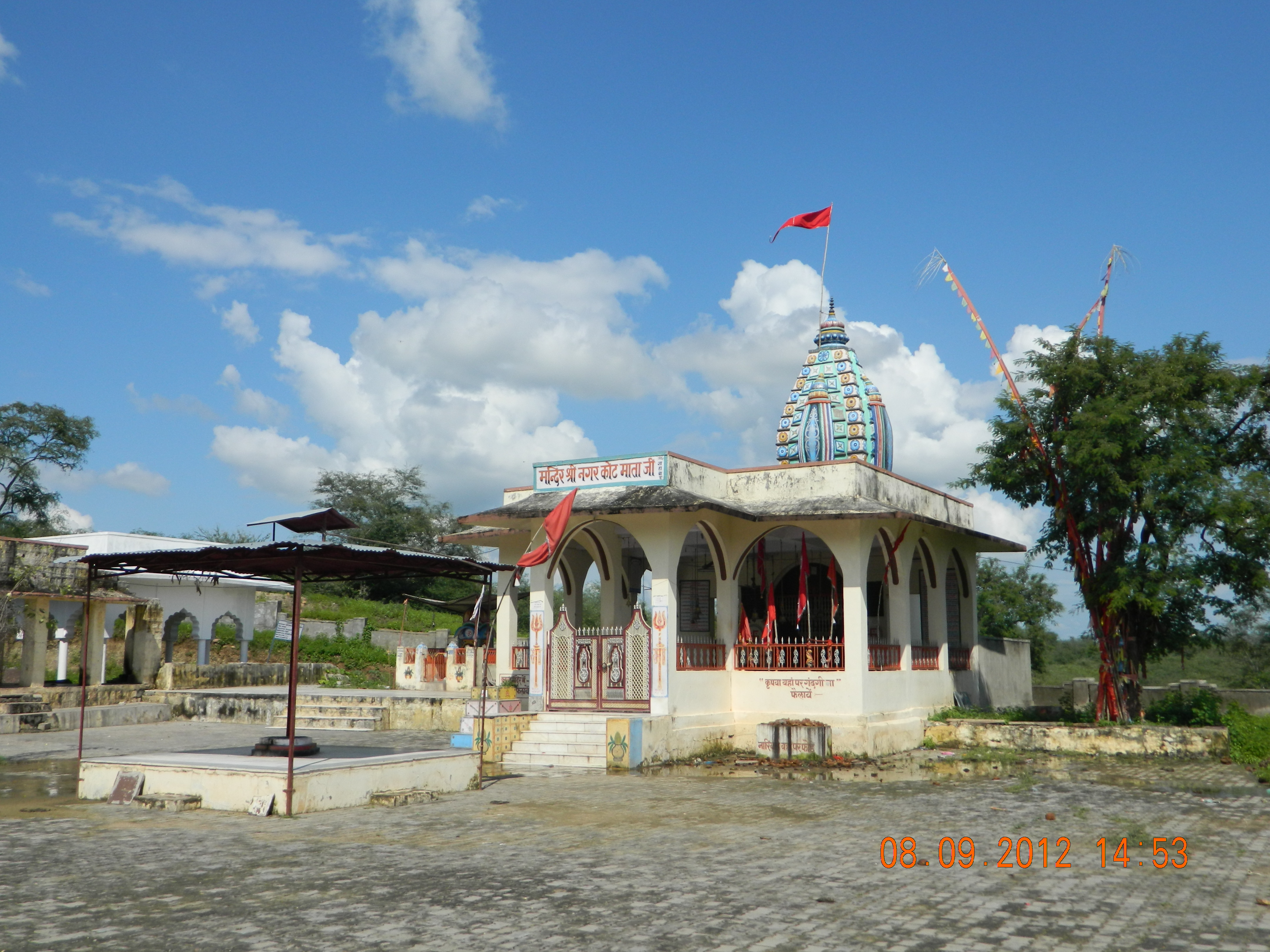
Nagarkot Mataji

Shahabad is a town and a tehsil headquarter in Baran District of Rajasthan in India. The pin code for Shahabad is 325217. As per the 2011 Census of India, Shahabad town has population of 3,445 of which 1,795 are males while 1,650 are females.

Shahabad is 80 km away from Baran and 75 km away from Shivpuri. There some interesting places to visit like, Bala Fort, Nagarkot Mata mandir ets.
