= Salpura railway station =

Railway station in Rajasthan, India

Salpura

General information
- Location: Salpura, Baran district, Rajasthan; India
- Coordinates: 24.770287°N 76.734253°E
- System: Indian Railways station
- Owner: Indian Railways
- Operator: West Central Railway
- Line: Kota–Ruthiyai line
- Platforms: 1
- Tracks: 1

Construction
- Structure type: Standard (on ground station)
- Parking: Yes

Other information
- Status: Functioning
- Station code: SYL
- Zone(s): West Central Railway
- Division(s): Kota
Location
- Location within India Location within Rajasthan

Salpura railway station is a railway station in Baran district, Rajasthan. Its code is SYL. It serves Salpura village. The station consists of a single platform. Passenger and Express trains halt here.
