= Anta Thermal Power Station =

Anta TPS
- Country: India
- Location: Antah, Baran district, Rajasthan
- Coordinates: 25°11′2″N 76°19′10″E
- Status: Operational
- Owner: NTPC
- Operator: NTPC Limited

Thermal power station
- Primary fuel: Natural gas
- Cooling source: Chambal River
- Combined cycle?: Yes

Power generation
- Units operational: 3 × 89 MW; 1 × 153 MW
- Nameplate capacity: 420 MW

NTPC Anta is a natural gas-fired power station located in Baran district in the Indian state of Rajasthan. It is one of the power plants of NTPC. The gas for it is sourced from GAIL HBJ Pipeline - South Basin Gas Field, and its source of water is the Right Canal of Chambal River.

== Capacity ==
Stage	Unit number	Installed capacity (MW)	Date of commissioning	GT / ST
1st	1	88.7	1989 January	GT
1st	2	88.7	1989 March	GT
1st	3	88.7	1989 May	GT
1st	4	153.2	1990 March	ST
Total	Four	419.3		
