= Samraniya =

- Town
- Location within Rajasthan Location within India
- Coordinates: 25.14363°N 77.00609°E
- Country: India
- State: Rajasthan
- District: Baran
- Tehsil: Shahabad

Population (2011)
  - Total: 4,339

Languages
  - Official: Hindi, English
  - Native: Rajasthani, Harauti, Khari Boli Hindi, Braj Bhasha
- Time zone: UTC+5:30 (IST)
- PIN: 325217
- Telephone code: 07460

Samraniya is a town located in Shahabad tehsil (block) of Baran district in Rajasthan, India.

== Demographics ==
According to Population Census 2011, there are 859 families residing in the town, And the population of the town is 4,339 of which 2,218 are males and 2,121 are females.
