= Chhabra Assembly constituency =

Legislative Assembly constituency in Rajasthan State, India

Coordinates: 24.66°N 76.85°E

Chhabra
- Constituency No. 196 for the Rajasthan Legislative Assembly

Constituency details
- Country: India
- Region: North India
- State: Rajasthan
- District: Baran
- Lok Sabha constituency: Jhalawar–Baran
- Established: 1951
- Total electors: 244,570
- Reservation: None

Member of Legislative Assembly
- 16th Rajasthan Legislative Assembly
- Incumbent Pratap Singh Singhvi
- Party: Bharatiya Janata Party
- Elected year: 2023

Chhabra Assembly constituency is one of the 200 Legislative Assembly constituencies of Rajasthan state in India. It is in Baran district and is a segment of Jhalawar–Baran Lok Sabha constituency.

== Members of Assembly ==
Rajasthan Legislative Assembly
Year	Member	Party
1952	Ved Pal Tayagi	Indian National Congress
1977	Prem Singh	Janata Party
1977(bypoll)	Bhairon Singh Shekhawat	Janata Party
1980	Bhairon Singh Shekhawat	Bharatiya Janata Party
1985	Pratap Singh	Bharatiya Janata Party
1990	Bhairon Singh Shekhawat	Bharatiya Janata Party
1993	Pratap Singh Singhvi	Bharatiya Janata Party
1998	Pratap Singh Singhvi	Bharatiya Janata Party
2003	Pratap Singh Singhvi	Bharatiya Janata Party
2008	Karan Singh	Indian National Congress
2013	Pratap Singh Singhvi	Bharatiya Janata Party
2018	Pratap Singh Singhvi	Bharatiya Janata Party
2023	Pratap Singh Singhvi	Bharatiya Janata Party

== Election results ==
=== 2023 ===
2023 Rajasthan Legislative Assembly election: Chhabra
Party	Candidate	Votes	%	±%
BJP	Pratap Singh Singhvi	65,000	32.73	▼11.43
INC	Karan Singh Rathore	59,892	30.16	▼11.93
Independent	Naresh Meena	43,921	22.12	
Independent	Upendra Kumar	13,386	6.74	
Independent	Gopal Bajara	4,167	2.1	
AAP	Giriraj Prasad Meena	2,918	1.47	
Independent	Jaynrayan	2,115	1.07	
NOTA	None of the above	3,101	1.56	▼0.29
Majority		5,108	2.57	▲0.5
Turnout		198,583	81.2	▲1.38
BJP hold		Swing	▲0.50	

=== 2018 ===
2018 Rajasthan Legislative Assembly election: Chhabra
Party	Candidate	Votes	%	±%
BJP	Pratap Singh Singhvi	79,707	44.16	
INC	Karan Singh Rathore	75,963	42.09	
Independent	Veerbhadra Singh	14,252	7.9	
BSP	Rekha Rani	2,796	1.55	
NOTA	None of the above	3,343	1.85	
Majority		3,744	2.07	
Turnout		180,486	79.82	
BJP hold		Swing	▼37.31	

=== 2013 ===
2013 Rajasthan Legislative Assembly election: Chhabra
Party	Candidate	Votes	%	±%
BJP	Pratap Singh Singhvi	88,193	56.58%	+14.92%
NPP	Mansingh Dhanoriya	26,808	17.20%	N/A
INC	Prakashchand Nagar	25,350	16.26%	−29.85%
NOTA	None of the Above	3,315	2.15%	+2.15%
BSP	Bhanwar Singh	2,467	1.58%	−0.04%
Independent	Radheshyam Meena	1,812	1.16%	N/A
Majority		61,385	39.38%	+33.93%
Turnout		1,55,879	81.46%	+5.53%
BJP gain from INC		Swing	▲39.38	

=== 2008 ===
2008 Rajasthan Legislative Assembly election: Chhabra
Party	Candidate	Votes	%	±%
INC	Karan Singh Rathore	58,771	46.11%	−0.21%
BJP	Pratap Singh Singhvi	51,823	40.66%	−7.02%
Independent	Devaki Nandan	9,828	7.71%	N/A
Independent	Lal Singh Maran	3,190	2.50%	N/A
BSP	Rafees Ahmad	2,069	1.62%	N/A
BJSH	Prahalad	1,773	1.39%	N/A
Majority		6,948	5.45%	+4.09%
Turnout		1,27,454	75.53%	+6.37%
INC gain from BJP		Swing	▲5.45	

== See also ==
- List of constituencies of the Rajasthan Legislative Assembly
- Baran district
