= Atru tehsil =

Municipality in Rajasthan, India

Atru tehsil is a tehsil of Baran district in the state of Rajasthan, in India. The headquarters of the tehsil is located in the town of Atru.
