= Bhand Deva Temple =

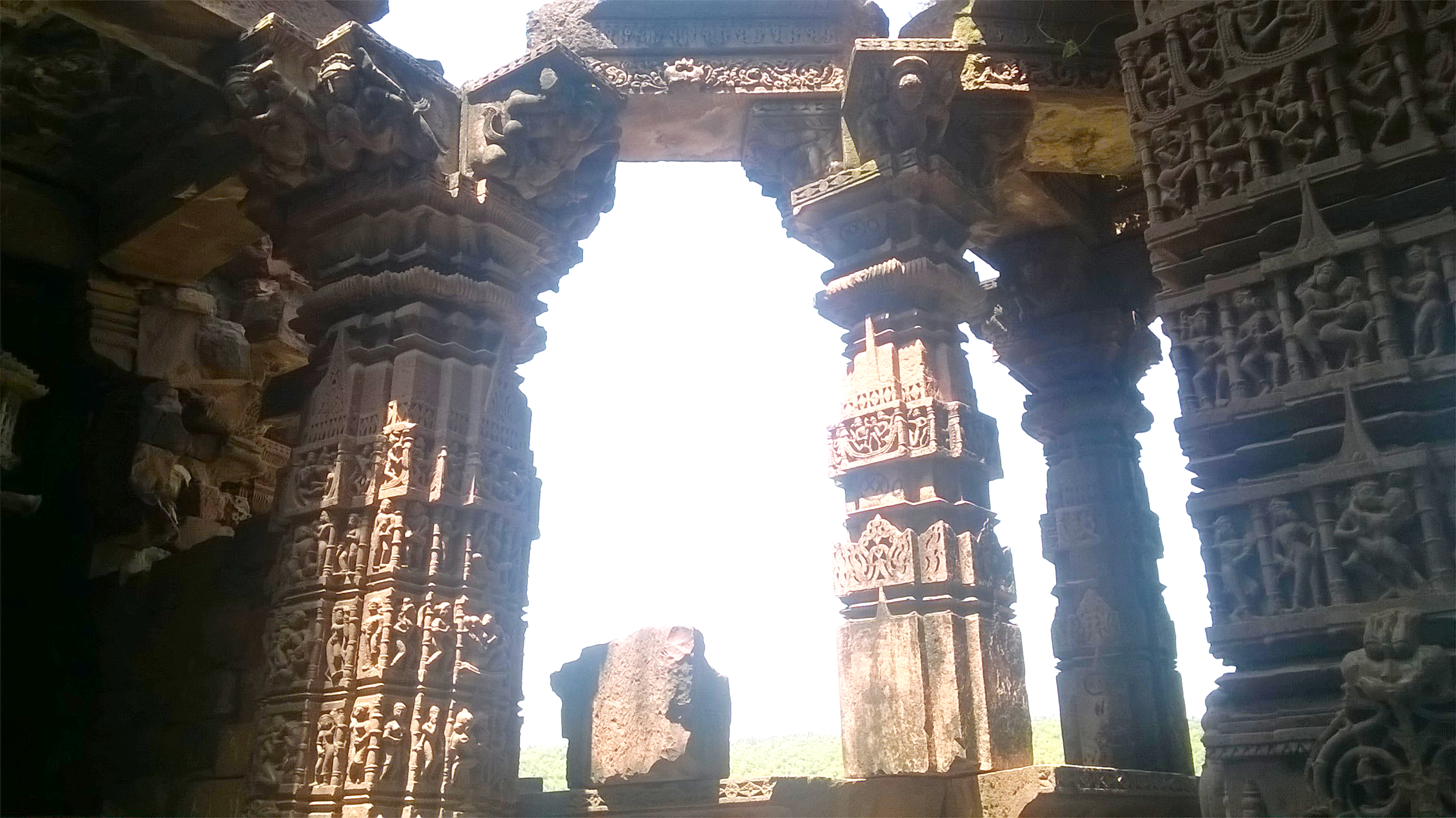

- Location in Rajasthan

Religion
- Affiliation: Hinduism
- District: Baran district
- Deity: Shiva
- Festival: Kartik Poornima

Location
- State: Rajasthan
- Country: India
- Interactive map of Bhand Deva Temple
- Coordinates: 25°20′0″N 76°37′27″E

Architecture
- Type: Khajuraho style

Bhand Deva Temple or Bhand Devara Temple, also known as Little Khajuraho as the 18th century main Hindu temple is built in the style of Khajuraho Group of Monuments, is a temple complex with one main shiva temple and two cave temples further uphill. It is on the banks of a meteor impact crater lake inside the 4 km wide Ramgarh crater about 40 km from the city of Baran, Rajasthan. It is located near Ramgarh village, between Mangrol 15 km to its west and Kuno National Park to its immediate East, in Mangrol tehsil of Baran district of Eastern Rajasthan.

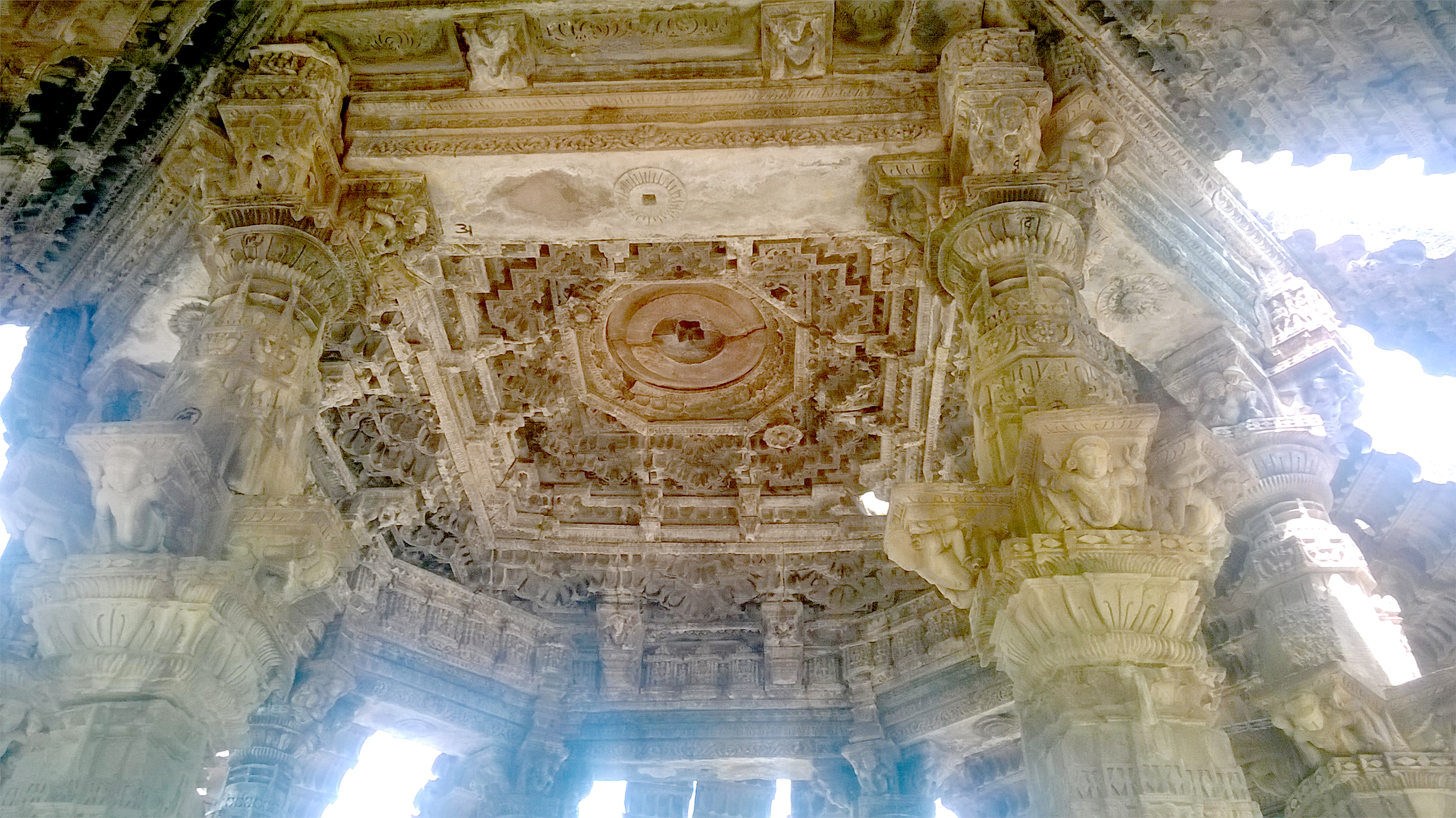
Bhand Deva temple

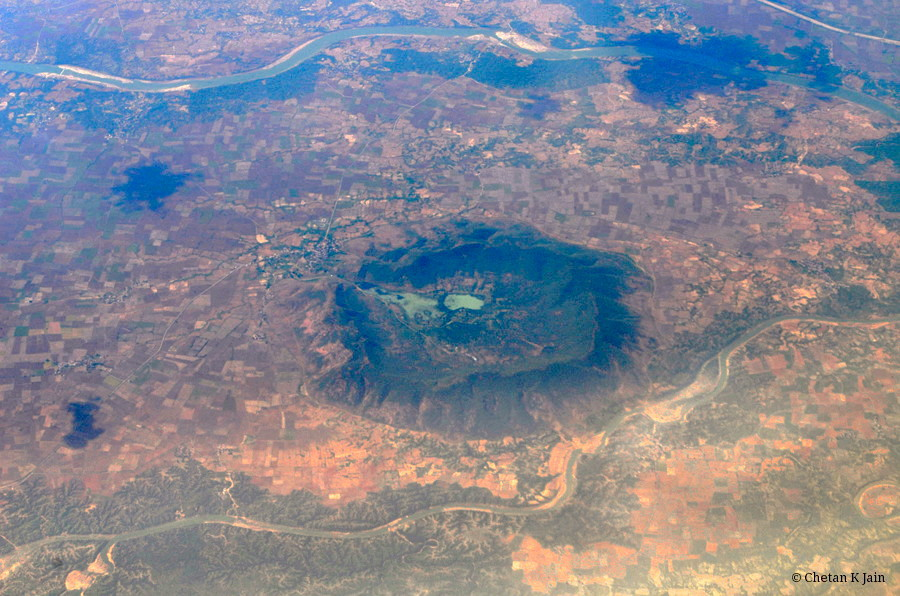
The Ramgarh Crater as seen from an aeroplane.

Up a flight of more than 750 stairs are two related temples located in a cave on Ramgarh Hill and dedicated to the goddesses Kisnai and Annapurna (Annapoorna devi). The stairs are said to have been constructed by Jhala Jalim (or Zalim) Singh (a descendant of Madhu Singh Madho Singh I), who ruled as a regent over Jhalawar State from 1771 until the British intervention in 1838. During Kartik Purnima (Kartik Poornima) a fair is organised at this temple for worshipping the two goddesses. The site is now protected by the State Archaeological Department.

An inscription on a plaque at the site records the history of the main Shiva temple as:

"Shiv-Temple (Bhand Devara) Ramgarh

This temple, dedicated to Tantric tradition of Saivism, is a noteworthy example of Nagar style temple. As the inscriptions state, it was built in the 10th century by Raja Malaya Verma of Nag dynasty of Malwa as a memorial of his victory over his enemies and as a tribute showing his gratitude to Lord Shiva whom he held in esteem. With the passage of time in 1162 A.D., the edifice was renovated by Raja Trisna Verma of Med dynasty.

The temple has audience hall vestibule spire and base. The audience hall has eight huge pillars with images of yaksha, Kinnar Kichak Vidyachar gods and goddesses apsaras and amorous couples."

== See also ==
- List of Hindu temples
- National Geological Monuments of India
- World Heritage Sites in India
