= Aklera =

Town in Jhalawar (Rajasthan), India

Aklera eklera
- Town
- Location in Rajasthan, India Aklera (India)
- Coordinates: 24.42°N 76.57°E
- Country: India
- State: Rajasthan
- District: Jhalawar
- Elevation: 309 m (1,014 ft)

Population (2011)
  - Total: 37,714

Languages
  - Official: Hindi
- Time zone: UTC+5:30 (IST)
- PIN: 326033

Aklera is a town and an Indian municipality in Jhalawar district in the state of Rajasthan. It is in the south-eastern region of Rajasthan at the edge of the Malwa plateau and has a rocky, scrub-covered terrain.

== History ==
The city of Aklera is situated in the south-eastern region of Rajasthan, a region widely known as Hadoti (Hadavati), the land of Hadas. The Hadas are a major branch of the great Chauhan clan of Agnikula Rajputs.

In the 12th century A.D., Hada Rao Deva conquered this territory and founded Bundi State and Hadauti. Later in the early 17th century A. D. during the reign of Mughal emperor Jahangir, the Ruler of Bundi, Rao Ratan Singh gave the smaller principality of Kota to his son, Madho Singh, but when Sahajahan became the emperor, he issued a Farmaan in the name of Madho Singh, recognizing as him the King of Kota. The domain of the Hadas of Bundi and Kota extended from the hills of Bundi in the west to the Malwa plateau in the east, with a similar expanse from north to south.

== Geography ==
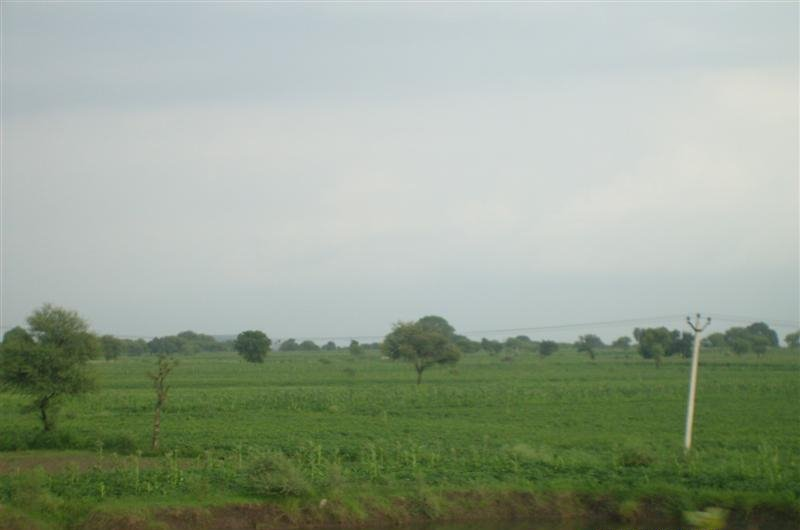
The soil of Aklera

At the border of Rajasthan and Madhya Pradesh, nudging its fat belly into neighboring MP is Aklera. Aklera is located at 24.42°N 76.57°E. It has an average elevation of 1,013 feet (309 m).

The State of Jhalawar was founded on 8 April 1838, out of the Kota territory. Jhalawar state got rise as a result of a treaty between English rulers, Kota state, and Malwa state.

The Aklera area is an expanse of fertile plain with rich black-cotton soil. It is watered by several rivers, including Parban, Newaj and Chapi.

=== Climate ===
The climate of the area is very much similar to that of the Indo-Gangetic plain, with hot dry summers and cold winters. The monsoon is, however, quite unlike and very distinct from the oppressive humid climate of the North India plains. Aklera's district (Jhalawar district) is known for the highest rainfall in the Rajasthan state. An average of 35 inches of rainfall keeps it cool, and gentle breezes ward off the stifling humidity.

- Summer : 49.0 °C (Max), 32.5 °C (Min)
- Winter : 32.5 °C (Max), 9.5 °C (Min)
- Average Rainfall : 943 mm (Per Year)
- Best Season to travel : September - March

== Demographics ==
As of 2001 India census, Aklera had a population of 18,172. Males constitute 52% of the population and females 48%. Aklera has an average literacy rate of 61%, higher than the national average of 59.5%; with 62% of the males and 38% of females literate. 17% of the population is under 6 years of age.

== Culture ==
On national highway, a big temple called RAM Mandir is situated. Annakut Ceremony celebrated every year in this temple.

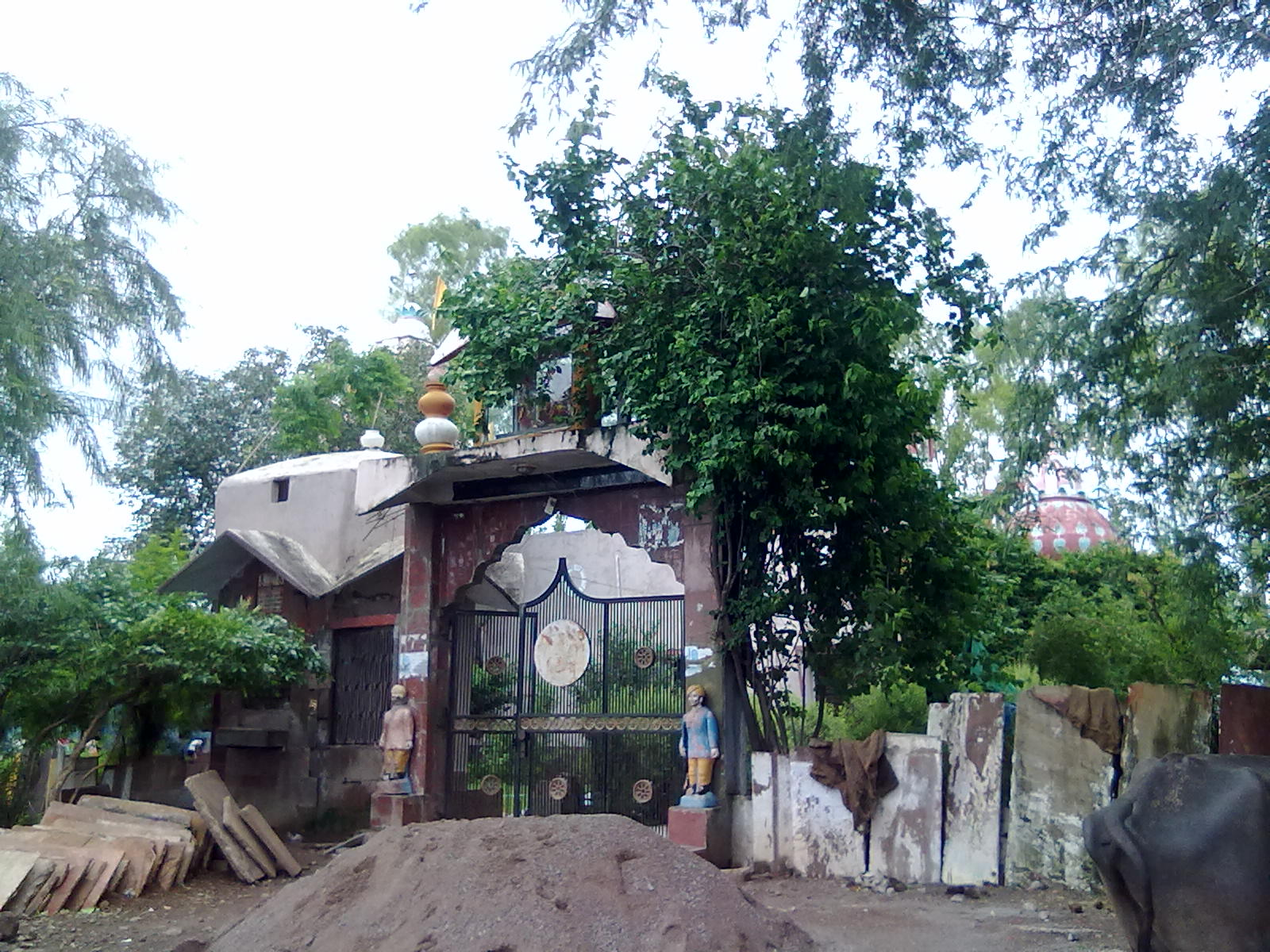
RAM Mandir, Aklera

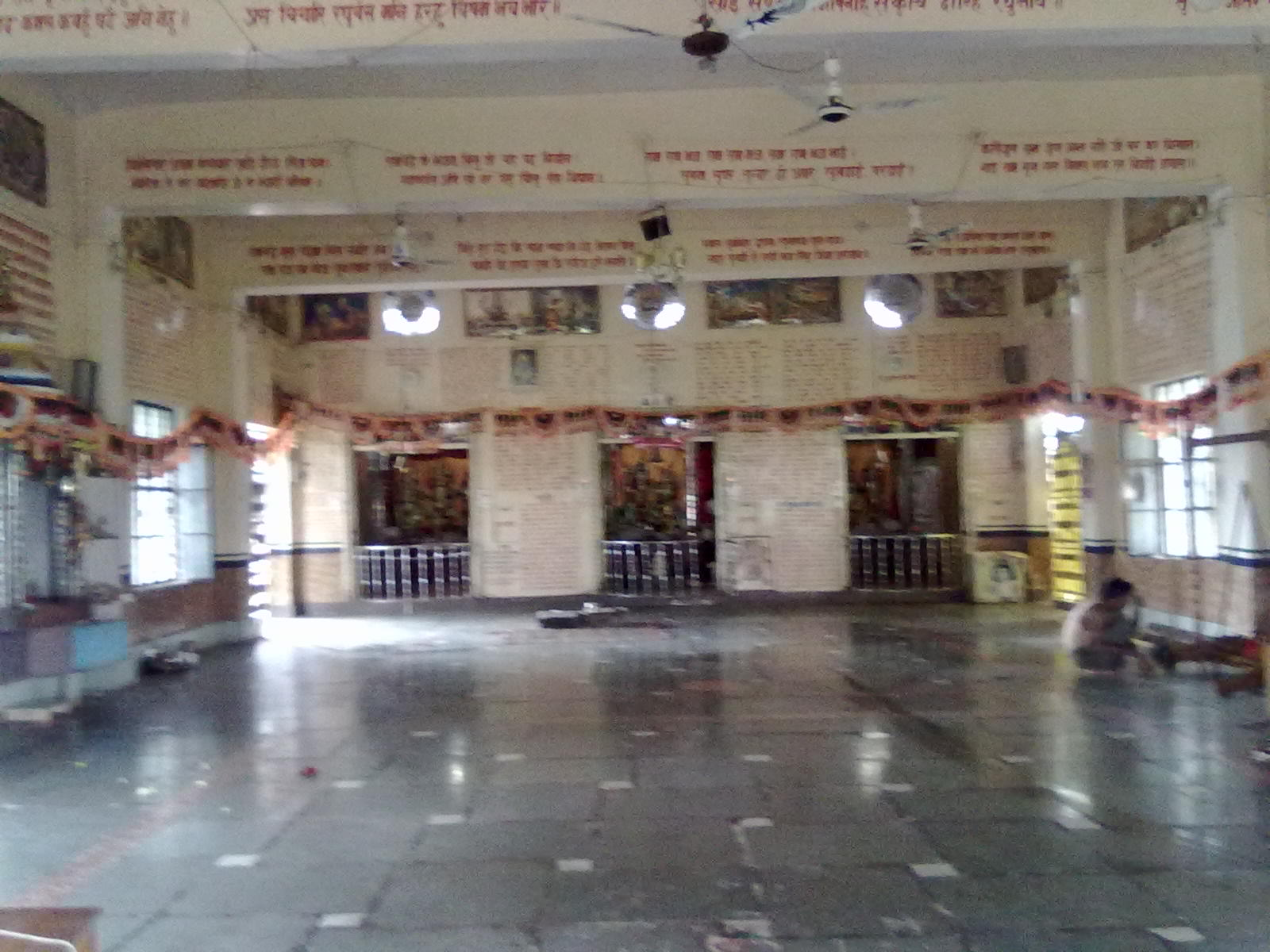
RAM Mandir inside

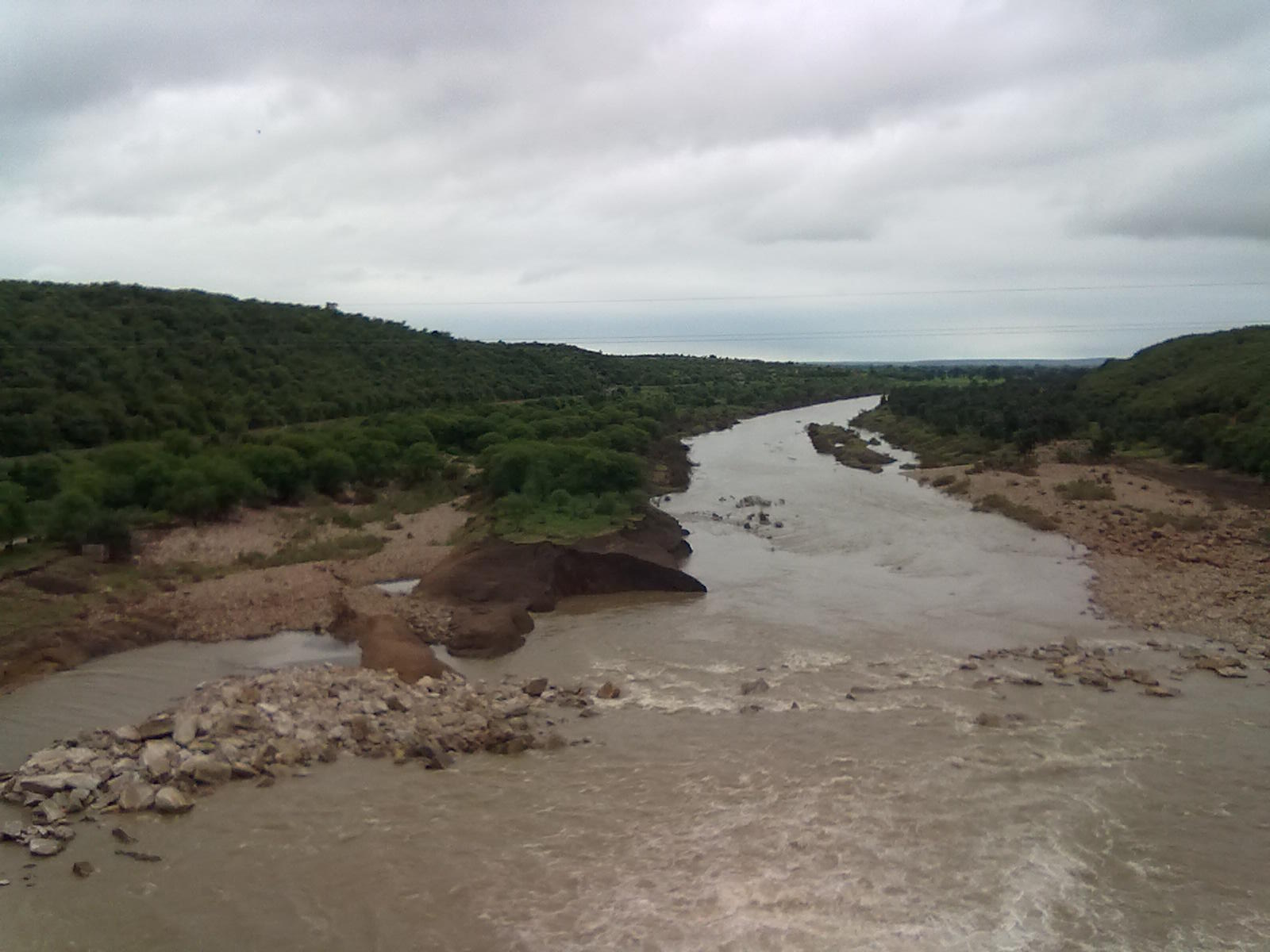
Chapi Dame

Around 16 km from Aklera, The Temple of Lord Hanuman is there, generally Known as Kamkheda Balaji. People from various states including Madhya Pradesh and Rajasthan gather twice a week on Tuesday and Saturday.

On the banks of Parwan river are ruins of an old township with a huge idol of Lord Ganesh and an 8th-century Shivlinga. This place can be approached from Khanpur by a road running from it to Aklera. Midway at a distance of 20 kilometres (12 mi), tourists find a dak-bungalow at Taraj village which was a noted game-preserve of former Kota rulers. At a distance of 10 kilometres (6 mi) from here stands the ruins of old temples dedicated to various deities of Hindu and Jain people. Officially Kakuni is in Baran district whereas Bhimgarh is in Jhalawar district.

A place of antiquity streamed with carved pillars, torans and some erotic figures in the ruins of temples scattered over an area of 2 km. It stands on the bank of river Chhapi where an irrigation dam is under construction.

Situated near the town of Khanpur, this 17th-century Jain temple is known for its architectural splendor and religious value. It has a 6-feet tall Lord Adinath statue in the sitting position. Accommodation and meals are available in the temple area at a reasonable price. The temple is located about 45 km from Aklera.

On the southern fringe of Jhalawar and Rajasthan lies an ancient Jain Temple of Lord Parshwanath. Marble temple is constructed out of the religious endowments by the pious Jain Community of Malwa (M.P.), Maharashtra, Gujarat. An important Jain pilgrimage spot with a 1000-year-old Parshwanath statue.

== Economy ==
Economy is based on agriculture in area. This area is known for the highest rainfall in the Rajasthan state. This rain is very helpful for the farmers of the region. Besides this satisfying rainfall, district has a lot of irrigation dams, ponds, and medium scale projects, that are serving according to the needs of farmers.

District area of Aklera, Jhalawar is also known for the Production of Citrus (Oranges). The area around Bhawani Mandi has the distinction of being an important place on the International and National Citrus (Naarangi) fruit map. Orange-laden orchards provide a tempting sight. Citrus produced in Jhalawar region are of export-quality, and are exported to various foreign countries. Citrus-belt is spread around the Bhawani Mandi, Jhalawar and Pirawa sub-divisions.

Agricultural Information of Area

Total land area (irrigated) : 60% Total land area (non-irrigated) : 40%

Major crops of the region KHARIF Soya Bean : Pulses : Jowar : Maize :

RABI Wheat : Mustard : Grain : Coriander :

== Education ==
For Higher Education :

- Govt. College Aklera
- Mahatma Gandhi College of Nursing Aklera
- Nirogdham School of Nursing Aklera
- NJSS Manu Public School Aklera
- Tagore T T College Aklera
- Tagore Degree College Aklera
- Tagore Public School Aklera
- Millennium TT College Aklera
- Vijayaraje Mahila TT College Aklera
- NJSS Boarding School Aklera
- Government Senior Secondary School Aklera
- Govt Girls Senior Secondary School Aklera
- Adrash Bal Vidya Mandir School Aklera
- Meera Children Sr. Sec. School Aklera
- Tilak public school Aklera
- Modern Sr.Sec.School Aklera
- The Study International School Aklera
- Gurukul Education Academy Aklera
- Mahatma Gandhi Govt School Main Market Aklera
- Mother Teresa Academy School Aklera
- Seedling School Aklera
- Royal Secondary School Aklera
- New Nalanda Sr. Sec. School Aklera
- Nav-Pallavan School Aklera
- Gour Education Group Aklera
- L.B.S. School

== Military ==
Manohar Thana means "beautiful outpost". It is a well-walled town with a strong fort. The fort commands the meeting place of two rivers Parvan and Kaalikhad. The fort has a double fortification outer wall and battlements, inside which runs another circle of walls and battlements. A good dak-bungalow is lately constructed here in the fort with good plantation around. Manohar Thana was a principal seat of Bhil kings who were supplanted by Hada Rajputs of Bundi. This fort in the tribal area of Manohar Thana once occupied an important strategic position.

The oldest rock inscription of the area was found here.

== Infrastructure ==
Nearby Airports (200 miles): Bhopal(BHO, 92.6476 miles), Indore(IDR, 123.35 miles), Gwalior(GWL, 151.108 miles), Jaipur(JAI, 177.505 miles), Khajuraho(HJR, 180.542 miles)

Nearby Railway Stations: Aklera railway station (1km) Which is situated at proposed railway line ramaganj mandi (Kota) to bhopal Via Ramganjmandi junction,Jhalawar city railway station, Jhalarapatan railway station, Khilchipur railway station (MP), Rajgarh railway station(MP), Byavra-Rajagarh junction(MP).

Other nearby railway stations: Chabra Gugor railway station (45 km), Jhalawar city railway station (53 km), Chachaura-Binaganj railway station (60 km), Byavra-Rajgarh (80 km).

Aklera has good connectivity by roads. NH 52 Highway passes from Aklera. RSRTC, MPRTC and private buses are available from Aklera to the various parts of Rajasthan.
