= Baran, Rajasthan =

Baran
- City
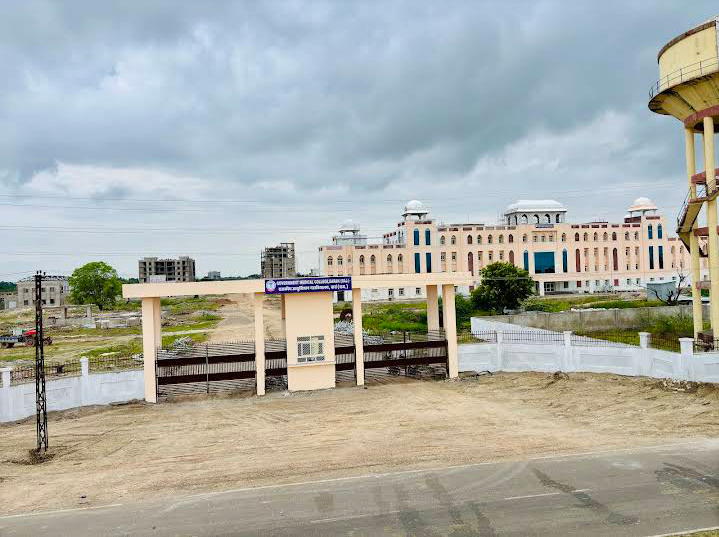
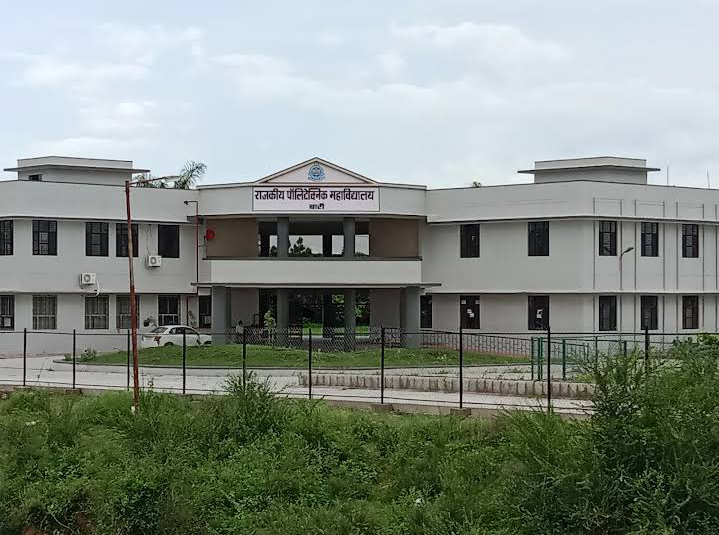
- College's in Baran

- Location in Rajasthan Location in India
- Coordinates: 25.1°N 76.52°E
- Country: India
- State: Rajasthan
- District: Baran

Area
  - Total: 32 km^{2} (12 sq mi)
- Elevation: 262 m (860 ft)

Population (2011)
  - Total: 117,992
  - Density: 3,700/km^{2} (9,500/sq mi)

Languages
  - Official: Hindi
- Time zone: UTC+5:30 (IST)
- PIN: 325205
- Telephone code: 07453
- Vehicle registration: RJ-28
- Website: baran.rajasthan.gov.in

Baran is a city in Baran district of the Indian state of Rajasthan. It is a municipality and the district headquarters of Baran district, famous for its 11th century Bhand Devra Temple on banks of Ramgarh crater. It is 339 km from the state capital Jaipur near Kota city. Three large rivers, Parban, Parbati, and Kalisindh, flow through the district.

Baran district has eight tehsils: Antah, Atru, Baran, Chhabra, Chhipabarod, Kishanganj, Mangrol, and Shahabad.

== History ==
The old name of Baran is Varah Nagari and Annapurna Nagari. During the Gupta Empire and later, it was under the rule of Yaudheya rulers and Tomar rulers, ruling from Baran kot in modern Bulandshahar in Uttar Pradesh. There's a caste called Baranwal descended from these rulers and their soldiers. By the 17th century, Mughals gained control over the city. The Shahabad Fort of Baran was built by the Mughals and even Aurangzeb visited the fort. It is a city located in southeastern Rajasthan, a state in northern India. Baran was one of the districts in the new joint Rajasthan, that was formed on 10 April 1948. The district was named after Baran city. It is located about 300 kilometres south of the state capital, Jaipur.

== Geography ==
Baran is located at 25.1°N 76.52°E. It has an average elevation of 262 metres (859 ft). It is surrounded by three Rivers Kalisindh, Parvati and Parban. The city is situated on the border of Rajasthan and Madhya Pradesh.

== Climate ==
The city has a dry climate except in the monsoon seasons. The winter season runs from mid of November to February and summer season runs from March to mid of June. The period from mid of June to September is the monsoon season followed by the months October to mid of November constitute the post-monsoon or the retreating monsoon. The average rainfall in the district is 895.2 mm. January is the coldest month with the average daily maximum temperature of 24.3 °C and the average daily minimum temperature of 10.6 °C.

== Culture ==
As Rajasthan is well known for its culture and heritage, teej-tyohaar (festivals), gangaur-gyaras, "Rang-Rangeelo Rajasthan", Baran is famous for its special carnival or fair named Dol Mela, which is celebrated for 15 to 20 days after Dol Gyaras.

== Transport ==
The city is connected with neighbouring districts and with major cities outside the state.

=== Road ===
National Highway No. 76 (now National Highway No. 27) passes through the district. National Highway No. 76 (now National Highway No. 27) is a part of East-West Corridor.

=== Train ===
Baran station is situated on Kota-Bina section of Western Central Railways. It is about 67 km from Kota Junction.

=== Air ===
The nearest major airports are located at Jaipur International Airport, Udaipur Airport, and Jodhpur Airport. These airports connect Rajasthan with the major cities of India such as Delhi and Mumbai.

== Tourism ==
Maa Bisoti Temple: Maa Bisoti Temple, located in Moondla Bisoti village, 17 km away from Baran District, is the center of faith of the devotees.

Major Tourist Places in Baran:

Ramgarh Mata Ji Mandir, Sorsan Mataji Mandir, Manihara Mahadev Mandir, Kakuni Mandir parishar, Sitabari, Ramgarh Bhand Devra Mandir, Kapil Dhara, Kanya Dah, Ramgarh Crater, Gugor Mata Mandir, Mama Bhanja Mandir, Shergarh Fort, Sorsan Wildlife Sanctuary, Nahargarh Fort, Shergarh Sanctuary, Shahbad Fort, Tapasvi Ji Ki Bagichi Shahbad, Gugaur Fort, Ascetic's Garden, Rajasthan.

=== Hadoti Panorama complex ===
Hadoti Panorama complex has been built in village Gajanpura near to Baran, to showcase the history of Hadoti. Red stones of Mount Banshipur of Karauli and White stones of Bundi are used as building material. Jharokha and Chatri are built by craftsman from Karauli. History and contribution in development of four districts Kota, Bundi, Jhalawar and Baran will be displayed. District's historical places like Kakoni, Bilasgarh, Bhand-Devra, Gargach Temple and Forts of Hadoti, will be showcased. In compound hall thematic audio and video are availed to the public.

== Cuisine ==
Typical dishes include Dal Baati Churma, Roti, Aloo Pudi and Kachori Samosas, Kheech.

== See also ==
- Chhabra
- Antah
- Atru
- Mangrol
