= Mangrol, Rajasthan =

Mangrol
- Town
- Location in Rajasthan, India Mangrol (India)
- Coordinates: 25.33°N 76.52°E
- Country: India
- State: Rajasthan
- District: Baran
- Elevation: 242 m (794 ft)

Population (2001)
  - Total: 21,836

Languages
  - Official: Hindi
- Time zone: UTC+5:30 (IST)
- PIN: 325215
- ISO 3166 code: RJ-IN
- Vehicle registration: RJ-

Mangrol is a town with municipality and tehsil in Baran district in the Indian state of Rajasthan. Pincode of Mangrol is 325215. It is the nearby location of famous Ramgarh crater made from the meteorite strike, also famous for the 11th century rock temple Bhand Deva Temple.

== Geography ==
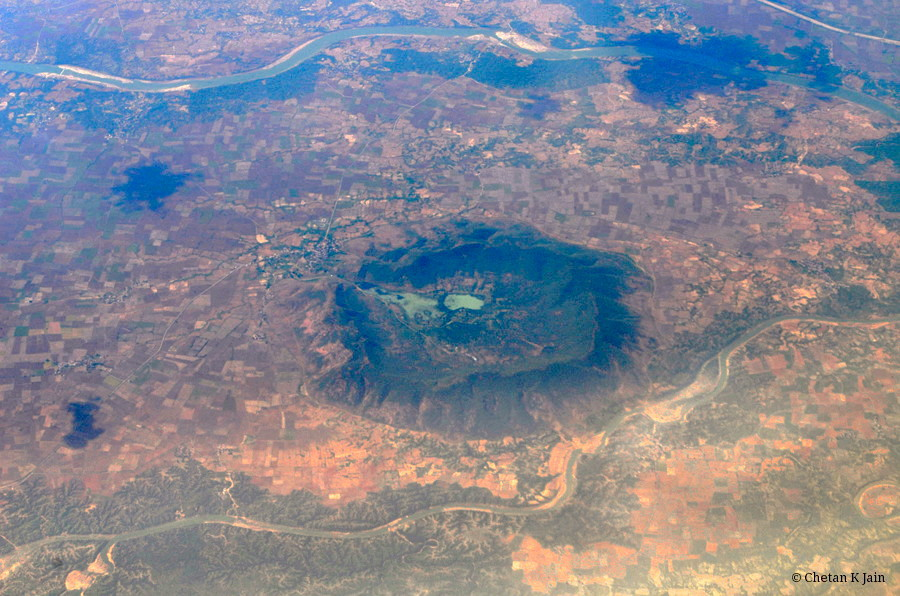
The Ramgarh Crater as seen from an aeroplane

Mangrol is located at 25.33°N 76.52°E. It has an average elevation of 242 metres (793 feet). tempal banddevra ramgard raj ka bag

== Demographics ==
As of 2001 India census, Mangrol had a population of 21,836+. Males constitute 52% of the population and females 48%. Mangrol has an average literacy rate of 54%, lower than the national average of 59.5%: male literacy is 67%, and female literacy is 40%. In Mangrol, 18% of the population is under 6 years of age.
