= Antah =

Antah Anta
- City
- Location in Rajasthan, India Antah (India)
- Coordinates: 25.15°N 76.30°E
- Country: India
- State: Rajasthan
- District: Baran
- Elevation: 253 m (830 ft)

Population (2017)
  - Total: 36,706

Languages
  - Official: Hindi
- Time zone: UTC+5:30 (IST)
- ISO 3166 code: RJ-IN
- Vehicle registration: RJ-

Antah, also spelled Anta, is a city and a municipality in Baran district in the state of Rajasthan, India.

== Geography ==
Antah is located at 25.15°N 76.30°E. It has an average elevation of 253 m (830 ft).

== Demographics ==
As of the 2001 Indian census, Antah had a population of 26,779. Males constitute 52% of the population and females 48%. Antah has an average literacy rate of 61%, higher than the national average of 59.5%; with 62% of the males and 38% of females literate. 17% of the population is under 6 years of age.

== Economy and geography ==
A National Thermal Power Corporation gas power plant is also situated in Antah. Antah is 50 km far from Kota and 24 km away from Baran. Antah is the largest city in between the two district headquarters of Kota and Baran.

== Transport ==
The city is connected with neighboring districts.

=== Rail ===
Antah railway station (station code ATH) serves Antah. Antah station is situated on the KOTA- Bina Broad-gauge line. It has two platforms. All types of trains, including express trains and very fast trains, stop at this station. Anta is also the largest city of the district after Baran.

Antah is also connected by road. State roadways and private transport busses are also available from Anta and nearby cities including Kota, Baran, Siswali, and Sangod .

== See also ==
- Antão, name
