= Parban River =

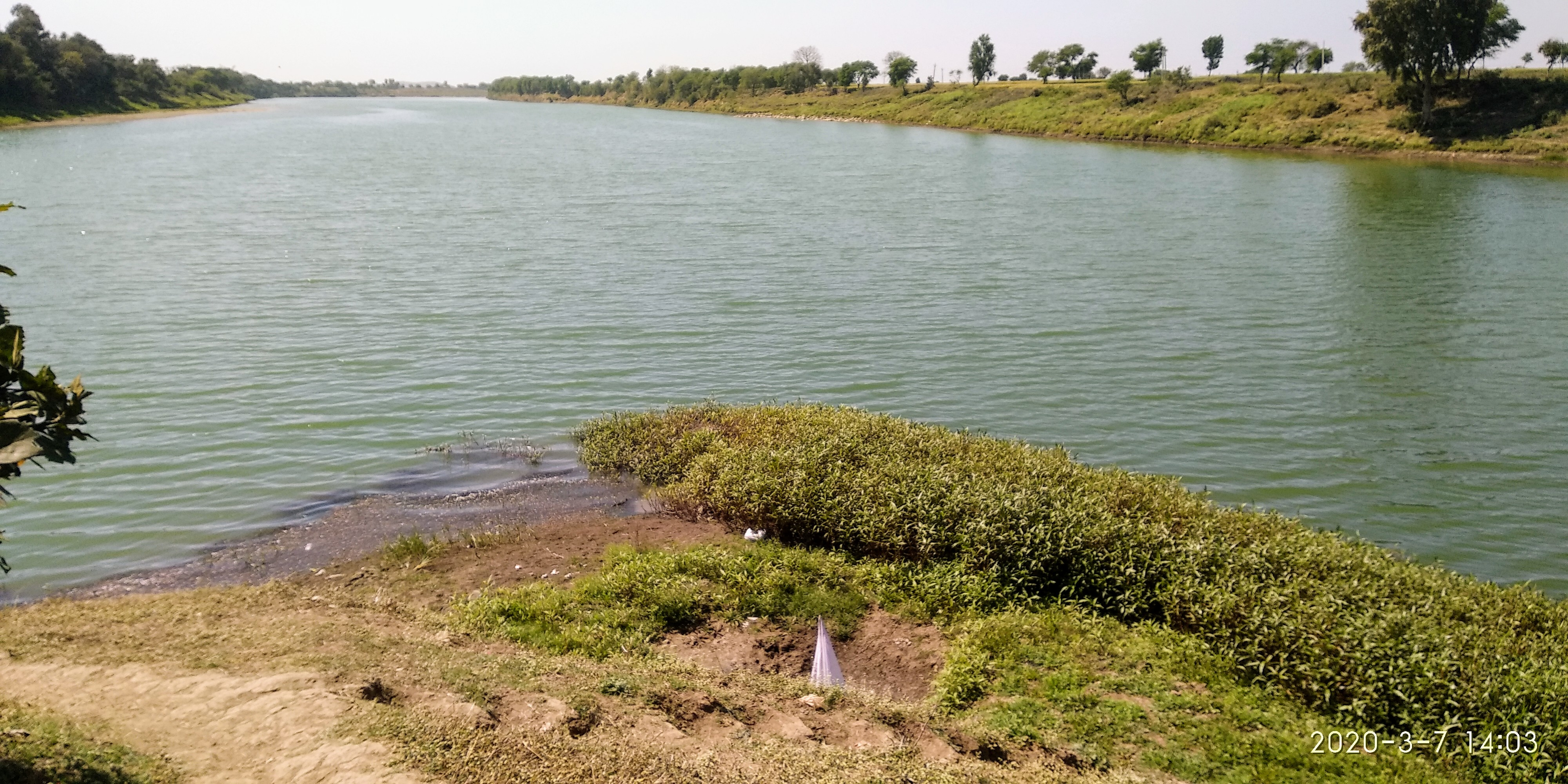
- Confluence of Parvan and Nevaj in Aklera

Location
- Country: India

Physical characteristics
- Source
  - location: Madhya Pradesh
- 2nd source
  - location: Sehore district, Madhya Pradesh
- 3rd source
  - location: Sehore, Shajapur, and Rajgarh districts, Madhya Pradesh
- 4th source
  - location: Jhalawar, Kota, and Baran districts, Rajasthan
- Mouth
  - location: Baran District, Rajasthan

Basin features
- Tributaries
  - right: Kali Sindh

Parban River originates in Madhya Pradesh and flows through Rajasthan. It is a tributary of the Kali Sindh. Parban/Parvan originates in Sehore district of Madhya Pradesh and flows through Sehore, Shajapur and Rajgarh districts in Madhya Pradesh. It also flows through Jhalawar, Kota, Baran districts of Rajasthan. Before it joins the Kali Sindh it cuts a 10 km long valley of significant depth right across Ratibar Dungar near Akawad Kalan in Jhalawar district. It meets Kali Sindh in Baran district of Rajasthan. Shergarh wildlife Sanctuary is situated at the bank of Parban river in Baran district.

Since 2017, the Parban Dam Project is being developed on Parban river. Parts of Baran district and Jhalawar district will be affected by the dam.

== Confluence ==
The Parvan river is joined by the Kalikhaad River in Manohar Thana, with Nevaj in Chachorni Jhalawar and it finally merges with the Kali Sindh River in Baran District near Palaita village.

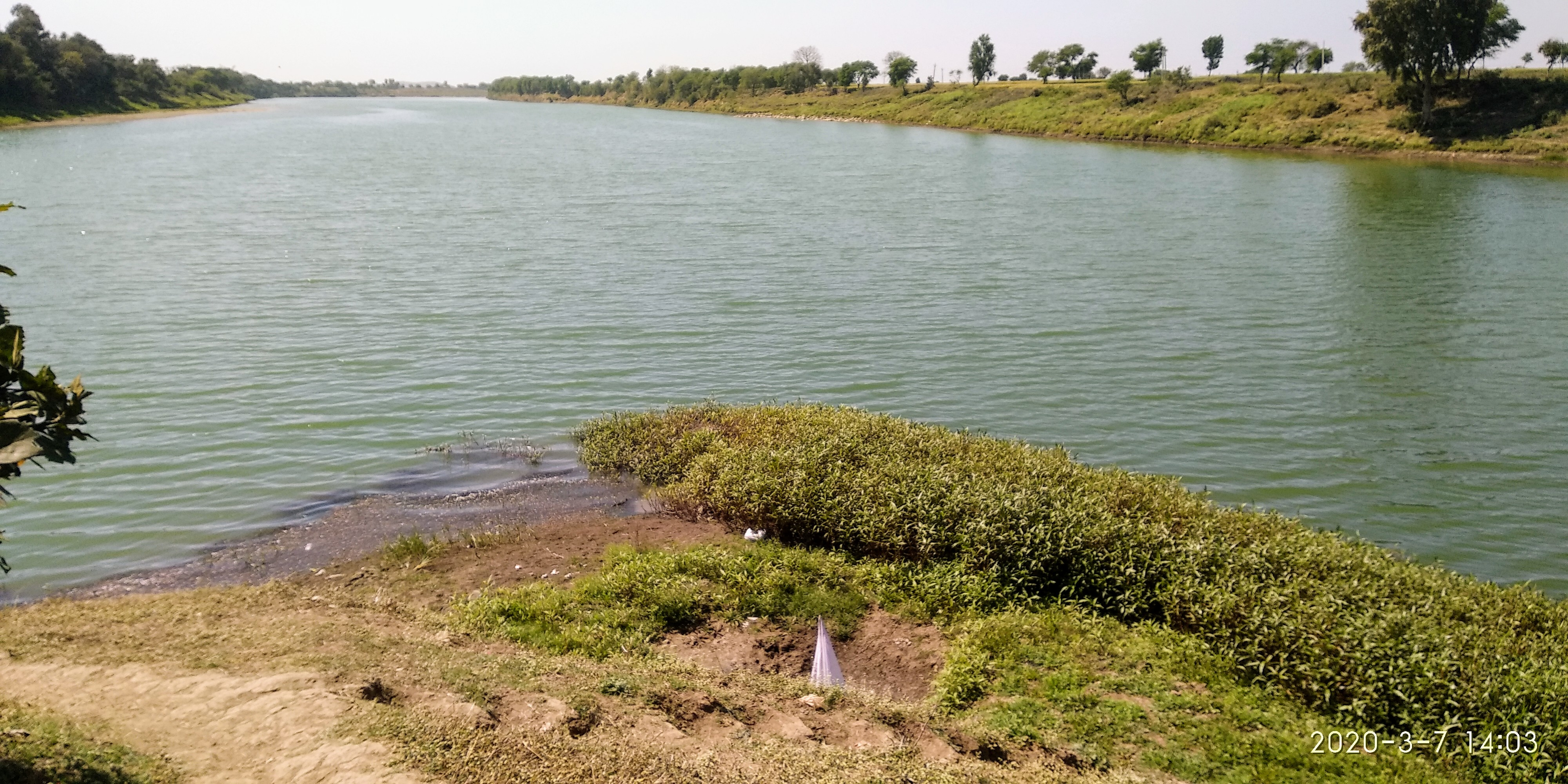
Confluence of Parvan and Nevaj in Chachorni

== Accidents ==
In rainy season, the river gets flooded and in remote locations of many areas of Baran and Jhalawar, people often died while crossing the river by boats.
