= Chhipabarod =

- Interactive map of Chhipabarod
- Coordinates: 24°37′30″N 76°42′32″E
- Country: India
- State: Rajasthan
- District: Baran

Population (2001)
  - Total: 16,026

Languages
  - Official: Hindi
- Time zone: UTC+5:30 (IST)
- ISO 3166 code: RJ-IN

Chhipabarod is a census town in Baran district in the state of Rajasthan, India.

== Demographics ==
As of 2001 India census, Chhipabarod had a population of 16,026. Males constitute 51% of the population and females 49%. Chhipabarod has an average literacy rate of 62%, higher than the national average of 59.5%; with male literacy of 73% and female literacy of 50%. 18% of the population is under 6 years of age.

== Transportation ==
The town is connected with neighbouring districts and with major cities outside the state. State Highway No. 37A passes through the town. The nearest railway stations are Chhabra Gugor Railway station (17 km away) and Salpura Railway Station (17 km). The nearest major railway station is Kota Junction (138 km). The town has a bus stand. The nearest major airports are Jaipur International Airport, Udaipur Airport, and Jodhpur Airport. These airports connect Rajasthan with the major cities of India such as Delhi and Mumbai.

== Education ==
The town has good educational resources and infrastructure including some schools and one college. Schools are generally affiliated with the Board of Secondary Education, Rajasthan.

=== Government schools ===
- Government E Mitra GLG Computers
- Government Primary School
- Daanmal Senior Secondary School
- Government Girls School

=== Private schools ===
- Maheshwari Public School
- Sushila Devi Aadarsh Vidya Mandir
- Seva Bharti Senior Secondary School
- MJF Senior Secondary School
- Shri Agrasen Senior Secondary School
- Laxmi Chand Goyal School
- Radhakrishna English Academy
- Barat Bhal Vidhya Mandhir School
- U.P.S. Dhamniya
