= Chhabra =

Chhabra Village Chhabra
- city
- Location in Rajasthan, India Chhabra Village (India)
- Coordinates: 24.67°N 76.83°E
- Country: India
- State: Rajasthan
- District: Baran
- Elevation: 321 m (1,053 ft)

Population (2011)
  - Total: 32,285

Languages
  - Official: Hindi
- Time zone: UTC+5:30 (IST)
- Postal code: 325220
- Area code: 07452
- ISO 3166 code: RJ-IN
- Vehicle registration: Rj28

Chhabra is a city and a municipality in Baran district in the state of Rajasthan, India, near to the border with Madhya Pradesh. Chhabra is a historic walled city with a fort. Its name comes from the six gates in the walls.

== Geography ==
Chhabra is located at 24.67°N 76.83°E. It has an average elevation of 321 metres (1053 feet). Chhabra is connected with broad gauge line and is well connected to Jaipur, Kota, Indore, Jabalpur etc. by Express and Passenger trains.

== Demographics ==
As of 2010 India census, Chhabra had a population of 32,285. Males constitute 52.172% of the population and females 47.827%. The literacy rate of Chhabra city is 72.84% higher than the state average of 66.11%. In Chhabra. male literacy is around 82.09% while the female literacy rate is 62.87%. The population of children aged 0-6 is 4649 which is 14.40% of total population of Chhabra (M). In Chhabra Municipality, the female sex ratio is 917 against state average of 928. Moreover, the child sex ratio in Chhabra is around 857 compared to Rajasthan state average of 888.

== Culture ==
Hadoti is the most spoken language of the city followed by Hindi.

== Thermal power plant ==
Chhabra has a thermal power plant which is operational. The second phase (4 X 250 MW) and (2 X 660 ) of the Thermal Power Plant is in running condition. This plant is owned by RRVUNL and as per information available on the web site of RRVUNL the second phase is likely to become operational in December 2011. The proposed capacity of thermal power plant is 2,320 MW now.

== See also ==
Chhabra (Rajasthan Assembly constituency)

Chhabra Thermal Power Plant
