= Atru =

Atru Atalpuri
- Town
- Atru Railway Station

- Location within Rajasthan Location within India
- Coordinates: 24.81°N 76.63°E
- Country: India
- State: Rajasthan
- District: Baran (Hadoti Region)

Government
  - Type: Democratic
  - Body: Municipal Council
  - Pradhan: Smt.Vandana Nagar (INC)
  - Member of Parliament Jhalawar-Baran (Lok Sabha constituency): Dushyant Singh (BJP)
  - Member of Legislative Assembly Atru-Baran Legislative constituency: Radheshyam Bairwa (BJP)
- Elevation: 289 m (948 ft)

Population (2011)
  - Total: 11,141
- Demonym: Rajasthani

Languages
  - Official: Hindi, English
  - Native: Hadoti
- Time zone: UTC+5:30 (IST)
- PIN: 325218
- Telephone code: 07451
- Sex ratio: 940 ♀/♂
- Website: lsg.rajasthan.gov.in/ulbatru/

Atru is a town in the Baran district in Rajasthan, India. It is a tehsil of Baran around 30 kilometres south of the Baran district.

== History ==
A 1257 CE inscription of the Paramara king Jayavarman II was found on the pillar of the Gadgach temple in Atru. The 6-line inscription records the grant of a village to a poet. It is possible that Jayavarman extended the Paramara territories in present-day Rajasthan, resulting in his conflict with the Chahamana rulers of Ranthambore.

== Politics ==
The Member of Parliament from Atru is Dushyant Singh, who is a member of the BJP and also the son of ex-Rajasthan chief minister Vasundhara Raje.

== Climate ==
The town has a dry climate except during the monsoon season. The summer runs from March to mid-June, as in most parts of the country. The period from mid-June to September is the monsoon season, and the period from October to mid-November constitute the post-monsoon or retreating monsoon season. January is generally the coldest month with an average daily maximum temperature of 24.3 °C (75.8 °F), and an average daily minimum temperature of 10.6 °C (51.1 °F). Usually, the town has a dry climate except during monsoon season, when the weather becomes humid. The months from November to February constitute winter. The average rainfall experienced by the town is around 895.2 mm (35.2 inches).
