= Baran district =

- District
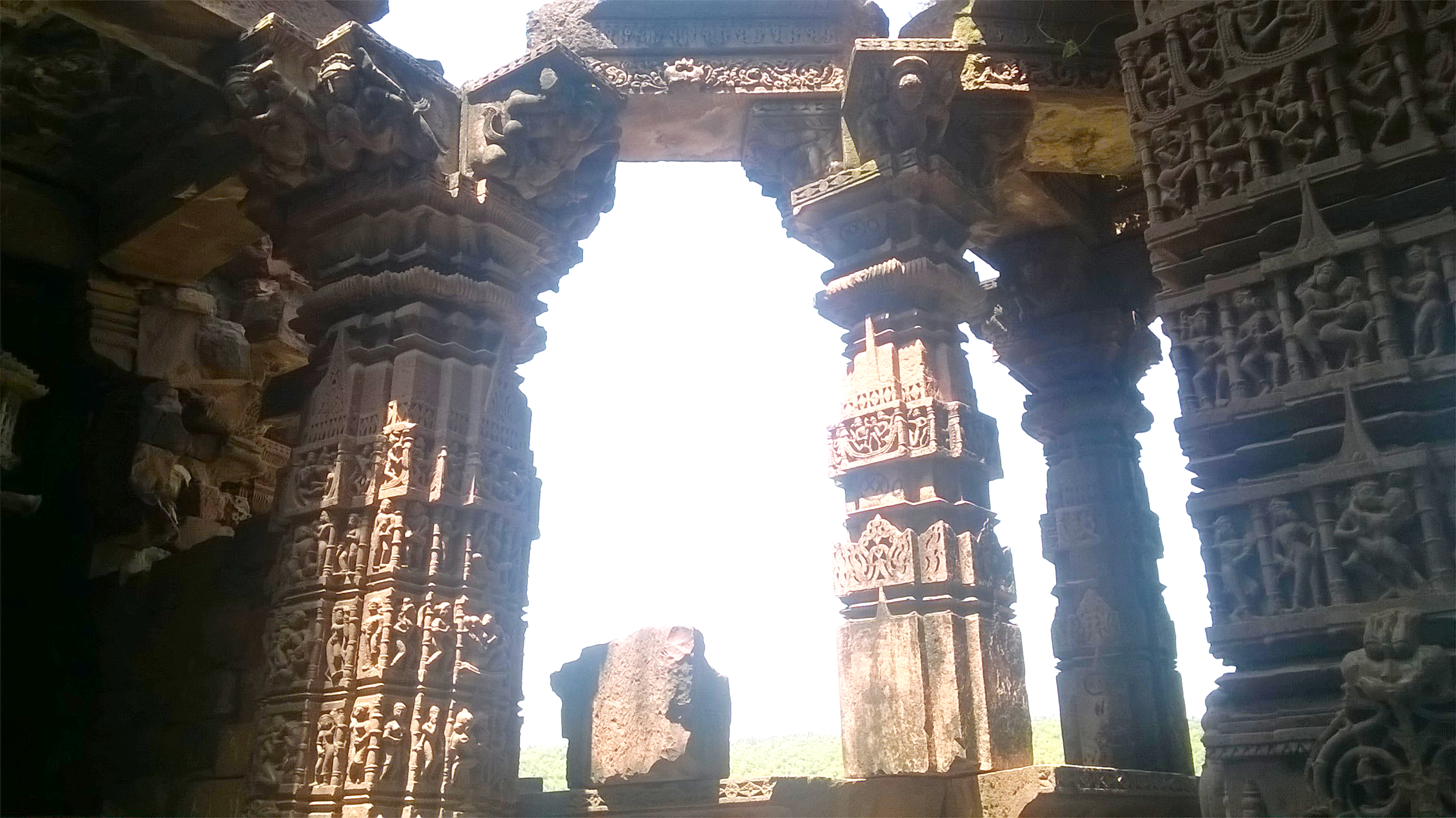
- Bhand Devra Temple

- Coordinates: 25.1°N 76.52°E
- Country: India
- State: Rajasthan
- Division: Kota
- Formed: 10 April 1991
- Headquarters: Baran

Area
  - Total: 6,992 km^{2} (2,700 sq mi)
- Elevation: 262 m (860 ft)

Population (2011)
  - Total: 1,222,755
  - Density: 174.9/km^{2} (452.9/sq mi)

Languages
  - Official: Hindi
- Time zone: UTC+5:30 (IST)
- PIN: 325205
- Telephone code: 07453
- Vehicle registration: RJ-28
- Website: baran.rajasthan.gov.in

Baran district is a district in the Indian state of Rajasthan. The headquarters of the district are located at the city of Baran.

== History ==
Before Indian independence in 1947, most of present-day Baran district was part of the princely state of Kota. It was formed on 10 April 1991 by carving out Kota district. The district got its name from the existing Baran city which is also presently the district headquarters.

The 10th century Bhand Deva Temple in the style of Khajuraho temples is situated on the banks of a pond in the centre of the 4 km wide Ramgarh crater about 40 km from the city of Baran, Rajasthan as well as 240 km from the Dhala crater.

== Geography ==
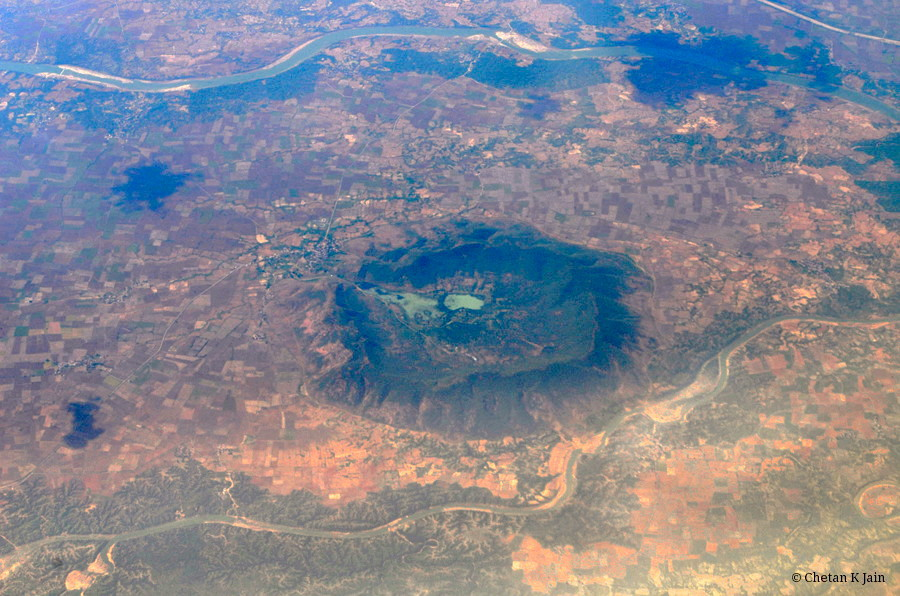
The Ramgarh Crater as seen from an aeroplane

Baran is located at 25.1°N 76.52°E. It has an average elevation of 262 metres (859 feet). Located in the Kota Plateau of Vindhya Range, district is the location of famous Ramgarh crater made from the meteorite strike.

=== Rivers ===
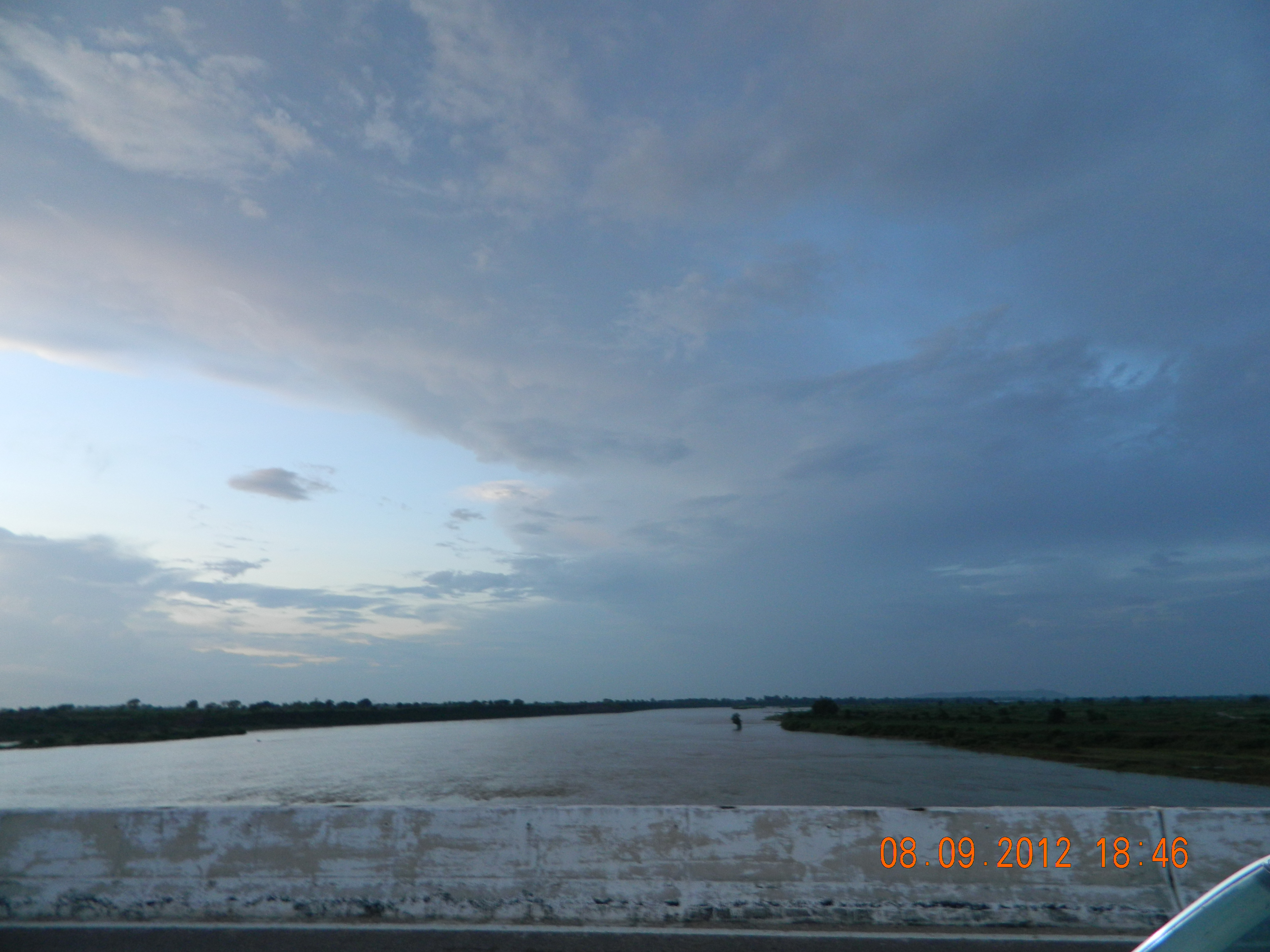
Parvati River-by-H.N.Singh

Kali Sindh, Parvati, Parwan, Andheri, Ban-Ganga are the major rivers.

=== Climate ===
The City has a dry climate except in the monsoon seasons. The winter season runs from mid November to February and summer season runs from March to mid June. The period from mid of June to September is the monsoon season followed by the months October to mid of November constitute the post monsoon or the retreating monsoon. The average rainfall in the district is 895.2mm. January is the coldest month with the average daily maximum temperature of 24.3 °C and the average daily minimum temperature of 10.6 °C.

=== Tehsils ===
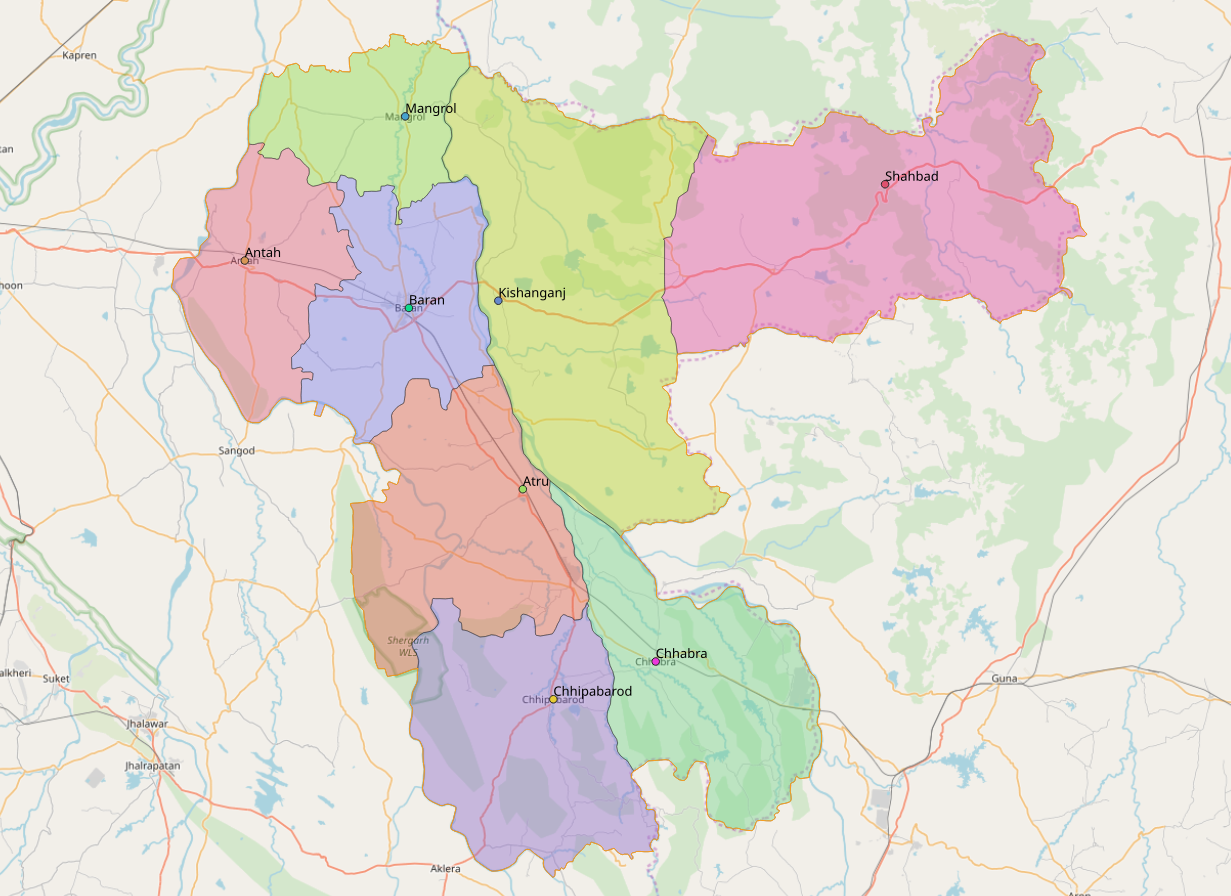
Tehsils in Baran district

1. Baran
2. Chhipabarod
3. Kishanganj
4. Chhabra
5. Atru
6. Shahbad
7. Antah
8. Mangrol

== Demographics ==
Religions in Baran District (2011)
Religion	Percent
Hinduism	92.69%
Islam	6.54%
Other or not stated	0.77%

According to the 2011 census, Baran district had a population of 1,222,755. It roughly equals to the nation of Trinidad and Tobago or the US state of New Hampshire. This gives it a ranking of 389th in India (out of a total of 640). The district has a population density of 175 inhabitants per square kilometre (450/sq mi). Its population growth rate over the decade 2001-2011 was 19.8%. Baran has a sex ratio of 926 females for every 1000 males, and a literacy rate of 67.38%. 20.79% of the population lives in urban areas. Scheduled Castes and Scheduled Tribes make up 18.09% and 22.64% of the population respectively.

=== Languages ===
Languages in Baran district (2011)
1. Harauti (Rajasthani) (70.6%)
2. Hindi (25.4%)
3. Urdu (1.92%)
4. Others (2.12%)

At the time of the 2011 census, 70.59% of the population spoke Hadoti (Rajasthani), 25.37% Hindi and 1.92% Urdu as their first language.

== Transport ==
=== Roadways ===
The city is connected with neighbouring districts and with major cities outside the state. National Highway No.76 (now National Highway No. 27) passes through the district. National Highway No.76 (now National Highway No. 27) is a part of East-West Corridor.

=== Airways ===
The nearest major airports are located at Jaipur International Airport, Udaipur Airport, and Jodhpur Airport. These airports connect Rajasthan with the major cities of India such as Delhi and Mumbai. There are two other airports in Kota and Jaisalmer, but are not open for commercial/civilian flights yet.

=== Railway ===
Baran station is situated on Kota-Bina section of Western Central Railways. It is about 67 km from Kota Junction.

== Cuisine ==
Typical dishes include Dal Baati Churma, Kheech Kachori, Samosa, Roti.

== Localities ==
- Baldara (town)
