= Raghunathpur =

Raghunathpur may refer to the following places:

== India ==
- Raghunathpur, Aurangabad, Bihar
- Raghunathpur, Buxar, Bihar
- Raghunathpur, Siwan, Bihar
  - Raghunathpur, Siwan (Vidhan Sabha constituency)
- Raghunathpur, Jagatsinghpur district, Odisha
  - Raghunathpur railway station
- Raghunathpur, Uttar Pradesh, in Ghaziabad district
- Raghunathpur, Raebareli, Uttar Pradesh
- Raghunathpur, Unnao, Uttar Pradesh
- Raghunathpur, Chanditala-I, Hooghly district, West Bengal
- Raghunathpur, West Bengal
- Raghunathpur (PS-Dankuni), Hooghly district, West Bengal
- Raghunathpur (PS-Magra), Hooghly district, West Bengal
- Raghunathpur, Purulia, West Bengal
  - Raghunathpur subdivision
  - Raghunathpur I, a community development block
  - Raghunathpur II, a community development block
  - Raghunathpur, Purulia (Vidhan Sabha constituency) in West Bengal

== Bangladesh ==
- Raghunathpur, Pirojpur District

== Nepal ==
- Raghunathpur, Bara
- Raghunathpur, Dhanusha
- Raghunathpur, Mahottari
- Raghunathpur, Rautahat

== See also ==
- Raghunathpura, Rajasthan
- Raghunath (disambiguation)
