= Ganganagar Lok Sabha constituency =

Lok Sabha constituency in Rajasthan, India

Coordinates: 29.9°N 73.9°E

Ganganagar RJ-1
- Lok Sabha constituency
- Interactive Map Outlining Ganganagar Lok Sabha Constituency

Constituency details
- Country: India
- Region: North India
- State: Rajasthan
- Assembly constituencies: Sadulshahar; Ganganagar; Karanpur; Suratgarh; Raisinghnagar; Sangaria; Hanumangarh; Pilibanga
- Established: 1952
- Total electors: 21,02,002
- Reservation: SC

Member of Parliament
- 18th Lok Sabha
- Incumbent Kuldeep Indora
- Party: Indian National Congress
- Elected year: 2024

Ganganagar Lok Sabha constituency (Hindi pronunciation: [gəŋgaːnəgəɾ]) is one of the 25 Lok Sabha (parliamentary) constituencies in Rajasthan state in India.

== Assembly segments ==
Presently, Ganganagar Lok Sabha constituency comprises eight Vidhan Sabha (legislative assembly) segments. These are:

#	Name	District	Member	Party	2024 Lead
1	Sadulshahar	Ganganagar	Gurveer Singh Brar	BJP	INC
2	Ganganagar	Ganganagar	Jaydeep Bihani	BJP	BJP
3	Karanpur	Ganganagar	Rupinder Singh Kooner	INC	INC
4	Suratgarh	Ganganagar	Dungar Ram Gedar	INC	INC
5	Raisinghnagar (SC)	Ganganagar	Sohan Lal Nayak	INC	INC
7	Sangaria	Hanumangarh	Abhimanyu Poonia	INC	INC
8	Hanumangarh	Hanumangarh	Ganesh Raj Bansal	IND	INC
9	Pilibanga (SC)	Hanumangarh	Vinod Gothwal	INC	INC

== Members of Parliament ==
Year	Member	Party
1952	Pannalal Barupal 'Meghwal'	Indian National Congress
1957	Pannalal Barupal 'Meghwal'	Indian National Congress
1962	Pannalal Barupal 'Meghwal'	Indian National Congress
1967	Pannalal Barupal 'Meghwal'	Indian National Congress
1971	Pannalal Barupal 'Meghwal'	Indian National Congress
1977	Bega Ram Chauhan 'Meghwal'	Janata Party
1980	Birbal Ram Meghwal	Indian National Congress
1984	Birbal Ram Meghwal	Indian National Congress
1989	Bega Ram Chauhan 'Meghwal'	Janata Dal
1991	Birbal Ram Meghwal	Indian National Congress
1996	Nihalchand Meghwal	Bharatiya Janata Party
1998	Shankar Pannu	Indian National Congress
1999	Nihalchand Meghwal	Bharatiya Janata Party
2004	Nihalchand Meghwal	Bharatiya Janata Party
2009	Bharat Ram Meghwal	Indian National Congress
2014	Nihalchand Meghwal	Bharatiya Janata Party
2019	Nihalchand Meghwal	Bharatiya Janata Party
2024	Kuldeep Indora	Indian National Congress

== Election results ==
=== 2024 ===
2024 Indian general election: Ganganagar
Party	Candidate	Votes	%	±%
INC	Kuldeep Indora	726,492	51.4	▲17.63
BJP	Priyanka Balan Meghwal	6,38,339	45.16	▼16.64
NOTA	None of the above	13,095	0.93	▼0.14
Majority		88,153	6.24	▼21.79
Turnout		14,13,494	66.59	▼8.18
INC gain from BJP		Swing	▲17.63	

=== 2019 ===
2019 Indian general elections: Ganganagar
Party	Candidate	Votes	%	±%
BJP	Nihalchand Meghwal	897,177	61.8	▲9.72
INC	Bharat Ram Meghwal	4,90,199	33.77	▲4.78
CPI	Revatharam Nayik	18,309	1.26	N/A
NOTA	None of the Above	15,543	1.07	N/A
Margin of victory		4,06,978	28.03	▲4.82
Turnout		14,53,085	74.77	▲1.60
BJP hold		Swing	▲9.72	

=== 2014 Lok Sabha ===
2014 Indian general elections: Ganganagar
Party	Candidate	Votes	%	±%
BJP	Nihalchand Meghwal	658,130	52.08	▲15.15
INC	Bhanwarlal Meghwal	3,66,389	28.99	▼23.40
NUZP	Shimla Devi Nayak	1,06,585	8.43	New
AAP	Dr Balkrishan Bawari	40,016	3.17	New
Margin of victory		2,91,741	23.21	▲7.75
Turnout		12,57,361	73.17	▲12.20
BJP gain from INC		Swing	▲15.15	

=== 2009 Lok Sabha ===
2009 Indian general elections: Ganganagar
Party	Candidate	Votes	%	±%
INC	Bharat Ram Meghwal	476,554	52.39	▲7.56
BJP	Nihalchand Meghwal	3,35,886	36.93	▼7.90
BSP	Sita Ram	29,072	3.20	▼0.28
CPI(M)	Comred Shyopat Ram	26,923	2.96	▼0.19
Majority		1,40,668	15.46	▲14.44
Turnout		9,09,629	60.97	▲6.90
INC gain from BJP		Swing	▲7.56	

=== 2004 Lok Sabha ===
General Election, 2004: Ganganagar
Party	Candidate	Votes	%	±%
BJP	Nihalchand Meghwal	331,475	45.85	▼7.99
INC	Bharat Ram	3,24,082	44.83	▲5.40
BSP	Munshi Ram	25,144	3.48	▲0.99
CPI(M)	Comred Shyopatram	22,801	3.15	▲0.23
Independent	Teetar Singh	8,047	1.11	N/A
LPSP	Babu Lal	5,327	0.74	▲0.07
AITC	Kartar Singh Bains	5,026	0.4	N/A
Independent	Teeku Ram	3,702	0.51	N/A
RJVP	Hetram	2,360	0.33	▲0.27
Majority		7,393	1.02	▼13.39
Turnout		7,22,938	54.07	▲1.27
BJP hold		Swing	▼7.99	

== See also ==
- Sri Ganganagar
- List of constituencies of the Lok Sabha
