= Priyanka Balan Meghwal =

Indian politician

- प्रियंका बैलान मेघवाल

State Secretary, BJP Rajasthan; Chairperson, Anupgarh Municipal Council

Personal details
- Party: Bharatiya Janata Party

Priyanka Balan Meghwal is an Indian politician from Rajasthan and a member of the Bharatiya Janata Party (BJP). She has served as chairperson of the Anupgarh Municipal Council and as a state office-bearer of the BJP's Rajasthan unit. In the 2024 Indian general election, she contested the Ganganagar Lok Sabha constituency as the BJP candidate.

== Political career ==
=== Anupgarh municipal politics ===
In the 2020 Rajasthan local elections, the BJP won 18 of the 35 wards of the Anupgarh municipal board. Balan Meghwal was elected unopposed from ward 19, and the BJP selected her for the post of municipal chairperson.

=== BJP state organisation ===
In July 2023, Balan Meghwal was appointed as a pradesh mantri (state secretary) of the BJP's Rajasthan unit.

=== 2024 Lok Sabha election ===
In March 2024, the BJP selected Balan Meghwal as its candidate from the Ganganagar Lok Sabha constituency, which is reserved for candidates belonging to the Scheduled Castes. Contemporary election coverage described her as the BJP's first woman candidate from the constituency.

Balan Meghwal contested the election against Kuldeep Indora of the Indian National Congress and other candidates. She received 638,339 votes and finished second, while Indora received 726,492 votes and won the constituency by 88,153 votes.

== Education ==
According to her election affidavit, Balan Meghwal completed a Master of Business Administration from Mohanlal Sukhadia University, Udaipur, in 2012.
