= Chak Bhadokhar =

Chak Bhadokhar Chak Bhadokhār
- Village
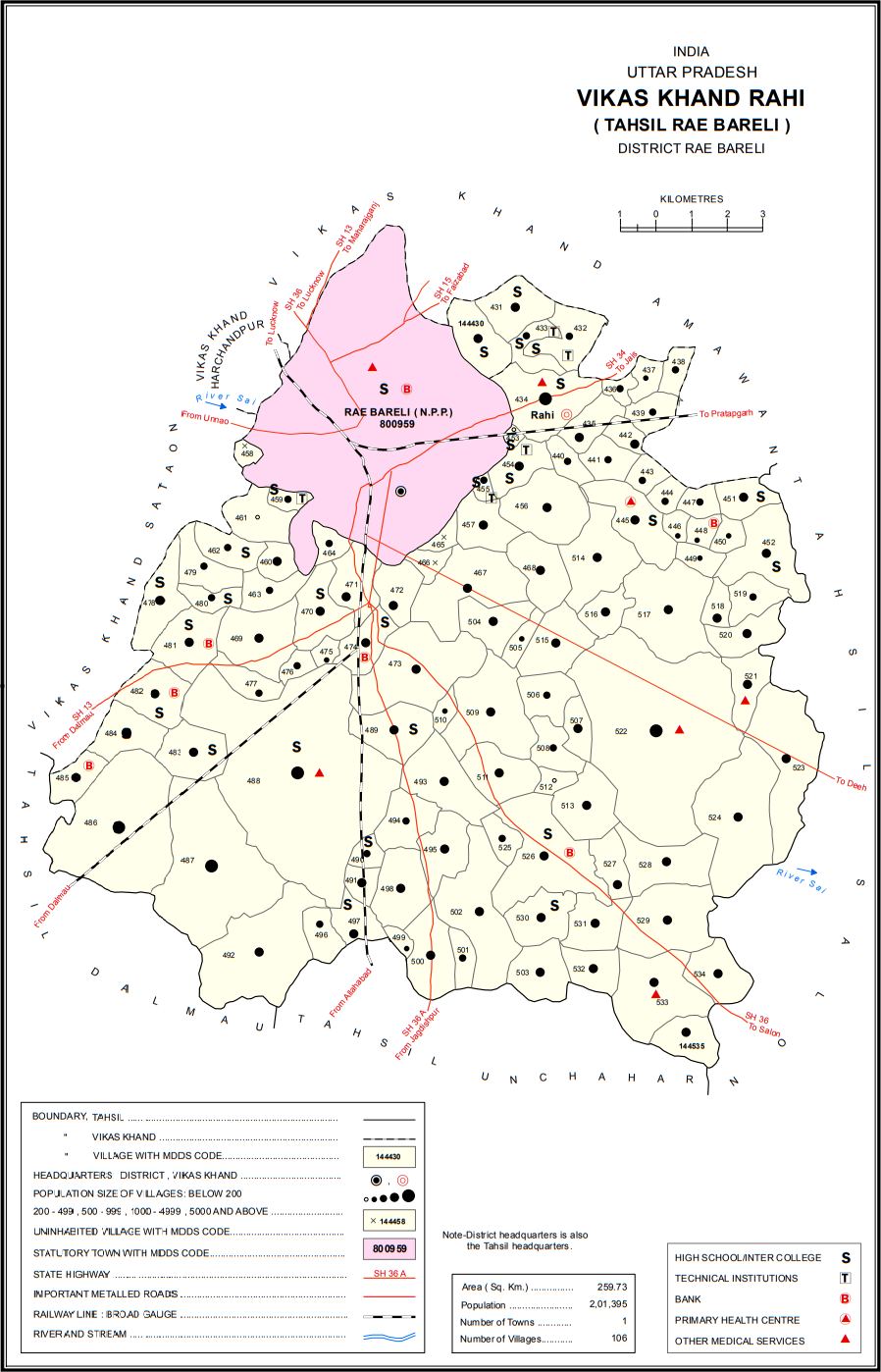
- Map showing Chak Bhadokhar (#512) in Rahi CD block

- Location in Uttar Pradesh, India
- Coordinates: 26.143055°N 81.303277°E
- Country: India
- State: Uttar Pradesh
- District: Raebareli

Area
  - Total: 0.335 km^{2} (0.129 sq mi)

Population (2011)
  - Total: 115
  - Density: 343/km^{2} (889/sq mi)

Languages
  - Official: Hindi
- Time zone: UTC+5:30 (IST)
- Vehicle registration: UP-35

Chak Bhadokhar is a village in Rahi block of Rae Bareli district, Uttar Pradesh, India. It is located 11 km from Rae Bareli, the district headquarters. As of 2011, it has a population of 115 people, in 22 households. The village has no schools, medical facilities nor hosts any weekly haat or permanent market. It belongs to the nyaya panchayat of Bhadokhar.

The 1951 census recorded Chak Bhadokhar as comprising 1 hamlet, with a total population of 57 people (30 male and 27 female), in 13 households and 11 physical houses. The area of the village was given as 82 acres. The village was listed as belonging to the pargana of Rae Bareli South and the thana of Kotwali.

The 1961 census recorded Chak Bhadokhar as comprising 1 hamlet, with a total population of 62 people (30 male and 32 female), in 12 households and 9 physical houses. The area of the village was given as 82 acres.

The 1981 census recorded Chak Bhadokhar as having a population of 161 people, in 14 households, and having an area of 323.76 hectares. The main staple foods were listed as wheat and rice.

The 1991 census recorded Chak Bhadokhar as having a total population of 108 people (58 male and 50 female), in 18 households and 18 physical houses. The area of the village was listed as 33 hectares. Members of the 0-6 age group numbered 19, or 18% of the total; this group was 58% male (11) and 42% female (8). No members of scheduled castes or scheduled tribes were recorded. The literacy rate of the village was 47% (37 men and 14 women). 31 people were classified as main workers (27 men and 4 women), while 16 people were classified as marginal workers (1 man and 15 women); the remaining 61 residents were non-workers. The breakdown of main workers by employment category was as follows: 27 cultivators (i.e. people who owned or leased their own land); 0 agricultural labourers (i.e. people who worked someone else's land in return for payment); 1 worker in livestock, forestry, fishing, hunting, plantations, orchards, etc.; 0 in mining and quarrying; 0 household industry workers; 1 worker employed in other manufacturing, processing, service, and repair roles; 0 construction workers; 1 employed in trade and commerce; 0 employed in transport, storage, and communications; and 1 in other services.
