= Suratgarh Super Thermal Power Plant =

Thermal power station in India

Suratgarh super thermal power station
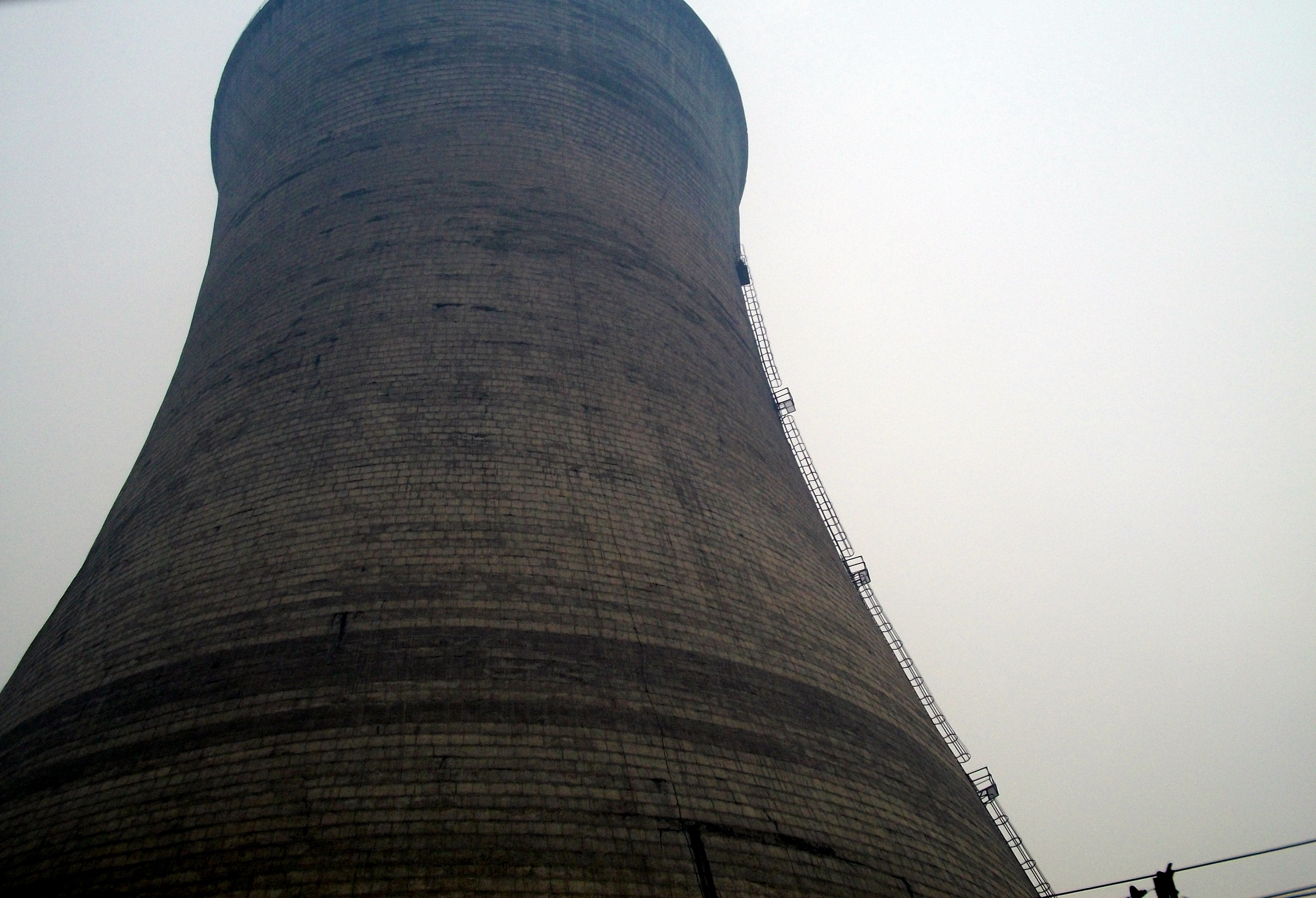
- Country: India
- Location: Suratgarh, Ganganagar, Rajasthan
- Coordinates: 29.1817°N 74.0194°E
- Status: Operational
- Commission date: 1998
- Operator: RVUNL

Thermal power station
- Primary fuel: Coal

Power generation
- Units operational: 6
- Nameplate capacity: 2820.00 MW

Suratgarh Super Thermal Power Station is Rajasthan's first super thermal power station. It is located 27 km away from Suratgarh town in Ganganagar district. The power plant is operated by Rajasthan Rajya Vidyut Utpadan Nigam Ltd (RVUNL). The power plant has 6 units that can produce 250 megawatt and 2 units can produce 660 MW.

== Awards ==
The plant received a gold shield on 8 August 2004 from Hon'ble President for consistently outstanding performance during the years 2000 to 2004. It also received a bronze shield from Hon' Prime Minister for outstanding performance during the years 2005 and 2006.

== Installed capacity ==
Following is the unit wise capacity of the plant.

Stage	Unit Number	Installed Capacity (MW)	Date of Commissioning	Status
Stage I	1	250	May 1998	Running
Stage I	2	250	March 2000	Running
Stage II	3	250	October 2001	Running
Stage II	4	250	March 2002	Running
Stage III	5	250	June 2003	Running
Stage IV	6	250	March 2009	Running
Stage V	7	660	March 2016	Running
Stage V	8	660	2016	Running

== See also ==
- Kota Super Thermal Power Plant
- Giral Lignite Power Plant
- Chhabra Thermal Power Plant
- Ramgarh Gas Thermal Power Station
