= Bhadu =

Bhadu may refer to:

- Bhadu (festival), a social festival of South Bengal, India
- Rajendar Singh Bhadu, Indian politician

== See also ==
- Bhadua, a village in West Bengal, India
