= Shankar Pannu =

Indian politician

Member of Parliament, Lok Sabha
- In office 10 March 1998 — 26 April 1999
- Preceded by: Nihalchand
- Succeeded by: Nihalchand
- Constituency: Ganganagar, Rajasthan

Personal details
- Born: 18 November 1949 (age 76)
- Party: Indian National Congress
- Spouse: Vimala Pannu

Shankar Pannu (18 November 1949) is an Indian politician who served as Member of Parliament in the Lok Sabha from Ganganagar. He is a member of Indian National Congress.
