= Raghunathan =

Raghunathan is a South Asian surname and patronymic. It is also variously spelled as Ragunathan. People with the name include:

- K. Raghunathan (born 1957), journalist and writer from India
- Madabusi Santanam Raghunathan FRS (born 1941), mathematician from India
- Mahaveer Raghunathan (born 1998), racecar driver from India
- Medha Raghunathan (born 1981), model and VJ from India
- Sudha Ragunathan (born 1957; née Venkatraman), Carnatic musician from India
- T. M. Chidambara Ragunathan (1923–2001), journalist and writer from India
- Viswanathan Raghunathan (born 1954), businessman, writer, academic, from India

== See also ==
- Appiah Balakrishnan, alias Ragunathan (died 1993), Sri Lankan assassin of Lalith Athulathmudali
- Ragunathan Rajkumar (born 1963), American computer engineering academic from India
- Raghunathan Srianand (born 1969), astronomer from India
- Raghunatha, a given name
- Raghunath (disambiguation)
