= Bharat Ram Meghwal =

Indian politician (born 1956)

Member of the Parliament, Lok Sabha
- In office 17 May 2009 — 18 May 2014
- Preceded by: Nihalchand
- Succeeded by: Nihalchand
- Constituency: Ganganagar

Personal details
- Born: 11 January 1956 (age 70) Alwar, Rajasthan
- Party: Indian National Congress
- Spouse: Geeta Meghwal
- Education: B.A., B.Ed.
- As of 12 November, 2024

Bharat Ram Meghwal (born 11 January 1956) is an Indian politician belonging to the Indian National Congress. He was elected to the 15th Lok Sabha, lower house of the Parliament of India from Ganganagar.
