= Dholpur Combined Cycle Power Station =

Dholpur Combined Cycle Power Station is a gas-based thermal power plant located near Dholpur, Rajasthan. The power plant is operated by the Rajasthan Rajya Vidyut Utpadan Nigam Ltd.

The EPC contractor for the project is BGR Energy Systems Ltd.

== Capacity ==
It has an installed capacity of 330 MW

Stage	Unit Number	Installed Capacity (MW)	Turbine type	Date of Commissioning	Status
1	1	110	Gas Turbine	2007 March	Running
1	2	110	Gas Turbine	2007 June	Running
1	3	110	Steam Turbine	2007 December	Running
