= Chhabra Thermal Power Plant =

Coal-fired power plant in Rajasthan, India

Chhabra Power Plant
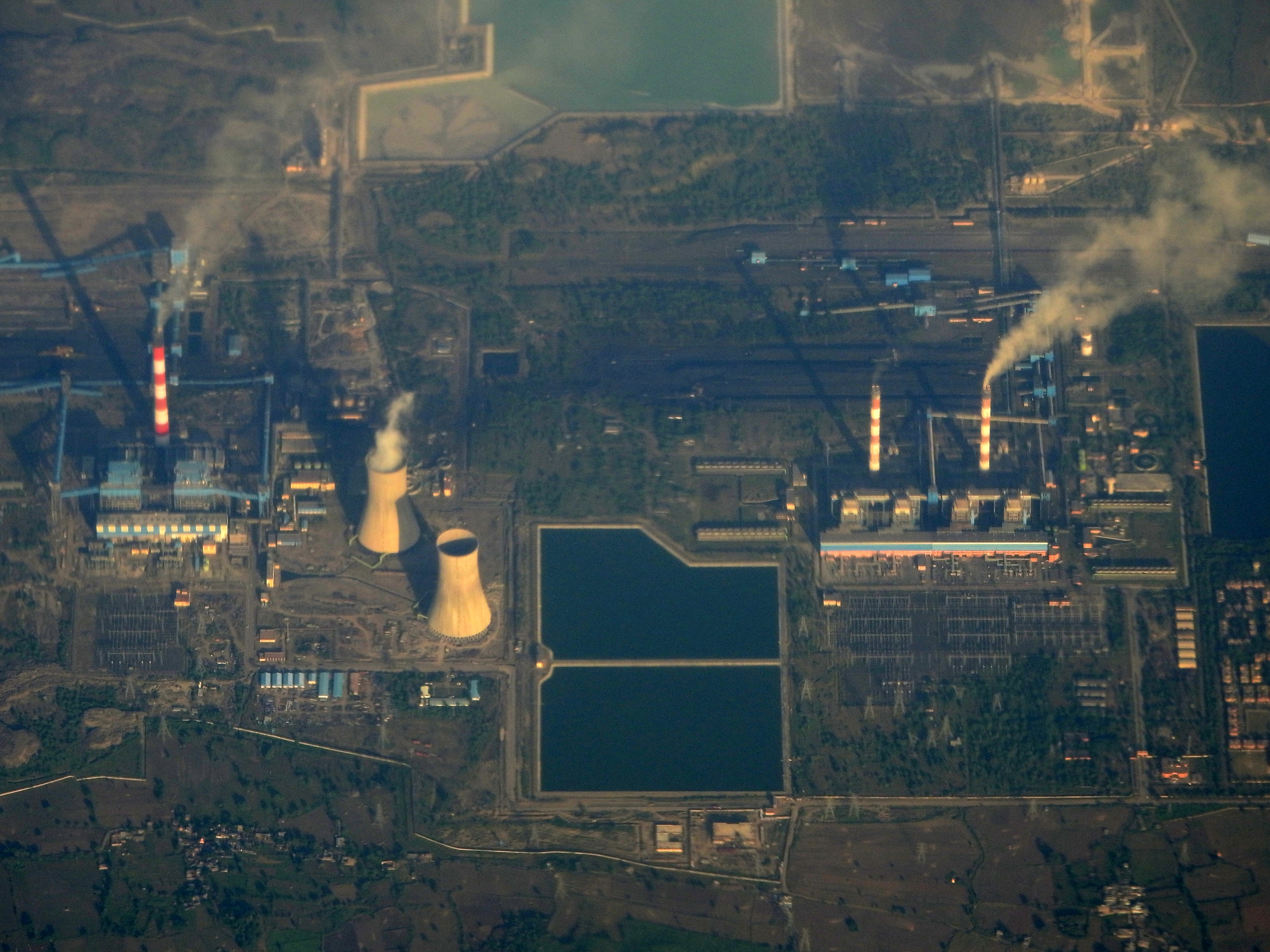
- Country: India
- Location: Chowki Motipura (Village), Baran, Rajasthan
- Coordinates: 24.6236°N 77.0383°E
- Status: Operational
- Commission date: 2010
- Operator: RVUNL

Thermal power station
- Primary fuel: Coal

Power generation
- Units operational: 6
- Nameplate capacity: 2320.00 MW

Chhabra Thermal Power Plant is one of Rajasthan's coal fired power plants. It is located at Chowki Motipura (Village) of tehsil Chhabra in Rajasthan's Baran district. The planned capacity of power plant is 2320 MW.

== Installed capacity ==
Stage	Unit Number	Installed Capacity (MW)	Date of Commissioning	Status
Stage I	1	250	October 2009	Running
Stage I	2	250	May 2010	Running
Stage II	3	250	December 2013	Running
Stage II	4	250	July 2014	Running
Stage III	5	660	October 2016	Running (EPC by L&T POWER)
Stage III	6	660	November 2018	(EPC BY L&T POWER) Running

== See also ==
- Suratgarh Super Thermal Power Plant
- Giral Lignite Power Plant
- Kota Super Thermal Power Plant
