= Khejri Hanuman Temple =

Hindu temple in Rajasthan

Religion
- Affiliation: Hinduism
- District: Ganganagar
- Deity: Hanuman
- Festival: Hanuman Jayanti

Location
- Location: Near Government College, Suratgarh, Ganganagar district, Rajasthan, India
- State: Rajasthan
- Country: India

Khejri Hanuman Temple situated near Government college Suratgarh in Ganganagar district in the Indian state of Rajasthan . It is one of the tourist attraction of the city. Every Tuesday and Saturday are busy days of week. On Hanuman Jayanti community kitchen is organised. Hanuman Khejri Temple also known for selfie zone due to its location on sand dunes. Public spend some time on nearby sand dunes.
