= Raghunatha =

Given name

Raghunatha is a given name. Notable people with the name include:

- Raghunatha Bhatta Goswami (1505–1579), disciple of the Vaishnava saint Chaitanya Mahaprabhu
- Raghunatha dasa Goswami, one of the principal disciples of the Vaishnava saint, Chaitanya Mahaprabhu
- Raghunatha Kilavan, the Setupati (commander) of Ramnad district in southern Tamil Nadu, India between 1673 and 1708
- Raghunatha Tirtha (died. 1502), Hindu philosopher and scholar; pontiff of Uttaradi Math of Dvaita Vedanta.
- Raghunatha Siromani (1477–1547), Indian philosopher and logician
- Raghunatha Tondaiman (1799–1839), the ruler of the princely state of Pudukkottai from 1825 to 1829
- Rajakumar Vijaya Raghunatha Thondaiman, Indian politician and former Member of the Legislative Assembly of Tamil Nadu
- Vijaya Raghunatha Raya Tondaiman II (1797–1825), the ruler of the princely state of Pudukkottai from 1807 to 1825
- Vijaya Raghunatha Tondaiman (1759–1807), the ruler of the kingdom of Pudukkottai from 1789 to 1807

== See also ==
- Raghunath (disambiguation)
- Raghunathan (surname)
