= Giral Lignite Power Plant =

Power station in Rajasthan, India

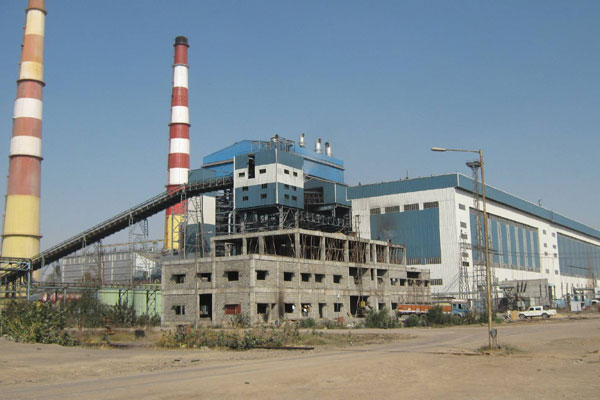
- Giral Lignite Power Limited
- Country: India
- Location: Thoombali, Barmer, Rajasthan
- Coordinates: 26.0425088°N 71.2506536°E
- Status: Operational
- Commission date: 2003
- Operator: RRVUNL

Thermal power station
- Primary fuel: Lignite coal
- Tertiary fuel: Heavy furnace oil (HFO), light diesel oil (LDO)

Power generation
- Units operational: 0
- Nameplate capacity: 250.00 MW

Giral Lignite Power Plant (GLPL) or Giral Lignite Thermal Power Station (GLTPP) is a wholly owned subsidiary of Rajasthan Rajya Vidyut Utpadan Nigam (RRVUNL). RRVUNL is a state government (Level 2 government in India) owned corporation working in the field of power generation.is located in Thoombali Village.

== Power plant ==
The thermal power station has an installed capacity of 250 MW. Two identical units of 125 MW each were built and commissioned by Senbo Engineering Limited (SEL) on EPC basis with an estimated cost of Rs. 1690 crores. This is a pit head plant.

The fuel is lignite coal, which is procured from the mines just behind the plant. The fuel is supplied by Rajasthan State Mines & Minerals Limited (RSMML). An additive to the fuel is limestone, which is added in pulverised form to the lignite, for the purpose of neutralising the sulphur oxides (SOx). Sulphur oxides are formed as a byproduct of combustion of lignite containing sulphur as its constituent. The limestone is also supplied by RSMML. The lignite cost is nearly Rs. 400 per MT. This is the first plant in the country which uses lime with lignite to control the SOX level.

The plant was developed in two stages.

== Installed capacity ==
| Stage | Unit number | Installed capacity (MW) | Date of commissioning | Status | COD |
|---|---|---|---|---|---|
| Stage I | 1 | 125 | February 2007 | Running | 18 December 2011 |
| Stage II | 2 | 125 | December 2008 | Running | 12 March 2011 |

== See also ==
- Suratgarh Super Thermal Power Plant
- Kota Super Thermal Power Plant
- Chhabra Thermal Power Plant
