= Rajasthan Rajya Vidyut Utpadan Nigam =

Electricity generation company in Rajasthan

RVUNL
- Company type: Government-owned corporation, PSU
- Industry: Electricity generation
- Founded: 2000
- Headquarters: Jaipur, India
- Key people: Shri R K Sharma, chairman and managing director
- Products: Electricity

Rajasthan Rajya Vidyut Utpadan Nigam Ltd (RVUNL) is the electricity generation company of the Government of Rajasthan state in India.

== History ==
Rajasthan Rajya Vidyut Utpadan Nigam Ltd has been entrusted with the job of development of power projects under state sector, in the state along with operation and maintenance of state-owned power stations by un-bundling the erstwhile RSEB. The Government of Rajasthan continued the RVUNL under the companies Act 1956 on 19 July 2000. The nigam is playing lead role in giving high priority to the power generation and manifold and rapid development of the state. The chairman and managing director is Shri P. Ramesh.

== Generation capacity ==
The installed capacity of RVUNL was as of December 2018 is 6831 MW.

=== Thermal ===
- Suratgarh Super Thermal Power Plant - 2820 MW (6x250 MW+660×2MW)
- Kota Super Thermal Power Plant - 1240 MW (2x110, 3x210, 2x195)
- Chhabra Thermal Power Plant - 1000 MW (4x250 MW)
- Kalisindh Thermal Power Station - 1200 MW (2x600 MW)
- Giral Lignite Power Plant - 250 MW (2x125 MW)
- Chhabra Super Critical Power Plant-1320 MW (2×660)

=== Gas ===
- Dholpur Combined Cycle Power Station - 330 MW (2x110 MW Gas Turbine, 1x110 MW Steam Turbine)
- Ramgarh Gas Thermal Power Station - 430 MW (1x35.5 MW GT, 1x37.5 MW GT, 1x37.5 MW ST, 1x110 MW GT,1x50 MW ST are running) whereas 1x160 MW (110 MW GT + 50 MW ST) is under planning stage.

=== Hydro ===
- Rana Pratap Sagar Dam - 172 MW (4x43 MW)
- Jawahar Sagar Dam - 99 MW (3x33 MW)
- Mahi Bajaj Sagar Dam - 140 MW (2x25 MW, 2x45 MW)
