= Suratgarh =

Suratgarh Sodhal (सोढल)
- City
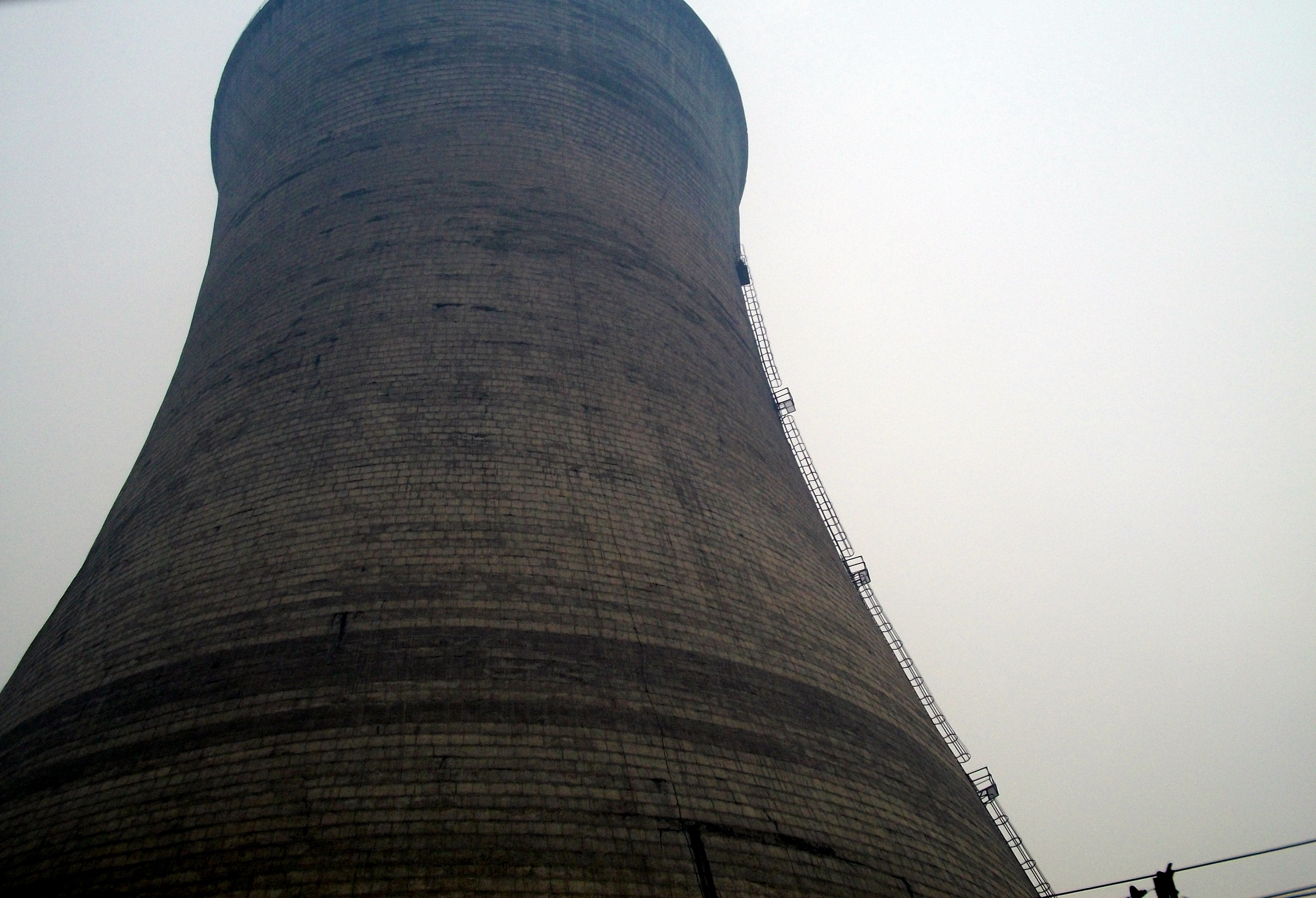
- Suratgarh thermal power in Suratgarh, Sri Ganganagar district, Rajasthan, India
- Nickname: Cotton City
- Location in Rajasthan, India
- Coordinates: 29°19′3.72″N 73°53′56.17″E
- Country: India
- State: Rajasthan
- District: Sri Ganganagar
- Founder: Raja Surat Singh (Bikaner)
- Named for: Raja Surat Singh

Government
  - Type: MLA
  - Body: Municipality
- Elevation: 168 m (551 ft)

Population (2011)
  - Total: 70,536

Languages Bagri, Rajasthani and Hindi
- Time zone: UTC+5:30 (IST)
- PIN: 335804
- Telephone code: 01509
- Vehicle registration: RJ 13

Suratgarh is a city/tehsil and a municipality in Sri Ganganagar district and is the biggest of the district's 7 tehsils. Suratgarh is also known as "Cotton city" and "Bowl of grain" of Rajasthan due to the high cotton and wheat production in this area. Suratgarh is 77 km away in South from it district headquarters just nearby Sri Ganganagar city in Sri Ganganagar district in the Indian state of Rajasthan. It was founded by Maharaja Surat Singh. Hindi, Bagri and Rajasthani are the widely spoken languages of the city.

== Geography ==
Suratgarh is located at 29.317701°N 73.898935°E. It has an average elevation of 168 metres (551) feet. It is a Northern Part of Thar desert. Seasonal Ghaghar river runs through Northern part of tehsil. Suratgarh has Greenary in Northern part and Desert called tibba in southern part. From tibbas near Hanuman khejri and Manaksar this difference can be seen.

== Demographics ==
As of the 2011 Indian Census, the Suratgarh Municipality has population of 70,536 of which 37,126 are males while 33,410 are females. Population of children with age of 0-6 is 9037 which is 12.81% of total population of Suratgarh (M). In Suratgarh Municipality, female sex ratio is of 900 against state average of 928. Moreover, child sex ratio in Suratgarh is around 861 compared to Rajasthan state average of 888. Literacy rate of Suratgarh city is 75.68% higher than state average of 66.11%. In Suratgarh, male literacy is around 83.19% while female literacy rate is 67.39%.

== Media ==
Akashwani Suratgarh broadcasts on 918 kHz with a 300 kW radio transmitter. It has been given the name "Cotton city channel". This channel can regularly also be listened in Central Europe around 30 minutes before local sunset until end of broadcast at 17:41 UTC and is the best heard Akashvani station in Central Europe broadcasting on medium wave.

== History ==
Suratgarh was a significant arena of historical incidents in the ancient past. The city was once called Sodal. Around 3000 BC Suratgarh is believed to have been a lush, green place due to the presence of two big rivers, Sarasvati and Drishadvati. Present sand possessed various botanical and zoological species within the basins of chaste Sarasvati and Drishvati. The emergence of Kalibangan and Barod civilizations were facilitated by the geographical and environmental complements of the Sarasvati, and Suratgarh was a noteworthy testimony of this. The traces of ancient civilization near Rangmahal, Manaksaar and Amarpura show the historical significance of Suratgarh where the Sarasvati civilization receded after 1500 years of stability.

Suratgarh developed greatly under the rule of Maharaja Ganga Singh who built a hunting lodge at Suratgarh and ensured the connectivity of Suratgarh to train service. Hanumangarh and Bikaner came under the Suratgarh District when the district was established. Establishment of the Ganges Canal in 1927 helped Suratgarh develop; it became a city after partition when various refugees from Pakistan came in and started settling there. Suratgarh Central State Farm was established in 1956, followed with the establishment of the Indira Gandhi Canal project and Central Animal Reproduction Farm in the 1960s. Meanwhile, an air and military base station, Akashvani and various offices had been established. Suratgarh Thermal Power Station secured by CISF started working from 3 November 1998 and this laid down one more milestone in the progress of Suratgarh city.

It has a thermal power plant of 1500 MW and a PLF of 93%, which has won an award for one of the best-operated plants in India. The industry experienced acute growth with the construction of the thermal power plant and its residential buildings. Since then the industry has been growing quickly. With the reducing demands as a result of completion of the thermal power plant project, bricks from Suratgarh are now supplied to various parts of Rajasthan especially to the districts of Churu and Jhunjhunu.

In 2019, CRPF training centre shifted from Suratgarh to Jodhpur. It was shifted here in 2014 on temporary basis.

On 22 Feb 2022, drugs disposed by Police which was confiscated in last 3 years part of campaign against drugs by Police.

On 8 May 2022, bomb found in Indira Gandhi Canal near Rajiasar during Neharbandi later secured by police safely defused by Army on 24 May 2022.

On 11 May 2022, BJP leader JP Nadda and Former CM of State Vasundhra Raje visited City.

NIA conducts searches in two locations in suratgarh on 26 January 2024.

The district was established on 7 August 2023.

== Governance ==
Dungar Ram Gedar is sitting MLA in 2023 succeeded MLA Rampratap Kasniyan from Suratgarh (Rajasthan Assembly Constituency). Rampratap Kasniyan also claimed the District status for Suratgarh tehsil which is old demand from area as distance from district city ganganagar is more. Citywide administration is coordinated by the Nagar Palika Suratgarh which chairmanship is reserved for Schedule Caste Category. Here is an SDM court, an ADM, ACJM, MJM and ADJ court. There is a Suratgarh General Government Hospital

There is also door to door Garbage collection system in place in city by Garbage truck.

New Underground Sewerage System is laid down in different phases in City.

There is an emergency security system to secure the city.

== Education ==
- Government College, Suratgarh
- Suratgarh PG College, Suratgarh
- Tagore PG College
- Government Senior Secondary, Suratgarh
- Bhatia Ashram
- Swami Vivekanand Government Model School
- Tagore Central Academy, Suratgarh
- Blossom Academy School, Suratgarh
- KV No. 1 Airforce Station, Suratgarh
- Suratgarh Public School, Suratgarh
- Delhi Public School, Suratgarh
- G-Help Suratgarh

== Weather and nature ==
Since Suratgarh lies within the fringes of the Thar Desert, the region has a hot desert climate with extremely hot summers and cool winters. The hottest months of the year are from April to October where the maximum temperatures remain above 118 °F (48 °C) and the average temperatures for the day remains above 95 °F (35 °C). On some days in the months of May, Jun and July the maximum temperatures regularly cross 122 °F (50 °C). Humidity remains below 50% throughout the year, and during the peak of summer and winter months, the humidity regularly falls below 20%. Due to its desert climate rainfall is sparse and happens during the two Monsoon seasons and the average rainfall across the year is less than 10 inches (25 cm). During the summer months dry winds blowing across the desert whip up dust storms which are common in the evening hours. Winters are generally mild with temperatures averaging around 55 °F (13 °C) with a few days in December and January with temperatures falling as low as 33 °F (1 °C). Yearly average UV index for the region is above 7 with the summer months approaching 10 throughout the day.

National bird Peacock found in villages. Rabbit, Chinkara, White deer and Nilgai are Native animals here. Flamingoes of Baropal Lake at distance of 20 km from city in east, seasonally it host migratory birds like Demoiselle cranes, bareheaded geese, spot bill ducks, mallard common teal, common pochard, pin tail, shoveller, tufted duck, wigeon and coots. Besides water birds this lake also host waders like avocet, green shank, little ring plover, red shank, curlews, sand pipers, black wing stilt. Nearby Gagghar depression also host seasonal migratory birds

Wild animal like Foxes and Jackals also found here.

== Places of interest in and around Suratgarh ==
- Khejri Hanuman Temple
- Kalibanga
- Suratgarh Super Thermal Power Station
- Suratgarh Air Force Station
- Suratgarh Military Station
- Suratgarh Railway Station among top clean railway station in India
- All India Radio Station Aakashwani
- Sodhal Fort
- Shri Ganesh Mandir Dhab – a Hindu temple
- Shree Cement Factory Udaipur
- Ghaghar river
- Badopal
- Padpata Dham Dhaban
- Central State Farm, Suratgarh largest mechanised Farm in South East Asia. It has Russian Machinery Museum.
- CISF
- Amruta Devi Park, Village Dabla
- Badopal lake

== Economy ==
There has been a constant boost to the economy with the presence of major defence stations and Suratgarh Thermal Power Station. Further development is provided by the presence of newly constructed cement production factories named as Shree Cement Ltd & Bangur cement unit that use ash from the thermal power plant, produce PPC, OPC & premium cement. Much of the local population depends on agricultural activities for their household income.

There is upcoming distillery plant in Suratgarh as EC is granted for 500 KLPD grain based distillery plant at Rayanwali.

There is Gypsum mining area's near Raghunathpura, Padampura, Thethar, Karnisar, kishanpura, and dhandhra villages. Gypsum is mined by FCI Aravali Gypsum & Minerals India Limited.

== Transport ==
Suratgarh Junction is on the Jodhpur-Bathinda line. Distance from surrounding cities: Bikaner − 174 km, Ganganagar − 70 km, Hanumangarh − 52 km The city is well connected with other cities by train and road networks. National Highway number 62 and a mega highway pass through the city. The city railway junction is 434.93 km from New Delhi railway junction. Its 8 hours journey from National capital by train route. 1257 km long Amritsar Jamnagar Expressway (NH-754) will pass from east of city. It is a 6 lane expressway and It's part from Hanumangarh district to Jalore district is inaugurated by PM on 8 July 2023.

== Culture ==
Suratgarh city is culturally diverse. Most of the people from the main city are either employed by the government or local merchants. The city has a traditional Bagri cultural element, but, not being far from Punjab and Punjabi speaking areas of western Haryana, there is also a rich influence of Punjabi culture. The presence of two major military garrisons of Indian Air Force, Indian Army, Super Thermal Power Plant, Suratgarh Junction railway station, CISF and Central State Farm has resulted in the area being home to multiple cultures from all across India. Due to security concerns cultural interactions between the civilian local residents and the military are extremely limited to senior administration officials.

Baba Ramdev ka mela on every dashmi of Bhadav sudi and Magh sudi at Temple of Baba Ramdev near Indira circle.

Hanuman Khejri Temple and nearby dunes remain crowded on Tuesday and Saturday.

Green Glob Awards 2022 attended by Bollywood actor Darshan Kumar. Five members of Punam foundation also get facilitated. Chief guest was Minister Ashwini Kumar Choubey.

== Sports ==
There is an infrastructure for the practice of sports such as cricket, football, badminton and basketball. The government college sports ground located at NH 62 highway provides a good platform for sport activities. Ankit Soni from district played in IPL with Gujrat Lions has opened an academy for cricket in suratgarh for development of sports in area with name Suratgarh school of cricket. Ankit Soni has made his debut in 2017.

Swimming

1. Mohanlaal resident of 5 GB, Jaitsar got three medals in 6th State level Para Swimming Competition held at SN Medical College, Jodhpur.

Archery

1. 14-year-old Laxmi Chaudhary a student of Blossom Academy School, Suratgarh selected for 68th National Archery Competition.

Cricket

1. Sherwood Cricket Academy
2. Suratgarh school of cricket by Ankit Soni
