= Suratgarh Assembly constituency =

Constituency of the Rajasthan legislative assembly in India

Coordinates: 29.31°N 73.91°E

Suratgarh
- Constituency No. 4 for the Rajasthan Legislative Assembly

Constituency details
- Country: India
- Region: North India
- State: Rajasthan
- District: Suratgarh District
- Established: 1957
- Reservation: None

Member of Legislative Assembly
- 16th Rajasthan Legislative Assembly
- Incumbent Dungar Ram Gedar
- Party: Indian National Congress
- Elected year: 2023

Suratgarh Assembly constituency is one of constituencies of Rajasthan Legislative Assembly in the Ganganagar (Lok Sabha constituency).

Suratgarh Constituency covers all voters from Suratgarh tehsil and part of Vijaynagar tehsil, which includes ILRC Jaitsar.

== Members of the Legislative Assembly ==
Year	Member	Party
1957	Raja Ram	Indian National Congress
1962	Manphool Singh	Indian National Congress
1967	Manphool Singh	Indian National Congress
1972	Yogendra Nath	Communist Party of India
1977	Gurusharan Chabbra	Janata Party
1980	Sunil Kumar Bishnoi	Indian National Congress (I)
1985	Hans Raj	Janata Party
1990	Sunil Kumar Bishnoi	Indian National Congress
1993	Amar Chand Middha	Bharatiya Janta Party
1998	Vijay Laxmi Bishnoi	Indian National Congress
2003	Ashok Nagpal	Bharatiya Janta Party
2008	Gangajal Meel	Indian National Congress
2013	Rajendar Singh Bhadu	Bharatiya Janata Party
2018	Rampratap Kasniyan	Bharatiya Janata Party
2023	Dungar Ram Gedar	Indian National Congress

== Election results ==
=== 2023 ===
2023 Rajasthan Legislative Assembly election: Suratgarh
Party	Candidate	Votes	%	±%
INC	Dungar Ram Gedar	116,841	55.87	▲25.12
BJP	Ram Pratap Kashniya	66,382	31.74	▼4.37
Independent	Rajender Singh Bhadu	9,826	4.7	
JJP	Prithviraj Meel	6,840	3.27	
BSP	Mahinder Singh Bhadoo	2,153	1.03	▼28.02
AAP	Liladhar	1,895	0.91	
NOTA	None of the above	1,717	0.82	▼0.01
Majority		50,459	24.13	▲18.77
Turnout		209,143	81.63	▼1.83
INC gain from BJP		Swing		

=== 2018 ===
2018 Rajasthan Legislative Assembly election: Suratgarh
Party	Candidate	Votes	%	±%
BJP	Rampratap Kasniyan	69,032	36.11	
INC	Hanuman Meel	58,797	30.75	
BSP	Dungar Ram Gedar	55,543	29.05	
NOTA	None of the above	1,591	0.83	
Majority		10,235	5.36	
Turnout		191,197	83.46	
BJP gain from		Swing		

== See also ==
- Member of the Legislative Assembly (India)
