= Pannalal Barupal =

Indian politician and independence activist (1913–1983)

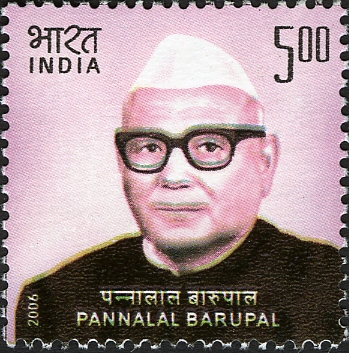

Member of Parliament, Lok Sabha
- In office 1952–1977
- Succeeded by: Bega Ram Chauhan
- Constituency: Ganganagar

Personal details
- Born: 6 April 1913 Bikaner, Rajasthan
- Died: 19 May 1983 (aged 70) Sri Ganganagar, Rajasthan
- Party: Indian National Congress
- Occupation: Politician

Pannalal Barupal (6 April 1913 – 19 May 1983) was an Indian politician, independence activist. He was member of the Lok Sabha representing Ganganagar constituency in Rajasthan state for five terms from 1952 to 1977. He was a member of the Indian National Congress.

== Career ==
He was born in Bikaner and actively participated in the non-cooperation movement and in the 1942 Quit India Movement. The Government of India issued a postage stamp in his honor on 28 April 2006. He was founder of the reformist organisation, Meghwal Sudhar Sabha.
