= Hanumangarh Assembly constituency =

Constituency of the Rajasthan legislative assembly in India

Coordinates: 29.58°N 74.33°E

Hanumangarh
- Constituency No. 8 for the Rajasthan Legislative Assembly

Constituency details
- Country: India
- Region: North India
- State: Rajasthan
- District: Hanumangarh district
- Established: 1957
- Reservation: None

Member of Legislative Assembly
- 16th Rajasthan Legislative Assembly
- Incumbent Javed Khan King
- Party: Independent
- Elected year: 2023

Hanumangarh Assembly constituency is one of constituencies of Rajasthan Legislative Assembly in the Ganganagar (Lok Sabha constituency).

Hanumangarh Constituency covers all voters from part of Hanumangarh tehsil, which includes ILRC Hanumangarh including Hanumangarh Municipal Board, ILRC Ronawali, ILRC Pucca Sarnan, IIRC Fatehgarh, ILRC Lakhuwali and ILRC Norangdesar.

== Members of Assembly ==
#	Name	Year	Party
1	Shoopat Singh Makasar	1957	Independent
2	Shoopat Singh Makasar	1962	Communist Party of India
3	B Prakash	1967	Indian National Congress
4	Ram Chandra Chaudhary	1972	Indian National Congress
5	Shoopat Singh Makasar	1977	Communist Party of India (Marxist)
6	Atam Ram	1980	Indian National Congress
7	Shoopat Singh Makasar	1985	Communist Party of India
8	Vinod Kumar Lilawali	1990	Indian National Congress
9	Ram Pratap	1993	Bharatiya Janata Party
10	Ram Pratap	1998	Bharatiya Janata Party
11	Vinod Kumar Lilawali	2003	Indian National Congress
12	Vinod Kumar Lilawali	2008	Indian National Congress
13	Ram Pratap	2013	Bharatiya Janata Party
14	Vinod Kumar Lilawali	2018	Indian National Congress
15	Javed Khan King	—	Independent
16	Ganesh Raj Bansal	2023	Independent
17	Javed Khan King	—	Independent
18	Ganesh Raj Bansal	2024	Independent
19	Javed Khan King	—	Independent

== Election results ==
=== 2023 ===
2023 Rajasthan Legislative Assembly election: Hanumangarh
Party	Candidate	Votes	%	±%
Independent	Ganeshraj Bansal	89,323		
BJP	Amit Sahu	79,625		
INC	Javed Khan King	59,366		
NOTA	None of the Above			
Majority		9,698		
Turnout				
Independent gain from INC		Swing		

=== 2018 ===
2018 Rajasthan Legislative Assembly election: Hanumangarh
Party	Candidate	Votes	%	±%
INC	Vinod Kumar	111,207		
BJP	Rampratap	95,685		
NOTA	None of the Above			
Majority		15,522		
Turnout				
INC gain from BJP		Swing		

== See also ==
- Member of the Legislative Assembly (India)
