= Kuldeep Indora =

Indian politician and Member of the Lok Sabha

Member of Parliament, Lok Sabha
- Incumbent
- Assumed office 4 June 2024
- Preceded by: Nihalchand Meghwal
- Constituency: Ganganagar

Personal details
- Born: 30 October 1969 (age 56)
- Party: Indian National Congress

Kuldeep Indora (born 30 October 1969) is an Indian politician who has served as a Member of Parliament from the Ganganagar Lok Sabha constituency in Rajasthan. He is a member of the Indian National Congress.

== Political career ==
Indora contested the 2024 Indian general election from the Ganganagar (SC) parliamentary constituency as a candidate of the Indian National Congress.

He was elected to the 18th Lok Sabha from Ganganagar, defeating Priyanka Balan Meghwal of the Bharatiya Janata Party by 88,153 votes. Indora received 726,492 votes, while Meghwal received 638,339 votes.

The Returning Officer declared Indora elected from the Ganganagar (SC) parliamentary constituency on 4 June 2024.

== Electoral performance ==
2024 Indian general election: Ganganagar
Candidate	Party	Votes	Result
Kuldeep Indora	INC	726,492	Elected
Priyanka Balan Meghwal	BJP	638,339	Runner-up

Indora was elected from the Ganganagar constituency with a majority of 88,153 votes.
