= Kota Super Thermal Power Plant =

Power station in India

Kota Thermal Power Plant
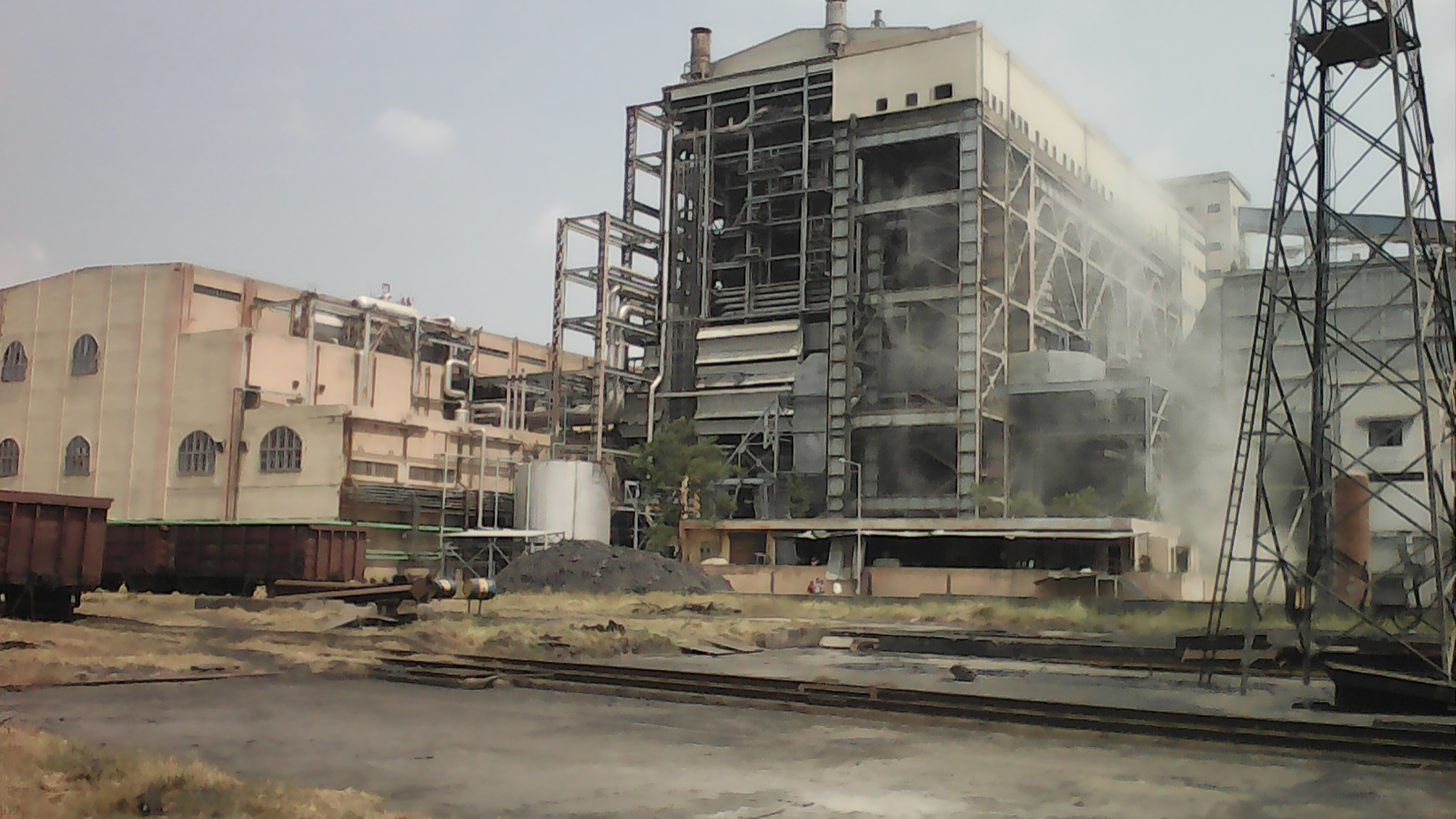
- Country: India
- Location: Kota, Kota, Rajasthan
- Coordinates: 25.1717°N 75.8169°E
- Status: Operational
- Commission date: 1983
- Operator: RVUNL

Thermal power station
- Primary fuel: Coal

Power generation
- Units operational: 7
- Nameplate capacity: 1240.00 MW

Kota Thermal Power Plant is Rajasthan's first major coal-fired power plant. It is located on the west bank of the Chambal River in Kota.

== Power plant ==
Kota Thermal Power Station has received Meritories productivity awards during 1984, 1987, 1989, 1991 and every year since 1992 onwards.

== Installed capacity ==
Stage	Unit number	Installed capacity (MW)	Date of commissioning	Status
Stage I	1	110	January 1983	Running
Stage I	2	110	January 1983	Running
Stage II	3	210	September 1988	Running
Stage II	4	210	May 1989	Running
Stage III	5	210	March 1994	Running
Stage IV	6	195	July 2003	Running
Stage V	7	195	May 2009	Running

== Features ==
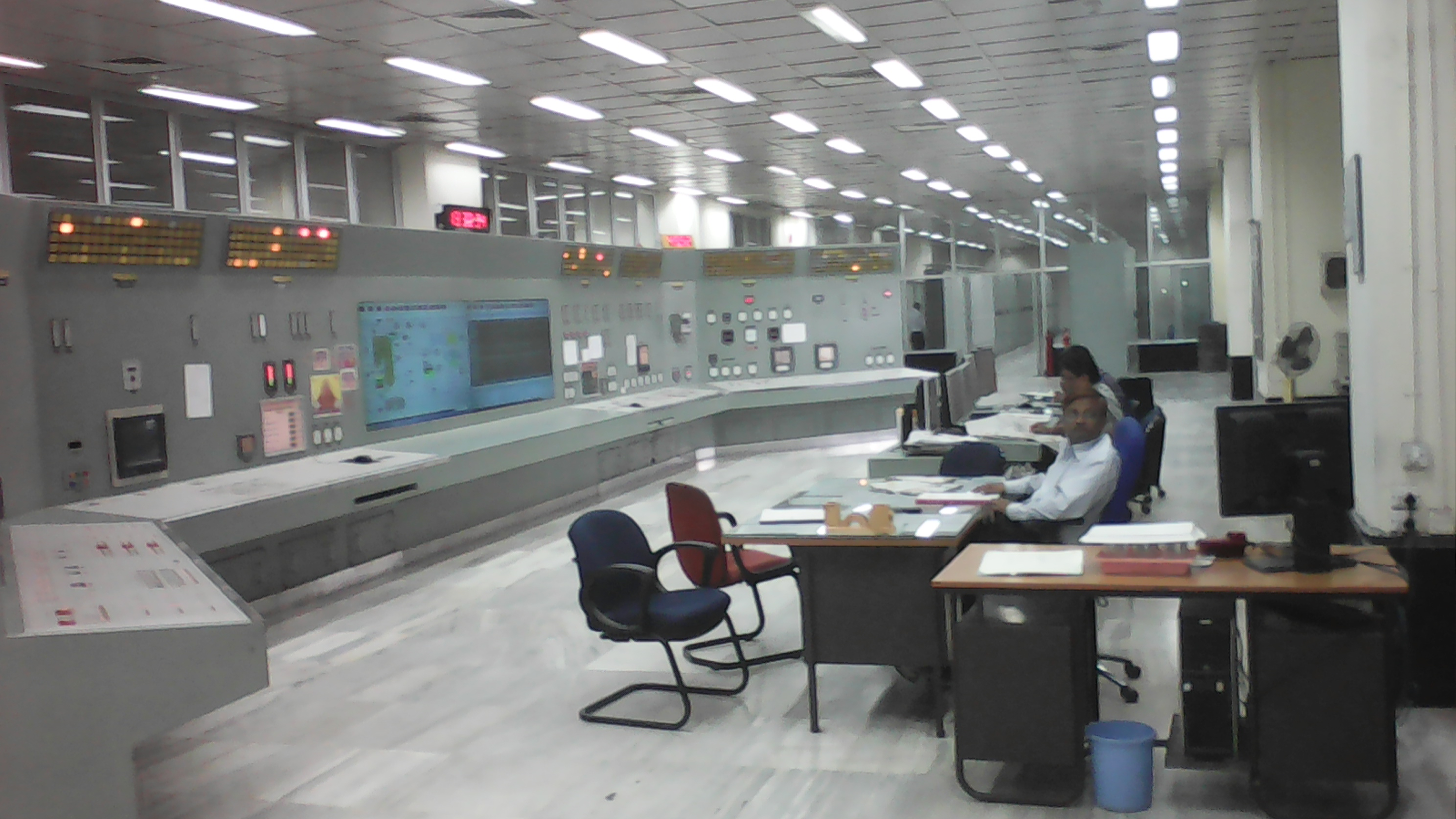
Control room

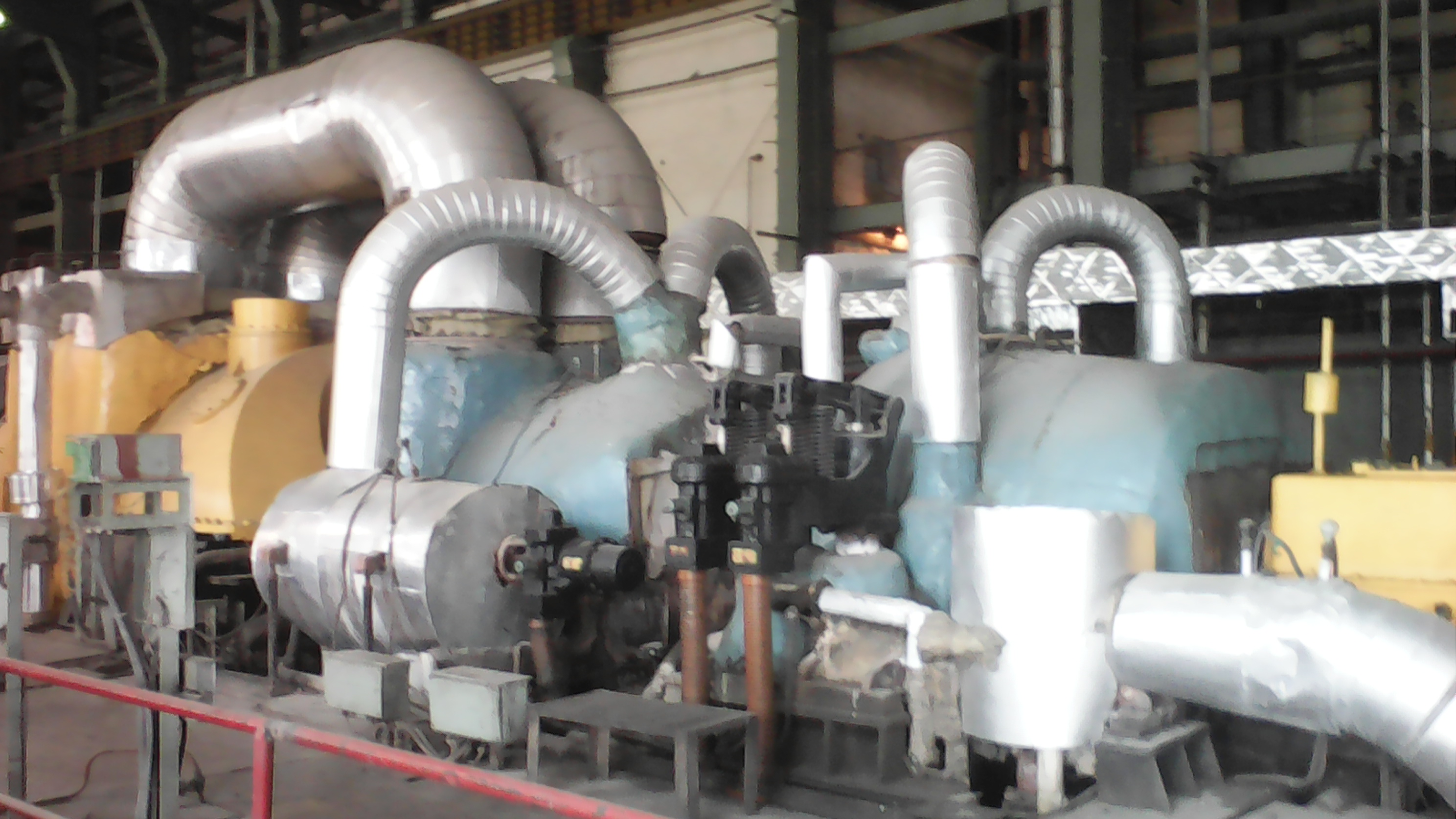
Boiler generator turbine assembly

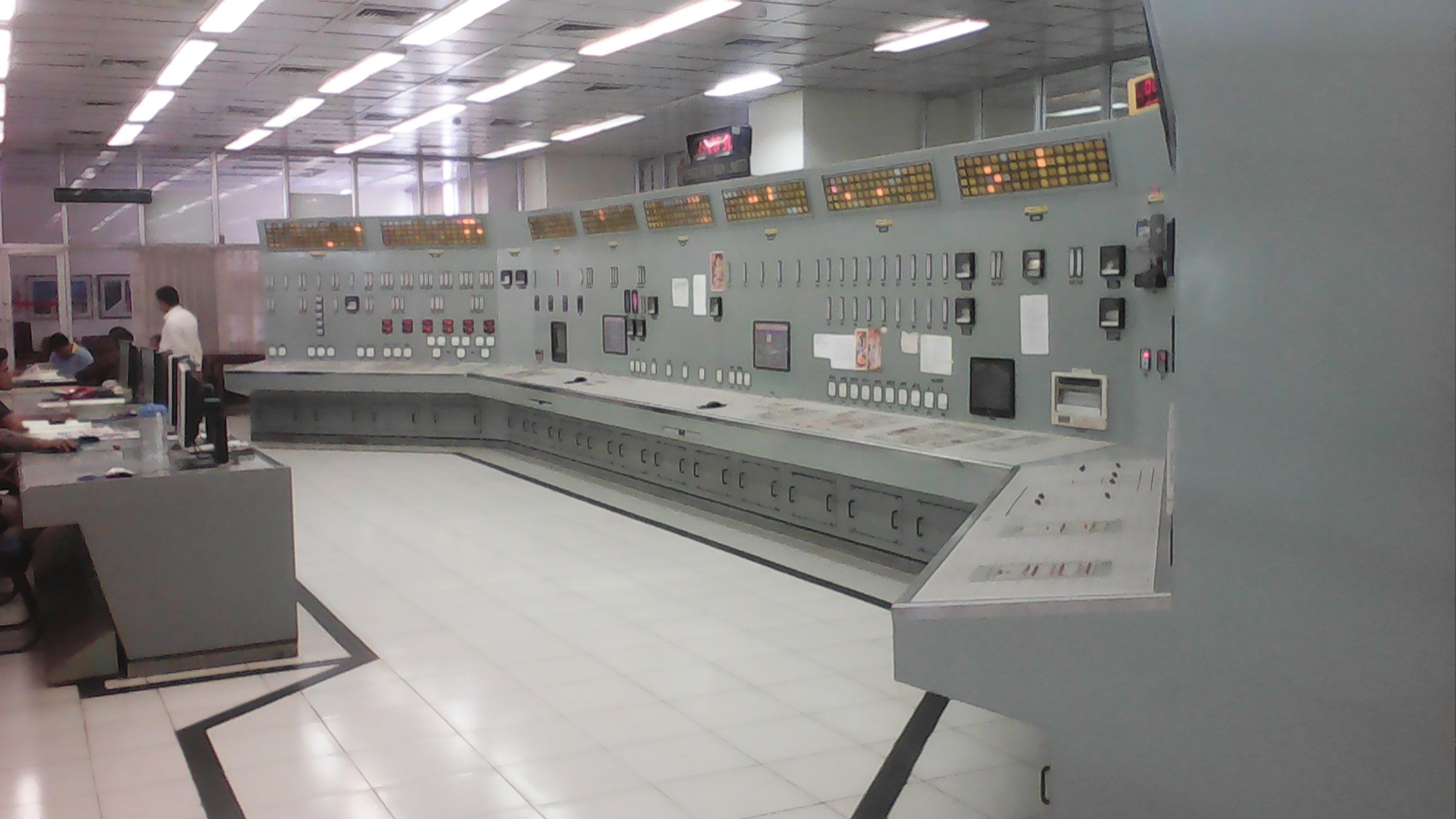
Fully automated control room

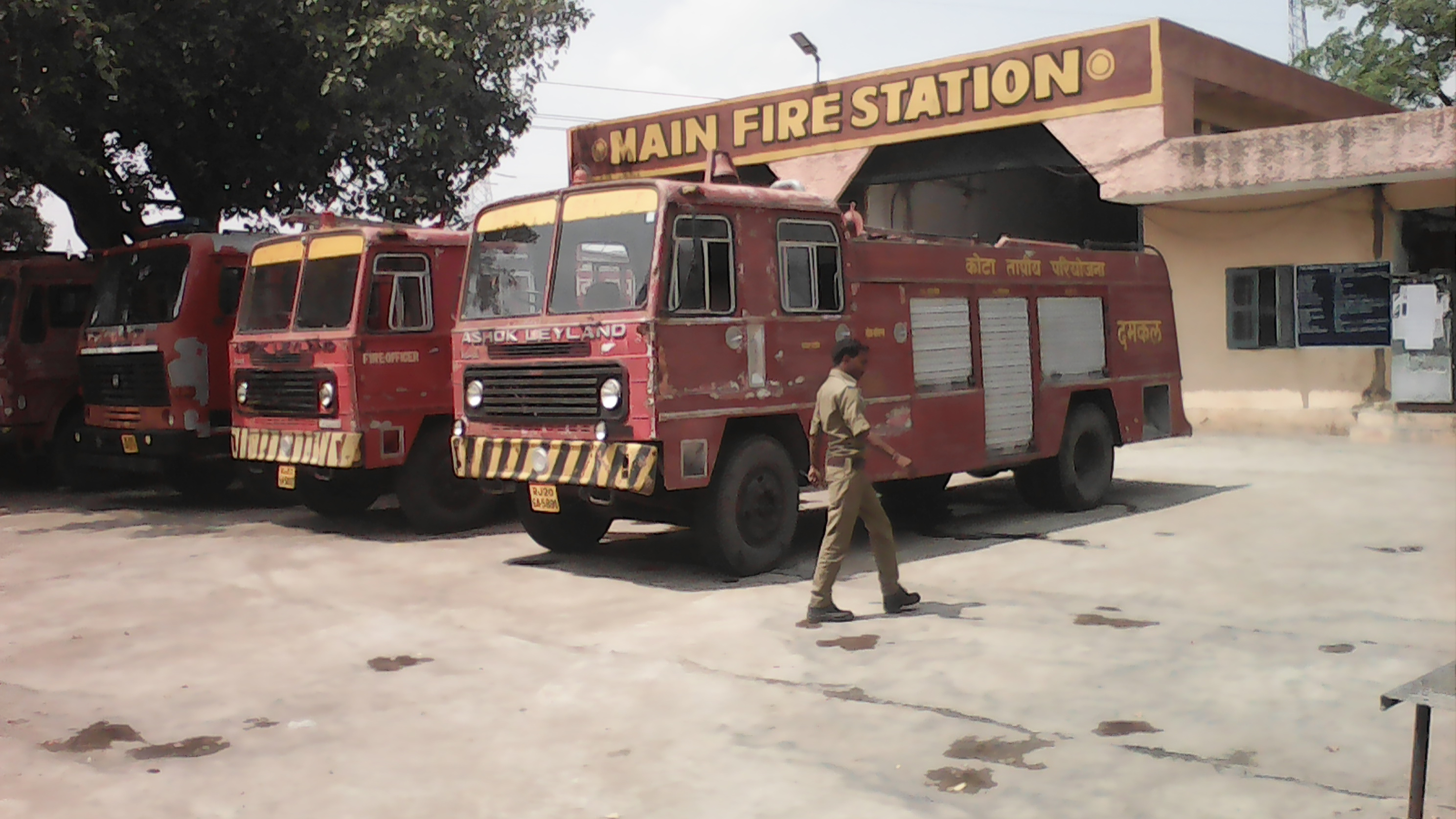
Fire station

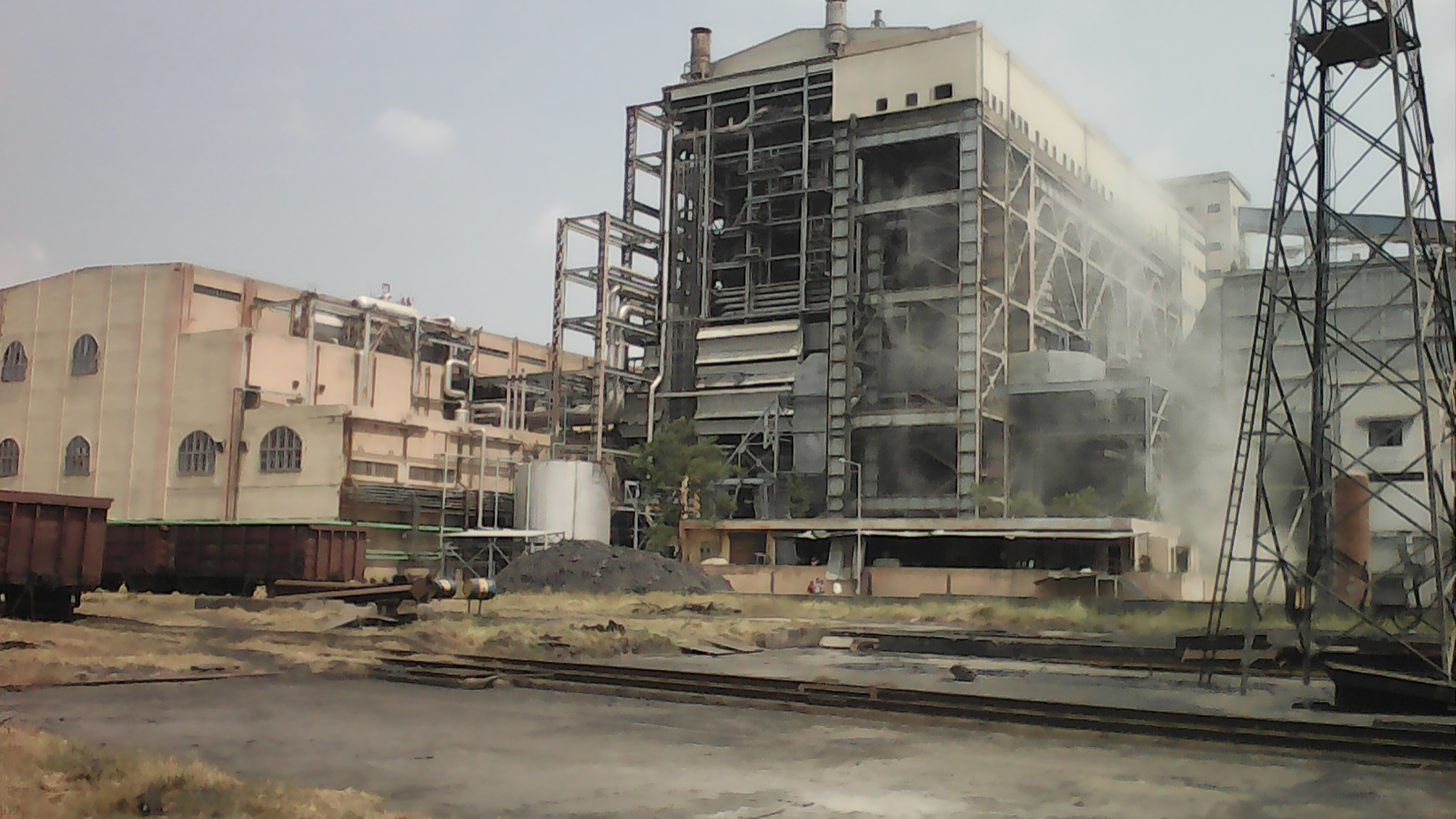
Side view

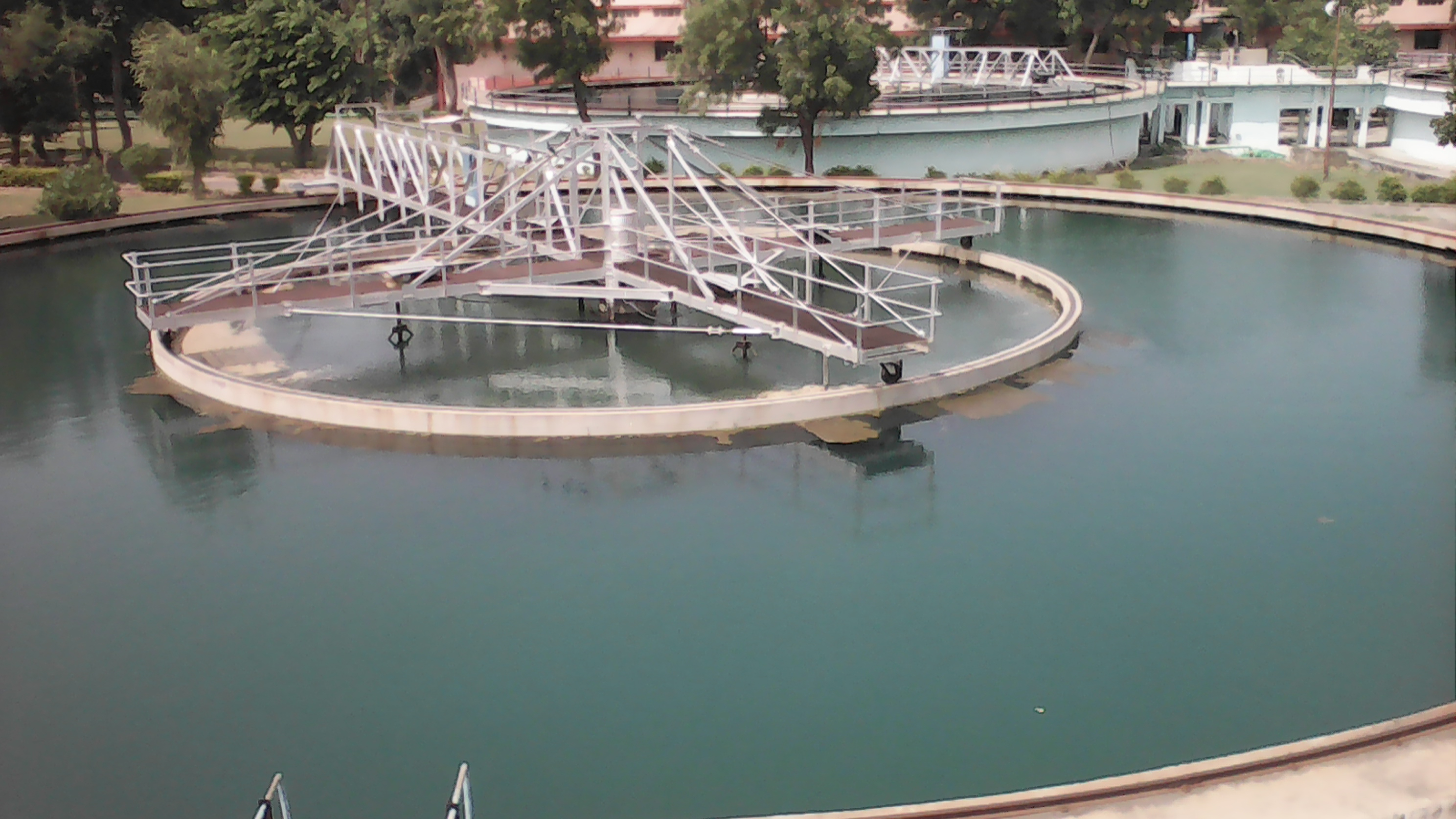
Flocculator tank

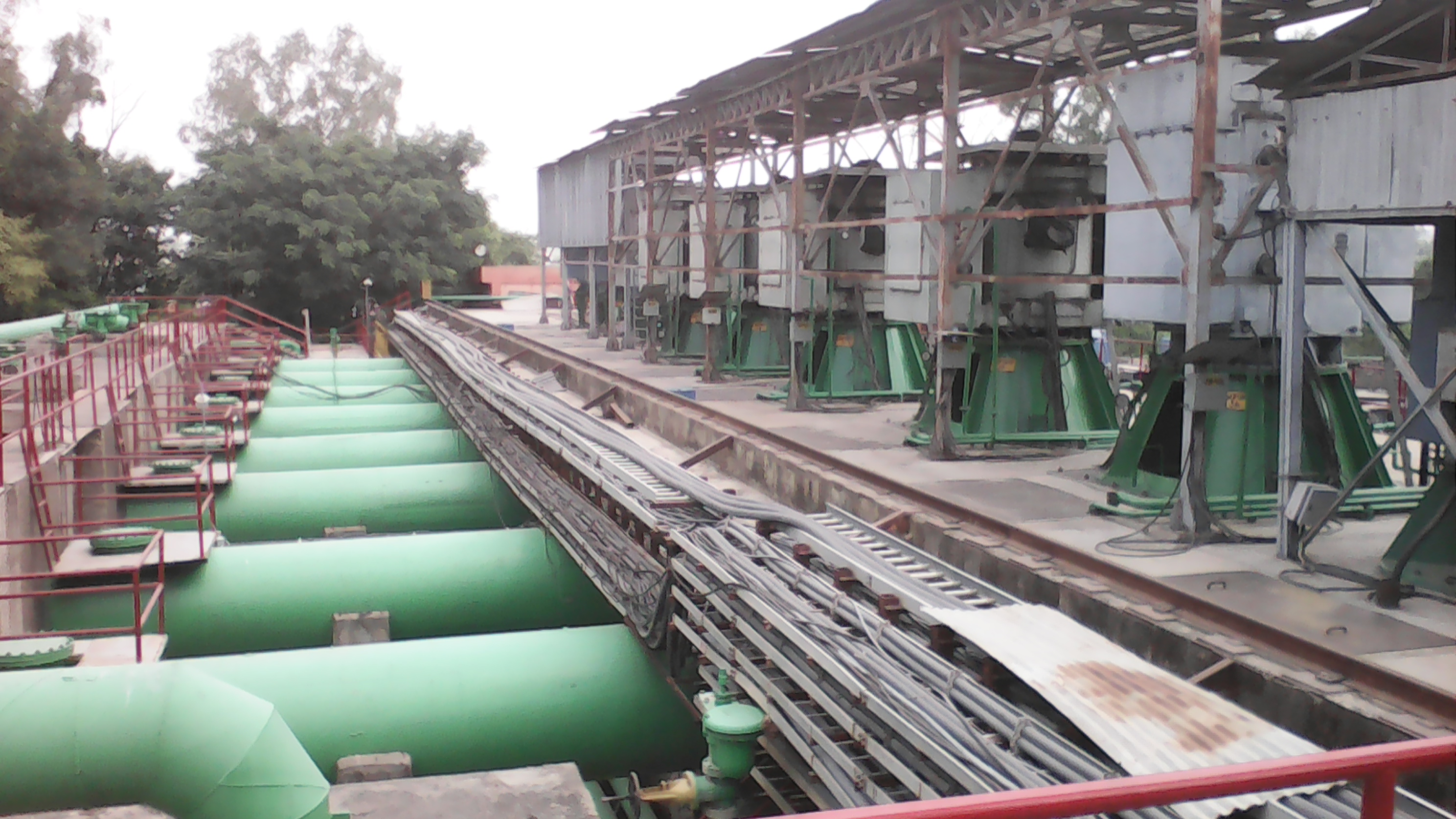
Pumps for water circulation

== See also ==
- Suratgarh Super Thermal Power Plant
- Giral Lignite Power Plant
- Chhabra Thermal Power Plant
