= Sadulshahar Assembly constituency =

Constituency of the Rajasthan legislative assembly in India

Coordinates: 29.91°N 74.17°E

Sadulshahar
- Constituency No. 1 for the Rajasthan Legislative Assembly

Constituency details
- Country: India
- Region: North India
- State: Rajasthan
- District: Sri Ganganagar district
- Lok Sabha constituency: Ganganagar
- Established: 2008
- Reservation: None

Member of Legislative Assembly
- 16th Rajasthan Legislative Assembly
- Incumbent Gurveer Singh Brar
- Party: Bharatiya Janata Party
- Elected year: 2023

Sadulshahar Assembly constituency is one of the constituencies of Rajasthan Legislative Assembly in the Ganganagar Lok Sabha constituency.

== Members of Legislative Assembly ==
Year	Member	Party
Till 2013 : Constituency did not exist
2013	Gurjant Singh	Bharatiya Janata Party
2018	Jagdish Chander	Indian National Congress
2023	Gurveer Singh Brar	Bharatiya Janata Party

== Election results ==
=== 2023 ===
2023 Rajasthan Legislative Assembly election: Sadulshahar
Party	Candidate	Votes	%	±%
BJP	Gurveer Singh Brar	74,433	37.58	▲3.22
Independent	Om Bishnoi	58,973	29.77	▲9.87
INC	Jagdish Chander	57,999	29.28	▼10.31
AAP	Gurvinder Kour	1,925	0.97	
NOTA	None of the above	1,162	0.59	▼0.3
Majority		15,460	7.81	▲2.58
Turnout		198,085	82.63	▼2.62
BJP gain from INC		Swing		

=== 2018 ===
Rajasthan Legislative Assembly Election, 2018: Sadulshahar
Party	Candidate	Votes	%	±%
INC	Jagdish Chander	73,165	39.59	
BJP	Gurveer Singh Brar	63,498	34.36	
Independent	Om Bishnoi	36,772	19.9	
CPI(M)	Pala Ram	2,602	1.41	
CPI	Avtar Singh	1,764	0.95	
Abhinav Rajasthan Party	Balwant Nimiwal	1,744	0.94	
NOTA	None of the above	1,641	0.89	
Majority		9,667	5.23	
Turnout		184,797	85.25	
INC gain from BJP		Swing		

== See also ==
- Member of the Legislative Assembly (India)
