= Raghunathpur, Raebareli =

Raghunathpur Raghunāthpur
- Village
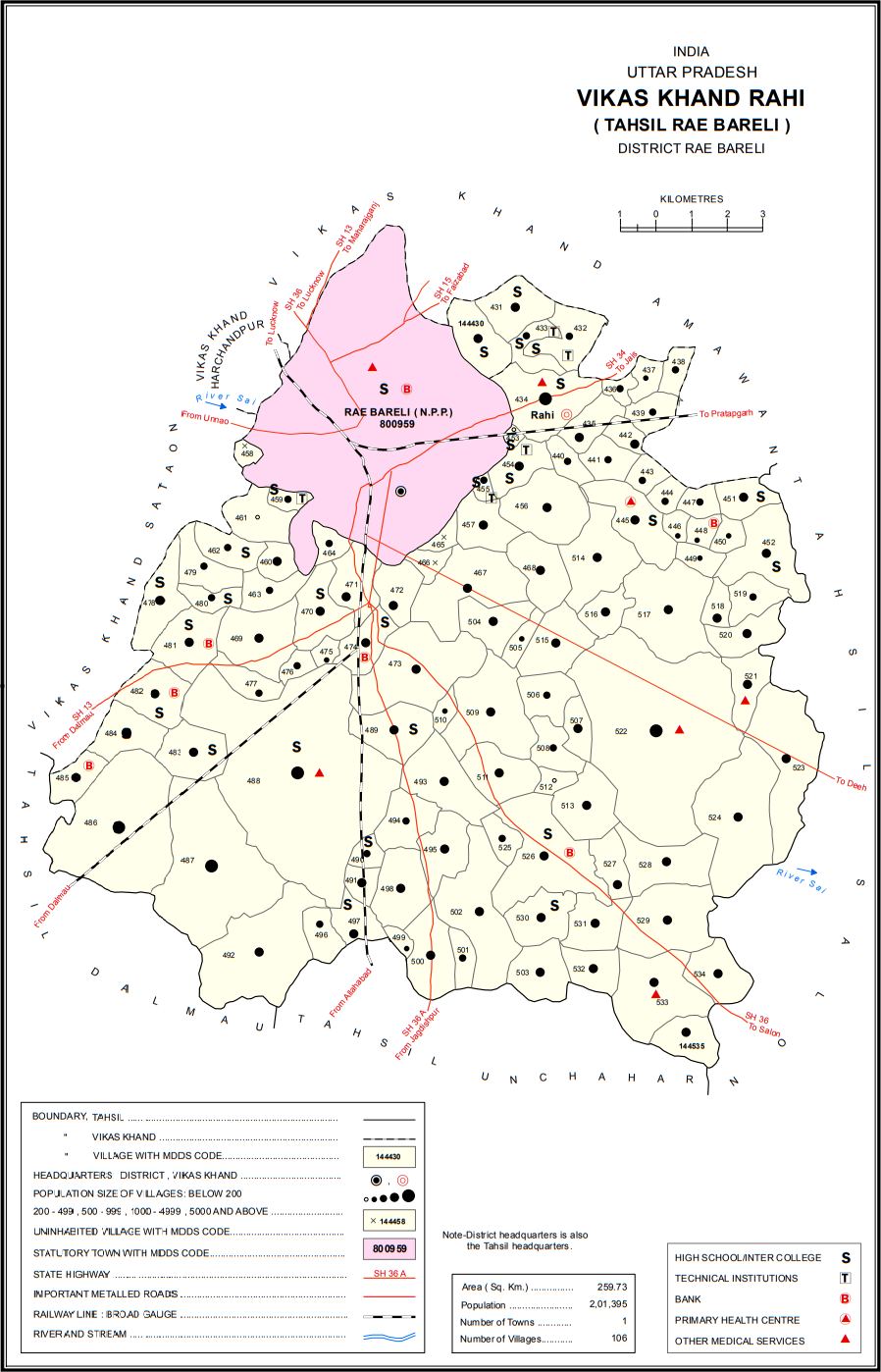
- Map showing Raghunathpur (#504) in Rahi CD block

- Location in Uttar Pradesh, India
- Coordinates: 26.183095°N 81.285709°E
- Country: India
- State: Uttar Pradesh
- District: Raebareli

Area
  - Total: 1.572 km^{2} (0.607 sq mi)

Population (2011)
  - Total: 1,217
  - Density: 774.2/km^{2} (2,005/sq mi)

Languages
  - Official: Hindi
- Time zone: UTC+5:30 (IST)
- Vehicle registration: UP-35

Raghunathpur is a village in Rahi block of Rae Bareli district, Uttar Pradesh, India. It is located 11 km from Rae Bareli, the district headquarters. As of 2011, it has a population of 1,217 people, in 207 households. The village has one primary school, no medical facilities and does not host a weekly haat or a permanent market. It belongs to the nyaya panchayat of Bhadokhar.

The 1951 census recorded Raghunathpur as comprising 7 hamlets, with a total population of 441 people (229 male and 212 female), in 92 households and 81 physical houses. The area of the village was given as 415 acres. 12 residents were literate, all male. The village was listed as belonging to the pargana of Rae Bareli South and the thana of Kotwali.

The 1961 census recorded Raghunathpur as comprising 7 hamlets, with a total population of 459 people (253 male and 206 female), in 92 households and 88 physical houses. The area of the village was given as 415 acres.

The 1981 census recorded Raghunathpur as having a population of 682 people, in 123 households, and having an area of 167.55 hectares. The main staple foods were listed as wheat and rice.

The 1991 census recorded Raghunathpur as having a total population of 863 people (470 male and 393 female), in 146 households and 143 physical houses. The area of the village was listed as 168 hectares. Members of the 0-6 age group numbered 200, or 23% of the total; this group was 57% male (113) and 43% female (87). Members of scheduled castes numbered 176, or 20% of the village's total population, while no members of scheduled tribes were recorded. The literacy rate of the village was 34% (241 men and 50 women). 186 people were classified as main workers (181 men and 5 women), while 203 people were classified as marginal workers (32 men and 171 women); the remaining 274 residents were non-workers. The breakdown of main workers by employment category was as follows: 97 cultivators (i.e. people who owned or leased their own land); 16 agricultural labourers (i.e. people who worked someone else's land in return for payment); 7 workers in livestock, forestry, fishing, hunting, plantations, orchards, etc.; 0 in mining and quarrying; 1 household industry workers; 12 workers employed in other manufacturing, processing, service, and repair roles; 22 construction workers; 1 employed in trade and commerce; 7 employed in transport, storage, and communications; and 23 in other services.
