= Nihalchand =

Indian politician

Nihal Chand
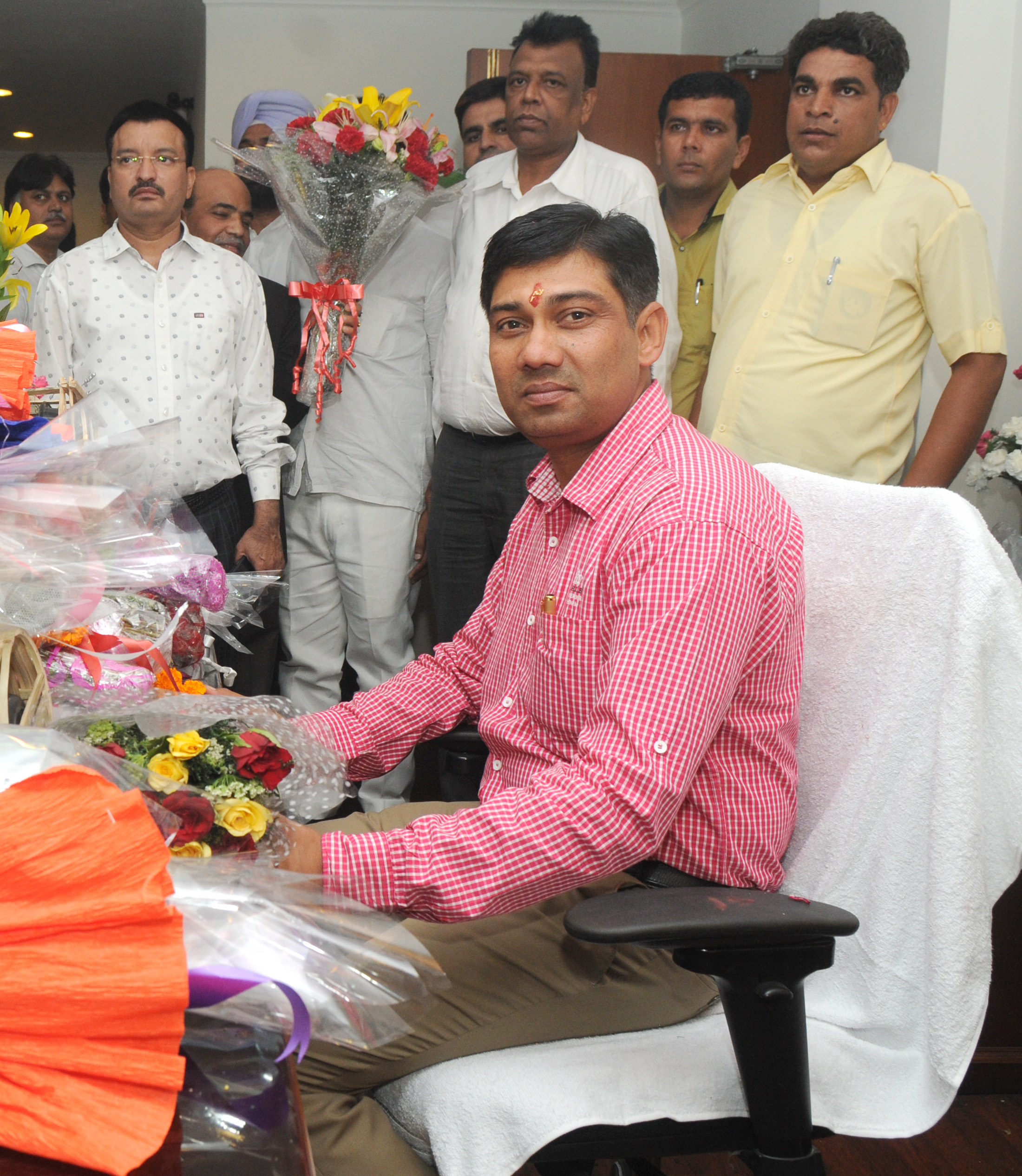

Minister of state for Panchayati Raj
- In office 9 November 2014 – 5 July 2016
- Prime Minister: Narendra Modi
- Minister: Birender Singh
- Preceded by: Upendra Kushwaha
- Succeeded by: Parshottam Rupala

Minister of state for Chemicals & Fertilizers
- In office 26 May 2014 – 9 November 2014
- Prime Minister: Narendra Modi
- Minister: Ananth Kumar
- Succeeded by: Hansraj Ahir

Member of Parliament, Lok Sabha
- In office 2014 – 4 June 2024
- Preceded by: Bharat Ram Meghwal
- Succeeded by: Javed Khana
- Constituency: Ganganagar
- In office 1999–2009
- Preceded by: Shankar Pannu
- Succeeded by: Bharat Ram Meghwal
- Constituency: Ganganagar
- In office 1996–1998
- Preceded by: Birbal Ram
- Succeeded by: Shankar Pannu
- Constituency: Ganganagar

Personal details
- Born: 4 February 1971 (age 55) Bajuwala, Ganganagar, Rajasthan, India
- Citizenship: Indian
- Party: Bharatiya Janata Party
- Spouse: Jyoti Chauhan (m. 1992)
- Children: 1 son and 1 daughter
- Parents: Bega Ram Chauhan (father); Surji Devi (mother)
- Alma mater: University of Bikaner
- Occupation: Agriculturist, Social Worker

Nihal Chand Chauhan also known as Nihal Chand Meghwal (born 4 February 1971) is an Indian politician belonging to the Bharatiya Janata Party.

== Early life ==
Nihal Chand was born to Bega Ram Chauhan, a two-time M.P of Ganganagar and Surji Devi into Meghwal community. He completed B.A from Shri Nehru S.P Evening College at Bikaner, Rajasthan. He married Jyoti Chauhan in 1992.

== Political career ==
In 1995, at the age of 24, Nihal Chand was elected as the "Panchayat Director" of Nanuwala, Sardarpura Bika and Bagicha. He was also elected as the pradhan (chief) of the Raisinghnagar panchayat committee. In 1996, he became the youngest Member of Parliament (MP) from Rajasthan at the age of 25. He was elected to the 11th Lok Sabha (lower house of the Parliament of India) on a BJP ticket from Ganganagar. In the next general election in 1998, he was defeated by Shankar Pannu of Congress.

After his defeat in the general election, Nihal Chand contested the Rajasthan Legislative Assembly elections. He was declared as BJP's candidate from Raisinghnagar. However, just before the elections, BJP formed an alliance with Haryana Rastriya Lokdal (HRLD), and gave that seat to HRLD. Nihal Chand was asked to withdraw his candidature, but he refused to do so. As a result, BJP expelled him. Contesting on the BJP election symbol, Nihal Chand won the seat and became an MLA from Raisinghnagar.

Subsequently, Nihal Chand won the 1999 and 2004 general elections from Ganganagar as a BJP candidate. In 2008, he lost the Assembly elections to Daulat Raj of Congress from Raisinghnagar. In 2009, he lost the Indian general elections to Bharat Ram Meghwal of Congress. In 2014, he defeated Bhanwarlal Meghwal of Congress on the same seat. He served as a Minister of state (MOS) in the Cabinet of Prime Minister Narendra Modi from May 2014 to July 2016.

== Controversy ==
In 2011, Nihal Chand's name appeared as one of the 17 accused in a police FIR. The complainant, a woman from Sirsa, Haryana, alleged that her husband Om Prakash Godara had drugged her and then let his associates rape her in Jaipur. After a year of investigation, the police closed the case in 2012, calling the charges as false and fabricated. The woman approached the trial court, which accepted the police report and dismissed the protest petition filed by her. The woman then approached the district court, which also dismissed the charges. In 2014, a few days after Nihal Chand was made the minister, the complainant went in for revision, following which the district court issued notices to Nihal Chand and 16 others, asking them to respond to the court. This caused a controversy, with the opposition party Congress demanding Nihal Chand's resignation. BJP refused to oblige, pointing out that Nihalchand was given a "clean chit" in the case when Congress was in power in Rajasthan.
