= Thoombali =

Village in Rajasthan, India

- Village
- Location in Rajasthan, India Thoombali (India)
- Coordinates: 26°02′29″N 71°16′00″E
- Country: India
- State: Rajasthan
- District: Balotra district

Government
  - Type: Democratic
  - Body: Village

Population (2011)
  - Total: 1,312

Languages
  - Official: Hindi/Marwadi
- Time zone: UTC+5:30 (IST)
- Nearest city: Jodhpur, Balotra

Thoombaliis village located in the Sheo Tehsil of the Barmer district in Rajasthan, India.The region is particularly known for animal husbandry (especially camel milk production).

Thoombali village is widely recognized for housing the Giral Lignite Power Plant, a major thermal power station in the region that utilizes locally mined lignite (brown coal) to generate electricity.
