= Badopal =

- Village
- Interactive map of Badopal
- Location in haryana, India Badopal (India)
- Coordinates: 29°21′30″N 74°4′49″E
- Country: India
- State: Rajasthan
- District: Hanumangarh

Languages
- Time zone: UTC+5:30 (IST)

Badopal is a village in Pilibanga tehsil of Hanumangarh District in the Indian state of Rajasthan.

== Archaeological Importance ==
Badopal is an ancient mound situated approximately 11 km northeast of Rang Mahal, with a diameter of about 350 m and a flat top rising about 4.5 m above nearby agricultural fields. The mound, a prominent site of the Rang Mahal culture, has yielded sherds featuring coarse painted floral designs and fragments of miniature balls adorned with careful relief ornamentation. Additionally, terracotta sculptures from Badopal to Rangmahal, now housed in the Bikaner Museum, likely originated from Hindu temples built around 200 CE. These sculptures, influenced by Shaivism and Krishna-Gopala Sect, exhibit similarities to the Mathura school rather than the Gandhara school.

== Demographics ==
Badopal is located at 29°21'30"N 74°4'49"E.

== Importance ==
Badopal is famous for the saltwater lake. A variety of birds species are found in the Badopal Lake. Around eighty one species of birds have been recorded here as of 2002. Flamingo is most well known migratory bird that come in the winter season. Terracota of the early Gupta period are excavated in the ancient Theris found in the village and the ancient terracotta of Badopal, Rrajasthan is known from that time.

== Transport ==
Badopal lies on Suratgarh-Rawatsar road. It can be reached from Hanumangarh, Pilibangan, Suratgarh and Rawatsar. There are buses available to Badopal village.

=== Railways ===
Suratgarh is the nearest major railway station to Badopal village.

== See also ==
- Kalibangan
- Pilibanga
- Hanumangarh
- Suratgarh
- Bikaner
