= Bega Ram Chauhan =

Indian politician

Member of Parliament, Lok Sabha
- In office 1989–1991
- Preceded by: Birbal Ram
- Succeeded by: Birbal Ram
- In office 1977–1980
- Preceded by: Pannalal Barupal
- Succeeded by: Birbal Ram
- Constituency: Ganganagar, Rajasthan.

Personal details
- Born: 1937 (age 88–89)
- Party: Janata Dal
- Other political affiliations: Janata Party
- Spouse: Surji Devi

Bega Ram Chauhan is an Indian politician. He was elected to the Lok Sabha, the lower house of the Parliament of India from Ganganagar, Rajasthan as a member of the Janata Dal.
