= Raghunath =

Raghunath or Ragunath may refer to:

- Rama, the Hindu deity, lord (natha) of the Raghu dynasty

== Places ==
- Raghunath Temple, one of the largest temple complexes of north India located in Jammu in the Indian state of Jammu and Kashmir
- Raghunathganj I, a community development block that forms an administrative division in Jangipur subdivision of Murshidabad district in the Indian state of West Bengal
- Raghunathganj II, a community development block that forms an administrative division in Jangipur subdivision of Murshidabad district in the Indian state of West Bengal

== People ==
=== First name ===
- Raghunath (politician), Indian politician from Madhya Pradesh
- Raghunath Choudhary (1879–1967), Indian writer of the Jonaki era of Assamese literature
- Raghunath Mahato, Indian freedom fighter
- Raghunath Manet, Indian classical musician and dancer
- Raghunath Murmu, Creator of Ol Chiki script
- Raghunath Pandit, Indian Marathi poet who was active around the year 1800
- Raghunath Patnaik, Indian politician, veteran leader of the Indian National Congress
- Raghunath Prasanna (c.1920–1999), Indian classical shehnai and flute player
- Raghunathrao (1734-1783), Peshwa of the Maratha Empire
- Raghunath Seth (1931–2014), Indian musician of Hindustani classical music
- Raghunath Singh, Indian Revolutionary
- Raghunath Singh (politician), Indian politician and National Congress leader
- Raghunath Vaman Dighe (1896-1980), Indian Marathi writer
- Raghunath Vinayak Dhulekar (1891-1980), Indian activist, freedom fighter
- Raghunath Vithal Khedkar (1873-????), Indian surgeon
- Ray Cappo (born 1966), also known as Raghunath, American hardcore punk vocalist

=== Middle name ===
- Datta Raghunath Kavthekar (1901–1979), Indian Marathi novelist
- Narahar Raghunath Phatak (1893–1979), Indian biographer and literary critic
- Shripad Raghunath Joshi (1920–2002), Indian Marathi author
- Vijay Raghunath Pandharipande (1940-2006), Indian-American physicist

=== Last name ===
- Aishwarya Vidhya Raghunath, Indian Carnatic music vocalist
- K. Raghunath, Indian diplomat who served as the Foreign Secretary of India in the late 1990s
- P. M. K. Raghunath (1950–2016), Indian cricketer

== See also ==
- Raghunatha, an Indian male given name, variant of Raghunath
- Raghunathan (surname)
- Raghunathpur (disambiguation)
- Raghu (disambiguation)
- Nath (disambiguation)
