= Gurveer Singh Brar =

Indian politician

Member of the Rajasthan Legislative Assembly
- Incumbent
- Assumed office 3 December 2023
- Preceded by: Jagdish Chander
- Constituency: Sadulshahar

Personal details
- Born: 10 March 1984 (age 42) Hanumangarh, Rajasthan
- Party: Bharatiya Janata Party
- Spouse: Shivadeep Kaur (m. 2009)
- Parent: Baldev Singh (father)
- Education: Bachelor's
- Occupation: Politician
- Source

Gurveer Singh Brar is an Indian politician. He was elected to the 16th Rajasthan Legislative Assembly from Sadulshahar. He is a member of the Bharatiya Janata Party.

== Political career ==
Following the 2023 Rajasthan Legislative Assembly election, he was elected as an MLA from the Sadulshahar Assembly constituency. He defeated Independent candidate Om Bishnoi with 15460 votes.
