= Raghunathpur, Unnao =

Raghunathpur Raghunāthpur
- Village
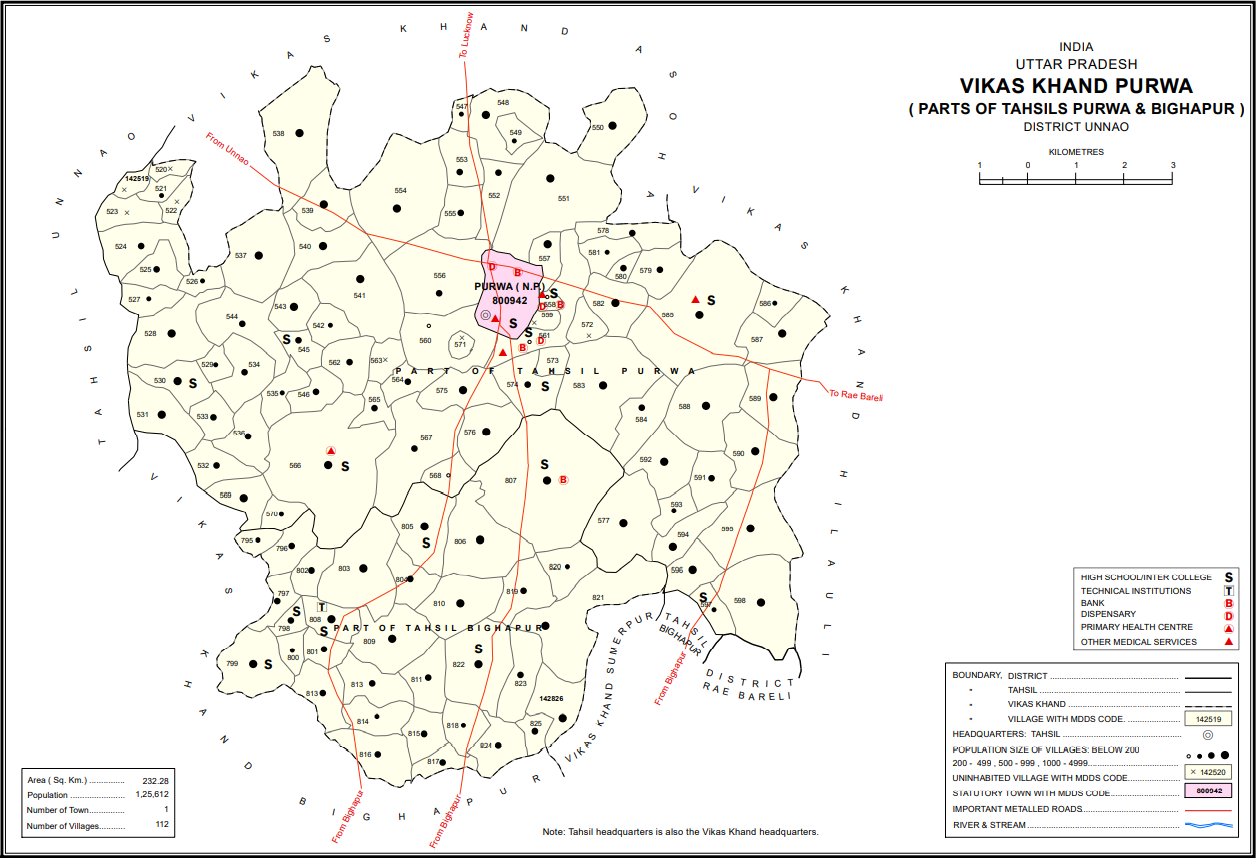
- Map showing Raghunathpur (#819) in Purwa CD block

- Location in Uttar Pradesh, India
- Coordinates: 26.383595°N 80.788325°E
- Country India: India
- State: Uttar Pradesh
- District: Unnao

Area
  - Total: 1.479 km^{2} (0.571 sq mi)

Population (2011)
  - Total: 756
  - Density: 511/km^{2} (1,320/sq mi)

Languages
  - Official: Hindi
- Time zone: UTC+5:30 (IST)
- Vehicle registration: UP-35

Raghunathpur is a village in Purwa block of Unnao district, Uttar Pradesh, India. As of 2011, its population is 756 people, in 142 households, and it has one primary school and no medical clinics.
