= Jagdish Chander =

Indian politician

Member of Rajasthan Legislative Assembly
- In office 2018–2023
- Preceded by: Gurjant Singh
- Constituency: Sadulshahar

Personal details
- Party: Indian National Congress

Jagdish Chander Jangid is an Indian politician currently serving as Secretary, All India Congress Committee (AICC). He is a former Member of Rajasthan Legislative Assembly from Sadulshahar. In 2023 assembly election Jangid lost to BJP's Gurveer Singh Brar.
