= Birbal Ram =

Indian politician

Member of Parliament, Lok Sabha
- In office 1980–1989
- Preceded by: Begaram Chauhan
- Succeeded by: Begaram Chauhan
- In office 1991-1996
- Preceded by: Begaram Chauhan
- Succeeded by: Nihalchand Meghwal
- Constituency: Ganganagar, Rajasthan

Personal details
- Born: 30 January 1936 (age 90)
- Party: Indian National Congress
- Spouse: Chawli Devi

Birbal Ram is an Indian politician. He was elected to the Lok Sabha, the lower house of the Parliament of India from Ganganagar, Rajasthan as a member of the Indian National Congress.
