= Ramgarh Gas Thermal Power Station =

- Country: India
- Location: Ramgarh, Jaisalmer, Rajasthan
- Coordinates: 27°20′12″N 70°31′59″E
- Status: Operational
- Commission date: 15 November 1994
- Owner: RVUNL
- Operator: Rajasthan Rajya Vidyut Utpadan Nigam

Thermal power station
- Primary fuel: Natural gas
- Turbine technology: Gas turbine Steam turbine

Power generation
- Units operational: 1 x 35.5 MW; 1 x 75 MW; 1 x 160 MW
- Nameplate capacity: 270.5 MW

Ramgarh Gas Thermal Power Station commonly abbreviated as RGTPP is a gas-based thermal power plant located at Ramgarh in Jaisalmer district, Rajasthan. This power station is Rajasthan's(RAJSTHAN'S FIRST GAS THERMAL POWER PLANT IS ANTA BARA NTPC GAS POWER PLANT WHICH COMMISSION IN JANUARY 1989 FIRST UNIT WHILE RAMGARGH PLANT'S FIRST UNIT COMMISSION ON JAN 1996), first gas based power station. The power plant is operated by the Rajasthan Rajya Vidyut Utpadan Nigam, a PSU company run by Govt. of Rajasthan. RGTPP is located 60 kilometres (37 mi) north-west from Jaisalmer district headquarters. Power station houses the GAIL terminal for the supply of gas fuel. ONGC, OIL and Focus Energy Ltd. are among the gas suppliers. It has a staff of more than 200 engineers and technical workers.

== Capacity ==
It has an installed capacity of 270.5 MW.

Stage	Unit Number	Installed Capacity (MW)	Turbine type	Date of Commissioning	Status
1	1	35.5	Gas Turbine	1996 January	Running
2	2	37.5	Gas Turbine	2002 August	Running
2	3	37.5	Steam Turbine	2003 April	Running
3	4	110	Gas Turbine	2013 March	Running
3	5	50	Steam Turbine	2014 April	Running

== Awards ==
Ramgarh Gas thermal power station was awarded The Best Generating power station of Rajasthan for the year 2014. The award was given on 26 January 2015 on the occasion of Republic Day in Jaipur.
