= Ganeshraj Bansal =

Indian politician

Member of 16th Rajasthan Legislative Assembly
- Incumbent
- Assumed office 2023
- Preceded by: Javed Khan King
- Constituency: Hanumangarh

Personal details
- Born: 1960
- Party: Independent politician
- Occupation: Politician

Ganeshraj Bansal is an Indian politician currently serving as a member of 16th Rajasthan Legislative Assembly, representing the Hanumangarh Assembly constituency as a member of the IND party.

Following the 2023 Rajasthan Legislative Assembly election, he was elected as an MLA from the Hanumangarh Assembly constituency and defeated opposition party BJP's candidate Amit Sahu with 9441 votes. Hanumangarh people
