= Rajendar Singh Bhadu =

Indian politician

Member of the Rajasthan Legislative Assembly
- In office 2013–2018
- Preceded by: Gangajal Meel
- Succeeded by: Rampratap Kasniyan
- Constituency: Suratgarh

Personal details
- Party: Bharatiya Janata Party
- Occupation: Politician

Rajendar Singh Bhadu is an Indian politician from the Bharatiya Janata Party and was a member of the Rajasthan Legislative Assembly representing the Suratgarh Vidhan Sabha constituency of Rajasthan.
