= Dungar Ram Gedar =

Indian politician

Member of the 16th Rajasthan Assembly
- Incumbent
- Assumed office 3 December 2023
- Preceded by: Ram Pratap Kashniya
- Constituency: Suratgarh

Personal details
- Born: Rajasthan
- Party: Indian National Congress
- Education: Bachelor of Arts
- Alma mater: Maharshi Dayanand Saraswati University
- Occupation: Politician

Dungar Ram Gedar is an Indian politician and a member of the 16th Rajasthan Assembly representing Suratgarh Assembly constituency. He is a member of the Indian National Congress.

== Education ==
Dungar Ram Gedar did his graduation with a Bachelor of Arts at Maharshi Dayanand Saraswati University in 1989.
