= Raghunathpur, Uttar Pradesh =

Raghunathpur
- village
- Location in Uttar Pradesh, India Raghunathpur (India)
- Coordinates: 28.696714°N 77.723817°E
- Country: India
- State: Uttar Pradesh
- District: Hapur

Government
  - Body: Gram panchayat

Area
  - Total: 3 km^{2} (1.2 sq mi)

Population
  - Total: 5,000
  - Density: 1,700/km^{2} (4,300/sq mi)

Languages
  - Official: Hindi
- Time zone: UTC+5:30 (IST)
- PIN: 245101
- Vehicle registration: UP 37
- Nearest city: Hapur, Pilkhuwa
- Vidhan Sabha constituency: Dhaulana
- Website: hapur.nic.in

Raghunathpur is a village in Uttar Pradesh, India. It is part of the Hapur District. Raghunathpur is located 9.0 km from its main city Hapur. Raghunathpur is 30.2 km from Ghaziabad (Previous District). The population mainly consists of Rajputs and Brahmans. Laxmangarhi is also the part of this village.

The nearest villages are Pootha Husainpur (1.3 km), Anwarpur (1.5 km), Girdharpur Tumrail (1.9 km), Nizampur (3.0 km), Nan(2.6 km).

== Nearest schools ==
1. Purv Madhyamik Vidyalaya Raghunathpur (0 km)
2. RAV International School, Raghunathpur (0 km)
3. H.S Public School, Kastla Kasmabad (4.0 km)
4. JPS Global Academy, Kastla Kasmabad (4.0 km)
5. Shri Jagpal Singh Smarak Higher Secondary School Nizampur (3.0 km)

Nearest bus stop

 Nizampur(3.0 km)

== Nearest railway station ==
1. Kastla Kasmabad Halt -KKMB (3.1 km)
2. Pilkhuwa - PKW (6.0 km)
3. Hapur Jn - HPU (10.0 km)

== Nearest hospitals ==
1. Government Primary Hospital Raghunathpur (0 km)
2. Saraswathi Institute Of Medical Sciences, Anwarpur (4.0 km)
3. G S Medical College & Hospital, Pilkhuwa (5.0 km)
