= Raghunathpura =

- Village
- Raghunathpura
- Location in Rajasthan, India Raghunathpura (India)
- Coordinates: 29°13′N 73°36′E
- Country: India
- State: Rajasthan
- District: Sriganganagar

Government
  - Type: Democratic
  - Body: Gram Panchayat
  - Sarpanch: Mr. Madan ji nath
- Elevation: 170 m (560 ft)

Languages
  - Official: Hindi
  - Regional: Bagri, Rajasthani
- Time zone: UTC+5:30 (IST)
- PIN: 335704
- Telephone code: 01509
- Vehicle registration: RJ-13
- Website: http://www.mhers.org/

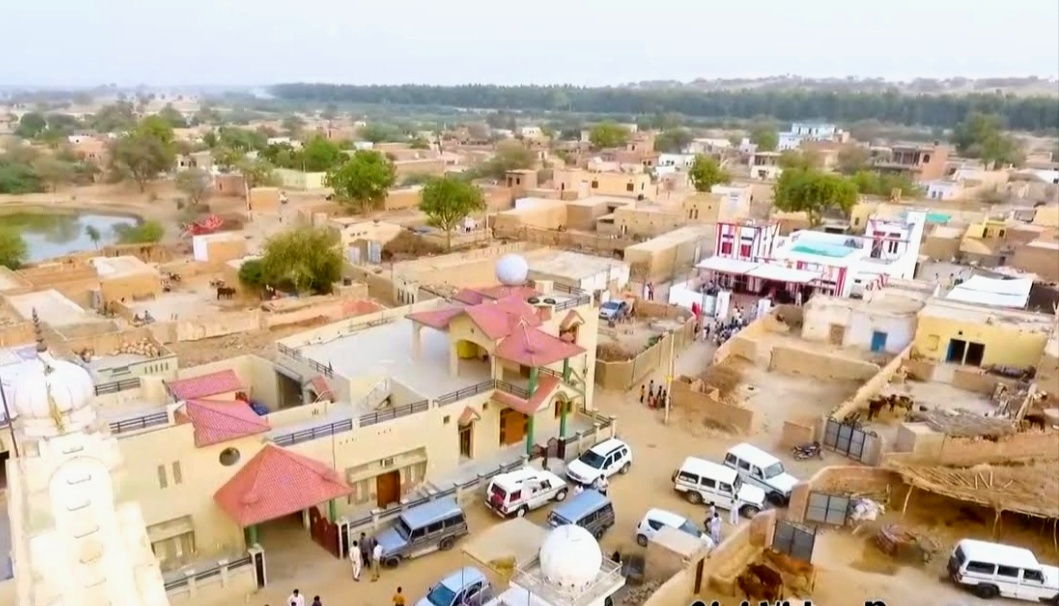

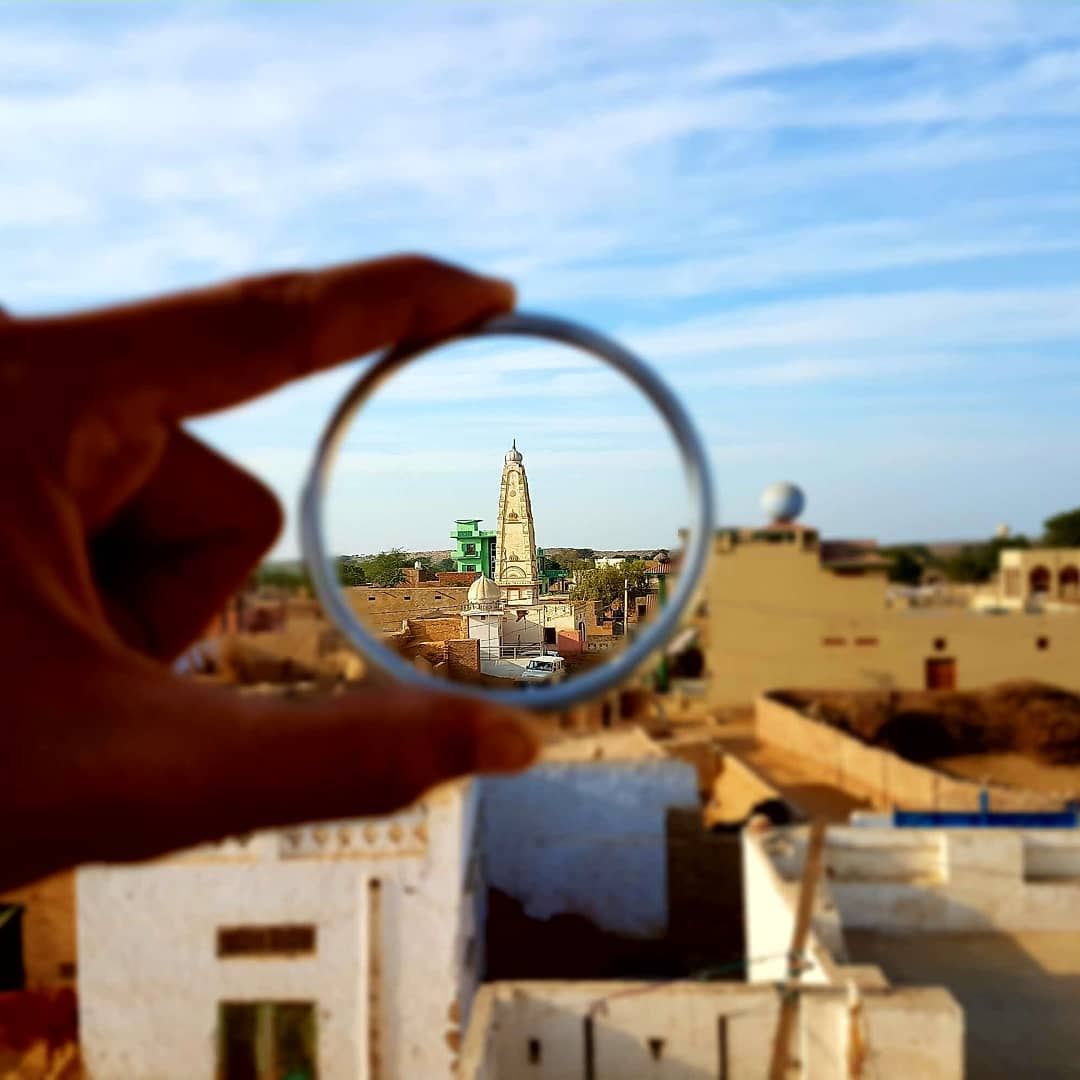
Raghunathpura, Rajasthan (2018)

Raghunathpura is a village in Sri Ganganagar district of Rajasthan.It is situated on the right bank of Anupgarh branch that is the branch of Indira gandhi Main Canal . This is largest irrigation system of Rajasthan. It is One of the major village in the district. It is divided into two suburbs, Raghunathpura (4rm) and Raghunathpura Aabadi (5rm) .

== History ==
Raghunathpura was called Ghurnaat (घूर्नाट) till a decade or two decade before independence, later it was renamed Raghunathpura after a Jagirdar named Raghunath Singh.

== Political Scenario ==
Although Raghunathpura village is very old, but earlier it was a part of Govindsar Panchayat and in the princely period, it was a part of Mahajan Jagir which was a part of Bikaner state. After a few years, Raghunathpura became a separate Panchayat and started participating in the general elections. Initially this village was under Suratgarh Panchayat Samiti but due to delimitation in the year 2026 this village came under the new Panchayat Samiti Rajiyasar. Due to this delimitation, a new Panchayat of 1AS village was formed from Raghunathpura Panchayat in which 2rm, 1AS and 7dwm villages from Raghunathpura Panchayat were transferred to this new Panchayat.

Chart
Year	Name	Political Post	Category
Not found	Shri Shivkaran sharma	Sarpanch /Up Pradhan	GEN
Not found	Shri Chanduram ji legha	Pradhan	OBC
1995	Shri Shanti devi	Jila Parishad member	OBC
1995	Shri Brij Lal verma	Sarpanch	OBC
2000	Shri Prithviraj dehdu	Sarpanch	OBC
2005	Shri Gauri Shankar Sharma	UP Pradhan	GEN
2005	Shri Baggaram meghwal	Jila Parishad Member	SC
2005	Shri Keshuram Meghwal	Sarpanch	SC
2010	Shri Shankar Giri	Sarpanch	OBC
2015	Shri Chimanlal Meghwal	Panchayat samiti Member	SC
2015	Shri Kaushlya Saharan	Sarpanch	OBC
2020	Shri Savitri Meghwal	Sarpanch	SC
2021	Shri Rahul legha	Panchayat samiti Member	OBC
2026	Shri Madan Ji Nath	Sarpanch	OBC

== Population ==
Village wise number of Rural Population as on (01/10/2026)

Chart
Sr. No	Village	SC	ST	GEN	Total
01	2 As	51	0	134	185
02	24 Sd	386	0	1111	1497
03	4 Rm (Raghunathpura)	754	0	1987	2741
04	5 Rm (Raghunathpura)	285	12	901	1198
05	Raghunathpura	49	0	31	80
Total		1525	12	4164	5701

== Language ==
Bagri is the major language. Punjabi is also used as a second language in the area and as the predominant language in northern areas along the border of Punjab. Hindi is the state language and English is also used among officials and youth.

== Culture ==
Raghunathpura village contains a wide cultural diversity. Most of the people from the village are farmers. The village has a traditional Rajasthani culture with some Punjabi influence.

== Profession ==
The major work of the village is farming; major crops include rice, bajra, cotton, wheat, and vegetables.

== Grid sub-station ==
The Raghunathpura gss started on 19 July 2018. Gss will supply electricity all the gram panchayat villages like 10RD, 1Rm, 40rd, 2gsm, 24sd, 22GB, sukhchainpura etc.

== Climate ==
The climate of Raghunathpura varies to extreme limits. The summer temperature reaches 50 °C and the winter temperature dips to around 0 °C. The average annual rainfall is only 176 mm (6.92 in). The average maximum temperature in summer is around 43.8 °C and the average minimum temperature in winter is around 13.4 °C.

== Transport ==
It is located some 41 km south- west of Suratgarh and around 103 km off to Sriganganagar. Kalyankot is the nearest railway station of Raghunathpura. It is 28 km off National Highway NH-62 and 399 km from the state capital, Jaipur. Raghunthpura is located on the link road of Sri vijaynagar to Rajiyasar.
