= Bhadokhar =

Bhadokhar Bhadokhār
- Village
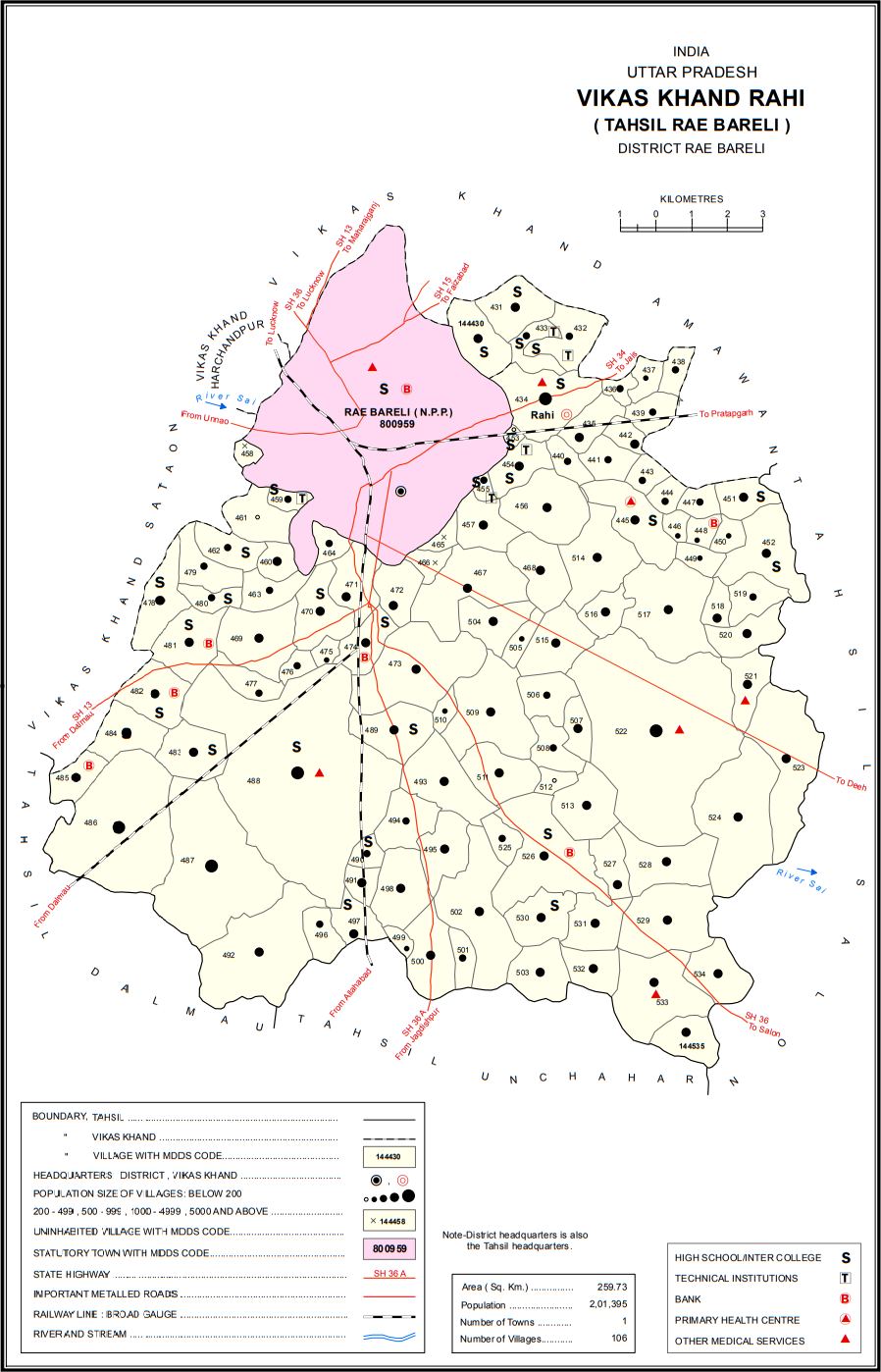
- Map showing Bhadokhar (#509) in Rahi CD block

- Location in Uttar Pradesh, India
- Coordinates: 26.157463°N 81.276886°E
- Country: India
- State: Uttar Pradesh
- District: Raebareli

Area
  - Total: 5.336 km^{2} (2.060 sq mi)

Population (2011)
  - Total: 3,312
  - Density: 620.7/km^{2} (1,608/sq mi)

Languages
  - Official: Hindi
- Time zone: UTC+5:30 (IST)
- Vehicle registration: UP-35

Bhadokhar is a village in Rahi block of Rae Bareli district, Uttar Pradesh, India. It is located 9 km from Rae Bareli, the district headquarters. As of 2011, it has a population of 3,312 people, in 649 households. It has 3 primary schools and no medical facilities. The village hosts a weekly haat but not a permanent market. It serves as the headquarters of a nyaya panchayat which also includes 9 other villages.

The 1951 census recorded Bhadokhar as comprising 9 hamlets, with a total population of 1,060 people (548 male and 512 female), in 231 households and 224 physical houses. The area of the village was given as 1,319 acres. 58 residents were literate, 55 male and 3 female. The village was listed as belonging to the pargana of Rae Bareli South and the thana of Kotwali. Bhadokhar had a primary school at that point with 123 students in attendance as of 1 January 1951.

The 1961 census recorded Bhadokhar as comprising 9 hamlets, with a total population of 1,232 people (640 male and 592 female), in 262 households and 252 physical houses. The area of the village was given as 1,319 acres and it had a medical practitioner at that point.

The 1981 census recorded Bhadokhar as having a population of 1,862 people, in 327 households, and having an area of 533.39 hectares. The main staple foods were listed as wheat and rice.

The 1991 census recorded Bhadokhar as having a total population of 2,372 people (1,248 male and 1,124 female), in 393 households and 386 physical houses. The area of the village was listed as 533 hectares. Members of the 0-6 age group numbered 500, or 21% of the total; this group was 52% male (258) and 48% female (242). Members of scheduled castes numbered 606, or 25.5% of the village's total population, while no members of scheduled tribes were recorded. The literacy rate of the village was 38% (676 men and 236 women). 658 people were classified as main workers (595 men and 62 women), while 59 people were classified as marginal workers (4 men and 55 women); the remaining 1,656 residents were non-workers. The breakdown of main workers by employment category was as follows: 318 cultivators (i.e. people who owned or leased their own land); 85 agricultural labourers (i.e. people who worked someone else's land in return for payment); 10 workers in livestock, forestry, fishing, hunting, plantations, orchards, etc.; 1 in mining and quarrying; 3 household industry workers; 47 workers employed in other manufacturing, processing, service, and repair roles; 7 construction workers; 60 employed in trade and commerce; 21 employed in transport, storage, and communications; and 105 in other services.
