= 1952 Ajmer State Legislative Assembly election =

1952 Ajmer Legislative Assembly election
- 27 March 1952

All 30 seats in the Ajmer Legislative Assembly 16 seats needed for a majority
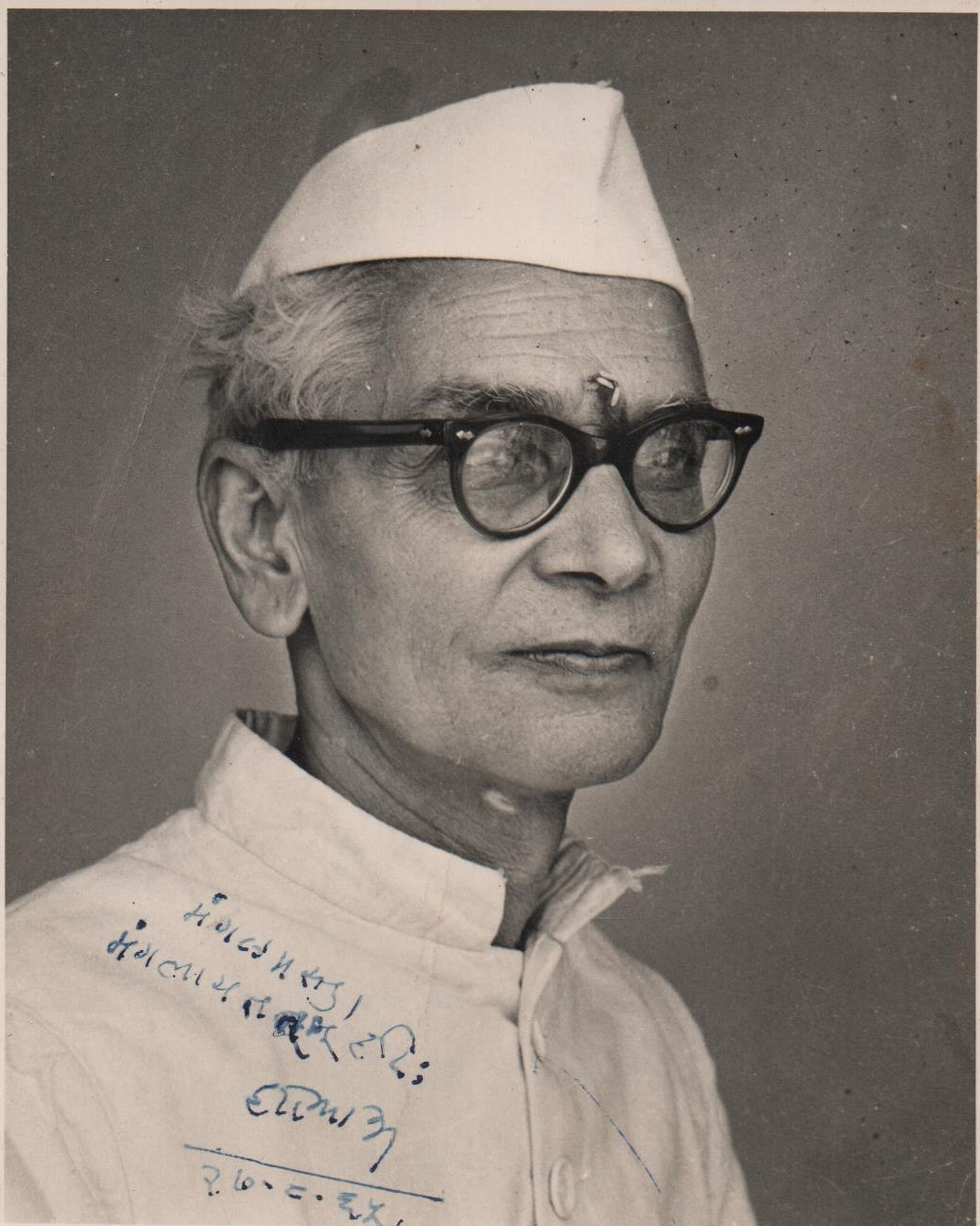

	Majority party	Minority party
Leader	Haribhau Upadhyaya
Party	Indian National Congress	Bharatiya Jana Sangh
Seats won	20	3
Elected Chief Minister of Ajmer
Haribhau Upadhyaya
INC

Ajmer State

Indian administrative divisions, as of 1951

Elections to the Ajmer Legislative Assembly were held on 27 March 1952. 134 candidates competed for the 30 seats in the Assembly. This was the final election for the Ajmer Legislative Assembly: on 1 November 1956, under the provisions of the States Reorganisation Act, 1956, the Ajmer State was abolished and its constituencies were merged into Rajasthan.

== Constituencies ==
The Ajmer Legislative Assembly consisted of 30 seats distributed in six two-member constituencies; Ajmer-I (South West), Ajmer-II (East), Jethana, Nasirabad, Kekri and Masuda and eighteen single-member constituencies. None of these seats were under reserved category for Scheduled Castes and Scheduled Tribes. Total 134 candidates contested for these 30 seats. Maximum number of candidates were 13 from Ajmer-I (South West) and Ajmer-II (East), while Bhinai had only 2 contestants, minimum of all the constituencies.

== Results ==
Summary of results of the 1952 Ajmer Legislative Assembly election
Party	Flag	Seats Contested	Won	% of Seats	Votes	Vote %
Indian National Congress		30	20	66.67	1,04,411	44.47
Bharatiya Jana Sangh		15	3	10.00	28,057	11.95
Pursharathi Panchayat		6	3	10.00	15,781	7.72
Communist Party of India		2	0		3,494	1.49
Socialist Party		2	0		1,055	0.45
Independent politician		79	4	13.33	81,990	34.92
Total Seats		30	Voters	4,62,810	Turnout	2,34,788 (50.73%)

== Elected members ==
#	Constituency	Member	Party
1	Ajmer-I (South West)	Parasram	Pursharathi Panchayat
1	Ajmer-I (South West)	Arjandas	Pursharathi Panchayat
2	Ajmer-II (East)	Bal Krishna Kaul	Indian National Congress
2	Ajmer-II (East)	Harjit Lal	Indian National Congress
3	Ajmer-III (Kala Bagh)	Ramesh Chandra	Indian National Congress
4	Ajmer-IV (Town Hall)	Bhiman Das	Pursharathi Panchayat
5	Ajmer - V (Naya Bazar)	Ambalal	Bharatiya Jana Sangh
6	Ajmer-VI (Dhaldin Ka Jhopra)	Syed Abbas Ali	Indian National Congress
7	Shrinagar	Hari Bhao Upadhaya	Indian National Congress
8	Derathu	Himmat Ali	Indian National Congress
9	Jethana	Narayan	Indian National Congress
9	Jethana	Bhagirath Singh	Indian National Congress
10	Pushker South	Jai Narain	Indian National Congress
11	Pushker North	Shiv Narayan Singh	Indian National Congress
12	Gagwana	Kishan Lal Lamror	Indian National Congress
13	Nasirabad	Laxminaryan	Indian National Congress
13	Nasirabad	Mahendra Singh	Independent
14	Bhinai	Kalyan Singh	Bharatiya Jana Sangh
15	Deolia Kalan	Chagan Lal	Indian National Congress
16	Sawar	Laxman Singh	Independent
17	Kekri	Jethmal	Indian National Congress
17	Kekri	Sewadas	Indian National Congress
18	Beawar City North	Brijmohanlal	Indian National Congress
19	Beawar City South	Jagan Nath	Indian National Congress
20	Shyamgarh	Wali Mohammad	Indian National Congress
21	Masuda	Narayan Singh	Independent
21	Masuda	Surajmal Morya	Indian National Congress
22	Nayanagar	Ganpati Singh	Bharatiya Jana Sangh
23	Jawaja	Chiman Singh	Independent
24	Todgarh	Prem Singh	Indian National Congress

== By-elections ==
In September 1953 a by-election was held for the Bhinai seat. In the original election, the Bhinai seat had been won by Kalyan Singh of the Bharatiya Jan Sangh, who defeated the Indian National Congress candidate Madan Singh with 3,164 votes (51.58%) against 2,970 (48.42%). However, the election in Bhinai was declared void as nomination papers had been improperly rejected and a by-election was called. Three candidates contested the by-election; Kalyan Singh of BJS, Chiman Singh of INC and independent candidate Misri Lal Chitlangia. Kalyan Singh retained the seat with 3,662 votes (65.3%). The Congress candidate got 1,635 votes (29.2%) and Chitalngia got 310 votes (5.5%).

== See also ==
- 1951–52 elections in India
- Ajmer State
- 1952 Rajasthan Legislative Assembly election
- 1957 Rajasthan Legislative Assembly election
