= Bal Krishna Kaul =

Indian politician (1903–1979)

Bal Krishna Kaul (18 June 1903 – 1979) was an Indian politician, an Indian National Congress worker, and an active participant of the struggle for Indian independence. He spent almost six years in jails during the struggle against British rule in India. After independence, he served as the Home and Finance Minister of Ajmer State 1952–1956 and later as Finance, Excise and Taxation Minister in the Rajasthan state government 1962–1967. He was a member of the Rajya Sabha (upper chamber of the Parliament of India) 1968–1974.

== Childhood ==
Kaul was born in Moradabad on 18 June 1903. Kaul was the son of Iqbal Krishna Kaul.

== Political work in UP, Punjab and Ajmer ==
Bal Krishna Kaul entered politics in 1920, becoming a disciple of Lala Lajpat Rai. He was politically active in Ferozpur, in the organization led by Mahatma Nandgopal. Jawaharlal Nehru, in his capacity as UPCC general secretary, requested Kaul move to the United Provinces. In December 1921 Kaul was arrested at Sikandrabad. He would spend more than a year in jail, being held in Bulandshahar, Aligarh, Agra and Lucknow. He went on hunger strike in jail for 22 days. After his release from jail, he was an active Indian National Congress worker in Allahabad and Meerut. Kaul studied up to Bachelor of Arts in Meerut.

Kaul moved to Ajmer in 1930. There he was employed at the Branch Manager of the Lakshmi Insurance Company Ltd. Kaul was imprisoned during the 1930–1931 civil disobedience movement. He was a member of the All India Congress Committee (1930–1941) and the Rajputana and Central India Provincial Congress Committee. He married Vishnumaya Kaul on 24 January 1935, the couple would go on to have two sons and two daughters.

== Satyagraha, Quit India movement and years in jail ==
In 1940, he undertook individual satyagraha, the first Congress leader in Ajmer to do so. He was arrested. He was again arrested during the Quit India movement of 1942, and held at Ajmer Jail for nearly 3 years (bringing his total time in jails to around six years). Kaul was sentenced to three months of hard labour for non-compliance with the rule for getting finger prints of political prisoners. In protest, he undertook a hunger strike. The Chief Commissioner, Ajmer refused Kaul's wife permission to see her husband during the hunger strike. After 22 days Kaul abandoned the hunger strike at the advice of Mahatma Gandhi, after which the authorities allowed his wife and family members to see him.

In 1945, Kaul was elected as a member of the Ajmer Municipal Board. He was nominated to serve on the Advisory Committee of the Chief Commissioner of Ajmer 1946–1947. Kaul was a member of the Ajmer Provincial Congress Committee. In 1950, he became a member of the Bombay, Baroda and Central India Railway Local Advisory Committee.

== Ajmer State minister ==
He was elected to the Ajmer Legislative Assembly from the Ajmer-II (East) constituency in the 1952 Ajmer Legislative Assembly election. He obtained 5,251 votes, standing as one of the Indian National Congress candidates for the two-member seat. Kaul served as the Home and Finance Minister of Ajmer State, until the merger of Ajmer State with Rajasthan. He also held the ministerial portfolios of Planning and Development, Public Works, Excise and Registration and Stamps in the Ajmer State government.

== In Rajasthan politics ==
Kaul contested the Ajmer City East seat in the 1957 Rajasthan Legislative Assembly election. He was defeated by independent candidate Mahendra Singh, finishing in second place with 8,211 votes (31.89%). In 1957–1958 he led protests for Ajmer employees (arguing that former Ajmer State employees were discriminated against in the integration in to the Rajasthan state bureaucracy), and on 1 October 1958 he initiated conducted a 15-day hunger strike. Kaul was elected to the Rajasthan Legislative Assembly in the 1962 election, obtaining 22,961 votes (68.14%) in Ajmer City East. Subsequently he was named Finance, Excise and Taxation Minister in the Rajasthan state government. Kaul contested the Nasirabad seat in the 1967 Rajasthan Legislative Assembly election, finishing in second place with 11,774 votes (35.21%).

== Rajya Sabha parliamentarian ==
In September 1968, he was elected to the Rajya Sabha. Kaul's Rajya Sabha term lasted from 4 October 1968 to 2 April 1974. Kaul sided with the Congress (O) in the split in the party. In 1971, he became a member of the Public Accounts Committee of Parliament.

Bal Krishna Kaul died in 1979.
