= 1953 Bhinai by-election =

| ← 1952 | September 1953 | 1957 → |

Bhinai constituency
| | ABJ | INC |
| Candidate | Kalyan Singh | Chiman Singh |
| Party | ABJS | INC |
| Popular vote | 3,662 | 1,635 |
| Percentage | 65.31% | 29.16% |

In September 1953 a by-election was held in for the Bhinai seat of the Legislative Assembly of the Indian state of Ajmer. The election was won by BJS candidate Kalyan Singh by a huge margin.

In the 1952 Legislative Assembly election the Bhinai seat had been won by Kalyan Singh of the Bharatiya Jan Sangh, who defeated the Indian National Congress candidate Madan Singh with 3,164 votes (51.58%) against 2,970 (48.42%). However, the election in Bhinai was declared void as nomination papers had been improperly rejected and a by-election was called.

The by-election was held in September 1953. Three candidates contested it; Kalyan Singh of BJS, Chiman Singh of INC and independent candidate Misri Lal Chitlangia. Kalyan Singh retained the seat with 3,662 votes (65.3%). The Congress candidate got 1,635 votes (29.2%) and Chitalngia got 310 votes (5.5%).
