= Shambhu Dayal Badgujar =

Indian politician

- Constituency: Kekri Constituency

Personal details
- Born: uncertain Ajmer, Rajasthan, India
- Died: 2017 Kekri
- Party: Bharatiya Janata Party (BJP)
- Spouse: Smt Krishna Badgujar
- Children: 3
- Profession: Politician

Shambhu Dayal Badgujar was an Indian politician belonged to Bharatiya Janata Party. He was two times member of legislative assembly represented Kekri (Ajmer) constituency. He was chairman of Rajasthan Khadi & Village Industries Board. He died in 2017.
