= Arjandas Tulsidas Gajwani =

Sindhi politician and advocate (born 1915)

- ارجنداس تلسيداس گجواڻي
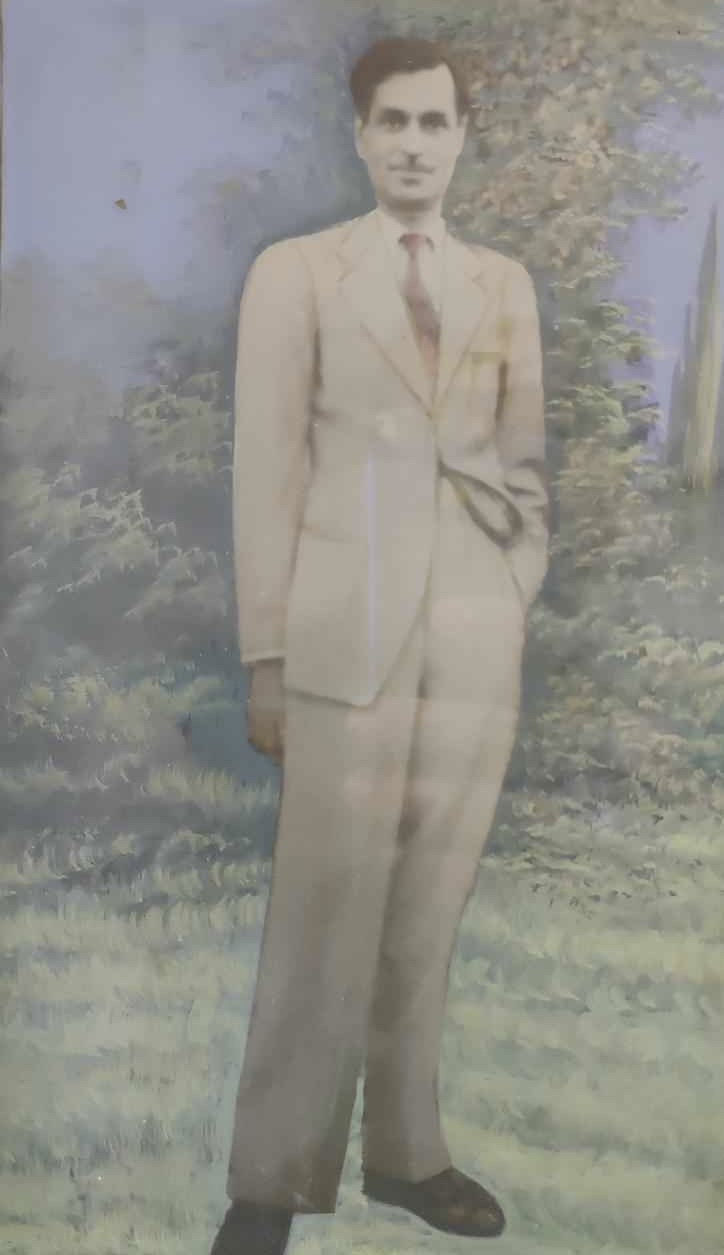

Member of Ajmer Legislative Assembly
- In office 5 May 1952 – 1 November 1956
- Constituency: Ajmer-I (South West)

Member of Rajasthan Legislative Assembly
- In office 1 April 1957 – 6 March 1962
- Constituency: Ajmer City (West)

Personal details
- Born: 3 January 1915 (age 111) Rohri, Sindh
- Profession: Lawyer, Politician

Arjandas Tulsidas Gajwani (Sindhi: ارجنداس تلسيداس گجواڻي) was a Sindhi politician.

== Life ==
Gajwani was born on 3 January 1915. He became an advocate in 1936. Arjandas was a member of the municipal council of Rohri from 1942 to 1944 and served as the president of the municipality. He published the Sindhi language newspaper Hindu, founded in Ajmer in 1948.

== Political career ==
Gajwani was a member of the Working Committee of the political party Pursharathi Panchayat. Arjandas was elected to the Ajmer Legislative Assembly in the 1952 election. He stood as a candidate of Pursharathi Panchayat in the two-member constituency Ajmer-I (South West). He obtained 5,549 votes (21.66%). He was elected to the Rajasthan Legislative Assembly in the 1957, standing as an independent candidate in the Ajmer City West constituency. He obtained 14,400 votes (52.42%).
