= Gordha =

- village
- Location in Rajasthan, India Gordha (India)
- Coordinates: 25.7189759°N 75.1220119°E
- Country: India
- State: Rajasthan

Languages
  - Official: Hindi
- Time zone: UTC+5:30 (IST)
- ISO 3166 code: RJ-IN

Gordha is a village in Kekri Tehsil of Ajmer district, Rajasthan, India.

Gordha is situated in the last end of Ajmer district, which makes a border from Bhilwara. In the sight of Siachen, the No. 2 dam of Ajmer district is located in Gordha. The foundation of this dam was laid by the then Chief Minister of Rajasthan, Shri Mohan Lal Sukkadia. There is a fame for Nadio (small dam) in Gordha.

== Postal Code ==
There is a post office in the village and the postal code is 305407.
