= Kekri =

Kekri may refer to:

- Kekri (festival), a Finnish festival
- Kekri, Rajasthan, a city in the state of Rajasthan, India
- Kekri Assembly constituency, the state assembly constituency centred around the city

== See also ==
- Kekrinal
