= Thakur Ganpat Singh =

Indian politician

- ठाकुर गणपत सिंह

Member of the Ajmer Legislative Assembly
- In office 1951–1957
- Constituency: Nayanagar (1951)

Personal details
- Born: 17 August 1895 Kharwa village
- Party: Bharatiya Jan Sangh
- Spouse: Rani Lakshmi Kanwar Jodhiji
- Relatives: Descendant of Rao Jodha
- Education: Mayo College, Ajmer
- Occupation: Politician, Landowner
- Known for: Opposition to Ajmer land reforms

Military service
- Rank: Captain (during World War II)

Thakur Ganpat Singh (17 August 1895 – ?) was an Indian politician.

== Biography ==
Thakur Ganpat Singh was born in Kharwa village. A descendant of Rao Jodha, he was the son of the Istimrardar of Khawra Thakur Gopal Singh. Ganpat Singh studied at Mayo College in Ajmer. He succeeded his father as Istimrardar, taking over the family estate in May 1931. As of the 1930s the estate consisted of fifteen villages. During the Second World War, he held the rank of Captain and served in the Western Command.

Ganpat Singh was elected to the Ajmer Legislative Assembly in the 1951 election. He stood as the Bharatiya Jan Sangh candidate in the Nayanagar constituency. He obtained 1,958 votes (36.82%), defeating the Indian National Congress candidate Bheron by a margin of 111 votes. However, Bheron petitioned the Election Tribunal, calling into question the result. The election was declared void by the Election Tribunal in 1953 and a by-election was called. Ganpat Singh won the by-election, obtaining 3,516 votes against 1,453 votes for Bheron and 391 votes for the independent candidate Birdha. In the Ajmer Legislative Assembly, Ganpat Singh was part of the Assembly Progressive Party. Together with other landowners, Ganpat Singh opposed the Ajmer Abolition of Intermediaries and Land Reforms Act of 1955.

Ganpat Singh contested the Beawar seat in the 1957 Rajasthan Legislative Assembly election, again as a BJS candidate. He finished in third place with 3,836 votes (15.01%).

Ganpat Singh's daughter Rani Lakshmi Kanwar Jodhiji married Ram Raja Singh, the last ruler of Khandela Bara Pana.
