= Ajmer - V (Naya Bazar) Assembly constituency =

Coordinates: 26.461°N 74.631°E

Ajmer - V (Naya Bazar)
- Former constituency for the Rajasthan Legislative Assembly

Constituency details
- Country: India
- Region: North India
- State: Rajasthan
- Established: 1951
- Abolished: 1956

Ajmer - V (Naya Bazar) was a single-member constituency of the Legislative Assembly of the Ajmer State, India. The constituency covered four wards of the Ajmer municipality; No. 1, 3, 7 and 9. The constituency had 11,467 voters at the time of the 1951 assembly election. Ambalal of the Bharatiya Jana Sangh was its only representative, from 1951 to 1956.

In 1956, when India's state boundaries were reorganised, it became a district of the Rajasthan state. Ajmer state was merged into Rajasthan state on 1 November 1956.

== Election results ==
1951 Ajmer Legislative Assembly election: Ajmer - V (Naya Bazar)
Party	Candidate	Votes	%	±%
ABJS	Ambalal	3,519	49.82	
INC	Pratapchand	2,139	30.28	
Independent	Sobhraj	1,206	17.07	
Pursharathi Panchayat	Harumal	199	2.82	
Majority		1,308		
Turnout		7,063	61.59%	
ABJS hold		Swing		
