= Devidutt Pant =

Indian freedom fighter (1907–1982)

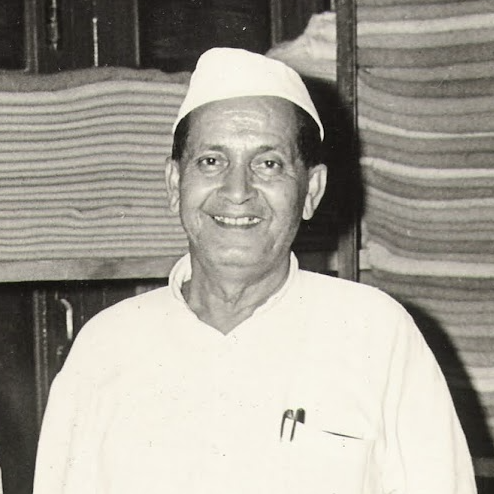

Personal details
- Born: 11 April 1907 Khantoli, Uttarakhand, India
- Died: 14 April 1982 (aged 75) Bikaner, India
- Citizenship: India
- Spouse: Lilawati Pant
- Parent: Taradutt Pant
- Awards: Tamra Patra Award

Devidutt Pant (11 April 1907 – 14 April 1982) was an Indian freedom fighter and founder of Bikaner Khadi Bhandar in Bikaner city of Rajasthan state in India . He was born in Khantoli (District Bageshwar, Uttarakhand) in the middle Himalayan range of Kumaun district located at 5000’ altitude. He moved to Rajasthan around 1927 from Kumaon.

From 1927 to 1935, Devidutt lived in various villages around Jaipur State. He was working for Akhil Bhartiya Charkha Sangh that had its headquarter in a village Govindgarh-Malikpur near Jaipur. All Khadi workers were expected to join national freedom movement against British government and go to jail whenever Mahatma Gandhi gave call. He was sentenced with hard labor of Six months during Non Cooperation Movement post Dandi March on 13 February 1932. He served this jail term in Ajmer. All prisoners were expected to carry out heavy manual labor like Grinding Wheat (Chakki Peesna), Oil Pressing, Making Jute ropes and other hard labor work. Haribhau Upadhyaya and Hira Lal Shashtri were also in the Jail with him who later reached at higher positions in the politics of Rajputana. All the prisoners were released under Gandhi-Irvine pact.

Devidutt Pant was one of the freedom fighter who was associated with the Khadi movement in India along with many other Indians. He promoted Khadi, a handspun and handwoven cloth made using Charkha, which became a symbol of India's struggle for independence from British rule.

Devidutt Pant established the "Khadi Bhandar" in Bikaner, Rajasthan, contributing to the promotion and sale of Khadi cloth. The Khadi Bhandar was not only a commercial venture but also a part of the larger Gandhian philosophy of self-reliance and economic independence. The Khadi movement, started by Mahatma Gandhi, aimed to revitalize the rural economy by promoting Khadi making as cottage industries.

Devidutt Pant's efforts in establishing and managing the Khadi Bhandar helped in creating employment opportunities in rural areas of Rajasthan. Khadi movement people to use local raw materials, like Kapaas and traditional craftsmanship. Until his death he actively promoted the Khadi. He was a recipient of Tamra Patra Award from former prime minister Indira Gandhi in recognition of her contribution in the freedom struggle on15 August 1972.

A statue of Pt. Devidutt Pant was unveiled on Thursday, 24 November 2022, at Khadi Gramodyog Pratisthan, opposite Dr. Karni Singh Stadium.

== Gallery ==
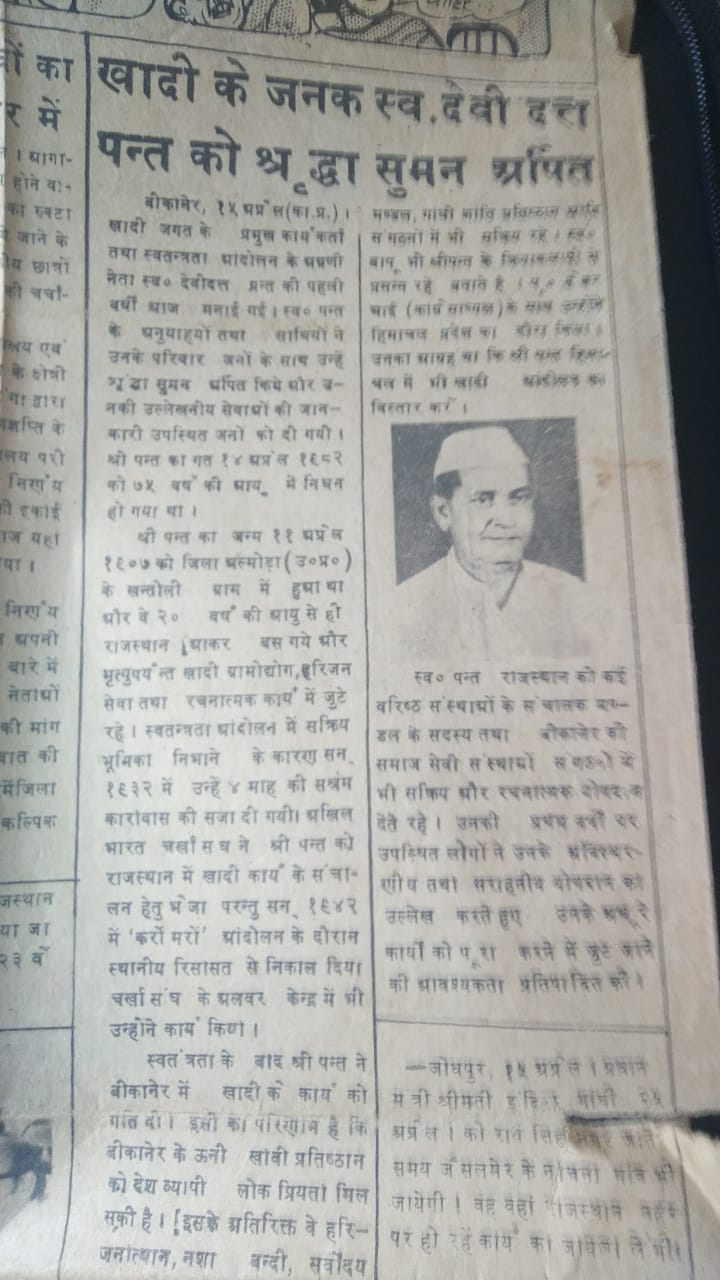
A newspaper cutting published on 15 Apr 1983 on his first death Anniversary

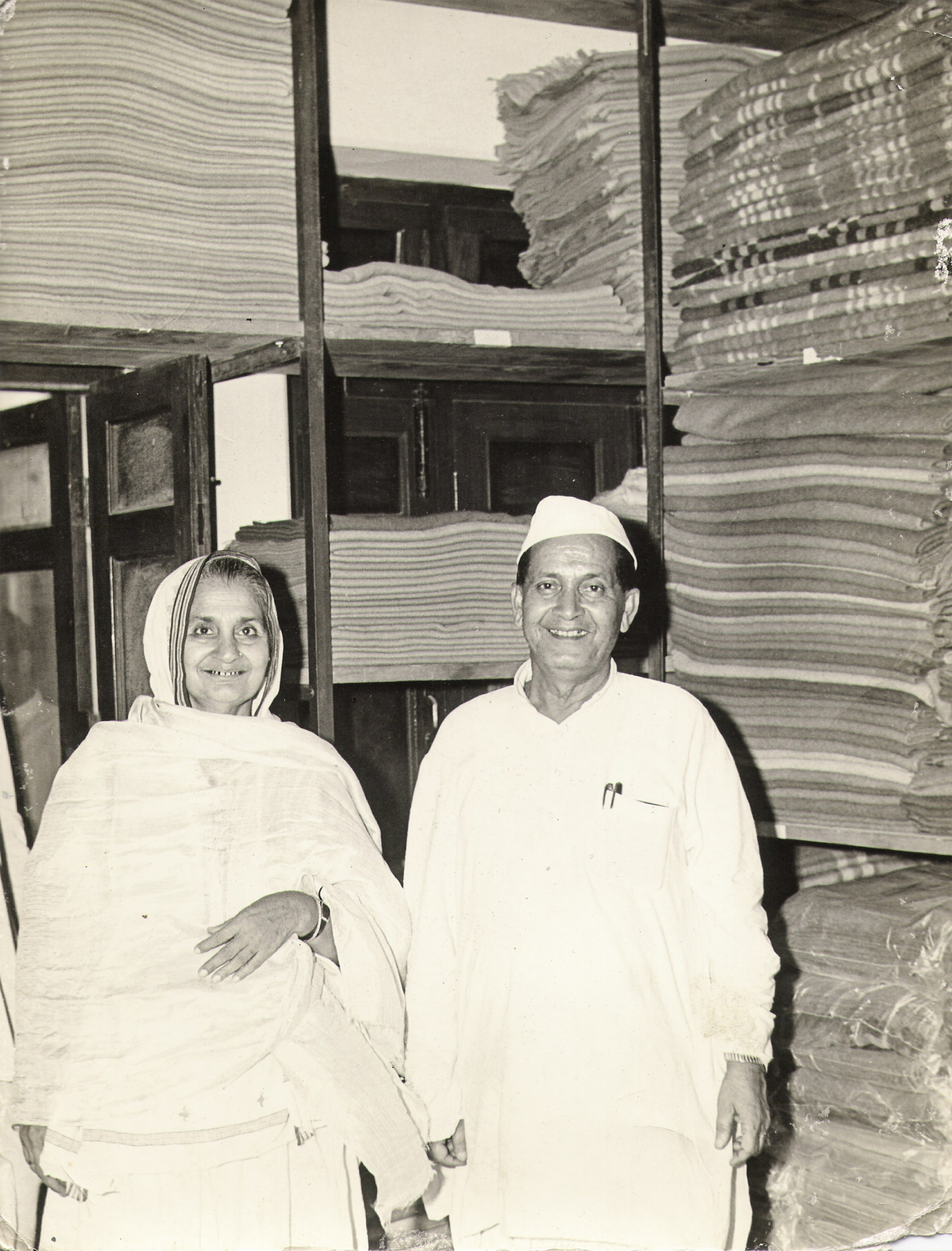
Picture with Lalita Shastri (wife of the second prime minister Lal Bahadur Shastri of India)

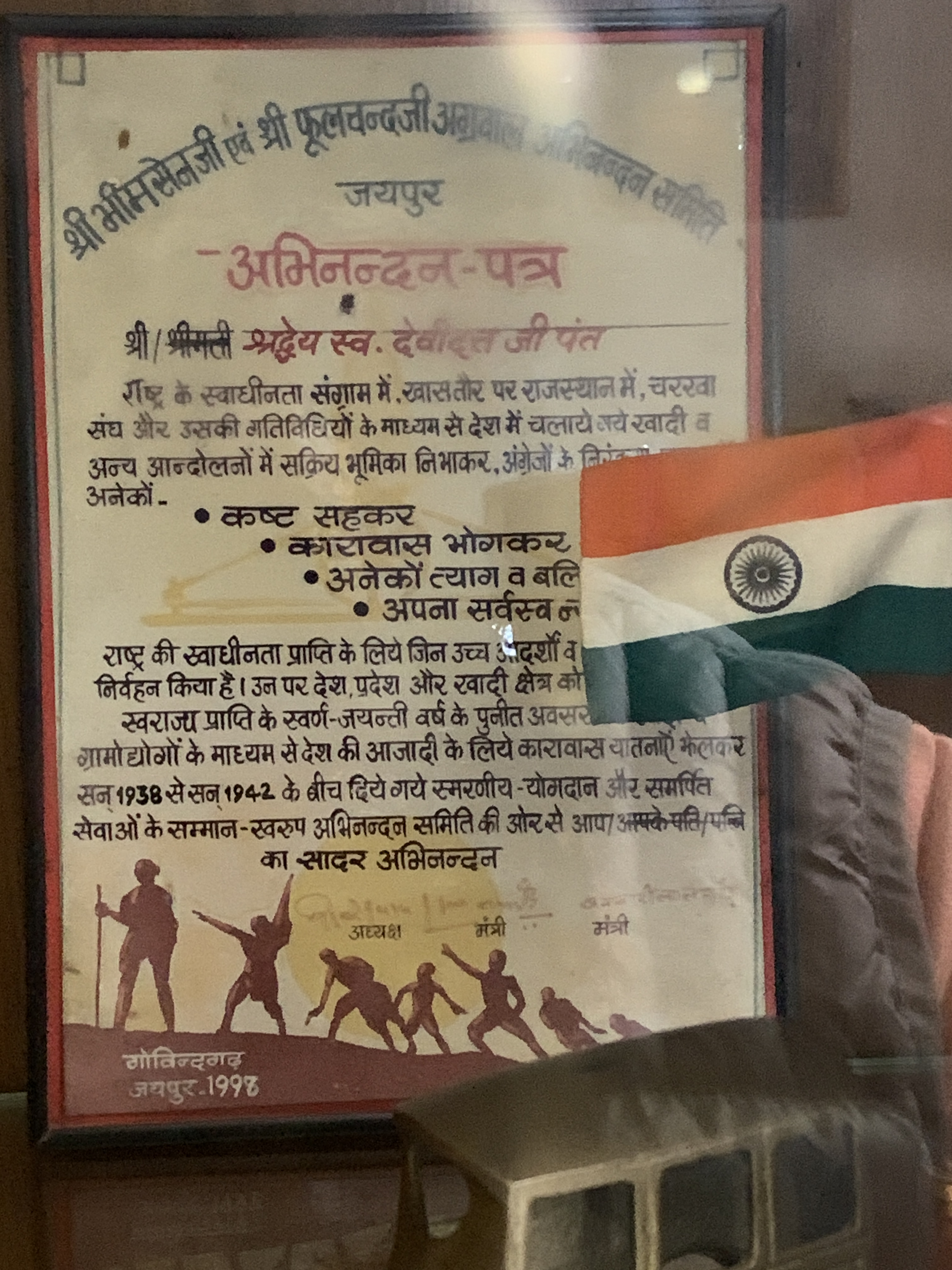
Abhinandan Patra given posthumously

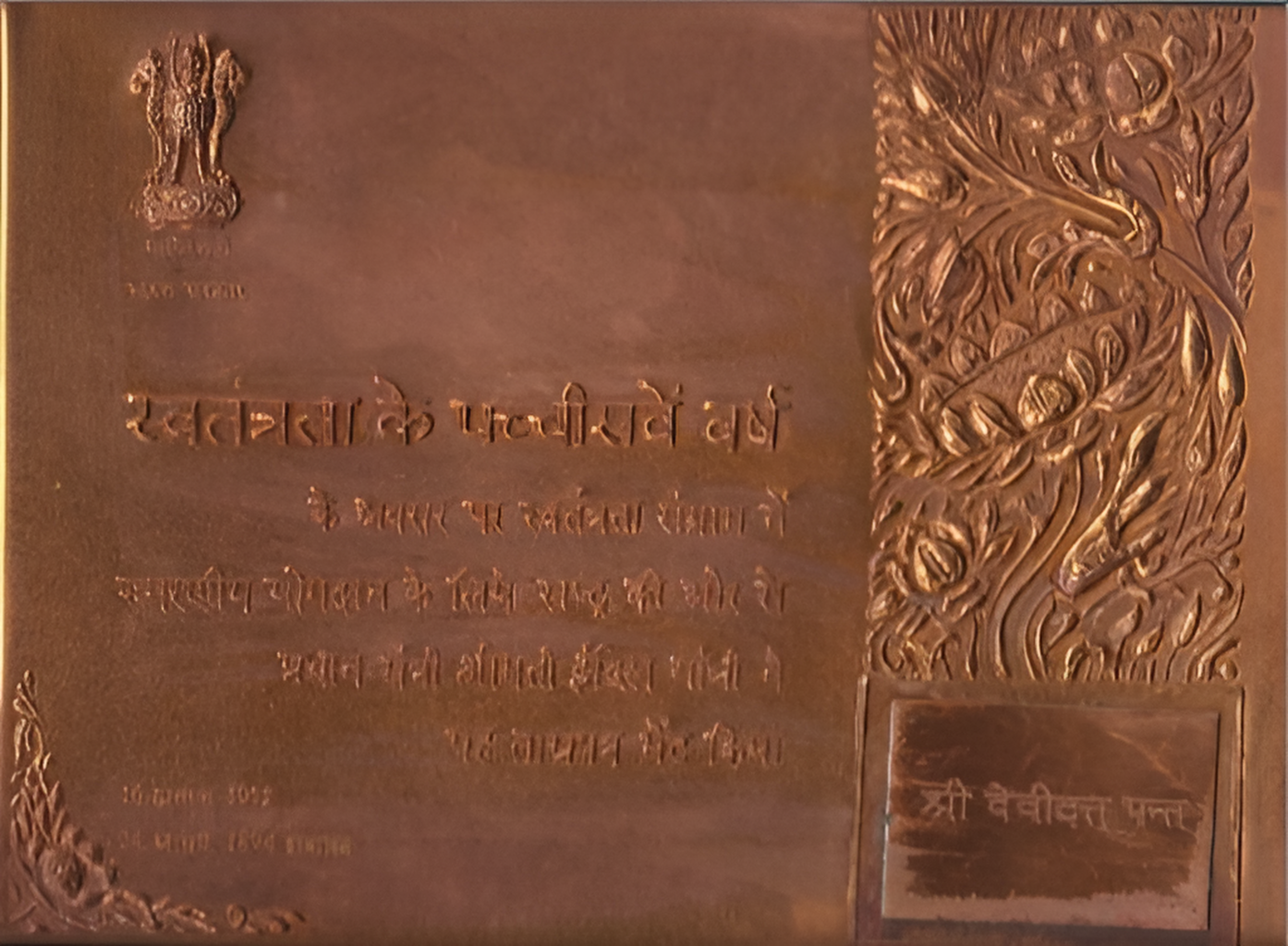
Tamrapatra by Government of India

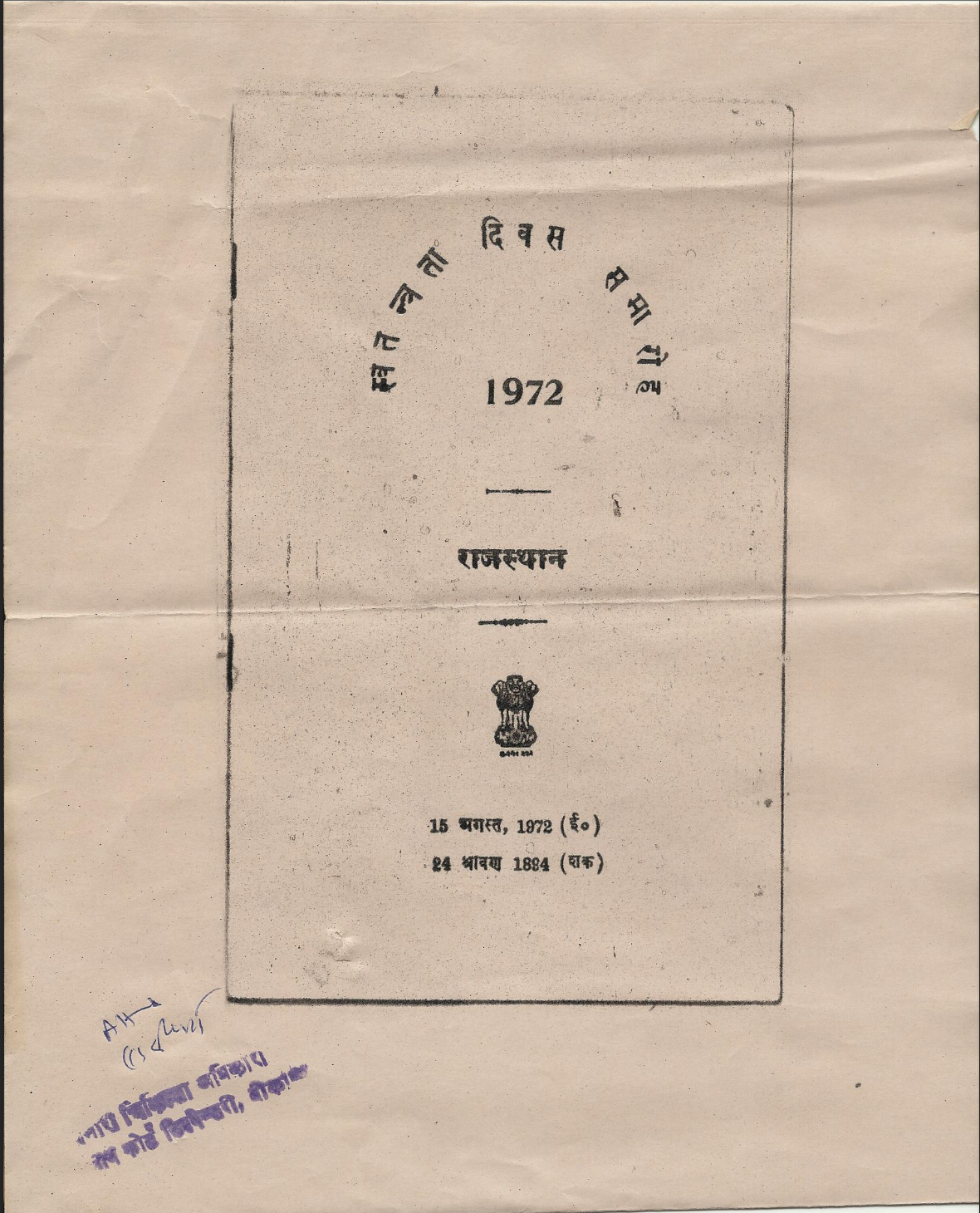
Front Page of the Tamrapatra recipients from Government of Rajasthan

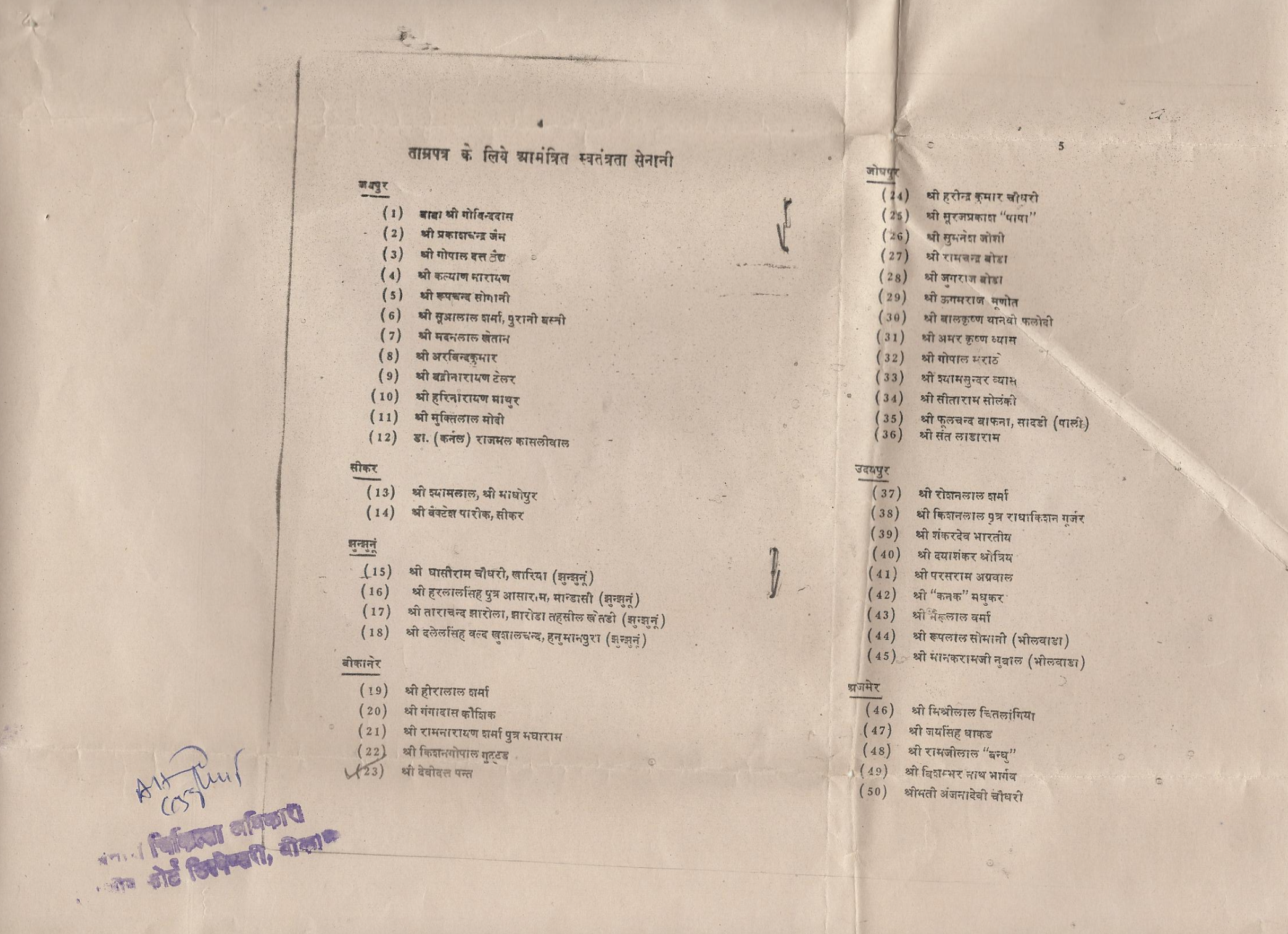
List of Tamrapatra recipients from Government of Rajasthan
