= Brij Mohan Lal Sharma =

20th century Indian politician and lawyer

Brij Mohan Lal Sharma (born 1903, Beawar) was an Indian politician. He became a lawyer in 1938. He was arrested in connection with the 1940 Satyagrah. Sharma won the Beawar City North seat in the 1951 Ajmer Legislative Assembly election as an Indian National Congress candidate. He obtained 2,372 votes (38.92%). After the election, he served as Minister of Education, Revenue and Local Self-Government in the Ajmer State cabinet.

After the merger of the Ajmer State with Rajasthan, Sharma was elected from the Beawar constituency of the Rajasthan Legislative Assembly in 1957. He obtained 10,750 votes (42.05%). During the 1960s, the Beawar Congress was torn by strife between Sharma and Chiman Singh Lodha (nick-named 'B' and 'C', respectively). The internal problems of the Congress Party led to an electoral defeat in the 1962 election. Sharma, who contested as the official Congress candidate, finished second with 9,575 votes (30.48%). He lost the seat to the communist candidate Swami Kumaranand. Sharma finished second in the 1967 election as well, with 14,187 votes (34.15%).
