= Shatrughan Gautam =

Indian politician

Member of the Rajasthan Legislative Assembly
- Incumbent
- Assumed office 3 December 2023
- Preceded by: Raghu Sharma
- Constituency: Kekri

Member of the Rajasthan Legislative Assembly
- In office December 2013 – December 2018
- Chief Minister: Vasundhara Raje
- Preceded by: Raghu Sharma
- Succeeded by: Raghu Sharma

Personal details
- Party: Bharatiya Janata Party
- Occupation: Politician

Shatrughan Gautam is an Indian politician from the Bharatiya Janata Party. He is a member of the Rajasthan Legislative Assembly, representing the Kekri constituency in Ajmer district, Rajasthan. He previously served as an MLA from 2013 to 2018 and was re-elected in the 2023 assembly elections.

== Political career ==
Shatrughan Gautam began his political journey at the grassroots level, serving as the sarpanch of Devgaon village.

Shatrughan Gautam is a member of the Bharatiya Janata Party (BJP) and has been elected twice to the Rajasthan Legislative Assembly from the Kekri constituency in Ajmer district, Rajasthan.

He was first elected as an MLA in the 2013 Rajasthan Legislative Assembly elections, defeating the incumbent Raghu Sharma of the Indian National Congress (INC). During his tenure from 2013 to 2018, he served under the leadership of Chief Minister Vasundhara Raje.

In the 2018 elections, he lost the seat to Raghu Sharma but regained it in the 2023 assembly elections, once again defeating Sharma. Gautam's political career reflects a continued rivalry with Raghu Sharma, with both having alternated as MLA from Kekri over the past decade.

== Electoral record ==
Election results
| Year | Office | Constituency | Candidate | Votes | % | Opponent | Opponent Votes | Opponent % | Result | Ref |
|---|---|---|---|---|---|---|---|---|---|---|
| 2023 | MLA | Kekri (Ajmer) | Shatrughan Gautam | 99,671 | 49.75% | Raghu Sharma | 92,129 | 45.98% | Won | TOI |
| 2013 | MLA | Kekri (Ajmer) | Shatrughan Gautam | 71,292 | 44.64% | Raghu Sharma | 62,425 | 39.09% | Won | TOI |
