= Khantoli =

Village in Uttarakhand, India

- Village
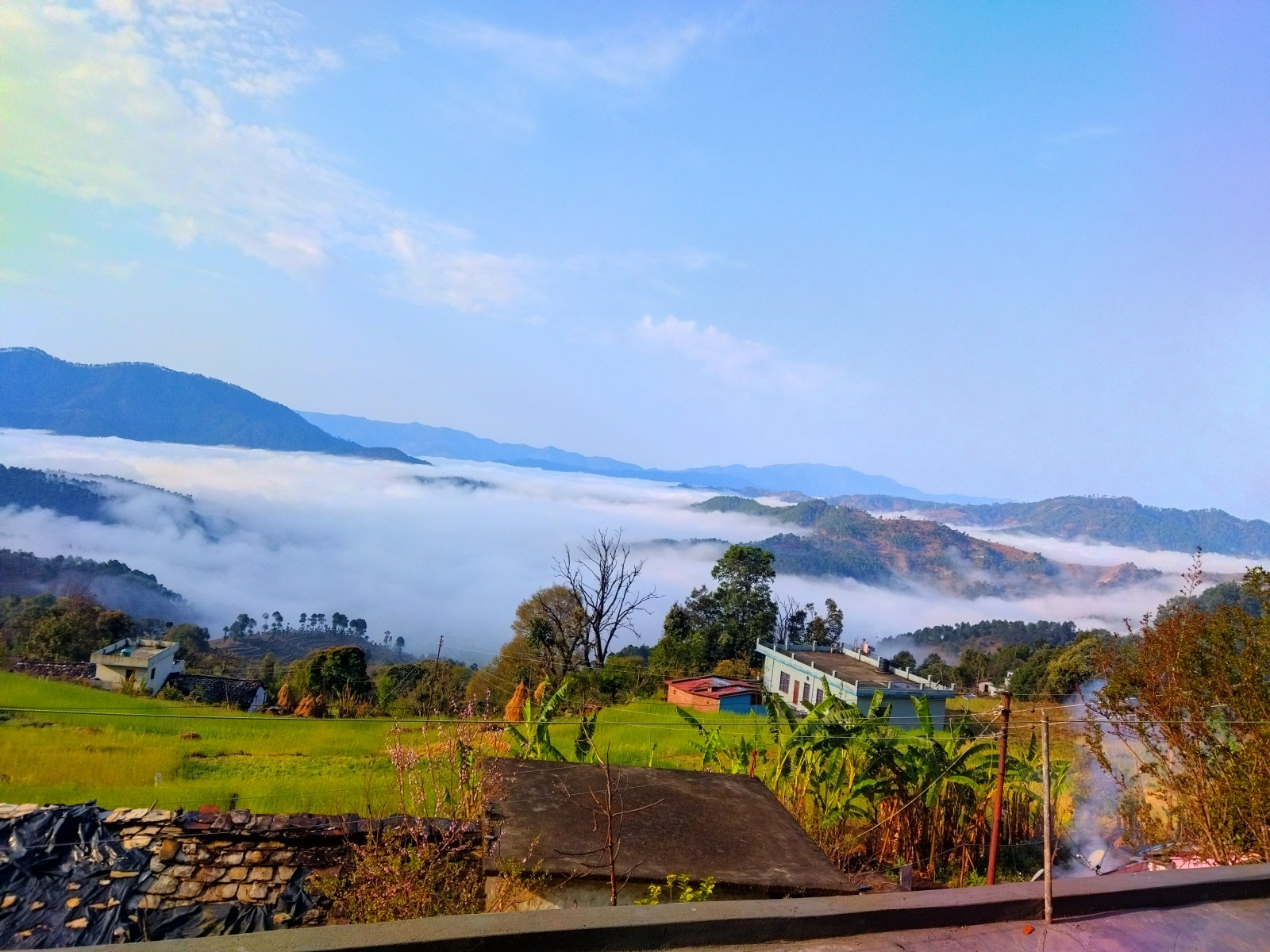

- Location in Uttarakhand, India Khantoli (India) Khantoli (Asia)
- Coordinates: 29.829956°N 79.9256112°E
- Country: India
- State: Uttarakhand
- Division: Kumaon
- District: Bageshwar

Government
  - Type: Gram Panchayat

Area
  - Total: 154.37 ha (381.5 acres)

Population
  - Total: 426
  - Density: 276/km^{2} (715/sq mi)

Languages
  - Official: Hindi; Sanskrit
- Time zone: UTC+5:30 (IST)
- PIN: 263642
- Vehicle registration: UK-02
- Website: uk.gov.in

Khantoli is a small village located at an elevation of 5000 ft in Bageshwar district of Uttrakhand. The village is located in Himalayan range of Uttrakhand. The total geographical area is 154.37 hectares and the total population is 426. There are about 102 houses (more in ruin than occupied). The sub-district headquarters Kanda is 8 km. away by the road and the district headquarters, Bageshwar, is 34 km away.

== Description ==
Khantoli is essentially a village of Brahmins with the surname Pant.

A local deity Dhoulinag (white Snake) on Khantoli hill top overseas around 50 villages, of the Valley. All religious functions are managed by two priests one of Pant Community and other of Rajput Dhami community. Both held the post as hereditary functions assigned to particular family.

Dhoulinag Temple is more than 150 year old. Old small temple is now replaced with a temple complex that has adjacent flat ground for village fairs and possible helipad area in future.

The village has two distinct groups of houses called Pargaon and Naghar, and a high school. Panchayat Ghar and Community Health centre are located in Naghar. Oldest Primary school is located almost in the middle of the village at the place called Kartekhalli, a big natural stone slab.

== Notable people ==
- Devidutt Pant (1907–1982), Indian freedom fighter
