= Raghu Sharma (politician) =

Indian politician

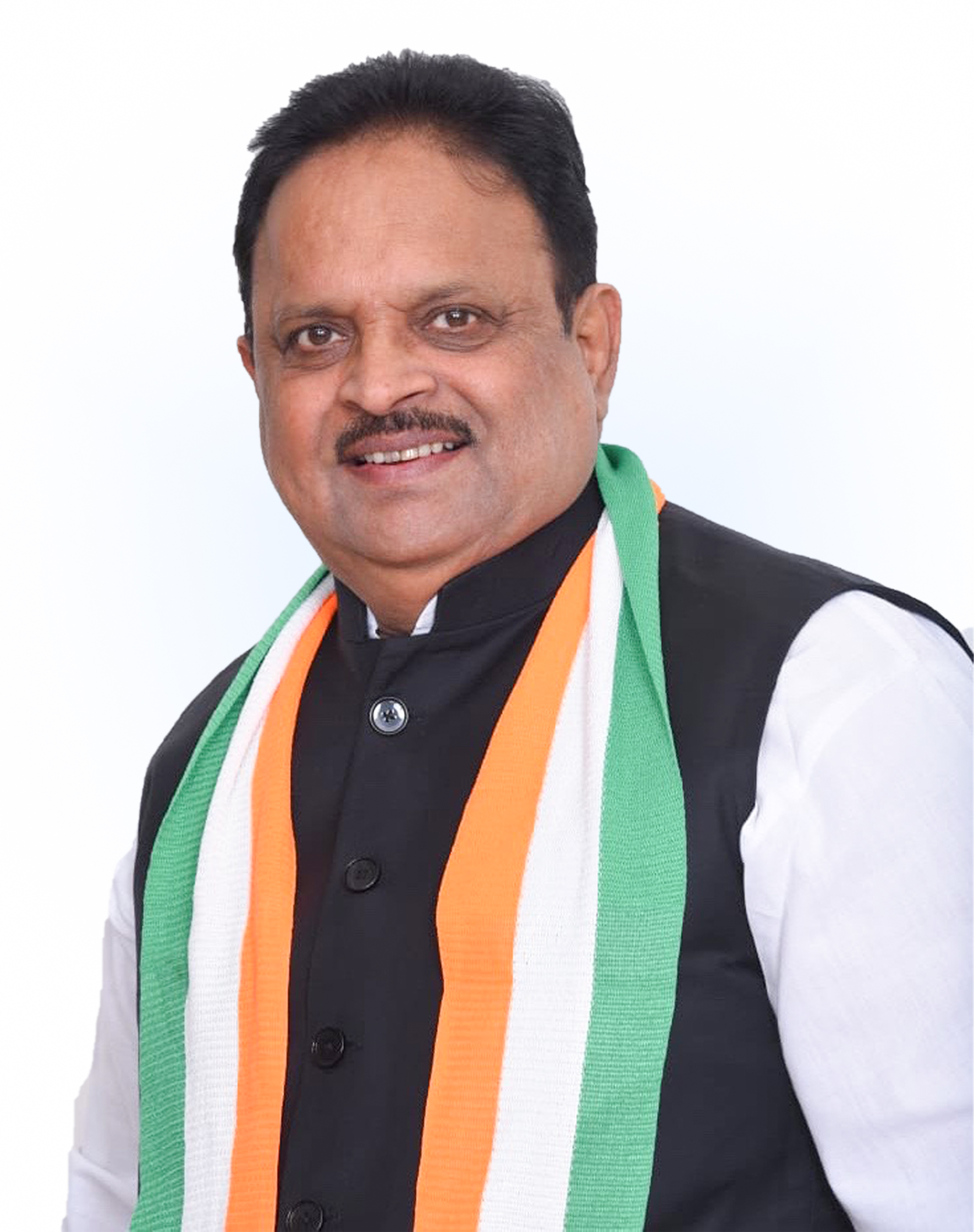

AICC General Secretary for Gujarat, Daman & Diu and Dadra & Nagar Haveli Congress Committee
- In office 7 October 2021 – December 2022
- Preceded by: Rajeev Satav

Minister of Health and Family Welfare Government of Rajasthan
- In office 24 December 2018 – 19 November 2021
- Preceded by: Kali Charan Saraf
- Succeeded by: Parsadi Lal Meena

Member of the Rajasthan Legislative Assembly
- In office 2018–2023
- Succeeded by: Shatrughan Gautam
- Constituency: Kekri, Ajmer
- In office December 2008 – December 2013
- Preceded by: Gopal Lal
- Succeeded by: Shatrughan Gautam
- Constituency: Kekri, Ajmer

Member of Parliament, Lok Sabha
- In office 1 February 2018 – 20 December 2018
- Preceded by: Sanwar Lal Jat
- Succeeded by: Bhagirath Choudhary
- Constituency: Ajmer (by-election)

Personal details
- Born: 26 July 1958 (age 68) Ajmer, Rajasthan, India
- Party: Indian National Congress
- Spouse: Veera Sharma
- Children: 2
- Parents: Shivswaroop Sharma (father); Kanta Devi (mother)
- Education: University of Rajasthan (B.Sc, LLB, MBA); R. A. Podar Institute of Management (Ph.D. in Management)
- Profession: Politician

Raghu Sharma (born 26 July 1958) is an Indian politician from Indian National Congress, who has served as the AICC in-charge of party affairs in Gujarat, Daman and Diu, and Dadra and Nagar Haveli resigned in December 2022 and has also served as the Cabinet Minister of Health and Family Welfare, Government of Rajasthan from 2018 to 2021. He was the Member of the Rajasthan Legislative Assembly from Kekri constituency, Ajmer district.

== Political career ==
He is a two time MLA from Kekri constituency. He was a member of parliament from Ajmer Parliamentary Constituency elected in by-election, 2018 as INC candidate. He has also served as Chief Whip in Rajasthan Legislative Assembly 2008–2013 in Government of Rajasthan. He was appointed AICC in-charge of party affairs in Gujarat, Daman and Diu, and Dadra and Nagar Haveli on 7 October 2021.

=== Positions held ===
Year	Position
2008-13	Member, 13th Rajasthan Assembly from Kekri (Rajasthan Assembly constituency): Govt. Chief Whip, Rajasthan Vidhan Sabha (with Cabinet Minister Status); Member, Public Account Committee
2018-2019	Elected to the 16th Lok Sabha in a By-Election from Ajmer: Member, Consultative Committee, Ministry of Rural Development, Panchayati Raj and Mines; Member, Standing Committee on Science & Technology, Environment & Forests
2018–2021.	Member, Fifteenth Rajasthan Legislative Assembly from Kekri (Rajasthan Assembly constituency): Cabinet Minister For Medical & Health Department, Government of Rajasthan; Cabinet Minister For Ayurved & Indian Medical Department, Government of Rajasthan; Cabinet Minister For Medical & Health Services (ESI) Department, Government of Rajasthan; Cabinet Minister For Information & Public Relation Department, Government of Rajasthan

=== Other Positions Held ===
Position	Organisation
President	Maharaja College, Jaipur
Apex President	Students Union University of Rajasthan, Jaipur
General Secretary	Rajasthan Youth Congress
Vice President	Rajasthan Youth Congress
President	Rajasthan Youth Congress
INC Candidate	Bhinai Legislative Assembly Constituency
Secretary	Rajasthan Pradesh Congress Committee
INC Candidate	Jaipur (Lok Sabha constituency)
Spokesperson	Rajasthan Pradesh Congress Committee
General Secretary	Rajasthan Pradesh Congress Committee
Chairman	Media Department Rajasthan Pradesh Congress Committee
Vice President	Rajasthan Pradesh Congress Committee
Member	Senate and Syndicate, University of Rajasthan
Member	Board of Management, Maharshi Dayanand Saraswati University
Member	National Textiles Corporation (N.T.C.)
Chairman	2018 Legislative Election Campaign Committee, Rajasthan Pradesh Congress Committee
Chairman	2019 Loksabha Election Campaign Committee, Rajasthan Pradesh Congress Committee
Jaipur District President	All India Chess Federation
AICC In-Charge	Party affairs in Gujarat, Daman and Diu, and Dadra and Nagar Haveli
Member	Congress Steering Committee
