= Narayan (politician) =

Indian politician

Ram Narayan was an Indian politician. He was elected to the Ajmer Legislative Assembly in the 1952 election, standing as the Indian National Congress candidate for the Scheduled Caste seat in the Jethana constituency. He obtained 2,968 votes.

Narayan died soon after being elected a legislator. A by-election was held in March 1953 to fill the vacant seat.
