= Ajmer Legislative Assembly =

Vidhan Sabha of Ajmer State, India

The Ajmer Legislative Assembly was the Vidhan Sabha (Legislative Assembly) of Ajmer State, India.

As Ajmer State was included in the Constitution of India as a class 'C' state, a legislative assembly was formed in May 1952, constituted by the winners of the 1952 Ajmer Legislative Assembly election. The assembly had 30 members, 12 elected from double-member constituencies and 18 elected from single-member constituencies.

== History ==
Following the 1952 election, the Ajmer Legislative Assembly had 20 members from the Indian National Congress, 3 from the Bharatiya Jan Sangh, 3 from Pursharathi Panchayat and 4 independents. Five by-elections were held in Jethana (March 1953, following the death of incumbent legislator Narayan), Bhinai (September 1953, as nomination papers had been improperly rejected), Gagwana (by-elections held twice, first in September 1953 as nomination paper had been improperly rejected, then again as the election had been rejected due to office of profit issue) and Nayanagar (September 1953, as nomination papers had been improperly rejected).

As of 1954 Chowdhury Bhagirath Singh was the Speaker of the Ajmer Legislative Assembly. As of 1956 Ramesh Chandra Bhargava was the speaker of the Ajmer Legislative Assembly, and Syed Abbas Ali the Deputy Speaker. Committees of the Ajmer Legislative Assembly included Estimates Committee, the Public Accounts Committee, the Privilege Committee, the Assurance Committee and the Petition Committee.

The Ajmer Legislative Assembly held a session 4–6 April 1956, to discuss the States Reorganisation Act and approved the merger of the state into Rajasthan. As Ajmer State was merged into Rajasthan in 1956, the erstwhile Ajmer Legislative Assembly members were included in the Rajasthan Legislative Assembly until the end of the term of the assembly.

== Members of Legislative Assembly ==
#	Constituency	Member	Party
1	Ajmer-I (South West)	Parasram	Pursharathi Panchayat
1	Ajmer-I (South West)	Arjandas	Pursharathi Panchayat
2	Ajmer-II (East)	Bal Krishna Kaul	Indian National Congress
2	Ajmer-II (East)	Harjit Lal	Indian National Congress
3	Ajmer-III (Kala Bagh)	Ramesh Chandra	Indian National Congress
4	Ajmer-IV (Town Hall)	Bhiman Das	Pursharathi Panchayat
5	Ajmer - V (Naya Bazar)	Ambalal	Bharatiya Jana Sangh
6	Ajmer-VI (Dhaldin Ka Jhopra)	Syed Abbas Ali	Indian National Congress
7	Shrinagar	Hari Bhao Upadhaya	Indian National Congress
8	Derathu	Himmat Ali	Indian National Congress
9	Jethana	Narayan	Indian National Congress
9	Jethana	Bhagirath Singh	Indian National Congress
10	Pushker South	Jai Narain	Indian National Congress
11	Pushker North	Shiv Narayan Singh	Indian National Congress
12	Gagwana	Kishan Lal Lamror	Indian National Congress
13	Nasirabad	Laxminaryan	Indian National Congress
13	Nasirabad	Mahendra Singh	Independent
14	Bhinai	Kalyan Singh	Bharatiya Jana Sangh
15	Deolia Kalan	Chagan Lal	Indian National Congress
16	Sawar	Laxman Singh	Independent
17	Kekri	Jethmal	Indian National Congress
17	Kekri	Sewadas	Indian National Congress
18	Beawar City North	Brijmohanlal	Indian National Congress
19	Beawar City South	Jagan Nath	Indian National Congress
20	Shyamgarh	Wali Mohammad	Indian National Congress
21	Masuda	Narayan Singh	Independent
21	Masuda	Surajmal Morya	Indian National Congress
22	Nayanagar	Ganpati Singh	Bharatiya Jana Sangh
23	Jawaja	Chiman Singh	Independent
24	Todgarh	Prem Singh	Indian National Congress
