= Chiman Singh Lodha =

Indian politician

- Occupation: Politician
- Known for: Involvement in the Salt Satyagraha, Leadership in Indian National Congress, President of Beawar Municipal Council

Chiman Singh Lodha was an Indian politician. He was one of the Beawar leaders arrested in connection with the Salt Satyagraha.

He was one of the main leaders of the Indian National Congress in Beawar. Inside the Congress Party branch in Beawar he competed with Brij Mohan Lal Sharma for influence. The two leaders were colloquially known as the 'B' and 'C' respectively. Chiman Singh Lodha contested the 1962 Rajasthan Legislative Assembly election, as an independent candidate in the Beawar constituency. He finished in third place with 9,090 votes (28.94%), trailing behind the official Congress candidate Brij Mohan Lal Sharma. The division inside the Congress branch helped the Communist Party of India candidate Swami Kumaranand win the seat.

As of the mid-1960s he was the president of the Beawar Municipal Council.

There is a statue of him in Beawar at Chang Gate. His death anniversary is 6 September.

There is a school in Beawar in the name of Shree Chimansingh Lodha. CS Lodha Nagar was established by his elder son Mohansingh Lodha in his memory.
