= Swami Kumaranand =

Indian politician (1889–1971)

Swami Kumaranand, born Dvijendra Kumar Naag (16 April 1889 – 29 December 1971), was an Indian politician and leader of Communist Party of India. He was a key builder of the communist movement in Rajputana and Madhya Bharat.

== Early life ==
Kumaranand hailed from a Bengali family in Rangoon; his father was the Commissioner of the Burmese capital. Kumaranand went to Dacca and Calcutta to obtain higher education. After meeting Swami Satyananda of Utkal, Kumaranad became involved in revolutionary activities in 1905. He also visited China in 1910 and met with Sun Yat-Sen. Following his stay in China he traveled to Calcutta, where he was arrested. He remained imprisoned for nine years. In total, he would spend 30 years of his life in jail (both during and after British rule).

== Move to Beawar ==
Following a meeting with Mahatma Gandhi, Kumaranand moved to Beawar around 1920 in order to organised resistance against British rule there. He cooperated with Indulal Yagnik in organising a Kisan (Peasant) Conference in Beawar in 1921.

== Independence struggle ==
Kumaranand became a member of the All India Congress Committee in 1920, and was a key figure in the left wing of the Congress. Together with Maulana Hasrat Mohani, he co-tabled the first motion to call for full Independence for India at the Ahmedabad session of the AICC in 1921, a move Gandhi rejected at the time. Kumaranand was noted for having distributed copies of the Communist Manifesto at the event. He was one of the leading figures of the Salt Satyagraha in Beawar, and was arrested for his role in this agitation.

== Labour and communist leader ==
Kumaranand organised a trade union of textile mill workers in 1931, the Mill Mazdoor Sabha, with workers from three mills. This union was short-lived, as it met stern resistance from mill owners. In 1936 Kumaranand founded the Textile Labour Union. This union also failed to make any major impact.

At the Indian National Congress session of 1939, Kumaranand supported the candidature of Subhas Chandra Bose. Kumarand was arrested in 1943, following civil disobedience actions. Following his release from prison, he joined the Communist Party of India in 1945. In the same year, he became the founding president of the Central India and Rajputana Trade Union Congress. In 1948, after Independence, he was jailed again. In 1949 he organised the first clandestine conference of the CPI in Rajputana.

== Legislator ==
Kumaranand contested the Beawar seat in the 1957 Rajasthan Legislative Assembly election. He finished in second place, with 10,400 votes (40.68%). He was arrested following the central government employees' strike of July 1960. Kumaranand won the Beawar seat in the 1962 Rajasthan Legislative Assembly election, with 11,681 votes (37.18%). His election was facilitated by the inside the Beawar Congress Party between Brij Mohan Lal Sharma and Chiman Singh Lodha. During Kumaranand's first visit to the Legislative Assembly after being elected, the Chief Minister Mohanlal Sukhadia greeted him and touched his feet as a sign of respect.

== Legacy ==
In 1975 the Swami Kumaranand Smarak Samiti ('Swami Kumaranand Memorial Society') was established. Statues of Kumaranand stand in Jaipur and Beawar. In 2012 the CPI inaugurated 'Swami Kumaranand Bhavan' as its Rajasthan state headquarters in Jaipur. Rajasthan Chief Minister Ashok Gehlot, CPI leaders A.B. Bardhan, S. Sudhakar Reddy, and Atul Kumar Anjan and CPI(M) leader Vasudev Sharmatook part in the ceremony.
