= Kekri, Rajasthan =

Kekri Kankavati Nagri
- City
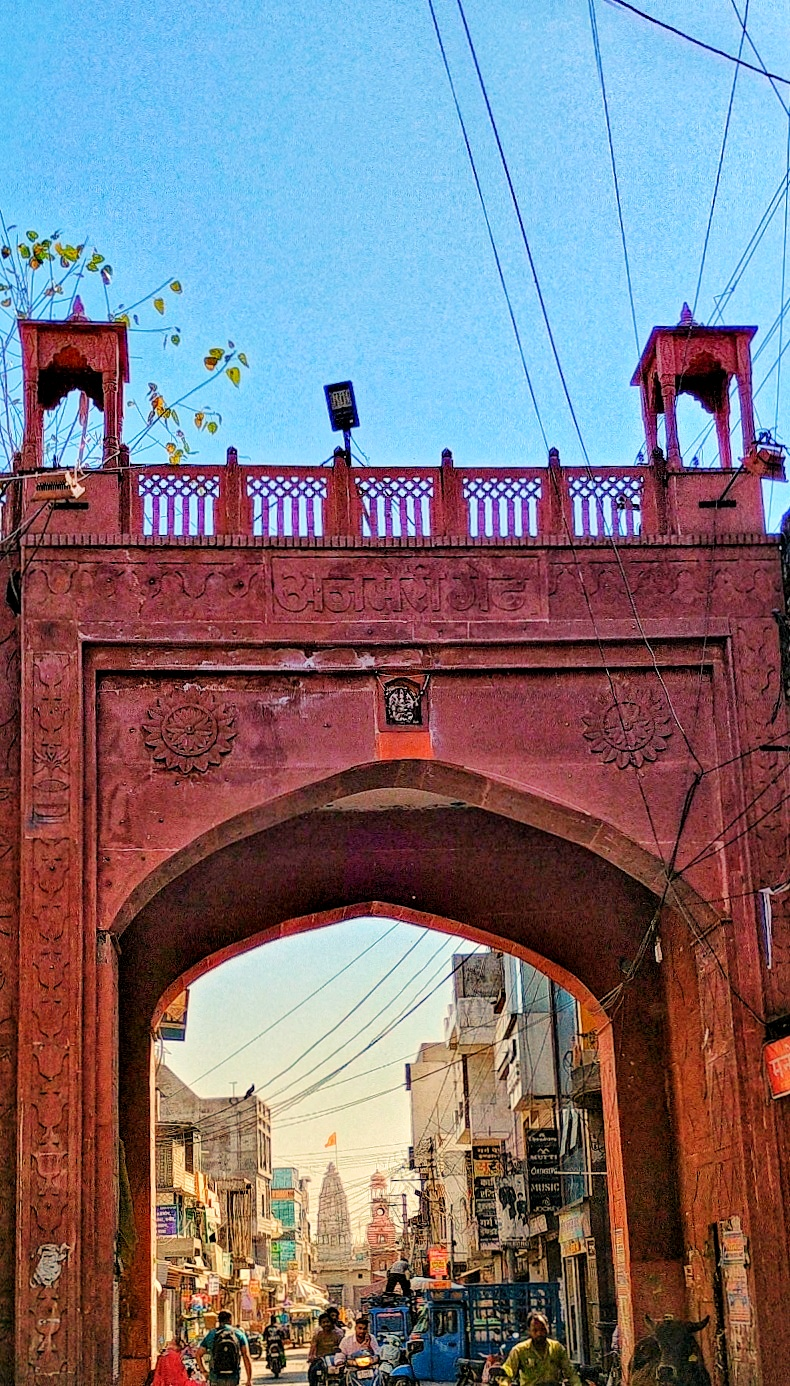
- Ajmeri Gate of Kekri city

- Location in Rajasthan, India Kekri (India)
- Coordinates: 25.97°N 75.15°E
- Country: India
- State: Rajasthan
- District: Ajmer
- Assembly constituency: Kekri Vidhansabha
- Lok Sabha constituency: Ajmer Lok Sabha
- Established: c. 884 CE
- Municipality: 1879
- Named for: Kankavati
- Elevation: 347 m (1,138 ft)

Population (2011)
  - City: 202,758
  - Urban: 41,890
  - Rural: 160,868

Languages
  - Spoken: Dhundari, Marwari, Hindi
  - Official: Hindi
- Time zone: UTC+5:30 (IST)
- Postal code: 305404
- Area code: 01467
- Vehicle registration: RJ-48

Kekri (Hindi pronunciation: [ˈkeːkɽiː]) is a city in the Ajmer district of the Indian state of Rajasthan. It historically formed part of the Ajmer–Merwara region during British rule and developed as a municipal and administrative centre, with a municipality established in 1879.

Kekri was designated as the headquarters of the short-lived Kekri district during the 2023 administrative reorganisation of Rajasthan. The district was created by the Government of Rajasthan through a Revenue Department notification as part of the formation of 19 new districts in the state, carved out from parts of Ajmer district and Tonk district.

However, following a subsequent administrative review and reorganisation process by the state government, the earlier district structure was altered and Kekri was reintegrated into Ajmer district.

In recent years, Kekri has emerged as a centre for higher and professional education, particularly in medical and allied health sciences. The presence of multiple educational institutions has contributed to its development as an emerging educational hub in the region.

== History ==
Kekri is believed to have been established around 884 CE and was historically known as Kanakavati Nagari. According to local traditions, the name is associated with Kanakavati, after whom a memorial (samadhi) was constructed at Baba Talab following her act of sati. Over time, the name of the town evolved from Kanakavati to Kekri. Kekri historically formed part of the Ajmer region. Over time, Ajmer came under the control of various ruling powers, including the Chauhans, Sisodias, Rathores, Mughals, Scindias, Marathas, and later the British. As a result, the political authority over Kekri generally followed these broader changes in the Ajmer region.

The town developed in two distinct phases: Old Kekri and New Kekri. Old Kekri is attributed to settlement during the period of Maratha influence, while New Kekri was established in 1840 under the supervision of Colonel Dixon, then a British administrator. The newer settlement was planned using a grid-iron pattern, with systematically laid intersecting roads.

During the British period, Kekri functioned as an administrative unit under an Extra Assistant Commissioner.

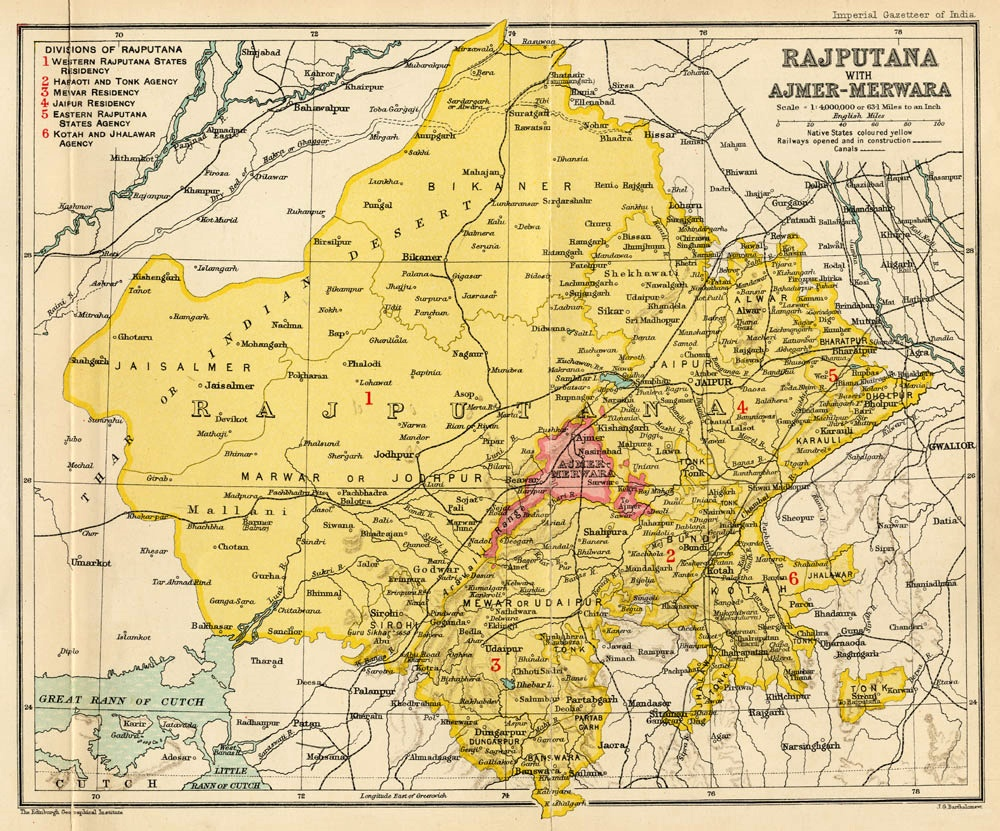
1909 map of Rajputana and Ajmer-Merwara. Kekri was located in the south-eastern part of Ajmer-Merwara and is approximately highlighted in red.

Kekri later developed into a municipal town, with a municipality established in 1879. It was one of the three municipalities in the district, alongside Ajmer and Beawar.

The Town Hall of Kekri was constructed in 1928 and currently functions as Gandhi Bhavan, serving municipal administrative purposes.

== Historical sites ==
=== Baghera ===
The nearby village of Baghera,located near Kekri, is a historically significant archaeological site associated with the medieval cultural region of Ajaymeru. The village contains the historic Toran Stambh (ornamental gateway) and the ancient Shukar Varah Mandir, both of which are listed as State Protected Monuments by the Department of Archaeology and Museums, Government of Rajasthan.

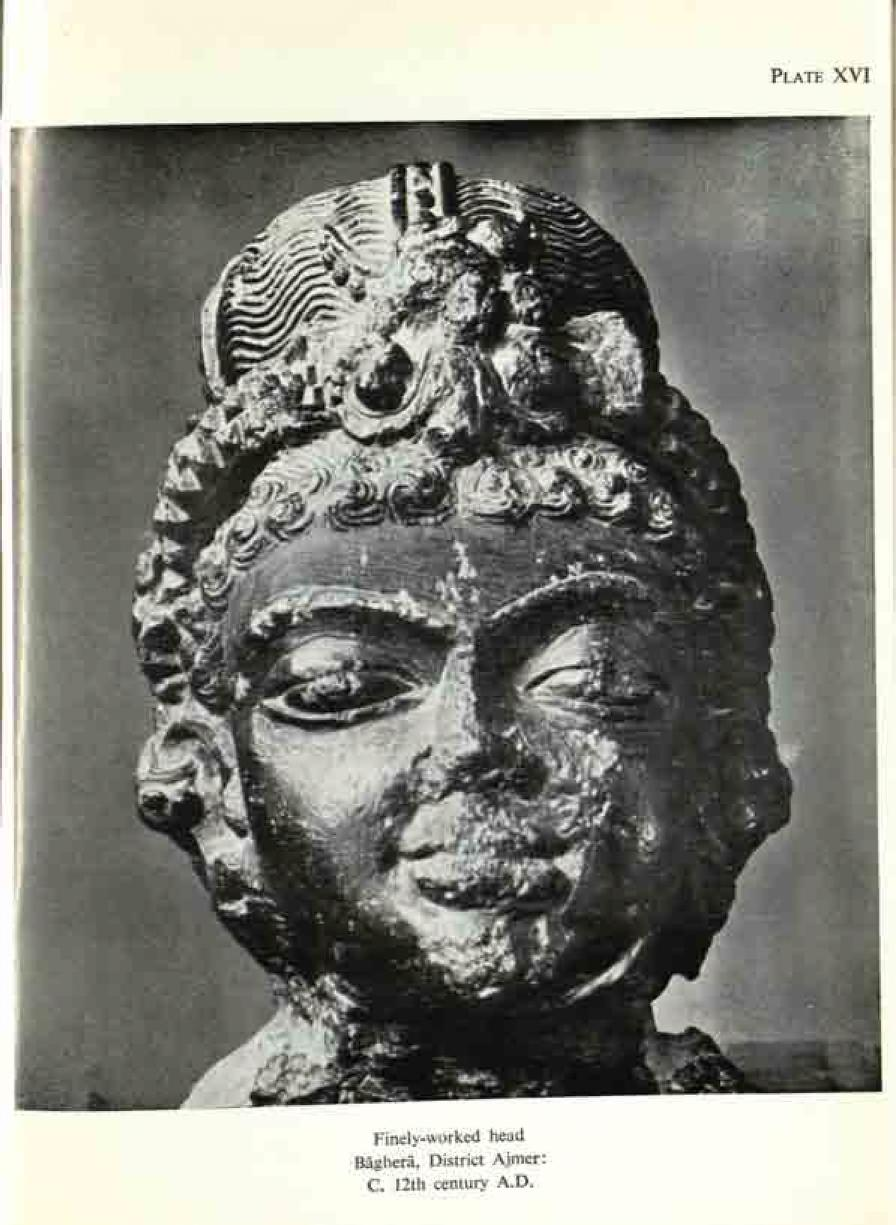
Sculptural head of Harihara, from Baghera, Kekri at Ajmer Museum C.12th Century CE

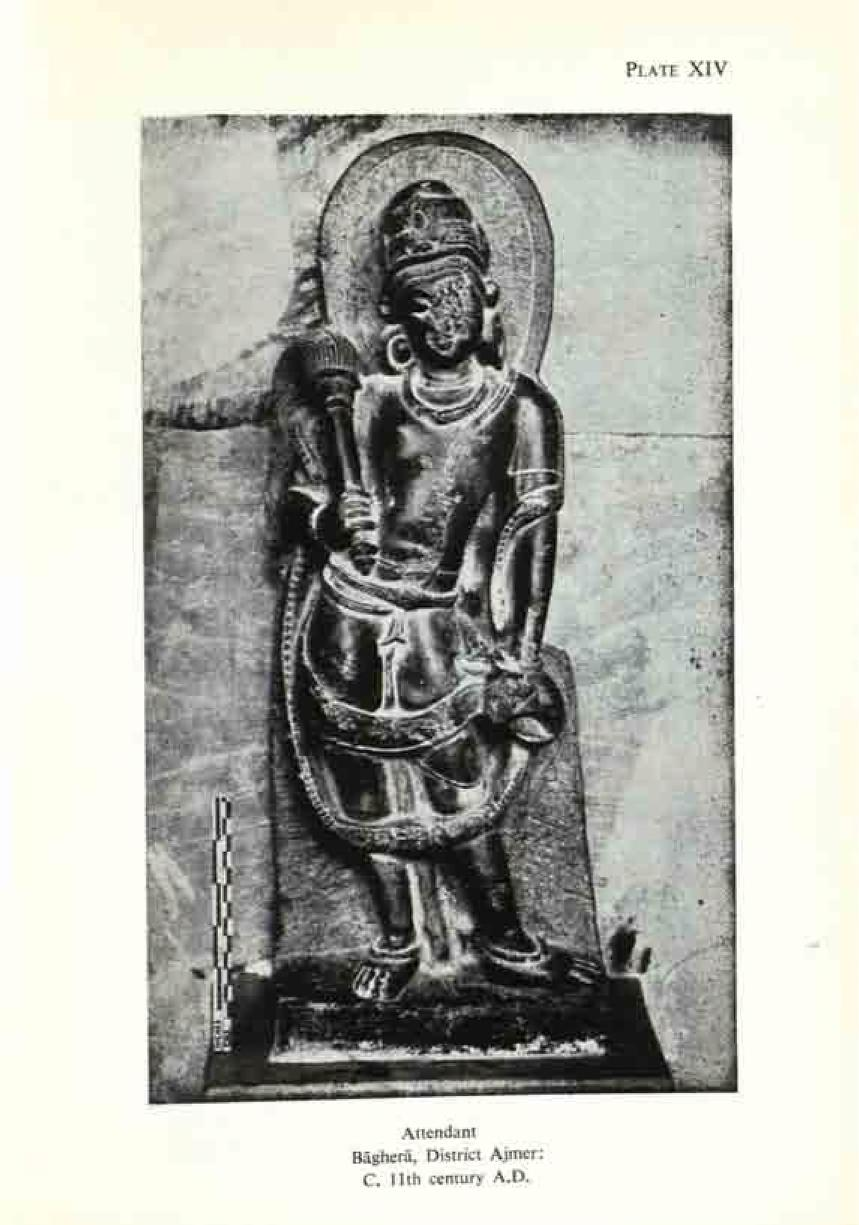
Chauri-bearer Attendent from Baghera, Kekri at Ajmer Museum C. 11th Century CE

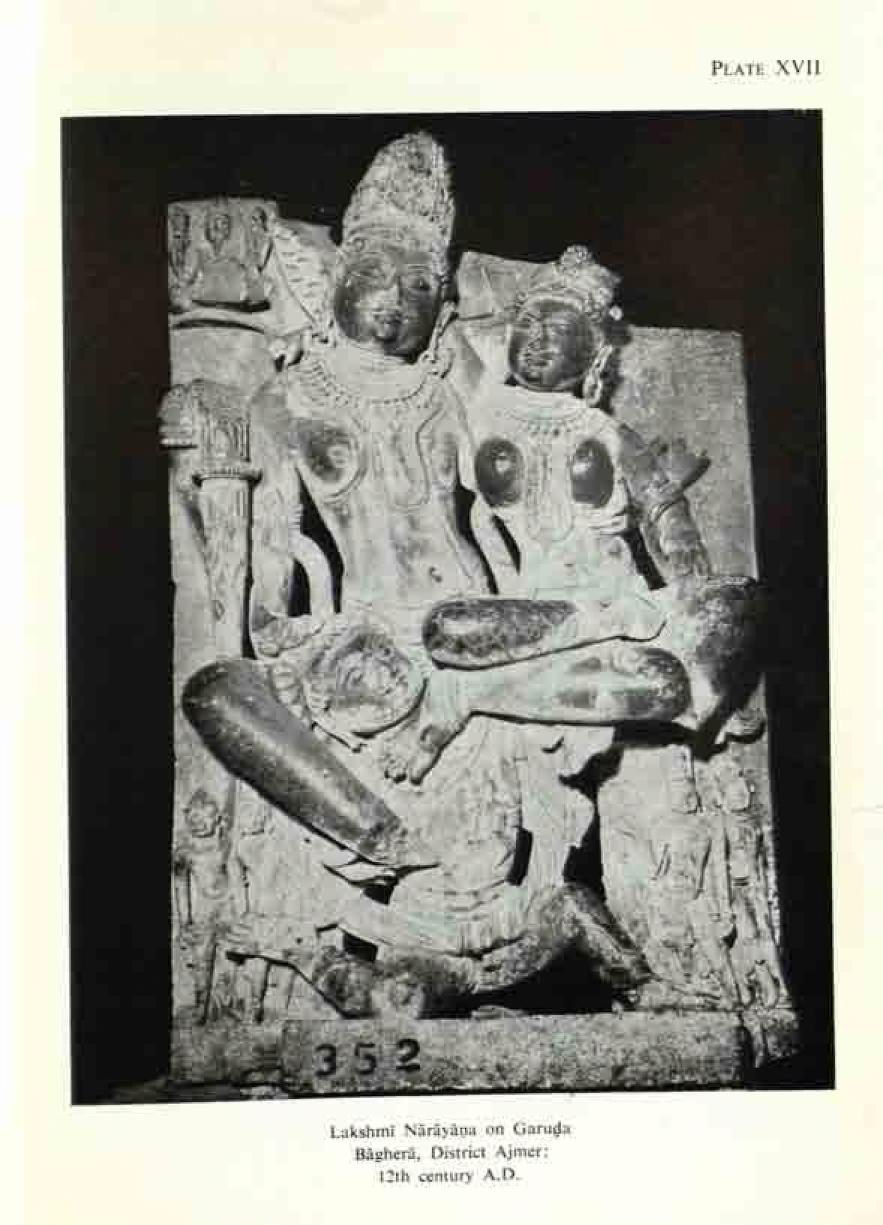
Lakshmi Narayana on Garuda from Baghera, Kekri at Ajmer museum C.12th Century CE

Baghera has yielded numerous medieval-period sculptures, temple fragments, pillars, inscriptions and architectural remains dating mainly to the 10th–12th centuries CE. Artefacts recovered from the site, including images of Varaha, Surya, Shiva and carved stone heads, are preserved in the Government Museum, Ajmer (Rajputana Museum).

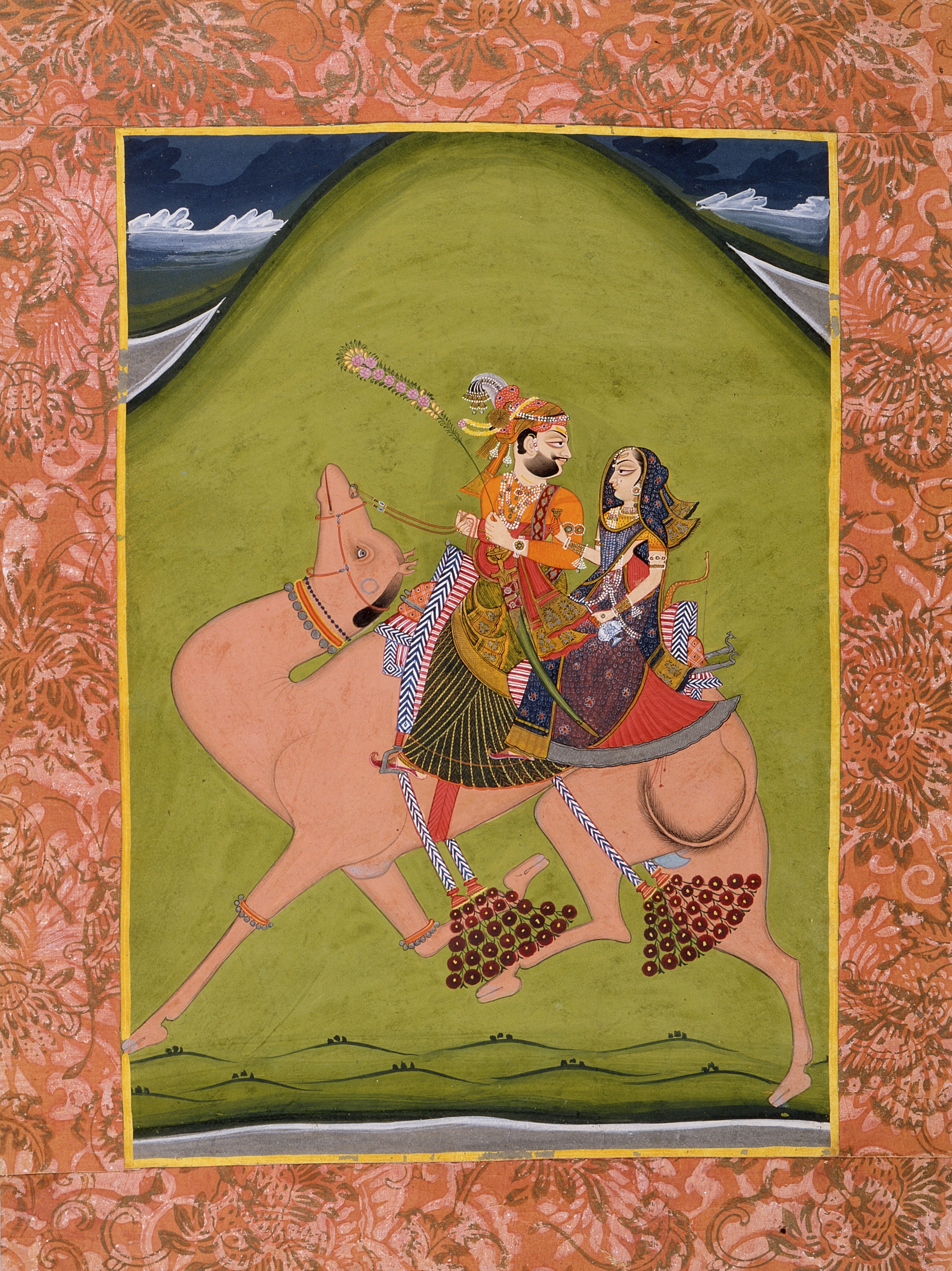
Traditional depiction of Dhola Maru riding a camel

According to local folklore, Baghera is also associated with the legendary Rajasthani love story of Dhola Maru. Local traditions identify the village's historic Toran Dwar as the ceremonial site linked to the marriage of Dhola and Maru, a story that continues to form part of regional folk culture and oral traditions.

=== Junia ===
Archaeological discoveries from nearby villages in the Kekri region, including Junia, further indicate the area's historical significance during the early medieval period. Sculptures recovered from the region include a black stone image of Brahma dated to around the 10th century CE, reportedly discovered near Junia and associated by archaeologists with the antiquarian site of Baghera.

== Geography ==
Kekri is located in the southeastern part of Ajmer district in the Indian state of Rajasthan and serves as one of the district's major subdivisions. The region lies within the semi-arid transitional plains of eastern Rajasthan and forms part of the Banas River basin system.

Topographically, the Kekri block is described as a level plain interspersed with scattered rocky outcrops associated with the Aravalli geological system. Elevation in the block ranges from approximately 301 metres to 547 metres above mean sea level, representing the lowest minimum elevation recorded in Ajmer district. The area is drained by tributaries of the Banas and Khari rivers along with seasonal streams locally influenced by the district's monsoon drainage network.

The geology of the region primarily consists of metamorphic formations belonging to the Bhilwara Supergroup, comprising metasedimentary rocks with associated igneous intrusions. Groundwater occurs mainly within weathered and fractured hard-rock aquifers, which constitute the principal source of irrigation and domestic water supply in the region.

Kekri experiences a semi-arid climate characterized by hot summers, a southwest monsoon season, and mild winters. According to hydrogeological records of the Government of Rajasthan, the Kekri block receives an average annual rainfall of approximately 756.6 mm. Rainfall is seasonal and irregular, with most precipitation occurring during the monsoon months.

Pre-monsoon groundwater levels in most parts of the Kekri block generally range between 10 and 20 metres below ground level, while some southeastern areas exhibit comparatively shallow groundwater occurrence. Groundwater flow in the district broadly follows a northwestern to southeastern gradient.

Agriculture dominates the surrounding rural landscape and depends heavily on groundwater irrigation and monsoon rainfall. Open wells and tube wells constitute the primary irrigation sources in the region. Major crops cultivated in and around Kekri include wheat, mustard, gram, barley, bajra, maize, pulses, and oilseeds.

=== Geographic and hydrogeological characteristics ===
Geographic data of Kekri
Feature	Data	Reference
Elevation range	301–547 m above mean sea level	
Topography	Predominantly level plain with rocky outcrops	
Average annual rainfall	Approximately 756.6 mm	
Major drainage system	Banas and Khari river tributaries	
Principal aquifer type	Weathered and fractured hard-rock aquifers	
Typical pre-monsoon groundwater depth	10–20 metres below ground level	
Main irrigation sources	Open wells and tube wells	

=== Climate ===
Kekri has a semi-arid climate with hot summers and seasonal monsoon rainfall.

Climate characteristics
Parameter	Value
Climate type	Semi-arid
Average annual rainfall	756.6 mm
Main rainy season	June–September
Major water source	Groundwater

== School education ==
Kekri has several government and private schools providing primary and secondary education. These institutions are affiliated with the Board of Secondary Education, Rajasthan and the Central Board of Secondary Education. Formal schooling in the town dates back to the late 19th century.

The Government Senior Secondary School, Kekri (established in 1894) is among the oldest educational institutions in the town and provides education up to the higher secondary level.

== Higher education ==
Kekri hosts several institutions offering higher and professional education across disciplines such as arts, science, commerce, information technology, nursing, agriculture, and AYUSH systems of medicine.

Major institutions in the town include Government College, Kekri (affiliated with Maharshi Dayanand Saraswati University), National Institute of Electronics and Information Technology, Kekri, Govt. Model Nursing Institute and Center for Excellence for Midwifery, Kekri, University College of Homoeopathy Kekri (affiliated with Dr. Sarvepalli Radhakrishnan Rajasthan Ayurved University), Government Agriculture College, Kekri, Government Ayurvedic College, Kekri, and Government Yog and Naturopathy Medical College, Kekri.

The presence of these institutions has contributed to the town’s emergence as a regional centre for higher and professional education.

== Healthcare ==
Kekri has government healthcare facilities serving the town and surrounding rural areas. The Government District Hospital Kekri provides general medical and emergency healthcare services under various state and national health programmes.

The town also has a government Ayurvedic hospital providing traditional Ayurvedic healthcare services.

A government veterinary hospital in Kekri provides animal healthcare and veterinary services for livestock and domestic animals in the region.

Primary healthcare services in nearby rural areas are supported through government primary health centres and community health centres in the Kekri.

== Judiciary ==
=== Kekri Court Complex ===
The Kekri Court Complex is a subordinate judicial establishment located in Kekri, in the Ajmer district of Rajasthan, India. It functions under the Ajmer District Courts and is part of the judicial system of Rajasthan.

The complex handles civil and criminal cases at the subordinate level and includes courts of Additional District and Sessions Judges and Additional Chief Judicial Magistrates.

Courts functioning at the complex include:

- Additional District and Sessions Judge No. 1, Kekri
- Additional District and Sessions Judge No. 2, Kekri
- Additional Chief Judicial Magistrate No. 1, Kekri
- Additional Chief Judicial Magistrate No. 2, Kekri
- Civil Judge and Judicial Magistrate Court, Kekri

== Transport ==
=== RSRTC Depot ===
The Kekri RSRTC Depot is a bus depot of the Rajasthan State Road Transport Corporation (RSRTC), serving Kekri and surrounding regions in Ajmer district. RSRTC is the primary provider of intercity bus transport in Rajasthan.

The depot facilitates operation and maintenance of roadways buses and supports passenger transport services connecting Kekri with various cities across Rajasthan. The establishment of the depot has strengthened public transport infrastructure in the region.

Additionally, Kekri has an RSRTC bus stand providing passenger enquiry and bus services.

==== District Transport Office ====
The District Transport Office (DTO), Kekri is a regional unit of the Transport Department, Government of Rajasthan. It administers motor vehicle services in Kekri and nearby areas of Ajmer district.

Vehicles registered in Kekri bear the registration code RJ-48. The office provides services such as vehicle registration, driving licence issuance and renewal, collection of road taxes, issuance of permits, and vehicle fitness certification.

=== Rail ===
The nearest major railway station to Kekri is Nasirabad railway station, which connects the region with major cities of Rajasthan and India.

=== Air ===
The nearest airport is Kishangarh Airport (Ajmer Airport), located near Kishangarh in Ajmer district.

== Notable people ==
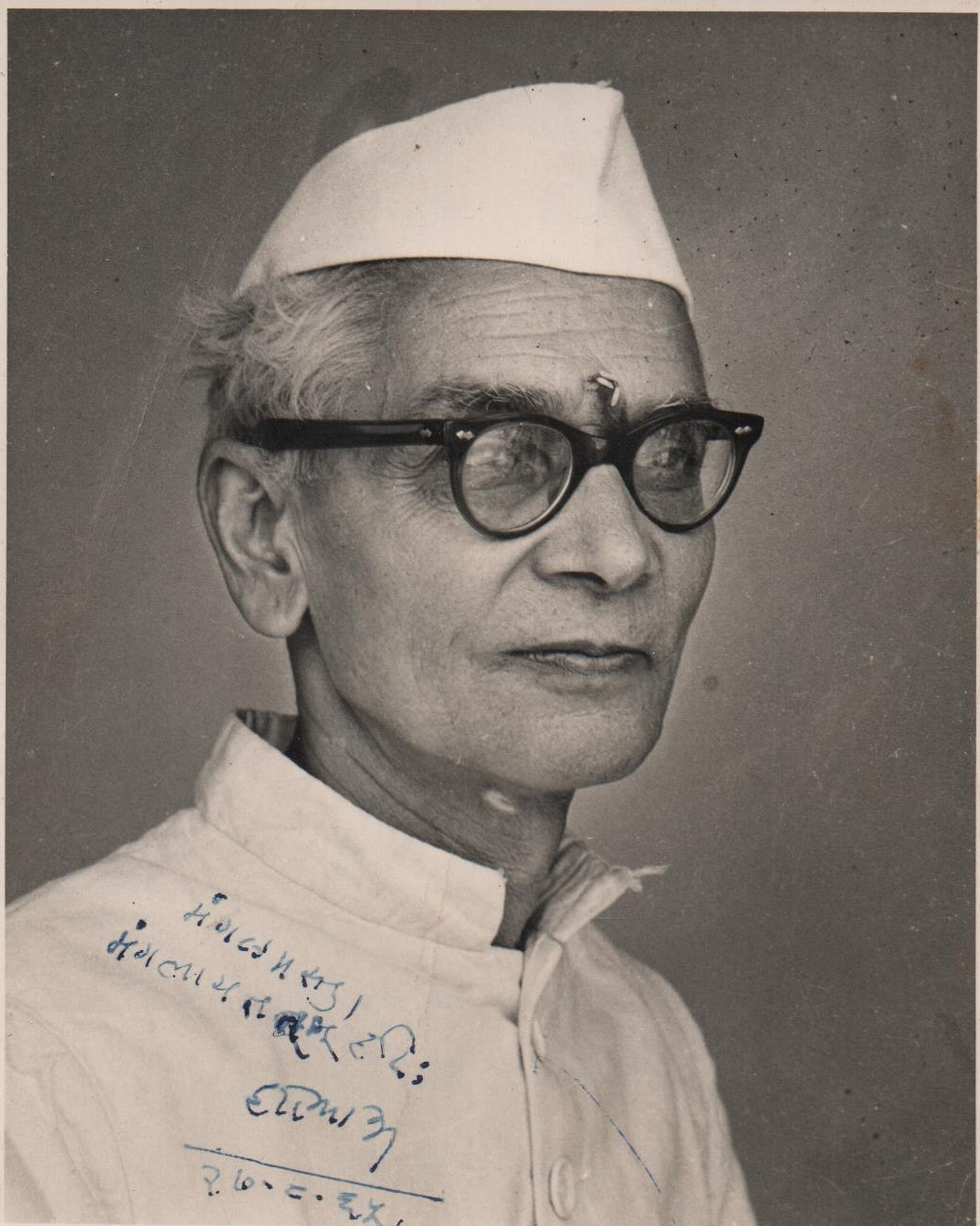
Haribhau Upadhyay

- Haribhau Upadhyay (1892–1972) was a freedom fighter, the first Chief Minister of Ajmer, and a prominent leader of the Indian National Congress. He represented the Kekri constituency as an MLA for two terms (1957–1967) and served as the Finance and Education Minister of Rajasthan.

== Places of interest ==
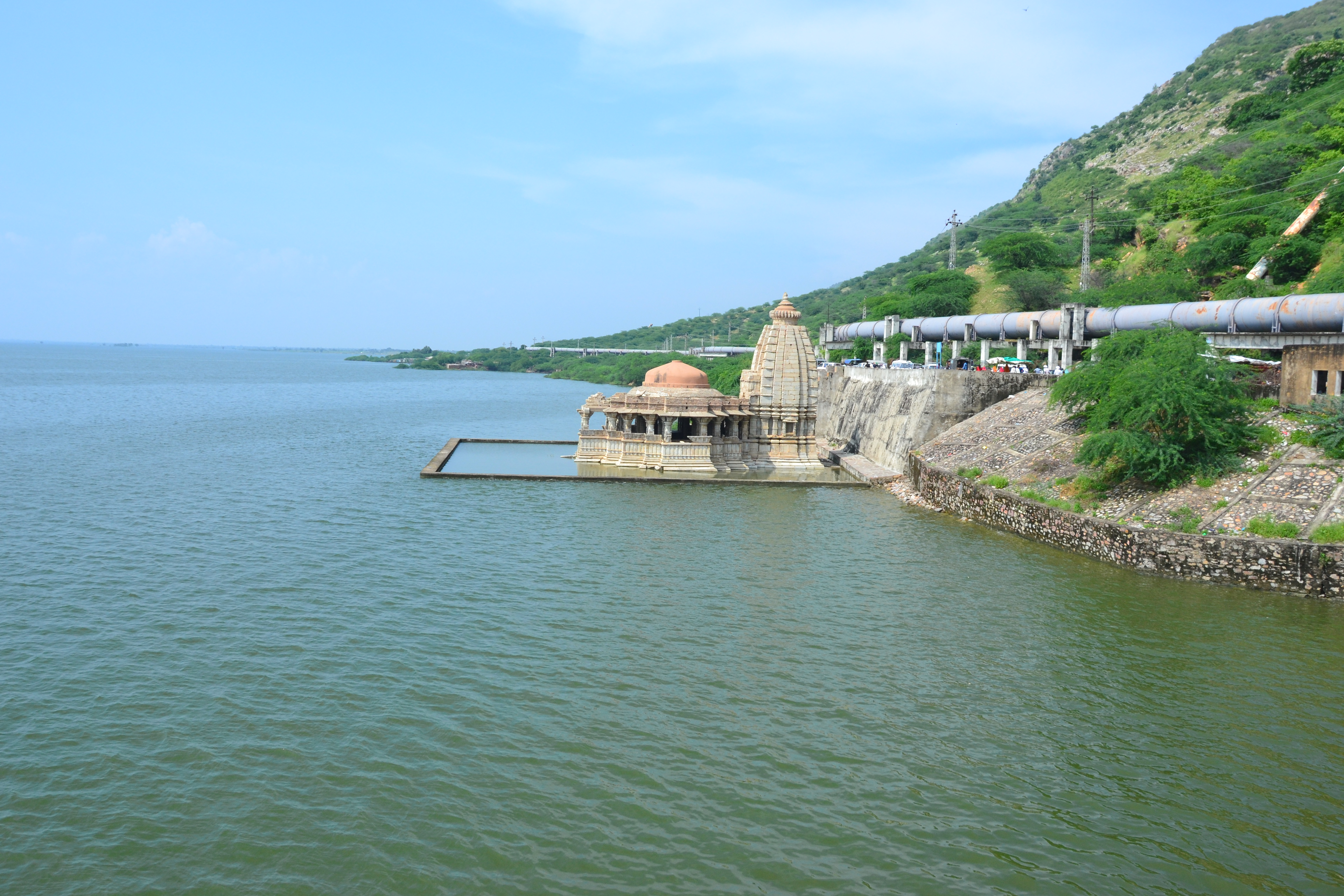
Bisaldeo Temple

- Bisalpur Dam – a major reservoir in Tonk district located about 55 km from Kekri.

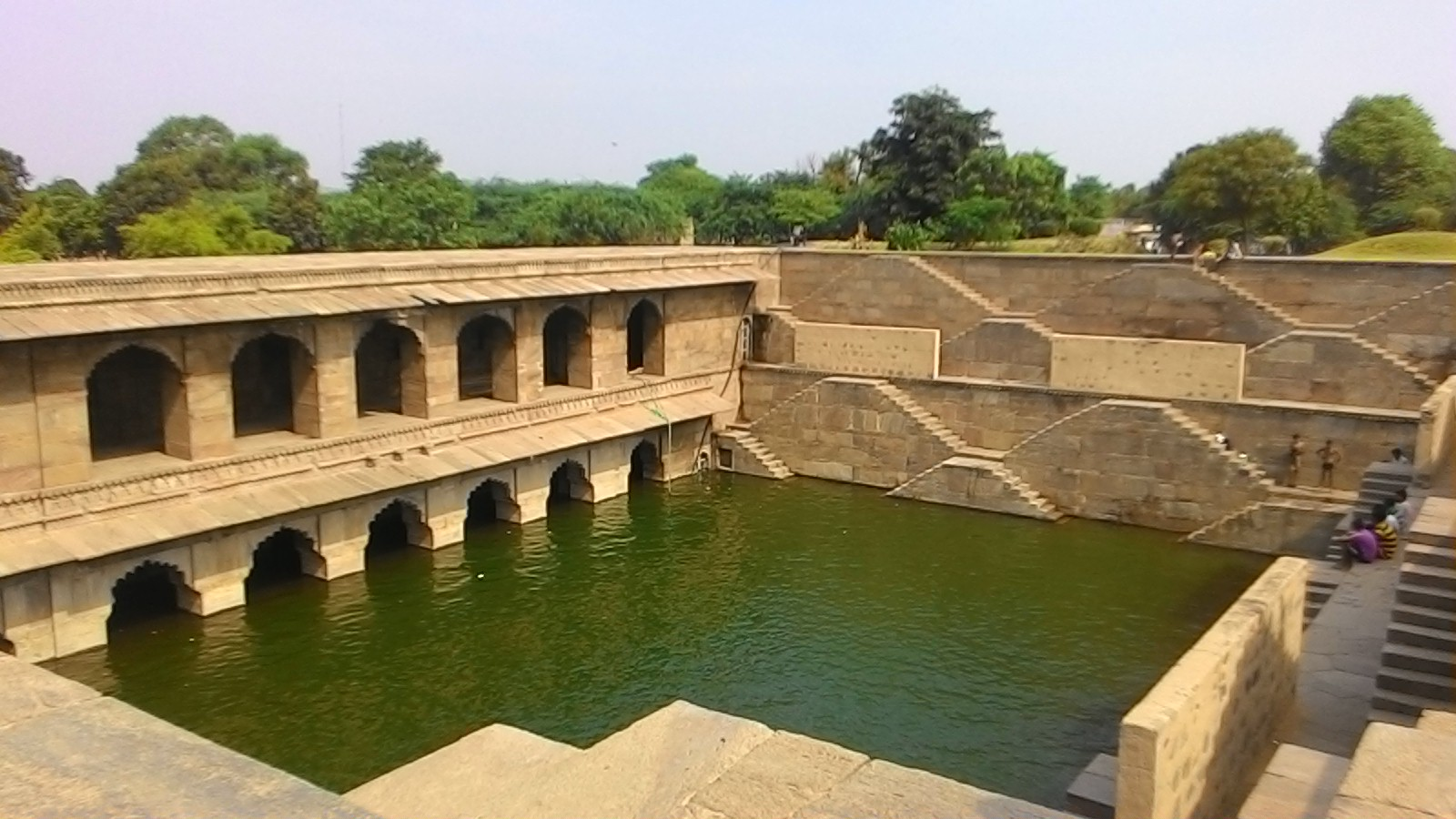
Hadirani ka Kund

- Hadirani ka Kund - a historical tourist site located about 40 km from Kekri.

Ramdwara at Ramsnehi

- Ramsnehi Ramdwara – a prominent religious and spiritual site located about 55 km from Kekri.
- Negadiya Bridge – a notable bridge and local attraction near the region.
- Fatehgarh Fort – a historic fort located near Kekri.

== Nearby cities and towns ==
- Sarwar
- Sawar
- Deoli
- Malpura
- Shahpura
- Ajmer
- Todaraisingh

== See also ==
- Kekri Assembly constituency
- Kekri district
- Ajmer
- Ajmer Lok Sabha constituency
