= Bhaurasa =

- Town
- Location in Madhya Pradesh, India Bhaurasa (India)
- Coordinates: 22°59′33″N 76°12′37″E
- Country: India
- State: Madhya Pradesh
- District: Dewas

Population (2001)
  - Total: 10,405

Languages
  - Official: Hindi
- Time zone: UTC+5:30 (IST)
- ISO 3166 code: IN-MP
- Vehicle registration: MP

Bhaurasa is a town and a nagar panchayat in Dewas district in the state of Madhya Pradesh, India.

== Demographics ==
As of 2001 India census, Bhaurasa had a population of 10,405. Males constitute 52% of the population and females 48%. Bhaurasa has an average literacy rate of 60%; with male literacy of 70% and female literacy of 48%. 17% of the population is under 6 years of age.20 km from Dewas.
