= Haribhau Upadhyaya =

1st Chief Minister of Ajmer State, India

Pt. Haribhau Upadhyaya
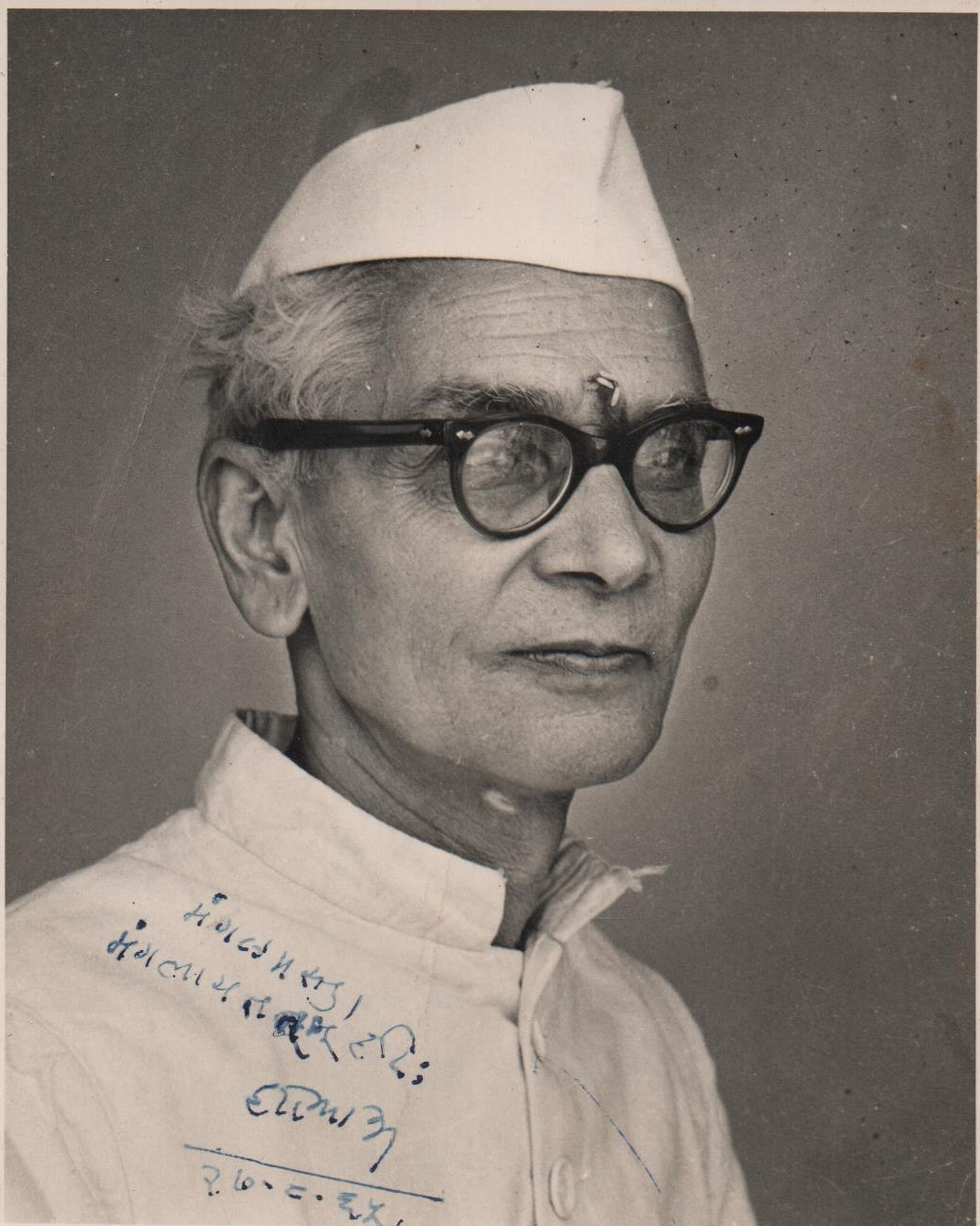

Chief Minister of Ajmer State
- In office 24 March 1952 – 31 October 1956
- Preceded by: Office Established
- Succeeded by: Office Abolished
- Constituency: Shrinagar

Member of the Rajasthan Legislative Assembly
- In office 1957–1967
- Constituency: Kekri

Finance Minister Government of Rajasthan
- In office 1957–1962

Minister of Education, Industries, Civil Supplies and Devasthan, Government of Rajasthan
- In office 1962–1967

Personal details
- Born: 1892 Bhaurasa, Central India Agency, British India
- Died: 25 August 1972 (aged 79-80) Hatundi Ajmer
- Party: Indian National Congress
- Awards: Padma Bhushan
- Nickname: Da Sahab

Haribhau Upadhyaya was an Indian politician and an Indian independence activist. He was the Chief Minister of Ajmer State from 1952 to 1956.

== Life ==
He was born in 1892 at Bhaurasa village in present-day Dewas of Madhya Pradesh into an Audumbar Brahmin family. In 1952, he was elected to the Ajmer Legislative Assembly from Shrinagar constituency as an Indian National Congress candidate and became the Chief Minister of Ajmer state from 24 March 1952 to 31 October 1956. He was elected to the Rajasthan Legislative Assembly in 1957 from the Kekri constituency and served as the Finance Minister in the Government of Rajasthan from 1957 to 1962. He was re-elected from the same constituency in 1962 and served as the Education Minister from 1962 to 1967. During this period, he also held charge of the Industries (excluding large-scale and mineral-based industries), Civil Supplies and Devasthan departments. He was awarded Padma Bhushan in 1966. He died on 25 August 1972.

== Works ==
- Swatantrta Ki Aur (स्वतंत्रता की ओर) (in Hindi)
- Durvadal (दूर्वादल) (in Hindi)
- Durvadal (in English)
- Yug Dharm (युगधर्म) (in Hindi)
- Bapu ke Ashram Mey (बापू के आश्रम में) (in Hindi)
- Sadhana ke Path Par (साधना के पथ पर) (in Hindi)
- Bhagwat Geeta (in Hindi)
