= Dhola Maru =

Indian romantic tale

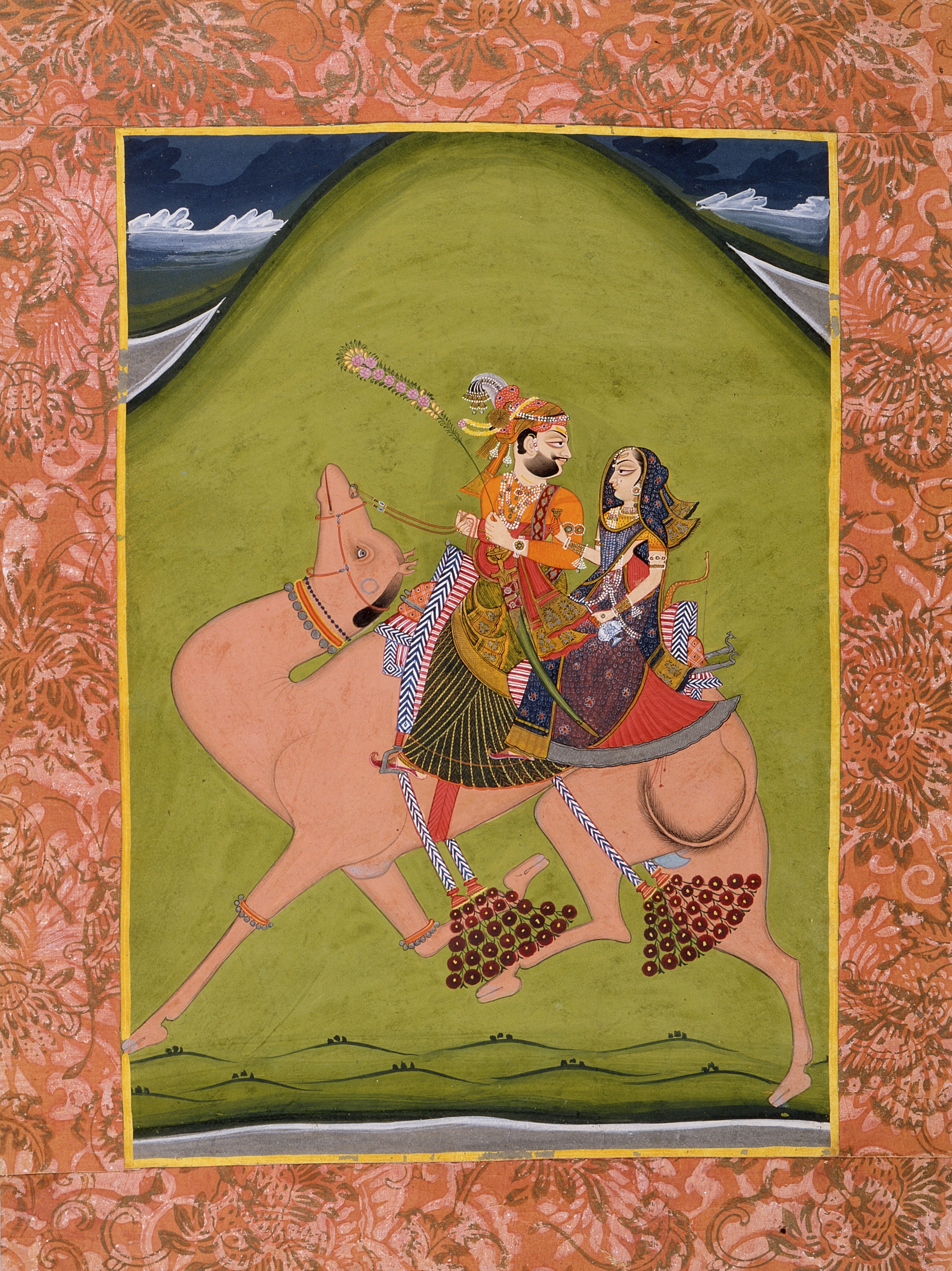
- Painting depicting Dhola and Maru on a camel

Folk tale
- Name: Dhola Maru
- Country: India
- Region: Rajasthan; Chhattisgarh; Punjab

The Dhola Maru, also known as Dhola Marvani, is the romantic tale of Dhola and Maru in Rajasthan. The Rajasthani version is entirely different from a version found in Chhattisgarh. The folktale can also be found in Punjab.

== Literature ==
The Dhola Maru story is deeply rooted in folklore and oral traditions, and it is well-known across Northwestern India: besides Rajasthan, the story is also found in Punjab, Bundelkhand, Uttar Pradesh and Chhattisgarh.

The work is available in both prose and poetry form, as well as a mixed form (prose and verse). The tale depicts one of the most mesmerizing chapters of Rajput and Rajasthani history.

=== Editions ===
Scholarship locates at least three recensions of the story: the oldest to date, titled "recension A", from Bikâner; a second one, called "recension B", from author Kuśallābh, from Jodhpur, and a third one, titled "recension C", from a manuscript found in Bikaner, which contains the story in prose and verse form. Dhola Maru ri chaupai is a book composed by Jain monk Kushallabh in 1617, in which he writes that the story is an old one. Some manuscripts of 1473 also describe the story. Dhola Maru ra doha is the edited text by Kashi Nagari Pracharini Sabha. A version titled Dhola Marva-ni chaupahi is ascribed to Hararaj and dated to circa 1560. A Hindi version named Dhole’maru-ra duha is also reported to exist.

== Story ==
=== Rajasthani version ===
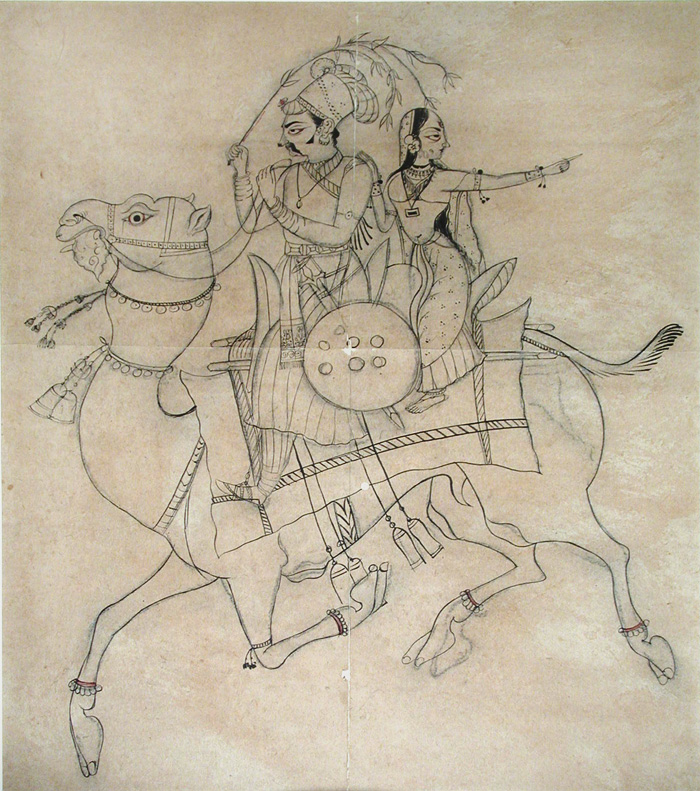
Dhola and Maru riding a camel, circa 20th century

This is a love story of Kachhwaha prince Dhola of Narwar and Poogal princess Maru. King Pingal lived in a small kingdom, Poogal. One day he decided to have his infant daughter Maru married off to Dhola, the son of Nal, the king of Narwar and his good friend. So Dhola and Maru got married at childhood (now illegal) but before they attained adulthood Nal died, and Dhola forgot the marriage vows he had exchanged with Maru at birth. So Dhola got married again to Malwani, while Maru pined away for him as her father king Pingal sent umpteen messages to Dhola which he never received as his wife Malwani had all the messengers either arrested or bumped off.

But Maru got through to Dhola finally through a group of folk singers, and Dhola on learning about his first wife started off for Poogal immediately. However the cunning Malwani was not going to let both lovers meet if she could help it. As Dhola set off she sent word through a messenger that she had died and Dhola ought to hurry back. Dhola, not oblivious of the ways of Malwani, saw the lie for what it was and carried on. His journey to Poogal was uneventful apart from an inopportune encounter with Umar Sumar, the leader of a band of robbers who tried to persuade him that his wife Maru had been married off to somebody else. Umar Sumar was himself very keen on Maru, but Dhola was having none of it. He arrived at Poogal to a tumultuous welcome and Dhola Maru were united at last. Troubles were not over yet.

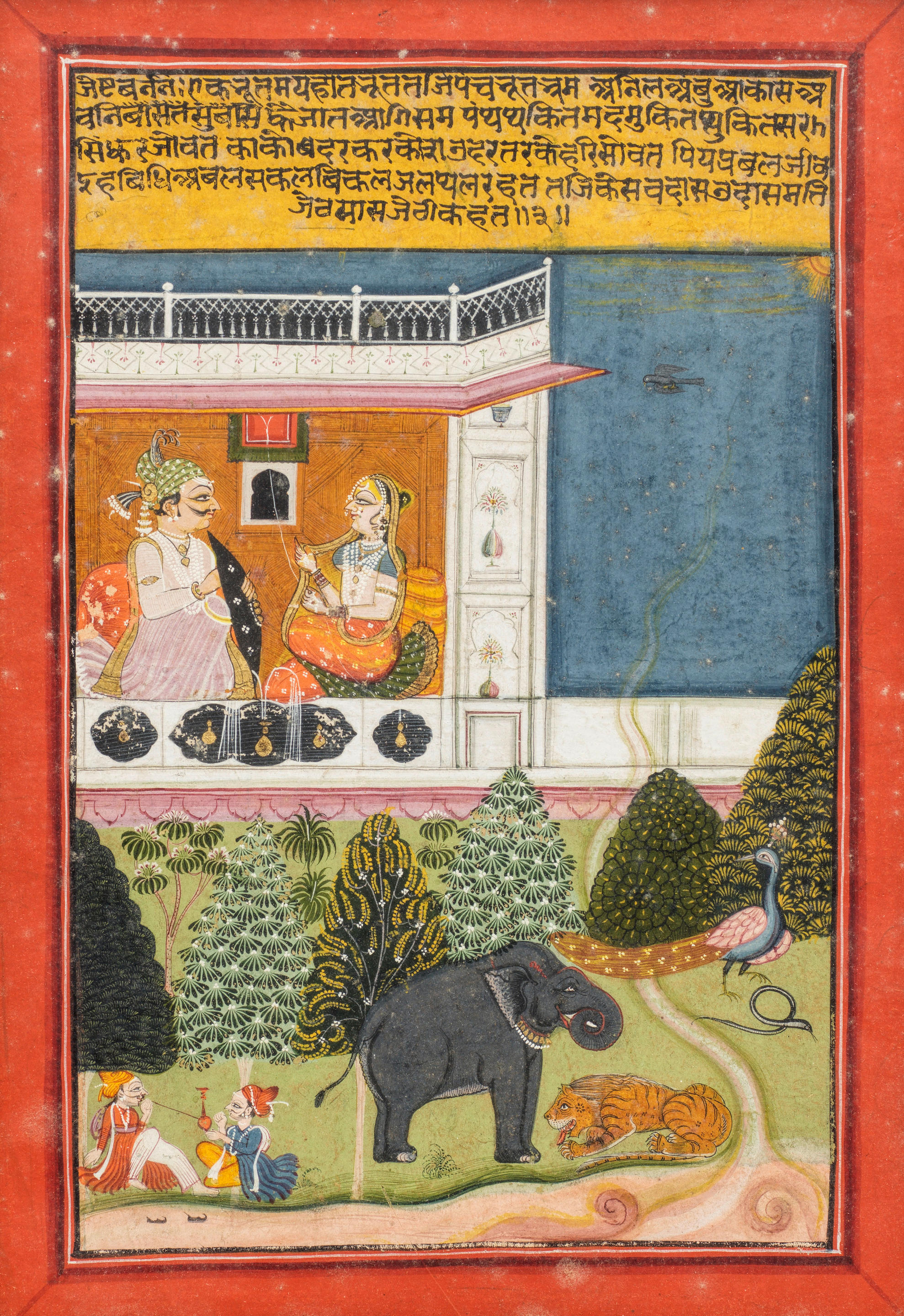
Painting of a scene of the Dhola Maru folktale, Marwar, ca.1820

On the way back to Narwar, Maru was stung by a desert snake and died. Overwhelmed with grief Dhola decide to become the first ‘male sati’ in Rajput history by ascending the funeral pyre of his wife. But was saved in the nick of time by a yogi and yogini who claimed that they could bring Maru back to life. They played their musical instruments and brought back Maru to life. Umar Sumar once again enters the scene. He hadn’t rid himself of his infatuation for Maru and invited the gullible couple to spend an evening with them. However they were again warned of the dacoit’s evil intentions, this time by some folk singers. Whereupon the couple jumped atop their camel and made off for Malwa in double quick time and the couple along with Malwani lived happily ever after.

=== Chhattisgarhi version ===
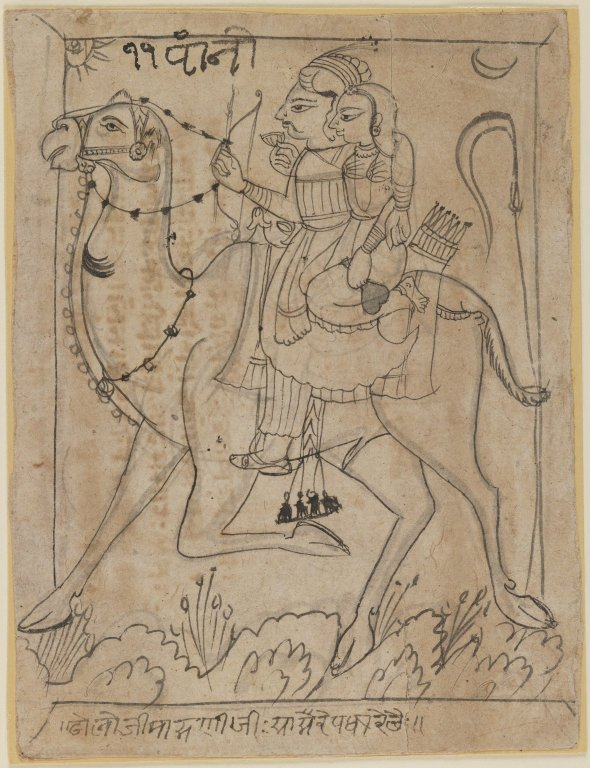
Maru Ragini (Dhola and Maru riding on a Camel), ca.1750

In the Chhattisgarhi version, Dhola is the son of king Nal and mother Damyanti. In his past life Dhola was a handsome young man who was catching fish in the village pond through angle called 'gari' in Chhattisgarhi. Rewa, an exceptionally beautiful woman, who was daughter-in-law of some family in the village in her past life, came to fetch water seven times, expecting Dhola at least to say a word to her. However, when getting no response from Dhola, she broke her silence by reciting following verse which rhymes:

gari khele, gari khelwa kahaaye, au lambe mele taar, saato lahut paani aaye ga Dhola, tai eko naiee bole baat

[You are catching fish through angle like fisherman, and have put a long bait; I came to fetch water seven times, and you did not even bother to speak a single word!]

Dhola replied:

gari khelen, gari khelwa kahaayen, au lambe mele taar, tor le sughar ghar kaamin hai gori, ta tola eko naiee bole baat

[I am catching fish through angle like a fisherman, and have put a long bait; And because my wife at home is more beautiful than you, O Madam, that I did not speak a word to you!]

This reply pierced Rewa's heart like an arrow and filled it with ocean of remorse. Struck by heart-pinching reply, and rejection, she returned to her home and committed suicide by jumping into the well in her family garden called kola in Chhattisgarhi. When her soul reaches heaven, she is confronted by God there as to how come she returned to heaven before completing her actual duration of life-span. She narrates her story of being rejected by Dhola. So God asked her what she wanted. Rewa replied that she wanted Dhola to be her husband. In reply to her request, God said that Dhola is already destined to be husband of Maaru, and thus Rewa cannot have Dhola as her husband for the life-time but only for 12 years. And the story turns to after-birth of Dhola, Maaru and Rewa, where Dhola and Maaru are married in the childhood.

Mother Damyanti keeps warning her son Dhola that he can go to roam around every para (caste-based locality) of the village except Malhin para (Malhin is the caste which sell flower and their main profession is gardening). However, Dhola does not listen to her and goes to roam around Malhin para and is there confronted by a parrot who challenges him by saying:

Tor dadaa ke naak chunavti, huchurrraaaa!
[May the nose of your father be marginally cut, Come On!]

Dhola could not stop his anger, and using his catapult, hit the parrot. The parrot dies immediately and to his surprise appeared an exceptionally beautiful lady who owned this parrot. This lady was Rewa and the parrot was creation of her magic. She insisted that her parrot be made alive again otherwise Dhola has to live with her at her home. Rewa's father, Hiriya Malhin, and others in the village tried to convince her to let go the matter, but it was of no accord. Dhola is lovingly imprisoned at Rewa's house and started living as her Mister.

Meanwhile, Maaru reaches her age of youth and started missing Dhola. She sends various messages to Dhola through parrot and later through Dharhee (probably a human messenger). But both of these messengers were intercepted by Rewa through her Chhachhand (Eagle) and by other means. Finally, Maaru sends the Karhaa (a camel given to her by her parents as wedding gift). Karhaa managed to reach the village of Rewa, but was struck to sickness through magic of Rewa and lives in swamp area for twelve years and thirteen Poornimas (fortnights).

Maaru's geeyan [formal female friend] is married to one businessman (Baniya) in the town of Narour (most likely present day Nandour-Kalan, Chhattisgarh) where Dhola lives with Rewa. She had recently visited her maayka (maternal home) at Pingla (most likely one of suburb of Malhar, Chhattisgarh) and met her friend Maaru who had given her a love-letter to be delivered to Dhola. Maaru had requested that this letter should not be read by anyone other than Dhola as this has some very personal details which she wanted to share only with Dhola. On the eve of Vijay Dashmi (i.e. Navami before Dussehra), this friend of Maaru was combing her long hairs and watching out through the window. The Baniya was making some accounting report sitting nearby. The lady hears a weeping-sound in the midst of the drum-sound of Navami Dussehra celebrations. She asks her husband as to who are those people who might be weeping amidst celebration. Her husband replies that those people are king Nal and his wife Damyanti, who in their old age are wondering as to who will roam through city streets on chariot and receive the johar (greetings) on the behalf king from the citizens of Narour city as their only son Dhola is under house arrest at Rewa's palace. She immediately remembers of the letter that Maaru had given and requests her husband to deliver it to Dhola. But Dhola Kuwar is never allowed to go out. However, as the 12 years with Rewa are about to end; Dhola too feels a sense of uneasiness within and resolves to go out to receive the Johar. After multiple requests, Rewa gives in and agrees for Dhola's visit outside her home but puts a condition that she will also accompany him in khadkhadiya chariot (small chariot tied behind to a bigger chariot). Dhola convinces her that by seeing Rewa behind his chariot, everyone in the village will laugh at him and make jibes about his manhood and kingly authority. So finally Rewa agrees to stay at home and Dhola Kuwar is allowed to go out to receive johar on the occasion of Dussehra. Baniya was just looking for this opportunity to meet Dhola Kuwar somehow.

== Folk theatre ==
The Dhola Maru tradition is also a popular subject matter for the Rajasthani folk theatre (or Khyal), one of the least researched areas of the arts in this region.

== In popular culture ==
The folktale has been adapted into the Indian films: Dhola Maru (1956) by N. R. Acharya, Dhola Maru (1983) by Mehul Kumar.

== Bibliography ==
- Wadley, Susan S. (1983). "'Ḍholā:' A North Indian Folk Genre". Asian Folklore Studies. 42 (1): 3–25. doi:10.2307/1178363. JSTOR 1178363.
- Wadley, Susan Snow (2004). Raja Nal and the Goddess : the north Indian epic Dhola in performance. Bloomington, Ind.: Indiana University Press.

Printed editions

- Vaudeville, Charlotte (1962). Les duhä de Dhola-Märü, une ancienne ballade du Räjasthän, avec introduction, traduction et notes par Charlotte Vaudeville. Publications de l'Institut Français d'Indologie (in French). Vol. 21. Pondichery: Institut Français d'Indologie.
- Miltner, Vladimír; Tesař, Vladimír (1978). "Of the Parting and Reunion of Prince Dhola and Princess Maru". Folk tales from India. London; New York: Hamlyn. pp. 91–105.
