= Chiman Singh Bhati =

Indian politician

Chiman Singh Bhati (died 19 March 1975) was an Indian politician. He was a prominent leader of the Rawat community. He served as pradhan of the Jawaja Panchayat Samiti. Chiman Singh hailed from Dadola village, in Circle Taragarh.

Singh won the Jawaja seat in the 1951 Ajmer Legislative Assembly election as an independent candidate. He obtained 3,891 votes (74.34%).

Ahead of the 1972 Rajasthan Legislative Assembly election a section of the Indian National Congress in wished to field Chiman Singh as its candidate in Beawar, against the incumbent Fateh Singh of the Swatantra Party. These Congress leaders sought to capitalize on Chiman Singh's base in the Rawat community and influence in the rural areas of the constituency. In the end the Congress Party fielded Chiman Singh in the nearby Bhim constituency, rather than the incumbent Congress legislator Lakshmi Kumari Chundawat. Chiman Singh won the seat by a wide margin, he obtained 34,251 votes (83.67%) against 6,685 votes (16.33%) for the Bharatiya Jan Sangh candidate Mohan Lal Mehta. Singh died from a heart attack in 1975.
