= Pursharathi Panchayat =

Indian political party

Pursharathi Panchayat was a political party in India. The party was formed by Partition refugees from Sindh in June 1951. The party was led by Kaka Tilok Chand. The headquarters of the party was based in Khari Khul, Ajmer.

The party promoted the social and economic improvements for the Sindhi refugee community and advocated unity with the original residents of the city.

Pursharathi Panchayat presented six candidates in the 1952 Ajmer Legislative Assembly election. Three of the candidates were elected, Arjandas and Parasram from the Ajmer-I (South West) two-member constituency and Bhiman Das from the Ajmer-IV (Town Hall) constituency. Other constituencies contested by the party were Ajmer-II (East), Ajmer-V (Naya Bazar) and Ajmer-VI (Dhaldin ka Jhopra).
