= Kekri Assembly constituency =

Legislative Assembly constituency in Rajasthan State, India

Coordinates: 25.98°N 75.15°E

Kekri
- Constituency No. 105 for the Rajasthan Legislative Assembly

Constituency details
- Country: India
- Region: North India
- State: Rajasthan
- District: Kekri
- Lok Sabha constituency: Ajmer
- Established: 1957
- Total electors: 261,747
- Reservation: None

Member of Legislative Assembly
- 16th Rajasthan Legislative Assembly
- Incumbent Shatrughan Gautam
- Party: Bhartiya Janta Party
- Preceded by: Raghu Sharma

Kekri Assembly constituency is one of the 200 Legislative Assembly constituencies of Rajasthan state in India. It is located in Ajmer district and presently comprises parts of Kekri. The constituency was reserved for candidates belonging to the Scheduled Castes from 1967 to 2003 and became a general constituency after the delimitation of 2008.

The constituency has existed since the 1957 Rajasthan Legislative Assembly election following the merger of the former Ajmer State with Rajasthan under the States Reorganisation Act, 1956. In 1957, Kekri was a 2-member constituency.

The first MLA elected from the constituency was Haribhau Upadhyaya of the Indian National Congress, who had earlier served as the Chief Minister of Ajmer State prior to its merger with Rajasthan. After the merger, he represented this constituency in the Rajasthan Legislative Assembly and later served as the state's Finance and Education Minister.

== Members of the Legislative Assembly ==
Election	Name	Party
1957	Haribhau Upadhyaya	Indian National Congress
1957	Hazari	Indian National Congress
1962	Haribhau Upadhyaya	Indian National Congress
1967	Devilal	Swatantra Party
1972	Jamuna Solanky	Indian National Congress
1977	Mohan Lal	Janata Party
1980	Tulsiram	Indian National Congress
1985	Lalit Bhati	Indian National Congress

Election	Name	Party
1990	Shambhu Dayal Badgujar	Janata Dal
1993	Shambhu Dayal Badgujar	Bharatiya Janata Party
1998	Babu Lal Singariyan	Indian National Congress
2003	Gopal Lal Dhobi	Bharatiya Janata Party
2008	Raghu Sharma	Indian National Congress
2013	Shatrughan Gautam	Bharatiya Janata Party
2018	Raghu Sharma	Indian National Congress
2023	Shatrughan Gautam	Bharatiya Janata Party

== Election results ==
=== 2023 ===
2023 Rajasthan Legislative Assembly election: Kekri
Party	Candidate	Votes	%	±%
BJP	Shatrughan Gautam	99,671	49.75	+7.33
INC	Raghu Sharma	92,129	45.98	−7.26
ASP(KR)	Jitendra Boyat	2,098	1.05	
NOTA	None of the above	1,547	0.77	−0.21
Majority		7,542	3.77	−7.05
Turnout		200,355	76.55	+2.8
BJP gain from INC		Swing		

=== 2018 ===
2018 Rajasthan Legislative Assembly election: Kekri
Party	Candidate	Votes	%	±%
INC	Raghu Sharma	95,795	53.24	
BJP	Rajendra Vinayaka	76,334	42.42	
BSP	Devkaran Singh Kharol	1,903	1.06	
NOTA	None of the above	1,763	0.98	
Majority		19,461	10.82	
Turnout		179,933	73.75	

== See also ==
- List of constituencies of the Rajasthan Legislative Assembly
- Kekri district
