= Ajmer State =

1950–1956 state in North India

Coordinates: 26.45°N 74.64°E

- Former State 1950–1956
- Location of Ajmer State in India
- Country: India
- Region: North India
- Formation: 26 January 1950
- Consolidation: 1 November 1956 (into Rajasthan)
- Dissolution: 1 November 1956 (by States Reorganisation Act, 1956)
- Capital and largest city: Ajmer

Government
  - Body: Government of Ajmer State
  - Chief Minister
  - 24 March 1952 – 31 October 1956: Haribhau Upadhyaya (First and Last)

Area
  - Total: 7,021 km^{2} (2,711 sq mi)

Population
  - Total: 460,722
- Time zone: UTC+05:30 (IST)
Preceded by	Succeeded by
Ajmer-Merwara	Rajasthan

Ajmer State was a separate state within India from 1950 to 1956 with Ajmer as its capital. Ajmer State was formed in 1950 out of the territory of former province of Ajmer-Merwara, which became a province of the Indian Union on 15 August 1947. It formed an enclave within the state of Rajasthan. Following the States Reorganisation Act in 1956 it was merged with Rajasthan.

== History ==
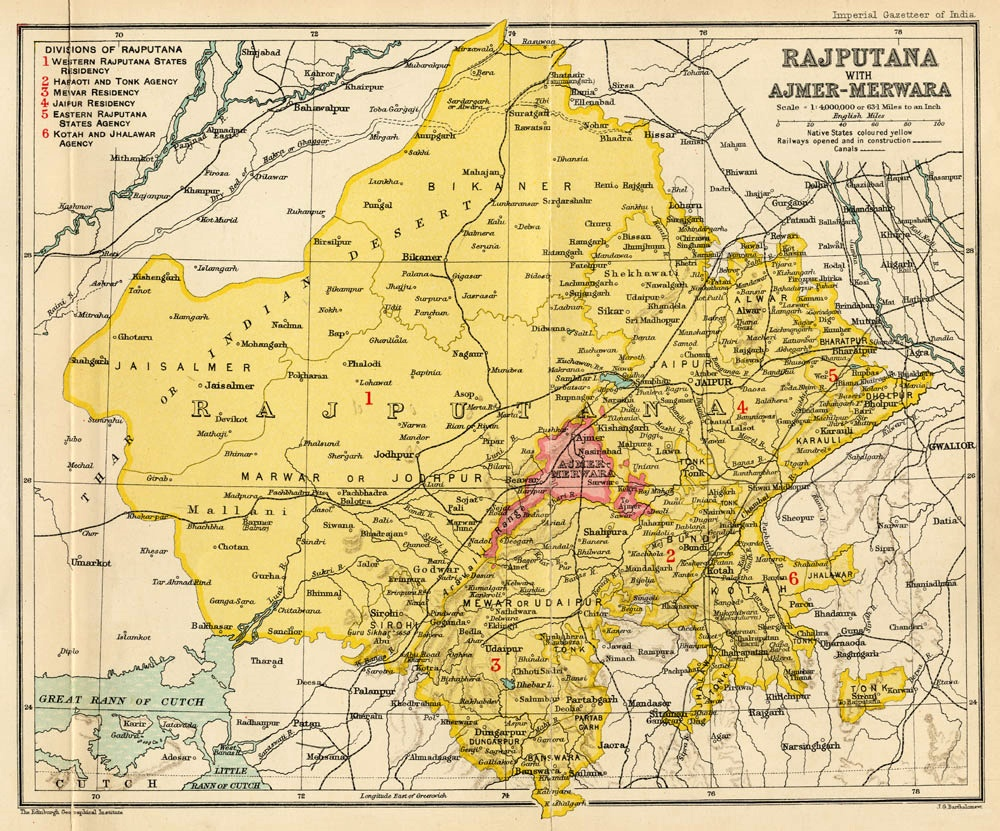
A 1909 map of Rajputana, showing Ajmer-Merwara as separate territory

Ajmer State was formed out of territory of Ajmer-Merwara, which was a British controlled province during British India. The territory of Ajmer-Merwara had been purchased by British from the Marathas in 1818. Upon the independence of India, Ajmer-Merwara became a province of the Union of India.

It was a Province until it was established as a Class "C" State, named Ajmer State, on 26 January 1950 within Republic of India. Class "C" States were under direct rule of Central Government.

=== Dissolution ===
In 1956, when India's state boundaries were reorganised, it became a district of the then Rajasthan state. Ajmer state was merged into Rajasthan state on 1 November 1956. Kishangarh sub-division of erstwhile Jaipur district was added to it to form Ajmer district.

== Government ==
=== Chief Commissioner ===
List of Chief Commissioners of Ajmer State:

No.	Name	Term
1	Shankar Prasada	1947–1948
2	Chandrakant Balwantrao Nagarkar	1948–1951
3	Anand Dattahaya Pandit	1952 – March 1954
4	Moti K. Kripalani	March 1954 – 31 October 1956

=== Chief Minister ===
Haribhau Upadhyaya was the first and last Chief Minister of Ajmer State from 24 March 1952 until 1956.

No	Portrait	Name	Constituency	Tenure			Assembly Election	Party (Note: This column only names the chief minister's party. The state government he heads may be a complex coalition of several parties and independents; these are not listed here.)
1		Haribhau Upadhyaya	Shreenagar	24 March 1952	31 October 1956	4 years, 221 days	1st (1952)	Indian National Congress

== See also ==
- Ajmer
- History of Ajmer
- Haribhau Upadhyaya
- History of Rajasthan
- States Reorganisation Act, 1956
- 1952 Ajmer State Legislative Assembly election
