= Chhatri, Ajmer =

Chhatri Chhatri
- Village
- Location in Rajasthan, India Chhatri (India)
- Coordinates: 26.489969°N 74.6331353°E
- Country: India
- State: Rajasthan
- District: Ajmer

Languages
  - Official: Hindi
- Time zone: UTC+5:30 (IST)
- PIN: 305023

Chhatri is a village in Ajmer District, Rajasthan, India.

== See also ==
- Ghooghra
- Godiyawas
- Guwardi
- Magra, Ajmer
- Khonda
- Ganahera
- Deo Nagar
- Chachiyawas
