= Ajmer tehsil =

Ajmer Tehsil
- Tehsil
- Location of Ajmer tehsil Ajmer Tehsil (India)
- Coordinates: 26.500977°N 74.650396°E
- Country: India
- State: Rajasthan
- District: Ajmer

Population (2011)
  - Total: 577,838

Languages
  - Official: Hindi, Rajasthani
- Time zone: UTC+5:30 (IST)

Ajmer is a tehsil in Ajmer district of Rajasthan state in India. It consists of 4 census towns and 85 villages. The capital of the tehsil is the eponymous Ajmer.

== History ==
Before the formation of the Republic of India, the territory of present-day Ajmer tehsil was part of the former Ajmer-Merwara Province (also called Ajmer-Merwara-Kekri). In 1950, Ajmer province became a "Part C" state, and subsequently merged into Rajasthan state in 1956. Following the merger, the new district of Ajmer was constituted which included the territory of present-day Ajmer tehsil.

== Geography ==
The tehsil consists of 4 census town's and 85 villages.

=== Census town ===
1. Pushkar Municipality
2. Ajmer Municipality
3. Badlya
4. Boraj-Kazipura

=== Villages ===
1. Ajaysar
2. Akhri
3. Amba Maseena
4. Aradka
5. Babayacha
6. Badiya Ka Bala
7. Baghpura
8. Balwanta
9. Banseli
10. Bargaon
11. Beer
12. Bhanwta
13. Bhawani Khera
14. Bhoodol
15. Bubani
16. Chachiyawas
17. Chandiyawas
18. Chawandiya
19. Chhatri
20. Danta
21. Danta, Gegal
22. Daurai
23. Dedula
24. Deo Nagar
25. Doomara
26. Doongariya Khurd
27. Gagwana
28. Ganahera
29. Gegal
30. Ghooghra
31. Godiyawas
32. Goyala
33. Gudha
34. Gudha, Kadel
35. Gudli
36. Guwardi
37. Hansiyawas
38. Hathi Khera
39. Hatoondi
40. Hokaran
41. Hoshiyara
42. Jatiya
43. Jatli
44. Kadel
45. Kaklana
46. Kawalai
47. Kayampura
48. Kayar
49. Khajpura
50. Kharekhari
51. Khonda
52. Khori
53. Kishanpura
54. Lachchipura
55. Ladpura
56. Leela Seori
57. Leswa
58. Lohagal
59. Madarpura
60. Magra
61. Magri
62. Majhewla
63. Makarwali
64. Manpura
65. Miyapur
66. Muhami
67. Naharpura
68. Nand
69. Nareli
70. Narwar
71. Nolkha
72. Oontra
73. Padampura
74. Palra
75. Pushkar
76. Ramner Dhani
77. Rampura Nand
78. Rasoolpura
79. Rewat
80. Saradhana
81. Sarana
82. Sedariya
83. Somalpur
84. Tabeeji
85. Tilora
