= Banseli, Ajmer =

Banseli
- Village
- Location in Rajasthan, India Banseli (India)
- Coordinates: 26.5161°N 74.5522°E
- Country: India
- State: Rajasthan
- District: Ajmer
- Tehsil: Ajmer tehsil

Population (2011)
  - Total: 3,375

Languages
  - Official: Hindi and Rajasthani
- Time zone: UTC+5:30 (IST)
- PIN: 305022
- Lok Sabha constituency: Ajmer
- Vidhan Sabha constituency: Pushkar

Banseli is a village in Ajmer tehsil of Ajmer district of Rajasthan state in India. The village falls under Deo nagar gram panchayat.

== Demography ==
As per 2011 census of India, Banseli has population of 3,375 of which 1,792 are males and 1,583 are females. Sex ratio of the village is 883.

== Transportation ==
Banseli is connected by air (Kishangarh Airport), by train (Pushkar Terminus railway station, Budha Pushkar Halt railway station) and by road.

== See also ==
- Ajmer Tehsil
- Pushkar Terminus railway station
- Budha Pushkar Halt railway station
