= Chawandiya, Ajmer =

Village in Rajasthan, India

Chawandiya
- Village
- Location in Rajasthan, India Chawandiya (India)
- Coordinates: 26.5096°N 74.5200°E
- Country: India
- State: Rajasthan
- District: Ajmer
- Tehsil: Ajmer tehsil

Population (2011)
  - Total: 2,188

Languages
  - Official: Hindi and Rajasthani
- Time zone: UTC+5:30 (IST)
- PIN: 305022
- Lok Sabha constituency: Ajmer
- Vidhan Sabha constituency: Nasirabad

Chawandiya is a village in Ajmer tehsil of Ajmer district of Rajasthan state in India. The village falls under Ganahera gram panchayat.

== Demography ==
As per 2011 census of India, Chawandiya has population of 2,188 of which 1,130 are males and 1,058 are females. Sex ratio of the village is 936.

== Transportation ==
Chawandiya is connected by air (Kishangarh Airport), by train (Ajmer Junction railway station) and by road.

== See also ==
- Ajmer Tehsil
