= Baghpura, Ajmer =

Baghpura
- Village
- Location in Rajasthan, India Baghpura (India)
- Coordinates: 26.6267°N 74.6957°E
- Country: India
- State: Rajasthan
- District: Ajmer
- Tehsil: Ajmer tehsil

Population (2011)
  - Total: 547

Languages
  - Official: Hindi and Rajasthani
- Time zone: UTC+5:30 (IST)
- PIN: 305811
- Lok Sabha constituency: Ajmer
- Vidhan Sabha constituency: Nasirabad

Baghpura is a village in Ajmer tehsil of Ajmer district of Rajasthan state in India. The village falls under Aradka gram panchayat.

== Demography ==
As per 2011 census of India, Baghpura has population of 547 of which 280 are males and 267 are females. Sex ratio of the village is 954.

== Transportation ==
Baghpura is connected by air (Kishangarh Airport), by train (Madar railway station) and by road.

== See also ==
- Ajmer Tehsil
- Madar railway station
