= Babayacha, Ajmer =

Babayacha
- Village
- Location in Rajasthan, India Babayacha (India)
- Coordinates: 26.6861°N 74.7396°E
- Country: India
- State: Rajasthan
- District: Ajmer
- Tehsil: Ajmer tehsil

Population (2011)
  - Total: 4,425

Languages
  - Official: Hindi and Rajasthani
- Time zone: UTC+5:30 (IST)
- PIN: 305811
- Lok Sabha constituency: Ajmer
- Vidhan Sabha constituency: Pushkar

Babayacha is a village in Ajmer tehsil of Ajmer district of Rajasthan state in India. The village falls under Babayacha gram panchayat.

== Demography ==
As per 2011 census of India, Babayacha has population of 4,425 of which 2,303 are males and 2,122 are females. Sex ratio of the village is 921.

== Transportation ==
Babayacha is connected by air (Kishangarh Airport), by train (Ajmer Junction railway station) and by road.

== See also ==
- Ajmer Tehsil
- Aradka, Ajmer
