= Bhawani Khera, Ajmer =

Bhawani Khera
- Village
- Location in Rajasthan, India Bhawani Khera (India)
- Coordinates: 26.4501°N 74.6363°E
- Country: India
- State: Rajasthan
- District: Ajmer
- Tehsil: Ajmer tehsil

Population (2011)
  - Total: 3,688

Languages
  - Official: Hindi and Rajasthani
- Time zone: UTC+5:30 (IST)
- PIN: 305401
- Lok Sabha constituency: Ajmer
- Vidhan Sabha constituency: Nasirabad

Bhawani Khera is a village in Ajmer tehsil of Ajmer district of Rajasthan state in India. The village falls under Narwar gram panchayat.

== Demography ==
As per 2011 census of India, Bhawani Khera has population of 3,688 of which 1,847 are males and 1,841 are females. Sex ratio of the village is 997.

== Transportation ==
Bhawani Khera is connected by air (Kishangarh Airport), by train (Nasirabad railway station) and by road.

== See also ==
- Ajmer Tehsil
- Nasirabad railway station
