= Chandiyawas, Ajmer =

Chandiyawas
- Village
- Location in Rajasthan, India Chandiyawas (India)
- Coordinates: 26.5534°N 74.7516°E
- Country: India
- State: Rajasthan
- District: Ajmer
- Tehsil: Ajmer tehsil

Population (2011)
  - Total: 798

Languages
  - Official: Hindi and Rajasthani
- Time zone: UTC+5:30 (IST)
- PIN: 305023
- Lok Sabha constituency: Ajmer
- Vidhan Sabha constituency: Pushkar

Chandiyawas is a village in Ajmer tehsil of Ajmer district of Rajasthan state in India. The village falls under Gegal gram panchayat.

== Demography ==
As per 2011 census of India, Chandiyawas has population of 798 of which 409 are males and 389 are females. Sex ratio of the village is 951.

== Transportation ==
Chandiyawas is connected by air (Kishangarh Airport), by train (Madar railway station) and by road.

== See also ==
- Ajmer Tehsil
- Madar railway station
