= Badiya Ka Bala, Ajmer =

Badiya Ka Bala
- Village
- Country: India
- State: Rajasthan
- District: Ajmer
- Tehsil: Ajmer tehsil

Population (2011)
  - Total: 305

Languages
  - Official: Hindi and Rajasthani
- Time zone: UTC+5:30 (IST)
- PIN: 305206
- Lok Sabha constituency: Ajmer
- Vidhan Sabha constituency: Pushkar

Badiya Ka Bala is a village in Ajmer tehsil of Ajmer district of Rajasthan state in India. The village falls under Miyapur gram panchayat.

== Demography ==
As per 2011 census of India, Badiya Ka Bala has population of 305 of which 159 are males and 146 are females. Sex ratio of the village is 918.

== Transportation ==
Badiya Ka Bala is connected by air (Kishangarh Airport), by train (Ajmer Junction railway station) and by road.

== See also ==
- Ajmer Tehsil
