= Bargaon, Ajmer =

Bargaon
- Village
- Location in Rajasthan, India Bargaon (India)
- Coordinates: 26.2033°N 74.4130°E
- Country: India
- State: Rajasthan
- District: Ajmer
- Tehsil: Ajmer tehsil

Population (2011)
  - Total: 3,888

Languages
  - Official: Hindi and Rajasthani
- Time zone: UTC+5:30 (IST)
- PIN: 305002
- Lok Sabha constituency: Ajmer
- Vidhan Sabha constituency: Nasirabad

Bargaon is a village in Ajmer tehsil of Ajmer district of Rajasthan state in India. The village falls under Sedariya gram panchayat.

== Demography ==
As per 2011 census of India, Bargaon has population of 3,888 of which 2,002 are males and 1,886 are females. Sex ratio of the village is 942.

== Transportation ==
Bargaon is connected by air (Kishangarh Airport), by train (Ajmer Junction railway station) and by road.

== See also ==
- Ajmer Tehsil
