= Beer, Ajmer =

Beer
- Village
- Location in Rajasthan, India Beer (India)
- Coordinates: 26.3972°N 74.7279°E
- Country: India
- State: Rajasthan
- District: Ajmer
- Tehsil: Ajmer tehsil

Population (2011)
  - Total: 4,709

Languages
  - Official: Hindi and Rajasthani
- Time zone: UTC+5:30 (IST)
- PIN: 305025
- Lok Sabha constituency: Ajmer
- Vidhan Sabha constituency: Pushkar

Beer is a village in Ajmer tehsil of Ajmer district of Rajasthan state in India. The village falls under Beer gram panchayat. Now it comes under newly created Panchyat Samiti - 'Ajmer Rural' Panchyat Samiti, approx 20 km away from Ajmer. This newly panchyat samiti was created in November, 2019.

Earlier it was famous as a picnic spot due to his magnificent water pond (तालाब). The pond was built in the years 1872–1874. It is also known as Foolsagar.

== Demography ==
As per 2011 census of India, Beer has population of 4,709 of which 2,389 are males and 2,320 are females. Sex ratio of the village is 971.

== Transportation ==
Beer is connected by air (Kishangarh Airport), by train (Adarshnagar railway station) and by road.

== See also ==
- Ajmer Tehsil
- Adarshnagar railway station
