= Danta, Ajmer =

Danta
- Village
- Location in Rajasthan, India Danta (India)
- Coordinates: 26.3717°N 74.7044°E
- Country: India
- State: Rajasthan
- District: Ajmer
- Tehsil: Ajmer tehsil

Population (2011)
  - Total: 2,253

Languages
  - Official: Hindi and Rajasthani
- Time zone: UTC+5:30 (IST)
- PIN: 305025
- Lok Sabha constituency: Ajmer
- Vidhan Sabha constituency: Pushkar

Danta is a village in Ajmer tehsil of Ajmer district of Rajasthan state in India. The village falls under Danta gram panchayat.

== Demography ==
As per 2011 census of India, Danta has population of 2,253 of which 1,163 are males and 1,090 are females. Sex ratio of the village is 937.

== Transportation ==
Danta is connected by air (Kishangarh Airport), by train (Ajmer Junction railway station) and by road.

== See also ==
- Ajmer Tehsil
