= Badlya, Ajmer =

Badlya
- Census town
- Location of Badlya Badlya (India)
- Coordinates: 26.4420°N 74.7161°E
- Country: India
- State: Rajasthan
- District: Ajmer
- Tehsil: Ajmer tehsil

Population (2011)
  - Total: 5,111

Languages
  - Official: Hindi, Rajasthani
- Time zone: UTC+5:30 (IST)
- Postal code: 305025
- Lok Sabha constituency: Ajmer (Lok Sabha constituency)
- Vidhan Sabha constituency: Nasirabad

Badlya (or Badliya) is a census town in Ajmer tehsil of Ajmer district of Rajasthan state in India. The census town and village falls under Badlya gram panchayat.

== Demography ==
As per 2011 census of India, Badlya has population of 5,111 of which 2,671 are males and 2,440 are females. Sex ratio of the census town and village is 914.

== Transportation ==
Badlya is connected by air (Kishangarh Airport), by train (Madar railway station) and by road.

== See also ==
- Ajmer Tehsil
- Madar railway station
