= Boraj-Kazipura, Ajmer =

Boraj-Kazipura
- Census town
- Location of Boraj-Kazipura Boraj-Kazipura (India)
- Coordinates: 26.4407°N 74.5990°E
- Country: India
- State: Rajasthan
- District: Ajmer
- Tehsil: Ajmer tehsil

Population (2011)
  - Total: 8,780

Languages
  - Official: Hindi, Rajasthani
- Time zone: UTC+5:30 (IST)
- Postal code: 305005
- Lok Sabha constituency: Ajmer (Lok Sabha constituency)
- Vidhan Sabha constituency: Pushkar

Boraj-Kazipura is a census town in Ajmer tehsil of Ajmer district of Rajasthan state in India. The census town and village falls under Hathi khera gram panchayat.

== Demography ==
As per 2011 census of India, Boraj-Kazipura has population of 5,111 of which 4,527 are males and 4,253 are females. Sex ratio of the census town and village is 939.

== Transportation ==
Boraj-Kazipura is connected by air (Kishangarh Airport), by train (Ajmer Junction railway station) and by road.

== See also ==
- Ajmer Tehsil
- Lake Foy Sagar
