= Bhanwta, Ajmer =

Bhanwta
- Village
- Location in Rajasthan, India Bhanwta (India)
- Coordinates: 26.3742°N 74.5170°E
- Country: India
- State: Rajasthan
- District: Ajmer
- Tehsil: Ajmer tehsil

Population (2011)
  - Total: 4,323

Languages
  - Official: Hindi and Rajasthani
- Time zone: UTC+5:30 (IST)
- PIN: 305206
- Lok Sabha constituency: Ajmer
- Vidhan Sabha constituency: Pushkar

Bhanwta is a village in Ajmer tehsil of Ajmer district of Rajasthan state in India. The village falls under Bhanwta gram panchayat.

== Demography ==
As per the 2011 census of India, Bhanwta has a population of 4,323 of which 2,202 are males and 2,121 are females. The sex ratio of the village is 963.

== Transportation ==
Bhanwta is connected by air (Kishangarh Airport), by train (Ajmer Junction railway station) and by road.

== See also ==
- Ajmer Tehsil
