= Amba Maseena, Ajmer =

Amba Maseena
- Village
- Location in Rajasthan, India Amba Maseena (India)
- Coordinates: 26.3882°N 74.5405°E
- Country: India
- State: Rajasthan
- District: Ajmer
- Tehsil: Ajmer tehsil

Population (2011)
  - Total: 2,677

Languages
  - Official: Hindi and Rajasthani
- Time zone: UTC+5:30 (IST)
- PIN: 305206
- Lok Sabha constituency: Ajmer
- Vidhan Sabha constituency: Pushkar

Amba Maseena is a village in Ajmer tehsil of Ajmer district of Rajasthan state in India. The village falls under Doomara gram panchayat.

== Demography ==
As per the 2011 census of India, Amba Maseena has a population of 2,677 of which 1,390 are males and 1,287 are females. The Sex ratio of the village is 926.

== Transportation ==
Amba Maseena is connected by air (Kishangarh Airport), by train (Daurai railway station) and by road.

== See also ==
- Ajmer Tehsil
- Daurai railway station
