= Aradka, Ajmer =

Aradka
- Village
- Location in Rajasthan, India Aradka (India)
- Coordinates: 26.6315°N 74.7274°E
- Country: India
- State: Rajasthan
- District: Ajmer
- Tehsil: Ajmer tehsil

Population (2011)
  - Total: 2,133

Languages
  - Official: Hindi and Rajasthani
- Time zone: UTC+5:30 (IST)
- PIN: 305811
- Lok Sabha constituency: Ajmer
- Vidhan Sabha constituency: Pushkar

Aradka is a village in Ajmer tehsil of Ajmer district of Rajasthan state in India. The village falls under Aradka gram panchayat.

== Demography ==
As per 2011 census of India, Aradka has population of 2,233 of which 1,106 are males and 1,027 are females. Sex ratio of the village is 929.

== Transportation ==
Aradka is connected by air (Kishangarh Airport), by train (Ajmer Junction railway station) and by road.

== See also ==
- Ajmer Tehsil
- Babayacha, Ajmer
