= Bubani, Ajmer =

Bubani
- Village
- Location in Rajasthan, India Bubani (India)
- Coordinates: 26.5200°N 74.7981°E
- Country: India
- State: Rajasthan
- District: Ajmer
- Tehsil: Ajmer tehsil

Population (2011)
  - Total: 3,465

Languages
  - Official: Hindi and Rajasthani
- Time zone: UTC+5:30 (IST)
- PIN: 305023
- Lok Sabha constituency: Ajmer
- Vidhan Sabha constituency: Pushkar

Bubani is a village in Ajmer tehsil of Ajmer district of Rajasthan state in India. The village falls under Bubani gram panchayat.
