= Ajaysar =

- Village
- Location in Rajasthan, India Ajaysar (India)
- Coordinates: 26.4151°N 74.5756°E
- Country: India
- State: Rajasthan
- District: Ajmer
- Tehsil: Ajmer tehsil

Population (2011)
  - Total: 2,790

Languages
  - Official: Hindi and Rajasthani
- Time zone: UTC+5:30 (IST)
- PIN: 305005
- Lok Sabha constituency: Ajmer
- Vidhan Sabha constituency: Pushkar

Ajaysar is a village in Ajmer tehsil of Ajmer district of Rajasthan state in India. It is situated in the rural region of Ajmer division at an elevation of 466 meters above sea level.

== Demographic ==
Per the Census of 2011 by the Government of India "091603" is the location code number of the village. The village covers 925.80 hectares of area in which 522 households are located. The total population of the village is 2790. There are 1458 are males and 1332 are females. The population in the age group of 0-6 is 576, of which 334 are males and 242 are females. The total schedule caste persons in the village are 103 with only 1 schedule tribe.

== Geography ==
The people of the village speak Rajasthani, Hindi and Urdu here. The PIN code of Ajaysar is 305005. The telephone code of the village is 0145. The geographical coordinates i.e. latitude and longitude of Ajaysar are 26.4233354 and 74.622472.
