= Akhri Village, Ajmer =

Akhri
- Village
- Location in Rajasthan, India Akhri (India)
- Coordinates: 26.5462°N 74.8010°E
- Country: India
- State: Rajasthan
- District: Ajmer
- Tehsil: Ajmer tehsil

Population (2011)
  - Total: 995

Languages
  - Official: Hindi and Rajasthani
- Time zone: UTC+5:30 (IST)
- PIN: 305802
- Lok Sabha constituency: Ajmer
- Vidhan Sabha constituency: Pushkar

Akhri is a village in Ajmer tehsil of Ajmer district of Rajasthan state in India. The village falls under Gegal gram panchayat. This villages was established by Dada Baagri Gurjar, and from here Gurjar of Baagri clan migrated to various part of Rajasthan .
