= Virendra Singh (Rajasthan politician) =

Indian politician

Member of the Rajasthan Legislative Assembly
- Incumbent
- Assumed office 3 December 2023
- Preceded by: Rakesh Pareek
- Constituency: Masuda

Personal details
- Born: 1964 or 1965 (age 60–61)
- Occupation: Politician

Virendra Singh (born 1964 or 1965) is an Indian politician from Rajasthan. He is a member of the Rajasthan Legislative Assembly from Masuda Assembly constituency in Ajmer district. He won the 2023 Rajasthan Legislative Assembly election representing the Bharatiya Janata Party.

== Career ==
Singh won from Masuda Assembly constituency representing the Bharatiya Janata Party in the 2023 Rajasthan Legislative Assembly election. He polled 74,266 votes and defeated his nearest rival and sitting MLA, Rakesh Pareek of the Indian National Congress, by a margin of 26,716 votes. In the election affidavit, he stated his assets as Rs.83.5 lakhs and noted that no criminal cases were registered against him. He was Pradhan during 2005-2010 from Masuda panchayat samiti from BJP.
