= Suresh Singh Rawat =

Indian politician

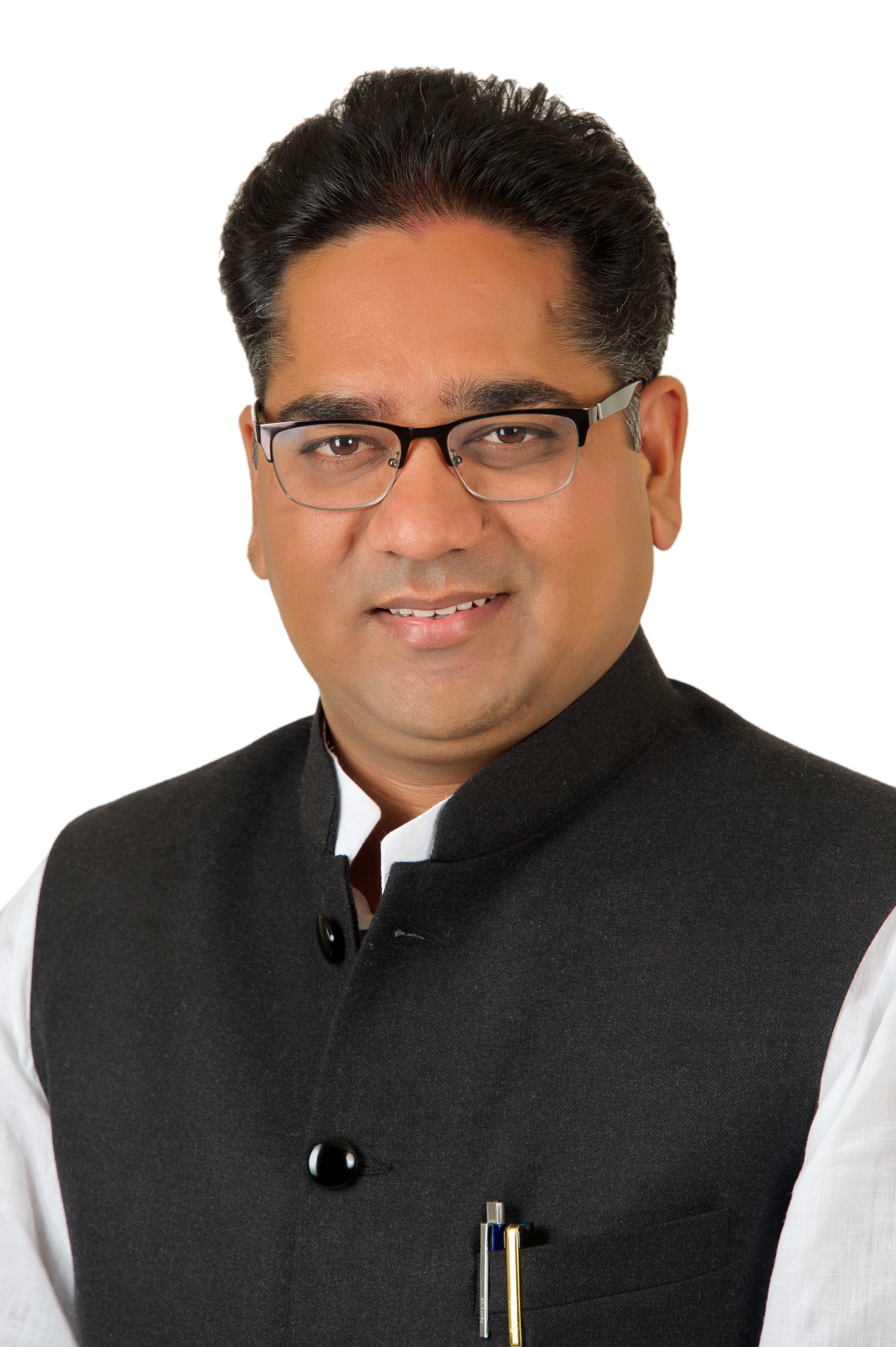

Cabinet Minister, Government of Rajasthan
- Incumbent
- Assumed office 30 December 2023
- Governor: Kalraj Mishra; Haribhau Bagade
- Chief Minister: Bhajan Lal Sharma
- Ministry and Departments: List: Water Resources; Water Resources (Planning)
- Preceded by: Bhanwar Singh Bhati

Member of the Rajasthan Legislative Assembly
- Incumbent
- Assumed office 2013
- Preceded by: Naseem Akhtar Insaf
- Constituency: Pushkar

Parliamentary Secretary Government of Rajasthan
- In office 18 January 2016 – 17 December 2018

Personal details
- Born: 6 May 1983 (age 42) Muhami, Ajmer District, Rajasthan, India
- Party: Bharatiya Janata Party
- Spouse: Rekha Rawat
- Children: 2
- Parent(s): Suraj Singh Rawat (father); Radha Devi Rawat (mother)
- Education: B.A.
- Alma mater: Maharshi Dayanand Saraswati University
- Occupation: Politician
- Profession: Agriculture
- Website: Official website

Suresh Singh Rawat (born 6 May 1983) is an Indian politician serving as the Cabinet Minister for Water Resources in the Government of Rajasthan. He has been a Member of the Rajasthan Legislative Assembly since 2013, representing the Pushkar constituency as a member of the Bharatiya Janata Party. He earlier served as a Parliamentary Secretary in the Rajasthan government from 2016 to 2018.

== Early life ==
Suresh Singh Rawat hails from Muhami in the Ajmer district of Rajasthan. He holds a Bachelor of Arts (Honours) degree from Maharshi Dayanand Saraswati University.

== Political career ==
Since March 2013, Rawat has been elected as a Member of the Rajasthan Legislative Assembly from the Pushkar constituency on a BJP ticket.

He served as a Parliamentary Secretary in the Government of Rajasthan from 2016 to 2018.

On 19 September 2022, Rawat brought a cow into the Rajasthan Legislative Assembly to draw attention to the outbreak of lumpy skin disease among cattle.

== Other works ==
Rawat appeared in the Indian television drama Pehredaar Piya Ki on Sony Entertainment Television, playing the role of a royal character.

== Electoral record ==
Election results
Year	Office	Constituency	Party	Votes (Suresh Singh Rawat)	%	Opponent	Opponent Party	Votes	%	Result	Ref
2023	MLA	Pushkar	Bharatiya Janata Party	84,619	44.63	Naseem Akhtar	Indian National Congress	70,750	37.31	Won	
2018	MLA	Pushkar	Bharatiya Janata Party	84,860	49.07	Nasim Akhtar Insaf	Indian National Congress	75,471	43.64	Won	
2013	MLA	Pushkar	Bharatiya Janata Party	90,013	59.82	Nasim Akhtar Insaf	Indian National Congress	48,723	32.38	Won	
