= Nasirabad, Ajmer =

Nasirabad
- Town
- Location in Rajasthan, India Nasirabad (India)
- Coordinates: 26.3°N 74.73°E
- Country: India
- State: Rajasthan
- District: Ajmer

Government
  - Type: Cantonment board
  - Member of Legislative Assembly, Nasirabad Constituency: Ramswaroop Lamba (Bharatiya Janta Party)
  - Member of Parliament, Ajmer Assembly: Bhagirath Choudhary (Bharatiya Janta Party)
  - Chief Minister, Rajasthan: Bhajan Lal Sharma (Bharatiya Janata Party)
  - Prime Minister, India: Narendra Modi (Bharatiya Janta Party)
- Elevation: 429 m (1,407 ft)

Population (2018)
  - Total: 56,980

Languages
  - Official: Hindi
- Time zone: UTC+5:30 (IST)
- PIN: 305601
- ISO 3166 code: RJ-IN
- Vehicle registration: RJ-01

Nasirabad is a cantonment town in Ajmer district in the Indian state of Rajasthan.

== History ==
Nasirabad is named after an English officer Sir David Ochterlony, who was honoured with the title Nasir-ud-Daula ("Defender of the State") by Mughal emperor Shah Alam II. The city is known for its cantonment, where many army soldiers and officers are posted. Also, this is the second station in Rajputana, after Beawer, where missionary work started during the 1860s plague epidemic.

== Demographics ==
As of the 2011 Indian census, Nasirabad had a population of 50,804. Males were 28581 of the population and females 22223. Nasirabad has an average literacy rate of 88.39%, higher than the national average of 74.04%: male literacy is 94.60%, and female literacy is 80.22%. In Nasirabad, 13.04% of the population is under 6 years of age. It is surrounded by the Aravalli Range.
In the 2011 Indian census, Nasirabad had a population of 50,804.

Schedule Castes (SC) constitutes 20.15% while Schedule Tribes (ST) were 0.54% of total population in Nasirabad

== Overview ==
The Indian Army has a large presence in Nasirabad; the Cantonment is home to one of the biggest firing ranges in India. The Army almost surrounds this town. Cantonment Board Nasirabad was established in the year 1818. It spreads over an area of 5601.0870 Acres which includes Notified civil area of 216.4557 Acres. Nasirabad Cantonment is administered by the Cantonment Board for municipal, revenue and land matters and overall development of the area.

== Economy ==
The city is surrounded with Ajmer, Beawer, and Kishangarh. The GAIL has made this an important place. The largest Gas Plant in Asia is situated in Dilwara, Nasirabad. With the development of this gas plant, there are many new opportunities. The transportation system is a vital player in this because of the transportation of Gas and Petroleum products.

The biggest manufacturing outfit in Nasirabad is Chandraprakash Laundry Soap, one of the biggest manufacturers of washing soap and detergent in Rajasthan.

Nasirabad is known for having prominent businessmen in supply chain markets.

The town is widely famous for its "Kachora", which is like a bigger variant of the spicy Indian kachori.

== Education ==
Government Vyaparik Higher Secondary School, Nasirabad is a pioneer school of the Board of Secondary Education, Rajasthan. Situated near the bus stop, more than a thousand students come here from nearby villages. The school has many achievements in academics, sports, culture, and extracurricular activities, and its alumni contribute in many fields, including medical, engineering, education, and the civil service. The school offers many courses at the higher secondary level in the sciences, commerce, the arts, and many more.

Kendriya Vidyalaya Sangathan has achieved the highest student pass ratio in the last decades for the 10th and 12th standard Board Examinations.

Other CBSE schools are Army Public School, St. John's Secondary School, St. Paul's Secondary School, Ravindra Public Secondary School, Government Schools, Girls Government School Kanya Path Shala, Lawrence & Mayo School and Sanskrit School in the Sadar Bazaar.

== Transportation ==
Nasirabad railway station serves the town. The town is also connected with Golden Quadrilateral of the Delhi–Mumbai route. The closest airport is Kishangarh Airport, Ajmer around 48 km from the city. There are two bus stations from which Rajasthan Public Transport Buses go throughout Rajasthan. Nasirabad has the largest number of trailer owners in India.

== Acharya Gyansagar ==
Jain Acharya 108 Gyansagar Maharaj did samadhi marana. His Samadhi Sthal is a pilgrimage for Jains. He is the guru of Jain saint Shri Vidhyasagar Ji Maharaj.
