= Lulwa Khas =

- Country: India
- State: Rajasthan
- District: Ajmer district
- Tehsil: Masuda
- Time zone: UTC+5:30 (IST)
- PIN: 305623
- ISO 3166 code: RJ-IN

Lulwa Khas is a village in the Masuda tehsil of Ajmer district, Rajasthan, India.
