= Third Sukhadia ministry =

Government of Rajasthan, India

- 8th Ministry of Rajasthan
- Date formed: 12 March 1962
- Date dissolved: 13 March 1967

People and organisations
- Governor: Gurmukh Nihal Singh (to April 1962); Sampurnanand
- Chief Minister: Mohan Lal Sukhadia
- Member party: Indian National Congress
- Status in legislature: Majority government
- Opposition party: Swatantra Party and others
- Opposition leader: Laxman Singh

History
- Election: 1962 election
- Legislature term: 3rd Rajasthan Assembly
- Predecessor: Second Sukhadia ministry
- Successor: President’s rule

The Third Sukhadia ministry was the council of ministers headed by Mohan Lal Sukhadia in Rajasthan after the 1962 Rajasthan Legislative Assembly election. It served during the third Rajasthan Legislative Assembly until President’s rule was imposed in March 1967.

== Background and tenure ==
The Indian National Congress held 89 of the 176 seats, with 87 seats held by the opposition and other parties. The Rajasthan Year Book and Who’s Who, 1963 records eight ministers and ten deputy ministers, with their portfolio allocations, as of March 1963. The list below therefore represents the March 1963 composition and not necessarily every later reshuffle.

== Council of ministers ==
=== Ministers (March 1963) ===
No.	Minister	Office/portfolio
1	Mohan Lal Sukhadia	Chief Minister; General Administration, Political, Appointments, Revenue, Panchayats, Community Development, Cooperation, large and mineral-based industries and mines, Planning, Housing and Statistics
2	Haribhau Upadhyaya	Education, Industries (excluding large and mineral-based industries), Civil Supplies and Devasthan
3	Mathura Das Mathur	Home, Law and Legal Remembrancer, Judicial, Legislative Assembly and Elections, and Publicity
4	Nathu Ram Mirdha	Agriculture, Animal Husbandry, Major Irrigation Projects, and State Industrial and Mineral Enterprises
5	Harish Chandra	Public Works, Transport, Power and Printing Presses
6	B. K. Kaul	Finance, Excise and Taxation
7	Bhikha Bhai	Irrigation excluding major projects, Forests, Labour, Ayurveda, Social Welfare, and Relief and Rehabilitation
8	Barkatullah Khan	Medical, Public Health, Local Self-Government and Town Planning

=== Deputy ministers (March 1963) ===
No.	Minister	Office/portfolio
1	Daulat Ram	Major Irrigation, Local Self-Government and Ayurveda
2	Kamla Beniwal	Planning and Development, Agriculture and Animal Husbandry, Famine Relief, and State Enterprises
3	Prabha Misra	Medical, Public Health, Social Welfare, and Law and Legal Remembrancer
4	Parasram Maderna	Power, General Administration, Relief and Rehabilitation, and Judicial
5	Bhawani Shankar Nandwana	Public Works, Labour, Panchayats, and Community Development
6	Ram Prasad Ladha	Revenue, Devasthan and Mines
7	Chandan Mal Baid	Industries and Finance
8	Dinesh Rai Dangi	Medium and Minor Irrigation, Khadi and Village Industries, and Small Savings
9	Niranjan Nath Acharya	Education, Forests, and Excise and Taxation
10	Bhim Singh	Home, Transport and Cooperation

== See also ==
- Government of Rajasthan
- Chief Minister of Rajasthan
- Rajasthan Legislative Assembly
