= Adarshnagar railway station =

Railway Station in Rajasthan, India

General information
- Location: National Highway 79, Adarsh Nagar, Ajmer, Rajasthan; India
- Coordinates: 26.4108°N 74.6534°E
- Elevation: 472 metres (1,549 ft)
- System: Indian Railways station
- Owner: Indian Railways
- Operator: Ajmer railway division
- Line: Jaipur–Ahmedabad line
- Platforms: 1
- Tracks: 3
- Connections: Auto stand

Construction
- Structure type: Standard (on ground station)
- Parking: No
- Cycle facilities: No

Other information
- Status: Functioning
- Station code: AHO
- Fare zone: North Western Railway
Location

Adarshnagar railway station is a small railway station in Ajmer district, Rajasthan India. Its code is AHO. It serves Ajmer city. The station consists of two platforms. The platforms are not well sheltered. It lacks many facilities including water and sanitation.

Adarshnagar located near Ajmer Junction railway station which is at an important railway junction on the broad-gauge Jaipur–Ahmedabad line. The rail lines on this route are without electric wires means only Diesel engines can be run on them. Electrification of the railway lines is under progress, starting with Ajmer–Jaipur line.

== Major trains ==
- Ajmer–Udaipur Passenger
