= B. N. Bhargava =

Indian politician (1930–1984)

Member of Parliament, Lok Sabha
- In office 1967–1977
- Preceded by: Mukat Behari Lal Bhargava
- Succeeded by: Shrikaran Sharda
- Constituency: Ajmer

Personal details
- Born: 7 July 1930 Rewari, Punjab, British India
- Died: 12 August 1984 (aged 54) Delhi, India
- Party: Indian National Congress
- Spouse: Sheela Vishesh Bhargava
- Children: 3

Bashweshwar Nath Bhargava (7 July 1930 – 12 August 1984) was an Indian politician. He was elected to the Lok Sabha, the lower house of the Parliament of India from Ajmer, Rajasthan as a member of the Indian National Congress. Bhargava died in Delhi on 12 August 1984, at the age of 54.
