= Prabha Thakur =

Indian politician (born 1951)

Member of Parliament, Rajya Sabha
- In office 10 April 2002—9 April 2008; 10 April 2008—9 April 2014
- Constituency: Rajasthan

Member of Parliament, Lok Sabha
- In office 1998—1999
- Preceded by: Rasa Singh Rawat
- Succeeded by: Rasa Singh Rawat
- Constituency: Ajmer Lok Sabha constituency

Personal details
- Born: 10 September 1951 (age 74) Bhuj, Kutch State, India
- Party: Indian National Congress
- Spouse: Rajen Thakur
- Children: 2 sons and 1 daughter including Rahul Singh
- Parent(s): Devi Singh Ji Barhath, R.A.S. (father)
- Education: BA; MA; PhD
- Alma mater: University of Udaipur (M.A., Ph.D.)
- Occupation: Poet; Writer; Social Worker; Politician
- As of 25 February, 2006

Prabha Thakur (born 10 September 1951) is an Indian politician, Congress leader, renowned Hindi poet and social worker. She was the Rajya Sabha MP for two consecutive terms from Rajasthan during 2004 to 2014 as well as Lok Sabha MP from Ajmer during 1998–99. She served as the President of the All India Mahila Congress. Thakur has also produced, directed and sung for some Hindi and Rajasthani films.

== Early life ==
Prabha Thakur was born on 10 September 1951 to father Devi Singh Barhath, an RAS officer and mother Sushila Devi, and belonged to Chota Udaipur (or Udaipur Khurd) village in Kishangarh, Ajmer.

== Career ==
Thakur was a member of 12th Lok Sabha from Ajmer constituency in Rajasthan from 1998 to 1999. In 2009, she was openly critical of the Left Front rule of the state of Bengal, saying that crimes against women have been growing in the previous 33 years of rule. In 2014, she was part of a group of women who supported an Aam Sabha for the 33% Women's Reservation Bill. She stated that the bill would help "empower Indian women socially, economically and politically."

Thakur has spoken out on other women's issues, calling for stricter anti-rape provisions in India. Thakur was also a supporter of laws against 'honour killings.' She has responded to comments about implementing dress codes to combat incidents of rape and has been quoted saying, "The question is not about the dress code, but the mentality of men. What the girls should wear should be the concern of the girl, her parents and her family only. I don't think there is a need for anyone else to say anything about how a girl should behave." Thakur believes instead, that as more women see rapists being dealt "justice," they will be more likely to file cases against assailants. She has previously spoken out about the amount of violent crime against women in Delhi.

Prabha has been a member of Maha Bodhi Society working for world peace and harmony through Buddhism. As a social worker and parliamentarian, she made special efforts in the field related to women and children.

Thakur donated a sum of 1 lakh rupees to CM Fund during the COVID-19 pandemic.

=== Positions held ===
Position	Organization	Term
Member of Parliament	Lok Sabha from Ajmer constituency	1998—1999
Member	Committee on Communications and its Sub-Committee 'C' - Ministry of Information and Broadcasting	1998—1999
Member	Committee on Official Language	1998—1999
Member	Committee on Members of Parliament Local Area Development Scheme	1998—1999
Member	Joint Committee on the Empowerment of Women and its Sub-Committee on Appraisal of Laws relating to Women - Criminal Laws	1998—1999
Member	Consultative Committee, Ministry of External Affairs	1998—1999
Member	Executive Committee, Congress Parliamentary Party	1998
Member	Rajasthan Mahila Congress	1998
Member of Parliament	Rajya Sabha from Rajasthan	2002—2008
Member of Parliament	Rajya Sabha from Rajasthan	2008—2014
Member	Executive Committee, Congress Parliamentary Party	1998
President	All India Mahila Congress	2008—2011
Co-chairman	Vichar Vibhag, All India Congress Committee	
Spokesperson	All India Congress Committee	
Member	DEPCO Committee of All India Congress Committee	
Member	Maha Bodhi Society	
Director	Hinglaj Hotels	

== Literature and films ==
Prabha Thakur is a well-known poet and her poems have been regularly published in literary magazines such as Saptahik Hindustan, Dharmayuga, and Kadambani as well as on All India Radio and Doordarshan. She takes part in various Hindi literary conferences and poets' symposiums. She has also produced, directed, written, composed and sung for some Hindi and Rajasthani films.

=== Films ===
Year	Title	Designation	Notes
	Gora Hat Jaa	Producer	short film
1997	Binani Hove To Aisi	Producer, Music, Lyrics	Rajasthani feature film
1997	Jai Mahalaxmi Maa	Director, Music, Lyrics, Screenplay, Dialogue, Story	Hindi feature film
2006	Kachchi Sadak	Producer, Music, Lyrics	Bollywood film

=== Playback singer ===
Year	Film	Song	Language
1984	Papi Pet Ka Sawal Hai	Musa Chatni Pisave	Hindi
1997	Binani Hove To Aisi	Pritam Mane Parno To	Rajasthani

=== Lyrics ===
Year	Film	Song	Language
1984	Papi Pet Ka Sawal Hai	Musa Chatni Pisave	Hindi
1984	Papi Pet Ka Sawal Hai	Khilona Ban Ke	Hindi
1974	Albeli (1974 film)	Tanik Tum Hamri Nazar Pehchaano	Hindi
1979	Atmaram	Chalte Chalte In Raaho Pe	Hindi
1977	Duniyadari	Pyar Karne Se Pehle Jaruri Hai Ye	Hindi
1983	Ghungroo	Tum Salamat Raho	Hindi
1983	Ghungroo	Tohfa Qubool Hai Hamen	Hindi
1997	Binani Hove To Aisi	Patang Udda Re Chhora	Hindi
2006	Kachchi Sadak	Kachchi Sadak (Title Track)	Hindi
2006	Kachchi Sadak	Khawaja Mere Khwaja	Hindi
2006	Kachchi Sadak	Humgama Hungama	Hindi
2006	Kachchi Sadak	Ek Tumse Baat	Hindi
2006	Kachchi Sadak	Ek Tum Se Baat Poochun	Hindi
2006	Kachchi Sadak	Ek Tum Se Baat Poochun II	Hindi

=== Books ===
- Bauraya Man (Poetry Collection) (1982)
- Aakhar Aakhar (Poetry Collection) (1990)
- Dehri Ka Man (Poetry Collection) ISBN 978-81-267-2532-8 (2013)

=== Edited ===
- Chetna Ke Swar (Collection of Poems) (1985)
