= Masuda Assembly constituency =

Legislative Assembly constituency in Rajasthan State, India

Coordinates: 26.09°N 74.51°E

Masuda
- Constituency No. 104 for the Rajasthan Legislative Assembly

Constituency details
- Country: India
- Region: North India
- State: Rajasthan
- District: Ajmer
- Lok Sabha constituency: Ajmer
- Established: 1972
- Total electors: 272,284
- Reservation: None

Member of Legislative Assembly
- 16th Rajasthan Legislative Assembly
- Incumbent Virendra Singh
- Party: Bharatiya Janata Party

Masuda Assembly constituency is one of the 200 Legislative Assembly constituencies of Rajasthan state in India.

It comprises Masuda and Bhinay tehsils of Ajmer district. As of 2023, its representative is Virendra Singh of the Bharatiya Janata Party.

== Members of the Legislative Assembly ==
Election	Name	Party
2003	Vishnu Modi	BJP
2008	Brahmdev	Independent
2013	Sushil Kanwar	Bharatiya Janata Party
2018	Rakesh Pareek	Indian National Congress
2023	Virendra Singh	Bharatiya Janata Party

== Election results ==
=== 2023 ===
Rajasthan Legislative Assembly Election, 2023: Masuda
Party	Candidate	Votes	%	±%
BJP	Virendra Singh	74,266	37.13	−7.56
INC	Rakesh	47,550	23.77	−22.75
BSP	Vajid	29,508	14.75	+12.49
Independent	Jasveer Singh	21,375	10.69	
RLP	Sachin Jain	18,554	9.28	+5.5
Independent	Sunil Kumar Jain	3,679	1.84	
NOTA	None of the above	1,640	0.82	−0.13
Majority		26,716	13.36	+11.53
Turnout		200,036	73.47	+1.58
BJP gain from INC		Swing		

=== 2018 ===
Rajasthan Legislative Assembly Election, 2018: Masuda
Party	Candidate	Votes	%	±%
INC	Rakesh Pareek	86,008	46.52	
BJP	Sushil Kanwar	82,634	44.69	
RLP	Hazi Kayum Khan	6,983	3.78	
BSP	Durga Lal	4,173	2.26	
NOTA	None of the above	1,752	0.95	
Majority		3,374	1.83	
Turnout		184,891	71.89	

== See also ==
- List of constituencies of the Rajasthan Legislative Assembly
- Ajmer district
