= Kiranipura =

Coordinates: 26°26′43″N 74°38′54″E

Kiranipura is a census town in Ajmer district in the Indian state of Rajasthan.

== Demographics ==
At the 2001 India census, Kiranipura had a population of 4941. Males constituted 51% of the population and females 49%. Kiranipura had an average literacy rate of 74%, higher than the national average of 59.5%: male literacy is 82%, and female literacy 66%. In Kiranipura, 12% of the population were under 6 years of age.
