= Rajasthan Samgrah Kalyan Sansthan =

Rajasthan Samgrah Kalyan Sansthan RSKS India
- Formation: 1992
- Type: Not for profit
- Purpose: women's empowerment and sustainable Livelihood
- Headquarters: India
- Location: India
- Region served: India,
- Official language: English and Hindi
- Leader: Dr. SN Sharma Deepak
- Budget: 50 Lakh per Annual
- Staff: 21
- Volunteers: 35
- Website: www.rsksindia.ngo

Rajasthan Samgrah Kalyan Sansthan (RSKS) is a grassroots Indian non profit organization (NGO) based in Ajmer District of Rajasthan state. RSKS India follows the UN Global Compact Principle and is certified by Guidestar India.

RSKS India was granted special consultative status in 2015 by the Economic and Social Council (ECOSOC) of the United Nations.

== History ==
Rajasthan Samgrah Kalyan Sansthan was founded on 2 December 1992 by youths interested in Social Work. RSKS India has been working to assist this marginalized community since 1992.

The RSKS India organization is situated in Aravali in the state of Rajasthan.

== Areas of focus ==
RSKS India focuses on campaigning and advocacy for:

- Women empowerment
- Sustainable livelihood
- Education
- Environment and sanitation
- Health
- Agriculture and livestock
- Disaster recovery and management
- Child rights and welfare

== Awards and certifications ==
- Sakhi Award for Women Empowerment honoured by CM Vasundhara Raje Rajasthan Gov. (dainik bhaskar & Hindustan zink)
- National Excellence Award honoured by Alma Foundation.
- Transparency non profit verified by the Guidestar India.
- RSKS India Has Been Granted Special Consultative Status (2015) By The Economic and Social Council (ECOSOC) of The United Nation.
- The White Ribbon Alliance for Safe Motherhood, India Partner Member
