= Anita Bhadel =

Indian politician

Anita Bhimsingh Bhadel
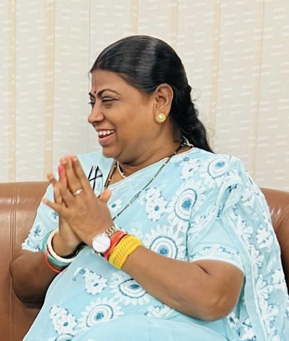
- Anita Bhadel

Minister of State (Independent Charge) for Ministry of Women and Child Development, Government of Rajasthan
- In office 2014–2018
- Succeeded by: Mamta Bhupesh

Member of the Rajasthan Legislative Assembly
- Incumbent
- Assumed office 2008
- Preceded by: New constituency
- Constituency: Ajmer South

Personal details
- Born: 23 December 1972 (age 53) Ajmer, Rajasthan
- Party: Bharatiya Janata Party
- Spouse: Bheem Singh Rariya (m. 1999)
- Education: Master of Arts & Master of Education
- Alma mater: Maharshi Dayanand Saraswati University
- Occupation: Politician
- Profession: Agriculturist

Anita Bhimsingh Bhadel (born 23 December 1972) is an Indian politician, social worker, and former Minister of State (Independent Charge) for Women and Child Development in the Government of Rajasthan. She is a member of the Rajasthan Legislative Assembly, representing the Ajmer South constituency and belongs to the Bharatiya Janata Party. She was honoured with the Nari Shakti Puraskar in 2017.

== Political career ==
- 2008 – 2013: First term as Member of Legislative Assembly from Ajmer South Assembly constituency
- 2013 – 2018: Second term as MLA from Ajmer South.
- 2014 – 2018: Served as Minister of State (Independent Charge) for Women and Child Development, Government of Rajasthan.
- 2018 – 2023: Third term as MLA from Ajmer South.
- 2023 – present: Fourth term as MLA from Ajmer South.

== Electoral record ==
Election results
Year	Office	Constituency	Candidate (Party)	Votes	%	Opponent (Party)	Opponent Votes	Opponent %	Result	Ref
2008	MLA	Ajmer South	Anita Bhadel (BJP)	44,902	50.55%	Dr. Rajkumar Jaipal (INC)	25,596	28.81%	Won	
2013	MLA	Ajmer South	Anita Bhadel (BJP)	70,509	57.28%	Hemant Bhati (INC)	47,351	38.47%	Won	TOI
2018	MLA	Ajmer South	Anita Bhadel (BJP)	69,064	50.16%	Hemant Bhati (INC)	63,364	46.02%	Won	TOI
2023	MLA	Ajmer South	Anita Bhadel (BJP)	71,319	50.22%	Dropdi Koli (INC)	66,873	47.09%	Won	TOI
