= Vishnu Kumar Modi =

Indian politician

Member of Parliament, Lok Sabha
- In office 1984-1989
- Preceded by: Bhagwan Dev Acharya
- Succeeded by: Rasa Singh Rawat
- Constituency: Ajmer, Rajasthan

Personal details
- Born: 24 March 1950 (age 76)
- Died: 21 March 2026
- Party: Indian National Congress
- Spouse: Neerja Modi

Vishnu Kumar Modi was an Indian politician and businessman. He was elected as a Member of Parliament to the 8th Lok Sabha from Ajmer, Rajasthan, serving from 1984 to 1989 as a representative of the Indian National Congress. He later served as a Member of the Rajasthan Legislative twice — from 1993 to 1998 representing Pushkar, Ajmer, during the 10th Assembly, and from 2003 to 2008 representing Masuda, Ajmer, in the 12th Assembly.

He was the President of the Rajasthan Youth Congress from 1981 to 1985. His father, Shri Kishan Modi, was also a Member of Parliament from Sikar, Rajasthan serving from 1971 to 1977 and his uncle, Mohan Lal Modi, served five terms in the Rajasthan Legislative Assembly representing Neem Ka Thana in Sikar district of Rajasthan.

In addition to his political career, Vishnu Kumar Modi is a prominent mining business owner engaged in the extraction and processing of minerals. His mining operations are based across multiple districts of Rajasthan, including Banswara, Ajmer, and Sikar contributing significantly to the region's mineral industry. He is also founder of Neerja Modi School, a private co-educational day boarding school serving kindergarten to 12th grade in Jaipur, Ajmer, Jodhpur and Udaipur. The school was built in 2001 by Shri Modi Shikshan Sansthan and has campuses spread across Rajasthan.
