= Second Vyas ministry =

Government of Rajasthan, India

- 5th Ministry of Rajasthan
- Date formed: 1 November 1952
- Date dissolved: 13 November 1954

People and organisations
- Rajpramukh: Sawai Man Singh II
- Chief Minister: Jai Narayan Vyas
- Member party: Indian National Congress
- Status in legislature: Majority government
- Opposition party: Ram Rajya Parishad and others
- Opposition leader: Jaswant Singh

History
- Election: 1952 election
- Legislature term: 1st Rajasthan Assembly
- Predecessor: Paliwal ministry
- Successor: First Sukhadia ministry

The Second Vyas ministry was the council of ministers headed by Jai Narayan Vyas in Rajasthan. It took office on 1 November 1952, succeeding the Paliwal ministry, and continued until Mohan Lal Sukhadia became chief minister on 13 November 1954.

== Background and tenure ==
It governed during the first Rajasthan Legislative Assembly. The Indian National Congress held 82 of the 160 seats, and Jaswant Singh served as leader of the opposition.

A complete, reliably digitised portfolio allocation for this ministry has not yet been located; names and portfolios should be added only from the Rajasthan Gazette or an equivalent contemporary official source.

== See also ==
- Government of Rajasthan
- Chief Minister of Rajasthan
- Rajasthan Legislative Assembly
