= Second Sukhadia ministry =

Government of Rajasthan, India

- 7th Ministry of Rajasthan
- Date formed: 11 April 1957
- Date dissolved: 12 March 1962

People and organisations
- Governor: Gurmukh Nihal Singh
- Chief Minister: Mohan Lal Sukhadia
- Member party: Indian National Congress
- Status in legislature: Majority government
- Opposition party: Praja Progressive Party and others

History
- Election: 1957 election
- Legislature term: 2nd Rajasthan Assembly
- Predecessor: First Sukhadia ministry
- Successor: Third Sukhadia ministry

The Second Sukhadia ministry was the council of ministers headed by Mohan Lal Sukhadia in Rajasthan after the 1957 Rajasthan Legislative Assembly election. It served during the second Rajasthan Legislative Assembly.

== Background and tenure ==
The Indian National Congress held 119 of the 176 seats in the Assembly. The Assembly archive records a no-confidence motion in February 1958; the motion was not permitted, with 23 votes in favour and 123 against.

A complete, reliably digitised portfolio allocation for this ministry has not yet been located.

== See also ==
- Government of Rajasthan
- Chief Minister of Rajasthan
- Rajasthan Legislative Assembly
