= Rasa Singh Rawat =

Indian politician (1941–2021)

Member of Parliament for Ajmer
- In office 1999 - 2009
- Preceded by: Prabha Thakur
- Succeeded by: Sachin Pilot

Member of Parliament for Ajmer
- In office 1989 - 1998
- Preceded by: Vishnu Kumar Modi
- Succeeded by: Prabha Thakur

Personal details
- Born: 1 October 1941 Rajsamand, Rajasthan, India
- Died: 10 May 2021 (aged 79) Ajmer, Rajasthan, India
- Party: BJP
- Spouse: Yashoda Devi Rawat
- Children: 3 sons and 1 daughter
- As of 14 September, 2006

Rasa Singh Rawat (1 October 1941 – 10 May 2021) was an Indian politician.

== Biography ==
He has been a member of the 9th, 10th, 11th, 13th and the 14th Lok Sabha of India, representing the Ajmer constituency in the state of Rajasthan. He was a member of the Bharatiya Janata Party (BJP). Rawat died on 10 May 2021 of COVID-19 in Ajmer during the COVID-19 pandemic in India.
