= Nasirabad railway station =

Railway station in Rajasthan, India

Nasirabad

General information
- Location: Nasirabad, Ajmer district, Rajasthan; India
- Coordinates: 26.295067°N 74.717162°E
- Elevation: 428 metres (1,404 ft)
- System: Indian Railways station
- Owner: Indian Railways
- Operator: North Western Railway
- Line: Ajmer–Ratlam line
- Platforms: 2
- Tracks: 2

Construction
- Structure type: Standard (on ground station)
- Parking: Yes

Other information
- Status: Functioning
- Station code: NSD
- Zone(s): North Western Railway
- Division(s): Ajmer
Location
- Location within India Location within Rajasthan

Nasirabad railway station is a railway station in Ajmer district, Rajasthan. Its code is NSD. It serves Nasirabad town. The station consists of 2 platforms. Passenger, Express, and Superfast trains halt here.
