= Pushkar Terminus =

Railway station in Rajasthan, India

General information
- Location: New Railway Station Road, Pushkar, Ajmer, Rajasthan; India
- Coordinates: 26°29′27″N 74°32′16″E
- Elevation: 466 metres (1,529 ft)
- System: Indian Railways station
- Owner: Indian Railways
- Operator: North Western Railway zone
- Line: Ajmer–Pushkar line
- Tracks: 5 ft 6 in (1,676 mm) broad gauge

Construction
- Structure type: Standard on ground
- Parking: Yes
- Cycle facilities: No

Other information
- Status: Functioning
- Station code: PUHT
- Division(s): Ajmer

History
- Opened: 2012; 14 years ago
Location
- Location within Rajasthan Location within India

Pushkar Terminus (also referred to as Pushkar railway station) is located in Ajmer district in the Indian state of Rajasthan. It serves the pilgrimage site at Pushkar.

== The railway station ==
Pushkar railway station is at an elevation of 466 metres (1,529 ft) and was assigned the code – PUHT.

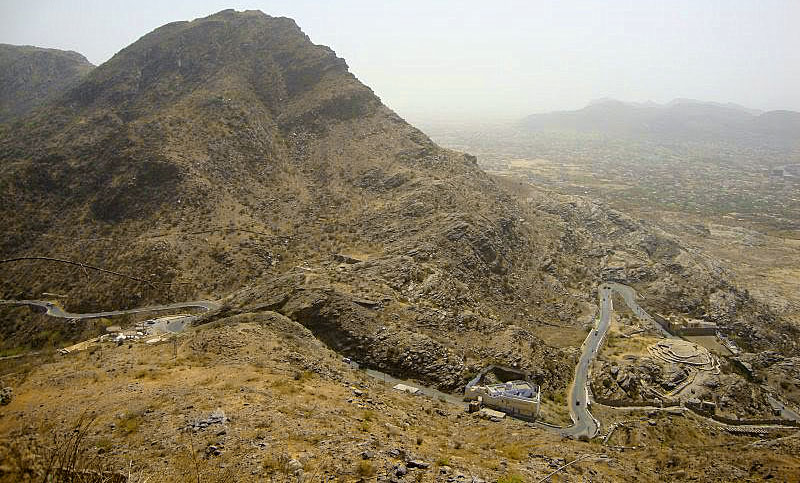
A long shot of Pushkar ghati, through which the train line runs

== History ==
The 25.7 km Ajmer–Pushkar line (new line from Madar to Pushkar) was completed in 2011 and trains introduced in 2012. The track was approved in 2002 but construction was delayed because of clearances for the line passing through desert and hilly region.

Preceding station	Indian Railways	Following station
Budha Pushkar Halt towards ?	North Western Railway zone Ajmer–Pushkar link	Terminus
