= First Sukhadia ministry =

Government of Rajasthan, India

- 6th Ministry of Rajasthan
- Date formed: 13 November 1954
- Date dissolved: 11 April 1957

People and organisations
- Head of state: Sawai Man Singh II (Rajpramukh, to 1956); Gurmukh Nihal Singh (Governor)
- Chief Minister: Mohan Lal Sukhadia
- Member party: Indian National Congress
- Status in legislature: Majority government
- Opposition party: Ram Rajya Parishad and others
- Opposition leader: Jaswant Singh

History
- Election: 1952 election
- Legislature term: 1st Rajasthan Assembly
- Predecessor: Second Vyas ministry
- Successor: Second Sukhadia ministry

The First Sukhadia ministry was the council of ministers headed by Mohan Lal Sukhadia in Rajasthan. It was formed on 13 November 1954 during the first Rajasthan Legislative Assembly and continued until Sukhadia formed a new ministry following the 1957 election.

== Background and tenure ==
The Indian National Congress held 82 of the Assembly’s 160 seats. During the ministry, the office of Rajpramukh was replaced by that of Governor on 1 November 1956; Gurmukh Nihal Singh succeeded Sawai Man Singh II as head of state.

A complete, reliably digitised portfolio allocation for this ministry has not yet been located.

== See also ==
- Government of Rajasthan
- Chief Minister of Rajasthan
- Rajasthan Legislative Assembly
