= Shrikaran Sharda =

Indian politician (born 1919)

Member of Parliament, Lok Sabha
- In office 1977–1980
- Preceded by: B. N. Bhargava
- Succeeded by: Bhagwan Dev Acharya
- Constituency: Ajmer

Personal details
- Born: 14 June 1919 Baroda, Gujarat
- Party: Janata Party
- Other political affiliations: Bharatiya Lok Dal; Indian National Congress
- Education: B.A., LL.B.

Shrikaran Sharda (born 14 June 1919, date of death unknown) was an Indian politician and member of the 6th Lok Sabha, elected by Ajmer in the 1977 Indian general election as a Janata Party candidate, after previous association with the Indian National Congress and Bharatiya Jana Sangh parties.
