= Ajmer South Assembly constituency =

Legislative Assembly constituency in Rajasthan State, India

Coordinates: 26.44°N 74.64°E

Ajmer South
- Constituency No. 101 for the Rajasthan Legislative Assembly

Constituency details
- Country: India
- Region: North India
- State: Rajasthan
- District: Ajmer
- Lok Sabha constituency: Ajmer
- Established: 2008
- Total electors: 210,287
- Reservation: SC

Member of Legislative Assembly
- 16th Rajasthan Legislative Assembly
- Incumbent Anita Bhadel
- Party: Bharatiya Janata Party

Ajmer South Assembly constituency is one of the 200 Legislative Assembly constituencies of Rajasthan state in India.

It is part of Ajmer district and is reserved for candidates belonging to the Scheduled Castes. As of 2023, it is represented by Anita Bhadel of the Bharatiya Janata Party.

== Members of the Legislative Assembly ==
Year	Name	Party
2008	Anita Bhadel	Bharatiya Janata Party
2013	Anita Bhadel	Bharatiya Janata Party
2018	Anita Bhadel	Bharatiya Janata Party
2023	Anita Bhadel	Bharatiya Janata Party

== Election results ==
=== 2023 ===
Rajasthan Legislative Assembly Election, 2023: Ajmer South
Party	Candidate	Votes	%	±%
BJP	Anita Bhadel	71,319	50.22	+0.06
INC	Dr. Dropdi Koli	66,873	47.09	+1.07
NOTA	None of the above	1,674	1.18	−0.11
Majority		4,446	3.13	−1.01
Turnout		142,004	67.53	−0.54
BJP hold		Swing		

=== 2018 ===
Rajasthan Legislative Assembly Election, 2018: Ajmer South
Party	Candidate	Votes	%	±%
BJP	Anita Bhadel	69,064	50.16	
INC	Hemant Bhati	63,364	46.02	
NOTA	None of the above	1,779	1.29	
Majority		5,700	4.14	
Turnout		137,683	68.07	
BJP hold		Swing		

== See also ==
- List of constituencies of the Rajasthan Legislative Assembly
- Ajmer district
