= Bhagwan Dev Acharya =

Indian politician

Member of Parliament, Lok Sabha
- In office 1980–1984
- Preceded by: Shrikaran Sharda
- Succeeded by: Vishnu Kumar Modi
- Constituency: Ajmer, Rajasthan.

Personal details
- Born: 23 February 1935
- Party: Indian National Congress
- Spouse: Padma

Bhagwan Dev Acharya is an Indian politician. He was elected to the Lok Sabha, the lower house of the Parliament of India from Ajmer, Rajasthan as a member of the Indian National Congress.
