= Magra, Ajmer =

Magra Magra
- Village
- Location in Rajasthan, India Magra (India)
- Coordinates: 26.618804°N 74.7553653°E
- Country: India
- State: Rajasthan
- District: Ajmer

Languages
  - Official: Hindi
- Time zone: UTC+5:30 (IST)
- PIN: 305811

Magra is a village in Ajmer District, Rajasthan, India.
