= Budha Pushkar Halt railway station =

Railway Station in Rajasthan, India

General information
- Location: Pushkar, Rajasthan; India
- Coordinates: 26.5237358°N 74.5948094°E
- Elevation: 504 metres (1,654 ft)
- System: Indian Railways station
- Owner: Indian Railways
- Operator: North Western Railway
- Platforms: 2
- Tracks: 4 (single diesel 5 ft 6 in (1,676 mm) broad gauge)
- Connections: Auto stand

Construction
- Structure type: Standard (on ground station)
- Parking: No
- Cycle facilities: No

Other information
- Status: Functioning
- Station code: BPKH
- Zone(s): North Western Railway
- Division(s): Ajmer
Location

Budha Pushkar Halt railway station is a small railway station in Ajmer district, Rajasthan, India. Its code is BPKH. It serves Pushkar city. The station consists of two platforms. The platforms are not well sheltered. It lacks many facilities including water and sanitation.

== Major trains ==
Some of the important trains that run from Budha Pushkar Halt are:

- Ajmer–Pushkar Passenger
- Pushkar–Ajmer Passenger
