= Khonda =

Khonda Khonda
- Village
- Location in Rajasthan, India Khonda (India)
- Coordinates: 26.5139088°N 74.799°E
- Country: India
- State: Rajasthan
- District: Ajmer

Languages
  - Official: Hindi
- Time zone: UTC+5:30 (IST)
- PIN: 305802

Khonda is a village in Ajmer District, Rajasthan, India.
