= Jago Party =

- Leader: Deepak Mittal
- Founded: August 2007; 19 years ago
- ECI status: State party
- Seats in Rajya Sabha: 0 / 245
- Seats in Lok Sabha: 0 / 543
- Seats in Rajasthan Legislative Assembly: 0 / 200

Website
- www.jagoparty.org

Jago Party is an Indian political party. It was founded in August 2007 by a group of non-political Indians and was registered with the Election Commission of India in January 2008.

== Vision ==
- To make a society based on individual freedom to pursue one's happiness, so long as one does not take away freedom of others by force or fraud

- To make India a free market economy and protect its freedom-based institutions such as democracy and secularism

- To restrict role of the government only to maintenance of individual's freedom and management of public property

- To eliminate all discrimination exercised by government or individuals on the basis of religion, caste, sex, place of birth, income, ethnicity etc.

- To strive for one world government based on democracy, secularism, and free market economy with one global policing and justice system

== Manifesto ==
Elimination of all reservations and provision of free education to all
Death sentence for big-scale corruption and rape; court judgment within three months
Removal of all subsidies; direct transfer of cash worth Rs 800 per month to all voters
Maximum privatization including that of power and railways
No income tax up to Rs. 400,000 per annum; reduction in number and rates of taxes

=== Membership ===
The Party has two categories of membership:

Primary membership:
Any person who is a citizen of India, has attained the age of 18, accepts the Constitution and ideology of the party, and is not a member of any other political organization can become a primary member of Jago Party. There is no membership fee on enrollment as a primary member.

Active membership:
Every active member must be aged 18 or over, pay the annual membership fee of Rs.100 and actively participate in the party's activities.

Local organization of Jago Party:

a. A state/UT general council for each state/UT.

b. A state/UT executive committee.

c. A district general council for each district.

d. A district executive committee for each district.

The primary unit of the party is the district executive committee.

== 2008 Rajasthan Assembly elections ==
Jago Party contested Assembly election in Rajasthan in 2008 in 26 seats, although no candidate won the election. Jago Party was ahead of all the smaller parties in most of the 26 constituencies it contested, except Bharatiya Janata Party (BJP), Indian National Congress and SP. Jago Party was ahead of Bahujan Samaj Party (BSP) in two constituencies and was fourth there among all political parties.

Jago Party contested the elections of Rajasthan Vidhan Sabha in 2013 and Lok Sabha in 2014.

== 2025 Party Delisted ==
On August 9, the ECI issued an order to delist thirteen (13) Registered Unrecognized Political Parties in the state for railing to meet regulatory requirements. The Jago party was one of the thirteen.
