= Prabha Misra =

Indian politician

Prabha Mishra
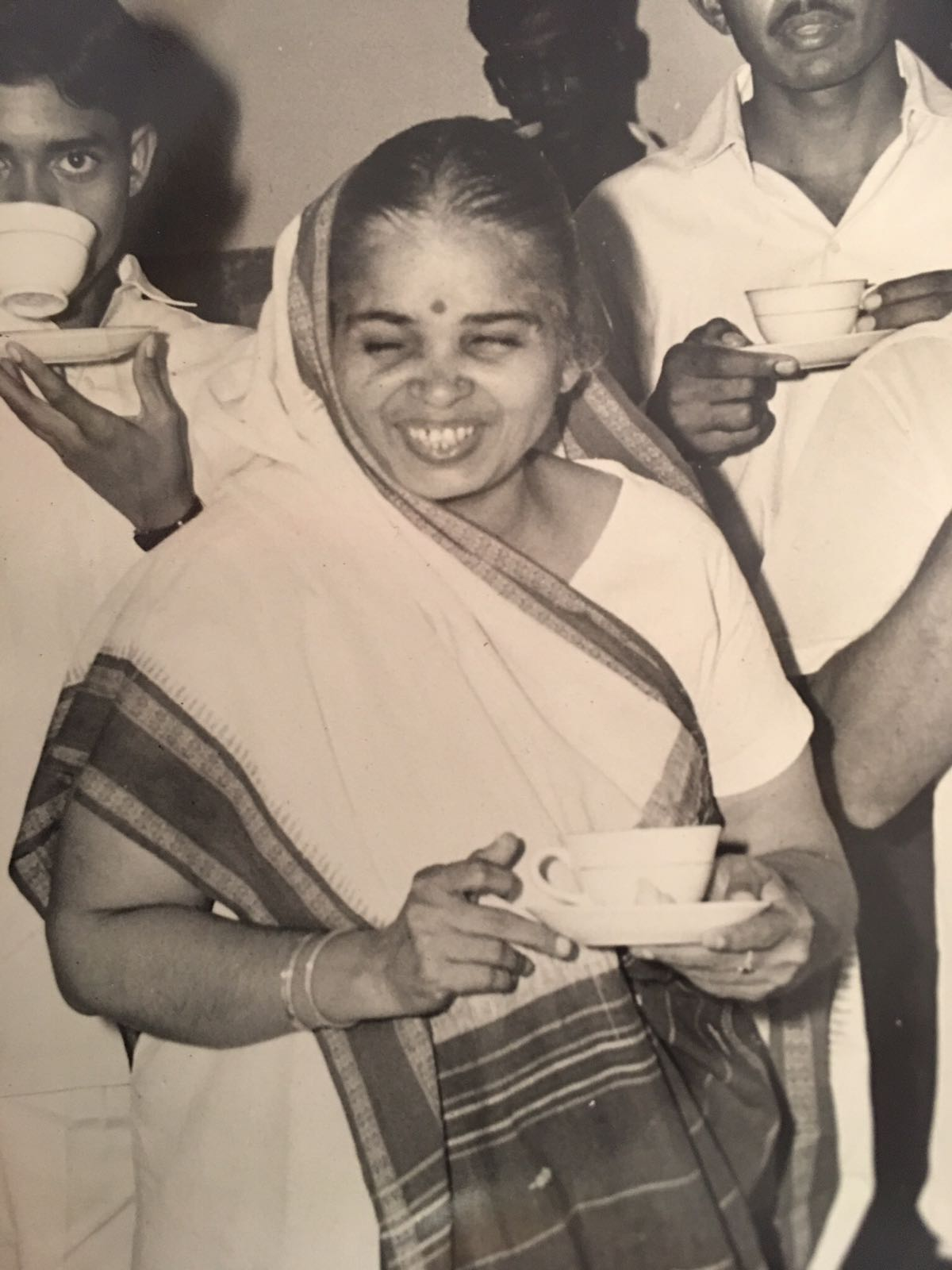

Member of the Rajasthan Legislative Assembly
- In office 1957–1977
- Constituency: Pushkar

Personal details
- Party: Indian National Congress
- Spouse: Sukh Deo Prasad Mishra
- Education: Agra University, Government College Ajmer

Prabha Mishra was an Indian politician and a member of the Indian National Congress. She served as a member of the Rajasthan Legislative Assembly from 1957 to 1977, representing the Pushkar Assembly constituency in Rajasthan. During her political career, she held various ministerial positions in the state cabinet, advocating for the welfare of women and marginalized communities.

== Early life and education ==
Prabha Mishra was born in Shahbad, Hardoi, into a Tripathi family. She was married at the age of 13 to Sukh Deo Prasad Mishra, the son of Pandit Hazari Lal Mishra, a railway clerk working in Ajmer. Despite being married at a young age, Prabha Mishra pursued her education passionately. With the support of her father-in-law, she completed her studies, eventually earning double M.A. degrees from Agra University and an LLB from Government College Ajmer.

== Family Life ==
Prabha Mishra and Sukh Deo Prasad Mishra had five children. Her commitment to education and intellectual growth was evident throughout her life, as she continued her studies even after marriage, a rare achievement for women of her time.

== Political career ==
She contested Assembly election from Pushkar Assembly constituency which belongs to the State Rajasthan and was a member of assembly (MLA) from 1957 to 1977. She won the assembly elections in 1957, 1962, 1967 and 1972 elections. She represented Indian National Congress. In her lifetime, she held various cabinet posts.
