= Mukat Behari Lal Bhargava =

Indian politician and freedom fighter

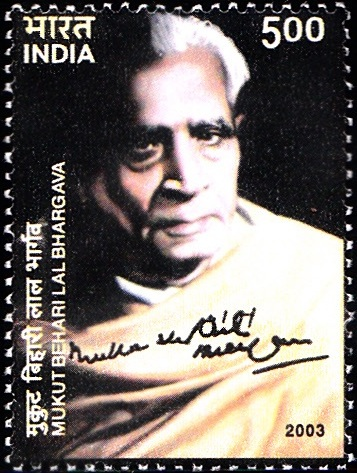
Mukat Behari Lal Bhargava on a 2003 stamp of India

Mukat Behari Lal Bhargava (30 June 1903 – 18 December 1980) was an Indian politician, Freedom fighter, a member of the Indian National Congress political party, and a member of the Lok Sabha from 1951 to 1967. He was born in 1903 in Bhilwara district in the State of Rajasthan.

In 1928, Bhargava joined the Indian National Congress and the All India States Peoples Conference. He fought for the Indian independence and was jailed in the Quit India movement. He lost his eyesight when in jail. He was a member of the Constituent Assembly of India in 1949. He was elected to the 1st Lok Sabha in 1951 from Ajmer South constituency in Ajmer state. He was elected to the 2nd and 3rd Lok Sabha from Ajmer constituency in Rajasthan state in 1957 and 1962 respectively. He was a well known lawyer of his times. He had an amazing memory.

Bhargava was also the father of Sharda Bhargava, who rose to the position of vice chairperson of the Rajya Sabha.
