= Maharshi Dayanand Saraswati University =

University in Ajmer, Rajasthan

Coordinates: 26°30′18″N 74°40′52″E

- Type: Public
- Established: 1987 (39 years ago) and Privately managed by S. Parmar
- Affiliations: UGC
- Chancellor: Governor of Rajasthan
- Vice-Chancellor: Anil Shukla
- Location: Ajmer, Rajasthan, India
- Campus: Urban
- Website: mdsuajmer.ac.in

Maharshi Dayanand Saraswati University is a university in Ajmer, Rajasthan, India. It opened in 1987 and is named after the philosopher Maharshi Dayananda Saraswati.

== History ==
The university was established August 1, 1987 as the University of Ajmer. The name was changed in 1993. Jurisdiction of the university extends to the entire state of Rajasthan.

Since inception the university has conducted the examination of nearly 1,500,000 students in colleges throughout the state. In 1990, the history, political science, zoology, botany and mathematics departments were founded; in 1991 courses in environmental technology, microbiology and laboratory technology and instrumentation were started. In 1993, after transferring to a new campus, the courses of food and nutrition, applied chemistry, management studies and computer applications were created, offering M. Sc., MBA, postgraduate (PG) diploma and Ph.D. programmes.

The university started a PG programme in environmental science in 1998 and PG programmes in botany, zoology, business economics, commerce, population studies, history, political science and computer science in 2000. The founder vice chancellor of the university was Prof Rambali Upadhyaya, a renowned management teacher who was previously teaching management students at the University of Rajasthan.

== Departments ==
There are 24 teaching departments: history, political science and public administration, economics, botany, zoology, pure and applied chemistry, environmental studies, remote sensing and geoInformatics, foods and nutrition, microbiology, computer applications, population studies, commerce and management studies, law, education, physical education, yoga and human consciousness, entrepreneurship & small business management, strategic studies and information sciences.

== Location ==
The university's campus is near the village of Ghooghra, seven kilometers from the city of Ajmer.

== Affiliation ==
There are 89 government-run and private colleges affiliated with the university. These colleges are spread throughout Rajasthan. The university conducted examinations of 135,000 students for courses during the 2007-08 session.

== Accreditation ==
The National Accreditation and Assessment Council has accredited Maharshi Dayanand Saraswati University a B++ rating.

== Students Union ==
Every year student union elections takes place to elect a president, vice president and general secretary.
