= Rakesh Pareek =

Indian politician

Member of the Rajasthan Legislative Assembly
- In office 2018–2023
- Constituency: Masuda

Personal details
- Born: 6 June 1959 (age 66) Sanpla, Ajmer
- Occupation: Politician

Rakesh Pareek (born 6 June 1959) is an Indian politician from the Indian National Congress and was a member of the Rajasthan Legislative Assembly representing Masuda Vidhan Sabha constituency of Rajasthan.
