= Godiyawas =

Godiyawas Godiawas
- Village
- Location in Rajasthan, India Godiyawas (India)
- Coordinates: 27.3442°N 75.1577°E
- Country: India
- State: Rajasthan
- District: Sikar
- Founded by: Gaj Singh Shekhawat

Area
  - Total: 4.528 km^{2} (1.748 sq mi)

Population (2011)
  - Total: 831
  - Density: 184/km^{2} (475/sq mi)

Languages
  - Official: Hindi
- Time zone: UTC+5:30 (IST)
- PIN: 332702
- Vehicle registration: RJ 23

Godiyawas is a village in Sikar District, Rajasthan, India. Godiyawas village was founded by Shri Gaj Singh Shekhawat. Shri Gaj Singh Shekhawat was the son of Thakur Shyam Singh Shekhawat(Khoor King). Khoor King Shyam Singh ji granted Godiyawas village to the Kunwar Gaj Singh Shekhawat.

According to Census 2011 information the location code or village code of Godiyawas village is 081717. Godiyawas village is located in Danta Ramgarh tehsil of Sikar district in Rajasthan, India. It is situated 10 km away from sub-district headquarter Danta Ramgarh (tehsildar office) and 44 km away from district headquarter Sikar. As per 2009 stats, Suliyawas is the gram panchayat of Godiyawas village.

The total geographical area of village is 452.82 hectares. Godiyawas has a total population of 831 peoples, out of which male population is 412 while female population is 419. Literacy rate of Godiyawas village is 59.21% out of which 72.33% males and 46.30% females are literate. There are about 145 houses in Godiyawas village. Pincode of Godiyawas village locality is 332702.

When it comes to administration, Godiyawas village is administrated by a sarpanch who is elected representative of the village by the local elections. As per 2019 stats, Godiyawas village comes under Danta ramgarh assembly constituency & Sikar parliamentary constituency. Ramgarh is nearest town to Godiyawas for all major economic activities, which is approximately 10 km away.
