= Ghooghra =

Ghooghra Ghooghra
- Village
- Location in Rajasthan, India Ghooghra (India)
- Coordinates: 26.4851°N 74.5515°E
- Country: India
- State: Rajasthan
- District: Ajmer

Languages
  - Official: Hindi
- Time zone: UTC+5:30 (IST)
- PIN: 305023

Ghooghra is a village in Ajmer District, Rajasthan, India.
