= Madar Junction =

Train station in Rajasthan, India

Madar Junction railway station

General information
- Location: Madarpura, Ajmer, Rajasthan; India
- Coordinates: 26.4628°N 74.6851°E
- Elevation: 490 metres (1,610 ft)
- System: Indian Railways
- Owner: Indian Railways
- Operator: North Western Railway Zone
- Platforms: 3
- Tracks: 4
- Connections: Auto stand

Construction
- Structure type: Standard (on ground station)
- Parking: Yes
- Cycle facilities: Yes

Other information
- Status: Functioning
- Station code: MDJN
- Zone(s): North Western Railway Zone
- Division(s): Ajmer

History
- Former names: Madar Junction Ajmer Rajasthan
Location

Madar Junction railway station is a railway station on Ahmedabad–Jaipur line under Ajmer railway division in Ajmer District, Rajasthan. It is located at Madarpura in Naka Madar area of Ajmer City. The station consists of three platforms, and a Coach Care Complex.
