= Nasirabad Assembly constituency =

Legislative Assembly constituency in Rajasthan State, India

Coordinates: 26.3°N 74.73°E

Nasirabad
- Constituency No. 102 for the Rajasthan Legislative Assembly

Constituency details
- Country: India
- Region: North India
- State: Rajasthan
- District: Ajmer
- Lok Sabha constituency: Ajmer
- Established: 1972
- Total electors: 233,324
- Reservation: None

Member of Legislative Assembly
- 16th Rajasthan Legislative Assembly
- Incumbent Ramswaroop Lamba
- Party: Bharatiya Janata Party

Nasirabad Assembly constituency is one of the 200 Legislative Assembly constituencies of Rajasthan state in India.

It comprises Nasirabad and Pisangan tehsils, both in Ajmer district. As of 2023, its representative is Ramswaroop Lamba of the Bharatiya Janata Party.

== Members of the Legislative Assembly ==
Election	Name	Party
1998	Govind Singh	Indian National Congress
2003	Govind Singh	Indian National Congress
2008	Mahendra Singh	Indian National Congress
2013	Sanwar Lal	Bharatiya Janata Party
2018	Ramswaroop Lamba	Bharatiya Janata Party

== Election results ==
=== 2023 ===
2023 Rajasthan Legislative Assembly election: Nasirabad
Party	Candidate	Votes	%	±%
BJP	Ramswaroop Lamba	79,364	43.77	−8.93
INC	Shivprakash Gurjar	78,229	43.14	+0.27
Rashtriya Jan Shourya Party	Shivraj Singh	15,975	8.81	
NOTA	None of the above	1,392	0.77	−0.12
Majority		1,135	0.63	−9.2
Turnout		181,330	77.72	−1.25
BJP hold		Swing		

=== 2018 ===
Rajasthan Legislative Assembly Election, 2018: Nasirabad
Party	Candidate	Votes	%	±%
BJP	Ramswaroop Lamba	89,409	52.7	
INC	Ramnarain	72,725	42.87	
NOTA	None of the above	1,513	0.89	
Majority		16,684	9.83	
Turnout		169,652	78.97	

== See also ==
- List of constituencies of the Rajasthan Legislative Assembly
- Ajmer district
