= Ajmer Junction railway station =

Railway Station in Rajasthan, India

AJMER JUNCTION

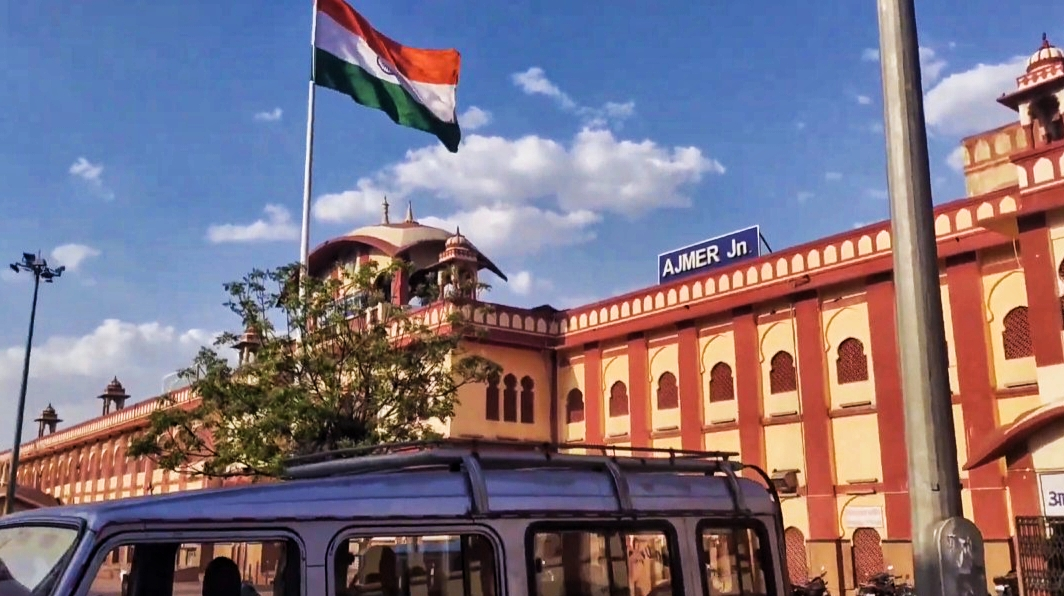
- Ajmer Junction Railway Station

General information
- Location: Jaipur Road, Patel Nagar, Topdara, Ajmer, Ajmer district, Rajasthan; India
- Coordinates: 26°27′24″N 74°38′15″E
- Elevation: 464 metres (1,522 ft)
- System: Express train and Passenger train station
- Owner: Indian Railways
- Operator: North Western Railway zone
- Lines: New Delhi–Ahmedabad main line, Jaipur–Ahmedabad line, Ajmer–Chittaurgarh line
- Platforms: 6
- Tracks: 10

Construction
- Structure type: Standard on ground
- Parking: Yes
- Cycle facilities: No

Other information
- Status: Functioning
- Station code: AII
- Zone(s): North Western Railway
- Division(s): Ajmer
- Fare zone: Indian Railways
Location
- Location within Rajasthan Location within India
- Interactive map of Ajmer Junction

Ajmer Junction railway station (station code: AII) is located in Ajmer district in the Indian state of Rajasthan.

== History ==
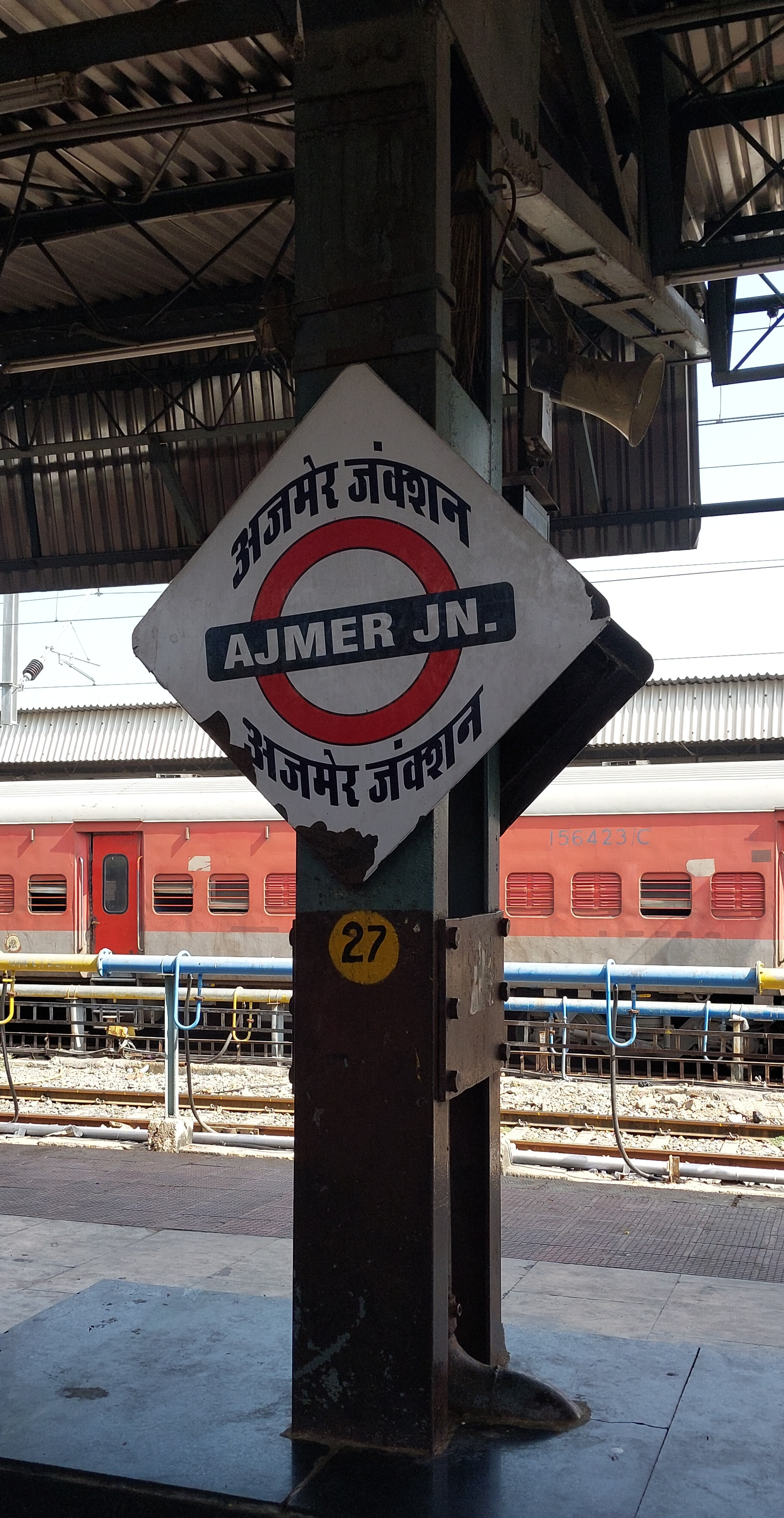
Ajmer Junction railway station board

Initially it was built as a metre-gauge (MG) station with lines from Chittaurgarh Junction railway station, Ahmedabad Junction railway station, Phulera Junction railway station. In the 1990s, the Delhi–Jaipur line and Jaipur–Ahmedabad line were converted to broad gauge (BG). Then the station had a parallel BG – MG lines coming from north from Phulera Junction railway station, and after the station the MG line to Chittaurgarh crossed over to the Southeast side while the BG continued Southwest to Beawar railway station and Ahmedabad Junction railway station. Finally, somewhere in 2007, the line going toward Ratlam Junction railway station to Chittaurgarh was converted to BG.

== Location and layout ==
Ajmer Junction (station code: AII) is an important railway junction having six platforms and situated in the heart of the city. It is at an elevation of 464 metres (1,522 ft) and was assigned the code – AII. Other Suburban Station of Ajmer are Madar Junction (MDJN), Daurai (DOZ), and Adarsh Nagar (AHO). It has a railway complex, which includes a major workshop.

== Branchings ==
It has four branchings of broad-gauge lines to Beawar in south-west, Chittorgarh Junction in South, Phulera Junction in North and Pushkar Terminus in West.
