= Pushkar Assembly constituency =

Legislative Assembly constituency in Rajasthan State, India

Coordinates: 26.49°N 74.54°E

Pushkar
- Constituency No. 99 for the Rajasthan Legislative Assembly

Constituency details
- Country: India
- Region: North India
- State: Rajasthan
- District: Ajmer
- Lok Sabha constituency: Ajmer
- Established: 1972
- Total electors: 251,989
- Reservation: None

Member of Legislative Assembly
- 16th Rajasthan Legislative Assembly
- Incumbent Suresh Singh Rawat
- Party: Bharatiya Janata Party

Pushkar Assembly constituency is one of the 200 Legislative Assembly constituencies of Rajasthan state in India.

It is part of Ajmer district.

== Members of the Legislative Assembly ==
Year	Member	Party
1957	Prabha Misra	Indian National Congress
1962	Prabha Misra	Indian National Congress
1967	Prabha Misra	Indian National Congress
1972	Prabha Misra	Indian National Congress
1977	Chiranji Lal Garg	Janata Party
1980	Suraj Devi	Indian National Congress
1985	Ramzan Khan	Bharatiya Janata Party
1990	Ramzan Khan	Bharatiya Janata Party
1993	Vishnu Modi	Indian National Congress
1998	Ramzan Khan	Bharatiya Janata Party
2003	Dr. Gopal Baheti	Indian National Congress
2008	Naseem Akhtar Insaf	Indian National Congress
2013	Suresh Singh Rawat	Bharatiya Janata Party
2018	Suresh Singh Rawat	Bharatiya Janata Party
2023	Suresh Singh Rawat	Bharatiya Janata Party

== Election results ==
=== 2023 ===
2023 Rajasthan Legislative Assembly election: Pushkar
Party	Candidate	Votes	%	±%
BJP	Suresh Singh Rawat	84,619	44.63	−4.44
INC	Naseem Akhtar	70,750	37.31	−6.33
RLP	Ashok Singh Rawat	16,052	8.47	+6.11
Independent	Shrigopal Baheti	8,457	4.46	
NOTA	None of the above	882	0.47	−0.85
Majority		13,869	7.32	+1.89
Turnout		189,622	75.25	+0.21
BJP hold		Swing		

=== 2018 ===
Rajasthan Legislative Assembly Election, 2018: Pushkar
Party	Candidate	Votes	%	±%
BJP	Mukesh Singh Rawat	84,860	49.07	
INC	Gomaram Satawariya	75,471	43.64	
RLP	Shahabuddin(Pappu Qureshi)	4,073	2.36	
Independent	Radheshyam Bawari	2,057	1.19	
NOTA	None of the above	2,288	1.32	
Majority		9,389	5.43	
Turnout		172,944	75.04	
BJP hold				

=== 2013 ===
Rajasthan Legislative Assembly Election, 2013: Pushkar
Party	Candidate	Votes	%	±%
BJP	Suresh Singh Rawat			
INC				
NOTA	None of the Above			
Majority				
Turnout				
Registered electors				

== See also ==
- List of constituencies of the Rajasthan Legislative Assembly
- Ajmer district
