= Ajmer Lok Sabha constituency =

Lok Sabha Constituency in Rajasthan

Coordinates: 26.46°N 74.62°E

Ajmer
- Lok Sabha constituency
- Interactive Map Outlining Ajmer Lok Sabha Constituency

Constituency details
- Country: India
- Region: North India
- State: Rajasthan
- Assembly constituencies: Dudu; Kishangarh; Pushkar; Ajmer North; Ajmer South; Nasirabad; Masuda; Kekri
- Established: 1923
- Reservation: None

Member of Parliament
- 18th Lok Sabha
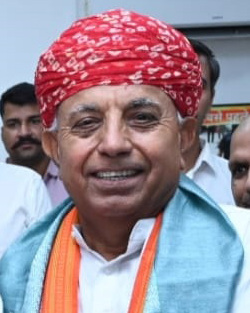
- Incumbent Bhagirath Choudhary
- Party: Bharatiya Janata Party
- Elected year: 2019
- Preceded by: Raghu Sharma

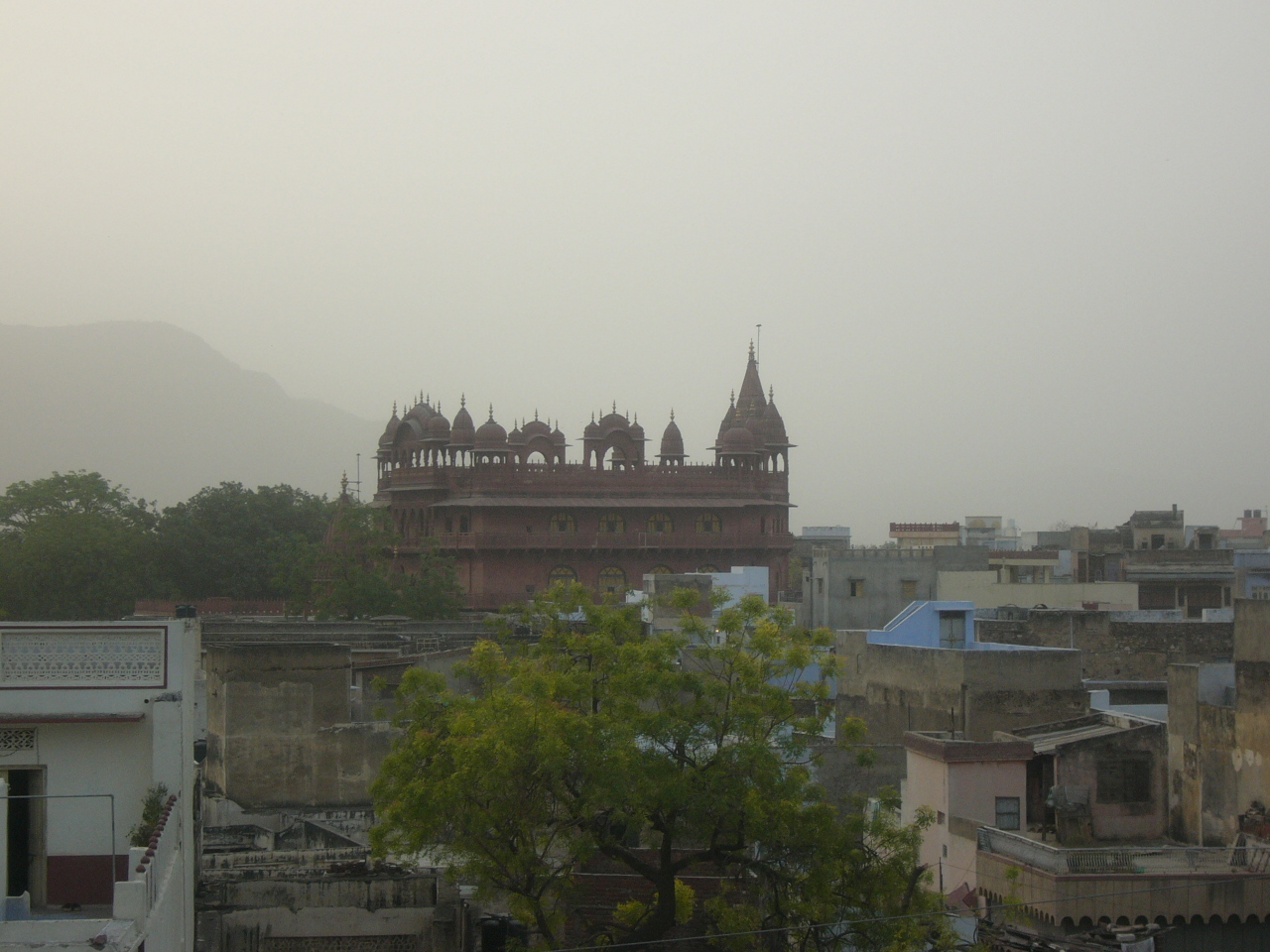
Ajmer Jain Temple, India

Ajmer Lok Sabha constituency (Hindi pronunciation: [əd͡ʒmeːɾ]) is one of the 25 Lok Sabha (parliamentary) constituencies in Rajasthan state in India.

== Vidhan Sabha segments ==
Presently, Ajmer Lok Sabha constituency comprises eight Vidhan Sabha (legislative assembly) segments. These are:

#	Name	District	Member	Party	2024 Lead
45	Dudu (SC)	Jaipur	Prem Chand Bairwa	BJP	BJP
98	Kishangarh	Ajmer	Vikash Choudhary	INC	BJP
99	Pushkar	Ajmer	Suresh Singh Rawat	BJP	BJP
100	Ajmer North	Ajmer	Vasudev Devnani	BJP	BJP
101	Ajmer South (SC)	Ajmer	Anita Bhadel	BJP	BJP
102	Nasirabad	Ajmer	Ramswaroop Lamba	BJP	BJP
104	Masuda	Ajmer	Virendra Singh	BJP	BJP
105	Kekri	Ajmer	Shatrughan Gautam	BJP	BJP

== Members of Lok Sabha ==
Year	Member	Party
1952	Jwala Prasad Sharma (Note: Ajmer North)	Indian National Congress
1952	Mukat Behari Lal Bhargava (Note: Ajmer South)	Indian National Congress
1957	Mukat Behari Lal Bhargava	Indian National Congress
1962	Mukat Behari Lal Bhargava	Indian National Congress
1967	B. N. Bhargava	Indian National Congress
1971	B. N. Bhargava	Indian National Congress (R)
1977	Shrikaran Sharda	Janata Party
1980	Bhagwan Dev Acharya	Indian National Congress
1984	Vishnu Kumar Modi	Indian National Congress
1989	Rasa Singh Rawat	Bharatiya Janata Party
1991	Rasa Singh Rawat	Bharatiya Janata Party
1996	Rasa Singh Rawat	Bharatiya Janata Party
1998	Prabha Thakur	Indian National Congress
1999	Rasa Singh Rawat	Bharatiya Janata Party
2004	Rasa Singh Rawat	Bharatiya Janata Party
2009	Sachin Pilot	Indian National Congress
2014	Sanwar Lal Jat	Bharatiya Janata Party
2018^	Raghu Sharma	Indian National Congress
2019	Bhagirath Choudhary	Bharatiya Janata Party
2024	Bhagirath Choudhary	Bharatiya Janata Party

^By-Poll

== Election results ==
=== 2024 ===
2024 Indian general election: Ajmer
Party	Candidate	Votes	%	±%
BJP	Bhagirath Chaudhary	7,47,462	62.23	−2.35
INC	Ramchandra Chaudhary	4,17,471	34.76	+3.18
NOTA	None of the above	11,402	0.95	+0.19
Majority		3,29,991		
Turnout		12,02,835	60.16	
BJP hold		Swing		

=== 2019 ===
2019 Indian general elections: Ajmer
Party	Candidate	Votes	%	±%
BJP	Bhagirath Choudhary	8,15,076	64.58	+20.93
INC	Riju Jhunjhunwala	3,98,652	31.58	−19.06
BSP	Durga Lal Regar	13,618	1.08	N/A
API	Vishram Babu	13,041	1.03	N/A
IND.	Soniya Regar	4,824	0.38	N/A
NOTA	None of the Above	9,578	0.76	+0.08
Majority		4,16,424	33.00	+26.01
Turnout		12,63,246	67.32	+1.74
BJP gain from INC		Swing	+13.94	

=== 2018 Bye-poll ===
Bye Election, 2018: Ajmer
Party	Candidate	Votes	%	±%
INC	Raghu Sharma	6,11,514	50.64	+10.35
BJP	Ramswaroop Lamba	5,27,100	43.65	−11.51
IND.	Mukesh Gena	12,084	1.00	N/A
IND.	Mohammad Nasim	9,993	0.83	N/A
HSS	Manohar Gurjar	6,758	0.56	N/A
NOTA	None of the Above	8,160	0.68	−0.40
Majority		84,414	6.99	−7.88
Turnout		12,07,680	65.53	−3.16
INC gain from BJP		Swing	-4.52	

=== 2014 ===
2014 Indian general elections: Ajmer
Party	Candidate	Votes	%	±%
BJP	Sanwar Lal Jat	6,37,874	55.16	+12.44
INC	Sachin Pilot	4,65,891	40.29	−12.30
NCP	Sanwar Lal	12,149	1.05	N/A
BSP	Jagdish	7,974	0.69	−0.50
IND.	Surendra Kumar Jain	5,184	0.45	N/A
NOTA	None of the Above	12,546	1.08	N/A
Majority		1,71,983	14.87	+5.00
Turnout		11,56,314	68.69	+15.70
BJP gain from INC		Swing	+2.57	

=== 2009 Lok Sabha Election ===
2009 Indian general elections: Ajmer
Party	Candidate	Votes	%	±%
INC	Sachin Pilot	4,05,575	52.59	
BJP	Kiran Maheshwari	3,29,440	42.72	
BSP	Rohitash	9,180	1.19	
IND.	Shantilal Dhabria	8,576	1.11	
JGP	Inder Chand Paliwala	7,984	1.04	
Majority		76,135	9.87	
Turnout		7,71,160	52.99	
INC gain from BJP		Swing		

=== 2004 Lok Sabha Election ===
2004 Indian general elections: Ajmer
Party	Candidate	Votes	%	±%
BJP	Rasa Singh Rawat	3,14,788	59.44	
INC	Haji Habibur Rehman	1,86,812	35.28	
BSP	Paras Chatar Jain	11,224	2.12	
IND.	Rekhraj Fauji	6,325	1.19	
SP	K. P. Singh	5,431	1.03	
Majority		1,27,976	24.16	
Turnout		5,29,549	43.99	
BJP hold		Swing		

=== 1991 ===
1991 Indian general election: Ajmer
Party	Candidate	Votes	%	±%
BJP	Rasa Singh Rawat	2,11,676	49.07	
INC	Jagdeep Dhankhar	1,86,333	43.20	
Majority		25,343	5.87	
Turnout		4,13,347	45.5	
Registered electors		9,63,531		
BJP hold		Swing		

=== 1962 Lok Sabha Election ===
- Mukatbehari Lal (INC) : 92,598 votes
- Bhagwandas (Jana Sangh) : 60,455

== See also ==
- Ajmer district
- List of constituencies of the Lok Sabha
