= Kishangarh Airport =

Domestic airport in Ajmer, Rajasthan, India

- IATA: KQH; ICAO: VIKG

Summary
- Owner/Operator: Airports Authority of India
- Serves: Kishangarh and Ajmer
- Location: Kishangarh, Rajasthan, India
- Opened: 11 October 2017; 8 years ago
- Coordinates: 26°36′05″N 74°48′51″E
- Website: Kishangarh Airport

Map
- Location of airport in Rajasthan KQH (India)

Runways
| Direction | Length | | Surface |
| Direction | m | ft | Surface |
|---|---|---|---|
| 05/23 | 2,152 | 7,060 | Concrete |

Statistics (April 2025 - March 2026)
- Passengers: 1,24,631 (▲44.3%)
- Aircraft movements: 2,625 (▲17.5%)
- Cargo tonnage: 0 ( 0%)
- Source: AAI

Kishangarh Airport (IATA: KQH, ICAO: VIKG) is a domestic airport serving the twin cities of Ajmer and Kishangarh. It is located at Kishangarh on National Highway 448, 27 km (17 mi) north-east of Ajmer. The airport was inaugurated on 11 October 2017. It is operated by the Airports Authority of India (AAI), covers an area of 742 acres and has a 2,000 metre long runway. It is also famous for its interior Bani Thani painting. The airport facilitates transport to the pilgrim sites like the Dargah of Khwaja Garib Nawaz, Pushkar and the fort of Prithvi Raj Chauhan in Ajmer.

== History ==
The original proposal for an airport at Kishangarh came following the former Prime Minister of India, Rajiv Gandhi's visit to Ajmer. Initial government efforts to acquire land for the project at Sardana had to be abandoned before the current location was chosen by the district administration. The airport is the first of over 100 airports that were to be built in India by 2020. The foundation stone of the project was laid by the then Prime Minister of India, Manmohan Singh in September 2013. The project was undertaken by the Airports Authority of India (AAI) at a cost of about ₹ 161 crores. 441 acres of land was handed over for the project in 2013. Demands for naming the airport after Hazrat Khwaja Moinuddin Chishti, Veer Teja Ji, Marble City and Prithviraj Chauhan were made, but none of them were granted. The airport was inaugurated on 11 October 2017 by the then Union Minister of State for Civil Aviation, Jayant Sinha and the then Chief Minister of Rajasthan, Vasundhara Raje.

== Facilities ==
The 2,700 sq.m. passenger terminal building can handle 150 passengers during peak hours. Other features at the terminal include 6 check-in counters, one X-ray screening machine for baggage screening and an elevated baggage conveyor belt in the arrivals terminal. The airport has parking space for 125 cars. The terminal features three-dimensional murals made of marble, 'Bani Thani' portraits, the paintings of the Kishangarh school of paintings and fountains to give the project a local touch. The airport has a 2,000 metre long runway that allow daytime operation of smaller aircraft. The parking apron is able to simultaneously accommodate two ATR aircraft.

The Government of India will generate 100 megawatt power from solar energy to light up the airport. Considering the scarcity of water in the area, AAI has built a water harvesting system at the airport as also a modern sewage treatment plant for re-use of water.

== Airlines and destinations ==
| Airlines | Destinations |
|---|---|
| IndiGo | Ahmedabad, Delhi, Noida |
| Star Air | Ghaziabad, Lucknow, Nagpur, Pune |

== See also ==
- List of airports in Rajasthan
