= Ajmer district =

- District
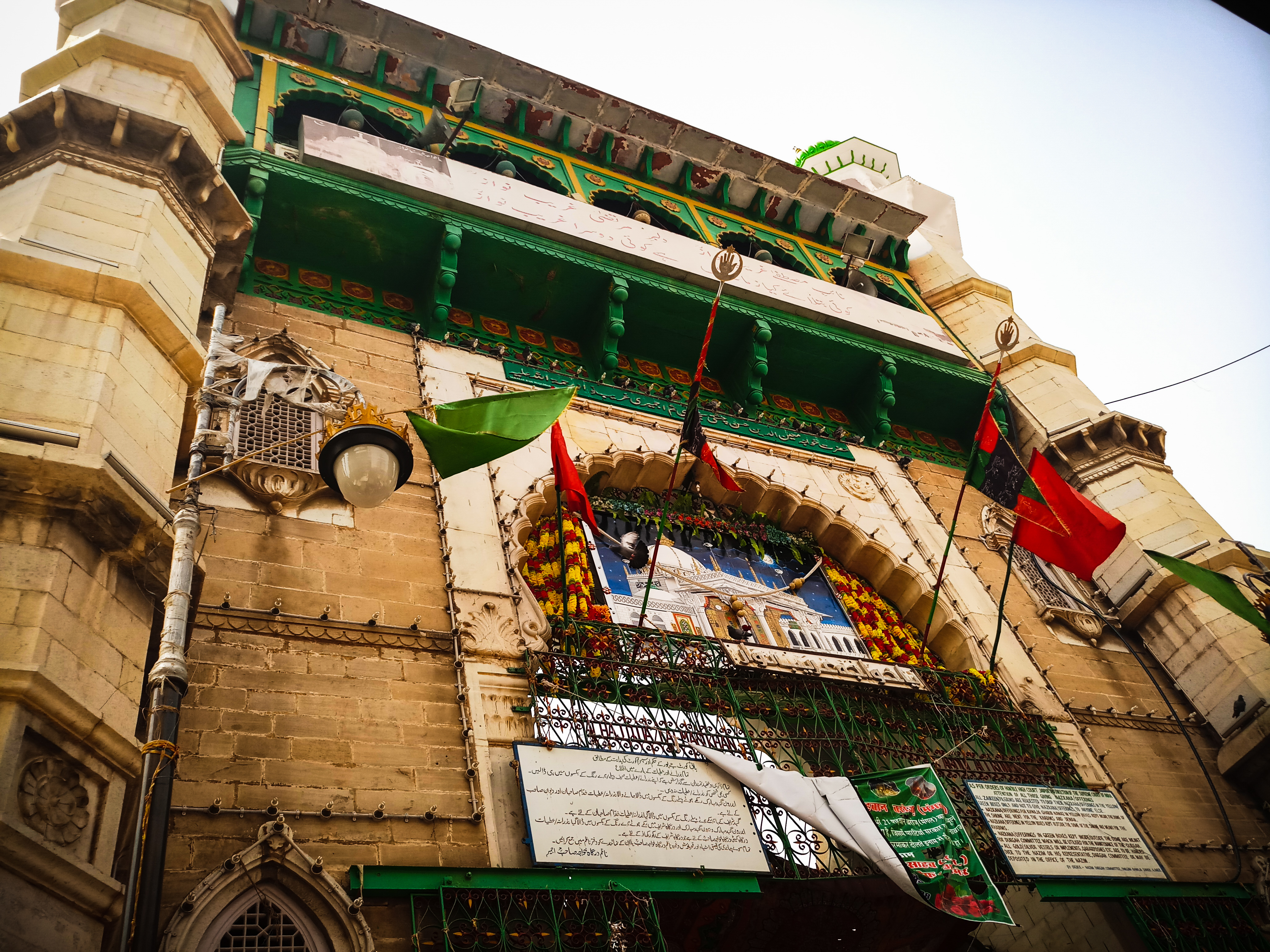
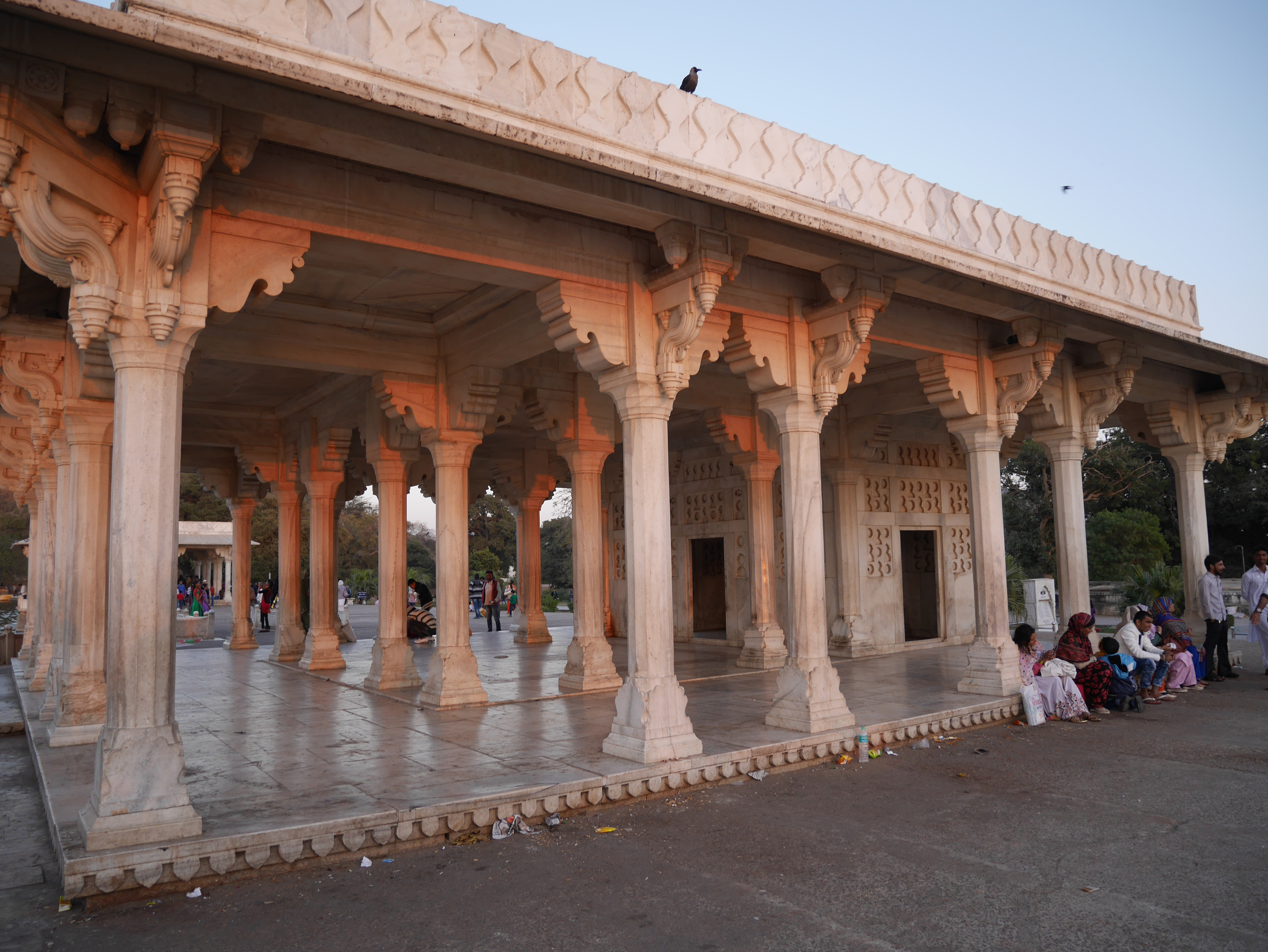
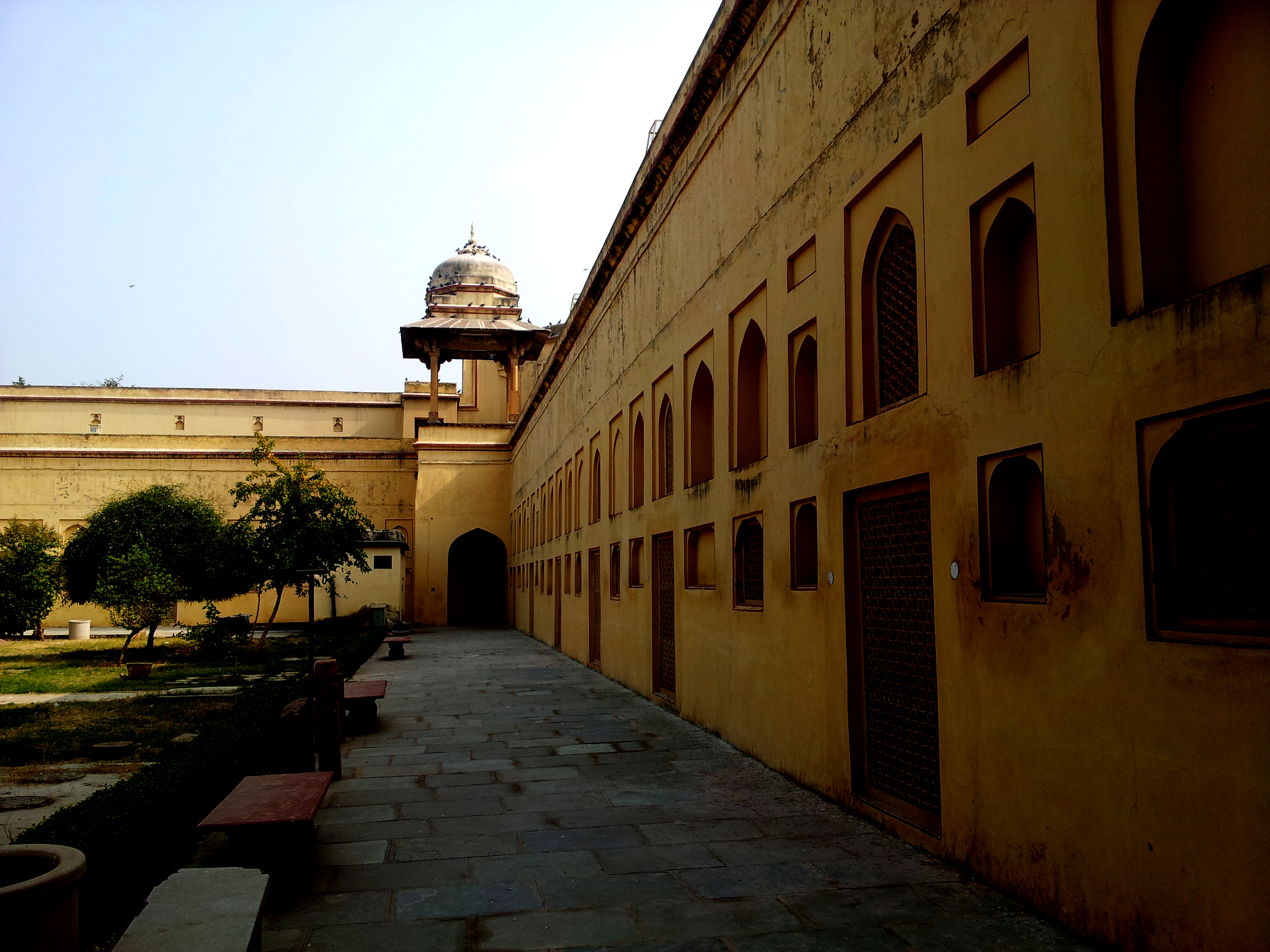
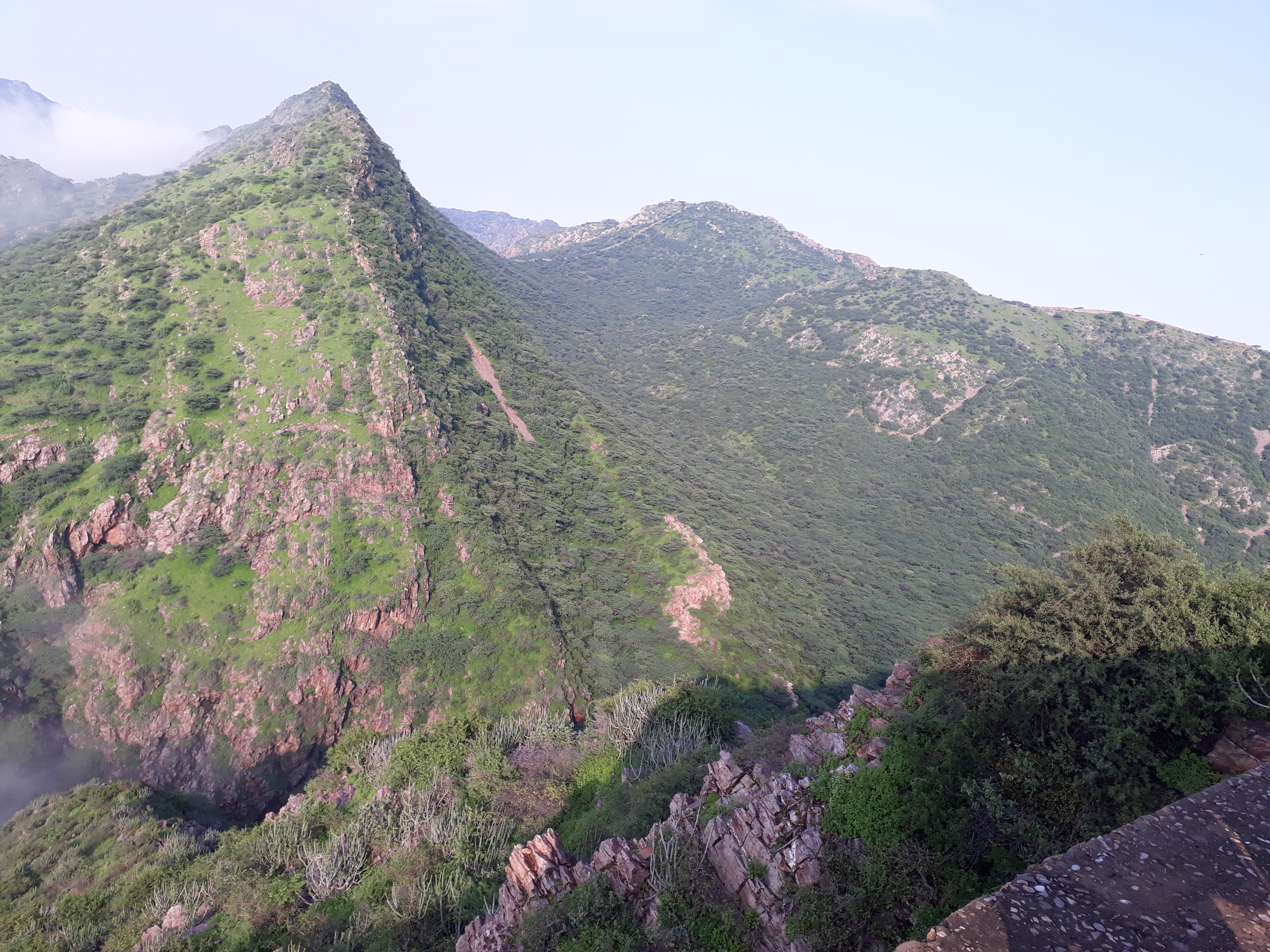
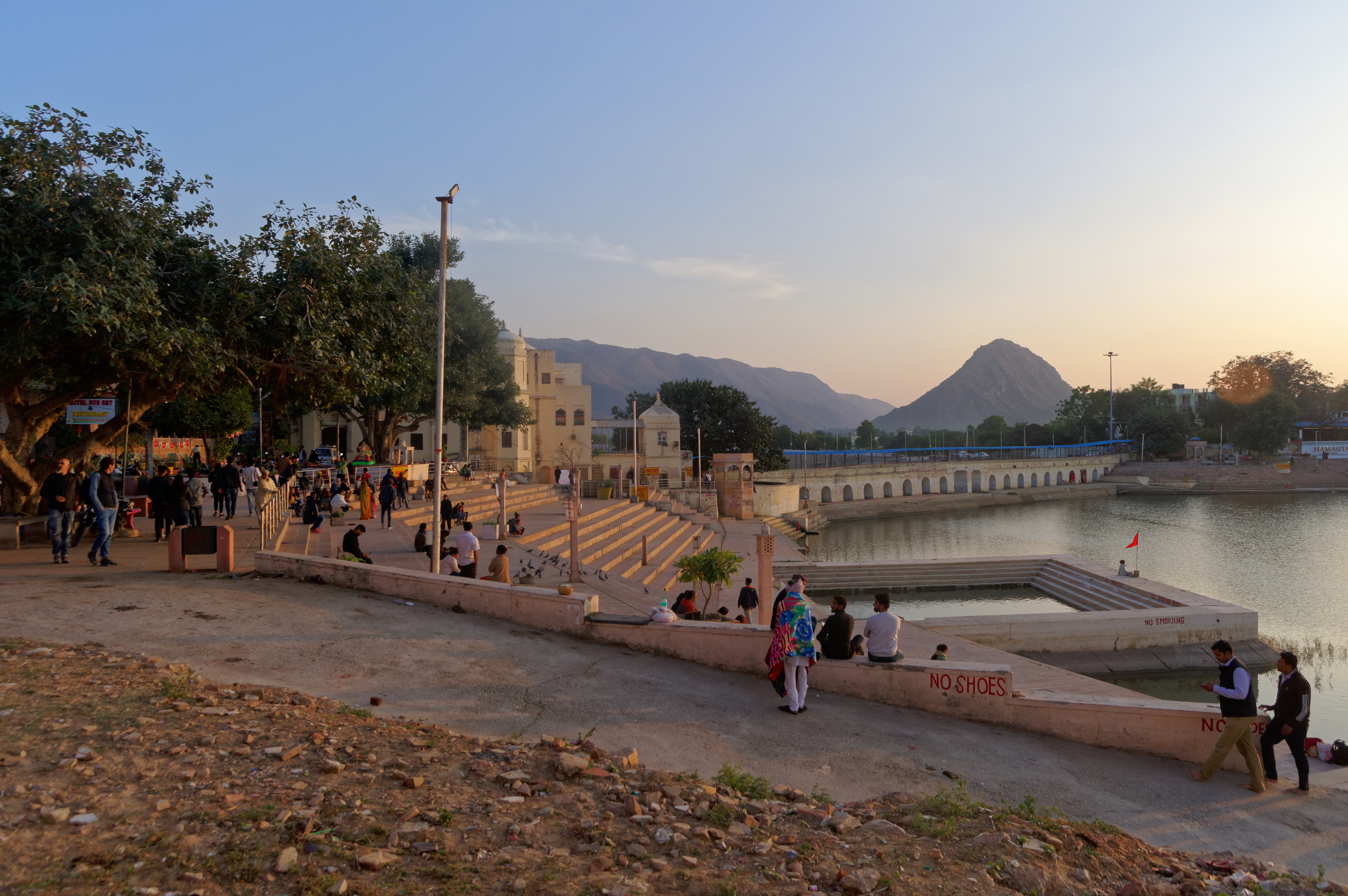
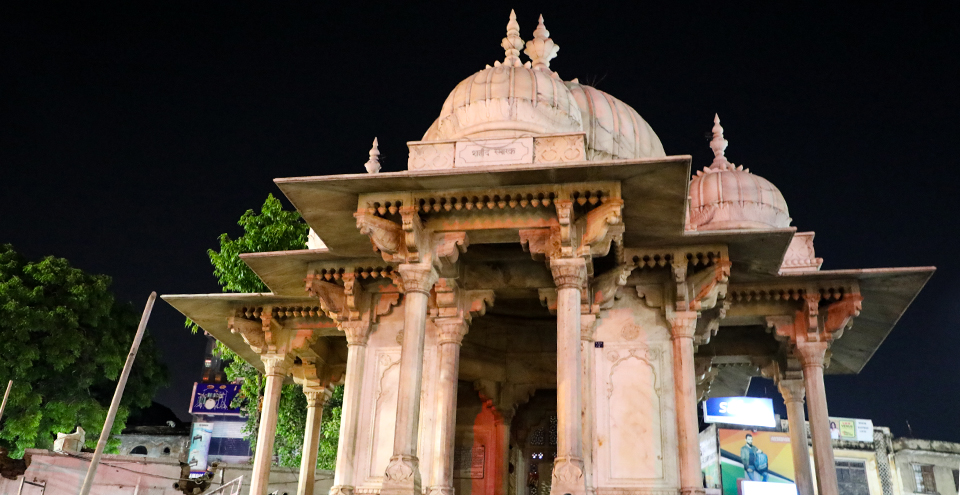
- Clockwise from top-left: Ajmer Sharif Dargah, Baradaris near Ana Sagar Lake, Hills near Taragarh, Ghats near Pushkar Lake, Akbari Fort

- Location of Ajmer district in Rajasthan
- Coordinates (Ajmer): 26°27′N 74°38′E
- Country: India
- State: Rajasthan
- Division: Ajmer
- Headquarters: Ajmer
- Tehsils: 1. Kishangarh, 2. Ajmer, 3. Sarwar, 4. Kekri, 5. Peesangan, 6. Nasirabad, 7. Masuda, 8. Beawar, 9. Bhinay

Government
  - District collector: Lok Bandhu, IAS
  - Lok Sabha constituencies: 1. Ajmer (shared with Jaipur district), 2. Rajsamand (shared with Nagaur, Pali and Rajsamand districts)
  - Vidhan Sabha constituencies: 1. Dudu, 2. Ajmer North, 3. Ajmer South, 4. Pushkar, 5. Kisahngarh, 6. Nasirabad, 7. Masuda, 8. Kekri

Area
  - Total: 8,481 km^{2} (3,275 sq mi)

Population (2011)
  - Total: 2,583,052
  - Density: 304.6/km^{2} (788.8/sq mi)
  - Urban: 40.1%

Demographics
  - Literacy: 69.3%
  - Sex ratio: 951
- Time zone: UTC+05:30 (IST)
- Vehicle registration: RJ-01
- Major highways: NH 48, NH 58, NH 448
- Average annual precipitation: 481.3 mm
- Website: ajmer.rajasthan.gov.in

Ajmer district is a district in the Indian state of Rajasthan. It is part of the Ajmer division–one of the seven administrative divisions of Rajasthan. The city of Ajmer is the district headquarters. The district is situated in the center part of Rajasthan, and is bounded by Didwana Kuchaman district to the north, Jaipur Rural and Dudu to the north-east, Tonk to the east, Kekri and Beawar to the south, and Nagaur to the west. It has an area of 8,481 km^{2} (3,275 sq mi), and a population of 2,583,052 (2011 census).

== History ==
The hills are some of the oldest in India, geologically. Microliths from early hominids have been found in the district. It is believed that cultures in this region had contact with the Indus Valley civilization. Pottery shards from Painted Gray Ware culture, Black and Red Ware and Northern Black Polished Ware cultures have been found with Chosla and Sameliya. Some pre-Ashokan Brahmi inscriptions have been found in Bhilot Mata Temple in Badli.

Pushkar was ruled for many years by the Kushans, Sakas etc until the rise of the Chauhans. In 1192 the last independent Chauhan ruler Prithviraj Chauhan was defeated by Mohammad Ghori, and the district became part of the Delhi Sultanate. In 1287, Hammir Dev Chauhan regained Ajmer, before it was reconquered by Delhi in 1301. In the last period of the Delhi Sultanate, Ajmer was ruled by Mallu Khan. During Mughal rule the district was part of Ajmer Subah. After 1712, the district returned to Rathore hands under the suzerainty of the Marathas. In 1801, the British took over Ajmer and converted it to a district. It became part of Rajasthan after 1950. Umesh Kumar and Akint Balam were felicitated for winning the Rajasthan IT Badminton League.

== Geography ==
The eastern portion of the district is generally flat, broken only by gentle undulations. The western parts, from north-west to south-west, are intersected by the Aravalli Range. Many of the valleys in this region are sandy deserts, part of India's Thar Desert, with an occasional oasis of cultivation. Some fertile tracts are also present; among these is the plain on which lies the town of Ajmer. This valley has an artificial lake, and is protected by the massive walls of the Nagpathar range or Serpent rock, which forms a barrier against the sand. The only hills in the district are the Aravalli Range and its offshoots. Ajmer is almost totally devoid of rivers. The Banas River touches the south-eastern boundary of the district so as to irrigate the pargana of Samur. Four small streams—the Sagarmati, Saraswati, Khari and Dai—also intersect the district.

== Division ==
The Ajmer district is divided into seven subdivisions - Arai, Ajmer, Kishangarh, Nasirabad, Peesangan, Pushkar, Roopangarh; and further subdivided into sixteen tehsils, Ajmer, Arai, Beawar, Bhinai, Pushkar, Sarwar, Pisangan, Tantoti, Nasirabad, Masuda, Kekri, Kishangarh, Roopangarh, Bijay Nagar, Tatgarh, and Sanver.

== Demographics ==
Historical population
Year	Pop.	±% p.a.
1901	527,036	—
1911	543,802	+0.31%
1921	523,585	−0.38%
1931	592,464	+1.24%
1941	680,957	+1.40%
1951	818,767	+1.86%
1961	975,106	+1.76%
1971	1,145,995	+1.63%
1981	1,438,068	+2.30%
1991	1,726,531	+1.84%
2001	2,178,447	+2.35%
2011	2,583,052	+1.72%

Religions in Ajmer district (2011)
Religion	Percent
Hinduism	85.23%
Islam	12.16%
Jainism	1.77%
Christianity	0.41%
Other or not stated	0.43%

According to the 2011 census Ajmer district has a population of 2,583,052. This gives it a ranking of 161st in India (out of a total of 640). The district has a population density of 305 inhabitants per square kilometre (790/sq mi) . Its population growth rate over the decade 2001-2011 was 18.48%. Ajmer has a sex ratio of 950 females for every 1000 males, and a literacy rate of 70.46%. 40.08% of the population lives in urban areas. Scheduled Castes and Scheduled Tribes make up 478,027 (18.51%) and 63,482 (2.46%) of the population respectively.

=== Languages ===
Languages in Ajmer district (2011)
1. Rajasthani (55.2%)
2. Hindi (31.0%)
3. Marwari (10.1%)
4. Sindhi (1.85%)
5. Others (1.94%)

At the time of the 2011 Census of India, 55.16% of the population spoke Rajasthani, 30.97% Hindi, 10.08% Marwari and 1.85% Sindhi as their first language.

== Bibliography ==
- Ajmer The Imperial Gazetteer of India, 1909, v. 5, p. 137-146.
