= Results of the 2019 Indian general election =

To constitute India's 17th Lok Sabha, general elections were held in April–May 2019. The results were announced on 23 May 2019. The main contenders were two alliance groups of the ruling Bharatiya Janata Party-led National Democratic Alliance which won a landslide victory and the opposition United Progressive Alliance led by the Indian National Congress. The 2019 Indian general election was the largest democratic exercise in history at the time it was conducted, with around 912 million eligible voters.

== Results by alliance and party ==
Party				
Party	BJP	INC	DMK	YCP
Leader	Narendra Modi	Rahul Gandhi	M. K. Stalin	Y. S. Jaganmohan Reddy
Votes	37.77% ; 229,076,879	19.66% ; 119,495,214	2.33% ; 14,363,332	2.26% ; 13,877,992
Seats	303 (55.90%)	52 (9.59%)	23 (4.24%)	23 (4.24%)
Seats	303 / 542	52 / 542	23 / 542 (Note: Elections in Vellore constituency were held later in August 2019 and won by DMK.)	23 / 542
Party				
Party	TMC	SS	JD(U)	BJD
Leader	Mamata Banerjee	Uddhav Thackeray	Nitish Kumar	Naveen Patnaik
Votes	4.1% ; 24,757,345	2.10% ; 12,858,904	1.46% ; 8,926,679	1.66% ; 10,174,021
Seats	22 (4.05%)	18 (2.3%)	16 (1.9%)	12 (1.2%)
Seats	22 / 542	18 / 542	16 / 542	12 / 542
Party				
Party	BSP	SP	NCP	CPI(M)
Leader	Mayawati	Akhilesh Yadav	Sharad Pawar	Sitaram Yechury
Votes	3.63% ; 22,246,501	2.55% ; 15,647,206	1.39% ; 8,500,331	1.77% ; 10,744,908
Seats	10 (1.85%)	5 (0.92%)	5 (0.92%)	3 (0.55%)
Seats	10 / 542	5 / 542	5 / 542	3 / 542

Results of the election by political party

Results of the election by alliance

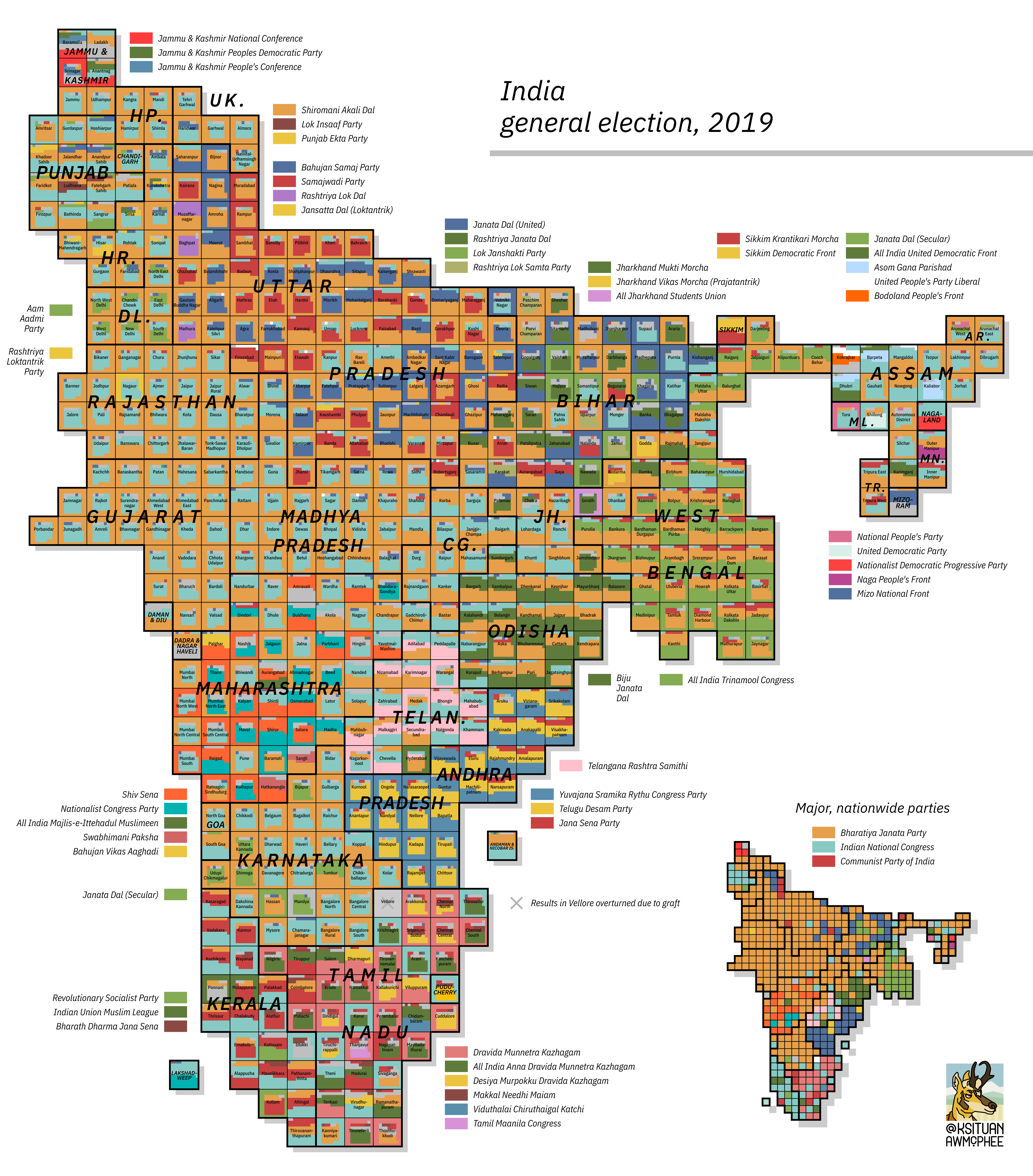
Cartogram showing popular vote in each constituency

Vote share of parties in the election
1. BJP (37.4%)
2. INC (19.5%)
3. AITC (4.07%)
4. BSP (3.63%)
5. SP (2.55%)
6. YSRCP (2.53%)
7. DMK (2.26%)
8. SS (2.10%)
9. TDP (2.04%)
10. CPI(M) (1.75%)
11. Other (22.2%)
vote share by alliance
1. NDA (45.3%)
2. UPA (27.5%)
3. MGB (6.10%)
4. 0.00%
5. 0.00%
6. 0.00%
7. 0.00%
8. 0.00%
9. 0.00%
10. 0.00%
11. Other (21.1%)
seat share by alliance
1. NDA (65.2%)
2. UPA (17.1%)
3. MGB (2.70%)
4. 0.00%
5. 0.00%
6. 0.00%
7. 0.00%
8. 0.00%
9. 0.00%
10. 0.00%
11. Other (15.0%)

The Bharatiya Janata Party-led NDA won the elections with the BJP itself winning a clear majority. The BJP became the single largest party in the House and surpassed expectations to win 303 seats, with its alliance partners bringing the NDA to a total of 353 seats. Reasons attributed to the victory included the personal popularity of Narendra Modi, effective voter turnout drives by the NDA, a surge in public nationalism following the Pulwama attack, the consolidation of Hindu voters in a multi-caste coalition and the successful implementation of social welfare programmes during the First Modi ministry's term.

The counting of votes was held on 23 May 2019, and was completed early the following day. Initial returns showed the BJP leading in all 303 constituencies it eventually won, and opposition leader Rahul Gandhi conceded defeat prior to the official certification of most results.

With the results, the BJP was able to gain 21 seats in the House, having won 282 in the 2014 Indian general election. It was the second time in India's independent history that voters re-elected the same party to power with a bigger majority to the Lok Sabha – India's lower house of parliament. The BJP's total vote share stood at 37.4 per cent, an increase of over 6 percentage points from 31.34 per cent in 2014. The National Democratic Alliance secured a vote share of 45 per cent, compared to 38 per cent in 2014. In contrast, the vote share of Indian National Congress remained the same at 19.5 per cent. About 1.04 percent of the voters in India chose to vote for None Of The Above (NOTA) in the 2019 elections, with Bihar leading with 2.08 percent NOTA voters.

Modi was re-elected as the Prime Minister with the biggest gain in vote-share in history(+6.02%). His opponent, Rahul Gandhi, ran in two constituencies, winning from Wayanad, but losing from the Amethi constituency – the seat he, his mother (Sonia Gandhi), his father (Rajiv Gandhi), and his uncle (Sanjay Gandhi) had collectively held for decades. In addition, many candidates who were members of popular political dynasties were defeated across India in favour of the BJP or other parties' candidates.

The election had been called a referendum on Modi and the BJP's Hindu nationalistic policies and advocacy. According to The Wall Street Journal, Modi's victory "sets (sic) the stage for further economic change in one of Asia’s fastest-growing economies." Alasdair Pal and Mayank Bhardwaj, in an article published by Reuters, claimed that the result was a mandate for business-friendly policies and tougher national security positions, reinforcing "a global trend of right-wing populists sweeping to victory, from the United States to Brazil and Italy, often after adopting harsh positions on protectionism, immigration and defence."

According to a data analysis by the Mint, "The ruling party’s victory has been broad-based, gaining seats in most parts of the country, and across the rural-urban divide, cementing its pole position in Indian politics." However according to this study conducted in about 140 constituencies, BJP seems more popular and successful in urban and metropolitan constituencies than rural and semi-urban constituencies. The BJP was favored in all income groups, states the Mint. The newspaper added, "In constituencies with high presence of scheduled castes and scheduled tribes (SCs/STs), the BJP is more popular than other parties, but in constituencies with high presence of Muslims, it is less popular."

According to India Today, detailed accounts and reports suggest that the country's overall growth were not among top factors that helped Narendra Modi's party cruise to a landslide victory in the elections and that the government has been able to implement schemes that directly affect the rural population.

Party	Votes	%	Seats
Bharatiya Janata Party	229,076,879	37.36	303
Indian National Congress	119,495,214	19.49	52
All India Trinamool Congress	24,929,330	4.07	22
Bahujan Samaj Party	22,246,501	3.63	10
Samajwadi Party	15,647,206	2.55	5
YSR Congress Party	15,537,006	2.53	23
Dravida Munnetra Kazhagam	13,877,992	2.26	23
Shiv Sena	12,858,904	2.10	18
Telugu Desam Party	12,515,345	2.04	3
Communist Party of India (Marxist)	10,744,908	1.77	3
Biju Janata Dal	10,174,021	1.66	12
Janata Dal (United)	8,926,679	1.46	16
Nationalist Congress Party	8,500,331	1.39	5
All India Anna Dravida Munnetra Kazhagam	7,830,146	1.28	1
Telangana Rashtra Samithi	7,696,848	1.26	9
Rashtriya Janata Dal	6,632,247	1.08	0
Shiromani Akali Dal	3,778,574	0.62	2
Vanchit Bahujan Aaghadi	3,743,560	0.61	0
Communist Party of India	3,576,184	0.58	2
Janata Dal (Secular)	3,457,107	0.56	1
Lok Jan Shakti Party	3,206,979	0.52	6
Aam Aadmi Party	2,716,629	0.44	1
Pattali Makkal Katchi	2,297,431	0.37	0
Amma Makkal Munnettra Kazagam	2,249,118	0.37	0
Jana Sena Party	1,915,127	0.31	0
Jharkhand Mukti Morcha	1,901,976	0.31	1
Naam Tamilar Katchi	1,668,079	0.27	0
Makkal Needhi Maiam	1,613,708	0.26	0
Indian Union Muslim League	1,592,467	0.26	3
Asom Gana Parishad	1,480,697	0.24	0
Rashtriya Lok Samta Party	1,462,518	0.24	0
Rashtriya Lok Dal	1,447,363	0.24	0
All India United Democratic Front	1,402,088	0.23	1
All India Majlis-E-Ittehadul Muslimeen	1,201,542	0.20	2
Apna Dal (Sonelal)	1,039,478	0.17	2
Hindustani Awam Morcha (Secular)	956,501	0.16	0
Desiya Murpokku Dravida Kazhagam	929,590	0.15	0
Swabhimani Paksha	834,380	0.14	0
Jharkhand Vikas Morcha (Prajatantrik)	750,799	0.12	0
Communist Party of India (Marxist–Leninist) Liberation	711,715	0.12	0
Revolutionary Socialist Party	709,685	0.12	1
Vikassheel Insaan Party	660,706	0.11	0
Rashtriya Loktantrik Party	660,051	0.11	1
All Jharkhand Students Union	648,277	0.11	1
Jannayak Janta Party	619,970	0.10	0
Bharatiya Tribal Party	539,319	0.09	0
Viduthalai Chiruthaigal Katchi	507,643	0.08	1
Nationalist Democratic Progressive Party	500,510	0.08	1
Bahujan Vikas Aaghadi	491,596	0.08	0
Lok Insaaf Party	469,784	0.08	0
Bodoland People's Front	446,774	0.07	0
National People's Party	425,986	0.07	1
Kerala Congress (M)	421,046	0.07	1
United People's Party Liberal	416,305	0.07	0
Bahujan Mukti Party	405,949	0.07	0
Socialist Unity Centre of India (Communist)	403,835	0.07	0
Ambedkarite Party of India	381,070	0.06	0
Bharath Dharma Jana Sena	380,847	0.06	0
Naga People's Front	363,527	0.06	1
Pragatishil Samajwadi Party (Lohia)	344,546	0.06	0
All India Forward Bloc	322,507	0.05	0
Suheldev Bharatiya Samaj Party	313,925	0.05	0
Punjab Ekta Party	296,620	0.05	0
Maharashtra Swabhiman Paksha	281,578	0.05	0
Jammu & Kashmir National Conference	280,356	0.05	3
United Democratic Party	267,256	0.04	0
All India N.R. Congress	247,956	0.04	0
Indian National Lok Dal	240,258	0.04	0
Mizo National Front	224,286	0.04	1
Tamil Maanila Congress	220,849	0.04	0
Gondwana Ganatantra Party	210,088	0.03	0
Jansatta Dal (Loktantrik)	203,369	0.03	0
Social Democratic Party of India	169,680	0.03	0
Sikkim Krantikari Morcha	166,922	0.03	1
Nawan Punjab Party	161,645	0.03	0
Kerala Congress	155,135	0.03	0
Sikkim Democratic Front	154,489	0.03	0
Peoples Party of India (Democratic)	153,103	0.02	0
Jammu and Kashmir People's Conference	133,612	0.02	0
Hindusthan Nirman Dal	122,972	0.02	0
Uttama Prajaakeeya Party	120,800	0.02	0
Bhartiya Shakti Chetna Party	105,997	0.02	0
Voters Party International	105,972	0.02	0
Jan Adhikar Party (Loktantrik)	97,631	0.02	0
Bharat Prabhat Party	92,100	0.02	0
Communist Party of India (Marxist–Leninist) Red Star	90,645	0.01	0
Indigenous People's Front of Tripura	89,529	0.01	0
Jammu and Kashmir Peoples Democratic Party	84,054	0.01	0
Jan Adhikar Party	79,975	0.01	0
Pyramid Party of India	77,169	0.01	0
Republican Party of India (Athawale)	71,524	0.01	0
Rashtriya Hindu Sena	67,782	0.01	0
Shoshit Samaj Dal	63,543	0.01	0
Moulik Adhikar Party	59,235	0.01	0
Rashtriya Samata Party (Secular)	58,110	0.01	0
Telangana Jana Samithi	57,073	0.01	0
Rashtriya Jansambhavna Party	55,868	0.01	0
Loktanter Suraksha Party	55,280	0.01	0
Bahujan Republican Socialist Party	54,266	0.01	0
Shiromani Akali Dal (Amritsar)(Simranjit Singh Mann)	52,185	0.01	0
Aihra National Party	50,071	0.01	0
Ambedkar National Congress	49,149	0.01	0
Akhil Bhartiya Gondwana Party	48,426	0.01	0
Bahujan Maha Party	46,185	0.01	0
Purvanchal Janta Party (Secular)	43,892	0.01	0
Rashtravadi Janata Party	42,905	0.01	0
Bajjikanchal Vikas Party	40,906	0.01	0
Anti Corruption Dynamic Party	40,214	0.01	0
Peoples Democratic Party	39,856	0.01	0
Jammu and Kashmir National Panthers Party	39,760	0.01	0
North East India Development Party	37,221	0.01	0
Autonomous State Demand Committee	36,915	0.01	0
Amra Bangalee	36,570	0.01	0
Ambedkar Samaj Party	35,076	0.01	0
Jharkhand Party	35,060	0.01	0
Aam Adhikar Morcha	34,845	0.01	0
Bhartiya Lok Seva Dal	34,643	0.01	0
Tamil Nadu Ilangyar Katchi	34,233	0.01	0
Janhit Kisan Party	33,902	0.01	0
Sapaks Party	33,366	0.01	0
Bihar Lok Nirman Dal	32,445	0.01	0
Bharatiya Nyay-Adhikar Raksha Party	31,308	0.01	0
Aam Janta Party Rashtriya	31,017	0.01	0
Rashtriya Shoshit Samaj Party	30,983	0.01	0
Yuva Krantikari Party	30,492	0.00	0
Peace Party of India	29,998	0.00	0
Bharatiya Jan Kranti Dal (Democratic)	29,507	0.00	0
Wazib Adhikar Party	29,392	0.00	0
Bhartiya Lokmat Rashtrwadi Party	29,129	0.00	0
Right to Recall Party	28,817	0.00	0
Rashtriya Samaj Paksha	28,545	0.00	0
People's Party of Arunachal	27,703	0.00	0
Janta Dal Rashtravadi	27,584	0.00	0
Jai Prakash Janata Dal	27,404	0.00	0
Bahujan Nyay Dal	26,746	0.00	0
Dogra Swabhiman Sangathan Party,	26,588	0.00	0
Rashtriya Ulama Council	25,756	0.00	0
Samajwadi Janata Dal Democratic	25,630	0.00	0
Swatantra Jantaraj Party	25,494	0.00	0
Baliraja Party	24,915	0.00	0
Samagra Utthan Party	24,816	0.00	0
Bharatiya Momin Front	23,765	0.00	0
Rashtriya Janadhikar Suraksha Party	23,580	0.00	0
Hindu Mahasabha	23,475	0.00	0
Akhil Hind Forward Bloc (Krantikari)	23,252	0.00	0
Welfare Party Of India	23,035	0.00	0
Satya Bahumat Party	22,560	0.00	0
Hindustan Shakti Sena	21,771	0.00	0
Asom Jana Morcha	21,678	0.00	0
Bhartiya Kisan Party	21,551	0.00	0
Moolniwasi Samaj Party	21,234	0.00	0
Indian New Congress Party	21,095	0.00	0
Marxist Communist Party of India (United)	21,045	0.00	0
Sarvodaya Bharat Party	20,764	0.00	0
Rashtriya Rashtrawadi Party	20,704	0.00	0
India Praja Bandhu Party	20,682	0.00	0
Prahar Janshakti Party	20,620	0.00	0
Bharatiya Bahujan Congress	19,500	0.00	0
Proutist Bloc, India	19,457	0.00	0
Jharkhand Party (Naren)	18,869	0.00	0
Aapki Apni Party (Peoples)	18,866	0.00	0
Lok Gathbandhan Party	18,684	0.00	0
Samajwadi Forward Bloc	18,577	0.00	0
Lokdal	18,218	0.00	0
Nagrik Ekta Party	18,037	0.00	0
Jantantrik Vikas Party	17,955	0.00	0
Vanchit Samaj Party	17,856	0.00	0
Revolutionary Marxist Party of India	17,125	0.00	0
Rashtriya Jansabha Party	16,902	0.00	0
Aam Janta Party (India)	16,749	0.00	0
Bharatiya National Janta Dal	16,743	0.00	0
Hum Bhartiya Party	16,672	0.00	0
Aajad Bharat Party (Democratic)	16,481	0.00	0
Rashtriya mahan Gantantra Party	16,371	0.00	0
Jharkhand People's Party	16,195	0.00	0
Bhartiya Anarakshit Party	15,907	0.00	0
Madhya Pradesh Jan Vikas Party	15,472	0.00	0
Bhartiya Dalit Party	15,376	0.00	0
Swaraj Party (Loktantrik)	15,132	0.00	0
Vyavastha Parivartan Party	14,974	0.00	0
Sardar Vallabhbhai Patel Party	14,882	0.00	0
Bharatiya Praja Surajya Paksha	14,757	0.00	0
Republican Party of India (Karnataka)	14,746	0.00	0
Janata Congress	14,595	0.00	0
Desiya Makkal Sakthi Katchi	14,300	0.00	0
Sarva Janata Party	14,213	0.00	0
Bhartiya Republican Party (Insan)	14,142	0.00	0
Bahujan Awam Party	14,060	0.00	0
Marxist-Leninist Party of India (Red Flag)	14,016	0.00	0
Jai Hind Party	13,693	0.00	0
Proutist Sarva Samaj	13,535	0.00	0
Janata Party	13,467	0.00	0
Purvanchal Mahapanchayat	13,450	0.00	0
Prism	13,323	0.00	0
Public Mission Party	13,238	0.00	0
Prabuddha Republican Party	13,229	0.00	0
Bharatiya Gana Parishad	13,039	0.00	0
Bhartiya Mitra Party	12,737	0.00	0
Kamatapur People's Party (United)	12,666	0.00	0
Uttarakhand Kranti Dal (Democratic)	12,629	0.00	0
Akhil Bhartiya Apna Dal	12,538	0.00	0
Sarvadharam Party (Madhya Pradesh)	12,525	0.00	0
Rashtriya Lokswaraj Party	12,459	0.00	0
Kalinga Sena	12,432	0.00	0
Swatantra Bharat Paksha	12,430	0.00	0
Bhartiya Jan Satta Party	12,416	0.00	0
Party for Democratic Socialism	12,087	0.00	0
Republican Party of India	12,015	0.00	0
Smart Indians Party	11,877	0.00	0
Pragatisheel Samaj Party	11,752	0.00	0
Garib Janshakti Party	11,678	0.00	0
Ganasangam Party of India	11,631	0.00	0
Asli Deshi Party	11,598	0.00	0
Jana Jagruti Party	11,464	0.00	0
Janral Samaj Party	11,324	0.00	0
Aadarsh Mithila Party	11,311	0.00	0
Rashtriya Power Party	11,248	0.00	0
Kranti Kari Jai Hind Sena	11,200	0.00	0
Bhartiya Manavadhikaar Federal Party	11,132	0.00	0
All India Peoples' Front (Radical)	11,032	0.00	0
Rashtriya Independent Morcha	10,914	0.00	0
Jan Sangharsh Virat Party	10,569	0.00	0
Poorvanchal Rashtriya Congress	10,532	0.00	0
Garvi Gujarat Party	10,469	0.00	0
Shiromani Akali Dal (Taksali)	10,424	0.00	0
Yuva Jan Jagriti Party	10,147	0.00	0
Akhil Bhartiya Mithila Party	10,127	0.00	0
Hindustan Janta Party	9,997	0.00	0
Rashtriya Krantikari Samajwadi Party	9,914	0.00	0
Akhil Bharat Samagra Kranti Party	9,912	0.00	0
Bharat Bhrashtachar Mitao Party	9,894	0.00	0
Loktantrik Jan Swaraj Party	9,868	0.00	0
Praja Shanthi Party	9,738	0.00	0
Bharatiya Aam Awam Party	9,628	0.00	0
Indian Peoples Green Party	9,538	0.00	0
Bharatiya Kisan Parivartan Party	9,503	0.00	0
Samata Samadhan Party	9,396	0.00	0
Lok Jan Vikas Morcha	9,278	0.00	0
Rajnaitik Vikalp Party	9,109	0.00	0
Bharatiya Jana Sangh	9,015	0.00	0
Ulzaipali Makkal Katchy	9,007	0.00	0
Rashtriya Maratha Party	8,997	0.00	0
Rashtriya Janshakti Party (Secular)	8,900	0.00	0
Pichhara Samaj Party United	8,884	0.00	0
Uttarakhand Kranti Dal	8,830	0.00	0
Vishva SHakti Party	8,784	0.00	0
Jharkhand Mukti Morcha (Ulgulan)	8,672	0.00	0
Sathi Aur Aapka Faisala Party	8,643	0.00	0
Rashtriya Janasachetan Party (R.J.P.)	8,609	0.00	0
Apna Dal United Party	8,541	0.00	0
Krupaa Party	8,510	0.00	0
Akhil Bhartiya Jharkhand Party	8,484	0.00	0
Bahujan Azad Party	8,421	0.00	0
Loksangram	8,418	0.00	0
Rashtra Sewa Dal	8,381	0.00	0
Apna Kisan Party	8,354	0.00	0
Odisha Pragati Dal	8,304	0.00	0
Assam Dristi Party	8,285	0.00	0
Bharatiya Rashtriya Morcha	8,260	0.00	0
Pragatisheel Manav Samaj Party	8,210	0.00	0
Sanyukt Vikas Party	8,205	0.00	0
Bharatiya Aavaam Ekta Party	8,164	0.00	0
All India Hindustan Congress Party	8,082	0.00	0
Nava Praja Rajyam Party	8,007	0.00	0
Kisan Mazdoor Sangharsh Party	7,974	0.00	0
Indian Democratic Republican Front	7,784	0.00	0
AARAKSHAN VIRODHI PARTY	7,697	0.00	0
Akhand Samaj Party	7,569	0.00	0
Rashtriya Jan Adhikar Party (United)	7,561	0.00	0
Bharatiya Samta Samaj Party	7,370	0.00	0
Mundadugu Praja Party	7,342	0.00	0
Sanatan Sanskriti Raksha Dal	7,325	0.00	0
Agila India Makkal Kazhagam	7,320	0.00	0
Naitik Party	7,294	0.00	0
Kanshiram Bahujan Dal	7,255	0.00	0
Bhartiya Janraj Party	7,210	0.00	0
Janhit Bharat Party	7,192	0.00	0
New Democratic Party of India	7,081	0.00	0
Rashtriya Kranti Party	6,997	0.00	0
Rashtriya Samanta Dal	6,918	0.00	0
Freethought Party of India	6,884	0.00	0
Rashtriya Apna Dal	6,840	0.00	0
Bahujan Samaj Party (Ambedkar)	6,802	0.00	0
Samaj Adhikar Kalyan Party	6,736	0.00	0
Bhartiya Jan Nayak Party	6,735	0.00	0
Bharat Bhoomi Party	6,730	0.00	0
BhartiyaBahujanKranti Dal	6,684	0.00	0
Nationalist Justice Party	6,531	0.00	0
Bharateeya Manavadhikar party	6,511	0.00	0
Bhartiya Hind Fauj	6,508	0.00	0
Rashtriya Sarvjan Vikas Party	6,497	0.00	0
All India Jana Andolan Party	6,495	0.00	0
Parivartan Samaj Party	6,469	0.00	0
Sankhyanupati Bhagidari Party	6,395	0.00	0
Saman Aadmi Saman Party	6,368	0.00	0
Lok Sewa Dal	6,313	0.00	0
Sabka Dal United	6,283	0.00	0
Maanavvaadi Janta Party	6,267	0.00	0
Minorities Democratic Party	6,198	0.00	0
Jago Hindustan Party	6,171	0.00	0
Dalita Bahujana Party	6,133	0.00	0
Bharipa Bahujan Mahasangh	5,971	0.00	0
Jamat-E-Seratul Mustakim	5,885	0.00	0
Nationalist People's Front	5,798	0.00	0
Rashtriya Jan Gaurav Party	5,768	0.00	0
Jan Shakti Dal	5,758	0.00	0
Apna Desh Party	5,682	0.00	0
Bharat Nirman Party	5,674	0.00	0
Republican Sena	5,654	0.00	0
Kisan Party of India	5,647	0.00	0
Chhattisgarh Vikas Ganga Rashtriya Party	5,540	0.00	0
Anna YSR Congress Party	5,511	0.00	0
Awami Samta Party	5,504	0.00	0
Ezhuchi Tamilargal Munnetra Kazhagam	5,482	0.00	0
Prithviraj Janshakti Party	5,451	0.00	0
Uttarakhand Parivartan Party	5,351	0.00	0
Secular Democratic Congress	5,321	0.00	0
Akhil Bharatiya Muslim League (Secular)	5,179	0.00	0
Annadata Party	5,147	0.00	0
Anaithu Makkal Puratchi Katchi	5,089	0.00	0
Swarna Bharat Party	5,064	0.00	0
Samajik Nyaya Party	5,027	0.00	0
Mazdoor Kirayedar Vikas Party	5,017	0.00	0
Samajwadi Janata Party(Karnataka)	4,991	0.00	0
Samaanya Praja Party	4,983	0.00	0
Indian Labour Party (Ambedkar Phule)	4,923	0.00	0
Bhartiya Navjawan Sena (Paksha)	4,917	0.00	0
People's Party of India(secular)	4,914	0.00	0
Democratic Party of India (Ambedkar)	4,913	0.00	0
Rashtriya Jansangharsh Swaraj Party	4,897	0.00	0
Janta Kranti Party (Rashtravadi)	4,873	0.00	0
Aasra Lokmanch Party	4,856	0.00	0
Nationalist Janshakti Party	4,847	0.00	0
Indian Christian Front	4,832	0.00	0
Jai Jawan Jai Kisan Party	4,809	0.00	0
Atulya Bharat Party	4,737	0.00	0
Bhartiya Krishak Dal	4,696	0.00	0
The National Road Map Party of India	4,672	0.00	0
Bhartiya Amrit Party	4,632	0.00	0
Prajatantrik Samadhan Party	4,612	0.00	0
Navbharat Nirman Party	4,590	0.00	0
Manavtawadi Samaj Party	4,498	0.00	0
National Jagaran Party	4,444	0.00	0
Mithilanchal Mukti Morcha	4,413	0.00	0
Republican Party of India (Khobragade)	4,402	0.00	0
Ambedkarist Republican Party	4,399	0.00	0
Nava Samaj Party	4,286	0.00	0
Aadarsh Sangram Party	4,283	0.00	0
National Republican Congress	4,278	0.00	0
Navarang Congress Party	4,265	0.00	0
Prajaa Swaraaj Party	4,179	0.00	0
Jharkhand Anushilan Party	4,164	0.00	0
Pichhra Samaj Party	4,073	0.00	0
Manvadhikar National Party	4,071	0.00	0
Mulnibasi Party of India	4,057	0.00	0
All India Ulama Congress	4,024	0.00	0
Rashtrawadi Party of India,	4,016	0.00	0
Indian Unity Centre	4,003	0.00	0
Manuvadi Party	3,962	0.00	0
Rashtriya Lok Sarvadhikar Party	3,944	0.00	0
Social Justice Party of India	3,927	0.00	0
Rashtriya Samajwadi Party (Secular)	3,926	0.00	0
Subhashwadi Bhartiya Samajwadi Party (Subhas Party)	3,919	0.00	0
Bharat Jan Aadhar Party	3,919	0.00	0
Socialist Party (India)	3,916	0.00	0
Bhartiya Manav Samaj Party	3,908	0.00	0
Akhand Hind Party	3,907	0.00	0
National Women's Party	3,903	0.00	0
Rashtriya Sangail Party	3,895	0.00	0
Samata Kranti Dal	3,877	0.00	0
RASHTRIYA VIKLANG PARTY	3,845	0.00	0
Rashtriya Azad Manch	3,799	0.00	0
Bhartiya Kranti Vir Party	3,778	0.00	0
VANCHITSAMAJ INSAAF PARTY	3,756	0.00	0
Hindusthan Praja Paksha	3,750	0.00	0
Jan Seva Sahayak Party	3,731	0.00	0
Jan Samman party	3,706	0.00	0
Karnataka Praja Party (RaithaParva)	3,697	0.00	0
Vikas Insaf Party	3,694	0.00	0
Rashtriya Sahara Party	3,687	0.00	0
Apna Samaj Party	3,678	0.00	0
Jan Satya Path Party	3,646	0.00	0
Indian National League	3,644	0.00	0
Bhartiya Sarvodaya Party	3,638	0.00	0
Tamizhaga Murpokku Makkal Katchi	3,599	0.00	0
Adhikar Vikas Party	3,526	0.00	0
Dalit Soshit Pichhara Varg Adhikar Dal	3,522	0.00	0
Bhartiya Panchyat Party	3,449	0.00	0
Aap Aur Hum Party	3,434	0.00	0
Rashtriya Jansurajya Party	3,433	0.00	0
Adarsh Samaj Party	3,423	0.00	0
Telangana Yuva Shakti	3,407	0.00	0
Rashtriya Jankranti Party	3,405	0.00	0
New All India Congress Party	3,391	0.00	0
Pragatisheel Lok Manch	3,339	0.00	0
Desiya Uzhavar Uzhaipalar Kazhagam	3,337	0.00	0
Kisan Raksha Party,	3,303	0.00	0
Bharat Lok Sewak Party	3,271	0.00	0
Jai Maha Bharath Party	3,267	0.00	0
Rastriya Insaaf Party	3,265	0.00	0
Bhartiya Insan Party	3,264	0.00	0
Chandigarh Ki Aawaz Party	3,186	0.00	0
Rashtra Nirman Party	3,167	0.00	0
Samdarshi Samaj Party	3,139	0.00	0
Karnataka Karmikara Paksha	3,084	0.00	0
Rashtriya Mazdoor Ekta Party	3,066	0.00	0
Gorkha Rashtriya Congress	2,952	0.00	0
Samaj Bhalai Morcha	2,917	0.00	0
Makkal Sananayaga Kudiyarasu Katchi,	2,906	0.00	0
Sarvshreshth Dal	2,901	0.00	0
Bharat Rakshak Party (Democratic)	2,880	0.00	0
Yuva Vikas Party	2,858	0.00	0
Satya Kranti Party	2,857	0.00	0
National Labour Party	2,833	0.00	0
Republican Party of India (Kamble)	2,809	0.00	0
Swabhiman Party	2,805	0.00	0
Shakti Sena (Bharat Desh)	2,802	0.00	0
All India Puratchi Thalaivar Makkal Munnettra Kazhagam	2,764	0.00	0
Maharashtra Kranti Sena	2,761	0.00	0
Akhil Bhartiya Navnirman Party	2,759	0.00	0
Rashtriya Sahyog Party	2,756	0.00	0
Sabhi Jan Party	2,751	0.00	0
Loktantrik Janshakti Party	2,725	0.00	0
Rashtriya Pragati Party	2,718	0.00	0
All India Labour Party	2,707	0.00	0
Chhattisgarh Swabhiman Manch	2,691	0.00	0
Samta Vikas Party	2,688	0.00	0
Janvadi Party(Socialist)	2,640	0.00	0
Bhartiya New Sanskar Krantikari Party	2,640	0.00	0
Akhand Rashtrawadi Party	2,626	0.00	0
Naam Indiar Party	2,597	0.00	0
Indian Indira Congress (R)	2,569	0.00	0
Sunder Samaj Party	2,568	0.00	0
Sarvjan Lok Shakti Party	2,554	0.00	0
Tamil Telugu National Party	2,516	0.00	0
Kannada Chalavali Vatal Paksha	2,510	0.00	0
Bharatiya Minorities Suraksha Mahasangh	2,484	0.00	0
Jansatta Party	2,484	0.00	0
Voters Party	2,478	0.00	0
Mahamukti Dal	2,477	0.00	0
Nirbhay Bharteey Party	2,449	0.00	0
Mahasankalp Janta Party	2,427	0.00	0
Kisan Raj Party,	2,426	0.00	0
Samajwadi Samaj Party	2,417	0.00	0
Lok Chetna Dal	2,384	0.00	0
Navbharat Ekta Dal	2,371	0.00	0
Janta Raj Vikas Party	2,364	0.00	0
Adarsh Nyay Rakshak Party	2,360	0.00	0
Netaji Subhash Chander Bose Rashtriya Azad Party	2,342	0.00	0
Janta Raj Party	2,308	0.00	0
Rashtriya Bharatiya Jan Jan Party	2,291	0.00	0
Rashtriya Aamjan Party	2,272	0.00	0
Samrat Ashok Sena Party	2,214	0.00	0
Bharatiya Bahujan Samta Party	2,210	0.00	0
Svatantra Bharat Satyagrah Party	2,142	0.00	0
Hind Congress Party	2,094	0.00	0
Tripura Peoples Party	2,076	0.00	0
Swatantra Samaj Party	2,069	0.00	0
Rashtriya Janmat Party	2,058	0.00	0
Uttar Pradesh Navnirman Sena	2,051	0.00	0
Uttarakhand Pragatisheel Party	2,041	0.00	0
Sajag Samaj Party	2,041	0.00	0
All India Praja Party	2,023	0.00	0
Andaman & Nicobar Janta Party	2,017	0.00	0
Karnataka Jantha Paksha	2,013	0.00	0
Indian Rakshaka Nayakudu Party	2,012	0.00	0
All India Uzhavargal Uzhaippalargal Katchi	1,999	0.00	0
Hamro Sikkim Party	1,998	0.00	0
Bhartiya Bhaichara Party	1,995	0.00	0
Sangharsh Sena	1,987	0.00	0
Adhunik Bharat Party	1,976	0.00	0
Rashtrawadi Chetna Party	1,975	0.00	0
Rashtriya Aadarsh Member Party	1,965	0.00	0
Sanman Rajkiya Paksha	1,961	0.00	0
Bharatiya Sampuran Krantikari Party	1,948	0.00	0
Rashtriya Dal United	1,907	0.00	0
Samajwadi Jan Parishad	1,899	0.00	0
Bhartiya Harit Party	1,886	0.00	0
Bhartiya Sarvjan Hitey Samaj Party	1,852	0.00	0
Rashtriya Gondvana Party	1,850	0.00	0
All India Minorities Front	1,850	0.00	0
Bundelkhand Kranti Dal	1,849	0.00	0
Republican Bahujan Sena	1,820	0.00	0
Jan Adesh Akshuni Sena	1,812	0.00	0
Bhartiya Kisan Union Samaj Party	1,786	0.00	0
Manipur Peoples Party	1,783	0.00	0
Rashtriya Bhagidari Samaj Party	1,777	0.00	0
Republican Party of India (Reformist)	1,777	0.00	0
Rashtriya Matadata Party	1,771	0.00	0
Ahila India Dhayaga Makkal Munnetra Katchi	1,765	0.00	0
Al-Hind Party	1,764	0.00	0
Rashtriya Garib Dal	1,749	0.00	0
Vishwa Jana Party	1,726	0.00	0
Independent People’s Party	1,723	0.00	0
Pravasi Nivasi Party	1,695	0.00	0
Bharatiya Rashtravadi Samanta Party	1,695	0.00	0
Shri Janta Party	1,672	0.00	0
Mazdoor Dalit Kisaan Mahila Gareeb Party (Hindustani)	1,669	0.00	0
Telangana Communist Party of India	1,660	0.00	0
Bharatiya Peoples Party	1,649	0.00	0
Rashtriya Samrasta Party	1,648	0.00	0
Rashtriya Naujawan Dal	1,630	0.00	0
National Lokmat Party	1,628	0.00	0
Jammu & Kashmir Pir Panjal Awami Party	1,612	0.00	0
Rashtriya Jantantrik Bharat Vikas Party	1,600	0.00	0
Rashtriya Jan Adhikar Party	1,596	0.00	0
Rashtriya Bahujan Congress Party	1,574	0.00	0
Kisan Majdoor Berojgar Sangh	1,574	0.00	0
Jwala Dal	1,572	0.00	0
Akhil Bharatiya Sena	1,567	0.00	0
Andhra Rastra Praja Samithi	1,563	0.00	0
Jan Shakti Ekta Party	1,557	0.00	0
Dr. Bhimrao Ambedkar Dal	1,549	0.00	0
Rashtrawadi Shramjeevi Dal	1,548	0.00	0
Vishwa Manav Samaj Kalyan Parishad,	1,529	0.00	0
Bhartiya Azad Sena	1,527	0.00	0
Gujarat Janta Panchayat Party	1,524	0.00	0
Forward Democratic Labour Party	1,519	0.00	0
Republican Paksha (Khoripa)	1,506	0.00	0
Sikkim Republican Party	1,503	0.00	0
Praja Satta Party	1,462	0.00	0
National Bhrashtachar Mukt Party	1,453	0.00	0
Engineers Party	1,442	0.00	0
Bhapase Party	1,434	0.00	0
Hum Sabki Party	1,432	0.00	0
Jai Hind Samaj Party	1,431	0.00	0
Rastriya Aam Jan Seva Party	1,425	0.00	0
Ahinsa Samaj Party	1,424	0.00	0
Rashtriya Janvikas Party (Democratic)	1,414	0.00	0
Prism	1,400	0.00	0
Bhartiya Jan Sampark Party	1,392	0.00	0
Sabse Achchhi Party	1,360	0.00	0
Prajatantra Aadhar Party	1,346	0.00	0
Manav Kranti Party	1,344	0.00	0
Navodayam Party	1,341	0.00	0
Kalyankari Jantantrik Party	1,336	0.00	0
Rashtriya Vyapari Party	1,326	0.00	0
Yekikrutha Sankshema Rashtriya Praja Party	1,320	0.00	0
Puducherry Development Party	1,319	0.00	0
National Fifty Fifty Front	1,308	0.00	0
Shane Hind Fourm	1,306	0.00	0
Yuva Sarkar	1,296	0.00	0
Rashtra Vikas Zumbes Party	1,290	0.00	0
All Indian Rajiv Congress Party	1,282	0.00	0
Anjaan Aadmi Party	1,281	0.00	0
Ekta Samaj Party	1,270	0.00	0
Bharatiya Bahujan Parivartan Party	1,268	0.00	0
Rashtriya Janta Party	1,264	0.00	0
Andhra Chaitanya Party	1,263	0.00	0
Rashtriya Ambedkar Dal	1,258	0.00	0
Manipur Democratic Peoples's Front	1,256	0.00	0
United States of India Party	1,244	0.00	0
Jharkhand Party (Secular),	1,244	0.00	0
Rayalaseema Rashtra Samithi	1,229	0.00	0
Rashtravadi Party (Bharat)	1,225	0.00	0
Prem Janata Dal	1,223	0.00	0
Radical Democrats	1,220	0.00	0
Bhartiya Jan Samman Party	1,218	0.00	0
Karnataka Pragnyavantha Janatha Party	1,207	0.00	0
Bharatiya Prajagala Kalyana Paksha	1,184	0.00	0
Navsarjan Bharat Party	1,160	0.00	0
National Development Party	1,138	0.00	0
Navataram Party	1,135	0.00	0
Lokjagar Party	1,135	0.00	0
Makkalatchi Katchi	1,115	0.00	0
Vivasayigal Makkal Munnetra Katchi	1,108	0.00	0
Sarvjan Sewa Party	1,085	0.00	0
Bharatiya Bahujan Party	1,069	0.00	0
Rashtriya Janwadi Party (Socialist)	1,060	0.00	0
New India Party	1,059	0.00	0
Jai Swaraj Party	1,056	0.00	0
Bharatiya Jan Morcha Party	1,055	0.00	0
National Youth Party	1,053	0.00	0
Telangana Sakalajanula Party	1,048	0.00	0
Bhartiya Nojawan Dal	1,047	0.00	0
National Apni Party	1,044	0.00	0
Hindu Samaj Party	1,014	0.00	0
Bahujana Raajyam Party (Phule Ambedkar)	1,008	0.00	0
Akhil Bhartiya Ekata Party	1,006	0.00	0
Rashtriya Praja Congress (Secular)	996	0.00	0
Bharatiya Rashtravadi Paksha	992	0.00	0
Navnirman Party	985	0.00	0
Shiromani Lok Dal Party	984	0.00	0
Bhartiya Vanchitsamaj Party	984	0.00	0
Mera Adhikaar Rashtriya Dal	973	0.00	0
Ahimsa Socialist Party	972	0.00	0
Himachal Jan Kranti Party	970	0.00	0
Lok Jan Sangharsh Party	968	0.00	0
Challengers Party	958	0.00	0
Bhartiya Naujawan Inklav Party	932	0.00	0
Ambedkar Yug Party	921	0.00	0
Janapaalana Party (Democratic)	913	0.00	0
All Pensioner’s Party	892	0.00	0
National Nava Kranthi Party	887	0.00	0
Akhil Bharatiya Manavata Paksha	885	0.00	0
Saaf Party	882	0.00	0
Hamari Apni Party	847	0.00	0
Adarshwaadi Congress Party	838	0.00	0
Bharatiya Sarvodaya Kranti Party	829	0.00	0
Azad Mazdoor Kissan Party	829	0.00	0
Indian Gandhiyan Party	824	0.00	0
Bharatiya Majdoor Janta Party	822	0.00	0
The Future India Party	820	0.00	0
Raita Bharat Party	811	0.00	0
Rashtriya Nav Nirman Bharat Party	811	0.00	0
Socialist Janata Party	805	0.00	0
Rashtriya Mangalam Party	798	0.00	0
Rashtriya Janutthan Party	776	0.00	0
Ilantamilar Munnani Kazhagam	748	0.00	0
Rashtriya Janhit Sangharsh Party	747	0.00	0
Bahujan Suraksha Dal	743	0.00	0
Sarvodaya Prabhat Party	740	0.00	0
Akhil Bhartiya Sarvadharma Samaj Party	735	0.00	0
Samajtantric Party of India	730	0.00	0
Bhartiya Pragatisheel Congress	724	0.00	0
Inqalab Vikas Dal	718	0.00	0
Adim Bhartiya Dal	716	0.00	0
Jan Sangh Party	712	0.00	0
Loktantrik Rashrtavadi Party	705	0.00	0
Rashtriya Jansena Party	699	0.00	0
Jai Vijaya Bharathi Party	696	0.00	0
Punjab Labour Party	692	0.00	0
Universal Brotherhood Movement	689	0.00	0
SARVA VIKAS PARTY	688	0.00	0
Majdoor Kisan Union Party	687	0.00	0
Khusro Sena Party	687	0.00	0
B. C. United Front	649	0.00	0
Anaithu Makkal Katchi	645	0.00	0
Akila India Vallalar Peravai	643	0.00	0
National Dalitha Dhal Party	628	0.00	0
Bhartiya Navodaya Party	619	0.00	0
Sikkim United Front	614	0.00	0
Mahila & Yuva Shakti Party	605	0.00	0
Democratic Corruption Liberation Front	596	0.00	0
Rashtriya Backward Party	584	0.00	0
Fauji Janta Party	564	0.00	0
Aadarsh Janata Sewa Party	551	0.00	0
People’s Union Party	547	0.00	0
Rashtriya Jatigat Aarakshan Virodhi Party	535	0.00	0
Real Democracy Party	532	0.00	0
Swarnim Bharat Inquilab	527	0.00	0
Telangana Prajala Party	521	0.00	0
Kartavya Rashtriya Party	512	0.00	0
Akhil Bhartiya Lok Dal	503	0.00	0
Bahujan Samyak Party (Mission)	501	0.00	0
Democratic Party of India	499	0.00	0
Christian Democratic Front	494	0.00	0
Bhartiya Janta Dal	489	0.00	0
Lokpriya Samaj Party	478	0.00	0
Rashtriya Vikas Party	477	0.00	0
Rashtravadi Kranti Dal	475	0.00	0
Jai Lok Party	473	0.00	0
Bharatrashtra Democratic Party	472	0.00	0
Republican Party of India Ektavadi	463	0.00	0
Bhartiya Rashtrawadi Party	461	0.00	0
United Democratic Front Secular	451	0.00	0
Hardam Manavtawadi Rashtriya Dal	447	0.00	0
Rashtriya Ahinsa Manch	440	0.00	0
Bhartiya Janta Dal (Integrated)	435	0.00	0
Democratic Prajakranthi Party Secularist	429	0.00	0
Sanjhi Virasat Party	419	0.00	0
All Indians Party	396	0.00	0
Gareeb Aadmi Party	385	0.00	0
All Peoples Party	370	0.00	0
Rajyadhikara Party	368	0.00	0
Rashtriya Samta Vikas Party	349	0.00	0
Daksha Party	346	0.00	0
Tola Party	330	0.00	0
Corruption Abolition Party	275	0.00	0
Desh Janhit Party	273	0.00	0
Independent	16,467,341	2.69	4
None of the above	6,513,355	1.06	–
Vacant			1
Nominated Anglo-Indians			2
Total	613,146,768	100.00	545
Valid votes	613,146,768	99.92	
Invalid/blank votes	509,530	0.08	
Total votes	613,656,298	100.00	
Registered voters/turnout	910,512,091	67.40	
Source: ECI, ECI

== Results By Region ==
Region	States	Total Seats	Party	Won	Change
Northern	Jammu & Kashmir (6); Himachal Pradesh (4); Haryana (10); Punjab(13); Uttarakhand(5); Uttar Pradesh (80)	118	Bharatiya Janata Party	86	▼6
Northern	Jammu & Kashmir (6); Himachal Pradesh (4); Haryana (10); Punjab(13); Uttarakhand(5); Uttar Pradesh (80)	118	Bahujan Samaj Party	10	▲10
Northern	Jammu & Kashmir (6); Himachal Pradesh (4); Haryana (10); Punjab(13); Uttarakhand(5); Uttar Pradesh (80)	118	Indian National Congress	9	▲3
Northern	Jammu & Kashmir (6); Himachal Pradesh (4); Haryana (10); Punjab(13); Uttarakhand(5); Uttar Pradesh (80)	118	Samajwadi Party	5	Steady
Northern	Jammu & Kashmir (6); Himachal Pradesh (4); Haryana (10); Punjab(13); Uttarakhand(5); Uttar Pradesh (80)	118	Jammu & Kashmir National Conference	3	▲3
Northern	Jammu & Kashmir (6); Himachal Pradesh (4); Haryana (10); Punjab(13); Uttarakhand(5); Uttar Pradesh (80)	118	Apna Dal	2	Steady
Northern	Jammu & Kashmir (6); Himachal Pradesh (4); Haryana (10); Punjab(13); Uttarakhand(5); Uttar Pradesh (80)	118	Shiromani Akali Dal	2	▼2
Northern	Jammu & Kashmir (6); Himachal Pradesh (4); Haryana (10); Punjab(13); Uttarakhand(5); Uttar Pradesh (80)	118	Aam Aadmi Party	1	▼3
Western	Rajasthan (25); Gujarat (26); Maharashtra (48); Goa (2)	101	Bharatiya Janata Party	74	▼1
Western	Rajasthan (25); Gujarat (26); Maharashtra (48); Goa (2)	101	Shiv Sena	18	Steady
Western	Rajasthan (25); Gujarat (26); Maharashtra (48); Goa (2)	101	Nationalist Congress Party	4	Steady
Western	Rajasthan (25); Gujarat (26); Maharashtra (48); Goa (2)	101	Indian National Congress	2	▼1
Western	Rajasthan (25); Gujarat (26); Maharashtra (48); Goa (2)	101	Rashtriya Loktantrik Party	1	▲1
Western	Rajasthan (25); Gujarat (26); Maharashtra (48); Goa (2)	101	All India Majlis-e-Ittehadul Muslimeen	1	▲1
Western	Rajasthan (25); Gujarat (26); Maharashtra (48); Goa (2)	101	Independent Politician	2	▲2
Central	Madhya Pradesh (29); Chhattisgarh (11)	40	Bharatiya Janata Party	37	Steady
Central	Madhya Pradesh (29); Chhattisgarh (11)	40	Indian National Congress	3	Steady
Southern	Karnataka (28); Telangana (17); Andhra Pradesh (25); Tamil Nadu (39); Kerala (20)	129	Bharatiya Janata Party	29	▲8
Southern	Karnataka (28); Telangana (17); Andhra Pradesh (25); Tamil Nadu (39); Kerala (20)	129	Indian National Congress	27	▲8
Southern	Karnataka (28); Telangana (17); Andhra Pradesh (25); Tamil Nadu (39); Kerala (20)	129	Dravida Munnetra Kazhagam	24	▲24
Southern	Karnataka (28); Telangana (17); Andhra Pradesh (25); Tamil Nadu (39); Kerala (20)	129	YSR Congress Party	22	▲13
Southern	Karnataka (28); Telangana (17); Andhra Pradesh (25); Tamil Nadu (39); Kerala (20)	129	Bharat Rashtra Samithi	9	▼2
Southern	Karnataka (28); Telangana (17); Andhra Pradesh (25); Tamil Nadu (39); Kerala (20)	129	Telugu Desam Party	3	▼13
Southern	Karnataka (28); Telangana (17); Andhra Pradesh (25); Tamil Nadu (39); Kerala (20)	129	Communist Party of India	3	▼2
Southern	Karnataka (28); Telangana (17); Andhra Pradesh (25); Tamil Nadu (39); Kerala (20)	129	Indian Union Muslim League	3	▼1
Southern	Karnataka (28); Telangana (17); Andhra Pradesh (25); Tamil Nadu (39); Kerala (20)	129	Communist Party of India	2	▲1
Southern	Karnataka (28); Telangana (17); Andhra Pradesh (25); Tamil Nadu (39); Kerala (20)	129	All India Anna Dravida Munnetra Kazhagam	1	▼36
Southern	Karnataka (28); Telangana (17); Andhra Pradesh (25); Tamil Nadu (39); Kerala (20)	129	Viduthalai Chiruthaigal Katchi	1	▲1
Southern	Karnataka (28); Telangana (17); Andhra Pradesh (25); Tamil Nadu (39); Kerala (20)	129	All India Majlis-e-Ittehadul Muslimeen	1	Steady
Southern	Karnataka (28); Telangana (17); Andhra Pradesh (25); Tamil Nadu (39); Kerala (20)	129	Revolutionary Socialist Party	1	Steady
Southern	Karnataka (28); Telangana (17); Andhra Pradesh (25); Tamil Nadu (39); Kerala (20)	129	Kerala Congress	1	Steady
Southern	Karnataka (28); Telangana (17); Andhra Pradesh (25); Tamil Nadu (39); Kerala (20)	129	Janata Dal	1	▼1
Southern	Karnataka (28); Telangana (17); Andhra Pradesh (25); Tamil Nadu (39); Kerala (20)	129	Independent Politician	1	▼1
Eastern	Bihar (40); Jharkhand (14); Odisha (21); West Bengal (42)	117	Bharatiya Janata Party	54	▲17
Eastern	Bihar (40); Jharkhand (14); Odisha (21); West Bengal (42)	117	All India Trinamool Congress	22	▼12
Eastern	Bihar (40); Jharkhand (14); Odisha (21); West Bengal (42)	117	Janata Dal	16	▲14
Eastern	Bihar (40); Jharkhand (14); Odisha (21); West Bengal (42)	117	Biju Janata Dal	12	▼8
Eastern	Bihar (40); Jharkhand (14); Odisha (21); West Bengal (42)	117	Lok Janshakti Party	6	Steady
Eastern	Bihar (40); Jharkhand (14); Odisha (21); West Bengal (42)	117	Indian National Congress	5	▼1
Eastern	Bihar (40); Jharkhand (14); Odisha (21); West Bengal (42)	117	All Jharkhand Students Union	1	▲1
Eastern	Bihar (40); Jharkhand (14); Odisha (21); West Bengal (42)	117	Jharkhand Mukti Morcha	1	▼1
North-East	Assam (14); Arunachal Pradesh (2); Meghalaya (2); Manipur (2); Mizoram (1); Nagaland(1); Sikkim(1); Tripura (2)	25	Bharatiya Janata Party	14	▲6
North-East	Assam (14); Arunachal Pradesh (2); Meghalaya (2); Manipur (2); Mizoram (1); Nagaland(1); Sikkim(1); Tripura (2)	25	Indian National Congress	4	▼4
North-East	Assam (14); Arunachal Pradesh (2); Meghalaya (2); Manipur (2); Mizoram (1); Nagaland(1); Sikkim(1); Tripura (2)	25	All India United Democratic Front	1	▼2
North-East	Assam (14); Arunachal Pradesh (2); Meghalaya (2); Manipur (2); Mizoram (1); Nagaland(1); Sikkim(1); Tripura (2)	25	National People's Party	1	Steady
North-East	Assam (14); Arunachal Pradesh (2); Meghalaya (2); Manipur (2); Mizoram (1); Nagaland(1); Sikkim(1); Tripura (2)	25	Naga People's Front	1	Steady
North-East	Assam (14); Arunachal Pradesh (2); Meghalaya (2); Manipur (2); Mizoram (1); Nagaland(1); Sikkim(1); Tripura (2)	25	Mizo National Front	1	▲1
North-East	Assam (14); Arunachal Pradesh (2); Meghalaya (2); Manipur (2); Mizoram (1); Nagaland(1); Sikkim(1); Tripura (2)	25	Sikkim Krantikari Morcha	1	▲1
North-East	Assam (14); Arunachal Pradesh (2); Meghalaya (2); Manipur (2); Mizoram (1); Nagaland(1); Sikkim(1); Tripura (2)	25	Nationalist Democratic Progressive Party	1	▲1
North-East	Assam (14); Arunachal Pradesh (2); Meghalaya (2); Manipur (2); Mizoram (1); Nagaland(1); Sikkim(1); Tripura (2)	25	Independent politician	1	Steady
Union Territories	Chandigarh (1); Delhi (7); Dadra & Nagar Haveli (1); Daman & Diu (1); Lakshadweep (1); Puducherry (1); Andaman & Nicobar(1)	13	Bharatiya Janata Party	9	▼2
Union Territories	Chandigarh (1); Delhi (7); Dadra & Nagar Haveli (1); Daman & Diu (1); Lakshadweep (1); Puducherry (1); Andaman & Nicobar(1)	13	Indian National Congress	2	▲2
Union Territories	Chandigarh (1); Delhi (7); Dadra & Nagar Haveli (1); Daman & Diu (1); Lakshadweep (1); Puducherry (1); Andaman & Nicobar(1)	13	Nationalist Congress Party	1	Steady
Union Territories	Chandigarh (1); Delhi (7); Dadra & Nagar Haveli (1); Daman & Diu (1); Lakshadweep (1); Puducherry (1); Andaman & Nicobar(1)	13	Independent politician	1	▲1
Total	29 States and 7 UT	543			

== Results by State and UT ==
=== Andaman and Nicobar Islands (1) ===
INC (1)

Party Name	Popular vote			Seats		
Party Name	Votes	%	±pp	Contested	Won	+/−
INC	95,308	45.95	▲2.26	1	1	▲1
BJP	93,901	45.28	▼2.52	1	0	▼1
AAP	2,839	1.37	▼0.59	1	0	Steady
Total	2,07,296	100%	-	15	1	-

=== Chandigarh (1) ===
BJP (1)

Name of Party	Vote Share %	Change	Seats won	Changes
Bharatiya Janata Party	50.64%	+8.4	1	Steady
Indian National Congress	40.35%	+13.55	0	Steady
Aam Aadmi Party	3.02%	−18	0	Steady

=== Dadra and Nagar Haveli (1) ===
IND (1)

Name of Party	Vote Share %	Change	Seats won	Changes
Bharatiya Janata Party	40.92%	−7.98	0	▼1
Independent	45.44%	New	1	▲1

=== Daman and Diu (1) ===
BJP (1)

Name of Party	Vote Share %	Change	Seats won	Changes
Bharatiya Janata Party	42.98%	−10.82	1	Steady
Indian National Congress	31.62%	−11.68	0	Steady

=== NCT of Delhi (7) ===
BJP (7)

Name of Party	Vote Share %	Change	Seats won	Changes
Bharatiya Janata Party	56.56%	+10.16	7	Steady
Indian National Congress	22.51%	+7.41	0	Steady
Aam Aadmi Party	18.11%	−16.79	0	Steady

=== Lakshadweep (1) ===
NCP (1)

Name of Party	Vote Share %	Change	Seats won	Changes
Nationalist Congress Party	48.61%	−1.49	1	Steady
Indian National Congress	46.86%	+0.26	0	Steady

=== Puducherry (1) ===
INC (1)

Name of Party	Vote Share %	Change	Seats won	Changes
Indian National Congress	56.27%	+29.97	1	▲1
All India N.R. Congress (NDA)	31.36%	−3.24	0	▼1

=== Andhra Pradesh (25) ===
YSRCP (22)	TDP (3)

Party	Seats			Popular vote (Note: Compared to the results in post-split Andhra Pradesh constituencies only.)		
Party	Contested	Won	+/−	Votes	%	±pp
YSR Congress Party	25	22	▲14	15,537,006	49.89	▲4.22
Telugu Desam Party	25	3	▼12	12,515,345	40.19	▼0.61
Jana Sena Party	18	0	Steady	1,829,346	5.87	New
Indian National Congress	25	0	Steady	406,977	1.31	▼1.55
Bharatiya Janata Party	25	0	▼2	303,985	0.98	▼6.24
Total (valid votes)	–	25	–	31,143,712	100.0	Steady
Registered voters / Turnout	–	–	–	39,405,967	80.22	▲2.01

=== Arunachal Pradesh (2) ===
BJP (2)

Name of Party	Vote Share %	Change	Seats won	Changes
Bharatiya Janata Party	58.22%	+10.42	2	▲1
Indian National Congress	20.69%	−23.01	0	▼1

=== Assam (14) ===
BJP (9)	INC (3)	AIUDF (1)	IND (1)

Alliance/Party			Seats			Popular vote		
Alliance/Party			Contested	Won	+/−	Votes	%	±pp
	NDA	BJP	10	9	▲2	64,84,596	36.41%	▼0.09
	NDA	AGP	3	0	Steady	14,80,697	8.31%	▲4.51
	NDA	BPF	1	0	Steady	4,46,774	2.5%	▲0.29
	NDA	Total	14	9	▲2	84,12,067	46.78%	-
	UPA	INC	14	3	Steady	63,73,659	35.79%	▲6.19
-	-	AIUDF	3	1	▼2	14,02,088	7.87%	▼6.93
-	-	IND	14	1	Steady	4,84,560	4.3	▼5.32

=== Bihar (40) ===
BJP (17)	JDU (16)	LJP (6)	INC (1)

Alliance/ Party		Popular vote			Seats		
Alliance/ Party		Votes	%	±pp	Contested	Won	+/−
NDA	BJP	96,19,458	24.05%	▼5.82	17	17	▼5
NDA	JD(U)	89,02,719	22.26%	▲6.22	17	16	▲14
NDA	LJP	32,06,979	8.01%	▲1.51	6	6	Steady
NDA	Total	21,729,156	54.32%		40	39	
UPA	RJD	62,70,769	15.68%	▼4.78	19	0	▼4
UPA	INC	31,40,797	7.85%	▼0.71	9	1	▼1
UPA	RLSP	14,62,518	3.66%	▲0.66	5	0	▼3
UPA	VIP	6,60,706	1.66%	New	4	0	Steady
UPA	HAM	9,56,501	2.39%	New	3	0	Steady
UPA	CPI(ML)L	4,19,195	1.04%	Steady	1	0	Steady
UPA	Total	12,910,486	32.46%		40	1	
IND		2,227,705	5.57%	Steady	Steady	0	Steady
NOTA		816,950	2.04%	Steady			
Total		3,99,89,711	100%	Steady	Steady	40	Steady

=== Chhattisgarh (11) ===
BJP (9)	INC (2)

Parties and coalitions	Seats			Popular vote		
Parties and coalitions	Contested	Won	+/−	Votes	%	±pp
Bharatiya Janata Party	11	9	▼1	69,02,477	51.44%	▲1.79%
Indian National Congress	11	2	▲1	55,69,283	41.51%	▲2.42%
Bahujan Samaj Party	11	0	Steady	3,13,261	2.33%	▼0.31%
Total	11			1,34,18,288		
Valid votes	1,34,18,288	98.55				
Votes cast / turnout	1,36,14,553	73.79				
Registered voters	1,84,50,225	100.0				

=== Goa (2) ===
BJP (1)	INC (1)

Party Name	Seats			Popular vote		
Party Name	Contested	Won	+/−	Votes	%	±pp
BJP	2	1	▼1	4,36,650	51.18	▼2.27
INC	2	1	▲1	3,66,158	42.92	▲6.35
AAP	2	0	Steady	25,647	3.01	▼0.31
Total	12	2	-	8,53,203	100%	-

=== Gujarat (26) ===
BJP (26)

Party Name	Seats			Popular vote		
Party Name	Contested	Won	+/−	Votes	%	±pp
BJP	26	26	Steady	1,80,91,275	62.21	▲3.16
INC	26	0	Steady	93,37,084	32.11	▼0.75
Others	122	0	Steady	6,26,044	2.15	Steady
IND	197	0	Steady	6,26,629	2.15	▲0.07
NOTA				4,00,932	1.38	▼0.34
Total	371	26	-	2,90,81,964	100%	-

=== Haryana (10) ===
BJP (10)

Parties and coalitions	Seats			Popular vote		
Parties and coalitions	Contested	Won	+/−	Votes	%	±pp
Bharatiya Janata Party	10	10	▲3	73,57,347	58.21	▲23.51
Indian National Congress	10	0	▼1	36,04,106	28.51	▲5.61
Jannayak Janata Party	7	0	New	6,19,970	4.9	New
Bahujan Samaj Party	8	0	Steady	4,61,273	3.65	▼0.95
Indian National Lok Dal	10	0	▼2	2,40,258	1.9	▼22.5
Total		10		1,26,39,755	100.0	

=== Himachal Pradesh (4) ===
BJP (4)

Party Name	Popular vote			Seats		
Party Name	Votes	%	±pp	Contested	Won	+/−
BJP	2,661,281	69.11	▲15.76	4	4	Steady
INC	1,051,113	27.30	▼13.38	4	0	Steady
Others	69,620	1.65	Steady	19	0	Steady
IND	35,710	0.93	▲0.01	18	0	Steady
NOTA	33,008	0.86	▼0.08			
Total	3,850,732	100	-	45	4	-

=== Jammu and Kashmir (6) ===
BJP (3)	JKNC (3)

Party Name	Popular vote			Seats		
Party Name	Votes	%	±pp	Contested	Won	+/−
BJP	1,648,041	46.39	▲14.03	6	3	Steady
INC	1,011,527	28.47	▲5.62	5	0	Steady
JKNC	280,356	7.89	▼3.23	3	3	▲3
JKPC	133,612	3.76	Steady	3	0	Steady
JKPDP	120,754	3.40	▼17.14	3	0	▼3
Others	110,354	3.11	Steady	23	0	Steady
IND	226,239	6.37	▲0.10	36	0	Steady
NOTA	21,739	0.61	▼0.27			
Total	3,552,622	100	-	79	6	-

=== Jharkhand (14) ===
BJP (11)	AJSU (1)	INC (1)	JMM (1)

Alliance / Party		Popular vote			Seats		
Alliance / Party		Votes	%	±pp	Contested	Won	+/−
NDA	BJP	76,23,987	50.96	▲10.86	13	11	▼1
NDA	AJSU	6,48,277	4.33	▲0.53	1	1	▲1
NDA	Total	82,72,264	55.29	Steady	14	12	Steady
UPA	INC	23,38,466	15.63	▲2.13	7	1	▲1
UPA	JMM	17,22,635	11.51	▲2.11	4	1	▼1
UPA	JVM(P)	7,50,799	5.02	▼7.28	2	0	Steady
UPA	RJD	3,61,478	2.42	▲0.72	1 + 1	0	Steady
UPA	Total	51,73,378	34.58	Steady	14 + 1	2	Steady
Others		7,05,704	4.71	Steady	105	0	Steady
IND		6,21,247	4.15	Steady	95	0	Steady
NOTA		1,89,365	1.27	Steady			
Total		1,49,61,958	100%	-	243	14	-

=== Karnataka (28) ===
BJP (25)	INC (1)	JDS (1)	IND (1)

Alliance/ Party		Popular vote			Seats		
Alliance/ Party		Votes	%	±pp	Contested	Won	+/−
NDA	BJP	1,80,53,454	51.38	▲8.38	27	25	▲8
NDA	IND	7,03,660	2.00	Steady	1	1	▲1
NDA	Total	1,87,57,114	53.38	Steady	28	26	Steady
UPA	INC	1,12,03,016	31.88	▼8.92	21	1	▼8
UPA	JD(S)	33,97,229	9.67	▼1.33	7	1	▼1
UPA	Total	1,46,00,245	41.55	Steady	28	2	Steady
Others		8,66,332	2.47	Steady	158	0	Steady
IND		6,64,181	1.89	Steady	265	0	Steady
NOTA		2,50,810	0.71	Steady			
Total		3,51,38,682	100%	-	507	28	-

=== Kerala (20) ===
INC (15)	IUML (2)	CPI M (1)	KCM (1)	RSP (1)

Alliance/Party		Popular vote			Seats		
Alliance/Party		Votes	%	±pp	Contested	Won	+/−
UDF	INC	7,596,610	37.46%	▲6.36%	16	15	▲7
UDF	IUML	1,111,697	5.48%	▲0.94%	2	2	Steady
UDF	RSP	499,677	2.46%	▲0.19%	1	1	Steady
UDF	KEC(M)	421,046	2.08%	▼0.28%	1	1	Steady
UDF	Total	9,629,030	47.48 %	▲5.50%	20	19	▲7
LDF	CPI(M)	5,266,510	25.97%	▲4.38%	14	1	▼4
LDF	CPI	1,233,886	6.08%	▼1.51%	4	0	▼1
LDF	LDF Ind.	655,991	4.24%	▼5.01%	2	0	▼2
LDF	Total	7,156,387	36.29%	▼3.83%	20	1	▼7
NDA	BJP	2,635,810	13.00%	▲2.67%	15	0	Steady
NDA	BDJS	380,847	1.88%	New	4	0	Steady
NDA	KC (T)	155,135	0.76%	New	1	0	Steady
NDA	Total	3,171,792	15.64%	▲4.82%	20	0	Steady
Total		20,397,168	100%	▲3.95%		20	

=== Madhya Pradesh (29) ===
BJP (28)	INC (1)

Party Name	Popular vote			Seats		
Party Name	Votes	%	±pp	Contested	Won	+/−
BJP	2,14,06,911	58.00		29	28	
INC	1,27,33,074	34.50		29	1	
BSP	8,78,013	2.38		25	0	
SP	82,662	0.22		2	0	
Others	7,69,818	2.09	Steady	176	0	Steady
IND	7,02,229	1.90		178	0	Steady
NOTA	3,40,984	0.92	Steady	29	Steady	Steady
Total	3,69,10,610	100%	-	439	29	-

=== Maharashtra (48) ===
BJP (23)	SHS (18)	INC (1)	NCP (4)	AIMIM (1)	IND (1)

Parties and coalitions	Seats			Popular vote		
Parties and coalitions	Contested	Won	+/−	Votes	%	±pp
Bharatiya Janata Party	25	23	Steady	14,912,139	27.84%	▲0.28%
Shiv Sena	23	18	Steady	12,589,064	23.5%	▲2.68%
Nationalist Congress Party	19	4	Steady	8,387,363	15.66%	▼0.45%
Indian National Congress	25	1	▼1	8,792,237	16.41%	▼1.88%
AIMIM	1	1	▲1	389,042	0.73%	New
Vanchit Bahujan Aaghadi	47	0	Steady	3,743,560	6.92%	New
Independents		1	▲1	1,992,817	3.72%	▲0.44%
NOTA	48	-	-	488,766	0.91%	-
Total	48			5,35,65,479		
Valid votes	5,35,65,479	99.09				
Votes cast / turnout	5,40,54,245	60.95				
Registered voters	8,86,76,946	100.0				

=== Manipur (2) ===
BJP (1)	NPF (1)

Party Name	Popular vote			Seats		
Party Name	Votes	%	±pp	Contested	Won	+/−
BJP	5,53,377	34.22	▲22.31	2	1	▲1
INC	3,98,387	24.63	▼17.06	2	0	▼2
NPF	3,63,527	22.48	▲2.58	1	1	▲1
CPI	1,33,813	8.27	▼5.71	1	0	Steady
Others	77,272	4.78	Steady	8	0	Steady
IND	85,565	5.29	▲2.25	5	0	Steady
NOTA	5,389	0.33	▼0.02	2	Steady	Steady
Total	16,17,330	100%	-	19	2	-

=== Meghalaya (2) ===
NPP (1)	INC (1)

Party Name	Popular vote			Seats		
Party Name	Votes	%	±pp	Contested	Won	+/−
INC	6,60,114	48.28	▲10.35	2	1	Steady
NPEP	3,04,455	22.27	▲0.07	1	1	Steady
UDP	2,67,256	19.55	▲9.64	1	0	Steady
BJP	1,08,390	7.93	▼0.97	2	0	Steady
IND	16,142	1.18	▼15.58	3	0	Steady
NOTA	10,874	0.80	▼2.00			
Total	13,67,231	100%	-	9	2	-

=== Mizoram (1) ===
MNF (1)

Name of Party	Vote Share %	Change	Seats won	Changes
Mizo National Front(NDA)	44.89%	+44.89	1	▲1
Indian National Congress	43.26	-5.33	0	▼1

=== Nagaland (1) ===
NDPP (1)

Name of Party	Vote Share %	Change	Seats won	Changes
Nationalist Democratic Progressive Party (NDA)	49.73%	New	1	▲1
Indian National Congress	48.11%	+18.01	0	Steady

=== Odisha (21) ===
BJD (12)	BJP (8)	INC (1)
BJD	BJP	INC

Alliance/ Party		Popular vote			Seats		
Alliance/ Party		Votes	%	±pp	Contested	Won	+/−
BJD		1,01,74,021	43.32	▼0.76	21	12	▼8
BJP		91,30,768	38.88	▲17.33	21	8	▲7
UPA	INC	32,85,339	13.99	▼11.98	18	1	▲1
UPA	JMM	1,35,552	0.58	▼0.22	1	0	Steady
UPA	CPI	59,978	0.26	▼0.04	1	0	Steady
UPA	CPI(M)	23,026	0.09	▼0.15	1	0	Steady
UPA	Total	35,03,895	14.92	Steady	21	1	Steady
Others		5,14,278	2.20	Steady	75	0	Steady
IND		1,60,336	0.68	▼0.87	31	0	Steady
NOTA		3,10,824	1.32	Steady			
Total		2,34,83,298	100%	-	169	21	-

=== Punjab (13) ===
BJP (2)	INC (8)	AAP (1)	SAD (2)

Alliance/ Party		Popular vote			Seats		
Alliance/ Party		Votes	%	±pp	Contested	Won	+/−
INC		5,523,066	40.12	▲7.02	13	8	▲5
NDA	SAD	3,778,574	27.54	▲1.24	10	2	▼2
NDA	BJP	1,325,445	9.63	▲0.93	3	2	Steady
NDA	Total	5,104,019	37.17	▲2.18	13	4	▼2
AAP		1,015,773	7.38	▼17.02	13	1	▼3
PDA	BSP	479,788	3.49	Steady	3	0	Steady
PDA	LIP	469,784	3.41	Steady	3	0	Steady
PDA	PEP	296,620	2.15	Steady	3	0	Steady
PDA	NPP	161,645	1.17	Steady	1	0	Steady
PDA	CPI	42,463	0.30	Steady	2	0	Steady
PDA	RMP	15,274	0.11	Steady	1	0	Steady
PDA	Total	1,465,574	10.65	Steady	13	0	Steady
SAD(A)		52,185	0.38	Steady	2	0	Steady
Others		215,286	1.56	Steady	101	0	Steady
IND		235,106	1.71	Steady	123	0	Steady
NOTA		154,423	1.12	Steady			
Total		13,765,432	100%	-	278	13	-

=== Rajasthan (25) ===
BJP (24)	RLP (1)

Alliance/ Party		Popular vote			Seats		
Alliance/ Party		Votes	%	±pp	Contested	Won	+/−
NDA	BJP	1,89,68,392	58.47	▲3.53	24	24	▼1
NDA	RLP	6,60,051	2.03	New entry	1	1	▲1
NDA	Total	1,96,28,443	60.50	▲5.56	25	25	Steady
INC		1,11,07,910	34.24	▲3.88	25	0	Steady
BSP		3,48,678	1.07	▼1.27	20	0	Steady
Others		6,80,890	2.11	Steady	68	0	Steady
IND		3,47,584	1.07	▼5.59	111	0	Steady
NOTA		3,27,559	1.01	▼0.20	25	Steady	Steady
Total		3,24,41,064	100%	-	274	25	-

=== Sikkim (1) ===
SKM (1)

Name of Party	Vote Share %	Change	Seats won	Changes
Sikkim Krantikari Morcha	47.46%	+7.96	1	▲1
Sikkim Democratic Front	43.92%	−9.08	0	▼1

=== Tamil Nadu (39) ===
DMK (24)	INC (8)	CPM (2)	AIDMK(1)	CPI (2)	VCK (1)	IUML (1)

Alliance/ Party		Popular vote			Seats		
Alliance/ Party		Votes	%	±pp	Contested	Won	+/−
SPA	DMK (Note: Since VCK, IJK, MDMK, and KMDK contested on the DMK's "Rising Sun" symbol, they will be officially recognized as DMK candidates by the ECI in affidavits, and will represent the DMK in Parliament. The DMK contested 20 seats, and including these allies, the total rises to 24.)	1,43,63,332 (Note: DMK (1,19,30,166); IJK (6,83,697); MDMK (5,63,591); KMDK (6,26,293); VCK (5,59,585))	33.10 (Note: DMK (27.49%); IJK (1.58%); MDMK (1.30%); KMDK (1.44%); VCK (1.29%))	▲9.19	24 (Note: DMK (20); IJK (1); MDMK (1); KMDK (1); VCK (1))	24	▲24
SPA	INC	54,05,674	12.46	▲8.09	9	8	▲8
SPA	CPI	10,31,617	2.38	▲1.83	2	2	▲2
SPA	CPI(M)	10,19,003	2.35	▲1.80	2	2	▲2
SPA	VCK	5,00,229	1.15	▼0.36	1	1	▲1
SPA	IUML	4,69,943	1.08	▲0.57	1	1	▲1
SPA	Total	2,27,89,798	52.52	▲16.33	39	38	▲38
NDA	ADMK (Note: Since PNK and PT contested on the AIADMK's "Two Leaves" symbol, they will be officially recognized as AIADMK candidates by the ECI in affidavits. The AIADMK contested 20 seats, and including these allies, the total rises to 22.)	83,07,345 (Note: AIADMK (74,74,757); PNK (4,77,199); PT (3,55,389))	19.14 (Note: AIADMK (17.23%); PNK (1.10%); PT (0.82%))	▼24.93	22 (Note: AIADMK (20); PNK (1); PT (1))	1	▼36
NDA	PMK	22,97,431	5.29	▲0.78	7	0	▼1
NDA	BJP	15,51,924	3.58	▼1.98	5	0	▼1
NDA	DMDK	9,29,590	2.14	▼3.05	4	0	Steady
NDA	TMC(M)	2,20,849	0.51	New entry	1	0	Steady
NDA	Total	1,33,07,139	30.67	▼29.51	39	1	▼38
AMMK+	AMMK (Note: AMMK fielded its candidates as Independents under the “Gift Pack” symbol in 38 constituencies and its ally SDPI, contested one constituency under the same symbol.)	22,06,108	5.08		38	0	
AMMK+	SDPI	23,741	0.05		1	0	
AMMK+	Total	22,29,849	5.13		39	0	
NTK		16,72,217	3.85	Steady	38	0	Steady
MNM		15,75,640	3.63		36	0	Steady
Others		3,61,596	0.83	Steady	135	0	Steady
IND		9,06,846	2.09	Steady	524	0	Steady
NOTA		5,50,577	1.27	Steady			
Total		4,33,92,884	100%	-	850	39	-

=== Telangana (17) ===
TRS (9)	BJP (4)	INC (3)	AIMIM (1)

Parties and coalitions	Seats			Popular vote		
Parties and coalitions	Contested	Won	+/−	Votes	%	±pp (Note: Compared to the results in post-split Telangana constituencies only.)
Bharat Rashtra Samithi	17	9	▼2	76,96,848	41.71	▲6.77
Indian National Congress	17	3	▲1	54,96,686	29.79	▲5.11
Bharatiya Janata Party	17	4	▲3	36,26,173	19.65	▲9.19
All India Majlis-E-Ittehadul Muslimeen	1	1	Steady	5,17,471	2.80	▼0.73
Total	17			1,84,52,097		
Valid votes	1,84,52,097	98.55				
Votes cast / turnout	1,86,42,895	62.75				
Registered voters	2,97,08,615	100.0				
Source: eci.gov.in

=== Tripura (2) ===
BJP (2)

Party Name	Popular vote			Seats		
Party Name	Votes	%	±pp	Contested	Won	+/−
BJP	10,55,658	49.03	▲43.33	2	2	▲2
INC	5,45,679	25.34	▲10.14	2	0	Steady
CPI(M)	3,72,789	17.31	▼46.70	2	0	▼2
IPFT	89,529	4.16	Steady	2	0	Steady
AITC	8,613	0.40	▼9.22	1	0	Steady
Others	23,442	2.32	Steady	5	0	Steady
IND	34,288	0.36	▼0.52	9	0	Steady
NOTA	23,174	1.08	Steady	2	Steady	Steady
Total	21,53,172	100%	-	23	2	-

=== Uttar Pradesh (80) ===
BJP (62)	ADS (2)	BSP (10)	SP (5)	INC (1)

Alliance/Party		Seats			Popular vote		
Alliance/Party		Contested	Won	+/−	Votes	%	±pp
NDA	Bharatiya Janata Party	78	62	▼9	4,28,58,171	49.98%	▲7.35%
NDA	Apna Dal (Sonelal)	2	2	Steady	10,39,478	1.21%	▲0.2
NDA	Total	80	64	▼9	4,38,97,649	51.19%	▲7.55%
Mahagathbandhan	Bahujan Samaj Party	38	10	▲10	1,66,59,754	19.43%	▼0.34
Mahagathbandhan	Samajwadi Party	37	5	Steady	1,55,33,620	18.11%	▼4.24
Mahagathbandhan	Rashtriya Lok Dal	3	0	Steady	14,47,363	1.69%	▼0.83
Mahagathbandhan	Total	78	15	▲10	3,36,40,737	39.23%	▼5.41%
UPA	Indian National Congress	67	1	▼1	54,57,352	6.36%	▼1.17

=== Uttarakhand (5) ===
BJP (5)

Party Name	Popular vote			Seats		
Party Name	Votes	%	±pp	Contested	Won	+/−
BJP	29,54,833	61.01	▲5.69	5	5	Steady
INC	15,20,767	31.40	▼2.63	5	0	Steady
BSP	2,16,755	4.48		4	0	Steady
Others	51,621	1.07	Steady	21	0	Steady
IND	48,003	0.99	▼0.74	17	0	Steady
NOTA	50,946	1.05	▼0.04			
Total	48,42,925	100%	-	52	5	-

=== West Bengal (42) ===
AITC (22)	BJP (18)	INC (2)

Parties/ Alliance		Seats			Popular vote		
Parties/ Alliance		Contested	Won	+/−	Votes	%	±pp
AITC		42	22	▼12	24,756,985	43.7%	▲4.64%
BJP		42	18	▲16	23,028,343	40.6%	▲22.2%
LF							
LF	CPI(M)	31	0	▼2	3,594,283	6.3%	▼
LF	AIFB	3	0	Steady	239,218	0.4%	▼
LF	RSP	4	0	Steady	2,08,275	0.4%	▼
LF	CPI	3	0	Steady	2,27,695	0.4%	▼
LF	Total	41	0	▼2	4,269,471	7.5%	▼16.72%
INC		40	2	▼2	3,210,485	5.7%	▼4.09%
Total		42			57,206,313	100%	

== Seats won by and valid votes polled for each party, by state ==
Based on the published data from the Election Commission of India (ECI) website.

Party name	Party Type	State Name	Total Valid Votes Polled In State	Total Electors In The State	Seat Won	Total Valid Votes Polled By Party	Percentage(%) Of Valid Votes Polled By Party
Bharatiya Janata Party	N	Arunachal Pradesh	652091	803563	2	379679	58.22
Bharatiya Janata Party	N	Assam	17986066	22050059	9	6484596	36.05
Bharatiya Janata Party	N	Bihar	40806661	71216290	17	9619548	23.57
Bharatiya Janata Party	N	Goa	853203	1136113	1	436650	51.18
Bharatiya Janata Party	N	Gujarat	29081964	45152373	26	18091275	62.21
Bharatiya Janata Party	N	Haryana	12681536	18057010	10	7357347	58.02
Bharatiya Janata Party	N	Himachal Pradesh	3850732	5330154	4	2661281	69.11
Bharatiya Janata Party	N	Jammu & Kashmir	3552622	7922538	3	1648041	46.39
Bharatiya Janata Party	N	Karnataka	35138682	51094530	25	18053454	51.38
Bharatiya Janata Party	N	Madhya Pradesh	36910610	51867474	28	21406911	58
Bharatiya Janata Party	N	Maharashtra	54054245	88676946	23	14912139	27.59
Bharatiya Janata Party	N	Manipur	1617330	1959563	1	553377	34.22
Bharatiya Janata Party	N	Odisha	23794122	32497762	8	9130768	38.37
Bharatiya Janata Party	N	Punjab	13765432	20892673	2	1325445	9.63
Bharatiya Janata Party	N	Rajasthan	32441064	48955813	24	18968392	58.47
Bharatiya Janata Party	N	Tripura	2153172	2614718	2	1055658	49.03
Bharatiya Janata Party	N	Uttar Pradesh	86481398	146134603	62	42858171	49.56
Bharatiya Janata Party	N	West Bengal	57206976	70001284	18	23028517	40.25
Bharatiya Janata Party	N	Chhattisgarh	13614453	19016462	9	6902477	50.7
Bharatiya Janata Party	N	Jharkhand	14961958	22404856	11	7623987	50.96
Bharatiya Janata Party	N	Uttarakhand	4842925	7856318	5	2954833	61.01
Bharatiya Janata Party	N	Telangana	18642895	29708615	4	3626173	19.45
Bharatiya Janata Party	N	Chandigarh	456568	646729	1	231188	50.64
Bharatiya Janata Party	N	Daman & Diu	87469	121740	1	37597	42.98
Bharatiya Janata Party	N	NCT OF Delhi	8679012	14327649	7	4908541	56.56
Indian National Congress	N	Assam	17986066	22050059	3	6373659	35.44
Indian National Congress	N	Bihar	40806661	71216290	1	3140797	7.7
Indian National Congress	N	Goa	853203	1136113	1	366158	42.92
Indian National Congress	N	Karnataka	35138682	51094530	1	11203016	31.88
Indian National Congress	N	Kerala	20385216	26204836	15	7596610	37.27
Indian National Congress	N	Madhya Pradesh	36910610	51867474	1	12733074	34.5
Indian National Congress	N	Maharashtra	54054245	88676946	1	8792237	16.27
Indian National Congress	N	Meghalaya	1367231	1914796	1	660114	48.28
Indian National Congress	N	Odisha	23794122	32497762	1	3285339	13.81
Indian National Congress	N	Punjab	13765432	20892673	8	5523066	40.12
Indian National Congress	N	Tamil Nadu	42366829	58503189	8	5405674	12.76
Indian National Congress	N	Uttar Pradesh	86481398	146134603	1	5457352	6.31
Indian National Congress	N	West Bengal	57206976	70001284	2	3210491	5.61
Indian National Congress	N	Chhattisgarh	13614453	19016462	2	5569183	40.91
Indian National Congress	N	Jharkhand	14961958	22404856	1	2338466	15.63
Indian National Congress	N	Telangana	18642895	29708615	3	5496686	29.48
Indian National Congress	N	Andaman & Nicobar Islands	207296	318471	1	95308	45.98
Indian National Congress	N	Puducherry	790760	973410	1	444981	56.27
Communist Party of India (Marxist)	N	Kerala	20385216	26204836	1	5266510	25.83
Communist Party of India (Marxist)	N	Tamil Nadu	42366829	58503189	2	1018225	2.4
Nationalist Congress Party	N	Maharashtra	54054245	88676946	4	8387363	15.52
Nationalist Congress Party	N	Lakshadweep	47009	55189	1	22851	48.61
Communist Party of India	N	Tamil Nadu	42366829	58503189	2	1031617	2.43
Bahujan Samaj Party	N	Uttar Pradesh	86481398	146134603	10	16659754	19.26
All India Trinamool Congress	N	West Bengal	57206976	70001284	22	24757345	43.28
Telugu Desam	S	Andhra Pradesh	31612534	39405967	3	12515345	39.59
Yuvajana Sramika Rythu Congress Party	S	Andhra Pradesh	31612534	39405967	22	15537006	49.15
All India United Democratic Front	S	Assam	17986066	22050059	1	1402088	7.8
Lok Jan Shakti Party	S	Bihar	40806661	71216290	6	3206979	7.86
Janata Dal (United)	S	Bihar	40806661	71216290	16	8902719	21.82
Jammu & Kashmir National Conference	S	Jammu & Kashmir	3552622	7922538	3	280356	7.89
Janata Dal (Secular)	S	Karnataka	35138682	51094530	1	3397229	9.67
Revolutionary Socialist Party	S	Kerala	20385216	26204836	1	499677	2.45
Kerala Congress (M)	S	Kerala	20385216	26204836	1	421046	2.07
Indian Union Muslim League	S	Kerala	20385216	26204836	2	1111697	5.45
Indian Union Muslim League	S	Tamil Nadu	42366829	58503189	1	469943	1.11
All India Majlis-E-Ittehadul Muslimeen	S	Maharashtra	54054245	88676946	1	389042	0.72
All India Majlis-E-Ittehadul Muslimeen	S	Telangana	18642895	29708615	1	517471	2.78
Shivsena	S	Maharashtra	54054245	88676946	18	12589064	23.29
Naga Peoples Front	S	Manipur	1617330	1959563	1	363527	22.48
National People's Party	S	Meghalaya	1367231	1914796	1	304455	22.27
Mizo National Front	S	Mizoram	499621	792464	1	224286	44.89
Nationalist Democratic Progressive Party	S	Nagaland	1006357	1213777	1	500510	49.73
Biju Janata Dal	S	Odisha	23794122	32497762	12	10174021	42.76
Shiromani Akali Dal	S	Punjab	13765432	20892673	2	3778574	27.45
Aam Aadmi Party	S	Punjab	13765432	20892673	1	1015773	7.38
Sikkim Krantikari Morcha	S	Sikkim	351746	434128	1	166922	47.46
Dravida Munnetra Kazhagam	S	Tamil Nadu	42366829	58503189	23	13877992	32.76
All India Anna Dravida Munnetra Kazhagam	S	Tamil Nadu	42366829	58503189	1	7830146	18.48
Samajwadi Party	S	Uttar Pradesh	86481398	146134603	5	15533620	17.96
AJSU Party	S	Jharkhand	14961958	22404856	1	648277	4.33
Jharkhand Mukti Morcha	S	Jharkhand	14961958	22404856	1	1722635	11.51
Telangana Rashtra Samithi	S	Telangana	18642895	29708615	9	7696848	41.29
Rashtriya Loktantrik Party	U	Rajasthan	32441064	48955813	1	660051	2.03
Viduthalai Chiruthaigal Katchi	U	Tamil Nadu	42366829	58503189	1	500229	1.18
Apna Dal (Soneylal)	U	Uttar Pradesh	86481398	146134603	2	1039478	1.2
Independent	Z	Assam	17986066	22050059	1	764845	4.25
Independent	Z	Karnataka	35138682	51094530	1	1369087	3.9
Independent	Z	Maharashtra	54054245	88676946	1	1992817	3.69
Independent	Z	Dadra & Nagar Haveli	198983	250029	1	97458	48.98

=== Women performance in elections ===
Based on the published data from the Election Commission of India (ECI) website.

==== Participation ====
State/UT	Total seats	Women contestants	Elected	Women contestants %	Elected %
Andhra Pradesh	25	27	4	8.46%	16%
Arunachal Pradesh	2	1	0	8.33%	0
Assam	14	14	1	9.66%	7.14%
Bihar	40	56	3	8.95%	7.5%
Chhattisgarh	11	23	3	13.86%	27.27
Goa	2	2	0	16.67%	0
Gujarat	26	28	6	7.54%	23.08%
Haryana	10	11	1	4.93%	10%
Himachal Pradesh	4	1	0	2.22%	0
Jammu & Kashmir	6	3	0	3.80%	0
Jharkhand	14	25	2	10.92%	14.28%
Karnataka	28	27	2	5.65%	7.14%
Kerala	20	24	1	10.57%	5%
Madhya Pradesh	29	40	4	9.13%	13.79%
Maharashtra	48	79	8	9.11%	16.67%
Manipur	2	0	0	0	0
Meghalaya	2	1	1	11.11%	50%
Mizoram	1	1	0	16.67%	0
Nagaland	1	0	0	0	0
Odisha	21	25	7	14.37%	33.33%
Punjab	13	25	2	8.99%	15.38%
Rajasthan	25	23	3	9.24%	12%
Sikkim	1	1	0	9.09%	0
Tamil Nadu	39	67	3	7.88%	7.69%
Telangana	17	25	1	5.19%	3.7%
Tripura	2	3	1	13.04%	50%
Uttar Pradesh	80	106	11	10.83%	13.75%
Uttarakhand	5	5	1	9.61%	20%
West Bengal	42	54	11	11.59%	26.19%
Andaman & Nicobar Islands (UT)	1	1	0	6.67%	0
Chandigarh (UT)	1	9	1	25%	100%
Dadra & Nagar Haveli (UT)	1	1	0	9.09%	0
Daman & Diu (UT)	1	0	0	0	0
Lakshadweep (UT)	1	0	0	0	0
NCT of Delhi	7	16	1	60.60%	14.28
Puducherry (UT)	1	2	0	81.25%	0
India	543	726	78	9.02%	14.36%

== Results by constituency ==
State	Parliamentary Constituency			Winner			Runner-up			Margin	Margin %
State	No.	Name	Type	Candidate	Party	Votes (Vote%)	Candidate	Party	Votes (Vote%)	Margin	
Andaman and Nicobar Islands	1	Andaman and Nicobar Islands	GEN	Kuldeep Rai Sharma	INC	95,308 (45.95%)	Vishal Jolly	Bharatiya Janata Party	93,901 (45.28%)	1,407	0.67%
Andhra Pradesh	1	Araku	(ST)	Goddeti Madhavi	YSRCP	5,62,190 (52.14%)	Kishore Chandra Deo	TDP	3,38,101 (31.36%)	2,24,089	20.78%
Andhra Pradesh	2	Srikakulam	GEN	Ram Mohan Naidu Kinjarapu	TDP	5,34,544 (45.91%)	Duvvada Srinivas	YSRCP	5,27,891 (45.34%)	6,653	0.57%
Andhra Pradesh	3	Vizianagaram	GEN	Bellana Chandra Sekhar	YSRCP	5,78,418 (47.32%)	Ashok Gajapathi Raju	TDP	5,30,382 (43.39%)	48,036	3.93%
Andhra Pradesh	4	Visakhapatnam	GEN	M. V. V. Satyanarayana	YSRCP	4,36,906 (35.24%)	Bharat Mathukumilli	TDP	4,32,492 (34.88%)	4,414	0.36%
Andhra Pradesh	5	Anakapalli	GEN	Beesetti Venkata Satyavathi	YSRCP	5,86,226 (47.26%)	Aadari Anand	TDP	4,97,034 (40.07%)	89,192	7.19%
Andhra Pradesh	6	Kakinada	GEN	Vanga Geetha	YSRCP	5,37,630 (43.47%)	Chalamalasetti Sunil	TDP	5,11,892 (41.39%)	25,738	2.08%
Andhra Pradesh	7	Amalapuram	(SC)	Chinta Anuradha	YSRCP	4,85,958 (39.34%)	Ganti Harish	TDP	4,46,163 (36.12%)	39,966	3.22%
Andhra Pradesh	8	Rajahmundry	GEN	Margani Bharat	YSRCP	5,82,024 (46.54%)	Maganti Rupa	TDP	4,60,390 (36.82%)	1,21,634	9.72%
Andhra Pradesh	9	Narasapuram	GEN	Raghu Rama Krishna Raju	YSRCP	4,49,234 (38.1%)	Vetukuri Venkata Siva Rama Raju	TDP	4,16,558 (35.33%)	31,909	2.77%
Andhra Pradesh	10	Eluru	GEN	Kotagiri Sridhar	YSRCP	6,76,809 (50.8%)	Maganti Venkateswara Rao	TDP	5,10,884 (38.35%)	1,65,925	12.45%
Andhra Pradesh	11	Machilipatnam	GEN	Vallabhaneni Balasouri	YSRCP	5,72,850 (45.99%)	Konakalla Narayana Rao	TDP	5,12,612 (41.16%)	60,141	4.83%
Andhra Pradesh	12	Vijayawada	GEN	Kesineni Srinivas	TDP	5,75,498 (45.04%)	Prasad V. Potluri	YSR Congress Party	5,66,772 (44.36%)	8,726	0.69%
Andhra Pradesh	13	Guntur	GEN	Galla Jayadev	TDP	5,87,918 (43.5%)	Modugula Venugopala Reddy	YSR Congress Party	5,83,713 (43.19%)	4,205	0.31%
Andhra Pradesh	14	Narasaraopet	GEN	Lavu Sri Krishna Devarayalu	YSRCP	7,45,557 (51.75%)	Rayapati Sambasiva Rao	TDP	5,91,555 (41.06%)	1,53,978	10.69%
Andhra Pradesh	15	Bapatla	(SC)	Nandigam Suresh	YSRCP	5,98,257 (47.11%)	Malyadri Sriram	TDP	5,82,192 (45.84%)	16,065	1.27%
Andhra Pradesh	16	Ongole	GEN	Magunta Sreenivasulu Reddy	YSRCP	7,39,202 (55%)	Sidda Raghava Rao	TDP	5,24,351 (39.01%)	2,14,851	15.99%
Andhra Pradesh	17	Nandyal	GEN	Pocha Brahmananda Reddy	YSRCP	7,20,888 (55.46%)	Mandra Sivananda Reddy	TDP	4,70,769 (36.22%)	2,50,119	19.24%
Andhra Pradesh	18	Kurnool	GEN	Sanjeev Kumar	YSRCP	6,05,462 (50.85%)	Kotla Jayasurya Prakasha Reddy	TDP	4,56,395 (38.33%)	1,48,889	12.52%
Andhra Pradesh	19	Anantapur	GEN	Tallari Rangaiah	YSRCP	6,95,208 (51.57%)	JC Pavan Reddy	TDP	5,53,780 (41.08%)	1,41,428	10.49%
Andhra Pradesh	20	Hindupur	GEN	Kuruva Gorantla Madhav	YSRCP	7,06,602 (52.73%)	Kristappa Nimmala	TDP	5,65,854 (42.33%)	1,40,748	10.4%
Andhra Pradesh	21	Kadapa	GEN	Y. S. Avinash Reddy	YSRCP	7,83,499 (63.41%)	Adi Narayana Reddy	TDP	4,02,773 (32.6%)	3,80,976	30.81%
Andhra Pradesh	22	Nellore	GEN	Adala Prabhakara Reddy	YSRCP	6,83,830 (53.04%)	Beeda Masthan Rao	TDP	5,35,259 (41.52%)	1,48,571	11.52%
Andhra Pradesh	23	Tirupati	(SC)	Balli Durga Prasad Rao	YSRCP	7,22,877 (54.91%)	Panabaka Lakshmi	TDP	4,94,501 (37.56%)	2,28,376	17.35%
Andhra Pradesh	24	Rajampet	GEN	P. V. Midhun Reddy	YSRCP	7,02,211 (57.27%)	D K Satyaprabha	TDP	4,33,927 (35.39%)	2,68,284	21.88%
Andhra Pradesh	25	Chittoor	(SC)	N. Reddeppa	YSRCP	6,86,792 (52.04%)	Naramalli Sivaprasad	TDP	5,49,521 (41.64%)	1,37,271	10.4%
Arunachal Pradesh	1	Arunachal West	(ST)	Kiren Rijiju	Bharatiya Janata Party	2,25,796 (62.02%)	Nabam Tuki	INC	50,953 (14%)	1,74,843	38.02%
Arunachal Pradesh	2	Arunachal East	(ST)	Tapir Gao	Bharatiya Janata Party	1,53,883 (52.04%)	Lowangcha Wanglat	INC	83,935 (28.38%)	69,948	23.66%
Assam	1	Karimganj	(SC)	Kripanath Mallah	Bharatiya Janata Party	4,73,046	Radheshyam Biswas	All India United Democratic Front	4,34,657	38,389	3.62%
Assam	2	Silchar	GEN	Rajdeep Roy	Bharatiya Janata Party	4,99,414	Sushmita Dev	INC	4,17,818	81,596	8.60%
Assam	3	Autonomous District	(ST)	Horen Sing Bey	Bharatiya Janata Party	3,81,316	Biren Singh Engti	INC	1,41,690	2,39,626	38.79%
Assam	4	Dhubri	GEN	Badruddin Ajmal	All India United Democratic Front	7,18,764	Abu Taher Bepari	INC	4,92,506	2,26,258	13.43%
Assam	5	Kokrajhar	(ST)	Naba Kumar Sarania	Independent	4,84,560	Pramila Rani Brahma	Bodoland People's Front	4,46,774	37,786	2.55%
Assam	6	Barpeta	GEN	Abdul Khaleque	INC	6,45,173	Kumar Deepak Das	Asom Gana Parishad	5,04,866	1,40,307	9.62%
Assam	7	Gauhati	GEN	Queen Oja	Bharatiya Janata Party	10,08,936	Bobita Sharma	INC	6,63,330	3,45,606	19.59%
Assam	8	Mangaldoi	GEN	Dilip Saikia	Bharatiya Janata Party	7,35,469	Bhubaneswar Kalita	INC	5,96,924	1,38,545	9.20%
Assam	9	Tezpur	GEN	Pallab Lochan Das	Bharatiya Janata Party	6,84,166	M.G.V.K. Bhanu	INC	4,41,325	2,42,841	20.40%
Assam	10	Nowgong	GEN	Pradyut Bordoloi	INC	7,39,724	Rupak Sharma	Bharatiya Janata Party	7,22,972	16,752	1.13%
Assam	11	Kaliabor	GEN	Gourav Gogoi	INC	7,86,092	Moni Madhab Mahanta	Asom Gana Parishad	5,76,098	2,09,994	14.74%
Assam	12	Jorhat	GEN	Topon Kumar Gogoi	Bharatiya Janata Party	5,43,288	Sushanta Borgohain	INC	4,60,635	82,653	7.81%
Assam	13	Dibrugarh	(GEN)	Rameswar Teli	Bharatiya Janata Party	6,59,583	Paban Singh Ghatowar	INC	2,95,017	3,64,566	35.90%
Assam	14	Lakhimpur	GEN	Pradan Baruah	Bharatiya Janata Party	7,76,406	Anil Borgohain	INC	4,25,855	3,50,551	27.31%
Bihar	1	Valmiki Nagar	GEN	Baidyanath Prasad Mahto	Janata Dal (United)	6,02,660	Shashwat Kedar	INC	2,48,044	3,54,616	34.36%
Bihar	2	Paschim Champaran	GEN	Sanjay Jaiswal	Bharatiya Janata Party	6,03,706	Brijesh Kumar Kushwaha	Rashtriya Lok Samta Party	3,09,800	2,93,906	29.02%
Bihar	3	Purvi Champaran	GEN	Radha Mohan Singh	Bharatiya Janata Party	5,77,787	Akash Kumar Singh	Rashtriya Lok Samta Party	2,84,139	2,93,648	29.38%
Bihar	4	Sheohar	GEN	Rama Devi	Bharatiya Janata Party	6,08,678	Syed Faisal Ali	Rashtriya Janata Dal	2,68,318	3,40,360	33.88%
Bihar	5	Sitamarhi	GEN	Sunil Kumar Pintu	Janata Dal (United)	5,67,745	Arjun Rai	Rashtriya Janata Dal	3,17,206	2,50,539	24.12%
Bihar	6	Madhubani	GEN	Ashok Kumar Yadav	Bharatiya Janata Party	5,95,843	Badri Kumar Purbey	Vikassheel Insaan Party	1,40,903	4,54,940	47.21%
Bihar	7	Jhanjharpur	GEN	Ramprit Mandal	Janata Dal (United)	6,02,391	Gulab Yadav	Rashtriya Janata Dal	2,79,440	3,22,951	30.45%
Bihar	8	Supaul	GEN	Dileshwar Kamait	Janata Dal (United)	5,97,377	Ranjeet Ranjan	INC	3,30,524	2,66,853	24.02%
Bihar	9	Araria	GEN	Pradeep Kumar Singh	Bharatiya Janata Party	6,18,434	Sarfaraz Alam	Rashtriya Janata Dal	4,81,193	1,37,241	11.73%
Bihar	10	Kishanganj	GEN	Mohammad Jawed	INC	3,67,017	Syed Mahmood Ashraf	Janata Dal (United)	3,32,551	34,466	3.13%
Bihar	11	Katihar	GEN	Dulal Chandra Goswami	Janata Dal (United)	5,59,423	Tariq Anwar	INC	5,02,220	57,203	5.12%
Bihar	12	Purnia	GEN	Santosh Kumar	Janata Dal (United)	6,32,924	Uday Singh	INC	3,69,463	2,63,461	22.83%
Bihar	13	Madhepura	GEN	Dinesh Chandra Yadav	Janata Dal (United)	6,24,334	Sharad Yadav	Rashtriya Janata Dal	3,22,807	3,01,527	26.28%
Bihar	14	Darbhanga	GEN	Gopal Jee Thakur	Bharatiya Janata Party	5,86,668	Abdul Bari Siddiqui	Rashtriya Janata Dal	3,18,689	2,67,979	27.77%
Bihar	15	Muzaffarpur	GEN	Ajay Nishad	Bharatiya Janata Party	6,66,878	Raj Bhushan Singh	Vikassheel Insaan Party	2,56,890	4,09,988	39.75%
Bihar	16	Vaishali	GEN	Veena Devi	Lok Janshakti Party	5,68,215	Raghuvansh Prasad Singh	Rashtriya Janata Dal	3,33,631	2,34,584	
Bihar	17	Gopalganj	(SC)	Alok Kumar Suman	Janata Dal (United)	5,68,150	Surendra Ram	Rashtriya Janata Dal	2,81,716	2,86,434	
Bihar	18	Siwan	GEN	Kavita Singh	Janata Dal (United)	4,48,473	Hena Shahab	Rashtriya Janata Dal	3,31,515	1,16,958	
Bihar	19	Maharajganj	GEN	Janardan Singh Sigriwal	Bharatiya Janata Party	5,46,352	Randhir Kumar Singh	Rashtriya Janata Dal	3,15,580	2,30,772	
Bihar	20	Saran	GEN	Rajiv Pratap Rudy	Bharatiya Janata Party	4,99,342	Chandrika Roy	Rashtriya Janata Dal	3,60,913	1,38,429	
Bihar	21	Hajipur	(SC)	Pashupati Kumar Paras	Lok Janshakti Party	5,41,310	Shiv Chandra Ram	Rashtriya Janata Dal	3,35,861	2,05,449	
Bihar	22	Ujiarpur	GEN	Nityanand Rai	Bharatiya Janata Party	5,43,906	Upendra Kushwaha	Rashtriya Lok Samta Party	2,66,628	2,77,278	
Bihar	23	Samastipur	(SC)	Ram Chandra Paswan	Lok Janshakti Party	5,62,443	Ashok Kumar	INC	3,10,800	2,51,643	
Bihar	24	Begusarai	GEN	Giriraj Singh	Bharatiya Janata Party	6,92,193	Kanhaiya Kumar	Communist Party of India	2,69,976	4,22,217	
Bihar	25	Khagaria	GEN	Mehboob Ali Kaiser	Lok Janshakti Party	5,10,193	Mukesh Sahani	Vikassheel Insaan Party	2,61,623	2,48,570	
Bihar	26	Bhagalpur	GEN	Ajay Kumar Mandal	Janata Dal (United)	6,18,254	Shailesh Kumar Mandal	Rashtriya Janata Dal	3,40,624	2,77,630	
Bihar	27	Banka	GEN	Giridhari Yadav	Janata Dal (United)	4,77,788	Jay Prakash Narayan Yadav	Rashtriya Janata Dal	2,77,256	2,00,532	
Bihar	28	Munger	GEN	Rajiv Ranjan Singh	Janata Dal (United)	5,28,762	Nilam Devi	INC	3,60,825	1,67,937	
Bihar	29	Nalanda	GEN	Kaushalendra Kumar	Janata Dal (United)	5,40,888	Ashok Kumar Azad	Hindustani Awam Morcha	2,84,751	2,56,137	
Bihar	30	Patna Sahib	GEN	Ravi Shankar Prasad	Bharatiya Janata Party	6,07,506	Shatrughan Sinha	INC	3,22,849	2,84,657	
Bihar	31	Pataliputra	GEN	Ram Kripal Yadav	Bharatiya Janata Party	5,09,557	Misa Bharti	Rashtriya Janata Dal	4,70,236	39,321	
Bihar	32	Arrah	GEN	R. K. Singh	Bharatiya Janata Party	5,66,480	Raju Yadav	Communist Party of India (Marxist-Leninist) (Liberation)	4,19,195	1,47,285	
Bihar	33	Buxar	GEN	Ashwini Kumar Choubey	Bharatiya Janata Party	4,73,053	Jagadanand Singh	Rashtriya Janata Dal	3,55,444	1,17,609	
Bihar	34	Sasaram	(SC)	Chhedi Paswan	Bharatiya Janata Party	4,94,800	Meira Kumar	INC	3,29,055	1,65,745	
Bihar	35	Karakat	GEN	Mahabali Singh	Janata Dal (United)	3,98,408	Upendra Kushwaha	Rashtriya Lok Samta Party	3,13,866	84,542	
Bihar	36	Jahanabad	GEN	Chandeshwar Prasad	Janata Dal (United)	3,35,584	Surendra Prasad Yadav	Rashtriya Janata Dal	3,33,833	1,751	
Bihar	37	Aurangabad	GEN	Sushil Kumar Singh	Bharatiya Janata Party	4,31,541	Upendra Prasad	Hindustani Awam Morcha	3,58,934	72,607	
Bihar	38	Gaya	(SC)	Vijay Kumar Manjhi	Janata Dal (United)	4,67,007	Jitan Ram Manjhi	Hindustani Awam Morcha	3,14,581	1,52,426	
Bihar	39	Nawada	GEN	Chandan Singh	Lok Janshakti Party	4,95,684	Vibha Devi	Rashtriya Janata Dal	3,47,612	1,48,072	
Bihar	40	Jamui	(SC)	Chirag Paswan	Lok Janshakti Party	5,29,134	Bhudeo Choudhary	Rashtriya Lok Samta Party	2,88,085	2,41,049	
Chandigarh	1	Chandigarh	GEN	Kirron Kher	Bharatiya Janata Party	2,31,188	Pawan Kumar Bansal	INC	1,84,218	46,970	
Chhattisgarh	1	Sarguja	(ST)	Renuka Singh	Bharatiya Janata Party	6,63,711	Khel Sai Singh	INC	5,05,838	1,57,873	
Chhattisgarh	2	Raigarh	(ST)	Gomati Sai	Bharatiya Janata Party	6,58,335	Laljeet Singh Rathia	INC	5,92,308	66,027	
Chhattisgarh	3	Janjgir-Champa	(SC)	Guharam Ajgalley	Bharatiya Janata Party	5,72,790	Ravi Parasram Bhardwaj	INC	4,89,535	83,255	
Chhattisgarh	4	Korba	GEN	Jyotsna Mahant	INC	5,23,410	Jyoti Nand Dubey	Bharatiya Janata Party	4,97,061	26,349	
Chhattisgarh	5	Bilaspur	GEN	Arun Sao	Bharatiya Janata Party	6,34,559	Atal Srivastav	INC	4,92,796	1,41,763	
Chhattisgarh	6	Rajnandgaon	GEN	Santosh Pandey	Bharatiya Janata Party	6,62,387	Bhola Ram Sahu	INC	5,50,421	1,11,966	
Chhattisgarh	7	Durg	GEN	Vijay Baghel	Bharatiya Janata Party	8,49,374	Pratima Chandrakar	INC	4,57,396	3,91,978	
Chhattisgarh	8	Raipur	GEN	Sunil Kumar Soni	Bharatiya Janata Party	8,37,902	Pramod Dubey	INC	4,89,664	3,48,238	
Chhattisgarh	9	Mahasamund	GEN	Chunni Lal Sahu	Bharatiya Janata Party	6,16,580	Dhanendra Sahu	INC	5,26,069	90,511	
Chhattisgarh	10	Bastar	(ST)	Deepak Baij	INC	4,02,527	Baiduram Kashyap	Bharatiya Janata Party	3,63,545	38,982	
Chhattisgarh	11	Kanker	(ST)	Mohan Mandavi	Bharatiya Janata Party	5,46,233	Biresh Thakur	INC	5,39,319	6,914	
Dadra and Nagar Haveli	1	Dadra And Nagar Haveli	(ST)	Mohanbhai Delkar	Independent	90,421	Natubhai Patel	Bharatiya Janata Party	81,420	9,001	
Daman and Diu	1	Daman And Diu	GEN	Lalubhai Patel	Bharatiya Janata Party	37,597	Dahyabhai Patel	INC	27,655	9,942	
NCT Of Delhi	1	Chandni Chowk	GEN	Harsh Vardhan	Bharatiya Janata Party	5,19,055	Jai Parkash Aggarwal	INC	2,90,910	2,28,145	
NCT Of Delhi	2	North East Delhi	GEN	Manoj Tiwari	Bharatiya Janata Party	7,87,799	Sheila Dikshit	INC	4,21,697	3,66,102	
NCT Of Delhi	3	East Delhi	GEN	Gautam Gambhir	Bharatiya Janata Party	6,96,156	Arvinder Singh Lovely	INC	3,04,934	3,91,222	
NCT Of Delhi	4	New Delhi	GEN	Meenakshi Lekhi	Bharatiya Janata Party	5,04,206	Ajay Maken	INC	2,47,702	2,56,504	
NCT Of Delhi	5	North West Delhi	(SC)	Hans Raj Hans	Bharatiya Janata Party	8,48,663	Gugan Singh Ranga	Aam Aadmi Party	2,94,766	5,53,897	
NCT Of Delhi	6	West Delhi	GEN	Parvesh Verma	Bharatiya Janata Party	8,65,648	Mahabal Mishra	INC	2,87,162	5,78,486	
NCT Of Delhi	7	South Delhi	GEN	Ramesh Bidhuri	Bharatiya Janata Party	6,87,014	Raghav Chadha	Aam Aadmi Party	3,19,971	3,67,043	
Goa	1	North Goa	GEN	Shripad Yesso Naik	Bharatiya Janata Party	2,44,844	Giri Raya Chodankar	INC	1,64,597	80,247	
Goa	2	South Goa	GEN	Francisco Sardinha	INC	2,01,561	Narendra Keshav Sawaikar	Bharatiya Janata Party	1,91,806	9,755	
Gujarat	1	Kachchh	(SC)	Vinodbhai Chavda	Bharatiya Janata Party	6,37,034	Naresh Maheshwari	INC	3,31,521	3,05,513	
Gujarat	2	Banaskantha	GEN	Parbatbhai Patel	Bharatiya Janata Party	6,79,108	Parthibhai Bhatol	INC	3,10,812	3,68,296	
Gujarat	3	Patan	GEN	Bharatsinhji Dabhi Thakor	Bharatiya Janata Party	6,33,368	Jagdish Thakor	INC	4,39,489	1,93,879	
Gujarat	4	Mahesana	GEN	Shardaben Patel	Bharatiya Janata Party	6,59,525	A. J. Patel	INC	3,78,006	2,81,519	
Gujarat	5	Sabarkantha	GEN	Dipsinh Rathod	Bharatiya Janata Party	7,01,984	Rajendra Thakor	INC	4,32,997	2,68,987	
Gujarat	6	Gandhinagar	GEN	Amit Shah	Bharatiya Janata Party	8,94,624	C. J. Chavada	INC	3,37,610	5,57,014	
Gujarat	7	Ahmedabad East	GEN	Hasmukhbhai Patel	Bharatiya Janata Party	7,49,834	Gitaben Patel	INC	3,15,504	4,34,330	
Gujarat	8	Ahmedabad West	(SC)	Kirit Solanki	Bharatiya Janata Party	6,41,622	Raju Parmar	INC	3,20,076	3,21,546	
Gujarat	9	Surendranagar	GEN	Mahendra Munjapara	Bharatiya Janata Party	6,31,844	Somabhai Patel	INC	3,54,407	2,77,437	
Gujarat	10	Rajkot	GEN	Mohan Kundariya	Bharatiya Janata Party	7,58,645	Lalit Kagathara	INC	3,90,238	3,68,407	
Gujarat	11	Porbandar	GEN	Rameshbhai Dhaduk	Bharatiya Janata Party	5,63,881	Lalit Vasoya	INC	3,34,058	2,29,823	
Gujarat	12	Jamnagar	GEN	Poonamben Maadam	Bharatiya Janata Party	5,91,588	Murubhai Kandoriya	INC	3,54,784	2,36,804	
Gujarat	13	Junagadh	GEN	Rajesh Chudasama	Bharatiya Janata Party	5,47,952	Punjabhai Vansh	INC	3,97,767	1,50,185	
Gujarat	14	Amreli	GEN	Naranbhai Kachhadiya	Bharatiya Janata Party	5,29,035	Paresh Dhanani	INC	3,27,604	2,01,431	
Gujarat	15	Bhavnagar	GEN	Bharti Shiyal	Bharatiya Janata Party	6,61,273	Manhar Patel	INC	3,31,754	3,29,519	
Gujarat	16	Anand	GEN	Mitesh Patel	Bharatiya Janata Party	6,33,097	Bharatbhai Solanki	INC	4,35,379	1,97,718	
Gujarat	17	Kheda	GEN	Devusinh Chauhan	Bharatiya Janata Party	7,14,572	Bimal Shah	INC	3,47,427	3,67,145	
Gujarat	18	Panchmahal	GEN	Ratansinh Rathod	Bharatiya Janata Party	7,32,136	V. K. Khant	INC	3,03,595	4,28,541	
Gujarat	19	Dahod	(ST)	Jasvantsinh Bhabhor	Bharatiya Janata Party	5,61,760	Babubhai Katara	INC	4,34,164	1,27,596	
Gujarat	20	Vadodara	GEN	Ranjanben Bhatt	Bharatiya Janata Party	8,83,719	Prashant Patel	INC	2,94,542	5,89,177	
Gujarat	21	Chhota Udaipur	(ST)	Gitaben Rathva	Bharatiya Janata Party	7,64,445	Ranjit Mohansinh Rathwa	INC	3,86,502	3,77,943	
Gujarat	22	Bharuch	GEN	Mansukhbhai Vasava	Bharatiya Janata Party	6,37,795	Sherkhan Abdulsakur Pathan	INC	3,03,581	3,34,214	
Gujarat	23	Bardoli	(ST)	Parbhubhai Vasava	Bharatiya Janata Party	7,42,273	Tusharbhai Chaudhari	INC	5,26,826	2,15,447	
Gujarat	24	Surat	GEN	Darshana Jardosh	Bharatiya Janata Party	7,95,651	Ashok Adhevada	INC	2,47,421	5,48,230	
Gujarat	25	Navsari	GEN	C. R. Patil	Bharatiya Janata Party	9,72,739	Dharmesh Bhimbhai Patel	INC	2,83,071	6,89,668	
Gujarat	26	Valsad	(ST)	K C Patel	Bharatiya Janata Party	7,71,980	Jitu Chaudhary	INC	4,18,183	3,53,797	
Haryana	1	Ambala	(SC)	Rattan Lal Kataria	Bharatiya Janata Party	7,46,508	Selja Kumari	INC	4,04,163	3,42,345	
Haryana	2	Kurukshetra	GEN	Nayab Singh	Bharatiya Janata Party	6,88,629	Nirmal Singh	INC	3,04,038	3,84,591	
Haryana	3	Sirsa	(SC)	Sunita Duggal	Bharatiya Janata Party	7,14,351	Ashok Tanwar	INC	4,04,433	3,09,918	
Haryana	4	Hisar	GEN	Bijendra Singh	Bharatiya Janata Party	6,03,289	Dushyant Chautala	Jannayak Janta Party	2,89,221	3,14,068	
Haryana	5	Karnal	GEN	Sanjay Bhatia	Bharatiya Janata Party	9,11,594	Kuldeep Sharma	INC	2,55,452	6,56,142	
Haryana	6	Sonipat	GEN	Ramesh Chander Kaushik	Bharatiya Janata Party	5,87,664	Bhupinder Singh Hooda	INC	4,22,800	1,64,864	
Haryana	7	Rohtak	GEN	Arvind Kumar Sharma	Bharatiya Janata Party	5,73,845	Deepender Singh Hooda	INC	5,66,342	7,503	
Haryana	8	Bhiwani–Mahendragarh	GEN	Dharambir Singh	Bharatiya Janata Party	7,36,699	Shruti Choudhry	INC	2,92,236	4,44,463	
Haryana	9	Gurgaon	GEN	Inderjit Singh Rao	Bharatiya Janata Party	8,81,546	Ajay Singh Yadav	INC	4,95,290	3,86,256	
Haryana	10	Faridabad	GEN	Krishan Pal Gurjar	Bharatiya Janata Party	9,13,222	Avtar Singh Bhadana	INC	2,74,983	6,38,239	
Himachal Pradesh	1	Kangra	GEN	Kishan Kapoor	Bharatiya Janata Party	7,25,218	Pawan Kajal	INC	2,47,595	4,77,623	
Himachal Pradesh	2	Mandi	GEN	Ram Swaroop Sharma	Bharatiya Janata Party	6,47,189	Aashray Sharma	INC	2,41,730	4,05,459	
Himachal Pradesh	3	Hamirpur	GEN	Anurag Thakur	Bharatiya Janata Party	6,82,692	Ram Lal Thakur	INC	2,83,120	3,99,572	
Himachal Pradesh	4	Shimla	(SC)	Suresh Kumar Kashyap	Bharatiya Janata Party	6,06,183	Dhani Ram Shandil	INC	2,78,668	3,27,515	
Jammu and Kashmir	1	Baramulla	GEN	Mohammad Akbar Lone	Jammu & Kashmir National Conference	1,33,376	Raja Aijaz Ali	Jammu and Kashmir People's Conference	1,02,618	30,758	
Jammu and Kashmir	2	Srinagar	GEN	Farooq Abdullah	Jammu & Kashmir National Conference	1,06,750	Aga Syed Mohsin	Jammu and Kashmir Peoples Democratic Party	36,700	70,050	
Jammu and Kashmir	3	Anantnag	GEN	Hasnain Masoodi	Jammu & Kashmir National Conference	40,180	Ghulam Ahmad Mir	INC	33,504	6,676	
Jammu and Kashmir	4	Ladakh	GEN	Jamyang Tsering Namgyal	Bharatiya Janata Party	42,914	Sajjad Hussain	Independent	31,984	10,930	
Jammu and Kashmir	5	Udhampur	GEN	Jitendra Singh	Bharatiya Janata Party	7,24,311	Vikramaditya Singh	INC	3,67,059	3,57,252	
Jammu and Kashmir	6	Jammu	GEN	Jugal Kishore Sharma	Bharatiya Janata Party	8,58,066	Raman Bhalla	INC	5,55,191	3,02,875	
Jharkhand	1	Rajmahal	(ST)	Vijay Hansdak	Jharkhand Mukti Morcha	5,07,830	Hemlal Murmu	Bharatiya Janata Party	4,08,635	99,195	
Jharkhand	2	Dumka	(ST)	Sunil Soren	Bharatiya Janata Party	4,84,923	Shibu Soren	Jharkhand Mukti Morcha	4,37,333	47,590	
Jharkhand	3	Godda	GEN	Nishikant Dubey	Bharatiya Janata Party	6,37,610	Pradeep Yadav	Jharkhand Vikas Morcha (Prajatantrik)	4,53,383	1,84,227	
Jharkhand	4	Chatra	GEN	Sunil Kumar Singh	Bharatiya Janata Party	5,28,077	Manoj Kumar Yadav	INC	1,50,206	3,77,871	
Jharkhand	5	Kodarma	GEN	Annapurna Devi Yadav	Bharatiya Janata Party	7,53,016	Babulal Marandi	Jharkhand Vikas Morcha (Prajatantrik)	2,97,416	4,55,600	
Jharkhand	6	Giridih	GEN	Chandra Prakash Chaudhary	All Jharkhand Students Union	6,48,277	Jagarnath Mahto	Jharkhand Mukti Morcha	3,99,930	2,48,347	
Jharkhand	7	Dhanbad	GEN	Pashupati Nath Singh	Bharatiya Janata Party	8,27,234	Kirti Azad	INC	3,41,040	4,86,194	
Jharkhand	8	Ranchi	GEN	Sanjay Seth	Bharatiya Janata Party	7,06,828	Subodh Kant Sahay	INC	4,23,802	2,83,026	
Jharkhand	9	Jamshedpur	GEN	Vidyut Mahato	Bharatiya Janata Party	6,79,632	Champai Soren	Jharkhand Mukti Morcha	3,77,542	3,02,090	
Jharkhand	10	Singhbhum	(SC)	Geeta Koda	INC	4,31,815	Laxman Giluwa	Bharatiya Janata Party	3,59,660	72,155	
Jharkhand	11	Khunti	(ST)	Arjun Munda	Bharatiya Janata Party	3,82,638	Kali Charan Munda	INC	3,81,193	1,445	
Jharkhand	12	Lohardaga	(ST)	Sudarshan Bhagat	Bharatiya Janata Party	3,71,595	Sukhdeo Bhagat	INC	3,61,232	10,363	
Jharkhand	13	Palamau	(SC)	Vishnu Dayal Ram	Bharatiya Janata Party	7,55,659	Ghuran Ram	Rashtriya Janata Dal	2,78,053	4,77,606	
Jharkhand	14	Hazaribagh	GEN	Jayant Sinha	Bharatiya Janata Party	7,28,798	Gopal Sahu	INC	2,49,250	4,79,548	
Karnataka	1	Chikkodi	GEN	Annasaheb Jolle	Bharatiya Janata Party	6,45,017	Prakash Hukkeri	INC	5,26,140	1,18,877	
Karnataka	2	Belgaum	GEN	Suresh Angadi	Bharatiya Janata Party	7,61,991	Sadhunavar	INC	3,70,687	3,91,304	
Karnataka	3	Bagalkot	GEN	P. C. Gaddigoudar	Bharatiya Janata Party	6,64,638	Veena Kashappanavar	INC	4,96,451	1,68,187	
Karnataka	4	Bijapur	(SC)	Ramesh Jigajinagi	Bharatiya Janata Party	6,35,867	Sunita Devanand Chavan	Janata Dal (Secular)	3,77,829	2,58,038	
Karnataka	5	Gulbarga	(SC)	Umesh. G. Jadhav	Bharatiya Janata Party	6,20,192	Mallikarjun Kharge	INC	5,24,740	95,452	
Karnataka	6	Raichur	(ST)	Raja Amareswara Naik	Bharatiya Janata Party	5,98,337	B. V. Nayak	INC	4,80,621	1,17,716	
Karnataka	7	Bidar	GEN	Bhagwanth Khuba	Bharatiya Janata Party	5,85,471	Eshwara Khandre	INC	4,68,637	1,16,834	
Karnataka	8	Koppal	GEN	Karadi Sanganna	Bharatiya Janata Party	5,86,783	Rajashekar Hitnal	INC	5,48,386	38,397	
Karnataka	9	Bellary	(ST)	Y. Devendrappa	Bharatiya Janata Party	6,16,388	V. S. Ugrappa	INC	5,60,681	55,707	
Karnataka	10	Haveri	GEN	Shivkumar Udasi	Bharatiya Janata Party	6,83,660	D. R. Patil	INC	5,42,778	1,40,882	
Karnataka	11	Dharwad	GEN	Pralhad Joshi	Bharatiya Janata Party	6,84,837	Vinay Kulkarni	INC	4,79,765	2,05,072	
Karnataka	12	Uttara Kannada	GEN	Anantkumar Hegde	Bharatiya Janata Party	7,86,042	Anand Asnotikar	Janata Dal (Secular)	3,06,393	4,79,649	
Karnataka	13	Davanagere	GEN	G. M. Siddeshwara	Bharatiya Janata Party	6,52,996	H. B. Manjappa	INC	4,83,294	1,69,702	
Karnataka	14	Shimoga	GEN	B. Y. Raghavendra	Bharatiya Janata Party	7,29,872	Madhu Bangarappa	Janata Dal (Secular)	5,06,512	2,23,360	
Karnataka	15	Udupi Chikmagalur	GEN	Shobha Karandlaje	Bharatiya Janata Party	7,18,916	Pramod Madhwaraj	Janata Dal (Secular)	3,69,317	3,49,599	
Karnataka	16	Hassan	GEN	Prajwal Revanna	Janata Dal (Secular)	6,76,606	A. Manju	Bharatiya Janata Party	5,35,282	1,41,324	
Karnataka	17	Dakshina Kannada	GEN	Nalin Kumar Kateel	Bharatiya Janata Party	7,74,285	Mithun M. Rai	INC	4,99,664	2,74,621	
Karnataka	18	Chitradurga	(SC)	A Narayanaswamy	Bharatiya Janata Party	6,26,195	B. N. Chandrappa	INC	5,46,017	80,178	
Karnataka	19	Tumkur	GEN	G. S. Basavaraj	Bharatiya Janata Party	5,96,127	H. D. Devegowda	Janata Dal (Secular)	5,82,788	13,339	
Karnataka	20	Mandya	GEN	Sumalatha Ambareesh	Independent	7,03,660	Nikhil Kumaraswamy	Janata Dal (Secular)	5,77,784	1,25,876	
Karnataka	21	Mysore	GEN	Pratap Simha	Bharatiya Janata Party	6,88,974	C. H. Vijayashankar	INC	5,50,327	1,38,647	
Karnataka	22	Chamarajanagar	(SC)	Srinivas Prasad	Bharatiya Janata Party	5,68,537	R. Dhruvanarayana	INC	5,66,720	1,817	
Karnataka	23	Bangalore Rural	GEN	D. K. Suresh	Indian National Congress	8,78,258	Ashwathnarayan Gowda	Bharatiya Janata Party	6,71,388	2,06,870	
Karnataka	24	Bangalore North	GEN	Sadananda Gowda	Bharatiya Janata Party	8,24,500	Krishna Byre Gowda	INC	6,76,982	1,47,518	
Karnataka	25	Bangalore Central	GEN	P. C. Mohan	Bharatiya Janata Party	6,02,853	Rizwan Arshad	INC	5,31,885	70,968	
Karnataka	26	Bangalore South	GEN	Tejasvi Surya	Bharatiya Janata Party	7,39,229	B. K. Hariprasad	INC	4,08,037	3,31,192	
Karnataka	27	Chikballapur	GEN	B. N. Bache Gowda	Bharatiya Janata Party	7,45,912	M. Veerappa Moily	INC	5,63,802	1,82,110	
Karnataka	28	Kolar	GEN	S. Muniswamy	Bharatiya Janata Party	7,09,165	K. H. Muniyappa	INC	4,99,144	2,10,021	
Kerala	1	Kasaragod	GEN	Rajmohan Unnithan	INC	4,74,961	K. P. Satheesh Chandran	Communist Party of India (Marxist)	4,34,523	40,438	
Kerala	2	Kannur	GEN	K. Sudhakaran	INC	5,29,741	P.K. Sreemathy	Communist Party of India (Marxist)	4,35,182	94,559	
Kerala	3	Vatakara	GEN	K. Muraleedharan	INC	5,26,755	P. Jayarajan	Communist Party of India (Marxist)	4,42,092	84,663	
Kerala	4	Wayanad	GEN	Rahul Gandhi	INC	7,06,367	P. P. Suneer	Communist Party of India	2,74,597	4,31,770	
Kerala	5	Kozhikode	GEN	M. K. Raghavan	INC	4,93,444	A. Pradeepkumar	Communist Party of India (Marxist)	4,08,219	85,225	
Kerala	6	Malappuram	GEN	P. K. Kunhalikutty	Indian Union Muslim League	5,89,873	V.P. Sanu	Communist Party of India (Marxist)	3,29,720	2,60,153	
Kerala	7	Ponnani	GEN	E. T. Muhammed Basheer	Indian Union Muslim League	5,21,824	P. V. Anvar	Independent	3,28,551	1,93,273	
Kerala	8	Palakkad	GEN	V. K. Sreekandan	INC	3,99,274	M.B. Rajesh	Communist Party of India (Marxist)	3,87,637	11,637	
Kerala	9	Alathur	(SC)	Ramya Haridas	INC	5,33,815	P.K. Biju	Communist Party of India (Marxist)	3,74,847	1,58,968	
Kerala	10	Thrissur	GEN	T. N. Prathapan	INC	4,15,089	Rajaji Mathew Thomas	Communist Party of India	3,21,456	93,633	
Kerala	11	Chalakudy	GEN	Benny Behanan	INC	4,73,444	Innocent Vareed Thekkethala	Communist Party of India (Marxist)	3,41,170	1,32,274	
Kerala	12	Ernakulam	GEN	Hibi Eden	INC	4,91,263	P. Rajeev	Communist Party of India (Marxist)	3,22,110	1,69,153	
Kerala	13	Idukki	GEN	Dean Kuriakose	INC	4,98,493	Joice George	Independent	3,27,440	1,71,053	
Kerala	14	Kottayam	GEN	Thomas Chazhikadan	Kerala Congress (M)	4,21,046	V. N. Vasavan	Communist Party of India (Marxist)	3,14,787	1,06,259	
Kerala	15	Alappuzha	GEN	A. M. Ariff	Communist Party of India (Marxist)	4,45,970	Shanimol Usman	INC	4,35,496	10,474	
Kerala	16	Mavelikkara	(SC)	Kodikkunnil Suresh	INC	4,40,415	Chittayam Gopakumar	Communist Party of India	3,79,277	61,138	
Kerala	17	Pathanamthitta	GEN	Anto Antony	INC	3,80,927	Veena George	Communist Party of India (Marxist)	3,36,684	44,243	
Kerala	18	Kollam	GEN	N. K. Premachandran	Revolutionary Socialist Party	4,99,677	K. N. Balagopal	Communist Party of India (Marxist)	3,50,821	1,48,856	
Kerala	19	Attingal	GEN	Adoor Prakash	INC	3,80,995	A. Sampath	Communist Party of India (Marxist)	3,42,748	38,247	
Kerala	20	Thiruvananthapuram	GEN	Shashi Tharoor	INC	4,16,131	Kummanam Rajasekharan	Bharatiya Janata Party	3,16,142	99,989	
Lakshadweep	1	Lakshadweep	(ST)	Mohammed Faizal P. P.	Nationalist Congress Party	22,851	Muhammed Hamdulla Sayeed	INC	22,028	823	
Madhya Pradesh	1	Morena	GEN	Narendra Singh Tomar	Bharatiya Janata Party	5,41,689	Ramnivas Rawat	INC	4,28,348	1,13,341	
Madhya Pradesh	2	Bhind	(SC)	Sandhya Ray	Bharatiya Janata Party	5,27,694	Devashish Jharariya	INC	3,27,809	1,99,885	
Madhya Pradesh	3	Gwalior	GEN	Vivek Sejwalker	Bharatiya Janata Party	6,27,250	Ashok Singh	INC	4,80,408	1,46,842	
Madhya Pradesh	4	Guna	GEN	Krishna Pal Singh Yadav	Bharatiya Janata Party	6,14,049	Jyotiraditya Scindia	INC	4,88,500	1,25,549	
Madhya Pradesh	5	Sagar	GEN	Raj Bahadur Singh	Bharatiya Janata Party	6,46,231	Prabhu Singh Thakur	INC	3,40,689	3,05,542	
Madhya Pradesh	6	Tikamgarh	(SC)	Virendra Kumar	Bharatiya Janata Party	6,72,248	Ahirwar Kiran	INC	3,24,189	3,48,059	
Madhya Pradesh	7	Damoh	GEN	Prahlad Singh Patel	Bharatiya Janata Party	7,04,524	Pratap Singh	INC	3,51,113	3,53,411	
Madhya Pradesh	8	Khajuraho	GEN	Vishnu Datt Sharma	Bharatiya Janata Party	8,11,135	Kavita Singh	INC	3,18,753	4,92,382	
Madhya Pradesh	9	Satna	GEN	Ganesh Singh	Bharatiya Janata Party	5,88,753	Rajaram Tripathi	INC	3,57,280	2,31,473	
Madhya Pradesh	10	Rewa	GEN	Janardan Mishra	Bharatiya Janata Party	5,83,745	Siddhartha Tiwari	INC	2,70,938	3,12,807	
Madhya Pradesh	11	Sidhi	GEN	Riti Pathak	Bharatiya Janata Party	6,98,342	Ajay Arjun Singh	INC	4,11,818	2,86,524	
Madhya Pradesh	12	Shahdol	(ST)	Himadri Singh	Bharatiya Janata Party	7,47,977	Pramila Singh	INC	3,44,644	4,03,333	
Madhya Pradesh	13	Jabalpur	GEN	Rakesh Singh	Bharatiya Janata Party	8,26,454	Vivek Tankha	INC	3,71,710	4,54,744	
Madhya Pradesh	14	Mandla	(ST)	Faggan Singh Kulaste	Bharatiya Janata Party	7,37,266	Kamal Singh Maravi	INC	6,39,592	97,674	
Madhya Pradesh	15	Balaghat	GEN	Dhal Singh Bisen	Bharatiya Janata Party	6,96,102	Madhu Bhagat	INC	4,54,036	2,42,066	
Madhya Pradesh	16	Chhindwara	GEN	Nakul Nath	INC	5,87,305	Nathansaha Kawreti	Bharatiya Janata Party	5,49,769	37,536	
Madhya Pradesh	17	Hoshangabad	GEN	Uday Pratap Singh	Bharatiya Janata Party	8,77,927	Shailendra Diwan	INC	3,24,245	5,53,682	
Madhya Pradesh	18	Vidisha	GEN	Ramakant Bhargava	Bharatiya Janata Party	8,53,022	Shailendra Patel	INC	3,49,938	5,03,084	
Madhya Pradesh	19	Bhopal	GEN	Pragya Thakur	Bharatiya Janata Party	8,66,482	Digvijaya Singh	INC	5,01,660	3,64,822	
Madhya Pradesh	20	Rajgarh	GEN	Rodmal Nagar	Bharatiya Janata Party	8,23,824	Mona Sustani	INC	3,92,805	4,31,019	
Madhya Pradesh	21	Dewas	(SC)	Mahendra Singh Solanki	Bharatiya Janata Party	8,62,429	Prahlad Singh Tipanya	INC	4,90,180	3,72,249	
Madhya Pradesh	22	Ujjain	(SC)	Anil Firojiya	Bharatiya Janata Party	7,91,663	Babulal Malviya	INC	4,26,026	3,65,637	
Madhya Pradesh	23	Mandsaur	GEN	Sudheer Gupta	Bharatiya Janata Party	8,47,786	Meenakshi Natarajan	INC	4,71,052	3,76,734	
Madhya Pradesh	24	Ratlam	(ST)	Guman Singh Damor	Bharatiya Janata Party	6,96,103	Kantilal Bhuria	INC	6,05,467	90,636	
Madhya Pradesh	25	Dhar	(ST)	Chattar Singh Darbar	Bharatiya Janata Party	7,22,147	Girwal Dinesh	INC	5,66,118	1,56,029	
Madhya Pradesh	26	Indore	GEN	Shankar Lalwani	Bharatiya Janata Party	10,68,569	Pankaj Sanghvi	INC	5,20,815	5,47,754	
Madhya Pradesh	27	Khargone	(ST)	Gajendra Patel	Bharatiya Janata Party	7,73,550	Govind Subhan Mujalda	INC	5,71,040	2,02,510	
Madhya Pradesh	28	Khandwa	GEN	Nandkumar Singh Chauhan	Bharatiya Janata Party	8,38,909	Arun Subhash Chandra Yadav	INC	5,65,566	2,73,343	
Madhya Pradesh	29	Betul	(ST)	Durga Das Uikey	Bharatiya Janata Party	8,11,248	Ramu Tekam	INC	4,51,007	3,60,241	
Maharashtra	1	Nandurbar	(ST)	Heena Gavit	Bharatiya Janata Party	6,39,136	K. C. Padavi	INC	5,43,507	95,629	
Maharashtra	2	Dhule	GEN	Subhash Bhamre	Bharatiya Janata Party	6,13,533	Kunal Rohidas Patil	INC	3,84,290	2,29,243	
Maharashtra	3	Jalgaon	GEN	Unmesh Patil	Bharatiya Janata Party	7,13,874	Gulabrao Deokar	Nationalist Congress Party	3,02,257	4,11,617	
Maharashtra	4	Raver	GEN	Raksha Khadase	Bharatiya Janata Party	6,55,386	Ulhas Vasudeo Patil	INC	3,19,504	3,35,882	
Maharashtra	5	Buldhana	GEN	Prataprao Jadhav	Shiv Sena	5,21,977	Rajendra Shingne	Nationalist Congress Party	3,88,690	1,33,287	
Maharashtra	6	Akola	GEN	Sanjay Dhotre	Bharatiya Janata Party	5,54,444	Prakash Ambedkar	Vanchit Bahujan Aghadi	2,78,848	2,75,596	
Maharashtra	7	Amravati	(SC)	Navaneet Rana	Independent	5,10,947	Anandrao Adsul	Shiv Sena	4,73,996	36,951	
Maharashtra	8	Wardha	GEN	Ramdas Tadas	Bharatiya Janata Party	5,78,364	Charulata Tokas	INC	3,91,173	1,87,191	
Maharashtra	9	Ramtek	(SC)	Krupal Tumane	Shiv Sena	5,97,126	Kishore Uttamrao Gajbhiye	INC	4,70,343	1,26,783	
Maharashtra	10	Nagpur	GEN	Nitin Gadkari	Bharatiya Janata Party	6,60,221	Nanabhau Patole	INC	4,44,212	2,16,009	
Maharashtra	11	Bhandara-Gondiya	GEN	Sunil Baburao Mendhe	Bharatiya Janata Party	6,50,243	Panchabudhe Nana Jairam	Nationalist Congress Party	4,52,849	1,97,394	
Maharashtra	12	Gadchiroli-Chimur	(ST)	Ashok Nete	Bharatiya Janata Party	5,19,968	Namdeo Usendi	INC	4,42,442	77,526	
Maharashtra	13	Chandrapur	GEN	Suresh Dhanorkar	INC	5,59,507	Hansraj Ahir	Bharatiya Janata Party	5,14,744	44,763	
Maharashtra	14	Yavatmal-Washim	GEN	Bhavana Gawali	Shiv Sena	5,42,098	Manikrao Thakre	INC	4,24,159	1,17,939	
Maharashtra	15	Hingoli	GEN	Hemant Patil	Shiv Sena	5,86,312	Subhashrao Wankhede	INC	3,08,456	2,77,856	
Maharashtra	16	Nanded	GEN	Prataprao Chikhalikar	Bharatiya Janata Party	4,86,806	Ashok Chavan	INC	4,46,658	40,148	
Maharashtra	17	Parbhani	GEN	Sanjay Jadhav	Shiv Sena	5,38,941	Rajesh Uttamrao Vitekar	Nationalist Congress Party	4,96,742	42,199	
Maharashtra	18	Jalna	GEN	Raosaheb Danve	Bharatiya Janata Party	6,98,019	Autade Vilas Keshavrao	INC	3,65,204	3,32,815	
Maharashtra	19	Aurangabad	GEN	Imtiyaz Jaleel	All India Majlis-e-Ittehadul Muslimeen	3,89,042	Chandrakant Khaire	Shiv Sena	3,84,550	4,492	
Maharashtra	20	Dindori	(ST)	Bharati Pawar	Bharatiya Janata Party	5,67,470	Dhanraj Mahale	Nationalist Congress Party	3,68,691	1,98,779	
Maharashtra	21	Nashik	GEN	Hemant Godse	Shiv Sena	5,63,599	Sameer Bhujbal	Nationalist Congress Party	2,71,395	2,92,204	
Maharashtra	22	Palghar	(ST)	Rajendra Gavit	Shiv Sena	5,80,479	Baliram Jadhav	Bahujan Vikas Aaghadi	4,91,596	88,883	
Maharashtra	23	Bhiwandi	GEN	Kapil Patil	Bharatiya Janata Party	5,23,583	Suresh Taware	INC	3,67,254	1,56,329	
Maharashtra	24	Kalyan	GEN	Shrikant Shinde	Shiv Sena	5,59,723	Babaji Balram Patil	Nationalist Congress Party	2,15,380	3,44,343	
Maharashtra	25	Thane	GEN	Rajan Vichare	Shiv Sena	7,40,969	Anand Paranjape	Nationalist Congress Party	3,28,824	4,12,145	
Maharashtra	26	Mumbai North	GEN	Gopal Shetty	Bharatiya Janata Party	7,06,678	Urmila Matondkar	INC	2,41,431	4,65,247	
Maharashtra	27	Mumbai North West	GEN	Gajanan Kirtikar	Shiv Sena	5,70,063	Sanjay Nirupam	INC	3,09,735	2,60,328	
Maharashtra	28	Mumbai North East	GEN	Manoj Kotak	Bharatiya Janata Party	5,14,599	Sanjay Dina Patil	Nationalist Congress Party	2,88,113	2,26,486	
Maharashtra	29	Mumbai North Central	GEN	Poonam Mahajan	Bharatiya Janata Party	4,86,672	Priya Sunil Dutt	INC	3,56,667	1,30,005	
Maharashtra	30	Mumbai South Central	GEN	Rahul Shewale	Shiv Sena	4,24,913	Eknath Gaikwad	INC	2,72,774	1,52,139	
Maharashtra	31	Mumbai South	GEN	Arvind Sawant	Shiv Sena	4,21,937	Milind Deora	INC	3,21,870	1,00,067	
Maharashtra	32	Raigad	GEN	Sunil Tatkare	Nationalist Congress Party	4,86,968	Anant Geete	Shiv Sena	4,55,530	31,438	
Maharashtra	33	Maval	GEN	Shrirang Barne	Shiv Sena	7,20,663	Parth Pawar	Nationalist Congress Party	5,04,750	2,15,913	
Maharashtra	34	Pune	GEN	Girish Bapat	Bharatiya Janata Party	6,32,835	Mohan Joshi	INC	3,08,207	3,24,628	
Maharashtra	35	Baramati	GEN	Supriya Sule	Nationalist Congress Party	6,86,714	Kanchan Kul	Bharatiya Janata Party	5,30,940	1,55,774	
Maharashtra	36	Shirur	GEN	Amol Kolhe	Nationalist Congress Party	6,35,830	Shivajirao Adhalarao Patil	Shiv Sena	5,77,347	58,483	
Maharashtra	37	Ahmednagar	GEN	Sujay Vikhe Patil	Bharatiya Janata Party	7,04,660	Sangram Jagtap	Nationalist Congress Party	4,23,186	2,81,474	
Maharashtra	38	Shirdi	(SC)	Sadashiv Lokhande	Shiv Sena	4,86,820	Kamble Bhausaheb Malhari	INC	3,66,625	1,20,195	
Maharashtra	39	Beed	GEN	Pritam Munde	Bharatiya Janata Party	6,78,175	Bajrang Manohar Sonwane	Nationalist Congress Party	5,09,807	1,68,368	
Maharashtra	40	Osmanabad	GEN	Omraje Nimbalkar	Shiv Sena	5,96,640	Rana Jagjitsinha Padmasinha Patil	Nationalist Congress Party	4,69,074	1,27,566	
Maharashtra	41	Latur	(SC)	Sudhakar Shrungare	Bharatiya Janata Party	6,61,495	Kamant Machhindra Gunwantrao	INC	3,72,384	2,89,111	
Maharashtra	42	Solapur	(SC)	Jaisidhesvar Swami	Bharatiya Janata Party	5,24,985	Sushilkumar Shinde	INC	3,66,377	1,58,608	
Maharashtra	43	Madha	GEN	Ranjit Naik-Nimbalkar	Bharatiya Janata Party	5,86,314	Sanjay Vitthalrao Shinde	Nationalist Congress Party	5,00,550	85,764	
Maharashtra	44	Sangli	GEN	Sanjaykaka Patil	Bharatiya Janata Party	5,08,995	Vishal Prakashbapu Patil	Swabhimani Paksha	3,44,643	1,64,352	
Maharashtra	45	Satara	GEN	Udayanraje Bhosale	Nationalist Congress Party	5,79,026	Narendra Annasaheb Patil	Shiv Sena	4,52,498	1,26,528	
Maharashtra	46	Ratnagiri-Sindhudurg	GEN	Vinayak Raut	Shiv Sena	4,58,022	Nilesh Narayan Rane	Maharashtra Swabhiman Paksha	2,79,700	1,78,322	
Maharashtra	47	Kolhapur	GEN	Sanjay Mandlik	Shiv Sena	7,49,085	Dhananjay Mahadik	Nationalist Congress Party	4,78,517	2,70,568	
Maharashtra	48	Hatkanangle	GEN	Dhairyashil Mane	Shiv Sena	5,85,776	Raju Shetti	Swabhimani Paksha	4,89,737	96,039	
Manipur	1	Inner Manipur	GEN	Rajkumar Ranjan Singh	Bharatiya Janata Party	2,63,632	Oinam Nabakishore Singh	INC	2,45,877	17,755	
Manipur	2	Outer Manipur	(ST)	Lorho S. Pfoze	Naga People's Front	3,63,527	Houlim Shokhopao Mate	Bharatiya Janata Party	2,89,745	73,782	
Meghalaya	1	Shillong	(ST)	Vincent Pala	INC	4,19,689	Jemino Mawthoh	United Democratic Party	2,67,256	1,52,433	
Meghalaya	2	Tura	(ST)	Agatha Sangma	National People's Party	3,04,455	Mukul Sangma	INC	2,40,425	64,030	
Mizoram	1	Mizoram	(ST)	C. Lalrosanga	Mizo National Front	2,24,286	Lalnghinglova Hmar	Independent	2,16,146	8,140	
Nagaland	1	Nagaland	(ST)	Tokheho Yepthomi	Nationalist Democratic Progressive Party	5,00,510	K L Chishi	INC	4,84,166	16,344	
Odisha	1	Bargarh	GEN	Suresh Pujari	Bharatiya Janata Party	5,81,245	Prasanna Acharya	Biju Janata Dal	5,17,306	63,939	
Odisha	2	Sundargarh	(ST)	Jual Oram	Bharatiya Janata Party	5,00,056	Sunita Biswal	Biju Janata Dal	2,76,991	2,23,065	
Odisha	3	Sambalpur	GEN	Nitesh Gangadev	Bharatiya Janata Party	4,73,770	Nalini Kant Pradhan	Biju Janata Dal	4,64,608	9,162	
Odisha	4	Keonjhar	(ST)	Chandrani Murmu	Biju Janata Dal	5,26,359	Ananta Nayak	Bharatiya Janata Party	4,60,156	66,203	
Odisha	5	Mayurbhanj	(ST)	Bishweswar Tudu	Bharatiya Janata Party	4,83,812	Debashish Marndi	Biju Janata Dal	4,58,556	25,256	
Odisha	6	Balasore	GEN	Pratap Chandra Sarangi	Bharatiya Janata Party	4,83,858	Rabindra Kumar Jena	Biju Janata Dal	4,70,902	12,956	
Odisha	7	Bhadrak	(SC)	Manjulata Mandal	Biju Janata Dal	5,12,305	Avimanyu Sethi	Bharatiya Janata Party	4,83,502	28,803	
Odisha	8	Jajpur	(SC)	Sarmistha Sethi	Biju Janata Dal	5,44,020	Amiya Kanta Mallick	Bharatiya Janata Party	4,42,327	1,01,693	
Odisha	9	Dhenkanal	GEN	Mahesh Sahoo	Biju Janata Dal	5,22,884	Rudra Narayan Pany	Bharatiya Janata Party	4,87,472	35,412	
Odisha	10	Bolangir	GEN	Sangeeta Kumari Singh Deo	Bharatiya Janata Party	4,98,086	Kalikesh Narayan Singh Deo	Biju Janata Dal	4,78,570	19,516	
Odisha	11	Kalahandi	GEN	Basanta Kumar Panda	Bharatiya Janata Party	4,33,074	Pushpendra Singh Deo	Biju Janata Dal	4,06,260	26,814	
Odisha	12	Nabarangpur	(ST)	Ramesh Chandra Majhi	Biju Janata Dal	3,92,504	Pradeep Kumar Majhi	INC	3,50,870	41,634	
Odisha	13	Kandhamal	GEN	Achyutananda Samanta	Biju Janata Dal	4,61,679	Mahamegha Bahan Aira Kharabela Swain	Bharatiya Janata Party	3,12,463	1,49,216	
Odisha	14	Cuttack	GEN	Bhartruhari Mahtab	Biju Janata Dal	5,24,592	Prakash Mishra	Bharatiya Janata Party	4,03,391	1,21,201	
Odisha	15	Kendrapara	GEN	Anubhav Mohanty	Biju Janata Dal	6,28,939	Baijayant Panda	Bharatiya Janata Party	4,76,355	1,52,584	
Odisha	16	Jagatsinghpur	(SC)	Rajashree Mallick	Biju Janata Dal	6,19,985	Bibhu Prasad Tarai	Bharatiya Janata Party	3,48,330	2,71,655	
Odisha	17	Puri	GEN	Pinaki Mishra	Biju Janata Dal	5,38,321	Sambit Patra	Bharatiya Janata Party	5,26,607	11,714	
Odisha	18	Bhubaneswar	GEN	Aparajita Sarangi	Bharatiya Janata Party	4,86,991	Arup Patnaik	Biju Janata Dal	4,63,152	23,839	
Odisha	19	Aska	GEN	Pramila Bisoyi	Biju Janata Dal	5,52,749	Anita Subhadarshini	Bharatiya Janata Party	3,48,042	2,04,707	
Odisha	20	Berhampur	GEN	Chandra Sekhar Sahu	Biju Janata Dal	4,43,843	Bhrugu Baxipatra	Bharatiya Janata Party	3,48,999	94,844	
Odisha	21	Koraput	(ST)	Saptagiri Ulaka	INC	3,71,129	Kaushalya Hikaka	Biju Janata Dal	3,67,516	3,613	
Puducherry	1	Puducherry	GEN	V. Vaithilingam	INC	4,44,981	Narayanaswamy Kesavan	All India N.R. Congress	2,47,956	1,97,025	
Punjab	1	Gurdaspur	GEN	Sunny Deol	Bharatiya Janata Party	5,58,719	Sunil Kumar Jakhar	INC	4,76,260	82,459	
Punjab	2	Amritsar	GEN	Gurjeet Singh Aujla	INC	4,45,032	Hardeep Singh Puri	Bharatiya Janata Party	3,45,406	99,626	
Punjab	3	Khadoor Sahib	GEN	Jasbir Singh Gill	INC	4,59,710	Bibi Jagir Kaur	Shiromani Akali Dal	3,19,137	1,40,573	
Punjab	4	Jalandhar	(SC)	Santokh Singh Chaudhary	INC	3,85,712	Charanjit Singh Atwal	Shiromani Akali Dal	3,66,221	19,491	
Punjab	5	Hoshiarpur	(SC)	Som Prakash	Bharatiya Janata Party	4,21,320	Raj Kumar Chhabbewal	INC	3,72,790	48,530	
Punjab	6	Anandpur Sahib	GEN	Manish Tiwari	INC	4,28,045	Prem Singh Chandumajra	Shiromani Akali Dal	3,81,161	46,884	
Punjab	7	Ludhiana	GEN	Ravneet Singh Bittu	INC	3,83,795	Simarjit Singh Bains	Lok Insaaf Party	3,07,423	76,372	
Punjab	8	Fatehgarh Sahib	(SC)	Amar Singh	INC	4,11,651	Darbara Singh Guru	Shiromani Akali Dal	3,17,753	93,898	
Punjab	9	Faridkot	(SC)	Muhammad Sadiq	INC	4,19,065	Gulzar Singh Ranike	Shiromani Akali Dal	3,35,809	83,256	
Punjab	10	Ferozpur	GEN	Sukhbir Singh Badal	Shiromani Akali Dal	6,33,427	Sher Singh Ghubaya	INC	4,34,577	1,98,850	
Punjab	11	Bathinda	GEN	Harsimrat Kaur Badal	Shiromani Akali Dal	4,92,824	Amrinder Singh Raja Warring	INC	4,71,052	21,772	
Punjab	12	Sangrur	GEN	Bhagwant Mann	Aam Aadmi Party	4,13,561	Kewal Singh Dhillon	INC	3,03,350	1,10,211	
Punjab	13	Patiala	GEN	Preneet Kaur	INC	5,32,027	Surjit Singh Rakhra	Shiromani Akali Dal	3,69,309	1,62,718	
Rajasthan	1	Ganganagar	(SC)	Nihalchand	Bharatiya Janata Party	8,97,177	Bharat Ram Meghwal	INC	4,90,199	4,06,978	
Rajasthan	2	Bikaner	(SC)	Arjun Ram Meghwal	Bharatiya Janata Party	6,57,743	Madan Gopal Meghwal	INC	3,93,662	2,64,081	
Rajasthan	3	Churu	GEN	Rahul Kaswan	Bharatiya Janata Party	7,92,999	Rafique Mandelia	INC	4,58,597	3,34,402	
Rajasthan	4	Jhunjhunu	GEN	Narendra Kumar	Bharatiya Janata Party	7,38,163	Sharwan Kumar	INC	4,35,616	3,02,547	
Rajasthan	5	Sikar	GEN	Sumedhanand Saraswati	Bharatiya Janata Party	7,72,104	Subhash Maharia	INC	4,74,948	2,97,156	
Rajasthan	6	Jaipur Rural	GEN	Rajyavardhan Singh Rathore	Bharatiya Janata Party	8,20,132	Krishna Poonia	INC	4,26,961	3,93,171	
Rajasthan	7	Jaipur	GEN	Ramcharan Bohara	Bharatiya Janata Party	9,24,065	Jyoti Khandelwal	INC	4,93,439	4,30,626	
Rajasthan	8	Alwar	GEN	Balak Nath	Bharatiya Janata Party	7,60,201	Bhanwar Jitendra Singh	INC	4,30,230	3,29,971	
Rajasthan	9	Bharatpur	(SC)	Ranjeeta Koli	Bharatiya Janata Party	7,07,992	Abhijeet Kumar Jatav	INC	3,89,593	3,18,399	
Rajasthan	10	Karauli–Dholpur	(SC)	Manoj Rajoria	Bharatiya Janata Party	5,26,443	Sanjay Kumar	INC	4,28,761	97,682	
Rajasthan	11	Dausa	(ST)	Jaskaur Meena	Bharatiya Janata Party	5,48,733	Savita Meena	INC	4,70,289	78,444	
Rajasthan	12	Tonk–Sawai Madhopur	GEN	Sukhbir Singh Jaunapuria	Bharatiya Janata Party	6,44,319	Namo Narain Meena	INC	5,33,028	1,11,291	
Rajasthan	13	Ajmer	GEN	Bhagirath Choudhary	Bharatiya Janata Party	8,15,076	Riju Jhunjhunwala	INC	3,98,652	4,16,424	
Rajasthan	14	Nagaur	GEN	Hanuman Beniwal	Rashtriya Loktantrik Party	6,60,051	Jyoti Mirdha	INC	4,78,791	1,81,260	
Rajasthan	15	Pali	GEN	P P Chaudhary	Bharatiya Janata Party	9,00,149	Badri Ram Jakhar	INC	4,18,552	4,81,597	
Rajasthan	16	Jodhpur	GEN	Gajendra Singh Shekhawat	Bharatiya Janata Party	7,88,888	Vaibhav Gehlot	INC	5,14,448	2,74,440	
Rajasthan	17	Barmer	GEN	Kailash Choudhary	Bharatiya Janata Party	8,46,526	Manvendra Singh	INC	5,22,718	3,23,808	
Rajasthan	18	Jalore	(SC)	Devaji Patel	Bharatiya Janata Party	7,72,833	Ratan Dewasi	INC	5,11,723	2,61,110	
Rajasthan	19	Udaipur	(ST)	Arjunlal Meena	Bharatiya Janata Party	8,71,548	Raghuvir Singh Meena	INC	4,33,634	4,37,914	
Rajasthan	20	Banswara	(ST)	Kanak Mal Katara	Bharatiya Janata Party	7,11,709	Tarachand Bhagora	INC	4,06,245	3,05,464	
Rajasthan	21	Chittorgarh	GEN	Chandra Prakash Joshi	Bharatiya Janata Party	9,82,942	Gopal Singh Shekhawat	INC	4,06,695	5,76,247	
Rajasthan	22	Rajsamand	GEN	Diya Kumari	Bharatiya Janata Party	8,63,039	Devkinandan Kaka	INC	3,11,123	5,51,916	
Rajasthan	23	Bhilwara	GEN	Subhash Chandra Baheria	Bharatiya Janata Party	9,38,160	Ram Pal Sharma	INC	3,26,160	6,12,000	
Rajasthan	24	Kota	GEN	Om Birla	Bharatiya Janata Party	8,00,051	Ram Narain Meena	INC	5,20,374	2,79,677	
Rajasthan	25	Jhalawar–Baran	GEN	Dushyant Singh	Bharatiya Janata Party	8,87,400	Pramod Sharma	INC	4,33,472	4,53,928	
Sikkim	1	Sikkim	GEN	Indra Hang Subba	Sikkim Krantikari Morcha	1,66,922	Dek Bahadur Katwal	Sikkim Democratic Front	1,54,489	12,433	
Tamil Nadu	1	Thiruvallur	GEN	K. Jayakumar	INC	7,67,292	Ponnusamy Venugopal	All India Anna Dravida Munnetra Kazhagam	4,10,337	3,56,955	
Tamil Nadu	2	Chennai North	GEN	Kalanidhi Veeraswamy	Dravida Munnetra Kazhagam	5,90,986	R. Mohanraj	Desiya Murpokku Dravida Kazhagam	1,29,468	4,61,518	
Tamil Nadu	3	Chennai South	GEN	Thamizhachi Thangapandian	Dravida Munnetra Kazhagam	5,64,872	J. Jayavardhan	All India Anna Dravida Munnetra Kazhagam	3,02,649	2,62,223	
Tamil Nadu	4	Chennai Central	GEN	Dayanidhi Maran	Dravida Munnetra Kazhagam	4,48,911	Sam Paul S. R.	Pattali Makkal Katchi	1,47,391	3,01,520	
Tamil Nadu	5	Sriperumbudur	(SC)	T R Baalu	Dravida Munnetra Kazhagam	7,93,281	Vaithilingam A	Pattali Makkal Katchi	2,85,326	5,07,955	
Tamil Nadu	6	Kancheepuram	(SC)	G. Selvam	Dravida Munnetra Kazhagam	6,84,004	K. Maragatham	All India Anna Dravida Munnetra Kazhagam	3,97,372	2,86,632	
Tamil Nadu	7	Arakkonam	(SC)	S. Jagathrakshakan	Dravida Munnetra Kazhagam	6,72,190	A. K. Moorthy	Pattali Makkal Katchi	3,43,234	3,28,956	
Tamil Nadu	8	Vellore	(SC)	D. M. Kathir Anand	Dravida Munnetra Kazhagam	4,85,340	A. C. Shanmugam	All India Anna Dravida Munnetra Kazhagam	4,77,199	8,141	
Tamil Nadu	9	Krishnagiri	GEN	A. Chellakumar	INC	6,11,298	K. P. Munusamy	All India Anna Dravida Munnetra Kazhagam	4,54,533	1,56,765	
Tamil Nadu	10	Dharmapuri	GEN	Dr S Senthil Kumar	Dravida Munnetra Kazhagam	5,74,988	Anbumani Ramadoss	Pattali Makkal Katchi	5,04,235	70,753	
Tamil Nadu	11	Tiruvannamalai	GEN	C. N. Annadurai	Dravida Munnetra Kazhagam	6,66,272	Agri Krishnamurthy S S	All India Anna Dravida Munnetra Kazhagam	3,62,085	3,04,187	
Tamil Nadu	12	Arani	GEN	M. K. Vishnu Prasad	INC	6,17,760	V. Elumalai	All India Anna Dravida Munnetra Kazhagam	3,86,954	2,30,806	
Tamil Nadu	13	Viluppuram	GEN	D. Ravikumar	Dravida Munnetra Kazhagam	5,59,585	Vadivel Ravanan	Pattali Makkal Katchi	4,31,517	1,28,068	
Tamil Nadu	14	Kallakurichi	GEN	Gautham Sigamani Pon	Dravida Munnetra Kazhagam	7,21,713	Sudhish L K	Desiya Murpokku Dravida Kazhagam	3,21,794	3,99,919	
Tamil Nadu	15	Salem	GEN	S. R. Parthiban	Dravida Munnetra Kazhagam	6,06,302	K. R. S. Saravanan	All India Anna Dravida Munnetra Kazhagam	4,59,376	1,46,926	
Tamil Nadu	16	Namakkal	GEN	A.K.P. Chinraj	Dravida Munnetra Kazhagam	6,26,293	Kaliappan	All India Anna Dravida Munnetra Kazhagam	3,61,142	2,65,151	
Tamil Nadu	17	Erode	GEN	A. Ganeshamurthi	Dravida Munnetra Kazhagam	5,63,591	G. Manimaran	All India Anna Dravida Munnetra Kazhagam	3,52,973	2,10,618	
Tamil Nadu	18	Tiruppur	GEN	K. Subbarayan	Communist Party of India	5,08,725	M. S. M. Anandan	All India Anna Dravida Munnetra Kazhagam	4,15,357	93,368	
Tamil Nadu	19	Nilgiris	GEN	A. Raja	Dravida Munnetra Kazhagam	5,47,832	Thiyagarajan M.	All India Anna Dravida Munnetra Kazhagam	3,42,009	2,05,823	
Tamil Nadu	20	Coimbatore	GEN	P.R. Natarajan	Communist Party of India (Marxist)	5,71,150	C. P. Radhakrishnan	Bharatiya Janata Party	3,92,007	1,79,143	
Tamil Nadu	21	Pollachi	GEN	K. Shamugasundaram	Dravida Munnetra Kazhagam	5,54,230	C. Mahendran	All India Anna Dravida Munnetra Kazhagam	3,78,347	1,75,883	
Tamil Nadu	22	Dindigul	GEN	P. Veluchamy	Dravida Munnetra Kazhagam	7,46,523	K. Jothimuthu	Pattali Makkal Katchi	2,07,551	5,38,972	
Tamil Nadu	23	Karur	GEN	S.Jothimani	INC	6,95,697	M. Thambidurai	All India Anna Dravida Munnetra Kazhagam	2,75,151	4,20,546	
Tamil Nadu	24	Tiruchirappalli	GEN	Su. Thirunavukkarasar	INC	6,21,285	V. Elangovan	Desiya Murpokku Dravida Kazhagam	1,61,999	4,59,286	
Tamil Nadu	25	Perambalur	GEN	T. R. Paarivendhar	Dravida Munnetra Kazhagam	6,83,697	N. R. Sivapathi	All India Anna Dravida Munnetra Kazhagam	2,80,179	4,03,518	
Tamil Nadu	26	Cuddalore	GEN	T.R.V.S. Ramesh	Dravida Munnetra Kazhagam	5,22,160	R. Govindasamy	Pattali Makkal Katchi	3,78,177	1,43,983	
Tamil Nadu	27	Chidambaram	(SC)	Thol. Thirumavalavan	Viduthalai Chiruthaigal Katchi	5,00,229	Chandrasekar P.	All India Anna Dravida Munnetra Kazhagam	4,97,010	3,219	
Tamil Nadu	28	Mayiladuthurai	GEN	S. Ramalingam	Dravida Munnetra Kazhagam	5,99,292	Asaimani S	All India Anna Dravida Munnetra Kazhagam	3,37,978	2,61,314	
Tamil Nadu	29	Nagapattinam	(SC)	M. Selvaraj	Communist Party of India	5,22,892	M. Saravanan	All India Anna Dravida Munnetra Kazhagam	3,11,539	2,11,353	
Tamil Nadu	30	Thanjavur	(SC)	S S Palanimanickam	Dravida Munnetra Kazhagam	5,88,978	N. V. Natarajan	Tamil Maanila Congress (M)	2,20,849	3,68,129	
Tamil Nadu	31	Sivaganga	GEN	Karti P Chidambaram	INC	5,66,104	H. Raja	Bharatiya Janata Party	2,33,860	3,32,244	
Tamil Nadu	32	Madurai	GEN	S. Venkatesan	Communist Party of India (Marxist)	4,47,075	Raj Satyen V. V. R.	All India Anna Dravida Munnetra Kazhagam	3,07,680	1,39,395	
Tamil Nadu	33	Theni	GEN	P. Raveendranath Kumar	All India Anna Dravida Munnetra Kazhagam	5,04,813	E. V. K. S. Elangovan	INC	4,28,120	76,693	
Tamil Nadu	34	Virudhunagar	GEN	Manickam Tagore	INC	4,70,883	Alagarsamy	Desiya Murpokku Dravida Kazhagam	3,16,329	1,54,554	
Tamil Nadu	35	Ramanathapuram	GEN	Navaskani	Indian Union Muslim League	4,69,943	Nainar Nagendran	Bharatiya Janata Party	3,42,821	1,27,122	
Tamil Nadu	36	Thoothukkudi	GEN	Kanimozhi	Dravida Munnetra Kazhagam	5,63,143	Tamilisai Soundararajan	Bharatiya Janata Party	2,15,934	3,47,209	
Tamil Nadu	37	Tenkasi	GEN	Dhanush M. Kumar	Dravida Munnetra Kazhagam	4,76,156	K. Krishnasamy	All India Anna Dravida Munnetra Kazhagam	3,55,870	1,20,286	
Tamil Nadu	38	Tirunelveli	GEN	S. Gnanathiraviam	Dravida Munnetra Kazhagam	5,22,623	P. H. Paul Manoj Pandian	All India Anna Dravida Munnetra Kazhagam	3,37,166	1,85,457	
Tamil Nadu	39	Kanyakumari	GEN	H. Vasanthakumar	INC	6,27,235	Pon Radhakrishnan	Bharatiya Janata Party	3,67,302	2,59,933	
Telangana	1	Adilabad	(ST)	Soyam Bapu Rao	Bharatiya Janata Party	3,77,374	Godam Nagesh	Telangana Rashtra Samithi	3,18,814	58,560	
Telangana	2	Peddapalli	(SC)	Venkatesh Netha Borlakunta	Telangana Rashtra Samithi	4,41,321	Agam Chandrasekhar	INC	3,46,141	95,180	
Telangana	3	Karimnagar	GEN	Bandi Sanjay Kumar	Bharatiya Janata Party	4,98,276	Boianapalli Vinod Kumar	Telangana Rashtra Samithi	4,08,768	89,508	
Telangana	4	Nizamabad	GEN	Arvind Dharmapuri	Bharatiya Janata Party	4,80,584	Kalvakuntla Kavitha	Telangana Rashtra Samithi	4,09,709	70,875	
Telangana	5	Zahirabad	GEN	B. B. Patil	Telangana Rashtra Samithi	4,34,244	Madan Mohan Rao	INC	4,28,015	6,229	
Telangana	6	Medak	GEN	Kotha Prabhakar Reddy	Telangana Rashtra Samithi	5,96,048	Anil Kumar Gali	INC	2,79,621	3,16,427	
Telangana	7	Malkajgiri	GEN	Anumula Revanth Reddy	INC	6,03,748	Marri Rajasekhar Reddy	Telangana Rashtra Samithi	5,92,829	10,919	
Telangana	8	Secunderabad	GEN	G. Kishan Reddy	Bharatiya Janata Party	3,84,780	Talasani Sai Kiran Yadav	Telangana Rashtra Samithi	3,22,666	62,114	
Telangana	9	Hyderabad	GEN	Asaduddin Owaisi	All India Majlis-e-Ittehadul Muslimeen	5,17,471	Bhagavanth Rao	Bharatiya Janata Party	2,35,285	2,82,186	
Telangana	10	Chevella	GEN	G. Ranjith Reddy	Telangana Rashtra Samithi	5,28,148	Konda Vishweshwar Reddy	INC	5,13,831	14,317	
Telangana	11	Mahbubnagar	GEN	Manne Srinivas Reddy	Telangana Rashtra Samithi	4,11,402	D. K. Aruna	Bharatiya Janata Party	3,33,573	77,829	
Telangana	12	Nagarkurnool	(SC)	Pothuganti Ramulu	Telangana Rashtra Samithi	4,99,672	Mallu Ravi	INC	3,09,924	1,89,748	
Telangana	13	Nalgonda	GEN	Nalamada Uttam Kumar Reddy	INC	5,26,028	Vemireddy Narasimha Reddy	Telangana Rashtra Samithi	5,00,346	25,682	
Telangana	14	Bhongir	GEN	Komatireddy Venkat Reddy	INC	5,32,795	Boora Narsaiah Goud	Telangana Rashtra Samithi	5,27,576	5,219	
Telangana	15	Warangal	(SC)	Dayakar Pasunoori	Telangana Rashtra Samithi	6,12,498	Dommati Sambaiah	INC	2,62,200	3,50,298	
Telangana	16	Mahabubabad	(ST)	Kavitha Maloth	Telangana Rashtra Samithi	4,62,109	Balaram Naik Porika	INC	3,15,446	1,46,663	
Telangana	17	Khammam	GEN	Nama Nageswara Rao	Telangana Rashtra Samithi	5,67,459	Renuka Chowdhury	INC	3,99,397	1,68,062	
Tripura	1	Tripura West	GEN	Pratima Bhowmik	Bharatiya Janata Party	5,73,532	Subal Bhowmick	INC	2,67,843	3,05,689	
Tripura	2	Tripura East	(ST)	Rebati Tripura	Bharatiya Janata Party	4,82,126	Pragya Deb Burman	INC	2,77,836	2,04,290	
Uttar Pradesh	1	Saharanpur	GEN	Haji Fazlur Rehman	Bahujan Samaj Party	5,14,139	Raghav Lakhanpal	Bharatiya Janata Party	4,91,722	22,417	
Uttar Pradesh	2	Kairana	GEN	Pradeep Kumar Choudhary	Bharatiya Janata Party	5,66,961	Begum Tabassum Hasan	Samajwadi Party	4,74,801	92,160	
Uttar Pradesh	3	Muzaffarnagar	GEN	Sanjeev Kumar Balyan	Bharatiya Janata Party	5,73,780	Ajit Singh	Rashtriya Lok Dal	5,67,254	6,526	
Uttar Pradesh	4	Bijnor	GEN	Malook Nagar	Bahujan Samaj Party	5,61,045	Bharatendra Singh	Bharatiya Janata Party	4,91,104	69,941	
Uttar Pradesh	5	Nagina	(SC)	Girish Chandra	Bahujan Samaj Party	5,68,378	Yashwant Singh	Bharatiya Janata Party	4,01,546	1,66,832	
Uttar Pradesh	6	Moradabad	GEN	S. T. Hasan	Samajwadi Party	6,49,416	Kunwar Sarvesh Kumar Singh	Bharatiya Janata Party	5,51,538	97,878	
Uttar Pradesh	7	Rampur	GEN	Azam Khan	Samajwadi Party	5,59,177	Jaya Prada	Bharatiya Janata Party	4,49,180	1,09,997	
Uttar Pradesh	8	Sambhal	GEN	Shafiqur Rehman Barq	Samajwadi Party	6,58,006	Parameshwar Lal Saini	Bharatiya Janata Party	4,83,180	1,74,826	
Uttar Pradesh	9	Amroha	GEN	Kunwar Danish Ali	Bahujan Samaj Party	6,01,082	Kanwar Singh Tanwar	Bharatiya Janata Party	5,37,834	63,248	
Uttar Pradesh	10	Meerut	GEN	Rajendra Agrawal	Bharatiya Janata Party	5,86,184	Hazi Mohammad Yakoob	Bahujan Samaj Party	5,81,455	4,729	
Uttar Pradesh	11	Baghpat	GEN	Satya Pal Singh	Bharatiya Janata Party	5,25,789	Jayant Chaudhary	Rashtriya Lok Dal	5,02,287	23,502	
Uttar Pradesh	12	Ghaziabad	GEN	General Vijay Kumar Singh	Bharatiya Janata Party	9,44,503	Suresh Bansal	Samajwadi Party	4,43,003	5,01,500	
Uttar Pradesh	13	Gautam Buddh Nagar	GEN	Mahesh Sharma	Bharatiya Janata Party	8,30,812	Satveer Singh Gurjar	Bahujan Samaj Party	4,93,890	3,36,922	
Uttar Pradesh	14	Bulandshahr	(SC)	Bhola Singh	Bharatiya Janata Party	6,81,321	Yogesh Verma	Bahujan Samaj Party	3,91,264	2,90,057	
Uttar Pradesh	15	Aligarh	GEN	Satish Kumar Gautam	Bharatiya Janata Party	6,56,215	Ajeet Baliyan	Bahujan Samaj Party	4,26,954	2,29,261	
Uttar Pradesh	16	Hathras	(SC)	Rajvir Singh Diler	Bharatiya Janata Party	6,84,299	Ram Ji Lal Suman	Samajwadi Party	4,24,091	2,60,208	
Uttar Pradesh	17	Mathura	GEN	Hema Malini	Bharatiya Janata Party	6,71,293	Kunwar Narendra Singh	Rashtriya Lok Dal	3,77,822	2,93,471	
Uttar Pradesh	18	Agra	(SC)	Satya Pal Singh Baghel	Bharatiya Janata Party	6,46,875	Manoj Kumar Soni	Bahujan Samaj Party	4,35,329	2,11,546	
Uttar Pradesh	19	Fatehpur Sikri	GEN	Rajkumar Chahar	Bharatiya Janata Party	6,67,147	Raj Babbar	INC	1,72,082	4,95,065	
Uttar Pradesh	20	Firozabad	GEN	Chandra Sen Jadon	Bharatiya Janata Party	4,95,819	Akshay Yadav	Samajwadi Party	4,67,038	28,781	
Uttar Pradesh	21	Mainpuri	GEN	Mulayam Singh Yadav	Samajwadi Party	5,24,926	Prem Singh Shakya	Bharatiya Janata Party	4,30,537	94,389	
Uttar Pradesh	22	Etah	GEN	Rajveer Singh	Bharatiya Janata Party	5,45,348	Devendra Singh Yadav	Samajwadi Party	4,22,678	1,22,670	
Uttar Pradesh	23	Badaun	GEN	Sanghmitra Maurya	Bharatiya Janata Party	5,11,352	Dharmendra Yadav	Samajwadi Party	4,92,898	18,454	
Uttar Pradesh	24	Aonla	GEN	Dharmendra Kashyap	Bharatiya Janata Party	5,37,675	Ruchi Veera	Bahujan Samaj Party	4,23,932	1,13,743	
Uttar Pradesh	25	Bareilly	GEN	Santosh Kumar Gangwar	Bharatiya Janata Party	5,65,270	Bhagwat Saran Gangwar	Samajwadi Party	3,97,988	1,67,282	
Uttar Pradesh	26	Pilibhit	GEN	Varun Gandhi	Bharatiya Janata Party	7,04,549	Hemraj Verma	Samajwadi Party	4,48,922	2,55,627	
Uttar Pradesh	27	Shahjahanpur	(SC)	Arun Kumar Sagar	Bharatiya Janata Party	6,88,990	Amar Chandra Jauhar	Bahujan Samaj Party	4,20,572	2,68,418	
Uttar Pradesh	28	Kheri	GEN	Ajay Kumar Mishra	Bharatiya Janata Party	6,09,589	Purvi Verma	Samajwadi Party	3,90,782	2,18,807	
Uttar Pradesh	29	Dhaurahra	GEN	Rekha Verma	Bharatiya Janata Party	5,12,905	Arshad Iliyas Siddiqui	Bahujan Samaj Party	3,52,294	1,60,611	
Uttar Pradesh	30	Sitapur	GEN	Rajesh Verma	Bharatiya Janata Party	5,14,528	Nakul Dubey	Bahujan Samaj Party	4,13,695	1,00,833	
Uttar Pradesh	31	Hardoi	(SC)	Jai Prakash Rawat	Bharatiya Janata Party	5,68,143	Usha Verma	Samajwadi Party	4,35,669	1,32,474	
Uttar Pradesh	32	Misrikh	(SC)	Ashok Kumar Rawat	Bharatiya Janata Party	5,34,429	Neelu Satyarthi	Bahujan Samaj Party	4,33,757	1,00,672	
Uttar Pradesh	33	Unnao	GEN	Sakshi Maharaj	Bharatiya Janata Party	7,03,507	Arun Shankar Shukla	Samajwadi Party	3,02,551	4,00,956	
Uttar Pradesh	34	Mohanlalganj	(SC)	Kaushal Kishore	Bharatiya Janata Party	6,29,748	C. L. Verma	Bahujan Samaj Party	5,39,519	90,229	
Uttar Pradesh	35	Lucknow	GEN	Rajnath Singh	Bharatiya Janata Party	6,33,026	Poonam Sinha	Samajwadi Party	2,85,724	3,47,302	
Uttar Pradesh	36	Rae Bareli	GEN	Sonia Gandhi	INC	5,34,918	Dinesh Pratap Singh	Bharatiya Janata Party	3,67,740	1,67,178	
Uttar Pradesh	37	Amethi	GEN	Smriti Irani	Bharatiya Janata Party	4,68,514	Rahul Gandhi	INC	4,13,394	55,120	
Uttar Pradesh	38	Sultanpur	GEN	Maneka Gandhi	Bharatiya Janata Party	4,59,196	Chandrabhadra Singh	Bahujan Samaj Party	4,44,670	14,526	
Uttar Pradesh	39	Pratapgarh	GEN	Sangam Lal Gupta	Bharatiya Janata Party	4,36,291	Ashok Tripathi	Bahujan Samaj Party	3,18,539	1,17,752	
Uttar Pradesh	40	Farrukhabad	GEN	Mukesh Rajput	Bharatiya Janata Party	5,69,880	Manoj Agarwal	Bahujan Samaj Party	3,48,178	2,21,702	
Uttar Pradesh	41	Etawah	(SC)	Ram Shankar Katheria	Bharatiya Janata Party	5,22,119	Kamlesh Kumar Katheria	Samajwadi Party	4,57,682	64,437	
Uttar Pradesh	42	Kannauj	GEN	Subrat Pathak	Bharatiya Janata Party	5,63,087	Dimple Yadav	Samajwadi Party	5,50,734	12,353	
Uttar Pradesh	43	Kanpur Urban	GEN	Satyadev Pachauri	Bharatiya Janata Party	4,68,937	Sriprakash Jaiswal	INC	3,13,003	1,55,934	
Uttar Pradesh	44	Akbarpur	GEN	Devendra Singh Bhole	Bharatiya Janata Party	5,81,282	Nisha Sachan	Bahujan Samaj Party	3,06,140	2,75,142	
Uttar Pradesh	45	Jalaun	(SC)	Bhanu Pratap Singh Verma	Bharatiya Janata Party	5,81,763	Ajay Singh 'Pankaj'	Bahujan Samaj Party	4,23,386	1,58,377	
Uttar Pradesh	46	Jhansi	GEN	Anurag Sharma	Bharatiya Janata Party	8,09,272	Shyam Sundar Singh Yadav	Samajwadi Party	4,43,589	3,65,683	
Uttar Pradesh	47	Hamirpur	GEN	Pushpendra Singh Chandel	Bharatiya Janata Party	5,75,122	Dilip Kumar Singh	Bahujan Samaj Party	3,26,470	2,48,652	
Uttar Pradesh	48	Banda	GEN	R. K. Singh Patel	Bharatiya Janata Party	4,77,926	Shyama Charan Gupta	Samajwadi Party	4,18,988	58,938	
Uttar Pradesh	49	Fatehpur	GEN	Niranjan Jyoti	Bharatiya Janata Party	5,66,040	Sukhdev Prasad Verma	Bahujan Samaj Party	3,67,835	1,98,205	
Uttar Pradesh	50	Kaushambi	(SC)	Vinod Kumar Sonkar	Bharatiya Janata Party	3,83,009	Indrajit Saroj	Samajwadi Party	3,44,287	38,722	
Uttar Pradesh	51	Phulpur	GEN	Keshari Devi Patel	Bharatiya Janata Party	5,44,701	Pandhari Yadav	Samajwadi Party	3,72,733	1,71,968	
Uttar Pradesh	52	Allahabad	GEN	Rita Bahuguna Joshi	Bharatiya Janata Party	4,94,454	Rajendra Patel	Samajwadi Party	3,10,179	1,84,275	
Uttar Pradesh	53	Barabanki	(SC)	Upendra Singh Rawat	Bharatiya Janata Party	5,35,917	Ram Sagar Rawat	Samajwadi Party	4,25,777	1,10,140	
Uttar Pradesh	54	Faizabad	GEN	Lallu Singh	Bharatiya Janata Party	5,29,021	Anand Sen Yadav	Samajwadi Party	4,63,544	65,477	
Uttar Pradesh	55	Ambedkar Nagar	GEN	Ritesh Pandey	Bahujan Samaj Party	5,64,118	Mukut Bihari Verma	Bharatiya Janata Party	4,68,238	95,880	
Uttar Pradesh	56	Bahraich	(SC)	Akshaybara Lal Gaud	Bharatiya Janata Party	5,25,982	Shabbir Balmiki	Samajwadi Party	3,97,230	1,28,752	
Uttar Pradesh	57	Kaiserganj	GEN	Brij Bhushan Sharan Singh	Bharatiya Janata Party	5,81,358	Chandradev Ram Yadav	Bahujan Samaj Party	3,19,757	2,61,601	
Uttar Pradesh	58	Shrawasti	GEN	Ram Shiromani Verma	Bahujan Samaj Party	4,41,771	Daddan Mishra	Bharatiya Janata Party	4,36,451	5,320	
Uttar Pradesh	59	Gonda	GEN	Kirti Vardhan Singh	Bharatiya Janata Party	5,08,190	Pandit Singh	Samajwadi Party	3,41,830	1,66,360	
Uttar Pradesh	60	Domariyaganj	GEN	Jagdambika Pal	Bharatiya Janata Party	4,92,253	Aftab Alam	Bahujan Samaj Party	3,86,932	1,05,321	
Uttar Pradesh	61	Basti	GEN	Harish Dwivedi	Bharatiya Janata Party	4,71,162	Ram Prasad Chaudhary	Bahujan Samaj Party	4,40,808	30,354	
Uttar Pradesh	62	Sant Kabir Nagar	GEN	Praveen Kumar Nishad	Bharatiya Janata Party	4,67,543	Bhishma Shankar Tiwari	Bahujan Samaj Party	4,31,794	35,749	
Uttar Pradesh	63	Maharajganj	GEN	Pankaj Choudhary	Bharatiya Janata Party	7,26,349	Akhilesh Kumar Singh	Samajwadi Party	3,85,925	3,40,424	
Uttar Pradesh	64	Gorakhpur	GEN	Ravi Kishan	Bharatiya Janata Party	7,17,122	Rambhual Nishad	Samajwadi Party	4,15,458	3,01,664	
Uttar Pradesh	65	Kushi Nagar	GEN	Vijay Kumar Dubey	Bharatiya Janata Party	5,97,039	Nathuni Prasad Kushwaha	Samajwadi Party	2,59,479	3,37,560	
Uttar Pradesh	66	Deoria	GEN	Ramapati Ram Tripathi	Bharatiya Janata Party	5,80,644	Binod Kumar Jaiswal	Bahujan Samaj Party	3,30,713	2,49,931	
Uttar Pradesh	67	Bansgaon	(SC)	Kamlesh Paswan	Bharatiya Janata Party	5,46,673	Sadal Prasad	Bahujan Samaj Party	3,93,205	1,53,468	
Uttar Pradesh	68	Lalganj	(SC)	Sangeeta Azad	Bahujan Samaj Party	5,18,820	Neelam Sonkar	Bharatiya Janata Party	3,57,223	1,61,597	
Uttar Pradesh	69	Azamgarh	GEN	Akhilesh Yadav	Samajwadi Party	6,21,578	Dinesh Lal Yadav 'Nirahua'	Bharatiya Janata Party	3,61,704	2,59,874	
Uttar Pradesh	70	Ghosi	GEN	Atul Rai	Bahujan Samaj Party	5,73,829	Harinarayan Rajbhar	Bharatiya Janata Party	4,51,261	1,22,568	
Uttar Pradesh	71	Salempur	GEN	Ravindra Kushawaha	Bharatiya Janata Party	4,67,241	R. S. Kushwaha	Bahujan Samaj Party	3,54,764	1,12,477	
Uttar Pradesh	72	Ballia	GEN	Virendra Singh Mast	Bharatiya Janata Party	4,69,114	Sanatan Pandey	Samajwadi Party	4,53,595	15,519	
Uttar Pradesh	73	Jaunpur	GEN	Shyam Singh Yadav	Bahujan Samaj Party	5,21,128	Krishna Pratap	Bharatiya Janata Party	4,40,192	80,936	
Uttar Pradesh	74	Machhlishahr	(SC)	B. P. Saroj	Bharatiya Janata Party	4,88,397	Tribhuvan Ram	Bahujan Samaj Party	4,88,216	181	
Uttar Pradesh	75	Ghazipur	GEN	Afzal Ansari	Bahujan Samaj Party	5,66,082	Manoj Sinha	Bharatiya Janata Party	4,46,690	1,19,392	
Uttar Pradesh	76	Chandauli	GEN	Mahendra Nath Pandey	Bharatiya Janata Party	5,10,733	Sanjay Singh Chauhan	Samajwadi Party	4,96,774	13,959	
Uttar Pradesh	77	Varanasi	GEN	Narendra Modi	Bharatiya Janata Party	6,74,664	Shalini Yadav	Samajwadi Party	1,95,159	4,79,505	
Uttar Pradesh	78	Bhadohi	GEN	Ramesh Chand Bind	Bharatiya Janata Party	5,10,029	Rangnath Mishra	Bahujan Samaj Party	4,66,414	43,615	
Uttar Pradesh	79	Mirzapur	GEN	Anupriya Patel	Apna Dal (Sonelal)	5,91,564	Ram Charitra Nishad	Samajwadi Party	3,59,556	2,32,008	
Uttar Pradesh	80	Robertsganj	(SC)	Pakauri Lal	Apna Dal (Sonelal)	4,47,914	Bhai Lal	Samajwadi Party	3,93,578	54,336	
Uttarakhand	1	Tehri Garhwal	GEN	Mala Rajya Laxmi Shah	BJP	5,65,333	Pritam Singh	INC	2,64,747	3,00,586	
Uttarakhand	2	Garhwal	GEN	Tirath Singh Rawat	BJP	5,06,980	Manish Khanduri	INC	2,04,311	3,02,669	
Uttarakhand	3	Almora	(SC)	Ajay Tamta	BJP	4,44,651	Pradeep Tamta	INC	2,11,665	2,32,986	
Uttarakhand	4	Nainital–Udhamsingh Nagar	GEN	Ajay Bhatt	BJP	7,72,195	Harish Rawat	INC	4,33,099	3,39,096	
Uttarakhand	5	Haridwar	GEN	Ramesh Pokhriyal	BJP	6,65,674	Ambrish Kumar	INC	4,06,945	2,58,729	
West Bengal	1	Cooch Behar	(SC)	Nisith Pramanik	BJP	7,31,594	Adhikari Paresh Chandra	TMC	6,77,363	54,231	
West Bengal	2	Alipurduars	(SC)	John Barla	BJP	7,50,804	Dasrath Tirkey	TMC	5,06,815	2,43,989	
West Bengal	3	Jalpaiguri	(SC)	Jayanta Kumar Roy	BJP	7,60,145	Bijoy Chandra Barman	TMC	5,76,141	1,84,004	
West Bengal	4	Darjeeling	GEN	Raju Singh Bisht	BJP	7,50,067	Amar Singh Rai	TMC	3,36,624	4,13,443	
West Bengal	5	Raiganj	GEN	Debasree Chaudhuri	BJP	5,11,652	Kanaiyalal Agarwal	TMC	4,51,078	60,574	
West Bengal	6	Balurghat	GEN	Sukanta Majumder	BJP	5,39,317	Arpita Ghosh	TMC	5,06,024	33,293	
West Bengal	7	Maldaha Uttar	GEN	Khagen Murmu	BJP	5,09,524	Mausam Noor	TMC	4,25,236	84,288	
West Bengal	8	Maldaha Dakshin	GEN	Abu Hasem Khan Choudhury	INC	4,44,270	Sreerupa Mitra Chaudhury	BJP	4,36,048	8,222	
West Bengal	9	Jangipur	GEN	Khalilur Rahman	TMC	5,62,838	Mafuja Khatun	BJP	3,17,056	2,45,782	
West Bengal	10	Baharampur	GEN	Adhir Ranjan Chowdhury	INC	5,91,106	Apurba Sarkar	TMC	5,10,410	80,696	
West Bengal	11	Murshidabad	GEN	Abu Taher Khan	TMC	6,04,346	Abu Hena	INC	3,77,929	2,26,417	
West Bengal	12	Krishnanagar	GEN	Mahua Moitra	TMC	6,14,872	Kalyan Chaubey	BJP	5,51,654	63,218	
West Bengal	13	Ranaghat	(SC)	Jagannath Sarkar	BJP	7,83,253	Rupali Biswas	TMC	5,49,825	2,33,428	
West Bengal	14	Bangaon	(SC)	Shantanu Thakur	BJP	6,87,622	Mamata Bala Thakur	TMC	5,76,028	1,11,594	
West Bengal	15	Barrackpore	GEN	Arjun Singh	BJP	4,72,994	Dinesh Trivedi	TMC	4,58,137	14,857	
West Bengal	16	Dum Dum	GEN	Saugata Roy	TMC	5,12,062	Samik Bhattacharya	BJP	4,59,060	53,002	
West Bengal	17	Barasat	GEN	Kakali Ghosh Dastidar	TMC	6,48,084	Mrinal Kanti Debnath	BJP	5,38,101	1,09,983	
West Bengal	18	Basirhat	GEN	Nusrat Jahan	TMC	7,82,078	Sayantan Basu	BJP	4,31,709	3,50,369	
West Bengal	19	Jaynagar	(SC)	Pratima Mondal	TMC	7,61,202	Ashok Kandary	BJP	4,44,427	3,16,775	
West Bengal	20	Mathurapur	(SC)	Choudhury Mohan Jatua	TMC	7,26,828	Shyama Prasad Halder	BJP	5,22,854	2,03,974	
West Bengal	21	Diamond Harbour	GEN	Abhishek Banerjee	TMC	7,91,127	Nilanjan Roy	BJP	4,70,533	3,20,594	
West Bengal	22	Jadavpur	GEN	Mimi Chakraborty	TMC	6,88,472	Anupam Hazra	BJP	3,93,233	2,95,239	
West Bengal	23	Kolkata Dakshin	GEN	Mala Roy	TMC	5,73,119	Chandra Kumar Bose	BJP	4,17,927	1,55,192	
West Bengal	24	Kolkata Uttar	GEN	Sudip Bandyopadhyay	TMC	4,74,891	Rahul Sinha	BJP	3,47,796	1,27,095	
West Bengal	25	Howrah	GEN	Prasun Banerjee	TMC	5,76,711	Rantidev Sen Gupta	BJP	4,73,016	1,03,695	
West Bengal	26	Uluberia	GEN	Sajda Ahmed	TMC	6,94,945	Joy Banerjee	BJP	4,79,586	2,15,359	
West Bengal	27	Serampore	GEN	Kalyan Banerjee	TMC	6,37,707	Debjit Sarkar	BJP	5,39,171	98,536	
West Bengal	28	Hooghly	GEN	Locket Chatterjee	BJP	6,71,448	Ratna De	TMC	5,98,086	73,362	
West Bengal	29	Arambagh	(SC)	Aparupa Poddar	TMC	6,49,929	Tapan Kumar Ray	BJP	6,48,787	1,142	
West Bengal	30	Tamluk	GEN	Dibyendu Adhikari	TMC	7,24,433	Sidhartha Shankar Naskar	BJP	5,34,268	1,90,165	
West Bengal	31	Kanthi	GEN	Sisir Adhikari	TMC	7,11,872	Debasish Samanta	BJP	6,00,204	1,11,668	
West Bengal	32	Ghatal	GEN	Deepak Adhikari (Dev)	TMC	7,17,959	Bharati Ghosh	BJP	6,09,986	1,07,973	
West Bengal	33	Jhargram	(ST)	Kumar Hembram	BJP	6,26,583	Birbaha Saren	TMC	6,14,816	11,767	
West Bengal	34	Medinipur	GEN	Dilip Ghosh	BJP	6,85,433	Manas Bhunia	TMC	5,96,481	88,952	
West Bengal	35	Purulia	GEN	Jyotirmoy Singh Mahato	BJP	6,68,107	Mriganko Mahato	TMC	4,63,375	2,04,732	
West Bengal	36	Bankura	GEN	Subhash Sarkar	BJP	6,75,319	Subrata Mukherjee	TMC	5,00,986	1,74,333	
West Bengal	37	Bishnupur	(SC)	Saumitra Khan	BJP	6,57,019	Shyamal Santra	TMC	5,78,972	78,047	
West Bengal	38	Bardhaman Purba	(SC)	Sunil Kumar Mondal	TMC	6,40,834	Paresh Chandra Das	BJP	5,51,523	89,311	
West Bengal	39	Bardhaman-Durgapur	GEN	S. S. Ahluwalia	BJP	5,98,376	Mamtaz Sanghamita	TMC	5,95,937	2,439	
West Bengal	40	Asansol	GEN	Babul Supriyo	BJP	6,33,378	Moon Moon Sen	TMC	4,35,741	1,97,637	
West Bengal	41	Bolpur	(SC)	Asit Kumar Mal	TMC	6,99,171	Ramprasad Das	BJP	5,92,769	1,06,402	
West Bengal	42	Birbhum	GEN	Shatabdi Roy	TMC	6,54,077	Dudh Kumar Mondal	BJP	5,65,153	88,924	

=== Outgoing Cabinet Minister to lose in the election ===
- Anant Geete – Minister of Heavy Industries and Public Enterprises (Raigad) Shiv Sena

=== Outgoing Ministers of State to lose in the election ===
- Manoj Sinha - Minister of State for Communications (Independent charge) (Ghazipur) BJP
- Alphons Kannanthanam - Minister of State for Electronics and IT and Minister of State for Tourism (Independent charge) (Ernakulam) BJP
- Hardeep Singh Puri - Minister of State for Housing and Urban Poverty Alleviation (Amritsar) BJP
- Hansraj Gangaram Ahir - Minister of State for Home Affairs (Chandrapur)
- Pon Radhakrishnan - Minister of State for Finance (Kanyakumari) BJP

=== Former Prime Minister to lose in the election ===
- H. D. Deve Gowda (JD-S)- Prime Minister of India from 1996–1997 lost from Tumkur of Karnataka

=== Former Chief Ministers to lose in the election ===
- H. D. Deve Gowda - Karnataka (Tumkur) JD(S)
- Sheila Dikshit - Delhi (North East Delhi) INC
- Digvijaya Singh - Madhya Pradesh (Bhopal) INC
- Sushil Kumar Shinde - Maharashtra (Solapur) INC
- Ashok Chavan - Maharashtra (Nanded) INC
- Harish Rawat - Uttarakhand (Nainital–Udhamsingh Nagar) INC
- Bhupinder Singh Hooda - Haryana (Sonipat) INC
- Veerappa Moily - Karnataka (Chikkballapur) INC
- Mukul Sangma - Meghalaya (Tura) INC
- Nabam Tuki - Arunachal Pradesh (Arunachal West) INC
- Shibu Soren - Jharkhand (Dumka) JMM
- Jitan Ram Manjhi - Bihar (Gaya) HAM
- Babu Lal Marandi - Jharkhand (Kodarma) JVM(P)
- Mehbooba Mufti - Jammu and Kashmir (Anantnag) PDP
