= Paina =

पैना पैना
- Village
- Paina
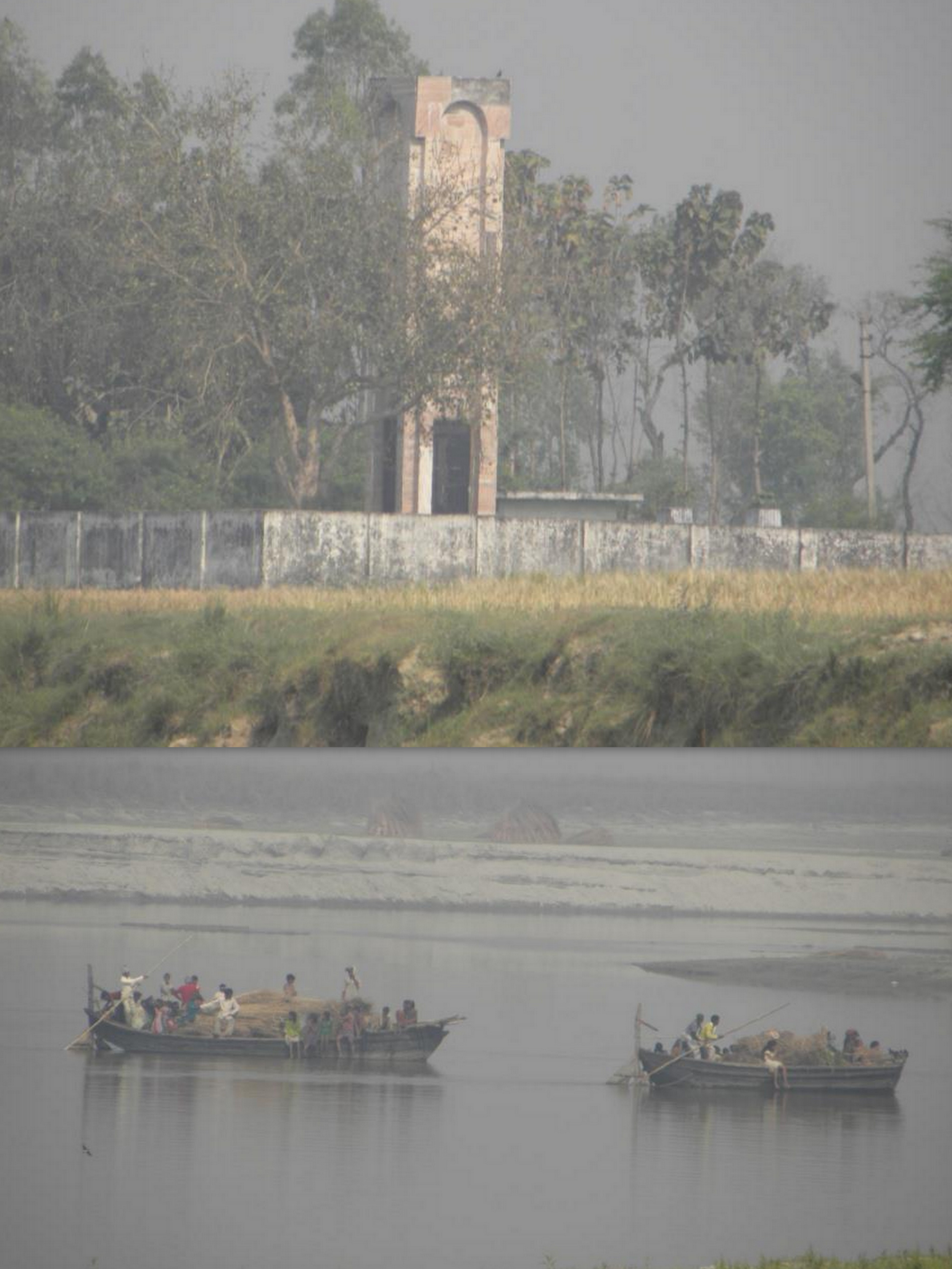
- Shaheed Smarak and Sarayu river

- Location in Uttar Pradesh, India
- Coordinates: 26°15′05″N 83°46′52″E
- Country: India
- State: Uttar Pradesh
- Division: Gorakhpur
- District: Deoria
- Tehsil: Barhaj
- Block: Barhaj

Government
  - Type: Nyaya panchayat
  - Body: Gram panchayat
  - Bansgaon (Lok Sabha constituency): Kamlesh Paswan (BJP)
  - Barhaj (Seat of State Legislative Assembly): Deepak Mishra "Shaka" (BJP)

Area
  - Rural: 2,100 km^{2} (810 sq mi)

Population (2011)
  - Total: 10,499

Languages
  - Official: Hindi
  - Regional: Bhojpuri
- Time zone: UTC+5:30 (IST)
- PIN: 274604
- Telephone code: +91-5561
- Vehicle registration: UP 52
- Sex ratio: 0.93
- Avg. annual temperature: 33 °C (91 °F)
- Avg. summer temperature: 38 °C (100 °F)
- Avg. winter temperature: 25 °C (77 °F)

Paina is a village and Nyaya Panchayat situated along the bank of Sarayu (Ghaghra) river in the eastern part of the state of Uttar Pradesh in India. It comes under administration of Barhaj Tehsil of Deoria District and Gorakhpur Division. It is located 33 km towards South from District headquarters Deoria and 340 km from State capital Lucknow.

Deubari (4 km), Telia Afgan (4 km), Nadua (4 km), Akuba (5 km), Gopalapar (5 km) are the nearby Villages to Paina. Paina is surrounded by Bhagalpur Block towards South, Salempur Tehsil towards East, Bhaluani Block towards North, Fatehpur Madaun Tehsil towards South. Barhaj, Lar, Rudrapur, Deoria, Adari are the nearby Cities to Paina.

Satraon and Sisai Gulabrai Railway Stations of North Eastern Railway Zone are the very nearby railway stations to Paina.

It is located at the border of the Deoria District, Ballia District and Mau District.

== History ==
=== Formation ===
According to the history, the village was developed by Kunwar Krit Shahi and the land was provided by landlord of Majhauli Raj.

=== Role in Freedom Movement of 1857 ===
A Shaheed Smarak was constructed by Government of Uttar Pradesh at south-western part of the village, in the memory of martyrs who took part in the India’s first war of freedom during 1857. It is situated at the bank of river Sarayu (Ghaghra) and the place locally known as "Satihara". It is a place to recall the memory of those brave unknown warriors who laid down their precious lives during the freedom struggle in 1857. It was the only village that remained independent for 2 months after 1857 war.

== Demographics ==
S. No.	Census year	Total population	Male (%)	Female (%)
1	2001	10,302	5,224 (50.70)	5078 (49.30)
2	2011	10,499	5,059 (48.19)	5,440 (51.81)

Schedule Caste (SC) constitutes 11.40% of the total population, and Scheduled Tribes is 0.017% of the total population.

=== Literacy ===
According to the 2011 census, the village has 58.56% literacy, in which male literacy stands at 54.70% and female literacy stands at 45.30%.

== Climate ==
The village has a Monsoon-influenced Humid subtropical climate. According to Köppen climate classification, it comes under Cwa category.

Paina

Climate chart (precipitation, max. and min. temperature)
J	F	M	A	M	J	J	A	S	O	N	D
7 23 8	14 27 11	7 34 16	3 41 24	6 43 28	148 41 29	355 35 27	270 34 26	198 33 24	75 32 20	2 29 15	1 25 10
- █ Average max. and min. temperatures in °C
- █ Precipitation totals in mm
Imperial conversion
J	F	M	A	M	J	J	A	S	O	N	D
0.3 73 46	0.6 81 52	0.3 93 61	0.1 106 75	0.2 109 82	5.8 106 84	14 95 81	11 93 79	7.8 91 75	3 90 68	0.1 84 59	0 77 50
- █ Average max. and min. temperatures in °F
- █ Precipitation totals in inches

== Education ==
- Shri Raghunath Singh Inter College
- 1857 Shaheed Smarak High School
- Adharsh Uchchtar Madhymik Vidyalaya (East)
- Adharsh Uchchtar Madhymik Kanya Vidyalaya (Central)
- Adharsh Prathamik Vidyalaya (East, Central, West)
- Saraswati Shishu Mandir
