= Salempur Assembly constituency =

Assembly constituency in Uttar Pradesh

Coordinates: 26.30°N 83.92°E

Salempur
- Constituency No. 341 for the Uttar Pradesh Legislative Assembly

Constituency details
- Country: India
- Region: North India
- State: Uttar Pradesh
- District: Deoria
- Total electors: 3,44,224
- Reservation: SC

Member of Legislative Assembly
- 18th Uttar Pradesh Legislative Assembly
- Incumbent Vijay Laxmi Gautam
- Party: Bharatiya Janta Party
- Elected year: 2022

Salempur is a constituency of the Uttar Pradesh Legislative Assembly covering the city of Salempur in the Deoria district of Uttar Pradesh, India. Salempur is one of five assembly constituencies in the Salempur Lok Sabha constituency.

== Members of the Legislative Assembly ==
Election	Name	Party
1967	Awadhesh Pratap Mall	Indian National Congress
1969	Shiv Bacchan	Indian National Congress
1974	Hari Kewal Prasad	Socialist Party
1977	Hari Kewal Prasad	Janata Party
1980	Durga Prasad Mishra	Bharatiya Janata Party
1985	Awadhesh Pratap Mall	Indian National Congress
1989	Suresh Yadav	Janata Dal
1991	Swami Nath Yadav	Janata Dal
1993	Anand Yadav	Bahujan Samaj Party
1996	Murad Lari	Bahujan Samaj Party
2002	Fasiha Murad Lari	Bahujan Samaj Party
2007	Ghazala Lari	Samajwadi Party
2012	Manbodh Prasad	Samajwadi Party
2017	Kalicharan Prasad	Bharatiya Janata Party
2022	Vijay Laxmi Gautam	Bharatiya Janata Party

== Results ==
=== 2027 ===
2027 Uttar Pradesh Legislative Assembly election: Salempur
Party	Candidate	Votes	%	±%
INDIA				
NDA				
BSP				
NOTA	None of the above			
Majority				
Turnout				
gain from		Swing		

=== 2022 ===
2022 Uttar Pradesh Legislative Assembly Election: Salempur
Party	Candidate	Votes	%	±%
BJP	Vijaylaxmi Gautam	82,047	46.15	−0.75
SBSP	Manbodh Prasad	65439	36.8	
BSP	Rajesh Bharati	20657	11.62	−5.71
INC	Dulari Devi	2736	1.54	
AIMIM	Bharat Vyash Gautam	2732	1.54	
NOTA	None of the Above	1823	1.03	−0.19
Majority		16608	9.35	−6.45
Turnout		177800	51.65	−0.9

=== 2017 ===
2017 Uttar Pradesh Legislative Assembly Election: Salempur
Party	Candidate	Votes	%	±%
BJP	Kali Prasad	76,175	46.9	
SP	Vijay Laxmi Gautam	50521	31.1	
BSP	Ranvijay	28152	17.33	
CPI(M)	Satish Kumar	2280	1.4	
Independent	Ramkripal	1055	0.65	
PECP	Munnilal Paswan	812	0.5	
Jan Adhikar Party	Ramesh Chanda Sahani	661	0.41	
Communist Party of India (Marxist-Leninist)(Liberation)	Arun Kumar	441	0.27	
BMP	Chandeshwar	373	0.23	
NOTA	None of the Above	1951	1.22	
Majority		25654	15.8	
Turnout		162421	52.55	
