= Kukurghati =

- Village
- Location in Uttar Pradesh, India Kukurghati (India)
- Coordinates: 26.3946343°N 84.039702°E
- Country: India
- State: Uttar Pradesh
- District: Deoria
- Village Code: 191645
- Sarpanch: Lalbachan (लालबचन)

Government
  - Type: Local Body
  - Body: Gram Panchayat

Area
  - Total: 24.3 km^{2} (9.4 sq mi)
- Elevation / Altitude': 73 m (240 ft)

Population (2011)
  - Total: 6,402
  - Density: 263/km^{2} (682/sq mi)

Languages
  - Official: Hindi, Bhojpuri, English, Urdu
- Time zone: UTC+5:30 (IST)
- PIN: 274702
- Telephone code: 05566
- Vehicle registration: UP 52
- Sex ratio: 1000/1156 ♂/♀
- Lok Sabha constituency: Salempur
- Vidhan Sabha constituency: Bhatpar Rani
- Website: up.gov.in

Kukurghati, also known as Kukur Ghati, is a village of the Bhatpar Rani Vidhan Sabha Constituency in Deoria district in the state of Uttar Pradesh, India.

== Demographics ==
Kukur Ghati is a large village located in Bhatpar Rani of Deoria district, Uttar Pradesh with total 955 families residing. The Kukur Ghati village has a population of 6402, of which 2969 are males, while 3433 are females, as per Population Census 2011.

In Kukur Ghati, the village population of children aged 0–6 is 1093 which makes up 17.07% of total population of village. The average sex ratio of Kukur Ghati village is 1156, which is higher than the Uttar Pradesh state average of 912. The child sex ratio for Kukur Ghati according to the census is 980, higher than the Uttar Pradesh average of 902.

As per constitution of India and Panchyati Raaj Act, Kukur Ghati village is administrated by Sarpanch (Head of Village), who is the elected representative of village. Lalbachan (लालबचन) is currently elected Sarpanch of Kukurghati until 2020.

== Literacy rate ==
Kukur Ghati village has a lower literacy rate than Uttar Pradesh. In 2011, the literacy rate of Kukur Ghati village was 66.06% compared to 67.68% for Uttar Pradesh. In Kukur Ghati, male literacy stands at 80.68% while female literacy rate was 52.01%. Whereas youth literacy rate is on higher side to 97% at gender neutral.

== List of Mauja (subdivision of village) ==
- Misrouli
- Nandpur
- Kukurghati
- Vishambharpur
- Bhagwanpur

== Colleges near Kukurghati ==
- Sri Ram Janki Inter College Babu Bandhi Math Bhingari Bazar Deoria
- Madan Mohan Malviya Pg College Bhatpar Rani Deoria

== Schools near Kukurghati ==
- Vidya Vihar Public School, Bhingari Bazaar (Boys & Girls Hostel) (CBSE, English/ Hindi Medium)
- Little Flower Academy High School, Bhingari bazaar (CBSE, Boys & Girls Hostel)
- Adarsh Purwa Madhayamik vidyalay Nandpur
- Sahid Bhagat Singh Harijan primary pathsala Nandpur
- VivekaNand Residential High School (Hostel)
- Government Primary schools in all Mauja
- Government Secondary High schools in Bhingari Bazar
- Adarsh Convent School Kukurghati (CBSE, English/Hindi Medium)
