= Kuichavar =

Kuichavar is a village in Bhatpar Rani tehsil, Deoria district, Uttar Pradesh, India. It is situated in Bhatpar Rani Vidhan Sabha constituency.
