= Pyasi =

Coordinates: 26.314°N 83.950°E

Pyasi or Piasi is a village in the Salempur tehsil of the Deoria district in Eastern Uttar Pradesh. The village is situated on the right bank of the river Chhoti Gandak. Adjacent villages are Banakta Dixit, Bagusara and Barsipar (from east to west). Bhojpuri is the cultural language of the village, while Hindi is widely accepted and venerated as the national language and is used for communication, along with Bhojpuri.

According to the 2011 census, Pyasi has a population of 3435; women number 1631 and men constitute 1804 individuals. Total number of households in the village is 465. Scheduled castes make up approximately 17% and scheduled tribes constitute approximately 5% of the village population.
