= Suresh Tiwari =

Indian politician (born 1946)

Member of Legislative Assembly of Barhaj
- In office 11 March 2017 – 10 March 2022
- Preceded by: Prem Prakash Singh
- Succeeded by: Deepak Mishra

Member of Legislative Assembly of Rudrapur
- In office May 2007 – March 2012
- Preceded by: Anugrah Narayan Alias Khokha Singh
- Succeeded by: Akhilesh Pratap Singh

Personal details
- Born: 18 January 1946 (age 80) Rudrapur, United Provinces, British India (now in Uttar Pradesh, India)
- Party: Bharatiya Janata Party
- Spouse: Brij Kishori Tiwari (m. 1965)
- Children: 3
- Parent: Late Tarakant Tiwari
- Education: High School
- Occupation: MLA
- Profession: Politician, Agriculture

Suresh Tiwari is an Indian politician and a former member of 15th and 17th Legislative Assembly of Uttar Pradesh of Deoria, Uttar Pradesh of India. He represents the Barhaj constituency of Uttar Pradesh and is a member of the Bharatiya Janata Party.

== Early life and education ==
Tiwari was born 18 January 1946 in Ranihwa village in Rudrapur Tehsil of Deoria district of Uttar Pradesh to his father Tarakant Tiwari. He married Birj Kishori Tiwari in 1965, they have two sons and one daughter. One of their son's is Sanjay Tiwari. He got High School degree from Satasi Inter College Rudrapur, Deoria.

== Political career ==
Tiwari has been MLA for two terms. In first term 15th Legislative Assembly of Uttar Pradesh (2007) he was elected through Bahujan Samaj Party at Rudrapur constituency, he defeated Bhartiya Janata Party candidate Jai Prakash Nishad by a margin of 6,036 votes.

In second term since 2017, he represented the Barhaj constituency and is a member of the Bhartiya Janata Party. In 17th Legislative Assembly of Uttar Pradesh (2017) elections he defeated Samajwadi Party candidate Murli Manohar Jaiswal by a margin of 11,716 votes.

== Controversies ==
In 2017, he openly threatened the municipal chairman election, saying, "god forbid if another party Chairman comes, I will make him Shikhandi." I will not let the chairman of the municipality do any work for five years.

In April 2020, a viral video of Suresh Tiwari has surfaced in which he can be heard saying, “Keep this in mind and I am saying this openly, no one should buy vegetables from Muslims”.

Meanwhile, Samajwadi Party spokesperson Anurag Bhadauriya slammed Suresh Tiwari for his comments and said, “Even in such challenging times, BJP leaders are busy spreading hate in the society. These people should be slapped with sedition charges and put in jail”.

After that, Bharatiya Janata Party National president JP Nadda said that the party will not tolerate such statement. After Suresh Tiwari's statement went viral, party president JP Nadda asked the Uttar Pradesh BJP unit to take immediate action for such a statement. After this, UP BJP has issued a show cause notice to MLA Suresh Tiwari.

== Posts held ==
#	From	To	Position	Comments
01	May 2007	March 2012	Member, 15th Legislative Assembly of Uttar Pradesh	
02	March 2017	Incumbent	Member, 17th Legislative Assembly of Uttar Pradesh	
