= Pipra Dixit =

- village
- Location in Uttar Pradesh, India Pipra Dixit (India)
- Coordinates: 26.4069°N 83.9458°E
- Country: India
- State: Uttar Pradesh
- District: Deoria

Government
  - Body: Village panchayats

Languages
  - Official: Hindi, Bhojpuri
- Time zone: UTC+5:30 (IST)
- PIN: 274701
- Telephone code: 05566

Pipra Dixit is a medium size village in Salempur tehsil of Deoria district Uttar pradesh, India.

== Demography ==
According to the Population Census 2011, Pipra Diksit has total population 1,477 of which 801 are males while 676 are females. Average Sex Ratio of Pipra Diksit village is 844 and literacy rate of the village was 73.88%.

== Overview ==
Pipra Dixit Gram Panchayat is a Rural Local Body in Bhatni Panchayat Samiti part of Deoria Zila Parishad. There are total 1 Villages under Pipra Dixit Gram Panchayat jurisdiction. Gram Panchayat Bhatni is further divided into 11 Wards.

== Profile ==
| Name | Pipra Dixit |
| Local name | Pipra Dixit |
| Type | Village Panchayat |
| Villages | Pipra Diksit |
| Inter Panchayat | Bhatni |
| Block | Bhatni |
| District Panchayat | Deoria |
| State | Uttar Pradesh |
| LGD Code | 58912 |

== Address ==
| Address Line 1 | Pipra Dixit |
| Address Line 2 | |
| Address Line 3 | |
| Pincode | 274701 |
