= Murad Lari =

Indian politician

Member Uttar Pradesh Legislative Assembly India
- In office 1996–2001
- Constituency: Salempur, Uttar Pradesh

Personal details
- Born: Lar, India
- Died: 28 September 2001
- Party: Bahujan Samaj Party
- Spouse: Ghazala Lari
- Children: Manzer lari
- Profession: Politician

Murad Lari or Morad Lari (died 5 October 2001) was a politician from Uttar Pradesh.

== Political career ==
He served as a Member of Uttar Pradesh Legislative Assembly MLA from February 1997 to October 2001, winning the 13th Uttar Pradesh legislative assembly election in Salempur, Deoria from the Bahujan Samaj Party.

In 1987, he married Ghazala Lari, former MLA from Rampur Karkhana, Deoria.

Death

Murad Lari suffered a brain stroke and died on 5 October 2001 at Sanjay Gandhi Postgraduate Institute of Medical Sciences (SGPIMS) Lucknow. An educational institute is found after his name in Salempur constituency
