= Ghazala Lari =

Indian politician

Member of Legislative Assembly of Uttar Pradesh
- Constituency: Rampur Karkhana, Uttar Pradesh

Personal details
- Born: Lar, India
- Party: Samajwadi Party
- Profession: Politician

Ghazala Lari is an Indian woman politician belonging to Samajwadi Party. She campaigned for the election of Uttar Pradesh legislative assembly from Rampur Karkhana on the symbol of Samajwadi Party in 2022.

== Political Life ==
She was a member of the Uttar Pradesh legislative assembly winning elections held respectively, in 2007 from Salempur constituency and in 2012 from Rampur Karkhana constituency, each in Deoria district, as a Samajwadi Party candidate. Ghazala Lari had married Chowdhuri Mohammad Basheer after the death of her first husband Morad Lari who was a Bahujan Samaj Party MLA from Salempur by winning the 13th Uttar Pradesh legislative assembly election (Feb 1997 until his death in 2001). She contested the subsequent 2002 Uttar Pradesh legislative assembly election for the first time as a Bahujan Samaj Party candidate from the aforementioned Salempur seat and won by 4,000 votes.
