= Bansgaon Lok Sabha constituency =

Lok Sabha Constituency in Uttar Pradesh

Coordinates: 26.55°N 83.35°E

Bansgaon UP-67
- Lok Sabha constituency
- Interactive Map Outlining Bansgaon Lok Sabha constituency

Constituency details
- Country: India
- Region: North India
- State: Uttar Pradesh
- Assembly constituencies: Chauri-Chaura; Bansgaon; Chillupar; Rudrapur; Barhaj
- Established: 1957
- Reservation: SC

Member of Parliament
- 18th Lok Sabha
- Incumbent Kamlesh Paswan
- Party: BJP
- Alliance: NDA
- Elected year: 2024

Bansgaon Lok Sabha constituency is one of the 80 Lok Sabha (parliamentary) constituencies in Uttar Pradesh state in northern India.

== Assembly segments ==
Presently, Bansgaon Lok Sabha constituency comprises five Vidhan Sabha (legislative assembly) segments. These are:

No	Name	District	Member	Party	2024 Lead
326	Chauri-Chaura	Gorakhpur	Sarvan Nishad	BJP	BJP
327	Bansgaon (SC)	Gorakhpur	Vimlesh Paswan	BJP	INC
328	Chillupar	Gorakhpur	Rajesh Tripathi	BJP	INC
336	Rudrapur	Deoria	Jai Prakash Nishad	BJP	BJP
342	Barhaj	Deoria	Deepak Mishra	BJP	INC

== Members of Parliament ==
Year	Member	Party
1957	Mahadeo Prasad	Indian National Congress
1962	Mahadeo Prasad	Indian National Congress
1967	Mohlu Prasad	Samyukta Socialist Party
1971	Ram Surat Prasad	Indian National Congress
1977	Visharad Phirangi Prasad	Janata Party
1980	Mahabir Prasad	Indian National Congress
1984	Mahabir Prasad	Indian National Congress
1989	Mahabir Prasad	Indian National Congress
1991	Raj Narain Passi	Bharatiya Janata Party
1996	Subhawati Paswan	Samajwadi Party
1998	Raj Narain Passi	Bharatiya Janata Party
1999	Raj Narain Passi	Bharatiya Janata Party
2004	Mahabir Prasad	Indian National Congress
2009	Kamlesh Paswan	Bharatiya Janata Party
2014	Kamlesh Paswan	Bharatiya Janata Party
2019	Kamlesh Paswan	Bharatiya Janata Party
2024	Kamlesh Paswan	Bharatiya Janata Party

== Election results ==
=== 2024 ===
2024 Indian general elections: Bansgaon
Party	Candidate	Votes	%	±%
BJP	Kamlesh Paswan	428,693	45.38	▼11.03
INC	Sadal Prasad	4,25,543	45.04	N/A
BSP	Ramsamujh	64,750	6.85	▼33.72
NOTA	None of the Above	9,021	0.95	▼0.50
Majority		3,150	0.34	▼15.54
Turnout		9,44,763	51.89	▼3.49
BJP hold		Swing		

=== 2019 ===
2019 Indian general elections: Bansgaon
Party	Candidate	Votes	%	±%
BJP	Kamlesh Paswan	546,673	56.41	+8.8
BSP	Sadal Prasad	3,93,205	40.57	+14.55
PSP(L)	Surendra Prasad Bharti	8,717	0.9	−0.21
Independent	Lalchand Prasad	6,448	0.67	+0.67
NOTA	None of the Above	14,093	1.45	−0.09
Majority		1,53,468	15.88	−5.71
Turnout		9,69,783	55.38	+5.50
BJP hold		Swing	-5.71	

=== 2014 ===
2014 Indian general elections: Bansgaon
Party	Candidate	Votes	%	±%
BJP	Kamlesh Paswan	417,959	47.61	▲13.26
BSP	Sadal Prasad	2,28,443	26.02	▼0.20
SP	Gorakh Prasad Paswan	1,33,675	15.23	▼2.20
INC	Sanjai Kumar	50,675	5.77	▼6.00
ASP	Lalchand Prasad Jatav	9,769	1.11	▲1.11
NOTA	None of the above	13,495	1.54	▲1.54
Majority		1,89,516	21.59	▲13.46
Turnout		8,77,911	49.88	▲10.84
BJP hold		Swing	▲13.26	

=== 2009 ===
2009 Indian general elections: Bansgaon
Party	Candidate	Votes	%	±%
BJP	Kamlesh Paswan	223,011	34.35	
BSP	Shree Nath Ji	1,70,224	26.22	
SP	Sharada Devi	1,13,170	17.43	
INC	Mahabir Prasad	76,432	11.77	
PECP	Rama Shanker	17,792	2.74	
Majority		52,787	8.13	
Turnout		6,49,953	39.07	
BJP gain from INC		Swing		

== See also ==
- Gorakhpur district
- List of constituencies of the Lok Sabha
