= Rudrapur =

Rudrapur may refer to:

- Rudrapur, Uttarakhand, a town in Uttarakhand, India
  - Rudrapur, Uttarakhand Assembly constituency
- Rudrapur, Uttar Pradesh, a town in Uttar Pradesh
  - Rudrapur, Uttar Pradesh Assembly constituency
- Rudrapur, Nepal, a village development committee in southern Nepal
- Rudrapur, Bangladesh, a village in northern Bangladesh
