= Raja Hari Prasad Mall =

- Raja of Chillupar Estate
- Born: Narharpur Estate, British India
- Died: Narharpur Estate, British India
- Religion: Hindu
- House: Vishen

Raja Hari Prasad Mall was the ruler of Chillupar/Narharpur Estate (present day area of Barhalganj) in the Gorakhpur district before the state merged with the former British provinces as Uttar Pradesh in 1947 when India became independent from British rule.

== Early life ==
Raja Hari Prasad Mall was born into a Rajput family of the Vishen clan in the Barhalganj region of Gorakhpur district, in present-day Uttar Pradesh, India. He was associated with the Chillupar/Narharpur Estate, which was situated on the banks of the Saryu River.

== Indian Rebellion of 1857 ==
Ruined Fort of Chillupar Estate

During the Indian Rebellion of 1857, Raja Hari Prasad Mall of Chillupar Estate emerged as one of the local leaders opposing British rule in the Gorakhpur region. His fort was situated at Narharpur on the banks of the Sarju River. According to accounts of the rebellion, Raja Hari Prasad Mall held meetings at the Narharpur fort with people from Paina village and local armed groups, including lathaits, archers and swordsmen, to organize resistance against the British authorities.

The rebels decided to resist British authority and refuse the payment of revenue. When British officials at the indigo factory at Bahadurpur, near Doharighat, learned of the activities, they attempted to exert pressure on Raja Hari Prasad Mall. The situation subsequently escalated into armed conflict.

According to contemporary accounts of the events, supplies and weapons being transported by boat from the indigo factory towards Gorakhpur were seized by forces associated with Raja Hari Prasad Mall. British forces subsequently attacked Chillupar State and engaged the forces of the Raja. The British forces used artillery against the Narharpur fort, causing extensive damage to the fort and the associated military cantonment. Raja Hari Prasad Mall's forces also attacked the indigo factory, setting fire to parts of the establishment and killing British soldiers.

Raja Hari Prasad Mall was subsequently killed during the rebellion along with a large number of his soldiers. The site associated with his military cantonment at present-day Barhalganj is commemorated by a memorial to the soldiers who died during the uprising. The remains of the Narharpur fort have also been associated with the memory of Raja Hari Prasad Mall and the events of 1857.

== Legacy ==
SHAHEED RAJA HARI PRASAD MALL GOVERNMENT HOMEOPATHIC MEDICAL COLLEGE & HOSPITAL

In 2024, Yogi Adityanath, the chief minister of Uttar Pradesh, announced that the Government Homeopathic Medical College in eastern Uttar Pradesh would be renamed after Raja Hari Prasad Mall. The proposal had been made by Veer Bahadur Chand, president of the Mukti Dham Seva Samiti, Gola, who submitted a representation to the chief minister requesting that the institution be named after Mall.
