= Shuklapuri =

Village in Uttar Pradesh, India

- Interactive map of Shuklapuri
- Country: India
- State: Uttar Pradesh
- District: Gorakhpur district

Shuklapuri or Shukul Puri is a village and gram panchayat in Barhalganj, Gorakhpur district, Uttar Pradesh, India. It has a post office with pin code 273402.

== Geography ==
This village is 6 km (3.7 mi) from Barahalganj between Barahalganj and Gola Bajar on Ram Janki Marg (State Highway 72).

Post Office-Shuklapuri, Gram Panchayat-Shuklapuri

Thana-Barahalganj, Tehseel-Gola Bajar

Tappa-Haveli, Pargana-Chillupar

District-Gorakhpur, State-Uttar Pradesh

Country-India, Pincode: 273402

=== Geographical facts ===
Coordinates-26° 18′ 24″ N, 83° 26′ 58″ E

- Directly connected to every neighbour village by road because Shuklapuri has three roads and two gates.
- One temple of Kali Maa and Lord Shiva, one Deeh Baba, one Aughad baba, one temple of Shani Dev
- Four ponds in four direction and eight wells presently in village and surrounded by three gardens.

== History ==
- In British Raj the King & Queen of Naraharpur State came in village after their dismissal from Naraharpur by British Army and lived here for 2 days after that they went to Nepal but before going to Nepal they hide some of their arms in Shuklapuri.
- In this village there is a 500-year-old Baniyan tree.
- There are two wells which are more than 1000 years old.
- In Shuklapuri there is a post office which is more than 100 years old and it is one of two post offices of British Raj in Gorakhpur District.

== Demography ==
There are four castes in village:

1. Brahmin (Shukla)
2. Yadav
3. Maurya (Koiri)
4. Kamhar
