= Visharad Phirangi Prasad =

Indian politician

Member of Parliament, Lok Sabha
- In office 1977–1980
- Preceded by: Ram Surat Prasad
- Succeeded by: Mahabir Prasad
- Constituency: Bansgaon

Personal details
- Born: 1 February 1940 Bishampura Village, Gorakhpur District
- Party: Janata Party
- Other political affiliations: Bharatiya Lok Dal; Bhartiya Kranti Dal; Indian National Congress
- Education: M.A, LL.B., B.Ed.
- Alma mater: Gorakhpur University; Lucknow University

Visharad Phirangi Prasad is an Indian politician. He was the member of 6th Lok Sabha as member Bansgaon. He was detained under D.I.R. and M.I.S.A. in 1975 during Emergency. He was elected as Member Uttar Pradesh Legislative Assembly for two terms 1969 and 1974.
