= Reoli =

Coordinates: 29°01′N 77°04′E

- village
- Interactive map of Reoli
- Country: India
- State: Uttar Pradesh
- District: Deoria

Languages
  - Official: Hindi, bhojpuri
- Time zone: UTC+5:30 (IST)
- PIN: 274602
- Vehicle registration: 52
- Sex ratio: 1:1 ♂/♀

Reoli is a village of block Bhagalpur in Deoria district in the state of Uttar Pradesh, India. It comes under Tehsil Salempur. It is situated 5 kilometres east to Bhagalpur. Pindi Bazar is 5 km east to it. Lar Bazar is nearly 6.5 km in northeast. Barhaj Bazar is 25 km in northwest. Deoria is 53 km from Reoli. SalemPur is just 24 km from Reoli. Belthra Road is just 10 km away in south from Reoli. Saryu (Ghaghra) river flows parallel to Bhagalpur, west to Reoli. On the other side of river there is another district named Balia.
