= Sadal Prasad =

Indian politician

Minister of State for Technical Education, Government of Uttar Pradesh
- In office 2007–2012

Member of Uttar Pradesh Legislative Assembly
- In office 2002–2012
- Preceded by: Sant Prasad
- Succeeded by: Vijay Kumar
- Constituency: Bansgaon (SC)

Personal details
- Party: Indian National Congress
- Education: Gorakhpur University (MA)

Sadal Prasad is an Indian National Congress politician, a former minister in the Uttar Pradesh Government serving from 2007 to 2012 and a member of the Uttar Pradesh Legislative Assembly from 2002 to 2012, elected twice in the 2002 and the 2007 election from Bansgaon (SC) assembly consistency. Originally a member of the Bahujan Samaj Party since a long time, he switched to the Congress party for the 2024 general election and is the Congress party candidate from Bansgaon (SC) parliamentary constituency. He has previously been the BSP candidate from the same seat in 2014 and 2019, closing the gap in the margin each time he has contested.
