= Sohnag, Salempur =

Small village in Deoria district, India

Coordinates: 26°25′N 83°12′E

Sohnag is a small village located in Deoria district in the Indian state of Uttar Pradesh, located 4 kilometres (2.5 mi) from Salempur, the tehsil headquarters.

== History and folklore ==
Sohnag is associated with events of some mythological and historical importance. In the Hindu epic Ramayana, Lord Parasurama stopped for the night at Sohnag on his way back from Janakpuri, after Lord Sri Ram broke the bow of Lord Shiva at the Swayamvar. Impressed by its pleasant atmosphere, he spent a long time in Sohnag engaged in meditation. An old temple in Sohnag, called Parasuram Kshetra / Parasuram Dham, houses ancient idols of Parasuram, Lord Sri Ram, Janaki and Lakshman which were discovered during the excavation of a nearby pond.

It is reported that Raja Sohan, king of Nepal, once passed through Sohnag while traveling with his followers on his way to Kashi, while suffering from leprosy. Being thirsty, the king dipped his hands into the water of the nearby pond, and to his surprise, discovered that the white leprous patches on his palms began to disappear. The king remained there for quite some time until he was fully cured of his affliction.
