= Lal Khadag Bahadur Malla =

Bhojpuri Author

- Born: Majhauli Raj, Oudh State, British India
- Baptised: 1853
- Occupations: Playwright; poet; author
- Era: British Raj

Khadag Bahadur Malla (1853–1896) Pen name, Lal was a Bhojpuri writer, poet, author and journalist and he could not become the Raja of Majhauli Raj of Deoria (Uttar Pradesh) in the United Provinces of Agra and Oudh because he died before the death of his father Maharaja Udai Narain Mall. He has written Maharasa play which is the dramatic version of Bhagavata Purana. His another notable work is Sudhabund, which is the collection of 60 Kajari songs and was published in 1884.

== Life ==
He was born in the ancient Vishwasen Dynasty in Majhauli Raj of Deoria in 1853. He was the king of Majhauli Raj and he wrote many Bhojpuri poems in his life time. He died in 1910.

== Works ==
- Bharat Aarat
- Sudhabund
- Maharasa
- Bharat Lalna
- Kalpvrikshya
- Lal Bhaye Diwana Bakat Aan ke Aan
