= Nitish Rajput =

Indian YouTuber

- Born: 4 October 1989 (age 36); Sultanpur, Uttar Pradesh, India
- Occupation: Content creator • author

Instagram information
- Page: Nitish Rajput
- Years active: 2021
- Followers: 3.6 M

YouTube information
- Channel: Nitish Rajput
- Genres: Education; Social; Political; History
- Subscribers: 8.56 M
- Views: 1.14 billion

Nitish Rajput (born 4 October 1989) is an Indian content creator and author. He is known for producing YouTube videos concerning politics, education, motivation, women's empowerment and history.

== Early life and career ==
Nitish Rajput was born on October 4, 1989, in Sultanpur, Uttar Pradesh. He completed his schooling from Rudrapur. He received his Engineering (IT) degree from Gautam Buddha University, Uttar Pradesh.

Rajput started his career in 2013 at an IT company where he worked many years. He created his own YouTube channel in 2020. He gained 3.5 million subscribers on his channel in a relatively short amount of time.

His videos on the Indian education system, Aryan Khan case, the Odisha train catastrophe, the Amritpal Singh case, and the Jacqueline Fernandez case in particular, have received over 50 million views.

== Controversy ==
=== SSC Examination ===
In February 2026, Eduquity Technologies Pvt. Ltd. which conducts SSC examinations, filed a ₹25 million defamation suit in a Delhi High Court against Nitish Rajput. The company claimed that Rajput's video contained misleading information that damaged its professional reputation and business interests.

The controversy began after Nitish Rajput uploaded a detailed video questioning the examination process and the appointment of vendors. According to reports, Nitish Rajput cited information obtained through RTI replies and publicly available documents in his video.

=== Pakistan Government Ban ===
In May 2025, Nitish Rajput's YouTube channel was blocked in Pakistan by Government of Pakistan during the 2025 India–Pakistan conflict..

== Bibliography ==
- Rajput, Nitish (2022). The Broken Pillars Of Democracy. Invincible Publishers. ISBN 9390767334.
