= Akhilesh Singh =

Akhilesh Singh may refer to:

- Akhilesh Kumar Singh (1959–2019), Indian politician, Uttar Pradesh Legislative Assembly member from 1993 to 2017
- Akhilesh Prasad Singh (born 1962), Indian politician, member of the Lok Sabha from 2004 to 2009, member of the Rajya Sabha since 2018
- Akhilesh Pratap Singh, Indian politician, Uttar Pradesh Legislative Assembly member from 2012 to 2017
