= Molhu Prasad =

Indian politician (born 1931)

Member of Parliament, Lok Sabha
- In office 1957-1967
- Preceded by: Mahadeo Prasad
- Succeeded by: Ram Surat Prasad
- Constituency: Bansgaon, Uttar Pradesh

Personal details
- Born: 1931; Rampura, Gorakhpur District, United Provinces, British India(present-day Uttar Pradesh, India)
- Political party: Samyukta Socialist Party
- Spouse: Teerathraji
- Children: 2 sons

Molhu Prasad (born 1931) is an Indian politician. He was elected to the Lok Sabha, the lower house of the Parliament of India from the Bansgaon constituency of Uttar Pradesh as a member of the Samyukta Socialist Party.
