= Kalicharan Prasad =

Indian politician

Kali Prasad

MLA, 17th Legislative Assembly
- In office March 2017 – March 2022
- Preceded by: Manbodh
- Constituency: Salempur, Deoria

Personal details
- Born: 6 May 1967 (age 59) Devkali, Deoria, Uttar Pradesh
- Party: Bharatiya Janata Party
- Spouse: Swarnalata Devi (m. 1979)
- Children: 2 sons, 2 daughters
- Parent: Late. Rajman
- Education: Graduate
- Occupation: MLA
- Profession: Politician

Kali Prasad (known as Kalicharan Prasad) is an Indian politician and a member of 17th Legislative Assembly of Deoria, Uttar Pradesh of India. He represents the Salempur constituency of Uttar Pradesh and is a member of the Bhartiya Janata Party.

== Early life and education ==
Prasad was born 6 May 1967 in Devkali, Deoria, Uttar Pradesh to his father Rajman. He married Swarnalata Devi in 1979, they have two sons and two daughters. He belongs to Chamar (Schedule Caste) family. In 1990, he got Graduation degree from Sampurnanand Sanskrit University, Varanasi.

== Political career ==
Peasad has been MLA for one term. Since 2017, he represents Salempur constituency as a member of Bhartiya Janata Party. He defeated Samajwadi Party candidate Vijay Laxmi Gautam by a margin of 25,654 votes.

== Posts held ==
#	From	To	Position	Comments
01	March 2017	March 2022	Member, 17th Legislative Assembly of Uttar Pradesh	
