= Deepak Kumar Mishra =

Member of Uttar Pradesh Legislative Assembly

Member of the Uttar Pradesh Legislative Assembly
- Incumbent
- Assumed office March 2022
- Preceded by: Dhananjay Kannoujia
- Constituency: Barhaj

Personal details
- Born: 27 March 1970 (age 56) Deoria, Uttar Pradesh
- Party: Bharatiya Janata Party
- Spouse: Madhuri Mishra
- Children: 2
- Parent: Durga Prasad Mishra (father)
- Occupation: Politician, Farmer

Deepak Kumar Mishra is an Indian politician, farmer, and a member of the 18th Uttar Pradesh Assembly from the Barhaj Assembly constituency of Deoria district. He is a member of the Bharatiya Janata Party.

== Early life ==
Deepak Kumar Mishra was born on 27 March 1970 in Deoria, Uttar Pradesh, to a Hindu Brahmin family of Durga Prasad Mishra. He married Madhuri Mishra and has two children.

== Posts held ==
#	From	To	Position	Comments
01	2022	Incumbent	Member, 18th Uttar Pradesh Assembly	

== See also ==
- Bharatiya Janata Party
- 18th Uttar Pradesh Assembly
- Barhaj Assembly constituency
