= Moti BA =

Indian poet, lyricist and writer (1919–2009)

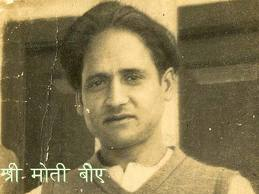
- Born: Motilal Upadhyay; 1 August 1919; Bareji, United Provinces of Agra and Oudh, British India
- Died: 18 January 2009 (aged 89)
- Education: Benaras Hindu University (Bachelor of Arts)
- Occupations: Poet; essayist; literary critic
- Parent(s): Radha Krishnan Upadhyay (father); Kaushalya Devi (mother)
- Writing career
- Notable awards: Bhasha Sanman Award in 2001 in Bhojpuri

Moti BA or Motilal Upadhyay (1 August 1919 – 18 January 2009) was a Bhojpuri poet, writer and lyricist. He has written many Bhojpuri poems, novels and lyrics of Bhojiwood and Bollywood films. For his works in Bhojpuri he received Bhasha Samman Award in 2001. He has written many songs and translated many English works in Bhojpuri.

== Life ==
Moti BA was born in Bereji village near Deoria district of Uttar Pradesh in India. He completed his school education from King George high school in 1934. He completed his bachelor in Arts from Benaras Hindu University in 1938.

=== Career ===
From 1939 to 1943 he worked in Editorial department of newspapers like Aaj, Agragami and Sansar aur Aryavart. He became famous as lyricist and musician between 1944 and 1952, he worked for Motiji Pancholi Art Pictures and Filmistan. In 1952 he started working as lecturer at Shri Krishna Inter College in Deoria. He wrote many famous songs as a lyricist, specially his song in the movie Nadiya ke paar. In 1952 he became the professor of Shree Krishna Inter college, Barhaj in Deoria district. He also received the Bhasha Sanman Award in 2001 in Bhojpuri.

== Bibliography ==
=== Bhojpuri ===
- Semar ke Phul
- Tulsi Rasayan
- Moti Ke Muktak
- Mahuabari
- Ban Ban Bole Koyalia
- Kavi Manav Sadhna

=== Translations in Bhojpuri ===
- Abraham Lincoln (from English, written by John Drinkwater)

== Filmography as a lyricist ==
Year	Film	Songs written	Music Director	Notes
1945	Kaise Kahoon	At least 5	Pandit Amarnath	
1946	Subhadra	At least 3	Vasant Desai	
1947	Amar Asha	At least 2	Shanti Kumar	
1947	Bhakta Dhruva		Shankar Rao Vyas	
1947	Ek Kadam	2	Prakash Nath Sharma	
1947	Farz	1	K. S. Sagar	
1947	Sajan	3	Ramchandra Narhar Chitalkar	
1947	Sindoor	At least 1	Khemchand Prakash	
1948	Choubeji alias Hip Hip Hurray	At least 4	Hanuman Prasad	
1948	Nadiya Ke Paar	8 (All)	Ramchandra Narhar Chitalkar	
1948	Rambaan	1	Shankar Rao Vyas	
1949	Ram Vivah	8	Shankar Rao Vyas	
1949	Rimjhim	1	Khemchand Prakash	
1949	Veer Ghatotkach alias Surekha Haran	3	Shri Nath Tripathi	
1950	Kisiki Yad	2	Hansraj Behl	
1951	Rajput	1	Husnlal-Bhagatram	
1952	Kafila	1	Husnlal-Bhagatram	
1952	Mamta	1	Manohar Lal Sonik	
1952	Nirmal	8 (All)	Bulo C. Rani	
1953	Ladki	1	R. Sundarsanam and Dhaniram	
