= Subhawati Paswan =

Indian politician (born 1952)

Member of the 11th Lok Sabha
- In office 1996–1998
- Constituency: Bansgaon

Personal details
- Born: 15 May 1952 (age 73) Jindapur Village, Gorakhpur district, Uttar Pradesh, India
- Party: Bharatiya Janata Party (since 2012); Samajwadi Party (before 2012)
- Spouse: Om Prakash Paswan (m. 1970)
- Children: 2, including Kamlesh Paswan

Subhawati Paswan (also known as Subhawati Devi) is a former member of the 11th Lok Sabha, the lower house of Indian parliament, representing Bansgaon.

== Early life ==
Subhawati was born on 15 May 1952 in Jindapur Village of Gorakhpur district, Uttar Pradesh.

== Career ==
The Bansgaon seat is reserved for Scheduled Caste category. As a Samajwadi Party candidate, Subhawati obtained 2,03,591 votes against Bharatiya Janata Party (BJP)'s Raj Narain Passi in the 1996 Indian general election. She won the seat by a margin of 4.96% votes. However, in the general elections held in 1998 and 1999, she secured 31.67% and 29.23% votes respectively; losing to Passi. She received 1,35,499 votes in the 2004 election and slipped to the third position. The following elections were won by her son Kamlesh Paswan.

Paswan switched to the BJP and contested the 2012 Uttar Pradesh legislative assembly election from Bansgaon assembly constituency. BJP leader Yogi Adityanath supported another candidate for the same seat. She finished third and received only 24,576 votes.

== Personal life ==
Subhawati married Om Prakash Paswan on 10 April 1970. They have two sons.
