= Ravindra Kushawaha =

Indian politician

Member of Parliament, Lok Sabha
- In office 16 May 2014 – 21 June 2024
- Prime Minister: Narendra Modi
- Preceded by: Ramashankar Rajbhar
- Constituency: Salempur

Personal details
- Born: 1 December 1962 (age 63) Mahthapar, Uttar Pradesh, India
- Party: Bharatiya Janata Party
- Spouse: Bindu Devi (m. 1985)
- Parent(s): Hari Kewal Prasad; Ganesh Devi
- Profession: Politician

Ravindra Kushawaha is an Indian politician and former Member of Parliament who represented Salempur Lok Sabha constituency in 16th and 17th lok sabha. He lost to Samajwadi Party Candidate Ramashankar Rajbhar in 2024 general elections.

== Life ==
Ravindra Kushwaha was born to Hari Kewal Prasad and Ganesh Devi on 1 December 1962 in a locality called Mahthapar located in Deoria district of Uttar Pradesh. He was educated till Intermediate. He completed his intermediate education from Gautam Inter College, Pipra. Subsequently, he got involved in social service. On 26 May 1985, he married Bindu Devi. They had a son and a daughter together. Due to his roots from a political family of Uttar Pradesh, he received his first opportunity to contest in Lok Sabha elections in the year 2014. In May 2014, he was elected to Indian Parliament, Lok Sabha (lower house) on the symbol of Bharatiya Janata Party. During his first term as a Member of Parliament he also served as member of Standing Committee on Food, Consumer Affairs and Public Distribution as well as a member of Consultative Committee of Ministry of Railways. On 28 July 2016 he was elected as a Member of Committee on the Welfare of Other Backward Classes.
