= Tilouli =

- village
- Interactive map of Tilouli
- Country: India
- State: Uttar Pradesh

Government
  - Body: Gram panchayat

Languages
  - Official: Hindi and Bhojpuri
- Time zone: UTC+5:30 (IST)

Tilouli is a village in Deoria district of Uttar Pradesh, India.
