= Bishunpura Lar Road Deoria =

Bishunpura,Lar Road विशुनपुरा
- Village
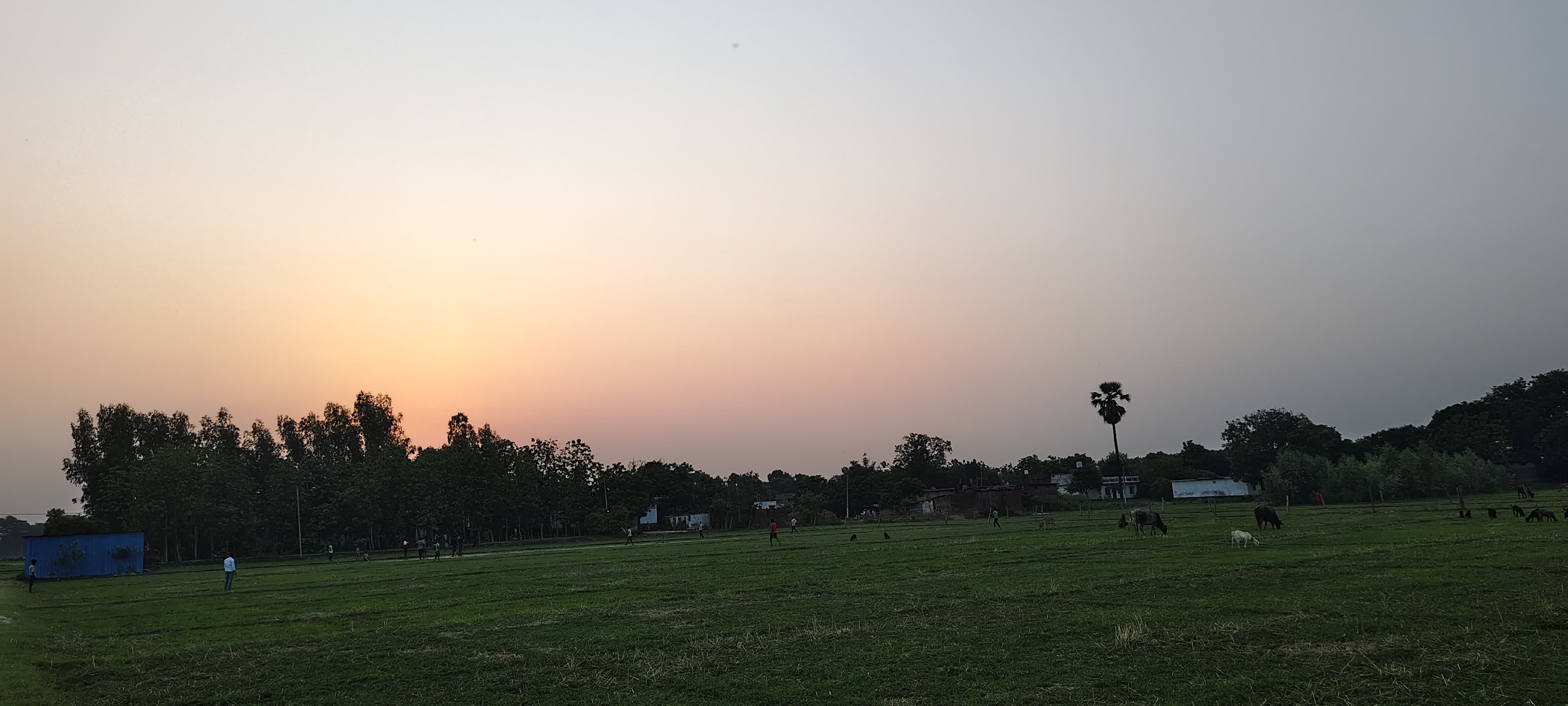
- Bishunpura village area near Lar Road (June 2026)
- Nickname: Vishunpura
- Location in Uttar Pradesh, India
- Coordinates: 26.1847°N 83.9166°E
- Country: India
- State: Uttar Pradesh
- District: Deoria
- Tehsil: Salempur
- Block: Bhagalpur

Government
  - Type: Gram panchayat
  - Body: Kurawal Tara

Area
  - Total: 0.5 km^{2} (0.19 sq mi)

Population (2011)
  - Total: 623
  - Density: 1,793/km^{2} (4,640/sq mi)
- Time zone: UTC+5:30 (IST)
- Postal code: 274505
- Vehicle registration: UP-52

Bishunpura (also known as Vishunpura) is a small village located in the Bhagalpur Development Block of Salempur Tehsil within the Deoria district of Uttar Pradesh, India. Kundaval Tara Gram Panchayat comprises five villages: Bhithaha, Bishunpura, Budhanpura, Kurawal Tara and Pachrukhia.

== Demographics ==
According to the 2011 Census of India, Bishunpura had a population of 623 people living in 92 households. No Scheduled Caste (SC) population was recorded in the village, while one resident belonged to a Scheduled Tribe (ST).

== Administration ==
Bishunpura is administered under Kundaval Tara Gram Panchayat in Bhagalpur Block of Salempur Tehsil, Deoria district, Uttar Pradesh. Kundaval Tara Gram Panchayat comprises five villages: Bhithaha, Bishunpura, Budhanpura, Kurawal Tara and Pachrukhia.

== Geography ==
Bishunpura is situated in the eastern region of Uttar Pradesh within the Gorakhpur Division, positioned at coordinates 26.1847° N, 83.9166° E. The village spans a small geographical footprint of approximately 0.5 square kilometres.

The village shares local boundaries with several neighbouring settlements:

- North: Kundawal Hari
- North-east: Kundawal Tara
- East: Badhanpura
- South-east: Tilauli
- South: Bhevli
- South-west: Rangauli

=== Connectivity ===
The village is served primarily by the Lar Road Railway Station, located approximately 2.8 kilometres away via local roads. The nearest major commercial aviation facility is Gorakhpur Airport, situated roughly 63.27 kilometres to the northwest.

== Demographics ==
According to official demographic tracking data, Bishunpura has a total population of 644 residents across approximately 92 households. The gender distribution consists of 286 males (44.4%) and 358 females (55.6%), reflecting a population density of 946 persons per square kilometre.

The principal languages spoken by the local populace are Hindi and Bhojpuri. While official national census tables only track broad scheduled demographic classifications, local demographic registers note that the resident community includes families from the Yadav, Brahmin, Kumhar, and Gaur communities.

== Culture and economy ==
The local economy is predominantly driven by subsistence and commercial agriculture. The village maintains local oral histories and communal traditions, with cultural events centered around agrarian cycles and regional festivals. Spiritual landmarks in the immediate vicinity include the Shri Krishna Pranami Mandir.
