= Hatpokhar =

- village
- Location in Uttar Pradesh, India Hatpokhar (India)
- Coordinates: 26°14′46.73″N 84°2′31.32″E
- Country: India
- State: Uttar Pradesh
- District: Deoria

Population (2001)
  - Total: 157

Languages
  - Official: Hindi
- Time zone: UTC+5:30 (IST)

Hatpokhar is a village in Deoria district in the state of Uttar Pradesh, India.

== Demographics ==
As of 2001 India census Hatpokhar had a population of 157. Males constitute 55% of the population and females 45%. This village falls under Dharaniya Gram Panchayat.
