= Ravish Tiwari =

Indian journalist (1981-2022)

- Born: 2 September 1981; Imilia, Deoria District, Uttar Pradesh, India
- Died: 19 February 2022 (aged 40); New Delhi, India
- Education: IIT Bombay, University of Oxford
- Occupation: Political journalist

Ravish Kumar Tiwari (2 September 1981, Emilia - 19 February 2022, New Delhi) was an Indian journalist who was associated with The Indian Express, India Today, and The Economic Times. At the time of his death, he was working as chief of the national bureau at The Indian Express.

== Early life and education ==
Tiwari was born in the Imilia village in Deoria District, Uttar Pradesh, India on 2 September 1981. He attended Khalilabad in the Basti District (now the Sant Kabir Nagar District) for primary school. After Class 5, he joined the Jawahar Navodaya Vidyalaya, also in Basti, and finished in 1998. He qualified for the Joint Entrance Examination in 2000 and Tiwari attended IIT Bombay for a five-year dual degree (B.Tech and M.Tech) course in Metallurgical Engineering and Materials Science. In 2005, he was selected as a Rhodes Scholar along with five other Indians, including Atishi Singh. He pursued a Master's degree at University of Oxford in Comparative Social Policy and wrote his thesis, Social Justice in Secondary Education in India: State-wise Comparison.

== Career ==
After returning from Oxford in 2006, Tiwari joined The Indian Express as the principal correspondent. He spent eight years at the publication and also filled the roles of special correspondent, assistant editor, and senior assistant editor during his tenure. His team covered Union Government issues including elections, national security, strategic affairs, diplomacy, public health, education, rural affairs, agriculture, and infrastructure. He joined India Today as associate editor in 2014, then The Economic Times as senior assistant editor in 2015. He returned to The Indian Express in June 2017 as chief of the national bureau, a role he held until his death.

== Personal life ==
Tiwari died on 19 February 2022 after a two-year battle with colon cancer. Upon his death, President Ram Nath Kovind expressed his disappointment in losing such a distinct voice in Indian media. Prime Minister Narendra Modi similarly acknowledged his "bright career in the media world."
