= Sukarauli =

Village in Deoria district, Uttar Pradesh, India

Sukarouli is a village located in Barhaj Tehsil of Deoria district in Uttar Pradesh, India. It is situated 15 km away from sub-district headquarter Barhaj and 32 km away from district headquarter Deoria. As per 2009 stats, Shkroli is the gram panchayat of Sukarouli village. According to Census 2011 information the location code or village code of Sukarouli village is 191011.

The total geographical area of village is 189.47 hectares. Sukarouli has a total population of 1,724 peoples. There are about 235 houses in Sukarouli village. Barhaj is nearest town to Sukarouli.
