= Hari Kewal Prasad =

Indian politician

Member of Parliament, 14th Lok Sabha
- In office May 2004 – May 2009
- Preceded by: Babban Rajbhar
- Succeeded by: Ramashankar Rajbhar
- Constituency: Salempur, Uttar Pradesh

Member of Parliament, 12th Lok Sabha
- In office Mar 1998 – Apr 1999
- Preceded by: Harivansh Sahai
- Succeeded by: Babban Rajbhar
- Constituency: Salempur, Uttar Pradesh

Member of Parliament, 10th Lok Sabha
- In office Jun 1991 – May 1996
- Preceded by: Hari Kewal Prasad
- Succeeded by: Harivansh Sahai
- Constituency: Salempur, Uttar Pradesh

Member of Parliament, 9th Lok Sabha
- In office Dec 1989 – Mar 1991
- Preceded by: Ram Nagina Mishra
- Succeeded by: Hari Kewal Prasad
- Constituency: Salempur, Uttar Pradesh

MLA, 7th Vidhan Sabha
- In office 1977–1980

MLA, 6th Vidhan Sabha
- In office 1974–1977

Personal details
- Born: 15 March 1940 Mahathapar, Deoria (Uttar Pradesh)
- Died: 15 September 2012 (aged 72) [PGI, Lucknow]
- Party: Samajwadi Party
- Other political affiliations: Socialist Party, Janata Dal &; Samata Party
- Spouse: Ganesha Devi (m. 1955)
- Relations: Ravindra Kushwaha
- Children: 4
- Profession: Social worker & Politician
- Committees: Member of several committees

Hari Kewal Prasad (or Harikeval Prasad) alternatively known as Hari Kewal Prasad Kushwaha was an Indian politician and Member of Parliament for four terms. He was a member of the 9th, 10th, 12th and the 14th Lok Sabhas of India. In all four terms, he represented the Salempur constituency of Uttar Pradesh and was a member of the Samajwadi Party political party before his death. His son, Ravindra Kushwaha, was also a Member of Parliament between 2014 and 2024.

== Personal life ==
Prasad was born on 15 March 1940 to Ram Lochan Prasad in Mahathapar in Deoria district of Uttar Pradesh. His highest attained education is under matriculation; he attended Junior High School in Sauhanag, Deoria. He married Ganesha Devi on 13 May 1955, with whom he had three sons and a daughter. Prasad died on 15 August 2012 at the age of 72.

== Political career ==
Hari Kewal Prasad has been in active politics since the 1950s–1960s. During his political career, he has been attached with several political parties; Socialist Party, Janata Dal, Samata Party & Samajwadi Party. During the 1970s, he was also a member of the Uttar Pradesh Legislative Assembly.

He had also held several key positions in the political parties he has been associated with. Prasad was known to be an opponent of Bharatiya Janata Party, because of his socialist leaning. Although his son, Ravindra Kushwaha argues that Prasad was close to Lal Krishna Advani and Atal Bihari Vajpayee, the BJP political workers from Deoria district of Uttar Pradesh considered him as a rival of the party. This was witnessed in 2015, when, Amit Shah was to visit Salempur to take part in the death anniversary of Prasad, organized by his son, Ravindra Kushwaha. It was reported that Prasad had considerable influence among the members of Kushwaha-Maurya and Kamboj caste in Deoria and adjoining region, whose support was required by BJP to fare well in the election. This made the BJP schedule this visit of Shah. It was also an important visit as apart from Deoria district, the district like Siwan and Gopalganj of the state of Bihar also had a considerable population of Prasad's caste men, whom Shah wanted to send a message to.

Prasad had even forced his son Ravindra Kushwaha to return to the BJP ticket, when the latter was about to contest the Assembly elections as a candidate of BJP, in the 1993 Assembly elections. In the 1991, Lok Sabha elections, BJP made Rambelash as their candidate from Salempur Lok Sabha constituency, who lost to Prasad. Prasad had contested as a candidate of Janata Dal then. In the 1998, Lok Sabha elections, the BJP candidate once again lost to Prasad, who by the time, became a member of Samata Party to contest the polls of 1998. In 1999, Prasad lost to Bahujan Samaj Party candidate; he was a member of Janata Dal (United) then. However, he won again in the 2004 Lok Sabha elections, as a candidate of Samajwadi Party.

Prasad was also involved in activism for the rights of the downtrodden section of society. He served as the President of Porters' Mazdoor Union of North Eastern Railways between 1965 and 1970. He was also associated with Hind Mazdoor Kisan Panchayat in Deoria, Uttar Pradesh between 1966 and 1967. It was an organization working for the welfare of laborers and peasantry. Later, he also became a part of Roadways Mazdoor Sabha, an organization working for the welfare of manual laborers. He remained associated with it in the 1980s. He also participated in movements launched by Samyukta Socialist Party, Socialist Party, and Janata Party. The highest point of his activism was his participation in Scheduled Castes Kashi Temple Entry Movement of 1954. He led this movement to ensure the right to worship for the Dalit people. Prasad was also a part of Angreji Hatao Andolan (Remove English Name Plates Movement) in Varanasi, Lucknow, Farukhabad, Faizabad, Gorakhpur, Fatehpur and Deoria in 1954 and 1956. He was against the ill effects of Globalisation on small businesses and championed the cause of small traders against multinational companies from 1960 onwards. During National Emergency, he was imprisoned for 21 months under Maintenance of Internal Security Act and prosecuted in 18 cases under Defence of India Rules.

== Posts held ==
#	From	To	Position
01	1974	1977	Member, Uttar Pradesh Legislative Assembly
02	1977	1980	Member, Uttar Pradesh Legislative Assembly
03	1977	1980	Member, Committee on Subordinate Legislation
04	1977	1980	Member, Committee on Railways
05	1989	1991	Member, 09th Lok Sabha
06	1990	1991	Member, Committee on Private Member's Bills and Resolutions
07	1991	1996	Member, 10th Lok Sabha
08	1991	1992	Member, Committee on Home Affairs
09	1991	1992	Member, Consultative Committee, Ministry of Railways
10	1991	1996	Member, Committee on Estimates
11	1991	1996	Member, Consultative Committee, Ministry of Industry
12	1991	1996	Member, Committee on members of parliament Local Area Development Scheme
13	1991	1996	Member, Committee on Railways
14	1998	1999	Member, 12th Lok Sabha
15	1998	1999	Member, Committee on Government Assurances
16	2004	2009	Member, 14th Lok Sabha
17	2004	2009	Member, Estimates Committee
18	2007	2009	Member, Committee on Food, Consumer Affairs & Public Distribution
19	2008	2009	Member, Committee on Public Undertakings

== See also ==
- 9th, 10th, 12th & 14th Lok Sabha
- Lok Sabha
- Politics of India
- Parliament of India
- Government of India
- Samajwadi Party
- Salempur (Lok Sabha constituency)
- Uttar Pradesh Legislative Assembly
