= Kamlesh Paswan =

Indian politician (born 1976)

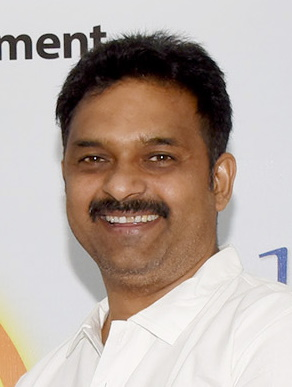
- Paswan in 2024

Minister of State for Rural Development Government of India
- Incumbent
- Assumed office 11 June 2024 serving with Chandra Sekhar Pemmasani
- President: Draupadi Murmu
- Prime Minister: Narendra Modi
- Minister: Shivraj Singh Chauhan
- Preceded by: Faggan Singh Kulaste

Member of Parliament, Lok Sabha
- Incumbent
- Assumed office 16 May 2009
- Preceded by: Mahabir Prasad
- Constituency: Bansgaon

Member of Uttar Pradesh Legislative Assembly
- In office 26 February 2002 – 13 May 2007
- Preceded by: Chandresh Paswan
- Succeeded by: Vijay Bahadur Yadav
- Constituency: Maniram

Personal details
- Born: 6 August 1976 (age 50) Gorakhpur, Uttar Pradesh, India
- Citizenship: India
- Party: Bharatiya Janata Party (Since 2009), Samajwadi Party (before 2009).
- Spouse: Ritu
- Relations: Vimlesh Paswan (Brother)
- Children: 3 Jai, Raksha and Tanu
- Parent(s): Om Prakash Paswan (Father), Subhawati Paswan (Mother)
- Education: St. Pauls School in Gorakhpur.
- Profession: Businessperson & Politician.
- Committees: Member, Committee on Social Justice and Empowerment

Kamlesh Paswan is an Indian politician and is a Member of Parliament in the 18th Lok Sabha of India and Minister of State in Ministry of Rural Development. Paswan represents the Bansgaon constituency of Uttar Pradesh and is a member of the Bharatiya Janata Party political party.

== Early life and education ==
Kamlesh Paswan was born Pasi community in Gorakhpur, Uttar Pradesh. He is a matriculate from St. Paul's School in Gorakhpur. His father, Om Prakash Paswan, was also a politician and was killed in 1996 while addressing a public meeting.

== Political career ==
Paswan was also a member of the Uttar Pradesh Legislative Assembly from Maniram (Vidhan Sabha constituency) as Samajwadi Party Candidate . In 2009, he joined Bharatiya Janta Party and contested for Lok Sabha elections and became a member of the 15th Lok Sabha from Bansgaon constituency. He is a member of 16th Lok Sabha.

=== Threat on life ===
In October 2013, Paswan claimed that his life was under threat from "political rivals and mafia" in the region. Reportedly, he had requested the District magistrate and the Superintendent of police for providing him security cover. Paswan also stated that he contemplated raising his security concerns to the Chief Minister of U.P., Akhilesh Yadav.

== Posts held ==
#	From	To	Position
01	2002	2007	Member Uttar Pradesh Legislative Assembly
02	2009	2014	Member, 15th Lok Sabha
03	2009	2014	Member, Committee on Social Justice and Empowerment
04	2014	2019	Member, 16th Lok Sabha
05	2019	2024	Member, 17th Lok Sabha
06	2024	Incumbent	Member, 18th Lok Sabha

== See also ==
- 15th Lok Sabha
- Politics of India
- Parliament of India
- Third Modi ministry
