= Khajani Assembly constituency =

Constituency of the Uttar Pradesh legislative assembly in India

Coordinates: 26.66°N 83.25°E

Khajani
- Constituency No. 325 for the Uttar Pradesh Legislative Assembly

Constituency details
- Country: India
- Region: North India
- State: Uttar Pradesh
- District: Gorakhpur
- Total electors: 3,80,081
- Reservation: SC

Member of Legislative Assembly
- 18th Uttar Pradesh Legislative Assembly
- Incumbent Sriram Chauhan
- Party: Bharatiya Janta Party
- Elected year: 2022

Khajani is a constituency of the Uttar Pradesh Legislative Assembly covering the city of Khajani in Gorakhpur district, Uttar Pradesh, India.

Khajani is one of five assembly constituencies in the Sant Kabir Nagar Lok Sabha constituency. Since 2008, this assembly constituency is numbered 325 amongst 403 constituencies.

== Members of the Legislative Assembly ==
Election	Name	Party
Till 2012 : Constituency did not exist
2012	Sant Prasad	Bharatiya Janata Party
2017	Sant Prasad	Bharatiya Janata Party
2022	Sriram Chauhan	Bharatiya Janata Party

== Election results ==
=== 2027 ===
2027 Uttar Pradesh Legislative Assembly election: Khajani
Party	Candidate	Votes	%	±%
INDIA				
NDA				
BSP				
NOTA	None of the above			
Majority				
Turnout				
gain from		Swing		

=== 2022 ===
2022 Uttar Pradesh Legislative Assembly election: Khajani
Party	Candidate	Votes	%	±%
BJP	Shriram Chauhan	90,210	45.37	▲7.3
SP	Rupawati Beldar	53,109	26.71	▲4.3
BSP	Vidyasagar	46,427	23.35	▼4.03
INC	Rajani	2,197	1.1	▼1.38
NOTA	None of the above	1,453	0.73	▼0.39
Majority		37,101	18.66	▲7.97
Turnout		198,828	52.31	▲0.79
BJP hold		Swing		

=== 2017 ===
Bharatiya Janta Party candidate Sant Prasad won in last Assembly election of 2017 Uttar Pradesh Legislative Elections defeating Bahujan Samaj Party candidate Rajkumar by a margin of 20,079 votes.

2017 Uttar Pradesh Legislative Assembly Election: Khajan
Party	Candidate	Votes	%	±%
BJP	Sant Prasad	71,492	38.07	
BSP	Rajkumar	51,413	27.38	
SP	Rupawati Beldar	42,085	22.41	
NISHAD	Vidya Sagar	11,289	6.01	
INC	Commando Kamal Kishor	4,653	2.48	
NOTA	None of the above	2,085	1.12	
Majority		20,079	10.69	
Turnout		187,798	51.52	
