= Bansgaon Assembly constituency =

Constituency of the Uttar Pradesh legislative assembly in India

Coordinates: 26.55°N 83.35°E

Bansgaon
- Constituency No. 327 for the Uttar Pradesh Legislative Assembly

Constituency details
- Country: India
- Region: North India
- State: Uttar Pradesh
- District: Gorakhpur
- Reservation: SC

Member of Legislative Assembly
- 18th Uttar Pradesh Legislative Assembly
- Incumbent Vimlesh Paswan
- Party: Bharatiya Janta Party
- Elected year: 2022
- Preceded by: Vijay Kumar

Bansgaon is a constituency of the Uttar Pradesh Legislative Assembly covering the city of Bansgaon in the Gorakhpur district of Uttar Pradesh, India.

Bansgaon is one of five assembly constituencies in the Bansgaon Lok Sabha constituency. Since 2008, this assembly constituency is numbered 327 amongst 403 constituencies.

== Members of the Legislative Assembly ==
Year	Member	Party
1957	Ganesh Prasad	Indian National Congress
1962	Ganesh Prasad	Indian National Congress
1967	Jagdish Singh	Samyukta Socialist Party
1967^	Masali Devi	Samyukta Socialist Party
1969	Masali Devi	Samyukta Socialist Party
1977	Babu Lal	Janata Party
1980	Kailash Prasad	Indian National Congress (Indira)
1985	Kailash Prasad	Indian National Congress
1989	Mithai Lal Shastri	Bharatiya Janata Party
1991	Yadhu Nath	Bharatiya Janata Party
1993	Molai	Bahujan Samaj Party
1996	Sant Prasad	Bharatiya Janata Party
2002	Sadal Prasad	Bahujan Samaj Party
2007	Sadal Prasad	Bahujan Samaj Party
2012	Vijay Kumar	Bahujan Samaj Party
2017	Vimlesh Paswan	Bharatiya Janata Party
2022	Vimlesh Paswan	Bharatiya Janata Party

== Election results ==
=== 2027 ===
2027 Uttar Pradesh Legislative Assembly election: Bansgaon
Party	Candidate	Votes	%	±%
INDIA				
NDA				
BSP				
NOTA	None of the above			
Majority				
Turnout				
gain from		Swing		

=== 2022 ===
2022 Uttar Pradesh Legislative Assembly election: Bansgaon
Party	Candidate	Votes	%	±%
BJP	Vimlesh Paswan	87,224	46.26	▲6.01
SP	Sanjay Kumar	54,915	29.13	▲4.5
BSP	Ramnayan Azad	37,204	19.73	▼7.72
INC	Poonam	2,050	1.09	
NOTA	None of the above	1,460	0.77	▼0.44
Majority		32,309	17.13	▲4.33
Turnout		188,542	49.48	▲1.25
BJP hold		Swing		

=== 2017 ===
Bharatiya Janta Party candidate Vimlesh Paswan won in last Assembly election of 2017 Uttar Pradesh Legislative Elections defeating Bahujan Samaj Party candidate Dharmendra Kumar by a margin of 22,873 votes.

2017 Uttar Pradesh Legislative Assembly election: Bansgaon
Party	Candidate	Votes	%	±%
BJP	Vimlesh Paswan	71,966	40.25	
BSP	Dharmendra Kumar	49,093	27.45	
SP	Sharada Devi	44,051	24.63	
NISHAD	Nandlal	7,892	4.41	
NOTA	None of the above	2,143	1.21	
Majority		22,873	12.8	
Turnout		178,818	48.23	
BJP gain from BSP		Swing		
