= Ramashankar Rajbhar =

Member of Parliament

Member of Parliament, Lok Sabha
- Incumbent
- Assumed office 2024
- Preceded by: Ravindra Kushwaha
- Constituency: Salempur
- In office 2009–2014
- Preceded by: Hari Kewal Prasad
- Succeeded by: Ravindra Kushwaha
- Constituency: Salempur

Personal details
- Born: 1 January 1960 (age 66) Shivpur, Uttar Pradesh, India
- Citizenship: India
- Party: Samajwadi Party
- Other political affiliations: Bahujan Samaj Party
- Spouse: Krisnawti Devi
- Education: Gorakhpur University
- Profession: Politician
- Committees: Member of one committee

Ramashankar Rajbhar is an Indian politician and is Member of Parliament of the 18th and 15th Lok Sabha of India. He represents the Salempur constituency of Uttar Pradesh and is a member of the Samajwadi Party.

== Early life and education ==
Ramashankar Rajbhar was born in Shivpur, Deoria district in the state of Uttar Pradesh. He is a graduate from the Gorakhpur University.

== Political career ==
Ramashankar Rajbhar is a first time MP. He succeeded Hari Kewal Prasad who was four times MP from the same constituency. Hari Kewal Prasad was a member of the 9th, 10th, 12th and 14th Lok Sabhas and belonged to Samajwadi Party.

== Posts held ==
#	From	To	Position
01	2009	2014	Member, 15th Lok Sabha
02	2009	2014	Member, Committee on Water Resources
03	2024	2029	Member, 18th Lok Sabha

== See also ==
- 15th Lok Sabha
- Politics of India
- Parliament of India
- Government of India
- Bahujan Samaj Party
- Salempur (Lok Sabha constituency)
