= Gaura Barhaj =

- Town
- Location in Uttar Pradesh, India
- Coordinates: 26°17′N 83°44′E
- Country: India
- State: Uttar Pradesh
- District: Deoria

Population (2011)
  - Total: 36,459
  - Density: 317/km^{2} (820/sq mi)

Language
  - Official: Hindi
  - Additional official: Urdu

Demographics
  - Sex Ratio: 980
  - Literacy: 75.37%
- Time zone: UTC+5:30 (IST)
- Vehicle registration: UP-52

Gaura Barhaj is a town and a municipal board in Deoria district in the state of Uttar Pradesh, India. It is at the banks of the holy Saryu (Ghaghra) River. Along the riverbanks, Sona mandir, the workplace of the Saint Baba Raghav Das, is located and it is a prominent place of attraction in the town. (St. Joseph's School Barhaj) is located in this city. The school is run by Kerala based Management.

== Demographics ==
As of 2011 India census, Gaura Barhaj had a population of 1,38,489. Males constitute 52% of the population and females 48%. Gaura Barhaj has an average literacy rate of 75.37%, Greater than the national average of 74.04%: male literacy is 78.5%, and female literacy is 72.24%. In Gaura Barhaj, 16% of the population is under 6 years of age.
