= Unwal =

Village in Uttar Pradesh, India

Unwal Kasba Sangrampur
- Village
- Location in Uttar Pradesh, India
- Coordinates: 26.62823°N 83.293°E
- Country: India
- State: Uttar Pradesh
- District: Gorakhpur
- Tehsil: Khajni

Area
  - Total: 10.38 km^{2} (4.01 sq mi)

Population (2011)
  - Total: 17,377
  - Density: 1,674/km^{2} (4,336/sq mi)
- Time zone: UTC+5:30 (IST)
- PIN: 273406

Unwal (Unwal), also called Sangrampur or Kasba Sangrampur (Kasbā Saṅgrāmpur) and possibly also Unaula (Unaulā), is a large village in Bansgaon block of Gorakhpur district, Uttar Pradesh. It may also be identical with the Oṇavala mentioned in two Gāhaḍavāla-era copper plate grants from the early 1100s. The pargana of Unaula may be named after Unwal. As of 2011, it has a population of 17,377, in 2,460 households.

== Name ==
The names "Unwal" and "Sangrampur" are both used interchangeably to refer to this place.

== Geography ==
Unwal is located just north of the Kauriram-Bansgaon-Rudrapur road, about 10 km northwest of Bansgaon and 23 km from Gorakhpur.

== History ==
According to Roma Niyogi, Unaula can be identified with the place called Oṇavala mentioned in two copper plate grants of the Gāhaḍavāla monarch Govindachandra, although it's unspecified if Niyogi is referring to Unwal or Unaula Khas. Both of these inscriptions were found at the nearby village of Pali. The first one is dated to 1114 (VS 1171), and the second one is dated to April 1132 (VS 1189). These two inscriptions describe Oṇavala as a pathaka and name two pattalās as part of it: Sirasī (identified with present-day Sirsi) and Goyara. Oṇavala was part of some entity called Saruvāra, which may have been a vishaya (district).

At the turn of the 20th century, Unwal was described as a "small but compact town" that had previously been administered as a municipality, but had since been downgraded because it was really just a very large agricultural village without much of a commercial presence. It was the main town in pargana Unaula, which may be named after Unwal. The main landmarks at that point were the brick palace of the Raja of Unaula (who was the local zamindar), located in the qasba, and a lower primary school. Its population as of 1872 was 2,735 and its population as of 1901 was 4,095.

== Demographics ==
As of 2011, Kasba Sangrampur had a population of 17,377, in 2,460 households. This population was 50.6% male (8,790) and 49.4% female (8,587). The 0-6 age group numbered 2,529 (1,361 male and 1,168 female), or 14.6% of the total population. 2,278 residents were members of Scheduled Castes, or 13.1% of the total.

The 1981 census recorded Kasba Sangrampur (as "Kaswa Sangrampur") as having a population of 8,932 people, in 1,475 households.

== Economy ==
Sangrampur Unwal hosts a market twice per week, on Thursdays and Sundays. It mainly deals in everyday items like grain, vegetables, and groceries. As of 1961, it had an average attendance of around 1,000.

== Infrastructure ==
As of 2011, Kasba Sangrampur had 1 primary school; it did not have any healthcare facilities. Drinking water was provided by tap and hand pump. The village had a post office but no public library; there was no access to electricity. Streets were made of both kachcha and pakka materials.
