= Unaula Khas =

Village in Uttar Pradesh, India

- Village
- Location in Uttar Pradesh, India
- Coordinates: 26.60604°N 83.22805°E
- Country: India
- State: Uttar Pradesh
- District: Gorakhpur
- Tehsil: Khajni

Area
  - Total: 0.99 km^{2} (0.38 sq mi)

Population (2011)
  - Total: 1,078
  - Density: 1,100/km^{2} (2,800/sq mi)
- Time zone: UTC+5:30 (IST)

Unaula Khas (Unaulā Khās), also just Unaula, is a village in Khajni block of Gorakhpur district, Uttar Pradesh. It may be identical with the Oṇavala mentioned in two Gāhaḍavāla-era copper plate grants from the early 1100s. As of 2011, it has a population of 1,078, in 136 households.

== Name ==
The name "Unaula" is sometimes also written "Anaula".

== Geography ==
Unaula is located just west of the Gorakhpur-Sikriganj road, about 21 km southwest of Gorakhpur and about 11 km northwest of Bansgaon.

== History ==
According to Roma Niyogi, Unaula can be identified with the place called Oṇavala mentioned in two copper plate grants of the Gāhaḍavāla monarch Govindachandra, although it's unspecified if Niyogi is referring to Unaula Khas or to nearby Unwal. Both of these inscriptions were found at the nearby village of Pali. The first one is dated to 1114 (VS 1171), and the second one is dated to April 1132 (VS 1189). These two inscriptions describe Oṇavala as a pathaka and name two pattalās as part of it: Sirasī (identified with present-day Sirsi) and Goyara. Oṇavala was part of some entity called Saruvāra, which may have been a vishaya (district).

Unaula may also be the namesake of the later pargana called Unaula, but this is doubtful. It formed part of the tappa of Mohsan, while Unwal was the seat of the Haveli tappa and also the seat of the Rajas of Unaula. At the turn of the 20th century, the village of Unaula was described as "wholly insignificant", with a population of just 312 as of 1901.

== Demographics ==
As of 2011, Unala Khas had a population of 1,078, in 136 households. This population was 50.3% male (542) and 49.7% female (536). The 0-6 age group numbered 169 (87 male and 82 female), or 15.7% of the total population. 172 residents were members of Scheduled Castes, or 16.0% of the total.

The 1981 census recorded Unaula Khas as having a population of 677 people, in 94 households.

== Infrastructure ==
As of 2011, Unaula Khas had 1 community health centre; it did not have any schools. Drinking water was provided by hand pump and tube well/borehole. The village did not have a post office or public library; there was at least some access to electricity for all purposes. Streets were made of kachcha materials.
