= Akhilesh Pratap Singh =

Indian politician

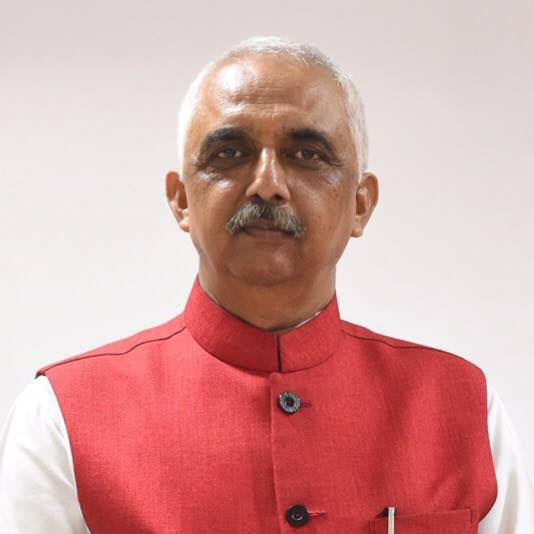

MLA, 16th Legislative Assembly
- In office 8 March 2012 – 11 March 2017
- Preceded by: Suresh Tiwari
- Succeeded by: Jai Prakash Nishad
- Constituency: Rudrapur

Personal details
- Born: 21 May 1960 (age 66) Deoria, Uttar Pradesh, India
- Party: Indian National Congress
- Spouse: Vibha Singh
- Children: 1 son & 1 daughter
- Parent: Fateh Bahadur Singh (father)
- Education: University of Allahabad
- Profession: Politician & farmer

Akhilesh Pratap Singh (born 21 May 1960) is an Indian politician and a member of the 16th Legislative Assembly of Uttar Pradesh. He represented the Rudrapur constituency of Uttar Pradesh until 2017 and is a member and spokesperson for the Indian National Congress party.

== Early life and education ==
Akhilesh Pratap Singh was born in Deoria district. He attended the University of Allahabad and attained Master of Arts degree. Captained the Allahabad University and Allahabad District Basketball Team, representing them in state and national level events.

== Political career ==
Akhilesh Pratap Singh has been a MLA for one term. He represented the Rudrapur constituency and is a member of the Indian National Congress party.

== Posts held ==
#	From	To	Position	Comments
01	1986	1995	Spokesperson, Secretary, General Secretary, Vice President, Acting President UP Youth Congress	
02	1995	2012	Spokesperson, Chief Spokesperson, Chairman media department, Uttar Pradesh Congress Committee	
03	2012	2017	Member, 16th Legislative Assembly	
04	2012	2017	Member, Ethics Committee, 16th Legislative Assembly	
05	2012	2018	National media panelist, Indian National Congress	
06	2018	present	Spokesperson, Indian National Congress	

== Personal life ==
His brother KP Singh is a colonel in the Army Air Defence.

His nephew is Indian Air Force group captain Varun Singh, who lost his life in 2021 Indian Air Force Mil Mi-17 crash.

== See also ==
- Rudrapur (Assembly constituency)
- Sixteenth Legislative Assembly of Uttar Pradesh
- Uttar Pradesh Legislative Assembly
