= Mahaveer Prasad =

Indian politician (1939–2010)

Mahabir Prasad
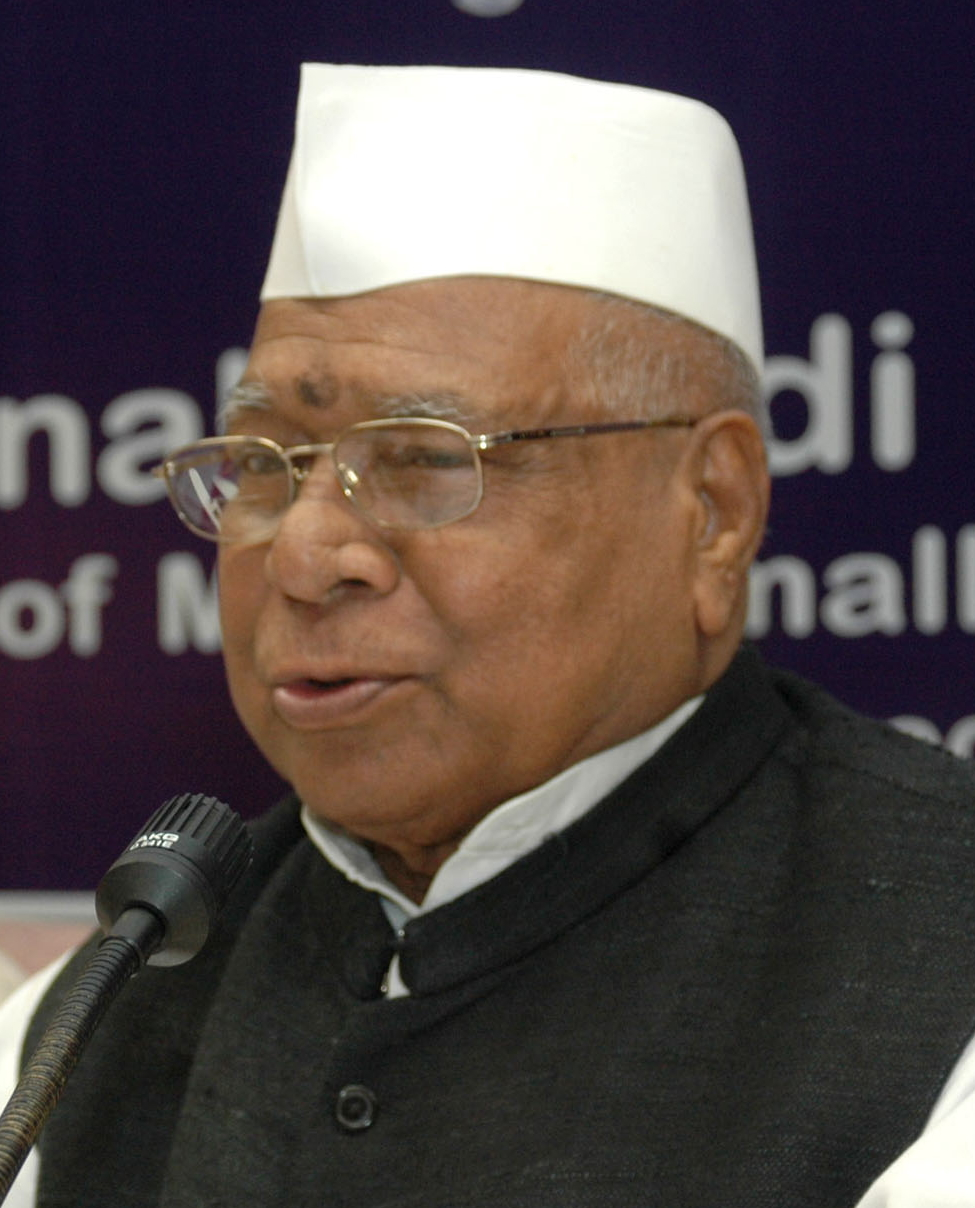
- Prasad in 2008

Union Minister of Micro, Small and Medium Enterprises
- In office 9 May 2007 – 22 May 2009
- Prime Minister: Manmohan Singh
- Preceded by: Ministry established
- Succeeded by: Dinsha Patel

Union Minister of Small Scale Industries, and Agro and Rural Industries
- In office 23 May 2004 – 9 May 2007
- Prime Minister: Manmohan Singh
- Preceded by: C. P. Thakur (Small Scale Industries); Sangh Priya Gautam (Agro and Rural Industries)
- Succeeded by: Ministry abolished

Governor of Haryana
- In office 14 June 1995 – 18 June 2000
- Chief Minister: Bhajan Lal; Bansi Lal; Om Prakash Chautala
- Preceded by: Dhanik Lal Mandal
- Succeeded by: Babu Parmanand

Governor of Himachal Pradesh
- Additional charge
- In office 18 September 1995 – 17 November 1995
- Chief Minister: Virbhadra Singh
- Preceded by: Sudhakarrao Naik
- Succeeded by: Sheila Kaul
- In office 23 April 1996 – 25 July 1997
- Chief Minister: Virbhadra Singh
- Preceded by: Sheila Kaul
- Succeeded by: V. S. Ramadevi

Union Minister of State for Steel and Mines (Department of Mines)
- In office 4 July 1989 – 2 December 1989
- Prime Minister: Rajiv Gandhi
- Minister: Makhan Lal Fotedar

Member of Parliament, Lok Sabha
- In office 13 May 2004 – 16 May 2009
- Preceded by: Raj Narain Passi
- Succeeded by: Kamlesh Paswan
- Constituency: Bansgaon
- In office 7 January 1980 – 16 June 1991
- Preceded by: Visharad Phirangi Prasad
- Succeeded by: Raj Narain Passi

Personal details
- Born: 11 November 1939 Gorakhpur, Uttar Pradesh, India
- Died: 29 November 2010 (aged 71) Rajender Nagar, Delhi, India
- Party: INC
- Spouse: Late Udasi Devi
- Children: 2

Mahaveer Prasad (Hindi: महावीर प्रसाद) (11 November 1939 – 28 November 2010) was an Indian politician. He stood for the 2004 Lok Sabha elections on the Indian National Congress ticket and until his death was a Member of Parliament for Bansgaon. He was the Union Cabinet Minister of Small Scale Industries and Agro and Rural Industries.

== Early life and education ==
Prasad was born on 11 November 1939 at Gore-Garh in Gorakhpur district, Uttar Pradesh into a Chamar family. He was a resident of Ujjarpar village in Gorakhpur district. According to some sources, he was a Geography Teacher in the All India Gandhi Inter College, Gorakhpur for about 34 years. He was a social worker and worked for the betterment of weaker and socially backward communities.

== Political career ==
Prasad was a member of the Uttar Pradesh Legislative Assembly from 1974 to 1977. He was elected to the 7th Lok Sabha in 1980 and to the 8th Lok Sabha in 1984. He was Union Deputy Minister of Railways from February 1988 to July 1989 and Minister of State for Mines and Steel in the Department of Mines from July 1989 to December 1989. He was elected to the 9th Lok Sabha in 1989 and served as Governor of Haryana from 14 June 1994 to 1999. While he was Governor of Haryana, he also served as Governor of Himachal Pradesh from 18 September 1995 to 16 November 1995 and again from 23 April 1996 to 26 July 1997. He was elected to the 14th Lok Sabha in 2004, and following the election he became Union Cabinet Minister of Small Scale Industries and Agro & Rural Industries on 22 May 2004.

== Personal life ==
He was oldest among his brothers, Lt. Prabhunath Prasad and Lt. Chhavilal Prasad. His nephews (brother's sons) are Vijay Kumar, Raj Kumar, Baijnath Kumar who currently live in Gorakhpur and doing well in their career.

Mahaveer Prasad died on 28 November 2010 at the Sir Ganga Ram Hospital in Delhi after a long illness.
