= Ram Naresh Kushwaha =

Indian politician

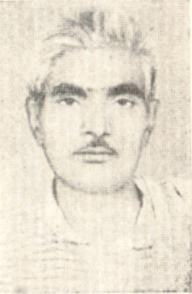

Member of Parliament India
- Constituency: Salempur, Uttar Pradesh

Personal details
- Born: 30 April 1929 Lar, India
- Died: 7 October 2013 (aged 84)
- Party: Janata Party, Lok Dal
- Profession: Politician

Ram Naresh Kushwaha (30 April 1929 – 7 October 2013) was an Indian social activist, politician, and writer of Hindi literature, who served as a Member of Parliament (1977). In Uttar Pradesh, he held organizational positions under the Socialist Party, Praja Socialist Party, Samyukta Socialist Party, and Bhartiya Lok Dal (Janata Party) during his political career (1964-1997).

== Early life ==
Ram Naresh Kushwaha was born on 30 April 1929 in Lar, district of Deoria Uttar Pradesh. Received early education at Junior High School Mathlaar, Swami Devanand Inter College, Mathlaar in Deoria District. Thereafter he privately earned Sahitya Ratna (as a B.A. degree) from I.G.D. Diploma Drawing Board, Bombay. He worked as an agriculturist and teacher.

== Political life ==
Raam Naresh Kushwaha earlier worked at the party level as General Secretary, (i)Uttar Pradesh Samyukta Socialist Party, 1967—69 and (ii) U. P. Socialist Party, 1971–72; Convener, Ganna Sangharsh Samiti of Bharatiya Lok Dal, Uttar Pradesh, 1974–76; Member, Cooperative Agriculture Advisory Committee of Uttar Pradesh Government (1966–67). He was elected for the first time in the 1977 Indian general election as a Member of Parliament from Salempur constituency, Deoria district on Janata Party symbol. In his tenure of Parliament (1977-1979), he stood for the right cause and for this his intervention was reported in debates on regional and other national issues. He served as a Member of the Committee on Absence of Members in the house of Parliament, Lok Sabha. In addition, he was elected a member of Rajya Sabha, the upper house of the Parliament, from Uttar Pradesh as a Lok Dal Party candidate holding the aforementioned office (1982-1988).

== Death ==
He died on 7 October 2013 in Lar Deoria.
