= Jai Prakash Nishad (Rudrapur) =

Indian politician

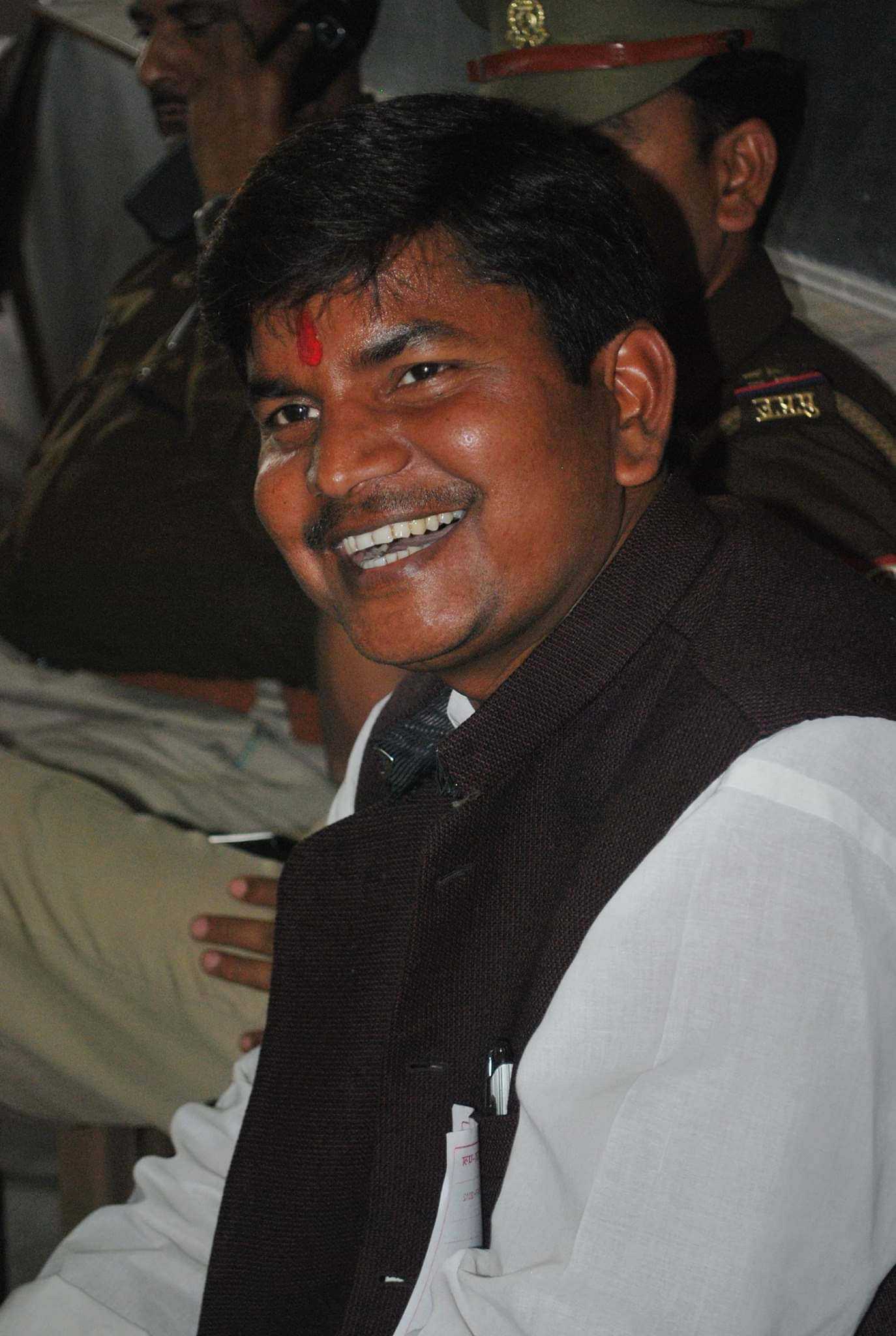
- Jayaprakash Nishad former MLA Chauri Chaura during election results

Minister of Animal Husbandry & Fisheries Government of Uttar Pradesh
- In office 19 March 2017 – 25 March 2022
- Chief Minister: Yogi Adityanath
- Minister: S. P. Singh Baghel; Chaudhary Laxmi Narayan Singh

Member of Uttar Pradesh Legislative Assembly
- Incumbent
- Assumed office 2017
- Preceded by: Akhilesh Pratap Singh
- Constituency: Rudrapur
- In office 1996–2002
- Preceded by: Mukti Nath Yadav
- Succeeded by: Anugrah Narain Alias Khokha Singh
- Constituency: Rudrapur
- In office 1991–1992
- Preceded by: Mukti Nath Yadav
- Succeeded by: Mukti Nath Yadav
- Constituency: Rudrapur

Personal details
- Born: 1 October 1960 (age 65) Rudrapur, Deoria, Uttar Pradesh
- Party: Bharatiya Janata Party
- Profession: Politician

Jai Prakash Nishad is an Indian politician and a member of Legislative Assembly of Deoria, Uttar Pradesh of India. He represents the Rudrapur constituency of Uttar Pradesh and is a member of the Bhartiya Janata Party.

== Political career ==
Nishad was MLA for three terms. Since 1991, he represents Rudrapur constituency as a member of Bhartiya Janata Party. In first term 1991 (11th Legislative Assembly of Uttar Pradesh), elections he defeated Janata Dal candidate Ram Shankar Vidyarthi by a margin of 4,174 votes.

In second term 1996 (13th Legislative Assembly of Uttar Pradesh), elections he again defeated Ram Shankar Vidyarthi candidate of Bahujan Samaj Party by a margin of 9,161 votes.

In third term 2017 (17th Legislative Assembly of Uttar Pradesh), elections he defeated Indian National Congress candidate Akhilesh Pratap Singh by a margin of 26,789 votes.

Nishad got the ministries of Animal Husbandry and Fisheries, Estate Department, Urban land in Yogi Adityanath ministry.

== Posts held ==
#	From	To	Position	Comments
01	June 1991	December 1992	Member, 11th Legislative Assembly of Uttar Pradesh	
02	October 1996	March 2002	Member, 13th Legislative Assembly of Uttar Pradesh	
03	March 2017	Incumbent	Member, 17th Legislative Assembly of Uttar Pradesh, Minister of State in Government Of Uttar Pradesh	
