= Salempur, Uttar Pradesh =

Salempur City Salempur Nagar Panchayat
- Town
- Nickname: Salempur
- Location in Uttar Pradesh, India Salempur City (India)
- Coordinates: 26°18′N 83°55′E
- Country: India
- State: Uttar Pradesh
- District: Deoria
- Established: 1939

Government
  - Type: District Administration

Area
  - Total: 485 km^{2} (187 sq mi)

Population (2011)
  - Total: 604,483
  - Density: 1,250/km^{2} (3,230/sq mi)

Languages
  - Official: Hindi, Bhojpuri
- Time zone: UTC+5:30 (IST)
- Postal code: 274509
- Vehicle registration: UP-52
- Website: deoria.nic.in

Salempur City is a Tehsil Headquarter in Deoria district under Gorakhpur Division. It constitutes as 71 Parliamentary Constituency which covers Vidhan Sabha of Salempur and Bhatpar Rani in Deoria district and Belthara Road, Sikanderpur and Bansdih of Ballia District. Salempur is a Nagar Panchayat and a Block headquarter in Deoria district in the Indian state of Uttar Pradesh.

== Demographics ==
In the past Salempur was one of the biggest Tehsils. But later it separated into three new Tehsils- Barhaj, Rudrapur and Bhatpar Rani one by one. To facilitate the administration, Salempur Tehsil is further divided into four towns and 522 villages. As of the 2011 Census of India Salempur Tehsil of Deoria district has total population of 604,483. Out of which 298,212 are males while 306,271 are females. In 2011 there were total 91,896 families residing in Salempur Tehsil. The Average Sex Ratio of Salempur Tehsil is 1,027. As per the 2011 census out of total population, 14.2% people lives in urban areas while 85.8% lives in the rural areas. The average literacy rate in urban areas is 76.6% while that in the rural areas is 72.9%. Also the sex ratio of urban areas in Salempur Tehsil is 951 while that of rural areas is 1,040.

The population of children of age 0–6 years in Salempur Tehsil is 87153 which is 14% of the total population. There are 45363 male children and 41790 female children between the age 0–6 years. Thus as per the 2011 the Child Sex Ratio of Salempur Tehsil is 921 which is less than Average Sex Ratio ( 1,027 ) of Salempur Tehsil. The total literacy rate of Salempur Tehsil is 73.43%. The male literacy rate is 72.31% and the female literacy rate is 53.62% in Salempur Tehsil.

Salempur town in Deoria district of Uttar Pradesh is known for the Shiva temple at nearby Dirgheshwernath. In addition, Salempur town is located on the west side near Majhauli Raj, sharing history with the rulers of the aforementioned state before the independence of India in 1947.

== Administration ==
The town has the following wards. Local self-government is at the level of Nagar Panchayat and every five years, people of each faith elect their representatives for their wards.

=== Salempur Nagarpanchayat Wards ===
#	Ward	Sub Division	District	State
1	Ward No – 1	Salempur	Deoria	Uttar Pradesh
2	Ward No – 2	Salempur	Deoria	Uttar Pradesh
3	Ward No – 3	Salempur	Deoria	Uttar Pradesh
4	Ward No – 4	Salempur	Deoria	Uttar Pradesh
5	Ward No – 5	Salempur	Deoria	Uttar Pradesh
6	Ward No – 6	Salempur	Deoria	Uttar Pradesh
7	Ward No – 7	Salempur	Deoria	Uttar Pradesh
8	Ward No – 8	Salempur	Deoria	Uttar Pradesh
9	Ward No – 9	Salempur	Deoria	Uttar Pradesh
10	Ward No – 10	Salempur	Deoria	Uttar Pradesh
11	Ward No – 11	Salempur	Deoria	Uttar Pradesh
12	Ward No – 12	Salempur	Deoria	Uttar Pradesh
13	Ward No – 13	Salempur	Deoria	Uttar Pradesh

=== Salempur Nagar Panchayat Religion Data 2011 ===
Town	Population	Hindu	Muslim	Christian	Sikh	Buddhist	Jain	Others	Not Stated
Salempur	22526	92.68%	7.12%	0.06%	0.06%	0.04%	0.00%	0.02%	0.02%

== See also ==
- Awadhesh Pratap Mall, Member of Legislative Assembly (1967) and (1985)
- Ram Naresh Kushwaha, Member of Parliament (1977)
- Murad Lari, Member of Legislative Assembly (1997-2001)
- Hari Kewal Prasad , Member of Parliament (2004 - 2009)
- Ramashankar Rajbhar, Member of Parliament (2024 - present)
