= Awadhesh Pratap Mall =

Indian politician

Member of the Uttar Pradesh Legislative Assembly
- In office 1967–1969
- Succeeded by: Shiv Bacchan
- Constituency: Salempur
- In office 1969–1974
- Preceded by: Ugra Sen
- Succeeded by: Surendra Prasad Mishra
- Constituency: Barhaj
- In office 1985–1989
- Preceded by: Durga Prasad Mishra
- Succeeded by: Suresh Yadav
- Constituency: Salempur

Personal details
- Born: Majhauli Raj, British India
- Died: Deoria district, Uttar Pradesh, India
- Party: Indian National Congress Party
- Profession: Politician
- House: Vishen

Awadhesh Pratap Mall was the ruler of Majhauli Raj in the Deoria district before the state merged with the former British provinces as Uttar Pradesh in 1947 when India became independent from British rule. After independence, he was a member of the Indian National Congress party and won multiple elections to the Uttar Pradesh Legislative Assembly.

== Early life ==
Awadhesh Pratap Mall was born in the early 1900s in Majhauli Raj as the descendant of Raja Dev Narain Mall who was a well known ruler of the aforementioned state in 1857. Mall was 117th ruler of Majhauli.

== Political career ==
Mall won a seat in the Uttar Pradesh Legislative Assembly in 1967 from Salempur constituency in Deoria district. He later won a seat in the Uttar Pradesh legislative assembly in the 1969 election from Barhaj. He did not win elections after 1974, but regained the Salempur seat by winning in the Uttar Pradesh Legislative Assembly election in 1985 as an Indian National Congress party candidate.

== Personal life and death ==
Mall married Maharani Bhuvneshwari Devi. He died in early 2000s in Deoria district.
