= Sant Prasad =

Indian politician

Member of the Uttar Pradesh Legislative Assembly
- In office 2012–2022
- Constituency: Khajani
- In office October 1996 – March 2002
- Preceded by: Molai
- Succeeded by: Sadal Prasad
- Constituency: Bansgaon

Personal details
- Born: 1 January 1955 (age 71) Bhadar Khas, Gorakhpur district, Uttar Pradesh
- Party: Bharatiya Janta Party
- Spouse: Kushmati Devi
- Children: 3 sons, 1 daughter
- Parent: Late Munesar Prasad
- Education: Post Graduate from Jabalpur University
- Profession: Politician

Sant Prasad is an Indian politician and member of the Bharatiya Janata Party. Prasad is a member of the Uttar Pradesh Legislative Assembly from the Khajani constituency in Gorakhpur district.

== Political career ==
Prasad has been a member of the 13th, 16th and 17th Legislative Assembly of Uttar Pradesh. Since 2012, he has represented the Khajani constituency and is a member of the Bhartiya Janata Party.

- in 1996 (13th Legislative Assembly of Uttar Pradesh), elections Prasad defeated Janata Dal candidate Sadal Prasad by a margin of 11,034 votes.
- in 2002 (14th Legislative Assembly of Uttar Pradesh), elections Prasad lost his seat to Bahujan Samaj Party candidate Sadal Prasad by a margin of 21,739 votes.
- in 2007 (15th Legislative Assembly of Uttar Pradesh), elections he again lost to Bahujan Samaj Party candidate Sadal Prasad by a margin of 2,284 votes.
- he was again elected from newly created constituency Khajani (Assembly constituency) in 2012 (16th Legislative Assembly of Uttar Pradesh) elections, Prasad defeated Bahujan Samaj Party candidate Ram Samujh by a margin of 9,436 votes.
- in 2017 (17th Legislative Assembly of Uttar Pradesh) elections, he again defeated Bahujan Samaj Party candidate Rajkumar by a margin of 20,079 votes.

== Posts held ==
#	From	To	Position	Comments
01	October 1996	March 2002	Member, 13th Legislative Assembly of Uttar Pradesh	
02	March 2012	March 2017	Member, 16th Legislative Assembly of Uttar Pradesh	
03	March 2017	March 2022	Member, 17th Legislative Assembly of Uttar Pradesh	
