= Mahadeo Prasad =

Indian politician

Member of Parliament, Lok Sabha
- In office 1957-1967
- Succeeded by: Mohlu Prasad
- Constituency: Bansgaon, Uttar Pradesh

Personal details
- Born: August 1901 Sariya Sardarnagar, Gorakhpur District, British India (present-day Uttar Pradesh, India)
- Party: Indian National Congress
- Spouse: Anuraji Devi

Mahadeo Prasad is an Indian politician. He was elected to the Lok Sabha, the lower house of the Parliament of India from the Bansgaon constituency of Uttar Pradesh as a member of the Indian National Congress.
