= Ram Surat Prasad =

Indian politician

Member of Parliament, Lok Sabha
- In office 1971–1977
- Preceded by: Mohlu Prasad
- Succeeded by: Visharad Phirangi Prasad
- Constituency: Bansgaon, Uttar Pradesh

Personal details
- Born: 9 February 1925
- Party: Indian National Congress
- Spouse: Premawati Devi

Ram Surat Prasad (born 9 February 1925) is an Indian politician. He was elected to the Lok Sabha, the lower house of the Parliament of India from the Bansgaon constituency of Uttar Pradesh as a member of the Indian National Congress.
