= Salempur Lok Sabha constituency =

Constituency of the Indian parliament in Uttar Pradesh

Coordinates: 26.3°N 83.92°E

Salempur UP-71
- Lok Sabha constituency
- Interactive Map Outlining Salempur Lok Sabha constituency

Constituency details
- Country: India
- Region: North India
- State: Uttar Pradesh
- Assembly constituencies: Bhatpar Rani; Salempur; Belthara Road; Sikanderpur; Bansdih
- Established: 1952
- Reservation: None

Member of Parliament
- 18th Lok Sabha
- Incumbent Ramashankar Rajbhar
- Party: Samajwadi Party
- Elected year: 2024

Salempur Lok Sabha constituency is one of the 80 Lok Sabha (parliamentary) constituencies in Uttar Pradesh in India.

== Assembly segments ==
Presently, Salempur Lok Sabha constituency comprises five Vidhan Sabha (legislative assembly) segments. These are:

No	Name	District	Member	Party	2024 Lead
340	Bhatpar Rani	Deoria	Sabha Kushwaha	BJP	BJP
341	Salempur (SC)	Deoria	Vijay Laxmi Gautam	BJP	SP
357	Belthara Road (SC)	Ballia	Hansu Ram	SBSP	SP
359	Sikanderpur	Ballia	Jiyauddin Rizvi	SP	SP
362	Bansdih	Ballia	Ketakee Singh	BJP	BJP

== Members of Parliament ==
Year	Member	Party
1952	Bishwanath Roy	Indian National Congress
1957	Bishwanath Roy	Indian National Congress
1962	Vishwanath Pandey	Indian National Congress
1967	Vishwanath Pandey	Indian National Congress
1971	Tarkeshwar Pandey	Indian National Congress
1977	Ram Naresh Kushwaha	Janata Party
1980	Ram Nagina Mishra	Indian National Congress
1984	Ram Nagina Mishra	Indian National Congress
1989	Hari Kewal Prasad	Janata Dal
1991	Hari Kewal Prasad	Janata Dal
1996	Harivansh Sahay	Samajwadi Party
1998	Hari Kewal Prasad	Samata Party
1999	Babban Rajbhar	Bahujan Samaj Party
2004	Hari Kewal Prasad	Samajwadi Party
2009	Ramashankar Rajbhar	Bahujan Samaj Party
2014	Ravindra Kushwaha	Bharatiya Janata Party
2019	Ravindra Kushwaha	Bharatiya Janata Party
2024	Ramashankar Rajbhar	Samajwadi Party

== Election results ==
=== 2024 ===
2024 Indian general elections: Salempur
Party	Candidate	Votes	%	±%
SP	Ramashankar Rajbhar	405,472	44.20	▲44.20
BJP	Ravindra Kushwaha	4,01,899	43.81	▼6.91
BSP	Bhim Rajbhar	80,599	8.79	▼29.73
NOTA	None of the Above	7,549	0.82	▼0.03
Majority		3,573	0.38	▼11.81
Turnout		917,362	51.25	▼4.18
SP gain from BJP		Swing		

=== 2019 ===
2019 Indian general elections: Salempur
Party	Candidate	Votes	%	±%
BJP	Ravindra Kushwaha	467,940	50.72	+4.83
BSP	R. S. Kushwaha	3,55,325	38.52	+19.82
SBSP	Rajaram	33,568	3.64	−4.09
INC	Rajesh Kumar Mishra	27,363	2.97	−1.93
IND.	Sunil Kumar Pandey	6,276	0.68	N/A
NOTA	None of the Above	7,809	0.85	−0.12
Majority		1,12,615	12.20	−14.99
Turnout		9,24,101	55.43	+3.93
BJP hold		Swing	+4.83	

=== 2014 ===
2014 Indian general elections: Salempur
Party	Candidate	Votes	%	±%
BJP	Ravindra Kushwaha	3,92,213	45.89	
BSP	Ravi Shanker Singh (Pappu)	1,59,871	18.70	
SP	Haribansh Sahai Kushwaha	1,59,688	18.68	
SBSP	Om Prakash Rajbhar	66,084	7.73	
INC	Dr. Bhola Pandey	41,890	4.90	
NOTA	None of the Above	8,322	0.97	
Majority		2,32,342	27.19	
Turnout		8,55,776	51.50	
BJP gain from BSP		Swing		

=== 2009 ===
2009 Indian general elections: Salempur
Party	Candidate	Votes	%	±%
BSP	Ramashankar Rajbhar	175,088	27.6	
INC	Dr. Bhola Pandey	156,783	24.7	
SP	Hari Kewal Prasad	135,414	21.3	
JD(U)	Ravishankar Singh	89,612	14.1	
SBSP	Fate Bahadur	16,240	2.6	
PECP	Izhar	10,958	1.7	
Majority		18,305	2.9	
Turnout		6,35,226	39.2	
BSP gain from SP		Swing		

== See also ==
- Ballia district
- List of constituencies of the Lok Sabha
