= Barhaj Assembly constituency =

Constituency of the Uttar Pradesh legislative assembly in India

Coordinates: 26.28°N 83.72°E

Barhaj
- Constituency No. 342 for the Uttar Pradesh Legislative Assembly

Constituency details
- Country: India
- Region: North India
- State: Uttar Pradesh
- District: Deoria
- Reservation: None

Member of Legislative Assembly
- 18th Uttar Pradesh Legislative Assembly
- Incumbent Deepak Kumar Mishra
- Party: Bharatiya Janta Party
- Elected year: 2022

Barhaj is a constituency of the Uttar Pradesh Legislative Assembly covering the city of Barhaj in the Deoria district of Uttar Pradesh, India. Barhaj is one of five assembly constituencies in the Bansgaon Lok Sabha constituency. Since 2008, this assembly constituency is numbered 342 amongst 403 constituencies. Bharatiya Janta Party candidate Deepak Mishra won in last Assembly election of 2022 Uttar Pradesh Legislative Elections.

== Members of Legislative Assembly ==
Year	Member	Party
1967	Ugra Sen	Samyukta Socialist Party
1969	Awadhesh Pratap Mall	Indian National Congress
1974	Surendra Prasad Mishra	Indian National Congress
1977	Mohan Singh	Janata Party
1980	Mohan Singh	Janata Party (Secular)
1985	Surendra Prasad Mishra	Indian National Congress
1989	Swami Nath	Independent
1991	Durga Prasad Mishra	Bharatiya Janata Party
1993	Swami Nath	Samajwadi Party
1996	Prem Prakash Singh	Bahujan Samaj Party
2002	Durga Prasad Mishra	Independent
2007	Ram Prasad Jaisawal	Bahujan Samaj Party
2012	Prem Prakash Singh	Samajwadi Party
2017	Suresh Tiwari	Bharatiya Janata Party
2022	Deepak Kumar Mishra	Bharatiya Janata Party

== Election results ==
=== 2027 ===
2027 Uttar Pradesh Legislative Assembly election: Barhaj
Party	Candidate	Votes	%	±%
INDIA				
NDA				
BSP				
NOTA	None of the above			
Majority				
Turnout				
gain from		Swing		

=== 2022 ===
2022 Uttar Pradesh Legislative Assembly election: Barhaj
Party	Candidate	Votes	%	±%
BJP	Deepak Kumar Mishra "Shaka"	85,758	46.33	▲9.57
SP	Murli Manohar Jaiswal	68,897	37.22	▲20.76
BSP	Vinay Lalsahab Tiwari	23,287	12.58	▼17.24
INC	Ramjee Giri	2,079	1.12	
NOTA	None of the above	1,847	1.0	▲0.2
Majority		16,861	9.11	▲2.17
Turnout		185,108	58.11	▲0.49
BJP hold				

=== 2017 ===
2017 Uttar Pradesh Legislative Assembly Election: Barhaj
Party	Candidate	Votes	%	±%
BJP	Suresh Tiwari	61,996	36.76	
BSP	Murli Manohar Jaiswal	50,280	29.82	
SP	Purnendu Tiwari Urf P.D.Tiwari	27,761	16.46	
Independent	Girendra Pratap Yadav	18,489	10.96	
CPI	Jai Prakash Kushwaha	2,106	1.25	
NOTA	None of the above	1,338	0.8	
Majority		11,716	6.94	
Turnout		168,628	57.62	
