= Majhauli Raj =

- Town
- Location in purvanchal , India
- Coordinates: 26.296801°N 83.957176°E
- Country: India
- State: Uttar Pradesh
- District: Deoria

Population (2001)
  - Total: 17,200

Languages
  - Official: Hindi
  - Local: Bhojpuri
- Time zone: UTC+5:30 (IST)
- PIN: 274506
- Telephone code: 05566
- Vehicle registration: UP-52

Majhauli Raj is a town and a nagar panchayat in Deoria district in the Indian state of Uttar Pradesh.

The temple of Baba Dirgheswar Nath, a deity of Shiva is nearby. It is believed to have been found and worshipped by Ashwathama, a character in the epic Mahabharata.

== History ==
Majhauli Raj was the seat of an eponymous Vishen/Bisen feudal estate known as the Majhauli Raj, which is said to have been founded around 1100 to 1300 CE. King Vishwasen was a son of a Kshatriya Malla King (Estimated Around 1000 to 1200 BCE), one of the sole king of Malla Desh or Malla Bhumi or Malla Rastra (Later known as Malla Mahajanpad), had ruled prior to Mahajanpad Era from Kushinagar as capital of eastern Koshala. Later one of descendant of King Vishwa Sen (i.e.most probably 86th generation) King Bhim Malla went to conquer the pargana of Salempur, Uttar Pradesh and Majhauli, where he founded a fort and established the Majhauli Raj around 1100 to 1300 CE. One branch of this dynasty comes from a founder named Mayyur who has been variously described as a Brahmin, Bhumihar or even a Bhat. He had come from Kashi to Kushinara had children with four wives: One Brahmin, one Malla princess (name may be Suryaprabha), one more Bhumihar Malla, as well as one Rajput Malla. His son from his Bhumihar wife named King Bir Sen (Estimated 600 BCE ) founder of Baghochia Royal Dynasty and his descendants established Bans Gaon Estate (Dileepnagar Estate), Hathwa Raj and Tamkuhi raj and started Bhumihar branch. Raja Bir Sen was the overall ruler of Malla Mahajanpada and he was supported by his other brothers from different mothers. One son from his Malla princess name King Vishwasen founder of Vishwasen Rajput dynasty and his descendant (probably 86th generation) King Bhim Dev stablished Majhuli Raj, One son from his Brahmin wife went on to become the ancestor of the Misra Brahmins; and the son from his Kurmi concubine went on to found the Kakradih estate.

The branch of this Suryavanshi Kshatriya comes from a founder named Chandraketu, son of Lord Lakshman who was the younger brother of Lord Ram. Raja Vishwasen founder of Vishen/Bisen Kshatriya dynasty was the overall ruler of Malla Mahajanpad King Vishwasen hailed from the Malla kingdom and was a Malla King. He established the Kakradih Estate, the first kingdom of the Vishen/Bisen lineage. This is why, until recent times, soil from Kakradih near Madhuban has been taken and used in Majhauli Raj during the crown coronation ceremony. His descendant (probably 86th generation) King Bhim Dev established Kingdom of Majhauli Raj in 11th century. As the Vishen/Bisen Kshatriyas are the descendants of King Vishwasen they still puts this name as a surname i.e. Vishen/Bisen short form of Vishwasen in their names. They are Solar dynasty Suryavanshi Kshatriya and claimed to be the sons of God Lakshman from his one of the son Chandraketu (had got title 'Malla' for being extraordinary wrestler or fighter of that time) who was ruler of Malla Rastra or Malla Mahajanpad in ancient India. Later many kings who were of Majhauli Kingdom established many estates of names Raja Hanumant Singh Kalakankar (Estate), Taluq Kunwar Ajmat Singh Mankapur (Estate), Taluq Rai Sabal Shah Bhadri (Estate), Raja Madhav Mall Madhuban (Zamindari Estate), Taluq Kunwar Bhawani Singh Bhinga (Estate), and many more in north India. In 1774, the Raja of Majhauli, Ajit Mal, openly refused to pay revenue to the amil (collector) in Gorakhpur, crossing over into Bihar whenever the officials attempted to collect payment. He also gave refuge to the Kurmis of Saran, who were openly in arms against the British East India Company. In 1777, Ajit Mal also refused to pay revenues to the British for his lands in Bihar. The British, already beleaguered by the ongoing rebellion of Fateh Sahi of the Huseypur (Hathwa) raj, were initially unwilling to go after Ajit Mal: while they charged Fateh Sahi "guilty of the atrocious crime of premeditated murder and rebellion", they held Ajit Mal guilty of "no offence". When the authorities in Gorakhpur in Oudh State asked for assistance in pursuing Ajit Mal, the British refused. However, when the Gorakhpur authorities offered to join the fight against Fateh Sahi if the British helped them capture Ajit Mal, the British quickly agreed. They were, however, unsuccessful in both measures.

== Administration ==
The town has 13 wards. Local self-government is at the level of Nagar Panchayat and every five years, people elect their representatives for their wards. The tehsil-level administration is located at Salempur. It has its district headquarters at Deoria.

== See also ==
- Awadhesh Pratap Mall
