= Bansgaon =

- Town
- Location in Uttar Pradesh, India
- Coordinates: 26.56°N 83.35°E
- Country: India
- State: Uttar Pradesh
- District: Gorakhpur

Government
  - Type: BJP =
- Elevation: 68 m (223 ft)

Population (2010)
  - Total: 25,000

Languages
  - Official: Hindi
- Time zone: UTC+5:30 (IST)
- PIN: 273403

Bansgaon is a town and a Nagar Panchayat in Gorakhpur District in the state of Uttar Pradesh, India. Originally, it is said that the place was occupied by Shrinet Rajputs, who still commemorate their conquest by assembling in the month of Asvina to offer sacrifice (blood) at the ancient temple of Kuldevi (bansgoan).Shrinet Rajputs are originally from Srinagar, Uttarakhand.

== Geography ==
Bansgaon is located at 26.56°N 83.35°E. It has an average elevation of 68 metres (223 feet).

== Demographics ==
As of 2001 India census, Bansgaon had a population of 14,086. Males constitute 51% of the population and females 49%. Bansgaon has an average literacy rate of 59%, lower than the national average of 59.5%; with 59% of the males and 41% of females literate. 17% of the population is under 6 years of age.

== Culture ==
An ancient tradition has been noticed in Bansgaon which is carried out by the Shrinet Rajputs. According to the tradition, Women from the Shrinet families go to the Goddess Durga temple for worshipping on the day of Ashtami (2nd last day of Navratri puja) and Men from the Shrinet Families offer their blood to Goddess Durga at the shrine present in the Village on the day of Tithi Navmi(last day of Navratri puja).

== See also ==
- Unwal and Unaula Khas, two nearby villages
