= Rudrapur, Nepal =

Rudrapur रूद्रपुर
- Kanchan Rural Municipality
- Location in Nepal
- Coordinates: 27.64°N 83.25°E
- Country: Nepal
- Province: Lumbini Province
- District: Rupandehi District

Population (1991)
  - Total: 14,060
- Time zone: UTC+5:45 (Nepal Time)

Rudrapur was a village development committee in Rupandehi District in Lumbini Province of southern Nepal. It is located about 30 km south west from butwal and 20 km north from Lumbini. Haraiya bazar, Thakali chowck and Gargare are the major trade and business center of this village . At the time of the 1991 Nepal census it had a population of 14,060 people living in 2539 individual households but in 2074 BS/2017 AD Rudrapur VDC merged with Gazedi VDC and became Kanchan Rural municipality.
