= Raj Narain Passi =

Indian politician

Member of Parliament, Lok Sabha
- In office (1991-1996), (1998-1999), (1999 – 2004)
- Preceded by: Mahaveer Prasad
- Succeeded by: Mahaveer Prasad
- Constituency: Bansgaon, Uttar Pradesh

Personal details
- Born: 6 February 1949 (age 77) Parasadad, Gorakhpur District, Uttar Pradesh
- Party: Bharatiya Janata Party

Raj Narain Passi is an Indian politician. He was elected to the Lok Sabha, lower house of the Parliament of India from Bansgaon, Uttar Pradesh as a member of the Bharatiya Janata Party.
