= Rudrapur, Uttar Pradesh =

Rudrapur Rudraksh Vatika
- Town
- Location in Uttar Pradesh, India
- Coordinates: 26.4293°N 83.6104°E
- Country: India
- State: Uttar Pradesh
- District: Deoria

Population (2011)
  - Total: 34,014

Languages
  - Official: Hindi
- Time zone: UTC+5:30 (IST)
- Postal code: 264204
- Vehicle registration: UP-52
- Website: up.gov.in

Rudrapur is a town and a nagar panchayat in Deoria district in the Indian state of Uttar Pradesh.

== Demographics ==
As per the 2011 census of India, Rudrapur had a population of 34,014. Males constitute 50% of the population and females 50%. The town has an average literacy rate of 67%, which is lower than the national average of 74%. Split amongst gender, male literacy is 73% and female literacy is 61%. In Rudrapur, 18% of the population is under 6 years of age.

== Notable people ==
- Jai Prakash Nishad (born 1960), member of Legislative Assembly of Deoria.
- Shiv Pratap Shukla (born 1952), former finance minister.
- Suresh Tiwari (born 1946), member of 15th and 17th Legislative Assembly of Deoria.
- Baleshwar Yadav (born 1942), member for Padrauna, 14th Lok Sabha.
