= Rampur Karkhana =

Dumari
- Town
- Location in Uttar Pradesh, India
- Coordinates: 26°34′N 83°48′E
- Country: India
- State: Uttar Pradesh
- District: Deoria

Population (2011)
  - Total: 9,943

Languages
  - Official: Hindi
- Time zone: UTC+5:30 (IST)

Rampur Karkhana is a town and a nagar panchayat in Deoria district in the Indian state of Uttar Pradesh.

== Demographics ==
As of 2001 India census, Rampur Karkhana had a population of 9598. Males constitute 52% of the population and females 48%. Rampur Karkhana has an average literacy rate of 75%, : male literacy is 82%, and female literacy is 73%. In Rampur Karkhana, 19% of the population is under 6 years of age.
