= Bhatpar Rani =

- Town
- Location in Uttar Pradesh, India
- Coordinates: 26.310343°N 84.029789°E
- Country: India
- State: Uttar Pradesh
- District: Deoria
- Named for: The Queen of the town

Government
  - Body: Sabhakunwar Kushawaha (MLA)

Population (2011)
  - Total: 14,839

Language
  - Official: Hindi
- Time zone: UTC+5:30 (IST)
- 274702PIN: 274702
- Vehicle registration: UP52
- Lok Sabha constituency: Salempur

Bhatpar Rani is a tehsil headquarter in Deoria District in the state of Uttar Pradesh, India. It represents one of the constituencies of the Uttar Pradesh Legislative Assembly within Deoria district.

== Geography ==
Bhatpar Rani is a Nagar Panchayat and a Block headquarter in Deoria district, Uttar Pradesh. It belongs to Gorakhpur Division. It is a town located on the west side of Bihar border.

== Demographics ==
Bhatpar Rani is divided into 12 wards in which elections are held every 5 years. Bhatpar Rani (NP) has a population of 14,839, of which 7,692 are males and 7,147 are females.

As of the 2011 Indian census, the population of children aged 0–6 is 1,962, which is 13.22% of the total population of Bhatpar Rani (NP). In Bhatpar Rani Nagar Panchayat, the female sex ratio is 929 compared to the state average of 912. Moreover, the child sex ratio is around 960, compared to the Uttar Pradesh state average of 902. The literacy rate is 80.71%, higher than the state average of 67.68%. In Bhatpar Rani, male literacy is around 86.94% while the female literacy rate is 73.97%.

Bhatpar Rani, at the level of (NP), handles the administration of over 2,201 houses to which it supplies basic amenities like water and sewerage. It is also authorized to build roads within the Nagar Panchayat limits and impose taxes on properties coming under its jurisdiction.

== Transportation ==
Bhatpar Rani has a railway station - Bhatpar Rani which connects this location to various major cities like Lucknow, Delhi etc via trains.

== See also ==
- Ashutosh Upadhyay
- Sabhakunwar Kushawaha
