= Rudrapur, Uttar Pradesh Assembly constituency =

Constituency of the Uttar Pradesh legislative assembly in India

Coordinates: 26.44°N 83.61°E

Rudrapur
- Constituency No. 336 for the Uttar Pradesh Legislative Assembly

Constituency details
- Country: India
- Region: North India
- State: Uttar Pradesh
- District: Deoria
- Total electors: 3,21,349
- Reservation: None

Member of Legislative Assembly
- 18th Uttar Pradesh Legislative Assembly
- Incumbent Jai Prakash Nishad
- Party: Bharatiya Janta Party
- Elected year: 2017

Rudrapur is a constituency of Deoria covering the city of Rudrapur in the Deoria district of Uttar Pradesh, India.

Rudrapur is one of five assembly constituencies in the Bansgaon Lok Sabha constituency. Since 2008, this assembly constituency is numbered 336 amongst 403 constituencies.

== Members of Legislative Assembly ==
Year	Member	Party
1962	Chandrabali	Socialist Party
1967	Sita Ram	Indian National Congress
1969	Sita Ram	Indian National Congress
1974	Rajendra Prasad Gupta	Indian National Congress
1977	Pradeep Kumar	Janata Party
1980	Bhasker Pandey	Indian National Congress (I)
1985	Gorakh Nath	Indian National Congress
1989	Mukti Nath Yadav	Janata Dal
1991	Jai Prakash Nishad	Bharatiya Janata Party
1993	Mukti Nath Yadav	Samajwadi Party
1996	Jai Prakash Nishad	Bharatiya Janata Party
2002	Anugrah Narain Singh	Samajwadi Party
2007	Suresh Tiwari	Bahujan Samaj Party
2012	Akhilesh Pratap Singh	Indian National Congress
2017	Jai Prakash Nishad	Bharatiya Janata Party
2022	Jai Prakash Nishad	Bharatiya Janata Party

== Election results ==
=== 2027 ===
2027 Uttar Pradesh Legislative Assembly election: Rudrapur
Party	Candidate	Votes	%	±%
INDIA				
NDA				
BSP				
NOTA	None of the above			
Majority				
Turnout				
gain from		Swing		

=== 2022 ===
2022 Uttar Pradesh Legislative Assembly election: Rudrapur
Party	Candidate	Votes	%	±%
BJP	Jai Prakash Nishad	78,187	42.99	▼4.32
SP	Rambhual Nishad	36,251	19.93	
INC	Akhilesh Pratap Singh	31,177	17.14	▼13.87
BSP	Suresh Tiwari	20,093	11.05	▼2.99
Independent	Pradeep Yadav	9,598	5.28	
NOTA	None of the above	1,629	0.9	▼0.68
Majority		41,936	23.06	▲6.76
Turnout		181,863	56.59	▲0.53
BJP hold		Swing		

=== 2017 ===
2017 Uttar Pradesh Legislative Election was won by the Bharatiya Janta Party candidate Jai Prakash Nishad defeating Indian National Congress candidate Akhilesh Pratap Singh by a margin of 26,789 votes.

2017 Uttar Pradesh Legislative Assembly Election: Rudrapu
Party	Candidate	Votes	%	±%
BJP	Jai Prakash Nishad	77,754	47.31	
INC	Akhilesh Pratap Singh	50,965	31.01	
BSP	Chandrika Nishad	23,081	14.04	
NISHAD	Kaushal Pandey	2,591	1.58	
Independent	Veer Sen Singh Yadav	1,856	1.13	
NOTA	None of the above	2,561	1.58	
Majority		26,789	16.3	
Turnout		164,353	56.06	
