= Vimlesh Paswan =

Indian politician

MLA, 18th Legislative Assembly
- Incumbent
- Assumed office March 2017
- Preceded by: Dr. Vijay Kumar
- Constituency: Bansgaon, Gorakhpur

Personal details
- Born: June 27, 1980 (age 45) Gorakhpur, Uttar Pradesh
- Party: Bharatiya Janata Party
- Spouse: Dr.Mohita Paswan (m. 2013)
- Children: 2 daughters
- Parent: Om Prakash Paswan
- Occupation: MLA
- Profession: Politician

Vimlesh Paswan is an Indian politician and a member of 18th Uttar Pradesh Assembly of Uttar Pradesh of India. He represents the Bansgaon constituency of Uttar Pradesh and is a member of the Bharatiya Janata Party.

== Political career ==
Paswan has been a member of the 17th Legislative Assembly of Uttar Pradesh. Since 2017, he has represented the Bansgaon constituency and is a member of the BJP. He defeated Bahujan Samaj Party candidate Dharmendra Kumar by a margin of 22,873 votes.

== Posts held ==
#	From	To	Position	Comments
01	March 2017	March 2022	Member, 17th Legislative Assembly	
02	March 2022	Incumbent	Member, 18th Legislative Assembly	

== See also ==
- Uttar Pradesh Legislative Assembly
