= Barhalganj =

Town in Uttar Pradesh, India

- Town
- Location in Uttar Pradesh, India
- Coordinates: 26°17′N 83°30′E
- Country: India
- State: Uttar Pradesh
- District: Gorakhpur

Government
  - Body: Nagar panchayat

Population (2001)
  - Total: 126,618

Languages
  - Official: Hindi
- Time zone: UTC+5:30 (IST)
- Postal code: 273402

Barhalganj (Hindi pronunciation: [bəɽɦəlgə̃d͡ʒ]) is a town in the municipality of Gorakhpur, Uttar Pradesh. The town is surrounded by several rivers, which are of religious significance to the Hindu population in Uttar Pradesh. Barhalganj is situated on the left bank of the Ghaghra river, a tributary of the Ganges, and the town is connected to the district of Mau by a bridge over the Saryu river.

The town of Barhalganj is situated along NH-29, which links the holy city of Varanasi to the India-Nepal border town of Nautanwa.

== Demographics ==
India's 2001 census indicated that Barhalganj had a population of 19,171. Males constituted 52% of the population and females 48%, with 16% of the population under 6 years of age.

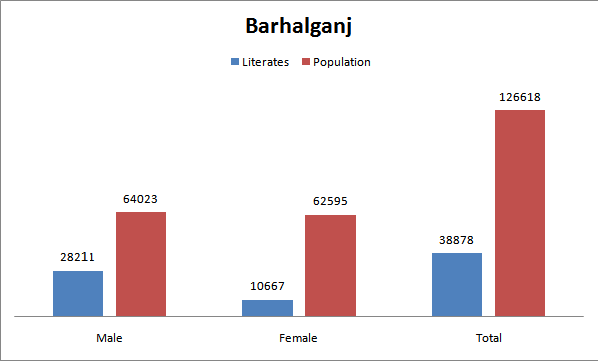
This chart represents Barhalganj population and literacy rate of both male and female as of 2001. Data obtained from gorakhpur.nic.in

Barhalganj (block - as a whole) has a population of 126,618 people with male as 64,023 and female, 62,595. There are also 38,878 literates with 28,211 male and 10,667 females.

Barhalganj has an average literacy rate of 80%, which is significantly higher than the national Indian literacy average of 59.5%. A significant gender imbalance is reflected in the town's overall literacy rates: literacy rates are 58% amongst males, and 42% amongst females.

== Development ==
Although significant development of Barhalganj by the Uttar Pradesh state government began in April 1958, in 2006 the Ministry of Panchayati Raj identified the district of Gorakhpur as India's 250th most impoverished district.

Barhalganj is under the administrative responsibility of Gorakhpur district headquarters, and is one of 34 districts in Uttar Pradesh receiving funds from the Backward Regions Grant Fund Programme (BRGF).

The college, national post graduate college is one of the college in Barhalganj, which is affiliated to DDU GORAKHPUR UNIVERSITY.

== Economy and services ==
The town has a Bazaar that attracts people from nearby villages and towns. Saris purchased at Barhalganj's market are highly coveted within the Gorakpur district.

Education

It has National P. G. College, Barahalganj and National College of Law, Barahalganj both affiliated with DDU Gorakhpur.

== Sports ==
Cricket is the most popular sport in Barhalganj. Barhalganj claims to be one of the first Indian towns to have held an annual local cricket tournament, the Veenu Mankad Tournament during the 1970s. The town has produced national and international cricket players like Vijay Yadav. All India football tournament is conducted by National Sporting Club.

== Cremation Ghat ==
Hindu pilgrims are drawn to the Muktipath Barahalganj., a traditional Hindu crematorium ground on the banks of the sacred Sarayu river, founded by the former state minister and MLA Rajesh Tripathi widely known as Muktipath Wale Baba (a Hindu spiritual leader)विदेशी मुद्रा भंडार 40.8 करोड़ डॉलर बढ़ा | Foreign exchange reserves increased to $ 40.8 million. The Muktipath is one of the most famous cremation ghats in India, desired as a cremation place by millions of Hindus who believe the ghats of the Sarayu river will imbue them with luck in the afterlife.

Traditional Hindu cremation rituals involve a series of complicated processes, including chanting mantras and reciting Hindu prayers to support the deceased person's release from the cycle of reincarnation.
