= Deoria district =

Coordinates: 26°30′36″N 83°46′48″E

- District of Uttar Pradesh
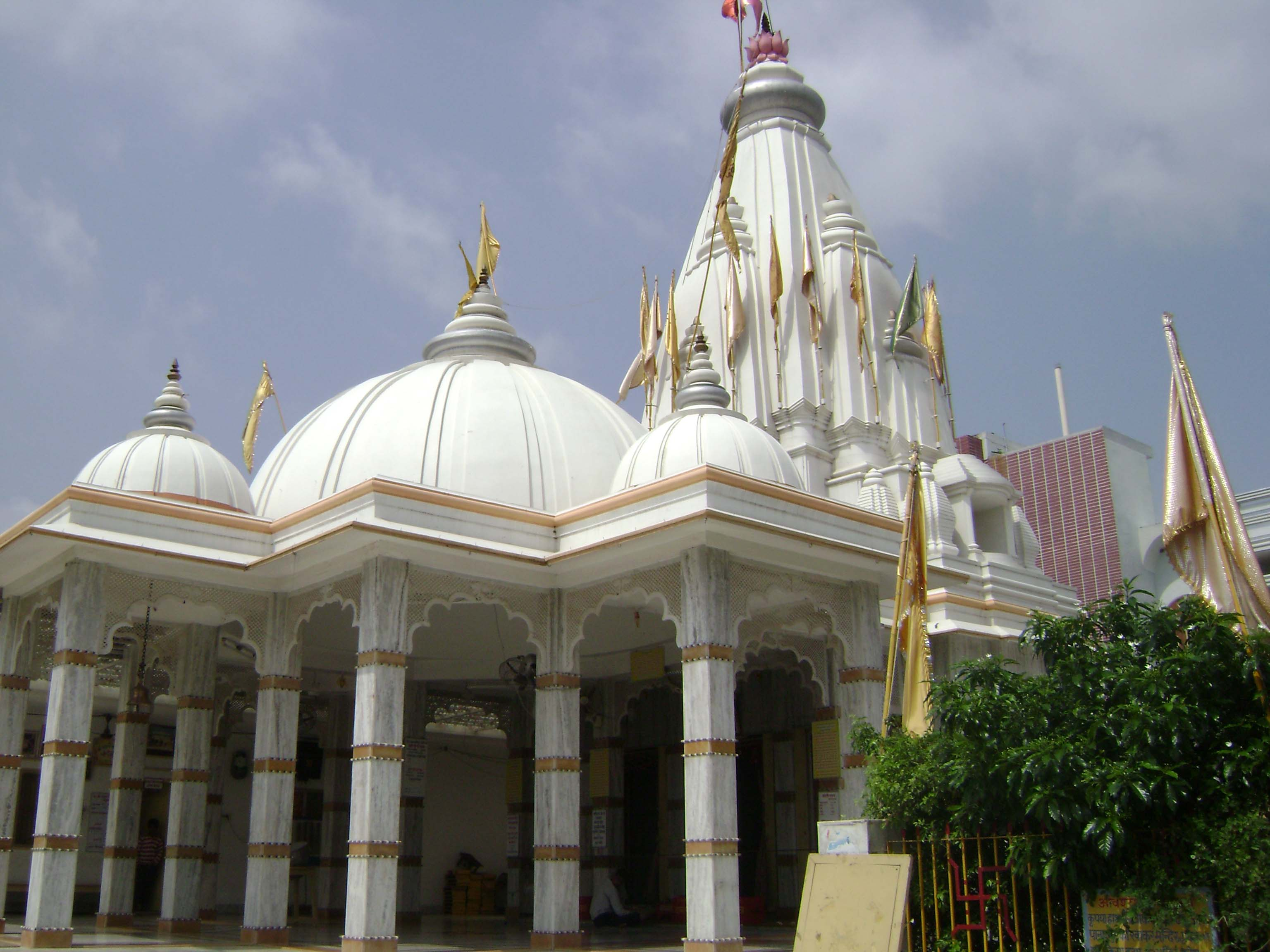
- Shyam Mandir in a Deoria

- Location of Deoria district in Uttar Pradesh
- Country: India
- State: Uttar Pradesh
- Division: Gorakhpur
- Established: 1952
- Headquarters: Deoria

Government
  - Lok Sabha constituencies: Deoria, Salempur, Bansgaon
  - Vidhan Sabha constituencies: Deoria, Rampur Karkhana, Barhaj, Rudrapur, Bhatpar Rani, Salempur, Pathardeva.

Area
  - Total: 2,560 km^{2} (990 sq mi)

Population (2011)
  - Total: 3,100,946
  - Density: 1,210/km^{2} (3,140/sq mi)
  - Urban: 316,803

Demographics
  - Literacy: 73.53%
  - Sex ratio: M:F 1000:1013
- Time zone: UTC+05:30 (IST)
- Vehicle registration: UP-52
- Major highways: NH28, NH 221A, NH 441A
- Average annual precipitation: 864.38 mm
- Website: deoria.nic.in

Deoria district, one of the districts of eastern Uttar Pradesh, India has its headquarters located at Deoria. Deoria is located in eastern Uttar Pradesh and is a part of Gorakhpur division. It came into existence on 16 March 1946 from Gorakhpur district.

== History ==
=== Ancient ===
The area now known as the Deoria District was once a part of the Magadha Kingdom - a prime centre of ancient Aryan culture surrounded by the Himalayas in the north, the Syandika river in the south and the Panchala Kingdom in the west. Apart from the many legends told about this area, archaeological remains, such as statues, coins, bricks, Temples. Most of the People using surname Rao belong to the Kshatriya caste in Deoria Dist,.

The ancient history of the district is related with the Ramayana times when the Lord of Kosala, Ram, appointed his elder son Kusha the king of Kushwati, which is present-day Kushinagar. Before the Mahabharata era, this area had been related with Chakravorty Samrat Mahasudtsan Malla and his kingdom. Kushinagar was well developed and prosperous. Close to the border of his kingdom was the thick forested area called the Mahavan. This area was under the control of the Maurya rulers, the Gupta rulers, the Bihar rulers, and then the Garhwal ruler Govinda Chandra from 1114 AD until 1154 AD.

=== Modern ===
The Deoria district came into existence on 16 March 1946, being separated from the Gorakhpur District. It is believed that the name Deoria is derived from Devaranya or possibly Devpuria. According to official gazetteers, the district was named "Deoria" after its headquarters in Deoria, and the term Deoria generally means a place where there are temples. The name Deoria probably developed because of the existence of important temples in the area. The famous temples & places in Deoria to see are Devraha baba ashram and Dugdheswarnath Mandir. During British rule the district was under the control of Majhauli Royal family and prominent landlords of Kayastha community, with their descendants still owning major chunks of land (Munshi Gorakhnath). Some other families had their impact on various part of the district in which Dubey's of Badkagaon are quite famous. During Freedom struggle of India the district joined struggle under the leadership of Pandit Bibhuti Mani Tripathi of village Dehrauli, Rudrapur.

== Geography ==
Deoria district is located between 26 ° 6' and 26° 48' north latitude to 83° 23' and 84° 16' east longitude. It is surrounded by Kushinagar district in the north, Gopalganj and Siwan districts of Bihar in the east, Mau and Ballia districts in the south and Gorakhpur district in the west. The district has two Nagar Palika Parishad- Deoria and Gaura Barhaj . It has eleven Nagar Panchayats which are tarkulwa, Baitalpur, Hetimpur, Rudrapur, Rampur Karkhana, Bariyarpur, Bhatni Bazar, Bhatpar Rani, Gauri Bazar, Lar, Majhauli Raj and Salempur patherdeva. Hetimpur is a newly created nagar panchayat located at the banks of Chhoti Gandak river near the NH 27.

Ghaghara, Rapti, and Chhoti Gandak are the main rivers in the district.

== Demographics ==
Historical population
Year	Pop.	±% p.a.
1901	749,486	—
1911	816,191	+0.86%
1921	833,199	+0.21%
1931	889,726	+0.66%
1941	992,352	+1.10%
1951	1,059,208	+0.65%
1961	1,190,803	+1.18%
1971	1,410,868	+1.71%
1981	1,749,946	+2.18%
1991	2,184,904	+2.24%
2001	2,714,179	+2.19%
2011	3,100,946	+1.34%

Religions in Deoria district (2011)
Religion	Percent
Hinduism	87.07%
Islam	11.56%
Other or not stated	0.37%

According to the 2011 census Deoria district has a population of 3,100,946. This gives it a ranking of 114th in India (out of a total of 640). The district has a population density of 1,220 inhabitants per square kilometre (3,200/sq mi) . Its population growth rate over the decade 2001-2011 was 14.23%. Deoria has a sex ratio of 1013 females for every 1000 males, and a literacy rate of 73.53%. 10.22% of the population lives in urban areas. Scheduled Castes and Scheduled Tribes make up 15.11% and 3.54% of the population respectively.

=== Languages ===
Languages in Deoria district (2011)
1. Bhojpuri (85.8%)
2. Hindi (12.7%)
3. Urdu (1.40%)
4. Others (0.13%)

At the time of the 2011 Census of India, 85.80% of the population in the district spoke Bhojpuri, 12.67% Hindi and 1.40% Urdu as their first language.

Bhojpuri is the native language of Deoria. The Bhojpuri variant of Kaithi is the indigenous script of Bhojpuri language.

== Notable people ==
- Awadhesh Pratap Mall, Former ruler of Majhauli Raj before 1947.
- Lal Khadag Bahadur Malla, Bhojpuri Author.
- Moti BA, Bhojpuri Poet, lyricist and Musician.
- Noori Mian, Former Bhatni Sugar Mill owner
- Nripendra Misra - Former Principal Secretary to the Prime Minister of India
- Prakash Mani Tripathi - former member of Lok Sabha from Deoria parliamentary constituency.
- Surya Pratap Shahi - Member of 9th, 11th, 13th and 17th Legislative Assembly of Uttar Pradesh. Currently, he is serving as Cabinet Minister in Uttar Pradesh Government with the portfolio of Agriculture, Agriculture Education, and Agriculture Research.
- Shalabh Mani Tripathi Member of 17th legislative Assembly of Uttar Pradesh.

== Colleges ==
- Government Inter College
- Deoraha Baba Medical College
