= List of Indian members of the Indian Civil Service =

This article contains a list of British Indians members of the Indian Civil Service (ICS) in the nineteenth and twentieth centuries.

== 1855–1899 ==
Name	Year of examination	Year of joining	Year of resignation/ disqualification	Rank	Final posting
Satyendranath Tagore	1863	1864		43rd First Indian to qualify for the Indian Civil Service	First Grade Judge and Sessions Judge of Satara. Retired from the Indian Civil Service on 15 January 1897.
Romesh Chunder Dutt	1869	1871		3rd	Officiating Commissioner of Orissa; later Dewan, Baroda. Retired from the Indian Civil Service on 1 August 1897.
Behari Lal Gupta	1869	1871		14th	Sessions judge, Bengal; later chief minister, Baroda
Surendranath Banerjee (later Sir)	1869	1871	1871 (Disqualification)	38th	Minister in the Dyarchy Cabinet in Bengal, 1921–1926
Sripad Babaji Thakur	1869 But gave the final examination in 1870.	1872		39th The first I.C.S from Maharashtra.	Sessions Judge of Shikarpur. Died on 22 July 1889 at Shikarpur.
Anundoram Borooah	1870	1872		38th The first I.C.S from Assam/North-East	District Magistrate and Collector in Bengal
Krishna Govinda Gupta (later Sir)	1871	1873			Commissioner, Bengal; later member, Secretary of State's Council, UK
Brajendranath De	1873	1875		17th	Magistrate and Collector of Hooghly, (1910); also Commissioner (offg.), Burdwan, Bengal (1905)
Cursetjee Rustomjee	1874	1876		10th	District and Sessions Judge, 1st Grade. Retired from the Indian Civil Service in November 1911. Died in 1941.
Pulicat Ratanvelu Chetty	1875	1876		5th The first I.C.S from Madras Presidency.	Acting Assistant Collector of Palghaut. Died of "Gun Accident" on 28 September 1881 aged 25 years.
Maharajadhiraj Sir Rameshwar Singh Bahadur	1878	1885	1885 {appointed a Member of the Legislative Council of Bengal}		Magistrate and Collector of Darbhanga, Chhapra, and Bhagalpur.
Mancherji Pestonji Khareghat	1882	1884		26th	Judge and Sessions Judge, 2nd Grade of Ratnagiri. Retired from the Indian Civil Service on 1 September 1910.
Lokendranath Palit (Brother of Satyendranath Palit)	1884	1886		32nd	District and Sessions Judge, 3rd Grade of Bankura. Resigned from the Indian Civil Service on 16 May 1913.
Perungavur Rajagopalachari (later Diwan Bahadur and Sir)	1886	1888			Chairman of the Madras Legislative Council
Basanta Kumar Mullick	1887	1889			Puisne Judge of the Patna High Court
Atul Chunder Dutt (Nephew of Romesh Chunder Dutt)	1887	1889		38th	District and Sessions Judge of South Arcot. Died of "Pneumonia" on 28 June 1915 aged 45 years.
Satyendranath Palit (Brother of Lokendranath Palit)	1891	1893		28th	Assistant Magistrate and Collector of Purnea. Died in 1896.
Birendra Chandra Sen	1891	1893		31st	Commissioner, Bihar and Orissa. Retired from the Indian Civil Service on 17 November 1928.
Albion Rajkumar Banerjee (later Sir)	1894	1895			Prime Minister of Kashmir; Dewan of Mysore
Abdullah Yusuf Ali	1894	1896	Resigned in 1914	7th	Kanpur?
Atul Chandra Chatterjee (later Sir)	1896	1897			
Ghazanfur Ali Khan					

== 1900–1947 ==
Name	Year of examination	Year of joining	Year of resignation/ disqualification	Rank	Final posting
Sarat Kumar Ghosh (later Sir)	1903	1903			Chief Justice of Jaipur & of Kashmir
Gurusaday Dutt	1905	1905		First Indian to come first in any part of the Open Competitive Services examination; 1st (in the 2nd Part)	Secretary, Local Self Government and Public Health
Benegal Narsing Rau (later Sir)	1908	1909			Prime Minister of Kashmir
Benegal Rama Rau (later Sir)					Governor, Reserve Bank of India
Chandulal Madhavlal Trivedi (later Sir)					Governor of the Punjab
S. V. Ramamurthy (later Sir)	1911				Acting governor of Bombay
Chintaman Dwarakanath Deshmukh (later Sir, CIE)	1918			1st	1st Indian Governor of Reserve Bank of India; Finance Minister of India
Muhammad Saleh Akbar Hydari Jr. (later Sir)	1918	1919			Governor of Assam
Sukumar Sen	1919	1921			Chief Election Commissioner of India
Subhas Chandra Bose	1920	1921	1921(Resignation)	4th	
Y. N. Sukthankar (later CIE)		1921			Second Cabinet Secretary of India
Sudhansu Kumar Das		1921			Acting Chief Justice of the Supreme Court of India
K. P. S. Menon		1922		1st	First Foreign Secretary (India)
Nilakanta Mahadeva Iyer (later CIE)		1922			
Binay Ranjan Sen (later CIE)		1922			
N. R. Pillai (later Sir)		1923			First Cabinet Secretary of India
C. S. Venkatachari		1923			Chief Minister of Rajasthan
Girija Shankar Bajpai (later Sir)					Governor of Maharashtra
S. Venkateswaran	1925				
Annada Shankar Ray	1927				
Jaipal Singh Munda	1927	1927	1928 (resignation)		member Constituent Assembly
Birendra Narayan Chakraborty	1928				
Subimal Dutt	1928				Foreign Secretary (India)
Dharma Vira		1931			Governor of West Bengal
S. Bhoothalingam	1931			Finance Secretary of India	
Bhairab Dutt Pande	1938	1939			Governor of West Bengal
Lallan Prasad Singh	1935	1936			Governor of Assam
Lakshmi Kant Jha	1935	1936			Indian Ambassador to United States
Haribhai M. Patel					Defence Minister, Government of India
Abul Hasan Quraishi	1933	1933			
MS Randhawa		1934			Chief Commissioner of Chandigarh
Zafrul Ahsan Lari	1934	1934			
Maharaj Sri Nagendra Singh					President of the International Court of Justice, The Hague
Aditya Nath Jha	1935	1936			First Lieutenant Governor of Delhi
K.B. Lall					Secretary, Defence, GOI
Tarlok Singh		1937			Member of the Planning Commission of India
V. K. Rao	1937	1938			
Triloki Nath Kaul		1939			Ambassador, Foreign Secretary
Govind Narain		1939			Governor of Karnataka
H.V.R. Iyengar					Governor of the Reserve Bank of India
S. Jagannathan					Governor of the Reserve Bank of India
Chandrika Prasad Srivastava (later Sir)					Secretary General of International Maritime Organization, London
Sushil Chandra Mishra	1940				Collector of Satna and Tikamgarh, Chairman of M.P.E.B
M A Quraishi	1941				
Nirmal Kumar Mukarji	1941	1943		1st Rank from the Last Batch of ICS	Governor of Punjab, Last ICS officer in the Indian Government-8th Home Secretary 13th Cabinet Secretary of India
Bhagwan Singh (later Captain)		1946			Indian High Commissioner to Fiji
Chandra Shekhar Jha	1932	1932			
