= Iraqi Biradari =

Muslim community of Iraqi origin

Iraqi Birdari
Regions with significant populations
- India, Pakistan

Languages
- Urdu, Hindi, Bhojpuri, English

Religion
- Islam (Sunni)

Related ethnic groups
- Pathan, Pashtun

Iraqi Biradri is a Sunni Muslim caste found chiefly in Ghazipur, Azamgarh, Ballia, Deoria and Gorakhpur districts of the eastern Uttar Pradesh in India. Iraqi Biradri is also referred to as Iraqi Shaikh.

== History and origin ==
Iraqi Biradri is a descendant population of immigrants from Iraq. Recent facts argue that their ancestors were the immediate descendants of Sayyid Masud Al Hussaini and his poorly defined retinue, all recent immigrants from Iraq. Sayyid Masud Al Hussaini successfully extended the Ghazipur area under the Delhi Sultanate, settling with his family in the newly conquered city during the reign of Mamluk Sultan Firuz Shah Tughlaq circa 1330.

As a result, Iraqi Biradri are known have to settled in Ghazipur in the 14th century, with an origin roughly 700 years ago. The ancestors as old as 300 years or more are now very well-identified in many towns/villages of the districts as mentioned above including Ghazipur in the form of distinct family trees.

The above-mentioned Iraqi Biradri and a separate Muslim caste, the converted Kalals as Araquis, Rakis, or simply 'Kalal Iraqi' were characterized to be in one group in United Provinces (or U.P.) based on the work of British colonial civil administrators and others. These mistaken reports attributed a fallacy toward the Iraqi Biradri for more than a century in the past.

== Ethnic Iraqis ==
- India: Iraqi Biradri from the native places in eastern U.P. are settled in many cities among others,Ethnic communities in Kanpur, and Ethnic communities in Kolkata are noticeable. For the last few centuries, Lar town in Deoria or prior to 1958 Gorakhpur district has continued a predominant population of historic Iraqis.
- Pakistan: After independence in 1947, many Iraqi Families migrated mainly to Karachi Pakistan, names of the most migrants with details of the places of origin in eastern Uttar Pradesh are recorded.

== Genetics ==
A variety of Y-DNA haplogroups are found among certain random samples that represent distinct Iraqi families as outlined above. The Y-DNA haplogroups included: M198(R1a1a), branches R-Y6 >R-Y1, R-Y7 and R-Y37/M560 >R-M12232; Y-DNA haplogroup J2-M172, branches J2a and J2b; Y-DNA Haplogroup J1 (J-CTS5368); Y-DNA haplogroup L, L-M27. Maternal haplogroups found are: U- U2, U4a, U7; M- M3c, M5a, M30, M33; R- R0, R30b, R2 and R8; W- W3a; H- H11a2; A- A4b (YSEQ, 23andme and FamilyTreeDNA).

== Notable people ==
- Lari Azad, Indian historian and writer
- Nasreen Jalil, Pakistani senator and daughter of Zafarul Ahsan Lari, ICS
- Ahmar Lari, Urdu Poet and scholar
- Ghazala Lari, Indian politician, Uttar Pradesh legislative assembly member (2008-2017)
- Mushir-Riaz, Indian businessmen (film producers)
- Maqbool Ahmed Lari, Indian businessman, philanthropist, recipient of the Padma Shri (1971)
- Marghoob Ahmad Lari, Indian politician
- Murad Lari, politician from Uttar Pradesh
- Muzaffar Ahmad Lari, Urdu writer
- Suhail Zaheer Lari, historian and writer in Pakistan
- Yasmeen Lari, the first female architect in Pakistan
- Zahirul Hasnain Lari, known leader of All India Muslim League from United Provinces
- Abdul Ghaffar Mauwi, Deobandi Islamic scholar
- Noor Mohammad, popular as Noori Mian, founder of Bhatni sugar mill
- Muhibbullah Lari Nadwi, Islamic scholar
- Abul Hasan Quraishi, ICS, origin Rasra, Ballia
- Manzoor Alam Quraishi, Indian Civil Service officer, 1941 batch
