= Ethnic communities in Kolkata =

Communities in an Indian city

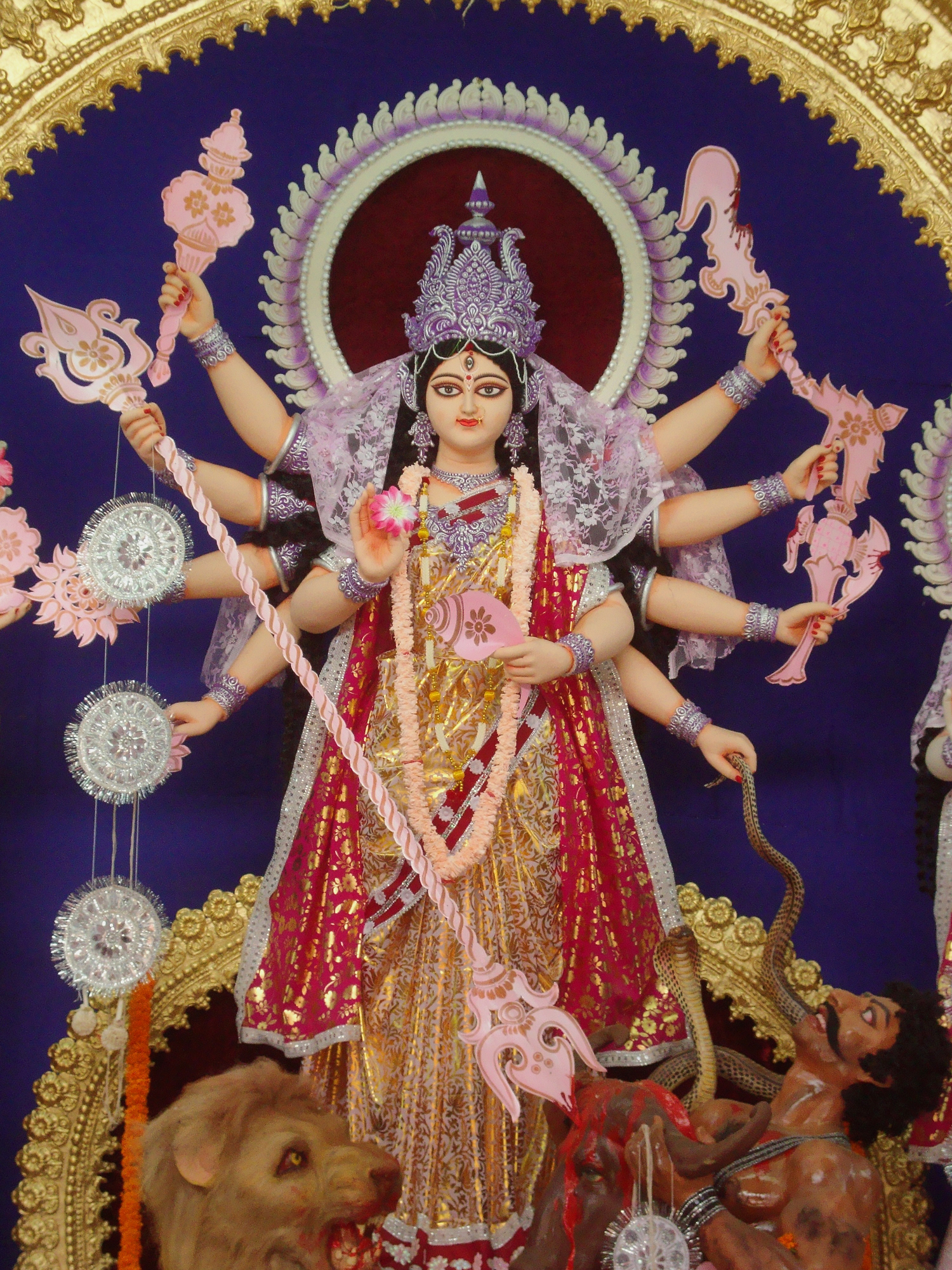
A depiction of Durga (the Hindu goddess of power and destroyer of evil) at Durga temple, Burdwan, West Bengal

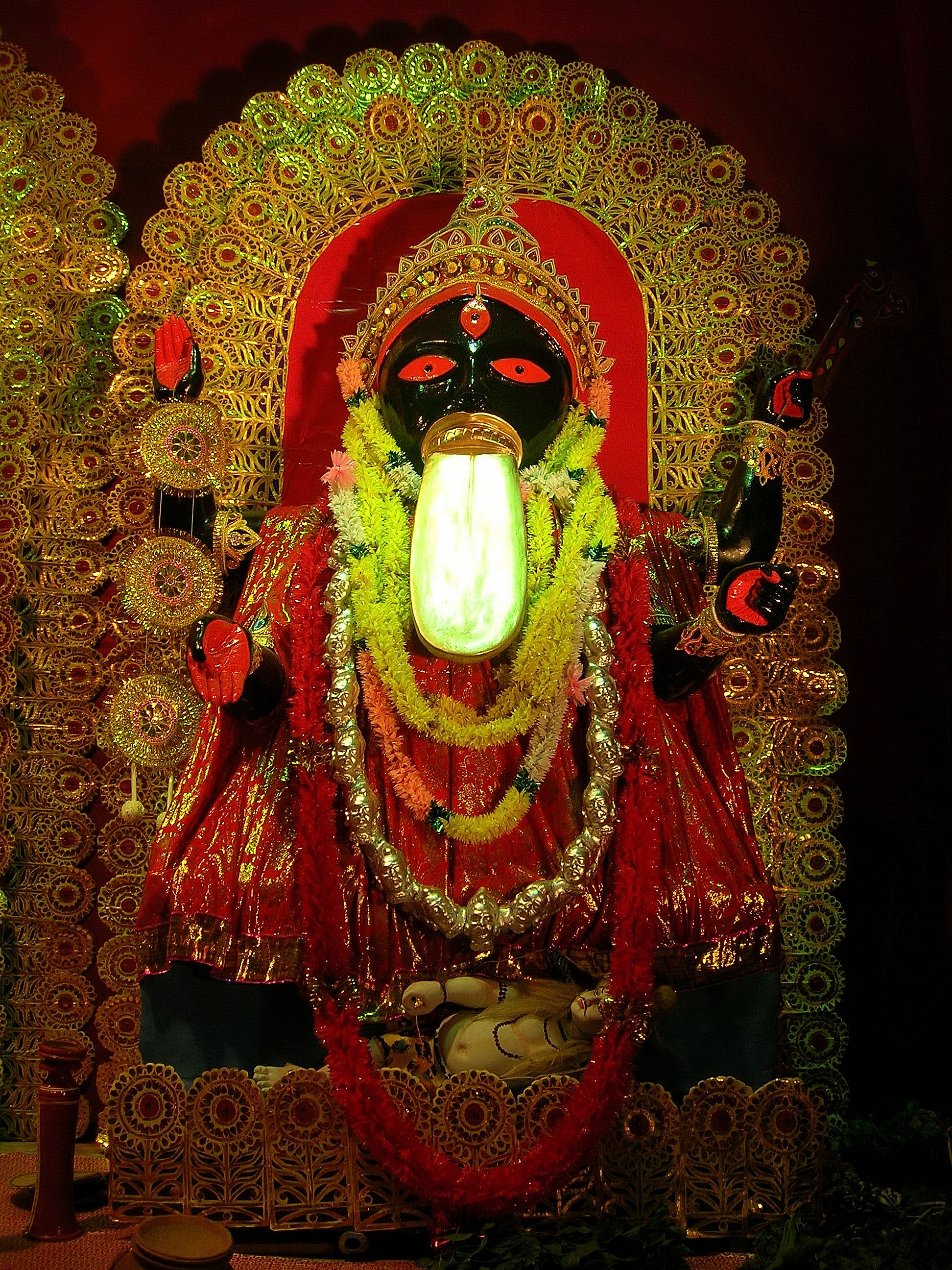
A Kali Puja pandal with a replica of the Kalighat Kali Temple icon.

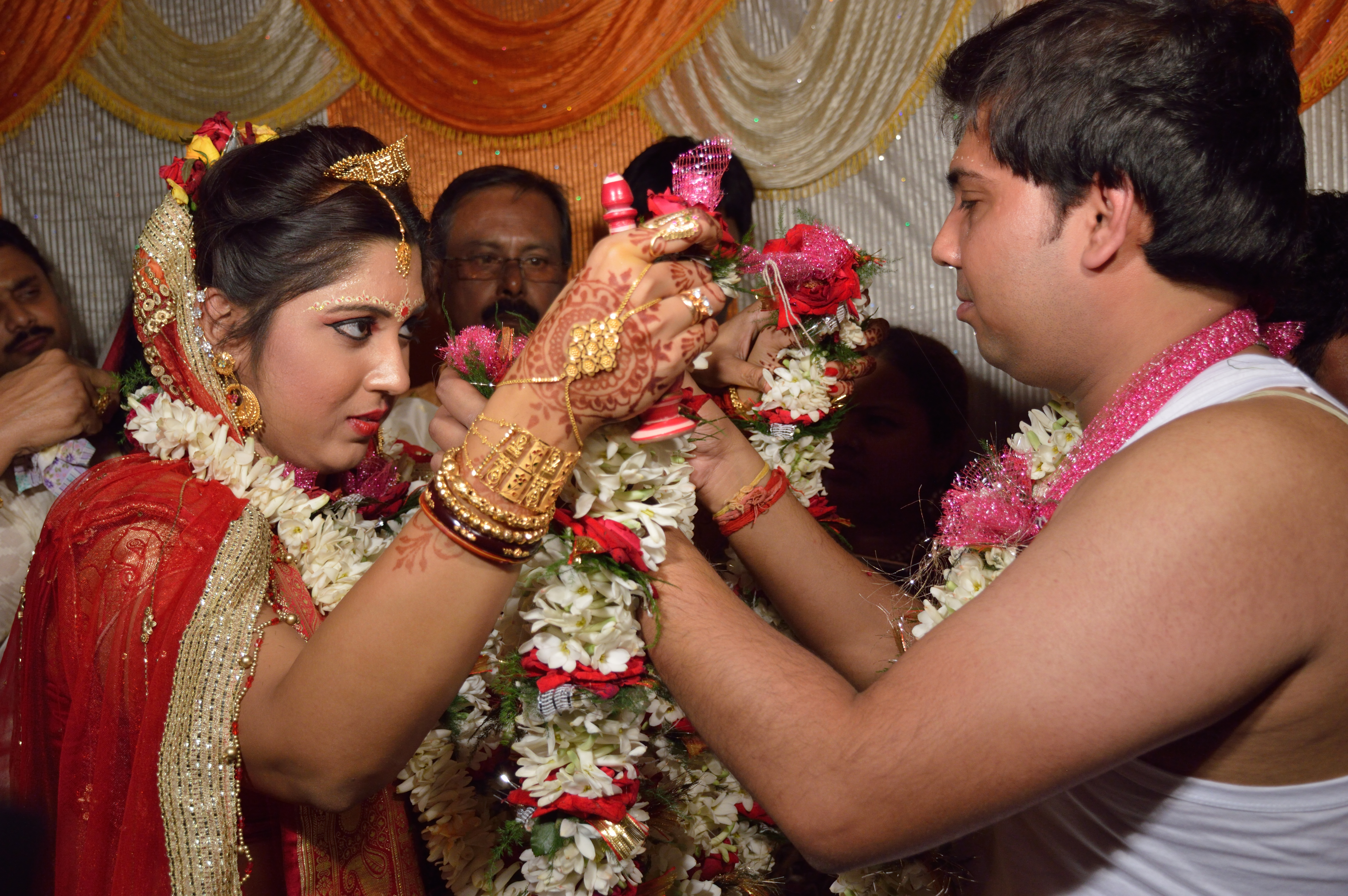
A Bengali Hindu wedding in Kolkata, West Bengal

Languages spoken in Kolkata city (2011 census)
1. Bengali (61.5%)
2. Hindi (23.0%)
3. Urdu (13.0%)
4. Odia (0.58%)
5. Gujarati (0.57%)
6. Punjabi (0.35%)
7. English (0.20%)
8. Nepali (0.18%)
9. Tamil (0.14%)
10. Telugu (0.12%)
11. Malayalam (0.10%)
12. Others (0.44%)

Kolkata, India, is largely inhabited by the ethnic community of the native Bengalis (both Ghoti and Bangal origin) respectively. According to a report by the Indian Statistical Institute owned by the Government of India, the Kolkata city had a population of 4.5 million as of 2011 out of which the population of native Bengalis in Kolkata is almost 62% which comprised the majority of the city's population, whereas ethnic groups like Marwaris, Biharis and Urdu-speaking Muslims together forming 36% of the population which comes under the category of large minorities. Other Various micro-minority communities of Kolkata include as far as concerned follows -: Pathans, Marathis, Odias, Gujaratis, Sindhis, Kashmiris, Punjabis, Nepalis, Telugus, Tamils, Anglo-Indians, Arabs, Jews, Armenians, Tibetans, Greeks, Parsis, Chinese, and Iraqis etc.

Kolkata city linguistic diversity as per (2011 census)
Languages	Population
Bengali	2,763,291
Hindi	1,034,363
Urdu	586,234
Odia	26,158
Gujarati	25,667
Punjabi	15,913
Arabs	10,000
English	8,932
Nepali	8,089
Tamil	6,508
Telugu	5,330
Malayalam	4,434
Sindhi	3,724
Others	28,607
Total	4,496,694

== Chinese ==
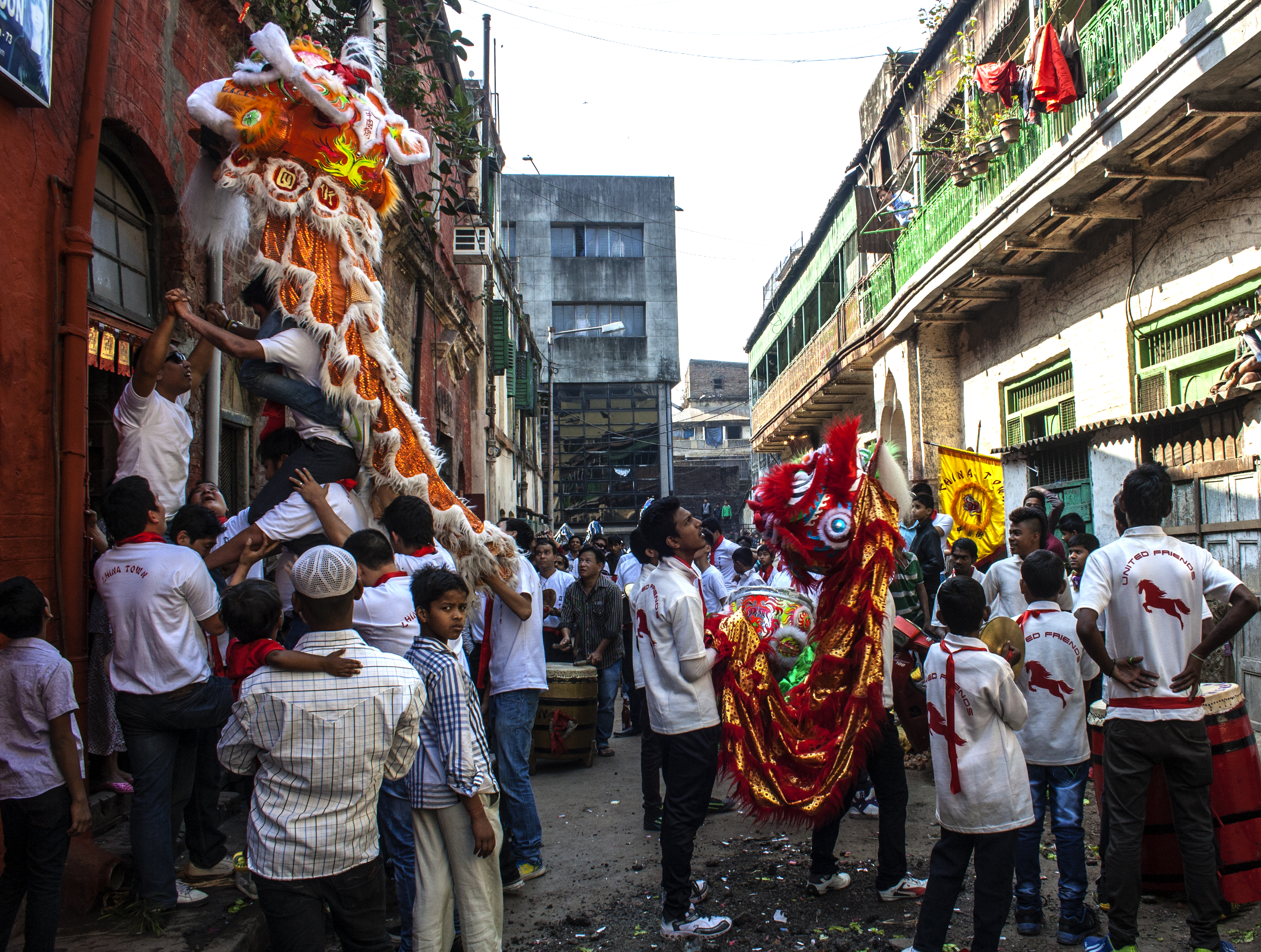
Chinese New Year 2014 Celebration in Kolkata

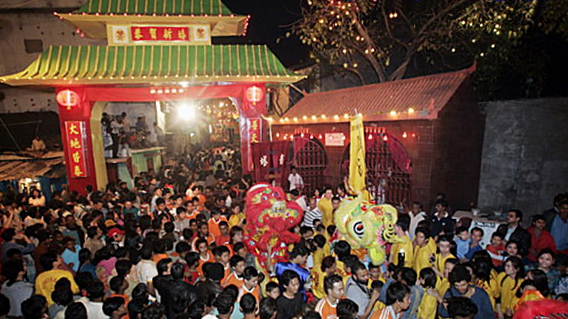
The Chinese New Year celebrated in Chinatown

Chinatown (Bengali: চায়নাটাউন, কলকাতা) in the eastern part of the city of Kolkata is the only Chinatown in India. Once home to 20,000 ethnic Chinese, its population dropped to below 2,000 as of 2009 as a result of multiple factors including repatriation following India's independence, followed by expulsion, internment and denial of Indian citizenship following the 1962 Sino-Indian War, and emigration to foreign countries for better economic opportunities. The Chinese community traditionally worked in the local tanning industry and ran Chinese restaurants.

== Iraqi ==
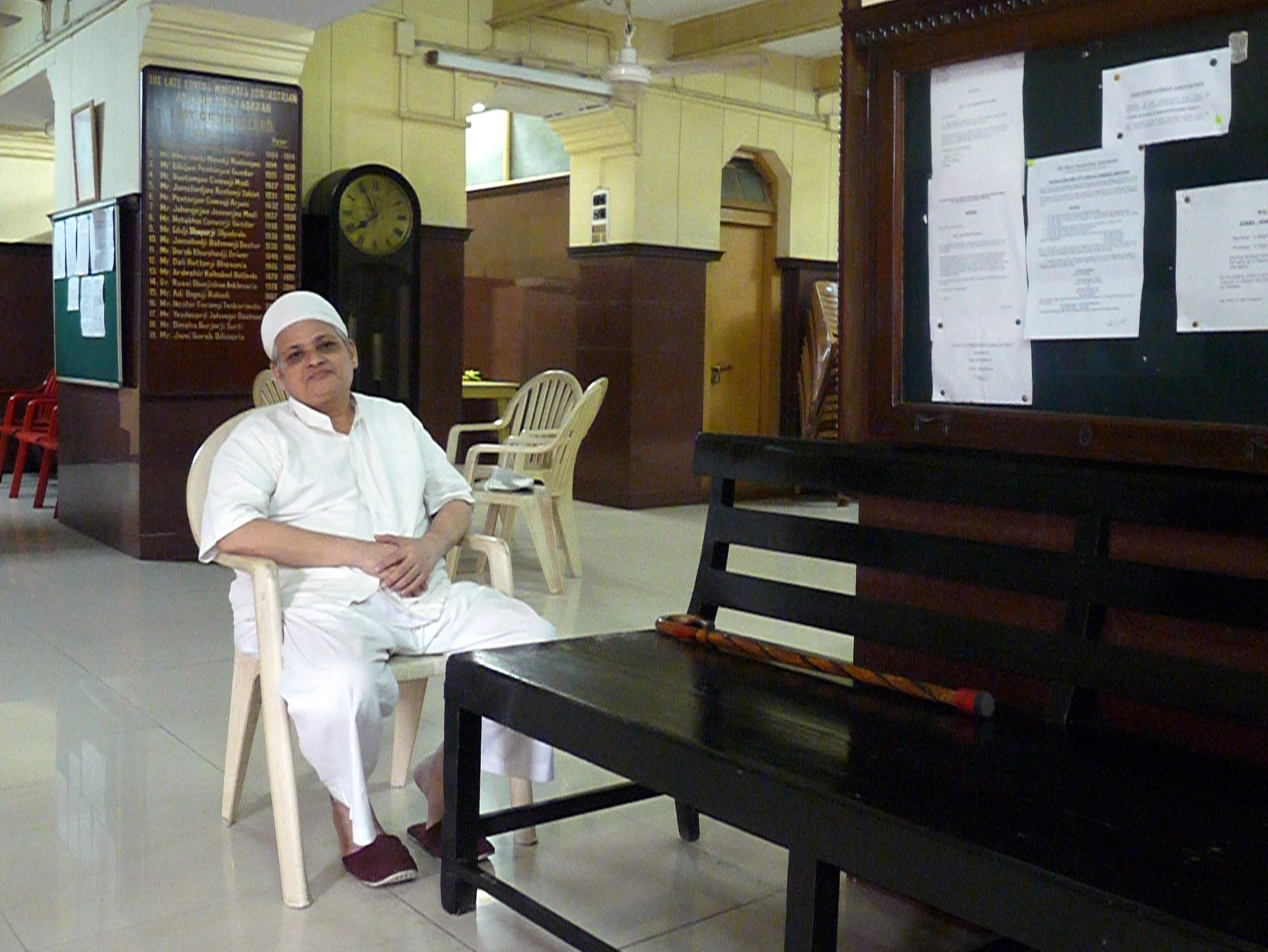
A Parsi gentleman in Kolkata

Iraqi biradri is a community of Sunni Muslims from eastern Uttar Pradesh where the community has a historic Iraqi origin, believed to have come to Ghazipur, India, in the 14th century from Iraq. Some members moved to the city earlier in the colonial times. As time progressed they have settled in Park Circus and Topsia area of the city where leather tanneries were concentrated. Most of the community members speak Urdu, and Bhojpuri and maintain a strong affiliation with their eastern UP roots with many still having ancestral houses in the Bhojpuri belt of UP. About 80% of the tanneries in the Kolkata Leather Complex are owned by members of the Iraqi Biradri who are possibly responsible provide employment to over 100,000 people. Most of them still live in the areas of Park Circus and Topsia. The present Iraqi population in Kolkata is estimated to be 20,000.

== Jewish ==
Kolkata's Jews are mostly Baghdadi Jews who came to Kolkata to trade. At one point as strong as 6000, the community has dwindled to about 60 after the formation of Israel. Today there are only about 30 Jews left in Kolkata. The first recorded Jewish immigrant to Kolkata was Shalon Cohen in 1798 from Aleppo in present-day Syria. The most influential Jewish family in Kolkata was perhaps the father-son real estate magnates David Joseph Ezra and Elia David Ezra. They were behind such buildings as the Chowringhee Mansions, Esplanade Mansions and the synagogue Neveh Shalom. The family also were instrumental in the founding of the Jewish Girls School. Ezra Street in Kolkata is named after them. The community has five independent synagogues in Kolkata, including one in Chinatown, some of which are still active today. The Jewish confectioner Nahoum's in the New Market holds a special place in Kolkata confectionery. Founded in 1902, Nahoum's moved to its present location in the New Market in 1916. It is run today by the original owner's grandson, David Nahoum. A Jewish wedding in Kolkata after a gap of 50 years in the 1990s received a lot of media attention. After the establishment of Israel, many Kolkatan Jews left to live in Israel and the size of the Jewish community had a severe decrease.

== Armenian ==
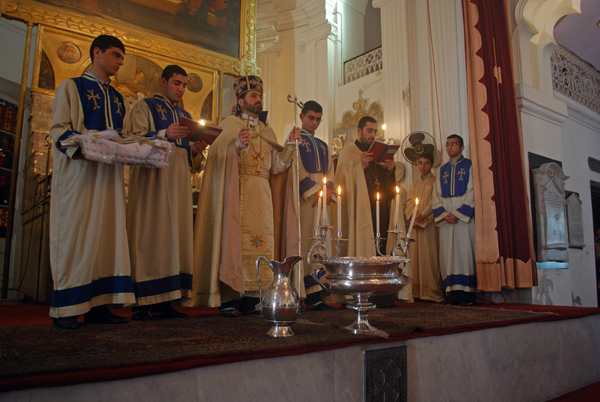
Armenian Christmas

The Armenians followed the land route through Bactria to trade with India from ancient times. They were known as the "Merchant Princes of India", and some settled in Emperor Akbar's court. Some finally settled in Serampore and Kolkata, supposedly under the invitation of Job Charnock.

Among notable Armenians, Sir Apcar Alexander Apcar, a prominent businessman, was the head of the Bengal Chamber of Commerce and Industry. The size of the Armenian community can be testified by the five Armenian cemeteries in Kolkata, including the one adjunct to the Chapel of Holy Trinity in Tangra and an Armenian church. A gift of Rs. 8000 by Asvatoor Mooradkhan helped found the Armenian College in 1821. Armenian College has been instrumental in pioneering the game of rugby on the Maidan turf.

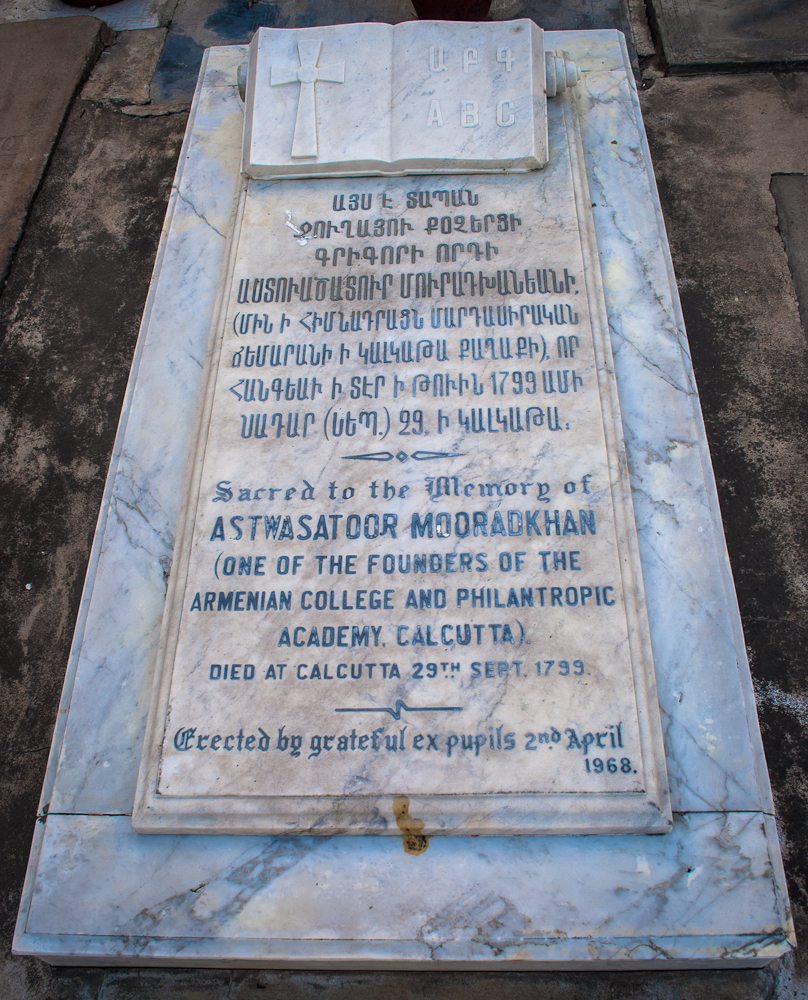
The grave of Astwasatoor Mooradkhan

The Armenians settled in a block close to Free School Street, which even to this day is called Armani-para ("the neighbourhood of the Armenians"). They have mostly assimilated into the Indian population, and the community has now been reduced to a handful of houses.

== Tibetan ==
The Tibetans were initially annual winter visitors to Kolkata who, along with the Bhutias, vended woollens. Post 1951, Kolkata became home to quite a few Tibetans who used the porous Sikkim-Tibet border to get to Kolkata. Winter sees large numbers of Tibetans set up winter garment streetside shops in the area around Wellington Square. The Tibetan community has also contributed to a large number of Tibetan restaurants serving ethnic Tibetan cuisine. Tibetan medicine is well accepted in Kolkata as alternative therapy to terminal illnesses.

== Afghans ==
Kolkata was a popular destination for Afghan (including Pathan) businessmen from Afghanistan in the 19th century, vending spices and fruits. They are locally known as the Kabuliwala, named after the 1892 story which tells the story of a migrant from Kabul to Kolkata, and are also nicknamed as the Khans like elsewhere in India.

== Greek ==
The Greeks emigrated to India after the Ottoman and Turkish invasions in the 16th century. By the 18th century, Kolkata had a sizeable Greek community, mostly a close-knit clan of noble families from the Greek regions of Chios and Thessaly, pursuing trade with the British. The firm of Ralli Brothers is perhaps the most common Greek name in Kolkata; the Rallis sold their firm in the 1960s after Indian independence and moved away. The firm is now known as Ralli India, under the Tata Group of companies. The Greek community is centred on Amratollah Street around the Greek Church of the Transfiguration (built in 1782). There are currently around 2,500 to 5,000 Greeks in Kolkata. The most famous Greek to hail from Kolkata possibly was the gifted violinist Marie Nicachi who embarked on a European tour in 1910 and played at the courts of Emperor Franz Josef of Austria and Tsar Nicholas II of Russia. She settled in her familial home of Corfu after World War I. The Greek contribution to the city will be remembered by the pioneering social work at the Greek Orthodox Church and the Panioty Fountain in the Maidan; named after Demetrius Panioty, personal secretary to the "friend of India," Lord Ripon. There is the Greek Cemetery, Kolkata situated at Abul Kalam Azad Sarani.

== See also ==
- Chinese of Calcutta
- Religion in West Bengal
