= Zahirul Hasnain Lari =

Pakistani politician (1907 – 1972)

Zahirul Hasnain Lari Member of the Constituent Assembly of India

Personal details
- Born: 17 January 1907 Lar, United Provinces (present-day Uttar Pradesh, India)
- Died: 13 March 1972 (aged 65)
- Profession: Lawyer; Politician

Zahirul Hasnain Lari (17 January 1907 – 13 March 1972) was a lawyer and a known Muslim League leader from United Provinces. He was a Pakistan movement activist and some acts of nationalism in his student life in India are noted.

== Early life ==
Zahirul Hasnain Lari was born in Lar, Uttar Pradesh India on 17 January 1907. He was born to parents (Father Abdus Shakoor) who belonged to the historic local Muslim community Iraqi Biradari. He was educated at Aligarh Muslim University Aligarh, receiving respectively, a B.A. (1927) degree, M.A., LL.B. (1930) degree and he was a notable alumnus. After graduation in Law, Zahirul Hasnain practiced as a lawyer at Gorakhpur district court. He enrolled as an Advocate in the High Court Allahabad where his family lived before migration to Pakistan in 1950.

== Political life ==
1937 Indian provincial elections under Government of India Act 1935: Muslim League President Muhammad Ali Jinnah took a nationalist stance and emulated the Congress electoral campaign and appointed Muslim League Parliamentary Boards for the 1937 elections. The strategy mentioned above did not work as the Muslim League barely won 29 seats from the Muslim-reserved 66 seats or 29 in total U.P. assembly seats 288. On the other hand, the Congress Party won a simple majority of 138 to form the government. Zahirul Hasnain won the 1937 U.P. Legislative Assembly election from Gorakhpur reserved seat. As an important Muslim League leader from United Province he served the deputy leader of the opposition post in U.P. Legislative Assembly.

1946 Indian provincial elections: Zahirul Hasnain was re-elected to the U.P. Assembly in 1946 and became Deputy Leader of the Opposition (1946-1948). It is noteworthy that the 1946 election was fought with a different strategy under Zahirul Hasnain as a member of the parliamentary board of the Muslim League. The result of this election was astonishing (e.g. United Provinces ||66||54||82%). In general, the Muslim League with the new strategy won the most seats from Muslim reserved seats in every province including Muslim-majority provinces, Punjab, and Bengal. Therefore, the 1946 election would effectively form a referendum if the Indian Muslims were to vote on the creation of Pakistan. In this connection, it was noted that Z.H. Lari, deputy leader of the opposition, intervened in the United Province assembly on the unity issue.

Constituent Assembly of India: The British government planned an early election in provinces in 1946. It was planned that these provincial assemblies then elect a new Constituent Assembly before the independence of India. Zahirul Hasnain Lari was appointed to the Constituent Assembly from the United Provinces on a Muslim League ticket. He made important interventions in the debates on cultural, educational rights of minorities, the right to life and liberty, and equal opportunity. The example of some of the interventions mentioned above is referred to here.

== Migration ==
Zahirul Hasnain Lari resigned from the Assembly in 1949. In May 1950, Lari migrated to Pakistan. He was appointed as the additional judge of the Sindh Chief Court till December 1952. Later, he resigned from this post to join the Karachi bar.

== Death ==
Zahirul Hasnain Lari died on 13 March 1972 in Karachi.

== See also ==
- Nasreen Jalil, Pakistani senator
- Yasmeen Lari, the first female architect in Pakistan
