= McDonnell Drinking Fountain =

Memorial fountain in Calcutta, India

McDonell Drinking Fountain
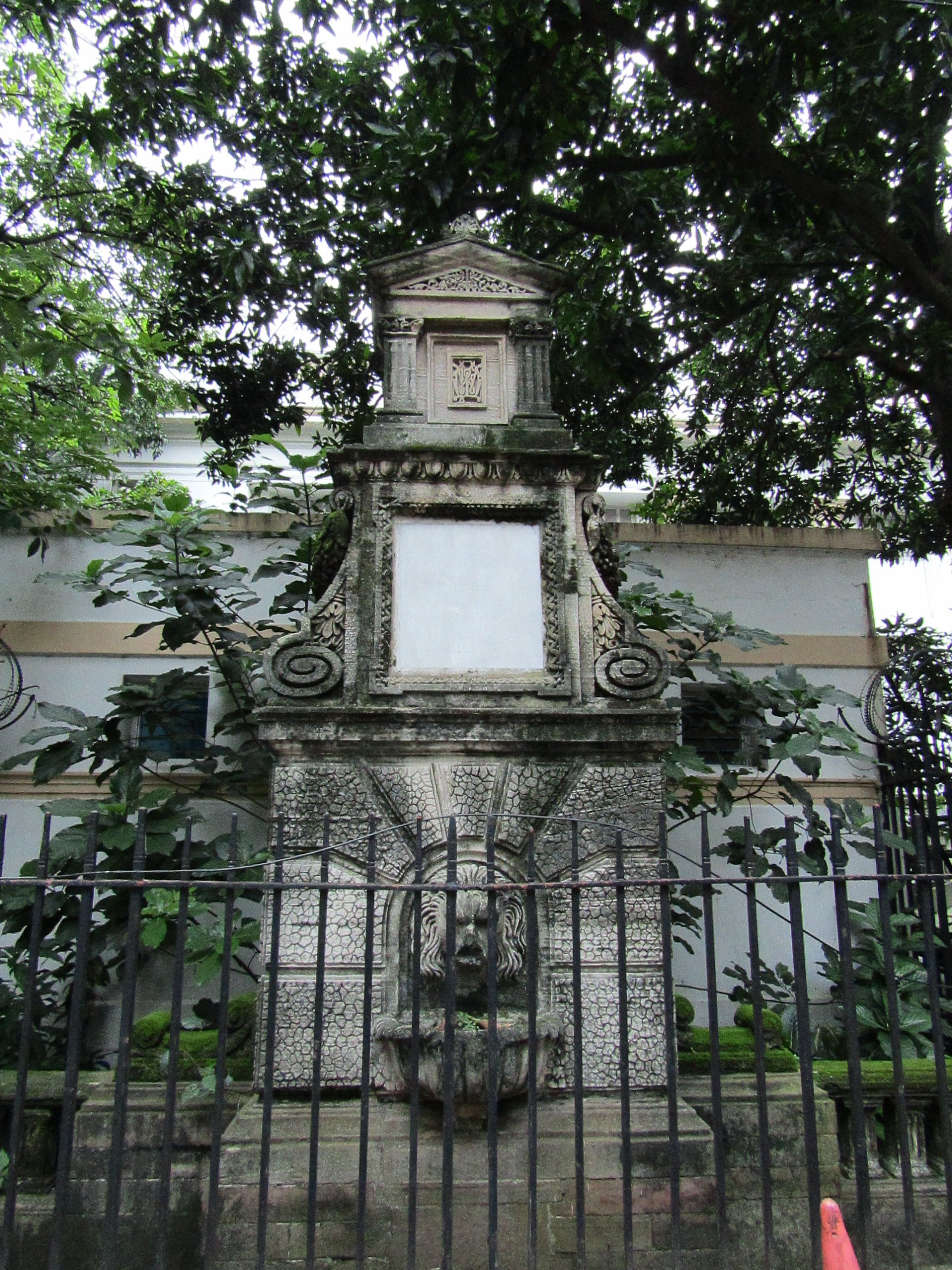
- McDonell Fountain in Calcutta
- Location: Esplanade Row West, Calcutta, West Bengal, India
- Type: Memorial drinking-water fountain
- Material: Marble
- Completion date: 1894
- Opening date: 1894
- Dedicated to: William Fraser McDonell
- Heritage status: Grade I Heritage Structure

McDonnell Drinking Fountain is a memorial drinking-water fountain at Esplanade Row West in Calcutta, West Bengal, India. Built in 1894, it was constructed in memory of William Fraser McDonnell, a British civil servant who served in India. The fountain was intended to provide free drinking water to the public. It's a significant example of ornamental public fountains that were installed in the late colonial Calcutta.

Designed in the Victorian Gothic Revival style, the fountain is well known for its carved marble ornamentation and decorative canopy. The monument bears commemorative inscriptions in honour of William Fraser McDonnell. It's no longer functional as a public drinking fountain and has deteriorated from years of weathering and inadequate maintenance. It has been listed as a Grade I heritage structure by the KMC.

== Backdrop ==
William Fraser McDonell joined the Indian Civil Service in 1850 and served until his retirement in 1886. After joining the service, he was appointed as the Assistant Magistrate of the Saran district in the Bihar Province of colonial India. In 1855, he was promoted to the Magistrate in the same office.

For showing extraordinary courage and bravery during an episode in Arrah, Bihar Province, during the Sepoy Mutiny of 1857, McDonnell was honoured with the Victoria Cross in 1860. In its 167-year history, only seven civilians have been awarded the Victoria Cross, and McDonnell was the second. His medal is on display at the Lord Ashcroft Gallery in the Imperial War Museum in London.

After he was awarded the Victoria Cross in 1860, McDonnell was shifted to the Nadia district in the Bengal Presidency as a Magistrate. Within a few years, he was promoted to a judge at the Patna High Court. After that, he was appointed as a judge at the Calcutta High Court in 1874. He served there till his retirement in 1886.

== History ==
The McDonnell Drinking Fountain was erected in 1894 as a tribute to William Fraser McDonnell, to commemorate his Victoria Cross achievement and his service as a distinguished member of the Indian Civil Service. Since he served his final years before retirement at the Calcutta High Court, this monument was constructed opposite the Kolkata Town Hall, about 100 meters from the main entrance of the Calcutta High Court. Owing to McDonnell's association as a steward with the Calcutta Turf Club, which was one of the then–premier horse racing clubs in the Indian subcontinent, a manger was placed at the base of this drinking water memorial fountain for the horses. The horses of the horse carts, who used to carry judges, lawyers, and litigants throughout the day, used to drink water here.

== Architecture ==
Façade of the McDonnell Fountain, showing the Victorian Neo-Gothic Revival ornamentation and the once inscription bearing white marble commemorative plaque

The McDonnell Drinking Fountain has been constructed in the Victorian Gothic revivalist style. The fountain is arranged in a vertically tiered composition. When it was active, the water came out from a gargoyle lion-head spout. The water passed through a bronze pipe on the before coming out through the lionhead spout. On the outside, the water flowed into a marble basin, from where it overflowed into a trough for horses. The trough, placed at a little distance from the base of the fountain, was made of brass.

The gargoyle lion-head spout located at the façade is characteristic of Victorian Gothic architecture. There are floral reliefs on the lateral projections. The monument also incorporates moldings on its lateral side. The upper part of the façade is surmounted by a small pedimented canopy supported on two slender columns. The zenith of the fountain has an urn-shaped floral capital. There are numerous floral designs surrounding it.

== Inscriptions ==
For The Statesman in 1966, Desmond Doig did a series of illustrations of Calcutta's historical monuments and landmarks. For the McDonnell Drinking Fountain, he wrote, "Only dismantling the fountain completely could have done more to hide it from view." The inscription written on the fountain's white marble plaque has faded over time. It spoke of the "manly rectitude and kindly disposition" that was displayed by McDonnell during his consolidated efforts to reclaim the strategic outpost of Arrah from the sepoys during the Sepoy Mutiny of 1857. There are two inscriptions on two sides of the fountain—one engraved in 1850 and another in 1886. This is unique since most memorials mention the year of birth and death of the person to whom the memorial is dedicated, but this marked his period of service as a civil servant in the Bengal Presidency (1850-1886).

== Ignominy and decline ==
Presently, the fountain has turned black in many parts owing to the years of weathering and lack of adequate maintenance. Major portions of its intricate architecture have withered and broken down. A public toilet behind its back and a parking lot in front it shield it most of the time from the view of the passer-bys. Local residents, oblivious of the fountain's historical significance, use the railing around the fountain to dry their washed clothes.

The trough provided for the horses was in poor condition during the 1960s, but it vanished after that, and no one knows anything regarding it. The nose of the lionhead spout has broken. The fountain has also developed cracks in multiple places. McDonnell's achievements, which were engrained on the white marble plaque on the façade of the fountain, have also faded.

=== Restoration efforts ===
Presently, the fountain is out of service. The Calcutta department of the Indian National Trust for Art and Cultural Heritage made a proposal to the Kolkata Municipal Corporation for the restoration of the fountain. But to date, they haven't received permission from the authorities to carry one with their work. In an official statement, they stated that after assessing the repairing costs, they concluded that around ₹23 lakhs will be required to restore the fountain properly.

== Nearby historical landmarks ==
Esplanade has a rich history of colonial–era and post–independence landmarks. Historical landmarks in and around the McDonnell Drinking Fountain include the Calcutta High Court, Kolkata Town Hall, Writers' Buildings, West Bengal Legislative Assembly, Governor's House, Panioty Fountain and Dalhousie Square.
