= Maqbool Ahmed Lari =

Indian businessperson (1916–2004)

- Born: May 1916; Lar in Deoria district, Uttar Pradesh, India
- Died: 17 May 2004 (aged 87–88); Lucknow, Uttar Pradesh, India
- Occupations: Businessman, philanthropist, Writer
- Known for: Urdu literature
- Awards: Padma Shri; Royal Gorkha award

Maqbool Ahmed Lari (1916 – 2004) was an Indian businessperson, philanthropist, Urdu writer, and the founder of All India Mir Academy in Lucknow, Uttar Pradesh, India.

== Early life ==
Lari was born in May 1916 at Lar, Deoria district in the Indian state of Uttar Pradesh in a clan of Iraqi Biradari. After he graduated (B.A. degree) from Allahabad University, he migrated to Nepal in 1942 as an entrepreneur where he stayed for 10 years. He returned, living with his family at "Lari House" near City Station in Lucknow, U.P. India from 1953.

== Honors and achievements ==
In Nepal, Lari as an Indian businessman worked with others to improve trade and education. For his services he was honoured with a title, Royal Gurkha, by the Government of Nepal; he was selected as a member of the senate of Tribhuvan University, Kathmandu for 10 years.

He took a personal interest in all the activities of the Urdu Rabita Committee of U.P. and Uttar Pradesh Urdu Academy established by the Ministry of Minority Affairs, Uttar Pradesh Government in 1972. In other words, as an advisor/ or a member within the aforementioned organizations together with his generous financial support, he helped strengthen the status of the Urdu language and child education at the level of schools in Uttar Pradesh.

It is believed that the marker of the burial place of Mir Taqi Mir in Lucknow was lost when railway tracks were built over his grave. For the above reasons, a cenotaph was built in the vicinity of his actual burial place in the 1970s, due to his efforts as the founder of Mir Academy. He played a big role in the publication of Hadeed-e-Meer, a collection of poems of Mir Taqi Mir, the renowned Urdu poet.

It is noted that he provided a major financial contribution toward the establishment of Lari Cardiology Centre at King George's Medical University in Lucknow. As a result, the aforementioned centre was founded in 1977 by the renowned cardiologist, Mansoor Hasan. In 1971 the Government of India honoured him with Padma Shri, the fourth highest Indian civilian award for his services in the field of literature and education.

== Death and legacy ==
Lari died on 17 May 2004 in Lucknow at the age of 88. At his death he was survived by his son and two daughters.

== See also ==
- Mir Taqi Mir, founder of Urdu poetry of the 18th century Mughal India
- Mansoor Hasan, known Indian cardiologist
