= B. Vijayabharathi =

Indian author

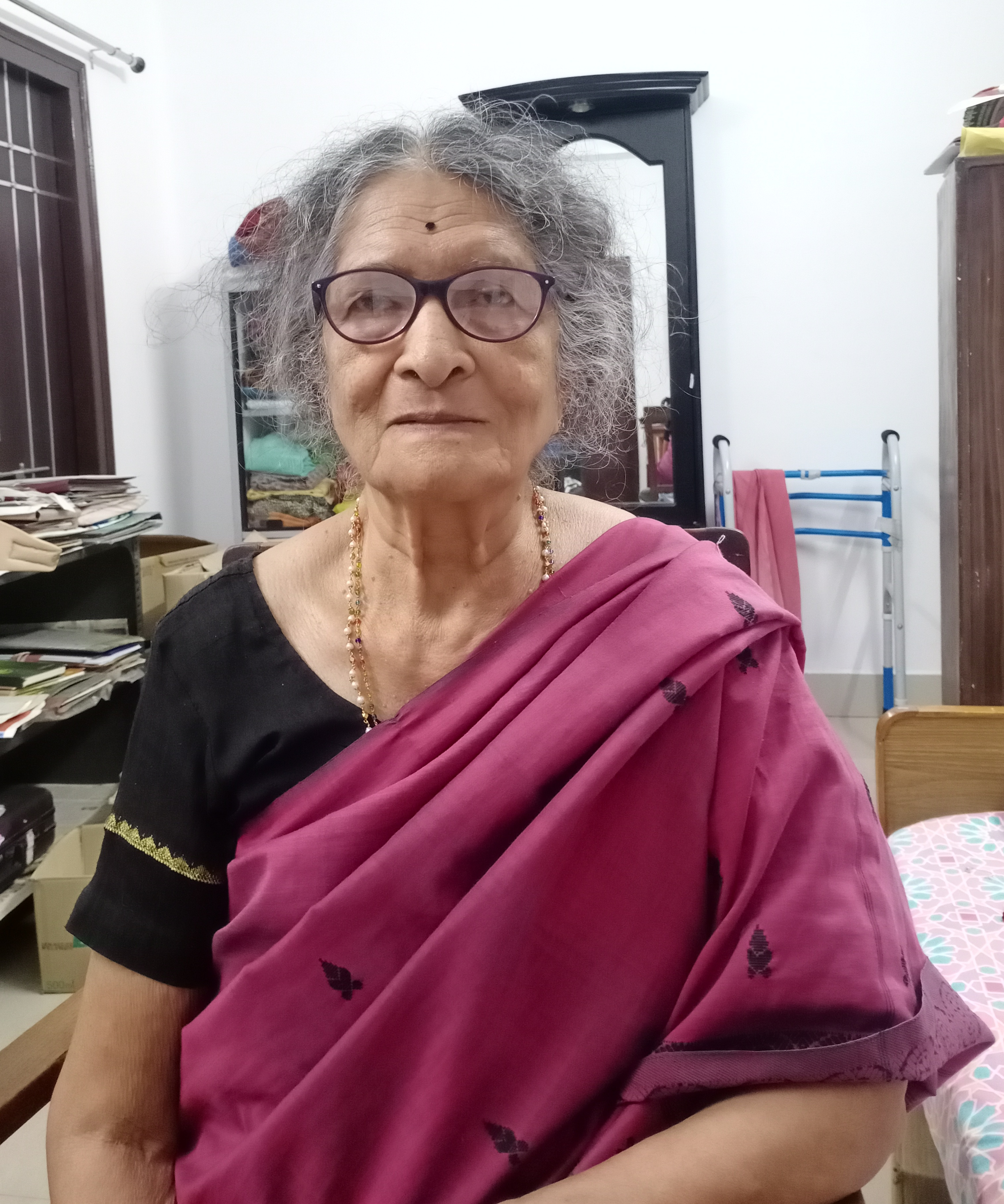
- Born: 1941; Rajavolu, East Godavari district, India
- Died: September 28, 2024 (aged 82–83); Sanatnagar, Hyderabad
- Other names: Dr. Vijaya Bharathi, B. Vijaya Bharathi
- Occupation: Author

B. Vijayabharathi was a female Indian Dalit author, women's rights activist and former deputy director of Telugu Academy.

== Biography ==
Vijayabharathi was born in Rajolu, East Godavari in 1941. She did her postgraduate education at Osmania University (OU), and was awarded a Phd in both Literature and Telugu literature there, making her the first Dalit woman to be awarded a literature phd at OU. She was the deputy director of Telugu Academy. During her career, she published over twenty Telugu books, including both the Prachina Sahitya Kosham (Encyclopedia of Ancient Literature) and Adhunika Sahitya Kosham (Encyclopedia of Modern Literature). She was married sociologist Bojja Tharakam in the 1960s.

She died from illness in Sanatnagar, Hyderabad on 28 September 2024 at the age of 83. After her death, CM Revanth Reddy paid tribute to her legacy, sending his "deepest condolences" to her family.
