= Valluri =

Valluri (Telugu: వల్లూరి) is a Telugu surname. Notable people with the surname include:

- Valluri Balakrishna (born 1925), Indian comedian
- Valluri Kameswara Rao (1914–2018), Indian civil servant
- Valluri Sreenivasa Rao (born 1981), Indian weightlifter
- Valluri Shashikanth (born 2005), Engineer & entrepreneur
