= William Broome (civil servant) =

British-Indian civil servant and judge

- Born: 1910; London, England
- Died: 1988 (aged 77–78); Bangalore, India
- Citizenship: United Kingdom (1910–1958); India (1958–1988)
- Occupation: Judge

William George Broome (18 March 1910 – 1988) was a British-Indian civil servant and judge. He was an Indian Civil Service officer of the 1932 batch. He had the distinction of being the last British-born judge to serve in India.

== Education ==
He was educated at Latymer Upper School, Hammersmith. He continued his further studies at Gonville and Caius College, Cambridge. He joined the Indian Civil Service on 10 October 1932.

== Life ==
Justice William Broome (ICS 1932), a district and sessions judge at the time of Independence in 1947, remained in Indian government service as a judge. Having married an Indian, Swarup Kumari Gaur (the daughter of Hari Singh Gour), in 1937, with whom he raised a family, he eventually renounced his British citizenship in 1958 and became an Indian citizen with the personal intervention of Prime Minister Jawaharlal Nehru, himself a former barrister who regarded Broome as a distinguished jurist and as "much an Indian as anybody can be who is not born in India". Upon his retirement on 18 March 1972 from the Allahabad High Court as its seniormost puisne judge, Broome was the last former ICS officer of European origin serving in India.

He died in Bangalore in 1988.

=== Family ===
He had a son Ashok Broome and three daughters- Maya Nair, Lakshmi Seth and Indira Chaudhary .

== Career ==
He served in Uttar Pradesh as Assistant Magistrate and Collector. He then became District and Session Judge on 16.4.1941. He was also appointed as Registrar of Allahabad High Court in December, 1943. He was confirmed as District and Sessions Judge on 13 September 1945.

He heard the early hearings of the landmark Indian court case, State of Uttar Pradesh v. Raj Narain.

=== Allahabad High Court ===
He was appointed Additional Judge of Allahabad High Court on 8 December 1958. He was then made the permanent Judge of Allahabad High Court on 18 February 1959.
