= Manzoor Alam Quraishi =

Indian civil service

Manzoor Alam Quraishi Indian Civil Service officer

Personal details
- Born: 24 July 1917 Ballia, Uttar Pradesh
- Died: 13 February 2000 (aged 82)
- Profession: civil service

Manzoor Alam Quraishi or M. A Quraishi (born 24 July 1917) was a member of the Indian Civil Service of Uttar Pradesh Cadre by passing the relevant examination in 1941 soon after the enactment of Government of India Act 1935. His decision to serve the government of India made his career distinguishable as he was one of the few Muslim ICS members who opted for India as opposed to Pakistan at the Partition of India 1947.

== Early life ==
Manzoor Alam Quraishi was born on 24 July 1917 in Rasra Ballia Uttar Pradesh, India. He was born to parents (Father Bashir Ahmad, Rasra Ballia district Uttar Pradesh) who belonged to the historic local Sunni Muslim community Iraqi Biradari. He was educated at Aligarh Muslim University, receiving the degree, respectively, B.A. (Hon) 1936; M.A. 1938.

== Career ==
He passed the Indian civil service examination in India in 1941. In the same year, he was appointed on probation serving the United Province government as assistant magistrate for a year (and not trained in London due to the enactment of Government of India Act 1935). After probation he was allowed more time for on-ground administrative experience by serving the United Province Government as Joint Magistrate from 1942 to 1947. From 1947 to 1950, he was district magistrate and collector (DM) in Pauri Garhwal. By 1946/1947 the decision of the partition of India into two new countries by the British government based on the opinions of the political parties could not spare division within the prestigious ICS. The members of the ICS community were found to be biased toward the political parties. While most of the Muslim ICS opted for the newly formed Pakistan, MA Quraishi was one of the few nationalist and brave ICSs who opted for India as opposed to Pakistan. His action was noted as a victory for true democracy in India in addition to providing stability to civil services in Uttar Pradesh India.

From 1953 to 1957 he worked with the U.P. Government as the Administrator, Municipal Boards, and Improvement Trusts. During the time above, cities with big populations, among others, Lucknow, and Kanpur gained improvement in infrastructure including connectivity to other cities; amendment of the existing ‘THE UTTAR PRADESH MUNICIPALITIES ACT, 1916 took place’. He was the divisional commissioner of Meerut, the biggest division in Uttar Pradesh responsible for administering law and order from 1957-1964. Since February 1964 he has been successful as Secretary of Agricultural Production and Rural Development, in the Government of Uttar Pradesh. In addition, he was Chairman of Agro-Industrial Corporation, U.P.; and a member of the Board of Management, Pantnagar University , and the Committee of Panel of Experts on Agricultural Administration, see the section below and.

Based on his role toward the self-reliant policy in Food and Agriculture by the Uttar Pradesh government, he later served the Ministry of Agriculture/ or departments under Agriculture as secretary, Government of India from 1979 onward; and the vice-chancellor of Dr. Rammanohar Lohia Avadh University, Faizabad. Preiviustly, he was an Indian ambassador to Saudi Arabia (1976-1979).

== Book, a memoir written, and seminar ==
- Quraishi, Manzoor Alam (23 December 1985). Indian Administration, Pre & Post Independence: Memoirs. B.R. Publishing Corporation. ISBN 9788170181866. OCLC 13004480.
- Quraishi, M.A. (1985). Indian agriculture and rural development : then and now - Catalog …. B.R. Pub. Corp.; New Delhi. OCLC 17201432.
- Staff View: Seminar on Rural Development for Weaker Sections. Seminar series (Indian Society of Agricultural Economics). Indian Society of Agricultural Economics. 3 May 1974.
- "Quraishi, M. A. - Webcat".

== Death ==
Quraishi died on 13 February 2000 in Lucknow, Uttar Pradesh.
