= Zafrul Ahsan Lari =

Pakistani civil servant (1909–1975)

Zafrul Ahsan Lari Pakistan Civil Service Administrator

Personal details
- Born: 1909 Lar, Uttar Pradesh, British India
- Died: 27 February 1975 (aged 65–66) Karachi, Pakistan
- Profession: civil servant

Zafrul Ahsan Lari (1909 – 27 February 1975) was an ICS (Punjab Cadre) Administrator of 1934 batch. He faced challenges in his civil service career. Particularly, he worked during Partition of India (1947) at a senior level when civil administration and government in Punjab were under stress due to the influx of refugees from the Indian side of Punjab, providing stability to the civil service run the newly born country Pakistan.

== Early life ==
Zafrul Ahsan Lari was born in 1909 at Lar, Gorakhpur district, United Provinces, India. He was born to parents (Father Abdus Shakoor) who belonged to the historic local Muslim community Iraqi Biradari. He received a B.A. in English literature from Allahabad University in 1930 and was appointed on probation to teach English Literature at Allahabad University for more than one year. Afterward, he fulfilled the U.P. civil service requirement serving the state government in Aligarh for a short time from February 1933 to July 1934.

== Career ==
Zafrul Ahsan Lari passed the Indian civil service examination that took place in Delhi in January 1934. He completed his probationary year of service at St John's College, Oxford and joined the Indian Civil Service in 1934 under the British government in India. He returned to India and was appointed low-level district administrator(s), to get on-field administrative experience, serving the Punjab government until he reached the Deputy Commissioner position in Jhelum (1946). Punjab government appointed him Additional Deputy Commissioner on 11 August 1947 and promoted him Deputy Commissioner, Lahore, on Independence Day (14 August 1947) for looking into refugee camps and refugee rehabilitation issues when Lahore was an uninhabitable place. He had received an additional charge as Chairman of the Lahore Improvement Trust on 1 September 1947, to rebuild Lahore. He rebuilt the burnt-out Shah Almi in the old town by widening the road and developed new areas like Gulberg and Samanabad, to cater to the influx of population.

Toward the end of 1946, the 20-year-old Punjab government dominated by the Unionist party was replaced by the Pakistan Muslim League as a result of new elections in 1946. Two years later on 26 May 1949 when the new Punjab government/or governor appointed him the chairman of the Thal Development Authority on 26 May 1949, he created new cities called Jauharabad, Quaidabad, and Liaquatabad by granting land to anyone who was prepared to settle and work there, thus drawing them away from old towns which were being choked by the influx of refugees.

Zafrul Ahsan laid the foundation of PIA after he was appointed the first managing director of PIA by the government of Pakistan in 1956. He worked relentlessly toward creating a functional national airline and in his 4-year tenure got the ball rolling and set the shape of things to come. The PIA Head Office building at Karachi Airport, which houses all the major departments of the airline, was the brainchild of Mr. Zafar-ul-Ahsan.

President Sikandar Mirza abrogated the Constitution, dissolved the National and Provincial Assemblies, and declared Martial Law, on 7 October 1958. After the Martial Law, he retired from the civil service job in Pakistan. Not only did the ICS and CSP officers facilitate development, but they also took a leadership role in economic and urban planning. Mr. Zafar-ul-Ahsan Lari is an example, an ICS officer who, after retirement, turned into a patriotic entrepreneur. He built the first Soda Ash factory in Pakistan. Before retirement, he was also instrumental in setting up the Pakistan as mentioned above International Airlines (PIA) from scratch.

== See also ==
- Nasreen Jalil, Pakistani senator
- Yasmeen Lari, the first female architect in Pakistan

== Death ==
Lari died in Karachi on 27 February 1975.
