= Abul Hasan Quraishi =

Indian civil servant

Abul Hasan Quraishi Civil Service Government of India, Government of Pakistan

Personal details
- Born: 1 July 1908 Ballia, Uttar Pradesh, British India
- Died: unknown (after 14 August 1947) Karachi, Pakistan
- Profession: civil servant

Abul Hasan Quraishi (born 1 July 1908, date of death unknown) was a member of the ICS (Bengal cadre). He had a long and distinct career in the Civil Service by serving the governments in India and the newly born Pakistan government after the partition of India.

== Early life ==
Abul Hasan Quraishi was born on 1 July 1908 at Rasra Ballia. He was born to parents ( father Abdul Hameed Rasra, Ballia Uttar Pradesh India ) who belonged to the historic local Muslim community Iraqi Biradari. He received early education at Government High School Ballia, Queen's Intermediate College, Benaras, and completed B.A. degree from Allahabad University (1927). Early in 1933, he went to London to research administrative skills at the School of Oriental Studies (now the School of Oriental and African Studies).

== Career ==
In January 1933 Quraishi passed the ICS examination. After a probation period in London, as mentioned above, he joined the Indian civil service on 5th Oct 1933 and arrived in India on Nov. 1933. He was appointed at Murshidabad in Bengal, India as Assistant Magistrate and Collector. He was promoted as joint magistrate and sub-divisional officer, in July 1935. He became a special officer, in the finance department in Nov 1937. In Jan 1942 he became district magistrate and collector, Jan. 1942. Afterward, in Oct 1944, he was sent to the Government of India with a secretary position under the Ministry of Commerce and Industry/ or department under the aforementioned ministry, holding the office until 1946. By the end of 1946, 90-odd ICS officers from the Muslim community inclined to have gone on to serve independent Pakistan except for a few with their names as reported. Many of them were from northern India or the Bengal cadre of the ICS (including the aforementioned Quraishi) and formed the core of a new central service called the Pakistan Administrative Service (PAS).

== Death ==
Quraishi died in Karachi, Pakistan.
