= Peter Gwynn =

Last British civil servant in India

J. P. L. Gwynn
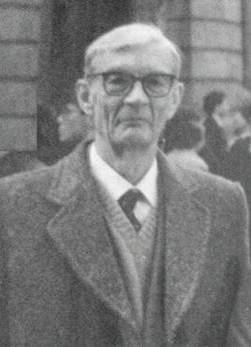
- Born: John Peter Lucius Gwyn; 22 June 1916; London, England
- Died: 14 September 1999 (aged 83); Bromley, England
- Occupation: Civil servant

John Peter Lucius Gwynn (22 June 1916 – 14 September 1999) was a British civil servant, whose career spanned the colonial Indian Civil Service, the independent Civil Services of India, and the British Civil Service.

== Early life ==
His father was John Tudor Gwynn, at that time a serving member of the Indian Civil Service (ICS), later to become a Manchester Guardian correspondent and writer on Indian affairs. His mother was Joan Elton Sedding, daughter of the architect John Dando Sedding.

Gwynn's first five years were spent in Madras State in India. In 1921 his father retired from the ICS on account of increasing deafness and the family returned to Britain. Peter attended the Dragon School in Oxford until his father took over Baymount Preparatory School in Dublin as proprietor/headmaster and the family settled in Ireland. Peter then attended St Columba's College, Dublin and went on to study Classics at Trinity College Dublin, where he took his BA Honours (first class, with gold medal) in 1938.

== Indian Civil Service career ==
Gwynn spent a year training for the Indian Civil Service and studying Sanskrit at University College London before entering the service in November 1939. He was posted in Madras Presidency and worked in the Telugu-speaking part of that province which later became Andhra State and then part of Andhra Pradesh.

After Indian Independence Act 1947 in 1947 Peter Gwynn opted to stay on in the civil service under the new Government of India.

In 1959 Peter Gwynn married Patricia Margaret “Peggy” Satur, daughter of Andrew Satur, a businessman of Madras. The couple had two sons, John Jude Lucius Gwynn (born 1960) and Robert Charles Patrick Gwynn (born 1963).

Peter Gwynn became Secretary in the Education Ministry of Andhra Pradesh and was instrumental in the introduction of compulsory primary education in that state. After that he served as Second Secretary in the Board of Revenue until his retirement from the ICS. When he retired in 1968 he was apparently the last remaining British member of the service.

In addition to his official duties Peter Gwynn contributed in his spare time to the cultural life of Andhra Pradesh, helping to found the Telugu Academy in Hyderabad and serving as a member of the governing body of the Salar Jung Museum.

== Later life ==
In 1968 the family moved to England where Peter Gwynn entered the UK civil service as a Treasury under secretary, remaining in post until his final retirement in 1976. During his retirement he worked on his linguistic projects, compiling a Telugu grammar book in conjunction with Professor Bhadriraju Krishnamurti (A Grammar of Modern Telugu, Oxford University Press, 1985) and completing a dictionary of the Telugu language (A Telugu-English Dictionary, Oxford University Press, 1991).

Peter Gwynn died in Bromley, Kent on 14 September 1999.

== Works ==
- A Grammar of Modern Telugu (1985) (with Prof. Bhadriraju Krishnamurti)
- A Telugu-English Dictionary (1991)
