= Telugu Academy =

Two Telegu language organizations in India

The Telugu Academy, known as the Telugu and Sanskrit Akademi (Telugu: తెలుగు మరియు సంస్కృత అకాడమీ, romanized: Telugu mariyu Saṁskr̥ta Akāḍamī) in official materials and some sources, can refer to two institutes set up to promote the use of Telugu and develop, preserve, and modernize the language. The original one was set up by the Andhra Pradesh state government, while a new one using the original Hyderabad offices has been formed by the Telangana state government after bifurcation. The Academy has also become responsible for the creation and printing of school textbooks. This academy headquarters is located at Tirupati, Andhra Pradesh.

== History ==
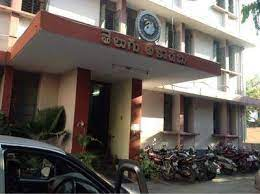
Telugu Academy offices in Hyderabad

A committee led by J. P. L. Gwynn was formed by the Andhra Pradesh government to "modernize" Telugu and make it the primary medium for administration and education in 1966 in light of the central government's decision to promote regional languages in the same fields. Based on the committee's recommendation and the central government's scheme, the state government created the Telugu Academy as a government institute for promoting Telugu in 1968. P. V. Narasimha Rao started chairing the Academy the same year, possibly being the inaugural holder of the role.

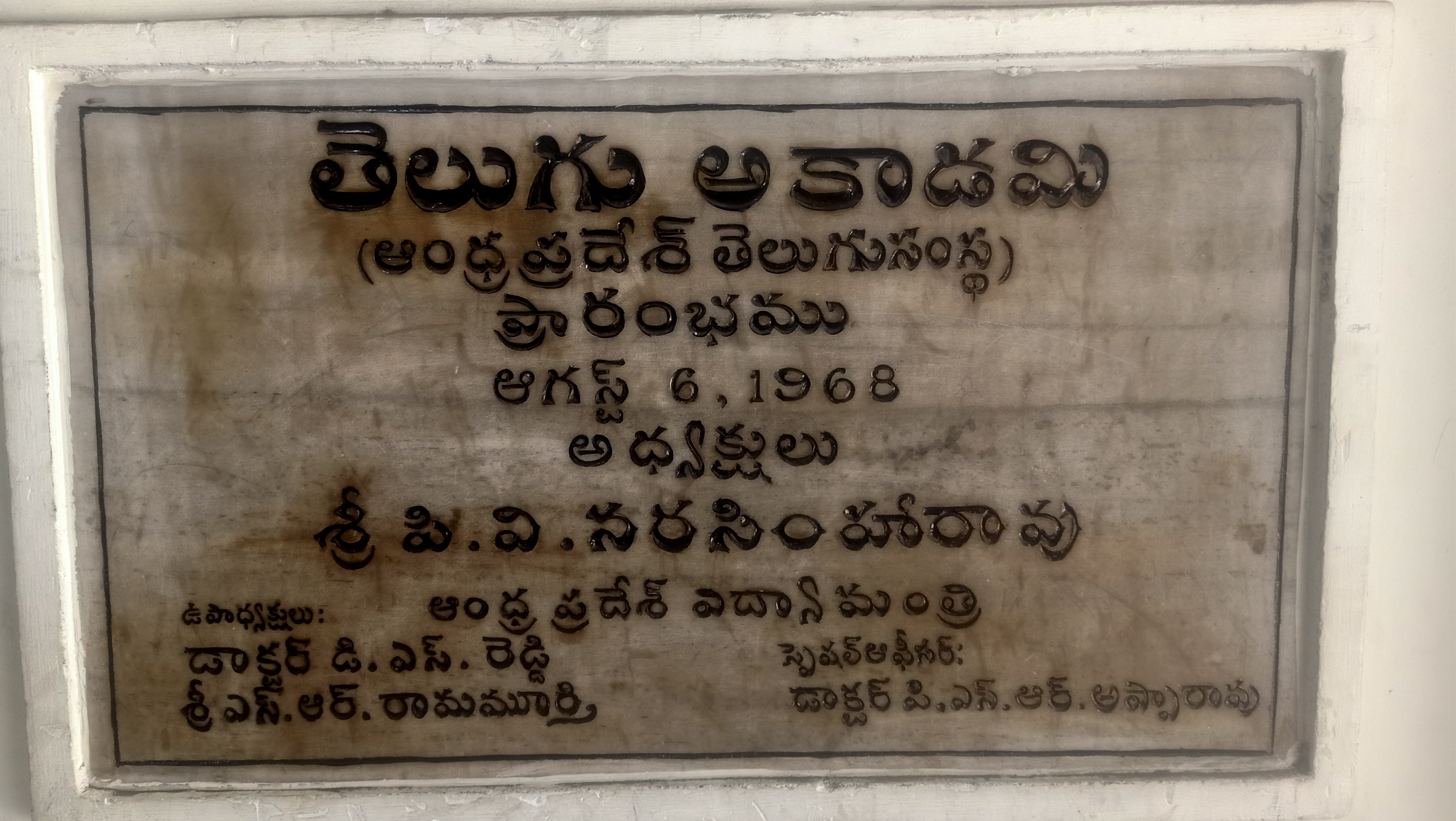
Petroglyph of Telugu Academy Inauguration

According to current chairperson Lakshmi Parvathi, the institute printed only Telugu books until the 1998-99 school year, where it diversified into publishing maths, science and English textbooks as well.

=== Post bifurcation (2014-present) ===
After the separation of Telangana, the Academy entered a state of limbo as although AP set up the institute and has regional centres throughout the state, the main office in Hyderabad was located in Telangana and it took responsibility for funding its operations. During this period, its activities were significantly slowed down. A court agreement was reached giving AP and TG a 58-42 split of the Academy's assets, and AP decided to rename its academy to "AP Telugu Sanskrit Akademi" and reestablish it in Tirupati. The latter decision caused some objection from opposition parties and figures, who claimed that signified a reduction in the status of Telugu and that the Academy was already underfunded and would now have to make its budget stretch even further, while officials defended the change by pointing to the use of Sanskrit for technical vocabulary in Telugu. Member of parliament G. V. L. Narasimha Rao and actor-cum-politician Pawan Kalyan proposed that a separate Sanskrit academy should be set up instead.

In 2019, the Academy was criticized for a 2016 book on the Telangana movement which had a significant number of factual and writing errors as well as contentious statements. Six months later, the Academy announced a panel to review and correct the issues.

As part of the bifurcation, the Academy's assets were audited. It was found in 2021 that staff at a credit society where the institution had fixed deposits had embezzled ₹600 million (equivalent to ₹730 million or US$7.6 million in 2026) from the deposited funds.

== List of chairs ==
- P. V. Narasimha Rao (1968–1974)
- Lakshmi Parvathi (6 November 2019 – present)
