= Nasreen Jalil =

Pakistani politician

Deputy mayor of Karachi
- In office 17 October 2005 – 19 February 2010
- Preceded by: Tariq Hasan
- Succeeded by: Arshad Abdullah Vohra

Senate of Pakistan from Sindh
- In office 2 March 2012 – March 2018
- In office March 1994 – March 2000

Personal details
- Born: 22 February 1944 (age 82) Karachi, Sindh, British India
- Education: University of Punjab
- Occupation: Politician

Nasreen Jalil (Urdu: نسرین جلیل) (born 22 February 1944) is a Pakistani politician and a senior leader of the MQM-P. She served as a member of the Senate of Pakistan from Sindh from 2012 to 2018. Previously, she served as the Deputy Mayor of Karachi.

== Early life ==
Jalil was born in Lahore on 22 February 1944, then part of British India, her family were from the United Provinces but had settled in Karachi. Her father, Zafrul Ahsan Lari was the deputy commissioner of Lahore at the time of the British Indian Empire in 1947, and later he worked as an Indian Civil Service (ICS) officer. Her sister is the Pakistani architect, Yasmeen Lari.

== Political career ==
Nasreen Jalil was elected to the senate of Pakistan in March 1994 for a six-year term. She was member of the Senate Standing Committees on commerce and on foreign affairs, Kashmir affairs and northern affairs and on health, social welfare and special education and also chairperson on Functional Committee on Human Rights.

In January 2006 she became Naib Nazim of Karachi, during the swearing in ceremony Jalil pledged that underdeveloped areas of the city would be developed and also that women's rights would be safeguarded.

In the Senate election held on 2 March 2012, Nasreen Jalil was elected as a senator from Sindh.

Nasreen Jalil is the deputy convener of Muttahida Qaumi Movement Khalid Maqbool Group's (MQM-P) Coordinate Committee.

She is the chairperson of Senate's Standing Committee on Finance, Revenue, Economic Affairs, Statistics, P&D and Privatization.
