= Greek Cemetery, Kolkata =

Cemetery in Kolkata

Greek Cemetery
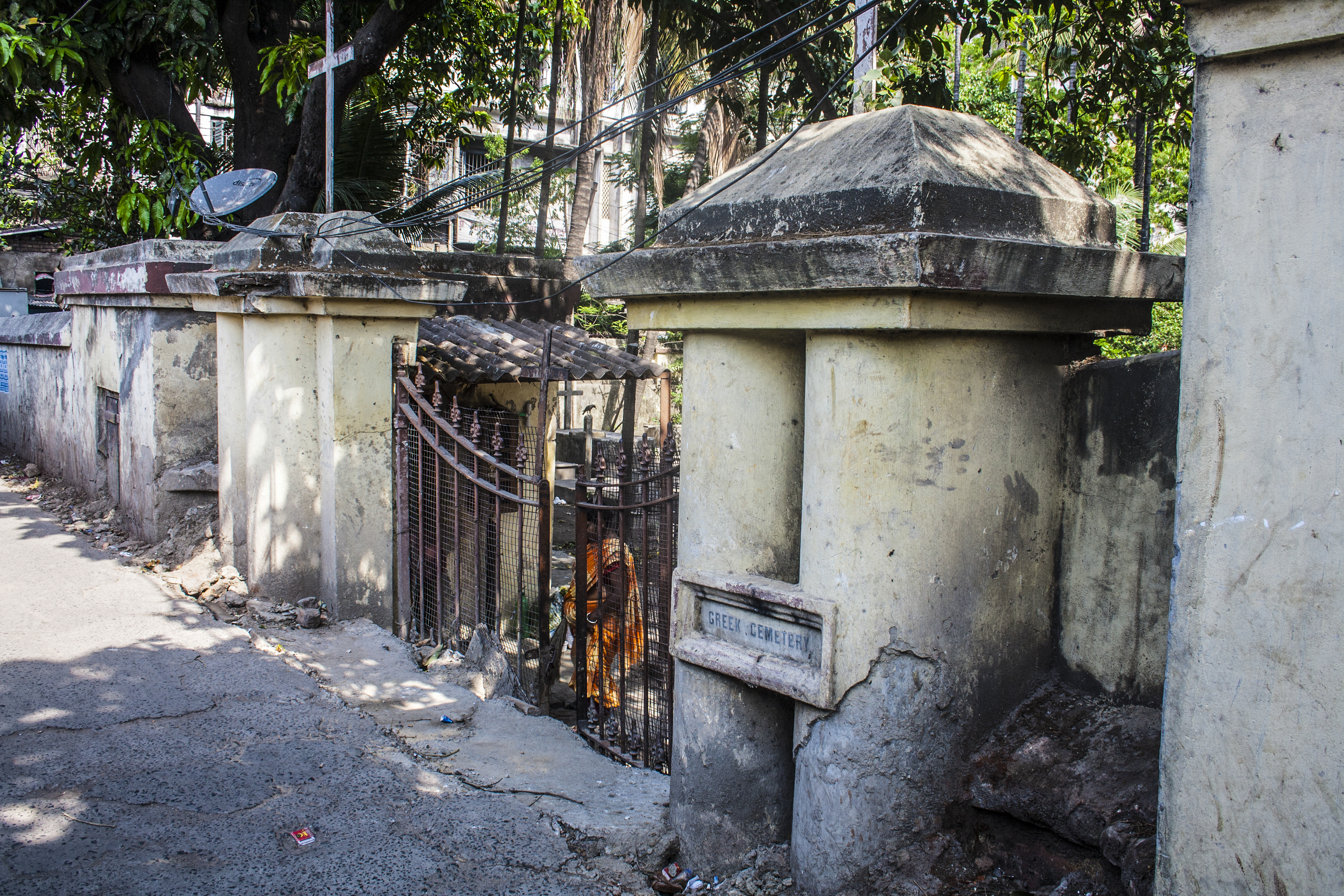
- Entrance of Greek Cemetery
- Interactive map of Greek Cemetery

Details
- Established: 1777
- Location: Abul Kalam Azad Sarani, Phoolbagan, Kolkata, West Bengal
- Country: India
- Coordinates: 22°34′21″N 88°23′21″E
- Type: Greek cemetery

The Greek Cemetery is a heritage cemetery situated beside Abul Kalam Azad Sarani, at Phoolbagan in Kolkata, in the Indian state of West Bengal.

== History ==
The Greek mercantile community settled in Kolkata during the expansion of trade under the British East India Company. In 1977, the burial ground was established to serve members of the Greek community. It was declared as a Grade I heritage building by KMC. It is the only Greek cemetery extisting in India.

== See also ==
- Greek Orthodox Church
- Greeks in India
- Armenian Church of the Holy Nazareth
- South Park Street Cemetery
