= Mansoor Hasan =

Indian cardiologist

- Born: 1938 (age 87–88); Aligarh, Uttar Pradesh, India
- Occupation: Cardiologist
- Parent: Ajmal Hasan Khan
- Awards: Padma Shri; IMA Certificate of Honour
- Website: Official web site

Mansoor Hasan Khan, is an Indian cardiologist, known for his contributions towards the setting up of Lari Cardiology Centre at King George's Medical University, Lucknow. The Government of India honored Hasan in 2011, with the fourth highest civilian award of Padma Shri.

== Biography ==
Mansoor Hasan was born in 1938 in Aligarh district, in the Indian state of Uttar Pradesh, in a socially known Pathan family which migrated from the Afghan mountains in the 17th century. His father, Ajmal Hasan Khan, a medical practitioner, was the grand son of Abdul Majeed Khwaja, who co-founded Jamia Millia Islamia and his mother came from the family of the Nawabs of Bhopal. He did his early schooling in Aligarh and completed intermediate examination from the Government College there. His graduate studies were in London which was followed by higher studies at the Royal College of Physicians of Edinburgh from where he obtained the degree of MRCP in 1964. His career began in 1962 at King George's Medical University where he taught till his retirement in 1996 as the Head of the Cardiology department. During a brief interlude, he also had special training in cardiology at London. Post retirement, Hasan is associated with Sahara Hospital, Lucknow.

Mansoor Hasan is a former president of the Cardiological Society of India and a consultant to the Armed Forces of India, Cromwell Hospital, London and Escorts Hospital, New Delhi. He is a member of the Executive councils of Aligarh Muslim University, Jamia Millia Islamia, the University of Kanpur and the University of Lucknow. He is credited with over 50 publications in national and international journals and has guided more than 30 MD students. A recipient of the Certificate of Honour from the Indian Medical Association, Lucknow chapter, Hasan was awarded Padma Shri by the Government of India in 2011, for his contributions to the field of medicine.

== See also ==
- King George's Medical University
