= V. K. Rao =

Indian civil servant (1914-2018)

Valluri Kameswara Rao

Principal Secretary to the President
- In office 1981–1982
- President of India: Neelam Sanjiva Reddy

Personal details
- Born: 15 July 1914 Godavari District, Madras Presidency, British Raj
- Died: 27 November 2018 (aged 104) Hyderabad, Telangana, India
- Education: Loyola College, Chennai (University of Madras); Sidney Sussex College, Cambridge

Valluri Kameswara Rao (15 July 1914 – 27 November 2018) was an Indian Civil Service officer and Chief Secretary of Andhra Pradesh, and the oldest living officer of the Indian Civil Service at the time of his death. He served in the civil service of the British Raj as a collector and magistrate. After Independence Rao joined the Indian government's finance department and transferred into the newly founded Indian Administrative Service. He transferred to Andhra State after it was founded in 1953. After the founding of Andhra Pradesh in 1956 Rao became that state's first secretary of public works. He later served the central government on the Planning Commission before returning to Andhra Pradesh as its chief secretary. Rao was principal secretary to the President of India Neelam Sanjiva Reddy from 1981 to 1982.

== Early life and career ==
Rao was born in a small village in the Godavari District of the Madras Presidency, the present-day East Godavari District of Andhra Pradesh. He had five siblings, three brothers and two sisters. His oldest brother Valluri Parthasarathi was a judge of Andhra Pradesh High Court. He got married at the age of 18 to Nidamarthi Prabhavathi in the year 1932. Rao's son Valluri Narayan is a retired IAS officer, he retired as member secretary, Expenditure Reform Commission. After completing high school in Razole, he took a bachelor's degree in Mathematics from Sidney Sussex College at the University of Cambridge. At his father's insistence, he then sat the Indian Civil Service examinations in London, succeeding on his second attempt. He was appointed to the ICS (on probation) on 29 September 1937, and was confirmed in his appointment on 9 September 1938 (gazetted 1 September 1938).

Arriving in India in October 1938, Rao was initially posted to Midnapore in the Bengal Presidency (now in West Bengal) as an assistant collector and magistrate, and was promoted to joint magistrate and deputy collector in May 1941, receiving an appointment as under-secretary to the Finance Department in August. He witnessed the Bengal famine of 1943, and was appointed deputy controller (procurement and purchase) in May 1944, with a subsequent appointment as deputy director of supply. He was in Bengal on the Direct Action Day of 16 August 1946, which led to widespread communal riots, and was a joint magistrate and collector at the time of Indian independence.

== Post-independence career ==
A month after Independence and Partition, on 27 September 1947, Rao was transferred to the Finance Department of the Madras Government as a deputy secretary, his final posting before the old ICS was converted into the new Indian Administrative Service. He was transferred to the Revenue Department on 28 February 1948, and was appointed district collector of Visakhapatnam district on 29 April 1950. He received further appointments as a deputy secretary (public department) on 15 April 1953 and as deputy secretary (Andhra Affairs) on 12 August 1953. Ahead of the formation of the new state of Andhra Pradesh in 1956, Rao was transferred to the Andhra State cadre of IAS officers on 1 October 1953, was promoted to secretary of the Finance Department of Andhra Pradesh from the same date, and was appointed the first secretary of the Andhra Pradesh Public Works Department upon the formation of the new state on 1 November 1956. Rao later entered the service of the central government, serving on the Planning Commission of India before returning to Andhra Pradesh and becoming the state's Chief Secretary, the highest-ranking civil servant in a state.

== Retirement and death ==
Following his retirement he served as Vigilance Commissioner of Andhra Pradesh from 1974 to 1977, and then as Principal Secretary to the President of India, N. Sanjiva Reddy, from 1981 to 1982. On 13 December 2016 he was present in Hyderabad for the release of a book on a former ICS colleague, C. S. Ramachandran. He continued to live in Hyderabad until his death in November 2018 at the age of 104.
