= Panioty Fountain =

Memorial fountain in Calcutta, India

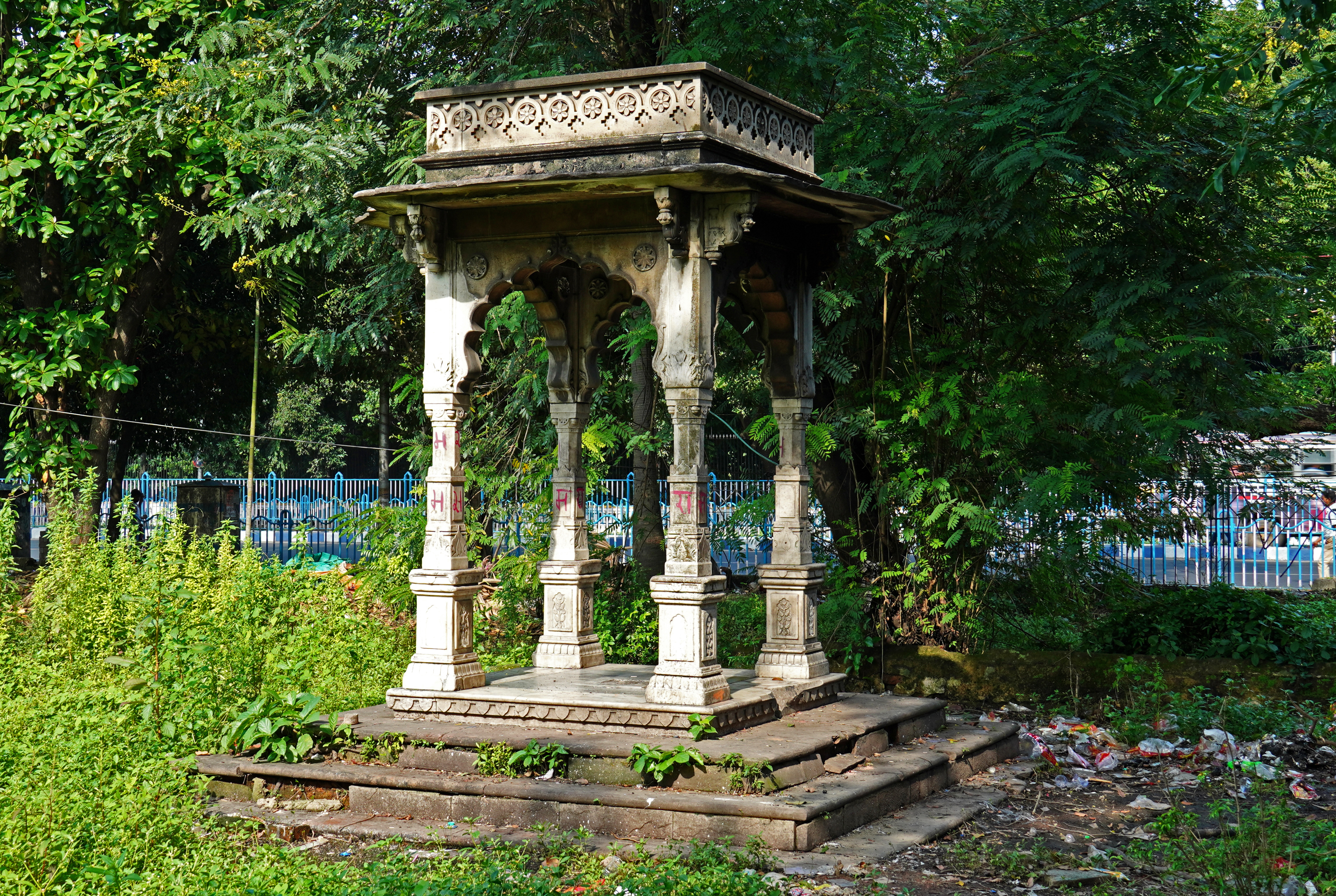
- Panioty Fountain in Esplanade, Calcutta
- Interactive map of Panioty Fountain
- Location: Curzon Park, Esplanade, Calcutta, West Bengal, India
- Coordinates: 22.5659°N 88.3486°E
- Type: Memorial drinking water fountain
- Material: Jaipur marble
- Opening date: 1898
- Dedicated to: Demetrius Panioty
- Heritage status: Grade I Heritage Structure

The Panioty Fountain is a nineteenth-century memorial drinking water fountain in Esplanade, Calcutta, West Bengal, India. It was erected in 1898 in memory of Demetrius Panioty, a member of Calcutta's Greek community who served as assistant private secretary to several Viceroys of India. Commissioned by Lord Curzon, the fountain is built of Jaipur marble in the Indo-Saracenic style and is listed as a Grade I heritage structure by the KMC.

The fountain was designed both as a public utility and as a memorial, reflecting the late colonial practice of commemorating prominent civic figures through ornamental drinking fountains. Its carved marble pavilion and architectural characteristics have made it a notable colonial civic architecture in Calcutta. Concerns over its deteriorating condition have drawn the attention of the historians and conservationists, who have called for its preservation.

== Backdrop ==
During the mid-18th century, the Greeks started arriving in India under the British rule, primarily for trading. Among the first Greeks to have settled in Bengal was Panayiotis Alexandros Argyree. Argyree anglicised his name from Panayiotis to "Panioty" for better acceptance and ease of trading with the British East India Company officials.

Around the 1750s, Panioty was appointed as a translator for Thornhill, a British captain. In the 1770s, under the leadership of Warren Hastings, he undertook a mission to Egypt to secure trading rights for the British. After he returned successfully, Hastings rewarded him with the permission to build a Greek church on Amatollah Street in Calcutta. For multiple generations, his descendants moved between Dacca and Calcutta for their family business. Some of his descendants also worked for the British, securing trading rights in multiple countries. Over time, they were appointed to administrative roles by the British in colonial India.

== History ==
One of the descendants of Panayiotis Alexandros Argyree was Emanuel Panioty. Emanuel Panioty's son, Demetrius Panioty, began his professional life in 1849 as a writer at the Bengal Secretariat, when he was just 16 years old. In 1853, he was transferred to the Governor-General's private secretary office in the Durbar department. After Lord Ripon became the Governor General of India in 1880, Demetrius was appointed as Lord Ripon's assistant private secretary. Owing to Demetrius Panioty's closeness with Lord Ripon, Perrine Panioty, Demetrius' wife, was appointed as Vicereine Lady Dufferin's interpreter. Till his death in 1895, Demetrius served as the private secretary to Lord Ripon in Shimla. For his service to the British Empire, he was honoured with the Companion of the Indian Empire (CIE) by Queen Victoria.

In 1898, in memory of Demetrius Panioty's contributions towards the British Empire, a marble drinking water fountain was installed at the initiative of Lord Curzon. It was installed at a prime location in that era—between Esplanade Row and Old Court House Street. Presently, its address is opposite to the Esplanade Mansion, at the northwest corner of the Bhasha Uddyan, or the Surendra Nath Banerjee Park (previously known as the Curzon Park).

== Architecture ==
The square–shaped marble pavilion of the fountain has four pillars supporting its roof. The roof is octagonal in structure. The base of the pavilion is stepped. The stepped plinth raises the pavilion above the surrounding ground level. There is a single row of floral ornamentation on the upper boundary of the structure — a continuous band that runs below the roofline. Stucco art and floral motifs are sculpted on each of the four columns. Towards the bottom end of the columns, a potted plant along with its flowers and leaves has been carved. The central structure of the fountain is made from cast iron. Several Indo-Greek designs are carved on it.

The fountain pavilion, along with its canopy, is made with marbles brought from Jaipur and has been designed in the Indo-Saracenic style of architecture. On each of its four faces, there are nine-foiled cusped arches, displaying Victorian architecture combined with the Mughal architectural style. The arches are framed by mouldings and carved spandrels. The arches are supported by the four marble columns. The extended roof of the fountain's pavilion served as a temporary resting spot for the travellers, who could briefly rejuvenate themselves after drinking from the fountain. The structure is open on all four sides, allowing ventilation.

== Inscriptions ==
A Biblical quote is inscribed on the top of one arch — "A good name is rather to be chosen than great riches." On the eastern side the inscription reads — "In Memory of Demetrius Panioty C.I.E. Assistant Private Secretary to the Viceroy who died at Simla July 17th, 1895." On the western side it's engraved — "This Fountain was erected as a tribute to faithful and assiduous service extending over a period of forty-two years. By the Viceroys and Private Secretaries who gratefully remember it. AD 1890."

== Ignominy and decline ==
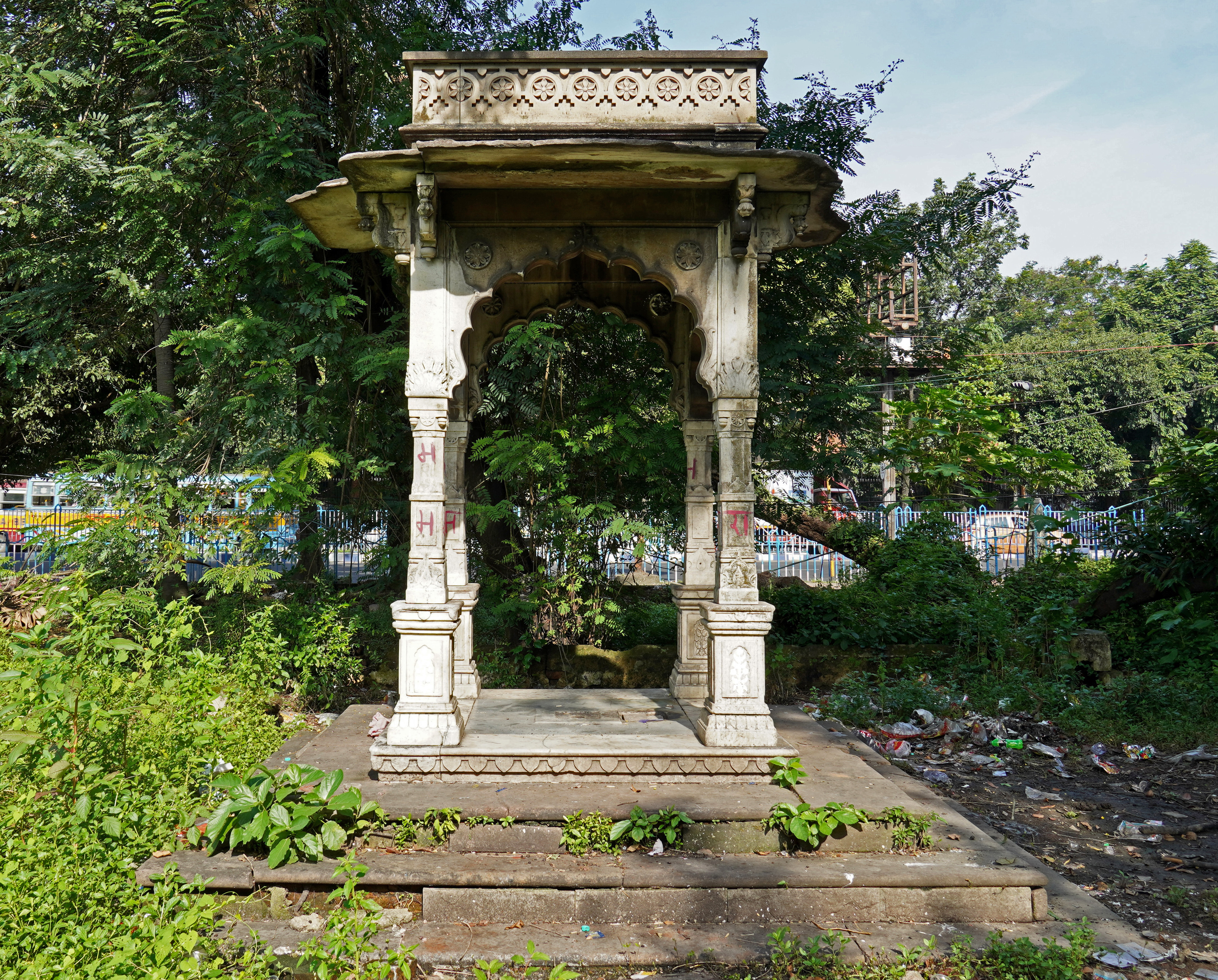
The deteriorating condition of the fountain and its surroundings

The fountain is no longer in operation. Ignominy and lack of management have rendered the structure ramshackle. Most of the inscriptions on the fountain pillars have worn down over time. The only one that remains readable is "A good name is rather to be chosen than great riches." Most of the intricate carvings have also dilapidated over time. Ignorant people, oblivious of the fountain's history and significance in Calcutta's Greek heritage, have scribbled on the columns. Years of rain and sunlight coupled with the lack of maintenance have made the marbles lose their original colours.

The protruding parts of the roof have worn out over time. The inner overhanging soffits are also mostly dilapidated. The environs of the fountain have been covered with overgrown grass and weeds. Plastic bottles and waste bags lie on the base of the pavilion. Heavy rainfall renders the place muddy. But the government hasn't taken any initiative to protect and preserve the monument, despite concerns raised by historians. Authorities haven't even put up a signboard beside the fountain to indicate this heritage monument, which is a significant symbol of the Greek community's heritage in Calcutta.

== The Philosopher's Stone ==
The Panioty Fountain was displayed in the opening scene of Satyajit Ray's 1958 cult classic Parash Pathar (The Philosopher's Stone). In the scene, Tulsi Chakraborty is seen running to escape the incessant downpour, and at the end, he finds shelter under the extended baldaquin of the Panioty fountain.

== Nearby historical landmarks ==
Esplanade has a rich history of colonial–era and post–independence landmarks. Historical landmarks in and around the Panioty Fountain include the Esplanade Mansions, Raj Bhavan, Ochterlony Monument, Dalhousie Square, Writers' Building, General Post Office, Currency Building and St. John's Church.
