= Lar, Uttar Pradesh =

Lar Lar Bazar
- Town
- Location in Uttar Pradesh, India Lar (India)
- Coordinates: 26.2°N 83.97°Eand has an average elevation of 62 metres (203 feet).
- Country: India
- State: Uttar Pradesh
- District: Deoria
- Elevation: 62 m (203 ft)

Languages
  - Official: Hindi
  - Others: Bhojpuri, Urdu
- Time zone: UTC+5:30 (IST)
- PIN: 274502
- Vehicle registration: UP 52
- Website: up.gov.in

Lar is a town, a nagar panchayat, and is a block headquarter in Deoria district in the Indian state of Uttar Pradesh. It belongs to Salempur tehsil in the district Deoria under Gorakhpur Division.

== Geography ==
Lar is noted for a historical bazaar i.e., a business centre; it lies at a short distance 3.2 KM toward east of the nearest railway station Lar Road. In addition, the business centre, 5-8 KM toward east within Lar block, is connected with many villages that exist on the western bank of river Chhoti Gandak or riverbanks partly surrounded by both Chhoti Gandak and Ghaghara. In historical period, Lar was part of big Majhauli Raj in Deoria before 1947. The people including men from Lar in the aforementioned princely state took part in the freedom struggle, The Indian Rebellion of 1857, against British rule. Lar is located 45 KM toward south of the District headquarter Deoria.

== Demographics ==
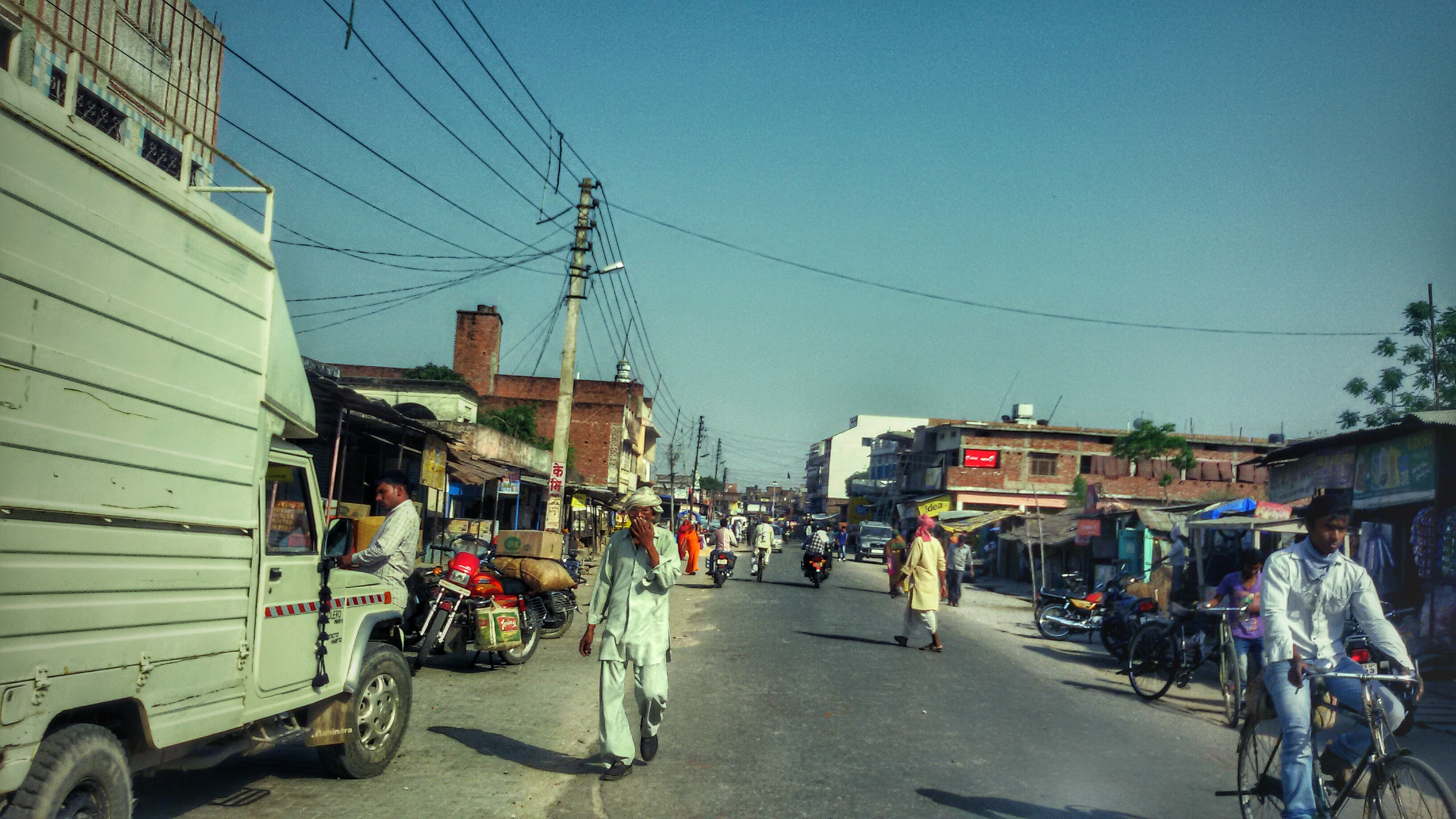
Lar Town Main Road

As of 2011 India census: Lar had a population of 25,492; Males constitute 51% of the population and females 49%; Lar has an average literacy rate of 69%, lower than the national average of 74.04%; male literacy is 70%, and female literacy is 55% and; in Lar, 17% of the population is under 6 years of age. The population is divided in 16 wards, has local self-government at the level of Nagar Panchayat and they elect their representatives for their wards every five years.

== Language ==
The people in the town of Lar mostly speak Bhojpuri, Hindi and Urdu; English is increasingly understood by the educated younger populations in the area.

== Education ==
Lar has many colleges, several schools, and some madrasa. Notably, these include Swami Devanand Post Graduate College Math Lar Deoria, B.S.P.G college Pindi, O.K.M Inter College, S.Z.M.P high school, S.D Inter college, Ayesha Rashid Girls High school, an old government Junior High School, and DarulUloom Mohammadia Ramnagar.

The above mentioned OKM Inter College, including some houses as landmark buildings in Lar, were built by the family of Abdul Aziz Lari Khan Saheb a century ago.

== See also ==
- Abdul Rauf Lari, freedom activist,Uttar Pradesh legislative assembly member
- Ram Naresh Kushwaha, Member of Parliament and Rajya Sabha
- Maqbool Ahmed Lari, known businessperson, philanthropist and Padma Shri
- Yasmeen Lari, Internationally renowned Pakistani architect and Pakistan's first female architect Sitara-e-Imtiaz
- Zafrul Ahsan Lari, ICS (Punjab Cadre) Administrator from the 1934 batch. Sitara-e-Imtiaz
