= Indian Civil Service =

Civil service of the British Raj (1858–1947)

The Indian Civil Service (abbreviated as ICS, officially known as the Imperial Civil Service) was the higher civil service of the British Raj in the period between 1858 and 1947.

Its members administered more than 300 million people in the presidencies and provinces of British India and were ultimately responsible for overseeing all government activity in the 250 districts of India. They were appointed under Section XXXII(32) of the Government of India Act 1858, enacted by the British Parliament. The ICS was headed by the Secretary of State for India, a member of the British Cabinet. At first, almost all the top thousand members of the ICS, known as "Civilians", were British and had been educated in the best British schools.

At the time of the partition of India in 1947, the outgoing Government of India's ICS was divided between India and Pakistan. (Note: ICS members in Pakistan was originally administering equally both West Pakistan and East Pakistan. However, Pakistan was split into two. West Pakistan is now renamed to Islamic Republic of Pakistan, and East Pakistan is now renamed to People's Republic of Bangladesh.) Although these are now organised differently, the contemporary Civil Services of India, the Central Superior Services of Pakistan, Bangladesh Civil Service, and Myanmar Civil Service are all descended from the old Indian Civil Service. Historians often rate the ICS, together with the railway system, the legal system, and the Indian Army, as among the most important legacies of British rule in India.

== History and origins ==
From 1858, after the demise of the East India Company's rule in India, the British civil service took on its administrative responsibilities. The change in governance came about due to the Indian Rebellion of 1857, which came close to toppling British rule in the country.

=== Entry and setting ===
Up to 1853, the Directors of the East India Company made appointments of covenanted civil servants by nomination. This nomination system was abolished by the British Parliament in 1853, and it was decided that appointments would be through competitive examinations of British subjects, without distinction of race. The examination for admission to the service was first held only in London in August of each year. All candidates were required to pass a horse-riding test.

An appointment to the civil service of the Company will not be a matter of favour but a matter of right. He who obtains such an appointment will owe it solely to his own abilities and industry. It is undoubtedly desirable that the civil servants of the Company should have received the best, the most finished education that the native country affords (the Report insisted that the civil servants of the Company should have taken the first degree in arts at Oxford or Cambridge Universities).

— Macaulay Committee Report

The competitive examination for entry to the civil service was combined for the Diplomatic, the Home, the Indian, and the Colonial Services. Candidates had to be aged between 18 and 23 to take the exam. The total marks possible in the examination were 1,900 and one could get up to three opportunities to enter. Successful candidates underwent one or two years of probation in the United Kingdom, according to whether they had taken the London or the Indian examination. This period was spent at the University of Oxford (Indian Institute), the University of Cambridge, colleges in the University of London (including the School of Oriental Studies) or Trinity College Dublin, where a candidate studied the law and institutions of India, including criminal law and the law of evidence, which together gave knowledge of the revenue system, as well as reading Indian history and learning the language of the province to which they had been assigned.

The Early Nationalists, also known as the Moderates, worked for implementation of various social reforms such as the appointment of a Public Service Commission and a resolution of the House of Commons (1893) allowing for simultaneous examination for the Indian Civil Service in London and India.

By 1920, there were five methods of entry into the higher civil service: the open competitive examinations in London, separate competitive examinations in India, nomination in India to satisfy provincial and communal representation, promotion from the Provincial Civil Service, and appointments from the bar (one-fourth of the posts in the ICS were to be filled from the bar).

== Uniform and dress ==
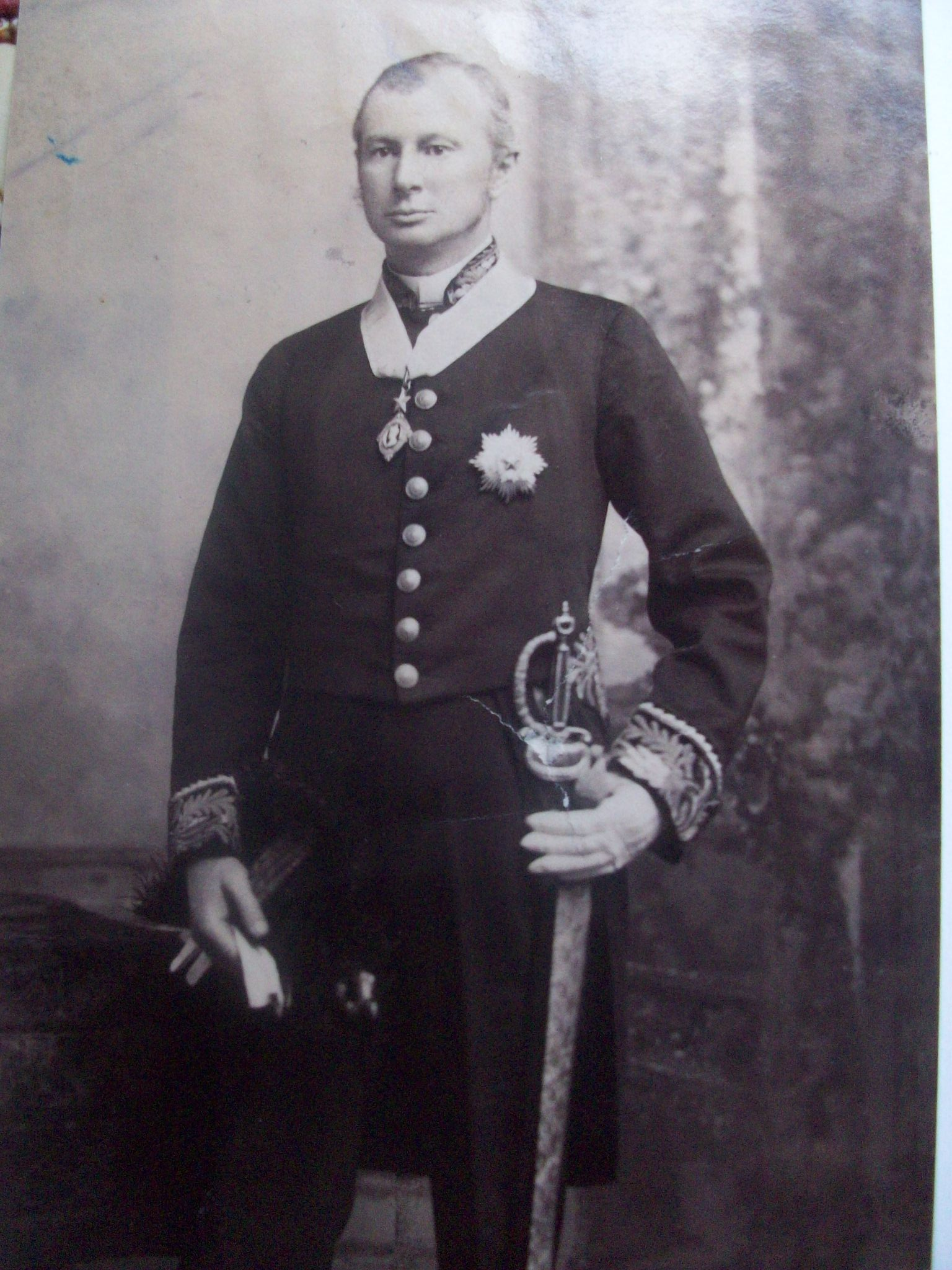
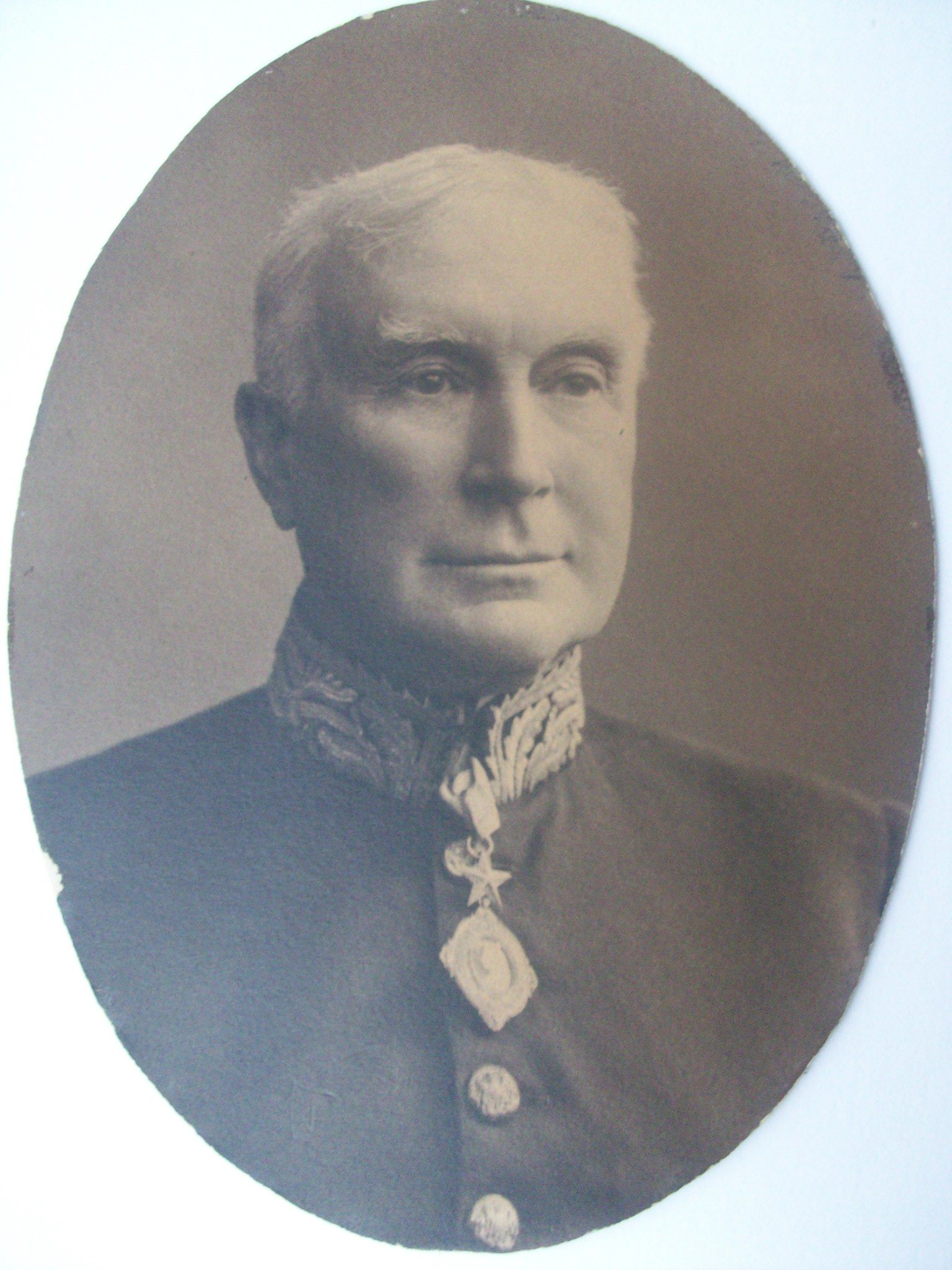
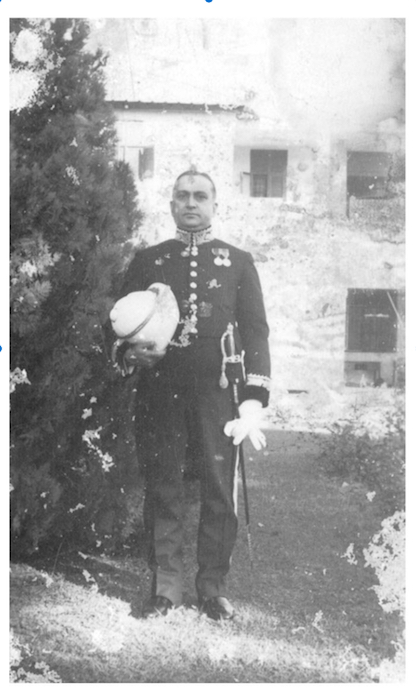
Sir Henry Edward Stokes, Sir Gabriel Stokes and V. Narahari Rao in the uniform of the Indian Civil Service.

Queen Victoria had suggested that the civil servants in India should have an official dress uniform code, as did their counterparts in the Colonial Service, but the Council of India decided that prescribing a dress uniform would be an undue expense for their officials.

The only civilians allowed a dress uniform by regulations were those who had distinct duties of a political kind to perform, and who were thereby brought into frequent and direct personal contact with native princes. This uniform included a blue coat with gold embroidery, a black velvet lining, collar and cuffs, blue cloth trousers with gold and lace two inches wide, a beaver cocked hat with black silk cockade and ostrich feathers, and a sword.

== Nature and role ==
The civil services were divided into two categories – covenanted and uncovenanted. The covenanted civil service consisted of British civil servants occupying the higher posts in the government. The uncovenanted civil service was introduced to facilitate the entry of Indians at the lower rung of the administration.

== Salary and ranks ==
=== Salary ===
Following the Indian Rebellion of 1857, pay scales were drawn up. Assistant Commissioners started out in their early twenties on around £300 a year. The governorship of a British province was the highest post an ICS officer could aspire to. The governors at the top of the pyramid got £6,000 a year plus allowances. All ICS officers retired on the same pension of £1,000. This sum was paid as an annuity each year after retirement. Widows of deceased officers were entitled to £300 a year, leading to a popular saying that an ICS marriage was worth "three hundred a year alive or dead". In the first decades of the twentieth century, the imbalance in salaries and emoluments was so great that 8,000 European officials together earned a total of £13,930,554, while 130,000 Indians in government service (not just those in the Indian Civil Service proper) were collectively paid a total of £3,284,163.

=== Tenure and service ===
ICS officers normally served for a minimum of twenty-five years, and there was a maximum service period of thirty-five years. ICS officers served as political officers in the Indian Political Department and also were given fifty percent of the judgeships in the state high court (the rest were generally elevated from the high court bar). The tenure of ICS officers serving as judges of the high court and Supreme Court was determined by the retirement age fixed for judges.

=== Ranks ===
Source: (Note: As per published records and book named "The India List and India Office List 1905" as published by India Office and India Office Records.) (Note: As per Warrant or Precedence of 1905.)

- Central Government
  - Secretary to Government of India
  - Joint Secretary to Government of India
  - Deputy Secretary
  - Additional Deputy Secretary
  - Under Secretary
  - Assistant Secretary to Government of India
- State Government
  - Chief Secretary (British Empire)
  - Secretary to the State Government
  - Divisional Commissioner
  - Deputy Commissioner / District Collector
  - Assistant Commissioner
- Courts
  - Judge of the State High Court
  - District Judge

== Changes after 1912 ==
If a responsible government is to be established in India, there will be a far greater need than is even dreamt of at present for persons to take part in public affairs in the legislative assemblies and elsewhere and for this reason the more Indians we can employ in the public service the better. Moreover, it would lessen the burden of Imperial responsibilities if a body of capable Indian administrators could be produced.

— Regarding the importance of Indianising Civil Services, Montagu–Chelmsford Reforms

With the passing of the Government of India Act 1919, the Imperial Services headed by the Secretary of State for India, were split into two – All India Services and Central Services.

Before the First World War, 95% of ICS officers were Europeans; after the war, the British government faced growing difficulties in recruiting British candidates to the service. With fewer young British men interested in joining, mainly due to the decreased levels of compensation compared to other careers, and confronted with numerous vacancies, the government resorted to direct appointments; between 1915 and 1924, 80% of new British ICS appointees entered the service in this way. During the same period, 44% of new appointments to the ICS were filled by Indians.

In 1922, Indian candidates were permitted to sit for the ICS examinations in Delhi; in 1924, the Lee Commission, chaired by Arthur Lee, 1st Viscount Lee of Fareham (which eventually led to the foundation of the Federal Public Service Commission and Provincial Public Service Commission under the Government of India Act 1935) made several recommendations: ICS officers should receive increased and more comprehensive levels of compensation, future batches of ICS officers should be composed of 40% Europeans and 40% Indians with the remaining 20% of appointments to be filled by direct promotion of Indians from the Provincial Civil Services (PCS), and the examinations in Delhi and London were to produce an equal number of ICS probationers. In addition, under-representation of candidates from Indian minority groups (Muslims, Burmese and so on) would be corrected by direct appointments of qualified candidates from those groups, while British candidates would continue to have priority over Indians for ICS appointments. While initially successful, the expansion of the Indian independence movement from the late 1920s resulted in a hardening of Indian attitudes against European officers, and furthered distrust of Indian ICS appointments amongst Indians. This resulted in a declining recruitment base in terms of quality and quantity.

The All India and class 1 Central Services were designated as Central Superior Services as early as 1924. From 1924 to 1934, Administration in India consisted of "ten" All India Services and five central departments, all under the control of Secretary of State for India, and three central departments under joint Provincial and Imperial Control.

== After the Government of India Act 1935 ==
The finances of India under British rule depended largely on land taxes, and these became problematic in the 1930s. Epstein argues that after 1919, it became harder and harder to collect the land revenue. The suppression of civil disobedience by the British after 1934 temporarily increased the power of the revenue agents, but after 1937, they were forced by the new Congress-controlled provincial governments to hand back confiscated land. The outbreak of the Second World War strengthened them again, but in the face of the Quit India movement, the revenue collectors had to rely on military force, and by 1946–47, direct British control was rapidly disappearing in much of the countryside.

The outbreak of war in 1939 had immediate consequences for recruitment to the ICS. The examinations in London were suspended after that year's batch (12 British and eight Indian examinees) had qualified. In 1940 and 1941, 12 and four British candidates, respectively, were nominated to the ICS; the following year, the final London-nominated ICS candidates, both of whom were Indian, entered the service. Examinations continued to be held in Delhi for Indian candidates until 1943, when the last seven ICS officers (seven examinees, two nominated) joined. By this time, the British government felt it could no longer rely unambiguously on the complete loyalty of its Indian officers. During the period of the Interim Government of India (1946–1947), a few British candidates were given emergency appointments in the ICS, though ultimately none of them ever served in India.

== Partition of India, dissolution, and subsequent service of officers ==
At the time of the partition of India and departure of the British, in 1947, the Indian Civil Service was divided between the new Dominions of India and Pakistan. The part which went to India was named the Indian Administrative Service (IAS), while the part that went to Pakistan was named the "Civil Service of Pakistan" (CSP). In 1947, there were 980 ICS officers. 468 were Europeans, 352 Hindus, 101 Muslims, two depressed classes/Scheduled Castes, five domiciled Europeans and Anglo-Indians, 25 Indian Christians, 13 Parsis, 10 Sikhs, and four other communities. Many Hindus and Muslims went to India and Pakistan, respectively. This sudden loss of officer cadre caused major challenges in administering the nascent states.

Despite offers from the new Indian and Pakistani governments, virtually all of the European former ICS officers left following partition, with the majority of those who did not opt for retirement continuing their careers either in the British Home Civil Service or in another British colonial civil service. A few British ex-ICS officers stayed on over the ensuing quarter-century, notably those who had selected the "judicial side" of the ICS. The last British former ICS officer from the "judicial side" still serving in the subcontinent, Justice Donald Falshaw (ICS 1928), retired as Chief Justice of the Punjab High Court (now the Punjab and Haryana High Court) in May 1966, receiving a knighthood in the British 1967 New Year Honours upon his return to Britain. J. P. L. Gwynn (ICS 1939), the last former ICS officer holding British nationality and the last to serve in an executive capacity under the Indian government, ended his Indian service in 1968 as Second Member of the Board of Revenue, but continued to serve in the British Home Civil Service until his final retirement in 1976.

Justice William Broome (ICS 1932), a district and sessions judge at the time of independence in 1947, remained in Indian government service as a judge. Having married an Indian, Swarup Kumari Gaur, in 1937, with whom he raised a family, he eventually renounced his British citizenship in 1958 and became an Indian citizen with the personal intervention of Prime Minister Jawaharlal Nehru, himself a former barrister who regarded Broome as a distinguished jurist and as "much as Indian as anybody can be who is not born in India". Upon his retirement on 18 March 1972 from the Allahabad High Court as its most senior puisne judge, Broome was the last former ICS officer of European origin serving in India.

Nirmal Kumar Mukarji (ICS 1943), a member of the final batch recruited to the ICS, who retired as Cabinet Secretary in April 1980, was the last Indian administrative officer who had originally joined as an ICS. The last former ICS officer to retire, Aftab Ghulam Nabi Kazi (also a member of the final ICS batch of 1943), retired as Chairman of the Pakistan Board of Investment in 1994. The last living British ex-ICS officer, John Martin Fearn (1916–2014; ICS 1939), died in 2014 having retired as Secretary, Scottish Education Department in 1976. V. K. Rao (ICS 1937), the last living ICS officer to have joined the service in a regular pre-war intake, died in 2018. He was a retired Chief Secretary of Andhra Pradesh and was the oldest former ICS officer on record at the time of his death. V.M.M. Nair (ICS 1942) transferred to the Indian Political Service in 1946 and then to the Indian Foreign Service after independence, retiring in 1977 as Ambassador to Spain. At his death in 2021, he was the last surviving former Indian Civil Service officer.

== Criticism and support ==
If you take that steel frame out of the fabric, it will collapse. There is one institution we will not cripple, there is one institution we will not deprive of its functions or of its privileges; and that is the institution which built up the British Raj – the British Civil Service of India.

— David Lloyd George, then Prime Minister of the United Kingdom on the Imperial Civil Service

Dewey has commented that "in their heyday they [Indian Civil Service officers] were mostly run by Englishmen, with a few notable sons of Hindus and even fewer Muslims were the most powerful officials in the Empire, if not the world. A tiny cadre, a little over a thousand strong, ruled more than 300 million Indians. Each Civilian had an average of 300,000 subjects, and each Civilian penetrated every corner of his subjects' lives, because the Indian Civil Service directed all the activities of the Anglo-Indian state."

The ICS had responsibility for maintaining law and order, and often were at loggerheads with the independence activists during the Indian independence movement. Jawaharlal Nehru often ridiculed the ICS for its support of British policies. He noted that someone had once defined the Indian Civil Service, "with which we are unfortunately still afflicted in this country, as neither Indian, nor civil, nor a service". As Prime Minister, Nehru retained the organisation and its top people, albeit with a change of title to the "Indian Administrative Service". It continued its main roles. Nehru appointed long-time ICS officials Chintaman Deshmukh as his Finance Minister, and K. P. S. Menon as his Foreign Secretary. Sardar Patel appreciated their role in keeping India united after partition, and noted in Parliament that without them, the country would have collapsed.

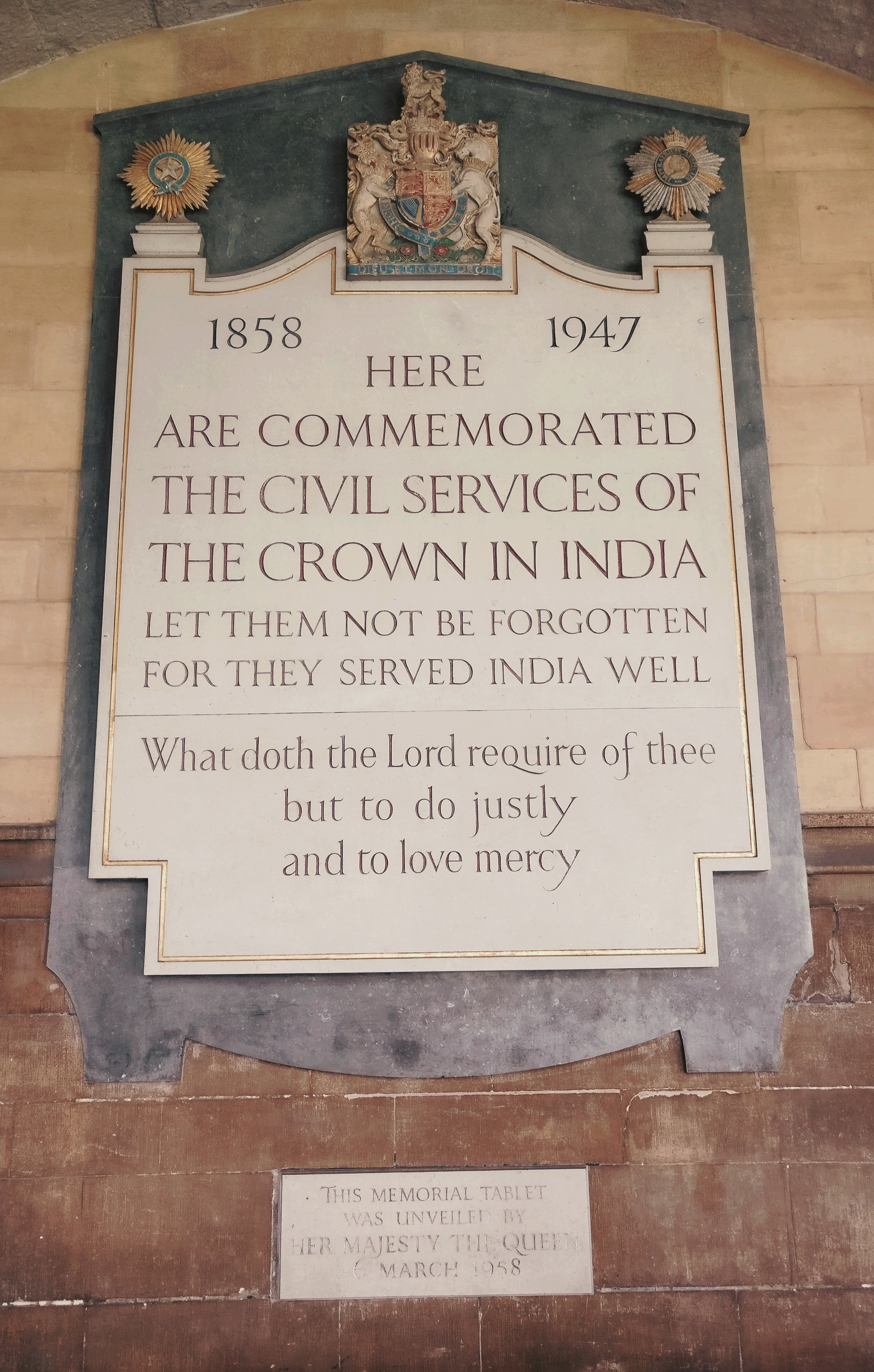
Commemoration of the Indian Civil Services at Westminster Abbey, London

== Members ==
At Independence, there were 980 ICS officers including 468 British, 352 Hindus, 101 Muslims, 25 Indian Christians, 13 Parsis, 10 Sikhs and 11 from other communities. ICS officers went to serve as Judges of the International Court of Justice (Note: B. N. Rau and Nagendra Singh), Prime Minister of Pakistan (Note: Chaudhri Muhammad Ali), 13 Cabinet Secretaries of India.

Many members were receipients of orders of chivalry namely - Order of the Indian Empire, Order of the British Empire, Order of the Star of India and Knight Bachelor. They were also awarded the title of honor Rai Bahadur.

=== Female members ===
No women were ever formally recruited into the ICS between 1858 and 1947. The service was exclusively male until its final years. Women were appointed only at the level of clerks (as typists and lowly clerical assistants), concentrated in the lower echelons of the uncovenanted civil service.

=== Notable members ===
K. K. Nayar played a crucial role in Ayodhya Ram Janmabhoomi dispute.

== See also ==
- List of Indian members of the Indian Civil Service
- List of Public service commissions in India
