= Deoria Lok Sabha constituency =

Lok Sabha constituency in Uttar Pradesh

Coordinates: 26.5°N 83.78°E

Deoria
- Lok Sabha constituency
- Interactive Map Outlining Deoria Lok Sabha constituency

Constituency details
- Country: India
- Region: North India
- State: Uttar Pradesh
- Assembly constituencies: Tamkuhi Raj; Fazilnagar; Deoria; Pathardeva; Rampur Karkhana
- Established: 1951
- Reservation: None

Member of Parliament
- 18th Lok Sabha
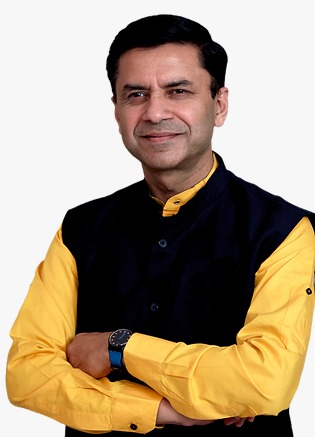
- Incumbent Shashank Mani Tripathi
- Party: Bharatiya Janata Party
- Elected year: 2024

Deoria is one of the 80 Lok Sabha (parliamentary) constituencies in Uttar Pradesh in India. It spreads across the districts of Deoria and Kushinagar

== Assembly segments ==
Presently, Deoria Lok Sabha constituency comprises five Vidhan Sabha (legislative assembly) segments. These are:

No	Name	District	Member	Party	2024 Lead
331	Tamkuhi Raj	Kushinagar	Asim Kumar	BJP	BJP
332	Fazilnagar	Kushinagar	Surendra Kushwaha	BJP	BJP
337	Deoria	Deoria	Shalabh Mani Tripathi	BJP	BJP
338	Pathardeva	Deoria	Surya Pratap Shahi	BJP	INC
339	Rampur Karkhana	Deoria	Surendra Chaurasia	BJP	INC

== Members of Parliament ==
Year	Member	Party
1951	Bishwanath Rai	Indian National Congress
1951	Sarju Prasad Misra	Indian National Congress
1951	Ram Ji Verma	Socialist Party
1957	Ram Ji Verma	Praja Socialist Party
1962	Bishwanath Rai	Indian National Congress
1967	Bishwanath Rai	Indian National Congress
1971	Bishwanath Rai	Indian National Congress
1977	Ugrasen Singh	Janata Party
1980	Ramayan Rai	Indian National Congress
1984	Raj Mangal Pandey	Indian National Congress
1989	Raj Mangal Pandey	Janata Dal
1991	Mohan Singh	Janata Dal
1996	Prakash Mani Tripathi	Bharatiya Janata Party
1998	Mohan Singh	Samajwadi Party
1999	Prakash Mani Tripathi	Bharatiya Janata Party
2004	Mohan Singh	Samajwadi Party
2009	Gorakh Prasad Jaiswal	Bahujan Samaj Party
2014	Kalraj Mishra	Bharatiya Janata Party
2019	Ramapati Ram Tripathi	Bharatiya Janata Party
2024	Shashank Mani Tripathi	Bharatiya Janata Party

== Election results ==
=== 2024 ===
2024 Indian general elections: Deoria
Party	Candidate	Votes	%	±%
BJP	Shashank Mani Tripathi	504,541	48.36	▼8.83
INC	Akhilesh Pratap Singh	4,69,699	45.02	▲39.99
BSP	Sandesh	45,564	4.37	▼28.20
NOTA	None of the Above	10,212	0.98	▼0.34
Majority		34,842	3.34	▼21.28
Turnout		10,43,308	55.68	▼2.22
BJP hold		Swing		

=== 2019 ===
2019 Indian general elections: Deoria
Party	Candidate	Votes	%	±%
BJP	Ramapati Ram Tripathi	580,644	57.19	
BSP	Binod Kumar Jaiswal	3,30,713	32.57	
INC	Niyaz Ahmad Khan	51,056	5.03	
NOTA	None of the Above	13,421	1.32	
Majority		2,49,931	24.62	
Turnout		10,15,596	57.90	+4.10
BJP hold		Swing		

=== 2014 results ===
2014 Indian general elections: Deoria
Party	Candidate	Votes	%	±%
BJP	Kalraj Mishra	4,96,500	51.07	+26.18
BSP	Niyaz Ahamed	2,31,114	23.77	−6.96
SP	Baleshwar Yadav	1,50,852	15.52	−5.64
INC	Sabha Kunwar	37,752	3.88	−8.91
BED	Ram Pravesh	6,408	0.66	+0.66
NOTA	None of the Above	12,405	1.28	+1.28
Majority		2,65,386	27.30	+21.46
Turnout		9,72,160	53.80	+8.40
BJP gain from BSP		Swing	+20.34	

=== 2009 results ===
2009 Indian general elections: Deoria
Party	Candidate	Votes	%	±%
BSP	Gorakh Prasad Jaiswal	2,19,889	30.73	
BJP	Prakash Mani Tripathi	1,78,110	24.89	
SP	Mohan Singh	1,51,389	21.16	
INC	Baleshwar Yadav	91,488	12.79	
PECP	Safayat Ali	28,841	4.03	
Majority		41,779	5.84	
Turnout		7,17,625	45.40	
BSP gain from SP		Swing		

== See also ==
- Deoria district
- List of constituencies of the Lok Sabha
