= Kamlesh Shukla =

Indian politician (1952–2026)

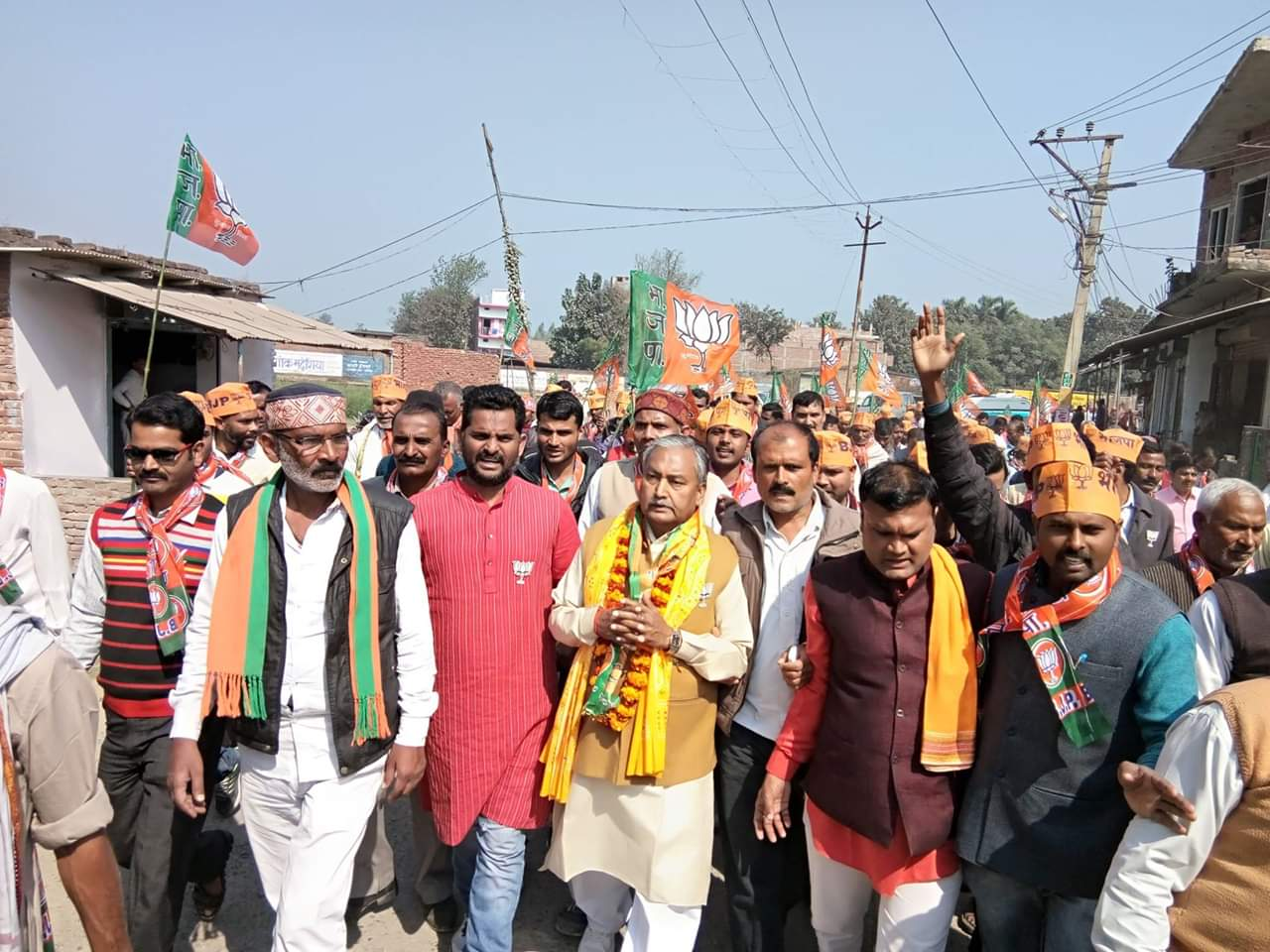

MLA, 17th Legislative Assembly of Uttar Pradesh
- In office March 2017 – March 2022
- Preceded by: Choudhari Fasiha Bashir Alias Gajala Lari
- Succeeded by: Surendra Chaurasia
- Constituency: Rampur Karkhana Assembly constituency

Personal details
- Born: 8 October 1952 Deoria, Uttar Pradesh, India
- Died: 10 January 2026 (aged 73) Rudrapur, Uttarakhand, India
- Cause of death: Cardiac arrest
- Party: Bharatiya Janata Party
- Spouse: Tara Devi
- Children: 4
- Parent: Ramnaresh Shukla
- Profession: Politician

Kamlesh Shukla (8 October 1952 – 10 January 2026) was an Indian politician who was a member of 17th Legislative Assembly of Uttar Pradesh of India. He represented the Rampur Karkhana Assembly constituency in Deoria district of Uttar Pradesh and was a member of the Bhartiya Janata Party.

== Early life and education ==
Shukla was born on 8 October 1952 in Deoria, Uttar Pradesh to his father Ramnaresh Shukla. He married Tara Devi, they had three sons and one daughter. He belonged to Brahman family. He had 8th Passed from Aditya Nath Jha Inter College, Rudrapur.

== Political career ==
Shukla was MLA for one term. Between 2017 and 2022, he represented Rampur Karkhana constituency as a member of Bhartiya Janata Party. He defeated Samajwadi Party candidate Fasiha Manzer Ghazala Lari by a margin of 9,987 votes.

== Illness and death ==
Shukla suffered from long term illness for many years, reportedly during his term as an MLA. He died of a cardiac arrest at a hospital in Rudrapur on 10 January 2026 at the age of 73, where he was undergoing treatment.

== Posts held ==
#	From	To	Position	Comments
01	March 2017	March 2022	Member, 17th Legislative Assembly of Uttar Pradesh	
