= Deoria Assembly constituency =

Constituency of the Uttar Pradesh legislative assembly in India

Coordinates: 26.50°N 83.78°E

Deoria
- Constituency No. 337 for the Uttar Pradesh Legislative Assembly

Constituency details
- Country: India
- Region: North India
- State: Uttar Pradesh
- District: Deoria
- Reservation: None

Member of Legislative Assembly
- 18th Uttar Pradesh Legislative Assembly
- Incumbent Shalabh Mani Tripathi
- Party: Bharatiya Janta Party
- Elected year: 2022

Deoria is a constituency of the Uttar Pradesh Legislative Assembly covering the city of Deoria in the Deoria district of Uttar Pradesh, India. This seat was known as Deoria North assembly from 1952 to 1967. In 1967, this seat was changed to Deoria.

Deoria is one of five assembly constituencies in the Deoria Lok Sabha constituency. Since 2008, this assembly constituency is numbered 337 amongst 403 constituencies.

== Members of Legislative Assembly ==
Year	Member	Party
1967	Mohammad Farooq Chishti	Indian National Congress
1969	Deep Narain Mani	Bharatiya Kranti Dal
1974	Krishna Rai	Bharatiya Kranti Dal
1977	Krishna Rai	Janata Party
1980	Rudra Pratap	Janata Party (Secular)
1985	Fajale Masood	Indian National Congress
1989	Ram Chhabila Mishra	Janata Dal
1991	Ravindra Pratap Mall	Bharatiya Janata Party
1993	Ravindra Pratap Mall	Bharatiya Janata Party
1996	Subash Chandra Srivastav	Janata Dal
2002	Dinanath Kushwaha	National Loktantrik Party
2007	Dinanath Kushwaha	Samajwadi Party
2012	Janmejay Singh	Bharatiya Janata Party
2017	Janmejay Singh	Bharatiya Janata Party
2020^	Satya Prakash Mani Tripathi	Bharatiya Janata Party
2022	Shalabh Mani Tripathi	Bharatiya Janata Party

== Election results ==
=== 2027 ===
2027 Uttar Pradesh Legislative Assembly election: Deoria
Party	Candidate	Votes	%	±%
INDIA				
NDA				
BSP				
NOTA	None of the above			
Majority				
Turnout				
gain from		Swing		

=== 2022 ===
General Election 2022: Deoria
Party	Candidate	Votes	%	±%
BJP	Shalabh Mani Tripathi	106,701	53.52	▲5.49
SP	Ajay Pratap Singh alias Pinto	66,046	33.13	▲10.33
BSP	Ramsaran	17,893	8.98	▼6.96
INC	Purooshottam Narain Singh	2,708	1.36	
NOTA	None of the above	1,285	0.64	▼0.15
Majority		40,655	20.39	▼4.84
Turnout		199,352	56.69	▲0.16
BJP hold		Swing		

=== 2017 ===
Bharatiya Janta Party candidate Satya Prakash Mani Tripathi won in last by election of 2020 Uttar Pradesh Legislative by elections defeating Samajwadi Party candidate B.S. Tripathi by a margin of around 20,000 votes.

2017 Uttar Pradesh Legislative Assembly election: Deoria
Party	Candidate	Votes	%	±%
BJP	Janmejai Singh	88,030	48.03	
SP	J.P. Jaiswal	41,794	22.8	
BSP	Abhay Nath Tripathi	29,218	15.94	
PECP	Vijay Pratap Yadav	12,696	6.93	
CPI	Rakesh Kumar Pathak	1,791	0.98	
Independent	Bakridan	1,737	0.95	
NOTA	None of the above	1,440	0.79	
Majority		46,236	25.23	
Turnout		183,289	56.53	

== See also ==
- Deoria
- Deoria district
- Deoria Lok Sabha constituency
