= Ramapati Ram Tripathi =

Indian politician

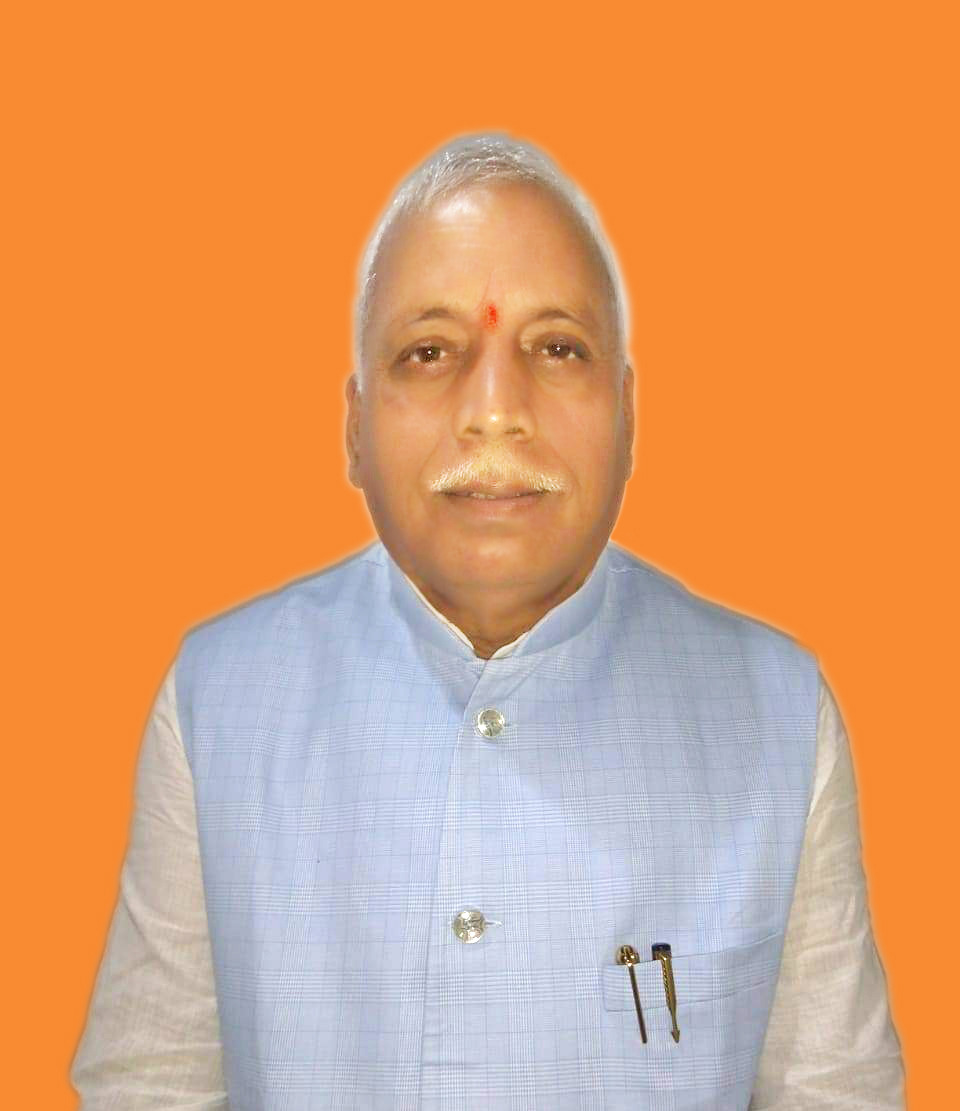

Member of Parliament, Lok Sabha
- In office 23 May 2019 – June 2024
- Preceded by: Kalraj Mishra
- Succeeded by: Shashank Mani Tripathi
- Constituency: Deoria

President of Bharatiya Janata Party, Uttar Pradesh
- In office 3 September 2007 – 12 May 2010
- Preceded by: Keshari Nath Tripathi
- Succeeded by: Surya Pratap Shahi

Member of Uttar Pradesh Legislative Council
- In office 6 May 2000 – 5 May 2012
- Constituency: elected by Legislative Assembly members

Personal details
- Born: 14 November 1950 (age 75) Gorakhpur, Uttar Pradesh, India
- Party: Bharatiya Janata Party
- Spouse: Smt. Arundhati Tripathi
- Children: 5, including Sharad
- Profession: Politician, physician

Dr Ramapati Ram Tripathi (born 14 November 1950) is the 17th Lok Sabha Member of Parliament in 2019 elections, he won the election from the Deoria seat of Uttar Pradesh, Dr Ramapati Ram Tripathi is a former president of Bharatiya Janata Party Uttar Pradesh state unit in India. He held the post of UP BJP General Secretary before being appointed as BJP's UP chief in September 2007.

== Early life ==
Dr Ramapati Ram Tripathi was born on 14 November 1951 in "Jhudia" village of Gorakhpur district, Uttar Pradesh. His father was late Shri Hansraj Tripathi and his mother was late Smt. Laldei Tripathi. He was born into a family of farmers, and has completed their early education from in Jhudia Village of Gorakhpur district of Uttar Pradesh, India. After completing his BSc from Mahatma Gandhi P.G. College, Gorakhpur moved for further studies and Graduated in Ayurvedic Medicine and Surgery from SNYA Medical College, Bhagalpur, Bihar in 1971–77. He was a brilliant student and an active Rashtriya Swayamsevak Sangh (RSS) worker since his academics and was involved political and social activity. Dr Tripathi is considered a grassroots leader and he is considered to be such a leader who also maintained a close relationship with the leaders and workers up to the panchayat.

== Political career ==
Dr Ramapati Ram Tripathi political career started with Students Union and was also elected as the General Secretary of the Students Union of Mahatma Gandhi Post Graduate College, Gorakhpur in 1969. He then moved to Bhagalpur district Bihar to complete his further studies Bachelor of Ayurvedic Medicine and Surgery. At the same time, he participated in the 1974 J P movement which was against Smt Indra Gandhi. In 1975 Dr Tripathi was detained by Indira Gandhi during the imposition of emergency. After that, in 1978, he was appointed President of Bharatiya Janata Yuva Morcha (BJYM) Gorakhpur district. BJYM believes in all core ideologies of the BJP. He served BJP Gorakhpur District President on 1984 to 1989. And he also served General Secretary of Bhartiya Janta Party Uttar Pradesh from 1995 to 2007 period. After that, in 2007, he held the position of Uttar PradeshBJP President from 2007 to 2010. In period 2010 to 2012 he held the position of BJP Co charge of Maharastra State. After that in 2012 to 2014 he held the position of BJP in charge of Jharkhand state. And from 2014 to till date he is a member of BJP up election management. And he also seventeenth Lok Sabha Member of Parliament in the 2019 elections, he has been elected from the Deoria seat of Uttar Pradesh. Dr Ramapati Ram Tripathi is a former president of Bharatiya Janata Party Uttar Pradesh state unit in India.[1] He was a member of Uttar Pradesh Legislative Council.
