= Dinanath Kushwaha =

Indian politician from Uttar Pradesh (b. 1955)

Member of Uttar Pradesh Legislative Assembly
- In office 2002–2012
- Constituency: Deoria Assembly constituency

Personal details
- Born: 4 April 1955 (age 71) Deoria district, Uttar Pradesh
- Party: Samajwadi Party
- Spouse: Vimlavati Devi

Dinanath Kushwaha is an Indian politician based in Uttar Pradesh, who served as member of Uttar Pradesh Legislative Assembly twice. He was elected to Uttar Pradesh Legislative Assembly in 2002 on the symbol of National Loktantrik Party. In 2007, he was re-elected to Uttar Pradesh Legislative Assembly, but this time, as a candidate of Samajwadi Party. Kushwaha represented Deoria Assembly constituency in Uttar Pradesh Legislature.

== Life and political career ==
Dinanath Kushwaha was born to Nageswar Kushwaha on 4 April 1955 in Lahilapar (Ratanpura) village of Uttar Pradesh. After completing his bachelor's degree and another degree in bachelor of education, he got married on 21 May 1977 to Vimlavati Devi. They had one son and four daughters from this marriage. Prior to involving in active politics, he worked as an agriculturist. He started his political career from National Loktantrik Party and contested the 2002 Uttar Pradesh Legislative Assembly elections. He was elected for the Uttar Pradesh Legislative Assembly for the first time through these elections from Deoria Assembly constituency.

In April-May 2007, he ran for the assembly elections for the second time, after completing his first term as M.L.A. He was victorious again in this election. Kushwaha had contested on the Symbol of Samajwadi Party this time. In 1980, he was charged under section 151 of Indian Penal Code due to his activism and was imprisoned in district prison of Deoria. In his second tenure, in 2007-08, he also served as a member of Public Accounts Committee of Uttar Pradesh Legislative Assembly. In 2007 Assembly elections, he defeated Shri Kamlesh of Bahujan Samaj Party.
