= GIC Deoria =

Government Inter College (GIC)
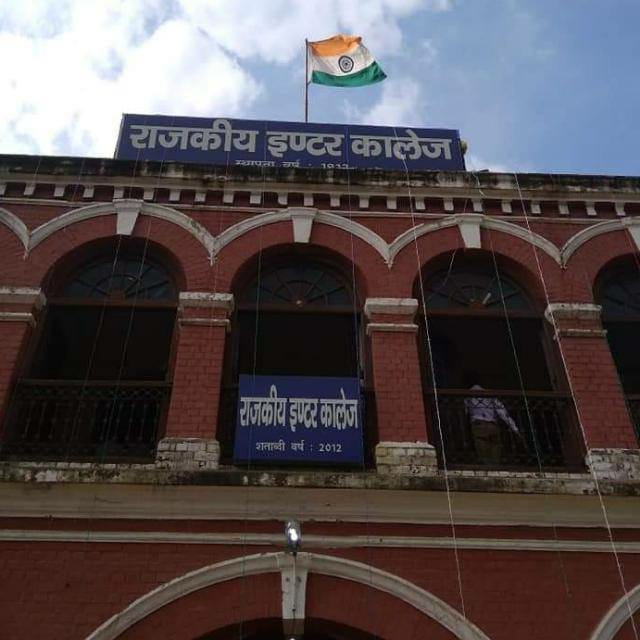

Location
- Government Inter College; Kotwali Road; Deoria, Uttar Pradesh; India
- Coordinates: 26.50047°N 83.78345°E

Information
- Other name: King Edward High School
- Type: Government College
- Motto: विद्या ददाति विनयम् (Education Makes one Humble)
- Established: October 8, 1912; 113 years ago
- Founder: King Edward
- Status: Active
- School board: U.P. Board
- School code: 1049
- Principal: Ram Kinkar (PES)
- Teaching staff: ~40
- Age range: 9 to 18 years
- Enrollment: 1000 +
- Classes: VI to XII
- Average class size: 60
- Education system: Secondary school
- Language: Hindi, English
- Hours in school day: 9
- Classrooms: 30+
- Campus: Urban
- Campus size: 2.09 acres
- Colours: Maroon and white
- Nickname: GIC
- Affiliation: U.P. Board

Government Inter College Deoria or GIC Deoria is a college in the Deoria district, Uttar Pradesh, India. Established in 1912 as King Edward High School, the school provides a common education programme for the children of central government, defence, and military personnel.

It is 2 km (1.2 mi) away from the Deoria Railway Station and 2.9 km (1.8 mi) away from the Deoria Bus Stand. The old name of this college was King Edward High School. It was established on 8 October 1912.

Its current principal is Ram Kinkar. There are hostels here and there is also two bicycle stands.

== Admission ==
Selection is made through written entrance test in English, Hindi and Math & Biology followed by an interview.

== Students and faculty ==
The students strength of the school is 4000. Total number of teachers are 50. There are 20 classrooms in college me of old students of this college are serving this college as a teacher, when they are selected as teacher by Madhya Shiksha Seva Chayan Board, Allahabad. Some of these teachers are Shri Govind Singh (Lecturer-Physics), YogendraNath Mishra (Lecturer-Hindi), Ashim Chaudhary (Lecturer-Mathematics), Vivekanand Mishra (Lecturer-Chemistry) etc.

== Course of study ==
The college follows the curriculum prescribed by the Madhyamik Shiksha Parishad, Uttar Pradesh (UP Board) and have classes from Primary (VI) to the Intermediate (Class XII) level. It prepares students for the UP Board Examination for Class X and Class XII. Value education is imparted as part of the curriculum.

School hours are from 7:00 am to 12:00 pm stared 1st shift.1st shirt in 11th,12th and 2nd shirt 6th to 10th. 12:00 pm to 5:pm started 2nd Shirt. The Office functions from 10:00 am to 5:00 pm.

== Celebrating Annual Function ==
GIC Deoria celebrates its foundation day on 8 October every year. On this day, all the students of Deoria, that is, those who have left after studying, all those people are called and honored. Due to COVID-19, it was stopped in GIC for 2 years i.e. 2019 and 2020. But it will be celebrated again in 2021.

== Gallery ==
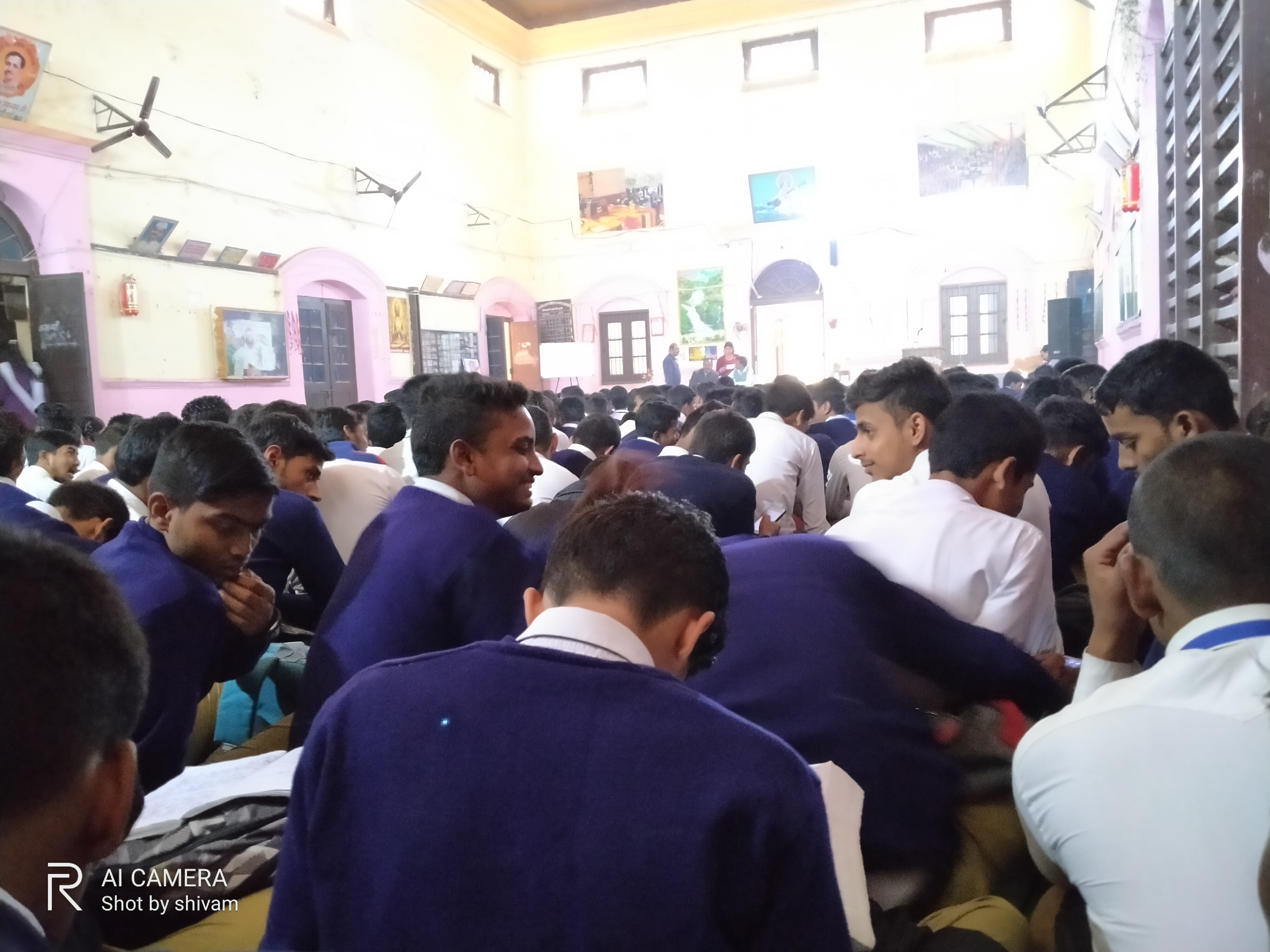
Hall Image

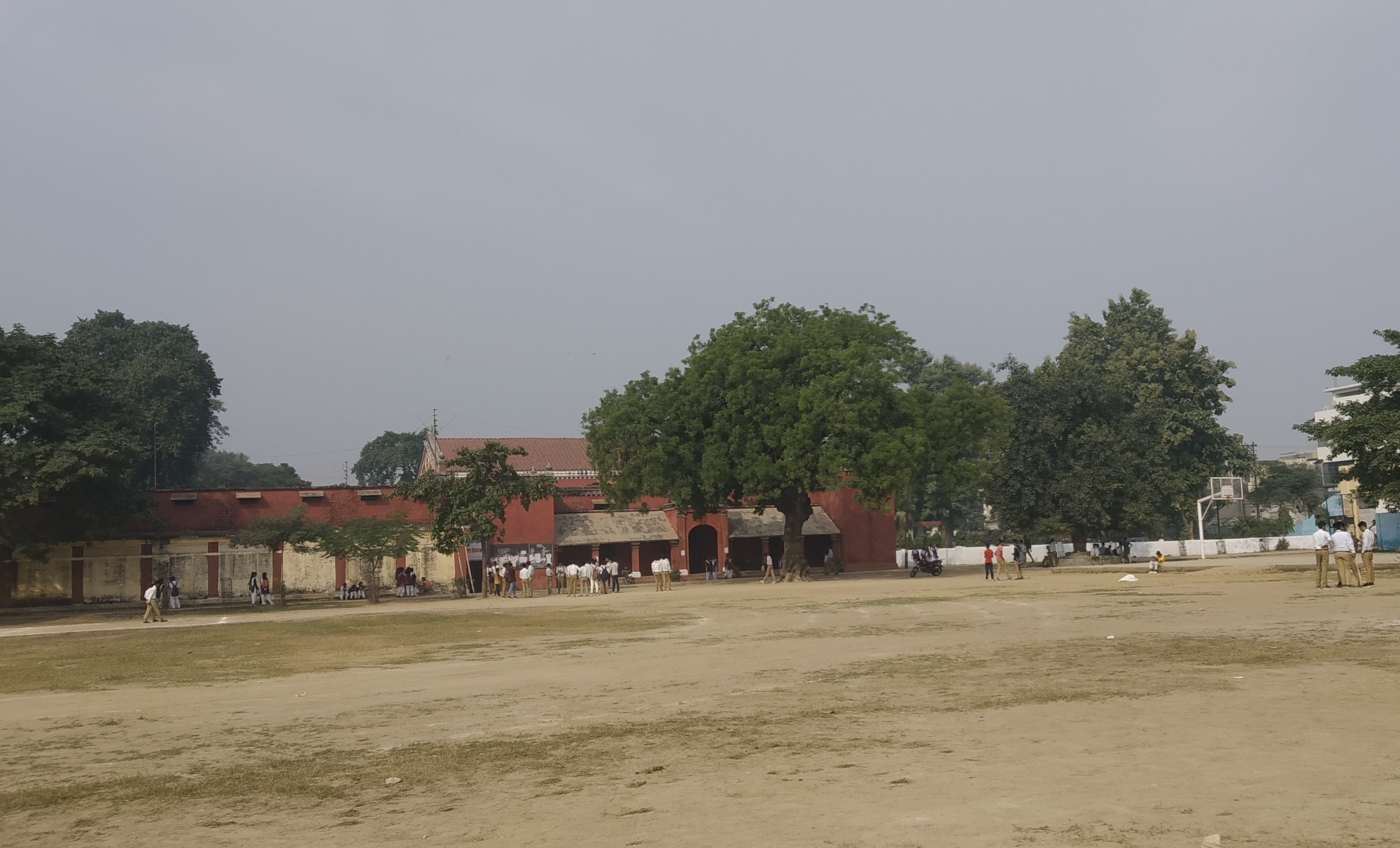
Ground Image 1

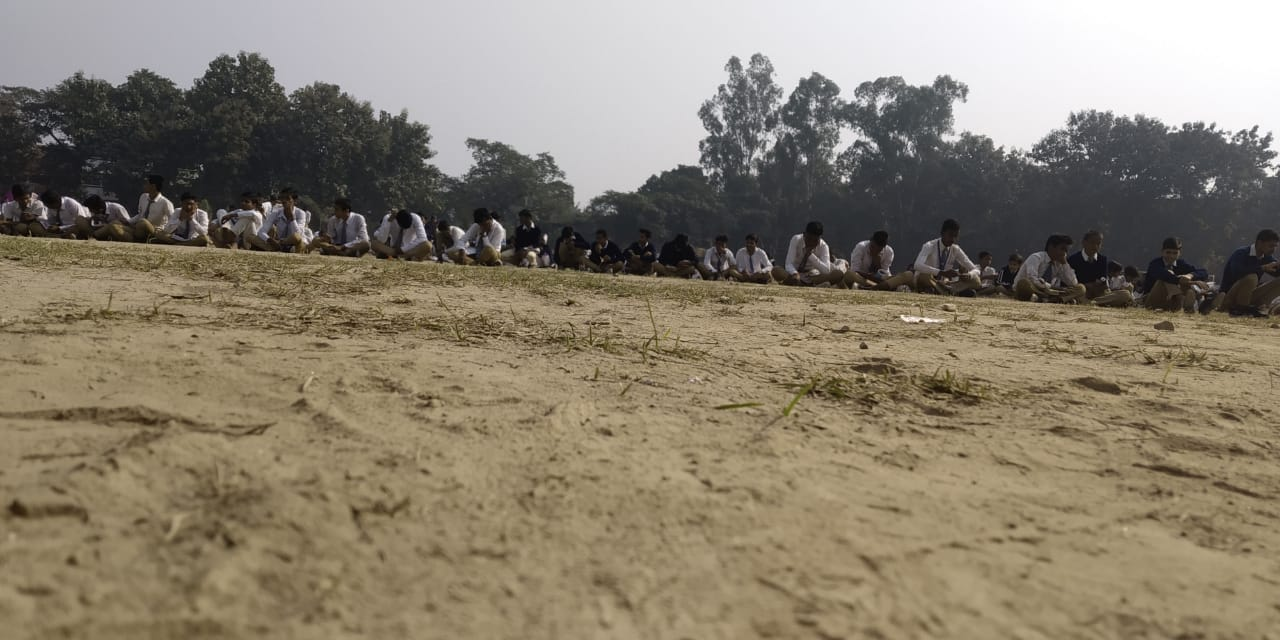
Ground Image 2

== Notable alumni ==
- Surya Pratap Shahi Cabinet Minister in Uttar Pradesh
- Girishwar Misra Former Vice Chancellor Mahatma Gandhi Antarrashtriya Hindi Vishwavidyalaya, author, professor, psychologist

== See also ==
- Deoria
- Deoria district
- UP Board
- List of schools in India
