= Surya Pratap Sharma =

Indian arm wrestler (born 1994)

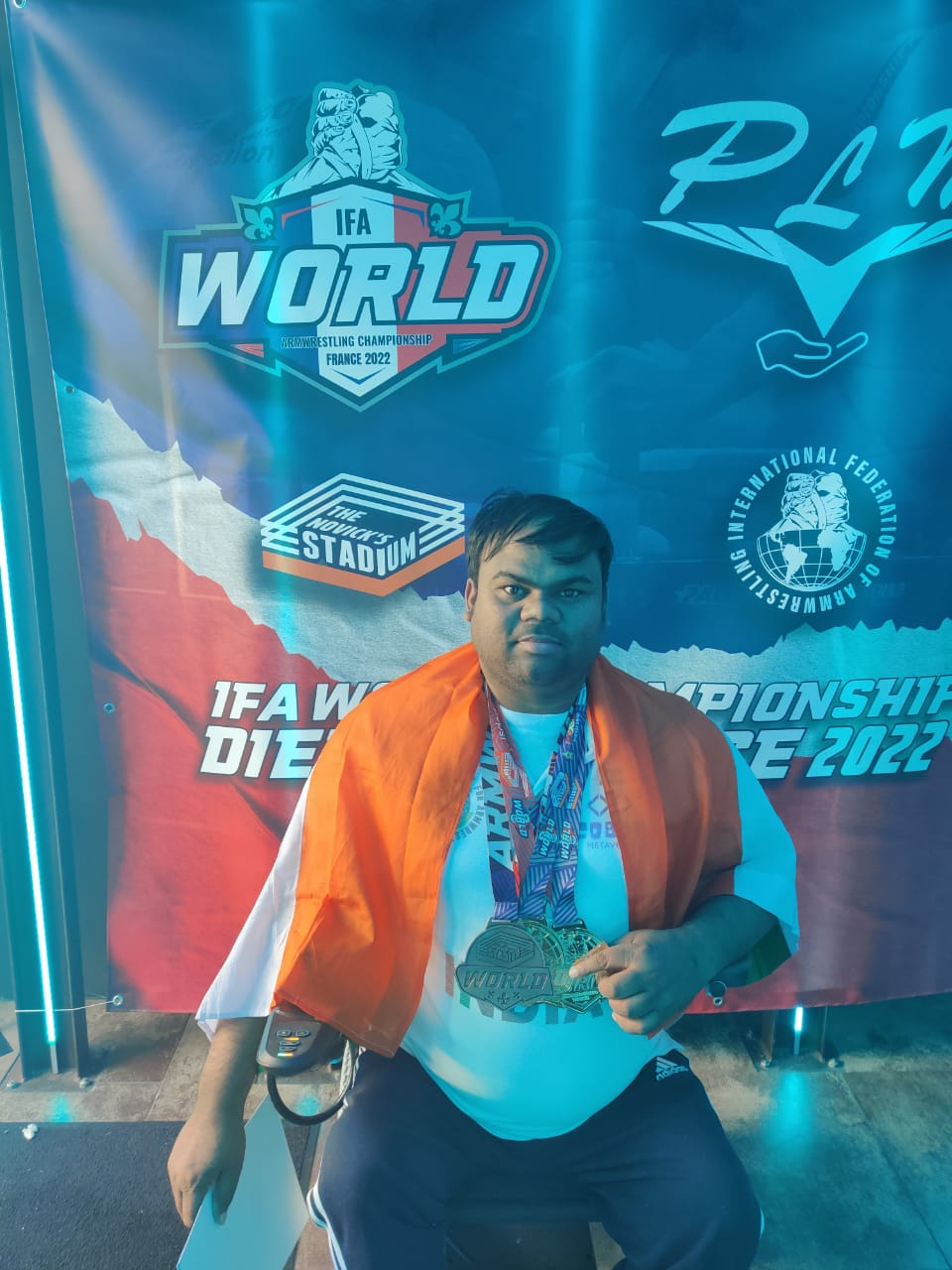
- Surya in IFA world championships 2022

Personal information
- Native name: Surya
- Full name: Surya Pratap Sharma
- Born: 15 January 1994 (age 32) Deoria, Uttar Pradesh, India
- Height: 5 ft 4 in (163 cm)
- Weight: 86 kg (190 lb)

Sport
- Country: India
- Sport: Arm wrestling
- College team: Rocky
- Coached by: Sukhdeep Singh Randhawa
Medal record
1st Gold Medal Champion Delhi, Talkatora in 2014
1st Gold Medal Champion Delhi, Khelgaw in 2015-16
Bronze Medal Champion Nagpur in 2016
World Championship in Bulgariya (Europe) World Rank- 4
World Championship in Hungary (Europe) World Rank- 5
World Cup Championship Poland (Romia) Silver & Bronze Medal 2017
XIII State Arm Wrestling Championship in Agra Gold Medal- 2019
43rd National Arm Wrestling Championship in Punjab Bronze Medal- 2019
1st BCAI National Arm Wrestling Championship in Delhi Gold & Silver Medal- 2019
2nd BCAI National Arm Wrestling Championship in Goa two Gold Medal- 2022
IFA World Arm Wrestling Championship France in Dieppe two Gold Medal (Left & Right) in 2022
IFA World Arm Wrestling Championship France in Dieppe two Bronze Medal (Left & Right) in 2022
IFA World Arm Wrestling Championship Kuala Lumpur, Malaysia one Gold Medal (Right) in 2023
IFA World Arm Wrestling Championship Kuala Lumpur, Malaysia one Silver Medal (Left) in 2023

Surya Pratap Sharma is an Indian arm wrestler. He had won silver and bronze medal at the World Cup Championship Poland (Romania) in the year 2017.

== Early life and education ==
Surya was born in Muradih village of Deoria district in Uttar Pradesh. He grew up in this village. His father was a Staff Commissioner in Ganna Sansthan. He became disabled due to polio when he was just one and a half years old. Surya pursued M.B.A from Dr. Shakuntala Mishra National Rehabilitation University, Lucknow. His interest in the Arm Wrestling was developed during an arm wrestling competition held in K.K.C, Lucknow. He practiced further in this field and became a winner of the State Championship in 2013 after defeating 110 people in arm wrestling. Later, he won several national level championships such as National Arm Wrestling Championship in Delhi, Talkatora in 2014 with a gold medal.

== Wins ==
- World Championship in Bulgariya (Europe) World Rank- 4
- World Cup Championship Poland (Romia) Silver & Bronze Medal 2017
