= Ramayan Rai =

Indian politician (born 1932)

Member of Parliament, Lok Sabha
- In office 1980–1984
- Preceded by: Ugrasen
- Succeeded by: Raj Mangal Pandey
- Constituency: Deoria, Uttar Pradesh

Personal details
- Born: 30 May 1932
- Party: Indian National Congress

Ramayan Rai (born 30 May 1932) is an Indian politician. He was elected to the Lok Sabha, the lower house of the Parliament of India from the Deoria constituency of Uttar Pradesh as a member of the Indian National Congress.
