= Prakash Mani Tripathi =

Indian politician (1935–2026)

Lieutenant General Prakash Mani Tripathi प्रकाश मणि त्रिपाठी

Member of Parliament, Lok Sabha
- In office 1999–2004
- Preceded by: Mohan Singh
- Succeeded by: Mohan Singh
- In office 1996–1998
- Preceded by: Mohan Singh
- Succeeded by: Mohan Singh
- Constituency: Deoria

Personal details
- Born: 30 June 1935 Bapar, Deoria district, United Provinces of Agra of Oudh, British India
- Died: 8 November 2026 (aged 91) Delhi, India
- Party: Bharatiya Janata Party
- Spouse: Shashi Tripathi (m. 1960)
- Children: Shashank Mani Two Sons, One Daughter
- Education: M. Sc. (Defence Studies)
- Profession: Military Service, Agriculturist and Politician

Lieutenant General Shri Prakash Mani Tripathi (30 June 1935 – 8 November 2026) was an Indian politician who was a member of Lok Sabha from Deoria parliamentary constituency.

Tripathi was commissioned in the Indian Army in June 1955 and served in Jammu and Kashmir. He joined 63 Cavalry in February 1957; served in Nagaland as Squadron Commander between 1964 and 1965. During the Indo-Pak War, 1971, he fought in Bangladesh.

He took part in Mizoram-Counter Insurgency operations in 1976; was Commander 3 (I) Armoured Brigade in 1982; Maj. General Officer Commanding, Armoured Division between 1985 and 1988; Director-General, Combat Vehicles, D.R.D.O., between 1988 and 1990; G.O.C. 2 Corps, 1990–92 and Deputy Chief of Army Staff between 1992 and 1993. He was awarded the Ati Vishisht Seva Medal in 1986 and Param Vishisht Seva Medal in 1992.

Tripathi was a member of the 11th Lok Sabha (1996-1998) and 13th Lok Sabha, representing Deoria constituency.

Tripathi died on 8 November 2026, at the age of 91.
