= Shashank Mani =

Indian politician

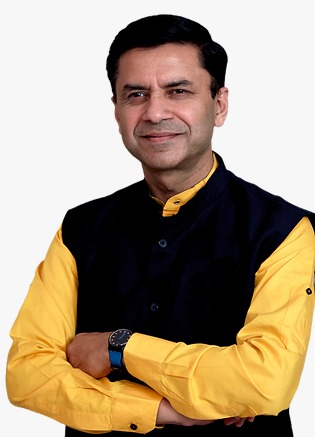

Member of Parliament, Lok Sabha
- Incumbent
- Assumed office 9 June 2024
- Preceded by: Ramapati Ram Tripathi
- Constituency: Deoria

Personal details
- Born: Shashank Mani Tripathi; 25 July 1969 (age 57) Deoria, Uttar Pradesh, India
- Party: Bharatiya Janata Party
- Spouse: Gauri Tripathi
- Children: 2 daughters
- Parent: Prakash Mani Tripathi (father)
- Education: IIT Delhi; International Institute for Management Development
- Profession: Politician, author, businessman
- Website: Official Website

Shashank Mani Tripathi (born 25 July 1969) is an Indian politician and a Member of Parliament from the Bharatiya Janata Party in the 18th Lok Sabha. He was elected from the constituency of Deoria in the state of Uttar Pradesh. He is founder of Jagriti Yatra and Jagriti Enterprise Centre – Purvanchal (JECP). He is the son of Former Deoria MP Prakash Mani Tripathi.

== Early life and education ==
Mani's initial education was at Colvin Taluqdars’ College (Lucknow), where he won the Jahangirabad gold medal in sports and athletics. He later enrolled in the Indian Institute of Technology Delhi, where he was the deputy general secretary for sports activity boards. Under his leadership, IIT Delhi became victorious in the inaugural Inter IIT Sports Annual Competition.

== Career ==
Shashank Mani is the founder of the Jagriti Yatra and the Jagriti Enterprise Centre - Purvanchal (JECP). He is BJP Candidate for Loksabha election 2024 from Deoria Constituency.
