= Surya Pratap Shahi =

Indian politician

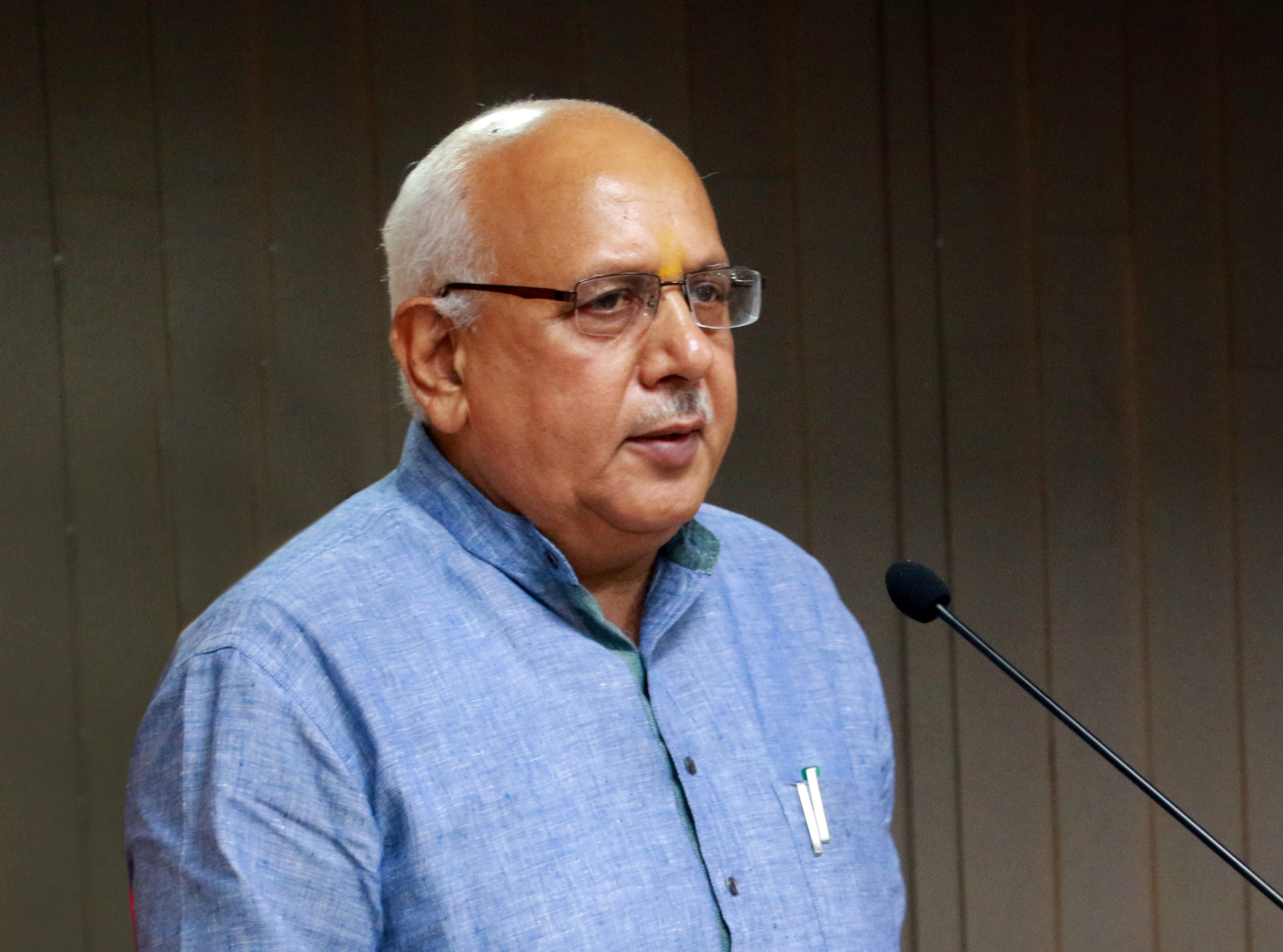

Minister of Agriculture Government of Uttar Pradesh
- Incumbent
- Assumed office 19 March 2017
- Chief Minister: Yogi Adityanath

President of Bharatiya Janata Party, Uttar Pradesh
- In office 12 May 2010 – 13 April 2012
- Preceded by: Ramapati Ram Tripathi
- Succeeded by: Laxmikant Bajpai

Minister of Excise & Liquor Prohibition Government of Uttar Pradesh
- In office 21 September 1997 – 8 March 2002
- Chief Minister: Mayawati; Kalyan Singh; Ram Prakash Gupta; Rajnath Singh

Minister of state for Home Affairs Government of Uttar Pradesh
- In office 24 June 1991 – 6 December 1992
- Chief Minister: Kalyan Singh

Member of Uttar Pradesh Legislative Assembly
- Incumbent
- Assumed office 11 March 2017
- Preceded by: Shakir Ali
- Constituency: Pathardeva
- In office 1996–2002
- Preceded by: Brahma Shankar Tripathi
- Succeeded by: Brahma Shankar Tripathi
- Constituency: Kasia
- In office 1991–1992
- Preceded by: Brahma Shankar Tripathi
- Succeeded by: Brahma Shankar Tripathi
- Constituency: Kasia
- In office 1985–1989
- Preceded by: Raj Mangal Pandey
- Succeeded by: Brahma Shankar Tripathi
- Constituency: Kasia

Personal details
- Born: 23 December 1952 (age 73) Deoria, Uttar Pradesh, India
- Party: Bharatiya Janata Party
- Spouse: Rani Shahi (m. 1973)
- Parents: Rajendra Kishor Shahi (father); Ram Pyari Devi (mother)
- Education: Banaras Hindu University
- Occupation: Agriculture, Advocate

Surya Pratap Shahi (born 23 December 1952) is an Indian politician. He is a Member of 9th, 11th, 13th, 17th Legislative Assembly of Uttar Pradesh and 18th Uttar Pradesh Assembly. Currently he is serving as Cabinet Minister in Uttar Pradesh Government with the portfolio of Agriculture, Agriculture Education and Agriculture Research. He has worked as the president of Uttar Pradesh state unit in the past. He is one of those distinguished BJP leaders who won election in 1985 despite sympathy wave after assassination of Indira Gandhi in 1984.

== Early life ==
Shahi was born on 23 December 1952 in Pakahan Village of Deoria district of Uttar Pradesh, India. He got his early education from GIC Deoria. He completed his graduation from B.R.D. Post Graduate College. Shahi got his LLB degree from Banaras Hindu University, Varanasi in 1974. His father Rajendra Kishor Shahi was District Sanchalak of Rashtriya Swayamsevak Sangh (RSS), who introduced him to the RSS at a very early age. Shahi was politically active since his student days. He contested and won the election of the student union in BHU. His uncle Ravindra Kishor Shahi was State President of Bhartiya Jana Sangh and a minister in the Uttar Pradesh government from 1977 to 1979. Shahi was married in 1973 to Rani Shahi. He has three children- a son and two daughters.

== Political career ==
Shahi contested the assembly election of Uttar Pradesh for first time in the year 1980. However, he got elected for first time as MLA from the 'Kasia' assembly seat in 1985. Second time he won the election was in 1991 and became the Minister of State for Home in the Uttar Pradesh government. After completing one year in the government he was elevated to the position of Cabinet Minister with the portfolio of Health and Family Welfare. In the year 1996, he again got elected as MLA. Surya Pratap Shahi held the office of Cabinet Minister in Uttar Pradesh government between 1997 and 2002 with the portfolio of Excise and Liquor Prohibition and currently he is a cabinet minister in Uttar Pradesh Government with the portfolio of Agriculture, Agriculture Education and Agriculture Research.

== Posts held ==
| # | From | To | Position | Comments 2 ||March 2022 || till date || Cabinet Minister for Agriculture, Agriculture Education and Agriculture Research || |
|---|---|---|---|---|
| 1 | March 2022 | Incumbent | Member, 18th Uttar Pradesh Assembly | |
| 2 | March 2017 | March 2022 | Cabinet Minister for Agriculture, Agriculture Education and Agriculture Research | |
| 3 | March 2017 | March 2022 | Member, 17th Legislative Assembly of Uttar Pradesh | |
| 4 | September 1997 | March 2002 | Cabinet Minister for Excise and Liquor Prohibition | |
| 5 | October 1996 | March 2002 | Member, 13th Legislative Assembly of Uttar Pradesh | |
| 6 | June 1991 | December 1992 | Cabinet Minister for Health and Family Welfare | |
| 7 | June 1991 | December 1992 | Member, 11th Legislative Assembly of Uttar Pradesh | |
| 8 | March 1985 | November 1989 | Member, 9th Legislative Assembly of Uttar Pradesh | |
