= Rampur Karkhana Assembly constituency =

Constituency of the Uttar Pradesh legislative assembly in India

Coordinates: 26.57°N 83.82°E

339 Rampur Karkhana
- Constituency No. 339 for the Uttar Pradesh Legislative Assembly

Constituency details
- Country: India
- Region: North India
- State: Uttar Pradesh
- District: Deoria
- Total electors: 3,56,278
- Reservation: None

Member of Legislative Assembly
- 18th Uttar Pradesh Legislative Assembly
- Incumbent Surendra Chaurasia
- Party: Bharatiya Janta Party
- Elected year: 2022

Rampur Karkhana is a constituency of the Uttar Pradesh Legislative Assembly covering the city of Rampur Karkhana in the Deoria district of Uttar Pradesh, India.

Rampur Karkhana is one of five assembly constituencies in the Deoria Lok Sabha constituency. Since 2008, this assembly constituency is numbered 339 amongst 403 constituencies.

== Members of Legislative Assembly ==
Election	Name	Party
Till 2012 : Constituency did not exist
2012	Ghazala Lari	Samajwadi Party
2017	Kamlesh Shukla	Bharatiya Janata Party
2022	Surendra Chaurasia	Bharatiya Janata Party

== Election results ==
=== 2027 ===
2027 Uttar Pradesh Legislative Assembly election: Rampur Karkhana
Party	Candidate	Votes	%	±%
INDIA				
NDA				
BSP				
NOTA	None of the above			
Majority				
Turnout				
gain from		Swing		

=== 2022 ===
2022 Uttar Pradesh Legislative Assembly election: Rampur Karkhana
Party	Candidate	Votes	%	±%
BJP	Surendra Chaurasia	90,742	43.85	▲11.16
SP	Fasiha Manzar Ghazala Lari	76,072	36.76	▲9.26
BSP	Pushpa Shahi	30,493	14.74	▲2.99
INC	Shahla Ahrari	2,016	0.97	
NOTA	None of the above	1,436	0.69	▼0.38
Majority		14,670	7.09	▲1.9
Turnout		206,915	58.08	▼0.51
BJP hold		Swing		

=== 2017 ===
Bharatiya Janta Party candidate Kamlesh Shukla won in last Assembly election of 2017 Uttar Pradesh Legislative Elections defeating Samajwadi Party candidate Fasiha Manzer Ghazala Lari by a margin of 9,987 votes.

2017 Uttar Pradesh Legislative Assembly Election: Rampur Karkhan
Party	Candidate	Votes	%	±%
BJP	Kamlesh Shukla	62,886	32.69	
SP	Fasiha Manzer Ghazala Lari	52,899	27.5	
Independent	Girijesh Alias Guddu Shahi	41,814	21.74	
BSP	Rajeev Kumar Singh	22,610	11.75	
CPI	Anand Prakash	2,454	1.28	
NOTA	None of the above	2,032	1.07	
Majority		9,987	5.19	
Turnout		192,377	58.59	
