= Gorakh Prasad Jaiswal =

Indian politician

Member of Parliament, Lok Sabha
- In office 2009–2014
- Preceded by: Mohan Singh
- Succeeded by: Kalraj Mishra
- Constituency: Deoria

Personal details
- Born: 25 September 1938 (age 87) Deoria, United Provinces, British India
- Party: Bahujan Samaj Party.
- Profession: Agriculturist, Businessperson & Politician.
- Committees: Member of one committee

Gorakh Prasad Jaiswal (born 25 September 1938) is an Indian Politician and was a Member of Parliament of the 15th Lok Sabha of India. He represented the Deoria constituency of Uttar Pradesh as a member of the Bahujan Samaj Party political party.

== Early life and education ==
Gorakh Prasad Jaiswal was born in Deoria in the state of Uttar Pradesh. His highest attained education is matriculation. By profession, he is an Agriculturist and a Businessperson.

== Political career ==
Gorakh Prasad Jaiswal is a first time M.P. He succeeded Mohan Singh who was a M.P in the 14th Lok Sabha and belonged to Samajwadi Party.

== Posts held ==
#	From	To	Position
01	2009	2014	Member, 15th Lok Sabha
02	2009	2014	Member, Committee on Petroleum and Natural Gas

== See also ==
- 15th Lok Sabha
- Politics of India
- Parliament of India
- Government of India
- Bahujan Samaj Party
- Deoria (Lok Sabha constituency)
