= Janmejay Singh =

Indian politician (1945–2020)

Member of the Uttar Pradesh Legislative Assembly
- In office March 2012 – 20 August 2020
- Preceded by: Dinanath Kushwaha
- Constituency: Deoria

Personal details
- Born: 7 July 1945 Devgaon, Deoria, Uttar Pradesh, India
- Died: 20 August 2020 (aged 75) Lucknow, Uttar Pradesh, India
- Party: Bharatiya Janata Party
- Spouse: Gujrati Devi
- Children: 7
- Education: S.S.C.
- Occupation: MLA
- Profession: Politician; Business

Janmejay Singh (7 July 1945 – 20 August 2020) was an Indian politician and member of 16th and 17th Legislative Assembly of Uttar Pradesh. He represented the Deoria (Vidhan Sabha constituency) in Deoria district of Uttar Pradesh as a member of Bharatiya Janata Party.

== Early life and education ==
Singh was born in Devgaon, Deoria of Uttar Pradesh to his father Trilokinath Singh. He was married to Gujrati Devi, they have three sons and four daughters. He had High School degree from Chandrashekhar Aazad Inter College, Deoria.

== Political career ==
Singh was MLA for two terms. From 2012 until his death in 2020, he represented Deoria constituency as a member of Bhartiya Janata Party. In first term 2012, 16th Legislative Assembly of Uttar Pradesh elections, he defeated Bahujan Samaj Party candidate Pramod Singh by a margin of 23,295 votes.

In second term 2017, 17th Legislative Assembly of Uttar Pradesh elections, he defeated Samajwadi Party candidate J.P. Jaiswal by a margin of 46,236 votes.

Singh died on 20 August 2020 at a hospital in Lucknow, after going into cardiac arrest while having a pacemaker fitted.

== Posts held ==
#	From	To	Position	Comments
01	March 2012	March 2017	Member, 16th Legislative Assembly of Uttar Pradesh	
02	March 2017	20 August 2020	Former Member, 17th Legislative Assembly of Uttar Pradesh	
