= Kalraj Mishra =

Indian politician (born 1941)

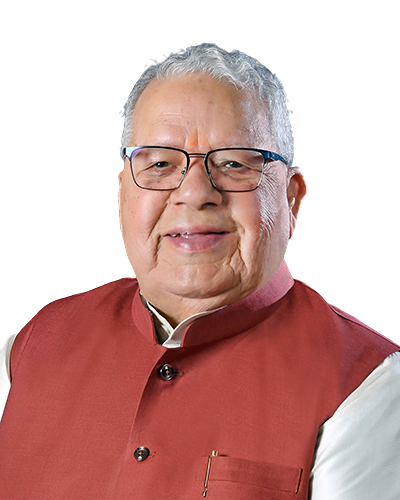
- Mishra in 2023

44th Governor of Rajasthan
- In office 9 September 2019 – 30 July 2024
- Chief Minister: Ashok Gehlot; Bhajan Lal Sharma
- Preceded by: Kalyan Singh
- Succeeded by: Haribhau Bagade

Governor of Himachal Pradesh
- In office 22 July 2019 – 8 September 2019
- Chief Minister: Jai Ram Thakur
- Preceded by: Acharya Devvrat
- Succeeded by: Bandaru Dattatreya

Union Minister of Micro, Small and Medium Enterprises
- In office 26 May 2014 – 3 September 2017
- Preceded by: K. H. Muniyappa
- Succeeded by: Giriraj Singh

Member of Parliament, Lok Sabha
- In office 16 May 2014 – 23 May 2019
- Preceded by: Gorakh Prasad Jaiswal
- Succeeded by: Ramapati Ram Tripathi
- Constituency: Deoria, Uttar Pradesh

Member of Uttar Pradesh Legislative Assembly
- In office 2012–2014
- Preceded by: Vidya Sagar Gupta
- Succeeded by: Ashutosh Tandon
- Constituency: Lucknow East

Minister of Public Works Department, Government of Uttar Pradesh
- In office 21 March 1997 – 17 August 2000
- Chief Minister: Mayawati; Kalyan Singh; Ram Prakash Gupta
- Succeeded by: Om Prakash Singh

Member of Parliament, Rajya Sabha
- In office 7 June 2001 – 21 March 2012
- Preceded by: Rajnath Singh
- Constituency: Uttar Pradesh
- In office 3 April 1978 – 2 April 1984
- Constituency: Uttar Pradesh

Member of Uttar Pradesh Legislative Council
- In office 7 July 1986 – 7 June 2001
- Constituency: elected by members of Legislative Assembly

President of Bharatiya Janata Party, Uttar Pradesh
- In office 17 August 2000 – 24 June 2002
- Preceded by: Om Prakash Singh
- Succeeded by: Vinay Katiyar
- In office 1991–1997
- Preceded by: Kalyan Singh
- Succeeded by: Rajnath Singh

Personal details
- Born: 1 July 1941 (age 85) Malikpur, United Provinces, British India (present-day Uttar Pradesh, India)
- Party: Bharatiya Janata Party
- Spouse: Satyawati Mishra (m. 1963; died 2026)
- Children: 3
- Occupation: Politician
- Website: kalrajmishra.com (defunct)

Kalraj Mishra (born 1 July 1941) is an Indian politician who served as the governor of Rajasthan from 2019 to 2024. He is the former governor of Himachal Pradesh and cabinet minister of Micro, Small and Medium Enterprises in the BJP-led NDA government of Prime Minister Narendra Modi. Being affiliated with the Bharatiya Janata Party (BJP), he was a member of Parliament from Deoria constituency in Uttar Pradesh from 2014 to 2019.

He was a member of Rajya Sabha and a MLA from Lucknow East assembly constituency. He was also President of Uttar Pradesh state unit of the BJP.

He was appointed the Union Minister for Micro, Small and Medium Enterprises (MSME).

== Personal life ==
Mishra was born on 1 July 1941 as the fourth son in a middle-class family in Malikpur, Ghazipur. His father, Ramagya Mishra, was a teacher. He obtained his M.A. degree from Mahatma Gandhi Kashi Vidyapith, Varanasi. He married Satyawati Mishra on 7 May 1963, with whom he has two sons and a daughter. She died on 13 September 2026 at the age of 79.

== Political career ==
In 1977, he was vice–president of Janata Yuva Morcha (Youth organisation of Janata Party), with Subramanian Swamy as its president. In 1979, he was elected as President of Janata Yuva Morcha. He was the first elected National President of Bharatiya Janata Yuva Morcha.

He was a three term member of Rajya Sabha in 1978, 2001 and 2006. He entered politics and held many party positions at state and national level. He was a Cabinet Minister in Government of Uttar Pradesh holding the portfolios of Public Works, Medical Education and Tourism during March 1997 – August 2000 period.

Mishra started a campaign wherein all state highways would be made crater free. He played a role in the formation of Uttarakhand.

First time ever Mishra contested Vidhan Sabha election in 2012 as a BJP candidate from Lucknow East assembly constituency and won the seat for BJP. He initiated many developmental projects. In 2014 Mishra became MP from Deoria constituency & later appointed Cabinet Minister in the Modi government. He was the Minister of Micro, Small and Medium Enterprises from 26 May 2014 to 2 September 2017. On 15 July 2019 he was appointed Governor of Himachal Pradesh replacing Acharya Devvrat who was transferred to Gujarat as Governor.

== Governorship ==
In July 2019, he was appointed the Governor of Himachal Pradesh replacing Acharya Devvrat. In September 2019, he was appointed the Governor of Rajasthan.

== Election history ==
=== Rajya Sabha ===
Position	Party	Constituency	From	To	Tenure
Member of Parliament, Rajya Sabha (1st Term)	JP	Uttar Pradesh	3 April 1978	2 April 1984	5 years, 365 days
Member of Parliament, Rajya Sabha (2nd Term)	BJP	Uttar Pradesh	7 June 2001	2 April 2006	4 years, 299 days
Member of Parliament, Rajya Sabha (3rd Term)	BJP	Uttar Pradesh	3 April 2006	21 March 2012	5 years, 353 days

Lok Sabha
Preceded by Gorakh Prasad Jaiswal	Member of Parliament for Deoria; 16 May 2014 – 22 May 2019	Succeeded by Ramapati Ram Tripathi
Political offices
Preceded by K.H. Muniyappa; Ministers of State (Independent charge)	Minister of Micro, Small and Medium Enterprises; 26 May 2014 – 31 August 2017	Succeeded by Giriraj Singh; Ministers of State (Independent charge)
Preceded by Acharya Devvrat	Governor of Himachal Pradesh; 22 July 2019 – 10 September 2019	Succeeded by Bandaru Dattatreya
Preceded by Kalyan Singh	Governor of Rajasthan; 9 September 2019 – 30 July 2024	Succeeded by Haribhau Bagade
