= Sarju Prasad Misra =

Indian politician

Member of Parliament, Lok Sabha
- In office 1952-1957
- Succeeded by: Ram Ji Verma
- Constituency: Deoria, Uttar Pradesh

Personal details
- Born: 25 June 1905 Payashi, Deoria United Provinces, British India
- Party: Indian National Congress
- Spouse: Indira Devi

Sarju Prasad Misra is an Indian politician. He was elected to the Lok Sabha, the lower house of the Parliament of India from the Deoria constituency of Uttar Pradesh as a member of the Indian National Congress.
