= Pathardeva Assembly constituency =

Constituency of the Uttar Pradesh legislative assembly in India

Coordinates: 26.58°N 83.92°E

Pathardeva
- Constituency No. 338 for the Uttar Pradesh Legislative Assembly

Constituency details
- Country: India
- Region: North India
- State: Uttar Pradesh
- District: Deoria
- Total electors: 3,38,872
- Reservation: None

Member of Legislative Assembly
- 18th Uttar Pradesh Legislative Assembly
- Incumbent Surya Pratap Shahi
- Party: Bharatiya Janta Party
- Elected year: 2017

Pathardeva is a constituency of the Uttar Pradesh Legislative Assembly covering the city of Pathardeva in the Deoria district of Uttar Pradesh, India. Pathardeva is one of five assembly constituencies in the Deoria Lok Sabha constituency. Since 2008, this assembly constituency is numbered 338 amongst 403 constituencies.

== Members of the Legislative Assembly ==
Election	Member	Party
Till 2012 : Constituency did not exist
2012	Shakir Ali	Samajwadi Party
2017	Surya Pratap Shahi	Bharatiya Janata Party
2022	Surya Pratap Shahi	Bharatiya Janata Party

== Election results ==
=== 2027 ===
2027 Uttar Pradesh Legislative Assembly election: Pathardeva
Party	Candidate	Votes	%	±%
INDIA				
NDA				
BSP				
NOTA	None of the above			
Majority				
Turnout				
gain from		Swing		

=== 2022 ===
2022 Uttar Pradesh Legislative Assembly election: Pathardeva
Party	Candidate	Votes	%	±%
BJP	Surya Pratap Shahi	93,858	46.65	▼5.44
SP	Brahmashankar Tripathi	65,177	32.4	▲2.75
BSP	Parvej Alam	33,667	16.73	▲4.84
INC	Ambar Jahan	1,956	0.97	
NOTA	None of the above	954	0.47	▼0.29
Majority		28,681	14.25	▼8.19
Turnout		201,183	59.37	▼0.94
BJP hold		Swing		

=== 2017 ===
Bharatiya Janta Party candidate Surya Pratap Shahi won in last Assembly election of 2017 Uttar Pradesh Legislative Elections defeating Samajwadi Party candidate Shakir Ali by a margin of 42,997 votes.

2017 Uttar Pradesh Legislative Assembly Election: Pathardev
Party	Candidate	Votes	%	±%
BJP	Surya Pratap Shahi	99,812	52.09	
SP	Shakir Ali	56,815	29.65	
BSP	Neeraj	22,790	11.89	
PECP	Harun Ali	4,139	2.16	
AIMIM	Zainul Abedin	1,820	0.95	
NOTA	None of the above	1,450	0.76	
Majority		42,997	22.44	
Turnout		191,614	60.31	

== See also ==
- Deoria district
- Deoria Lok Sabha constituency
