= Khan Sir =

Indian educator (born 1993)

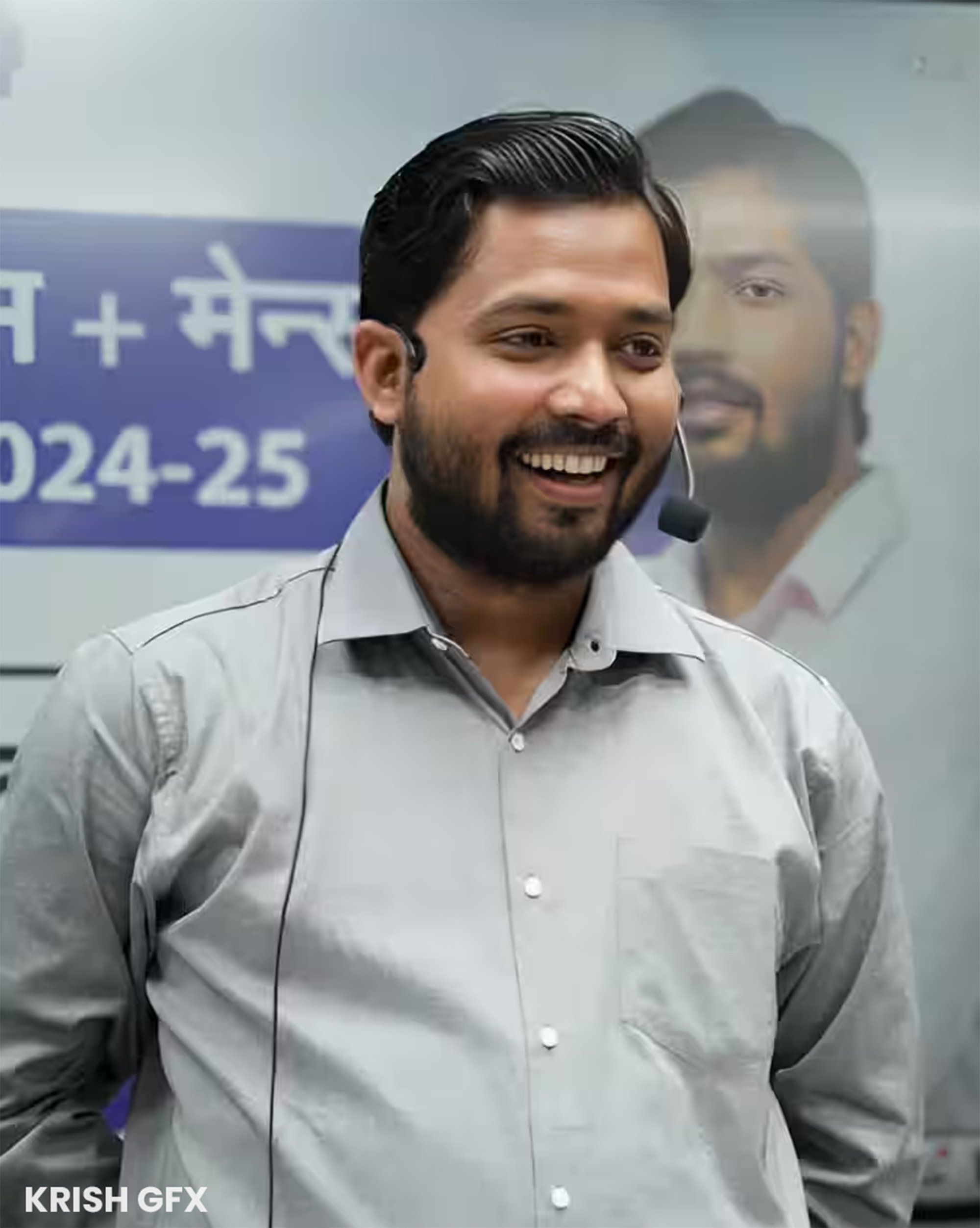
- Khan Sir in 2026
- Born: 12 December 1993 (age 32); Deoria, Uttar Pradesh, India
- Education: University of Allahabad
- Occupations: Educator; Entrepreneur; YouTuber

YouTube information
- Channels: Khan GS Research Centre; Khan Global Studies
- Years active: 2019–present
- Genres: Education; Coaching
- Last updated: 15 January 2026
- Website: khanglobalstudies.com

Faisal Khan, professionally known as Khan Sir, is an Indian educator and YouTuber based in Patna, Bihar. He runs a coaching institute Khan GS Research Center that prepares students for competitive examinations in India.

== Early life and education ==
Faisal Khan was born in Deoria, Uttar Pradesh into a Muslim family. His father worked as a contractor and his mother was a homemaker.

He completed his schooling in Bhatpar Rani and later studied at the University of Allahabad, where he earned a Bachelor of Science degree and a master's degree in geography.

In 2025, he married Ainam Siddiqui alias Zeenat Khan.

== Career ==
Khan began his teaching career in Patna, Bihar with just 6 students but his exceptional teaching methods quickly gained popularity leading to larger class sizes.

In 2019, he launched the Khan GS Research Centre Youtube channel which covered subjects such as general studies, history, geography, polity and current affairs.

To further his reach, he developed the Khan Sir Official app in 2021, offering online courses and study materials, making quality education accessible to students nationwide.

In June 2025, Bihar Governor Arif Mohammad Khan visited Khan's coaching institute in Patna on the occasion of Eid al-Adha. During the visit, they discussed issues related to education and social concerns, including cultural values and crimes against women.

== Controversies ==
In April 2021, a video by Khan on France–Pakistan relations received criticism on social media.

In January 2022, an FIR was registered against several coaching institute teachers, including Khan, in connection with protests related to the Railway Recruitment Board examinations.

In December 2024, he participated in a protest related to changes in the Bihar Public Service Commission examination.

=== Controversy with Anjana Om Kashyap ===
On May 29, 2026, during a live debate on Aaj Tak on the NEET exam system, TV anchor Anjana Om Kashyap commented on the growing influence of online “star teachers” and commercialisation of online teachers. They were referred to as fraudulent ("do kaudi ke Star teachers").

This led to social media reaction in form of videos, posts and broadcasts from online teachers including Khan Sir, Abhinay and others. Some of them allegedly used defamatory words like “bikau patrakar,” “chatukar,” “dalli,” and accused them of engaging in “dalaali” and operating a “fake news ki dukaan" for Anjana and Aaj Tak.

Later Anjana and TV Today Network, for which she works, filed a defamation suit before the Delhi High Court against Faisal Khan (Khan Sir), Abhinay Sharma, Babita Tyagi, Arvind Bhadauriya, and the 4PM News Network, seeking a compensation of Rs. 2 crore and immediate removal of defamatory material from social media platforms.

=== 2026 coaching institute firing case ===
In June 2026, a firing incident took place outside Khan's coaching institute in Patna. Police initiated an investigation into the incident and registered a case in connection with the matter.

Subsequently legal proceedings involving Khan were initiated in connection with the case. In June 2026, his lawyer stated that Khan would seek anticipatory bail and would not surrender before the court while the matter remained under investigation.

Khan stated that he believed the incident might have been linked to rivalry within the coaching industry, although police had not publicly confirmed the claim at the time.

Meanwhile the BJP Government in Bihar has said that law will take its own course.

On 9 June, the Patna Civil Court granted Khan interim protection from arrest till next hearing.

On 13 June, The Patna Civil Court granted Khan Sir along with the three staffers involved in the coaching institute firing case, anticipatory bail.

== Social work ==
Khan sir has been involved in initiatives related to affordable healthcare.

In 2025, he opened a hospital in Patna aimed at providing low-cost medical services to the public. The facility offers treatment at rates reported to be lower than many government hospitals, with a focus on accessibility for economically weaker sections.

Reports have noted that services such as diagnostic tests are provided at very low cost as part of this initiative.

== Public engagements ==
In 2025, Khan sir organises a large Raksha Bandhan event in Patna where thousands of students participated. Reports stated that around 15,000 women tied Rakhi's to him during the celebration, which received media attention.

== See also ==
- List of Indian YouTubers
