= Ugrasen Singh =

Indian politician

Member of Parliament, Lok Sabha
- In office 1977–1980
- Constituency: Deoria

Member of Uttar Pradesh Legislative Assembly
- In office 1957–1969
- Constituency: Salempur West / Barhaj

Personal details
- Born: July 1, 1920 Pauharia Village, Gorakhpur district, United Provinces, British India
- Party: Socialist Party of India (1947–1977)
- Other political affiliations: Hindustan Socialist Republican Association (1936–1938), Congress Socialist Party (1938–1947)
- Spouse: Ram Dulari Devi (m. 1938)
- Children: 5 daughters
- Education: Udai Pratap College, Varanasi (B.A., M.A.)
- Alma mater: Kashi Hindu Vishwavidyalaya
- Occupation: Politician, freedom fighter, educator
- Known for: Participation in Quit India Movement and Navik Vidroh; Leadership in Socialist Party of Uttar Pradesh; Detention under MISA during Emergency; Organizer of Flood Relief and Hindi Sahitya Sammelan

Ugrasen Singh was an Indian politician and freedomfighter. He was a Member of the Uttar Pradesh Legislative Assembly Barhaj Assembly constituency won in 1967 Uttar Pradesh Legislative Assembly election. He also served as the Member of Lok Sabha from Deoria Lok Sabha constituency in 1977.

== Early life and education ==
Singh was born to Thakur Babban Singh at Pauharia Village, Gorakhpur district, Uttar Pradesh on 1 July 1920.

He received a degree of Bachelor of Arts and Master of Arts from Udai Pratap College, Varanasi under Kashi Hindu Vishwavidyalaya.

== Personal life ==
He was married with Ram Dulari Devi in June 1938. They had five daughters. He also taught at the Anglo-Bengali Inter College, Dadar, Bombay and Harsh Chand Inter College, Barhaj Deoria.

== Political and social work ==
During post independence days Ugrasen Singh was associated with the Hindustan Socialist Republican Association 1936–38, the Congress Socialist Party 1938–47. After independence he joined Socialist Party of India 1947—March 1948 and the Socialist Party 1948–1977. He was imprisoned in the Quit India Movement of 1942, expelled from Uttar Pradesh in 1944, participated in the Labor Movement in Bombay 1945—49 and imprisoned in the ‘Navik Vidroh’ in 1946.

He was also detained under the Maintenance of Internal Security Act from June 1975 to January 1977, and jailed more than 30 times from 1950 to 1974.

== Electoral politics ==
- He unsuccessfully contested from Salempur West Assembly constituency in 1952 Uttar Pradesh Legislative Assembly election.
- He successfully contested from Salempur West Assembly constituency in 1957 Uttar Pradesh Legislative Assembly election.
- He successfully contested from Salempur West Assembly constituency in 1962 Uttar Pradesh Legislative Assembly election.
- He successfully contested from Barhaj Assembly constituency in 1967 Uttar Pradesh Legislative Assembly election.
- He unsuccessfully contested from Barhaj Assembly constituency in 1974 Uttar Pradesh Legislative Assembly election.
- He successfully contested from Deoria Loksabha constituency in 1977 Indian general election.

He was elected as a Member of the Uttar Pradesh Legislative Assembly for the 1957–69 term. He became Chief Whip and Leader of the Socialist Party in the Uttar Pradesh Legislative Assembly. He was elected General Secretary of Samyukta Vidhayak Dal in Uttar Pradesh from 1967 to 1969; became President of the Samyukta Socialist Party Uttar Pradesh in 1970 and the Socialist Party, Uttar Pradesh in 1974. He was an organiser of the Flood Relief Committee in Uttar Pradesh and the Hindi Sahitya Sammelan in Deoria. He was a Member of the Bhikshu Sangh, Kushinagar; Chairman of the Milk Committee 1968–70, Uttar Pradesh, and a member of the Petitions Committee.
