= Virendra K Baranwal =

Indian agricultural researcher

- Born: 10 July 1960 (age 66); Deoria, Uttar Pradesh, India
- Education: Lucknow University, BRD Post Graduate College; B.Sc., M.Sc., Ph.D.
- Scientific career
- Fields: Plant pathology, virology
- Workplaces: Central Plantation Crops Research Institute, Agricultural Research Service, National Centre for Integrated Pest Management, Division of Plant Pathology, National Centre for Integrated Pest Management
- Thesis: Molecular diagnostics and characterization of plant viruses and virus like pathogens

Virendra K Baranwal is an Indian academic, scientist and agricultural researcher.

== Personal life ==
Baranwal was born on 10 July 1960 in Deoria, Uttar Pradesh. He was educated at Maharaja Agrasen Inter College in Deoria. He earned B.Sc., M.Sc. and Ph.D. degrees from Lucknow University.

== Selected bibliography ==
=== Books ===
- Bikash Mandal; Govind Pratap Rao; Virendra K Baranwal, Rakesh Kumar Jain (28 November 2017). A Century of Plant Virology in India. Springer Singapore. ISBN 978-981-10-5672-7.

== Awards and honors ==
- DBT Overseas Fellowship, secretary - 2000
- Indian Virological Society, member - 2008
- Technical expert committee - 2010
- National Certification System for Tissue Cultured Plants - 2015
- University of Florida, USA - 2010
