= Bishwanath Roy =

Indian politician

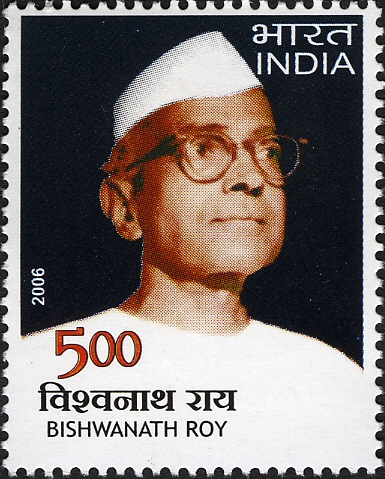
- Bishwanath Roy on a 2006 stamp of India

Member of Parliament, Lok Sabha
- In office 1952–1977
- Succeeded by: Devta Mani Tripathi
- Constituency: Deoria, Uttar Pradesh

Personal details
- Born: 10 December 1906 Khukhundoo, United Provinces of Agra and Oudh, British India
- Died: 27 August 1984 (aged 77) Varanasi, Uttar Pradesh, India
- Party: Indian National Congress
- Spouse: Sheela Rai
- Children: 3

Bishwanath Roy (10 December 1906 – 27 August 1984) was an Indian freedom fighter and politician. He was elected to the Lok Sabha, the lower house of the Parliament of India from the Deoria constituency of Uttar Pradesh as a member of the Indian National Congress. He was a student of St. Andrew's College, Gorakhpur and the University of Allahabad. He was the Deputy Minister of Labour, Employment and Rehabilitation in the Union government.
