= Anjana Om Kashyap =

Indian news anchor

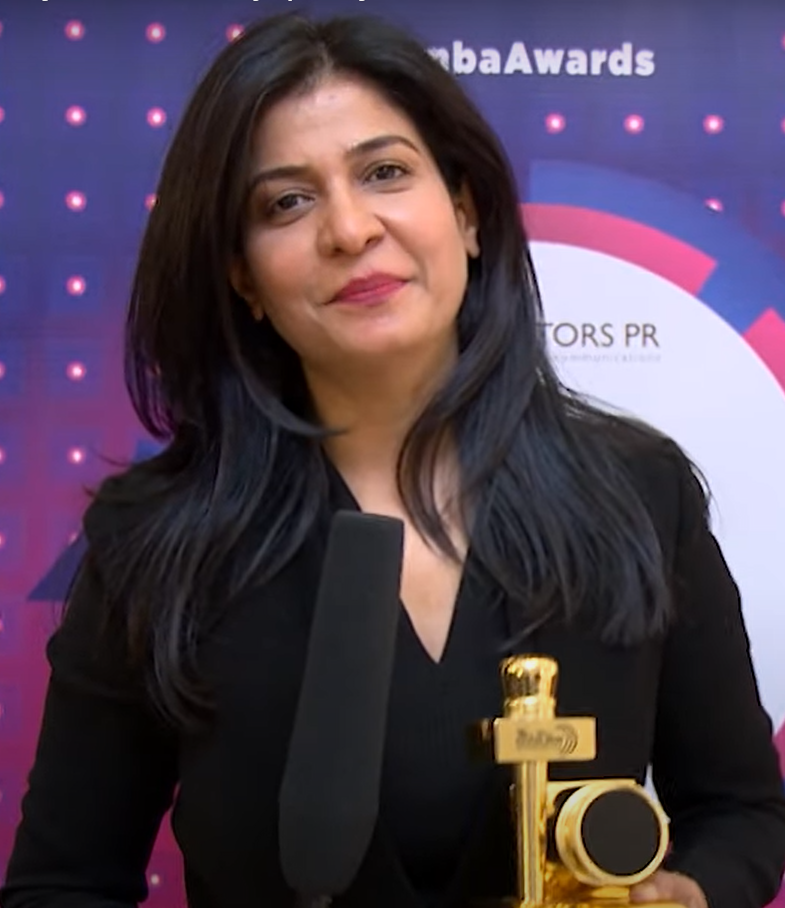
- Kashyap in 2021
- Born: Ranchi, Bihar (now Jharkhand), India
- Education: Jamia Millia Islamia; Delhi University
- Occupations: Journalism, news presenter
- Years active: 2003 – present
- Employer: Aaj Tak
- Spouse: Mangesh Kashyap
- Children: 2

Anjana Om Kashyap is an Indian journalist, television news anchor and media executive who serves as Managing Editor of the Hindi-language news channel Aaj Tak. She began her journalism career with Doordarshan before joining Zee News. She later worked for News 24 and subsequently joined Aaj Tak.

== Early life and education ==
Kashyap was born in a middle-class family to Omprakash Tiwari in Ranchi, then in Bihar. Her father was a doctor on short-service-commission with the Indian Army, and served during the Bangladesh War of Liberation.

Kashyap had her schooling at Loreto Convent, a local Catholic school, and then from Delhi Public School, Ranchi. She went on to pursue an honours in Botany from the University of Delhi. Kashyap went on to appear for the All India Pre Medical Test but failed to pass. She was a prolific debater and exhibited strong leadership qualities since childhood, having become the head-girl in both the schools and the president of her college hostel.

After a few years, she enrolled at the Delhi School of Social Work, for her post-graduation. Kashyap mentions that the curricula and field visits inculcated a spirit of public activism in her.

== Career ==
Kashyap's first job was as a counsellor at the Daewoo Motors, however she resigned soon after a year. She then joined an NGO in the roles of a legal counsellor.

=== Journalism ===
In the early 2000s, Kashyap opted for a diploma in journalism from Jamia Millia Islamia. Upon graduation, she joined Doordarshan, where she was assigned to the news-desk of Aankhon Dekhi, an investigative show but was also allotted infrequent reporting duties.

Within a year, she moved to Zee News. Whilst she wanted to be an anchor, the channel found her lacking in speaking finesse and employed her in producing roles. In her later years at Zee, she successfully passed the auditions and was occasionally used as an anchor for special features.

In 2007, she joined News 24, where she was, for the first time, assigned a mainstream role at anchoring in the form of moderating an evening debate show. She left the venture in early 2012 and moved to Star News; however, it was shut down months later. Kashyap thus became one of the several journalists, to follow her immediate ex-boss at News24 – Supriya Prasad from News 24 to Aaj Tak, around late 2012.

== Reception ==
A long-form piece over The Caravan (by Nikita Saxena), has been highly critical of Kashyap's journalism, noting the aggressive propagation of Hindutva centred ideologies and biased reporting in favour of the Bharatiya Janata Party, across a variety of situations. Scroll.in has noted her to be an establishment friendly news anchor. Kashyap was one of the few reporters who was allowed to interview Narendra Modi in the run-up to the 2019 National Elections. Saxena opines that Kashyap refused to pose any challenging question to him. Kashyap's reporting of the 2019 Supreme Court proceedings on Ayodhya title dispute toed a pro-Hindutva line with numerous debates and special shows, that spanned a vast avenue from seeking the reasons behind a routine deferment of the case (around 18 October) to inquiring about why the Muslims were unable to compromise with a mere 5 acre land, and the timeline of Ram Mandir construction, all along with provocative headlines and audience-polls; it ended with welcoming the final verdict in favour of the Hindus, as a sacred occasion.

While reporting about the 2019 Bihar encephalitis outbreak, Kashyap entered the neonatal ICU at Sri Krishna Medical College and Hospital and started haranguing the on-duty paediatrician. She was widely criticised for her inappropriate behaviour. The Indian Medical Association subsequently filed a complaint against her, for endangering the lives of children, in an attempt to gain publicity.

== Filmography ==
| Year | Title | Role | Notes |
|---|---|---|---|
| 2016 | Sultan | Herself | News anchor |

== Awards and accolades ==
- In November 2014, Kashyap was awarded the Indian Television Academy Award for Best Anchor after her work as a news anchor on Aaj Tak.
- In February 2015, she received the ENBA Awards Best Anchor (Hindi) honour — as reported under the coverage of the 2014 ENBA ceremony.
- In December 2018, she was awarded the Indian Television Academy Award for Best Anchor – News/Current Affairs Show in Hindi.

== Personal life ==
Kashyap is married to Mangesh Kashyap, an officer of the 1995 Delhi, Andaman and Nicobar Islands Police Service cadre. Anjana met Mangesh during her days at Delhi University. Mangesh was the erstwhile Addl. Deputy Commissioner of the Delhi Police and since 2016, has been the Chief Vigilance Officer of South Delhi Municipal Corporation. They have a son and a daughter.

== Controversies ==
Kashyap has been noted to be a strong voice against reservations in India for socially oppressed classes and likewise affirmative actions; in a media-panel discussion, she had once described the system to be infested by 'termites', which brought neither social mobility nor economic affluence for the target-populace.

In September 2025, Azad Adhikar Sena President Amitabh Thakur registered a complaint against Kashyap for her show Black and White, was titled "Bharat vibhajan ka maksad pura kyun nahi hua?", which is presently pending before a Lucknow Court.

In October 2025, an FIR was filed against Kashyap for her remarks on the sage Valmiki which supposedly hurt the sentiments of the Valmiki caste.

On the morning of 11 November 2025, Kashyap aired an unverified and false report claiming that veteran actor Dharmendra had died. After the story got viral, many prominent figures condoled Dharmendra's death on X only to delete their posts after finding out that the actor did not die but was in fact receiving treatment. Aaj Tak and India Today later expressed apologies on their social media handles. She became a target for trolls who in turn started sharing news of her fake death.

In May 2026, Kashyap made a statement against Youtuber teachers, that led to widespread social media backlash, along with allegations and counter allegations. While she commented on the growing influence of online “star teachers” and commercialisation of online teachers, using derogatory words like "do kaudi ke Star teachers" etc for them, meaning frauds and imposters, this led to massive social media reaction in form of videos, posts and broadcasts from many online teachers, with some using defamatory words like “bikau patrakar”, “chatukar”, “dalli”, and accused them of engaging in “dalaali” and operating a “fake news ki dukaan" for Anjana and Aaj Tak. Later Anjana and TV Today Network filed a defamation suit before the Delhi High Court against Khan Sir, Abhinay Sharma, Babita Tyagi, Arvind Bhadauriya, and the 4PM News Network, seeking a compensation of Rs. 2 crore and immediate removal of defamatory material from social media platforms. On 8 June, the Delhi High Court refused to provide any Interim relief to Kashyap and TV Today in their defamation suit fixing 17 June as next date of hearing.

Due to Pro Government views, She is often referred as a member of Godi media
