= Marghoob Ahmad Lari =

Indian politician (1947 – 2020)

Member Uttar Pradesh Legislative Council India
- In office 1990–1996
- Constituency: Salempur, Uttar Pradesh

Personal details
- Born: 28 December 1947 Lar, India
- Died: 31 January 2020 (aged 72)
- Party: Chandra Shekhar's Janata Dal (Socialist) party, Samajwadi Party, Bahujan Samaj Party
- Profession: Politician

Marghoob Ahmad Lari or Margoob Ahmad Lari (28 December 1947 to 31 January 2020) was a politician from Uttar Pradesh, India. In 1991, he served as a Minister of State, Tourism Department under the government of Chief Minister Mulayam Singh Yadav in Uttar Pradesh.

== Political life ==
Marghoob Ahmad Lari was born on 28 December 1947 at Lar Deoria and completed his post graduation, M.A. degree, from Lucknow where he resided due to his family business. His political career was rooted around his birth place in Deoria district. He worked in the beginning with Chandra Shekhar's Janata Dal (Socialist) party becoming a member of Uttar Pradesh Legislative Council MLC on the ticket from the aforementioned party during 1990 to 1996. In addition, in 1991 he was the Minister of State, Tourism department in Uttar Pradesh government. Later in his career, he worked with other socialist Parties i.e Bahujan Samajwadi Party and Samajwadi Party of Mulyam Singh Yadav in U.P. He is credited to establish a Girls degree college in the town of his birth Lar.

== Death ==
He died in Lucknow on 31 January 2020 and was buried in his ancestral town Lar, Deoria.
