= Shalabh Mani Tripathi =

Member of the Uttar Pradesh Legislative Assembly

Shalabh Mani Tripathi शलभ मणि त्रिपाठी
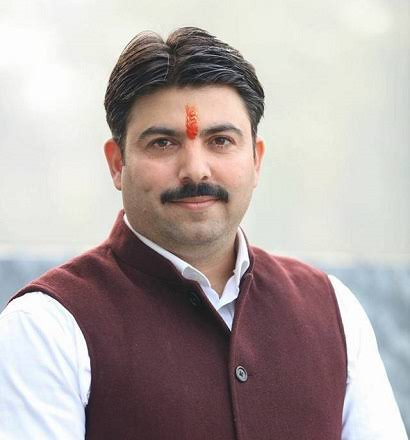

Member of the Uttar Pradesh Legislative Assembly
- Incumbent
- Assumed office 10 March 2022
- Constituency: Deoria

Personal details
- Born: 1 December 1977 (age 48) Deoria, Uttar Pradesh, India
- Party: Bhartiya Janata Party
- Occupation: Journalist
- Website: Official Website

Shalabh Mani Tripathi (born 1 December 1977) is a former Indian TV journalist, turned politician of the Bhartiya Janata Party who is an elected member from Deoria Assembly constituency in 2022 in Deoria district of Uttar Pradesh.

== Early life and career ==
He was born on 1 December 1977 in Deoria district of Uttar Pradesh. His father was a government teacher.

In 1998, after completing Post Graduation in mathematics he joined Dainik Jagran as a journalist.

In December 2016 he joined Bhartiya Janata Party.

Tripathi previously worked with Dainik Jagran, Amar Ujala, and News 18.
