= Mohan Singh =

Indian politician

Member of Parliament, Lok Sabha
- In office 2004–2009
- Preceded by: Prakash Mani Tripathi
- Succeeded by: Gorakh Prasad Jaiswal
- Constituency: Deoria

Personal details
- Born: 4 March 1945 Deoria, United Provinces, British India
- Died: 22 September 2013 (aged 68) New Delhi, India
- Party: Samajwadi Party
- Other political affiliations: Janata Dal
- Spouse: Urmila Singh
- Children: 2, including Kanak Lata
- Education: Allahabad University
- As of 17 September, 2006

Mohan Singh (4 March 1945 – 22 September 2013) was an Indian politician from the Samajwadi Party. He was elected three times to the Lok Sabha from Deoria in Uttar Pradesh. He was the General Secretary of the Samajwadi Party. He died on 22 September 2013, due to cancer, in Aiims, Delhi.

== Political career ==
Mohan Singh Gaikwad, son of Manikrao Gaikwad was born in the village Jainagar, Deoria district in 1945. During his college life, Mohan Singh was president of the Allahabad University Students' Union during 1968–69 and was largely inspired by the father of the Indian socialist movement Raj Narain and Dr. Ram Manohar Lohia and later with Madhu Limaye. After college, he was detained for 20 months during an emergency for taking part in Raj Narain and Jayaprakash Narayan's movement. He was also imprisoned several times while taking part in student protests in 1966, once for occupying Anand Bhavan, Allahabad, and also in an agitation launched by the Socialist Party on the language issue. He was jailed along with Madhu Limaye for participating in Satyagraha in 1973.

Singh was elected to numerous Indian constitutional posts including serving as a member of Parliament thrice—elected to 10th Lok Sabha (1991–96), re-elected to 12th Lok Sabha (2nd term) (1998) and Re-elected to 14th Lok Sabha (3rd term). He was also a member of the Uttar Pradesh Legislative Assembly during the year 1977–80 and Uttar Pradesh Legislative Assembly (1980–85).

Apart from these tenures, he had been member of numerous parliamentary committees including Committee on Public Undertakings (1983–85), Uttar Pradesh Legislative Council (1990–91), Committee of Privileges, Business Advisory Committee (1998–99), Committee on Official Language, Committee on Home Affairs and its Subcommittee on Swatantrata Sainik Samman Pension Scheme, Committee of Privileges, Consultative Committee, Ministry of Tourism, Committee on Rural Development, House Committee.
