= Shakir Ali (politician) =

Indian politician (1953–2020)

Member of the Uttar Pradesh Legislative Assembly
- In office 2012–2017
- Preceded by: Surya Pratap Shahi
- Succeeded by: Surya Pratap Shahi
- Constituency: Pathardeva

Personal details
- Born: 15 December 1953; Karjahan, Deoria, Uttar Pradesh, India
- Died: 24 February 2020 (aged 66)
- Party: Samajwadi Party
- Spouse: Shammima Khatoon (m. 1978)
- Children: 4
- Education: Banaras Hindu University (1973)
- Profession: Agriculture; fisheries

Shakir Ali (15 December 1953 – 24 February 2020) was an Indian politician and cabinet minister in the Uttar Pradesh government. He served as the MLA from Pathardeva in the Uttar Pradesh Legislative Assembly after being elected in the 2012 Uttar Pradesh Legislative Assembly election as a Samajwadi Party candidate.

== Personal life ==
Ali was born on 15 December 1953 to Manzoor Ali in the village of Karjahan in Deoria district in Uttar Pradesh. After his initial schooling from Karjahan, he completed his high school from Ashok Inter College, Barpar and passed the intermediate examination from Harishchandra Inter College, Varanasi. He graduated from Banaras Hindu University in 1973. Ali married Shammima Khatoon on 18 November 1978. with whom he has three sons and a daughter. His professional ventures include agriculture and fishery.

Ali died on 24 February 2020 in Medanta Hospital in Lucknow where he was undergoing treatment for some time. He was 66.

== Political career ==
Ali entered politics in 1989 and contested as a member of Bahujan Samaj Party (BSP) from Gauribazar assembly constituency, but was defeated. It followed another defeat in 1991. Third time in 1993, he won as a candidate of the BSP-SP alliance and became a Minister of Education in the Uttar Pradesh Government in the cabinet ministry of Mulayam Singh Yadav from 21 June 1994 to 28 October 1995. In 1996, he contested as a member of Samajwadi Party (SP) after leaving Bahujan Samaj Party in June 1995, but lost. In 2000 by-election, he was defeated again.

Ali won from the Gauribazar assembly constituency in the 2002 election and was a member of the Committee of Government Assurances from 2002 to 2003. He became the cabinet minister of the Minor Irrigation and Muslim Waqf Board from 2003 to 2007. He faced defeat in the 2007 election. Ali was also a member of the Committee on Public Account from 2012 to 2013.

In 2012, contesting from Pathardeva constituency, he defeated the then incumbent Surya Pratap Shahi of Bharatiya Janata Party, but lost back to Shahi in the 2017 Legislative Assembly election.
