= Raj Mangal Pande =

Indian politician (1920–1993)

Member of Parliament, Lok Sabha
- In office 1984–1991
- Preceded by: Devata Mani Tripathi
- Succeeded by: Mohan Singh
- Constituency: Deoria, Uttar Pradesh

Minister of Human Resource Development
- In office 21 November 1990 – 21 June 1991
- Prime Minister: Chandra Shekhar
- Preceded by: V. P. Singh
- Succeeded by: Arjun Singh

Personal details
- Born: 10 May 1920 Sohang, Deoria, Gorakhpur district, United Provinces, British India
- Died: 22 November 1993 (aged 73) Kanpur, India
- Party: Samajwadi Janata Party (Rashtriya)
- Other political affiliations: Congress (1940–1977); Janata Party (1977–1979); Congress (S)(1979–1983); Congress (I)(1983–1989); Janata Dal(1989–1990)
- Spouse: Saraswati Devi

Raj Mangal Pande (10 May 1920 – 22 November 1993) was an Indian politician. He was elected to 9th Lok Sabha from Deoria constituency of Uttar Pradesh as a member of the Janata Dal. He served as Minister of Human Resource Development in Chandra Shekhar government from 1990 to 1991.

== Early life ==
Raj Mangal Pande was born on 10 May 1920 at Sohang in Deoria district of United Provinces, British India (now Uttar Pradesh). He was awarded Bachelor of Arts and Bachelor of Law degree at Allahabad University. He participated in freedom struggle movements. In 1933, he married Saraswati Devi. The couple had 3 sons and 4 daughters.

== Political career ==
Pande was elected as Member of Legislative Assembly four times consecutively. For his initial grooming in the Congress Party, he approached and received help from the senior leader Nirmal Chandra Chaturvedi, MLC. In 1969 and 1974, he won on Congress ticket. In 1977, he joined Janata Party and fought Uttar Pradesh assembly election on Janata Party ticket. In 1984, he was elected to 8th Lok Sabha from Deoria constituency on Congress ticket. Later in 1989, he joined Janata Dal and was re-elected from Deoria constituency to 9th Lok Sabha.

In November 1990, he was one of the 64 MPs who left Janata Dal and formed Chandra Shekhar government. He was made Minister of Human Resource Development in Chandra Shekhar government.

== Death ==
Raj Mangal Pande died in Kanpur on 22 November 1993, at the age of 73.
