= Deoria, Uttar Pradesh =

Deoria
- City
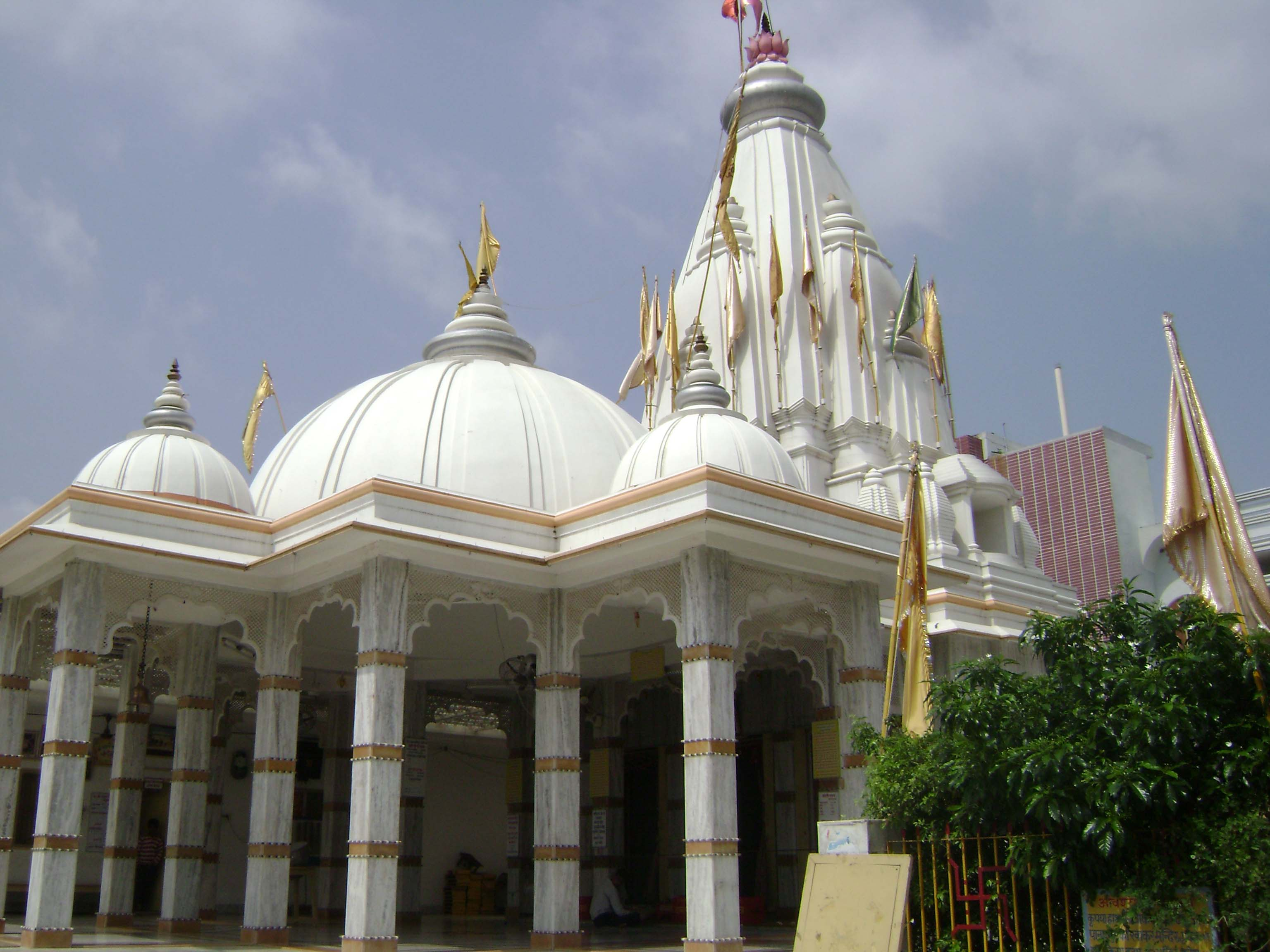
- Shyam Mandir Temple

- Location in Uttar Pradesh, India Deoria (India)
- Coordinates: 26.50167°N 83.77936°E
- Country: India
- State: Uttar Pradesh
- District: Deoria

Government
  - Type: Municipal Council
  - Body: Deoria Municipal Council
  - Chairman of Municipality: Alka Singh
- Elevation: 68 m (223 ft)

Population (2011)
  - Total: 129,479

Language
  - Official: Hindi
  - Additional official: Urdu
  - Regional: Bhojpuri
- Time zone: UTC+5:30 (IST)
- PIN: 274001
- Telephone code: 05568
- Vehicle registration: UP-52
- Website: Official Website

District Officers
- Interactive map of District Officers

Government
  - D.M.: Madhusudhan Hulgi IAS
  - A.D.M(F/R): Arun Kumar Rai
  - A.D.M(E): Jainendra Singh
  - S.P.: Vikrant Vir
  - CDO: Pratyush Pandey

Deoria is a city in the state of Uttar Pradesh, India. Deoria is located 45 km east of Gorakhpur and about 317 km from the state capital Lucknow. It shares its eastern border with the Indian state of Bihar. It is one of five tehsils of the Deoria district and serves as the administrative headquarters of that district, and is part of the Gorakhpur division. As per the 2011 Census, the population of Deoria city was 129,479, with a literacy rate of 86.8%. The city is an important agricultural and trade hub in the region and is well connected by road and rail networks to other parts of Uttar Pradesh and Bihar.

== Geography ==
The climate of Deoria is classified as humid subtropical, with hot summers, a monsoon season, and cool winters. Average temperatures range from 25°C to 45°C in summer and 8°C to 20°C in winter. The monsoon season, occurring between June and September, brings the majority of the annual rainfall, which averages around 1,000 millimetres.

== History ==
Deoria, a city in eastern Uttar Pradesh, India, derives its name from the Sanskrit term "Devaranya," which translates to "forest of gods." The region holds historical and cultural significance, with mentions in ancient scriptures and texts.

In ancient times, Deoria was part of the Kosala Kingdom, known for its prominence in Indian history and mythology. The region is associated with the epic Ramayana, as Kosala was the kingdom of Lord Rama. During the Mauryan and Gupta Empire periods, Deoria was an integral part of the larger administrative and cultural framework.

During the medieval period, Deoria experienced the influence of various ruling dynasties, including the Mughals. The area saw gradual economic development through agriculture and trade. Under British colonial rule, Deoria gained prominence as an administrative center and contributed to the Indian independence movement through the efforts of local leaders.

After India's independence in 1947, Deoria became part of the state of Uttar Pradesh. It has since undergone infrastructural and economic development, with agriculture remaining a significant part of the local economy. Today, Deoria is known for its cultural diversity, religious significance, and evolving urban landscape.

== Demographics ==
As of 2011 Indian Census, Deoria had a total population of 129,479, of which 67,462 were males and 62,017 were females. Population within the age group of 0 to 6 years was 14,779. The total number of literates in Deoria was 99,562, which constituted 76.9% of the population with male literacy of 81.1% and female literacy of 72.3%. The effective literacy rate of 7+ population of Deoria was 86.8%, of which male literacy rate was 91.6% and female literacy rate was 81.6%. The Scheduled Castes and Scheduled Tribes population was 8,177 and 2,228 respectively. Deoria had 20076 households in 2011. Bhojpuri is natively spoken along with Hindi.

According to the 2001 census Deoria had 104,222 inhabitants (54,737 men, 49,485 women).

=== Religion ===
Religion in Deoria city (2011)
Religion	Percent
Hinduism	87.77%
Islam	11.66%
Others	0.57%

As of 2011, Hinduism is largest religion in Deoria city with 113,640 Hindus (87.77%). Islam is second largest religion in Deoria with 15,098 Muslim (11.66%). Other religions includes 259 Sikhs (0.2%), 177 Christians (0.14%), 110 Buddhists (0.08%), 23 Jains (0.02%), 6 did Others (<0.01%) and 166 did not answer (0.13%).

== Notable people ==
- Shakir Ali, politician and former cabinet minister in the Uttar Pradesh government.
- Devraha Baba, Indian Siddha Yogi
- Virendra K Baranwal, academic, scientist and agricultural researcher
- Surendra Chaurasia, politician and member of legislative assembly from Rampur Karkhana
- Gorakh Prasad Jaiswal, politician and former member of parliament from Deoria
- Marghoob Ahmad Lari, politician and former state minister in the Uttar Pradesh government.
- Muzaffar Ahmad Lari, Urdu writer
- Shashank Mani, politician and Member of Parliament from Deoria
- Noori Mian, former owner of Bhatni Sugar Mill Deoria
- Surya Pratap Shahi, politician and cabinet minister in the Uttar Pradesh government.
- Mohan Singh, politician and member of parliament from Deoria
- Khan Sir, Indian educator and YouTuber
- Shalabh Mani Tripathi, politician and member of legislative assembly from Deoria
