= Surendra Chaurasia =

Member of the Uttar Pradesh Legislative Assembly

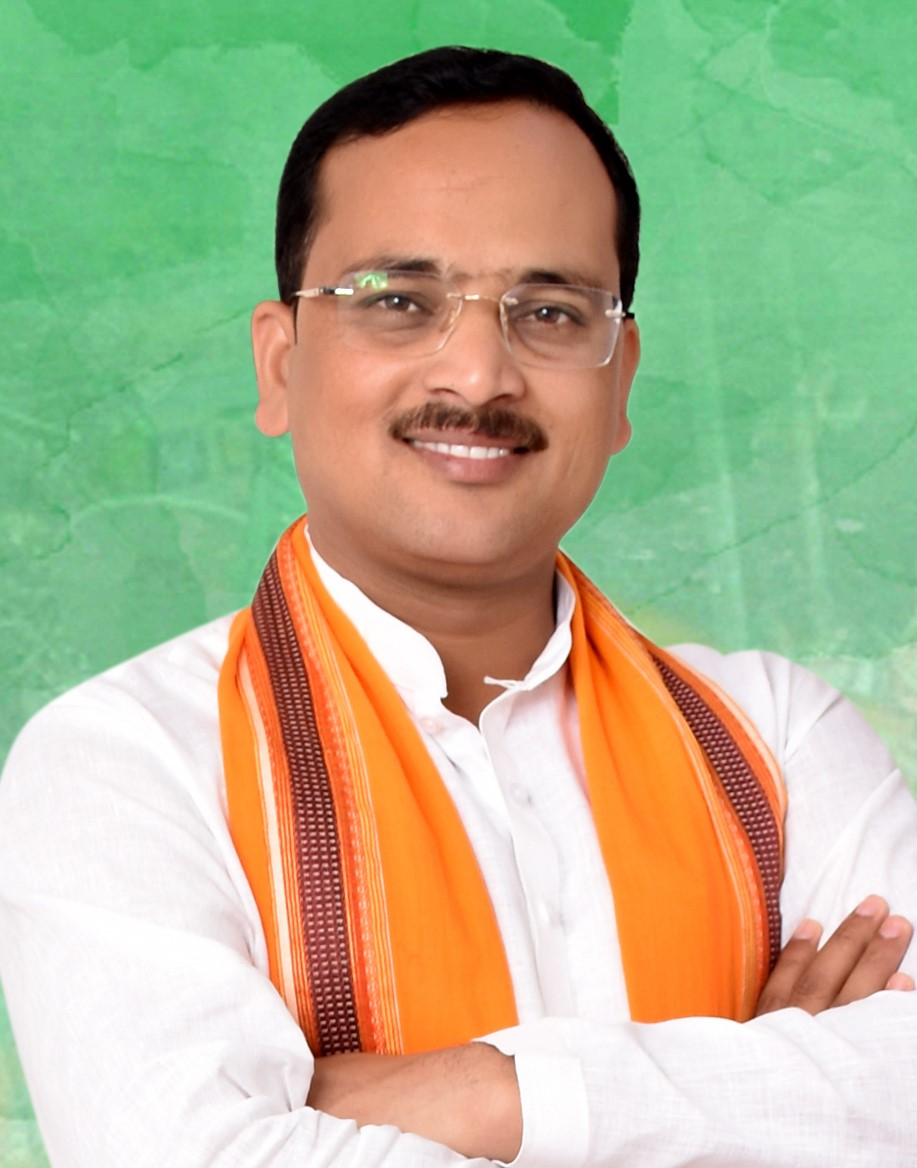

Member of the Uttar Pradesh Legislative Assembly
- Incumbent
- Assumed office 10 March 2022
- Constituency: Rampur Karkhana

Personal details
- Born: 22 July 1989 (age 37) Kushahari, Uttar Pradesh, India
- Party: Bhartiya Janata Party
- Education: Graduate
- Occupation: Agriculture & Business

Surendra Chaurasia (born 22 July 1989) is a farmer, turned politician of the Bhartiya Janata Party who is an elected member from Rampur Karkhana Assembly constituency in 2022 in Deoria district of Uttar Pradesh.

== Early life ==
Surendra Chaurasia was born in an ordinary family in village Kushahari of Deoria district. Started student politics by joining Akhil Bharatiya Vidyarthi Parishad and then joined Hindu Yuva Vahini by adopting the ideology of Hindutva under the guidance of Chief Minister Yogi Adityanath of Uttar Pradesh. His profession according to the election affidavit filed with the Election Commission of India is: Agriculture & Business.

== Political career ==
Surendra Chaurasia is an elected MLA of the 18th Uttar Pradesh Legislative Assembly and represents the Rampur Karkhana constituency of Deoria. Presently a member of Bharatiya Janata Party, before that he contested student union election in 2006 and then was elected as member of District Panchayat in 2010. He became one of the youngest MLAs in Uttar Pradesh Legislative Assembly by defeating veteran candidate Ghazala Laari.
