= Rajasthan Pradesh Congress Committee =

Indian state-level political party

- President: Govind Singh Dotasra
- Chairman: Tika Ram Jully
- Headquarters: Indira Gandhi Bhawan, Chandpol, Jaipur-302001, Rajasthan
- Youth wing: Rajasthan Youth Congress
- Women's wing: Rajasthan Pradesh Mahila Congress Committee
- Ideology: Populism; Social liberalism; Democratic socialism; Social democracy; Secularism
- Political position: Centre
- ECI Status: A State Unit of Indian National Congress
- Alliance: Indian National Developmental Inclusive Alliance
- Seats in Rajya Sabha: 5 / 10
- Seats in Lok Sabha: 8 / 25
- Seats in Rajasthan Legislative Assembly: 67 / 200

Election symbol

Website
- https://www.rajpcc.com/

Rajasthan Pradesh Congress Committee (RPCC) is the Pradesh Congress Committee (state wing) of the Indian National Congress (INC) serving in the state of Rajasthan. It is responsible for organizing and coordinating the party's activities and campaigns within the state, as well as selecting candidates for local, state, and national elections.

== Structure and composition ==
S.No	Name	Designation
1	Govind Singh Dotasra	President; Rajasthan Pradesh Congress Committee
2	Ashok Gehlot	Senior Leader; Former Chief Minister & RPCC Leader
3	Tika Ram Jully	Leader of the Opposition Rajasthan Legislative Assembly
5	Vinod Jakhar	President; NSUI Rajasthan Pradesh

== Rajasthan Legislative Assembly election ==
Year	Party leader	Seats won	Change in seats	Outcome
1952	Tika Ram Paliwal	82 / 160	New	Government
1957	Mohan Lal Sukhadia	119 / 176	▲37	Government
1962	Mohan Lal Sukhadia	88 / 176	▼31	Government
1967	Mohan Lal Sukhadia	89 / 184	▲1	Government
1972	Barkatullah Khan	145 / 184	▲56	Government
1977	Hari Dev Joshi	41 / 200	▼104	Opposition
1980	Jagannath Pahadia	133 / 200	▲92	Government
1985	Hari Dev Joshi	113 / 200	▼20	Government
1990	Hari Dev Joshi	50 / 200	▼63	Opposition
1993	Hari Dev Joshi	76 / 200	▲26	Opposition
1998	Ashok Gehlot	153 / 200	▲77	Government
2003	Ashok Gehlot	56 / 200	▼97	Opposition
2008	Ashok Gehlot	96 / 200	▲40	Government
2013	Ashok Gehlot	21 / 200	▼75	Opposition
2018	Ashok Gehlot	100 / 200	▲79	Government
2023	Ashok Gehlot	70 / 200	▼30	Opposition

Rajasthan Congress Legislative Assembly seat count

== Performance in General Elections (Lok Sabha) ==
Lok Sabha Elections
Year	Lok Sabha	Seats contested	Seats won	(+/-) in seats	% of votes	Vote swing	Popular vote	Outcome
1951	1st	20	9 / 20	New entry	41.42%	New entry	14,60,971	Government
1957	2nd	22	19 / 22	▲10	53.65%	▲12.23	24,94,094	Government
1962	3rd	21	14 / 22	▼5	37.58%	▼16.07	19,51,507	Government
1967	4th	22	10 / 23	▼4	39.95%	▲2.37	27,22,493	Government
1971	5th	23	14 / 23	▲4	50.35%	▲10.40	34,86,776	Government
1977	6th	25	1 / 25	▼13	30.56%	▼19.79	25,68,345	Opposition
1980	7th	25	18 / 25	▲17	42.64%	▲12.08	40,40,398	Government
1984	8th	25	25 / 25	▲7	52.72%	▲10.08	58,98,116	Government
1989	9th	25	0 / 25	▼25	36.98%	▼15.74	52,85,868	Opposition
1991	10th	25	13 / 25	▲13	43.97%	▲6.99	54,07,144	Government
1996	11th	25	12 / 25	▼1	40.51%	▼3.46	52,53,531	Opposition
1998	12th	25	18 / 25	▲6	44.45%	▲3.94	78,46,072	Opposition
1999	13th	25	9 / 25	▼9	45.12%	▲0.67	74,75,888	Opposition
2004	14th	25	4 / 25	▼5	41.42%	▼3.70	71,79,939	Government
2009	15th	25	20 / 25	▲16	47.19%	▲5.77	84,61,227	Government
2014	16th	25	0 / 25	▼20	30.36%	▼16.83	82,30,164	Opposition
2019	17th	25	0 / 25	Steady	34.24%	▲3.88	1,11,07,910	Opposition
2024	18th	22	8 / 25	▲11	37.91%	▲3.67	1,24,45,396	Opposition

== List of presidents ==
S.No	President	Portrait	Term		
1.	Lakshmi Kumari Chundawat		1971	1972	
2.	Parasram Maderna		1972	1977	
3.	Ram Kishore Vyas		1977	1981	
4.	Hira Lal Devpura		1981	1985	
5.	Ashok Gehlot		1985	1989	
(2).	Parasram Maderna		1989	1994	
(5).	Ashok Gehlot		1 December 1995	14 April 1999	3 years, 134 days
6.	Girija Vyas		15 April 1999	16 January 2004	4 years, 276 days
7.	Narayan Singh Burdak		17 January 2004	12 April 2005	1 year, 85 days
	B. D. Kalla		13 April 2005	24 September 2007	2 years, 164 days
8.	C. P. Joshi		25 September 2007	16 June 2011	3 years, 264 days
9.	Chandrabhan Singh		17 June 2011	20 January 2014	2 years, 217 days
10.	Sachin Pilot		21 January 2014	14 July 2020	6 years, 175 days
11.	Govind Singh Dotasra		15 July 2020	Incumbent	6 years, 0 days

== List of chief ministers of Rajasthan from Indian National Congress ==
Following is the list of the chief ministers of Rajasthan from Indian National Congress:

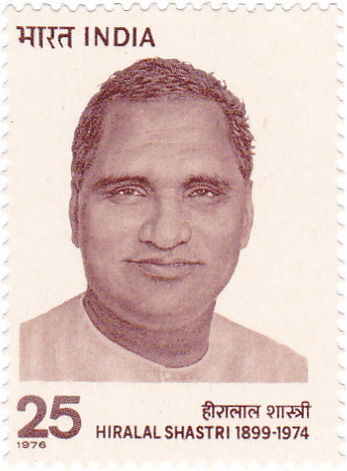
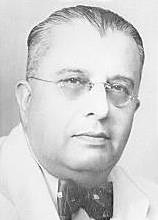
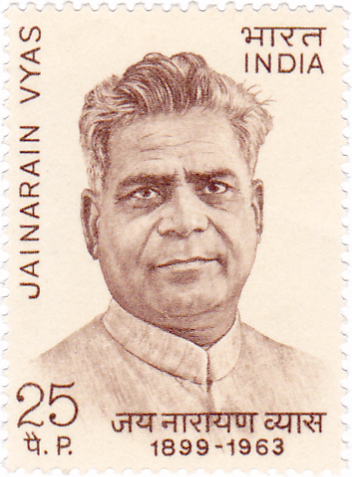
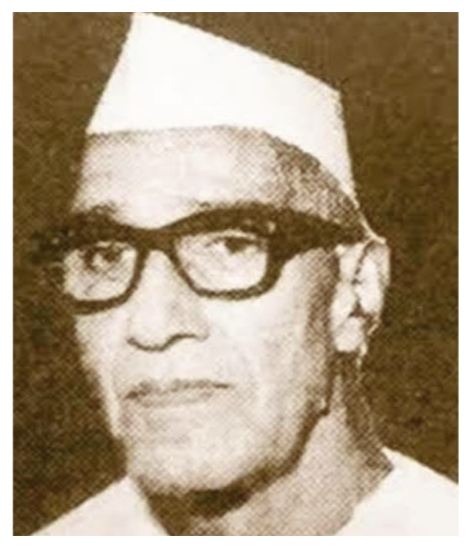
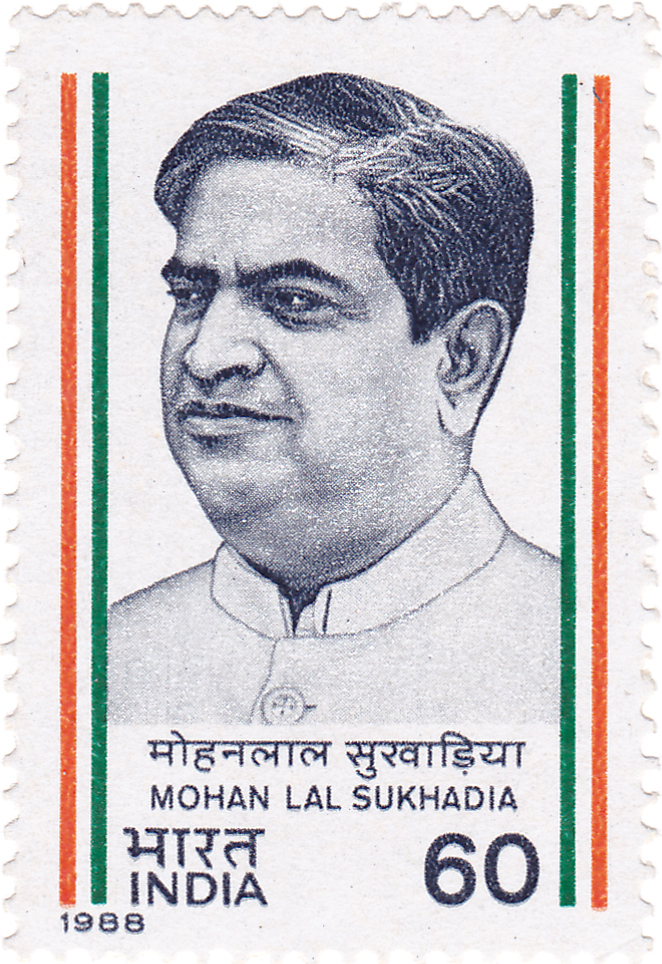
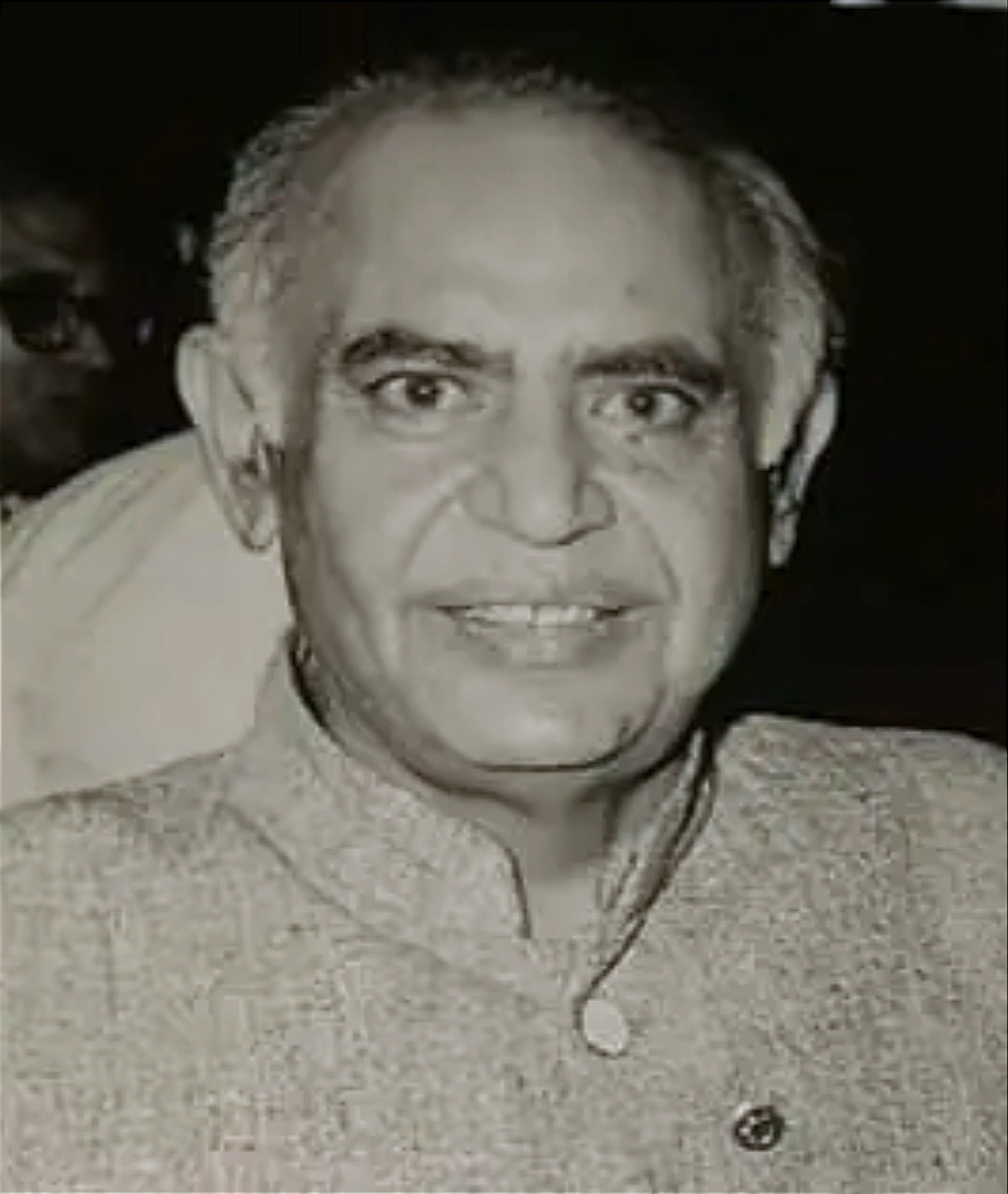
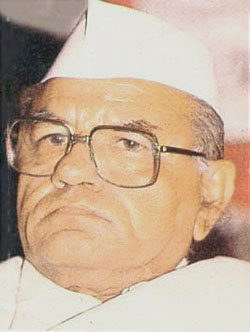
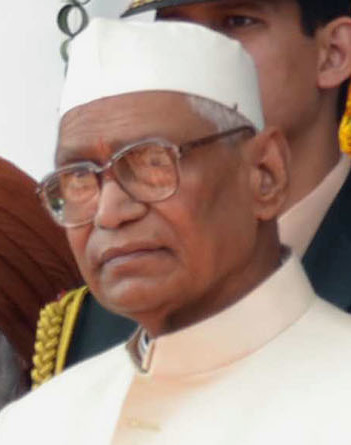
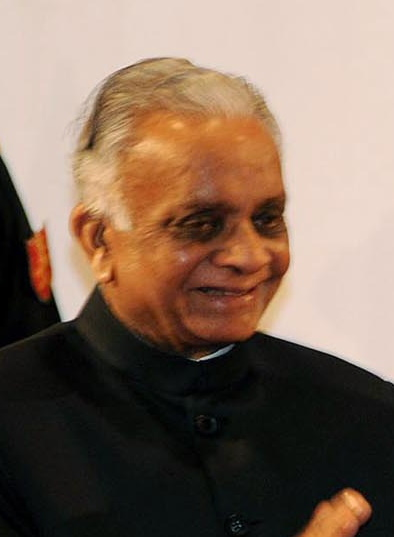
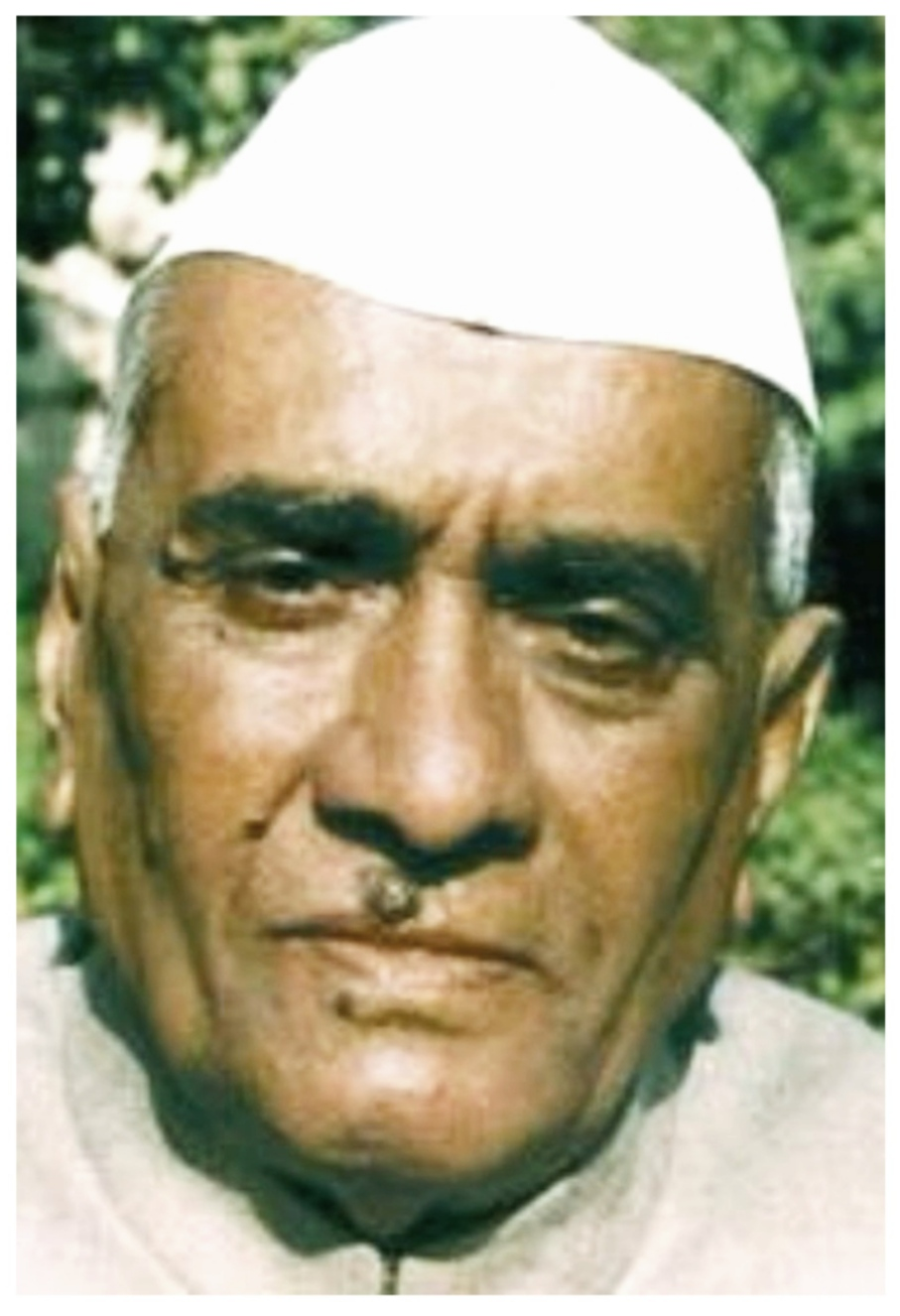
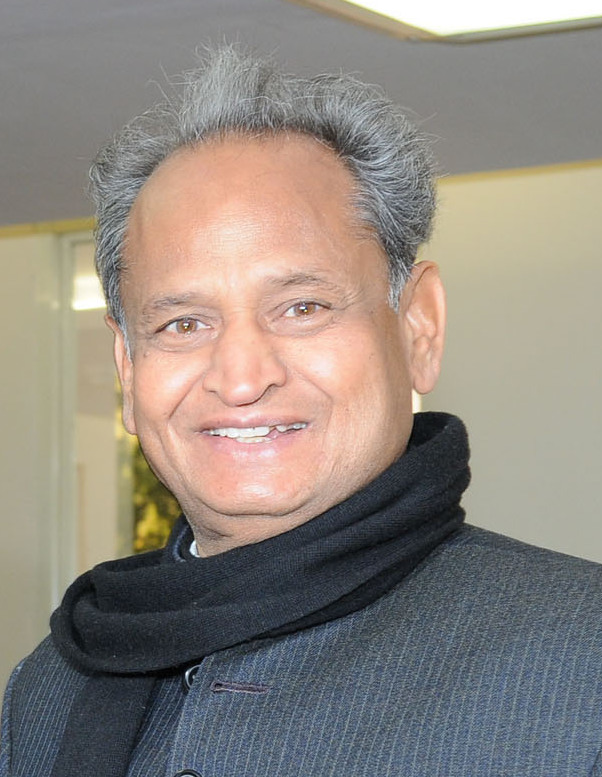
No.	Chief ministers	Portrait	Term in office			Assembly	Constituency
No.	Chief ministers	Portrait	Start	End	Tenure	Assembly	Constituency
1	Heera Lal Shastri		7 April 1949	5 January 1951	1 years, 273 days	Interim Assembly
2	C. S. Venkatachari		6 January 1951	25 April 1951	109 days	Interim Assembly
3	Jai Narayan Vyas		26 April 1951	3 March 1952	2 years, 323 days	1st Assembly	Kishangarh
3	Jai Narayan Vyas		1 November 1952	12 November 1954	2 years, 323 days	2nd Assembly	Kishangarh
4	Tika Ram Paliwal		3 March 1952	31 October 1952	242 days	1st Assembly	Mahuwa
5	Mohan Lal Sukhadia		13 November 1954	13 March 1967	16 years, 194 days	1st, 2nd, 3rd Assembly	Udaipur
5	Mohan Lal Sukhadia		26 April 1967	9 July 1971	16 years, 194 days	4th Assembly	Udaipur
6	Barkatullah Khan		9 July 1971	11 October 1973	2 years, 94 days	5th Assembly	Tijara
7	Hari Dev Joshi		11 October 1973	29 April 1977	6 years, 241 days	5th Assembly	Banswara
7	Hari Dev Joshi		10 March 1985	20 January 1988	6 years, 241 days	8th Assembly	Banswara
7	Hari Dev Joshi		4 December 1989	4 March 1990	6 years, 241 days	8th Assembly	Banswara
8	Jagannath Pahadia		6 June 1980	13 July 1981	1 year, 37 days	7th Assembly	Weir
9	Shiv Charan Mathur		14 July 1981	23 February 1985	5 years, 177 days	7th Assembly	Mandalgarh
9	Shiv Charan Mathur		20 January 1988	4 December 1989	5 years, 177 days	8th Assembly	Mandalgarh
10	Hira Lal Devpura		23 February 1985	10 March 1985	15 days	8th Assembly	Kumbhalgarh
11	Ashok Gehlot		1 December 1998	8 December 2003	10 years, 8 days	11th Assembly	Sardarpura
11	Ashok Gehlot		12 December 2008	13 December 2013	10 years, 8 days	13th Assembly	Sardarpura
11	Ashok Gehlot		15 December 2018	17 December 2023	4 years, 363 days	15th Assembly	Sardarpura

== List of deputy chief ministers of Rajasthan from Indian National Congress ==
Following is the list of the deputy chief ministers of Rajasthan from Indian National Congress:

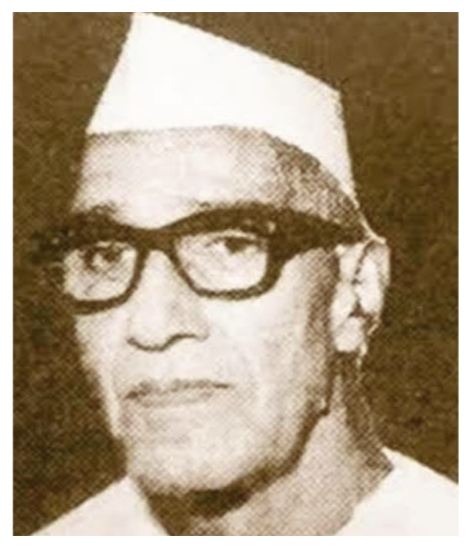
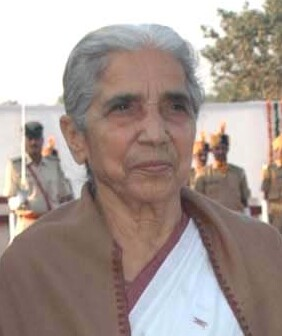
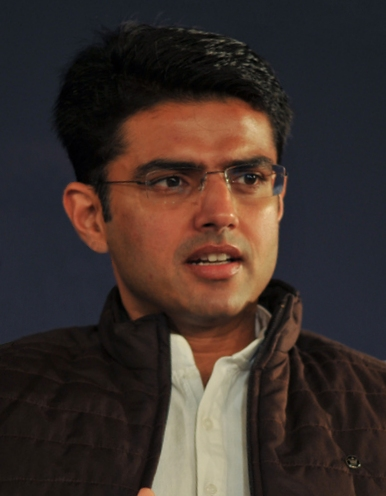
No.	Deputy chief ministers	Portrait	Term in office			Assembly	Constituency	Chief Minister
No.	Deputy chief ministers	Portrait	Start	End	Tenure	Assembly	Constituency	Chief Minister
1	Tika Ram Paliwal		26 March 1951	3 March 1952	2 years, 343 days	1st Assembly	Mahwa	Jai Narayan Vyas
1	Tika Ram Paliwal		1 November 1952	1 November 1954	2 years, 343 days	1st Assembly	Mahwa	Jai Narayan Vyas
2	Banwari Lal Bairwa		25 January 2003	8 December 2003	317 days	11th Assembly		Ashok Gehlot
3	Kamla Beniwal		25 January 2003	8 December 2003	317 days	11th Assembly	Bairath	Ashok Gehlot
4	Sachin Pilot		17 December 2018	14 July 2020	1 year, 210 days	15th Assembly	Tonk	Ashok Gehlot
