= Venkatachar ministry =

Government of Rajasthan, India

- 2nd Ministry of Rajasthan
- Date formed: 6 January 1951
- Date dissolved: 26 April 1951

People and organisations
- Rajpramukh: Sawai Man Singh II
- Chief Minister: C. S. Venkatachar
- Member party: Non-partisan caretaker administration
- Status in legislature: Caretaker government

History
- Legislature term: Interim legislature
- Predecessor: Hiralal Shastri ministry
- Successor: First Vyas ministry

The Venkatachar ministry was a caretaker administration of Rajasthan headed by civil servant C. S. Venkatachar. It served from 6 January to 25 April 1951, between the resignation of Hiralal Shastri and the formation of the first Jai Narayan Vyas ministry.

== Background and tenure ==
The Rajasthan Legislative Assembly archive states that Venkatachar, B. N. Jha and Hari Sharma were included in the cabinet during this interval. The administration operated before the first election to the Rajasthan Legislative Assembly and is therefore generally described as an interim or caretaker government.

== Council of ministers ==
No.	Minister	Rank
1	C. S. Venkatachar	Chief Minister
2	B. N. Jha	Minister
3	Hari Sharma	Minister

== See also ==
- Government of Rajasthan
- Chief Minister of Rajasthan
- Rajasthan Legislative Assembly
