= Paliwal ministry =

Government of Rajasthan, India

- 4th Ministry of Rajasthan
- Date formed: 3 March 1952
- Date dissolved: 1 November 1952

People and organisations
- Rajpramukh: Sawai Man Singh II
- Chief Minister: Tika Ram Paliwal
- Member party: Indian National Congress
- Status in legislature: Majority government
- Opposition party: Ram Rajya Parishad and others
- Opposition leader: Jaswant Singh

History
- Election: 1952 election
- Legislature term: 1st Rajasthan Assembly
- Predecessor: First Vyas ministry
- Successor: Second Vyas ministry

The Paliwal ministry was the council of ministers headed by Tika Ram Paliwal in Rajasthan. Formed on 3 March 1952 after the first state election, it was the first ministry responsible to an elected Rajasthan Legislative Assembly.

== Background and tenure ==
The Indian National Congress held 82 of the Assembly’s 160 seats, while the opposition and other parties held 78. The Assembly archive records an attempted no-confidence motion in October 1952; it was not permitted by a voice vote. Paliwal left office at the end of October and was succeeded by Jai Narayan Vyas.

== Council of ministers ==
No.	Minister	Rank
1	Tika Ram Paliwal	Chief Minister
2	Ram Kishore Vyas	Minister
3	Ram Karan Joshi	Minister
4	Nathu Ram Mirdha	Minister
5	Mohan Lal Sukhadia	Minister
6	Bhogilal Pandya	Minister
7	Bhola Nath	Minister
8	Amrit Lal Yadav	Minister

== See also ==
- Government of Rajasthan
- Chief Minister of Rajasthan
- Rajasthan Legislative Assembly
