= First Vyas ministry =

Government of Rajasthan, India

- 3rd Ministry of Rajasthan
- Date formed: 26 April 1951
- Date dissolved: 3 March 1952

People and organisations
- Rajpramukh: Sawai Man Singh II
- Chief Minister: Jai Narayan Vyas
- Member party: Indian National Congress
- Status in legislature: Interim government

History
- Legislature term: Interim legislature
- Predecessor: Venkatachar ministry
- Successor: Paliwal ministry

The First Vyas ministry was the council of ministers headed by Jai Narayan Vyas in Rajasthan. It took office on 26 April 1951 and continued until 2 March 1952, immediately before Tika Ram Paliwal became the first chief minister following an election to the Rajasthan Legislative Assembly.

== Background and tenure ==
The ministry governed during the final phase before the constitution of the first elected Rajasthan Legislative Assembly. The Assembly archive lists eleven members, including Vyas.

== Council of ministers ==
No.	Minister	Rank
1	Jai Narayan Vyas	Chief Minister
2	Brij Sunder Sharma	Minister
3	Narottam Lal Joshi	Minister
4	Yugal Kishore Chaturvedi	Minister
5	Balwant Singh Mehta	Minister
6	Kumbha Ram Arya	Minister
7	Mohan Lal Sukhadia	Minister
8	Jaswant Singh	Minister
9	Tika Ram Paliwal	Minister
10	Amrit Lal Yadav	Minister
11	Mathura Das Mathur	Minister

== See also ==
- Government of Rajasthan
- Chief Minister of Rajasthan
- Rajasthan Legislative Assembly
