= Hiralal Shastri ministry =

Government of Rajasthan, India

- 1st Ministry of Rajasthan
- Date formed: 7 April 1949
- Date dissolved: 6 January 1951

People and organisations
- Rajpramukh: Sawai Man Singh II
- Prime Minister (to 26 January 1950) Chief Minister: Hiralal Shastri
- Member party: Indian National Congress
- Status in legislature: Interim government

History
- Legislature term: Interim legislature
- Predecessor: Manikya Lal Verma ministry
- Successor: Venkatachar ministry

The Hiralal Shastri ministry was the council of ministers headed by Hiralal Shastri in Greater Rajasthan and, after the commencement of the Constitution of India, the state of Rajasthan. The cabinet took office on 7 April 1949 and remained in office through 5 January 1951; C. S. Venkatachar assumed office the following day.

== Background and tenure ==
Greater Rajasthan was formally inaugurated on 30 March 1949. The cabinet headed by Shastri took office on 7 April, and the Matsya Union was merged into Greater Rajasthan on 15 May 1949. From 26 January 1950, the constitutional designation of the head of government became Chief Minister.

The Rajasthan Legislative Assembly archive records ten members in the cabinet.

== Council of ministers ==
No.	Minister	Rank
1	Hiralal Shastri	Chief Minister
2	Bhure Lal Baya	Minister
3	Raghuver Dayal	Minister
4	Phool Chand Bafana	Minister
5	Narsingha Kachhavaha	Minister
6	Siddha Raj Dhaddha	Minister
7	Vedpal Tyagi	Minister
8	Prem Narayana Mathur	Minister
9	Hanwant Singh of Jodhpur	Minister
10	Shobha Ram	Minister

== See also ==
- Government of Rajasthan
- Chief Minister of Rajasthan
- Rajasthan Legislative Assembly
