= Kamla Beniwal =

Indian politician (1927–2024)

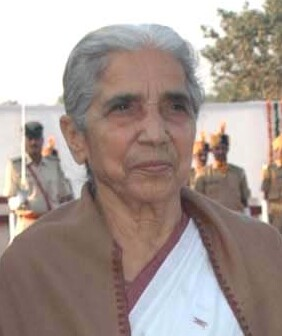
- Beniwal in 2009

Deputy Chief Minister of Rajasthan
- In office 25 January 2003 – 4 December 2003
- Chief Minister: Ashok Gehlot
- Ministry and departments: List: Revenue; Colonization; Sanskrit Education; Irrigation
- Preceded by: Banwari Lal Bairwa
- Succeeded by: Sachin Pilot

Cabinet Minister Government of Rajasthan
- In office 18 June 1980 – 14 July 1981
- Ministry and departments: List: Revenue; Agriculture; Animal Husbandry; Dairy; Prison; Forest; Rehabilitation; Labour; Motor Garage; Indira Gandhi Canal Project; Soldier Welfare Board; Colonization; Ground Water
- Chief Minister: Jagannath Pahadia
- In office 19 July 1981 – 23 February 1985
- Ministry and departments: List: Agriculture; Dairy; Animal Husbandry; Energy; Technical Education; Planning; Primary and Secondary Education; Language; Sanskrit Education
- Chief Minister: Shiv Charan Mathur
- In office 23 February 1985 – 10 March 1985
- Ministry and departments: List: Energy; Planning; Technical Education; Primary and Secondary Education; Language; Sanskrit Education; Devasthan; Waqf
- Chief Minister: Hira Lal Devpura
- In office 11 March 1985 – 20 January 1988
- Ministry and departments: List: Colonization; Land reform; Revenue; Election; Rehabilitation; Linguistic minorities; Indira Gandhi Canal Project; Art, Culture and Archeology; Tourism; Irrigation
- Chief Minister: Hari Dev Joshi
- In office 4 December 1989 – 4 March 1990
- Ministry and departments: List: Agriculture; Urban Development; Town Planning; Autonomous Governance; Housing; Indira Gandhi Canal Project; Colonization; Irrigation
- Chief Minister: Hari Dev Joshi
- In office 5 December 1998 – 25 January 2003
- Ministry and departments: List: Sanskrit Education; Revenue; Irrigation; Colonization
- Chief Minister: Ashok Gehlot

Governor of Gujarat
- In office 27 November 2009 – 6 July 2014
- President: Pratibha Patil
- Preceded by: Nawal Kishore Sharma
- Succeeded by: Om Prakash Kohli

Governor of Mizoram
- In office 9 July 2014 – 6 August 2014
- President: Pranab Mukherjee
- Preceded by: Vakkom Purushothaman
- Succeeded by: Vinod Kumar Duggal

Governor of Tripura
- In office 15 October 2009 – 26 November 2009
- President: Pranab Mukherjee
- Preceded by: Dinesh Nandan Sahay
- Succeeded by: D. Y. Patil

Member of the Rajasthan Legislative Assembly
- In office 1954–1957
- Constituency: Amber, Rajasthan
- In office 1962–1967, 1980–1990, 1995 – 2003
- Constituency: Bairath, Rajasthan
- In office 1972–1977
- Constituency: Dudu, Rajasthan

Personal details
- Born: 12 January 1927 Khetri, Jhunjhunu, Rajasthan
- Died: 15 May 2024 (aged 97) Jaipur, Rajasthan, India
- Party: Indian National Congress
- Spouse: Ramchandra Beniwal
- Children: 5
- Education: Banasthali Vidyapith (B.A.); Maharaja College, Jaipur (M.A.)
- As of 7 April 2025

Kamla Beniwal (Hindi pronunciation: [kəmlaː beːn̪iːʋaːl]; 12 January 1927 – 15 May 2024) was an Indian independence activist and veteran politician who served as the deputy chief minister of Rajasthan. A leader of the Indian National Congress, she was the first female minister and held cabinet ministerial positions in the state government of Rajasthan for more than two decades between 1980 and 2003.

Beniwal was one of the most powerful women politician of Rajasthan as she served as minister for almost 50 years in the state government. She also served as the governor of three states – Tripura, Gujarat, and Mizoram, between 2009 and 2014, becoming the first woman governor of a northeastern state. She was elected to the Rajasthan Legislative Assembly for seven terms between 1954 and 2003. She was honoured with the Tamra Patra from former prime minister Indira Gandhi for her contributions to the freedom struggle.

== Early life and education ==
Beniwal was born on 12 January 1927 in Gorir village, Jhunjhunu district, Rajasthan, into a Hindu Jat family. She was influenced by her father's involvement in the freedom struggle. At the age of 15, she joined the Indian National Congress and participated in the Quit India Movement. She did Bachelor of Arts (B.A.) from Banasthali Vidyapith, and an Master of Arts (M.A.) in History from Maharaja College, Jaipur.

== Career ==
Beniwal's political career began in 1954, when she won the Rajasthan Assembly By-election from the Amber constituency and became a minister in the Government of Rajasthan at the age of 21. She was also the first female minister of Rajasthan. Beniwal was a minister in successive Congress governments in Rajasthan from 1954 onwards, holding various important portfolios including home, medical and health, education and agriculture. She was re-elected multiple times, serving as an MLA for seven terms from various constituencies, primarily Bairath (now Virat Nagar).

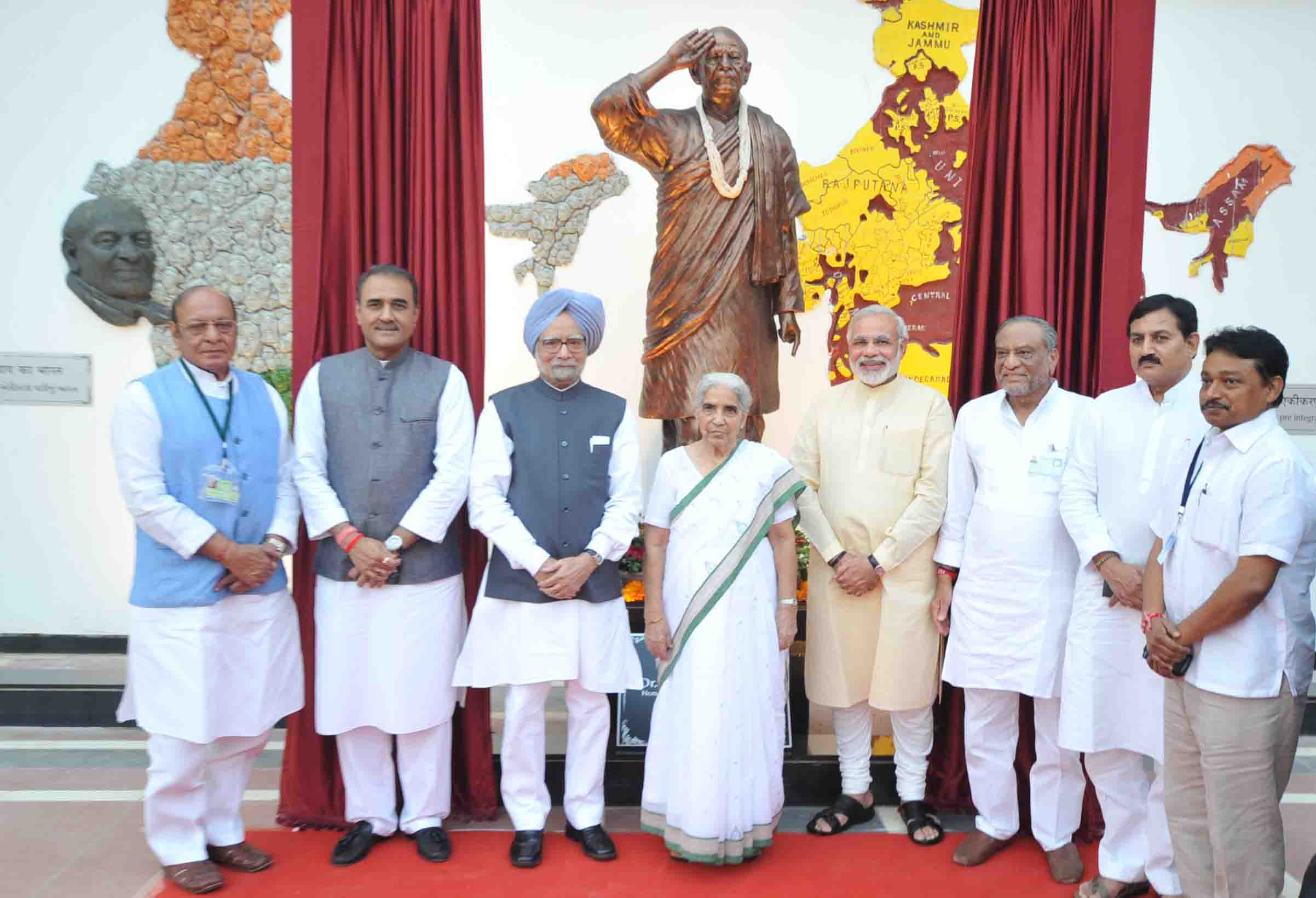
Beniwal along with Manmohan Singh and Narendra Modi

=== Ministerial roles (1954–2003) ===
Beniwal's ministerial career in Rajasthan government spanned nearly five decades, between 1954 and 2003, during which she held a variety of portfolios under multiple Congress-led governments. Her tenure as a minister began at the age of 27, making her the first female minister in Rajasthan politics.

Beniwal initially served as the state minister under Congress government between 1954 and 1980. She became state cabinet minister in 1980 under Jagannath Pahadia ministry. Between 1980 and 2003, Beniwal served as state cabinet minister under various governments such as, Hira Lal Devpura, Shiv Charan Mathur, Hari Dev Joshi and Ashok Gehlot. She held various portfolios under cabinet ministership such as Revenue, Tourism, Agriculture, Colonization, Indira Gandhi Canal Project, Energy, Sanskrit Education, Urban Development, etc.

=== Deputy chief ministership (2003) ===
After serving as state cabinet minister for almost two decades became 4th deputy chief minister of Rajasthan in 2003. Beniwal is also first women deputy chief minister of Rajasthan. Her tenure lasted from 25 January 2003 to 4 December 2003. She held portfolios of Revenue, Colonization, Sanskrit education and Irrigation during deputy chief ministership and at that time Ashok Gehlot was the chief minister.

=== Governorship (2009–2014) ===
Beniwal served as the Governor of Gujarat, Mizoram, and Tripura between 2009 and 2014. She was the first female governor of Tripura and Mizoram. Her tenure as Governor was marked by significant political confrontations, especially during her time in Gujarat under the leadership of then-chief minister Narendra Modi.

Beniwal was appointed as the Governor of Gujarat on 27 November 2009. Her tenure was notable for its strained relations with Narendra Modi's government. Two key controversies defined her governorship:

- Lokayukta Appointment: Beniwal unilaterally appointed retired Justice R.A. Mehta as the Lokayukta of Gujarat in 2011, bypassing the state government. This move led to legal battles, with the Gujarat government challenging her decision in the High Court and later the Supreme Court. The Supreme Court upheld her appointment, though Justice Mehta eventually declined to take up the position.
- Legislative Delays: She withheld assent to certain legislations passed by the Gujarat Assembly, including one providing 50% reservation for women in local bodies. This led to further friction with Modi's administration

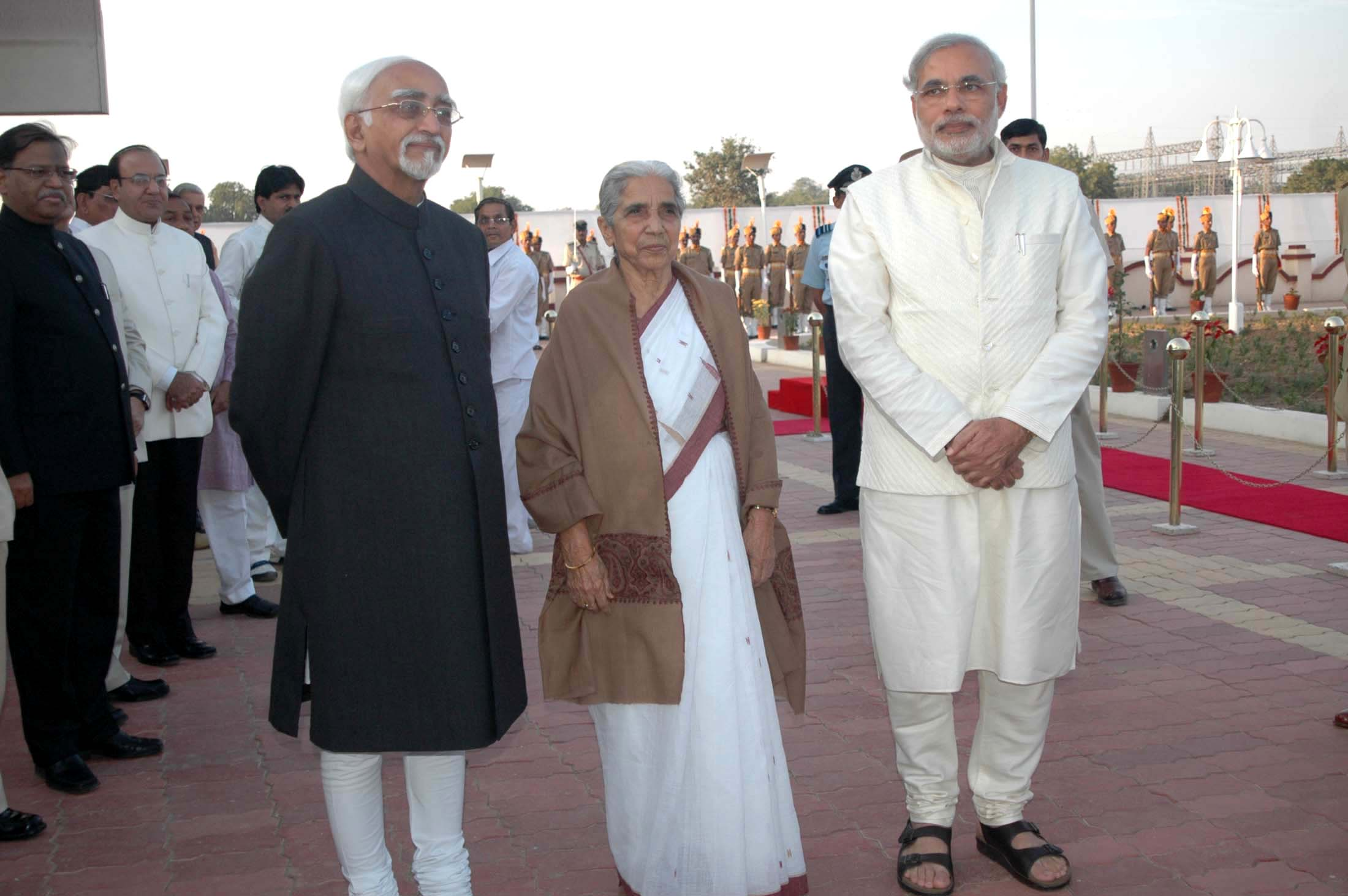
Mohammad Hamid Ansari being received by Beniwal and then Gujarat CM, Narendra Modi

Beniwal's time as Governor of Mizoram was brief and tumultuous. She assumed office on 9 July 2014, but was dismissed just a month later on 6 August 2014. Her removal came two months before her term was set to expire. The official reasons for her dismissal were not disclosed, with union home minister Rajnath Singh declining to comment on the matter. Her removal was seen as a continuation of political tensions stemming from her confrontations with Modi during her tenure in Gujarat.

=== Positions within Congress party ===
Beniwal held several key positions within the Indian National Congress. She served as the president of the Rajasthan Pradesh Mahila Congress, General Secretary of the Jaipur District Rural Congress Committee, and a member of the executive committee of the Jaipur District Rural Congress (I) Committee. Additionally, she was a member of the Pradesh Congress Committee and the Pradesh Executive Committee. From 1977 to 1980, she was also a member of the All India Congress Committee.

== Award and accolades ==
- Women of the Year 2001 – American Biographical Institute
- Vachaspati D.Litt. – Shri Lal Bahadur Shastri National Sanskrit University
- Tamrapatra – by former prime minister Indira Gandhi

== Controversies ==
=== Appointment of Gujarat Lokayukta ===
The Lokayukta is a state-level body for monitoring the government, particularly for corruption. In August 2011, Beniwal appointed Justice R A Mehta as the Lokayukta. She did this under Section 3 of the Gujarat Lokayukta Act, 1986, which gives the governor the right to appoint Lokayukta without consulting the government, when there has been a long delay in making the appointment. In so doing, Beniwal bypassed the Narendra Modi government of Gujarat, which had been sitting on the matter since 2004.

Justice Mehta had been recommended by the Chief Justice of the Gujarat High Court in June 2011, but the government did not act on the suggestion. In August, the father of murdered RTI activist Amit Jethwa filed Public Interest Litigation in the High Court, which then served a show cause notice on the government for the delay in the appointment of the Lokayukta. In response, the Gujarat state cabinet set up a committee of five ministers to look into the matter.

The unilateral action of the governor was challenged in the Gujarat High Court by the government of Gujarat. On 18 January 2012, the Lokyukta appointment was upheld by the court. The next day, the government of Gujarat further appealed to the Supreme Court by filing a special leave petition. On 2 January 2013, the Supreme Court too upheld the appointment, while noting that the Lokayukta post lying vacant for nine years reflected a "very sorry state of affairs". The bench said "the process of consultation by the Governor with the then Chief Justice stood complete, and in such a situation, the appointment of Justice Mehta cannot be held illegal". It noted that the Governor is bound to act under the advice of the Council of Ministers, but the appointment of Justice Mehta is right as it was done in consultation with the Chief Justice of the Gujarat High Court. It also observed that the Governor "has misjudged her role and has insisted that under the Lokayukta Act, the Council of Ministers has no role to play in the appointment of the Lokayukta".

== Death ==
Beniwal died after a brief illness at a private hospital in Jaipur, on 15 May 2024, at the age of 97.
