= List of deputy chief ministers of Rajasthan =

Rajasthan's DCM

Deputy Chief Minister of Rajasthan of Rajasthan
- राजस्थान के उप-मुख्यमंत्री
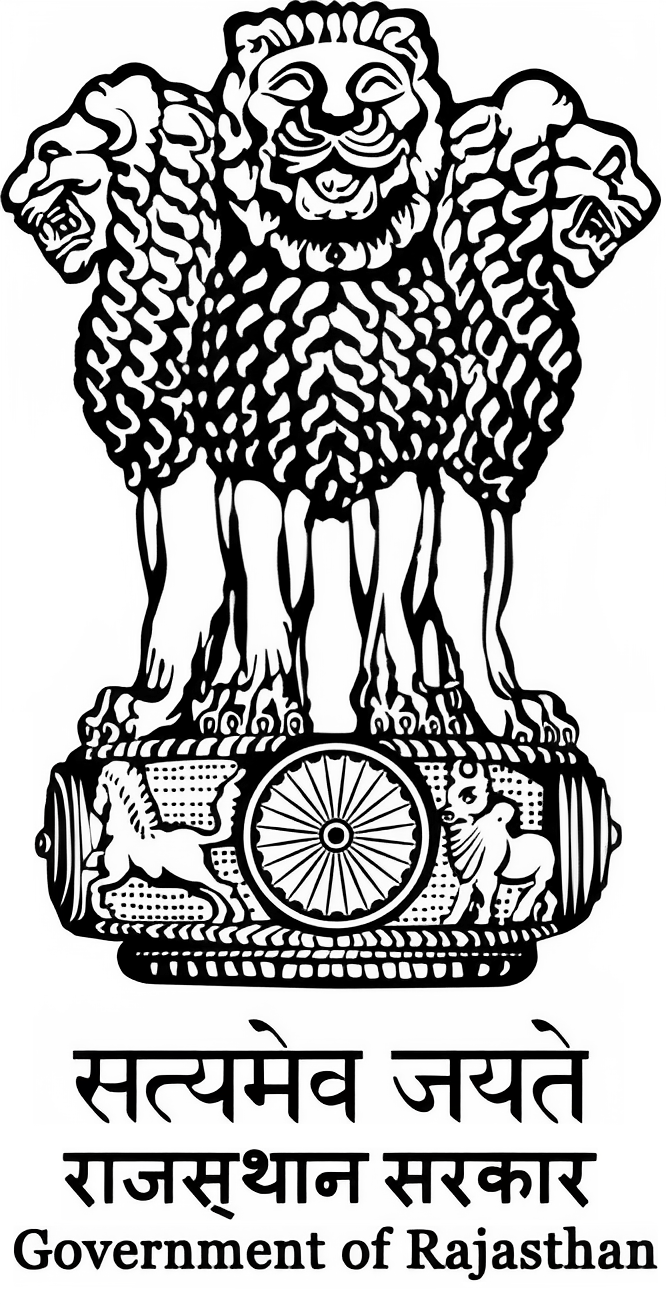
- Emblem of the State of Rajasthan

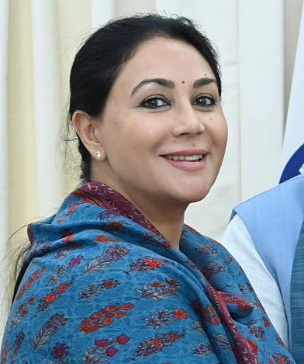
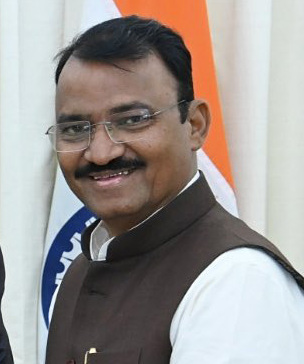
- Incumbent; Diya Kumari and Prem Chand Bairwa since 15 December 2023
- Government of Rajasthan
- Abbreviation: DCM
- Member of: Rajasthan Legislative Assembly; Rajasthan Cabinet
- Reports to: The Chief Minister
- Nominator: Chief Minister of Rajasthan
- Appointer: Governor of Rajasthan
- Inaugural holder: Tika Ram Paliwal
- Website: Rajasthan.gov.in

The deputy chief minister of Rajasthan is a part of the state government of Rajasthan. The position of deputy chief minister is not explicitly defined or mentioned in the Constitution of India. However, the Supreme Court of India has stated that the appointment of deputy chief ministers is not unconstitutional. The court has clarified that a deputy chief minister, for all practical purposes, remains a minister in the council of ministers headed by the chief minister and does not draw a higher salary or perks compared to other ministers.During the absence of the chief minister, the deputy-chief minister may chair cabinet meetings and lead the assembly majority. Various deputy chief ministers have also taken the oath of secrecy in line with the one that chief minister takes. This oath has also sparked controversies.

== List of deputy chief ministers ==
#	Portrait	Name	Constituency	Term of office			Chief Minister	Party
1		Tika Ram Paliwal	Mahuwa	26 March 1951	3 March 1952	2 years, 342 days	Jai Narayan Vyas	Indian National Congress
1		Tika Ram Paliwal	Mahuwa	1 November 1952	1 November 1954	2 years, 342 days	Jai Narayan Vyas	Indian National Congress
2		Hari Shankar Bhabhra	Ratangarh	6 October 1994	29 November 1998	4 years, 54 days	Bhairon Singh Shekhawat	Bharatiya Janata Party
3		Banwari Lal Bairwa	Niwai	25 January 2003	8 December 2003	317 days	Ashok Gehlot	Indian National Congress
3		Kamla Beniwal	Bairath	25 January 2003	8 December 2003	317 days	Ashok Gehlot	Indian National Congress
4		Sachin Pilot	Tonk	17 December 2018	14 July 2020	1 year, 210 days	Ashok Gehlot	Indian National Congress
5		Diya Kumari	Vidhyadhar Nagar	15 December 2023	Incumbent	2 years, 266 days	Bhajan Lal Sharma	Bharatiya Janata Party
5		Prem Chand Bairwa	Dudu	15 December 2023	Incumbent	2 years, 266 days	Bhajan Lal Sharma	Bharatiya Janata Party

== Statistics ==
List of deputy chief ministers by length of term

No.	Name	Party	Length of term	
No.	Name	Party	Longest continuous term	Total years of deputy chief ministership
1	Hari Shankar Bhabhra	BJP	4 years, 54 days	4 years, 54 days
2	Tika Ram Paliwal	INC	2 years, 342 days	2 years, 342 days
3	Sachin Pilot	INC	1 year, 210 days	1 year, 210 days
4	Diya Kumari	BJP	2 years, 266 days	2 years, 266 days
5	Prem Chand Bairwa	BJP	2 years, 266 days	2 years, 266 days
6	Banwari Lal Bairwa	INC	317 days	317 days
7	Kamla Beniwal	INC	317 days	317 days

== Oath as the state deputy chief minister ==
The deputy chief minister serves five years in the office. The following is the oath of the Deputy chief minister of state:

I, <Name of Deputy Chief Minister>, do swear in the name of God/solemnly affirm that I will bear true faith and allegiance to the Constitution of India as by law established, that I will uphold the sovereignty and integrity of India, that I will faithfully and conscientiously discharge my duties as a Minister for the State of () and that I will do right to all manner of people in accordance with the Constitution and the law without fear or favour, affection or ill-will.

Oath of Secrecy

"I, [Name], do swear in the name of God / solemnly affirm that I will not directly or indirectly communicate or reveal to any person or persons any matter which shall be brought under my consideration or shall become known to me as a Minister for the State of [Name of State] except as may be required for the due discharge of my duties as such Minister."Pad ki Shapath (Oath of Office) "Main, [DCM ka Naam], Ishwar ki shapath leta hoon / satyanishtha se pratigyan karta hoon ki main vidhi dwara sthapit Bharat ke Samvidhan ke prati sachi shraddha aur nishtha rakhunga. Main Bharat ki prabhuta aur akhandta akshunn rakhunga. Main [State ka Naam] ke Rajya ke Upa Mukhya Mantri ke roop mein apne kartavyon ka shraddhapoorvak aur shuddh antahkaran se nirvahan karunga, tatha main bhay ya pakshpat, anurag ya dwesh ke bina, sabhi prakar ke logon ke prati Samvidhan aur vidhi ke anusar nyay karunga." B. Gopniyata ki Shapath (Oath of Secrecy) "Main, [DCM ka Naam], Ishwar ki shapath leta hoon / satyanishtha se pratigyan karta hoon ki jo vishay [State ka Naam] ke Rajya ke Mukhya Mantri ke roop mein mere vichar ke liye laya jayega athva mujhe gyaat hoga, use kisi vyakti ya vyaktityon ko, tab ke sivay jab ki aise UpaMukhya Mantri ke roop mein apne kartavyon ke uchit nirvahan ke liye aisa karna apekshit ho, main pratyaksh (directly) ya apratyaksh (indirectly) roop mein sansuchit ya prakat nahi karunga."
