= Kisan Janata Sanyukta Party =

The Kisan Janata Sanyukta Party was a political party in Rajasthan, India. In August 1951 the former Chief Minister Hiralal Shastri joined the party, following his resignation from the Indian National Congress. The party united Shastri and candidates of the Jaipur Kisan Sabha. Shastri abandoned the party and reunited with the Congress Party as he and nine of his associates were offered Congress tickets to contest the elections.

The party fielded a single candidate in the 1951 Lok Sabha election, Raghubar Dayal in the Bikaner Churu constituency. Dayal obtained 6,390 votes (3.41% of the votes in the constituency). The party fielded six candidates in the 1952 Rajasthan legislative assembly election, whom together obtained 7,164 votes.
