= Hari Shankar Bhabhra =

Indian politician (1928–2024)

Deputy Chief Minister of Rajasthan
- In office 6 October 1994 – 1 December 1998
- Chief Minister: Bhairon Singh Shekhawat

Speaker of the Rajasthan Legislative Assembly
- In office 16 March 1990 – 5 October 1994
- Preceded by: Giriraj Prasad Tiwari
- Succeeded by: Shanti Lal Chaplot

Member of Rajasthan Legislative Assembly
- In office 1985–1998
- Preceded by: Jaidev Prasad Indoria
- Succeeded by: Jaidev Prasad Indoria
- Constituency: Ratangarh

Member of Parliament, Rajya Sabha
- In office 10 April 1978 – 9 April 1984
- Constituency: Rajasthan

Personal details
- Born: 6 August 1928
- Died: 25 January 2024 (aged 95) Jaipur, Rajasthan, India
- Party: Bharatiya Janata Party
- Education: Bachelor of Arts; Bachelor of Laws

Hari Shankar Bhabhra (6 August 1928 – 25 January 2024) was an Indian politician who was speaker of the Rajasthan legislative assembly. He attained the office of the Speaker from 16 March 1990 to 5 October 1994 (two times). He won the state legislative elections in 1985, 1990, and 1993 from Ratangarh in Churu district. A resident of Didwana in Nagaur district, he contested and won from Ratangarh constituency of Churu District. He was a state leader of the Bharatiya Janata Party. He was also Deputy Chief Minister of Rajasthan from 6 October 1994 to 1 December 1998. Bhabhra was the deputy chairperson of Economic Policy and Reform Council in the Rajasthan Government. He was a member of the Rajya Sabha from 1978 to 1984. Bhabhra died on 25 January 2024, at the age of 95.
