= Ushi Khan =

Indian politician

Member of Parliament, Rajya Sabha
- In office 1976–1982
- Constituency: Rajasthan

Personal details
- Born: 24 December 1935
- Died: 10 September 2014 (aged 78)
- Party: Indian National Congress
- Spouse: Barkatullah Khan

Ushi Khan (24 December 1935 – 10 September 2014) was an Indian politician. She was a Member of Parliament, representing Rajasthan in the Rajya Sabha the upper house of India's Parliament as a member of the INC.
