= Ratan Shastri =

Founder of Banasthali Vidyapith

Ratan Shastri, also called Ratandevi Shastri, was founder of Banasthali Vidyapith and a notable champion of women education. She was a notable woman freedom fighter of Rajputana and wife of Hiralal Shastri, first Chief Minister of Rajasthan. She was a recipient of Padma Shri in 1955, Padma Bhushan in 1975, and Jamnalal Bajaj Award for outstanding contribution in the field of uplift and welfare of women and children in 1990. Ratan Shastri was a strong pillar of Parajamandal Movement in Jaipur state during the Indian national Movement. She was a champion of female education and started a women's school, that later developed into a university, that contributed immensely to encourage and support female education in Rajasthan. She was a staunch adherent of Gandhian ideals and promoted Khadi.

== Life and Contribution ==
Ratan Shastri was born on 5 October 1912 in Madhya Pradesh. Her early education was in Kanya Pathshala in Ratlam. In 1924, she married Hiralal Shastri. Hiralal Shastri was a man committed to the cause of India's freedom and relinquished his prestigious office in the government of princely state of Jaipur. Not only Ratan Shastri but her parental family supported the young man and the wider nationalist cause.

=== Gandhian Ideals ===
Ratan Shastri converted to the simple and frugal lifestyle as she embraced Gandhian ideals. Despite, coming from an affluent family, she dressed in coarse khadi fabric and ensured that her children also wore Khadi. She sold off all her jewellery and contrary to the mores of the Indian society for a married women did not keep even a nose ring on herself.

=== Freedom Movement ===
Ratan Shastri was quite active in the Prajamnadal Movement of Jaipur state that had been revived by her husband and other political leaders. In 1939, Jaipur state arrested several leaders. In these circumstances, Ratan Shastri rose to the occasion and played a more active and leadership role. She organised and mobilised the agitations and became an inspiration for the Satyagrahis.

=== Inspiration ===
Beside her active engagement, her institution Banasthali Vidyapith mobilised the students to execute supportive activities for the movement. She played a great part in inculcating the values of nationalism, activism, and patriotism in the younger generation.

== Bansthali Vidyapith ==
Inspired by the dream of her deceased daughter, Ratan Shastri started a school for girls on 6 October 1935. It was named Shri Shantabai shiksha Kutir in memory of her daughter. In its second year, the name was changed to ShriRajasthan Balika Vidyalaya. In 1943, when BA programme was introduced, its name became Banasthali Vidyapith. In 1983, this institution has been granted the status of deemed university by University Grants Commission.

== Legacy ==
Bansthali Vidyapith emphasised holistic education and instilled confidence in girls. Many politicians, educationists, and freedom fighters of Rajasthan were former students of this institution like Kamla Swadhin, Geeta Bajaj etc. Ratan Shastri remained a maternal figure and inspiration for her students who fondly called her Bhabhuji throughout their lives. She died in 1998 at the age of 86.
