= Banasthali Vidyapith =

Indian private deemed university in Rajasthan

- Motto: University for Women: University with a change
- Type: Private
- Established: 6 October 1935; 90 years ago
- Founders: Hiralal Shastri; Ratan Shastri
- Affiliations: UGC
- Chancellor: Siddharth Shastri
- Vice-Chancellor: Ina Aditya Shastri
- Location: Tonk district, Rajasthan, India; 26.38°N 75.855278°E
- Campus: Rural, more than 850 acres (3.4 km^{2})
- Website: www.banasthali.org

Banasthali Vidyapith, also known as Banasthali University, is a private women's university located in Tonk district, Rajasthan, India. The university offers programs at the secondary, senior secondary, undergraduate, and postgraduate degree levels.

== History ==
Banasthali Vidyapith was founded on 6 October 1935 by freedom fighters and educationists, Hiralal Shastri and Ratan Shastri. The institution was declared as a 'deemed university' in 1983. While NAAC re-accredited Banasthali Vidyapith at the highest possible ‘Grade A’ level in 2011, the Review Committee (Tandon Committee) of Ministry of HRD also appreciated the overall efforts of Vidyapith in the areas of Institutional Governance, Academic Achievements, Research, Student Progression, Infrastructure etc. and categorized Banasthali Vidyapith under ‘Category A’ list of ‘Institutions Deemed to be University’ in 2010. The university is featured in NIRF, QS I Gauge, and Times Higher Education rankings. In 2020, NAAC accredited this university with an A++ grade.

The Vidyapith has had virtual autonomy for its school programs since the beginning and was affiliated with an outside agency for its university programs in 1983. In 1983, the Government of India, on the advice of the University Grants Commission, elevated the Vidyapith as an institution deemed to be a university.

Along with professional programs such as MBA and MCA, all postgraduate courses in the faculty of science have a semester based system. Since 2004, all social science, humanities, and home science post-graduate programs are running as semester courses.

== Campus ==
The campus sprawls across 850 acres, located about 80 kilometers from the capital city of Jaipur, in the Tonk district of Rajasthan, India. The campus has been broadly divided into the school division, the university division, and the residential blocks. The residential blocks feature 29 hostels each with the capacity of housing up to 438 students.

The Laxmi Bai Maidan (field) which is approximately 2660 square km. is used for parades and annual fairs, whereas the Vidula Maidan (4195 sq. km. approx.) has fields for games such as hockey, volleyball, tennis, yoga, martial arts and mass physical display activities. The Veer Bala Maidan is used for horse riding and the Shakuntlam Playground is the cricket ground of the campus. The campus also features a swimming pool. The campus also features a licensed air field with a runway length of about 1 km, which is used to train the students in flying and guiding. Banasthali Vidyapith also features its own hospital called Apaji Arogya Mandir, a guest house for parents and official guests, and a community radio station called Radio Banasthali.

== Organization and administration ==
=== Management ===
The main statutory bodies of Banasthali Vidyapith are:

- General Council
- Executive Council
- Finance Council
- Academic Council

=== Officers ===
- President/Chancellor
- Vice-President
- Vice-Chancellor
- Pro Vice-Chancellor
- Treasurer
- Secretary
- Deans, including Deans/Heads of the Centres of Higher Education
- Co-ordinator, School Education

== Academics ==
=== Academic programmes ===
==== School Education ====
Banasthali Vidyapith provides school education from elementary to senior secondary. At the senior secondary level, the student can opt for Science, Commerce, or Humanities as their stream.

==== Undergraduate programs ====
The university offers 18 undergraduate programs in the disciplines of Mathematics, Science, Management, Commerce, Arts, Engineering, Aviation, Education, Design, Law, and Journalism. All the programs are of three-year duration except for the Bachelor of Education (B.Ed) which is 2 years, BA LLB which is 5 years, and the Bachelor of Technology (B.Tech) which is 4 years.

==== Postgraduate Programs ====
The university offers 61 master's programs and 32 Doctorates in the disciplines of Humanities, Social Sciences, Sciences, Law, Education, Commerce and Management.

=== Accreditation ===
The National Assessment and Accreditation Council (NAAC) accredited Banasthali University with an ‘A++' grade. The Ministry of HRD has listed the university under the top 'MHRD A Category.

=== Atal Incubation Center ===
Banasthali Vidyapith has partnered with Atal Innovation Mission, NITI Aayog to establish first of its kind women Atal Incubation Centre.

=== National Resource Center in Management ===
MHRD has set up a Center of Excellence in Management at Banasthali Vidyapith to develop an Annual Refresher Program in Teaching. The online modules are hosted by SWAYAM Portal.

=== Rankings ===
University rankings

General – India
- NIRF (Overall) (2023): 97
- NIRF (Universities) (2023): 58

Engineering – India
- NIRF (2024): 78

Pharmacy – India
- NIRF (2024): 28

The National Institutional Ranking Framework (NIRF) ranked Banasthali Vidyapith 97th overall in India in 2023, 58th among universities, and 23 in the pharmacy ranking.

== Notable alumni ==
- Atiqa Bano, educationist and activist
- Avani Chaturvedi, India's first female combat pilot
- Hemlata Talesra, professor, educationalist, and activist
- Kamla Beniwal, governor of Gujarat
- Meira Kumar, Speaker of Lok Sabha
- Sudesh Dhankar, Second Lady of India
- Sumitra Singh, Former Speaker, Rajasthan Legislative Assembly
- Sunita Godara, marathon runner
- Yashoda Devi, a former Member of the Legislative Assembly
