= Raja Man Singh (politician) =

Indian politician

Raja Maan Singh
- Born: 5 December 1921
- Died: 21 February 1985 (aged 63); Deeg, Bharatpur, Rajasthan
- Cause of death: Killed in encounter
- Occupation: Politician
- Title: Member of Legislative Assembly
- Term: 1952 to 1984
- Political party: Independent
- Children: Krishnendra Kaur Deepa (daughter)
- Father: Kishan Singh of Bharatpur

Raja Maan Singh (born 5 December 1921 – died 21 February 1985) was an Indian politician and titular head of Jats princely Bharatpur State. He was seven-time Independent Member of Legislative Assembly from Deeg assembly constituency from 1952 to 1984. He was the son of Kishan Singh of Bharatpur.

== Death controversy ==
He was killed along with his two supporters in a fake police encounter in February 1985 after an incident of violence in which Rajasthan's then chief minister Shiv Charan Mathur's helicopter was damaged. His murder case was investigated by the CBI. Singh's murder led to the resignation of CM Shiv Charan Mathur. On 20 July 2020, a special CBI court in Mathura convicted 11 policemen, including former Deputy Superintendent of Police Kan Singh Bhati in Raja Man Singh's murder case.
