= Mohan Lal Sukhadia =

5th Chief Minister of Rajasthan

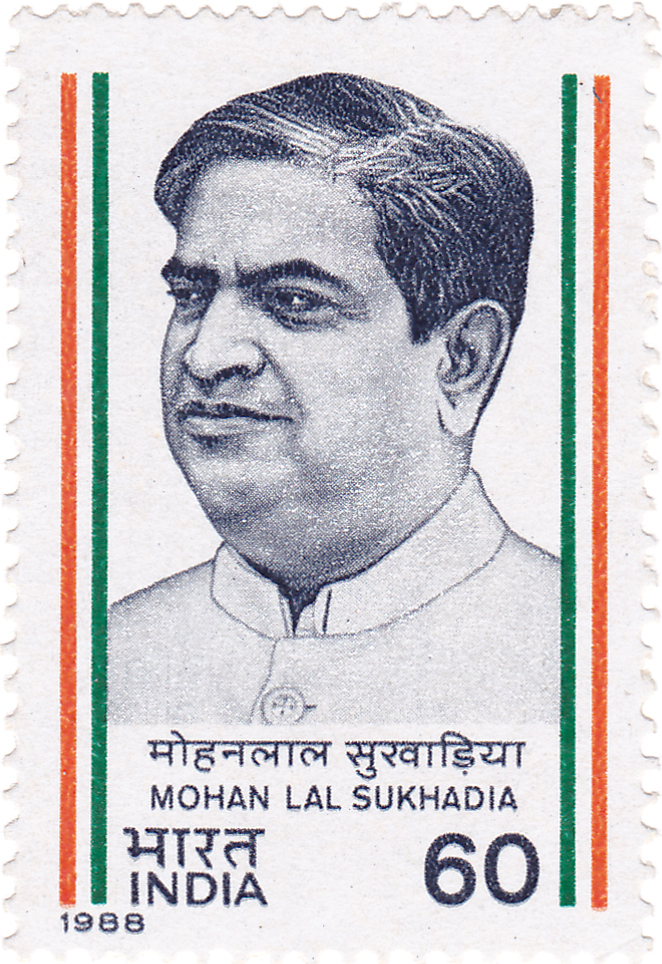

3rd Governor of Tamil Nadu
- In office 16 June 1976 – 8 April 1977
- Chief Minister: M. G. Ramachandran
- Preceded by: Kodardas Kalidas Shah
- Succeeded by: P. Govindan Nair (Acting)

7th Governor of Andhra Pradesh
- In office 10 January 1976 – 16 June 1976
- Chief Minister: Jalagam Vengala Rao
- Preceded by: S. Obul Reddy
- Succeeded by: R. D. Bhandare

1st Governor of Karnataka
- In office 1 November 1973 – 10 October 1975
- Chief Minister: D. Devaraj Urs
- Preceded by: Office Established
- Succeeded by: Uma Shankar Dikshit

6th Governor of Mysore
- In office 1 February 1972 – 31 October 1973
- Chief Minister: D. Devaraj Urs
- Preceded by: Dharma Vira
- Succeeded by: office abolished

5th Chief Minister of Rajasthan
- In office 26 April 1967 – 9 July 1971
- Governor: Sardar Hukam Singh; Jagat Narian
- Preceded by: President's rule
- Succeeded by: Barkatullah Khan
- In office 13 November 1954 – 13 March 1967
- Governor: Sir Man Singh II; Gurmukh Nihal Singh; Sampurnanand
- Preceded by: Jai Narayan Vyas
- Succeeded by: President's rule

Personal details
- Born: 31 July 1916 Jhalawar, Jhalawar State, British India
- Died: 2 February 1982 (aged 65) Bikaner, Rajasthan, India
- Party: Indian National Congress
- Spouse: Indubala Sukhadia

Mohan Lal Sukhadia (31 July 1916 – 2 February 1982) was an Indian politician, who served as the Chief Minister of Rajasthan state for 17 years (1954–1971). He became chief minister at the age of 38 and was responsible for bringing major reforms and developments in Rajasthan. For this, he is still widely revered as the "founder of modern Rajasthan".

Later in his career, Sukhadia also served as the Governor of Karnataka, Andhra Pradesh and Tamil Nadu.

== Early life ==
Mohan Lal Sukhadia was born in a Jain family of Jhalawar, Rajasthan. His father, Purushottam Das Sukhadia, was a well known cricketer of the Bombay and Saurashtra teams.

After completing primary education in Nathdwara and Udaipur, Sukhadia went to Mumbai for a diploma in electrical engineering from VJTI. There, he was elected General Secretary of the student body. Mr. Berley, the British principal of the college, wanted to invite governor of Bombay in a college ceremony. Sukhadia, along with other students, vehemently opposed the idea and asserted to invite then Chief Minister of Bombay B. G. Kher instead. Finally, college authorities had to bow down against the demands of students. Sukhadia had successfully led his first revolt against British Rule exemplifying his uncanny leadership abilities and managerial skills.

In college, he came in contact with prominent national leaders like Subhas Chandra Bose, Sardar Vallabhbhai Patel, Yusuf Meherally and Ashok Mehta. Sukhadia regularly attended meetings of Congress workers and volunteers headed by Patel in Mumbai.

When he came back to Nathdwara, he started a small electrical workshop. This shop was essentially a meeting place where Sukhadia and his friends would discuss about the ubiquitous autocracies of British rule and socio-economic reforms in the region. Various education and social awareness programs were schemed and executed in the region by Sukhadia and his fellow workers.

He married Indubala on 1 June 1938 in Beawar. This inter-caste marriage was not an ordinary event in those days. Expecting a stiff backlash in Nathdwara and Udaipur, Sukhadia decided to perform the ceremony in Beawar adhering to customs of the Arya Samaj. When he returned to Nathdwara with Indubala, he was hailed by a large number of his supporters. Young overjoyed supporters thronged the streets of Nathwara, steered a huge rally across the town and greeted him with slogans, "Mohan Bhaiya Jindabad". This remained to be one of the most memorable and inspiring moments of his life. Sukhadia himself acknowledged this fact to one of his protagonists a few days before his death.

== Contribution in freedom struggle ==
On account of excessive taxes and autocratic rule of princes and jagirdars, Praja Mandals were formed in different states of Rajputana. These mandals provided wider base to the agitation and direction to the civil right movement and administrative reforms in various princely states. In Udaipur state, Mewar Praja Mandal was founded in 1938 having renowned social activist and freedom fighter Manikya Lal Verma as its president. After one year of foundation, Mandal received a dose of fresh vigor with promising youth Mohal Lal Sukhadia joining it.

== Independence and participation in government ==
On 15 August 1947, 22 princely states of Rajasthan (erstwhile Rajputana) agreed to join the Union of India. Their merger and unification took place in a phased manner over a period of 2 years.

In the first phase, on 18 March 1948, four Princely States of Alwar, Bharatpur, Dholpur and Karauli formed the Matsya Union. On 25 March 1948, Union of Rajasthan was formed comprising Banswara, Bundi, Dungarpur, Jhalawar, Kishangarh, Pratapgarh, Shahapura, Tonk, and Kota. Three days after formation of Union of Rajasthan, Maharana of Udaipur decided to join Union of Rajasthan on 28 March 1948. It was formally inaugurated by Pt. Jawaharlal Nehru on 18 April 1948 and cabinet was formed under the leadership of Manikya Lal Verma. Mohan Lal Sukhadia joined the cabinet as Irrigation and Labor Minister.

In the fourth phase, states of Bikaner, Jaisalmer, Jaipur and Jodhpur merged with Union of Rajasthan. Sardar Patel inaugurated unified Rajasthan on 30 March 1949 and Heera Lal Shastri formed the cabinet to become first Chief Minister of Rajasthan. On 15 May 1949, Matsya Union also merged with Rajasthan.

After Heera Lal Shasrti resigned from the post on 26 March 1951, Jai Narayan Vyas took over his post. Sukhadia was appointed as minister in newly created cabinet. First state Legislative elections of Rajasthan were held in 1952. Tika Ram Paliwal became Chief Minister on 3 March 1952 for a brief period of time. Jai Narayan Vyas replaced him on 1 November 1952. Sukhadia handled Revenue, Irrigation, Agriculture and other significant portfolios during this period.

After elections in 1952, 22 members of Ram Rajya Parishad joined Congress Party on persuasion of Jai Narayan Vyas. However, congress workers objected to his decision as most of the Ram Rajya Parishad members were former zamindars and believed this would affect ongoing land reforms in the state. Amidst growing resentment against Jai Narayan Vyas, Congress High command directed him to seek Vote of Confidence of Congress legislative members.

Veteran Jai Narayan Vyas was directly pitched against the 38-year-old Revenue Minister of his own cabinet, Shri Mohan Lal Sukhadia. First time in history of Democratic India, two people were openly contesting for post of Chief Minister. Sukhadia defeated him by 8 votes to become youngest Chief Minister of India. He continued on this post for record making 17 years (13 November 1954 – 8 July 1971). His record of longest-serving Chief Minister in Indian political history was untouched until Jyoti Basu surpassed it in 1994.

== Sukhadia era of Rajasthan politics ==
=== Founding and development of Rajasthan Congress ===
Formation of Rajasthan Congress started in 1946 when Praja Mandals of various states merged into the Rajputana Prantiya Sabha to form a common decision making and organization framework. Mohan Lal Sukhadia was one of the fifteen members of Executive Committee of Prantiya Sabha that consisted of prominent political elites of Rajasthan. Sukhadia along with other members of this committee played the crucial role of formulating and publicizing the policies and resolutions of the party.

Desire for the inclusion of party in Indian National Congress was finally realized in April 1948 at the Bombay session of All-India Congress organization, when Rajputana Prantiya Sabha was declared as one of the provincial units of Indian national Congress.

Initial years were impaired by instability within the party, which witnessed four chief ministers in less than first six years (1948–1954), until Sukhadia was given the responsibility of leading the government. Major credit for deploying stability and institutionalization in Congress party goes to leadership abilities and political skills of Mohanlal Sukhadia. Serving on the post of Chief Minister for almost two decades clearly denotes the kind of support, affection and honor Sukahdia enjoyed from his party members and public.

=== Land reforms in the state ===
Zamindari system, which had prevailed in Rajasthan for centuries, percolated deeply in socio-economic system of the state by the time of independence. Poor peasants were subjected to atrocities of their zamindars, had no right on the land they tilled and often had to pay very high land revenues.

Congress government under the leadership of Jawaharlal Nehru passed a law to abolish the zamindari system. Impact of law was very limited in beginning years as zamindars approached the Supreme Court challenging the orders. To come up with the backdrop, the Congress Government passed the Rajasthan Jagir Abolition Act in 1952. With this Act, Jagirdari system in the state was abolished and the power of judicial review over these legislations was taken away from the courts and the fundamental right to the property was amended. Sukhadia was given the challenging post of Revenue Minister in the cabinet, reckoning that land reforms would not be easy without establishing an efficient or uniform system of revenue administration.

When Sukhadia took over as Chief Minister in 1954, the challenging task of implementing the reforms lay ahead of him. Sukhadia's government passed Rajasthan Zamindari and Biswedari Abolition Act in 1959 that transferred the title of land to the tenants, doing away with centuries-old zamindari system in Rajasthan.

Factors like political influence of jagirdars and jamindars, confusing varieties of land system in the different princely states and lack of reliable land records made the implementation immensely difficult. Sukhadia confronted all these hindrances and led land reforms in the state successfully.

=== Development in health and education sector ===
In his famous tryst with destiny speech, India's first prime minister Jawaharlal Nehru declared the eradication of ‘ignorance and disease’ as one of the most crucial tasks that the country faced. Challenge to eradicate ‘ignorance and disease’ was even bigger in Rajasthan as this was one of the least developed states in India at the end of British rule. During the early decades of the twentieth century Rajasthan had one of the lowest levels of education and highest levels of mortality of all provinces in India.

Sukhadia Era in Rajasthan witnessed a dramatic reversal of the colonial policy of almost complete neglect of the education and health sectors. Sukhadia government's commitment to the social sector is brought out by the fact that despite facing a very precarious budgetary situation, it steadily increased its expenditure on social service. One of the clearest signals of this was decision of Sukhadia to retain the Education portfolio even after becoming the Chief Minister of the state.

Results were evident by the end of 1970. Rajasthan's outlays on health and education were significantly higher than all other North-Central Indian states and all-India average. By 1969 Rajasthan's education spending as a proportion of total SDP (3.2%) was double that of UP (1.5%). Similarly, in the health sector, Rajasthan's expenditure grew to Rs.8.23 per capita in 1970–71 whereas UP spent only Rs.3.2.

== Bibliography ==
- Kochar, Kanhiyya Lal (1999), Rajasthan mein Swatantrata Sangram Ke Amar Purodha : Mohan Lal Sukhadia, Rajasthan Swarn Jyanthi Samaroh Samiti
- Sisson, Richard (1972), The Congress Party in Rajasthan, University of California Press, ISBN 0-520-01808-7
- Sharma, Shalendra (1999), Development and Democracy in India, Lynne Rienner Publishers, ISBN 1-55587-810-5
- Ralhan, O. P. (2002), Encyclopaedia of Political Parties, Anmol Publications PVT. LTD., ISBN 81-7488-865-9
- Chabda, Praveen Chandra; Mishra, R K (1964), Rajasthan - A decade of Reconstruction, Pratibha Publication, Jaipur
- Sukhadia, Mohanlal (1962), Our Administrative Problems, Information Department, Rajasthan Government
- Saxena, Shankar Sahay (1960), Joh Desh Ke Liye Jiye (Jashogatha Loknayak Shri Maniklal Verma), Muktiwani Publication
- Devi, Maharani Gayatri (1976), A Princess Remembers - The Memorial of Maharani of Jaipur, Vikas Publishing House

Government offices
Preceded by S. Obul Reddy	Governor of Andhra Pradesh; 1976–1976	Succeeded by R. D. Bhandare
