= 1952 Rajasthan Legislative Assembly election =

Election in Indian state

- 19 February 1952

All 160 seats in the Rajasthan Legislative Assembly 81 seats needed for a majority
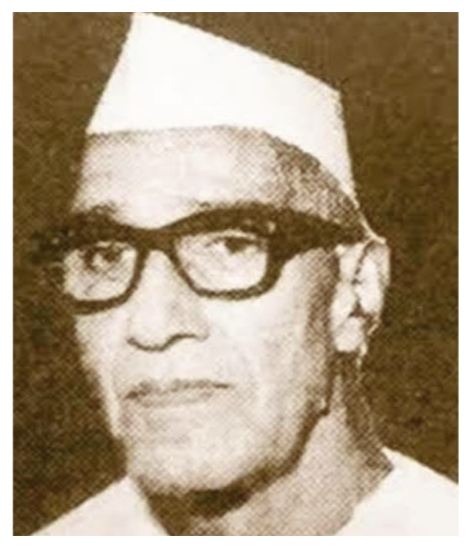
	Majority party	Minority party
		RRP
Leader	Tika Ram Paliwal
Party	INC	RRP
Leader's seat	Mahuwa
Seats won	82	24
Popular vote	1,286,953	399,958
Percentage	39.46%	12.26%
CM before election
Jai Narayan Vyas
INC
Elected CM
Tika Ram Paliwal
INC

Indian administrative divisions, as of 1951

Elections to the Rajasthan Legislative Assembly were held on 29 February 1952. 616 candidates contested for the 140 constituencies in the Assembly. There were 20 two-member constituencies and 120 single-member constituencies.

== Results ==
Party	Votes	%	Seats
Indian National Congress	1,286,953	39.46	82
Ram Rajya Parishad	399,958	12.26	24
Krishikar Lok Party	270,807	8.30	7
Bharatiya Jana Sangh	193,532	5.93	8
Socialist Party	135,971	4.17	1
Hindu Mahasabha	28,183	0.86	2
Communist Party of India	17,181	0.53	0
Kisan Mazdoor Praja Party	16,411	0.50	1
Independent	896,671	27.49	35
Others	15,775	0.48	0
Total	3,261,442	100.00	160

Congress, with a slim majority of 82 seats, formed a government with Tika Ram Paliwal as the first elected chief minister of Rajasthan. While the leftist parties were the main opposition in India that time, they performed very poorly, barely getting 5% votes polled. The far-right Ram Rajya Parishad served as the main opposition party.

On 1 November 1956, under States Reorganisation Act, 1956, the Ajmer State, the Abu Road taluk of the Banaskantha district of Bombay State, the Sunel enclave of the Mandsaur district and the Lohara sub-tehsil of the Hissar district of the Punjab was merged with Rajasthan while the Sironj sub-division of the Kota district of Rajasthan was transferred to Madhya Pradesh.

== Elected members ==
Constituency	Reserved for (ST/None)	Member	Party
Sawai Madhopur	None	Shri Das	Indian National Congress
Malarna Chaur	None	Tikaram Paliwal	Indian National Congress
Karauli	None	Rajkumar Brijendra Pal	Independent
Sapotra	None	Dharam Chand	Akhil Bharatiya Ram Rajya Parishad
Hindaun	None	Chhanga	Indian National Congress
Hindaun	None	Riddhi Chand	Indian National Congress
Mahwa	None	Tikaram Paliwal	Indian National Congress
Nadoti	None	Shyam Lal	Indian National Congress
Behror	None	Ramjilal Yadav	Indian National Congress
Bansur	None	Badri Prashad	Indian National Congress
Mandawar	None	Ghasi Ram Yadav	Indian National Congress
Tijara	None	Ghasi Ram	Indian National Congress
Ramgarh	None	Durlabh Singh	Indian National Congress
Alwar	None	Chhotu Singh	Indian National Congress
Thana Gazi	None	Bhawani Sahaya	Indian National Congress
Lachmangarh Rajgarh	None	Bhola Nath	Indian National Congress
Lachmangarh Rajgarh	None	Sampat Ram	Indian National Congress
Kaman	None	Md. Ibrahim	Indian National Congress
Nagaur	None	Gopi Lal Yadav	Kisan Mazdoor Lok Paksha
Kumher	None	Raja Man Singh	Kisan Mazdoor Lok Paksha
Weir	None	Ghasi Singh	Indian National Congress
Weir	None	Tej Pal	Indian National Congress
Bharatpur	None	Hari Dutt	Kisan Mazdoor Lok Paksha
Roopbas	None	Shri Bhan Singh	Kisan Mazdoor Lok Paksha
Bari	None	Mangal Singh	Indian National Congress
Bari	None	Hans Raj	Indian National Congress
Dholpur	None	Sri Gopal Bhargava	Indian National Congress
Nawalgarh	None	Th. Bhim Singh	Akhil Bharatiya Ram Rajya Parishad
Jhunjhunu	None	Narottam Lal	Indian National Congress
Khetri	None	Th. Raghubirsingh	Akhil Bharatiya Ram Rajya Parishad
Khetri	None	Mahadeo	Indian National Congress
Chirawa	None	Harlal Singh	Indian National Congress
Udaipur	None	Devi Singh	Akhil Bharatiya Ram Rajya Parishad
Lachmangarh	None	Balbir	Kisan Mazdoor Lok Paksha
Lachmangarh	None	Narain Lal	Indian National Congress
Sikar Town	None	Radha Krishna	Indian National Congress
Sikar Tehsil	None	Ishwar Singh	Kisan Mazdoor Lok Paksha
Danta Ramgarh	None	Bhairon Singh	Bharatiya Jana Sangh
Neem Ka Thana A	None	Ladu Ram	Indian National Congress
Neem Ka Thana B	None	Rup Narain	Akhil Bharatiya Ram Rajya Parishad
Neem Ka Thana C	None	Kapil Deo	Indian National Congress
Tonk	None	Lalu Ram	Indian National Congress
Tonk	None	Ram Ratan	Indian National Congress
Thikana Uniara	None	Rao Raja Sardar Singh	Akhil Bharatiya Ram Rajya Parishad
Malpura	None	Damodar Lal	Indian National Congress
Jaipur City A	None	Sah Alumuddin	Indian National Congress
Jaipur City B	None	Ram Kishore	Indian National Congress
Jaipur City C	None	Gulab Chand Kasliwal	Indian National Congress
Jaipur Chaksu	None	Hari Shankar Sidhant Shastri	Indian National Congress
Jaipur Chaksu	None	Narain Chaturvedi	Indian National Congress
Bandikui	None	Vishambar Nath	Indian National Congress
Rupnagar	None	Bhanu Pratap Singh	Akhil Bharatiya Ram Rajya Parishad
Phagi	None	Abani Kumar	Akhil Bharatiya Ram Rajya Parishad
Kishangarh	None	Chand Mal	Indian National Congress
Lalsot Dausa	None	Ram Lal Bansiwal	Indian National Congress
Lalsot Dausa	None	Ram Karan Joshi	Indian National Congress
Sikrai	None	Triveni Shyam	Indian National Congress
Kotputli	None	Hazari Lal	Indian National Congress
Bairath	None	Mukti Lal Modi	Indian National Congress
Amber A	None	Kr. Tej Singh	Akhil Bharatiya Ram Rajya Parishad
Amber B	None	Maha Rawal Sangram Singh	Independent
Jamwa Ramgarh	None	Man Singh	Akhil Bharatiya Ram Rajya Parishad
Jaisalmer	None	Hadvant Singh	Independent
Bhavri	None	Mohbat Singh	Independent
Sheoganj	None	Arjun Singh	Independent
Sirohi	None	Jawan Singh	Independent
Bali	None	Laxman Singh	Independent
Bali Desuri	None	Bhairun Singh	Independent
Sojat Desuri	None	Bhairun Singh	Independent
Pali Sojat	None	Bishan Singh	Independent
Sojat Main	None	Keshri Singh	Independent
Jaitran East Sojat East	None	Mohan Singh	Independent
Jaitran North West	None	Umed Singh	Independent
Jalore A	None	Madho Singh	Akhil Bharatiya Ram Rajya Parishad
Jalore B	None	Hazari Singh	Independent
Jaswantpura	None	Chatar Singh	Independent
Jaswantpura Sanchore	None	Ganpat Singh	Independent
Sanchore	None	Kishore Singh	Independent
Barmer A	None	Ten Singh	Akhil Bharatiya Ram Rajya Parishad
Barmer B	None	Nathu Singh	Independent
Barmer C	None	Madho Singh	Independent
Siwana	None	Mota Ram	Akhil Bharatiya Ram Rajya Parishad
Jodhpur City A	None	Inder Nath	Independent
Jodhpur City B	None	Hanwant Singh	Independent
Jodhpur Tehsil South	None	Narsing Kachawa	Independent
Jodhpur Tehsil North	None	Mangal Singh	Independent
Phalodi	None	Himmat Singh	Independent
Shergarh	None	Khet Singh	Independent
Bilara	None	Santosh Singh	Independent
Nagaur East	None	Ganga Singh	Akhil Bharatiya Ram Rajya Parishad
Nagaur West	None	Keshri Singh	Akhil Bharatiya Ram Rajya Parishad
Merta West	None	Nathu Ram	Indian National Congress
Merta East	None	Bhopal Singh	Akhil Bharatiya Ram Rajya Parishad
Nawan	None	Kishan Lal	Indian National Congress
Parbatsar	None	Madan Mohan	Akhil Bharatiya Ram Rajya Parishad
Deedwana	None	Mathura Das	Indian National Congress
Deedwana Parbatsar	None	Moti Lal	Indian National Congress
Bagidora	None	Hari Ram	Indian National Congress
Banswara	ST	Belji	Socialist Party
Ghatol	None	Dulji	Indian National Congress
Sagwara	None	Bhogilal Pandaya	Indian National Congress
Dungarpur	None	Soma	Indian National Congress
Dungarpur	None	Hari Deo	Indian National Congress
Pratapgarh Nimbahera	None	Badri Lal	Indian National Congress
Pratapgarh Nimbahera	None	Manna	Indian National Congress
Badi Sadri Kapasin	None	Jai Chand	Indian National Congress
Badi Sadri Kapasin	None	Jagat Singh	Bharatiya Jana Sangh
Chittor	None	Pratap Singh	Bharatiya Jana Sangh
Begun	None	Sugan Chand	Indian National Congress
Mandal Garh	None	Keshri Singh	Bharatiya Jana Sangh
Jahazpur	None	Ram Dayal	Independent
Sahapura Benara	None	Rajadhiraj Amar Singh	Independent
Sahapura Benara	None	Kistoor Chand	Indian National Congress
Asind	None	Gopal Singh	Independent
Mandal	None	Chunni Lal	Indian National Congress
Shahada	None	Sambhoo Singh	Hindu Mahasabha
Bhilwara	None	Tej Mal	Indian National Congress
Bhim	None	Sangram Singh	Bharatiya Jana Sangh
Kumbalgarh	None	Vijai Singh	Bharatiya Jana Sangh
Khamnor	None	Shiv Dan Singh	Independent
Saira	None	Din Bandhu	Indian National Congress
Saira	None	Roshan Lal	Indian National Congress
Sarada Salumbar	None	Sohan Lal	Indian National Congress
Sarada Salumbar	None	Laxman Bhil	Indian National Congress
Udaipur City	None	Mohan Lal	Indian National Congress
Girwa	None	Lal Singh	Bharatiya Jana Sangh
Unthala	None	R. S. Dalip Singh	Bharatiya Jana Sangh
Lasadia	None	Udai Lal	Indian National Congress
Rajasmand Relmagra	None	Amrit Lal Yadav	Indian National Congress
Rajasmand Relmagra	None	Bhairun Singh	Kisan Mazdoor Lok Paksha
Sironj	None	Payare Lal	Hindu Mahasabha
Chhabra	None	Ved Pal Tayagi	Indian National Congress
Atru	None	Raja Himmat Singh	Akhil Bharatiya Ram Rajya Parishad
Kishanganj	None	Raghuraj Singh	Akhil Bharatiya Ram Rajya Parishad
Sangod	None	Lal Bahadur	Indian National Congress
Ladpura	None	Kanwar Lal	Indian National Congress
Ladpura	None	Daleep Singh	Indian National Congress
Pipalda	None	Tej Raj Singh	Akhil Bharatiya Ram Rajya Parishad
Anta Mangrol	None	Chandra Kant	Akhil Bharatiya Ram Rajya Parishad
Bundi	None	Chhittar Lal	Kisan Mazdoor Praja Party
Hindol	None	Sajjan Singh	Akhil Bharatiya Ram Rajya Parishad
Patan	None	Keshri Singh	Akhil Bharatiya Ram Rajya Parishad
Jhalrapatan	None	Madho Lal	Indian National Congress
Jhalrapatan	None	Bhagwan Singh	Indian National Congress
Khanpur	None	Bhairavlal Kala Badal	Indian National Congress
Manohar Thana	None	Jayendra Singh	Akhil Bharatiya Ram Rajya Parishad
Bijkarner City	None	Moti Chnad	Independent
Nokha	None	Kan Singh	Independent
Bikaner Tehsil	None	Jaswant Singh	Independent
Churu	None	Kumbha Ram	Indian National Congress
Churu	None	Prabhu Dayal	Indian National Congress
Sardar Shahar	None	Chandan Mal	Indian National Congress
Ratangarh	None	Mahadev Prashad N. Pandit	Independent
Sujangarh	None	Pratap Singh	Independent
Bhadra	None	Hans Raj	Indian National Congress
Nohar	None	Manphool Singh	Indian National Congress
Sadulgarh	None	Ramchandra Ch.	Indian National Congress
Raisingh Nagar Karanpur	None	Dharam Pal	Indian National Congress
Raisingh Nagar Karanpur	None	Gurudayal Singh	Indian National Congress
Ganganagar	None	Moti Ram	Indian National Congress

== State Reorganization ==
On 1 November 1956, under States Reorganisation Act, 1956, the Ajmer State, the Abu Road taluk of the Banaskantha district of Bombay State, the Sunel enclave of the Mandsaur district and the Lohara sub-tehsil of the Hissar district of the Punjab was merged with Rajasthan while the Sironj sub-division of the Kota district of Rajasthan was transferred to Madhya Pradesh. This resulted in the change in assembly constituencies from 140 with 160 seats to 136 with 176 seats in 1957 assembly elections.

== See also ==
- 1951–52 elections in India
- 1957 Rajasthan Legislative Assembly election
