= Gujarat Lokayukta =

Parliamentary ombudsman of Gujarat, India

Gujarat

Agency overview
- Formed: 1986

Jurisdictional structure
- Federal agency: India
- Operations jurisdiction: India
- General nature: Federal law enforcement

Operational structure
- Headquarters: Lokayukt Bhavan, Sector-10B, Opp. Sector-21 Police Station, Gandhinagar.(079)-23255753. arlok@gujarat.gov.in
- Agency executive: Hon’ble Justice R H Shukla.

Gujarat Lokayukta is the Parliamentary Ombudsman for the state of Gujarat (India). It is a high level statutory functionary, created to address grievances of the public against ministers, legislators, administration and public servants in issues related to misuse of power, mal-administration and corruption. It was first formed under the Gujarat Lokayukta and Upa-Lokayukta Act, and approved by the president of India in 1986. With The Lokpal and Lokayuktas Act, 2013 adopted by the Indian Parliament coming into force as a law on 16 January 2014, each state in India was required to appoint its Lokayukta within a year. A bench of Lokayukta should consist of judicial and non-judicial members. An Upa-Lokayukta is a deputy to Lokayukta and assists with her or his work and acts as the in-charge Lokayukta in case the position falls vacant before time.

A Lokayukta of the state is appointed to office by the state Governor after consulting the committee consisting of State Chief Minister, Speaker of Legislative Assembly, Leader of Opposition, Chairman of Legislative Council and Leader of Opposition of Legislative Council and cannot be removed from office except for reasons specified in the Act and will serve the period of five years.

== History and administration ==
Gujarat Lokayukta and Upa-Lokayukta was approved by its Legislative Assembly in 1986. Gujarat Lokayukta bill was passed with amendments in year 2013 but was not accepted by Governor as the bill made provision for a six-member committee headed by Chief Minister to appoint Lokayukta. Gujarat Governor had appointed the Lokayukta in 2013 after consulting the serving Chief Justice of Gujarat High Court but was not accepted by the State Government. Later the Supreme Court of India upheld the appointment but the appointed Lokayukta Mr Justice (retd) R A Mehta did not take the charge.

== Oath or affirmation ==
"I, <name>, having been appointed Lokayukta (or Upa-Lokayukta) do swear in the name of God (or solemnly affirm) that I will bear faith and allegiance to the Constitution of India as by law established and I will duly and faithfully and to the best of my ability, knowledge and judgment perform the duties of my office without fear or favour, affection or ill-will."

— First Schedule, Gujarat Lokayukta and Upa-Lokayuktas Act, 1986

== Powers ==
Lokayukta for the state of Gujarat has got powers to investigate complaints of corruption by the general public against public officials such as the chief minister of state, deputy CM of the state, ministers of state, government company chairman, of a and university vice-chancellor and others mentioned in the Act. Gujarat Lokayukta Act says that Lokayukta has independent powers to investigate and prosecute any government official or public servants of all grades, who are covered by the act and against whom the complaint is received for abusing his authority for self interest or causes hurt to anyone or any action done intentionally or following corrupt practices negatively impacting the state or individual.

== Appointment and tenure ==
Justice (retd.) Rajesh H Shukla, an ex-judge of Gujarat High Court was appointed as the fifth Lokayukta for the State of Gujarat.

In 2013, Justice (Retired) R A Mehta though appointed as Lokayukta of the state refused to take charge due to differences with the State Government.

Index	Name	Holding charge from	Holding charge to
1	DH Shukla	26 July 1988	25 July 1993
2	IC Bhatt	10 November 1993	9 November 1998
3	SM Soni	25 November 1998	24 November 2003
4	D P Buch.	11 December 2013	11 December 2018
5	Justice Rajesh Shukla	23 June 2020	

== See also ==
- Lokayukta
- Lokpal and Lokayukta Act, 2013
- Delhi Lokayukta
- Himachal Pradesh Lokayukta
- Madhya Pradesh Lokayukta
