= Barkatullah Khan =

6th Chief Minister of Rajasthan

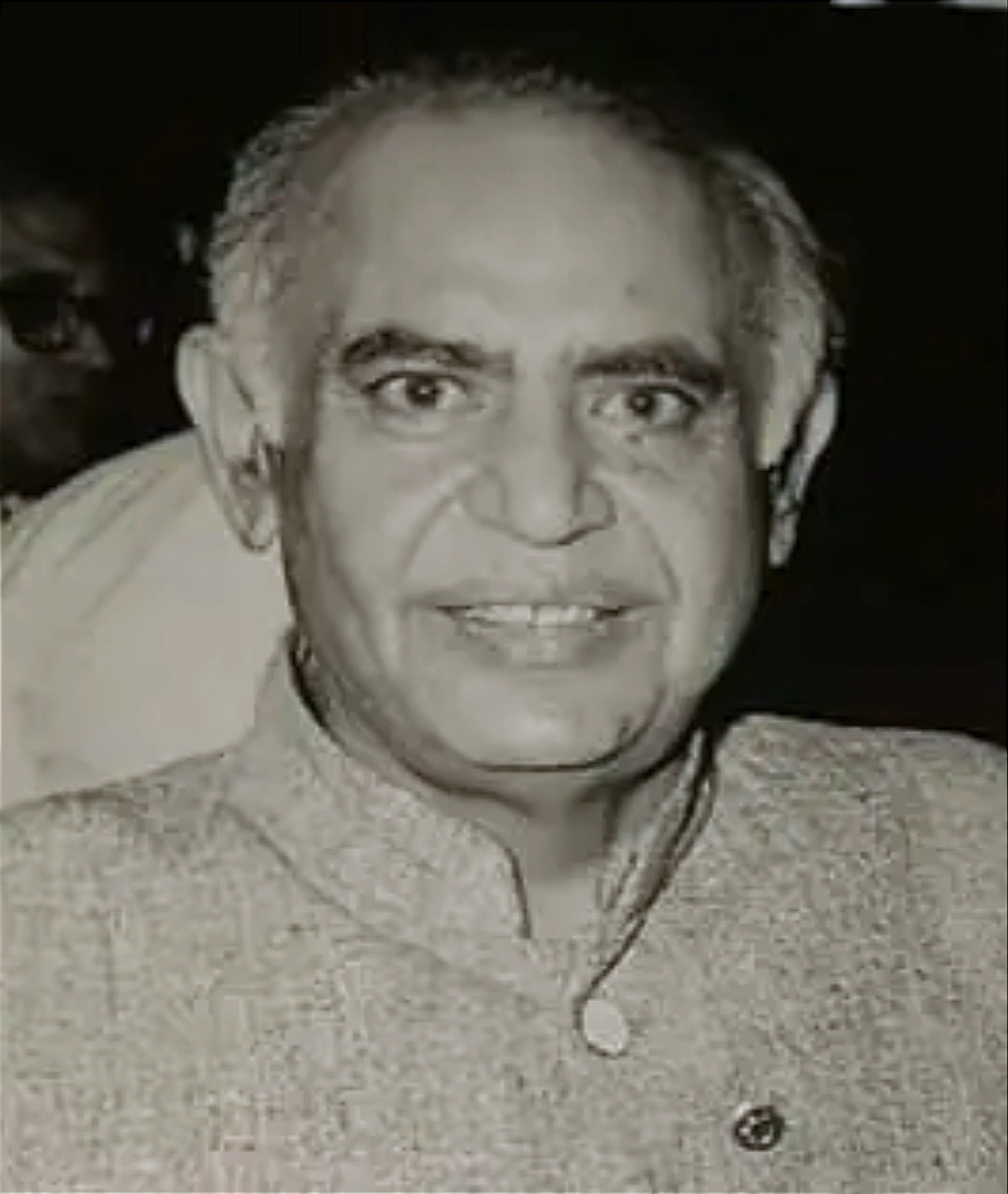

6th Chief Minister of Rajasthan
- In office 9 July 1971 – 11 October 1973
- Preceded by: Mohan Lal Sukhadia
- Succeeded by: Hari Dev Joshi

Personal details
- Born: 25 October 1920 Jodhpur, Jodhpur State, British India
- Died: 11 October 1973 (aged 52) Jaipur, Rajasthan, India
- Party: Indian National Congress
- Spouse: Ushi Khan
- Education: Law (Lucknow University)

Barkatullah Khan (25 October 1920 – 11 October 1973) also known as Pyare Miyan was an Indian Urdu-language poet, Advocate and politician. He served as the 6th Chief Minister of Rajasthan as the first Muslim Chief Minister of Rajasthan from 9 July 1971 to 11 October 1973, till his death as a Chief Minister.

He was a leader of Indian National Congress. He served as a Member of the Rajasthan Legislative Assembly from the Tijara Assembly constituency, and served from 1972 to 1977.

== Early life ==
Khan was born into a small businessman family on 25 October 1920 in Jodhpur.

He went to Lucknow University for his graduation where he met Feroz Gandhi.

== Personal life ==
Khan married Ushi Khan, they do not have any child.

== See also ==
- Politics of Rajasthan
- Government of Rajasthan
- History of Rajasthan
- List of chief ministers of Rajasthan

Preceded by Mohan Lal Sukhadia	Chief Minister of Rajasthan; Jul 1971 – Oct 1973	Succeeded by Hari Dev Joshi
