= Hira Lal Devpura =

11th Chief Minister of Rajasthan

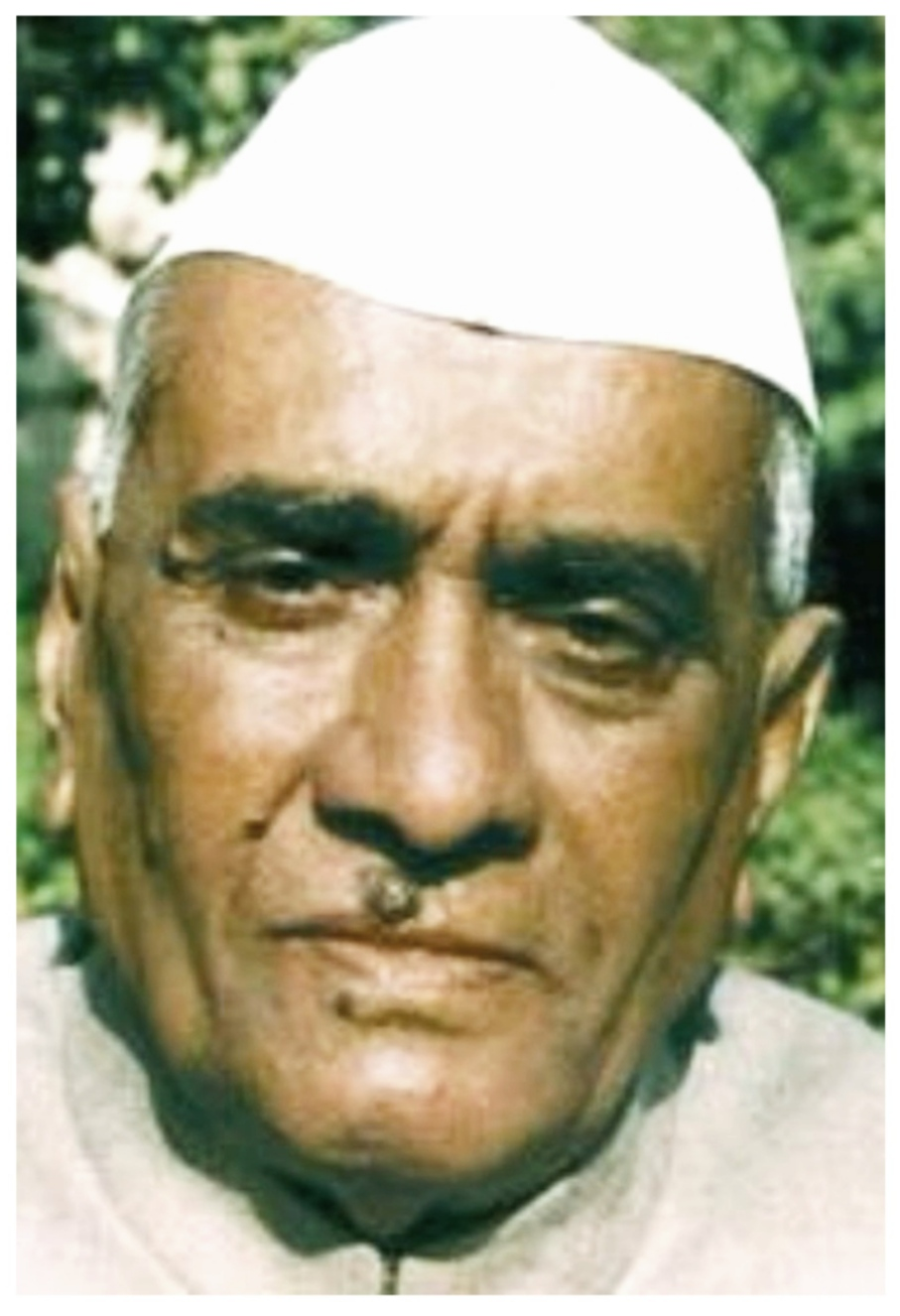

11th Chief Minister of Rajasthan
- In office 23 February 1985 – 10 March 1985
- Preceded by: Shiv Charan Mathur
- Succeeded by: Hari Dev Joshi

Member of the Rajasthan Legislative Assembly
- In office 1967–1977
- Preceded by: Govind Singh
- Succeeded by: Govind Singh Shaktawat
- Constituency: Kumbhalgarh
- In office 1980–1993
- Preceded by: Govind Singh Shaktawat
- Succeeded by: Surendra Singh Rathore
- Constituency: Kumbhalgarh
- In office 1998–2003
- Preceded by: Surendra Singh Rathore
- Succeeded by: Surendra Singh Rathore
- Constituency: Kumbhalgarh

Personal details
- Born: 1925
- Died: 2004 (aged 78-79)
- Party: Indian National Congress

Hira Lal Devpura (1925–2004) was Chief Minister of Rajasthan state in India from 23 February 1985 to 10 March 1985. It was a stop gap arrangement between Shiv Charan Mathur and Hari Dev Joshi. He was a leader of Indian National Congress party. He represented the Kumbhalgarh Assembly constituency of Udaipur Division.

== Positions held ==
Preceded by Shiv Charan Mathur	Chief Minister of Rajasthan; February 1985 – March 1985	Succeeded by Hari Dev Joshi

== See also ==
- Politics of Rajasthan
- Government of Rajasthan
- History of Rajasthan
- List of chief ministers of Rajasthan
