= Manikya Lal Verma =

2nd Prime minister of the United States of Rajasthan

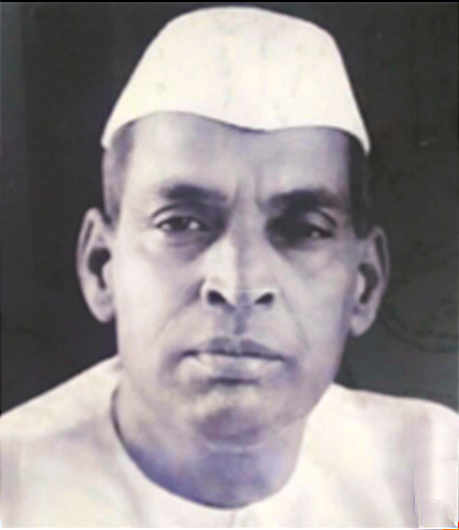

2nd Prime Minister of United States of Rajasthan
- In office 1948–1949
- Preceded by: Gokul Lal Asava
- Succeeded by: Hiralal Shastri

Member of Parliament for Tonk, Chittorgarh
- In office 1952–1957

Personal details
- Born: 4 December 1897 Bijolia, Bhilwara district
- Died: 14 January 1969 (aged 71)
- Party: Indian National Congress
- Spouse: Narayani Devi Verma
- Children: 6

Manikya Lal Verma (Born on 4 December 1897 in a Mathur Kayastha family) was a member of Constituent Assembly of India in 1949. He was the second prime minister of Rajasthan, after Gokul Lal Asava. He was elected to Lok Sabha in 1957 from Chittorgarh and in 1952 from Tonk. He was recipient of Padma Bhushan in 1965.

== See also ==
- Politics of Rajasthan
- Government of Rajasthan
- History of Rajasthan
- List of chief ministers of Rajasthan
