= Hari Dev Joshi =

7th Chief Minister of Rajasthan

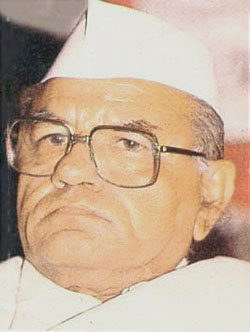

7th Chief Minister of Rajasthan
- In office 4 December 1989 – 4 March 1990
- Preceded by: Shiv Charan Mathur
- Succeeded by: Bhairon Singh Shekhawat
- In office 10 March 1985 – 20 January 1988
- Preceded by: Hira Lal Devpura
- Succeeded by: Shiv Charan Mathur
- In office 11 October 1973 – 29 April 1977
- Preceded by: Barkatullah Khan
- Succeeded by: President's rule

15th Governor of Assam
- In office 10 May 1989 – 21 July 1989
- Chief Minister: Prafulla Kumar Mahanta
- Preceded by: Bhishma Narain Singh
- Succeeded by: Anisetti Raghuvir

6th Governor of Meghalaya
- In office 11 May 1989 – 26 July 1989
- Chief Minister: P. A. Sangma
- Preceded by: Bhishma Narain Singh
- Succeeded by: A. A. Rahim

Personal details
- Born: 17 December 1920; Khandu, Banswara State, British India
- Died: 28 March 1995 (aged 74)
- Political party: Indian National Congress

Hari Dev Joshi (17 December 1920 – 21 March 1995) was an Indian independence activist and Indian National Congress politician. He was chief minister of Rajasthan three times.

== Political career ==
In 1952, he was elected from Dungarpur. He then shifted to Ghatol in 1957 before being elected from Banswara eight times until his death. He stood undefeated consecutively in all the elections. He was chief minister of Rajasthan three times, first from 11 October 1973 to 29 April 1977, second time from 10 March 1985 to 20 January 1988 and finally for a short time from 4 December 1989 to 4 March 1990.

He also has served as a Governor of Assam, Meghalaya and West Bengal.

== Commemoration ==
Institutes named after him include Haridev Joshi University of Journalism and Mass Communication in Jaipur and the Haridev Joshi Government Girl's College, Banswara.

== See also ==
- Politics of Rajasthan
- Government of Rajasthan
- History of Rajasthan
- List of chief ministers of Rajasthan

Preceded by Barkatullah Khan	Chief Minister of Rajasthan; 1973—1977	Succeeded by Bhairon Singh Shekhawat
Preceded by Hira Lal Devpura	Chief Minister of Rajasthan; 1985—1988	Succeeded by Shiv Charan Mathur
Preceded by Shiv Charan Mathur	Chief Minister of Rajasthan; 1989—1990	Succeeded by Bhairon Singh Shekhawat
Preceded by Bhishma Narain Singh	Governor of Assam; 1989	Succeeded by Anisetti Roghuvir
