= Kumbhalgarh Assembly constituency =

Legislative Assembly constituency in Rajasthan State, India

Coordinates: 25.15°N 73.58°E

Kumbhalgarh
- Constituency No. 174 for the Rajasthan Legislative Assembly

Constituency details
- Country: India
- Region: North India
- State: Rajasthan
- District: Rajsamand
- Lok Sabha constituency: Rajsamand
- Established: 1972
- Total electors: 226,463
- Reservation: None

Member of Legislative Assembly
- 16th Rajasthan Legislative Assembly
- Incumbent Surendra Singh
- Party: Bharatiya Janata Party
- Elected year: 2023

Kumbhalgarh Assembly constituency is one of the 200 Legislative Assembly constituencies of Rajasthan state in India.

It comprises Kumbhalgarh and Amet tehsils, both in Rajsamand district. As of 2023, its representative is Surendra Singh of the Bharatiya Janata Party.

== Members of the Legislative Assembly ==
Election	Name	Party
2008	Ganesh Singh Parmar	Indian National Congress
2013	Surendra Singh	Bharatiya Janata Party
2018	Surendra Singh	Bharatiya Janata Party

== Election results ==
=== 2023 ===
2023 Rajasthan Legislative Assembly election: Kumbhalgarh
Party	Candidate	Votes	%	±%
BJP	Surendra Singh Rathore	78,133	50.11	−0.61
INC	Yogendra Singh Parmar	56,073	35.96	−1.55
BAP	Ram Meena	8,813	5.65	
Independent	Neeraj Singh Ranawat	4,237	2.72	
BTP	Chaman Dana	1,843	1.18	
BSP	Narayan Lal Balai	1,623	1.04	−0.7
NOTA	None of the above	1,915	1.23	−1.14
Majority		22,060	14.15	+0.94
Turnout		155,916	68.85	+0.69
BJP hold		Swing		

=== 2018 ===
2018 Rajasthan Legislative Assembly election: Kumbhalgarh
Party	Candidate	Votes	%	±%
BJP	Surendra Singh	70,803	50.72	
INC	Ganesh Singh	52,360	37.51	
Independent	Narsingh Bhil	5,652	4.05	
BSP	Narayan Lal Balai	2,436	1.74	
AAP	Bhanwar Lal Gurjar	1,688	1.21	
NOTA	None of the above	3,307	2.37	
Majority		18,443	13.21	
Turnout		139,600	68.16	
BJP hold		Swing		

== See also ==
- List of constituencies of the Rajasthan Legislative Assembly
- Rajsamand district
