= Shiv Charan Mathur =

10th Chief Minister of Rajasthan

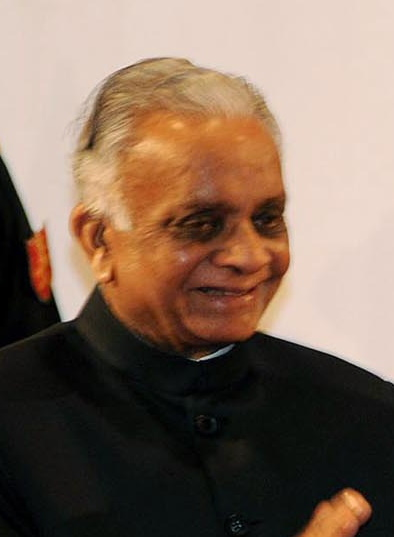
- Mathur in October 2008

14th Chief Minister of Rajasthan
- In office 14 July 1981 – 23 February 1985
- Preceded by: Jagannath Pahadia
- Succeeded by: Hira Lal Devpura
- In office 20 January 1988 – 4 December 1989
- Preceded by: Hari Dev Joshi
- Succeeded by: Hari Dev Joshi

Governor of Assam
- In office 4 July 2008 – 25 June 2009
- Preceded by: Ajai Singh
- Succeeded by: K Sankaranarayanan

Personal details
- Born: 14 February 1927
- Died: 25 June 2009 (aged 82) New Delhi, India
- Party: Indian National Congress

Shiv Charan Mathur (14 February 1927 – 25 June 2009) was an Indian politician and a senior leader of the Indian National Congress from Rajasthan. He served twice as the Chief Minister of Rajasthan, first from 1981 to 1985 and again from 1988 to 1989. He also served as Governor of Assam from 2008 to 2009.

== Political career ==
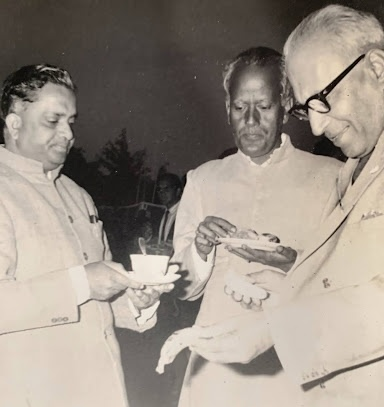
Shiv Charan Mathur, Kedar Nath Srivastava, Mohan Singh Mehta

Mathur began his political career with the Indian National Congress. He held several key ministerial posts before becoming the Chief Minister of Rajasthan, first from 1981 to 1985 and again from 1988 to 1989. His resigned from Chief Minister post following the Bharatpur encounter case of Raja Man Singh. Mathur also served as a Member of Parliament (Lok Sabha) from 1964 to 1967, and again from 1996 to 1998 and as the Governor of Assam from 2008 until his death in 2009.

== Resignation ==
Mathur resigned as Chief Minister of Rajasthan on 23 February 1985 following the Bharatpur encounter case, in which Raja Man Singh of Bharatpur was killed in a fake police encounter during the assembly elections. The incident sparked widespread public and political outrage over alleged misuse of power, prompting Mathur to take moral responsibility and step down. He was succeeded by Hira Lal Devpura as interim Chief Minister.

Preceded by Jagannath Pahadia	Chief Minister of Rajasthan; 1981–1985	Succeeded by Hira Lal Devpura
Preceded by Hari Dev Joshi	Chief Minister of Rajasthan; 1988–1989	Succeeded by Hari Dev Joshi
Government offices
Preceded by Ajai Singh	Governor of Assam; 2008–2009	Succeeded by K Sankaranarayanan
