= C. S. Venkatachar =

2nd Chief Minister of Rajasthan

C. S. Venkatachar CIE OBE
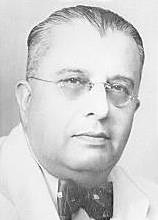

2nd Chief Minister of Rajasthan
- In office 6 January 1951 – 25 April 1951
- Governor: Man Singh II (was in the post of Rajpramukh .)
- Preceded by: Hiralal Shastri
- Succeeded by: Jai Narayan Vyas

Personal details
- Born: 11 July 1899 Kolar District, Kingdom of Mysore, Indian Empire
- Died: 16 June 1999 (aged 99)
- Party: Indian National Congress

Cadambi Sheshachar Venkatachar (11 July 1899 – 16 June 1999) was an Indian Civil Servant, diplomat and the second Chief Minister of Rajasthan.

== Early life and education ==
Venkatachar was born in a village about 25 km from Bangalore, in a Brahmin family. Both his father and uncle had been educated in English, and were employed by the British Raj. Venkatachar was educated at Maharaja's Central College, Bangalore and thence at Madras University, where he graduated in Chemistry in 1920. In 1921, he travelled to London and sat for the Indian Civil Service exam and was one of the 16 successful entrants (13 Indian and 3 European) out of the Approximately 150 who sat for the exam. He completed his probationary year of service at Cambridge University and joined the Indian Civil Service in 1922.

== Career ==
Initially, Venkatachar served in United Provinces of British India and was associated closely with the Census of India, 1931. He was then appointed to the Indian Political Service - a rare honour, as this service was de facto reserved for British Military Officers. From 1939 to 1941, he was the Agent of the Government of India in British Malaya. Venkatachar was appointed an Officer of the Order of the British Empire (OBE) in the 1941 Birthday Honours. In 1942, he was the commissioner of Allahabad, and was appointed a Companion of the Indian Empire (CIE) in the 1946 Birthday Honours.

== Post-Independence ==
In 1947, he was elected to the Constituent Assembly of India. In October 1948, Venkatachar became the Diwan of Jodhpur State and the Prime Minister of Bikaner State, succeeding the eminent scholar and diplomat, Sardar Kavalam Madhava Panikkar. From 10 April 1949 to 5 January 1951, he was the Regional Commissioner and Advisor (Home and Finance) to the Rajpramukh of Rajasthan state, Maharaja Man Singh II. After the resignation of Heera Lal Shastri, he held the office of the Chief Minister of Rajasthan from 6 January 1951 to 25 April 1951. On 26 April 1951, a new ministry headed by Jai Narayan Vyas assumed the office.

In 1951, Venkatachar became the secretary to the Ministry of States of the Government of India. In 1955, he was appointed the secretary to the President of India, Rajendra Prasad. He served in this position till January 1958. In August 1958, Venkatachar was appointed the High Commissioner of India to Canada. He relinquished charge of the High Commissioner in October 1960, handing over to Birendra Narayan Chakraborty.

He died on 16 June 1999, aged 99.

== Major works ==
A collection of his writings edited by S. Sapru and K. M. Acharya was published under the title, Witness to the Century: Writings of C.S. Venkatachar, ICS.

== See also ==
- Politics of Rajasthan
- Government of Rajasthan
- History of Rajasthan
- List of chief ministers of Rajasthan

Political offices
Preceded by Heera Lal Shastri	Chief Minister of Rajasthan; 1951–1951	Succeeded by Jai Narayan Vyas
Diplomatic posts
Preceded by Dr. M. A. Rauf	High Commissioner of India to Canada; 1958–1960	Succeeded by Birendra Narayan Chakraborty
