= Hiralal Shastri =

1st Chief Minister of Rajasthan

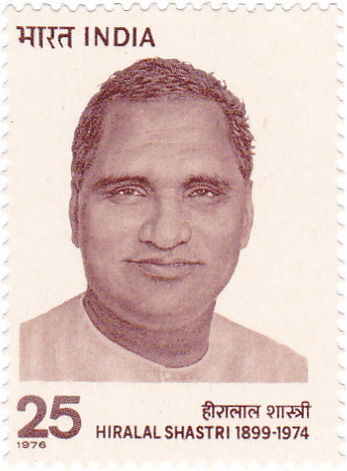

1st Chief Minister of Rajasthan
- Preceded by: Office Established
- Succeeded by: C S Venkatachari
- In office 26 January 1950 – 6 January 1951

3rd Prime Minister of the United States of Rajasthan
- In office 7 April 1949 – 26 January 1950
- Preceded by: Manikya Lal Verma
- Succeeded by: Position abolished

Personal details
- Born: 24 November 1899 Jobner, Jaipur State, British India
- Died: 28 December 1974 (aged 75)
- Party: Indian National Congress Mahamantri in 1936 of jaipur prajamandal
- Spouse: Ratan Shastri

Pandit Hiralal Shastri (24 November 1899 – 28 December 1974) was an Indian politician. He served as the first chief minister of Rajasthan state in northern India. He was also third prime minister of the United Rajasthan after Manikya Lal Verma. He was a member of the Indian National Congress.

== Early life ==
Hiralal Shastri was born at Jobner in Jaipur District in a peasant family. He completed his early education in Jobner. Hiralal passed the degree of Sahitya Shastri in 1920. In 1921, he stood first in the B.A. examination from Maharaja's College, Jaipur.

He joined Jaipur State Service in 1921 and later became Secretary in the Home and Foreign Departments. He resigned from the service in 1927.

== Foundation of Banasthali Vidyapith ==
In 1929, Hiralal Shastri selected a remote and backward village Banasthali, 72 km from Jaipur and founded 'Jeevan Kutir' there. Here he trained a group of social workers and endeavoured to implement a programme of rural reconstruction. On 6 October 1935 Hiralal Shastri and Ratan Shastri with active help and support of fellow freedom fighters like Mr. Durgadutt Harit founded Banasthali Vidyapith in memory of Hiralal's daughter from his first marriage, Shantabai, who died at a very early age.

From early childhood Hiralal Shastri had a burning desire to go to some village and devote his life to the service of the downtrodden. Though he joined Jaipur State Service in 1921 and had a meteoric rise to become Secretary in the Home and Foreign Departments, he resigned the same in 1927. While in administrative service he displayed qualities of hard work, efficiency and fearlessness.

In 1929, in fulfillment of his childhood resolve, Hiralal Shastri selected a remote and backward village Banasthali, 45 miles from Jaipur and founded 'Jeevan Kutir' there. Here he trained a band of dedicated social workers and endeavoured to implement a programme of rural reconstruction. These workers later became the heralds of political awakening in many of the Rajputana States.

== Political career ==
In 1937 he joined Jaipur Rajya Praja Mandal and he was twice elected General Secretary and twice President of it. In 1939 he led the Praja Mandal's Satyagraha for achievement of civil liberties and suffered a six-months imprisonment.

In 1947 he was appointed General Secretary of the All India States Peoples Conference. In the same year he was elected to the Constituent Assembly.

On the installation of representative Government in Jaipur State on 27 March 1948 Hiralal Shastri became the Prime Minister of the state and when Rajasthan State was formed on 30 March 1949 he became its first Chief Minister. He took initiatives to integrate the erstwhile princely states into an effective modern administration. He resigned on 5 January 1951 and later became a member of the Second Lok Sabha. He died on 28 December 1974.

== Honors ==
The Indian Posts and Telegraphs Department issued a commemorative postage stamp in November 1976 in honour of Pandit Hiralal Shastri.

Preceded by Manikya Lal Verma	Chief Minister of Rajasthan; 1949—1951	Succeeded by C S Venkatachari
