= Chief Minister of Rajasthan =

Leader of the executive branch of Government of Rajasthan

- राजस्थान के मुख्यमंत्री
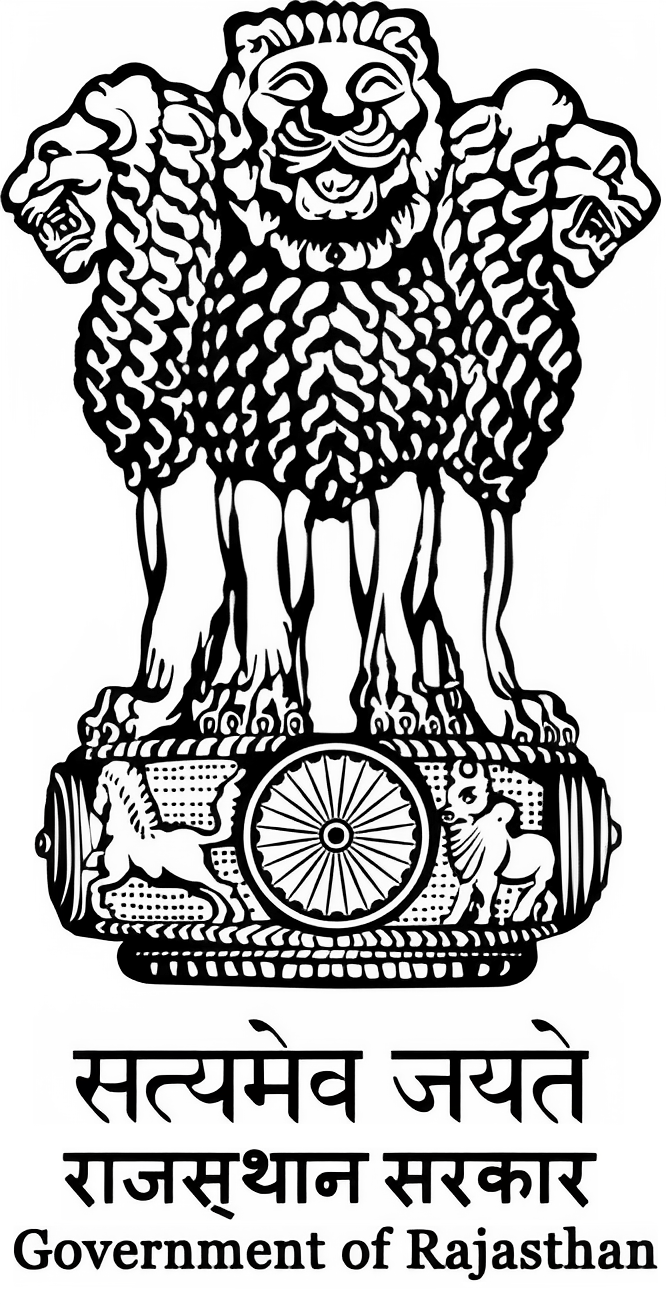
- Emblem of Rajasthan

- Flag of India

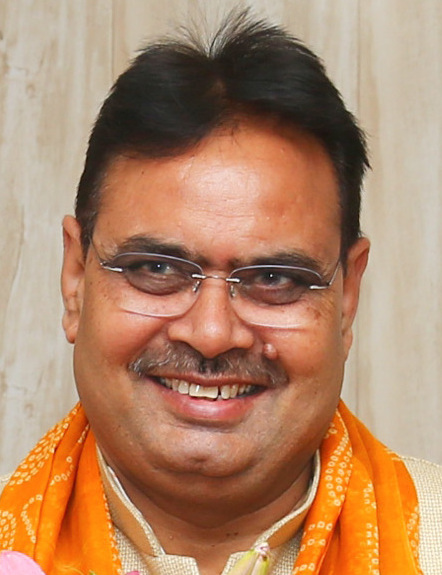
- Incumbent; Bhajan Lal Sharma since 15 December 2023
- Chief Minister's Office; Government of Rajasthan
- Style: The Honourable (formal); Mr. Chief Minister (informal)
- Type: Leader of the Executive
- Status: Head of government
- Abbreviation: CMoRajasthan
- Member of: Legislative Assembly; State Cabinet
- Reports to: Governor of Rajasthan; Rajasthan Legislative Assembly
- Residence: Jaipur
- Seat: State Secretariat, Jaipur
- Nominator: MLAs of the majority party or alliance
- Appointer: Governor of Rajasthan; by convention based on appointees ability to command confidence in the Rajasthan Legislative Assembly
- Term length: At the confidence of the assembly; Chief minister's term is for five years and is subject to no term limits.
- Inaugural holder: Heera Lal Shastri
- Formation: 26 January 1950 (76 years ago)
- Deputy: Deputy Chief Minister of Rajasthan
- Salary: ₹175,000 (US$1,800)/monthly; ₹2,100,000 (US$22,000)/annually
- Website: CMO Rajasthan

The chief minister of Rajasthan is the chief executive of the Indian state of Rajasthan. In accordance with the Constitution of India, the governor is a state's de jure head, but de facto executive authority rests with the chief minister. Following elections to the Rajasthan Legislative Assembly, the state's governor usually invites the party (or coalition) with a majority of seats to form the government. The governor appoints the chief minister, whose council of ministers are collectively responsible to the assembly. Given the confidence of the assembly, the chief minister's term is for five years and is subject to no term limits.Chief Minister also serves as Leader of the House in the Legislative Assembly.

At the time of India's independence in 1947, the region known as Rajputana included various princely states (Note: The princely states included Udaipur, Jaipur, Jodhpur, Bikaner, Jaisalmer, Kota, Bundi, Tonk, Jhalawar, Kishangarh, Alwar, Bharatpur, Sirohi, Dholpur, Karauli, Dungarpur, Banswara, Pratapgarh-Deoliya and Shahpura.) and the province of Ajmer-Merwara. Over time, these areas were gradually integrated to form the modern Indian state of Rajasthan. The integration occurred in seven stages, from March 1948 to November 1956. On 18 March 1948, the states of Alwar, Bharatpur, Dholpur, and Karauli merged their territories to form the Matsya Union, with Shobha Ram becoming its prime minister. Shortly after, on 25 March 1948, the Rajasthan Union was formed by the states of Bundi, Kota, Jhalawar, Dungarpur, Banswara, Pratapgarh, Kishangarh, Tonk, Shahpura and the chiefship of Lawa, with Gokul Lal Asava serving as its first prime minister. On 18 April 1948, Udaipur State joined the Union, and Prime Minister Jawaharlal Nehru inaugurated the newly named United State of Rajasthan, with Manikya Lal Verma becoming its prime minister. Later, on 30 March 1949, the states of Jaipur, Jodhpur, Bikaner, and Jaisalmer merged into the union, which was then renamed the United State of Greater Rajasthan. Hiralal Shastri became the prime minister on 7 April 1949. On 15 May 1949, the Matsya Union joined the United State of Greater Rajasthan.

From 26 January 1950, the state officially came to be known as Rajasthan, with Shashtri continuing as its first chief minister. On 3 March 1952, following the first legislative assembly election, Tika Ram Paliwal of the Indian National Congress became the first elected chief minister of the state. Since 1949, three people have served as Prime Minister and fourteen people have served as chief minister of Rajasthan. Mohan Lal Sukhadia of the Congress party is the longest-serving chief minister, having been sworn in four times and serving for over sixteen years. Vasundhara Raje Scindia of the Bharatiya Janata Party is the only female to have held this position. Since 1998, no chief minister or political party has retained power after completing one term, a trend that continued in the recent elections. After a victory with 115 seats in the 2023 assembly elections, Bhajan Lal Sharma of the Bharatiya Janata Party succeeded Ashok Gehlot of the Indian National Congress.

== Oath as the state chief minister ==
The chief minister serves five years in the office. The following is the oath of the chief minister of state:

I, <Name of Chief Minister>, do swear in the name of God/solemnly affirm that I will bear true faith and allegiance to the Constitution of India as by law established, that I will uphold the sovereignty and integrity of India, that I will faithfully and conscientiously discharge my duties as a Minister for the State of () and that I will do right to all manner of people in accordance with the Constitution and the law without fear or favour, affection or ill-will.

Oath of Secrecy

"I, [Name], do swear in the name of God / solemnly affirm that I will not directly or indirectly communicate or reveal to any person or persons any matter which shall be brought under my consideration or shall become known to me as a Minister for the State of [Name of State] except as may be required for the due discharge of my duties as such Minister."Pad ki Shapath (Oath of Office) "Main, [CM ka Naam], Ishwar ki shapath leta hoon / satyanishtha se pratigyan karta hoon ki main vidhi dwara sthapit Bharat ke Samvidhan ke prati sachi shraddha aur nishtha rakhunga. Main Bharat ki prabhuta aur akhandta akshunn rakhunga. Main [State ka Naam] ke Rajya ke Mukhya Mantri ke roop mein apne kartavyon ka shraddhapoorvak aur shuddh antahkaran se nirvahan karunga, tatha main bhay ya pakshpat, anurag ya dwesh ke bina, sabhi prakar ke logon ke prati Samvidhan aur vidhi ke anusar nyay karunga." B. Gopniyata ki Shapath (Oath of Secrecy) "Main, [CM ka Naam], Ishwar ki shapath leta hoon / satyanishtha se pratigyan karta hoon ki jo vishay [State ka Naam] ke Rajya ke Mukhya Mantri ke roop mein mere vichar ke liye laya jayega athva mujhe gyaat hoga, use kisi vyakti ya vyaktityon ko, tab ke sivay jab ki aise Mukhya Mantri ke roop mein apne kartavyon ke uchit nirvahan ke liye aisa karna apekshit ho, main pratyaksh (directly) ya apratyaksh (indirectly) roop mein sansuchit ya prakat nahi karunga."

== Predecessors ==
=== Chief minister of Matsya Union (1948–1949) ===
#	Portrait	Name	Term of office			Election (Term)	Appointed by	Party
1		Shobha Ram Kumawat	18 March 1948	15 May 1949	1 year, 58 days	–	Udai Bhan Singh (Rajpramukh)	Indian National Congress

=== Prime ministers of Rajasthan (1948–1950) ===
#	Portrait	Name	Term of office			Election (Term)	Appointed by	Party
1		Gokul Lal Asawa	25 March 1948	18 April 1948	24 days	–	Bhim Singh II (Rajpramukh)	Indian National Congress
2		Manikya Lal Verma	18 April 1948	7 April 1949	354 days	–	Bhupal Singh (Rajpramukh)	Indian National Congress
3		Hiralal Shastri	7 April 1949	26 January 1950	294 days	–	Man Singh II (Rajpramukh)	Indian National Congress

=== Chief Minister of Ajmer State (1952–1956) ===
Haribhau Upadhyaya was the first and last Chief Minister of Ajmer State from 24 March 1952 until 1956.

No	Portrait	Name	Constituency	Tenure			Assembly Election	Party (Note: This column only names the chief minister's party. The state government he heads may be a complex coalition of several parties and independents; these are not listed here.)
1		Haribhau Upadhyaya	Shreenagar	24 March 1952	31 October 1956	4 years, 221 days	1st (1952)	Indian National Congress

== Chief ministers of Rajasthan (1950–present) ==
Note: ^{†} Died in office

No	Portrait	Name	Constituency	Tenure			Assembly (election)	Party
1		Heera Lal Shastri	–	26 January 1950	6 January 1951	345 days	–	Indian National Congress
2		C. S. Venkatachar	–	6 January 1951	26 April 1951	110 days	–	Indian National Congress
3		Jai Narayan Vyas	–	26 April 1951	3 March 1952	312 days	–	Indian National Congress
4		Tika Ram Paliwal	Mahuwa	3 March 1952	1 November 1952	243 days	1st (1952 election)	Indian National Congress
(3)		Jai Narayan Vyas	Kishangarh	1 November 1952	13 November 1954	2 years, 12 days	1st (1952 election)	Indian National Congress
5		Mohan Lal Sukhadia	Udaipur	13 November 1954	11 April 1957	12 years, 120 days	1st (1952 election)	Indian National Congress
5		Mohan Lal Sukhadia	Udaipur	11 April 1957	11 March 1962	12 years, 120 days	2nd (1957 election)	Indian National Congress
5		Mohan Lal Sukhadia	Udaipur	12 March 1962	13 March 1967	12 years, 120 days	3rd (1962 election)	Indian National Congress
–		Vacant (Note: President's rule may be imposed when the "government in a state is not able to function as per the Constitution", which often happens because no party or coalition has a majority in the assembly. When President's rule is in force in a state, its council of ministers stands dissolved. The office of chief minister thus lies vacant, and the administration is taken over by the governor, who functions on behalf of the central government. At times, the legislative assembly also stands dissolved.) (President's rule)	–	13 March 1967	26 April 1967	44 days	–	
(5)		Mohan Lal Sukhadia	Udaipur	26 April 1967	9 July 1971	4 years, 74 days	4th (1967 election)	Indian National Congress
6		Barkatullah Khan	Tijara	9 July 1971	11 October 1973^{[†]}	2 years, 94 days	4th (1967 election)	Indian National Congress
6		Barkatullah Khan	Tijara	9 July 1971	11 October 1973^{[†]}	2 years, 94 days	5th (1972 election)	Indian National Congress
7		Hari Dev Joshi	Banswara	11 October 1973	29 April 1977	3 years, 200 days	5th (1972 election)	Indian National Congress
–		Vacant (President's rule)	–	29 April 1977	22 June 1977	54 days	–	
8		Bhairon Singh Shekhawat	Chhabra	22 June 1977	16 February 1980	2 years, 239 days	6th (1977 election)	Janata Party
–		Vacant (President's rule)	–	16 February 1980	6 June 1980	111 days	–	
9		Jagannath Pahadia	Weir	6 June 1980	14 July 1981	1 year, 38 days	7th (1980 election)	Indian National Congress
10		Shiv Charan Mathur	Mandalgarh	14 July 1981	23 February 1985	3 years, 224 days	7th (1980 election)	Indian National Congress
11		Hira Lal Devpura	Kumbhalgarh	23 February 1985	10 March 1985	15 days	7th (1980 election)	Indian National Congress
(7)		Hari Dev Joshi	Banswara	10 March 1985	20 January 1988	2 years, 316 days	8th (1985 election)	Indian National Congress
(10)		Shiv Charan Mathur	Mandalgarh	20 January 1988	4 December 1989	1 year, 318 days	8th (1985 election)	Indian National Congress
(7)		Hari Dev Joshi	Banswara	4 December 1989	4 March 1990	90 days	8th (1985 election)	Indian National Congress
(8)		Bhairon Singh Shekhawat	Chhabra	4 March 1990	15 December 1992	2 years, 286 days	9th (1990 election)	Bharatiya Janata Party
–		Vacant (President's rule)	–	15 December 1992	4 December 1993	354 days	–	
(8)		Bhairon Singh Shekhawat	Bali	4 December 1993	1 December 1998	4 years, 362 days	10th (1993 election)	Bharatiya Janata Party
12		Ashok Gehlot	Sardarpura	1 December 1998	8 December 2003	5 years, 7 days	11th (1998 election)	Indian National Congress
13		Vasundhara Raje	Jhalrapatan	8 December 2003	12 December 2008	5 years, 4 days	12th (2003 election)	Bharatiya Janata Party
(12)		Ashok Gehlot	Sardarpura	12 December 2008	13 December 2013	5 years, 1 day	13th (2008 election)	Indian National Congress
(13)		Vasundhara Raje	Jhalrapatan	13 December 2013	17 December 2018	5 years, 4 days	14th (2013 election)	Bharatiya Janata Party
(12)		Ashok Gehlot	Sardarpura	17 December 2018	15 December 2023	4 years, 363 days	15th (2018 election)	Indian National Congress
14		Bhajan Lal Sharma	Sanganer	15 December 2023	Incumbent	2 years, 325 days	16th (2023 election)	Bharatiya Janata Party

== Statistics ==
Fraction of time of holding CMO by party (as of 23 August 2026)
1. Indian National Congress (67.8%)
2. Bharatiya Janata Party (26.8%)
3. Janata Party (3.46%)
4. President's Rule (2.01%)

#	Chief Minister	Party	Length of term	
#	Chief Minister	Party	Longest tenure	Total tenure
1	Mohan Lal Sukhadia	INC	12 years, 120 days	16 years, 194 days
2	Ashok Gehlot	INC	5 years, 7 days	15 years, 6 days
3	Bhairon Singh Shekhawat	BJP/JP	4 years, 362 days	10 years, 157 days
4	Vasundhara Raje	BJP	5 years, 4 days	10 years, 8 days
5	Hari Dev Joshi	INC	3 years, 200 days	6 years, 241 days
6	Shiv Charan Mathur	INC	3 years, 224 days	5 years, 177 days
7	Bhajan Lal Sharma	BJP*	2 years, 325 days	2 years, 325 days
8	Jai Narayan Vyas	INC	2 years, 12 days	2 years, 324 days
9	Barkatullah Khan	INC	2 years, 94 days	2 years, 94 days
10	Jagannath Pahadia	INC	1 year, 38 days	1 year, 38 days
11	Heera Lal Shastri	INC	345 days	345 days
12	Tika Ram Paliwal	INC	243 days	243 days
13	C. S. Venkatachar	INC	110 days	110 days
14	Hira Lal Devpura	INC	15 days	15 days

== See also ==
- List of districts of Rajasthan
- List of governors of Rajasthan
- List of deputy chief ministers of Rajasthan
- List of institutions of higher education in Rajasthan
