= Jai Narayan Vyas =

3rd Chief Minister of Rajasthan

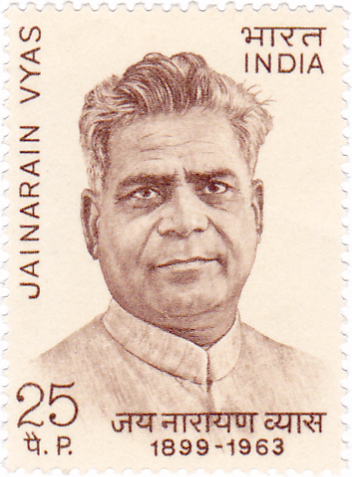
- Vyas on a 1974 stamp of India

3rd and 5th Chief Minister of Rajasthan
- In office 1 November 1952 – 12 November 1954
- Preceded by: Tika Ram Paliwal
- Succeeded by: Mohan Lal Sukhadia
- In office 26 April 1951 – 3 March 1952
- Preceded by: C. S. Venkatachari
- Succeeded by: Tika Ram Paliwal

Personal details
- Born: 18 February 1899; Jodhpur, Jodhpur State, British India
- Died: 14 March 1963 (aged 64); New Delhi, India
- Political party: Indian National Congress
- Spouse: Gaurajadevi Vyas
- Children: 4

Jai Narayan Vyas (18 February 1899 – 14 March 1963) was an Indian politician and the third chief minister of the State of Rajasthan. He hailed from Jodhpur city and was a leader of Indian National Congress party.

== Early life ==
He was born on 18 February 1899 in a Brahmin family to Pandit Sewaramji Vyas and Shrimati Gopi Devi in Jodhpur.

== Political career ==
=== Pre-independence ===
Vyas and other Jodhpuri political activists formed the Marwar Hitkarni Sabha (Marwar Improvement Society) in the early 1920s in Jodhpur State, aimed at freeing the state from the rule of "aliens": a chief minister and other non-Jodhpuri officials both Indian and English. Its motto was "Marwar [Jodhpur] for the Marwaris" and its design to protect local interests from the effects of administrative reform.63 The maharaja gave the Sabha his blessing, while Vyas saw his role in it as his first contribution to the freedom movement. The organization was banned in 1924.

Later he formed the Jodhpur Praja Mandal (1934) with Bhanwarlal Sarraf, the Youth League, and the Marwar Lok Parishad (1938) with inspiration of Subhashchander Bose. He guided his movements from Ajmer, whenever he had trouble in his home state of Jodhpur.

=== Post-independence ===
On 3 March 1948 he became the Prime Minister of Jodhpur State. He relinquished his office on 7 April 1949. He was chief minister of the state of Rajasthan twice, first time from 26 April 1951 to 3 March 1952 and a second time from 1 November 1952 to 12 November 1954.

He lost in first election of Rajasthan legislative assembly in 1952. So Tika Ram Paliwal has been made the chief minister of Rajasthan. Later he won the by-election for Kishangarh and again took over the post on 1 November 1952.

He was also the member of Rajya Sabha from 20 April 1957 to 2 April 1960 and from 3 April 1960 till his death on 14 March 1963 in New Delhi. His remains were cremated in Chandpole, Jodhpur.

== Honors ==
The Jai Narain Vyas University in Jodhpur, his home town, is named after him. Jai Narayan Vyas Colony in Bikaner, is also named after him

Preceded by C S Venkatachari	Chief Minister of Rajasthan; 1951—1952	Succeeded by Tika Ram Paliwal
Preceded by Tika Ram Paliwal	Chief Minister of Rajasthan; 1952—1954	Succeeded by Mohan Lal Sukhadia
