= Tika Ram Paliwal =

4th Chief Minister of Rajasthan

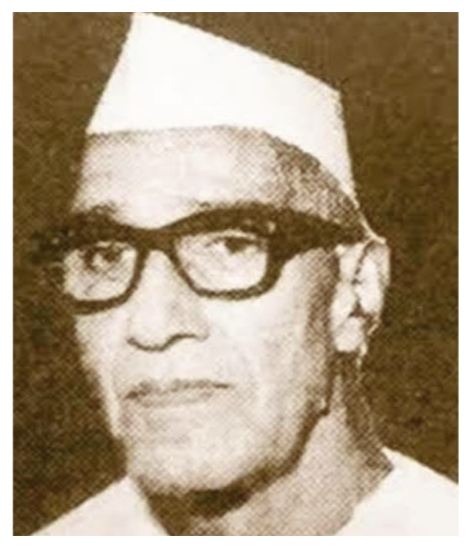
- Tika Ram Paliwal in 1950s

4th Chief Minister of Rajasthan
- In office 3 March 1952 – 31 October 1952
- Preceded by: Jai Narayan Vyas
- Succeeded by: Jai Narayan Vyas

Deputy Chief Minister of Rajasthan
- In office 26 March 1951 – 3 March 1952
- In office 1 November 1952 – 1 November 1954

Member of Rajasthan Legislative Assembly
- In office 1952–1957
- Preceded by: Office Established
- Succeeded by: Gopi Sahai
- Constituency: Mahuwa
- In office 1957–1958
- Preceded by: Gopi Sahai
- Succeeded by: Bhora
- Constituency: Mahuwa

Member of Parliament, Lok Sabha
- In office 1962–1967
- Constituency: Hindaun

Personal details
- Born: 24 April 1909 Mandawar, Jaipur State, British India
- Died: 8 February 1995 (aged 85) Jaipur, Rajasthan, India
- Party: Indian National Congress

Tika Ram Paliwal (24 April 1909 – 8 February 1995) was an Indian politician who served as the Chief Minister of Rajasthan from 3 March 1952 to 31 October 1952.

Paliwal was born in Gaur Brahmin family to Pandit Hukumchand & Sundari Devi at Mandawar, Rajasthan village in the present-day Mandawar tehsil of dausa district. He was a prominent Indian independence activist and was a minister in Jai Narayan Vyas government from 26 April 1951 to 2 March 1952. He became the chief Minister of first democratically elected Rajasthan Legislative Assembly as Jai Narayan Vyas lost in the elections. Later, Jai Narayan Vyas got elected in by-election from Kishangarh and again took over the post on 1 November 1952. So Tika Ram Paliwal resigned from the Cabinet for a short period and re-joined it.

He was MLA from Mahuwa twice in 1952 and 1957. In 1962, he was elected from the Hindaun Lok Sabha constituency as independent candidate.

== See also ==
- Government of Rajasthan
- List of chief ministers of Rajasthan

Preceded by Jai Narayan Vyas	Chief Minister of Rajasthan; March 1952—October 1952	Succeeded by Jai Narayan Vyas
