= Elections in Rajasthan =

Elections in Rajasthan have been held since 1952 to elect members of Rajasthan Legislative Assembly and of Lok Sabha. There are 200 assembly constituencies and 25 Lok Sabha constituencies.

== Main political parties ==
The Indian National Congress (INC) and the Bharatiya Janata Party (BJP) are the two most dominant parties in the state. In the past, various parties such as Janata Party (JP), Janata Dal (JD), Swatantra Party, CPIM, Bharatiya Jana Sangh (BJS) and Ram Rajya Parishad (RRP) have also been influential.

== Lok Sabha elections ==
Till 1980

Year	Lok Sabha	Party-wise Details
1951	1st	Total: 20. INC: 9, RRP: 3, BJS: 1, KLP: 1, Independents: 6
1957	2nd	Total: 22. INC: 19, Independents: 3
1962	3rd	Total: 22. INC: 14, Swatantra Party: 3, BJS: 1, RRP: 1, Independents: 3
1967	4th	Total: 23. INC: 10, Swatantra Party: 8, BJS: 3, Independents: 2
1971	5th	Total: 23. INC: 14, BJS: 4, Swatantra Party: 3, Independents: 2
1977	6th	Total: 25. Janata Party: 24, INC: 1
1980	7th	Total: 25. INC: 18, JP: 4, JP(S) : 2, Congress(U):1

Total Seats- 25

Year	Lok Sabha	1st Party	2nd Party	Others
1984	8th	INC 25		
1989	9th	BJP 13	JD 11	CPI(M) 1
1991	10th	INC 13	BJP 12	
1996	11th	BJP 12	INC 12	AIIC(T) 1
1998	12th	INC 19	BJP 5	AIIC(S) 1
1999	13th	BJP 16	INC 9	
2004	14th	BJP 21	INC 4	
2009	15th	INC 20	BJP 4	Ind 1
2014	16th	BJP 25		
2019	17th	BJP 24	RLP 1	
2024	18th	BJP 14	INC 8	BAP 1,CPI(M) 1, RLP 1

== Legislative Assembly elections ==
The elections for the Rajasthan Legislative Assembly have been held since 1952.

Year	Legislative Assembly	Party-wise Details	Chief Minister	Party
1952	1st	Total: 160. INC: 82, RRP: 24, BJS: 8	Tika Ram Paliwal; Jai Narayan Vyas; Mohan Lal Sukhadia	INC
1957	2nd	Total: 176. INC: 119, RRP: 17, BJS: 6	Mohan Lal Sukhadia	INC
1962	3rd	Total: 176. INC: 88, Swatantra Party: 36, BJS: 15	Mohan Lal Sukhadia	INC
1967	4th	Total: 184. INC: 89, Swatantra Party: 48, BJS: 22	Mohan Lal Sukhadia; Barkatullah Khan	INC
1972	5th	Total: 184. INC: 145, Swatantra Party: 11, BJS: 8	Barkatullah Khan; Hari Dev Joshi	INC
1977	6th	Total: 200. JP: 151, INC: 41	Bhairon Singh Shekhawat	JP
1980	7th	Total: 200. INC: 133, BJP: 32	Jagannath Pahadia; Shiv Charan Mathur; Hira Lal Devpura	INC
1985	8th	Total: 200. INC: 113, BJP: 39, Lok Dal: 27, JP: 10	Hari Dev Joshi; Shiv Charan Mathur	INC
1990	9th	Total: 200. BJP: 85 + JD: 55, INC: 50	Bhairon Singh Shekhawat	BJP
1993	10th	Total: 200. BJP: 95, INC: 76	Bhairon Singh Shekhawat	BJP
1998	11th	Total: 200. INC: 153, BJP: 33	Ashok Gehlot	INC
2003	12th	Total: 200. BJP: 120, INC: 56	Vasundhara Raje	BJP
2008	13th	Total: 200. INC: 96, BJP: 78	Ashok Gehlot	INC
2013	14th	Total: 200. BJP: 163, INC: 21, BSP: 2, Ind: 7	Vasundhara Raje	BJP
2018	15th	Total: 200. INC: 100, BJP: 73, BSP: 6, CPI(M): 2, RLP: 3, BTP: 2, RLD: 1, Ind: 13	Ashok Gehlot	INC
2023	16th	Total: 200. BJP: 115, INC: 69, BAP: 3, BSP: 2, RLD: 1, RLP: 1, Ind: 8	Bhajan Lal Sharma	BJP

== See also ==
- Rajasthan
- Outline of Rajasthan
- Raj Bhavan, Jaipur
- Rajasthan Police
- Bhajan Lal Sharma ministry
- Politics of Rajasthan
- Government of Rajasthan
- Rajasthan High Court
- List of tehsils of Rajasthan
- Rajasthan Legislative Assembly
- List of districts of Rajasthan
- List of governors of Rajasthan
- List of chief ministers of Rajasthan
- List of deputy chief ministers of Rajasthan
- Rajasthan Administrative Service
- Bureau of Investment Promotion
- List of urban local bodies in Rajasthan
- Rajasthan Board of Secondary Education
- Rajasthan Public Service Commission
- Rajasthan State Election Commission
- List of institutions of higher education in Rajasthan
