= Politics of Rajasthan =

Politics of Rajasthan is mainly dominated by two parties, the Bharatiya Janata Party and the Indian National Congress. The current government in Rajasthan is that of the Bhartiya Janata Party and Bhajan Lal Sharma is the Chief Minister.

== Incumbent ==
- Chief Minister - Bhajan Lal Sharma
- Deputy Chief Minister - Diya Kumari and Prem Chand Bairwa
- Leader of the Opposition - Tikka Ram Jully
- Speaker of the House - Vasudev Devnani

== History ==
=== Sukhadia-Shekhawat Era ===
Rajasthan's politics has mainly been dominated by the two state stalwarts, namely, Bhairon Singh Shekhawat and Mohan Lal Sukhadia of the Bharatiya Janata Party and the Indian National Congress respectively. Shri Sukhadia ruled Rajasthan for 17 years and died in February 1982 while Late Shri Shekhawat was in the national political horizon. The earlier politics were dominated by the Congress party. The main opposition party was the Bharatiya Jansangh, headed by Rajasthan's most popular leader Bhairon Singh Shekhawat and the Swatantra party headed by former rulers of Rajasthan. The Congress rule was untouched till the year 1962. But in 1967, Jansangh headed by Shekhawat and Swatantra party headed by Rajmata Gayatri Devi of Jaipur reached the majority point but couldn't form a government. In 1972, the Congress won a landslide victory following the victory in the 1971 war. But after the declaration of emergency, Shekhawat became immensely popular, especially after he was forced to be arrested and was sent to Rohtak Jail in Haryana. As soon as the emergency was lifted, a joint opposition Janta Party won a thundering landslide victory winning 151 of the 200 seats. Shekhawat became the Chief Minister. The government was dismissed by Indira Gandhi in 1980 after she restored power in Delhi. In the 1980 elections, the Janta Party split at the centre giving the Congress a victory in Rajasthan.

Indira Gandhi was assassinated in 1984, and in 1985, a sympathy wave let the Congress sail through in the elections. But in 1989, which could be called a Shekhawat wave, the BJP-JD alliance won all 25 Lok Sabha seats and 140 of 200 seats in the assembly. Shekhawat became the Chief Minister for the second term. Though Janta Dal took back its support to the Shekhawat government, Shekhawat tore apart the JD and continued to rule as the Chief Minister thus earning the title of master manipulator. After the Babri Mosque demolition in Ayodhya, Shekhawat government was suspended by the P.M., P.V.Narasimha Rao and President's rule was enforced in Rajasthan. Election took place in 1993 in which his party won even after the breaking of its alliance with the Janta Dal. But the then Governor Bali Ram Bhagat didn't allow Shekhawat to form the government, but after immense pressure from Shekhawat, who reached the majority point after supports from independents like Sardar Gurjant Singh, Rani Narendra Kanwar, Sujan Singh Yadav, Rohitashva Kumar Sharma, Kr. Arun Singh, Sundar Lal etc. crossed the majority line of 101 seats in the assembly. Shekhawat became the Chief Minister for the third term. This time he ran a successful third term. This was perhaps the diamond phase for Rajasthan as it led to all-round development and Rajasthan also gained identity on the globe as a rapidly developing and beautiful state. Shekhawat introduced Heritage, Desert, Rural, Wildlife tourism to Rajasthan in 1998 elections, the BJP lost heavily due to the onion price rise issue.

=== Change of Leadership ===
After the 1999 elections, both parties saw a major change in leadership. Congress saw the rise of Ashok Gehlot, who lost the Lok Sabha elections in 1999, only 6 months after its victory in the assembly elections, but was successful in running a 5 year government. Whereas, Shekhawat became the Vice-President of India in 2002 so he had to leave Rajasthan politics and the BJP. He appointed Vasundhara Raje as his successor. She led the BJP in 2003 elections and led it to a victory.

=== Raje-Gehlot Era ===
With the successful poll campaign, Raje took over as the Chief Minister of Rajasthan from 2003 - 2008. Narpat Singh Rajvi was the Health Minister, Ghanshyam Tiwari was the Food Minister, Digamber Singh was Industries Minister and Gulab Chand Kataria was the Home Minister. The BJP won the 2004 Lok Sabha elections from here as well. But the tables turned in December 2008, when the infighting within the BJP, Raje's perceived autocratic and despotic rule, and the police excesses in the Gurjar-Meena agitation combined to overcome the incumbent Raje government's development and growth planks, and the Congress emerged victorious with the support of some independent MLA's. Ashok Gehlot was sworn-in as the new Chief Minister of Rajasthan. In 2013 Bharatiya Janata Party won by very large difference. BJP got 163 seats and Congress got only 21 seats out of 200 seats. Vasundhara Raje became the Chief Minister for second time. But in 2018 Indian National Congress flipped the state again with a big majority and Ashok Gehlot became the Chief Minister for the third time. Gehlot for his political acumen received a title of Jadugar (magician) of Rajasthan politics. During these 25 years, he had established deep roots in the Congress cadre and good relations with the Gandhi family, but this victory saw rise of a young leader, Sachin Pilot, who later indirectly claimed the CM seat. The high voltage drama of 2020 unfolded in the state politics when PCC chief and deputy chief minister Pilot, with 18 supporting MLAs, staged a protest against their own government outside the Raj Bhawan. The power struggle spilled out in open when 30 MLAs moved to a hotel in Manesar, Haryana (a state ruled by BJP). This was the time Gehlot proved his magic really works. He managed to save his government with a support from independents and with merger of 6 BSP MLAs into Congress. The event however changed the course of governance. Pilot on multiple occasions criticized his own government, for charges which later built-up support for BJP including the Paper Leak Scams. Gehlot government brought some laws and increased the penalties to curb paper leak cases but the opposition made it a successful poll agenda, which was seen as one of the major failure of Gehlot's third government.

=== Establishment of Power Exchange as a Tradition ===
The exchange of power between the two major parties BJP and Congress was popularly termed as Riwaj (tradition, of changing the party in power). Later on, media coverage and political slogans popularized the terms Raaj Badlega(government will change) and Riwaj Badlega(the tradition, of changing ruling party, will change). The results of elections however established that Riwaj continued for the sixth time in 2023. The BJP turned the tables with a swift victory by winning 115 seats in 2023 elections. But this time Rajasthan politics saw a major turn of events as the BJP leadership changed the CM and appointed a lesser known face Bhajan Lal Sharma. This was seen as an effort to sideline Raje after infightings in the state unit of BJP and is widely seen as rise of new era in Rajasthan politics as BJP has garnered a new generation of leaders and congress yet to decide on its future leadership.

== Firsts in Rajasthan politics ==
- First chief minister of Rajasthan: Heera Lal Shastri, he served as the first chief minister of state from 1950 to 1951 as a member of the Indian National Congress
- First female chief minister of Rajasthan: Vasundhara Raje, she served as the first female chief minister of Rajasthan from 2003 to 2008
- First female minister of Rajasthan: Kamla Beniwal, she became the first female minister of Rajasthan in 1954, at the age of 27
- First non-congress chief minister of Rajasthan: Bhairon Singh Shekhawat, he became chief minister of rajasthan in 1990 as a member of the Bharatiya Janata Party
- First deputy chief minister of Rajasthan: Tika Ram Paliwal, he became first deputy chief minister in 1951
- First female deputy chief minister of Rajasthan: Kamla Beniwal, she became first female deputy chief minister in 2003

== Political parties ==
=== Indian National Congress (INC) ===
The Indian National Congress, commonly referred to as the Congress party, is one of India’s oldest political party in Rajasthan. Founded in 1885, the INC played a pivotal role in India’s independence movement and has historically been a centrist party advocating secularism, social welfare, and inclusive development.

The Congress has governed Rajasthan multiple times since the state’s formation, with notable Chief Ministers including Mohan Lal Sukhadia (1954–1971, with interruptions) and Ashok Gehlot (1998–2003, 2008–2013, 2018–2023). Its campaigns often focus on social welfare schemes, such as the Mahatma Gandhi National Rural Employment Guarantee Act (MGNREGA) and healthcare initiatives like the Chiranjeevi Yojana, introduced during Gehlot’s tenure.

Despite its historical dominance, the Congress has faced challenges in Rajasthan due to internal factionalism, notably between Ashok Gehlot and Sachin Pilot, a former Deputy Chief Minister.

=== Bharatiya Janata Party (BJP) ===
The Bharatiya Janata Party is a major national political party in India and one of the dominant political forces in Rajasthan. Founded in 1980 as a successor to the Bharatiya Jana Sangh, the BJP is ideologically rooted in Hindu nationalism (Hindutva) and economic liberalism, advocating for cultural nationalism, economic reforms, and social conservatism.

The party rose to prominence in the 1990s under leaders like Bhairon Singh Shekhawat, who served as Chief Minister multiple times (1977–1980, 1990–1992, 1993–1998). The BJP’s influence peaked in the 2013 elections, securing 163 out of 200 seats, forming the government under Chief Minister Vasundhra Raje. Since 2023, it is the ruling party in the state.

The BJP’s governance in Rajasthan emphasises schemes like the Jal Jeevan Mission.

=== Rashtriya Loktantrik Party (RLP) ===
The Rashtriya Loktantrik Party is a regional political party in Rajasthan, founded in October 2018 by Hanuman Beniwal. RLP is the third party of Rajasthan besides the Indian National Congress and the Bharatiya Janata Party. The RLP emerged to represent the interests of farmers, rural communities, and the agrarian community, focusing on issues like agricultural reforms, water scarcity, and rural development.

In the 2018 Rajasthan Legislative Assembly election, the RLP made a debut, winning 3 seats and establishing its presence in areas like Nagaur, where Beniwal has influence. In the 2023 elections, the party secured 1 seat but maintained its relevance through alliances and regional support.

=== Bharat Adivasi Party (BAP) ===
The Bharat Adivasi Party is a state recognised political party in Rajasthan. It was founded by Rajkumar Roat in September 2023. The Bharat Adivasi Party won three seats in the 2023 Rajasthan Legislative Assembly election and one seat in the 2023 Madhya Pradesh Legislative Assembly election.

== See also ==
- Rajasthan
- Outline of Rajasthan
- Raj Bhavan, Jaipur
- Rajasthan Police
- Bhajan Lal Sharma ministry
- Government of Rajasthan
- Elections in Rajasthan
- Rajasthan High Court
- List of tehsils of Rajasthan
- Rajasthan Legislative Assembly
- List of districts of Rajasthan
- List of governors of Rajasthan
- List of chief ministers of Rajasthan
- List of deputy chief ministers of Rajasthan
- Rajasthan Administrative Service
- Bureau of Investment Promotion
- List of urban local bodies in Rajasthan
- Rajasthan Board of Secondary Education
- Rajasthan Public Service Commission
- Rajasthan State Election Commission
- List of institutions of higher education in Rajasthan
