= Rajasthan Educational Service =

Governmental Service

Rajasthan Educational Service Rājasthāna Śikṣā Sevā
Service Overview
- Also known as: R.E.S.
- Founded: 1970
- State: Rajasthan
- Training: RSCERT, Udaipur, Rajasthan
- Cadre Controlling Authority: Education Department, Government of Rajasthan
- Minister Responsible: Madan Dilawar, Minister of Education
- Legal personality: Governmental; state service
- Cadre Strength: ~90,049
- Selection: School Lecturer Competitive Exam conducted by RPSC
- Association: Rajasthan Shikshak Sangh

Rajasthan Educational Service (RES) is a State Service of the Rajasthan (India) for school education system. RES officers are Gazetted Officers under the Education Department, Government of Rajasthan.

The functioning of the service is regulated by the Rajasthan Educational (State and Subordinate) Service Rules, 2021. Education Department serves as the administrative parent organization, but the daily operations and cadre management are executed by the Directorate of Secondary Education, Bikaner.

The execution of duties is managed by the Directorate of Secondary Education, Bikaner the directorate is commonly referred to as the Secondary Education Department (or collectively with Elementary Education as the School Education Department). However, all these comes under the Education Department Secretariat, Jaipur.

== Rajasthan School Education Intuitions ==
Entity / Institution	Common Name	Actual Status
Directorate of Elementary Education (Bikaner)	Elementary Education Department	This is a Directorate responsible for Classes 1 to 8.
Directorate of Secondary Education (Bikaner)	Secondary Education Department	This is also a Directorate responsible for Classes 9 to 12.
Rajasthan Council of School Education (RCSCE), Jaipur	Samagra Shiksha (Samsa)	Project Nodal Agency: Manages the Samagra Shiksha budget, infrastructure projects, and monitors the CDEO hierarchy.
Elementary & Secondary Education (Combined)	School Education Department	This is a collective term used in general conversation. Technically, these two are separate directorates working under the same the Education Department.
Education Department (Secretariat, Jaipur)	Parent Department	This is the actual Department. The administrative power, policy-making, and the Principal Secretary are located here. All Directorates report to this body.

== Recruitment ==
Entry into the Rajasthan Educational Service typically begins from the post of Lecturer (also known as Post Graduate Teacher). The recruitment exam is conducted by the Rajasthan Public Service Commission.

- Designation: Lecturer.
- Role: Teaching Senior Secondary classes (Class 11 and 12).
- Appointment Authority: Directorate Secondary Education Rajasthan, Bikaner.

== Types of Posts ==
(Various Roles in Group A & B)
S.No	Rank	Posts / Designations	Nature of Duties
1.	AD	Additional Director	Highest promotion post in the Rajasthan Educational Service (generally filled by RAS officers)
2.	JD	Joint Director	Head of the Education Division / Range
3.	DD	1. Deputy Director; 2. Chief District Education Officer (CDEO)	CDEO is the Head of the District Education Administration
4.	DEO	1. District Education Officer-HQ (Elementary); 2. District Education Officer-HQ (Secondary) 3. Chief Block Education Officer 4. DIET Principal	Administrative Post
5.	Principal	1. Principal; 2. PEEO 3. ACBEO (Deputation) 4. ADEO (Deputation) 5. Deputy Director (Deputation) 6. Assistant Project Coordinator (Deputation)	Administrative Post
6.	Senior Lecture	1. Senior Lecturer; 2. Vice Principal 3. Head Master	Administrative & Teaching Post
5.	Lecturer	Lecturer	Teaching Post

== Promotion within the service ==
=== School Level Posts ===
- Lecturer: The entry-level post in the service.
- Senior Lecturer: This post was created in 2025 to replace the "Vice Principal" cadre
- Principal: The Head of Institution for Senior Secondary Schools. Formal administrative duties (such as DDO powers) begin from this rank.
  - Regulation: Up to the rank of Principal, the regulating authority is the Directorate of Secondary Education, Bikaner.

=== Administrative Posts (District & Block Level) ===
After getting promotion from Principal, officers enter in the senior administrative cadre also known as the District Education Officer (DEO) rank. From this rank the regulating authority is the Education Department (State Government).

- District Education Officer (DEO) Rank:
  - At Block Level: Officers posted at the Block level are designated as Chief Block Education Officer (CBEO). They serve as the administrative head of all schools within the block.
  - At District Level: There are two distinct District Education Officer posts at the headquarters.
    - DEO HQ (Elementary)
    - DEO HQ (Secondary)
- Deputy Director (DD) Rank:
  - At District Level: An officer of this rank posted as the head of the district's education administration is designated as the Chief District Education Officer (CDEO).
  - Unified Command: The CDEO supervises both DEO's (Secondary and Elementary) and all CBEO's in the district.
  - Samagra Shiksha: The CDEO serves as the Ex-officio District Project Coordinator (DPC) for the Rajasthan Council of School Education (RCSE), Jaipur managing central schemes and infrastructure budgets.
  - District Authority: The CDEO is the authorized officer to issue district-wide orders, such as declaring local school holidays due to extreme weather conditions (heatwaves or cold waves).

District Education Administration (2018 Reforms)
Administrative Level	Designation	Rank	Role & Responsibilities
District (Apex Level)	Chief District Education Officer (CDEO)	Deputy Director	Overall In-charge: The highest authority in the district; supervises all education wings. Project Role: Acts as the District Project Coordinator (DPC) for Samagra Shiksha.
District (Functional Wing)	1. District Education Officer (Elementary); 2. District Education Officer (Secondary)	District Education Officer	Wing Head: Posted at the HQ to manage specific wings (Elementary or Secondary) functioning under the CDEO.
Block Level	Chief Block Education Officer (CBEO)	District Education Officer	Block Head: Administrative head of the Block exercising unified control over all schools (Class 1–12). The CBEO reports directly to the CDEO regarding the implementation of Samagra Shiksha (SMSA) projects.
Panchayat Level	Panchayat Elementary Education Officer (PEEO)	Principal	Nodal Officer: The Principal of the Senior Secondary School acts as the PEEO to monitor elementary schools in the Gram Panchayat.

=== Divisional and State Level ===
- Joint Director (JD): Officers promoted from Deputy Director to this rank are often posted as the head of an Education Division. The Joint Director supervises education administration across multiple districts.
- Additional Director (AD): This is the highest promotional post within the Rajasthan Educational Service. There are three sanctioned posts of Additional Director.

== See also ==
1. Rajasthan Administrative Service
2. Rajasthan Accounts Service
3. Rajasthan Forest Service
