= Rajasthan Accounts Service =

State civil service in India

Rajasthan Accounts Service Rājasthāna Lekha Sevā
Service Overview
- Also known as: R.A.S.(Accounts)
- Founded: 1954
- State: Rajasthan
- Staff College: HCM Rajasthan State Institute of Public Administration, Jaipur, Rajasthan
- Cadre Controlling Authority: Finance Department, Government of Rajasthan
- Minister Responsible: Bhajanlal Sharma, Chief Minister of Rajasthan
- Legal personality: Governmental; civil service
- Duties: Representative of Finance Department; Financial Advisor; Chief Controller of Budget; Chief Accounting Authority; Chief Internal Auditor
- Current Cadre Strength: 1371 members
- Selection: Rajasthan State and Subordinate Combined Services Competitive Examination
- Association: RAcS Association

Head of the State Civil Services
- Chief Secretary: Rajeev Swaroop, IAS

Rajasthan Accounts Service R.A.S.(Accounts) formed in 1954, is a premier state civil service of Rajasthan. Accounts/Finance officers of the Service posted in all Government departments, government undertakings, autonomous bodies, Urban Local Bodies and Panchayati Raj institutions etc. manage their financial administration.

The Accounts/Finance officers are posted to assist the Head of Departments in attaining a reasonable high standard of financial administration so that financial regularity may be secured all-round by enforcing implicit, observance of rule and orders relating to financial procedure and propriety, and to ensure that the accounts of the departments are maintained efficiently.

The officers of the cadre are known for their knowledge, wisdom and integrity; and are considered as watchdogs of the state exchequer. The members of the service working at higher levels of the government set-up render consultation support regarding maintenance of the financial discipline, to the heads of departments or institutions and administrative Secretaries, as the case may be. The administrative control of RAS(Accounts) cadre is with the Department of Finance, Government of Rajasthan and the officers are governed by Rajasthan Accounts Service Rules 1954.

== Recruitment ==
The recruitment of officers in this service is made through competitive examination held by Rajasthan Public Service Commission Ajmer on the pattern of Union Public Service Commission New Delhi. The examination is conducted annually and is known as Rajasthan State Administrative and Subordinate Services combined competitive examination. The examination is conducted to select officers for Rajasthan Administrative Service, Rajasthan Police Service and Rajasthan Accounts Service and number of other civil services.

== Promotion ==
The first posting in Junior/Ordinary scale is as Accounts Officer in various departments and as Additional Treasury Officer in District Treasury Office. After sufficient experience officer is promoted in Senior scale as Senior Accounts Officer/Treasury Officer and in Selection scale as Chief Accounts Officer and as Comptroller in state universities and in Super-time Scale as Joint Secretary in Finance (Excise) Department, Finance (EAD & Finance Commission) Department, Finance (Budget) Department, Finance (Ways & Means) Department, Finance (Rules), Finance (Revenue) etc. and Financial Advisors (FA) in various departments and in Higher Super-time Scale as Director, Treasuries and Accounts Department; Director, Inspection Department; Director, Local Fund Audit Department; Director, Pension and Pensioners' Welfare Department; Director (Budget), Finance Department etc and as Joint Secretary in Finance (Expenditure-3) Department, Secretariat, Finance (Expenditure-4) Department, Finance (Expenditure-5) Department, Finance (Rules) Department, Finance (Audit) Department; etc. Some officers of outstanding performance get a promotion in Indian Administrative Service.
