= HCM Rajasthan State Institute of Public Administration =

Civil service training institute in Jaipur, India

Harish Chandra Mathur Rajasthan State Institute of Public Administration
- Abbreviation: HCM RSIPA
- Formation: 1957
- Type: Civil Service Training Institute
- Legal status: Active
- Location: Jawhar Lal Nehru Marg, Jaipur, Rajasthan, India
- Region served: Rajasthan
- Members: Rajasthan Civil Servants
- Director General: Sreya Guha, IAS
- Parent organization: Government of Rajasthan
- Website: https://hcmripa.rajasthan.gov.in/

HCM Rajasthan State Institute of Public Administration is a state level civil service training institute of the Government of Rajasthan for training of civil servants. It is situated in Jaipur. The principal objective to contribute for the improvement of state administration through training, system research and management consultancy and to develop positive attitude and skill.

HCM RIPA has four Regional Training Centres located at Udaipur, Bikaner, Jodhpur and Kota. It conducts the foundational training for officials recruited to various state services, viz. Rajasthan Administrative Service, Rajasthan Police Service, Rajasthan Accounts Service, and others. It also organizes professional training for the officers of Indian Administrative Service (Allotted to Rajasthan).

The institute is named after the former Minister of Rajasthan, late Harish Chandra Mathur, in recognition of his contributions to the state.
