= Rajasthan Forest Service =

State service of the Government of Rajasthan, India

The Rajasthan Forest Service (RFS) is one of the state services of the Government of Rajasthan, the prominent two being the Rajasthan Administrative Service (RAS) and the Rajasthan Police Service (RPS). The officers of Rajasthan Forest Service are governed by the provisions of The Rajasthan Forest Service Rules, 1962.

== Posts ==
RFS officers start service as Assistant Conservator of Forests (ACF) (Hindi: सहायक वन संरक्षक) and Forest Range Officer (FRO) (Hindi: वन रेंज अधिकारी) in training period. The senior position among these is the ACF, which after considerable time, gets promoted to Deputy Conservator of Forests (DCF) (Hindi: उप वन संरक्षक). There are five salary-scales in RFS.

== Recruitment ==
Officers are recruited through an open competitive examination conducted by the RPSC. A separate competitive exam is conducted for recruitment of following officers of the service -
1. Assistant Conservator of Forest (ACF)
2. Forest Range Officer (FRO).
Recently, the Government of Rajasthan has given "out of turn" appointment to 29 sports medallists to different state services, including appointment of 5 sports medallists as Assistant Conservator of Forests (ACF) in RFS.
