= Rajasthan Police =

Law enforcement agency in Rajasthan, India

- Emblem of the Rajasthan Police
- Common name: Rajasthan Police Services
- Abbreviation: RJ Police
- Motto: Sevarth Katibaddhata सेवार्थ कटिबद्धता Committed to serve

Agency overview
- Formed: January 1951; 75 years ago
- Superseding agency: Rajasthan Home Department
- Employees: 100,000 (2025)

Jurisdictional structure
- Operations jurisdiction: Rajasthan, India
- Map of Rajasthan Police Department's jurisdiction
- Area: 342,239 km² (132,139 sq mi)
- Population: 73,529,325 (2015)
- Governing body: Government of Rajasthan
- General nature: Local civilian police

Operational structure
- Headquarters: Jaipur
- Agency executive: Rajeev Kumar Sharma (IPS), Director General of Police
- Parent agency: Home Department Rajasthan

Website
- police.rajasthan.gov.in

The Rajasthan Police (RP) is the law enforcement agency for the state of Rajasthan, working under the Rajasthan Home Department. As of 2025, it had over 100,000 personnel, making it one of India’s largest state police forces. It handles law enforcement, border security, and crime control through units like Anti-Terrorism Squad, RAC, and Cyber Crime Cell.

== History ==
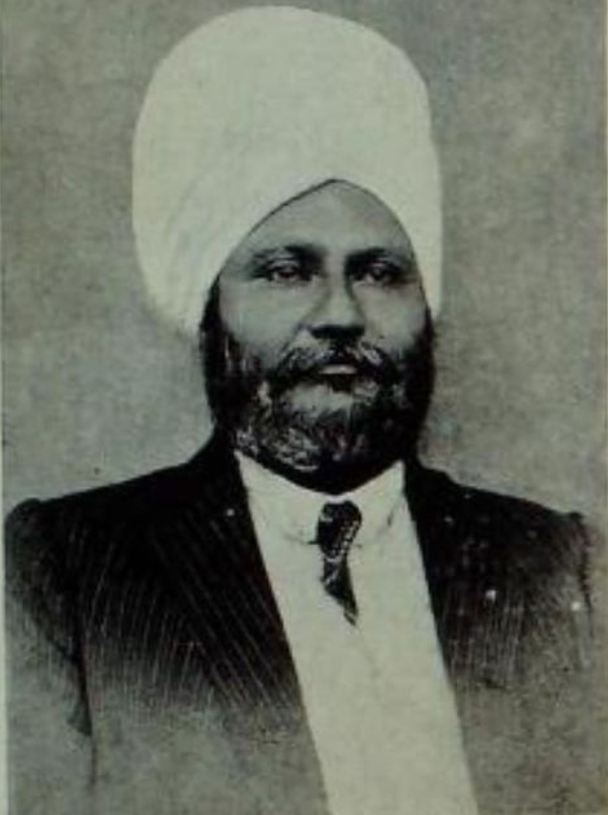
Sardar Bahadur, Inspector General of Jodhpur State Police, Shamsher Singh of Mianpur.

The first Director General of Rajasthan Police was R. Banerjee, although he credited Shamsher Singh of Mianpur, the Inspector General of Police of Jodhpur State, as the true founder of the Rajasthan Police.

== Organization ==
The Rajasthan Police is headed by the Director General of Police. The DGP is supported by senior officers holding the ranks of Additional Director General, Inspector General, Deputy Inspector General, Additional Inspector General (AIG), and Superintendent of Police. The force functions under the administrative control of the Department of Home, Government of Rajasthan. For effective governance and operational efficiency, the state police is organized into various divisions, units, zones, and ranges.

=== Hierarchy ===
==== Gazetted Officers ====
- Director General of Police (DGP)
- Additional Director General of Police (ADGP)
- Inspector General of Police (IG)/ Commissioner (In Commissionerate)
- Deputy Inspector General of Police (DIG)/ Joint Commissioner (In Commissionerate)
- Superintendent of Police (SP)/ Deputy Commissioner (In Commissionerate)
- Additional Superintendent of Police (ADSP)/ Additional Deputy Commissioner (In Commissionerate)
- Assistant Superintendent of Police(ASP)/ Assistant Commissioner (In Commissionerate)
- Deputy Superintendent of Police (DSP) / Sub Divisional Police Officer / Assistant Commissioner (In Commissionerate)

==== Non-gazetted Officers ====
- Inspector of Police/Circle Inspector
- Sub Inspector of Police (SI)
- Assistant Sub Inspector of Police (ASI)
- Head Constable (HC)
- Senior Constable (SC)
- Police Constable (PC)

=== Legal Framework ===
In 2007, the Government of Rajasthan enacted the Rajasthan Police Act, 2007, which became the first formal legislative framework governing the powers, duties, structure, and responsibilities of the state police force. The Act aimed to modernize policing, improve accountability, and align the force with democratic and human rights principles. It also established guidelines for community policing, police oversight bodies, and the functioning of different wings within the department.

== Recruitment and service ==
Recruitment is generally through the Rajasthan Public Service Commission (RPSC), which conducts a state-level examination called the Rajasthan Administrative Service/Subordinate Services Exam (RAS). After passing the exam, recruits undergo training at RPA Jaipur and RPTC. They are governed by Rajasthan Service Rules. The nine organizational units are: the Crime Branch, the Rajasthan Armed Constabulary (RAC), the State Special Branch, the Anti-Terrorism Squad (ATS), Planning and Welfare, Training, Forensic Science Laboratory, Telecommunications, and the Traffic Police.

As of 2023, the Rajasthan Police has employed 110,153 personnel.

== Insignia of Rajasthan Police ==
Gazetted Officers

Indian Police Service cadre officers rank insignia
Insignia
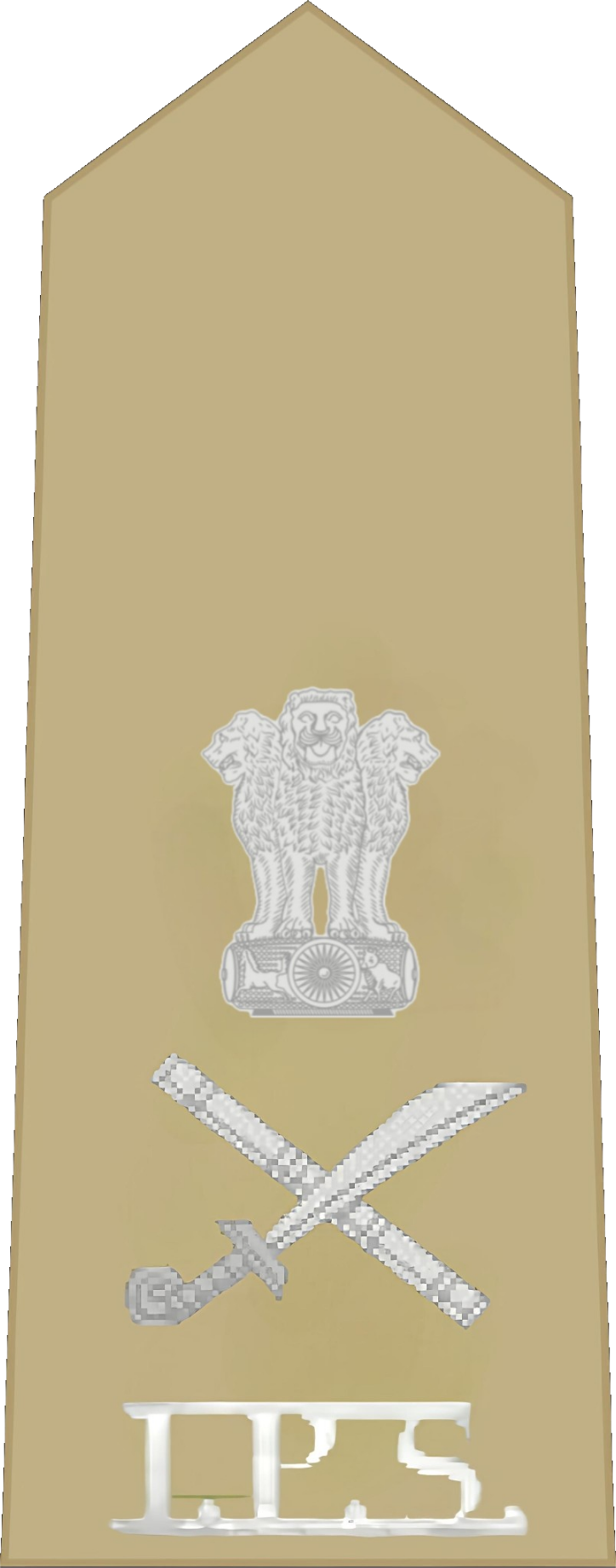
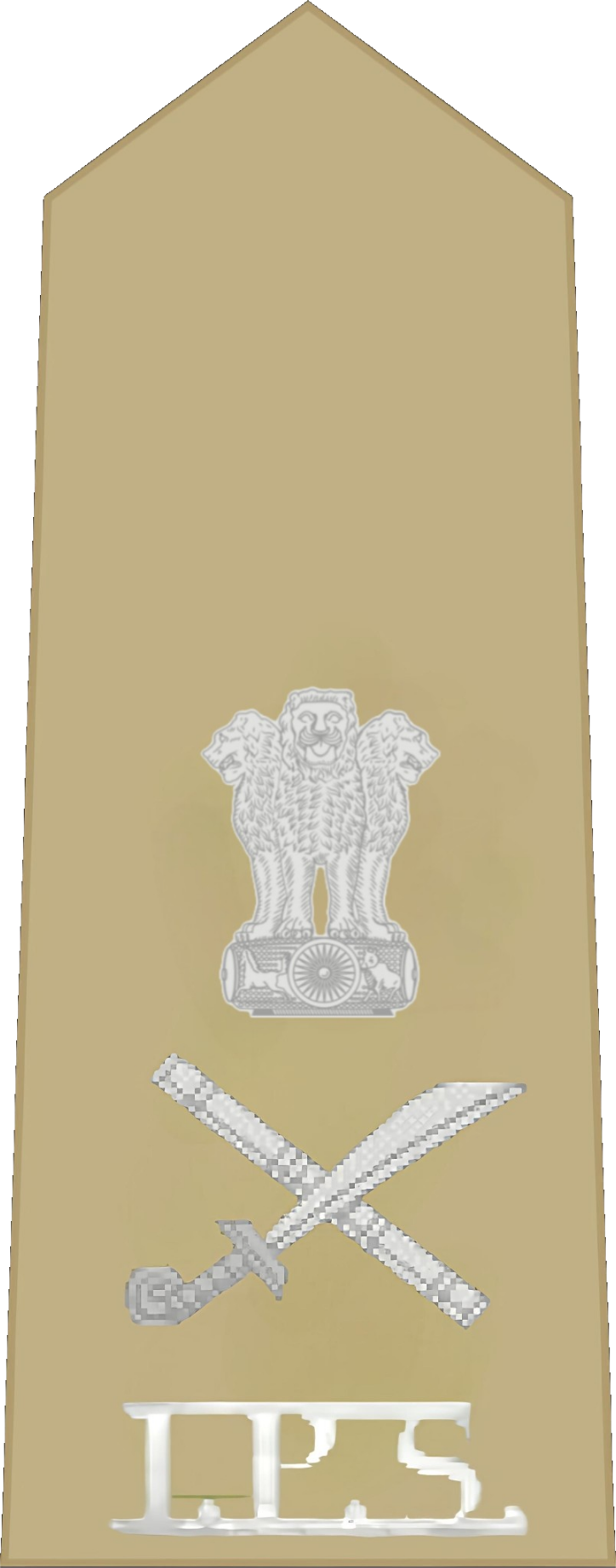
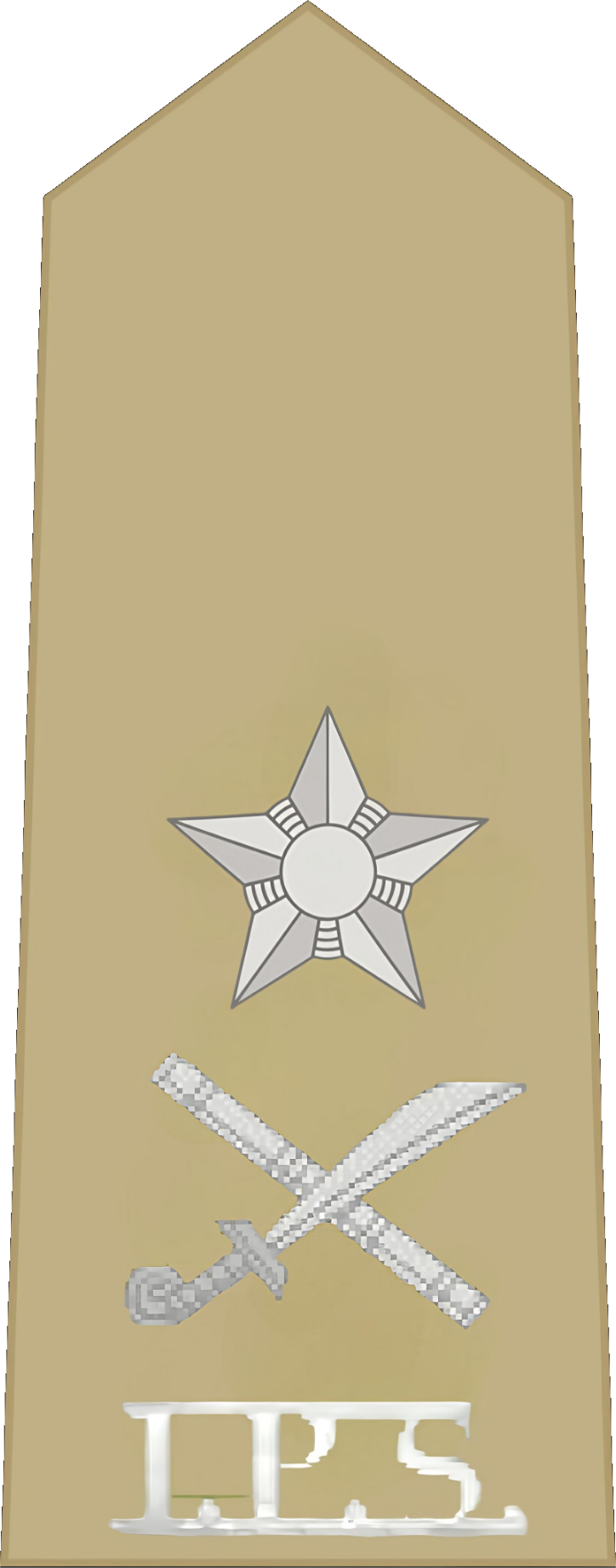
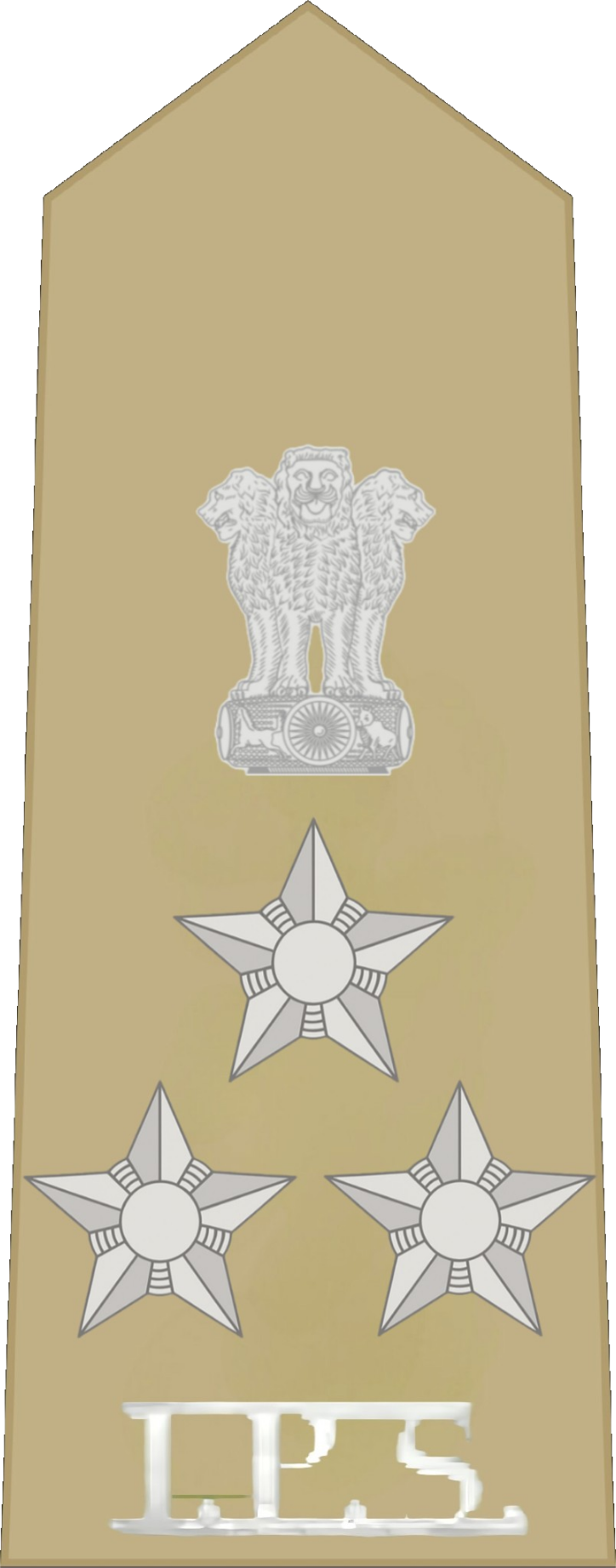
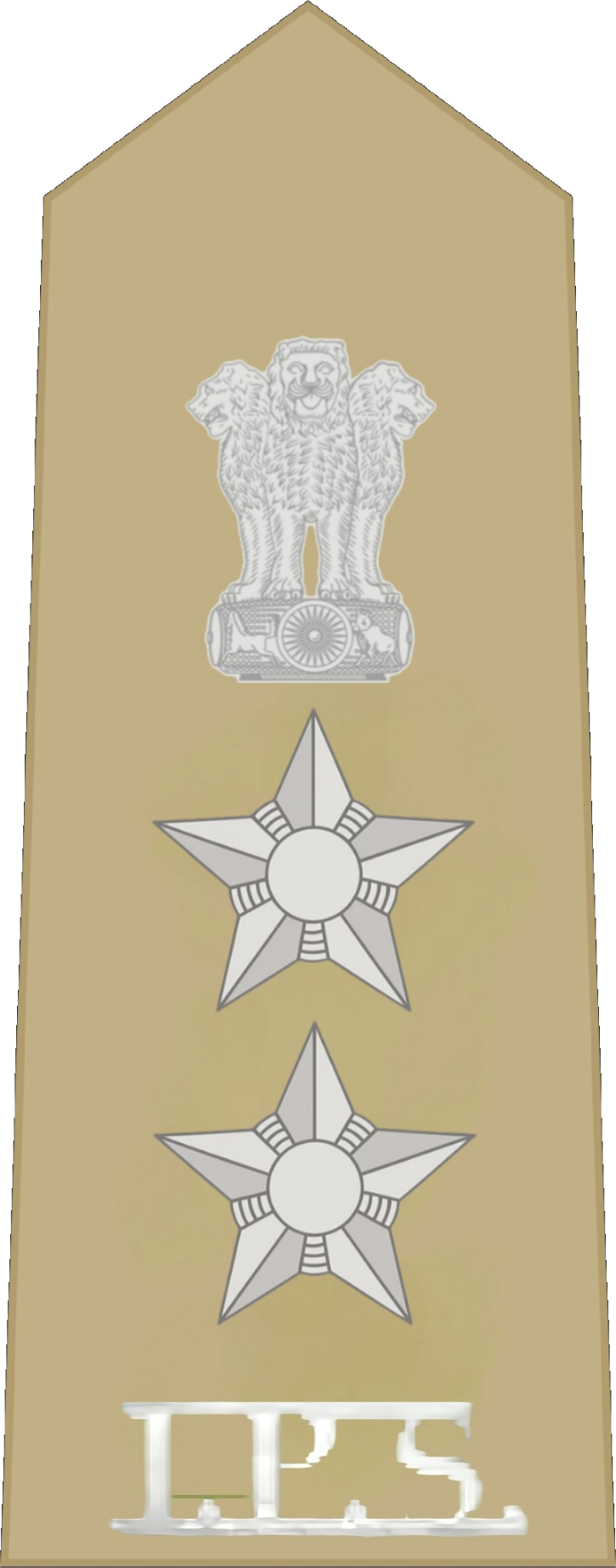
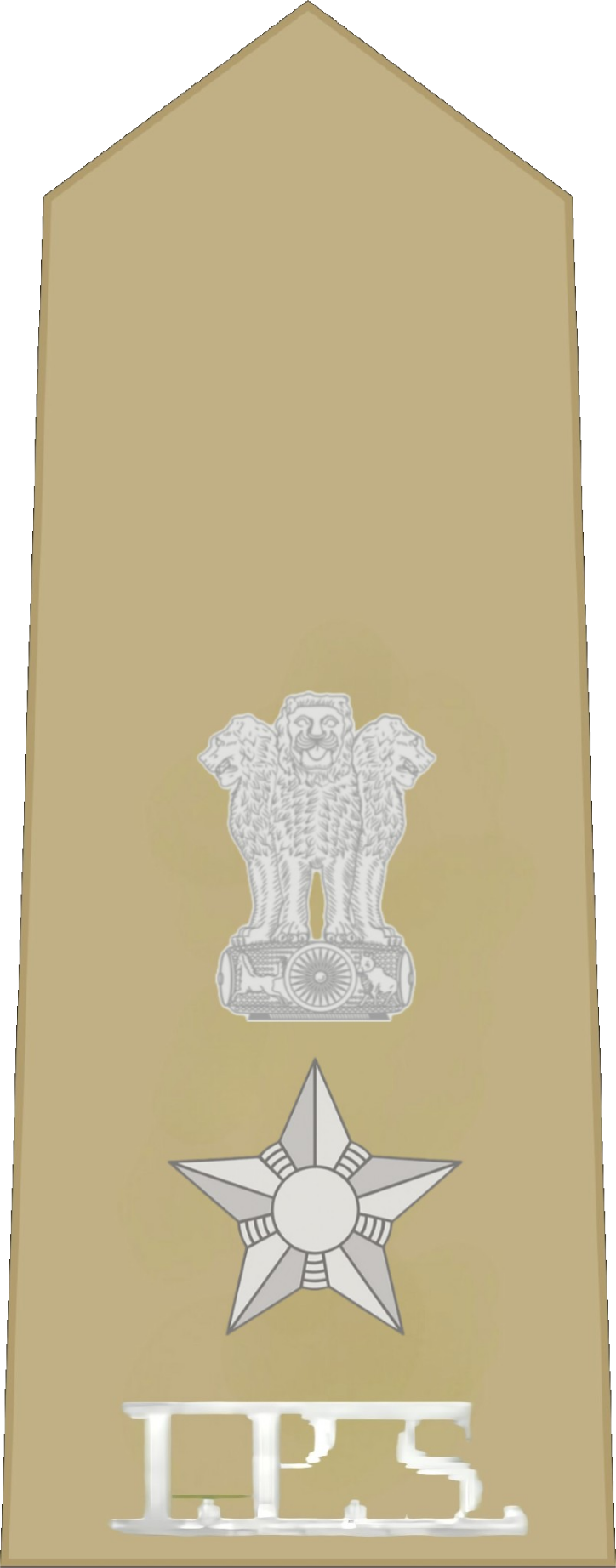
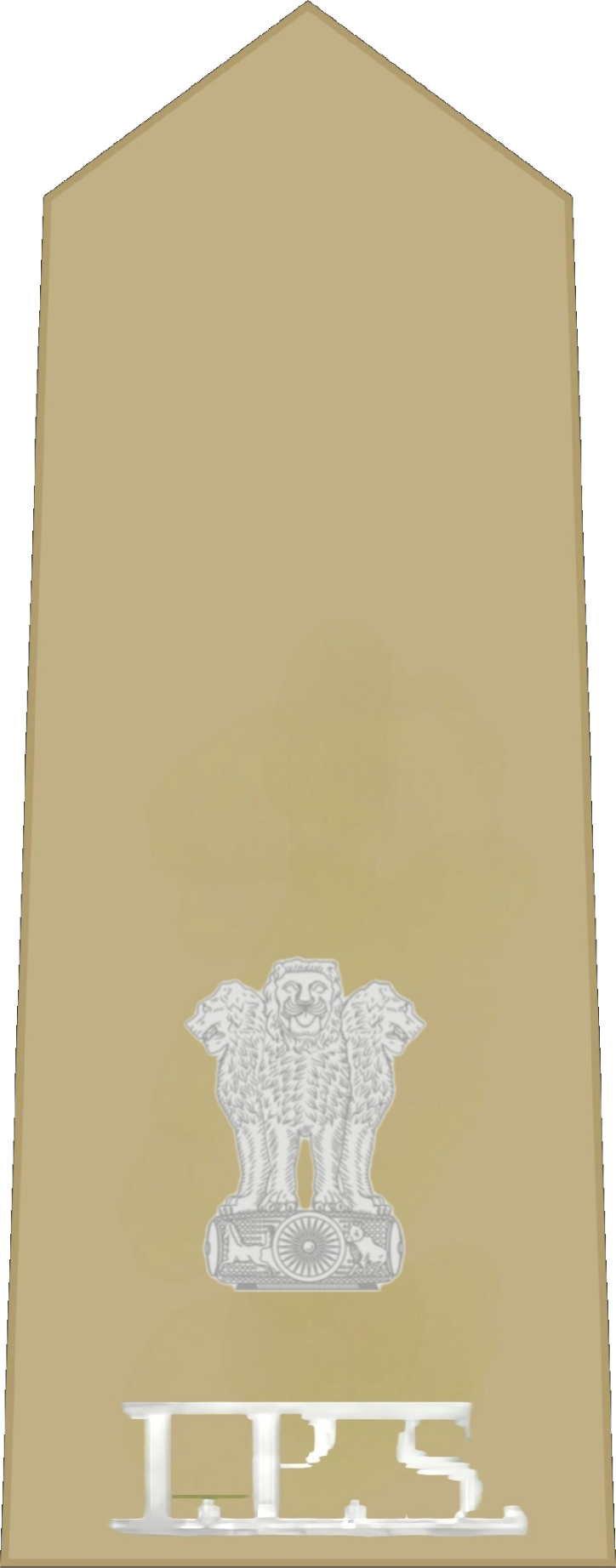
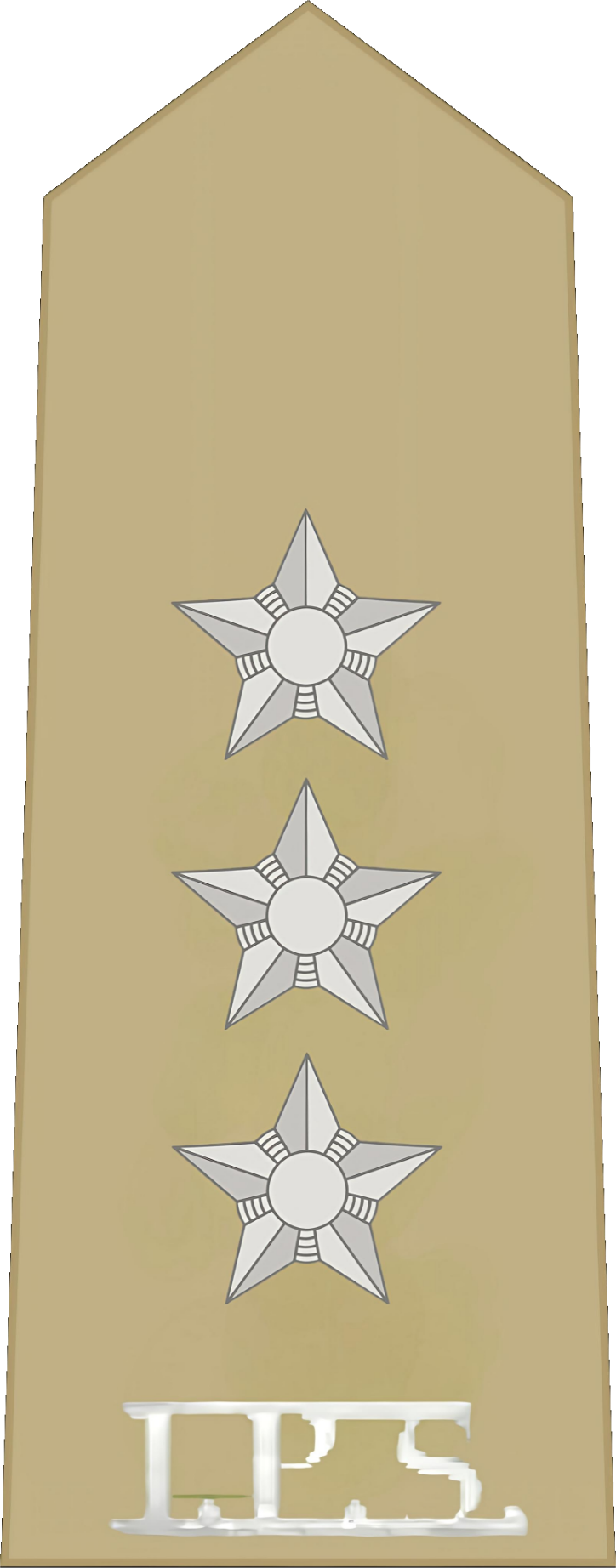
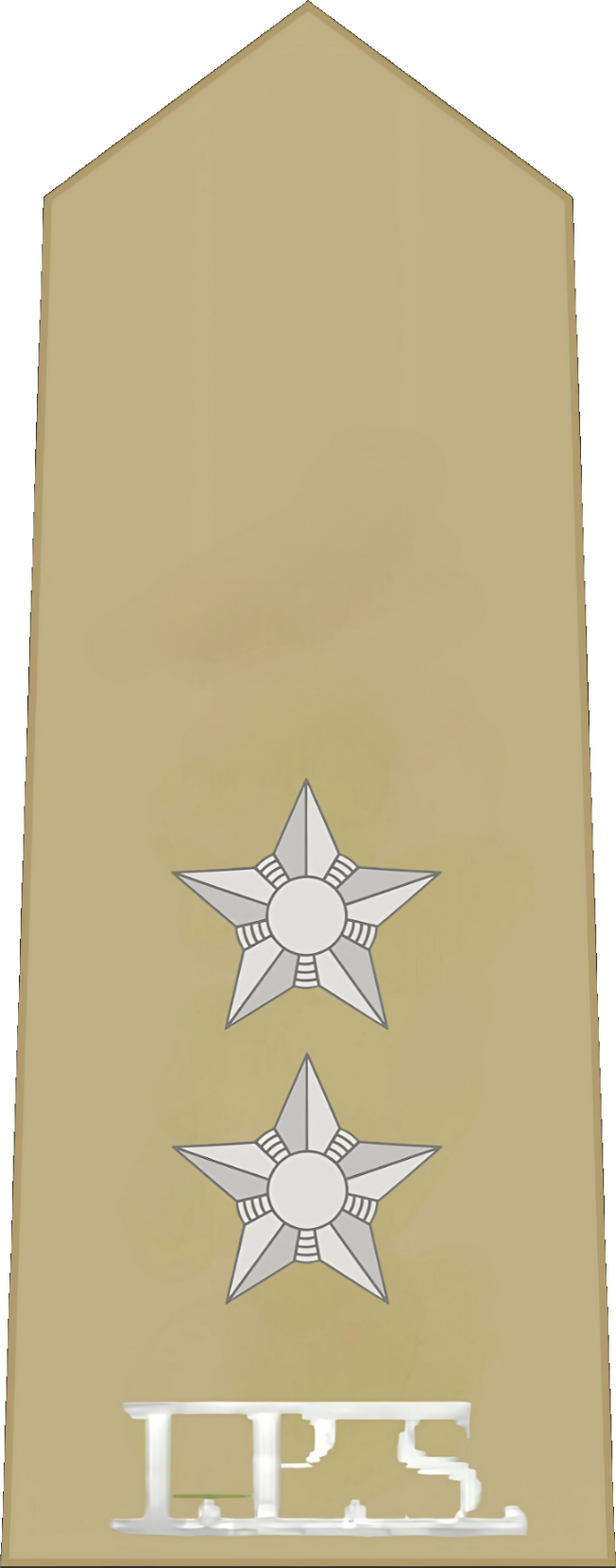
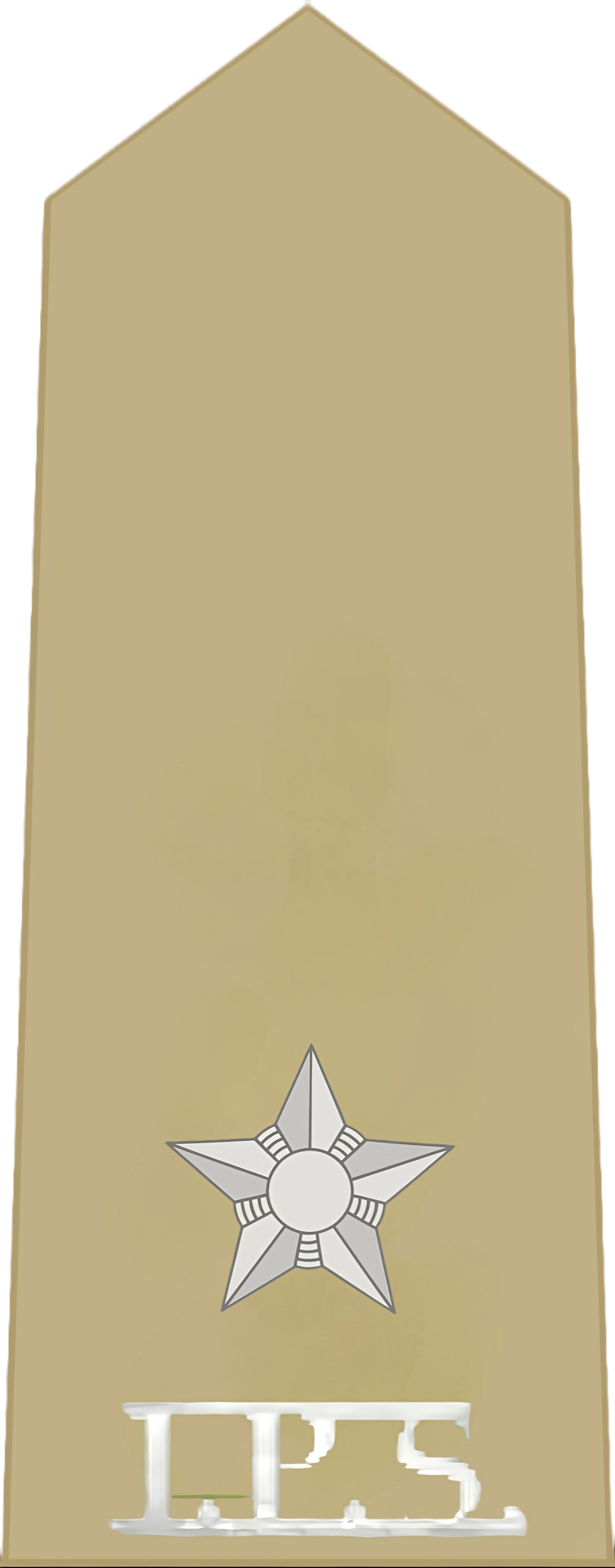
Rank
Director General of Police
Additional Director General of Police (Note: Rank insignia of DGP is similar to Additional DGP.)
Inspector General of Police
Deputy Inspector General of Police
Superintendent of Police (Selection Grade) (Note: The Senior Superintendent of Police (SSP) is a post, not a rank, typically held by an SP (selection grade or junior grade) in states like Uttar Pradesh, Jammu and Kashmir, and Punjab.)
Superintendent of Police
Additional superintendent of police
Assistant Superintendent of Police
Assistant superintendent of police (Probationary for two years)
Assistant Superintendent of Police (Probationary for one year)
Abbreviation
DGP
ADGP
IGP
DIGP
SP (SG)
SP
Addl.SP
ASP
ASP
ASP

- Note 1: The rank insignia of DGP, Spl.DGP, Addl.DGP is the same.
- Note 2: The equivalent rank to the ASP (Asst.SP) in State Police Services is the deputy superintendent of police (DSP/DySP).
- Note 3: The commissioner of police is a post typically held by DIG and above rank officers.

Non-gazetted officers

Indian Police non-gazetted officers rank insignia
Insignia
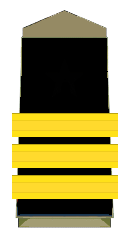
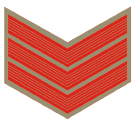
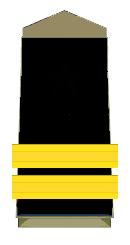
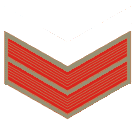
No insignia
Rank
Inspector of Police
Inspector / Circle Inspector (Note: Inspector or Circle Inspector with One Five-Pointed Star insignia exists in West Bengal Police.)
Assistant Police Inspector (Note: This rank exists only in the Maharashtra Police.)
Sub-Inspector
Sergeant (Kolkata Police)
Assistant Sub-Inspector
Head Constable (Note: Shoulder insignia rank only used in the Maharashtra Police.)
Senior Constable (Note: This rank is also known as senior constable, constable grade-I, and exists only in some state police forces.)
Police constable
Abbreviation
INSP
INSP / CO
API
SI
Sgt
ASI
HC
SC
PC

- The rank of Sergeant is used in India only in the Bihar Police and the Kolkata Police
- The One Five Pointed Star for the rank of Inspector is used by Police forces of 7 states viz. West Bengal, Jharkhand, Bihar, Sikkim, Assam, Nagaland and Tripura. This is because Inspectors of Police in these 7 states are Gazetted Officers. However, the Kolkata Police uses the Four Pointed Star of the Order of Bath for the ranks of Inspector and Assistant Commissioner of Police instead of Five Pointed Star. For the ranks of ASI, SI/Sergeant and Deputy Commissioner of Police, the usual Five Pointed Star is used
- Colour pattern and size of chevrons may vary according to the different rules of several distinct Indian State Police services.

== Present scenario ==
Over the years, Rajasthan Police has dealt with the responsibility of dealing with bandits (dacoits) and organized crime. With tensions high between India and Pakistan, the police department has responsibilities to deal with border security between the two countries. These responsibilities can range from dealing with organized crime rings and smuggling to dealing with illegal entry and enforcing border authority with a border spanning from across the 1,040 kilometres (650 mi) long border with Pakistan, as well as the Chambal ravines. The Rajasthan Police is headed by the Director General of Police (DGP).

As of the beginning of 2025, Rajasthan is divided into 2 police commission rates and 8 police ranges, each headed by an Inspector General of Police (IGP). The state is further divided into 57 districts (including 3 rural districts, 2 city districts in Jaipur City, and 2 railway police districts), 261 circles, 1014 police stations, and 1283 outposts. The force had 1181 inspectors, 2554 sub-inspectors, 4767 assistant sub-Inspectors, 15,911 head constables, and 71,858 constables, and about 195 Indian Police Service (IPS) and 876 Rajasthan Police Service (RPS) officers.

== ERT Commandos ==
The ERT (Emergency Response Team) is the commando unit of the Rajasthan Police raised for emergency law and order situations and is attached to RAC. They usually operate in close coordination with the ATS (Anti-Terrorism Squad) and SOG (Special Operations Group). They are trained by the Army and retired NSG officers in urban warfare, hostage situations, and crowd control. Notably, they played a significant role in the encounter with gangster Anand Pal Singh.

== Rajasthan Armed Constabulary (RAC) ==
=== List of RAC Battalion Units ===
- 1st Battalion – Jodhpur
- 2nd Battalion – Kota
- 3rd Battalion – Bikaner
- 4th Battalion – Jaipur
- 5th Battalion – Jaipur
- 6th Battalion – Dholpur
- 7th Battalion – Bharatpur
- 8th Battalion – Delhi
- 9th Battalion – Tonk
- 10th Battalion – Bikaner
- 11th Battalion – Delhi
- 12th Battalion – Delhi
- 13th Battalion – Jail Security
- 14th Battalion – Bharatpur

State Disaster Rescue Force

- Mewar Bhil 1st Corps – Kherwara, Udaipur
- Mewar Bhil 2nd Corps – Banswara
- Hadi Rani Mahila Battalion – Ajmer
- Maharana Pratap Battalion – Pratapgarh
- Rani Padmini Battalion – Sikar (New 2025)
- Kali Bai Battalion – (New 2025)
- Amrita Devi Battalion – (New 2025)

== See also ==
- Mewar Bhil Corps
- Indian Police Service
- Rajasthan Police Academy
- Rajasthan Police Service
- Rajasthan Administrative Service
- Rajasthan Public Service Commission
- Police forces of the states and union territories of India
