= Jai Narain Vyas University =

University in Jodhpur, India

- University seal
- Former name: University of Jodhpur
- Type: Public
- Established: 1962 (64 years ago)
- Affiliations: UGC, ACU
- Chancellor: Governor of Rajasthan
- Vice-Chancellor: Pawan Kumar Sharma
- Location: Jodhpur, Rajasthan, India; 26.245°N 73.019°E
- Campus: Urban, 650.7 acres
- Website: jnvu.co.in

Jai Narain Vyas University (JNVU) is an educational institution in Jodhpur, Rajasthan, India. Many of its research and development activities focus on the heritage, society, and challenges of the Thar Desert region, in which it is located. As the westernmost university of the country, research is conducted in border areas with Pakistan.

== History ==
Jai Narain Vyas University is the second university in the state of Rajasthan. The Jodhpur University Act (Act XVII), enacted by the state legislature for the Unitary Teaching University, combined the state colleges Jaswant and Shri Maharaj Kumar College (Faculty of Commerce campus, Faculty of Law, Institute of Evening Studies, and undergraduate Faculty of Arts campus), New Campus, and Kamla Nehru Girls College (multi-faculty constituent college campus). Shah Goverdhan Lal Kabra Teachers' College, a formerly private university, has joined JNVU since. The university received University Grants Commission (UGC) recognition as a university on 14 July 1962 and Sarvepalli Radhakrishnan opened the university on 24 August 1962. Jaswant and Shri Maharaj Kumar Colleges were converted into the Faculties of Arts, Commerce, Law, Science, and Social Sciences, while M.B.M. and Kamla Nehru retained their identities. In 2021, M.B.M. became an independent institution.

The name changed from Jodhpur University to Jai Narain Vyas University on 12 February 1992 to honour the late Jai Narayan Vyas. In February 2022, K. L. Shrivastava was appointed Vice Chancellor.

== Campuses ==
The Jai Narain Vyas University has three campuses: New Campus, Jaswant Campus (a.k.a. Old Campus), K. N. College for Women. The Jaswant Campus which is main campus is located on 20.45 hectares (50.5 acres) with buildings concentrated on 16,335 m^{2} (175,830 sq ft) area. New Campus is home to the Faculties of Science, Arts, Education, and Social Sciences, as well as the university press, universal scientific instrumental courses, central library, maintenance cell, gymnasium, sports facilities, and hostels for males and post-graduate females. It spans 263.31 hectares (650.7 acres), 74,003 m^{2} (796,560 sq ft) of which is built up. The Women's College takes up 15,885 m^{2} (170,980 sq ft) of a 4.04 hectares (10.0 acres) tract of land. In total, 152,288 m^{2} (1,639,210 sq ft) of the 315.40 hectares (779.4 acres) are constructed areas.

=== Affiliated colleges ===
With JNVU's jurisdiction extending over five districts, including Barmer, Jaisalmer, Jalore, and Pali in addition to Jodhpur, it has a number of affiliated colleges, including Aishwarya College of Education in Jodhpur.

== Notable alumni ==
- Dalveer Bhandari (Faculties of Humanities and Law), judge in the International Court of Justice and the Supreme Court of India
- Ravindra Singh Bhati (BA, LLB), Rajasthani state legislator
- Ravi Bhushan, Professor
- Ashok Gehlot (BSc, LLB), Chief Minister of Rajasthan
- Aiyub Khan, Professor, Department of Mathematics and Statistics, Member of Rajasthan Public Service Commission
- Rajendra Mal Lodha, Chief Justice of India
- Dinesh Maheshwari (LL.B), judge
- Gajendra Singh Shekhawat (MA, MPhil), cabinet minister
- Ashok Kumar Singhvi (BSc), geoscientist

== See also ==
- S. R. Goyal
- List of institutions of higher education in Rajasthan
