= Bhupendra Yadav =

Indian Police Service officer of 1986 batch

Bhupendra Singh Yadav

Chairman, Rajasthan Public Service Commission
- In office 14 October 2020 – December 2021
- Preceded by: Deepak Upreti
- Succeeded by: Shiv Singh Rathore

DGP, Rajasthan
- In office July 2019 – 14 October 2020
- Preceded by: Kapil Garg
- Succeeded by: Mohan Lal Lather

Personal details
- Born: 2 December 1959 (age 66) Haryana, India
- Education: MBBS, MA
- Occupation: IPS officer
- Profession: Civil Service
- Awards: President's Police Medal; Police Medal

Dr.Bhupendra Singh Yadav (born 2 December 1959) is the Director General of Police of Rajasthan in the Indian Police Service. Yadav is an IPS officer of the 1986 "batch". He has been awarded the Police Medal and President's Police Medal in 2002 and 2016 respectively.

== Education ==
He is a resident of Rajasthan, Dr. Bhupendra Singh Yadav, also holds an MBBS degree. He is a 1986 batch IPS of Rajasthan cadre.

== Career ==
Dr. Bhupendra Yadav's first posting was in 1988 as Assistant Superintendent of Police Kota. He has served as SP in four districts. Yadav served as an important responsibility of Bharatpur Range IG. He also served on deputation to the CBI for four years as SP. He had the longest tenure as director of Rajasthan Police Academy. He was Director from 31 October 2007 to 6 March 2013. During his tenure as RPA director, he undertook significant reforms at the academy. He has also been the Pro Vice Chancellor of Sardar Patel Police University. Yadav joined the Director General Cadre held in July 2018. After taking VRS from IPS Rajasthan Cadre, the government of Rajasthan appointed him as RPSC Chairman on 14 October 2020.
