= Aiyub Khan =

Indian professor and politician

Aiyub Khan (born on 1 July 1967) is a professor of mathematics in Jai Narain Vyas University, and politician in Rajasthan from Indian national congress of Soorsagar constituency Jodhpur candidate in 2018. Khan is member of Rajasthan Public Service Commission.

== Education ==
Khan did his education in Jai Narain Vyas University, he did PhD under supervision of Prem Kumar Bhatia, in 1993. Khan is Fellow of Royal Astronomical Society

== Career ==
Khan worked in SD PG college, Sriganganagar before joining Jai Narain Vyas University . Presently he is active in politics and also member of Rajasthan Public Service Commission, under his supervision 4 students have done PhD. Khan is member of nine professional academies . Khan is member of Academic council of Jai Narain Vyas University.
