= Aishwarya College of Education =

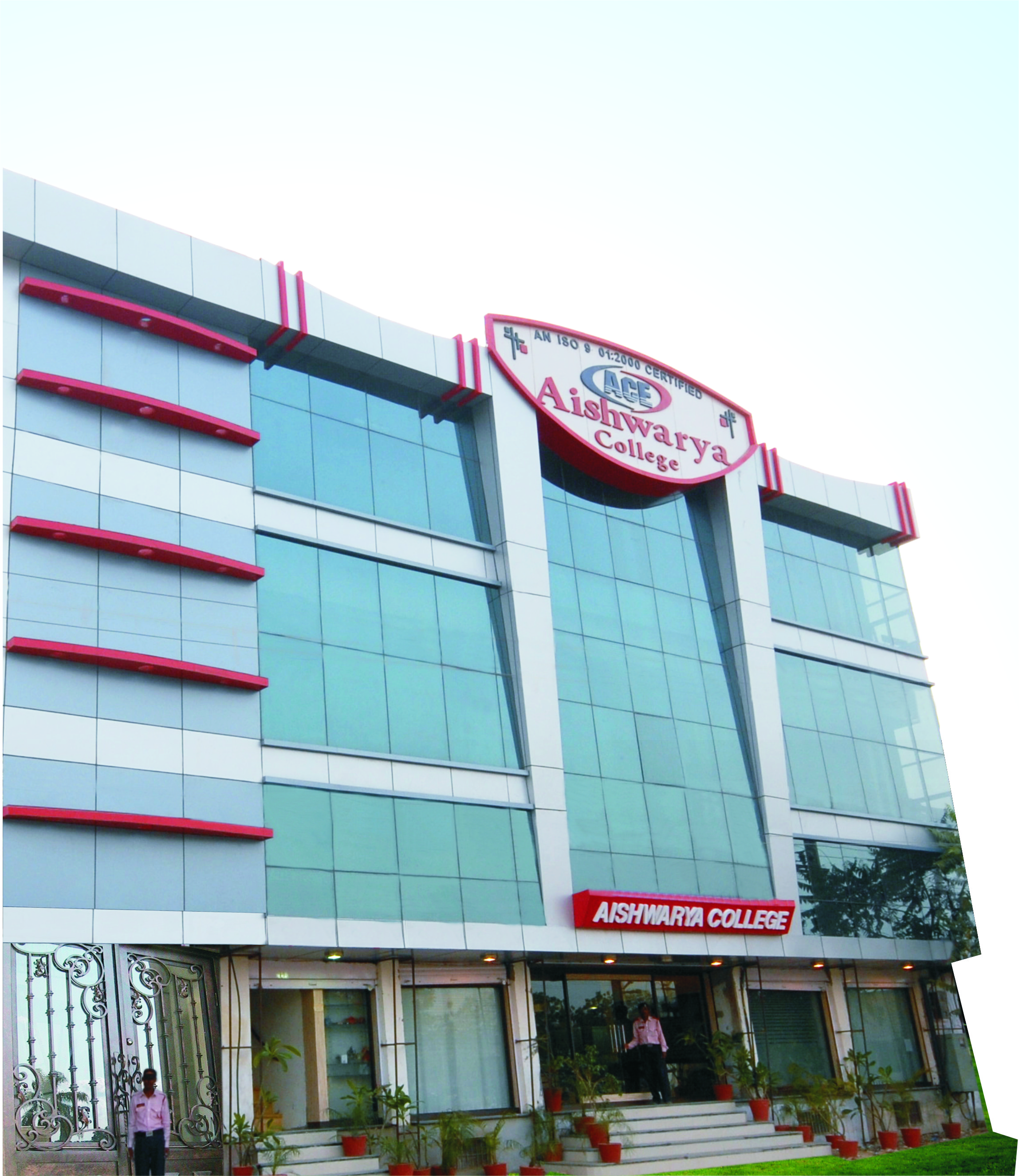
- Type: NGO
- Established: 1999
- Affiliations: Jai Narain Vyas University; Rajasthan Technical University
- Chairperson: Bhupendra Singh Rathore
- Students: 3000+
- Location: Jodhpur, Rajasthan, India; 26.284°N 72.989°E
- Campus: A-9, 1st Extension, Kamla Nehru Nagar, Jodhpur, Rajasthan
- Website: www.aishwaryacollege.edu.in

Aishwarya College of Education (ACE) is a college in Jodhpur, Rajasthan. It is located in Kamla Nehru Nagar, Jodhpur. It is affiliated to Jai Narain Vyas University and Rajasthan Technical University. It was established in 1999.

== History ==
Aishwarya College of Education established in 1999. It is affiliated to one of Jodhpur's oldest and most famous universities Jai Narain Vyas University and Rajasthan Technical University.

This college teaches almost 3000 students, and the current chairperson is Bhupendra Singh Rathore.
