= Sarat Kumar Ghosh =

Indian civil servant and jurist (1879-1963)

Sir Sarat Kumar Ghosh
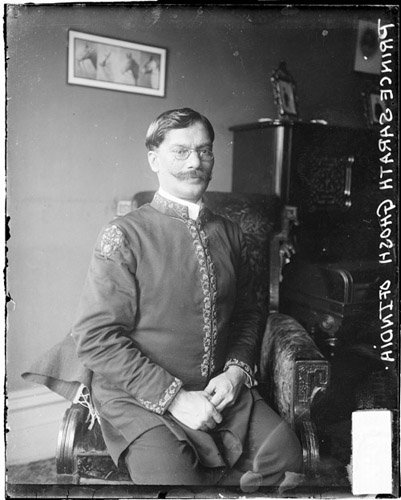
- Sarath Grosh photographed in Chicago

1st Chairman of Rajasthan Public Service Commission
- In office 1 April 1949 – 25 January 1950
- Appointed by: Sawai Man Singh II (Rajpramukh of Rajasthan)
- Preceded by: Position established
- Succeeded by: S. C. Tripathi

Chief Justice of Jaipur High Court
- In office 1948–1949
- Appointed by: Sawai Man Singh II
- Succeeded by: Position abolished (merged into Rajasthan High Court)

6th Chief Justice of Jammu & Kashmir High Court
- In office 29 March 1946 – 29 March 1948
- Appointed by: Hari Singh
- Preceded by: Ganga Nath
- Succeeded by: Janki Nath Wazir

Judge of Calcutta High Court
- In office September 1929 – 28 March 1946
- Appointed by: George V

Personal details
- Born: 3 July 1879 Calcutta, Bengal Presidency, British India
- Died: 8 January 1963 (aged 83) Calcutta, West Bengal, India
- Spouse(s): Niraja Nalini Dé, Lady Ghosh
- Relations: Brajendranath De (father-in-law)
- Parent: Tarini Kumar Ghosh
- Education: Presidency College, Calcutta, Trinity College, Cambridge
- Occupation: Civil servant, Judge

Sir Sarat Kumar Ghosh or Ghose, ICS (3 July 1879 – 8 January 1963) was an Indian civil servant and a jurist.

== Background and education ==
He was the son of Rai Bahadur Tarini Kumar Ghosh, Inspector General of Registration of the Government of Bengal. He was a student of Mitra Institution, Calcutta and Presidency College, Calcutta, where he earned first-class honours. He was married to Niraj Nalini Ghosh (née De), the third daughter of Brajendranath De, the 8th Indian member of the Indian Civil Service. After his marriage he went to Trinity College, Cambridge where he successfully took the Open Competitive Service Examination, joining the judicial wing of the service. He joined the ICS in 1903. He was also called to the Bar by The Honourable Society of the Inner Temple.

== Career ==
He was the Additional Judge of Chittagong, District Judge of Comilla and then the District Judge of Hooghly in 1929. Later, he appointed as a Puisne Judge of the Calcutta High Court. He was conferred a knighthood in 1938. He became the Chief Justice of the Indian Princely State of Jaipur and then the last Chief Justice of the Indian Princely State of Kashmir from 29 March 1946 to 29 March 1948. He was one of the last officials of the former regime in Kashmir to have left the state just before the first Indo-Pakistan war broke out in 1948. At the time of India's independence he became the Interim Chief Justice of the High Court of Rajasthan. He was also first Chairperson of the Rajasthan Public Service Commission.

== Later life ==
After returning from Rajasthan, the Government of West Bengal appointed him as Judge of a one-man Tribunal to deal with cases involving communist insurgents in the state.

Through the 1950s he was a Steward of the Royal Calcutta Turf Club, a position he retained until the end of his life.
