= Ravi Bhushan =

Indian chemist (born 1953)

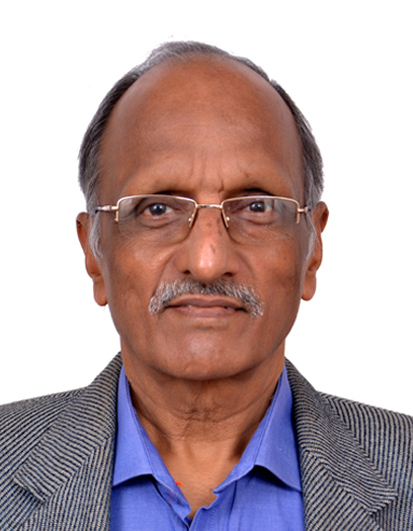
- Ravi Bhushan
- Born: 12 April 1953; Muzaffarnagar, Uttar Pradesh, India
- Education: BSc at University of Jodhpur; MSc at University of Jodhpur; PhD at University of Jodhpur
- Alma mater: University of Jodhpur
- Known for: Analytical chemistry
- Scientific career
- Institutions: Indian Institute of Technology Roorkee
- Thesis: (1978)
- Doctoral advisor: Ramesh Chandra Kapoor

Ravi Bhushan (born 12 April 1953, in Muzaffarnagar, India) was a Professor of Chemistry at Indian Institute of Technology Roorkee who worked in the areas of natural products chemistry, protein chemistry, and chiral analysis by liquid chromatography.

== Education and academic career ==
Bhushan began his education in his native India, completing his undergraduate and master's degrees from the University of Jodhpur. He received his Ph.D. in chemistry (working on structure elucidation of natural products isolated from certain desert plants) in 1978 at the University of Jodhpur. Bhushan joined as a lecturer at the University of Roorkee (now Indian Institute of Technology Roorkee, India) in 1979 and was later selected for the position of full professor of chemistry in 1996 and served there till retirement in 2018.

=== Research ===
He started his research in the chemistry of natural products. At Washington State University he established early steps in the metabolism of d-neomethyl-α-D-glucoside in pipermint (Mentha piperita) rhizomes via in vivo studies. Bhushan developed a de novo method for direct resolution of certain racemates by liquid chromatography. Later, the approach was applied for direct enantioseparation of several active pharmaceutical ingredients (APIs). It is now an established approach in literature. 1994 onwards, the method was extended to such resolutions by ligand exchange principle. The method is of significant importance to pharmaceutical industry and analytical laboratories associated with regulatory agencies for determination and control of enantiomeric purity (and isolation of native enantiomers) of a variety of APIs since many of them are marketed and administered as racemic mixture while only one enantiomer is therapeutically useful.

Bhushan supervised the Ph.D. theses of > 30 scholars and has published more than 270 research papers.

=== Editorial work ===
Bhushan is a member of editorial board of

- Biomedical Chromatography, (John Wiley & Sons, UK, since Jan 1996);
- Bioanalysis (Future Science Group, UK, since 2011), and
- Acta Chromatographica (Akademiai Kiado, Hungary, since 2012).

== Honours and awards ==
- 1988 Alexander von Humboldt fellowship of Germany: Research with Jürgen Martens at the University of Oldenburg and Hans Brückner University of Giessen.
- 1992 European Economic Community Fellowship: Research with Peter Shewry University of Bristol
- 1993 Fellow of the Royal Society of Chemistry
- 2001 Fellow of the National Academy of Sciences India
