= Prem Kumar Bhatia =

Indian mathematician

Prem Kumar Bhatia FRAS, FNASc, FIMA, MIAU
- Born: 4 November 1937 (age 88); Kanpur India
- Other names: Prem Bhatia, P K Bhatia
- Citizenship: India
- Education: University of Delhi, Jai Narain Vyas University
- Occupation: Emeritus Professor
- Years active: 1963-2020
- Employer: Jai Narain Vyas University
- Known for: Mathematics, Astrophysics
- Spouse: Saroj Bhatia
- Children: 1
- Relatives: Rachna Bhatia Vijan (daughter)
- Awards: Distinguished Service Award
- Honours: FRAS, FNASc, FIMA, MIAU

Prem Kumar Bhatia FNASc, FRAS, MIAU, FIMA (UK) was an Indian mathematician and astrophysicist. He worked as Emeritus Professor in Jai Narain Vyas University until his death in his permanent residence at Jodhpur.

== Early life ==
Prof Bhatia was born in middle class Punjabi Khatri family Bhatia caste (on 7 September 1937) in Kanpur City. He did his early study in Kanpur, thereafter came to Delhi where he did his B.Sc Gold medal and M.Sc Gold medal. Bhatia did his PhD from Jai Narain Vyas University in 1964 and did his post-doctoral work at Monash University, University of Liège, University of Lagos then completed his DSc from Jai Narain Vyas University in 1974.

== Career ==
He also worked as associate professor in 1974 in Jai Narain Vyas University. In 1983 he was Professor, Head of department of Mathematics and Statistics and also Dean of Science faculty of Jai Narain Vyas University. Prof Bhatia retired in 2002, and from there on he worked as Emeritus Professor in M.B.M. Engineering College till his last breath.

== Awards and honours ==
Prof Bhatia was conferred upon with a distinguished service award from Vigyan Parishad of India

- Fellow of National Academy of Sciences, India
- Fellow of International Mathematical Association (UK)
- Fellow of Royal Astronomical Society
- Member of International Astronomical Union.

== Publications ==
Bhatia published more than 200 articles in international and national level peer review journals.
