= List of urban local bodies in Rajasthan =

Rajasthan has 10 Municipal Corporations, 47 Municipal Councils and approximately 252 Municipal Boards or Nagar Pachayats as per ULB election 2026. Thus Rajasthan has a total 309 Municipalities or Urban Local Bodies(ULBs). The Rajasthan Municipalities Act, 2009 governs the administration of all the urban local bodies in the state. The Department of Local Self Government of the Rajasthan Government monitors the administration of all the municipalities in the state.

Official site https://lsg.urban.rajasthan.gov.in/content/raj/udh/lsg-jaipur/en/about-us/LocalBodies.html

== List of municipal corporations ==
List of municipal corporations or Nagar Nigams of Rajasthan. Jaipur, Jodhpur, and Kota had two municipal corporations each between October 2019 and October 2024. As of August 2024, there are 10 Municipal Corporations in Rajasthan for ten cities.

S.No.	Name	URL
1	Ajmer Municipal Corporation	https://ajmermc.org
2	Alwar Municipal Corporation	
3	Bharatpur Municipal Corporation	https://www.bharatpurmc.co.in
4	Bhilwara Municipal Corporation	
5	Bikaner Municipal Corporation	https://bikanermc.org
6	Jaipur Municipal Corporation	https://jaipurmc.org http://jaipurmcheritage.org
7	Jodhpur Municipal Corporation	https://urban.rajasthan.gov.in/mcjs
8	Kota Municipal Corporation	
9	Pali Municipal Corporation	
10	Udaipur Municipal Corporation	https://www.udaipurmc.org

== List of municipal councils ==
As per the 2011 Census, there were 34 municipal councils. Later, Udaipur and Bharatpur were upgraded to Municipal Corporations. In the 2026 election, the list has reached 47 municipal councils in 47 cities.

Municipal Councils of Rajasthan
S/N	City	District
1	Kishangarh	Ajmer
2	Pushkar	Ajmer
3	Balotra	Balotra
4	Banswara	Banswara
5	Baran	Baran
6	Barmer	Barmer
7	Beawar	Beawar
8	Bundi	Bundi
9	Chittorgarh	Chittorgarh
10	Nimbahera	Chittorgarh
11	Churu	Churu
12	Sardarshahar	Churu
13	Sujangarh	Churu
14	Dausa	Dausa
15	Lalsot	Dausa
16	Didwana	Didwana-Kuchaman
17	Kuchaman City	Didwana-Kuchaman
18	Makrana	Didwana-Kuchaman
19	Deeg	Deeg
20	Dholpur	Dholpur
21	Dungarpur	Dungarpur
22	Ganganagar	Sri Ganganagar
23	Hanumangarh	Hanumangarh
24	Chomu	Jaipur
25	Shahpura	Jaipur
26	Jaisalmer	Jaisalmer
27	Jalore	Jalore
28	Jhalawar	Jhalawar
29	Jhunjhunu	Jhunjhunu
30	Hindaun	Karauli
31	Karauli	Karauli
32	Bhiwadi	Khairthal-Tijara
33	Khairthal	Khairthal-Tijara
34	Tijara	Khairthal-Tijara
35	Behror	Kotputli-Behror
36	Kotputli	Kotputli-Behror
37	Nagaur	Nagaur
38	Phalodi	Phalodi
39	Pratapgarh	Pratapgarh
40	Rajsamand	Rajsamand
41	Gangapur City	Sawai Madhopur
42	Sawai Madhopur	Sawai Madhopur
43	Salumbar	Salumbar
44	Fatehpur	Sikar
45	Sikar	Sikar
46	Sirohi	Sirohi
47	Tonk	Tonk

== List of municipal boards ==
Municipalities as per election 2026 (2011 Census) Rajasthan (total 252)

District Ajmer
1	Pushkar	Ajmer
2	Sarwar	Sarwar
3	Vijainagar	Masuda
4	Nasirabad	Nasirabad
5	Contonment Council Nasirabad	Nasirabad
6	Sawar	Kekri

District - Alwar

S.N.	Town	Tehsil
1	Behror	Behror
2	Thanagazi	Thanagazi
3	Khairthal	Kotkasim
4	Kherli	Kathumar
5	Rajgarh	Rajgarh
6	Tijara	Tijara
7	Bansur	Bansur
8	Ramgarh	Ramgarh
9	Laxmangarh	Laxmangarh
10	Govindgarh	Govindgarh
11	Malakhera	Malakhera
12	Kathumar	Kathumar
13	Mundawar	Mundawar
14	Kotkasim	Kotkasim
15	Bardod	Behror
16	Neemrana	Neemrana
17	Tapukada	Neemrana
18	Baroda Meo	Ramgarh
19	Bahadurpur	Bahadurpur
20	Reni	Reni
21	Naugawa	Naugawa
22	Mubarikpur	Naugawa

District - Baran

S.N.	Town	Tehsil
1	Antah	Antah
2	Baran	Baran
3	Chhabra	Chhabra
4	Mangrol	Mangrol

District - Barmer

S.N.	Town	Tehsil
1	Chohtan	Chohtan

District - Bharatpur

S.N.	Town	Tehsil
1	Bayana	Bayana
2	Bhusawar	Weir
3	Deeg	Deeg
4	Kaman	Kaman
5	Kumher	Kumher
6	Nagar	Nagar
7	Nadbai	Nadbai
8	Weir	Weir
9	Uchain	Uchain
10	Sikari	Sikari
11	Roopwas	Roopwas

District - Bikaner

S.N.	Town	Tehsil
1	Deshnoke	Bikaner
2	Dungargarh	Dungargarh
3	Nokha	Nokha
4	Lunkaransar	Lunkaransar
5	Napasar	Napasar
6	Khajuwala	Khajuwala

District - Banswara

S.N.	Town	Tehsil
1	Banswara	Banswara
2	Kushalgarh	Kushalgarh
3	Partapur-Garhi	garhi

District - Bhilwara

S.N.	Town	Tehsil
1	Asind	Asind
2	Gulabpura	Hurda
3	Jahazpur	Jahazpur
4	Mandalgarh	Mandalgarh
5	Sahara	Gangapur
6	Shahpura	Shahpura

District - Bundi

S.N	Town	Tehsil
1	Bundi	Bundi
2	Indragarh	Indragarh
3	Kaprain	Keshoraipatan
4	Keshoraipatan	Keshoraipatan
5	Lakheri	Indragarh
6	Nainwa	Nainwa

District - Chittaurgarh

S.N	Town	Tehsil
1	Bari Sadri	Bari Sadri
2	Begun	Begun
3	Chittaurgarh	Chittaurgarh
4	Kapasan	Kapasan
5	Nimbahera	Nimbahera
6	Rawatbhata	Rawatbhata

District - Churu

S.N.	Town	Tehsil
1	Bidasar	Bidasar
2	Chhapar	Sujangarh
3	Rajaldesar	Ratangarh
4	Rajgarh	Rajgarh
5	Ratangarh	Ratangarh
6	Ratannagar	Churu
7	Taranagar	Taranagar

District - Dausa

S.N.	Town	Tehsil
1	Bandikui	Bandikui
2	Dausa	Dausa
3	Lalsot	Lalsot
4	Mahuwa	Mahuwa
5	Mandawar	Mandawar
6	Mandawari	Lalsot
7	Bhandarej	Dausa
8	Lawan	Lawan
9	Sikrai	Sikrai
10	Baswa	Baswa
11	Ramgarh Pachwara	Ramgarh Pachwara

District - Dhaulpur

S.N.	Town	Tehsil
1	Bari	Bari
2	Dhaulpur	Dhaulpur
3	Rajakhera	Rajakhera

District - Dungarpur

S.N.	Town	Tehsil
1	Dungarpur	Dungarpur
2	Sagwara	Sagwara

District - Ganganagar

S.N.	Town	Tehsil
1	Anupgarh	Anupgarh
2	Gajsinghpur	Padampur
3	Karanpur	Karanpur
4	Kesrisinghpur	Karanpur
5	Padampur	Padampur
6	Raisinghnagar	Raisinghnagar
7	Sadulshahar	Sadulshahar
8	Suratgarh	Suratgarh
9	Vijainagar	Vijainagar
10	Gharsana	Gharsana

District - Hanumangarh

S.N.	Town	Tehsil
1	Bhadra	Bhadra
2	Nohar	Nohar
3	Pilibanga	Pilibanga
4	Rawatsar	Rawatsar
5	Sangaria	Sangaria
6	Tibbi	Tibbi
7	Goluwala	Pilibanga

District - Jaipur

S.N.	Town	Tehsil
1	Bagru	Sanganer
2	Chaksu	Chaksu
3	Chomu	Chomu
4	Jobner	Phulera (Hq.Sambhar)
5	Kishangarh Renwal	Phulera (Hq.Sambhar)
6	Kotputli	Kotputli
7	Phulera	Phulera (Hq.Sambhar)
8	Sambhar	Phulera (Hq.Sambhar)
9	Shahpura	Shahpura
10	Viratnagar	Viratnagar
11	Paota	Paota
12	Bassi	Bassi
13	Bagru	Bagru
14	Naraina	Dudu
15	Manoharpur	Shahpura
16	Phagi	Phagi
17	Vatika	Sanganer
18	Dudu	Dudu

District - Jaisalmer

S.N.	Town	Tehsil
1	Pokaran	Pokaran

District - Jalor

S.N.	Town	Tehsil
1	Bhinmal	Bhinmal
2	Ahore	Ahore
3	Sanchore	Sanchore
4	Sayla	Sayla

District - Jhalawar

S.N.	Town	Tehsil
1	Aklera	Aklera
2	Bhawani Mandi	Pachpahar
3	Jhalawar	Jhalrapatan
4	Jhalrapatan	Jhalrapatan
5	Pirawa	Pirawa
6	Dug	Dag
7	Khanpur	Khanpur
8	Manohar Thana	Manohar Thana

District - Jhunjhunun

S.N.	Town	Tehsil
1	Baggar	Jhunjhunun
2	Bissau	Jhunjhunun (now- Malsisar)
3	Chirawa	Chirawa
4	Khetri	Khetri
5	Mandawa	Jhunjhunun (now- Malsisar)
6	Mukandgarh	Nawalgarh
7	Nawalgarh	Nawalgarh
8	Pilani	Chirawa (now- Surajgarh)
9	Surajgarh	Chirawa (now- Surajgarh)
10	Udaipurwati	Udaipurwati
11	Singhana	Buhana
12	Vidyavihar	Chirawa (now- Surajgarh)

District - Jodhpur

S.N.	Town	Tehsil
1	Bilara	Bilara
2	Phalodi	Phalodi
3	Pipar City	Bilara
4	Bhopalgarh	Bhopalgarh

District - Karauli

S.N.	Town	Tehsil
1	Hindaun	Hindaun
2	Karauli	Karauli
3	Todabhim	Todabhim
4	Sapotra	Sapotra
5	Mandrail	Mandrail

District - Kota

S.N.	Town	Tehsil
1	Kaithoon	Ladpura
2	Ramganj Mandi	Ramganj Mandi
3	Sangod	Sangod

District - Nagaur

S.N.	Town	Tehsil
1	Didwana	Didwana
2	Kuchaman City	Nawa
3	Kuchera	Nagaur
4	Ladnu	Ladnu
5	Makrana	Makrana
6	Merta City	Merta
7	Mundawa	Nagaur
8	Nagaur	Nagaur
9	Nawa	Nawa
10	Parbatsar	Parbatsar
11	Degana	Degana

District - Pali

S.N.	Town	Tehsil
1	Bali	Bali
2	Falna	Bali
3	Jaitaran	Jaitaran
4	Rani	Desuri
5	Sadri	Desuri
6	Sojat	Sojat
7	Sumerpur	Sumerpur
8	Takhatgarh	Sumerpur

District - Pratapgarh

S.N.	Town	Tehsil
1	Chhoti Sadri	Chhoti Sadri
2	Pratapgarh	Pratapgarh

District - Rajsamand

S.N.	Town	Tehsil
1	Amet	Amet
2	Deogarh	Deogarh
3	Nathdwara	Nathdwara
4	Rajsamand	Rajsamand

District - Sawai Madhopur

S.N.	Town	Tehsil
1	Gangapur City	Gangapur
2	Bamanwas	Bamanwas
3	Bonli	Bonli

District - Sikar

S.N.	Town	Tehsil
1	Fatehpur	Fatehpur
2	Khandela	Sri Madhopur
3	Lachhmangarh	Lachhmangarh
4	Losal	Danta Ramgarh
5	Neem-Ka-Thana	Neem-Ka-Thana
6	Ramgarh	Fatehpur
7	Reengus	Sri Madhopur
8	Sri Madhopur	Sri Madhopur
9	Khatushyam ji	Khatushyam ji

District - Sirohi

S.N.	Town	Tehsil
1	Abu Road	Abu Road
2	Mount Abu	Abu Road
3	Sheoganj	Sheoganj
4	Pindwara	Pindwara
5	Jawal	Sirohi

District - Tonk

S.N.	Town	Tehsil
1	Deoli	Deoli
2	Malpura	Malpura
3	Niwai	Niwai
4	Todaraisingh	Todaraisingh
5	Uniara	Uniara

District - Udaipur

S.N.	Town	Tehsil
1	Bhinder	Vallabhnagar
2	Fatehnagar	Mavli
3	Kanor	Vallabhnagar
4	Salumbar	Salumbar

District - Balotra

S.N.	Town	Tehsil
1	Balotra	

== See also ==
- Government of Rajasthan
- Politics of Rajasthan
