= Bureau of Investment Promotion, Rajasthan =

This agency established in 1991

Bureau of Investment Promotion (abbreviated as B.I.P Rajasthan) is the in-charge agency for investment promotion and single-window clearances in the Rajasthan state of India. The main objective of the B.I.P is to promote investment in the state by supporting the investors. It is a bureau under the Government of Rajasthan.

== Administration ==
The Bureau is headed by an officer of the Indian Administrative Service, who is the Commissioner and handles the overall supervision of the activities of the bureau. The present Commissioner is Dr. Samit Sharma (IAS).
