= Rajasthan Board of Secondary Education =

School education board in India

Board of Secondary Education, Rajasthan
- Seal of Board of Secondary Education Rajasthan
- Abbreviation: RBSE
- Formation: 4 December 1957; 68 years ago
- Type: Governmental Board of Education
- Legal status: Active
- Headquarters: Ajmer, Rajasthan, India
- Official language: Hindi & English
- Chairman
- Administrator: Laxmi Narayan Mantri IAS
- Parent organisation: Government of Rajasthan
- Affiliations: 31,246
- Website: rajeduboard.rajasthan.gov.in

The Board of Secondary Education, Rajasthan (RBSE) is a State Level board of education in the Indian state Rajasthan, for public and private schools, controlled and managed by the Government of Rajasthan.The Board is recognised Nationally. RBSE is responsible for promotion and development of secondary education in Rajasthan state. It was Established in the year 1957 and constituted under the Rajasthan Secondary Education Act 1957.All schools affiliated to RBSE follow the NCERT curriculum especially from class 6 to 12. The current Chairperson of RBSE is Laxmi Narayan Mantri (IAS).

== Examinations ==
RBSE conducts the final examinations for Class 5, Class 8, Class 10 and Class 12 every year in the month of March/April. The results are announced by the end of June. Results of examinations conducted by RBSE can be accessed via website.

== Languages ==
RBSE offers academic subjects in regional languages were English and Hindi are compulsory.

== Promotion criteria ==
=== Class 10 ===
For promotion from Secondary level (Class IX-X) to Senior Secondary level (Class XI-XII), a student must obtain, for all subjects (or best five of six subjects are taken), 33% overall, without any minimum theory mark requirement. Originally, the passing criteria were set such that a student had to get 33% in both the theory and practical components. Students who do not manage to pass up to two subjects can write the compartment in those subjects in September. Those who fail the compartment, or fail in three subjects or more, must rewrite all the subjects taken in the next year.

=== Class 12 ===
For class 12 students the promotion criteria are 33% overall, with 33% in both theory and practical examinations (if applicable). Students who do not manage to pass in exactly one subject can write the compartment for that subject in September. Those who fail the compartment, or those who fail in two subjects or more, must rewrite all the subjects taken in the next year.

== Affiliations ==
RBSE affiliates are

- Mahatma Gandhi ( English Medium) Govt Schools: 14,541
- Private Schools: 15,647
- Model Schools: 339
- Adarsh Schools: 247
- Other Schools: 345

== See also ==
- Council for the Indian School Certificate Examinations (CISCE)
- National Institute of Open Schooling (NIOS)
- Secondary School Leaving Certificate (SSLC)
- National Eligibility cum Entrance Test (Undergraduate)
- Joint Entrance Examination – Main
