= Rajasthan Police Service =

Indian state police service

Rajasthan Police Service Rājasthāna Pulisa Sevā
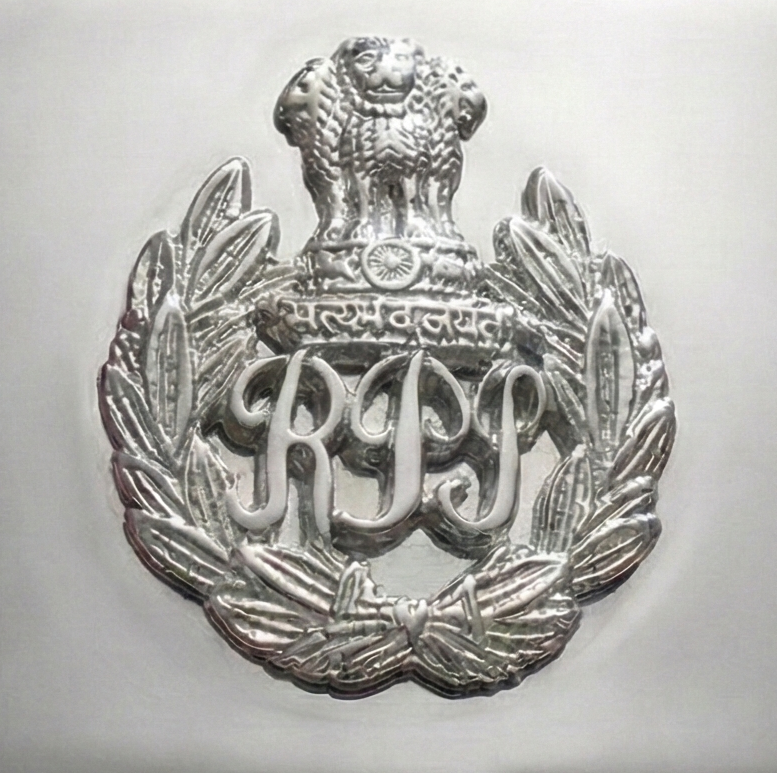

Service Overview
- Also known as: R.P.S.
- Founded: 1951
- State: Rajasthan
- Staff College: Rajasthan Police Academy, Jaipur, Rajasthan
- Cadre Controlling Authority: Department of Home, Government of Rajasthan
- Minister Responsible: Bhajan Lal Sharma, Chief Minister of Rajasthan and Minister of Home
- Legal personality: Governmental; Civil service
- Cadre Strength: 997 members
- Selection: Rajasthan State and Subordinate Combined Services Competitive Examination
- Association: RPS Association

Head of the State Civil Services
- Chief Secretary: V. Srinivas, IAS

The Rajasthan Police Service (RPS) is the state police service of Rajasthan, India. Established in 1951, it is classified as a Group A State Civil Service. The functioning of the service is regulated by the Rajasthan Police Service Rules, 1954, which lay down provisions relating to recruitment, training, and service conditions of its officers.

RPS officers are appointed to supervisory and command responsibilities across different administrative and territorial units of the state, where they perform duties related to policing, maintenance of public order, and crime control. The Department of Home, Government of Rajasthan, acts as the cadre-controlling authority for the service. Together with the Rajasthan Administrative Service and the Rajasthan Forest Service, the Rajasthan Police Service constitutes one of the principal feeder cadres for appointments to the All India Services.

== Career progression ==
After completing their professional training, RPS officers are usually appointed as Deputy Superintendent of Police (Dy. SP). In this capacity, they are commonly posted as Circle Officers, where a police circle typically comprises several police stations. With experience and seniority, officers are promoted to the rank of Additional Superintendent of Police (Addl. SP).

=== Functional Designations vs. Substantive Rank ===
The substantive rank or permanent rank of Junior Rajasthan Police Service (RPS) officers is Deputy Superintendent of Police (DySP). Their designation varies based on their posting: when appointed to supervise a police circle comprising multiple police stations at the district or sub-division level, they are designated as Circle Officers (CO). In Police Commissionerates (Jaipur or Jodhpur), they are known as Assistant Commissioners of Police (ACP). When posted to Rajasthan Armed Constabulary (RAC) battalions, they serve as Assistant Commandants. However, when posted to specialized units such as the Anti-Corruption Bureau (ACB), SOG, CID (CB), or CID (IB), they retain the title of Deputy Superintendent of Police.

The substantive rank of Senior RPS officers is Additional Superintendent of Police (Addl. SP). When posted to a Police Commissionerate (Jaipur or Jodhpur), they are designated as Additional Deputy Commissioners of Police (ADCP). However, when posted to Rajasthan Armed Constabulary (RAC) battalions, they serve as Deputy Commandants or Commandants.

Transfer and Posting Authority
Rank	Designation	Transfer/Posting Authority
Junior Scale	Deputy Superintendent of Police (DySP)	Director General of Police (DGP) (Police Headquarters, Jaipur)
Senior Scale & Above	Additional Superintendent of Police (Addl. SP)	Department of Home (Government of Rajasthan, Secretariat)

== Rank structure ==
Rank insignia of Rajasthan Police Service
Rank	Insignia description	Image
Deputy Superintendent of Police (DySP)	Three stars with R.P.S. badge	
Additional Superintendent of Police (Addl. SP)	National Emblem with R.P.S. badge	
