= Rajasthan Police Academy =

Police academy in Jaipur, India

- Abbreviation: RPA
- Formation: August 1975
- Type: Government agency
- Legal status: Active
- Headquarters: Nehru Nagar, Jaipur (Rajasthan), India
- Location: Nehru Nagar, Jaipur (Rajasthan), India
- Region served: Rajasthan
- Members: Rajasthan Police Officers
- Director: Shri Rajiv sharma, IPS
- Parent organization: Government of Rajasthan
- Staff: 483
- Website: http://rpa.rajasthan.gov.in/

Rajasthan Police Academy (RPA), (Devanāgarī: राजस्थान पुलिस अकादमी) is the premier institute for the training of Rajasthan Police Service (RPS) officers and other Subordinate Police officers before they are given field postings to carry out their duties. The Academy is located in Jaipur, Rajasthan, India.

Rajasthan Police Academy is one of the top six police training institutions in the country as adjudged by the Bureau of Police Research and Development, Ministry of Home Affairs, Government of India.

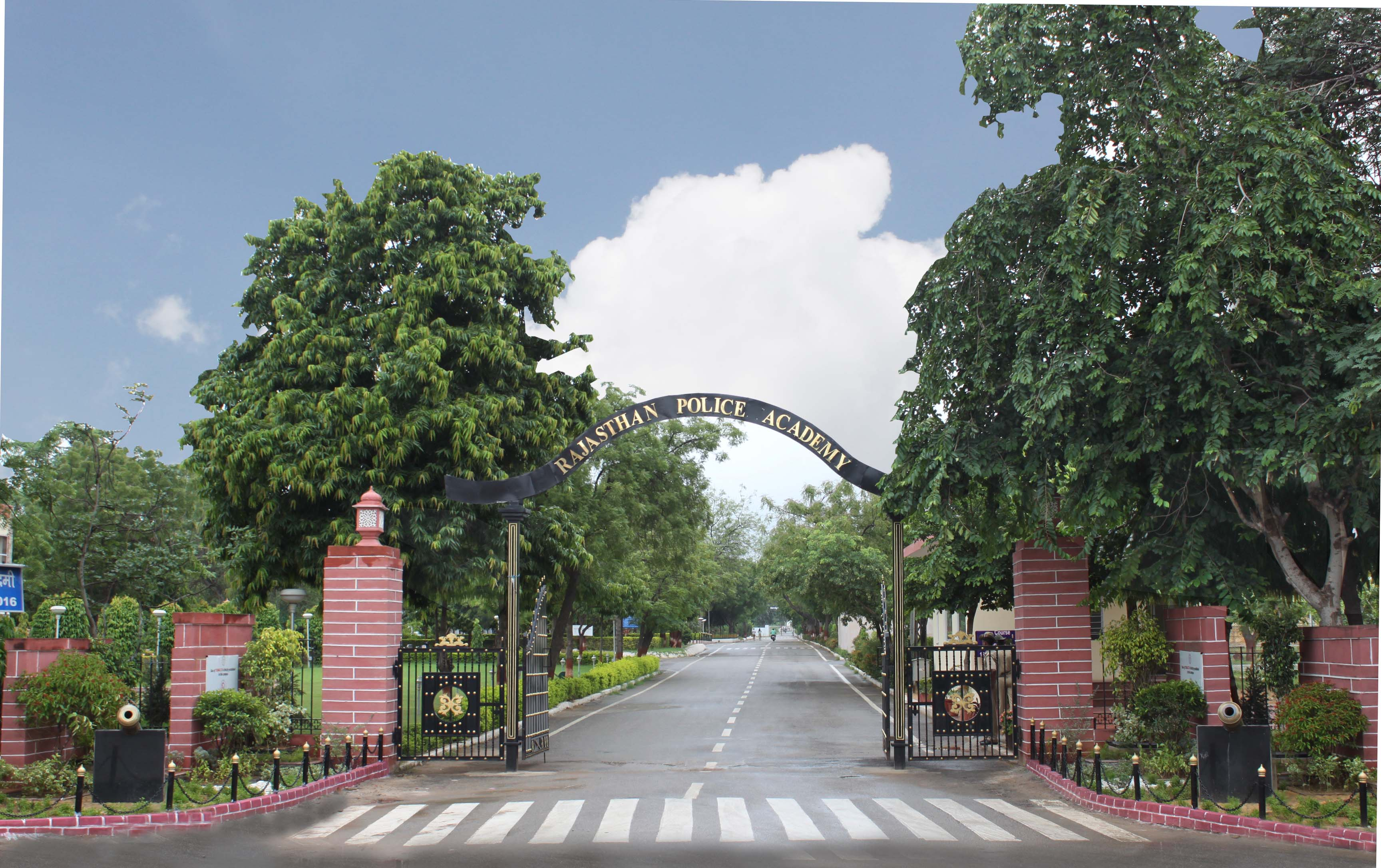
Rajasthan Police Academy

== Introduction ==
The first Police training institute of Rajasthan was established at the base of historic fort of Chittorgarh in the year 1950. It was shifted to Kishangarh and then to its present location i.e. Jaipur in the year 1975 and was upgraded as Rajasthan Police Academy. From the outset, the Academy's endeavour was to evolve as the best police training institution and accordingly it is shaping as a model Training Academy to train the police personnel and other stakeholders of the society.

The Academy is providing basic training to all the ranks from Constable to Deputy Superintendent of Police. The IPS officers, after completion of their training at NPA also undergo training at the Academy for three weeks on local laws and other related subjects. The Academy is engaged in organising Special Courses for the police personnel from Constable to ADGP level from Rajasthan and other States of the country. The Academy has also provided training to 300 Sri Lankan Police officers of Presidential Security Division and Constables of Chandigarh Police and is presently providing Band Training to the Band Constables of CISF. The Academy has conducted many Vertical Interaction Courses for IPS officers and was a venue for ATA courses for IPS officers conducted by the Department of State of the United States on varied topics.

== Organisation ==
The Academy is headed by an Additional Director General of Police rank officer as Director who is assisted by a Deputy Director of Superintendent of Police rank, five Assistant Directors of the rank of Additional Superintendent of Police and other subordinate ranks. Shri saurabh srivastav, IPS is the present Director of the Academy.

== Training ==
The number of trainings provided in Rajasthan Police Academy is one of the highest in the country. The Academy has a pool of faculty members on different topics. The criteria for continuance of faculty include the feedback of participants. The number of personnel trained in the Academy in last 5 years are given below:-

S.No	Year	Basic Courses	Promotion Cadre Courses	Special Courses	Total Number of Persons trained
1	2011-12	1483	0026	1502	3011
2	2012-13	1415	0087	1139	2641
3	2013-14	0442	0693	3679	4814
4	2014-15	0689	0317	1494	2500
5	2015-16	0496	1592	1501	3589
6	2016-17	0789	0959	2463	4211
7	2017-18	0648	0227	3460	4335
	Total	5962	3901	15238	25101

The role of faculty is not only confined to taking classes but they also to engage themselves in preparing training material. The Academy has prepared Sub Inspector Basic Course study material, Constable Recruits Guide in three volumes, Investigation Guide, Police Investigation, SOP on Police Constable Practical Work, Human Trafficking, POCSO provisions and Role of Police, Juvenile Justice System and Role of Police, Mahila and Bal Desk-Role and Responsibilities of Police, Check List of Investigation of Various Heinous Offences, Information Booklet on RTI etc. The CHRI and the Academy have jointly developed "Virtual Police Station" Project which is a training tool to be used by the Police and Public.

== Infrastructure and facilities ==
The prominent facilities are the main parade ground with red sand and the subsidiary parade ground, the air conditioned auditorium with a capacity of 450 persons, the swimming pool with the size of 25 X 13 meter, Multipurpose Hall with a capacity of 500 persons, a Gymnasium with all kind of modern equipments, well maintained Open Air Theatre with a capacity of 900 persons, the indoor firing range with simulator, the Kalpataru nursery etc. The Equestrian School and the Band School are fully functional in the Academy. The Academy has one Guest house, two hostels for the gazetted officers and 9 other hostels for subordinate ranks.

The Academy has a class room capacity of 1235 with five air conditioned conference halls of 295 capacities and a lecture theatre of a capacity of 140 persons. There are 16 class rooms in the Academy and each class can easily accommodate 50 trainees. The class rooms are equipped with LED Projector, CPU, sound systems, black/white boards with internet facility. The Academy has three cyber-labs with 110 computers and other accessories for training purpose. The Academy has investigation kits, drug detection kits, mock crime scenes and a mini lab for the training purpose. The faculty is well versed in using these facilities and mostly using power point presentation to deliver lectures in the class. The Academy has a library having more than 35,000 books and is subscribing to all major journals and important magazines.

== Prominent events ==
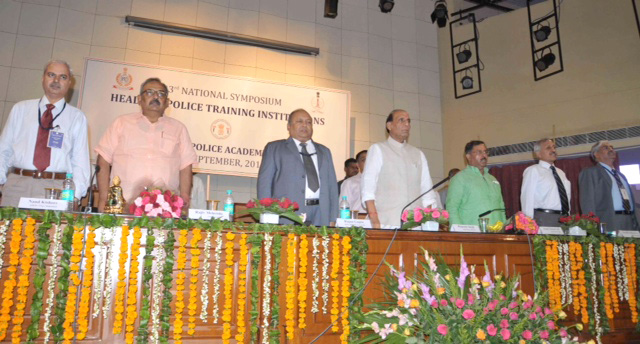
The Union Home Minister, Shri Rajnath Singh at the Valedictory Function of the 33rd National Symposium of Police Training Heads, at Police Training Academy, in Jaipur, Rajasthan on September 03, 2014

The Academy was chosen to be the host of 33rd National Symposium of Heads of Training Institutions in 2014 where all the training heads deliberated on improving the quality of police training. The Union Home Minister Shri Rajnath Singh graced the valedictory session.

The Academy was the host of All India Police Equestrian Meet in 2015 and also the host of All India Police Band Competition in 2016.

== See also ==
- Bureau of Police Research and Development
- National Crime Records Bureau
- Law enforcement in India
