= Lok Bhavan, Jaipur =

Lok Bhavan, Rajasthan
- Location within Jaipur

General information
- Type: Main residence
- Coordinates: 26.907675°N 75.785930°E
- Owner: Government of Rajasthan

References
- Website

Raj Bhavan (translation: Government House) is the official residence of the governor of Rajasthan. It is located in the capital city of Jaipur, Rajasthan. The present governor of Rajasthan is Haribhau Bagade.

== See also ==
- Government Houses of the British Indian Empire
