= Rajasthan Administrative Service =

State civil service of state Rajashtan

Rajasthan Administrative Service Rājasthāna Praśāsanika Sevā
Service Overview
- Also known as: R.A.S.
- Founded: 1950
- State: Rajasthan
- Staff College: HCM Rajasthan State Institute of Public Administration, Jaipur, Rajasthan
- Cadre Controlling Authority: Department of Personnel, Government of Rajasthan
- Minister Responsible: Bhajan Lal Sharma, Chief Minister of Rajasthan and Minister of Personnel
- Legal personality: Governmental; Civil service
- Cadre Strength: 1050 members (700 officers directly recruited by RPSC and 350 officers promoted from Tehsildars)
- Selection: Rajasthan State and Subordinate Combined Services Competitive Examination
- Association: RAS Association

Head of the State Civil Services
- Chief Secretary: T Ravikanth, IAS

Rajasthan Administrative Service, popularly known as RAS, is a state civil service of state Rajasthan along with Rajasthan Accounts Service, Rajasthan Police Service and other services. The officers are included in the state cadre of civil service officers. RAS officers undergo two years training at HCM Rajasthan State Institute of Public Administration. Cadre controlling authority for this service is Department of Personnel, Government of Rajasthan. The head of this service is Chief Secretary.

== Posts ==
RAS officers start service as assistant collector and executive magistrate in training period. After training they usually serve as Sub-Divisional Magistrate for some years. After that they are posted as additional district collector and additional district magistrate or additional Divisional Commissioner till their induction in Indian Administrative Service by promotion. Beside these posts they also hold various other posts like Deputy Secretary to Rajasthan Government, Joint Secretary to Rajasthan Government, Deputy Inspector General Stamp and Registration, Special Assistant to State Minister, Commissioner to Municipal Corporation, Additional Chief Executive Officer to Zila Parishad, chief executive officer to Zila Parishad, District Supply Officer, Secretary to Urban Improvement Trust, Registrar to State University, District Excise Officer, Member of Board of Revenue, Deputy and additional Commissioner to Colonisation and many other posts to different departments.

== Functions ==
State level and district level while delivering various government services apart from conducting revenue administration maintenance of law and order. They work at grass-root level of administration for policy implementation and policy formulation. They also work in secretariat at different posts.

== RAS Selection Process ==
The selection process for the RAS exam includes:

1. Preliminary Examination: Objective-type questions, primarily on General Awareness and General Science.
2. Main Examination: Descriptive papers on various subjects, including General Studies I-IV.
3. Interview (Personality Test): Final selection is based on performance in the mains and interview combined.
4. Document Verification: Ensures eligibility as per educational qualifications and category rules

== Promotion ==
The salary structure of the Rajasthan Administrative Service
Grade/level on pay matrix	Base Salary (per month)	Sanctioned Strength	Some Positions in the Government of Rajasthan Government	Years of service
RAS Higher Supertime scale	₹145800–214100	32	Additional Divisional Commissioner, Member of Board of Revenue, Director, Joint Secretary	26th year
RAS Supertime scale	₹123100–203500	178	Chief Executive Officer Zila Parishad, Additional Commissioner (in Municipal Corporations and Development Authorities), Regional Transport Officer, Deputy Inspector General (Stamps & Registration), Joint Secretary, Additional Director	19th year
RAS Selection grade	₹79900–199500	210	Additional Collector and Additional District Magistrate, District Transport Officer, District Supply Officer, District Excise Officer, Secretary Urban Improvement Trust, Deputy Secretary, Joint Director	11th year
RAS Senior scale	₹67300–195000	231	Sub Divisional Officer, Assistant Collector (Headquarters), Deputy Commissioner (in Municipal Corporations and Development Authorities), Deputy Director	6th year
RAS Junior scale	₹56100–177500	399	Sub Divisional Officer, Assistant Collector (Headquarters), Deputy Commissioner (in Municipal Corporations and Development Authorities), Assistant Director	Initial year

The cadres usually start from a designation lower in rank than Indian Administrative Service (IAS) (one of the All India Services). However, promoted RAS officers gradually can take posts equivalent to IAS officers. Usually it takes 25–30 years of service for promotion in IAS. Promotee IAS officers usually reach up to post of Secretary in Rajasthan Government before retirement. Promoted IAS officers are allotted a year of selection or batch on the basis of equivalent service of RAS to IAS.

== See also ==
- Indian Administrative Service
- Rajasthan Police Service
- Rajasthan Accounts Service
- Rajasthan Public Service Commission
- HCM Rajasthan State Institute of Public Administration
