= Rajasthan Public Service Commission =

State government agency

- RPSC राजस्थान लोक सेवा आयोग
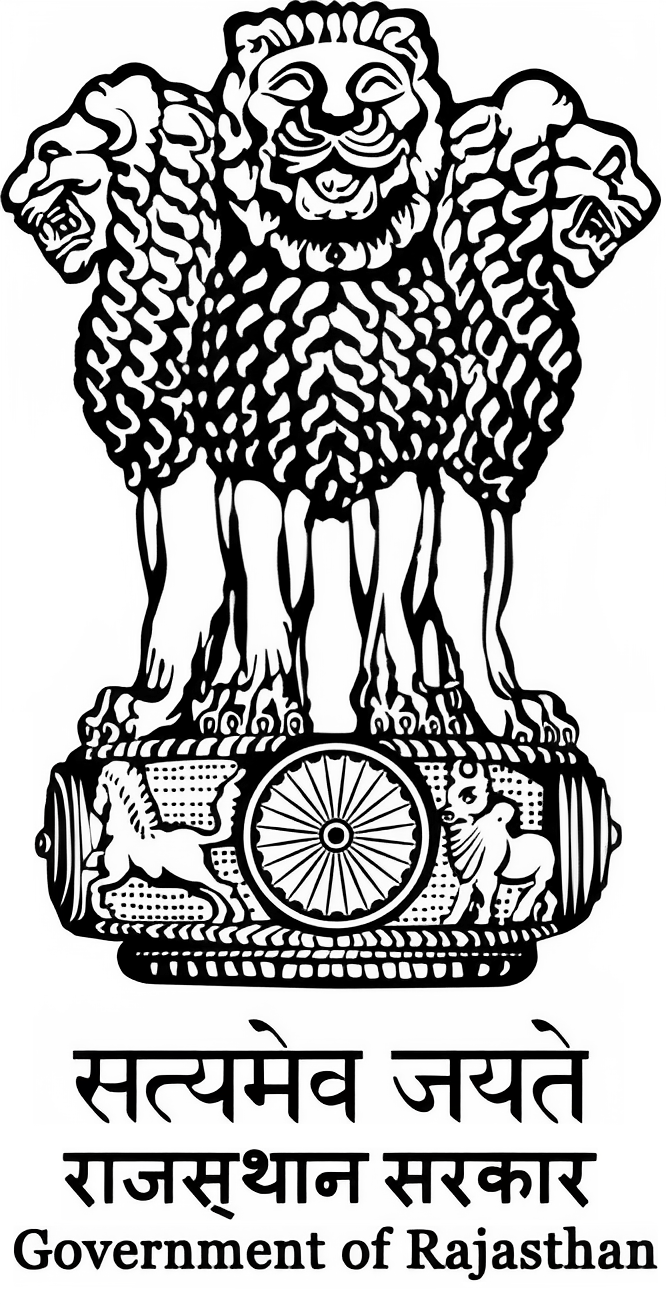

Constitutional body overview
- Formed: 22 December 1949
- Jurisdiction: Rajasthan
- Headquarters: Ghoogra Ghati, Ajmer
- Constitutional body executive: Lt. Col. Kesari Singh Rathore , Chairman
- Website: rpsc.rajasthan.gov.in

Rajasthan Public Service Commission (RPSC) is the constitutional body of the Government of Rajasthan. The commission was established on 22 December 1949 and headquartered in Ajmer. Constituted under Article 315 of the Indian Constitution, it is responsible for conducting recruitment to state civil services and other posts, as well as advising the government on service matters, rules, promotions, and disciplinary cases.

Its major examinations include the Rajasthan Administrative Service (RAS) and other state-level competitive tests. The commission is headed by chairman Utkal Ranjan Sahoo and members appointed by the Governor of Rajasthan under Article 316.

== History ==
The origins of the Rajasthan Public Service Commission (RPSC) trace back to the recommendations of the Lee Commission in 1923, which advocated for the establishment of a Central Public Service Commission in India. However, the Commission did not emphasize the creation of similar bodies at the provincial level, leaving it to individual provincial governments to manage recruitment and service regulations.

Before the unification of Rajasthan, Public Service Commissions existed only in three princely states—Jaipur, Jodhpur, and Bikaner. Following the political integration of the princely states, the Rajasthan Public Service Commission Ordinance, 1949 was promulgated and published in the Rajasthan Gazette on 20 August 1949. The ordinance came into effect with the official notification of 22 December 1949, marking the formal establishment of the RPSC.

Initially, the Commission comprised one chairman and two Members. Sarat Kumar Ghosh, then Chief Justice of Rajasthan, served as the first chairman, while Shri Devi, Shankar Tiwari and Shri N. R. Chandorkar were appointed Members. Later, Shri S. C. Tripathi (I.E.S), a former member of the Union Public Service Commission, also assumed the role of chairman.

To regulate the functioning of the commission, the Rajpramukh of Rajasthan issued two key regulations in 1951: the Rajasthan Public Service Commission (Conditions of Service) Regulation, 1951 and the Rajasthan Public Service Commission (Limitation of Functions) Regulation, 1951. Over time, additional frameworks were enacted, including the Rajasthan Public Service Commission Rules and Regulations, 1963 and the Rajasthan Public Service Commission (Regulations and Validation of Procedure) Ordinance, 1975, later replaced by the Act of 1976.

== Organisation ==
The sanctioned number of total members is eleven, including the chairman. However the current number of RPSC members is seven, while four seats are vacant.

- Utkal Ranjan Sahoo (chairman)
- Ram Niwas Mehta, IAS (secretary)
- Ashutosh Gupta, IAS (chief examination controller)
- Aiyub Khan (member)
- Sangeeta Arya (member)
- Col. Kesari Singh (member)
- Kailash Chand Meena (member)

== List of examinations conducted ==
This section includes list of examinations conducted by the RPSC

- Rajasthan Administrative Service (RAS) Examination
- Rajasthan Police Service (RPS) Examination
- Rajasthan Engineering Services (RES) Examination
- Rajasthan Technical Services Examination
- Rajasthan Subordinate Examination
- State Forest Services Examination
- College Lecturer Examination
- Assistant Professor Examination
- School Lecturer Examination
- Rajasthan Judicial Services Examination
- Sub-Inspector Examinations
- Veterinary & Fisheries Development Office Examination
- Asst. Statistical Officer
- Asst. Agriculture Officer
- Food Safety Officer

== List of Chairmen ==
This is a list of past chairmans of RPSC

| S.No. | Name | Tenure From | Tenure To |
|---|---|---|---|
| 1 | Sarat Kumar Ghosh, Chief Justice of Rajasthan | 01-04-1949 | 25–01–1950 |
| 2 | S. C. Tripathi | 28-07-1950 | 07–08–1951 |
| 3 | D. S. Tiwari | 08-08-1951 | 17–01–1958 |
| 4 | M. M. Varma | 18-01-1958 | 03–12–1958 |
| 5 | L. L. Joshi, IAS | 04-12-1958 | 31–07–1960 |
| 6 | V. V. Narlikar | 01-08-1960 | 31–07–1966 |
| 7 | B. L. Rawat, IAS | 01-08-1966 | 03–09–1966 |
| 8 | R. C. Choudhary, RHJS | 04-09-1966 | 08–10–1971 |
| 9 | B. D. Mathur | 09-10-1971 | 23–06–1973 |
| 10 | R. S. Kapur | 24-06-1973 | 10–06–1975 |
| 11 | Mohammed Yaqub, RHJS | 27-06-1975 | 30–06–1979 |
| 12 | Ram Singh Chouhan, IAS | 01-07-1979 | 10–09–1980 |
| 13 | Hari Dutt Gupta (Chief Engineer) | 11-09-1980 | 09–06–1983 |
| 14 | S. Adaviyappa (Chief Engineer) | 10-06-1983 | 26–03–1985 |
| 15 | Dr. Deen Dayal Chawan (Professor) | 27-03-1985 | 07–11–1985 |
| 16 | J. M. Khan, IAS | 08-11-1985 | 27–11–1989 |
| 17 | S. C. Singaria | 28-11-1989 | 04–09–1990 |
| 18 | Yatindra Singh, IAS | 05-09-1990 | 06–10–1995 |
| 19 | Hanuman Prasad, IAS | 06-10-1995 | 30–09–1997 |
| 20 | P. S. Yadav, IPS | 01-10-1997 | 06–11–1997 |
| 21 | Devendra Singh, IPS | 06-11-1997 | 30–12–2000 |
| 22 | N. K. Bairwa, IAS | 31-12-2000 | 22–03–2004 |
| 23 | S. S. Tak | 26-03-2004 | 15–07–2004 |
| 24 | Govind Singh Tauk (Retd. Chief Engineer) | 15-07-2004 | 04–07–2006 |
| 25 | H. N. Meena, IPS (Retd.) | 04-07-2006 | 19–09–2006 |
| 26 | C. R. Chaudhary | 20-09-2006 | 28–02–2010 |
| 27 | Mahendra Lal Kumawat, IPS (Retd.) | 28-02-2010 | 01–07–2011 |
| 28 | Prof. B. M. Sharma | 01-07-2011 | 31–08–2012 |
| 29 | Habib Khan Gauran, IPS (Retd.) | 31-08-2012 | 22–09–2014 |
| 30 | R. D. Saini | 24-09-2014 | 10–08–2015 |
| 31 | L. K. Panwar, IAS (Retd.) | 10-08-2015 | 10–07–2017 |
| 32 | Shyam Sunder Sharma | 11-07-2017 | 28–09–2017 |
| 33 | Radhe Shyam Garg | 18-12-2017 | 01–05–2018 |
| 34 | Deepak Upreti, IAS (Retd.) | 23-07-2018 | 14–10–2020 |
| 35 | Bhupendra Singh Yadav, IPS (Retd.) | 14-10-2020 | 01–12–2021 |
| 36 | Shiv Singh Rathore | 02-12-2021 | 29–01–2022 |
| 37 | Jaswant Singh Rathi | 01-02-2022 | 16–02–2022 |
| 38 | Sanjay Kumar Shrotriya, IPS (Retd.) | 16-02-2022 | 01–08–2024 |
| 39 | Kailash Chand Meena | 06-08-2024 | 11–06–2025 |
| 40 | Utkal Ranjan Sahoo, IPS | 12-06-2025 | Incumbent |

41 II Col. KESARI SINGH

== Controversies ==
Rajasthan Public Service Commission (RPSC) has faced multiple controversies in recent years, primarily centered around allegations of examination paper leaks, cheating scandals, administrative irregularities, and demands for institutional reform.

=== Paper leak scandals ===
In December 2022, the commission cancelled the 2nd grade teacher competitive examination for general knowledge after evidence confirmed a paper leak. Reports suggested the involvement of a paper leak mafia, with one instance involving a mastermind allegedly solving papers in a bus for a fee of ₹10 lakh. The RPSC permanently barred 46 candidates involved in the scandal from future examinations.

== See also ==
- Government of Rajasthan
- List of Public service commissions in India
