= Government of Rajasthan =

Indian State Government

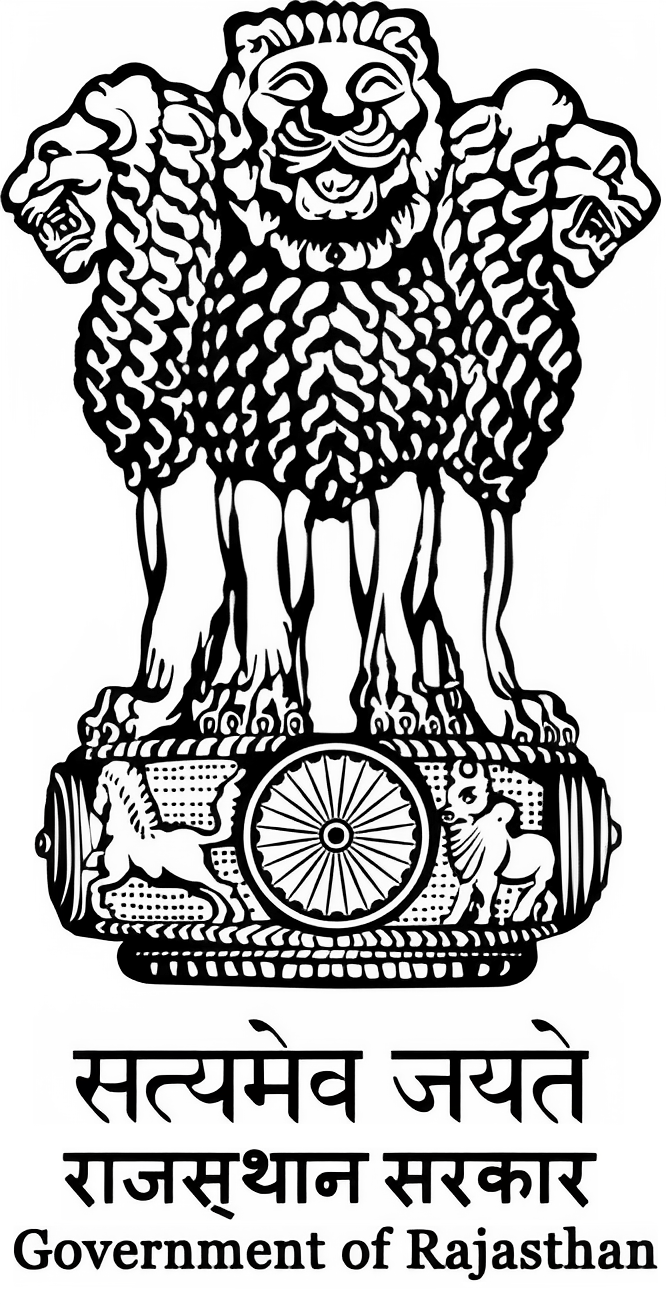
- Seat of Government: Jaipur
- Website: Government of Rajasthan

Legislative branch
- Assembly: Rajasthan Vidhan Sabha
- Speaker: Vasudev Devnani (BJP)
- Members in Assembly: 200

Executive branch
- Governor: Haribhau Kishanrao Bagade
- Chief Minister: Bhajan Lal Sharma (BJP)
- Deputy Chief Minister: Diya Kumari and Prem Chand Bairwa (BJP)
- Chief Secretary: Voruganti Srinivas, IAS

Judiciary
- High Court: Rajasthan High Court
- Chief Justice: Hon'ble Mr. Justice Sanjay Kumar Agrawal
- Seat: Jodhpur (Principal Bench), Jaipur (Permanent Bench)

The Government of Rajasthan is the supreme governing authority of the Indian state of Rajasthan and its 41 districts. It consists of an executive branch, led by the governor of Rajasthan, as well as judiciary and legislative branches. Jaipur is the capital of Rajasthan, and houses the Vidhan Sabha (legislative assembly) and the secretariat. There are various programs announced by the Government of Rajasthan.

== Government of Rajasthan ==
=== Executive ===
Like other states in India, the head of state of Rajasthan is the governor, appointed by the president of India on the advice of the central government. The post is largely ceremonial. The chief minister is the head of government and is vested with most of the executive powers.

In addition to its administrative setup, Rajasthan has a bicameral legislature comprising the Rajasthan Legislative Assembly (Vidhan Sabha), which consists of 200 members elected for five-year terms. Unlike some Indian states, Rajasthan does not have a Legislative Council. The Rajasthan High Court, located in Jodhpur, serves as the highest judicial authority in the state, with a bench also operating in Jaipur to ensure judicial access across regions. The administrative machinery is divided into 50 districts for effective governance.

Rajasthan is also unique for implementing innovative governance models like the Bhamashah Yojana, launched in 2014, aimed at financial inclusion and direct benefit transfer (DBT) to women-headed families, making it one of the first Indian states to digitize welfare distribution through biometric authentication.

==== Council of ministers ====
Portfolio	Minister	Took office	Left office	Party
Chief Minister; Home Affairs; Excise; Personnel; Anti Corruption Bureau; Planning; General Administration; Policy making cell Information and Public Relations; Other departments not allocated to any Minister	Bhajan Lal Sharma	15 December 2023	Incumbent	BJP
Deputy Chief Minister; Minister of Finance; Minister of Tourism; Minister of Women & Child Development; Minister of Art & Cultural Affairs; Minister of Public Works Department; Minister of Child Empowerment	Diya Kumari	15 December 2023	Incumbent	BJP
Deputy Chief Minister; Minister of Higher Education; Minister of Road Transport and Highways; Minister of Technical Education; Minister of Ayurveda, Yoga and Naturopathy	Prem Chand Bairwa	15 December 2023	Incumbent	BJP
Minister of Medical and Health; Minister of Medical and Health Services	Gajendra Singh Khimsar	30 December 2023	Incumbent	BJP
Minister of Industry and Commerce; Minister of Information Technology and Communication; Minister of Youth Affairs and Sports; Minister of Skill Planning and Entrepreneurship; Minister of Sainik Welfare	Rajyavardhan Singh Rathore	30 December 2023	Incumbent	BJP
Minister of Tribal Area Development; Minister of Home Guards Department	Babulal Kharadi	30 December 2023	Incumbent	BJP
Minister of Parliamentary Affairs; Minister of Law and Legal Affairs; Minister of Justice	Jogaram Patel	30 December 2023	Incumbent	BJP
Minister of Water Resources; Minister of Water Resources Planning	Suresh Singh Rawat	30 December 2023	Incumbent	BJP
Minister of School Education; Minister of Panchayati Raj; Minister of Sanskrit Education	Madan Dilawar	30 December 2023	Incumbent	BJP
Minister of Social Justice and Empowerment	Avinash Gehlot	30 December 2023	Incumbent	BJP
Minister of Animal Husbandry and Dairy; Minister of Cow Husbandry; Minister of Devasthan	Joraram Kumawat	30 December 2023	Incumbent	BJP
Minister of Revenue; Minister of Colonization	Hemant Meena	30 December 2023	Incumbent	BJP
Minister of Food and Civil Supplies; Minister of Consumer Affairs	Sumit Godara	30 December 2023	Incumbent	BJP
Minister of Public Health Engineering; Minister of Ground Water	Kanhaiya Lal Choudhary	30 December 2023	Incumbent	BJP

=== Legislature ===
The legislature (Vidhan Mandal) of Rajasthan is unicameral, consisting of legislative assembly, which consists of 200 M.L.A. The assembly sits for terms of a maximum of 5 years.

=== Judiciary ===
The Rajasthan High Court is having its principal seat in Jodhpur, and a bench at Jaipur which have respective jurisdiction over the neighboring districts of Rajasthan.

== Head leaders ==
House	Leader	Portrait	Since
Constitutional posts
Governor of Rajasthan	Haribhau Kishanrao Bagade		27 July 2024
Chief Minister of Rajasthan	Bhajan Lal Sharma		12 December 2023
Speaker of the House, Rajasthan Legislative Assembly	Vasudev Devnani		12 December 2023
Leader of the House Rajasthan Legislative Assembly	Bhajan Lal Sharma		12 December 2023
Leader of the Opposition Rajasthan Legislative Assembly	Tika Ram Jully		19 January 2024
Deputy Leader of the Opposition Rajasthan Legislative Assembly	Ramkesh Meena		2 December 2023
Chief Justice of Rajasthan High Court	Manindra Mohan Shrivastava (acting)		9 November 2023
Chief Secretary of Rajasthan	V. Srinivas, IAS		31 December 2023

== Local governments ==
=== District-wise Urban Local Bodies in Rajasthan ===
District	Municipal Corporations	Municipal Councils	Municipalities	Total ULBs
Ajmer	1	4	4	9
Alwar	2	5	10	17
Banswara	0	2	5	7
Baran	0	2	5	7
Barmer	0	2	7	9
Bharatpur	1	3	6	10
Bhilwara	1	3	6	10
Bikaner	1	3	3	7
Bundi	0	2	5	7
Chittorgarh	0	2	5	7
Churu	0	2	6	8
Dausa	0	2	5	7
Dholpur	0	2	4	6
Dungarpur	0	1	1	2
Hanumangarh	0	2	5	7
Jaipur	2	5	6	13
Jaisalmer	0	1	4	5
Jalore	0	2	5	7
Jhalawar	0	2	4	6
Jhunjhunu	0	3	6	9
Jodhpur	1	3	4	8
Karauli	0	2	5	7
Kota	1	2	3	6
Nagaur	0	3	5	8
Pali	0	3	5	8
Pratapgarh	0	1	3	4
Rajsamand	0	2	4	6
Sawai Madhopur	0	2	3	5
Sikar	0	3	6	9
Sirohi	0	2	4	6
Sri Ganganagar	0	2	6	8
Tonk	0	2	5	7
Udaipur	1	3	6	10

Rajasthan's urban administration is organized into Urban Local Bodies (ULBs), which include Municipal Corporations, Municipal Councils, and Municipalities. The state has 33 districts, each containing one or more ULBs depending on its population and urbanization level. The largest cities, such as Jaipur and Jodhpur, have Municipal Corporations, while smaller towns are administered by Municipal Councils or Municipalities. The table below provides a district-wise breakdown of all ULBs in Rajasthan.

== See also ==
- Rajasthan
- Outline of Rajasthan
- Raj Bhavan, Jaipur
- Rajasthan Police
- Bhajan Lal Sharma ministry
- Politics of Rajasthan
- Elections in Rajasthan
- Rajasthan High Court
- List of tehsils of Rajasthan
- Rajasthan Legislative Assembly
- List of districts of Rajasthan
- List of governors of Rajasthan
- List of chief ministers of Rajasthan
- List of deputy chief ministers of Rajasthan
- Rajasthan Administrative Service
- Bureau of Investment Promotion
- List of urban local bodies in Rajasthan
- Rajasthan Board of Secondary Education
- Rajasthan Public Service Commission
- Rajasthan State Election Commission
- List of institutions of higher education in Rajasthan
