= Vishal (name) =

Male given name

- Pronunciation: /vɪʃɑːl/
- Gender: Male
- Language: Tamil, Hindi, Marathi, Telugu and Gujarati.

Origin
- Meaning: great, grandeur, unstoppable
- Region of origin: India

Other names
- Alternative spelling: Vishaal, Vishaul, Visal
- Nicknames: Numerous, depending on context: for example, Vishu, Veesh, Vish, Vichu.

Vishal (विशाल) is a name for males. Vishal means great, grandeur, magnificence, prominence, and eminence. The meaning is also attributive to the property of being grand.

== Etymology ==
The word Vishal finds its origins in the ancient language of Sanskrit. Vishal is also a common adjective found in North and South Indian languages such as Hindi, Tamil, Marathi, Telugu and Gujarati.

== Religious significance ==
=== Supreme consciousness ===
Vishalta (Hindi & Sanskrit: विशालता) comes from the word Vishal and is a state of mind that is often embraced by different religious and spiritual leaders in India. The word embodies the ultimate state of selflessness, or belief that the body, mind, and all worldly possessions belong to God. One in a state of Vishaltha believes that the body is only a tool for carrying out the wishes of the Lord.

=== Buddhism ===
It has been suggested that one of Buddha's favorite resorts, Vaishali, was named after King Vishal, a ruler during the times of Ramayana. There exists several ancient buddhist monuments as well as a large, but ruined fort, which is believed to be built by King Vishal.

== Related names ==
- Vaishali (Hindi & Sanskrit: वैशाली)

Yash (Hindi & Sanskrit: यश) - somewhat similar meaning to Vishal but not exactly

== People with the name ==
=== Industrialists and business professionals ===
- Vishal Gondal (born 1976), Indian entrepreneur
- Vishal Sikka, Indian CEO and MD of Infosys

=== Movies, TV and entertainment ===
- Vishal (actor) (born 1977), Indian film actor
- Vishal Bhardwaj (born 1965), Indian music composer
- Vishal Dadlani, Indian music composer of Vishal–Shekhar
- Vishal Veeru Devgan, better known as Ajay Devgn, Indian movie actor
- Vishal Karwal (born 1984), Indian actor
- Vishal Mahadkar (born 1978), Indian film director
- Vishal Malhotra (born 1981), Indian actor and presenter
- Vishal Singh (TV actor) (born 1974), television actor from India
- Vishal Sinha, Indian cinematographer
- Vishnu Vishal (born 1987), Indian actor and producer

=== Sports ===
- Vishal Bharat (born 1978), British Virgin Islands cricketer
- Vishal Dabholkar (born 1987), Indian cricketer
- Vishal Joshi (born 1989), Indian cricketer
- Vishal Kumar (born 1992), Indian footballer
- Vishal Marwaha (born 1976), Scottish field hockey player
- Vishal Singh (polo player), Indian polo player
- Vishal Tripathi (born 1988), English cricketer
- Soeuy Visal, Cambodian footballer

=== Others ===
- Vishal Arora, journalist, writer, photojournalist, and videographer
- Vishal Dadlani (born 1977), Indian singer
- Vishal Garg (born 1973), Indian academic
- Vishal Mangalwadi (born 1949), Indian author
- Vishal Mishra (composer), Indian music composer and singer
- Vishal Sareen (born 1973), Indian chess player

== See also ==
- Vishal (disambiguation)
