= Princess Diya Kumari Foundation =

Non-profit organization in the India

- Abbreviation: PDKF
- Named after: Diya Kumari
- Formation: 2013; 13 years ago
- Founder: Diya Kumari
- Type: Charitable organization
- Location: Jaipur, Rajasthan
- Region served: Rajasthan
- Key people: Diya Kumari; Padmanabh Singh; Gauravi Kumari
- Website: princessdiyakumarifoundation.org

The Princess Diya Kumari Foundation (commonly abbreviated PDKF) is a Jaipur-based charity organisation named after Diya Kumari.

== History ==
The foundation was formed in 2013 by Diya Kumari. She founded this foundation to help underprivileged women and girls from rural Rajasthan by providing them with vocational training, education and ways to earn income to become financially independent and productive members of the community. In 2019, the foundation supported Suman Rao's project Pragati. By this project, Suman intended to help the women in tribal communities in getting financial independence. During COVID-19, the foundation distributed essential supplies such as biscuits, soap, toothpaste, toothbrushes, bedsheets, and protective gear such as hand-gloves, masks and sanitary napkins to migrant workers and people confined in isolation centres in Jaipur.

== Trustees ==
Diya Kumari serves as the president of the PDKF. Diya's son Padmanabh Singh serves as the foundation vice-president, and her daughter Gauravi Kumari serves as its general secretary.

== PDKF Store ==
In 2021, Diya's daughter Gauravi Kumari co-founded PDKF Store with French designer Claire Deroo. At this store, people can purchase products made by women and girls trained by the PDKF. All the proceeds generated by sales from the store go to the foundation. The first retail outlet of the store was opened at the City Palace, Jaipur on 20 March 2022.

== Partnerships ==
In 2019, the foundation partnered with Airbnb to train women from rural areas in Rajasthan to become Airbnb hosts and entrepreneurs while at the same time promoting local culture. In 2024, the foundation partnered with Ralph Lauren to host a high-profile fundraising event at City Palace, Jaipur, to raise funds for the foundation's social welfare projects to support disadvantaged communities. In 2025, the foundation partnered with Abercrombie & Kent Philanthropy to start a collective initiative called “Sewing Hope” to provide over 100 underprivileged women in rural Jaipur free sewing training under Project Shakti. The foundation also collaborated with MOI Fine Jewellery to bring traditional beadwork of the Meghwal community of Barmer to the 2026 edition of London Craft Week.

== Polo ==
In 2024, the foundation jointly organised the Princess Diya Kumari Foundation Ladies Polo Cup with the United States Polo Association at Rajasthan Polo Club. A total of three teams, namely Team USPA, Team PDKF and Team RPC, participated in this one-day tournament, and Team PDKF won the cup by defeating Team USPA in the finals by 3-1.
