= Padmini Devi =

Maharani consort of Jaipur (born 1943)

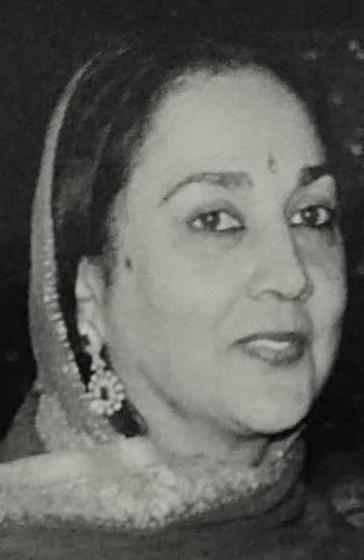
- The Maharani

Titular Maharani consort of Jaipur State
- Incumbent
- Assumed office 1970
- Preceded by: Maharani Gayatri Devi

Personal details
- Born: 29 September 1943 (age 83) Nahan, Sirmur, British India
- Spouse: Bhawani Singh
- Parent(s): Rajendra Prakash, Indira Devi

Padmini Devi (born Princess Padmini Devi of Sirmur; 29 September 1943) is the titular Maharani consort of Jaipur.

== Early life ==
Ethnically born into the royal family of the Sirmur, her father, Maharaja Rajendra Prakash of Sirmur, presently in Himachal Pradesh, was the ruler of Sirmur from 1933–1964. Her mother was Indira Devi, the daughter of Maharaja Thakore Bahadursinhji Mansinhji of Palitana. She received convent education in Mussoorie and then spent time at finishing schools in London and Switzerland.

She heads the Maharaja Sawai Man Singh II Museum as a chairperson. She takes a keen interest in the social activities and welfare of the people of Jaipur in Rajasthan.

== Personal life ==
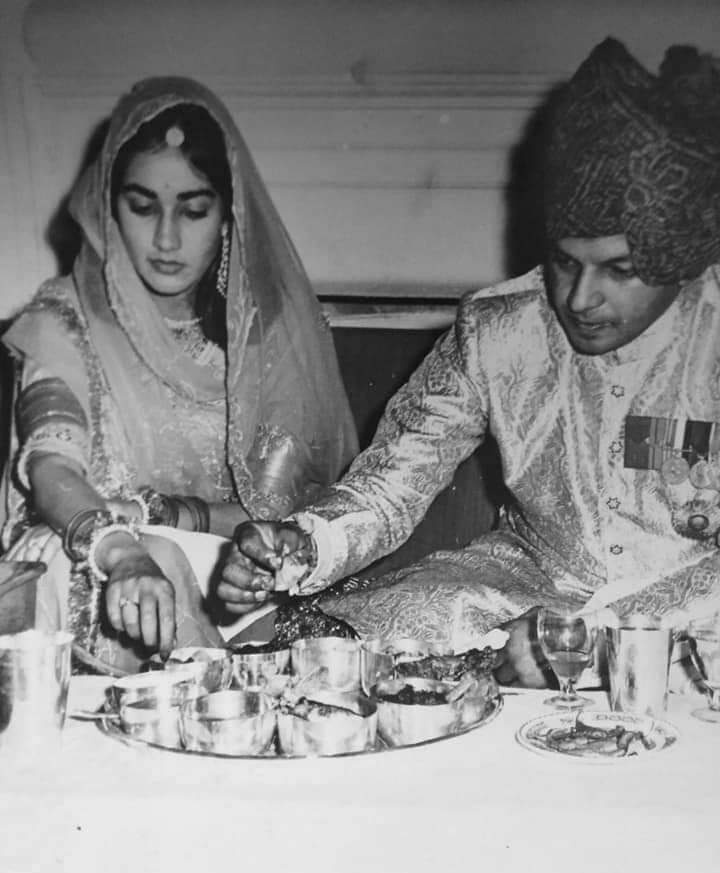
The Maharaja and Maharani of Jaipur

=== Marriage ===
She married Bhawani Singh, eldest son of Maharaja Sawai Man Singh II of Jaipur and his first wife, Maharani Marudhar Kanwar, on 10 March 1966 in a ceremony held at Delhi.

=== Children ===
Her only child, a daughter, Diya Kumari, is member of Indian Parliament from Vidhyadhar Nagar parliamentary seat, and a member of the Bharatiya Janata Party. Currently, she is the 6th Deputy Chief Minister of Rajasthan.

Grandchildren

Her only child and daughter, Princess Diya Kumari was married to Narendra Singh, a commoner, and had 3 children with him. Maharaja Padmanabh Singh of Jaipur who is the current titular king of Jaipur and an established polo player, Princess Gauravi Kumari of Jaipur, who is a feminist also the general secretary of PDKF; and Maharaja Lakshraj Prakash of Sirmur, who is the titular king of Sirmur from where Rajmata belongs to. Rajmata Padmini Devi became maternal grandmother to these children.

Crown Princess Padmini Devi House of Bhati-Sirmaur Cadet branch of the Bhati Dynasty Born: 29 September 1943
Indian royalty
Titles in pretence
Preceded by Princess Gayatri Devi of Cooch Behar	— TITULAR — Queen Consort of Jaipur; 24 June 1970 – 17 April 2011	Vacant
