= Chandrabhan Singh Aakya =

Indian politician (born 1976)

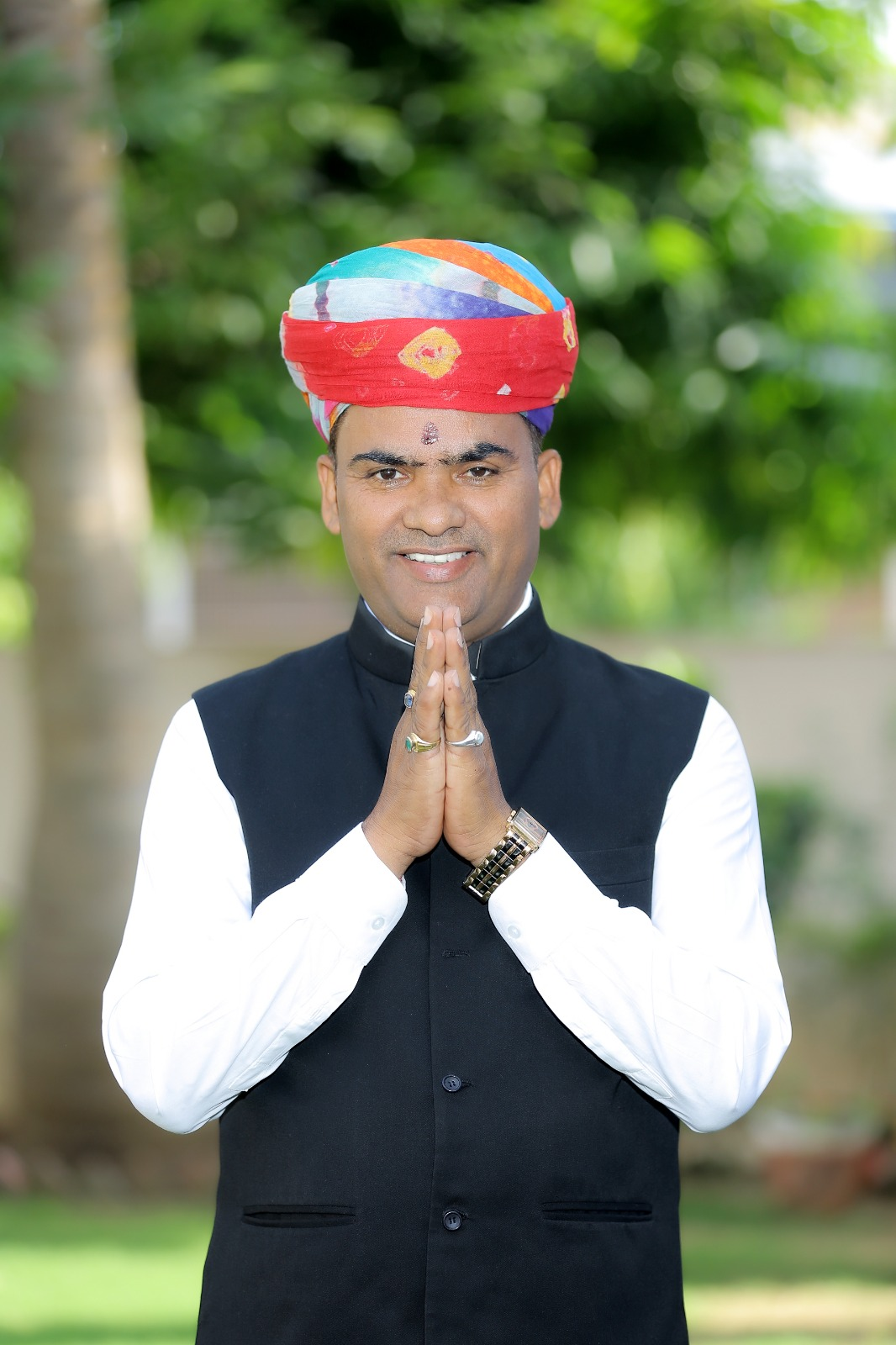

Member of the Rajasthan Legislative Assembly
- Incumbent
- Assumed office 2013
- Preceded by: Surendra Singh Jadawat
- Constituency: Chittorgarh

Personal details
- Born: 5 September 1976 (age 49) Chittorgarh
- Party: Independent
- Other political affiliations: Bharatiya Janata Party (till 23 October 2023)
- Education: M.A. M.P.Ed. (Physical Education); Mohanlal Sukhadia University
- Occupation: Politician

Chandrabhan Singh Chouhan Aakya (born 5 September 1976) is an Indian politician currently serving as a member of the 16th Rajasthan Legislative Assembly, representing the Chittorgarh Assembly constituency. He previously served as a member of the 14th and 15th Rajasthan Legislative Assembly as a Bharatiya Janata Party candidate but currently holds office as an independent candidate. He won the 2023 Rajasthan Assembly election as an independent candidate.

== Education ==
He completed his M.A. in 2000 and earned a postgraduate diploma in Physical Education (M. P.Ed.) in 2001 from Mohanlal Sukhadia University.

== Political career ==
He previously served as an MLA from 2013 to 2018 and again from 2018 to 2023 representing the Chittorgarh Assembly constituency.

Following the 2023 Rajasthan Legislative Assembly election, he was re-elected as an MLA from the Chittorgarh Assembly constituency, defeating Surendra Singh Jadawat, the candidate from the Indian National Congress (INC), by a margin of 6823 votes. and Narpat Singh Rajvi, the candidate from Bharatiya Janta Party (BJP, Narendra Modi) secured only 19913 votes. BJP candidate was lost by margin of 78533 from Winning Candidate and 71710 from Indian National Congress candidate.

Political statistics
| Period | Position Held |
|---|---|
| 2023 | Member of the 16th Rajasthan Legislative Assembly |
| 2018 – 2023 | Member of the 15th Rajasthan Legislative Assembly |
| 2016 – 2018 | Chairman, Committee on Local Bodies and Panchayati Raj Institutions |
| 2013 – 2018 | Member of the 14th Rajasthan Legislative Assembly |
| 2009–2014 | Chairman, Chittorgarh Kendriya Sahkari Bank Ltd. |
| 1997 | College President in Akhil Bharatiya Vidyarthi Parishad |

== Controversies ==
=== 2026 RTO Confrontation and Viral Audio ===
In March 2026, a purported audio recording surfaced on social media capturing a heated exchange between Shree. Aakya and RTO Inspector Sushil Upadhyay regarding a traffic challan issued to a heavy machinery vehicle (Poclain machine). In the recording, the MLA allegedly used abusive language and threatened the officer with administrative consequences.

Shree. Aakya dismissed the audio as a "politically motivated fabrication" and claimed it had been deliberately edited by his detractors to malign his reputation. Despite the controversy, no official order was issued to cancel the fine, and the incident drew criticism from opposition leaders for the alleged misuse of political influence.

== Resignation from BJP ==
He was denied BJP ticket from Chittorgarh. His candidacy was given to Narpat Singh Rajvi, former MLA from Vidhyadhar Nagar, who had previously served as an MLA from Chittorgarh twice, in 1993 and 2003.

He resigned from the party and contested as an independent candidate in the 2023 Assembly election.

== Personal life ==
He married Sushila Kanwar. His wife is a homemaker.
