= Gauravi Kumari =

Member of the Jaipur Royal family

- Born: c. 1999
- Education: New York University; Mayo College Girls School
- Parents: Narendra Singh (father); Diya Kumari (mother)
- Relatives: Padmanabh Singh (brother); Lakshraj Prakash (brother)

Gauravi Kumari (born 1999) is the second child of Diya Kumari and her former husband Narendra Singh, and a grandchild of Bhawani Singh and Padmini Devi.

== Early life, family, and education ==
Gauravi was born to Diya Kumari and Narendra Singh in 1999. She has an older brother, Padmanabh Singh, and a younger brother, Lakshraj Prakash. She first studied at Mayo College Girls School in Ajmer. Following that, she went to New York University and graduated with a degree in media and communication. She made her debut at the Le Bal des Débutantes in Paris in 2017. In December 2018, her parents started divorce proceedings, which were finalised that year.

== Career ==
Following her studies at the Mayo, she interned at the New York-based Paper magazine. Gauravi has been involved in charitable work since 2019, when she joined the Princess Diya Kumari Foundation, an organisation founded by her mother, as its General Secretary. Her charitable work focuses primarily on the empowerment of women and girls in rural Rajasthan. She co-founded the PDKF Store with French designer Claire Deroo in 2021. In 2022, Travel + Leisure India & South Asia awarded her its inaugural T+L Champion award for women empowerment. In 2023, she collaborated with Anita Dongre and presented a fashion show called “Rewild 23” to raise money for nature and elephant conservation. All profits from it were donated to the Nature Conservation Foundation. She later founded The Palace Atelier at the City Palace, Jaipur, with Deroo in 2024. She is a brand ambassador for brands such as Jimmy Choo and Kama Ayurveda.

== Personal life ==
On 4 June 2024, while in Edinburgh, she, along with her father and brother Padmanabh, met a serious road accident and got injured. All three of them were later shifted to London where they remained for six weeks. Kumari attended the 2026 Met Gala dressed by designer Prabal Gurung; she wore a gown made from her step great-grandmother Gayatri Devi's old chiffon saree.
