= Lakshraj Prakash =

Member of the House of Sirmur

- Born: Lakshraj Singh; 24 March 2004 (age 22)
- Education: Mayo College; Millfield; Queen Mary University of London
- Parent(s): Diya Kumari (mother); Narendra Singh (father)
- Relatives: Padmanabh Singh (brother); Gauravi Kumari (sister)

Lakshraj Prakash (born 24 March 2004) is the third child of Diya Kumari and her former husband Narendra Singh, and since 15 May 2013 has been the pretender to the now-defunct throne of Sirmur.

== Early life, education, and family ==
Lakshraj Prakash was born on 24 March 2004 as the younger child of Narendra Singh and Diya Kumari. Lakshraj has an elder brother, Padmanabh Singh, and an elder sister, Gauravi Kumari. On his maternal side, he is a grandson of Bhawani Singh and Padmini Devi. In December 2018, his parents started divorce proceedings, which were finalised that year. He was educated at Mayo College in Ajmer and subsequently attended Millfield in Street, Somerset. In 2023, he enrolled at Queen Mary University of London in England. In November 2022, he attended the Le Bal des débutantes in Paris with Leah Behn.

== Succession ==
Upon the death of Rajendra Prakash on 13 November 1964, the title, rank, and dignity of the Maharaja of Sirmur lapsed, as he left no male heir. He was married to two consorts: Durga Devi and Indira Devi. With Durga Devi, he had a daughter, Nalini Devi; with Indira Devi, he had another daughter, Padmini Devi. Durga Devi adopted her maternal grandson, Udai Singh, as the successor to her late husband. This adoption, and the succession it implied, was neither recognised by the Government of India nor accepted by the wider royal family or clan. Approximately forty-nine years after the death of Rajendra Prakash, members of the erstwhile royal family of Sirmur, along with senior nobles of the former state, assembed in Jaipur on 17 March 2014. There, they approached Padmini Devi and requested that her maternal grandson, Lakshraj Prakash, be sent to Sirmur to assume the throne, which had remained unoccupied since the death of her father. With the consent of both Padmini Devi and the parents of Lakshraj Prakash, he was formally inducted into the Atri gotra of the royal house on 13 April 2013.

He acceded to the throne of the former state of Sirmur at the Palace in Nahan following his raj tilak (transl. Coronation) on 15 May 2013. On this occasion, Ajay Bahadur Singh presented him with the sword of Guru Gobind Singh, which had originally been given by the Guru to the ancestors of the royal family. As was a minor at the time, Ajay Bahadur Singh was appointed regent until he attained the age of majority. His title holds no official status under Indian law, as the Twenty-Sixth Amendment to the Constitution of India abolished the formal recognition of royal titles, privileges, and associated entitlements previously granted to the rulers of princely states.
