= Amar Prakash =

Maharaja Amar Prakash
- His Highness the Maharaja Sahib of Sirmur
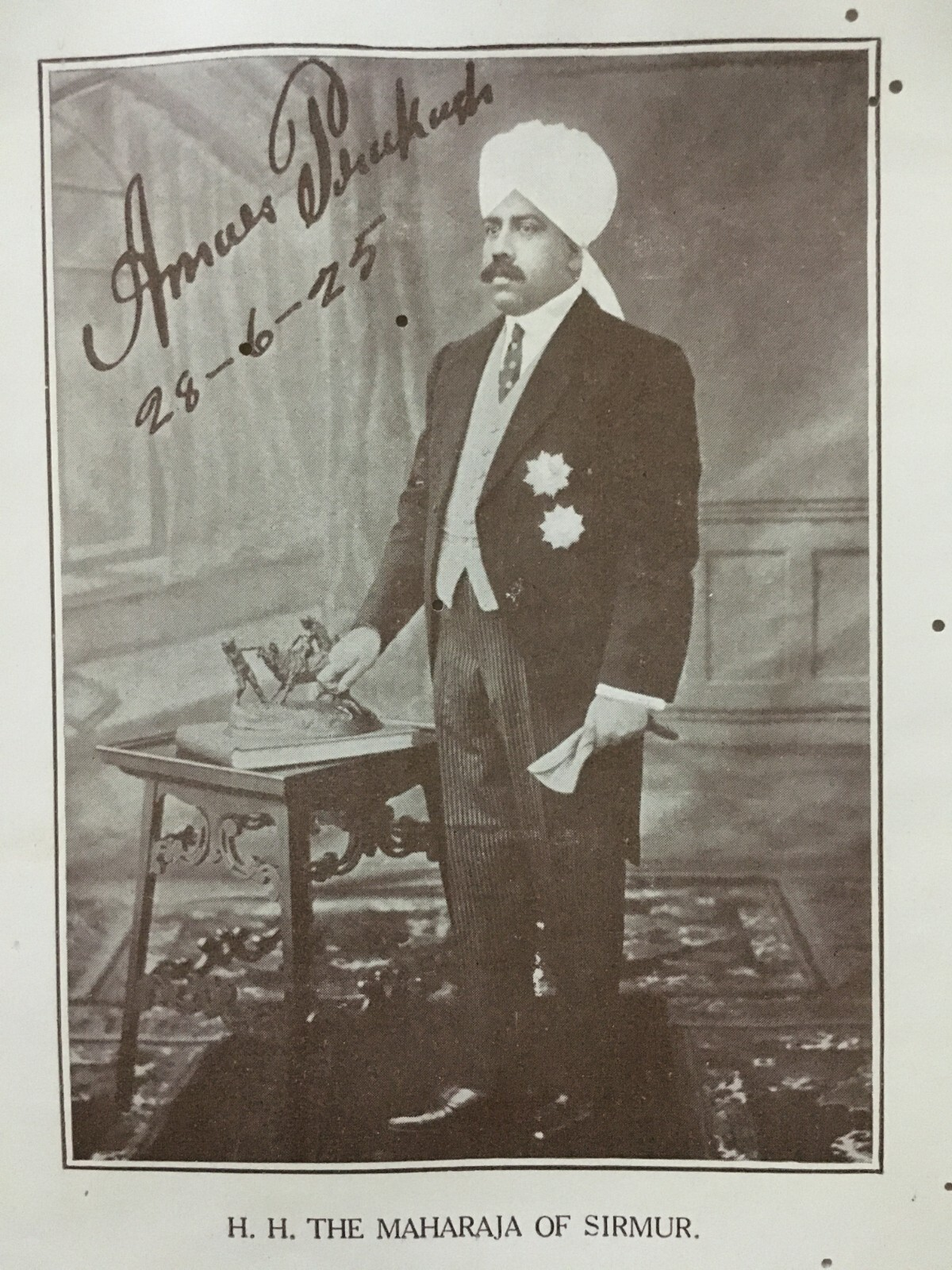

Maharaja of Sirmur
- Reign: 1911-1933
- Predecessor: Surendra Bikram Prakash
- Successor: Rajendra Prakash
- Born: 26 January 1888; Nahan, Sirmur State, British India
- Died: 13 August 1933 (aged 45); Vienna, Austria
- Consort: Mandalsa Devi
- Issue: Mahima Kumari; Rajendra Prakash; Premlata Kumari
- Father: Surendra Bikram Prakash
- Mother: Subhadra Devi

Amar Prakash, K.C.S.I., K.C.I.E., was the Maharaja of Sirmur State from 1911 until 1933.

== Biography ==
Amar Prakash was born on 26 January 1888 to Surendra Bikram Prakash, Raja of Sirmur. He was educated privately and received administrative training during the time of his father. He succeeded to the Gaddi on the death of his father in 1911. He was installed on the Gaddi by Sir Louis Dane, the Lieutenant-Governor of the Punjab. He married Mandalsa Devi, eldest daughter of Dev Shumsher Jang Bahadur Rana, ex-Prime Minister of Nepal.

- Mahima Kumari.
- Rajendra Prakash.
- Premlata Kumari.

He died of meningitis in Vienna on 13 August 1933. He was succeeded by his son, Rajendra Prakash as the Maharaja of Sirmur.
