= Vishal =

Vishal may refer to:

== People ==
- Vishal (name), a common Indian given name
- King Vishal, emperor of the Mahabharata era who founded the ancient city of Vishalapura
- Vishal (actor) (born 1977), Indian film actor, producer and anti-piracy activist
- Vishal–Shekhar, Indian musical duo consisting of Vishal Dadlani and Shekhar Ravjiani

== Buildings and places ==
- De Vishal, a historical building and gallery in Haarlem, the Netherlands.
- Vishalgad, fort of Shivaji in Maharashtra
- Vishal Badri, synonym of the Badrinath temple in Uttarakhand's Himalaya

== Politics ==
- Vishal Haryana Party, a former political party
- Vishal Sangh, a former trade union in Fiji

== Other uses ==
- INS Vishal (IAC-II), aircraft carrier of Indian Navy
- Vishal Film Factory, owned by the Indian actor Vishal
- Vishal Agnihotri, character portrayed by Sunil Shetty in the 1994 Indian film Mohra

== See also ==
- Vaishali (disambiguation)
- Visaal – Ghazals for Connoisseurs, an album by Indian singer Hariharan
