= Rajendra Prakash =

Maharaja of Sirmur from 1933 until 1964

- His Highness the Maharaja Sahib of Sirmur

Maharaja of Sirmur
- Reign: 13 August 1933 – 6 November 1964
- Coronation: 13 February 1935
- Investiture: 24 November 1938
- Predecessor: Amar Prakash
- Successor: Lakshraj Prakash
- Born: 11 January 1913; Nahan, Sirmur State, British India
- Died: 6 November 1964 (aged 51); Dehradun, India
- Consort(s): Durga Devi; Indira Devi
- Issue: Nalini Devi; Padmini Devi; Udai Prakash (adoptive)
- Father: Amar Prakash
- Mother: Mandalasa Kumari

Rajendra Prakash, KCIE, forty-eight direct male lineal descendant from the original founder of the Dynasty, served as the Maharaja of Sirmur from 1933 until 1964.

== Birth ==
He was born on 11 January 1913 to Amar Prakash and his wife Mandalasa Kumari.

== Reign ==
He succeeded his father, Amar Prakash, upon his death on 13 August 1933. However, his coronation was performed on 13 February 1935, and he was invested with full ruling powers on 24 November 1938.

== Personal life ==
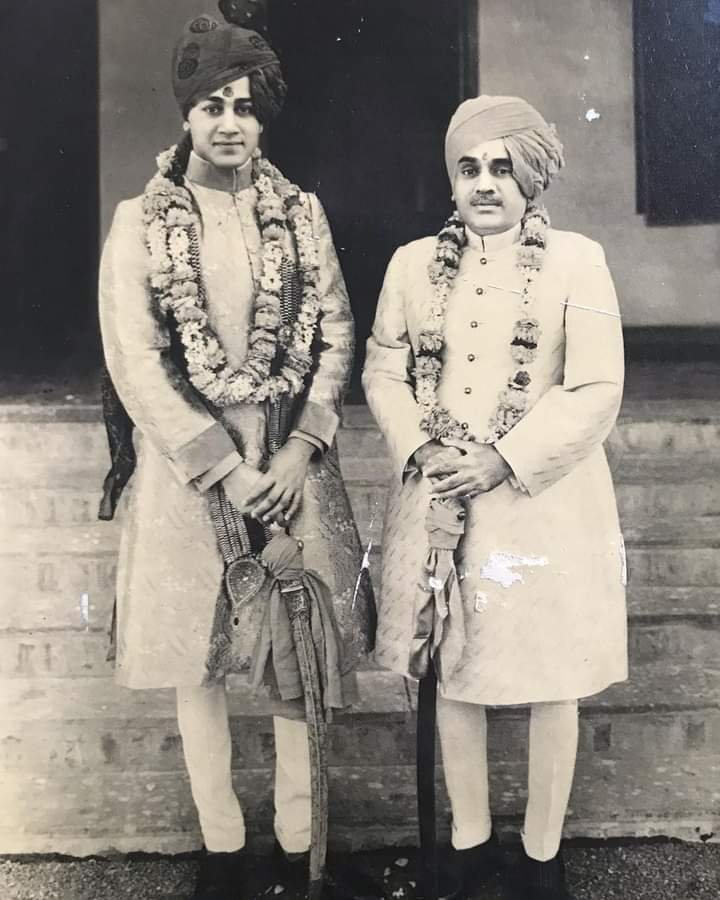
The rulers of Sirmur and Palitana

=== Marriages ===
In 1936, he married his first wife, Durga Devi, the daughter of the Raja Yaduvendra Singh of Nagod. His second marriage was with Indira Devi, the daughter of Thakore Sir Bahadursinhji Mansinhji of Palitana in 1941.

=== Children ===
Rajendra Prakash was the father of two daughters, Nalini Devi (by his first wife) and Padmini Devi (by his second wife). Nalini Devi married Vidur Singh, son of the Raja of Alipura, in 1952. Padmini Devi, married Bhawani Singh, son of Man Singh II, in 1967.

== Death ==
He died on 6 November 1964. After his death, his widow Durga Kumari adopted Udai Prakash in 1965, who subsequently assumed the Rajendra titles. However, on 15 May 2013, at the insistence of former Sirmur state nobles who challenged Udai's accession, Padmini Devi installed her grandson Lakshraj to her father's titles at the Nahan Palace. His death led to a dispute over the property between Padmini Devi and Udai Prakash. The dispute, which continued for 23 years, was settled in 2011 by the High Court of Himachal Pradesh, and the property was divided between them.
