= Vaishali =

Vaishali may refer to:

== Places ==
- Vaishali district, a district in Bihar, India
  - Vaishali (ancient city), an ancient city located in current Vaishali district
  - Basarh, the modern location of the ancient city, often called Vaishali
  - Vaishali (community development block)
  - Vaishali (Lok Sabha constituency), a Lok Sabha constituency in Bihar
  - Vaishali (Vidhan Sabha constituency), an assembly constituency in Bihar
- Vaishali metro station, a metro station of Delhi Metro in Ghaziabad
- Vaishali Nagar (Jaipur), a neighborhood in Jaipur, Rajasthan, India

== People ==
- Vaishali Bankar, mayor of Pune, Maharashtra, India
- Vaishali Desai (born 1989), Indian model and actress
- Vaishali Mhade (born 1984), Indian-Marathi singer, winner of Zee TV's reality series Sa Re Ga Ma Pa Challenge 2009
- Vaishali Kasaravalli (1952–2010), Indian Kannada actor, television serial director and costume designer
- Vaishali Samant, Indian-Marathi singer from Maharashtra; popular for her song "Aaika Dagiba"
- Vaishali Harin Gohil (born 1972), Gujarati folk singer
- Vaishali Thakkar (born 1964), Indian actress
- Vaishali Rameshbabu (born 2001), Indian chess player

== Other uses ==
- Vishal (disambiguation)
- Eeram, a 2009 Tamil film dubbed in Telugu as Vaishali
- Vaisali (film), a 1988 Malayalam film directed and edited by Bharathan
- Vaishali Express, a train running between stations Barauni and New Delhi, India
- Vaishali (restaurant), a restaurant in Pune, Maharashtra, India
