= Chittorgarh Assembly constituency =

Constituency of the Rajasthan Legislative Assembly in India

Coordinates: 24.9°N 74.63°E

Chittorgarh
- Constituency No. 169 for the Rajasthan Legislative Assembly

Constituency details
- Country: India
- Region: North India
- State: Rajasthan
- District: Chittorgarh
- Lok Sabha constituency: Chittorgarh
- Established: 1951
- Total electors: 270,246
- Reservation: None

Member of Legislative Assembly
- 16th Rajasthan Legislative Assembly
- Incumbent Chandrabhan Singh Aakya
- Party: Independent
- Elected year: 2023

Chittorgarh Assembly constituency is one of the 200 Legislative Assembly constituencies of Rajasthan state in India. It is in Chittorgarh district and is a part of Chittorgarh Lok Sabha Constituency.

== Member of the Legislative Assembly ==
Election	Name	Party	Voter turnout
1951	Pratap Singh	Bharatiya Jana Sangh	
1957	Lal Singh	Indian National Congress	
1962	Chatarbhuj Upadhaya	Indian National Congress	
1967	R. Kumar	Indian National Congress	
1972	Nirmala Kumari	Indian National Congress	
1977	Laxman Singh	Janata Party	
1980	Shobrajmal	Indian National Congress	
1985	Laxman Singh	Indian National Congress	
1990	Vijay Singh Jhala	Bharatiya Janata Party	
1993	Narpat Singh Rajvi	Bharatiya Janata Party	
1998	Surendra Singh Jadawat	Indian National Congress	
2003	Narpat Singh Rajvi	Bharatiya Janata Party	
2008	Surendra Singh Jadawat	Indian National Congress	73.5%
2013	Chandrabhan Singh Aakya	Bharatiya Janata Party	81.35%
2018	Chandrabhan Singh Aakya	Bharatiya Janata Party	79.56%
2023	Chandrabhan Singh Aakya	Independent	

== Election results ==
=== 2023 ===
Rajasthan Legislative Assembly Election, 2018: Chittorgarh
Party	Candidate	Votes	%	±%
Independent	Chandrabhan Singh Aakya	98,446	45.35	
INC	Surendra Singh Jadawat	91,623	42.21	+0.78
BJP	Narpat Singh Rajvi	19,913	9.17	−44.24
NOTA	None of the above	1,527	0.7	−0.31
Majority		6,823	3.14	−8.84
Turnout		217,079	80.33	+0.02
Independent gain from BJP		Swing		

=== 2018 ===
Rajasthan Legislative Assembly Election, 2018: Chittorgarh
Party	Candidate	Votes	%	±%
BJP	Chandrabhan Singh Aakya	106,563	53.41	
INC	Surendra Singh Jadawat	82,669	41.43	
CPI	Mangi Lal Bairwa	2,281	1.14	
NOTA	None of the above	2,012	1.01	
Majority		23,894	11.98	
Turnout		199,515	80.31	

== See also ==
- List of constituencies of the Rajasthan Legislative Assembly
- Chittorgarh district
