= Vishal Singh (polo player) =

Indian polo player

Vishal Singh Rathore is a professional polo player from Rajasthan India, he is also known for his horse riding skills and polo pony training. He currently plays for Rajasthan Polo Club and has been the captain for the India national team 7 times.

Rathore runs own polo club "Cavallo Riding and Polo club" in partnership with Sharvan singh. He also manages and trains polo ponies owned by over half of the official polo teams in India.

He coached many players some famed ones of those are Ashok Chandna (sports minister Rajasthan), Sawai Padmanabh Singh from Jaipur erstwhile royal family, Ali brothers Hyderabad, Jodhpur polo team and more than 60 national and international players.

Vishal Singh Rathore as one of the youngest polo players represented his country as captain in world cup, he was awarded the Maharaja Sawai Man Singh Award in 2001. youth icon award by Amity college in 2007. He has played national polo matches representing India in countries like Argentina, England, America, UK, USA and Dubai.
