= Narpat Singh Rajvi =

Indian politician

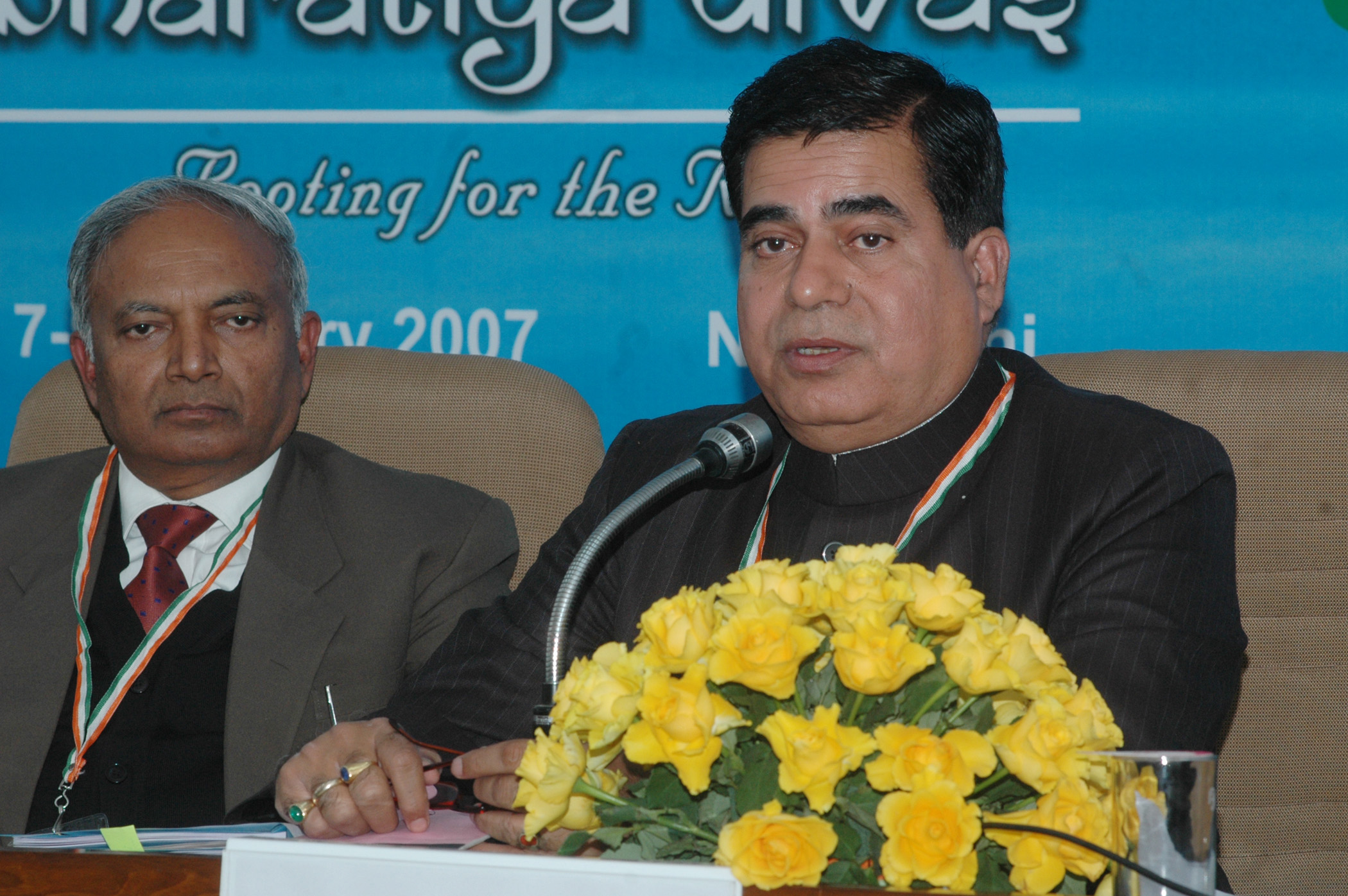
- Narpat Singh Rajvi

Member of the Rajasthan Legislative Assembly
- In office 2008–2023
- Succeeded by: Diya Kumari
- Constituency: Vidhyadhar Nagar
- In office 2003–2008
- Preceded by: Surendra Singh Jadawat
- Succeeded by: Surendra Singh Jadawat
- Constituency: Chittorgarh
- In office 1993–1998
- Preceded by: Vijay Singh Jhala
- Succeeded by: Surendra Singh Jadawat
- Constituency: Chittorgarh

Personal details
- Born: 3 February 1952 (age 74) Bikaner
- Party: Bharatiya Janata Party
- Education: M.A., LL.B.
- Alma mater: Dungar College
- Occupation: Politician, agriculturist

Narpat Singh Rajvi (born 23 January 1952) is a former Member of Legislative Assembly from Vidhyadhar Nagar constituency for five terms representing Bharatiya Janata Party.

== Political journey ==
In 1990, Rajvi was credited with having engineered a split in the Janata Dal to save the Bhairon Singh-led BJP government, after ties between the two parties soured over L. K. Advani’s Rath Yatra.

He was a MLA from Chittorgarh in 1993 and 2003 respectively. He has served as the Minister of Health and Industries in the government of Rajasthan.

Since 2008, he fought assembly elections from Vidhyadhar Nagar, Jaipur and won 3 times (2008, 2013, and 2018). In the 2013 elections, Rajvi defeated the INC candidate by a huge margin of 37,920 votes. His winning performance is attributed largely to the voters’ attachment to three-time Rajasthan Chief Minister Bhairon Singh, whose memorial is a prominent structure in the constituency.

He was denied ticket from Vidhyadhar Nagar which resulted in discontent from his supporters. He made statements that sparked controversy. He alleged that Diya Kumari, who was given his candidature, came from the family which bowed down to Mughals. He was later pacified with a ticket from Chittorgarh, from where two-time winning MLA Chandrabhan Singh Aakya was dropped, which again created a huge uproar amongst the party workers who were supporters of the sitting MLA.

Positions held by Narpat Singh Rajvi
Period	Position Held in Rajasthan Government
2023	BJP Candidate from Chittorgarh Constituency
2019 -	Member, Tenure Committee
2017 - 2018	Member, Public Undertakings Committee
2015 - 2016	Member, Rules Committee, Rules Sub-Committee
2014	Member, Tenure Committee
2009 - 2013	Member, Public Undertakings Committee
2008 -	MLA from Vidhyadhar Nagar Constituency, 13th, 14th, 15th Rajasthan Assembly
2007 - 2008	Minister, Family Welfare Department Minister, Medical and Health Department Minister, Ayurveda Department
2004 - 2007	Minister, Department of Public Undertakings Minister, Department of Khadi and Village Industries Minister, N.R.I. Department
2004	Minister, Labour and Employment Department
2003 - 2008	MLA from Chittorgarh Constituency, 12th Rajasthan Assembly
2003 - 2007	Minister, Department of Commerce
1998	Lost from Chittorgarh Constituency, 11th Rajasthan Assembly
1994 - 1998	Member, General Purposes Committee Member, Tenure Committee
1994 - 1995	Chairman, Tenure Committee
1993 - 1994	Member, Committee to investigate the activities of Rajasthan Housing Board
1993 - 1998	MLA from Chittorgarh Constituency, 10th Rajasthan Assembly
Political Positions
2002 - 2003	State General Secretary, BJP Rajasthan
1991 - 1992	State General Secretary, BJP Rajasthan
1990 - 1991	State Secretary, BJP Rajasthan

== Personal life ==
He is a post-graduate - M.A. (Hons.) and L.L.B. from Dungar College, Bikaner. He was born to Rajvi Amar Singh, a judge, and Rani Jaswant Kanwar in a Rajput family. He is married to a home-maker Ratan Kanwar, the daughter of senior Indian politician and former vice-president of India late Bhairon Singh Shekhawat. They have three children: one daughter, Mumal Rajvi, a lawyer by profession, and two sons, Vikramaditya Singh Rajvi who is studying currently in London and Abhimanyu Singh Rajvi, the vice president of BJP Yuva Morcha in Rajasthan, much seen as a political heir to his grandfather. He is interested in forest conservation, wild-life study and inter-state river water agreement (Punjab, Haryana, Rajasthan). He has worked in government service as Senior Accountant prior to joining politics.
