= Diya Kumari =

6th Deputy Chief Minister of Rajasthan

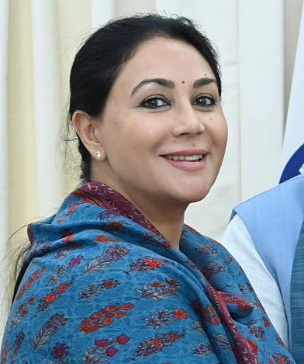
- Kumari in 2023

Deputy Chief Minister of Rajasthan
- Incumbent
- Assumed office 15 December 2023 Serving with Prem Chand Bairwa
- Governor: Kalraj Mishra; Haribhau Bagade
- Chief Minister: Bhajan Lal Sharma
- Ministry and Departments: List: Finance; Tourism; Art, Literature, Culture and Archeology; Public Works; Women & Child Development; Child Empowerment
- Preceded by: Sachin Pilot (2020)

Member of Rajasthan Legislative Assembly
- Incumbent
- Assumed office 3 December 2023
- Preceded by: Narpat Singh Rajvi
- Constituency: Vidhyadhar Nagar
- In office 8 December 2013 – 11 December 2018
- Preceded by: Alauddin Azad
- Succeeded by: Danish Abrar
- Constituency: Sawai Madhopur

Member of Parliament, Lok Sabha
- In office 23 May 2019 – 6 December 2023
- Preceded by: Hariom Singh Rathore
- Succeeded by: Mahima Kumari Mewar
- Constituency: Rajsamand, Rajasthan

Chairperson of RSRDC Corporation
- Incumbent
- Assumed office 15 March 2024
- Minister: Prem Chand Bairwa
- Preceded by: Bhajan Lal Jatav

Personal details
- Born: 30 January 1971 (age 55) Jaipur, Rajasthan, India
- Party: Bharatiya Janata Party
- Spouse: Narendra Singh (div. 2018)
- Relations: Kachhwaha Family
- Children: 3, including Padmanabh Singh, Gauravi Kumari, and Lakshraj Prakash
- Parents: Bhawani Singh (father); Padmini Devi (mother)
- Education: Modern School, New Delhi; Maharani Gayatri Devi Girls' Public School; Chelsea College of Arts, London; Amity University, Jaipur
- Website: www.diyakumariofficial.com

Diya Kumari (born 30 January 1971) is an Indian politician from Bharatiya Janata Party currently serving as the Deputy Chief Minister of Rajasthan alongside Prem Chand Bairwa in the ministry of Bhajan Lal Sharma from 2023 December. She currently represents Vidhyadhar Nagar as an MLA in the 16th Rajasthan Legislative Assembly. She is a member of Kachhwaha family of the Jaipur State.

She was a member of Lok Sabha from Rajsamand parliamentary seat between 2019 and 2023.

Kumari is the granddaughter of Man Singh II, the last ruling Maharaja of the princely state of Jaipur during the British Raj in India.

== Early life and education ==
Kumari was born on 30 January 1971 in Jaipur to Bhawani Singh, a decorated Indian Army officer and hotelier, and Padmini Devi. She is the granddaughter of Man Singh II, the last ruling Maharaja of the princely state of Jaipur during the British Raj.

Kumari attended Modern School (New Delhi), G.D. Somani Memorial School, Mumbai and Maharani Gayatri Devi Girls' Public School, Jaipur. She holds a Graduate Diploma in Fine Art (Decorative Painting) educated at Chelsea School of Arts, London in 1989 and a Hon. Doctorate in Philosophy from Amity University, Jaipur.

== Personal life ==
Kumari has three children, Padmanabh Singh, Gauravi Kumari and Lakshraj Prakash, from her marriage to Narendra Singh.

Kumari owns a foundation, named the Princess Diya Kumari Foundation, which she runs with her children working on women empowerment via social entrepreneurship.

== Political career ==
The Deputy Chief Minister of Rajasthan, Shrimathi Diya Kumari & her colleague meet vice president of India with their head in 2023

Ms. Diya Kumari is a seasoned Indian politician hailing from the state of Rajasthan, currently serving as the Deputy Chief Minister. She oversees several key portfolios in the Rajasthan state government, including Finance, Tourism, Art and Culture, Public Works, Child Rights, and Women and Child Development. She represents the Vidyhadhar Nagar constituency in Jaipur, which she won by the highest margin in the December 2023 Rajasthan Legislative Assembly elections. Ms. Diya Kumari was first elected to the Rajasthan Legislative Assembly in 2013, representing the Sawai Madhopur constituency, and then served as a Member of Indian Parliament (Lok Sabha) for the Rajsamand constituency from 2019 until 2024 when she took up her current post. Throughout her tenure, she has focused on promoting inclusive development, particularly in underdeveloped rural areas focusing on youth, women and the unprivileged. During the span of her public service career, she has served as a member of various committees including the Inter-Parliamentary Union (IPU) Standing Committee of United Nations (UN) Affairs, the Standing Committee on Railways, the National Tiger Conservation Authority and the Consultative Committee for the Ministry of Culture & Tourism, and was the Save the Girl Child ambassador. Prior to joining public service, Ms. Diya Kumari was engaged in many philanthropic and charitable initiatives. She has been a committed patron of the artistic and cultural heritage of Rajasthan, serving as an active member of several charitable trusts. She has also been closely involved with various educational institutions, charities and NGOs working in many fields, with a strong focus on supporting women’s and girls’ education, training, economic empowerment, and maternal and childhood health and wellbeing. Service of the people is the aim of all her endeavors in public life, inspired by the ideology of Antyodaya – serving the poorest of the poor.

== Rajasthan Budget 2026–27 ==
In February 2026, Diya Kumari, serving as the Deputy Chief Minister and Finance Minister of Rajasthan, presented the Rajasthan Budget 2026–27 in the State Legislative Assembly. The budget outlined the state government's priorities in infrastructure development, healthcare expansion, welfare measures for farmers, women and youth, and fiscal management.

The budget included measures such as free healthcare coverage for individuals lacking documentation, relief initiatives for farmers, and schemes aimed at supporting women and youth.

The presentation of the budget drew reactions from opposition parties, who raised concerns regarding employment generation, rising debt, and implementation gaps in projects.

== Electoral record ==
Election results
Year	Office	Constituency	Party	Votes for Diya Kumari	%	Opponent	Party	Votes	%	Margin	Result	Ref
2013	Member of the Legislative Assembly	Sawai Madhopur	Bharatiya Janata Party	57,384	37.29	Kirodi Lal Meena	National People's Party	49,852	38.68	7,532	Won	
2019	Member of the Lok Sabha	Rajsamand	Bharatiya Janata Party	863,039	69.61	Devikinandan Gurjar	Indian National Congress	311,123	25.09	551,916	Won	
2023	Member of the Legislative Assembly	Vidhyadhar Nagar	Bharatiya Janata Party	158,516	63.30	Sitaram Agarwal	Indian National Congress	87,148	34.80	71,368	Won	
