= Padmanabh Singh =

Indian polo player (born 1998)

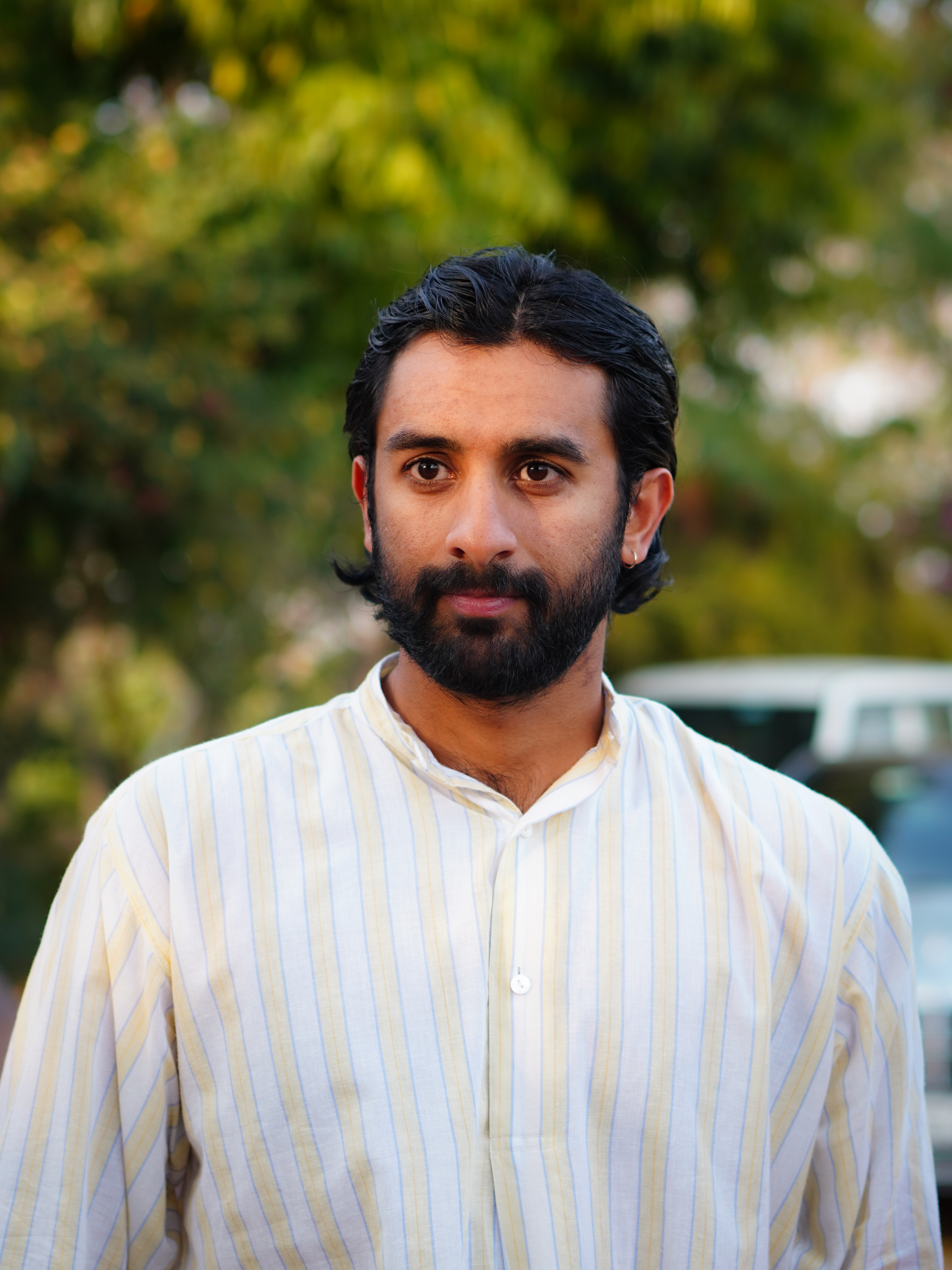

Head of the Jaipur Royal Family
- Tenure: 17 April 2011 – present
- Predecessor: Bhawani Singh
- Born: 2 July 1998 (age 28); New Delhi, India
- House: Kachhwaha
- Other name: Pacho
- Education: Mayo College; Millfield School
- Alma mater: Università e Nobil Collegio Sant'Eligio
- Parents: Narendra Singh (father); Diya Kumari (mother)
- Relatives: Gauravi Kumari (brother); Lakshraj Prakash (brother); Bhawani Singh (grandfather) (Note: adoptive father); Padmini Devi (grandmother) (Note: adoptive mother)
- Modeling information
- Hair color: black
- Eye color: dark brown
- Sports career
- Sport: Polo
- Team: Indian national team

Sports achievements and titles
- National finals: Indian Open Polo Cup

Padmanabh Singh (born 2 July 1998) is an Indian polo player, guest model, and head of the Kachhwaha clan in Jaipur, the erstwhile ruling dynasty of the Jaipur State.

== Personal life ==
Padmanabh Singh was born in New Delhi on 2 July 1998 to Diya Kumari, an Indian politician, and her husband, Narendra Singh. Having half-brothers but no son, in November 2002 his maternal grandfather, Bhawani Singh, adopted him and made him his heir. He was educated at Mayo College in Ajmer and at Millfield, a public school in Street, Somerset, England. He attended New York University in 2017 and majored in liberal arts, however in 2018 he enrolled in Università e Nobil Collegio Sant'Eligio in Rome, studying cultural heritage management, art history and the Italian language and graduated in 2022. He is known as Pacho by his loved ones and friends, a nickname from his grandmother, Rajmata Padmini Devi.

Singh is the great-grandson of Man Singh II, the last ruling Maharaja of the princely state of Jaipur in India during the British Raj, though the relationship is not patrilineal. Singh's mother is the only daughter of the late Bhawani Singh, an Indian soldier, hotelier, and the son of Man Singh II. His father is the son of a former member of staff of Bhawani Singh. Singh's parents divorced in 2018.

Upon Bhawani Singh's death in 2011, the 12-year-old Padmanabh Singh was installed as the titular "Maharaja of Jaipur". Although princely pensions, titles, and privileges were officially abolished in India in 1971, families of some former princely rulers have continued to use the old titles unofficially for certain family members, or made new ones for themselves. In some instances, the titles are used in conducting family ceremonies and traditions, to promote the ideal of princely India for tourists, and to sustaining the wealth, stardom, and clout some families have retained.

On 4 June 2024, while in Edinburgh, he, his father, and his sister, Gauravi Kumari, met a serious road accident and sustained injuries. He suffered three major spinal fractures and subsequently underwent surgery, during which a plate and four screws were inserted into his spine. Following the surgery, the three were transferred to London, where they remained for six weeks, and while in London, Singh underwent physiotherapy. Singh attended the Met Gala on 4 May 2026 in a phulghar coat that took over 600 hours to create and was developed in collaboration with designer Prabal Gurung and by artisans Yash and Ashima Tholia.

== Polo ==
Padmanabh Singh began playing competitive polo in 2015 in England and has been a member of Guards Polo Club. In 2017, he led the Indian national team at Hurlingham Park in what was the first visit to the venue by an Indian team in over 70 years. His grandfather had led the last successful Indian polo tour of the UK.
