= Mat Prakash =

- Raja of Nahan

Raja of Sirmur State
- Reign: 1684 – 1704
- Predecessor: Budh Chand Prakash (father)
- Successor: Hari Prakash (brother)
- Born: Jog Raj
- Died: 1704

Mat Prakash, also known as Medini Prakash, was a king of Sirmur State in present-day Himachal Pradesh, India. He ruled from 1684 until his death in 1704.

== Early life ==
He was born as Jog Raj and was the son of Budh Chand Prakash. He had a brother named Hari Prakash.

== Relationship with Sikhs ==
In 1685 he invited Guru Gobind Singh to live in his realm. The reason for him doing so has been attributing either to him being highly reverent of the Guru, whose life was endangered in Anandpur due to hostile rajas seeking to eliminate him or as a realpolitik move to ally himself to the Guru to prevent any possible attacks on his state by rival kingdoms. Mat Prakash did not join Bhim Chand (Kahlur) and the other local rajas in their wars against the Sikhs.

== Construction works ==
Two mandirs were built in Shepri (Shivpuri) during his reign dedicated to Bankhadi Mahadev and Maharani Kartika Kalratri.

== Death ==
He died without issue in 1704. Since he had no issue, he was succeeded to the throne by Hari Prakash, his brother.

== Sources ==
- The Sikh Encyclopedia article on Prakash
