= Surendra Singh Jadawat =

Indian politician (born 1955)

Chair of the Rajasthan Heritage Conservation and Promotion Authority (RHCPA) Government of Rajasthan
- In office February 2022 – November 2023
- Preceded by: Onkar Singh Lakhawat

Minister of State
- In office February 2022 – November 2023

Member of the Rajasthan Legislative Assembly
- In office 2008–2013
- Chief Minister: Ashok Gehlot
- Preceded by: Narpat Singh Rajvi
- Succeeded by: Chandrabhan Singh Aakya
- Constituency: Chittorgarh
- In office 1998–2003
- Chief Minister: Ashok Gehlot
- Preceded by: Narpat Singh Rajvi
- Succeeded by: Narpat Singh Rajvi
- Constituency: Chittorgarh

Personal details
- Born: 1955 (age 70–71)
- Party: Indian National Congress
- Parent: Shakti Singh (father)
- Occupation: Politician, farmer
- Website: Surendra Singh Jadawat on X Surendra Singh Jadawat on Instagram

Surendra Singh Jadawat is an Indian politician and former Chairman of Rajasthan Heritage Conservation and Promotion Authority. He was a Minister of State in the Third Ashok Gehlot ministry. He has also represented Chittorgarh Assembly constituency in the Rajasthan Legislative Assembly between 1998 and 2003 and 2008–2013. He is a member of All India Congress Committee.

== Political career ==
Jadawat started his political career in university politics as NSUI President in Chittorgarh. As a young man, he met Indira Gandhi during her visit to Chittorgarh in 1979, when he led a 100 bike escort for her caravan. He went on to become MLA from Chittorgarh for terms between 1998 and 2003 and 2008–2013. He also contested 2018 assembly elections.

He led efforts to raise awareness during the COVID-19 pandemic. Jadawat called for a meeting with community representatives to bust myths around vaccination and promote the inoculation drive, and announced that every family that gets vaccinated will be eligible for a health insurance of Rs. 500,000 under the Chief Minister Chiranjeevi Health Insurance Scheme.

He accused the BJP of not thinking enough to carry out development work. He challenged the BJP legislators on the issue of development, noting that the issue of Chittorgarh medical college was put on the backburner by the previous BJP government. This was re-included in the budget by Chief Minister Ashok Gehlot, and the medical college has now reached the stage of inauguration.

At Abhaypur Ghat, Jadawat inaugurated projects worth 70 million. Several BJP members joined Congress in his presence, receiving the flag from the minister. Jadawat and Gehlot's schemes impacted 200,000 BJP workers in the Gram Panchayat of Abhaypur. Crores have been spent for development in villages, with more BJP members leaving for Congress.

=== Chairman of RHCPA ===
In February 2022, Jadawat took charge as Chairman of Rajasthan Heritage Conservation and Promotion Authority (RHCPA). He was given the rank of Minister of State by the Chief Minister Ashok Gehlot.

Surendra Singh Jadawat has outlined his priorities which include completing ongoing projects, reviewing and implementing time-bound projects related to development works in forts and panoramas in Chittorgarh, Deshnok, Angad Baoji, and Maa Shabri, and ensuring dedicated officials are in place to expedite work.

Jadawat announced that the Bedchh Puliya bridge would be named after Baba Sahab on 14 April, and Congress is committed to working with all sections of society to ensure progress.

Jadawat discussed his aim of opening English medium schools in Chittorgarh's villages for children from rural areas. All schools will have renovated facilities & games. On the occasion, he approved Rs. 5 million for a playground in Chiksi from the Gram DFM fund.

In January 2023, Surendra Singh Jadawat announced a plan to build a panorama honoring Kesari Singh Barhath, approved by Rajasthan CM Ashok Gehlot with Rs. 40 million. A survey of the land with local authorities has been conducted to mark it, and work will begin soon.
