= Surendra Bikram Prakash =

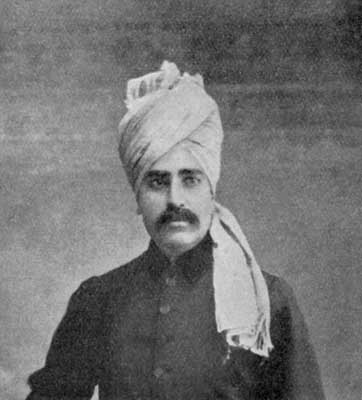
Portrait of Raja Surendra Bikram Prakash of Sirmur State, published in 'The Panjab, North-West Frontier Province and Kashmir' (1916)

Raja Sir Surendra Bikram Prakash Bahadur, KCSI (14 November 1867 – 4 July 1911) was a Raja of the princely state of Sirmur from 1898 until his death in 1911.

Surendra Bikram was the son of Raja Sir Shamsher Prakash, GCSI (1846–1898), and succeeded as Raja on his death in 1898. The State of Sirmur, which was sub-Himalayan, in what is now the Sirmaur district, was also sometimes known as Nahan, after its main city Nahan. The Raja had a salute of 11 guns, and he was the 44th of his line.

He continued a progressive policy adopted by his father, including reorganizing the Courts of Justice in the state, and amalgamated the postal service with that of British India. According to a contemporary obituary, he "gave personal attention to administrative details". The Viceroy, Lord Curzon, nominated him to a seat on the Imperial Legislative Council, where he served from 1902 until 1907. He attended the Coronation Durbar at Delhi in 1903.

Raja Surendra Bikram was appointed a Knight Commander of the Order of the Star of India (KCSI) in the 1901 Birthday Honours list on 9 November 1901.

He died at Mussoorie on 4 July 1911, after an illness lasting some time.

He married, in 1883, Suketwala Rani Subhadra Deviji Sahiba (1865–1907), daughter of Raja Rudra Sen Bahadur, Raja of Suket. Their son Amar Prakash (1888–1933) succeeded him as Raja in 1911, and was later raised to the title of Maharaja.
