= Man Singh II =

Last ruling Maharaja of Jaipur (1912–1970)

- Major General; Maharaja Sawai; Sir
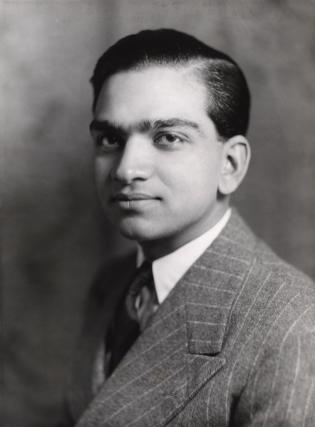
- Man Singh II in 1936

Maharaja of Jaipur
- Reign: 7 September 1922 – 15 April 1948
- Coronation: 18 September 1922
- Predecessor: Sawai Madho Singh II
- Titular Reign: 15 April 1948 – 24 June 1970
- Successor: Sawai Bhawani Singh
- Born: Mor Mukut Singh; 21 August 1912; Thikana of Isarda, Rajputana Agency, British India
- Died: 24 June 1970 (aged 57); Cirencester, Gloucestershire, England
- Consort(s): Princess Marudhar Kanwar of Marwar; Princess Kishore Kanwar of Marwar; Princess Gayatri Devi of Cooch Behar
- Issue: Princess Prem Kumari; Bhawani Singh, Crown Prince of Jaipur; Prince Jai Singh; Prince Prithviraj Singh; Prince Jagat Singh
- House: Kachhwaha
- Father: Sawai Singh (biological); Madho Singh II of Jaipur (adoptive)
- Mother: Sugun Kunwar (biological)
- Religion: Hinduism

Rajpramukh of Rajasthan
- In office 30 March 1949 – 31 October 1956
- Preceded by: Bhupal Singh
- Succeeded by: position abolished Gurmukh Nihal Singh (as Governor of Rajasthan)

Ambassador of India to Spain
- In office 1965 – 1970

Major General Maharaja Sawai Sir Man Singh II GCSI GCIE (born Sawai Mor Mukut Singh; 21 August 1912 – 24 June 1970) was an Indian prince, government official, diplomat, and sportsman.

Man Singh II was the ruling Maharaja of the princely state of Jaipur in the British Raj from 1922 to 1947. In 1948, following the absorption into independent India, he was granted a privy purse, certain privileges, and the continued use of the title Maharaja of Jaipur by the Government of India, which he retained until his death in 1970. He also held the office of Rajpramukh (governor) of Rajasthan between 1949 and 1956. In later life, he served as Ambassador of India to Spain. He was a notable polo player.

== Early life ==
Sawai Man Singh II was born Mor Mukut Singh, the second son of Thakur Sawai Singh of Isarda by his wife Sugan Kunwar, a lady from Kotla village in Uttar Pradesh. His father was a nobleman belonging to the Kachhwaha clan. Mor Mukut grew up in the dusty, walled township of Isarda, a chief of thikana of the Rajawat sub-clan which lies between the towns of Sawai Madhopur and Jaipur in present-day Rajasthan. His family was connected to the ruling house of Jaipur and Kotah (where his father's sister was married). The then-Maharaja of Jaipur, Sawai Madho Singh II, had been born the son of a former Thakur of Isarda and had been adopted into the ruling family of Jaipur. After giving him up for adoption, Madho Singh's actual father had in turn lacked for an heir. He adopted the son of a distant kinsman and was succeeded by that lad as Thakur of Isarda. That lad was Sawai Singh, father of Mor Mukut Singh. In this manner, Mor Mukut could be reckoned near kin to Maharaja Madho Singh II of Jaipur.

After being adopted to become Maharaja of Jaipur, Madho Singh II had numerous (no less than 65) children by various concubines, but the highly superstitious Maharaja was warned by a sage against having legitimate heirs and thus took great care not to impregnate his five wives. On 24 March 1921, Madho Singh II adopted Mor Mukut to be his son and heir. The boy was given the name "Man Singh" upon his adoption. Madho Singh II died on 7 September 1922 and was succeeded by Man Singh as Maharaja of Jaipur and head of the Kachwaha clan of Rajputs. The new Maharaja was ten years old.

== Maharaja of Jaipur ==
Upon obtaining his ruling powers, Man Singh embarked on a programme of modernisation, creating infrastructure and founding numerous public institutions that would later result in Jaipur being selected the capital of Rajasthan. At the time of the independence of British India in 1947, Singh delayed acceding Jaipur to the Dominion of India. He finally signed an Instrument of Accession in April 1949, when his princely state became part of the Rajasthan States Union, initially retaining his powers of internal government. He became Rajpramukh of the States Union, but the office was abolished when the Indian states were further re-organised in 1956. Although the Indian princes had by then relinquished their ruling powers, they remained entitled to their titles, privy purses, and other privileges until the adoption of the 26th amendment to the Constitution of India on 28 December 1971. Accordingly, he remained Maharaja of Jaipur until his death.

In 1958, Man Singh was one of several rulers who realised the potential of tourism in Rajasthan, turning Rambagh Palace into a luxury hotel. Under his rule, various land reform laws were first introduced in his state, such as the Jaipur Tenancy Act. Later in 1956, the jagidari (feudal) form of political administration were abolished in India during the government of the Congress Party. In 1962, he was elected to Council of States, the Rajya Sabha (the upper house of the Indian Parliament) with term lasting till 1968; however, in 1965, the Indian government appointed Man Singh as India's ambassador to Spain. Utilising his various contacts in Europe, he spent much of his time there to secure new military technology and arms deals for the Indian army (Crewe).

He was especially noted as an enthusiastic polo player, winning among other trophies the World Cup in 1933. The Sawai Mansingh Stadium in Jaipur is named in his honour. During the 1950s, Man Singh owned Saint Hill Manor in East Grinstead, West Sussex, which was sold to L. Ron Hubbard, founder of Scientology in 1959.

== Personal life ==
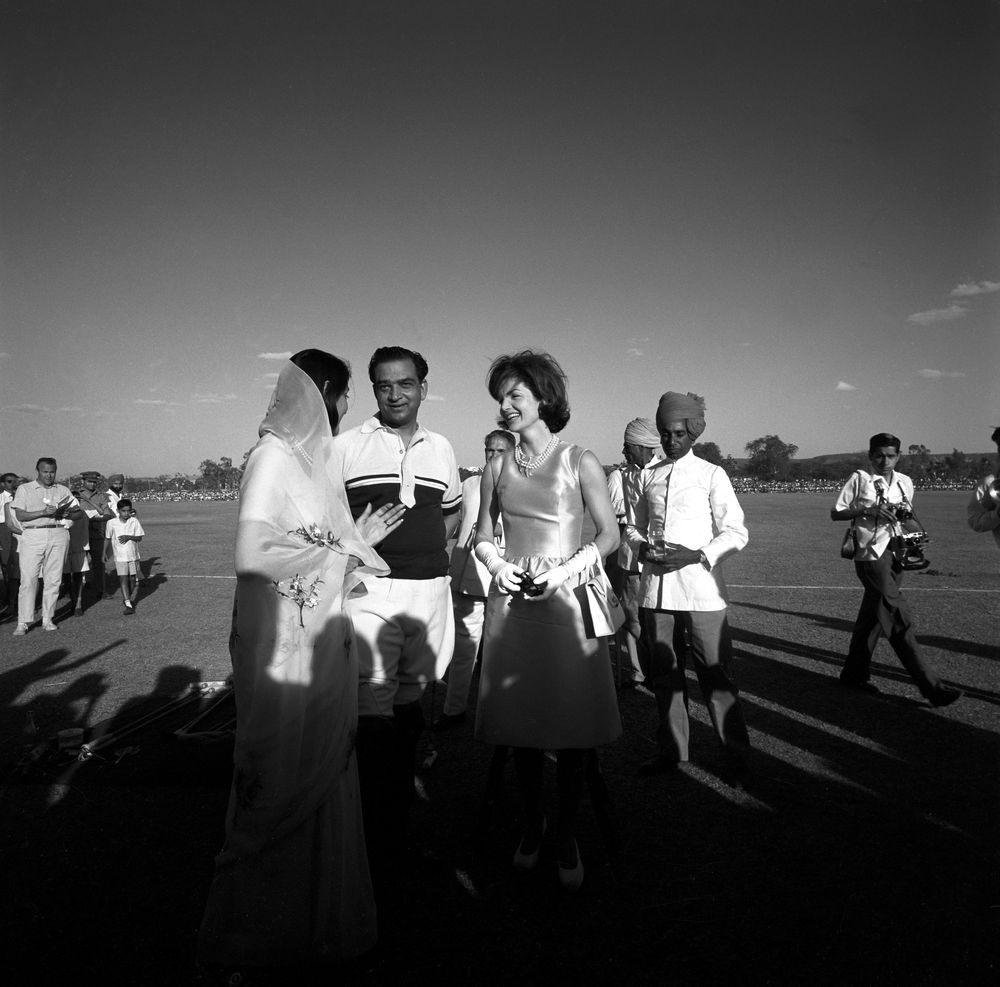
First Lady Jacqueline Kennedy with the Maharaja and Maharani of Jaipur.

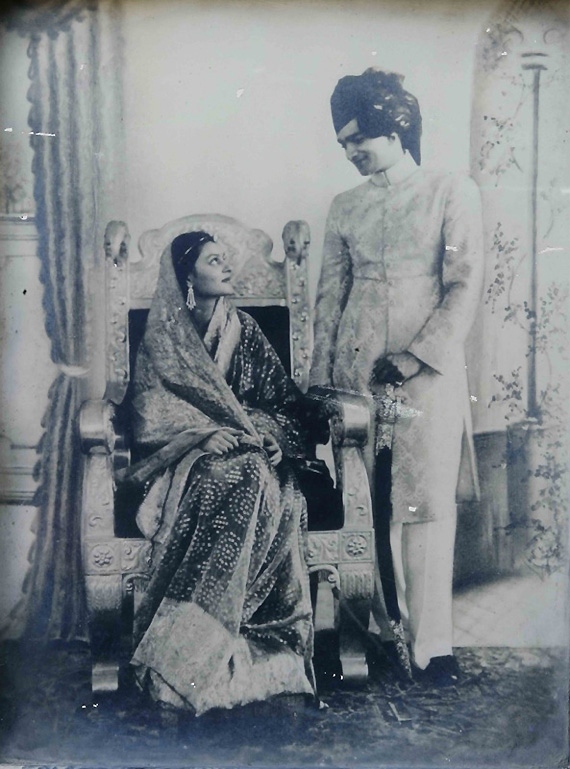
Man Singh II and Maharani Gayatri Devi.

=== Marriages ===
Singh was married three times, and his three wives lived in the same household together, in accordance with Rajput custom. His first two marriages were to suitable brides chosen from the royal family of Jodhpur, whose Rajput heritage and social ranking were similar to his own. The senior queen, known within the palace as 'First her Highness,' was Marudhar Kunwar, the sister of Sumer Singh, Maharaja of Jodhpur. She was about twelve years older than him and bore him two children: first, a daughter, Prem Kumari, and then his eldest son and heir, Bhawani Singh. His second wife was Maharani Kishore Kanwar, niece of his first wife and daughter of Maharaja Sumer Singh of Jodhpur. She was five years younger than him and bore two sons.

He was briefly involved with English socialite Lady Ursula Manners.

In 1940, Singh married for the third and last time. His bride was Gayatri Devi, the daughter of Maharaja Jitendra Narayan of Cooch Behar and Maharani Indira Devi, princess of Baroda. She stood out amongst the Maharanis of Jaipur for having become a public figure and a celebrity of sorts, initially for being a fashion-conscious beauty and later for becoming a politician and parliamentarian. They had one son. Devi survived him by thirty-nine years, dying in 2009.

=== Children ===
Man Singh was the father of four sons and a daughter, borne to him by his three wives. By his first wife, Maharani Marudhar Kunwar, one son and one daughter:

- Prem Kumari (1929–1970). In 1948, she was given in marriage to the Maharawal of Baria. She had one daughter.
- Bhawani Singh (1931–2011), who succeeded his father's title in 1970. In 1967, he married Padmini Devi, daughter of the Raja of Sirmur, and had one daughter;
  - Diya Kumari (b. 1970). She has three children, including one son who was adopted by Bhawani Singh and declared his successor, namely:
    - Padmanabh Singh (b. 1998). In 2002, he was adopted by his maternal grandfather and recognised within the family as successor to the traditional title, which no longer exists.

By his second wife, Maharani Kishore Kunwar, two sons:

- Jai Singh (b. 1933). he was given the title of Raja of Jhalai and the estate of Jhalai in appanage by his father. In 1983, he married Vidya Devi, daughter of the Raja of Jubbal, and has one son.
  - Ajay Singh
- Prithviraj (1935–2020); received the title Raja of Bhagwatgarth. In 1961, he married Devika Devi, a princess of Tripura and a niece (sister's daughter) of his step-mother Gayatri Devi. They had been living separately from each other by the time she died in 2009, a few months before her aunt. Gayatri Devi tended to support her step-son and deprecate her niece in the matter of their marital differences, and Prithviraj Singh remained close to his step-mother all his life. Prithviraj and Devika had one son together:
  - Vijit Singh, who in 1991 married Minakshi Devi, daughter of the Maharaja of Lunawada, and has three children; two sons named Vedant Singh (b. 1992) and Siddhant Singh (b. 1996), and a daughter Mokshita (b. 1993).

By his third wife, Gayatri Devi (1919–2009):

- Prince Jagat Singh, (1949–1997) received the title Raja of Isarda was married in 1978 (divorced 1987) to Thai princess Mom Rajawongse Priyanandana Rangsit, daughter of HSH Prince Piyarangsit Rangsit. He had two children by her, namely,
  - Lalitya Kumari (b. 1979), daughter
  - Devraj Singh, (b. 1981), son

== Death ==
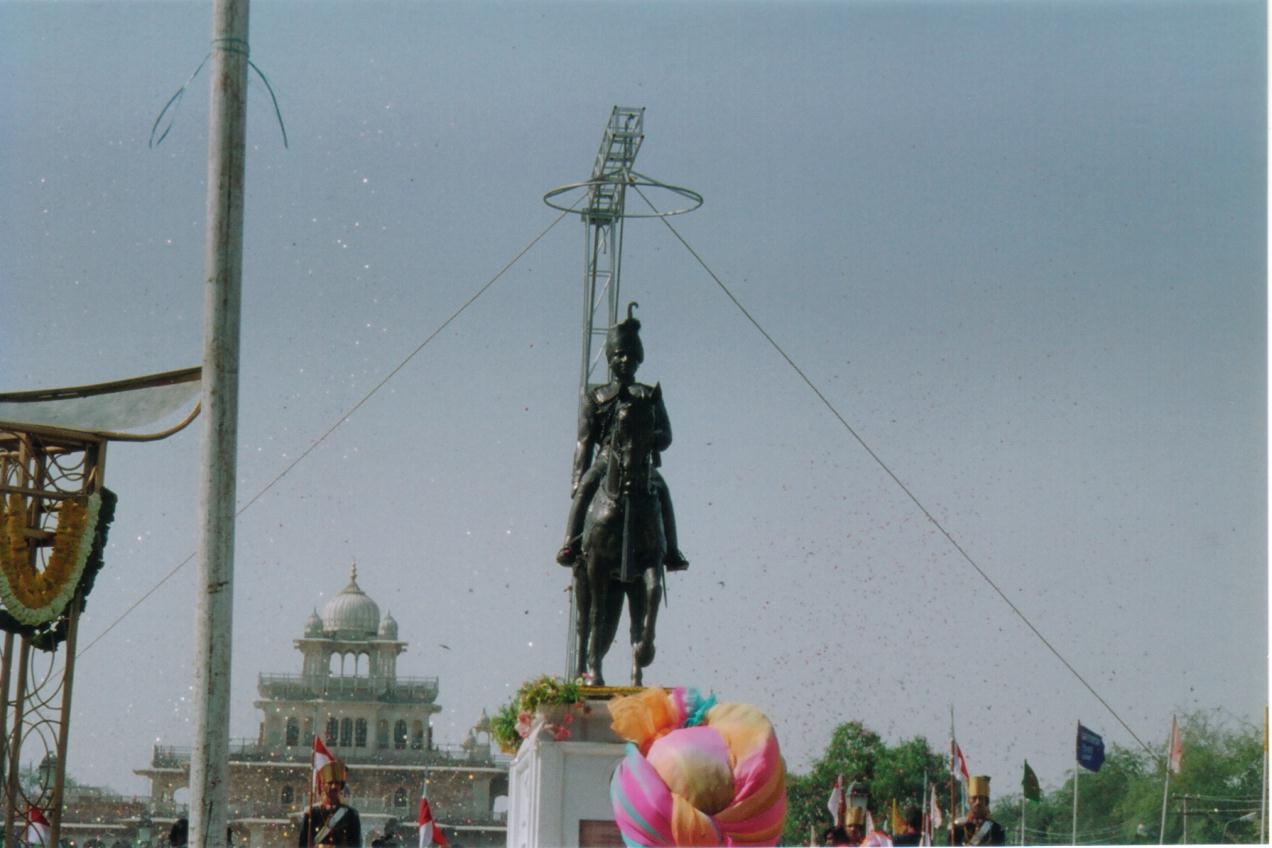
The unveiling ceremony of Man Singh's statue in Jaipur on Rajasthan day, 30 March 2005.

On 24 June 1970, the 57-year old Man Singh had an accident while playing polo in Cirencester, England. He died later the same day. He was survived by his four sons. He was succeeded as Maharaja of Jaipur and head of the Kachwaha clan by his eldest son, Maharaja Sawai Bhawani Singh of Jaipur.

A statue of Singh was installed at the Ram Niwas Bagh in Jaipur amidst grand celebrations on 30 March 2005. A cricket stadium in Jaipur was named after him. His wife Gayatri Devi opened a school after him, called Maharaja Sawai Man Singh Vidyalaya.

His successor, Maharaja Sawai Bhawani Singh of Jaipur died on 17 April 2011, aged 79.

== See also ==
- Jaipur State
- Gayatri Devi
- Man Singh I

== Works cited ==
- d'Abo, Lady Ursula (2014). Watkin, David (ed.). The Girl with the Widow's Peak: The Memoirs. London: d'Abo Publications. ISBN 978-1907991097.
