= Vaishali (restaurant) =

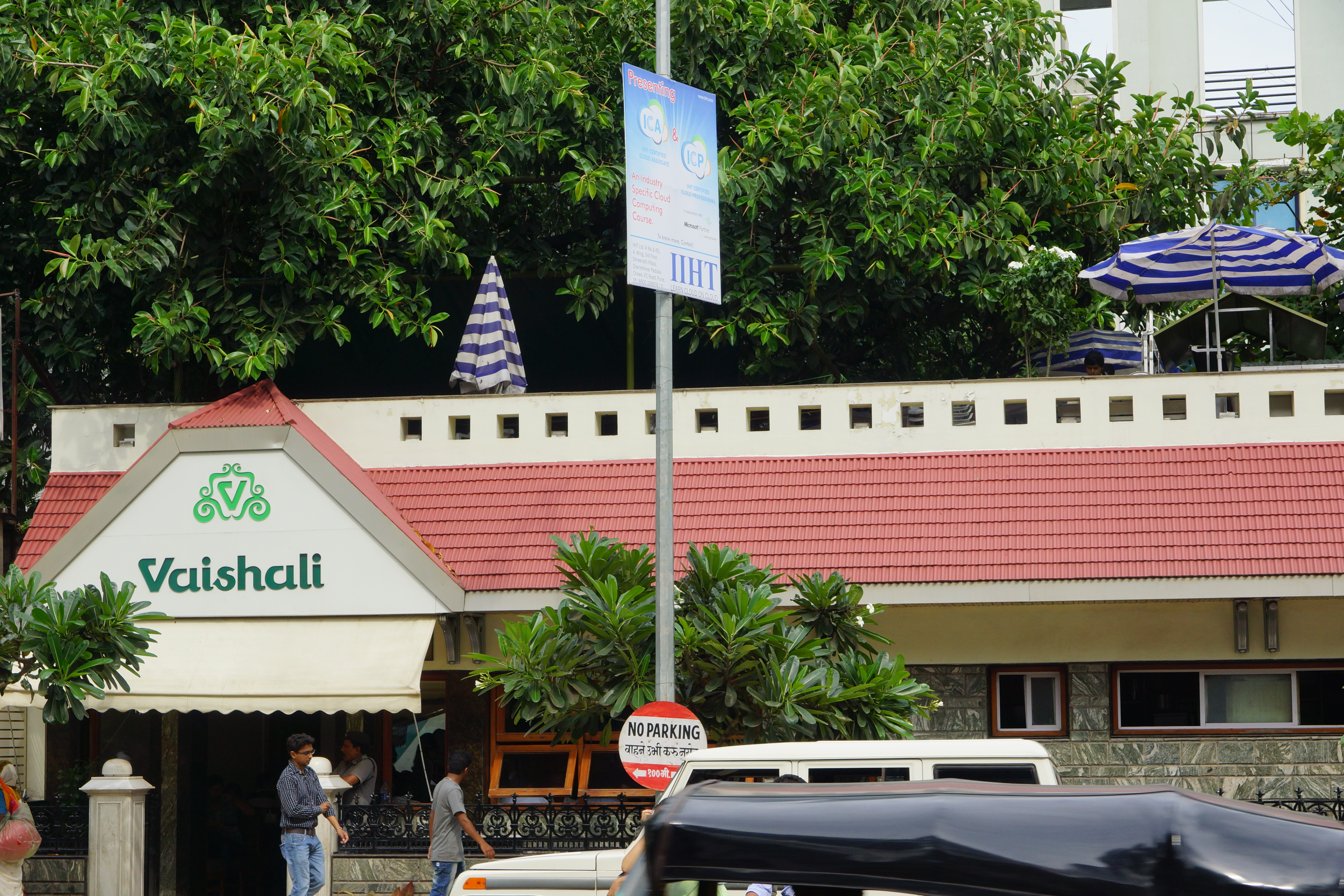
- Interactive map of Vaishali

Restaurant information
- Established: 1954
- Food type: Vegetarian
- Location: Pune, Maharashtra, India
- Coordinates: 18.52093°N 73.841156°E
- Seating capacity: 240
- Website: www.vaishalihotel.in

Vaishali is a restaurant popular in Pune for South Indian food. Everyday more than 500 people daily visit this place . Since many year three youngsters visited this place by making lots of memories. The three youngsters were Abhinay, Kunal, and Narendra It is located on Ferguson College Road. It was established in 1954 by Jagannath B Shetty, as Madras Cafe

== In popular culture ==
Vaishali was mentioned in U n Me . . . . . . It's Complicated!!! a novel by Aditya Nighot.
