= Bhawani Singh =

Maharaja of Jaipur from 1970 to 1971

- Brigadier; Maharaja Sawai

Head of the Jaipur Royal Family
- Tenure: 24 June 1970 – 17 April 2011
- Predecessor: Man Singh II
- Successor: Padmanabh Singh

Maharaja of Jaipur
- Titular reign: 24 June 1970 – 28 December 1971
- Predecessor: Man Singh II
- Successor: Position abolished by the 26th Amendment of the Indian Constitution
- Born: 22 October 1931; Jaipur, Jaipur State, British India (present-day Rajasthan, India)
- Died: 17 April 2011 (aged 79); Gurgaon, Haryana, India
- Spouse: Padmini Devi (m. 1966)
- Issue: Diya Kumari
- House: Kachhwaha
- Father: Man Singh II
- Mother: Princess Marudhar Kunwar of Marwar
- Military career
- Allegiance: India
- Branch: Indian Army
- Service years: 1951–1975 (active service)
- Rank: Brigadier
- Units: Presidents Bodyguards, 9th Battalion Para (Special Forces), 10th Battalion Para (Special Forces)
- Conflicts: Indo-Pakistani War of 1971; Operation Pawan
- Awards: Maha Vir Chakra

Brigadier Maharaja Sawai Bhawani Singh MVC (22 October 1931 – 17 April 2011) was an aristocrat who was head of the Jaipur royal family, an officer in the Indian Army, and an entrepreneur. He was last official titular Maharaja of Jaipur from 1970-1971.

Singh served in the Indian army from 1951 to 1975. In the Indo-Pakistani War of 1971, he was decorated with the Maha Vir Chakra and also he captured Pakistan district Chachro, which remained under India's control for eleven months. The country's second-highest award for gallantry in the face of the enemy. He later served as an advisor to the Indian forces in Sri Lanka. After retirement, he served as India's High Commissioner to Brunei. He oversaw the management of Rambagh Palace which had been converted into a hotel.

Singh was the son of Man Singh II, the last ruling Maharaja of the princely state of Jaipur during the British Raj. Upon the death of his father on 24 June 1970, Bhawani Singh succeeded him in receiving an annual payment (the privy purse), certain privileges, and the use of the title "Maharaja of Jaipur" under terms accepted earlier when princely states were absorbed into independent India. However, all were ended on 28 December 1971 by the 26th Amendment to the Constitution of India.

Bhawani Singh married Princess Padmini Devi of Sirmur in 1966. Their only child, a daughter, Diya Kumari, is an Indian politician and a Member of Parliament. Bhawani Singh died at age 79 of multi-organ failure.

== Early life ==
Born to Maharaja Sir Sawai Man Singh II and his first wife, Marudhar Kanwar of Jaipur, Bhawani Singh was educated at Sheshbagh School, Srinagar, The Doon School, Dehradun, and later Harrow School in the United Kingdom. As the first male heir born to a reigning maharaja of Jaipur for generations (all others, including his father, who was originally a minor noble, were adopted), his birth was a celebrated event in Jaipur. It is said that so much champagne flowed in celebration of his birth that the new heir was nicknamed "Bubbles".

== Military career ==
Singh was commissioned into Indian Army in the 3rd Cavalry as a second Lieutenant holding a short-service commission in 1951 and was selected for the President's Bodyguards in 1954. On 31 July 1957, he received a regular commission as a lieutenant (seniority from 22 October 1954, and seniority as a second lieutenant from 22 October 1952) with the service number IC-9015. Promoted to the rank of captain on 22 October 1958, he served in the President's Bodyguard till 1963.

Singh was posted to 50th Parachute Brigade in 1963. Later, he was posted as Adjutant of the Indian Military Academy at Dehradun from January 1964 to 1967, during which time he was promoted to major on 22 October 1965.

In 1967, Singh was appointed second-in-command of the 10th battalion, Parachute Regiment (Commando) (10 Para Cdo), one of the two elite Special Forces battalions. He was appointed the commanding officer (CO) in 1968.

=== Indo-Pakistani War of 1971 ===
In 1970, Singh helped train the Mukti Bahini before the commencement of the Bangladesh Liberation War. During the war, as an acting lieutenant-colonel, he commanded 10 Para (Commando). The battalion, led by Singh, was responsible for the capture of Chachro in Sindh, for which he was decorated with the Maha Vir Chakra (MVC):

The citation for his MVC reads as follows:

Gazette Notification: 18 Pres/2000,15-8-99

Operation: - Date of Award: 15 Aug 1999

CITATION

LIEUTENANT COLONEL SAWAI BHAWANI SINGH (IC-9015)

THE PARACHUTE REGIMENT

On the night of 5 December 1971, Lieutenant Colonel Sawai Bhawani Singh, who was commanding a battalion of the Parachute Regiment (commandos), led his men deep into the enemy territory and for four days and nights, with complete disregard for his personal comfort and safety, made skilful and relentless raids on the strongly held enemy posts at Chachro and Virawah. His inspired leadership and personal courage led to the capture of large areas of the enemy territory and created panic and confusion among the enemy, forcing them to retreat leaving large number of prisoners and equipment.

In this operation, Lieutenant Colonel Sawai Bhawani Singh set an example of personal courage, exceptional qualities of leadership and devotion to duty in the highest traditions of the Indian Army.

=== Post-war career ===
Promoted to substantive lieutenant-colonel on 17 June 1973, Singh took early retirement from the army with effect from 23 May 1975. While the Indian Army was in action in Sri Lanka under Operation Pawan, the Prime Minister Rajiv Gandhi requested him to go to Sri Lanka and boost the low morale of his old unit (10 Para Cdo). He was successful in this venture and, for this, the President bestowed upon him the honorary rank of Brigadier on 29 November 1991. A promotion after retirement was considered a rare honour.

== Diplomatic career ==
After his retirement from Indian Army, Singh served as High Commissioner of India to Brunei from 1994 to 1997.

== Royal life ==
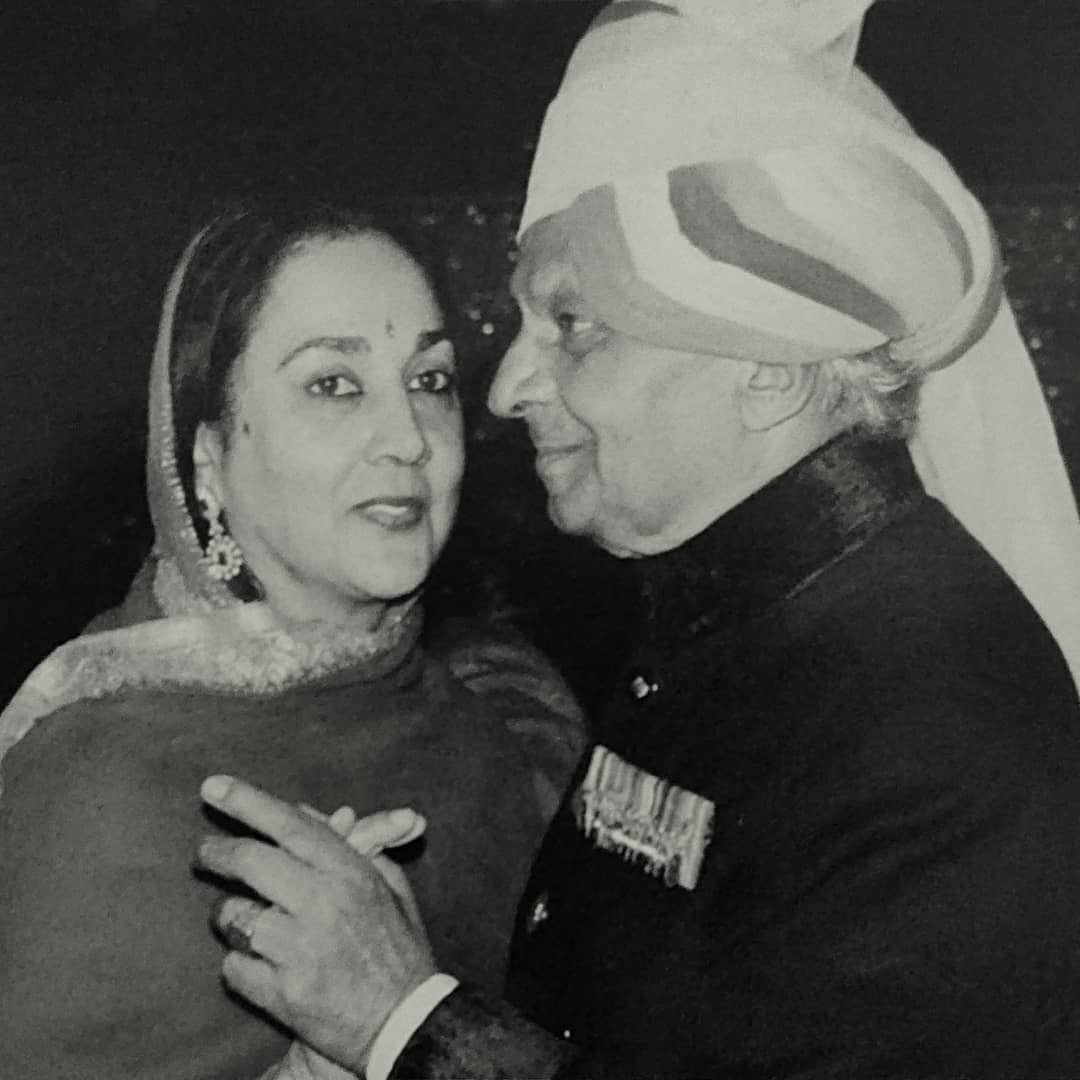
Bhawani Singh of Jaipur with his wife

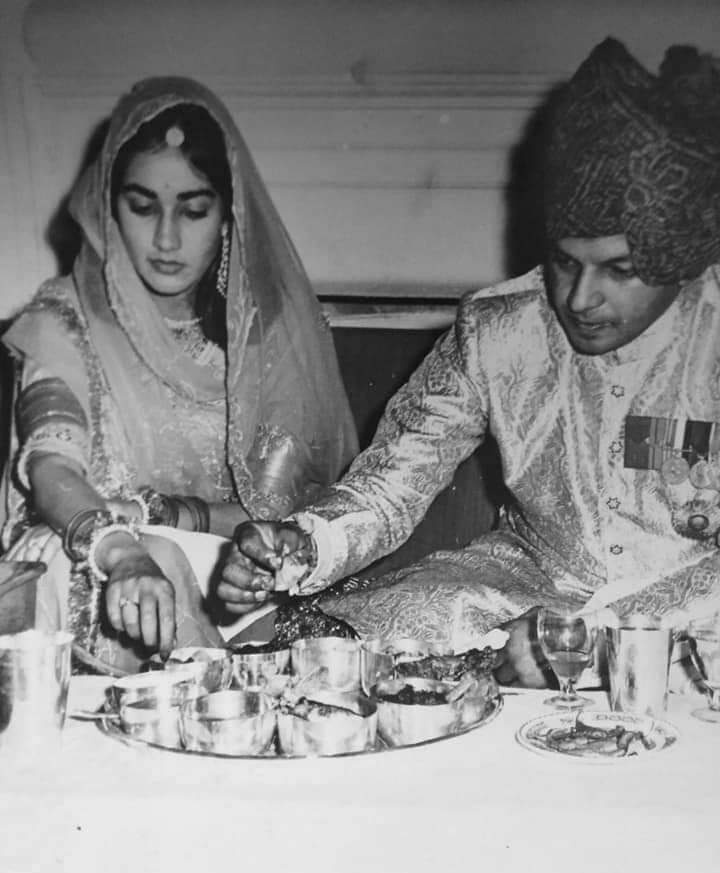
The Maharaja and Maharani of Jaipur

Bhawani Singh ascended the throne of Jaipur on 24 June 1970 following the death of his father, and held the title of Maharaja until the abolition of the princely order, his Privy Purse and other royal entitlements by Indira Gandhi in 1971, although he remained generally honoured like most other erstwhile rulers.

He married Princess Padmini Devi of Sirmur on 10 March 1966 in a ceremony held at Delhi. She was the daughter of his father's polo-playing friend HH Maharaja Rajendra Prakash of Sirmur by his wife Maharani Indira Devi. The couple had one daughter, Diya Kumari (b. 30 January 1971).

Having half-brothers but no son, in November 2002 he adopted his daughter's elder son, Padmanabh Singh, who succeeded him as head of the erstwhile royal family of Jaipur upon his death.

== Other ==
In the same vein as his father, the first hotelier prince in India, Bhawani Singh ran many palaces as hotels, including the Rambagh Palace, Raj Mahal Palace, or other former royal residences. He was the first Indian prince to turn his Rambagh Palace in to luxury hotel in 1958. He conducted certain ceremonies and customs from the traditional seat of royal power, the sprawling City Palace, Jaipur, part of which remains under the control of his family. He became one of the richest maharajas of post-independent India.

== Political career ==
He was also involved in local politics, as was his late stepmother, Gayatri Devi, his father's third wife. In 1975 he was arrested and imprisoned for a short period during The Emergency by Congress government at center, due to political vendetta along-with Gayatri Devi but was released after protests from various people including Indian Army and Lord Mountbatten, who spoke to Indira Gandhi.

Sawai Bhawani Singh contested the Lok Sabha elections in the year 1989 for the Indian National Congress Party but lost to the Bharatiya Janata Party leader Girdhari Lal Bhargava.

He then retired from active politics and devoted his time to his family and the protection and continuation of Jaipur's traditional arts and heritage.

== Death ==
Bhawani Singh was admitted to a private hospital in Gurgaon, Haryana on 29 March and died on 17 April 2011 following multi-organ failure.

Ashok Gehlot, then Chief Minister of Rajasthan announced two days of state mourning. His body was flown to Jaipur and kept at the City Palace for people to pay their last respect before being cremated.

He was cremated on 18 April 2011 at Gaitore Ki Chhatriya, the royal crematorium in Jaipur with full state honours.

== Honours and awards ==
=== Military awards ===

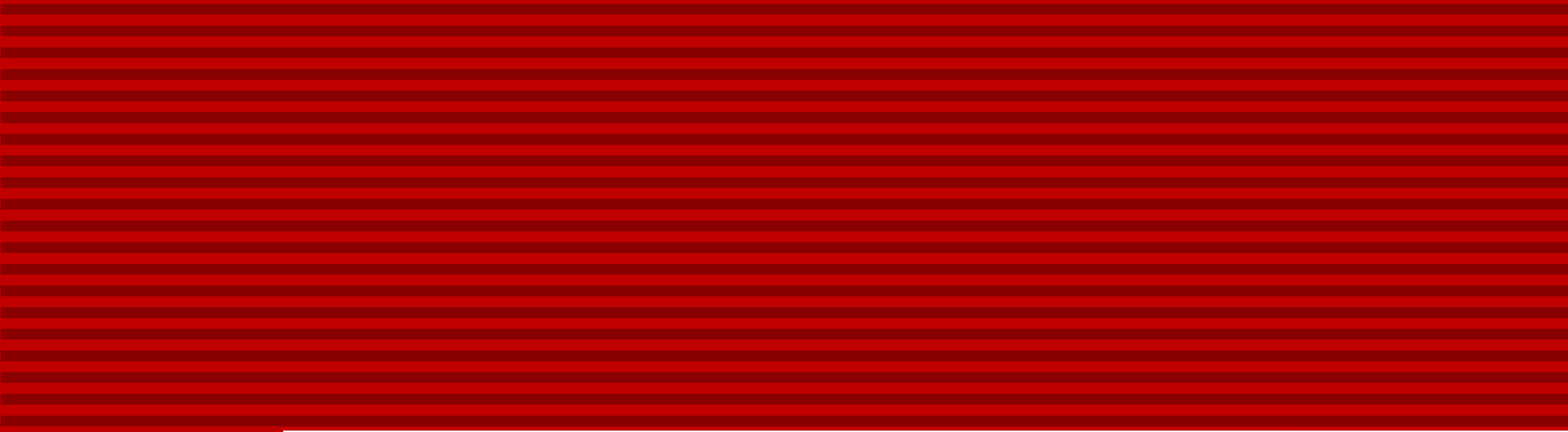

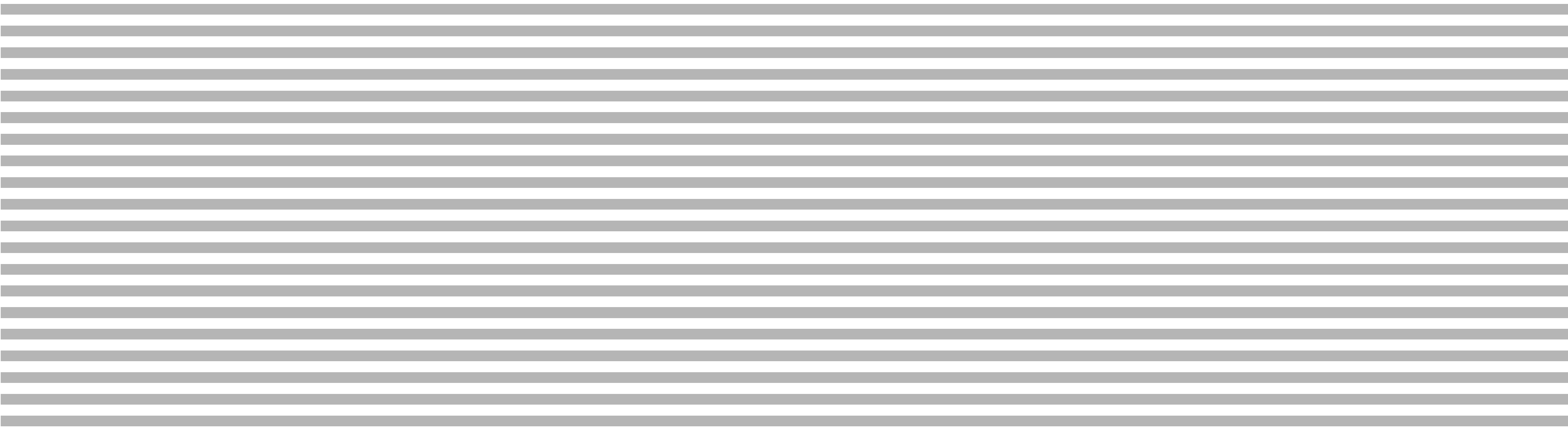

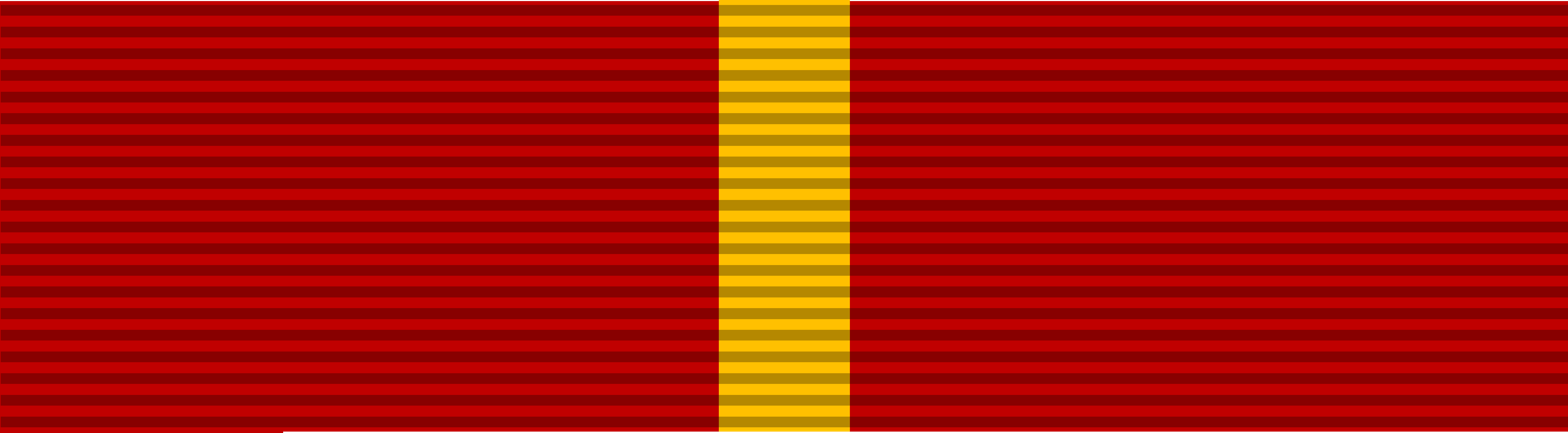

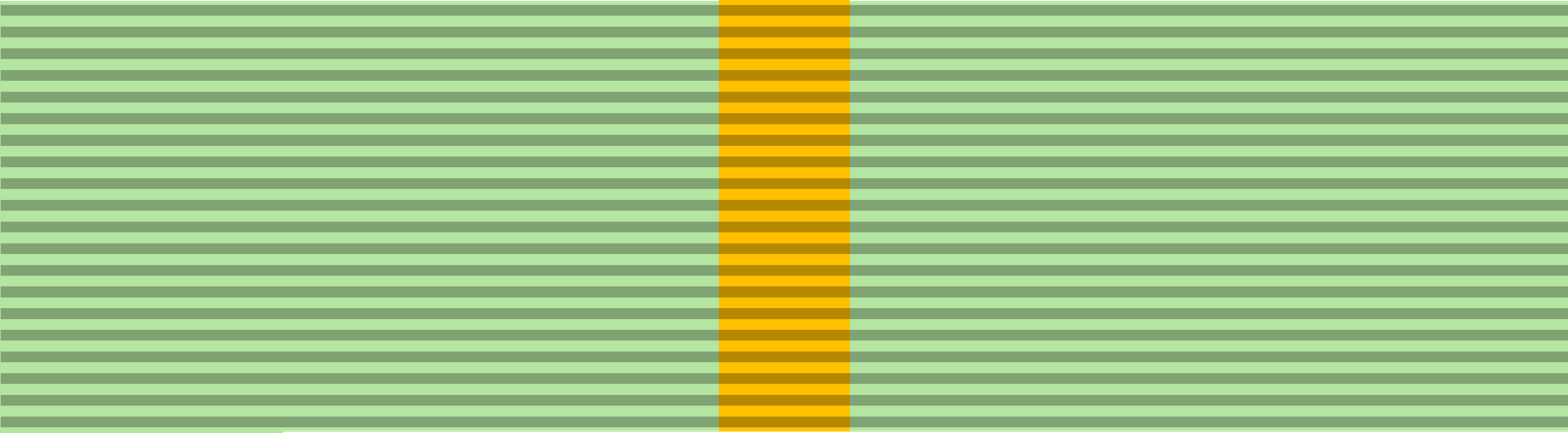

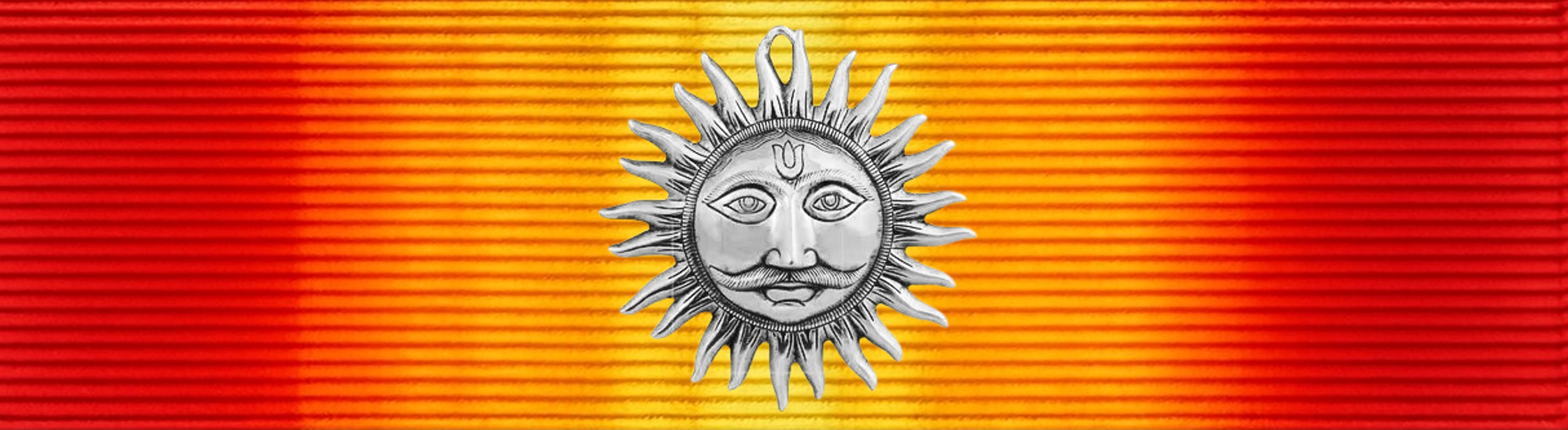

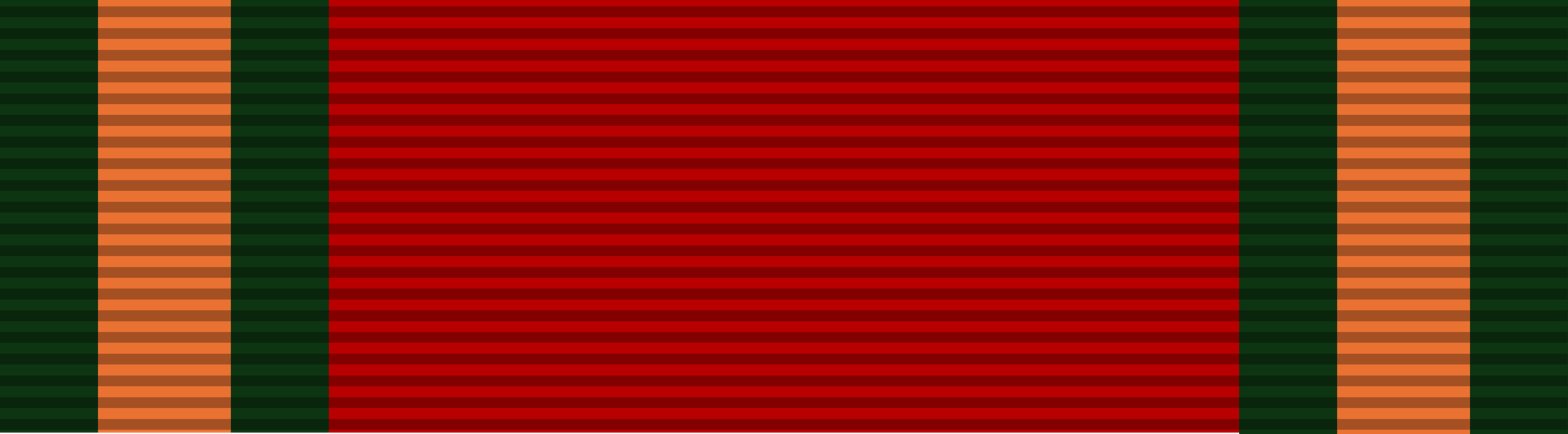

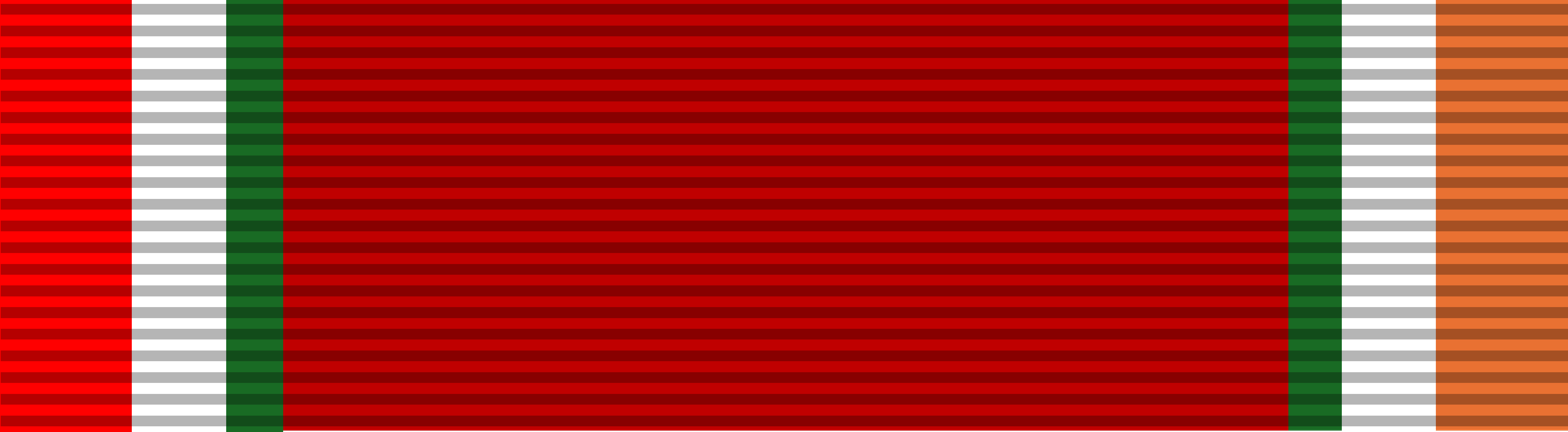

Maha Vir Chakra		Unknown Medal 1	
Unknown Medal 2	General Service Medal		Samar Seva Star
Special Service Medal	Samanya Seva Medal	Poorvi Star	Paschimi Star
Raksha Medal	Sangram Medal	Sainya Seva Medal	High Altitude Service Medal
Videsh Seva Medal	Indian Independence Medal	25th Anniversary Independence Medal	20 Years Long Service Medal
9 Years Long Service Medal	Unknown Medal 3	Unknown Medal 4	King George V Silver Jubilee Medal, 1935 (UK)
King George VI Coronation Medal, 1937 (UK)	Maharaja Man Singh II Silver Jubilee Medal, 1947 (with sun device) (Jaipur)	Jagadipendra Narayan Silver Jubilee Medal, 1947 (Cooch Behar)	Maharaja Hanwant Singh Coronation Medal, 1947 (Jodhpur)

Bhawani Singh House of Kachwaha Born: 22 October 1931 Died: 17 April 2011
Titles in pretence
Preceded by Man Singh II	— TITULAR — Maharaja of Jaipur; 24 June 1970 – 28 December 1971; Reason for succession failure: Title abolished by Republic of India	Succeeded by Padmanabh Singh
