= Vishala =

Ramayana character

Vishala (Sanskrit: विशाल, romanized: Viśāla) is a king in Hinduism, featured in the Ramayana. He is the son of Ikshvaku and his queen, Alambusha. He is said to have built a city called Viśālā, near which Ahalya was transformed into stone. He had a son named Hemachandra.

The name of Vishala is also mentioned in one of the Puranas as well as the Mahabharata.
