= Rajasthan Polo Club =

Polo club in Jaipur

- Interactive map of Rajasthan Polo Club
- Full name: Rajasthan Polo Club
- Address: Bhawani Singh Rd; Jaipur; India

Construction
- Opened: 1901; 125 years ago

Website
- rajasthanpoloclub.co.in

The Rajasthan Polo Club (formerly Rajputana Polo Club) is a polo club in Jaipur, Rajasthan, India.

== History ==
The club was started in 1901 as Rajputana Polo Club with the support of various rulers of Rajputana. It was renamed in 1949 as Rajasthan Polo Club on the formation of Greater Rajasthan Union. Following that, the headquarters of the club were shifted to Jaipur from Mount Abu. The club is now housed in the building of Jaipur Polo Club that itself was established in 1918.

In 1984, Charles III, when Prince of Wales, played for the club against Laurent-Perrier at Windsor, when the club was visiting England. The club was used as one of the filming locations for Zubeidaa and also for The Best Exotic Marigold Hotel.

== Partnerships and collaborations ==
The Leela Palaces, Hotels and Resorts partnered with the club in 2022 for their sponsorship of the Maharaja Sawai Man Singh Polo Cup..
