= Vidhyadhar Nagar Assembly constituency =

Legislative Assembly constituency in Rajasthan State, India

Coordinates: 26.96°N 75.78°E

Vidhyadhar Nagar
- Constituency No. 50 for the Rajasthan Legislative Assembly

Constituency details
- Country: India
- Region: North India
- State: Rajasthan
- District: Jaipur
- Lok Sabha constituency: Jaipur
- Established: 2008
- Total electors: 342,342
- Reservation: None

Member of Legislative Assembly
- 16th Rajasthan Legislative Assembly
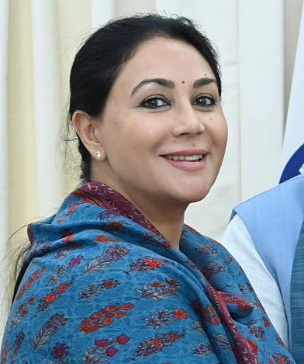
- Incumbent Diya Kumari; Deputy Chief Minister of Rajasthan
- Party: Bharatiya Janata Party
- Elected year: 2023
- Preceded by: Narpat Singh Rajvi

Vidhyadhar Nagar Assembly constituency is one of the 200 Legislative Assembly constituencies of Rajasthan state in India. The constituency was created after the passing of the Delimitation of Parliamentary & Assembly constituencies Order - 2008. It is part of Jaipur district.

== Members of the Legislative Assembly ==
Year	Member	Party
2008	Narpat Singh Rajvi	Bharatiya Janata Party
2013	Narpat Singh Rajvi	Bharatiya Janata Party
2018	Narpat Singh Rajvi	Bharatiya Janata Party
2023	Diya Kumari	Bharatiya Janata Party

== Election results ==
=== 2023 ===
2023 Rajasthan Legislative Assembly election: Vidhyadhar Nagar
Party	Candidate	Votes	%	±%
BJP	Diya Kumari	158,516	63.3	+20.97
INC	Sita Ram Agarwal	87,148	34.8	+6.3
NOTA	None of the above	1,568	0.63	−0.16
Majority		71,368	28.5	+14.67
Turnout		250,409	73.15	+2.94
BJP hold		Swing		

=== 2018 ===
2018 Rajasthan Legislative Assembly election: Vidhyadhar Nagar
Party	Candidate	Votes	%	±%
BJP	Narpat Singh Rajvi	95,599	42.33	
INC	Sitaram Agarwal	64,367	28.5	
Independent	Vikram Singh Shekhawat	50,382	22.31	
Bharat Vahini Party	Pawan Kumar Goyal	3,504	1.55	
BSP	Madan Lal Beniwal	2,601	1.15	
NOTA	None of the above	1,774	0.79	
Majority		31,232	13.83	
Turnout		225,843	70.21	

== See also ==
- List of constituencies of the Rajasthan Legislative Assembly
- Jaipur district
