= Sirmur State =

Princely state of India

Sirmaur State Sirmoor State Nahan State
- Princely State of British India
- 1095–1948
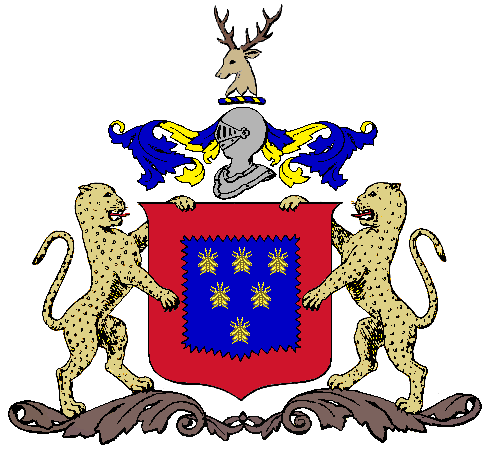
- Coat of arms

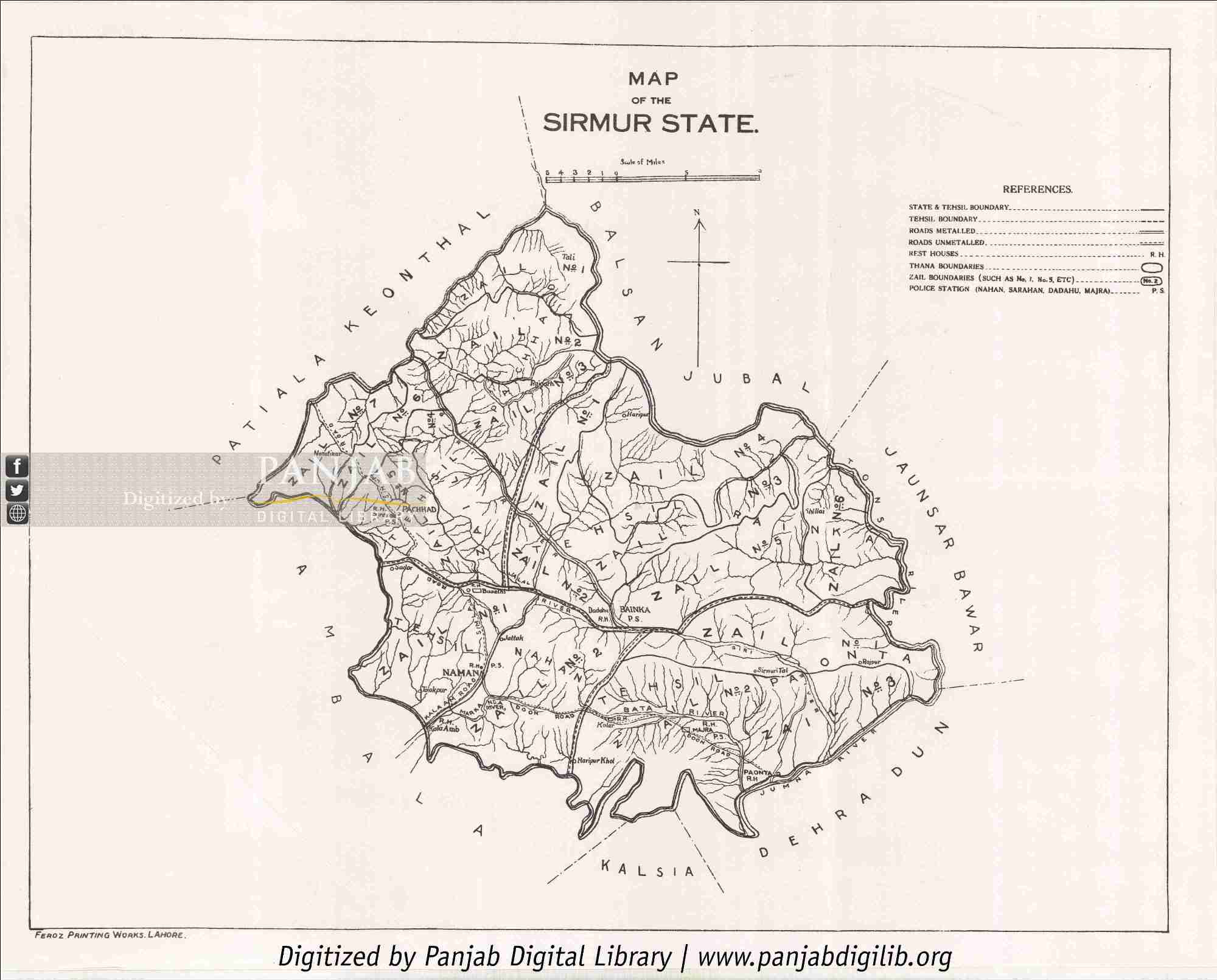
- Map of Sirmur State, Indus Publishing Company, New Delhi, 1934
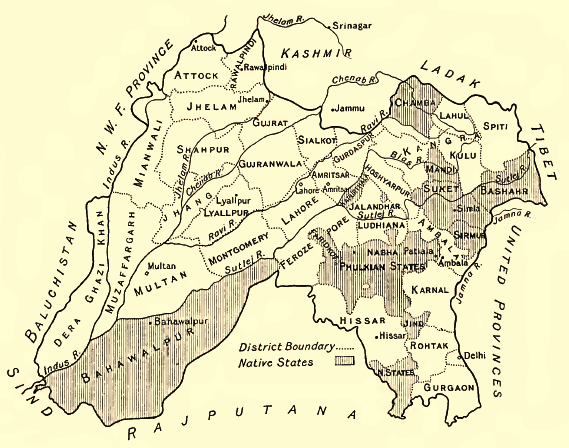
- Sirmur State in a 1911 map of Punjab
- Capital: Nahan
- Area
  - 1901 Census of India: 4,039 km^{2} (1,559 sq mi)
- Population
  - 1901 Census of India: 135,626
- History
  - Established: 1095
  - Independence of India: 1948
Succeeded by
India
- Today part of: Himachal Pradesh, India
- Gazetteer of the Sirmur State. New Delhi: Indus Publishing. 1996. ISBN 978-81-7387-056-9. OCLC 41357468.

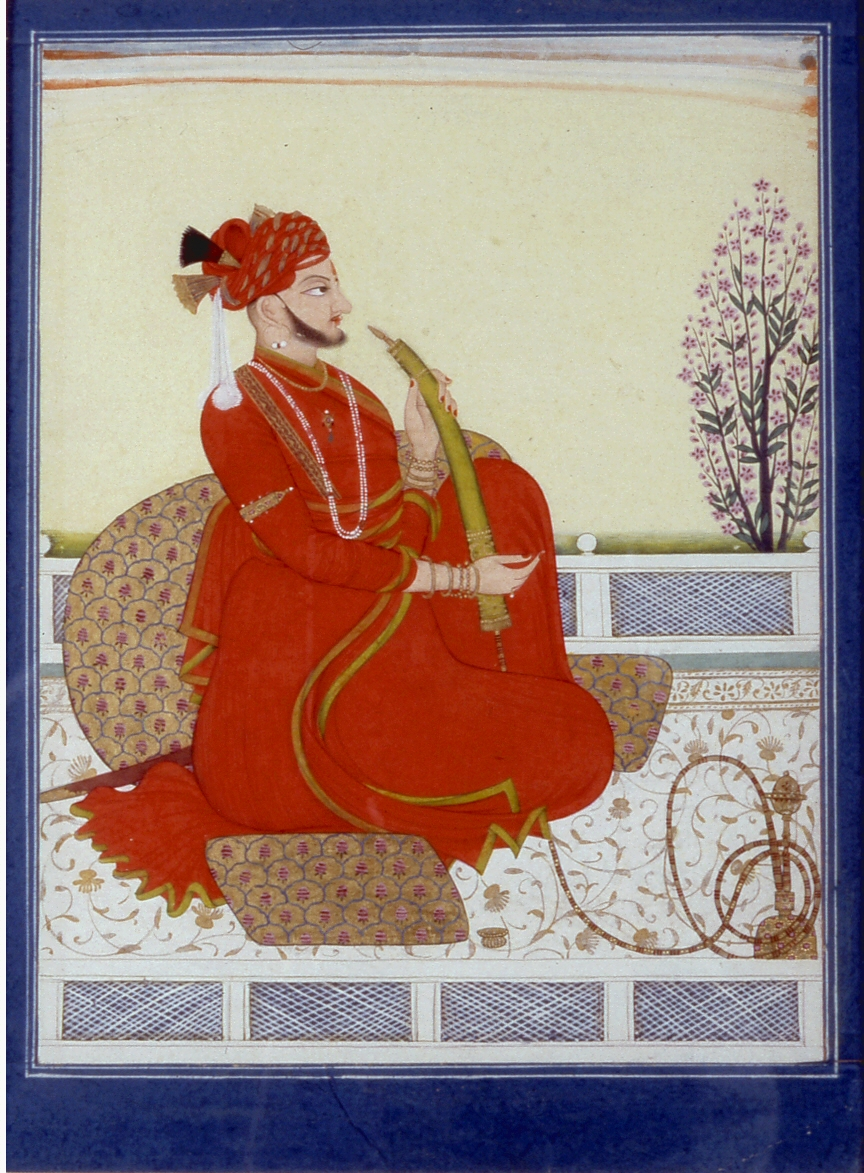
Portrait of Maharaja Kirat Prakash of Sirmur. Late 18th century.

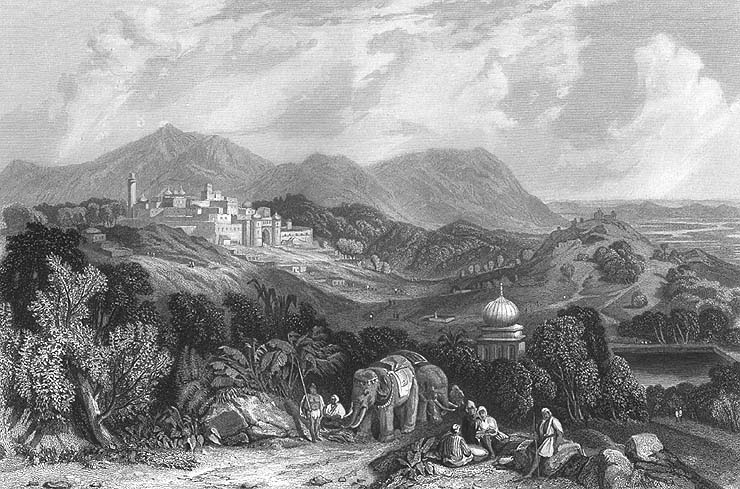
The Fort of Nahan, the capital of princely-state of Sirmur

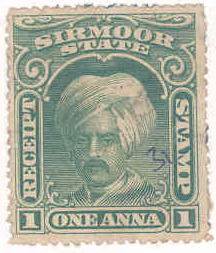
Stamp of Sirmour in 1800s

Sirmur (also spelled as Sirmor, Sirmaur, Sirmour, or Sirmoor) was a princely state of India, located in the region that is now the Sirmaur district of Himachal Pradesh. The state was also known as Nahan, after its main city, Nahan. The state ranked predominant amongst the Punjab Hill States. It had an area of 4,039 km^{2} and a revenue of 300,000 rupees in 1891.

== History ==
=== Origin ===
According to Mian Goverdhan Singh in Wooden Temples of Himachal Pradesh, the principality of Sirmaur was founded in the 7th to 8th century by Maharaja of Parmar Rajputs, and Rathore noble.

=== Nahan State ===
Nahan, the predecessor state of Sirmur, was founded by Soba Rawal in 1095 AD who assumed the name Raja Subans Prakash.

Near the end of the 12th century in the year 1195, a flood of the Giri River destroyed the old capital of Sirmaur-Tal, which killed Raja Ugar Chand. A ruler of Jaisalmer, Raja Salivahana, thought this was an opportune time to attack the state as it was in a state of disarray due to the natural disaster and death of its ruler, so he sent his son Sobha to conquer the state. The attack was successful and a new dynasty headed by Bhati Rajputs was established. Sirmur was invaded by invader Jasrath's army, who also invaded fragments of Punjab and Jammu.

=== Sirmur State ===
Karm Prakash founded the city of Nahan in 1621, and it became the new capital. Karm was succeeded by Mandhata Prakash, who aided Khalil-ullah, a general of Mughal emperor Shah Jahan, in an invasion of Garhwal, and in return for this aid Kotaha was given to Sobhag Prakash, who had succeeded Mandhata. Further Mughal attacks on Garhwal were launched by Aurangzeb, and Sobhag would again join them, receiving yet more land in return. Sobhag's reign also saw great developments of Sirmur's agricultural resources. He was succeeded by Budh Prakash, who recovered Pinjaur for Aurangzeb's foster-brother. In 1684, Mat Prakash succeeded Budh, and the next year he gave asylum to Guru Gobind Singh, the tenth Sikh Guru, and allowed him to fortify Paonta, near which the Guru would defeat a combined Hill State force under the Rajas Bhim Chand of Kahlur and Fateh Shah of Garhwal, at the Battle of Bhangani; however, in 1750, Kirat Prakash, after having defeated the Raja of Garhwal, captured Sikh territories, including Naraingarh, Morni and Pinjaur, and entered into multiple alliances, aiding Raja Amar Singh of Patiala, helping in suppressing a rebellious vizier. Kirat also aided the Raja of Khalur against Ghulam Kadir, when the latter invaded Kahlur. Kirat similarly allied with the Raja of Garhwal against invading Gurkhas, and, despite being abandoned by his ally, Kirat managed to force the Gurkhas to agree to have the Ganges serve as the border between their kingdom and Garhwal.

Kirat was succeeded by Dharm Prakash, who repulsed attacks by the chief of Nalagarh and the Raja of Garhwal before dying in single combat against Raja Sansar Chand of Kangra, who had invaded Kahlur in 1793. Dharm was succeeded by his brother Karm Prakash, who faced a revolt that placed Ratn Prakash on the throne, and called upon the aid of the Gurkhas to suppress it. The Gurkhas successfully removed Ratn Prakash from the throne, but refused to restore Karm Prakash to it. The queen, a princess of Goler, issued an appeal to the British in restoring Karm to the throne. The appeal coincided with the British declaration of war on the Gurkhas, and the British sent a force to expel the Gurkhas from Sirmur, although they too did not restore Karm to the throne, instead placing his son Fateh Prakash, a minor, on it and annexing part of Sirmur territory, some later being returned in 1833 for a fee of 50,000 rupees. The Raja aided the British with a loan during the First Anglo-Afghan War, and joined the British in the First Anglo-Sikh War, with a Sirmur contingent seeing action at Hari-ke Pattan. Shamsher Prakash succeeded Fateh in 1856, and oversaw a modernization of Sirmur; forced labour was abolished, roads were constructed, revenue and forest surveys were carried out and a foundry, dispensaries, a post office and a telegraph office were built. Shamsher supported the British during the Indian Rebellion of 1857, and sent a contingent to aid the British in the Second Anglo-Afghan War. In 1897, Shamsher's second son, Major Bir Bikram Singh, led the Sirmur Sappers and Miners as they accompanied the Tirah expedition. Shamsher was succeeded by Surindar Bikram Prakash remodelled the courts of Sirmur, and was a member of the Imperial Legislative Council.

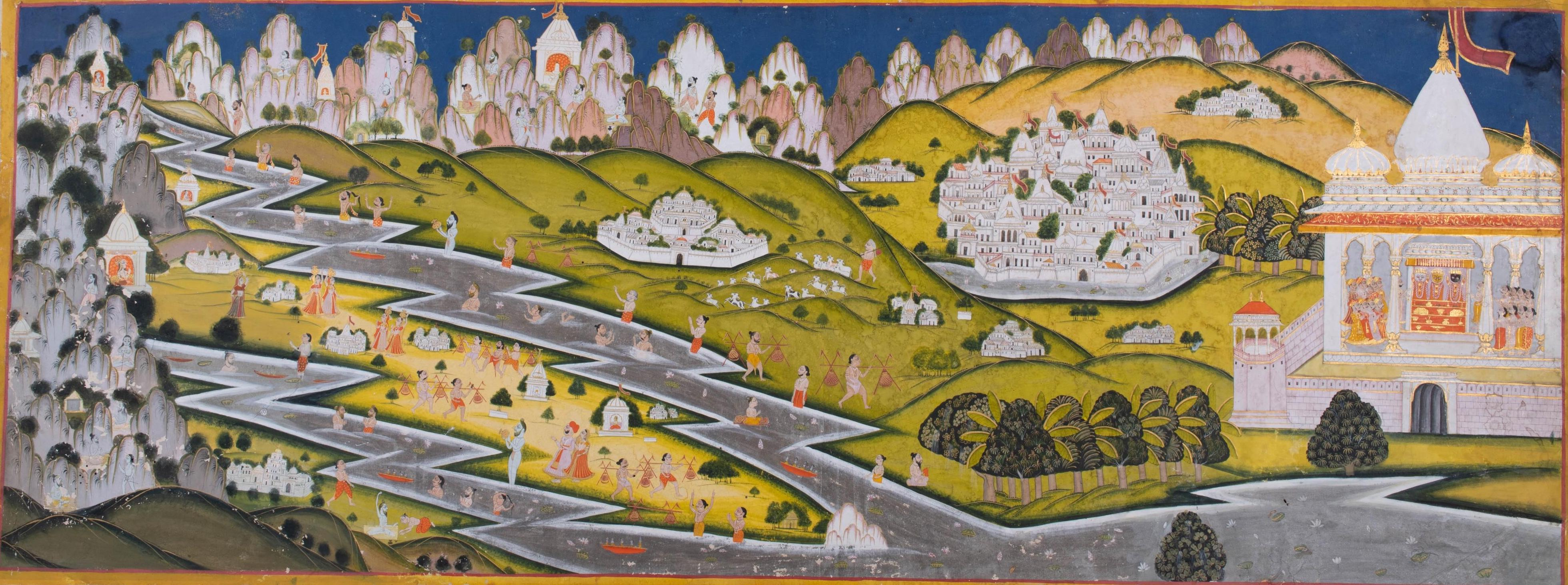
Painting of a panoramic view of pilgrims visiting holy sites at the Shivalik Hills near Sirmaur, Jodhpur, 1824

== Rulers ==
The rulers of Sirmur bore the title "Maharaja" from 1911 onward

Name	Portrait	Ruled from	Ruled until	Citation
Subhansh Prakash		1095	1099	
Mahe Prakash		1099	1117	
Udit Prakash		1117	1127	
Kaul Prakash		1127	1153	
Sumer Prakash		1153	1188	
Suraj Prakash		1188	1254	
Bhagat Prakash I		1254	1336	
Jagat Prakash		1336	1388	
Bir Prakash		1388	1398	
Naket Prakash		1398	1398	
Ratna Prakash		1398	1413	
Garv Prakash		1413	1432	
Brahm Prakash		1432	1446	
Hams Prakash		1446	1471	
Bhagat Prakash II		1471	1538	
Dharam Prakash		1538	1570	
Deep Prakash		1570	1585	
Budh Prakash		1605	1615	
Bhagat Prakash III		1615	1620	
Karam Prakash I		1621	1630	
Mandhata Prakash		1630	1654	
Sobhag Prakash		1654	1664	
Budh Prakash		1664	1684	
Mat Prakash		1684	1704	
Hari Prakash		1704	1712	
Bijay Prakash		1712	1736	
Pratap Prakash		1736	1754	
Kirat Prakash		1754	1770	
Jagat Prakash		1770	1789	
Dharam Prakash		1789	1793	
Karam Prakash II (died 1820)		1793	1803	
Ratan Prakash (installed by Gurkhas, hanged by the British in 1804)		1803	1804	
Karma Prakash II (died 1820)		1804	1815	
Fateh Prakash		1815	1850	
Raghbir Prakash		1850	1856	
Shamsher Prakash		1856	1898	
Surendra Bikram Prakash		1898	1911	
Amar Prakash		1911	1933	
Rajendra Prakash		1933	1947	
Lakshraj Prakash		2013	-	

== Demographics ==
Religious groups in Sirmur State (British Punjab province era)
Religious group	1901		1911		1921		1931		1941	
Religious group	Pop.	%	Pop.	%	Pop.	%	Pop.	%	Pop.	%
Hinduism (Note: 1931-1941: Including Ad-Dharmis)	128,478	94.69%	130,276	94.05%	132,431	94.29%	139,031	93.58%	146,199	93.7%
Islam	6,414	4.73%	6,016	4.34%	6,449	4.59%	7,020	4.73%	7,374	4.73%
Sikhism	688	0.51%	2,142	1.55%	1,449	1.03%	2,413	1.62%	2,334	1.5%
Jainism	61	0.04%	49	0.04%	65	0.05%	52	0.04%	81	0.05%
Christianity	46	0.03%	37	0.03%	44	0.03%	52	0.04%	38	0.02%
Buddhism	0	0%	0	0%	10	0.01%	0	0%	0	0%
Zoroastrianism	0	0%	0	0%	0	0%	0	0%	0	0%
Judaism	0	0%	0	0%	0	0%	0	0%	0	0%
Others	0	0%	0	0%	0	0%	0	0%	0	0%
Total population	135,687	100%	138,520	100%	140,448	100%	148,568	100%	156,026	100%
Note: British Punjab province era district borders are not an exact match in the present-day due to various bifurcations to district borders — which since created new districts — throughout the historic Punjab Province region during the post-independence era that have taken into account population increases.

== Artwork ==
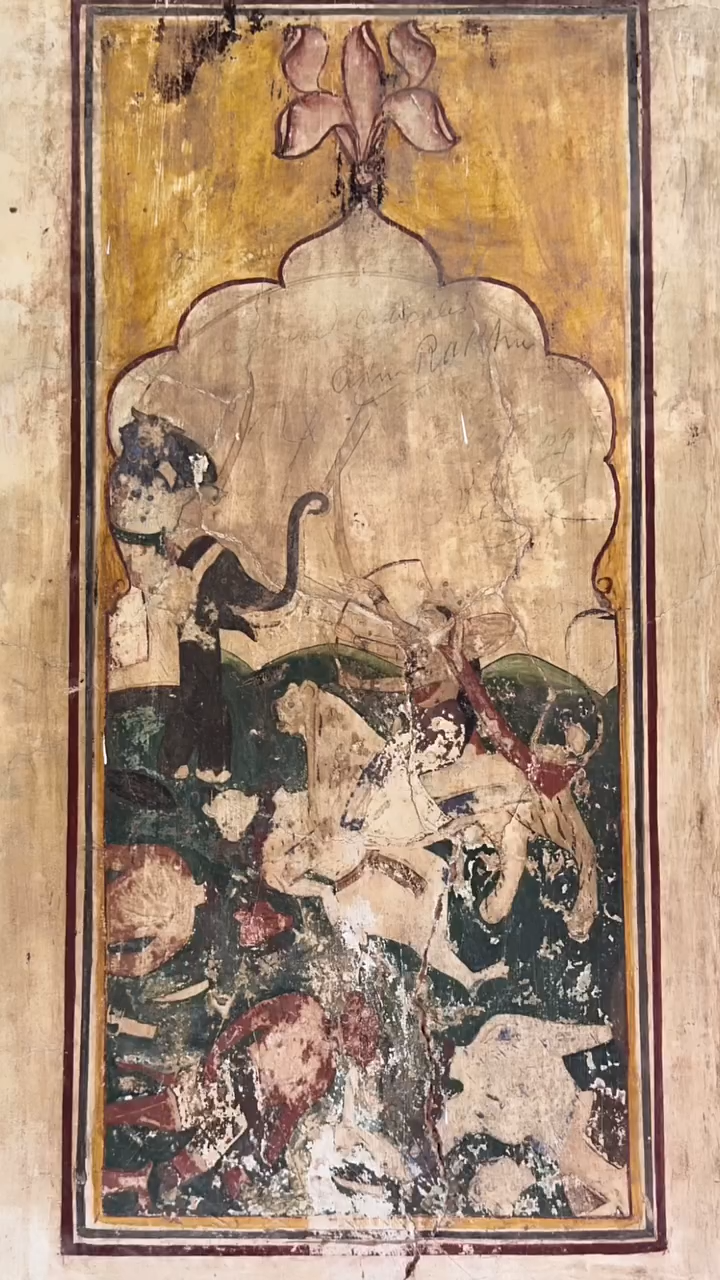
Fresco depicting a Devi Mahatmya scene from Indic mythology from a Shiva temple located in Nahan, painted during the reign of Sirmur State

Not many paintings depicting the historical rajas of Sirmur State have survived due to the Gurkha occupation of the state between 1803 and 1814, which led to the loss and destruction of much artwork, including any portraits of earlier rulers produced in Sirmur itself.
