= List of Rajya Sabha members from Rajasthan =

== Current members ==
Keys: BJP (5) INC (5)
There are total ten seats reserved for Rajasthan in Rajya Sabha. Currently BJP has 5 members and INC has 5 members in Rajya Sabha from Rajasthan.

#	Name	Party	Term start	Term end
1	Madan Rathore	BJP	04-Apr-2024	03-Apr-2030
2	Chunnilal Garasiya	BJP	04-Apr-2024	03-Apr-2030
3	Ghanshyam Tiwari	BJP	05-Jul-2022	04-Jul-2028
4	Satish Poonia	BJP	22-Jun-2026	21-Jun-2032
5	Alka Singh	BJP	26-Aug-2026	21-Jun-2032
6	Sonia Gandhi	INC	04-Apr-2024	03-Apr-2030
7	Randeep Surjewala	INC	05-Jul-2022	04-Jul-2028
8	Mukul Wasnik	INC	05-Jul-2022	04-Jul-2028
9	Pramod Tiwari	INC	05-Jul-2022	04-Jul-2028
10	Neeraj Dangi	INC	22-Jun-2026	21-Jun-2032

== Chronological list since 1952 ==
* represents current members

Name	Party	Term start	Term end	Term(s)	Notes
Neeraj Dangi	INC	22-Jun-2026	21-Jun-2032	2	
Alka Gurjar	BJP	22-Jun-2026	21-Jun-2032	1	
Satish Poonia	BJP	22-Jun-2026	21-Jun-2032	1	
Chunnilal Garasiya	BJP	04-Apr-2024	03-Apr-2030	1	
Madan Rathore	BJP	04-Apr-2024	03-Apr-2030	1	
Sonia Gandhi	INC	04-Apr-2024	03-Apr-2030	1	
Randeep Surjewala	INC	05-Jul-2022	04-Jul-2028	1	
Mukul Wasnik	INC	05-Jul-2022	04-Jul-2028	1	
Pramod Tiwari	INC	05-Jul-2022	04-Jul-2028	1	
Ghanshyam Tiwari	BJP	05-Jul-2022	04-Jul-2028	1	
Ravneet Singh Bittu	BJP	27-Aug-2024	21-Jun-2026	1	bye- resignation of K.C. Venugopal
Neeraj Dangi	INC	22-Jun-2020	21-Jun-2026	1	
Rajendra Gehlot	BJP	22-Jun-2020	21-Jun-2026	1	
K. C. Venugopal	INC	22-Jun-2020	4-June-2024	1	resigned
Manmohan Singh	INC	20-Aug-2019	03-Apr-2024	1	bye - death of Madan Lal Saini
Kirodi Lal Meena	BJP	04-Apr-2018	03-Apr-2024	1	
Bhupender Yadav	BJP	04-Apr-2018	03-Apr-2024	2	
Madan Lal Saini	BJP	04-Apr-2018	24-Jun-2019	1	expired
Alphons Kannanthanam	BJP	10-Nov-2017	04-Jul-2022	1	bye - resignation of Venkaiah Naidu
Om Prakash Mathur	BJP	05-Jul-2016	04-Jul-2022	2	
Harshvardhan Singh Dungarpur	BJP	05-Jul-2016	04-Jul-2022	1	
Ram Kumar Verma	BJP	05-Jul-2016	04-Jul-2022	1	
Venkaiah Naidu	BJP	05-Jul-2016	10-Aug-2017	1	elected as Vice President of India
Ramnarayan Dudi	BJP	10-Apr-2014	09-Apr-2020	1	
Vijay Goel	BJP	10-Apr-2014	09-Apr-2020	1	
Narayan Lal Panchariya	BJP	10-Apr-2014	09-Apr-2020	1	
Narendra Budania	INC	04-Apr-2012	03-Apr-2018	3	
Abhishek Singhvi	INC	04-Apr-2012	03-Apr-2018	2	
Bhupender Yadav	BJP	04-Apr-2012	03-Apr-2018	1	
Anand Sharma	INC	05-Jul-2010	04-Jul-2016	1	
Ashk Ali Tak	INC	05-Jul-2010	04-Jul-2016	1	
Ram Jethmalani	BJP	05-Jul-2010	04-Jul-2016	1	
V. P. Singh Badnore	BJP	05-Jul-2010	04-Jul-2016	1	
Narendra Budania	INC	15-Jun-2010	03-Apr-2012	2	bye - death of Krishan Lal Balmiki
Narendra Budania	INC	04-Aug-2009	04-Jul-2010	1	bye - resignation of Jaswant Singh
Om Prakash Mathur	BJP	10-Apr-2008	09-Apr-2014	1	
Gyan Prakash Pilania	BJP	10-Apr-2008	09-Apr-2014	2	
Prabha Thakur	INC	10-Apr-2008	09-Apr-2014	2	
Ramdas Agarwal	BJP	04-Apr-2006	03-Apr-2012	3	
Krishan Lal Balmiki	BJP	04-Apr-2006	21-Apr-2010	1	expired
Abhishek Singhvi	INC	04-Apr-2006	03-Apr-2012	1	
Jaswant Singh	BJP	05-Jul-2004	16-May-2009	4	elected to Darjeeling Lok Sabha
Lalit Kishore Chaturvedi	BJP	05-Jul-2004	04-Jul-2010	1	
Najma Heptulla	BJP	05-Jul-2004	04-Jul-2010	1	
Santosh Bagrodia	INC	05-Jul-2004	04-Jul-2010	3	
Gyan Prakash Pilania	BJP	29-Jun-2004	09-Apr-2008	1	bye - death of Abrar Ahmed
Prabha Thakur	INC	10-Apr-2002	09-Apr-2008	1	
Natwar Singh	INC	10-Apr-2002	23-Feb-2008	1	resigned
Abrar Ahmed	INC	10-Apr-2002	04-May-2004	2	expired
Jamuna Devi Barupal	INC	04-Apr-2000	03-Apr-2006	1	
R. P. Goenka	INC	04-Apr-2000	03-Apr-2006	1	
Mool Chand Meena	INC	04-Apr-2000	03-Apr-2006	2	
Laxmi Mall Singhvi	BJP	05-Jul-1998	04-Jul-2004	1	
Jaswant Singh	BJP	05-Jul-1998	04-Jul-2004	3	
Santosh Bagrodia	INC	05-Jul-1998	04-Jul-2004	2	
Aimaduddin Ahmad Khan	INC	05-Jul-1998	18-Dec-2003	1	elected to Tijara Assembly
Onkar Singh Lakhawat	BJP	16-Oct-1997	02-Apr-2000	1	bye - death of Satish Chandra Agarwal
Mahesh Chandra Sharma	BJP	10-Apr-1996	09-Apr-2002	1	
Ramdas Agarwal	BJP	10-Apr-1996	09-Apr-2002	2	
K. K. Birla	INC	10-Apr-1996	09-Apr-2002	3	
Satish Chandra Agarwal	BJP	03-Apr-1994	10-Sep-1997	1	expired
Kanak Mal Katara	BJP	03-Apr-1994	02-Apr-2000	1	
Bhuvnesh Chaturvedi	INC	03-Apr-1994	02-Apr-2000	3	
Sunder Singh Bhandari	BJP	05-Jul-1992	26-Apr-1998	2	appointed as Governor of Bihar
Shiv Charan Singh	BJP	05-Jul-1992	04-Jul-1998	1	
Rajendra Prasad Mody	Ind	05-Jul-1992	04-Jul-1998	1	
Moolchand Meena	INC	05-Jul-1992	04-Jul-1998	1	
Ramdas Agarwal	BJP	10-Apr-1990	09-Apr-1996	1	
M. G. K. Menon	JD	10-Apr-1990	09-Apr-1996	1	
K. K. Birla	INC	10-Apr-1990	09-Apr-1996	2	
Gaj Singh	BJP	26-Mar-1990	04-Jul-1992	1	bye - resignation of Jaswant Singh
Bhuvnesh Chaturvedi	INC	03-Apr-1988	02-Apr-1994	2	
Abrar Ahmed	INC	03-Apr-1988	02-Apr-1994	1	
Kamal Morarka	JD	03-Apr-1988	02-Apr-1994	1	
Dhuleshwar Meena	INC	05-Jul-1986	04-Jul-1992	2	
B. L. Panwar	INC	05-Jul-1986	04-Jul-1992	2	
Santosh Bagrodia	INC	05-Jul-1986	04-Jul-1992	1	
Jaswant Singh	BJP	05-Jul-1986	27-Nov-1989	2	elected to Jodhpur Lok Sabha
H. P. Sharma	INC	02-Jul-1985	02-Apr-1988	1	bye - resignation of Mohammed Usman Arif
B. L. Panwar	INC	02-Jul-1985	04-Jul-1986	1	bye - resignation of Ram Niwas Mirdha
Bhim Raj	INC	10-Apr-1984	09-Apr-1990	2	
Shanti Pahadia	INC	10-Apr-1984	09-Apr-1990	1	
K. K. Birla	Ind	10-Apr-1984	09-Apr-1990	1	
Bhuvnesh Chaturvedi	INC	03-Apr-1982	02-Apr-1988	1	
Natha Singh	INC	03-Apr-1982	02-Apr-1988	1	
Mohammed Usman Arif	INC	03-Apr-1982	31-Mar-1985	3	appointed as Governor of Uttar Pradesh
Molana Asraul Haq	INC	05-Jul-1980	04-Jul-1986	1	
Ram Niwas Mirdha	INC	05-Jul-1980	29-Dec-1984	4	elected to Barmer Lok Sabha
Dhuleshwar Meena	INC	05-Jul-1980	04-Jul-1986	1	
Jaswant Singh	BJP	05-Jul-1980	04-Jul-1986	1	
Hari Shankar Bhabhra	BJS	10-Apr-1978	09-Apr-1984	1	
Radheshyam Morarka	JP	10-Apr-1978	09-Apr-1984	1	
Bhim Raj	INC	10-Apr-1978	09-Apr-1984	1	
Dinesh Chandra Swamy	INC	03-Apr-1976	02-Apr-1982	1	
Ushi Khan	INC	03-Apr-1976	02-Apr-1982	1	
Mohammed Usman Arif	INC	03-Apr-1976	02-Apr-1982	2	
Rishi Kumar Mishra	INC	03-Apr-1974	02-Apr-1980	1	
Kishan Lal Sharma	INC	03-Apr-1974	02-Apr-1980	1	
Ram Niwas Mirdha	INC	03-Apr-1974	02-Apr-1980	3	
Nathi Singh	LKD	03-Apr-1974	02-Apr-1980	1	
Jamnalal Berwa	INC	10-Apr-1972	09-Apr-1978	1	
Lakshmi Kumari Chundawat	INC	10-Apr-1972	09-Apr-1978	1	
Ganesh Lal Mali	INC	10-Apr-1972	09-Apr-1978	1	
Narayani Devi Verma	INC	03-Apr-1970	02-Apr-1976	1	
Mohammed Usman Arif	INC	03-Apr-1970	02-Apr-1976	1	
Jagdish Prasad Mathur	BJS	03-Apr-1970	02-Apr-1976	1	
Bal Krishna Kaul	INC	04-Oct-1968	02-Apr-1974	1	bye - death of Harish Chandra Mathur
Kumbha Ram Arya	INC	03-Apr-1968	02-Apr-1974	2	
Ram Niwas Mirdha	INC	03-Apr-1968	02-Apr-1974	2	
Harish Chandra Mathur	Ind	03-Apr-1968	12-Jun-1968	3	expired
Mahendra Kumar Mohta	SWA	03-Apr-1968	02-Apr-1974	1	
Harish Chandra Mathur	Ind	04-May-1967	02-Apr-1968	2	
Ram Niwas Mirdha	INC	04-May-1967	02-Apr-1968	1	bye - resignation of Ramesh Chandra Vyas
Dalpat Singh	INC	03-Apr-1966	02-Apr-1972	2	
Mangla Devi Talwar	INC	03-Apr-1966	02-Apr-1972	1	
Jagannath Pahadia	INC	22-Mar-1966	23-Feb-1967	2	elected to Bayana Lok Sabha bye
Jagannath Pahadia	INC	02-Mar-1965	21-Mar-1966	1	bye
Dalpat Singh	INC	28-Jun-1964	02-Apr-1966	1	bye - death of Vijay Singh
Sunder Singh Bhandari	BJS	03-Apr-1966	02-Apr-1972	1	
Shantilal Kothari	INC	03-Apr-1964	02-Apr-1970	1	
Sadiq Ali	INC	03-Apr-1964	02-Apr-1970	2	
Devi Singh	SWA	03-Apr-1964	02-Apr-1970	1	
Sharda Bhargava	INC	22-Aug-1963	02-Apr-1966	3	bye - death of Jai Narayan Vyas
Nemi Chand Kasliwal	INC	07-Apr-1962	02-Apr-1964	1	bye - resignation of Tika Ram Paliwal
P. N. Kathju	INC	03-Apr-1962	02-Apr-1968	1	
Ramesh Chandra Vyas	INC	03-Apr-1962	22-Feb-1967	1	resigned
Maulana Abdul Shakoor	INC	03-Apr-1962	02-Apr-1968	3	
Sawai Man Singh	Ind	03-Apr-1962	08-Nov-1965	1	appointed as Ambassador to Spain
Jai Narayan Vyas	INC	03-Apr-1960	14-Mar-1963	2	expired
Vijay Singh	INC	03-Apr-1960	13-May-1964	2	expired
Kumbha Ram Arya	INC	03-Apr-1960	26-Oct-1964	1	
Swami Keshwanand	INC	03-Apr-1958	02-Apr-1964	2	
Tika Ram Paliwal	INC	03-Apr-1958	01-Mar-1962	1	elected to Hindaun Lok Sabha
Sadiq Ali	INC	04-Nov-1958	02-Apr-1964	1	
Jai Narayan Vyas	INC	20-Apr-1957	02-Apr-1960	1	bye - resignation of Barkatullah Khan
K. L. Shrimali	INC	03-Apr-1956	02-Apr-1962	2	
Maulana Abdul Shakoor	INC	03-Apr-1956	02-Apr-1962	2	
Sharda Bhargava	INC	03-Apr-1956	02-Apr-1962	2	
Jaswant Singh	Ind	03-Apr-1956	02-Apr-1962	1	
Adityendra	INC	03-Apr-1954	02-Apr-1960	1	
Vijay Singh	INC	03-Apr-1954	02-Apr-1960	1	
Barkatullah Khan	INC	03-Apr-1954	21-Mar-1957	2	elected to Jodhpur Assembly
Swami Keshwanand	INC	03-Apr-1952	02-Apr-1958	1	
Harish Chandra Mathur	Ind	03-Apr-1952	02-Apr-1958	1	
Sardar Singh	Ind	03-Apr-1952	16-Sep-1956	1	resigned
Laxman Singh	Ind	03-Apr-1952	02-Apr-1958	1	
Sharda Bhargava	INC	03-Apr-1952	02-Apr-1956	1	
K. L. Shrimali	INC	03-Apr-1952	02-Apr-1956	1	
Ramnath A Poddar	INC	03-Apr-1952	02-Apr-1954	1	
Mahindra Singh Ranawat	INC	03-Apr-1952	02-Apr-1954	1	
Barkatullah Khan	INC	03-Apr-1952	02-Apr-1954	1	

=== Ajmer State ===
Name	Party	Term start	Term end	Term(s)
Maulana Abdul Shakoor	INC	03-Apr-1952	02-Apr-1954	1
