= 1992 Rajya Sabha elections =

Elections for the Upper House of Indian Parliament

Rajya Sabha elections were held in 1992, to elect members of the Rajya Sabha, Indian Parliament's upper chamber. 23 members from 8 states were elected

== Elections ==
Elections were held in 1992 to elect members from various states. The list is incomplete.

=== Members elected ===
The following members are elected in the elections held in 1992. They are members for the term 1992-98 and retire in year 1998, except in case of the resignation or death before the term.

=== Andhra Pradesh ===
#	Name	Party	Term start
1	G. Prathap Reddy	INC	03-Apr-1992
2	A. S. Chowdhri	INC	03-Apr-1992
3	V. Hanumantha Rao	INC	03-Apr-1992
4	V Rajeshwar Rao	INC	03-Apr-1992
5	Renuka Chowdhury	TDP	03-Apr-1992
6	N. Giri Prasad	CPI	03-Apr-1992

=== Assam ===
#	Name	Party	Term start
1	Matang Sinh	INC	03-Apr-1992
2	Tara Charan Majumdar	Ind	03-Apr-1992

=== Bihar ===
#	Name	Party	Term start
1	Ramendra Kumar Yadav	JD	08-Jul-1992
2	Ram Deo Bhandary	JD	08-Jul-1992
3	Anil Kumar	JD	08-Jul-1992
4	Inder Kumar Gujral	JD	08-Jul-1992
5	S. S. Ahluwalia	INC	08-Jul-1992
6	Gaya Singh	CPI	08-Jul-1992
7	Parmeshwar Agarwalla	BJP	08-Jul-1992

=== Haryana ===
#	Name	Party	Term start
1	Ramji Lal	INC	02-Aug-1992
2	Shamsher Singh Surjewala	INC	02-Aug-1992

=== Himachal Pradesh ===
#	Name	Party	Term start
1	Maheshwar Singh	BJP	03-Apr-1992

=== Karnataka ===
#	Name	Party	Term start
1	Margaret Alva	INC	03-Apr-1992
2	K. R. Jayadevappa	INC	03-Apr-1992
3	Gundappa Korwar	INC	03-Apr-1992
4	Satchidananda	INC	03-Apr-1992

=== Kerala ===
#	Name	Party	Term start
1	Thennala Balakrishna Pillai	INC	03-Apr-1992
2	B. V. Abdulla Koya	IUML	03-Apr-1992
3	M. A. Baby	CPM	03-Apr-1992

=== Madhya Pradesh ===
#	Name	Party	Term start
1	Dilip Singh Judeo	BJP	30-Jun-1992
2	Narain Prasad Gupta	BJP	30-Jun-1992
3	Jagannath Singh	BJP	30-Jun-1992
4	O. Rajagopal	BJP	30-Jun-1992
5	Ajit Jogi	INC	30-Jun-1992

=== Maharashtra ===
#	Name	Party	Term start
1	Shivajirao Girdhar Patil	INC	05-Jul-1992
2	Shrikant Jichkar	INC	05-Jul-1992
3	Sushilkumar Shinde	INC	05-Jul-1992
4	Najma Heptulla	INC	05-Jul-1992
5	Pramod Mahajan	BJP	05-Jul-1992
6	Satish Pradhan	SS	05-Jul-1992

=== Nagaland ===
#	Name	Party	Term start
1	Vizol Koso	NPC (Note: Naga People's Council)	03-Apr-1992

=== Punjab ===
#	Name	Party	Term start
1	Balbir Singh	INC	10-Apr-1992
2	Jagir Singh Dard	INC	10-Apr-1992
3	Iqbal Singh	INC	10-Apr-1992
4	Venod Sharma	INC	10-Apr-1992
5	Surinder Singla	INC	10-Apr-1992
6	Mohinder Singh Kalyan	INC	10-Apr-1992
7	Virendra Kataria	INC	10-Apr-1992

=== Odisha ===
#	Name	Party	Term start
1	Ila Panda	JD	02-Jul-1992
2	Narendra Pradhan	JD	02-Jul-1992
3	S. R. Bommai	JD	02-Jul-1992

=== Rajasthan ===
#	Name	Party	Term start
1	Sunder Singh Bhandari	BJP	05-Jul-1992
2	Shiv Charan Singh	BJP	05-Jul-1992
3	Rajendra Prasad Mody	Ind	05-Jul-1992
4	Moolchand Meena	INC	05-Jul-1992

=== Tamil Nadu ===
#	Name	Party	Term start
1	S. Austin	ADMK	30-Jun-1992
2	V. V. Rajan Chellappa	ADMK	30-Jun-1992
3	N. Thangaraj Pandian	ADMK	30-Jun-1992
4	G. Swaminathan	ADMK	30-Jun-1992
5	S. Muthu Mani	ADMK	30-Jun-1992
6	Jayanthi Natarajan	INC	30-Jun-1992

=== Tripura ===
#	Name	Party	Term start
1	Sudhir Ranjan Majumdar	INC	03-Apr-1992

=== Uttar Pradesh ===
#	Name	Party	Term start
1	Murli Manohar Joshi	BJP	05-Jul-1992
2	T N Chaturvedi	BJP	05-Jul-1992
3	Baldev Prakash	BJP	05-Jul-1992
4	Ishwar Chandra Gupta	BJP	05-Jul-1992
5	Ram Ratan Ram	BJP	05-Jul-1992
6	Vishnu Kant Shastri	BJP	05-Jul-1992
7	Naunihal Singh	BJP	05-Jul-1992
8	Sompal Shastri	JD	05-Jul-1992
9	Mufti Mohammad Sayeed	JD	05-Jul-1992
10	Syed Sibtey Razi	INC	05-Jul-1992
11	Ram Gopal Yadav	JP	05-Jul-1992
12	Mohammad Masood Khan	Ind	05-Jul-1992

== Bye-elections ==
The following bye elections were held in the year 1992.

State - Member - Party

1. Bihar - - - INC ( ele 02/03/1992 term till 1994 )
