= Bharatiya Janata Party – Rajasthan =

Rajasthan affiliate of the Bharatiya Janata Party

Bharatiya Janata Party – Rajasthan भारतीय जनता पार्टी – राजस्थान
- Leader: Bhajan Lal Sharma (Chief Minister)
- President: Madan Rathore
- General Secretary: Mithilesh Gautam
- Founder: Atal Bihari Vajpayee; Lal Krishna Advani; Murli Manohar Joshi; Nanaji Deshmukh; K. R. Malkani; Sikandar Bakht; Vijay Kumar Malhotra; Vijaya Raje Scindia; Bhairon Singh Shekhawat; Shanta Kumar; Ram Jethmalani; Jagannathrao Joshi
- Headquarters: C-51 Sardar Patel Marg, C-Scheme Jaipur-302001, Rajasthan
- Colours: Saffron
- Seats in Rajya Sabha: 5 / 10
- Seats in Lok Sabha: 14 / 25
- Seats in Rajasthan Legislative Assembly: 119 / 200

Election symbol
- Lotus

Party flag

Website
- bjprajasthan.org

Bharatiya Janata Party - Rajasthan (BJP Rajasthan) is the state unit of the Bharatiya Janata Party in the Indian state of Rajasthan. It functions as the regional wing of the national Bharatiya Janata Party (BJP), which is one of the two major political parties in India. The party has played a significant role in the politics of Rajasthan, having formed the state government multiple times. The current state president is Madan Rathore, who succeeded Chandra Prakash Joshi in 2024. Prominent leaders from the state unit include incumbent chief minister Bhajan Lal Sharma and Vasundhara Raje, who served as the first female Chief Minister of Rajasthan, holding office from 2003 to 2008 and again from 2013 to 2018. She has also previously served as the state president of the party.

== History ==
=== Bharatiya Jana Sangh (1951-77) ===
The roots of the Bharatiya Janata Party in Rajasthan dates back to the times of its predecessor Bharatiya Jana Sangh which was traditionally strong in some pockets of Rajasthan. Of the 3 seats which the BJS had won in the 1951–52 Indian general election, one of the seat was Chittorgarh (Lok Sabha constituency) won by Umashankar Muljibhai Trivedi. The elections held to the Rajasthan Legislative Assembly in 1952 witnessed the BJS winning 8 seats out of the 50 seats it had contested and had garnered 5.93% of the votes polled. However the tally of the BJS fell in the subsequent election as Ram Rajya Parishad led by Swami Karpatri too contested the elections and the vote division took place. However, in the subsequent elections of 1962 and 1967 the BJS won 15 and 22 seats respectively crossing vote share of 10%. In the 1972 elections despite maintaining the vote share the BJS could win only 8 seats.

=== Janata Party (1977-80) ===
In 1975, Indira Gandhi declared a state of Emergency, and threw many major opposition politicians in jail including the leaders of the BJS. In 1977, the Emergency was withdrawn, and elections were held. The BJS, joined forces with the Bharatiya Lok Dal, the Congress (O), and the Socialist Party, to form the Janata Party. The elections saw Janata Party emerging victorious in 152/200 seats in the Assembly. As the Jan Sangh faction was the largest in the legislative party, its leader Bhairon Singh Shekhawat became the first non-Congress Chief Minister of Rajasthan. However the government began to wither as significant ideological and political divisions emerged. The party consisted of veteran socialists, trade unionists and pro-business leaders, making major reforms difficult to achieve without triggering a divide. Socialist politicians shared an aversion to the Hindu nationalist agenda of the Rashtriya Swayamsevak Sangh, whose members included Vajpayee, Advani and other leaders from the former Bharatiya Jana Sangh. The party thereafter split and Indira Gandhi emerged victorious in the 1980 Indian general election and came back to power. The Janata Party government led by Bhairon Singh Shekhawat was dismissed on the grounds that the Government had lost the public trust.

=== Bharatiya Janata Party (1980- present) ===
In April 1980, shortly after the elections, the National Executive Council of the Janata Party banned its members from being 'dual members' of party and the RSS. In response, the former Jana Sangh members left to create a new political party, known as the Bharatiya Janata Party. Although the newly formed BJP was technically distinct from the Jana Sangh, the bulk of its rank and file were identical to its predecessor which helped the BJP in retaining some of its traditional Jan Sangh vote base. The BJP emerged as the principal opposition to the ruling Congress both the times in 1980 as well as 1985.

The allegations of corruption, known as the Bofors scandal, against Rajiv Gandhi witnessed the Congress party's defeat in 1989 Indian general election. The National Front coalition was formed with the outside support from the Left Front and the Bharatiya Janata Party and V. P. Singh became the prime minister. The Congress subsequently even lost the 1990 Rajasthan elections to the BJP. The BJP with 85 seats formed a coalition with the Janata Dal which had 55 seats and Bhairon Singh Shekhawat became the first Chief Minister from the Bharatiya Janata Party on 4 March 1990.

On 6 December 1992, Babri Masjid was demolished in Uttar Pradesh and Kalyan Singh, the then Chief Minister of Uttar Pradesh took the moral responsibility and resigned. The state was put under President's rule. However P. V. Narasimha Rao, the then Prime Minister undemocratically dismissed the BJP ruled state Governments in Rajasthan, Madhya Pradesh, Himachal Pradesh due to violence erupted in these states with the fall of the Masjid, while the Congress Government in Maharashtra was spared despite Bombay riots and 1993 Bombay bombings.

While the BJP lost subsequent elections held in 1993 to Uttar Pradesh, Madhya Pradesh and Himachal Pradesh, it was able to win a wafer thin majority in Rajasthan and managed to form a Government with support of independents under Bhairon Singh Shekhawat. The BJP however lost 1998 state elections to the Congress led by Ashok Gehlot and was reduced to 33 seats in the Assembly of 200 seats. Thereafter the power has been alternating between the BJP and the Congress once in every 5 years.

== Youth Wing (Bharatiya Janata Yuva Morcha (BJYM), Rajasthan) ==
In 2026, Shankar Gora was appointed as the State President of the Bharatiya Janata Yuva Morcha (BJYM) – Rajasthan, the youth wing of the Bharatiya Janata Party (BJP).

He assumed office during an official ceremony where Rajasthan BJP President Madan Rathore administered the oath and formally handed over the charge.

His appointment was part of a broader organisational restructuring within the Rajasthan unit of the BJP, which included the appointment of several new morcha (front) presidents.

== Support base ==
For many years, the BJP support base was mainly Rajput due to the fact that the BJP was led by Bhairon Singh Shekhawat and the disillusionment of Rajputs with the Congress due to the land reforms undertaken by the Congress Government due to which large number of tillers, with the new act, became land owners while the jagirdars who were mainly Rajputs became dispossessed of their lands. The Brahmins largely remained with the Congress till early 90's. However, they shifted to the BJP after Mandal Commission and Ram Janmabhoomi movement.

Over the years, the BJP has been able to garner a section of Jat's who were traditionally Congress voters as Atal Bihari Vajpayee had announced reservation for the Jats in Rajasthan. The Jats also resented the fact that in spite of Jat's voting Congress in 1998 state elections, Parasram Maderna, a Jat leader was not made the Chief Minister in favour of Ashok Gehlot, a non-Jat. Besides, the projection of Vasundhara Raje as Jat ki Bahu (daughter-in-law of Jat) also helped the BJP to garner Jat votes and cross the majority mark in 2003 state elections, a feat which even the party patriarch Bhairon Singh Shekhawat couldn't achieve.

== Electoral performance ==
=== Lok Sabha election ===
Year	Seats won	+/-	Outcome
1980	0 / 25	Steady	Opposition
1984	0 / 25	Steady	Opposition
1989	13 / 25	▲13	Outside support to JD
1991	12 / 25	▼1	Opposition
1996	12 / 25	Steady	Government, later Opposition
1998	5 / 25	▼7	Government
1999	16 / 25	▲11	Government
2004	21 / 25	▲5	Opposition
2009	4 / 25	▼17	Opposition
2014	25 / 25	▲21	Government
2019	24 / 25	▼1	Government
2024	14 / 25	▼10	Government

=== Vidhan Sabha election ===
Year	Seats won	+/-	Voteshare (%)	+/- (%)	Outcome
1980	32 / 200	▲32	18.6%	▲18.6%	Opposition
1985	39 / 200	▲7	21.24%	▲2.64%	Opposition
1990	85 / 200	▲46	25.25%	▲4.01%	Government
1993	95 / 200	▲10	38.6%	▲13.35%	Government
1998	33 / 200	▼62	33.23%	▼5.37%	Opposition
2003	120 / 200	▲87	39.2%	▲5.97%	Government
2008	78 / 200	▼42	34.27%	▼4.93%	Opposition
2013	163 / 200	▲85	45.17%	▲10.9%	Government
2018	73 / 200	▼90	38.08%	▼7.09%	Opposition
2023	115 / 200	▲42	41.69%	▲3.61%	Government

== Leadership ==
=== Chief ministers ===
#	Portrait	Name	Constituency	Term of office			Assembly
1		Bhairon Singh Shekhawat	Chhabra	4 March 1990	15 December 1992	7 years, 283 days	9th
1		Bhairon Singh Shekhawat	Bali	4 December 1993	1 December 1998	7 years, 283 days	10th
2		Vasundhara Raje	Jhalrapatan	8 December 2003	11 December 2008	10 years, 6 days	12th
2		Vasundhara Raje	Jhalrapatan	13 December 2013	16 December 2018	10 years, 6 days	14th
3		Bhajan Lal Sharma	Sanganer	15 December 2023	Incumbent	2 years, 277 days	16th

=== Deputy Chief Ministers ===
#	Portrait	Name	Constituency	Term of office			Chief Minister
1		Hari Shankar Bhabhra	Ratangarh	6 October 1994	29 November 1998	4 years, 54 days	Bhairon Singh Shekhawat
2		Diya Kumari	Vidhyadhar Nagar	15 December 2023	Incumbent	2 years, 277 days	Bhajan Lal Sharma
3		Prem Chand Bairwa	Dudu	15 December 2023	Incumbent	2 years, 277 days	Bhajan Lal Sharma

=== Leaders of Opposition ===
#	Portrait	Name	Constituency	Term of office			Assembly	Chief Minister
1		Bhairon Singh Shekhawat	Chhabra	15 July 1980	9 March 1985	13 years, 67 days	7th	Jagannath Pahadia; Shiv Charan Mathur; Hira Lal Devpura
1		Bhairon Singh Shekhawat	Amber	28 March 1985	1 March 1990	13 years, 67 days	8th	Hari Dev Joshi; Shiv Charan Mathur
1		Bhairon Singh Shekhawat	Bali	8 January 1999	18 August 2002	13 years, 67 days	11th	Ashok Gehlot
2		Gulab Chand Kataria	Bari Sadri	24 August 2002	4 December 2003	1 year, 102 days	11th	Ashok Gehlot
3		Vasundhara Raje	Jhalrapatan	2 January 2009	20 February 2013	4 years, 49 days	13th	Ashok Gehlot
(2)		Gulab Chand Kataria	Udaipur	21 February 2013	9 December 2013	291 days	13th	Ashok Gehlot
(2)		Gulab Chand Kataria	Udaipur	17 January 2019	16 February 2023	4 years, 30 days	15th	Ashok Gehlot
4		Rajendra Singh Rathore	Churu	2 April 2023	2 December 2023	244 days	15th	Ashok Gehlot

=== List of presidents ===
#	Portrait	Name	Tenure		
1		Jagdish Prasad Mathur	1980	1981	1 year
2		Hari Shankar Bhabhra	1981	1986	5 years
3		Bhanwar Lal Sharma	1986	1988	2 years
4		Lalit Kishore Chaturvedi	1988	1989	1 year
(3)		Bhanwar Lal Sharma	1989	1990	1 year
5		Ramdas Agarwal	May-1990	1997	7 years
6		Raghuveer Singh Koshal	18-Dec-1997	26-May-1999	1 year, 159 days
7		Gulab Chand Kataria	1999	1999	1 year
(3)		Bhanwar Lal Sharma	2000	2002	2 years
8		Vasundhara Raje	2002	2002	1 year
(4)		Lalit Kishore Chaturvedi	2003	2006	3 years
9		Mahesh Chand Sharma	7-Feb-2006	7-Jan-2008	2 years
10		Om Prakash Mathur	7-Jan-2008	10-Jul-2009	1 year
11		Arun Chaturvedi	10-Jul-2009	08-Feb-2013	3 years, 213 days
(8)		Vasundhara Raje	08-Feb-2013	12-Feb-2014	1 year, 4 days
12		Ashok Parnami	12-Feb-2014	29-Jun-2018	4 years, 137 days
13		Madan Lal Saini	29-Jun-2018	24-Jun-2019	360 days
14		Satish Poonia	15-Sep-2019	23-Mar-2023	3 years, 189 days
15		Chandra Prakash Joshi	23-Mar-2023	26-Jul-2024	1 year, 125 days
16		Madan Rathore	26 July 2024	Present	2 years, 54 days

== See also ==
- Bharatiya Janata Party – Gujarat
- Bharatiya Janata Party – Uttar Pradesh
- Bharatiya Janata Party – Madhya Pradesh
- State units of the Bharatiya Janata Party
