= Madan Rathore =

Indian politician from Rajasthan

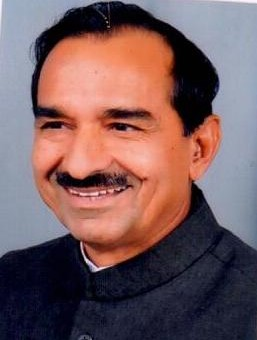
- Official Portrait

President, Bharatiya Janata Party - Rajasthan
- Incumbent
- Assumed office 26 July 2024
- National President: J. P. Nadda; Nitin Nabin
- Preceded by: Chandra Prakash Joshi

Member of Parliament, Rajya Sabha
- Incumbent
- Assumed office 3 April 2024
- Preceded by: Kirodi Lal Meena
- Constituency: List of Rajya Sabha members from Rajasthan

Member of Rajasthan Legislative Assembly
- In office (2003–2008), (2013 – 2018)
- Preceded by: Bina Kak
- Succeeded by: Joraram Kumawat
- Constituency: Sumerpur

Deputy Chief Whip Rajasthan Legislative Assembly
- In office 2015–2018

Personal details
- Born: 2 July 1954 (age 72) Raipur, Rajasthan, India
- Party: Bharatiya Janata Party
- Education: B.Sc (Mathematics)
- Alma mater: Bangur College, Pali (1974)

Madan Rathore is an Indian politician from Rajasthan who is currently serving as the President of the Bharatiya Janata Party, Rajasthan. He has been a member of the Rajya Sabha since April 2024, representing Rajasthan.

He previously served as a member of the Rajasthan Legislative Assembly from the Sumerpur Assembly constituency for two non-consecutive terms (2003–2008 and 2013–2018), defeating Congress leader Bina Kak in both elections. He belongs to Teli community

== Education ==
Rathore holds a Bachelor of Science degree in Mathematics from Bangur College, affiliated with the University of Rajasthan, completed in 1974.

== Political career ==
Rathore began his political involvement as a pracharak with the Rashtriya Swayamsevak Sangh in the 1970s. He joined the Bharatiya Janata Party in the 1980s and held various organizational roles in the Pali district unit. He served as Deputy Chief Whip in the 14th Rajasthan Legislative Assembly from 2015 to 2018.

In February 2024, the BJP nominated Rathore along with former minister Chunnilal Garasiya for the Rajya Sabha elections. They were elected unopposed on 27 February 2024.

== Rajasthan BJP State President ==
On 26 July 2024, Rathore was appointed as the President of the Bharatiya Janata Party, Rajasthan, succeeding Chandra Prakash Joshi. He was re-elected unopposed in February 2025.

== Awards and recognition ==
In 2025, Rathore was selected for the Sansad Ratna Award, which recognizes Members of Parliament for their performance in legislative work. He was awarded in the "Overall Category" based on participation in debates, questions, and bills. The selection was made by a jury chaired by Hansraj Ahir, Chairperson of the National Commission for Backward Classes.

== Electoral record ==
Election results
Year	Office	Constituency	Party	Votes (Madan Rathore)	%	Opponent	Opponent Party	Votes	%	Result	Ref
2013	MLA	Sumerpur	Bharatiya Janata Party	86,210	56.63	Beena Kak	Indian National Congress	43,567	28.62	Won	
2003	MLA	Sumerpur	Bharatiya Janata Party	31,362	34.15	Beena Kak	Indian National Congress	28,699	31.25	Won	
