= Bhupender Yadav =

Indian politician (born 1969)

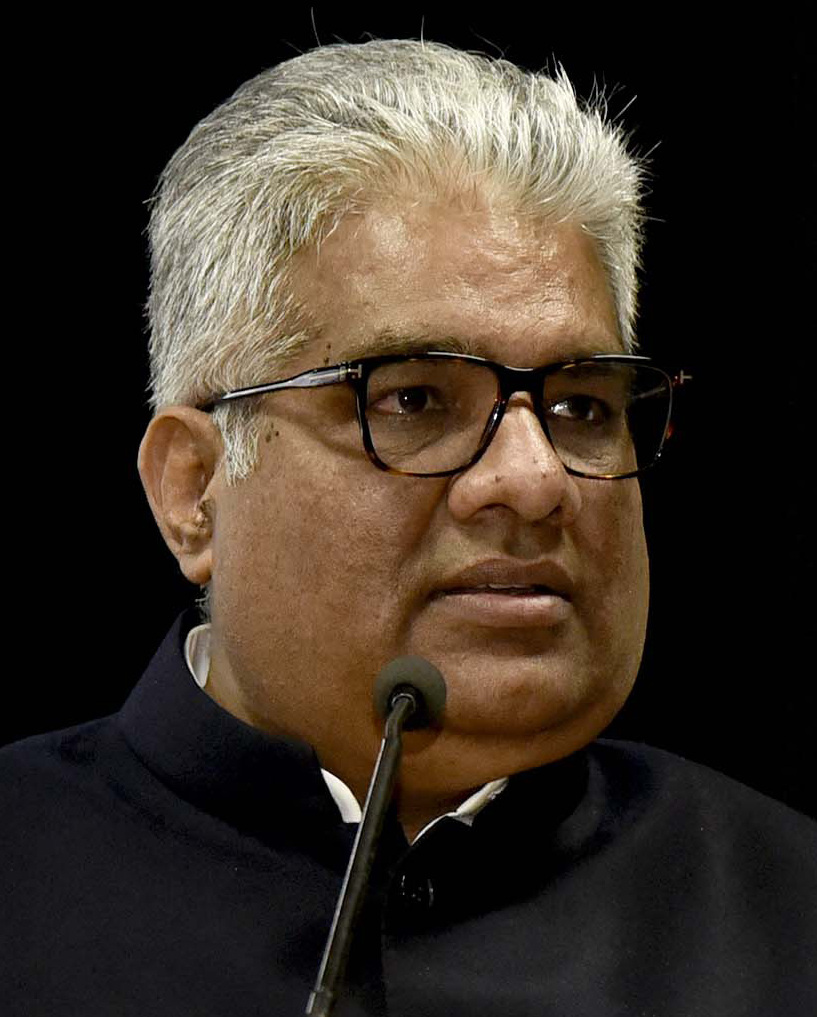
- Yadav in 2023

Union Minister of Environment, Forest and Climate Change
- Incumbent
- Assumed office 7 July 2021
- Prime Minister: Narendra Modi
- Preceded by: Prakash Javadekar

Union Minister of Labour and Employment
- In office 7 July 2021 – 10 June 2024
- Prime Minister: Narendra Modi
- Preceded by: Santosh Gangwar
- Succeeded by: Mansukh Mandviya

Member of Parliament, Lok Sabha
- Incumbent
- Assumed office 4 June 2024
- Preceded by: Mahant Balaknath
- Constituency: Alwar, Rajasthan

Member of Parliament, Rajya Sabha
- In office 4 April 2012 – 4 April 2024
- Preceded by: Ramdas Agarwal
- Succeeded by: Chunnilal Garasiya
- Constituency: Rajasthan

Personal details
- Born: 30 June 1969 (age 57) Ajmer, Rajasthan, India
- Party: Bharatiya Janata Party
- Spouse: Babita Yadav
- Education: B.A., LL. B.
- Website: bhupenderyadav.in

Bhupender Yadav (born 30 June 1969) is an Indian politician who is serving as the 20th Minister of Environment, Forest and Climate Change since 2024. He is a Member of Parliament, Lok Sabha from Alwar. He was a Member of Parliament in the Rajya Sabha, representing the state of Rajasthan, a position he has held since 2012. He was reelected in April 2018. He resigned from Rajya Sabha in 2024.

== Early life and career ==
Yadav was born in Ajmer, Rajasthan on 30 June 1969. He received his Bachelor's degree and Bachelor of Laws degree from Government College, Ajmer.

He started as a student union leader and in 2000, he was appointed the general secretary of the Akhil Bhartiya Adhivakta Parishad, a lawyers’ organization and held this position until 2009. Prior to beginning his political career, he was an Advocate in the Supreme Court and also served as Government Counsel for important Commissions. He was the government counsel for the Liberhan Commission which investigated the 1992 demolition of the Babri Masjid and the Justice Wadhwa Commission which investigated the murder of Australian missionary Graham Staines.

== Politics ==
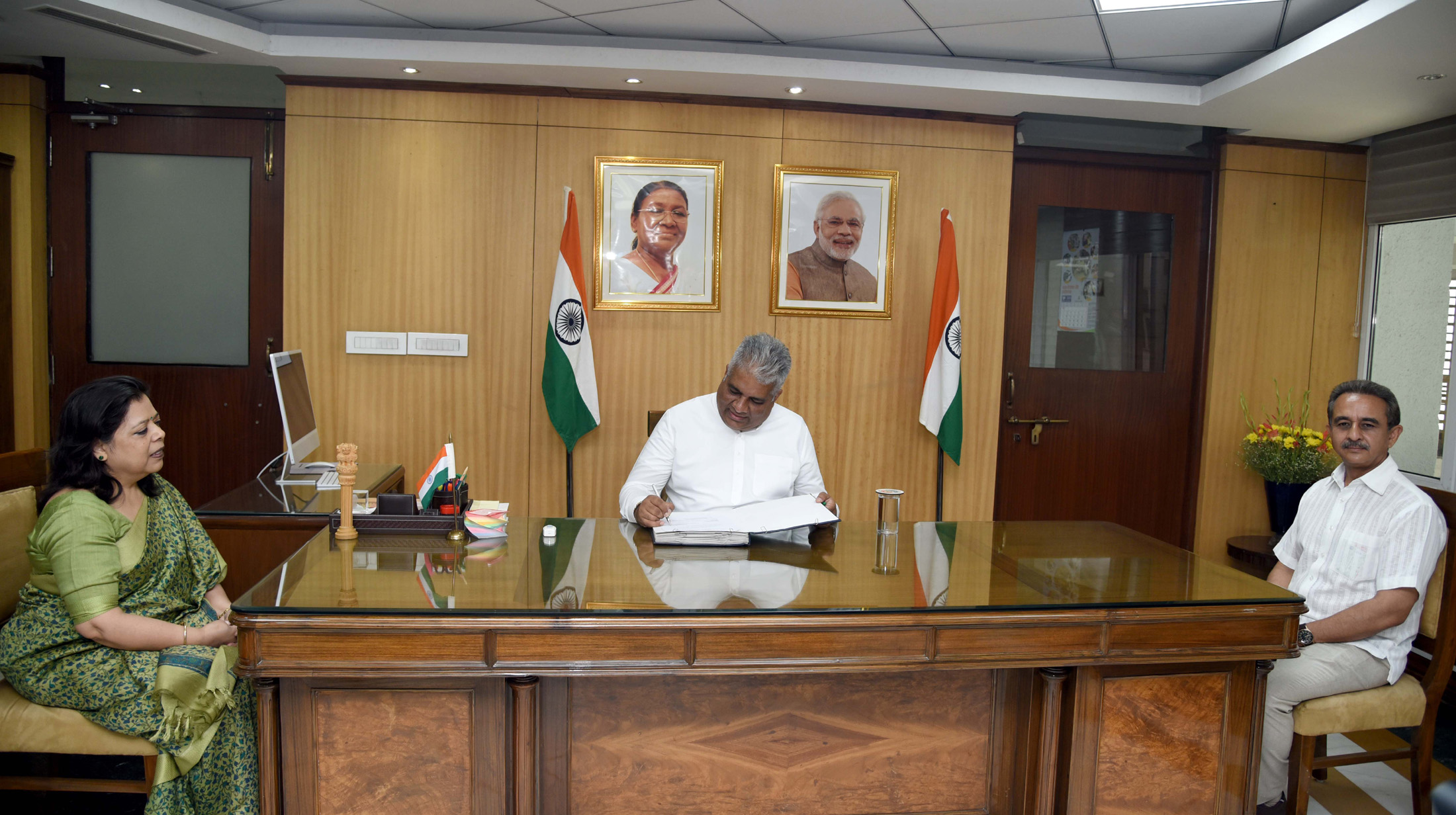
Yadav assuming charge as the Minister of Environment, Forest and Climate Change.

Yadav was appointed National Secretary of Bhartiya Janata Party in 2010 by Nitin Gadkari, the then national party President. On 4 April 2012 he was elected as a Member of Parliament, Rajya Sabha. He then took charge as the National General Secretary of the Bharatiya Janata Party in 2014. Yadav was the war room strategist behind securing convincing victories for his party in the assembly elections of Rajasthan (2013), Gujarat (2017), Jharkhand (2014) and Uttar Pradesh (2017). Yadav is the BJP's in-charge for the 2020 Bihar Legislative Assembly elections Madhya Pradesh 2023 state elections and BJP takes charge as state in-charge of West Bengal ahead of 2026 assembly elections. Central ministership: In July 2021, Yadav was inducted in the Modi Cabinet as a Cabinet Minister for Environment Forest & Climate Change and Labour & Employment. As the Minister of Environment Forest & Climate Change, he voiced India’s intervention to get the term ‘phase-out’ of coal changed to ‘phase-down’ in the final agreement of the 26th United Nations Conference of Parties (COP) in Glasgow. He stated that “developing countries have a right to their fair share of the global carbon budget and are entitled to the responsible use of fossil fuels.”

== Parliamentary committees ==
Yadav's reputation as an expert on parliamentary select committees has earned him the title of "Committee Man". Most notably, he was the Chairman of the Joint Committee on Insolvency and Bankruptcy Code, 2015, and the Chairman of the Rajya Sabha Select Committee of the GST Bill.

=== Joint Committee on Insolvency and Bankruptcy Code, 2015 ===
The Insolvency and Bankruptcy Code, 2016 ("IBC"), which came into effect on 28 May 2016, is considered as an important legislation for early detection of financial sickness of any corporate debtor and to deal with such sickness in a time bound manner by allowing the implementation of the effective resolution plan, if the same is viable. IBC sought to address the lacuna in the existing banking regime and provide a consolidated framework for the insolvency of companies, limited and unlimited liability partnerships, and individuals.

In January 2019, the Supreme Court of India upheld the Insolvency and Bankruptcy Code, 2016 in its entirety, tossing out a batch of petitions that had challenged the constitutional validity of several provisions, including the one that has barred the promoters of defaulting companies and “connected persons” from bidding for stressed assets. The Code is being hailed for providing a mechanism for time-bound recovery of dues from insolvent debtors in India and for contributing to the ease of doing business in India. In the World Bank's latest Doing Business Report (DBR, 2019), India has recorded a jump of 23 positions against its rank of 100 in 2017 to be placed now at 77th rank among 190 countries assessed. In 2014, India had dropped to a dismal 142nd rank in DBR.

The IBC Parliamentary Panel also pitched for faster and enhanced payment of workmen dues and employee wages in the corporate insolvency process.

=== Other committees ===
Yadav has chaired 12 Parliamentary committees, and been a member in multiple Parliamentary committees:

Parliamentary committee	Capacity	Duration/ time
Personnel, Public Grievances, Law and Justice, 2018	Chairman	September 2018 – Present
General Purposes Committee, 2018	Member	October 2018 – Present
Business Advisory Committee, 2018	Member	June 2018 – Present
Joint Committee on the Financial Resolution and Deposit Insurance Bill, 2017	Chairman	Aug 2017
Content Advisory Committee of Rajya Sabha Television	Member	May 2017
Select Committee of Rajya Sabha on the Constitution (One Hundred and Twenty Third Amendment) Bill, 2017	Chairman	April
Joint Parliamentary Committee on Security in Parliament House Complex	Member	Aug 2016
Committee on Public Accounts	Member	Aug 2016
Committee on Commerce Member, General Purposes Committee	Chairman	July 2016
Committee of Transport, Tourism and Culture	Member	July – Aug 2016
Joint Committee on the Enforcement of Security Interest and Recovery of Debts Laws and Miscellaneous Provisions (Amendment) Bill, 2016	Chairman	May – July 2016
Select Committee of Rajya Sabha on the Enemy Property (Amendment and Validation) Bill, 2016	Chairman	March – May 2016
Joint Committee on the Insolvency and Bankruptcy Code, 2015	Chairman	Jan – April 2016
Select Committee of Rajya Sabha on the Prevention of Corruption (Amendment) Bill, 2013	Chairman	Dec 2015 – Aug 2016
Select Committee of Rajya Sabha on the Constitution (One Hundred and Twenty Second Amendment) Bill, 2014	Chairman	May 2015 – July 2015
Select Committee of Rajya Sabha on the Mines and Minerals (Development and Regulation) Amendment Bill, 2015	Chairman	March 2015
Select Committee of Rajya Sabha on the Repealing and Amending Bill, 2014	Chairman	Dec 2014 – Feb 2015
Rajya Sabha Select Committee on GST Bill	Chairman	2014 – May 2015
Consultative Committee for the Ministry of Defence	Member	Sept 2014
Committee on Personnel, Public Grievances, Law and Justice	Member	Sept 2014 – July 2016
Committee on Subordinate Legislation	Member	Sept 2014 – July 2016
Committee on Industry	Member	Sept 2014 – July 2016
Business Advisory Committee	Member	June 2014
Select Committee of Rajya Sabha on the Lokpal and Lokayuktas Bill, 2011	Member	June 2012 – Nov 2012
Committee on Personnel, Public Grievances, Law and Justice	Member	May 2012 – May 2014
Committee on Subordinate Legislation	Member	May 2012 – May 2014
Ministry of Labour and Employment	Minister	7 July 2021 - June 2024
Minister of Environment, Forest and Climate Change	Minister	7 July 2021

== See also ==
- Third Modi ministry

Political offices
Preceded by Santosh Gangwar; Minister of State (Independent Charge)	Minister of Labour and Employment; 7 July 2021 - Incumbent	Incumbent
Preceded by Prakash Javadekar	Minister of Environment, Forest and Climate Change; 7 July 2021 - Incumbent	Incumbent
