= ABAP (disambiguation) =

ABAP is a programming language by SAP.

ABAP may also refer to:

- Akhil Bharatiya Adhivakta Parishad, association of lawyers in India
- Akhil Bharatiya Akhara Parishad, Hindu organisation in India
- American Beauty/American Psycho (AB/AP), album by Fall Out Boy
- Association of Boxing Alliances in the Philippines
