= Naunihal Singh =

Naunihal Singh may refer to:

- Naunihal Singh (politician) (1923–2009), Indian politician
- Naunihal Singh (academic), American political scientist
