= Johri Bazar (Rajasthan Assembly constituency) =

Former Assembly constituency in Rajasthan, India

- Former constituency for the Rajasthan Legislative Assembly

Constituency details
- Country: India
- Region: North India
- State: Rajasthan
- District: Jaipur district
- Lok Sabha constituency: Jaipur
- Established: 1956
- Abolished: 2008
- Reservation: None

Johri Bazar was a constituency of the Rajasthan Legislative Assembly used in the state elections between 1957 and 2003. It was one of constituencies of the state capital of Jaipur. The seat was won by Bharatiya Janata Party politician Kali Charan Saraf four times, Bharatiya Jana Sangh politician Satish Chandra Agarwal thrice, Indian National Congress politician Taqiuddin Ahmed twice whilst Communist Party of India leader Gaffar Ali once and Janata Party candidate Gul Mohammed once.

== History ==
Ahead of the 1952 Rajasthan Legislative Assembly election, three assembly constituencies were created for the state capital city of Jaipur. The Delimitation of Parliamentary and Assembly Constituencies Order, 1956 created new Legislative Assembly constituencies in Jaipur, creating the Johri Bazar seat as a single-member constituency. At the time of its creation the Johri Bazar constituency consisted of the Jaipur Municipality wards 3, 4, 5 and 10. The constituency was located in the north-eastern parts of the city. It had a mixed population, with some two-thirds of voters being Hindus and Jains, and the remaining third being Muslims. The Muslim community of Johri Bazar had settled in the city during the Mughal period, becoming involved in jewellery and stone-cutting trades. But among the Muslim voters there was also a significant number of cobblers and other workers from low-incomes trades. The Hindu community was also largely involved in commerce.

In the 1957 Rajasthan Legislative Assembly election the seat was won by the Hindu nationlist Bharatiya Jana Sangh, whose candidate Satish Chandra Agarwal defeated the Indian National Congress candidate Shah Alimuddin.

In the 1962 Rajasthan Legislative Assembly election fifteen candidates contested the Johri Bazar seat. However, the battle for the seat was primarily a triangular contest between the incumbent Jana Sangh legislator Agarwal, Congress and the Swatantra Party. The Congress Party opted to field Aminuddin, the Nawab of Loharu State, who had no prior electoral experience. Taqiuddin Ahmed, the son of Shah Alimuddin, had wished to run as the Congress candidate. After the Congress Party allotted the constituency to Aminuddin, Taqiuddin Ahmed became the Swatantra Party candidate. Agarwal managed to retain the seat, with Taqiuddin Ahmed finishing in second place and Aminuddin in third place.

Ahead of the 1967 Rajasthan Legislative Assembly election the constituencies in Jaipur went through redistricting, through the Delimitation of Parliamentary and Assembly Constituencies Order, 1966, which expanded the number of Jaipur city constituencies from three to four. The redrawn borders of the Johri Bazar constituency included the wards 13 to 21 and ward 32 of Jaipur Municipality (the ward organization of the city had also changed since the 1956 districting exercise). Agarwal won the Johri Bazar seat for a third time in a row in the 1967 polls.

In the 1970s and 1980s new slum areas emerged within the Johri Bazar constituency, such as Ram Nagar, Saraswati, Pahari and Ganpati. The squatters settling in the new slum areas were drawn to eastern Jaipur, to access the labour market emerging around construction work in the three middle class neighbourhoods Jawahar Nagar, Malvia Nagar and Raja Park. As the population of the constituency grew, an electorate with a significant Muslim population and mix between dominant middle-class areas, commercial areas and large slums became its defining characteristics of the constituency.

Ahead of the 1972 Rajasthan Legislative Assembly election, the Congress(R) formed an electoral alliance with the Communist Party of India (CPI). Johri Bazar was one of five assembly seats allocated for the CPI to contest with Congress(R) support. Both the Swatantra Party (who had won all Lok Sabha parliamentary elections in Jaipur since 1962, led by the erstwhile Maharani of Jaipur State Gayatri Devi) and the Jana Sangh (who had won the seat thrice) had high hopes to win the seat. CPI, on the other hand, lacked strong presence in the constituency. The CPI fielded its Jaipur unit secretary Gaffar Ali, a veteran of the Praja Mandal movement. Gaffar Ali won the contest, winning 45% of the vote. The Johri Bazar seat was again redistricted with the Delimitation of Parliamentary and Assembly Constituencies Order, 1976, whereby the Jaipur Municipality wards 21, 23, 27 and 30 were allocated to the Johri Bazar constituency. Gaffar Ali ran for re-election in the 1977 Rajasthan Legislative Assembly election, but was defeated by the Janata Party candidate Gul Mohammed.

Taqiuddin Ahmed, running as the Congress(I) candidate, won the Johri Bazar seat in the 1980 Rajasthan Legislative Assembly election as part of the Indira Gandhi resurgence nationwide. During the 1980s and 1990s the politics of Johri Bazar was dominated by the competition between Taqiuddin Ahmed and Kali Charan Saraf of the Bharatiya Janata Party (BJP, the successor part of the Jana Sangh). In 1985 Kali Charan Saraf won the Johri Bazar seat. Kali Charan Saraf, who became the state Law Minister, would held the seat until 1998 when Taqiuddin Ahmed recaptured it.

Ahead of the 2003 Rajasthan Legislative Assembly election, there was media reporting indicating that Kali Charan Saraf (now the BJP state treasurer) was seeking a ticket to contest another constituency, possibly the Jaipur Rural seat. On the Congress side there were tensions between potential candidates. Taqiuddin Ahmed wanted to run for re-election but Congress leader Sayyed Khan reported wanted Jaipur Stock Exchange chairman K.L. Jain to contest the Johri Bazar seat. Suraj Khatri, former joint secretary of the Rajasthan Pradesh Congress Committee, was another Congress heavyweight wanting the Johri Bazar ticket. In the end Sayyed Khan stood himself as the Congress candidate, but was defeated by Kali Charan Saraf. The Johri Bazar constituency disappeared 2008, one of 36 Rajasthan Legislative Assembly seats affected by a delimitation exercise.

== Members of the Legislative Assembly ==
Year	Name	Party
1957	Satish Chandra Agarwal	Bharatiya Jana Sangh
1962	Satish Chandra Agarwal	Bharatiya Jana Sangh
1967	Satish Chandra Agarwal	Bharatiya Jana Sangh
1972	Gaffar Ali	Communist Party of India
1977	Gul Mohammed	Janata Party
1980	Taqiuddin Ahmed	Indian National Congress
1985	Kali Charan Saraf	Bharatiya Janata Party
1990	Kali Charan Saraf	Bharatiya Janata Party
1993	Kali Charan Saraf	Bharatiya Janata Party
1998	Taqiuddin Ahmed	Indian National Congress
2003	Kali Charan Saraf	Bharatiya Janata Party

== Election results ==
=== 1957 ===
1957 Rajasthan Legislative Assembly election: Johri Bazar
Party	Candidate	Votes	%
ABJS	Satish Chandra Agarwal	7,565	42.53
INC	Shah Alimuddin	6,036	33.93
Independent	Gaffar Ali	2,197	12.35
PSP	Kaval Chand	1,286	7.23
Independent	Shyam Lal Varma	423	2.38
Independent	Arvind Kumar	282	1.59
Majority		1,529	8.59
Turnout		17,789	35.90
ABJS win (new seat)			

=== 1962 ===
1962 Rajasthan Legislative Assembly election: Johri Bazar
Party	Candidate	Votes	%	±%
ABJS	Satish Chandra Agarwal	17,207	39.60	−2.93
SWA	Taqiuddin Ahmed	11,686	26.89	
INC	Aminuddin	6,036	24.93	−9.00
Independent	M. R. Sethi	1,756	4.04	
Independent	Govind Narain Gour	401	0.92	
CPI	Kishan Kishore	217	0.50	
Independent	Pratap Chand	215	0.49	
Independent	Surriya Begum	213	0.49	
Independent	Lila Ram	211	0.49	
Independent	Gopal Dutt	175	0.40	
SOC	Gulab Chand	165	0.38	
Independent	Raj Bahadur	123	0.28	
Independent	Nirmal Dass	109	0.25	
Independent	Banshi Lal	83	0.14	
Independent	Brij Mohan	62	0.14	
Majority		5,521	12.70	+4.11
Turnout		43,456	64.93	+29.03
ABJS hold				

=== 1967 ===
1967 Rajasthan Legislative Assembly election: Johri Bazar
Party	Candidate	Votes	%	±%
ABJS	Satish Chandra Agarwal	21,586	60.69	+21.09
INC	B. Chand	13,056	36.71	+11.78
Independent	R. Shyam	509	1.43	
Independent	G. Rawat	416	1.17	
Majority		8,530	23.99	+11.28
Turnout		35,567	58.20	−6.73
ABJS hold				

=== 1972 ===
1972 Rajasthan Legislative Assembly election: Johri Bazar
Party	Candidate	Votes	%	±%
CPI	Gaffar Ali	20,182	45.40	
ABJS	Mehatab Chand	16,253	36.56	−24.13
SWA	Radhey Shyam Fatehpuria	5,849	13.16	
Independent	Kanhiya Lal	738	1.66	
Independent	Sambhu Lal	633	1.42	
Independent	Babu Ran Singh	429	0.96	
Independent	Raghu Veer Singh	292	0.66	
Independent	Shiv Prasad Bindal	80	0.18	
Majority		3,929	8.84	−15.15
Turnout		44,456	58.20	+2.02
CPI gain from ABJS				

=== 1977 ===
1977 Rajasthan Legislative Assembly election: Johri Bazar
Party	Candidate	Votes	%	±%
JP	Gul Mohammed	26,535	60.57	
CPI	Gaffar Ali	8,714	19.89	−25.51
IUML	Moinuddin Keri	6,156	14.05	
Independent	Rajendra Kumar Shekhar	1,101	2.51	
Independent	Shyam Das	487	1.11	
Independent	Vimal Choudhary	220	0.50	
Independent	Kanta	160	0.37	
Independent	Mohammed Sayeed Khan	155	0.35	
Independent	Jagat Pal Singh	151	0.34	
Independent	Krishna Kumar	131	0.30	
Majority		17,821	40.68	+31.84
Turnout		43,810	45.31	−12.89
JP gain from CPI				

=== 1980 ===
1980 Rajasthan Legislative Assembly election: Johri Bazar
Party	Candidate	Votes	%	±%
INC(I)	Taqiuddin Ahmed	26,225	45.71	
BJP	Shikhar Chand	24,590	42.86	
CPI	Gaffar Ali	2,686	4.68	−15.21
INC(U)	Chuttan Lal	874	1.52	
Janata Party (Secular) - Ch. Charan Singh	Satya Vrat	824	1.44	
Janata Party (JP)	Chandra Singh	528	0.92	−59.65
Independent	Udai Narain Gupta	450	0.78	
Independent	Sahahbuddin Gori	299	0.52	
Independent	Kailash Chandra Gupta	224	0.39	
Independent	Shyam Lal	191	0.33	
Independent	Nazriruddin	135	0.24	
Independent	Gul Mohammed	97	0.17	
Independent	Mohammed Sayeed Khan	64	0.11	−0.24
Independent	Madan Lal	52	0.09	
Independent	Syad Hussain	51	0.09	
Independent	A. Sami Siddiki	50	0.09	
Independent	Mohammed Ibrahim	27	0.05	
Majority		1,635	2.85	−37.83
Turnout		57,367	46.12	+0.81
INC(I) gain from JP				

=== 1985 ===
1985 Rajasthan Legislative Assembly election: Johri Bazar
Party	Candidate	Votes	%	±%
BJP	Kali Charan Saraf	28,198	42.86	−0.59
INC	Taqiuddin Ahmed	25,646	38.45	−7.26
Independent	Ahmed Bux	8,612	12.91	
Independent	Panchu Ram Bairwa	1,441	2.16	
CPI(M)	Praveen Chand Jain	1,059	1.59	
Independent	Gordhan Lal Sharma	270	0.40	
Independent	Babu Lal	219	0.33	
Independent	M. Ibrahim Khan	192	0.29	
IC(S)	Abdul Ghafoor	177	0.27	
Independent	Udai Narain Gupta	157	0.24	−0.54
Independent	Jaswant Singh	127	0.19	
Independent	Vishnu Sharma	110	0.16	
Independent	Kana Ram	102	0.15	
Independent	Mohammed Sayeed Khan	101	0.15	+0.04
Independent	Hira Chand Jain	71	0.11	
LKD	Gul Mohammed	59	0.09	
Independent	Mohammed Fayyajuddin Quershi	54	0.08	
Independent	R. K. Gandhi	48	0.07	
Independent	Mohammed Hanif	36	0.05	
Independent	Anil Shah	29	0.04	
Majority		2,552	3.82	+0.97
Turnout		66,708	42.52	−3.60
BJP gain from INC				

=== 1990 ===
1990 Rajasthan Legislative Assembly election: Johri Bazar
Party	Candidate	Votes	%	±%
BJP	Kali Charan Saraf	61,132	58.86	+16.00
INC	Sayed Khan	36,257	34.91	−3.54
Janata Party (JP)	Goverdhan Das Thakwabi	1,434	1.38	
BSP	Amba Prasad	1,272	1.22	
Doordarshi Party	Ramawatar Jamid	470	0.45	
INS(SCS)	Daya Shanker Mishra	265	0.26	
Independent	Prathvi Raj Bhartiya	260	0.25	
Independent	Sarwan Singh Shekhavat	223	0.21	
Independent	Sobhag Singh Gill	209	0.20	
Independent	Dilip Kumar Joshi	207	0.20	
Independent	Tikam Chand Chaudhury	197	0.19	
Independent	Ram Swaroop Agarwal	193	0.19	
Independent	Tara Chand Jain	171	0.16	
Independent	Inder Singh	158	0.15	
Independent	Gurmej Singh	120	0.12	
Independent	Jai Dev	117	0.11	
Independent	Santosh Chand	117	0.11	
Independent	Sudhir Prasad Boda 'Susu'	102	0.10	
Independent	Jagdish Jaiman	97	0.09	
AIFB	Jai Singh Rajourita	96	0.09	
Independent	Abdul Gafur	81	0.08	
Independent	Shirfudin	78	0.08	
Independent	Punam Chand Bhandrari	76	0.07	
Independent	Jagdish Painiwal	75	0.07	
Independent	Radhey Shyam Jangam	61	0.06	
Independent	Ved Prakash	60	0.06	
Independent	Mohammad Rafik	60	0.06	
Independent	Matish Ahmad	54	0.05	
Independent	Madhvender Mumar Sharma	52	0.05	
Independent	Praveen Kumar Chhabra	49	0.05	
Independent	Sadir	48	0.05	
Independent	Panu Ram	39	0.04	
Independent	Sharda	23	0.02	
Majority		24,875	23.95	+20.13
Turnout		103,853	45.70	+3.18
BJP hold				

=== 1993 ===
1993 Rajasthan Legislative Assembly election: Johri Bazar
Party	Candidate	Votes	%	±%
BJP	Kali Charan Saraf	71,017	56.16	−2.70
INC	Raj Kumar Kala	47,685	37.71	+2.80
JD	Nizamuddin	4,384	3.47	
Independent	Bansilal	747	0.59	
Independent	R. K. Azad	528	0.42	
Independent	Abdul Lateef	396	0.31	
Independent	Mohammad Sabir	303	0.24	
SS	Narendra Antani	272	0.22	
Doordarshi Party	Madhu Bala Pareek	196	0.15	−0.30
AIFB	Chotu Ram	141	0.11	+0.02
IUML	Sharafuddin	141	0.11	
Independent	Raj Kumar Jain	136	0.11	
Independent	Bhagwan Das	118	0.09	
Independent	Ramesh Dadhich	93	0.07	
Independent	Natwarlal Jain	90	0.07	
Independent	Dev Das Pamnani	89	0.07	
Independent	Raju Singh	82	0.06	
Independent	Sunil Kumar Rajgariya	38	0.03	
Majority		23,332	18.45	−5.50
Turnout		126,456	56.65	+10.95
BJP hold				

=== 1998 ===
1998 Rajasthan Legislative Assembly election: Johri Bazar
Party	Candidate	Votes	%	±%
INC	Taqiuddin Ahmed	70,208	48.86	+11.15
BJP	Kali Charan Saraf	67,095	46.69	−9.47
Independent	Sandeep Saxena	2,195	1.53	
BSP	Narender	1,385	0.96	
SP	Prem Chand	994	0.69	
JD	Nizamuddin Pathan	771	0.54	−2.93
SS	Nand Lal	484	0.34	+0.12
SAP	Hira Lal	301	0.21	
LKD	Iftikar Qureshi	262	0.18	
Majority		3,113	2.17	−16.28
Turnout		143,695	49.16	−7.49
INC gain from BJP				

=== 2003 ===
2003 Rajasthan Legislative Assembly election: Johri Bazar
Party	Candidate	Votes	%	±%
BJP	Kali Charan Saraf	88,016	54.14	+7.45
INC	Shah Ikramuddin	62,277	38.31	−10.55
Rajasthan Samajik Nyaya Manch	Somendra Sharma	4,344	2.67	
Independent	Sita Ram Jaiswal	2,187	1.35	
BSP	Mohan Keswani	1,573	0.97	+0.01
SS	Balbeer Singh	964	0.59	+0.25
RJD	Seeraj Mohammed	573	0.35	
Independent	Ram Vilas Modi	550	0.34	
NCP	Shahbuddin	507	0.31	
Independent	Jagdish Jareda (Meena)	473	0.29	
Independent	Yogesh Kumar	390	0.24	
Independent	Keshav Dev Gaur	272	0.17	
SP	Rahees Mohammed	241	0.15	−0.54
JP	Sabeer Khan	212	0.13	
Majority		26,739	1.58	−0.59
Turnout		162,579	58.13	+8.97
BJP gain from INC				
