= Bhanwar Lal Sharma (politician) =

Indian politician (1924–2020)

Bhanwar Lal Sharma (BJP leader)

Member of the Rajasthan Legislative Assembly
- In office 1977–2003
- Preceded by: Girdhari Lal Bhargava
- Succeeded by: Surendra Pareek
- Constituency: Hawa Mahal

Cabinet Minister, Government of Rajasthan
- In office 8 February 1978 – 16 February 1980
- Chief Minister: Bhairon Singh Shekhawat
- Ministries and Departments: Education; Minority Affairs; Language and Library; Urban & Housing Development; Self-governance Unit
- In office 4 March 1990 – 14 December 1992
- Chief Minister: Bhairon Singh Shekhawat
- Ministries and Departments: Sports Department; Self-governance Unit; Urban & Housing Development; Public Health Engineering
- In office 11 December 1993 – 30 November 1998
- Chief Minister: Bhairon Singh Shekhawat
- Ministries and Departments: Youth Affairs and Sports; Ground Water Department; Public Health Engineering; Urban & Housing Development; Self-governance Unit

President, Bharatiya Janata Party, Rajasthan
- In office 1986–1987
- Preceded by: Hari Shankar Bhabhra
- Succeeded by: Lalit Kishore Chaturvedi
- In office 1989–1990
- Preceded by: Lalit Kishore Chaturvedi
- Succeeded by: Ramdas Agarwal

Personal details
- Born: 22 November 1924 Jaipur, Rajasthan, British India
- Died: 29 May 2020 (aged 95) Jaipur, Rajasthan, India
- Party: Bharatiya Janata Party
- Spouse: Premkanta
- Children: 3 sons and 2 daughters
- Parent: Nand Kishore Sharma (father)
- Education: B.A., LL.B
- Alma mater: S.S.G. Pareek College, Jaipur
- Profession: Politician

Bhanwar Lal Sharma (22 November 1924 – 29 May 2020) was an Indian politician and senior leader of the Bharatiya Janata Party (BJP) in Rajasthan. He was a six-time elected Member of the Rajasthan Legislative Assembly from the Hawa Mahal constituency in Jaipur and held several cabinet portfolios in the Government of Rajasthan under Chief Minister Bhairon Singh Shekhawat.

He served as the President of the BJP’s Rajasthan unit three times and played a key role in strengthening the party organization during the 1980s and 1990s.

== Political career ==
Bhanwar Lal Sharma began his political career during the Janata Party era and was first elected to the Rajasthan Legislative Assembly in 1977. He went on to represent the Hawa Mahal constituency for six consecutive terms until 2003.

He was considered a close aide of Bhairon Singh Shekhawat and served in key ministerial roles during Shekhawat's tenure as Chief Minister. Sharma handled important departments such as Education, Urban Development, Self-Governance, Public Health Engineering, and Sports across different terms between 1978 and 1998.

As a senior organizational leader in the BJP, Sharma served as the President of BJP Rajasthan in 1986–87, again in 1989–90, and once more briefly in the early 1990s.

His long tenure and organizational leadership earned him recognition as a seasoned political strategist within the party, particularly in Jaipur and central Rajasthan.

== Death ==
Bhanwar Lal Sharma died on 29 May 2020 in Jaipur at the age of 95.
