= Udaipur Rural Assembly constituency =

Legislative Assembly constituency in Rajasthan State, India

Coordinates: 24.49°N 73.84°E

Udaipur Rural
- Constituency No. 152 for the Rajasthan Legislative Assembly

Constituency details
- Country: India
- Region: North India
- State: Rajasthan
- District: Udaipur
- Lok Sabha constituency: Udaipur
- Established: 1977
- Total electors: 285,214
- Reservation: ST

Member of Legislative Assembly
- 16th Rajasthan Legislative Assembly
- Incumbent Phool Singh Meena
- Party: Bharatiya Janata Party

Udaipur Rural Assembly constituency is one of the 200 Legislative Assembly constituencies of Rajasthan state in India.

It comprises parts of Girwa tehsil, in Udaipur district and is reserved for candidates belonging to the Scheduled Tribes. As of 2023, its representative is Phool Singh Meena of the Bharatiya Janata Party.

== Members of the Legislative Assembly ==
Election	Member	Party
1977	Nand Lal	Janata Party
1980	Bheru Lal	Indian National Congress
1985	Khem Raj Katara	Indian National Congress
1990	Chunnilal Garasiya	Bharatiya Janata Party
1993	Chunnilal Garasiya	Bharatiya Janata Party
1998	Khem Raj Katara	Indian National Congress
2003	Vandna Meena	Bharatiya Janata Party
2008	Sajjan Katara	Indian National Congress
2013	Phool Singh Meena	Bharatiya Janata Party
2018	Phool Singh Meena	Bharatiya Janata Party
2023	Phool Singh Meena	Bharatiya Janata Party

== Election results ==
=== 2023 ===
2023 Rajasthan Legislative Assembly election: Udaipur Rural
Party	Candidate	Votes	%	±%
BJP	Phool Singh Meena	103,039	48.03	−3.34
INC	Vivek Katara	75,694	35.28	−6.22
BAP	Amit Kumar Kharadi	25,172	11.73	
BSP	Khemaraj Katara	2,173	1.01	+0.09
CPI	Gebi Lal Damor	1,963	0.91	−1.23
NOTA	None of the above	2,703	1.26	−0.91
Majority		27,345	12.75	+2.88
Turnout		214,545	75.22	+1.5
BJP hold		Swing		

=== 2018 ===
2018 Rajasthan Legislative Assembly election: Udaipur Rural
Party	Candidate	Votes	%	±%
BJP	Phool Singh Meena	97,382	51.37	
INC	Vivek Katara	78,675	41.5	
CPI	Ghanshyam Singh Tawar	4,055	2.14	
BMP	Prabhu Lal Meena	2,092	1.1	
BSP	Laxman	1,737	0.92	
NOTA	None of the above	4,108	2.17	
Majority		18,707	9.87	
Turnout		189,570	73.72	

== See also ==
- List of constituencies of the Rajasthan Legislative Assembly
- Udaipur district
