= Chandra Prakash Joshi =

Indian politician

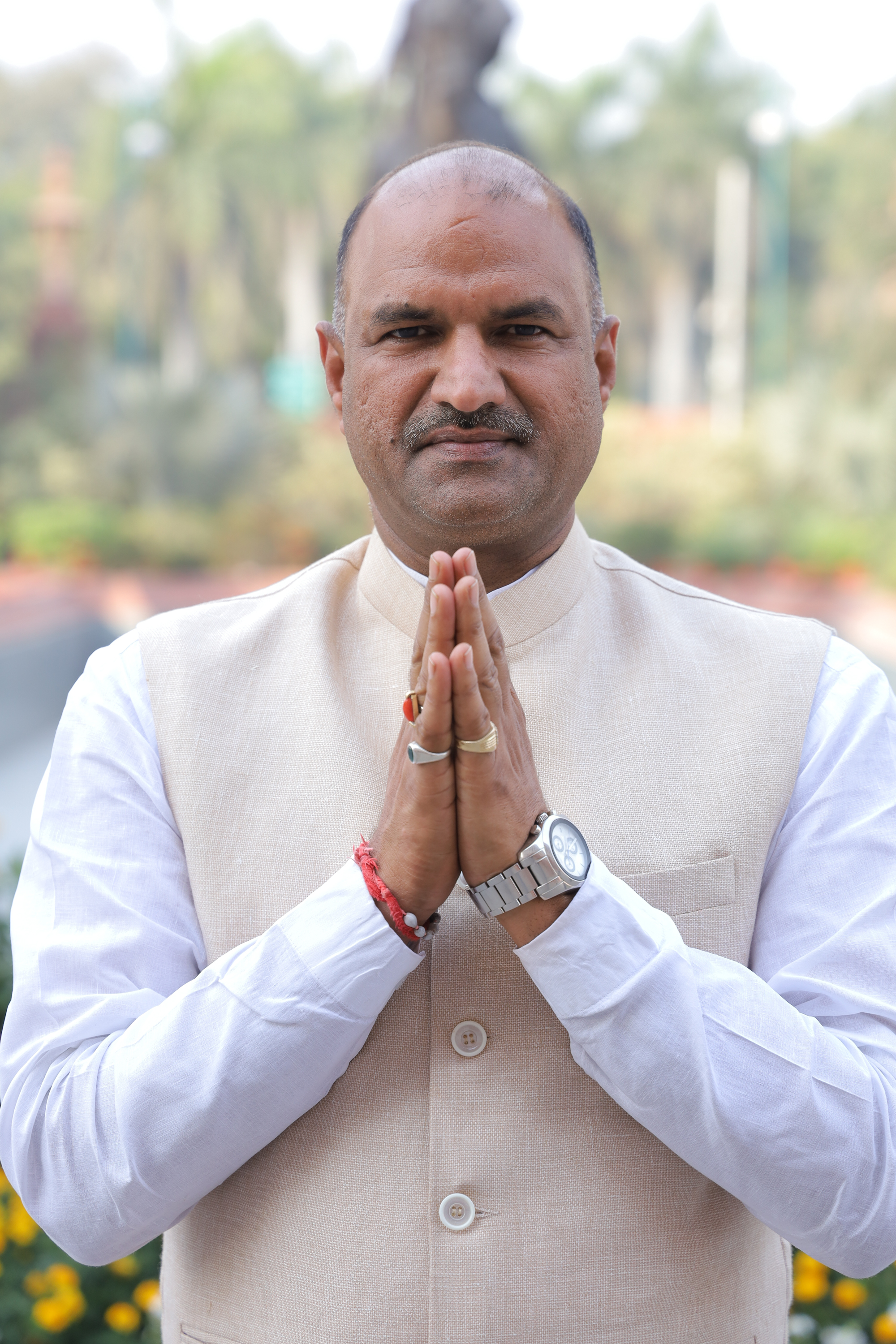

Member of Parliament, Lok Sabha
- Incumbent
- Assumed office 5 June 2014
- Preceded by: Girija Vyas
- Constituency: Chittorgarh

President, Bharatiya Janata Party, Rajasthan
- In office 23 March 2023 – 25 July 2024
- Preceded by: Satish Poonia
- Succeeded by: Madan Rathore

Personal details
- Born: 4 November 1975 (age 50) Chittorgarh, Rajasthan, India
- Spouse: Jyotsana Joshi
- Children: 2
- As of 24 March, 2023

Chandra Prakash Joshi (born 4 November 1975; Hindi pronunciation: [t͡ʃən̪d̪ɾə pɾəkaːʃ d͡ʒoːʃiː]) is an Indian politician and a member of parliament to the 17th Lok Sabha from Chittorgarh Lok Sabha constituency, elected for the first time in 2014. He was made the state president of the Bharatiya Janata Party in Rajasthan in 2023. He comes from an RSS background.

== Positions held ==
He worked as a State President of the Bharatiya Janata Yuva Morcha. Former State President of the Bharatiya Janata Party, Rajasthan.
