= Gaffar Ali =

Mohammed Gaffar Ali was an Indian lawyer and politician, belonging to the Communist Party of India (CPI). He was a leading figure of the Praja Mandal movement for democratic reforms in Jaipur State, and would later lead the CPI organization in Jaipur city. Gaffar Ali was a member of the Rajasthan Legislative Assembly 1972–1977.

== Biography ==
Gaffar Ali was born in Jaipur around 1915–1916, the son of Haji Ashiq Ali. His family originally hailed from Kakori. Gaffar Ali received primary education in Urdu, Hindi and English, and graduated with B.A. degree from Jaipur and a LL.B. degree from Lucknow.

In 1938 Gaffar Ali took part in the founding of the Jaipur State Praja Mandal. He was a member of the Praja Mandal Working Committee. He was a student movement leader at the time. It was generally uncommon for Muslims to be associated with the Praja Mandal movement, and Gaffar Ali would later recount hostile attitudes from the community on his involvement with the movement. Gaffar Ali began practising law in 1939.

He would be active in the organization of the Railway Workers Union and the Metal Industries Workers Unions and mobilization of Harijans. In 1946 he was detained for two months, for his role in the labour movement.

Within CPI in the 1940s, Gaffar Ali was part of the internal minority tendency that opposed the party line on the Pakistan question. He was a critic of the Muslim League and vociferously argued against the notion that religion could function as the foundation of nationhood.

Gaffar Ali stood as the CPI candidate in the Jaipur City A seat in the 1952 Rajasthan Legislative Assembly election. He finished in fifth place with 510 votes (4.44%). In the 1957 Rajasthan Legislative Assembly election he contested on an independent ticket in the Johri Bazar constituency, finishing in third place with 2,197 votes (12.35%).

As of the 1960s, Gaffar Ali was the secretary of the CPI Jaipur City Committee. He was a councillor of the Jaipur Municipal Corporation.

Ahead of the 1972 Rajasthan Legislative Assembly election, the Congress(R) allocated five seats to CPI to contest. Gaffar Ali stood as the CPI candidate in the Johri Bazar constituency and won the seat - obtaining 20,182 votes (45.40%). The election of Gaffar Ali surprised other political actors, as the Johri Bazar area was not seen as a CPI stronghold. The constituency had been held by the Hindu nationalist Jan Sangh since 1957, whilst Jaipur city overall was perceived as a Swatantra Party bastion. In the mid-1970s Gaffar Ali was included in a subcommittee of the CPI Central Executive Council on the Muslim question.

At the end of his tenure as legislator, he ran for re-election in the 1977 Rajasthan Legislative Assembly election but lost the seat. He finished in second place with 8,714 votes (19.89%).

He again contested the Johri Bazar seat in the 1980 Rajasthan Legislative Assembly election, finishing in third place with 2,686 votes (4.68%). The CPI again fielded Gaffar Ali as a candidate in the 1990 Rajasthan Legislative Assembly election, along with other party veterans. Gaffar Ali contested the Kishanpole seat, finishing in fourth place with 2,530 votes (2.79%).

Gaffar Ali died in Jaipur on January 3, 2002.
