= Phool Singh Meena =

Indian politician

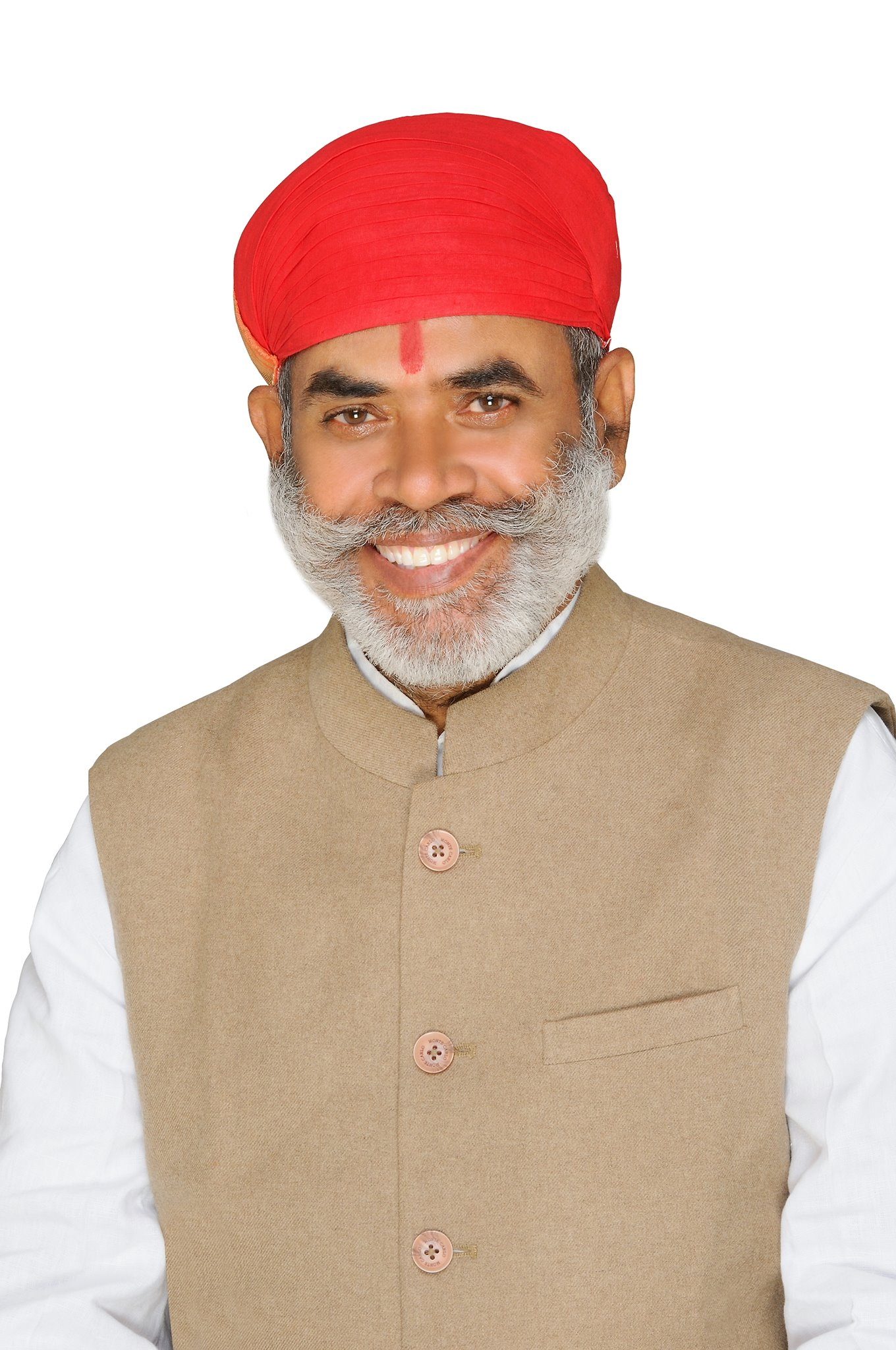

Member of the Rajasthan Legislative Assembly
- Incumbent
- Assumed office 2013
- Preceded by: Sajjan Katara
- Constituency: Udaipur Rural

Personal details
- Born: 15 August 1959 (age 66) Gadoli, Bhilwara, India
- Party: Bharatiya Janata Party
- Occupation: Politician

Phool Singh Meena is an Indian politician from the Bharatiya Janata Party and a member of the Rajasthan Legislative Assembly representing the Udaipur Rural.

== Early life ==
Phool Singh Meena was born on 15 August 1959 in a family of Pratihar Meenas in Gadoli, Jahazpur, Bhilwara.

== Assets and liabilities ==
Assets: Rs 17,134,007 ~10 million+ Liabilities: Rs 1,218,559 ~1.2 million+. He is the owner of Pro Pratihaar Company and Counsellor Municipal Corporation & Social Service.
