= Mangloona =

Mangloona Magloona
- village
- Location in Rajasthan, India Mangloona (India)
- Coordinates: 27.73°N 74.78°E
- Country: India
- State: Rajasthan
- District: Sikar
- Elevation: 337 m (1,106 ft)

Languages
  - Official: Hindi
- Time zone: UTC+5:30 (IST)
- ISO 3166 code: RJ-IN

Mangloona is a village in Laxmangarh tehsil in Sikar district, Rajasthan. It is situated on Laxmangarh to Salasar Road near the border of Churu district. The village is the birthplace of Swami Keshwanand, a freedom fighter.
