= Gulab Singh Rajpurohit =

Indian politician

Member of Rajasthan Legislative Assembly
- In office 1990–1993
- Constituency: Sumerpur (Rajasthan Assembly constituency)

Personal details
- Party: Bharatiya Janata Party
- Occupation: Politician
- Profession: Politician

Gulab singh Rajpurohit is an Indian politician from the Bharatiya Janata Party representing the Sumerpur (Rajasthan Assembly constituency) from Rajasthan. He also won the election in 1990 and 1993 from the same Sumerpur constituency of Rajasthan from the BJP ticket.
