= Sumerpur Assembly constituency =

Legislative Assembly constituency in Rajasthan State, India

Coordinates: 25.15°N 73.09°E

Sumerpur
- Constituency No. 121 for the Rajasthan Legislative Assembly

Constituency details
- Country: India
- Region: North India
- State: Rajasthan
- District: Pali
- Lok Sabha constituency: Pali
- Established: 1962
- Total electors: 311,205
- Reservation: None

Member of Legislative Assembly
- 16th Rajasthan Legislative Assembly
- Incumbent Joraram Kumawat
- Party: Bharatiya Janata Party
- Elected year: 2023

Sumerpur Assembly constituency is one of the 200 Legislative Assembly constituencies of Rajasthan state in India. It is in Pali district.

== Members of the Legislative Assembly ==
Year	Name	Party
1962	Aldaram M.	Indian National Congress
1967	P. Bafna	Swatantra Party
1972	Sajjan singh	Indian National Congress
1977	Vigyan Modi	Janata Party
1980	Gokul Chandra Sharma	Indian National Congress
1985	Bina Kak	Indian National Congress
1990	Gulab Singh Rajpurohit	Bharatiya Janata Party
1993	Bina Kak	Indian National Congress
1998	Bina Kak	Indian National Congress
2003	Madan Rathore	Bharatiya Janata Party
2008	Bina Kak	Indian National Congress
2013	Madan Rathore	Bharatiya Janata Party
2018	Joraram Kumawat	Bharatiya Janata Party
2023	Joraram Kumawat	Bharatiya Janata Party

== Election results ==
=== 2023 ===
2023 Rajasthan Legislative Assembly election: Sumerpur
Party	Candidate	Votes	%	±%
BJP	Joraram Kumawat	104,044	54.05	▼1.52
INC	Harishankar Mewara	76,662	39.83	▲3.2
BSP	Jeevaram Ram	3,003	1.56	▲0.31
RLP	Hariram Ghanchi	1,812	0.94	
NOTA	None of the above	2,290	1.19	▲0.84
Majority		27,382	14.22	▼4.72
Turnout		192,486	61.85	▲0.6
BJP hold		Swing	▼4.72	

=== 2018 ===
2018 Rajasthan Legislative Assembly election: Sumerpur
Party	Candidate	Votes	%	±%
BJP	Joraram Kumawat	96,617	55.57	
INC	Ranju Ramawat	63,685	36.63	
Independent	Nonji	2,766	1.59	
BSP	Surendra Parmar	2,178	1.25	
Independent	Bhanwar Singh Jodha	1,797	1.03	
NOTA	None of the above	613	0.35	
Majority		32,932	18.94	
Turnout		173,853	61.25	
BJP hold		Swing	▼9.04	

=== 2013 ===
2013 Rajasthan Legislative Assembly election: Sumerpur
Party	Candidate	Votes	%	±%
BJP	Madan Rathore	86,210	56.63%	+25.90%
INC	Beena Kak	43,567	28.62%	−9.97%
NPP	Hanuman Bhati	8,905	5.85%	N/A
NOTA	None of the Above	3,186	2.09%	+2.09%
BSP	Narendra Kumar	2,274	1.49%	−0.25%
Independent	Shankarlal Narban	1,128	0.74%	N/A
Independent	Bhanwar Singh Jodha	789	0.52%	N/A
Majority		42,648	28.01%	20.15%
Turnout		1,52,245	61.21%	+11.46%
BJP gain from INC		Swing	▲28.01	

=== 2008 ===
2008 Rajasthan Legislative Assembly election: Sumerpur
Party	Candidate	Votes	%	±%
INC	Beena Kak	43,268	38.59%	+7.34%
BJP	Shankar Singh Rajpurohit	34,451	30.73%	−2.42%
LJP	Gokul Chandra Sharma	4,013	3.58%	N/A
BSP	Jagdishpal Singh Ranawat	2,068	1.84%	N/A
SS	Jaidev Singh	4,427	3.40%	N/A
NCP	Bastimal	840	0.75%	N/A
RJVP	Hiralal Garg	689	0.61%	N/A
ABHM	Mangal Das Vaishnav	450	0.40%	N/A
Majority		8,817	7.86%	+4.96%
Turnout		1,12,125	50.75%	−7.59%
INC gain from BJP		Swing	▲7.86	

== See also ==
- List of constituencies of the Rajasthan Legislative Assembly
- Pali district
