= Neeraj Dangi =

Indian politician

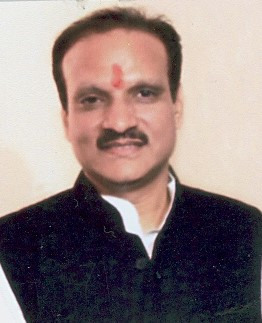
- Neeraj Dangi

Member of Parliament, Rajya Sabha
- Incumbent
- Assumed office 19 June 2020
- Preceded by: Vijay Goel
- Constituency: Rajasthan

Personal details
- Born: 4 February 1970 (age 56) Jaipur, Rajasthan, India
- Party: Indian National Congress
- Children: Yuvan Dangi & Katyayani Dangi
- Education: Bachelor of Engineering in (Civil Branch.), National Institute of Technology Karnataka, Surathkal, Mangalore (Karnataka). 1989–1993

Neeraj Dangi (born 4 November 1970) is an Indian politician from Rajasthan. He was elected to the Rajya Sabha, upper house of the Parliament of India from Rajasthan in the June 2026 Rajya sabha elections as an Indian National Congress candidate.

He was the Rajya Sabha MP in the previous term from June 2020 as well.

Neeraj Dangi is son of Late Dinesh Dangi, ex-Minister of State (Rajasthan).

Dangi has been nominated along with 06 others in the list for Rajya Sabha bye-elections in June 2026.

== Political life ==
He has been associated with Congress for the last 25 years. At present, he is the General Secretary of Rajasthan Pradesh Congress Committee.

Neeraj Dangi, completed his degree in Civil Engineering from National Institute of Technology Karnataka.

== Present Post ==
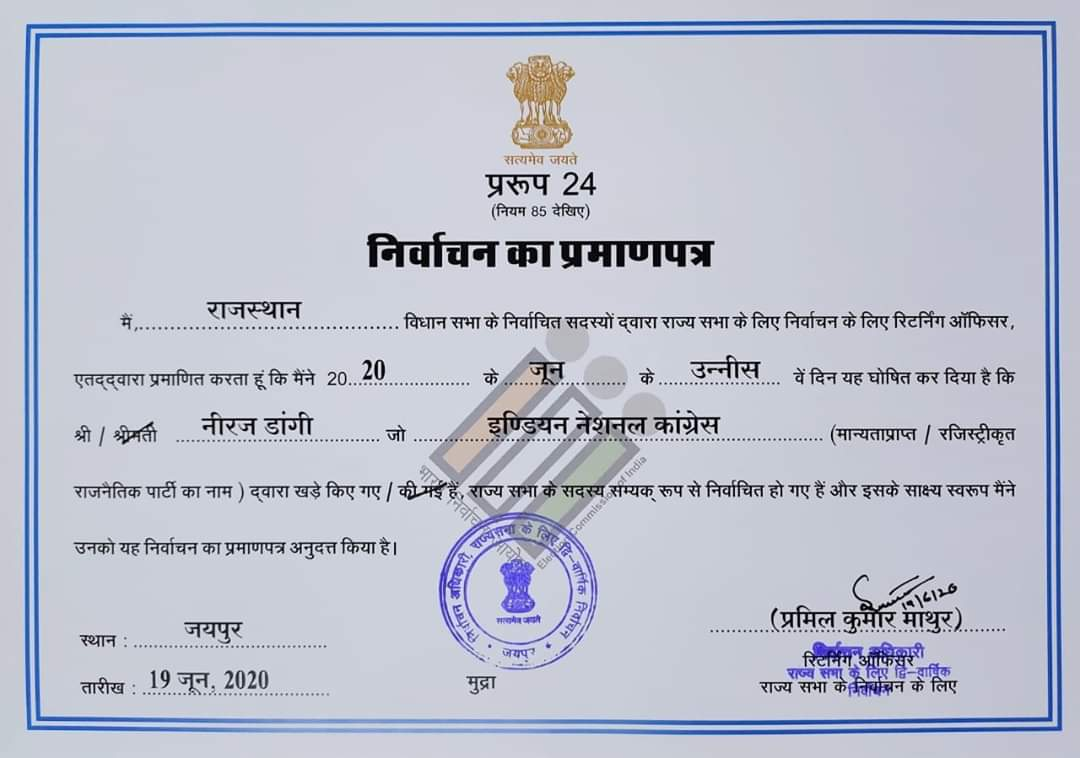

- Member of Parliament (Rajya Sabha) from Rajasthan – Elected on 19 June 2020
- General Secretary, PCC, Rajasthan – appointed on 29 November 2014
- AICC Member – appointed on 15 March 2018

== Previously held posts ==
- AICC Observer for Maharashtra Assembly Elections 2019 for Vile Parle (167) Assembly segment, Mumbai – in Oct. 2019
- Member, Campaign Committee Rajasthan for Loksabha Elections 2019 – appointed by AICC on 4 February 2019
- Congress Candidate, Reodar-148 (S.C.) Assembly Constituency Distt. Sirohi, Rajasthan (15th Assembly Elections-2018)
- AICC Member – from Feb 2004 to Oct 2010
- Congress Candidate, Reodar-148 (S.C.) Assembly Constituency Distt. Sirohi, Rajasthan (13th Assembly Elections-2008) – Lost by 3,238 votes only.
- Congress Candidate, Desuri-163 (S.C.) Assembly Constituency Distt. Pali, Rajasthan (12th Assembly Elections-2003) – Lost by 633 votes only.
