= Krishan Lal Balmiki =

Member of the Parliament of India (1942–2010)

Krishan Lal Balmiki (Hindi: कृष्ण लाल वाल्मीकि) (10 July 1942 – 21 April 2010) was an Indian politician of the Bharatiya Janata Party and was a member of the Parliament of India representing Rajasthan in the Rajya Sabha, the upper house of the Indian Parliament.
