= Bhuvnesh Chaturvedi =

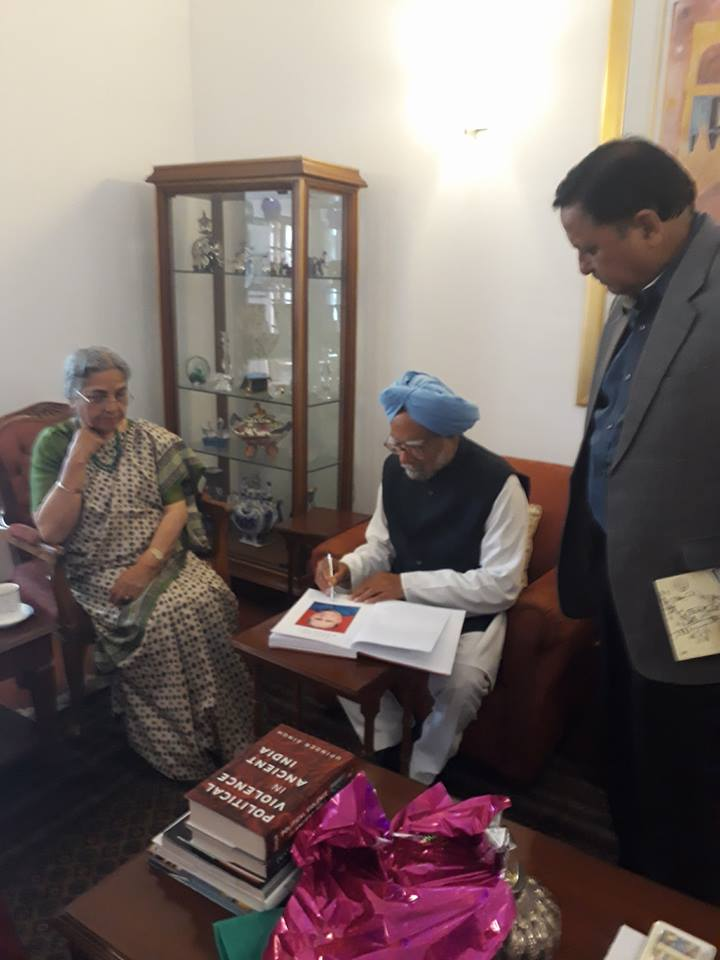

Bhuvnesh Chaturvedi (Hindi: भुवनेश चतुर्वेदी ; 2 May 1928 – 2 March 2014) was an Indian politician who was a Minister of State and Union minister in the Prime Minister's Office during Narsimha Rao's tenure. On 2 March 2014 he died in a private hospital at Kota, Rajasthan at the age of 85.

== Early life and education ==
Born in May 1928 in Mainpuri, Uttar Pradesh, he was educated at Herbers College, Kota. An advocate and journalist by profession, Shri Chaturvedi was actively involved in student and youth movements, he was President of NSUI during 1953-56.

== Career ==
He started his legislative career with the Rajasthan Legislative Assembly, where he was member from 1972 to 1977. He represented Rajasthan in the Rajya Sabha for three terms, from 1982 to 2000. He was Union Minister of State for the Prime Minister's Office from February 1993 to May 1996 and Minister for Science and Technology from December 1993 to May 1996. He was also the Director of Bank of Baroda.

He started two schools in Kota: Bal Vidyalaya (later Bhuvnesh Bal Vidyalaya) and Bal Mandir (later Bhuvanesh Bal Mandir). He also built a Science Museum at Bal Vidhyalaya, Kota, which was inaugurated by Honourable Dr. A.P.J. Abdul Kalam (former President of India). He also contributed to the development of a crematorium in Kota.

He entered into politics after contesting the Presidential elections of the Student Union of Government College, Kota. He lost the first election to Satyaprakash Sharma in 1952-53 but won the second in 1953-54. He admired Dr. Krishna Menon, who was India's Representative at the United Nations, and called him as the Chief Guest for a function. Chaturvedi later started a memorial lecture series at Bal Madhyamik Kota, where eminent personalities like Mr. P.V. Narasimha Rao expressed their views about the life and achievements of Dr. Menon. Chaturvedi was sent to Russia by Dr. Menon to accompany the student representatives representing India and the foundation was laid for his entry into politics.

He was very close to ex Prime Minister P.V. Narasimha Rao and being a State Minister in the Prime Minister's Office he supported the PM in the execution of tasks and decisions relevant to Nuclear Power, Science and Technology Department, Jammu Kashmir matters relevant to election.

In February 2017, a trust was formed in his name which is called "The Bhuvnesh Chaturvedi Trust". The trust was formed by Mrs. Mukta Chaturvedi Sharma and Dr. Prashant Sharma. The members of the trust are also from the Chaturvedi Family. The first initiative of the trust was the memorial lecture organised at Bal Mandir Kota on 2 March 2017. The topic of the memorial lecture was "Indo US Ties under the Trump Presidency" and the speakers were Dr. Amna Mirza and Dr. Chayanika Uniyal Panda. Both of them are Asst. Professors in colleges affiliated to Delhi University.

On 24 February 2018 his statue was unveiled at Bhuvanesh Bal Mandir after the instructions given by Honourable Mr. Manmohan Singh Ji through teleconference. Also a book titled as "Hadoti Kshetra Ke Kshailchitra" written by Dr.Renu Chaturvedi in the memory of Mr. Bhuvanesh Chaturvedi was released by him.

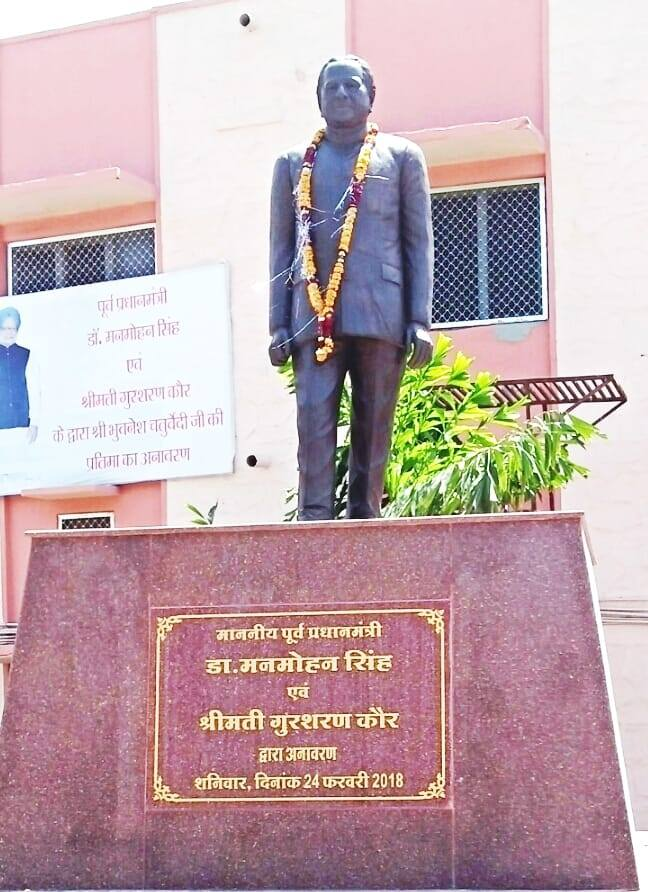
