= Sharda Bhargava =

Indian politician

Sharda Bhargava (1912–1999) was a leader of Indian National Congress and a member of Rajya Sabha from Rajasthan. She was a member of Rajya Sabha from 1952 to 1966 and also served as its vice chairperson during the 1956–57 period. She was the daughter of Mukat Behari Lal Bhargava and Vrindeshwari Bhargava. She came from the Bhargava family, a Brahmin family, and was born in Jodhpur, Rajasthan. She died in New Jersey.
