= Narayani Devi Verma =

Indian freedom fighter (?-1977)

- Died: 12 March 1977
- Known for: Bijolia movement Women's education Indian independence movement
- Spouse: Manikya Lal Verma

Narayani Devi Verma (? – 12 March 1977) was a freedom fighter from Rajasthan in the Indian independence movement. She was the wife of fellow freedom fighter Manikya Lal Verma and together they fought with colonial, imperialist as well as feudal oppression in the erstwhile princely state of Mewar. She had played a key role in the Bijolia movement and also took many steps to promote women's education. While she was very active in the Praja Mandal Movement, her commitment to Gandhian ideals resulted in her active efforts towards tribal welfare and Dalit upliftment. Even after independence, she remained active in both politics and social service. She was a Rajya Sabha member from 1970 to 1976. She died on 12 March 1977.

== Early life ==
Narayani Devi was the daughter of Ramsahay Bhatnagar of Singoli village of Madhya Pradesh. She was married to Manikya Lal Verma at the age of 12. The atrocities of the rulers and jagirdars on the peasants and the common people was found unbearable by Manikya Lal. He thus took a lifelong pledge to serve the peasants, dalits, and tribals and decided to oppose the ruling powers and state forces. Narayani Devi became his ally in this endeavour and contributed in both proactive and supporting roles. After Manikya Lal went to jail, Narayani Devi took up the responsibility of nurturing the family as well as teaching people. She also undertook many initiatives to prepare women to stand against the exploitation by the state.

== Freedom movement and social reforms ==
Verma had mobilised many women to work for the cause of nationalism and social awakening. Along with her team, she used to spread this message from house to house and inspired people to raise their voice against forced labour, drug addiction, child marriage and work unitedly.

=== Bijolia Movement and mobilisation of women ===
Verma mobilised several women leaders and participants for the Bijolia peasant movement in the Mewar region. For the first time in Rajasthan, women came out in public space and played an effective role. She was joined by Anjana Devi in her efforts to mobilise women. They used to organise separate meetings for women peasants regularly. During these meetings they would be facing the guns of state forces in a vain effort to scare them. Verma inspired peasant women by example and even worked in the fields with the peasants. The women, despite all challenges, rose to the occasion and courageously took active part in the Bijolia movement.

=== Social reforms ===
Verma also integrated her zeal for social reforms with the political movement. Both Manikya Lal and Narayani Devi were committed to work for education of children of peasants. The latter also took a stand against the use of alcohol and created awareness against ill effects in the society. She again lived by example by giving up the practice of purdah (veil), a difficult task as it was a deeply entrenched practice in the region. Thus, she encouraged women to get rid of their shackles not just politically but also socially.

=== Prajamandal Movement ===
Verma displayed leadership initiative during the Praja Mandal movement as well. In the first session, she planned to welcome the national leaders and was also able to organise a separate women's conference, even though in erstwhile Rajputana women did not usually come out in public. In 1939, during the Quit India Movement, when her husband Manikya Lal was arrested, she took over the leadership role and did not allow the movement in Mewar to weaken in his absence. In 1939 and then in 1942, she was herself arrested.

=== Popularising Khadi ===
Her efforts for political mobilization also included popularizing use of charkha and khadi. The two had become symbols of Indian nationalism under the leadership of Mahatma Gandhi. They became popular in political mobilisation of women in the Indian independence movement. She taught the peasant women howto ply charkha. She herself always wore khadi.

== Dalit upliftment and tribal welfare ==
Verma took many steps to bring Dalits and tribals bring into the mainstream. In 1934, Manikyalal Verma and Shobha Lal Gupta had set up Sevashram for Harijan welfare in Nareli, near Ajmer. She played an active role in mobilizing Dalits through involving them in constructive activities.

Narayani Devi with Manikyalal Verma established Khadlai Ashram in tribal areas of Bagad region in Banswara and Dungarpur where she lived with her children. As the tribal welfare activities widened, Bagad Seva Mandir was set up by Manikya Lal. Narayani Devi did not shy away from the difficult life in this inhospitable region in view of being in close proximity with the tribal population. Her three-year-old son succumbed to an illness due to lack of medical facilities in the region.

== Women’s education ==
During the Bijolia movement, Verma organized night school for peasant women. At the same time, she also assisted Manikyalal in a school, started by him, for children of the peasants. In 1944, she established Mahila Ashram in Bhilwara for the education of tribal women, which eventually attracted a large number of students. Due to her efforts, a girls school, Bhil Kanyashala was opened in Udaipur in 1944 where Bhil tribal girls registered a significant presence.
