= Narendra Pradhan =

Indian politician

Member of Parliament, Rajya Sabha
- In office 1992-1998
- Constituency: Odisha

Personal details
- Born: 7 April 1947 (age 79)
- Party: Janata Dal
- Spouse: Jyotsna Swain

Narendra Pradhan is an Indian politician. He was a Member of Parliament, representing Odisha in the Rajya Sabha, the upper house of India's Parliament, as a member of the Janata Dal.
