= Matang Sinh =

Indian politician (1953–2021)

Matang Sinh (August 1953 – 6 May 2021) was a leader of Indian National Congress and a former union minister of India.

== Biography ==
He was elected to Rajya Sabha from Assam in 1992 and served as union minister of state in parliamentary affairs from 1994 to 1998.

Sinh was arrested by CBI on 31 January 2015 for his alleged involvement in Saradha Chit Fund Scam. His ex-wife Manoranjana Singh was also found to be involved in the scam. He died on 6 May 2021, from COVID-19 complications.
