= Shantilal Kothari =

Indian politician

Member of Parliament, Rajya Sabha
- In office 1964-1970
- Constituency: Rajasthan

Personal details
- Born: 3 October 1924
- Died: 20 November 2000 (aged 76)
- Party: Indian National Congress
- Spouse: Vimla T. Singhi
- Children: 1 Son and 2 daughter

Shantilal Kothari also spelt as Shanti Lal was an Indian politician. He was a Member of Parliament, representing Rajasthan in the Rajya Sabha the upper house of India's Parliament as a member of the Indian National Congress.
