= Joraram Kumawat =

Indian politician (born 1964)

Cabinet Minister, Government of Rajasthan
- Incumbent
- Assumed office 30 December 2023
- Governor: Kalraj Mishra; Haribhau Bagade
- Chief Minister: Bhajan Lal Sharma
- Ministry and Departments: List: Animal Husbandry & Dairy; Cow Husbandry; Devasthan
- Preceded by: Pramod Jain Bhaya

Member of the Rajasthan Legislative Assembly
- Incumbent
- Assumed office 2018
- Preceded by: Madan Rathore
- Constituency: Sumerpur

Chairman, Sumerpur Municipality
- In office 2014–2018

Sarpanch, Gram Panchayat Sindru
- In office 2000–2005

Personal details
- Born: 7 May 1964 (age 61) Sindru, Sumerpur, Pali district, Rajasthan, India
- Party: Bharatiya Janata Party
- Spouse: Dharmi Devi
- Children: 3
- Parent(s): Puraram Kumawat (father); Oti Bai (mother)
- Education: 7th pass (1977) from Mahatma Gandhi State School, Sanderao
- Occupation: Politician
- Profession: Business

Joraram Kumawat (born 7 May 1964) is an Indian politician currently serving as a Cabinet Minister in the Government of Rajasthan, handling the Devasthan, Cow Husbandry, and Animal Husbandry & Dairy departments. He is a member of the Rajasthan Legislative Assembly, representing the Sumerpur Assembly constituency since 2018. He is affiliated with the Bharatiya Janata Party.

== Political career ==
Joraram Kumawat began his political journey at the grassroots level, serving as the Sarpanch of Gram Panchayat Sindru from 2000 to 2005. He later held the position of Chairman of Sumerpur Municipality from 2014 to 2018, focusing on urban infrastructure and local development.

In 2018, he contested the Rajasthan Legislative Assembly election from the Sumerpur constituency as a Bharatiya Janata Party (BJP) candidate and secured a decisive victory over Congress candidate Ranju Ramawat. He was re-elected in 2023, defeating Congress candidate Harishankar with a significant margin.

In December 2023, following the formation of the Bhajan Lal Sharma government, Kumawat was appointed Cabinet Minister and entrusted with the portfolios of Animal Husbandry & Dairy, Cow Husbandry, and Devasthan Department.

== Electoral record ==
Election results
Year	Office	Constituency	Party	Votes (Joraram Kumawat)	%	Opponent	Opponent Party	Votes	%	Result	Ref
2023	MLA	Sumerpur	Bharatiya Janata Party	104,044	54.05	Harishankar	Indian National Congress	76,662	39.83	Won	
2018	MLA	Sumerpur	Bharatiya Janata Party	96,617	55.57	Ranju Ramawat	Indian National Congress	63,685	36.63	Won	
