= Narain Prasad Gupta =

Indian politician

Narain Prasad Gupta was a member of Rajya Sabha of India from Madhya Pradesh. He was founding members of Jana Sangh and is a member of the Bharatiya Janata Party political party.
