= Gundappa Korwar =

Indian politician

Member of Parliament, Rajya Sabha
- In office 1992-1998
- Constituency: Karnataka

Personal details
- Born: 13 December 1939
- Died: 5 May 2003 (aged 63)
- Party: Indian National Congress
- Spouse: Kashibai Korwar

Gundappa Korwar is an Indian politician. He was a Member of Parliament, representing Karnataka in the Rajya Sabha the upper house of India's Parliament as a member of the Indian National Congress.
