= Jamuna Devi Barupal =

Indian politician (1934–2022)

Jamna Devi Barupal

Member of Parliament, Rajya Sabha
- In office 2000–2006
- Constituency: Rajasthan

Personal details
- Born: 15 August 1934 Bikaner, Rajasthan, British India
- Died: 20 January 2022 (aged 87) Bikaner, Rajasthan, India
- Party: Indian National Congress
- Spouse: Kesari Chand ji
- Children: 2
- Parent: Pannalal Barupal (Father)

Jamana Devi Barupal (15 August 1934 – 20 January 2022) was an Indian politician who was a Member of Parliament in Rajya Sabha from Rajasthan, and a leader in the Indian National Congress. Barupal died on 20 January 2022, at the age of 87.
