= Bhim Raj =

Indian politician (1943–1994)

Member of Parliament, Rajya Sabha
- In office 1978-1990
- Constituency: Rajasthan

Personal details
- Born: 28 December 1943
- Party: Indian National Congress
- Spouse: Damyanti Devi

Bhim Raj (1943-1994) was an Indian politician. He was a Member of Parliament, representing Rajasthan in the Rajya Sabha the upper house of India's Parliament as a member of the Indian National Congress.
