= Harish Chandra Mathur =

Indian politician and administrator

Harish Chandra Mathur (4 June 1904 – July 1968) was politician and administrator from Rajasthan state. He was elected to Lok Sabha from Jalore in 1962 and from Pali in 1957 . He was a minister in congress governments. HCM Rajasthan State Institute of Public Administration is named after him.
