= Swami Keshwanand =

Indian social reformer (1883–1972)

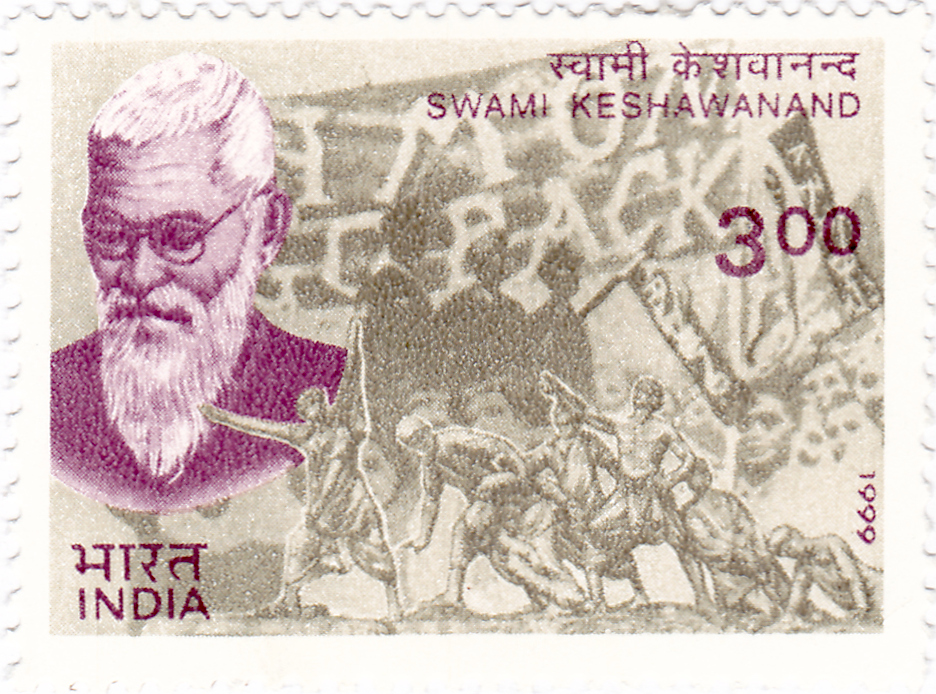
- Keshwanand on a 1999 stamp of India
- Born: March 12, 1883; Village Magloona, Sikar district, Rajasthan, India
- Died: September 13, 1972 (aged 89)
- Education: Hindu scriptures and languages
- Occupations: Freedom fighter, Social reformer
- Known for: Contributions to India's freedom movement and social reforms

Swami Keshwanand (12 March 1883 – 13 September 1972, born Birama) was an Indian freedom fighter and social reformer.

== Early life ==
Keshwanand was born in 1883 into a Hindu Jat family in the village of Magloona, which is located in the Sikar district of present-day Rajasthan. He was the son of Thakarsi, a camel-driver, and his wife Saran. When Keshwanand was five, his family left Magloona for the nearby town of Ratangarh.

His father, who escorted prosperous seths (businessmen) from Ratangarh to Delhi on his camel, died in 1890 when Keshwanand was seven. This death reduced Keshwanand's already slim chances of becoming educated. For a prolonged period, his mother needed to adopt an itinerant lifestyle in search of shelter and fodder for her animals. In 1897, they settled at the village of Kelania in present-day Sri Ganganagar. His mother died in 1899 because of a famine in Rajasthan. According to Keshwanand's own account of the 1899 famine:

There was no vegetation left on the ground. There was no drop of water. All the animals died for want of fodder. People survived on grasses and the bark of "Khejri" trees. Even that also became scarce. There was nothing like governance. The ruling Samants were least bothered for the poor people...

== Education ==
The famine forced Keshwanand to leave the desert region at the age of 16 and move to Punjab in search of a livelihood, before becoming interested in spirituality. He approached Mahant Kushaldas of the Udasin sect, to whom he expressed the desire to learn Sanskrit in order to study the higher Hindu scriptures from primary sources. Noting that Keshwanand belonged to the Jat caste, who were customarily precluded from studying the higher scriptures or even the liturgical Sanskrit language, Mahant Kushaldas advised him to become a sannyasi, or renunciate, which would render him eligible to learn Sanskrit.

Accordingly, Keshwanand became a sannyasi in 1904, was inducted into the Udasin sect, and commenced his education at the Sadhu Ashram Fazilka, a Hindu seminary located in Punjab. He learned the Hindi and Sanskrit languages, as well as the Devanagari and Gurmukhi scripts, at the ashram. At the Kumbha Mela (Hindu pilgrimage and festival) held at Prayag in 1905, Mahatma Hiranandji Avadhut conferred on Keshwanand the new name "Swami Keshwanand".

== Career ==
=== Freedom fighter ===
The Jallianwalla Bagh Massacre of 1919, which had a profound impact on the collective psyche of the Punjab region, left Keshwanand profoundly moved. He started attending meetings of the Indian National Congress, joined the Indian Independence Movement under the leadership of Mahatma Gandhi, and participated in the non-cooperation movement, for which he was imprisoned for two years (1921–1922) at Ferozepur. In 1930, he was given charge of Congress activities in the Ferozepur district. He was again arrested the same year, but he was soon released in conformity to the Gandhi-Irwin Pact.

=== Educator ===
Keshwanand founded more than 300 schools, 50 hostels, multiple libraries, social service centres, and museums. In 1911, within a few years of his initiation into the Udasin Dasnami sect as a sannyasi, Keshwanand started the Vedant Pushp Vatika library within the precincts of the Sadhu Ashram Fazilka. The following year, he started a Sanskrit school at the same location. In 1932, Keshwanand was made director of the Jat School, Sangaria, which was on the verge of closure for want of funds. He travelled among villages to collect funds, and he was successful in averting the closure of the school, which was renamed Gramothan Vidyapith, Sangaria in 1948. Within the precincts of this school, Keshwanand developed a museum with a valuable collection of rare documents, paintings, and antiques, thereby initiating conservation efforts in the area. The students of the school, aided by the local community, successfully undertook a large-scale project to green the precincts of the school, which is located in one of the most arid regions of India. Gramothan Vidyapith, Sangaria has become an inspiration for educators widely.

=== Propagation of Hindi ===
Keshwanand felt that knowledge of Hindi, his first language, was necessary to keep the country united and to educate the public about nationality. He felt that forcing people from other parts of India to learn Hindi would aid national unity. He started his programme of spreading Hindi by founding a Hindi forum, the 'Nagari Pracharini Sabha', at Abohar in the Ferozepur district of Punjab in 1920. This forum was later renamed Sahitya Sadan, Abohar. In 1933, he started a press named Deepak at Abohar, which published material in the Hindi language that was distributed either free or at a very low price. He organised the 30th All-India Hindi Sahitya Sammelan (literary conference) at Sahitya Sadan, Abohar, in 1941. Swami Keshwanand was a longtime member of the Hindi Sahitya Sammelan (literary organization), Allahabad. He wrote, or arranged to have translated into Hindi, around 100 books. Over the course of eleven years, he arranged for the publication of the Hindi edition of the book History of Sikhs in 1954. In 1942, he was honoured with the Sahitya Vachaspati award for his efforts in propagating Hindi.

=== Social reformer ===
Keshwanand published a book titled Maru Bhumi Seva Karya. The book explained the peculiarities of the Desert region, identified its perceived problems, and suggested solutions. Keshwanand's lifelong endeavour was to eradicate social phenomena such as untouchability, illiteracy, child marriage, indebtedness, poverty, backwardness, alcohol abuse, and moral dissipation.

Keshwanand organised celebrations in honour of Sikh, Bishnoi, Namdhari and Jain gurus. During the partition of India in 1947, he arranged for wounded Muslims to be admitted to hospitals, and he arranged food and shelter for them.

Keshwanand started a girls' school called "Gramothan Vidyapeath" in Sangriya in August 1917. Because of his efforts, many others in Sangriya have prioritised education.

Keshwanand was presented with a "Abhinandan Granth" (tribute volume) by the then chief minister of Rajasthan on 9 March 1958. Keshwanand was a member of the Rajya Sabha (upper house of the Indian Parliament) for two consecutive terms, 1952–1958 and 1958–1964. He died on 13 September 1972 in Delhi. The Department of Posts, Government of India, issued a commemorative postage stamp in his honour on 15 August 1999. In 2009, Swami Keshwanand Rajasthan Agricultural University and Swami Keshvanand Institute of Technology Management & Gramothan in Jaipur were named after him.
