= Chunnilal Garasiya =

Indian politician from Rajasthan

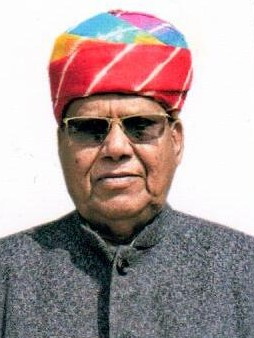

Member of Parliament, Rajya Sabha
- Incumbent
- Assumed office 3 April 2024
- Preceded by: Bhupender Yadav
- Constituency: List of Rajya Sabha members from Rajasthan

Member of Rajasthan Legislative Assembly
- In office 1990 - 1998
- Constituency: Udaipur Rural

Personal details
- Party: Bharatiya Janata Party
- Education: Intermediate
- Alma mater: Bhupal Noble's College

Chunnilal Garasiya is an Indian politician from Rajasthan who served as member of Rajasthan Legislative Assembly from Udaipur Rural seat from 1990 till 1998. A member of Bharatiya Janata Party, he is serving as member of Rajya Sabha from Rajasthan state since 2024.

== Education ==
Garasiya studied till intermediate in Bhupal Noble's College, Udaipur.

== Career ==
Garasiya went on to be elected twice from Udaipur Rural Assembly seat in 1990 and 1993. From 1990 till 1992 he served as minister of state (Independent Charge) for the Government of Rajasthan in Tribal Areas Development, Public Works Department (PWD), Health and Family Welfare offices.

He assumed the role of state vice president in BJP.

== Personal life ==
He married Sushila Garasia in 1979. He has three daughters.
