= Santosh Bagrodia =

Indian politician

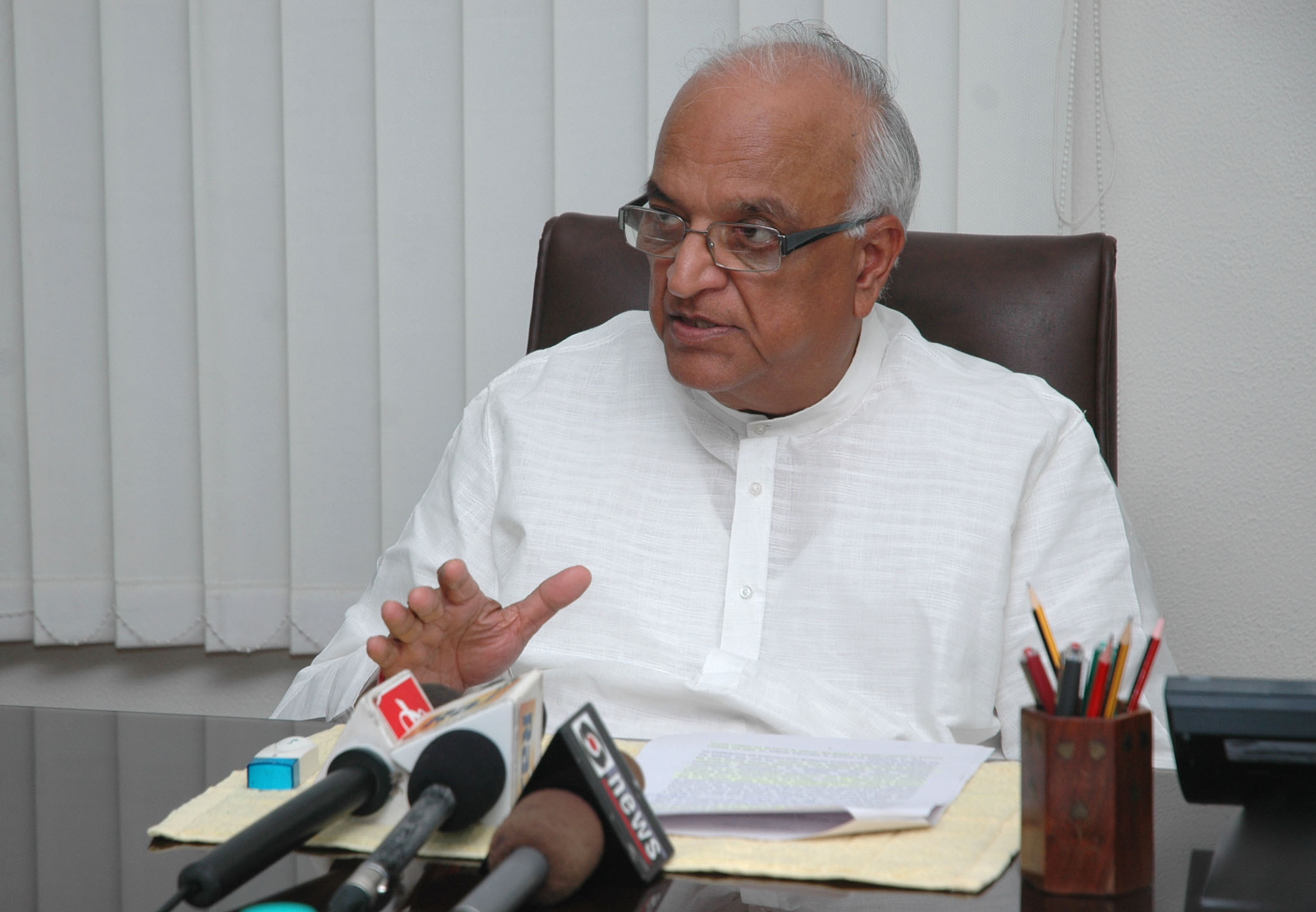
The Minister of State for Coal, Shri Santosh Bagrodia addressing the press about the review coal production targets with the CMDs of all Coal Companies, in New Delhi on August 12, 2008

Shri Santosh Bagrodia a politician from Indian National Congress was a Member of the Parliament of India. He represented Rajasthan in the Rajya Sabha, the upper house of the Indian Parliament till 2010.

On 6 April 2008, he became the Coal Minister of India.

== Career ==
He worked for 20 years as a social worker and then in 1975 he started his politics career with Indian National Congress.
