= Mool Chand Meena =

Indian politician

Member of Parliament, Rajya Sabha
- In office 1992–2006
- Constituency: Rajasthan

Personal details
- Born: 14 February 1956

Mool Chand Meena is an Indian politician who served as the Member of Parliament in the Rajya Sabha from 1992 to 2006 from Rajasthan. In 1998, he took the position of secretary of the All India Congress Committee, of which he is currently employed.
