= Akhil Bharatiya Adhivakta Parishad =

RSS-affiliated lawyers' association

Akhil Bharatiya Adhivakta Parishad (ABAP)
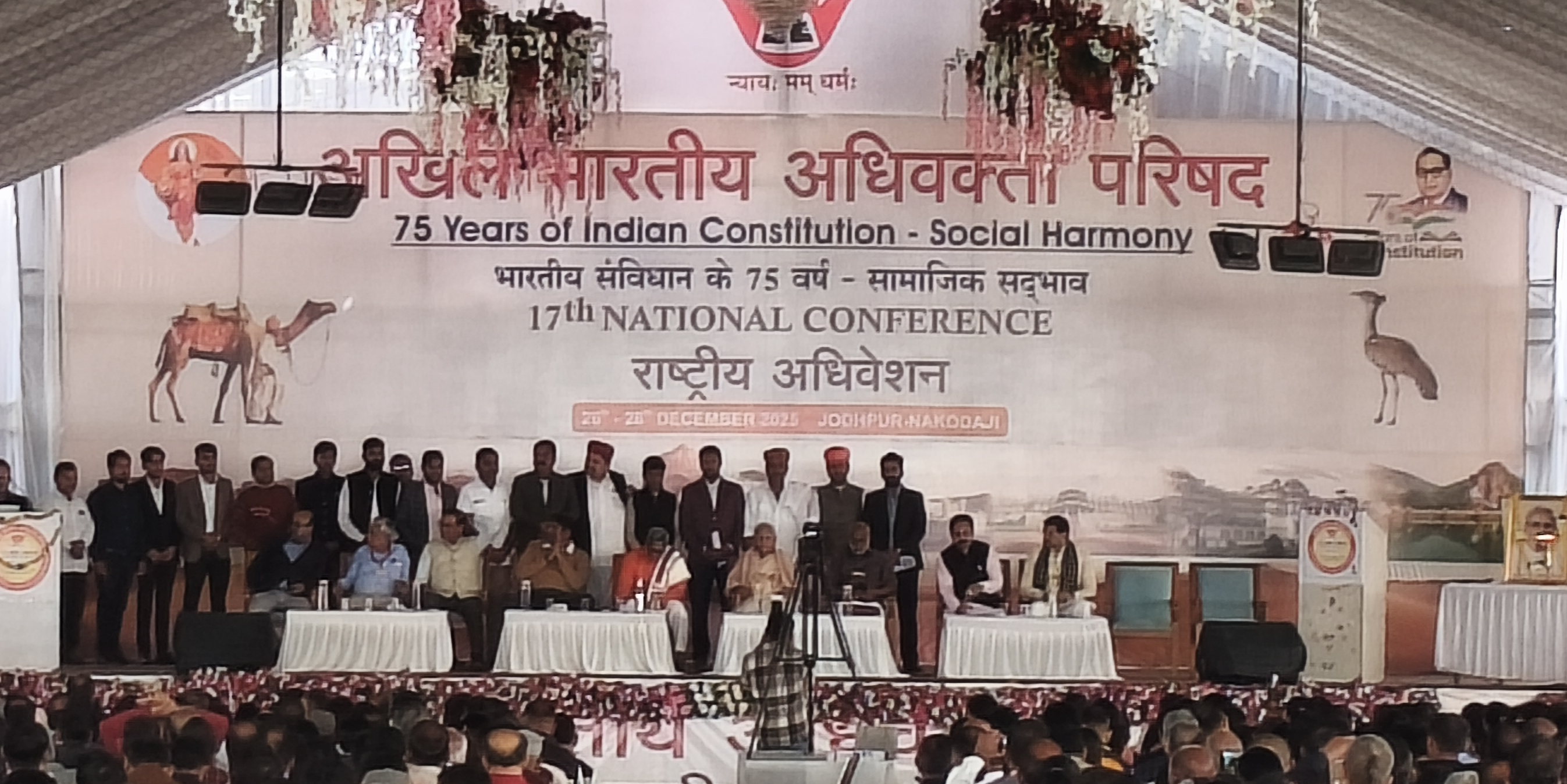
- All India Lawyers' Council
- Abbreviation: ABAP
- Formation: 7 September 1992
- Founder: Dattopant Thengadi
- Type: Umbrella organisation
- Legal status: Active
- Purpose: Legal and social activism
- Headquarters: New Delhi, India
- Region served: India
- Parent organisation: Rashtriya Swayamsevak Sangh
- Affiliations: Sangh Parivar
- Website: www.adhivaktaparishad.com

Akhil Bharatiya Adhivakta Parishad (ABAP) is a society registered under the Societies Act, 1960. The Parishad's self proclaimed objective is to resurrect Bhartiya values and ingrain idealism in the hearts of advocates for improving efficacy and standards of the Bar and the Judiciary of India.

It has been described by media outlets as affiliated with the Rashtriya Swayamsevak Sangh (RSS), a Hindu nationalist organisation. According to the organisation, ABAP advocates reforms in the Indian judicial system and promotes legal perspectives rooted in Indian cultural, civilisational, and philosophical traditions.

== Overview ==
The Akhil Bharatiya Adhivakta Parishad (ABAP) was founded on 7 September 1992. According to the organisation, the ABAP seeks to develop an "Indo-centric legal system" rooted in Indian traditions and philosophical thought. Its stated objectives include promoting social justice, safeguarding human rights and narrowing the gap between the legal system and the general public. The organisation also claims to contribute to legal and policy discourse through research, publications and the submission of legal memoranda.

The ABAP has, however, faced criticism from media outlets for its association with the RSS. It has been described as a legal front or legal wing of the Hindu nationalist organisation rather than an independent professional body by Caravan magazine. Media reports have further suggested that the organisation supports litigation initiatives and legal research aligned with the RSS's ideological objectives.

== Activities ==
The ABAP operates through its branches in all Indian states and union territories, connected via local, district, and state-level networks of lawyers. The ABAP organises legal awareness programs, professional development seminars and national conferences for advocates and law students across the country. It also advocates for the use of Indian languages in the legal system, the “Indianisation” of the judiciary, transparency in judicial appointments and reforms to make the justice system "more responsive to the needs of the down-trodden and the have-nots."

=== Nyaya Kendra ===
The Nyaya Kendras are legal aid centres established by ABAP to make justice accessible to economically and socially disadvantaged communities.

=== Legal Awareness Camps ===
ABAP conducts Legal Awareness Camps to educate citizens about their rights and responsibilities.

=== Educational Initiatives ===
ABAP organises seminars, symposiums and workshops at the national, state, district, and court levels. Court units hold periodic study circles under the guidance of senior advocates to discuss legal developments, new bills and amendments.

=== Public Interest Litigation ===
ABAP has supported public interest litigations on behalf of marginalised groups, including scheduled castes and tribes, farmers, informal workers, and women. These cases are often filed by local activists and organisations. They are then represented and guided by advocates associated with ABAP.

=== Study and Research Groups ===
ABAP also publishes a quarterly bilingual magazine, Nyaya Pravah.

=== National Conventions ===
The ABAP has organised fifteen national conferences to date. The fourteenth conference in 2015 was attended by the then-Minister of Law and Justice, Sadananda Gowda.

== Prominent members ==
- N. Santosh Hegde, former judge of the Supreme Court of India and former Lokayukta of Karnataka.
- Adarsh Kumar Goel, Justice of the Supreme Court of India (appointed in 2014) and former General Secretary of the Adhivakta Parishad.
