= Madan Lal Saini =

Indian politician (1943–2019)

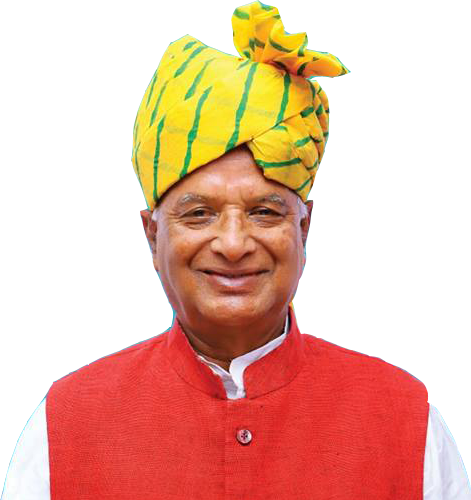
- Official Photo of State President of BJP, Rajasthan

Member of Parliament, Rajya Sabha
- In office 4 April 2018 – 24 June 2019
- Preceded by: Abhishek Manu Singhvi, INC
- Succeeded by: Manmohan Singh, INC
- Constituency: Rajasthan

Member of the Rajasthan Legislative Assembly
- In office 1990 - 1992
- Constituency: Udaipurwati

Personal details
- Born: 13 July 1943 Sikar, Rajputana Agency, British India
- Died: 24 June 2019 (aged 75) New Delhi, India
- Party: Bharatiya Janata Party

Madan Lal Saini (13 July 1943 – 24 June 2019) was an Indian politician who was the former Member of Parliament in the Rajya Sabha until his death. He hailed from the state of Rajasthan. He was a former MLA in Udaipurwati constituency from Rajasthan. He was a leader of the Bharatiya Janata Party. He was serving as President of Rajasthan State BJP until his death.
