= Ramdas Agarwal =

Indian politician(1937–2017)

President of [[Bharatiya Janata Part y, Rajasthan]]
- In office 1990–1997
- Preceded by: Bhanwar Lal Sharma
- Succeeded by: Raghuveer Singh Koshal

Member of Parliament, Rajya Sabha
- In office 4 April 2006 – 3 April 2012
- Constituency: Rajasthan
- In office 10 April 1990 – 9 April 2002
- Constituency: Rajasthan

Personal details
- Born: 17 March 1937 Jaipur, Jaipur State, British India
- Died: 26 January 2017 (aged 79) Jaipur, Rajasthan, India
- Spouse: Maanvati Agarwal (m. 1956)
- Children: 3

Ramdas Agarwal (17 March 1937 – 26 January 2017) was an Indian politician of the Bharatiya Janata Party, representing Rajasthan from 1990 to 2012 in the Rajya Sabha, the upper house of the Parliament of India.
