= Shiv Charan Singh =

Indian politician (born 1928)

Member of Parliament, Rajya Sabha
- In office 1992–1998
- Constituency: Rajasthan

Personal details
- Born: 13 May 1928
- Party: Bharatiya Janata Party

Shiv Charan Singh (born 13 May 1928) was an Indian politician. He was a Member of Parliament, representing Rajasthan in the Rajya Sabha the upper house of India's Parliament as a member of the Bharatiya Janata Party.
