= Naunihal Singh (politician) =

Indian politician (1923–2009)

Member of Parliament, Rajya Sabha
- In office 1992–1998
- Constituency: Uttar Pradesh

Personal details
- Born: 2 January 1923
- Died: 25 June 2009 (aged 86)
- Party: Bharatiya Janata Party

Naunihal Singh (2 January 1923 – 25 June 2009) was an Indian politician. He was a Member of Parliament, representing Uttar Pradesh in the Rajya Sabha the upper house of India's Parliament as a member of the Bharatiya Janata Party. Singh died on 25 June 2009, at the age of 86.
