= Satish Chandra Agarwal =

Indian politician

Personal details
- Born: 27 September 1928 Thoon, Bharatpur State, India
- Died: 10 September 1997 (aged 68) Jaipur, Rajasthan

Satish Chandra Agarwal (born Satish Gupta; 27 September 1928 – 10 September 1997) was the leader of the Bharatiya Janata Party and a member of the sixth and seventh Lok Sabha representing the Jaipur Parliamentary Constituency of Rajasthan, India from 1977 to 1984. He was previously a member of the Rajasthan Legislative Assembly from 1957 to 1972, and was later elected to the Rajya Sabha.

He was arrested and jailed during Indira Gandhi's Emergency for 19 months from 1975 to 1976. An active social and political worker, and an eminent parliamentarian, Agarwal served as Union Minister of State for Finance for the Government of India from 1977 to 1979. He was a Member of Public Accounts Committee in 1980-81 and later served as its chairman from 1981 to 1983.

Satish Agarwal was a member of the Indian Delegation to the Commonwealth Parliamentary Association Conference in Kuala Lumpur, Malaysia, in 1971 and to the Colombo Plan Conference held in Kathmandu in 1977, Washington, D.C. in1978, and London in 1979. He also participated in the Indian Delegation to Geneva in1984 and attended various other international conferences.

Agarwal died from a heart attack on 10 September 1997 in Jaipur, Rajasthan at the age of 68.
