= Lalit Kishore Chaturvedi =

Indian politician

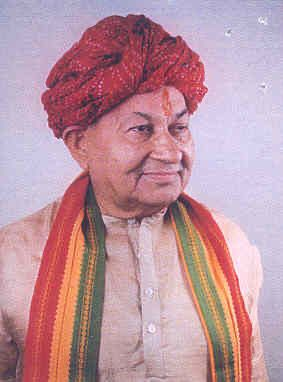
Former BJP President Rajasthan and Former Cabinet Minister Government of Rajasthan.

Lalit Kishore Chaturvedi (2 August 1931 – 5 April 2015) was an Indian politician who was one of the founding Bharatiya Janata Party (BJP) members in Rajasthan. He was a member of the Rajya Sabha. He was cabinet minister in earlier state BJP ministries with responsibilities of important portfolios. He was earlier state president of Bharatiya Janata Party, Rajasthan .. He had a Master of Science degree in physics. He was imprisoned in 1949 while participating in satyagraha to lift ban on RSS during 1948-50; organized movement against emergency and remained in jail for eighteen months, 1974-76. He was the only cabinet minister to have resigned for Ram Mandir movement in 1991.

== Early life ==
He was born on 2 August 1931 in Kota (Rajasthan), he had done MSc in Physics and was working as lecturer in various government colleges (from 1954-1966). He was married to Urmila Chaturvedi.

== Electoral history ==
1. Janata Party MLA, Kota (Rajasthan) (1977-1980)
2. Bharatiya Janata Party MLA, Kota (Rajasthan) (1980-1985)
3. Bharatiya Janata Party MLA, Kota (Rajasthan) (1985-1990)
4. Bharatiya Janata Party MLA, Kota (Rajasthan) (1990-1992)
5. Bharatiya Janata Party MLA, Kota (Rajasthan) (1993-1998)
6. Member of Parliament Rajya Sabha (Rajasthan) (2004-2010)

== Offices held ==
1. Cabinet Minister, Govt of Rajasthan (1977-1978)
2. Cabinet Minister, Govt of Rajasthan (1990-1992)
3. Cabinet Minister, Govt of Rajasthan (1993-1998)
4. State Organising Secretary, Bharatiya Jana Sangh, Rajasthan, 1966–71
5. State General Secretary (i) Janata Party, 1977-80 (ii) Bharatiya Janata Party, 1980–85 and 1998-2003
6. State President Bhartiya Janta Party Rajasthan (1987-1989 & 2004-2006)
