= Brijraj Singh =

Indian politician (1934–2022)

HH Maharao Brijraj Singh of Kotah
- Maharao of Kotah
- Predecessor: Bhim Singh II
- Spouse: Uttara Devi
- Issue: Ijyaraj Singh and Bhawani Kumari
- House: Hada Chauhans of Kotah
- Father: Bhim Singh II
- Religion: Hindu

Brijraj Singh

Member of Parliament Lok Sabha
- In office 1962 – 1977
- Preceded by: Nemi Chandra Kasliwal
- Succeeded by: Chaturbhuj
- Constituency: Jhalawar

Personal details
- Born: 21 February 1934 Umed Bhawan Palace, Kotah, British Raj
- Died: 29 January 2022 (aged 87) Kotah, Rajasthan, India
- Spouse: Maharani Uttara Devi
- Children: Ijyaraj Singh and Bhawani Kumari

Brijraj Singh (21 February 1934 – 29 January 2022) was an Indian politician and the son of the last titular ruler of Kotah. He also served as a Member of Parliament from Jhalawar for three terms.

== Biography ==
Singh was the only son of Sir Bhim Singh II, the last ruling Maharao of Kotah.

He married Maharani Maheshwari Devi Baisa, daughter of Maharawat Sir Ram Singh II Bahadur of Pratapgarh, on 5 December 1956; they divorced on 11 September 1963 in Bombay.

His second marriage was on 21 May 1963, to Maharani Uttara Devi Sahiba, daughter of Maharaj Kumar Indrajitendra Narayan of Cooch Behar.

Singh served in various posts since 1958 including Chairman Board of Directors, Central Co-Operative Bank, Kotah, (1959–1961), MP (Lok Sabha) for Jhalawar 1962–1967, 1967–1970, and 1971–1977.

Singh was elected on the Indian National Congress ticket in 1962, and on the Bharatiya Jana Sangh ticket in 1967 and 1972.

He died from a heart attack in Kotah on 29 January 2022, at the age of 85.

Singh succeeded his father as the titular Maharao of Kotah in 1991, and was succeeded by his son Ijyaraj Singh upon his own death in 2022.
