= Kota Lok Sabha constituency =

Lok Sabha Constituency in Rajasthan

Coordinates: 25.2°N 75.9°E

Kota
- Lok Sabha constituency
- Interactive Map Outlining Kota Lok Sabha Constituency

Constituency details
- Country: India
- Region: North India
- State: Rajasthan
- Assembly constituencies: Keshoraipatan; Bundi; Pipalda; Sangod; Kota North; Kota South; Ladpura; Ramganj Mandi
- Established: 1952
- Reservation: None

Member of Parliament
- 18th Lok Sabha
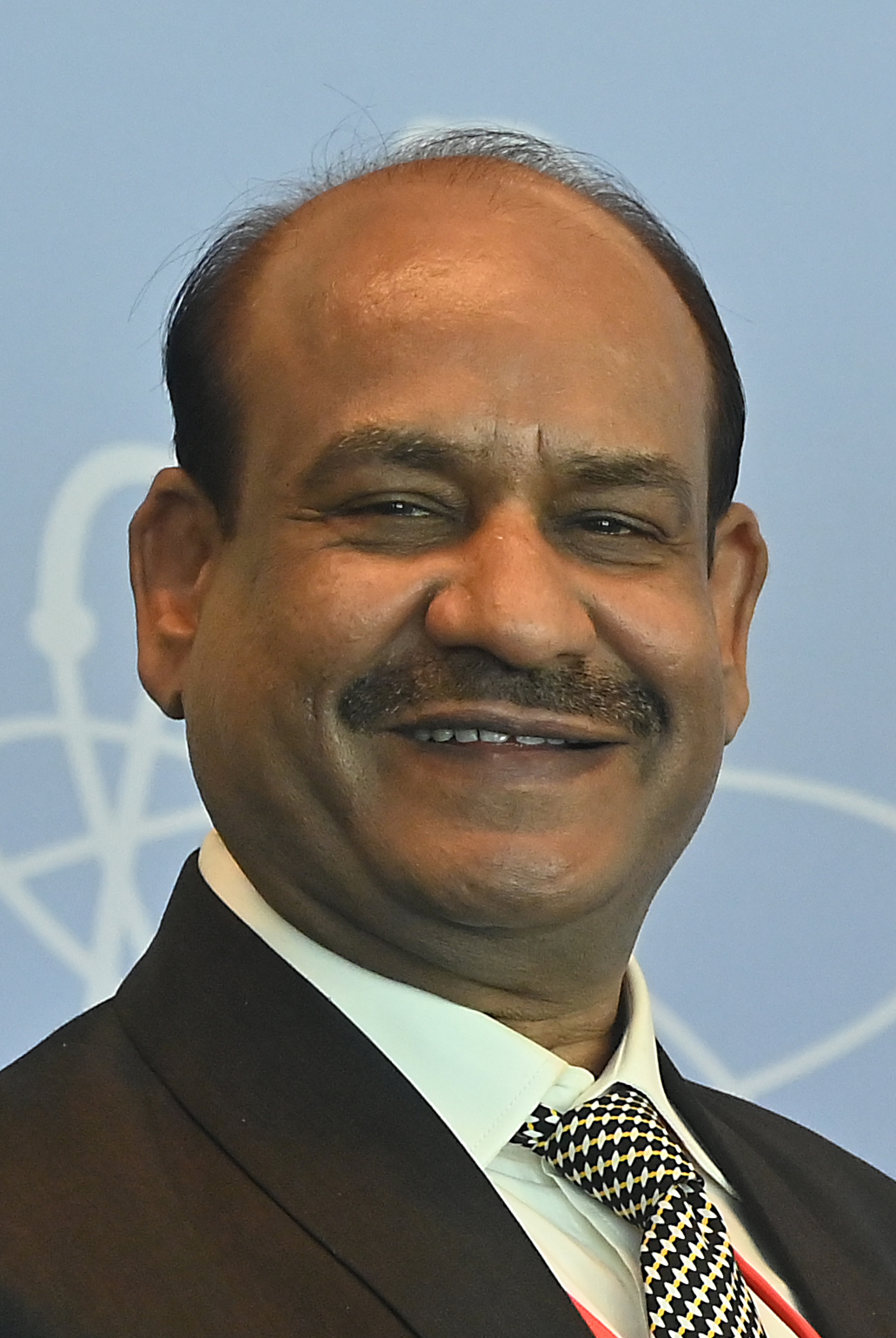
- Incumbent Om Birla; Speaker of the Lok Sabha
- Party: BJP
- Alliance: NDA
- Elected year: 2024
- Preceded by: Ijyaraj Singh; INC

Kota Lok Sabha constituency (Hindi pronunciation: [koːʈaː]) is one of the 25 Lok Sabha (parliamentary) constituencies in Rajasthan state in India.

== Assembly segments ==
Presently, Kota Lok Sabha constituency comprises eight Legislative Assembly segments. There are:

#	Name	District	Member	Party	2024 Lead
185	Keshoraipatan (SC)	Bundi	C. L. Premi Bairwa	INC	INC
186	Bundi	Bundi	Harimohan Sharma	INC	BJP
187	Pipalda	Kota	Chetan Patel Kolana	INC	INC
188	Sangod	Kota	Heeralal Nagar	BJP	BJP
189	Kota North	Kota	Shanti Dhariwal	INC	INC
190	Kota South	Kota	Sandeep Sharma	BJP	BJP
191	Ladpura	Kota	Kalpana Devi	BJP	BJP
192	Ramganj Mandi (SC)	Kota	Madan Dilawar	BJP	BJP

== Members of Parliament ==
Year	Member	Party
1952	Nemi Chandra Kasliwal	Indian National Congress
1957	Nemi Chandra Kasliwal	Indian National Congress
1957	Onkarlal Berwa	Indian National Congress
1962	Onkarlal Berwa	Bharatiya Jana Sangh
1967	Onkarlal Berwa	Bharatiya Jana Sangh
1971	Onkarlal Berwa	Bharatiya Jana Sangh
1977	Krishana Kumar Goyal	Janata Party
1980	Krishana Kumar Goyal	Janata Party
1984	Shanti Dhariwal	Indian National Congress
1989	Dau Dayal Joshi	Bharatiya Janata Party
1991	Dau Dayal Joshi	Bharatiya Janata Party
1996	Dau Dayal Joshi	Bharatiya Janata Party
1998	Ramnarayan Meena	Indian National Congress
1999	Raghuveer Singh Koshal	Bharatiya Janata Party
2004	Raghuveer Singh Koshal	Bharatiya Janata Party
2009	Ijyaraj Singh	Indian National Congress
2014	Om Birla	Bharatiya Janata Party
2019	Om Birla	Bharatiya Janata Party
2024	Om Birla	Bharatiya Janata Party

== Election results ==
=== 2024 ===
2024 Indian general election: Kota
Party	Candidate	Votes	%	±%
BJP	Om Birla	750,496	50.03	▼8.49
INC	Prahlad Gunjal	708,522	47.23	▲9.16
NOTA	None of the Above	10,262	0.68	▼0.24
RRP	Tarun Gochar	1,000	0.07	New entry
Majority		41,974	2.80	▼17.65
Turnout		15,00,959	71.86	▲1.64
BJP hold		Swing	▼8.49	

=== 2019 ===
2019 Indian general elections: Kota
Party	Candidate	Votes	%	±%
BJP	Om Birla	800,051	58.52	▲2.69
INC	Ramnarayan Meena	5,20,374	38.07	▼0.38
BSP	Harish Kumar Lahri	9,985	0.73	N/A
NOTA	None of the Above	12,589	0.92	▼0.18
Majority		2,79,677	20.45	▲3.07
Turnout		13,67,928	70.22	▲3.96
BJP hold		Swing		

=== 2014 ===
2014 Indian general elections: Kota
Party	Candidate	Votes	%	±%
BJP	Om Birla	644,822	55.83	▲15.20
INC	Ijyaraj Singh	4,44,040	38.45	▼14.35
AAP	Ashok Kumar Jain	16,981	1.47	New
NOTA	None of the Above	12,760	1.10	N/A
Majority		2,00,782	17.38	▲5.19
Turnout		11,55,972	66.26	▲20.73
BJP gain from INC		Swing	{{{swing}}}	

=== 2009 ===
2009 Indian general elections: Kota
Party	Candidate	Votes	%	±%
INC	Ijyaraj Singh	360,486	52.80	
BJP	Shyam Sharma	2,77,393	40.63	
IND.	Dr. K. Shringi	14,323	2.10	
BSP	Govind Singh Parmar	10,400	1.52	
Majority		83,093	12.19	
Turnout		6,82,412	45.53	
INC gain from BJP		Swing		

== See also ==
- Kota district
- List of constituencies of the Lok Sabha
