= Raj Chandra Sen =

Indian politician

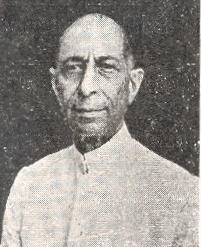
Raj Chandra Sen in 1952

Raj Chandra Sen was an Indian politician, a government Minister in the Kota State before the independence of India. He represented the Akhil Bharatiya Ram Rajya Parishad in the 1st Lok Sabha (lower house of the parliament of India) elected in 1952.

== Early life ==
Sen was born on 19 June 1890 in the estate of Delwara under Mewar, in modern day district of Rajsamand, Rajasthan as the elder son of Rao Bahadur Raj Bijay Singhji of Kunadi. Sen hailed from a Rajput family, belonging to the Jhala clan of Rajputs and its Jaitawat sub-clan. His father had been brought to Kunadi by adoption in 1888, after the death of Raj Rup Singhjj chief of Kunadi estate in the former princely state of Kota. Sen studied at Mayo College in Ajmer and obtained a Bachelor of Arts degree.

== Career ==
Between 1910 and 1912 he worked as attache to the Agent to the Governor General in Central India. In 1914 he joined the Revuene Department of the Kota State Service. On 9 November 1926 he was named Private Secretary to the Maharaja of Kota, and he was seated to the immediate left of the Maharaja in the durbar (court). In 1940 he was named Minister in of the Kota State Council. He served as Minister until 1947.

Sen also owned lands. In 1936 he succeeded his father as the holder of the Kunari estate (which traced its history to 1644, when the second ruler of Kota bestowed it upon Arjun Singh). His estate consisted of Kunari (on the left bank of Chambal river, opposite Kota town) and eight dependent villages.

In 1952, Sen was elected to the first Lok Sabha from the Kota-Bundi constituency. He obtained 41,715 votes (44.85%). Sen was one of three Akhil Bharatiya Ram Rajya Parishad members in the first Lok Sabha, all elected from constituencies in Rajasthan.
