= Ijyaraj Singh =

Indian politician

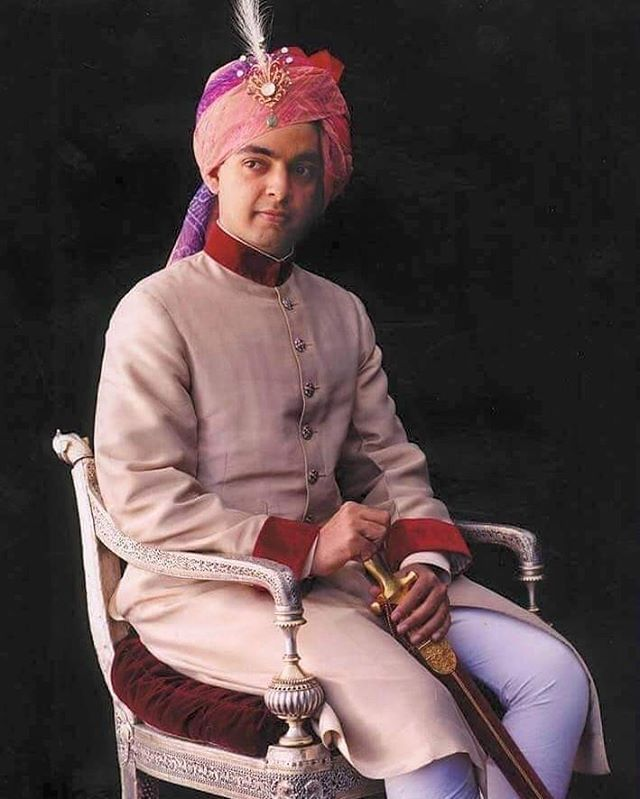

Member of Parliament
- In office 2009 to 2014
- Preceded by: Raghuveer Singh Koshal
- Succeeded by: Om Birla
- Constituency: Kota

Personal details
- Born: 9 February 1965 (age 61)
- Party: Bharatiya Janata Party (2018–present); Indian National Congress (2009–2018)
- Spouse: Kalpana Devi
- Children: Jaidev Singh
- Parent: Brijraj Singh (father)
- Education: Mayo College, Brown University, Columbia University
- Occupation: Politician

Ijyaraj Singh (born 9 February 1965) is an Indian politician and a titular monarch. He was the member of parliament representing the Kota constituency in the Lok Sabha. He is a member of the Kota royal Rajput family who were the rulers of the erstwhile state of Kotah during the British Raj. Singh contested and won his seat in the 2009 Lok Sabha elections, on the ticket of the Indian National Congress, defeating Shyam Sharma of the Bharatiya Janata Party. In 2018, he joined the BJP and his wife Maharani Kalpana Devi (politician) contested and won her seat of Ladpura (Kota) in the Legislative Assembly of Rajasthan.

On 29 January 2022, he succeeded his father as the titular Maharao of Kotah.
