= Onkarlal Berwa =

Indian politician

Member of Parliament, Lok Sabha
- In office 1957–1977
- Succeeded by: Krishana Kumar Goyal
- Constituency: Kota

Personal details
- Born: January 1916 Kota, Kota State, Rajputana Agency, British India (present-day Rajasthan, India)
- Died: 10 April 1996 (aged 80) Kota, Rajasthan, India
- Party: Bharatiya Jana Sangh
- Spouse: Kanti Devi
- Children: 10

Onkarlal Berwa (1916–1996) was an Indian politician. He was elected to the Lok Sabha, the lower house of the Parliament of India from Kota, Rajasthan as a member of the Bharatiya Jana Sangh. Bairwa died in 1996.
