= Umed Bhawan Palace =

Historic building in Kota, India

Coordinates: 25°12′36″N 75°51′53″E

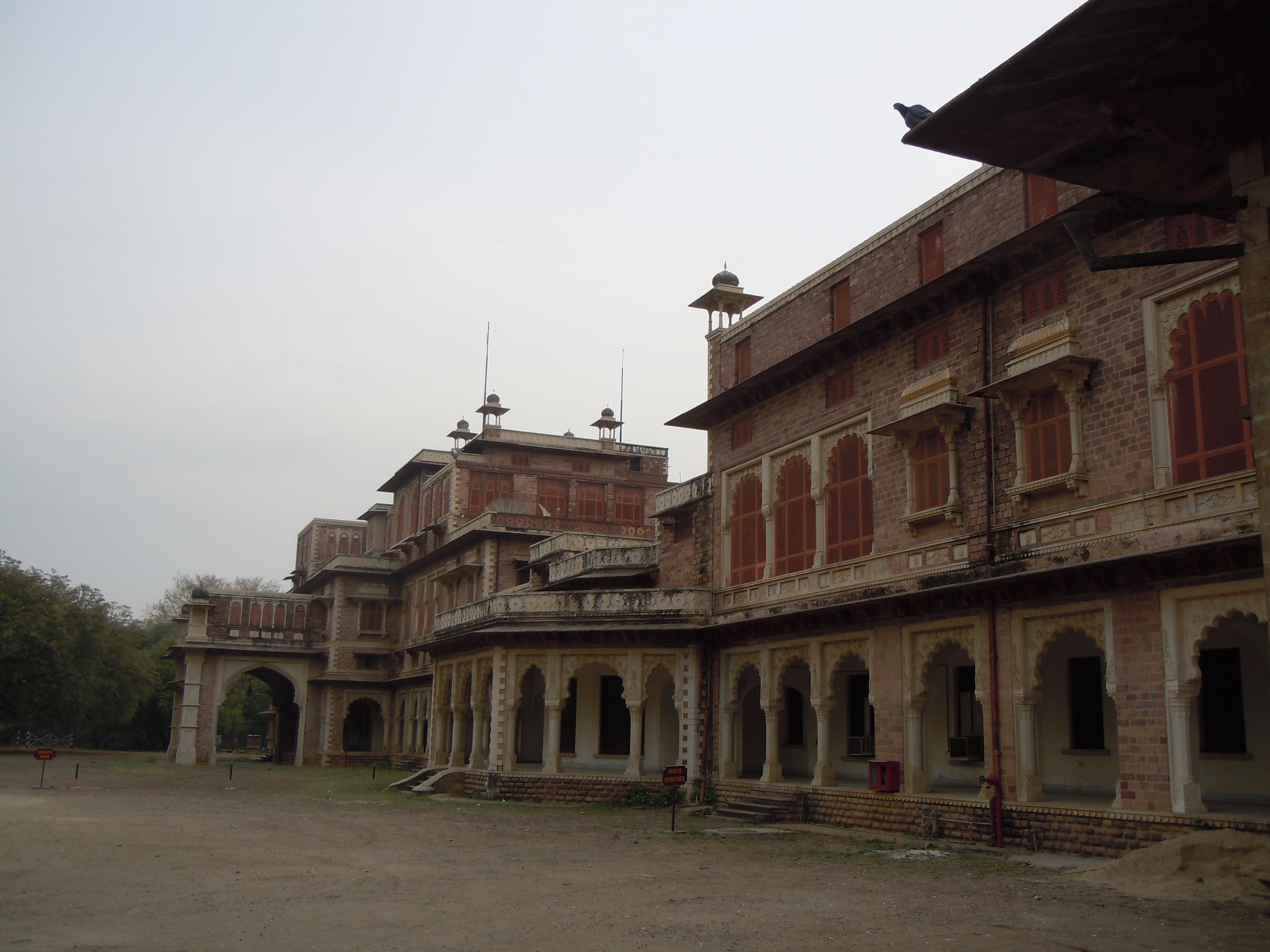
The front of the Umed Bhawan Palace

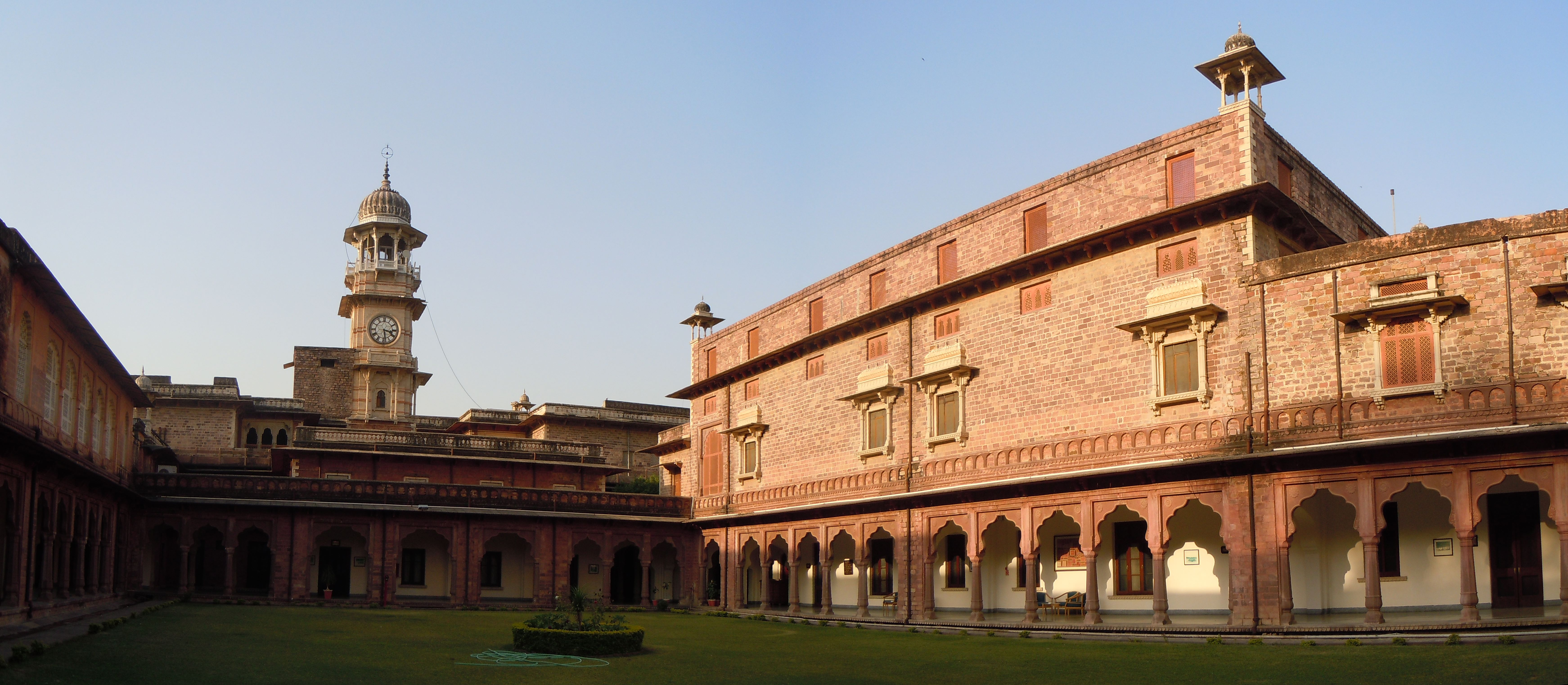
The large courtyard of the Umed Bhawan Palace

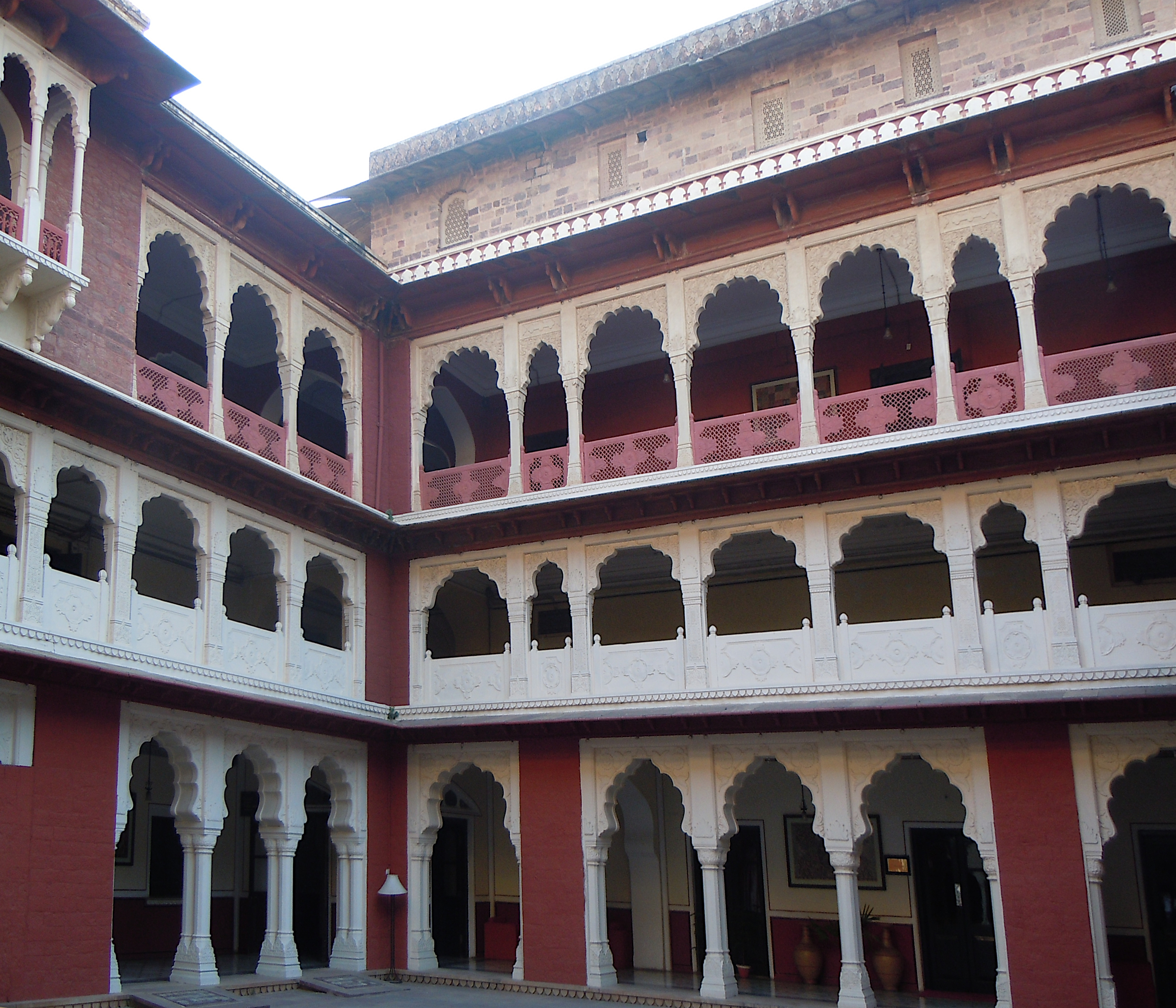
A smaller courtyard in the Umed Bhawan Palace

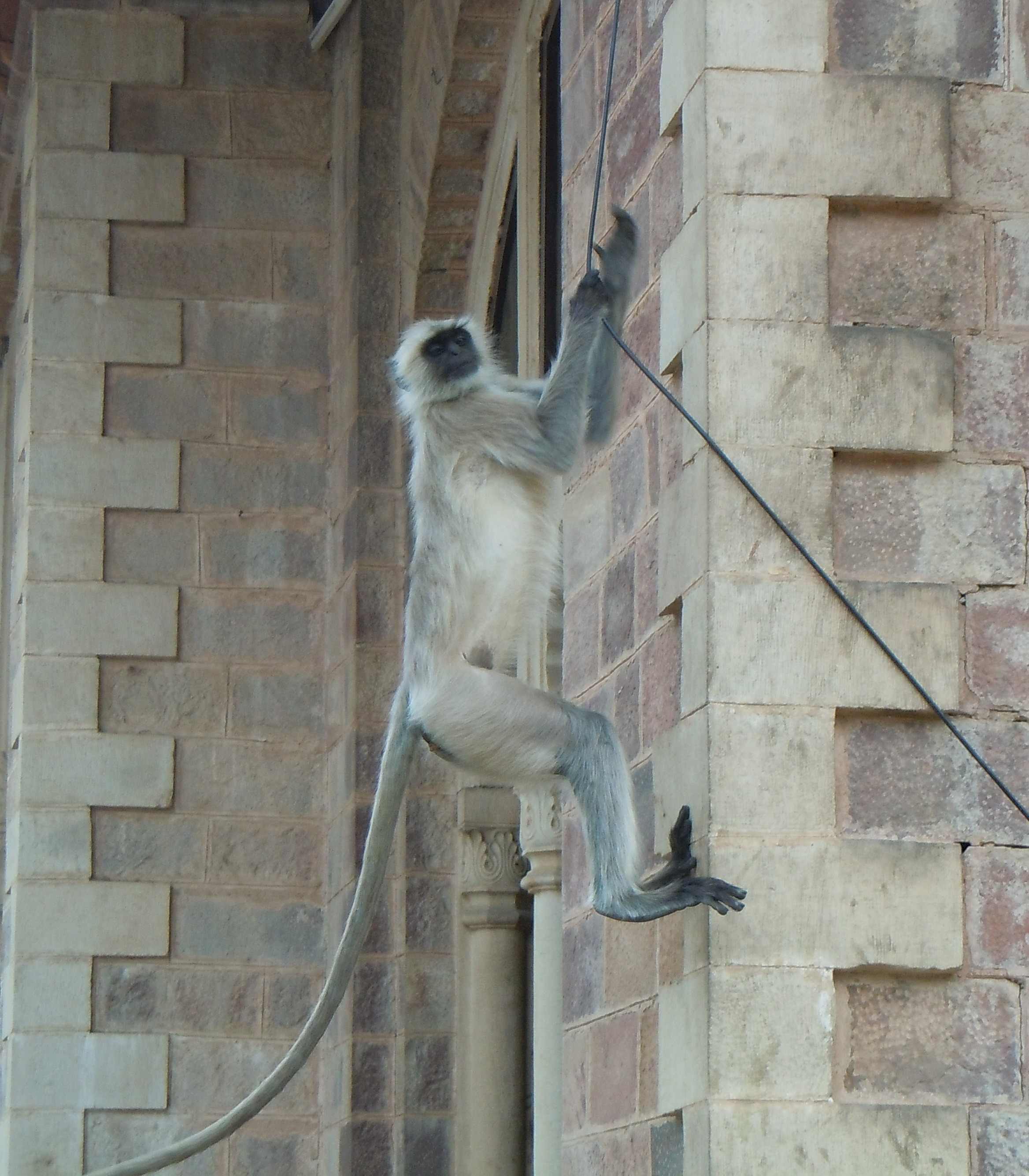
Langurs are frequent visitors to the palace

The Umed Bhawan Palace in the outskirts of Kota, Rajasthan is a former residence of the Maharaja of Kota. Nowadays, the palace is partly converted into a heritage hotel. The palace is surrounded by a large park.

== History ==
At the start of the twentieth century, Maharao Umed Singh II (1889-1940) commissioned the construction of a new palace as alternative for the fortified Kota city palace in Kota, which dated from the 17th century. He engaged as architect the British engineer Samuel Swinton Jacob who was based in Jaipur. In 1905, the maharaja moved to his new palace. The complex was named after its commissioner.

Samuel Swinton Jacob designed the palace in an Indo-Saracenic style. Although, the palace is European in conception, its exterior is decorated with Rajput and Mughal details such as verandas and porches, arches, minarets and towers topped with chhatris. The exterior primarily consists of pink sandstone intertwined with white Khimach stones and Italian marble. The complex is arranged around various courtyards. The larger one leading to the main state rooms of the palace.

In 1930, the architect George Devon was engaged to expand the palace to provide accommodation for the future maharadja Bhim Singh II (1909 – 1991) and his bride. The architect took great care to blend the new parts with the old parts designed by Samuel Jacob. This part of the palace is still used by the royal family of Kota.

After the independence of India, the palace has been sold. Part of the palace is now operated as a hotel.

== Literature ==
- Martinelli, Antonio; Michell, George (2004). Palaces of Rajasthan. London: Frances Lincoln. p. 269. ISBN 0-7112-2505-2.
