= Jhalawar Lok Sabha constituency =

Former Lok Sabha constituency

Coordinates: 24.6°N 76.2°E

Jhalawar
- Former Lok Sabha constituency

Constituency details
- Country: India
- Region: North India
- State: Rajasthan
- Established: 1952
- Abolished: 2008

Jhalawar (Hindi pronunciation: [d͡ʒʱaːlaːʋaːɽ]) was a Lok Sabha constituency in Rajasthan state in western India till 2008. In 2008 re-organization, it morphed into Jhalawar-Baran (Lok Sabha constituency).

== Assembly segments ==
Jhalawar Lok Sabha constituency comprised the following eight Vidhan Sabha (legislative assembly) segments:

1. Kishanganj
2. Atru
3. Chhabra
4. Khanpur
5. Manohar Thana
6. Jhalrapatan
7. Pirawa
8. Dag

== Members of Parliament ==
Lok Sabha	Duration	Member	Party	
First	1952-57	Nemi Chandra Kasliwal		Indian National Congress
Second	1957-62	Nemi Chandra Kasliwal		Indian National Congress
Third	1962-67	Brijraj Singh		Indian National Congress
Fourth	1967-71	Brijraj Singh		Bharatiya Jana Sangh
Fifth	1971-77	Brijraj Singh		Bharatiya Jana Sangh
Sixth	1977-80	Chaturbhuj		Janata Party
Seventh	1980-84	Chaturbhuj		Janata Party
Eighth	1984-89	Jujhar Singh		Indian National Congress
Ninth	1989-91	Vasundhara Raje		Bharatiya Janata Party
Tenth	1991-96	Vasundhara Raje		Bharatiya Janata Party
Eleventh	1996-98	Vasundhara Raje		Bharatiya Janata Party
Twelfth	1998-99	Vasundhara Raje		Bharatiya Janata Party
Thirteenth	1999-04	Vasundhara Raje		Bharatiya Janata Party
Fourteenth	2004-2009	Dushyant Singh		Bharatiya Janata Party
2008: Constituency Abolished Succeeded by -Jhalawar–Baran Lok Sabha constituency

== Election results ==
=== 2004 ===
2004 Indian general election: Jhalawar
Party	Candidate	Votes	%	±%
BJP	Dushyant Singh	303,845	53.53	−6.90
INC	Sanjay Gurjar	2,22,266	39.16	+1.22
Independent	Jakir Husen	25,164	4.43	
BSP	Ratan Lal	16,336	2.88	
Majority		81,579	14.37	−8.12
Turnout		5,67,611	47.81	−16.53
BJP hold		Swing	-6.90	

=== 1999 ===
General Election, 1999: Jhalawar
Party	Candidate	Votes	%	±%
BJP	Vasundhara Raje	409,574	60.43	
INC	Dr. Abrar Ahmed	257,159	37.94	
Independent	Jakir Husen	3,720	0.55	
Independent	Shri Puri Lal	3,311	0.49	
Majority		152,415	22.49	
Turnout		688,049	64.34	
BJP hold		Swing	+6.92	

=== 1998 ===
1998 Indian general election: Jhalawar
Party	Candidate	Votes	%	±%
BJP	Vasundhara Raje	333,746	52.77	
INC	Bharat Singh	2,70,179	42.72	
JD	Chandra Prakash Meena	8,843	1.40	
BSP	Mohan Lal	6,408	1.01	
SS	Bheru Singh	6,147	0.97	
Independent	Ramesh Chand	3,647	0.58	
Independent	Bhawani Singh	3,486	0.55	
Majority		63,567	10.05	
Turnout		6,32,456	62.31	
BJP hold		Swing		

=== 1996 ===
1996 Indian general election: Jhalawar
Party	Candidate	Votes	%	±%
BJP	Vasundhara Raje	234,360	49.89	
INC	Mansingh	1,85,476	39.48	
AIIC(T)	Nafis Ahamed Khan	5684	1.21	
SS	Ghanshyam Acharya	5364	1.14	
Majority		48,884	10.41	
Turnout		4,69,788	45.59	
BJP hold		Swing		

=== 1991 ===
1991 Indian general election: Jhalawar
Party	Candidate	Votes	%	±%
BJP	Vasundhara Raje	245,956	58.72	
INC	Man Singh	1,54,796	36.96	
JD	Het Ram Gurjar	6,302	1.50	
Desh Dal	Satya Narayan Rao	1,113	0.27	
Majority		91,160	21.76	
Turnout		4,18,845	47.19	
BJP hold		Swing		

=== 1989 ===
1989 Indian general election: Jhalawar
Party	Candidate	Votes	%	±%
BJP	Vasundhara Raje	304,728	60.96	
INC	Shiv Narain	1,58,187	31.64	
Desh Dal	Satya Narain (s/o Madan Lal)	11,078	2.22	
Majority		1,46,541	29.32	
Turnout		4,99,900	57.74	
BJP gain from INC		Swing		
