= Garh Palace, Kota =

Fortified palace in Rajasthan, India

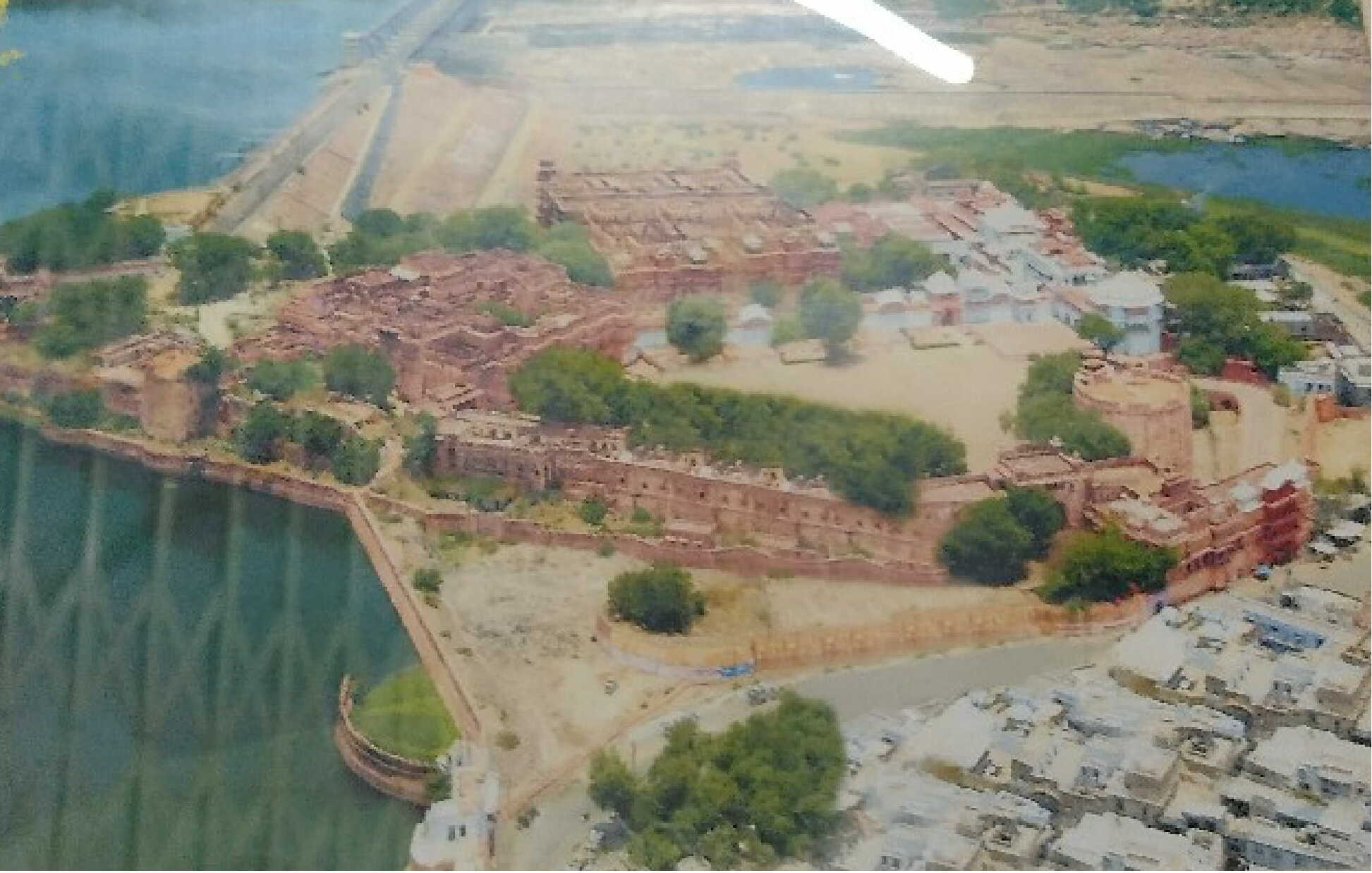
Aerial view Garh Palace, Kota

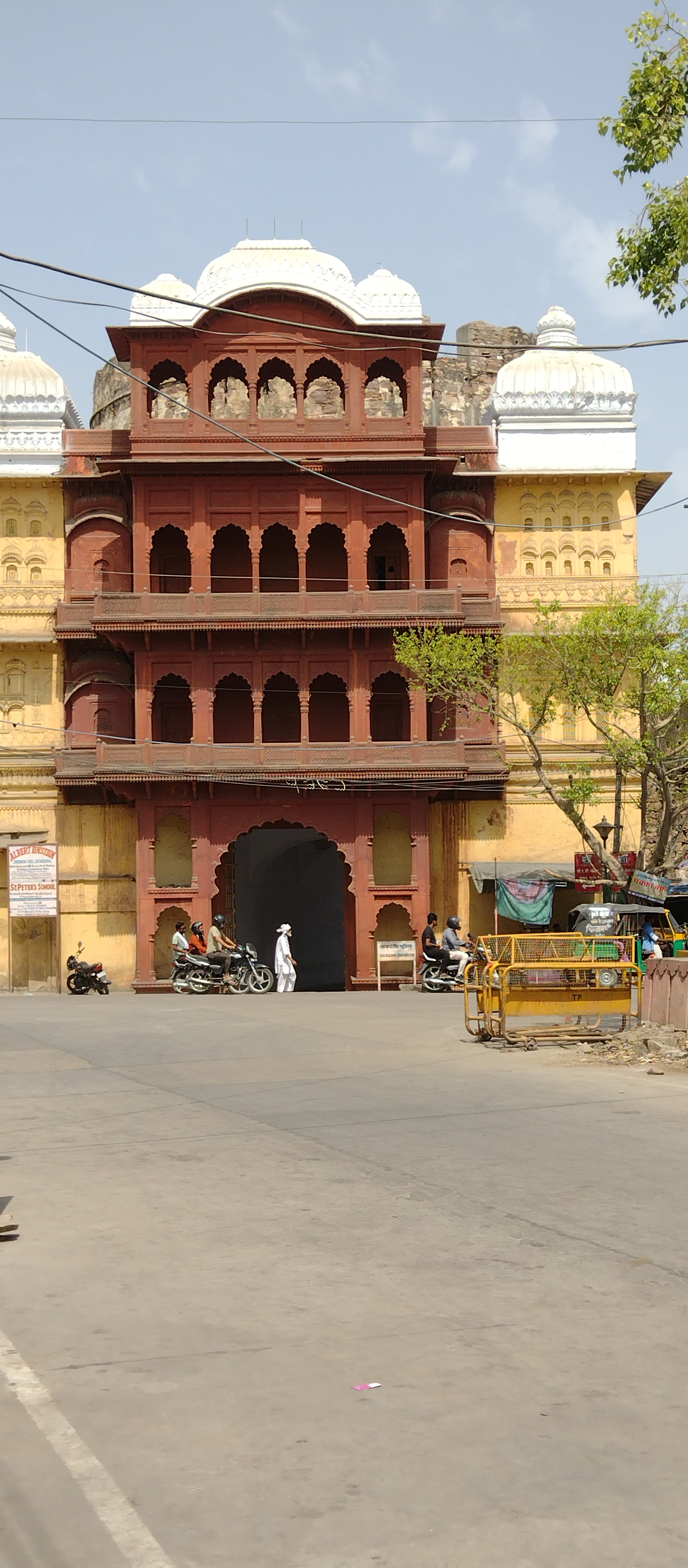
Main gate, Garh Palace, Kota

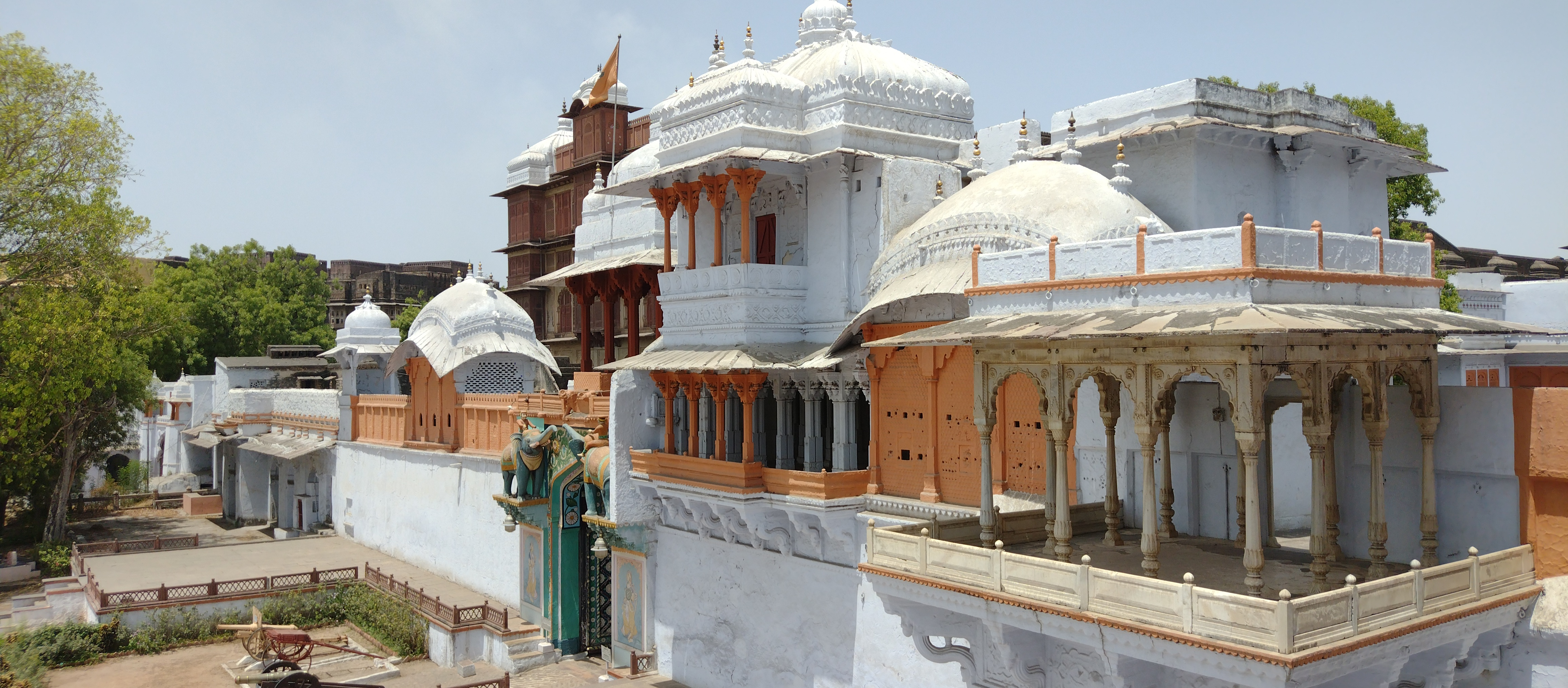
View of the palace with hathi pole

The City Palace or Garh, known locally as the "Garh Palace" is a fortified palace located in the heart of Kota, Rajasthan. It was the former residence of the Raos and Maharaos of the Kingdom of Kota. The Garh is home to a vast heritage collection of canons, paintings, armour, palaces, instruments, attire, manuscripts, murals, and buildings, some of which date back to the 13th century. The Rao Madho Singh Museum occupies the ground floor of the palace building.

== History ==
According to tradition, the foundations of the palace were first laid in 1264 C.E. by Prince Jait Singh of Bundi State on the spot where he sacrificed the chief of the Bhil tribe Chieftain Koteya (previous ruler of the region) and buried his severed head.

== Architecture ==
The fort has main entrance through a huge gate (photo placed), which connect it to the main road of Kota city.

The next gateway is called ‘Hathian Pol’ with 2 elephant structures on both sides of the gate on the upper-part as shown below. Two brass canons, Shankar Ban and Gajpat Ban are located in front of the gate giving it a royal look.

On the upper floors of the fort, there is a reception place called ‘Baradari,’ where one can have an Aerial view of the fort. Rao Madho Singh had constructed it.

Gokaneshwar Mahadev Temple and Badal Mahal are also located within the fort premises.

The palace also houses Gulab Mahal, Purana Mahal, Arjun Mahal, Hava Mahal, Diwan-e-Aam, Akhada Mahal, and Kanvarpadi-ka-Mahal. The wall paintings depicting floral and faunal diversity, hunting scenes, processions and scenes from the legend of Lord Krishna, are a common feature of these royal apartments.

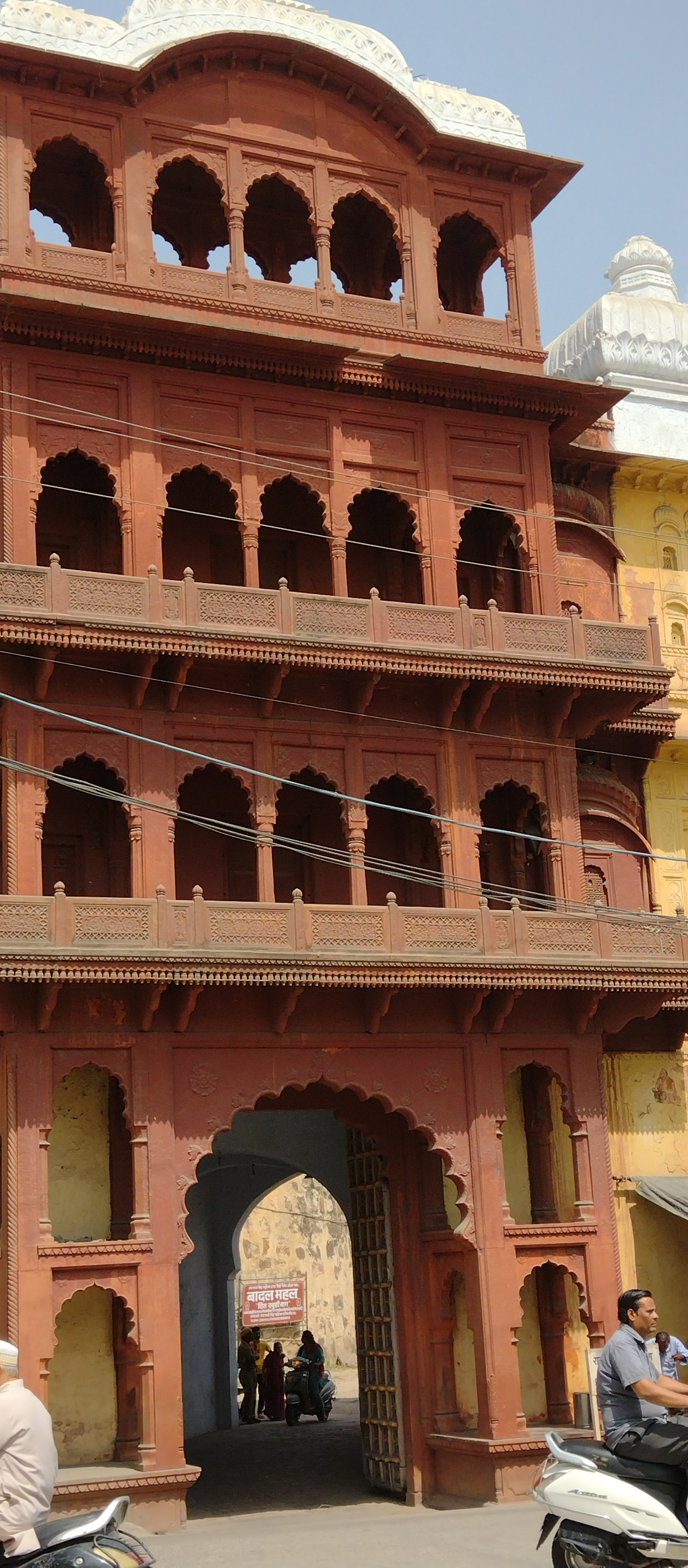
Main gate, Garh palace

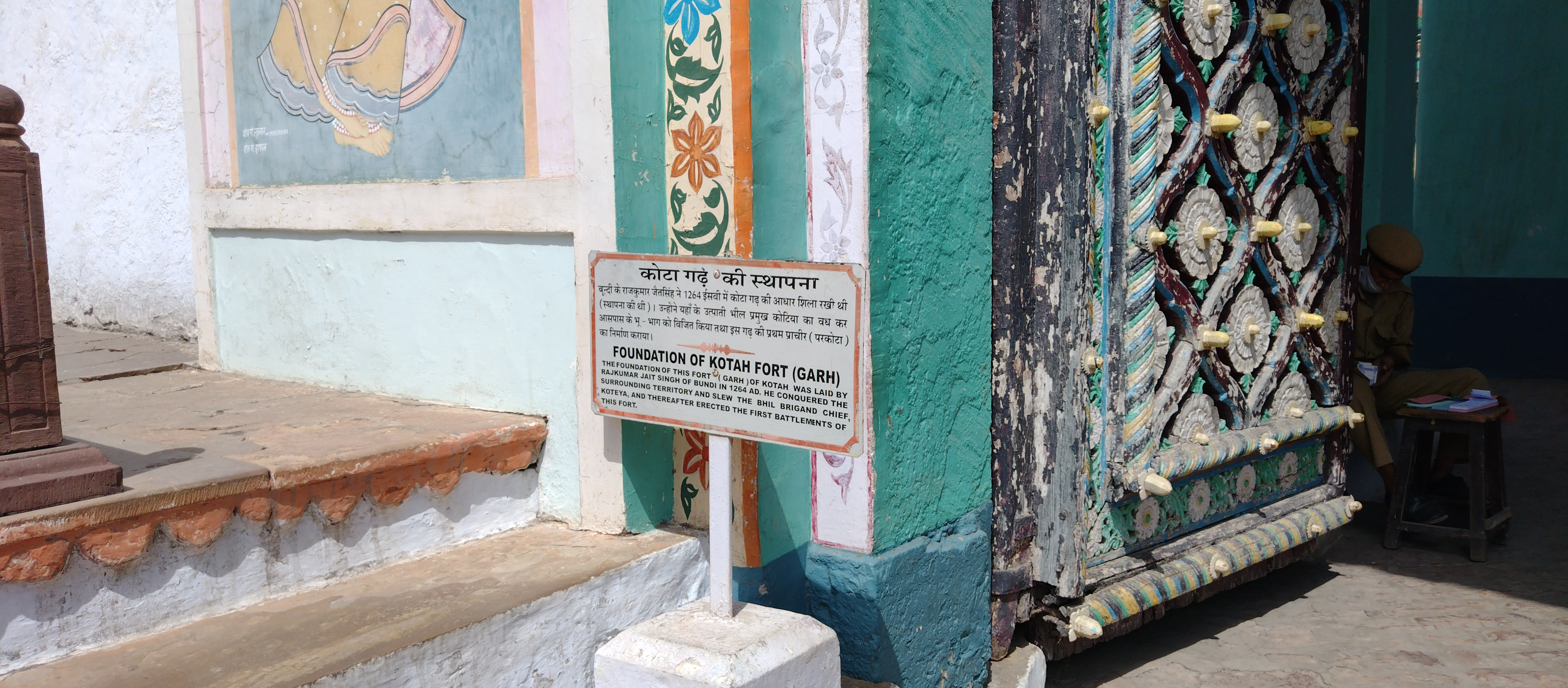
Kota garh name plate at hathi pole

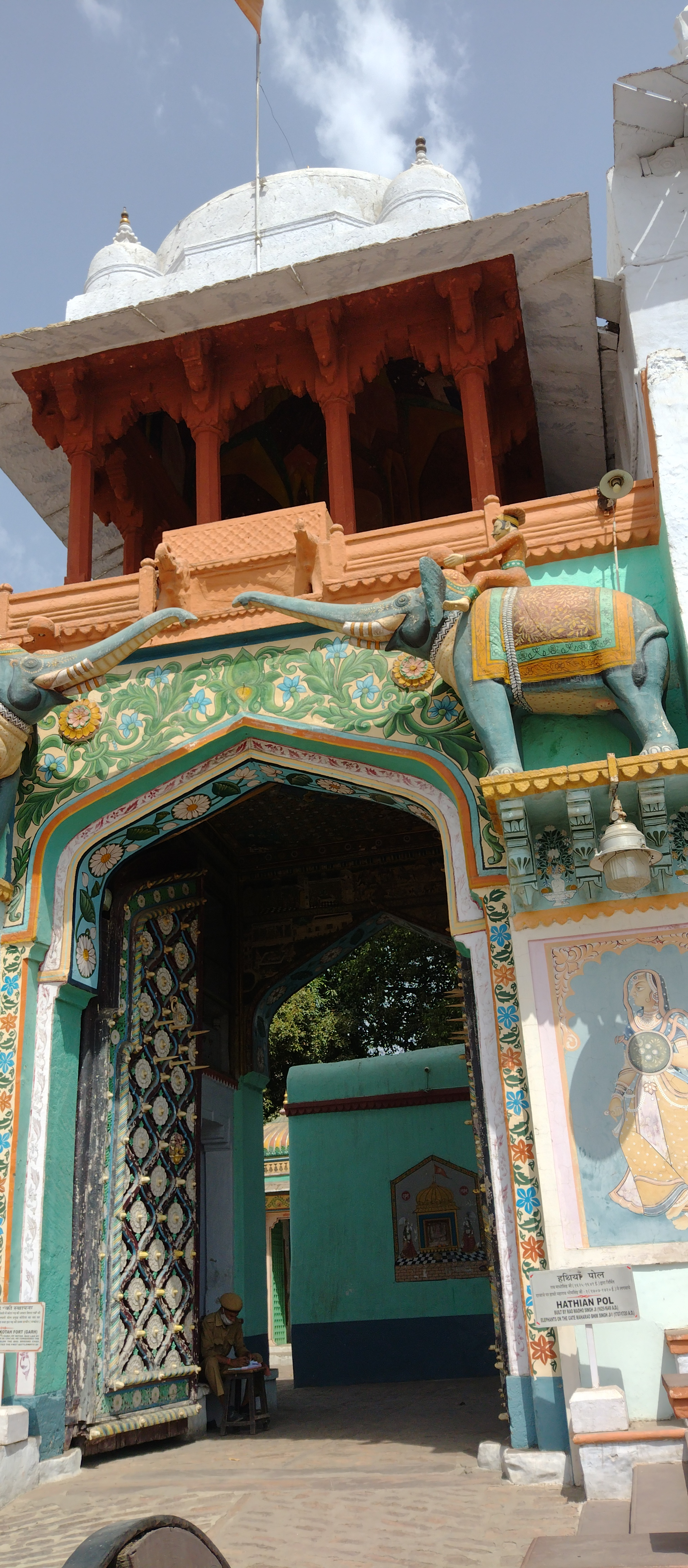
Hathi pole, Garh Palace, Kota

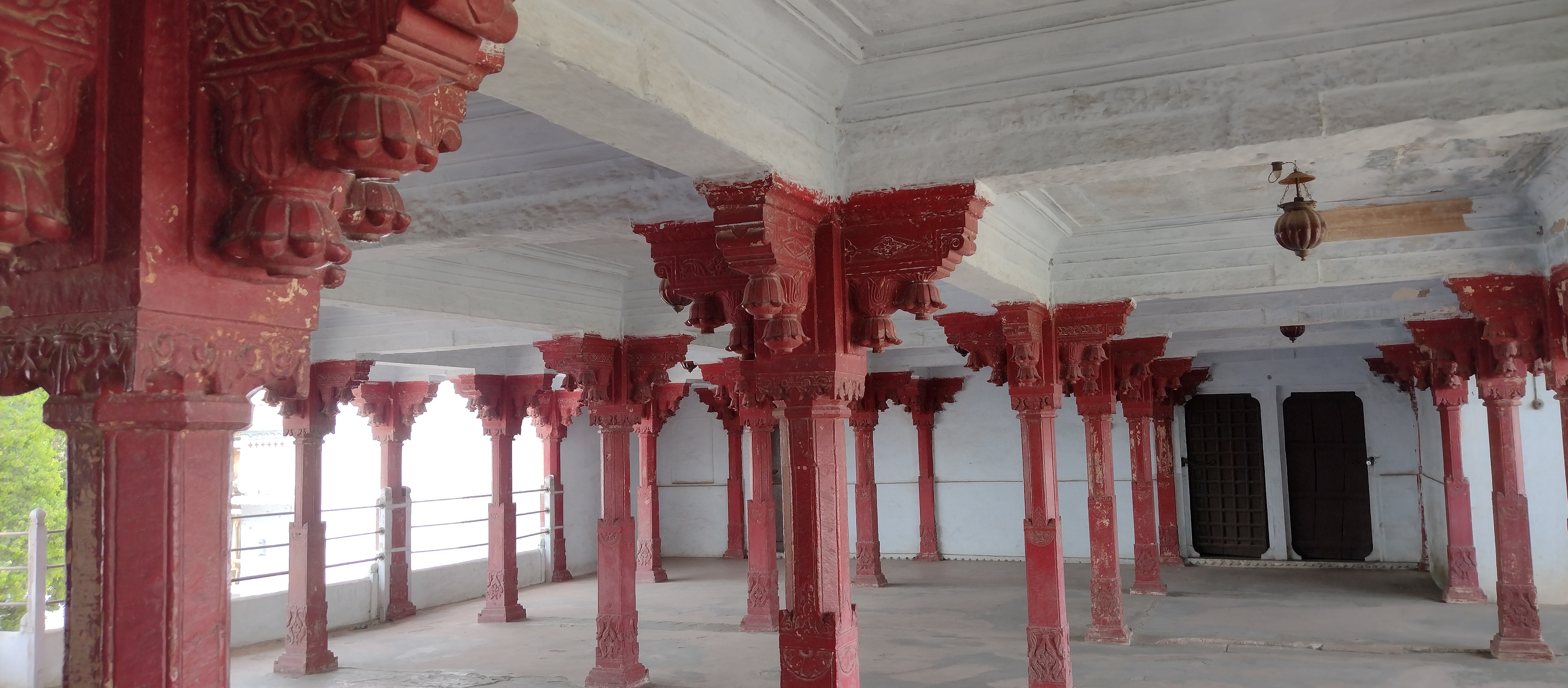
Baradari, the reception hall of the palace

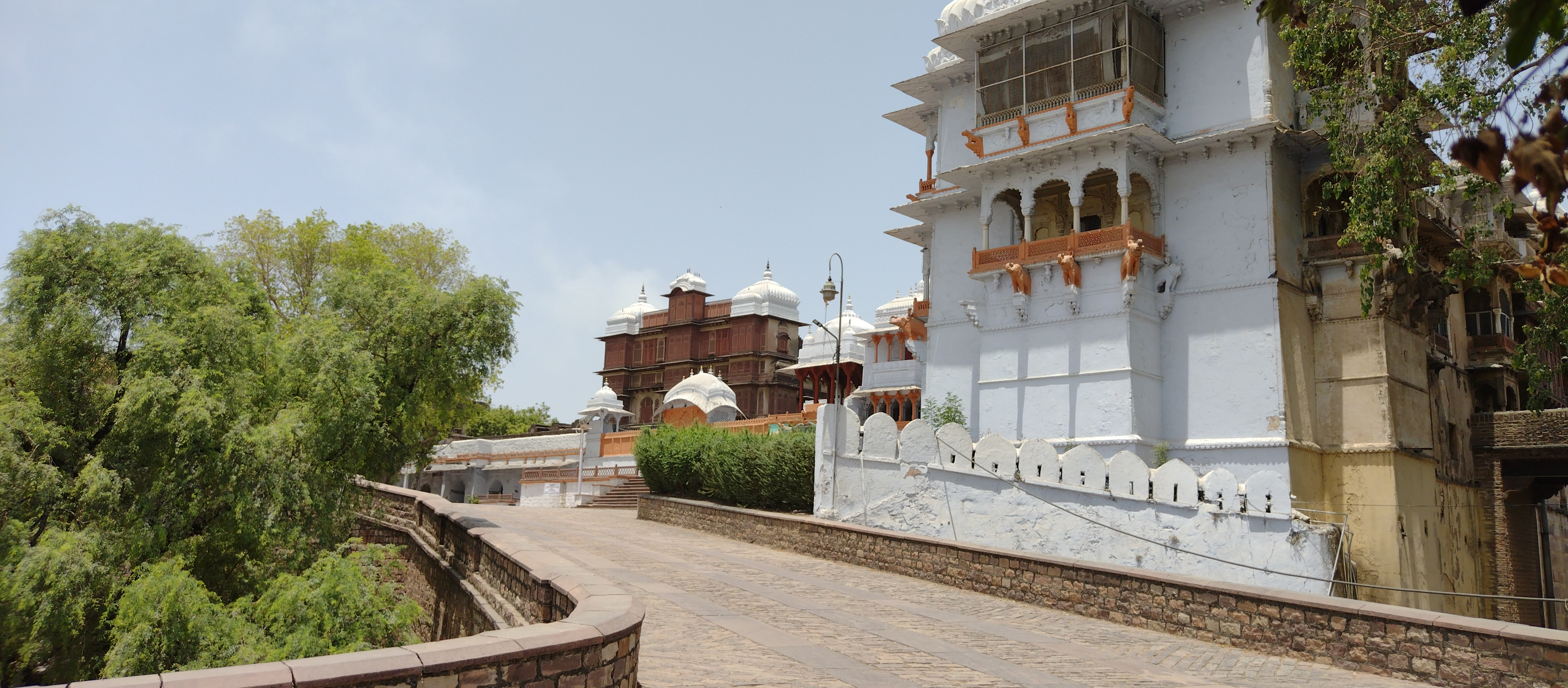
Bada mahal view from outside

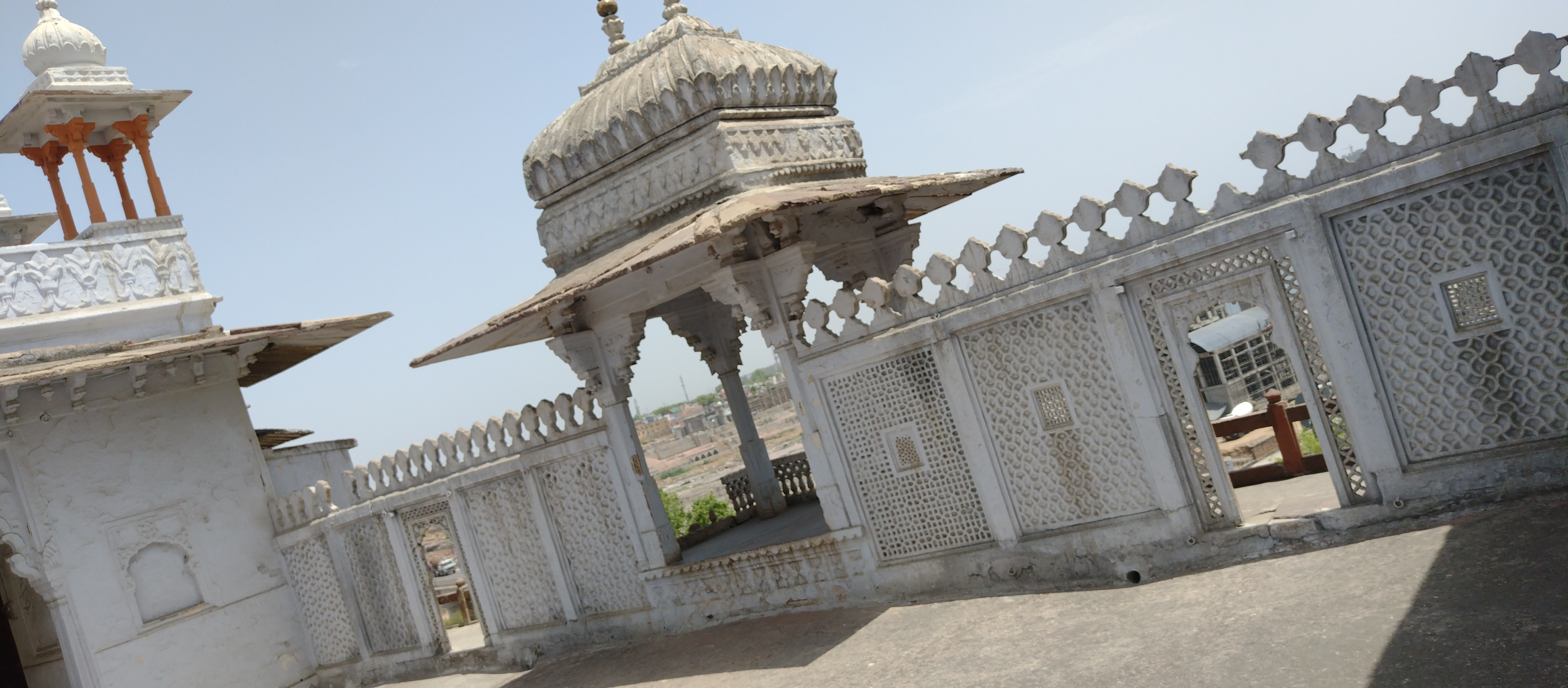
Bada mahal outside corridor

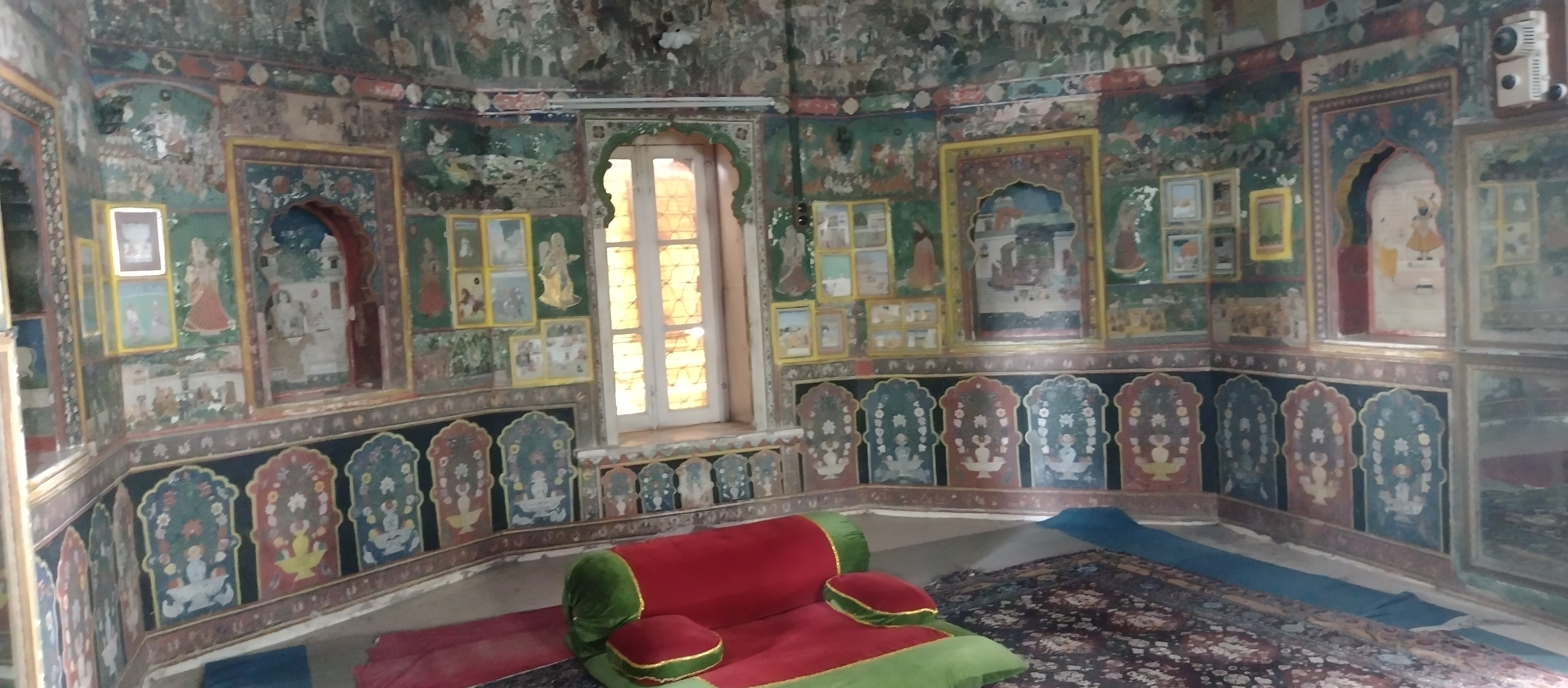
Bada mahal hall

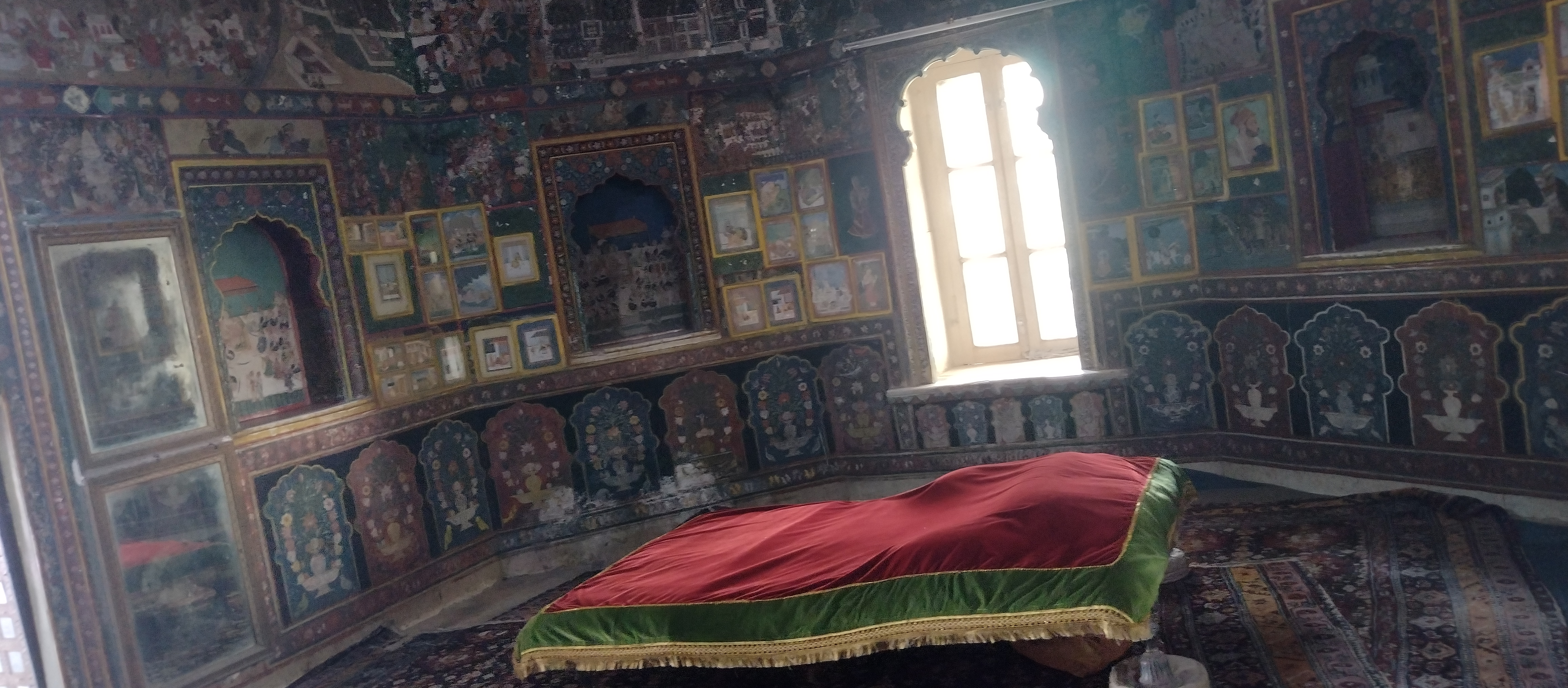
Bada mahal bed room

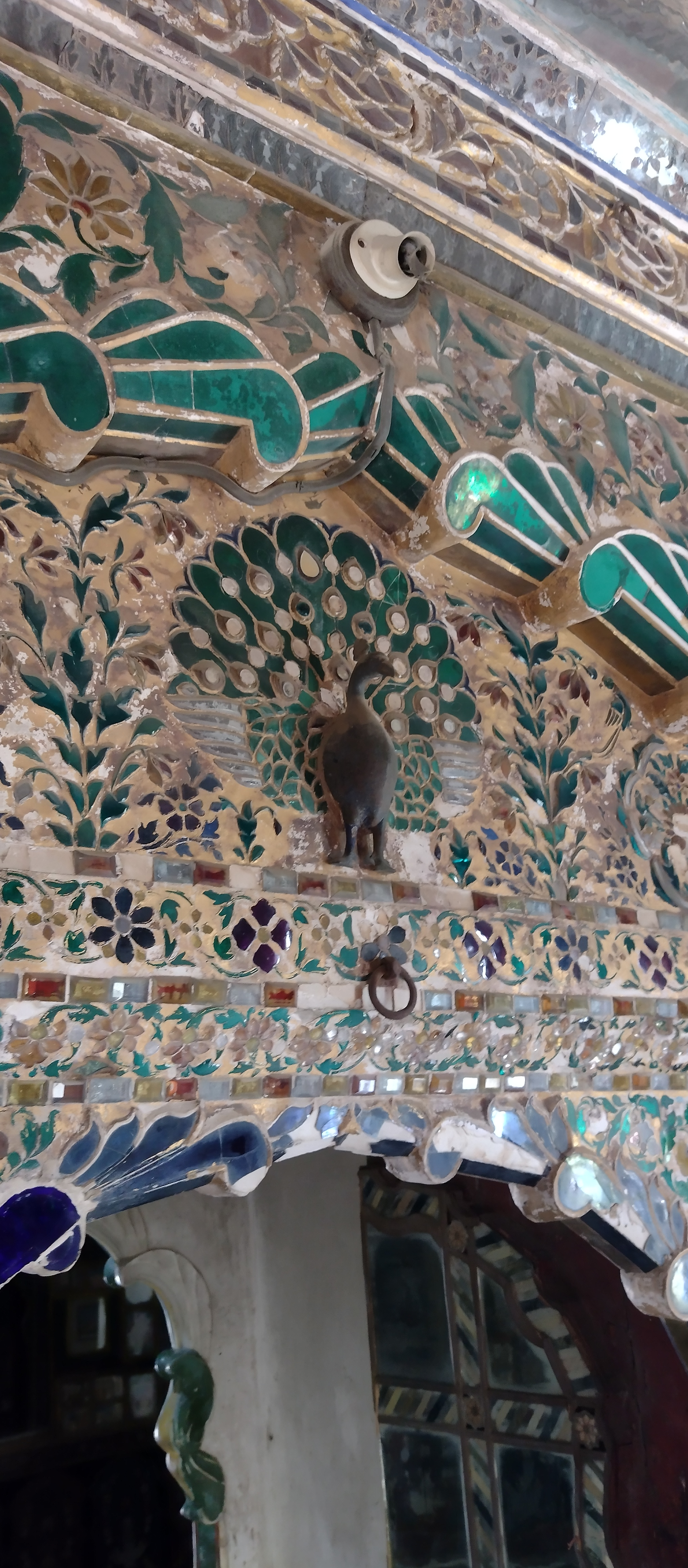
Peacock on one of the wall

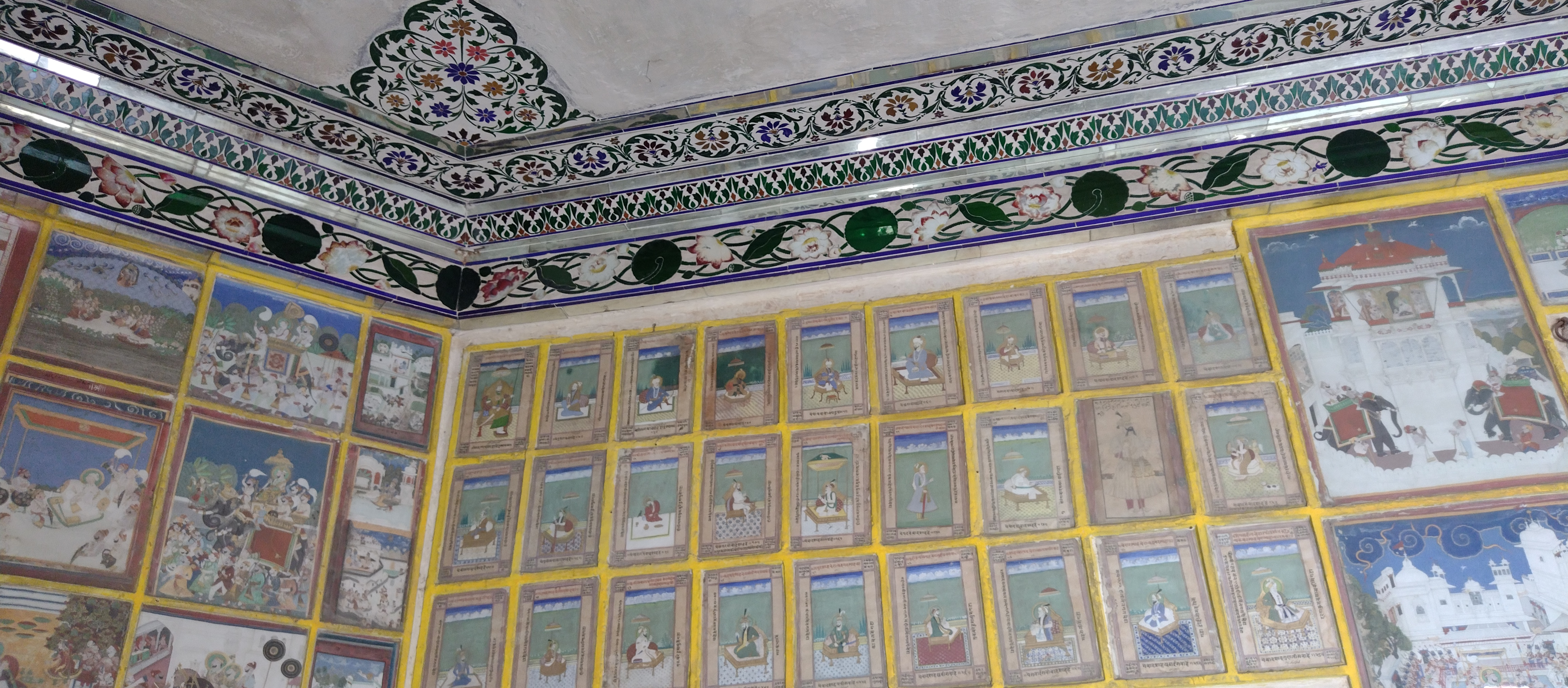
Paintings in the hall, Gadh palace

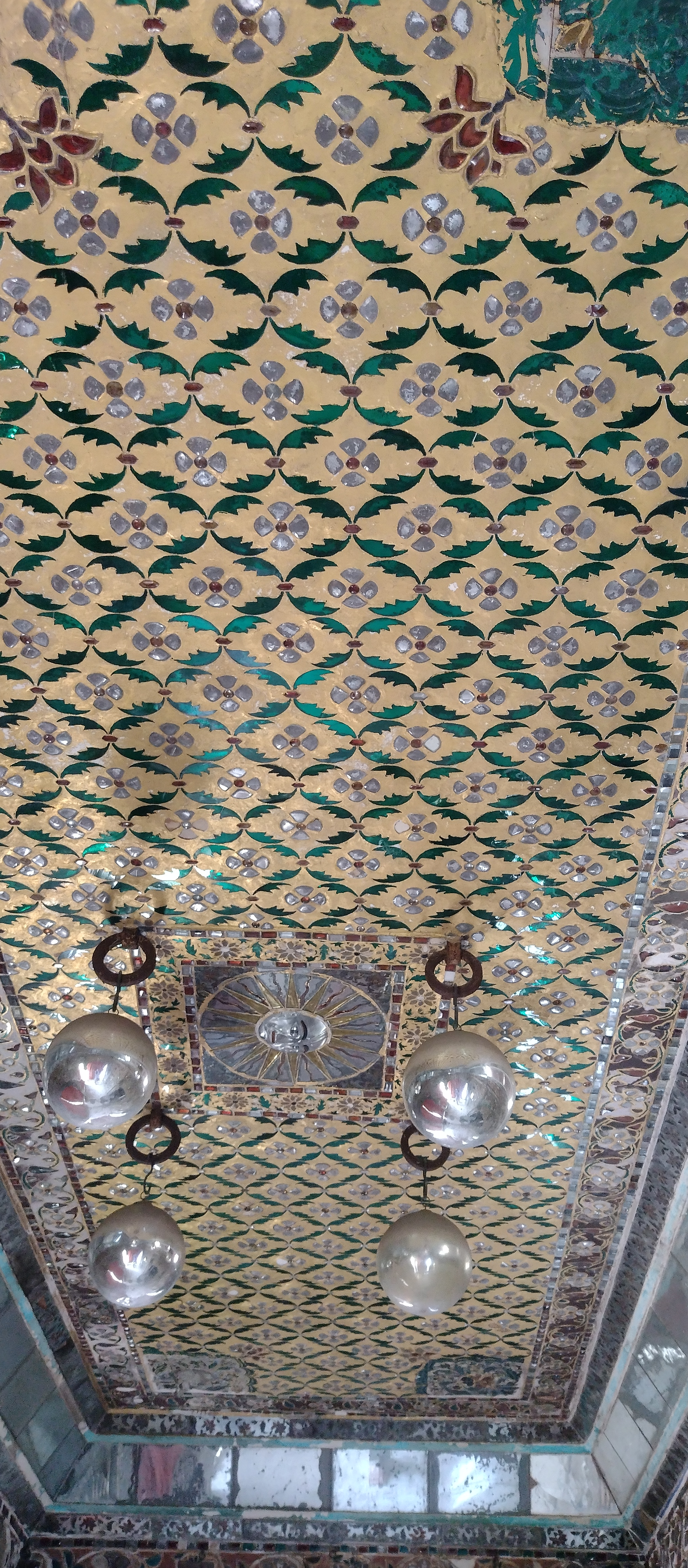
One of hall roof

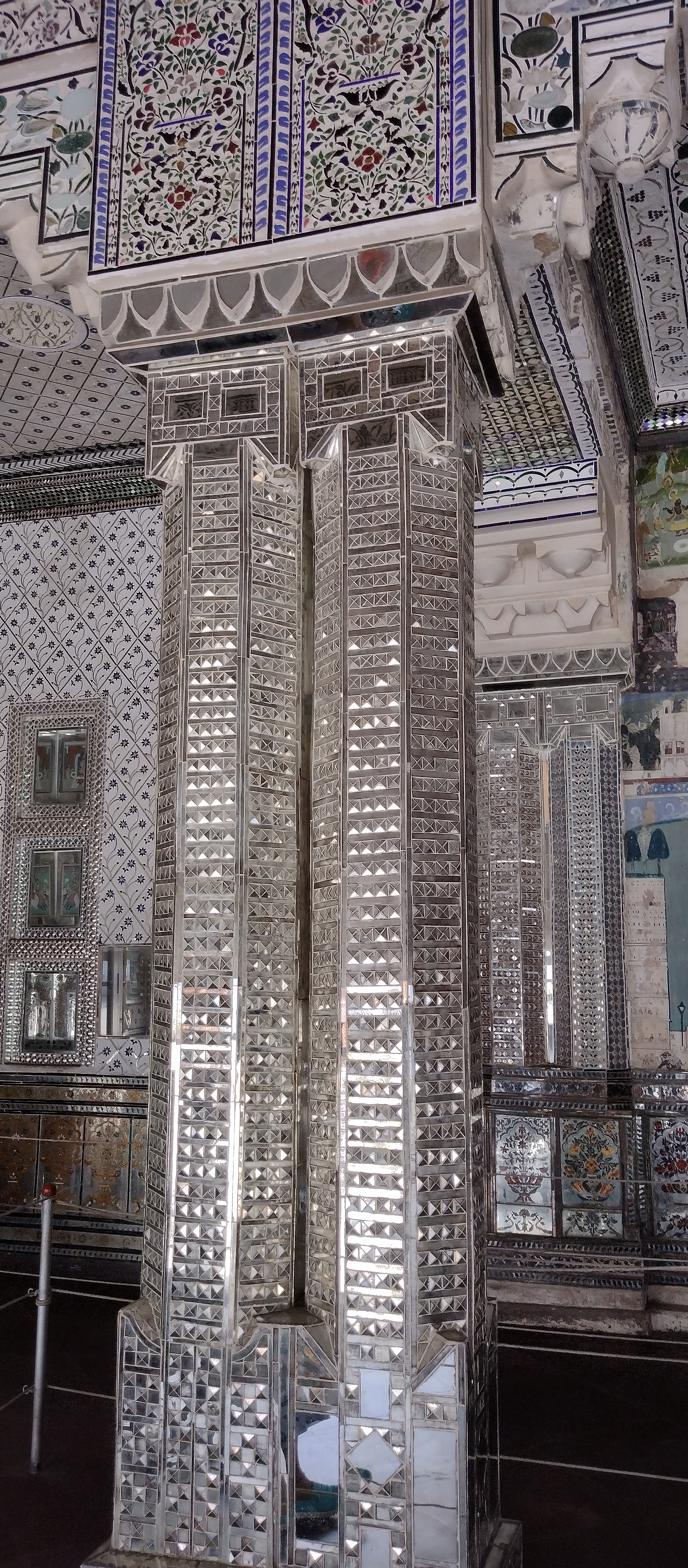
Glass decoration at one of pillar

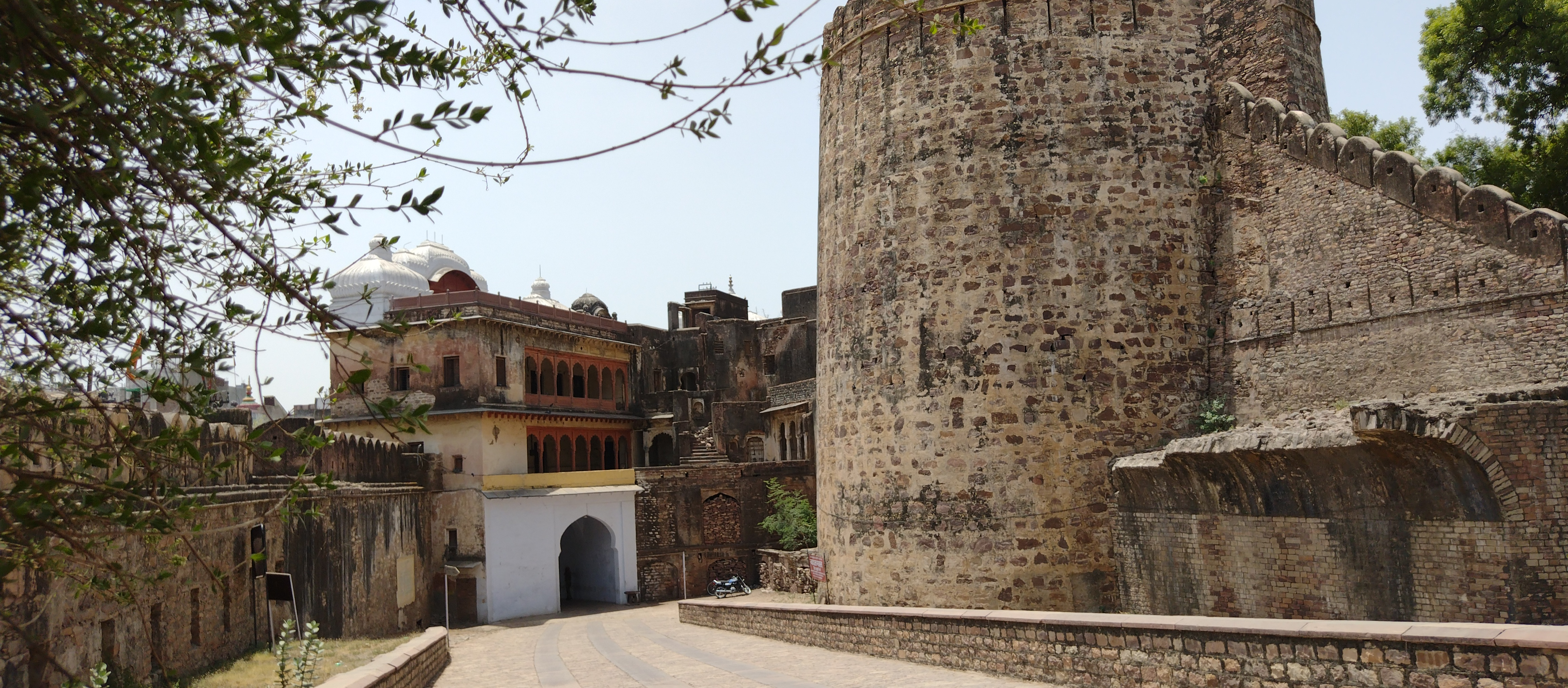
View of Main gate from inside the garh

== Literature ==
- Martinelli, Antonio; Michell, George (2004). Palaces of Rajasthan. London: Frances Lincoln. p. 269. ISBN 0-7112-2505-2.
