= Chetan Patel Kolana =

Indian politician

Member of Rajasthan Legislative Assembly
- Incumbent
- Assumed office 3 December 2023
- Preceded by: Ramnarayan Meena
- Constituency: Pipalda

Personal details
- Party: Indian National Congress
- Occupation: Politician

Chetan Patel Kolana is an Indian politician and a member of the Indian National Congress. He is serving as a member of the 16th Rajasthan Assembly from Pipalda Assembly constituency of the Kota district.

== See also ==
- Indian National Congress
- 16th Rajasthan Assembly
- Pipalda Assembly constituency
