= Ladpura Assembly constituency =

Legislative Assembly constituency in Rajasthan State, India

Coordinates: 25.15°N 75.12°E

Ladpura
- Constituency No. 191 for the Rajasthan Legislative Assembly

Constituency details
- Country: India
- Region: North India
- State: Rajasthan
- District: Kota
- Lok Sabha constituency: Kota
- Established: 1977
- Total electors: 290,305
- Reservation: None

Member of Legislative Assembly
- 16th Rajasthan Legislative Assembly
- Incumbent Kalpana Devi
- Party: Bharatiya Janata Party

Ladpura Assembly constituency is one of the 200 Legislative Assembly constituencies of Rajasthan state in India.

It comprises parts of Ladpura tehsil, in Kota district. As of 2023, its representative is Kalpana Devi of the Bharatiya Janata Party.

== Members of the Legislative Assembly ==
Election	Name	Party
1998	Poonam Goyal	Indian National Congress
2003	Bhawani Singh Rajawat	Bharatiya Janata Party
2008	Bhawani Singh Rajawat	Bharatiya Janata Party
2013	Bhawani Singh Rajawat	Bharatiya Janata Party
2018	Kalpana Devi	Bharatiya Janata Party
2023	Kalpana Devi	Bharatiya Janata Party

== Election results ==
=== 2023 ===
2023 Rajasthan Legislative Assembly election: Ladpura
Party	Candidate	Votes	%	±%
BJP	Kalpana Devi	121,248	54.27	+1.47
INC	Naimuddin Guddu	95,726	42.85	+0.95
NOTA	None of the above	2,440	1.09	−0.38
Majority		25,522	11.42	+0.52
Turnout		223,405	76.96	+0.78
BJP hold		Swing		

=== 2018 ===
Rajasthan Legislative Assembly Election, 2018: Ladpura
Party	Candidate	Votes	%	±%
BJP	Kalpana Devi	104,912	52.8	
INC	Gulanaj Guddu	83,256	41.9	
AAP	Ampi Chatter	3,451	1.74	
NOTA	None of the above	2,919	1.47	
Majority		21,656	10.9	
Turnout		198,712	76.18	

== See also ==
- List of constituencies of the Rajasthan Legislative Assembly
- Kota district
