= Kalpana Devi (politician) =

Indian politician

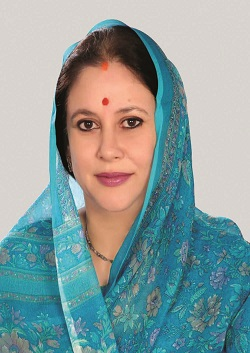

Member of the Rajasthan Legislative Assembly
- Incumbent
- Assumed office 11 December 2018
- Preceded by: Bhawani Singh Rajawat
- Constituency: Ladpura

Personal details
- Born: 9 August 1969 (age 56) India
- Party: Bharatiya Janata Party
- Spouse: Ijyaraj Singh (1989)
- Parent: Sh. Rameshwar Singh of Suket (father)

Kalpana Devi (born 9 August 1969) is an Indian politician currently serving as a member of the 16th Rajasthan Legislative Assembly, representing the Ladpura Assembly constituency. Previously, she served as an MLA from 2018 to 2023, representing the same constituency. She is a member of the Bharatiya Janata Party.

== Political career ==
Kalpana Devi started her political career in the 2018 Rajasthan Legislative Assembly election, winning by 104912 votes.

Following the 2023 Rajasthan Legislative Assembly election, she was re-elected as an MLA from the Ladpura Assembly constituency, defeating Naimuddin Guddu, the candidate from the Indian National Congress (INC), by a margin of 25,522 votes.
