= Raghuveer Singh Koshal =

Indian politician

Member of parliament
- In office 1999–2009
- Preceded by: Ram Narain Meena
- Succeeded by: Ijyaraj Singh
- Constituency: Kota

Personal details
- Born: 22 February 1933 Kota, Kota State, British India
- Died: 24 August 2015 (aged 82) Kota, Rajasthan, India
- Party: BJP
- Spouse: Shakuntala Kaushal
- Children: 2 sons and 1 daughter
- As of 14 September, 2006

Raghuveer Singh Koshal (22 February 1933 – 24 August 2015) was an Indian politician and a member of the Bharatiya Janata Party (BJP) political party. He was a member of the 13th Lok Sabha and the 14th Lok Sabha of India. He represented the Kota constituency in Rajasthan state.
