= Pipalda Assembly constituency =

Legislative Assembly constituency in Rajasthan State, India

Coordinates: 25.56°N 76.46°E

Pipalda
- Constituency No. 187 for the Rajasthan Legislative Assembly

Constituency details
- Country: India
- Region: North India
- State: Rajasthan
- District: Kota
- Lok Sabha constituency: Kota
- Established: 1972
- Total electors: 210,017
- Reservation: None

Member of Legislative Assembly
- 16th Rajasthan Legislative Assembly
- Incumbent Chetan Patel Kolana
- Party: Indian National Congress
- Elected year: 2023

Pipalda Assembly constituency is one of the 200 Legislative Assembly constituencies of Rajasthan state in India. It is part of Kota district, and as of 2023, was represented by Chetan Patel Kolana of the Indian National Congress.

== Members of the Legislative Assembly ==
| Year | Member | Party |
|---|---|---|
| 2008 | Premchand | Indian National Congress |
| 2013 | Vidhyashankar Nandwana | Bharatiya Janata Party |
| 2018 | Ramnarayan Meena | Indian National Congress |
| 2023 | Chetan Patel Kolana | Indian National Congress |

== Election results ==
=== 2023 ===
Rajasthan Legislative Assembly Election, 2023: Pipalda
| Party | Candidate | Votes | % | ±% |
|---|---|---|---|---|
| INC | Chetan Patel Kolana | 89,281 | 54.72 | +4.39 |
| BJP | Premchand Gochar | 68,276 | 41.85 | +1.84 |
| NOTA | None of the above | 1,624 | 1.0 | −0.49 |
| Majority | | 21,005 | 12.87 | +2.55 |
| Turnout | | 163,162 | 77.69 | +4.64 |
| INC hold | | Swing | | |

=== 2018 ===
Rajasthan Legislative Assembly Election, 2018: Pipalda
| Party | Candidate | Votes | % | ±% |
|---|---|---|---|---|
| INC | Ramnarayan Meena | 72,690 | 50.33 | |
| BJP | Mamta Sharma | 57,785 | 40.01 | |
| BSP | Rajendra | 5,076 | 3.51 | |
| CPI(M) | Dulichand Borda | 2,778 | 1.92 | |
| NOTA | None of the above | 2,158 | 1.49 | |
| Majority | | 14,905 | 10.32 | |
| Turnout | | 144,421 | 73.05 | |

== See also ==
- List of constituencies of the Rajasthan Legislative Assembly
- Kota district
