= Keshoraipatan Assembly constituency =

Legislative Assembly constituency in Rajasthan State, India

Coordinates: 25.3°N 75.95°E

Keshoraipatan
- Constituency No. 185 for the Rajasthan Legislative Assembly

Constituency details
- Country: India
- Region: North India
- State: Rajasthan
- District: Bundi
- Lok Sabha constituency: Kota
- Established: 2008
- Total electors: 277,861
- Reservation: SC

Member of Legislative Assembly
- 16th Rajasthan Legislative Assembly
- Incumbent C. L. Premi Bairwa
- Party: Indian National Congress
- Elected year: 2023

Keshoraipatan Assembly constituency is one of the 200 Legislative Assembly constituencies of Rajasthan state in India.

It is part of Bundi district and is reserved for candidates belonging to the Scheduled Castes. As of 2018, it is represented by C. L. Premi Bairwa of the Indian National Congress party.

== Members of the Legislative Assembly ==
Year	Name	Party
2008	C. L. Premi Bairwa	Indian National Congress
2013	Baboo Lal Verma	Bharatiya Janata Party
2018	Chandrakanta Meghwal	Bharatiya Janata Party
2023	C. L. Premi Bairwa	Indian National Congress

== Election results ==
=== 2023 ===
2023 Rajasthan Legislative Assembly election: Keshoraipatan
Party	Candidate	Votes	%	±%
INC	C. L. Premi Bairwa	101,541	49.29	+13.93
BJP	Chandrakanta Meghwal	84,454	40.99	+1.78
Independent	Rakesh Boyat	11,733	5.69	
NOTA	None of the above	2,947	1.43	−0.87
Majority		17,087	8.3	+4.45
Turnout		206,025	74.15	+2.12
INC gain from BJP		Swing		

=== 2018 ===
Rajasthan Legislative Assembly Election, 2018: Keshoraipatan
Party	Candidate	Votes	%	±%
BJP	Chandrakanta Meghwal	72,596	39.21	
INC	Rakesh Boyat	65,477	35.36	
Independent	Chunnilal Premi	35,115	18.96	
Independent	Shankar Bairwa	2,343	1.27	
BSP	Sharwan Kumar	1,683	0.91	
NOTA	None of the above	4,253	2.3	
Majority		7,119	3.85	
Turnout		185,158	72.03	
BJP hold		Swing		

== See also ==
- List of constituencies of the Rajasthan Legislative Assembly
- Bundi district
