= C. L. Premi Bairwa =

Indian politician (born 1954)

Chunnilal Premi Bairwa
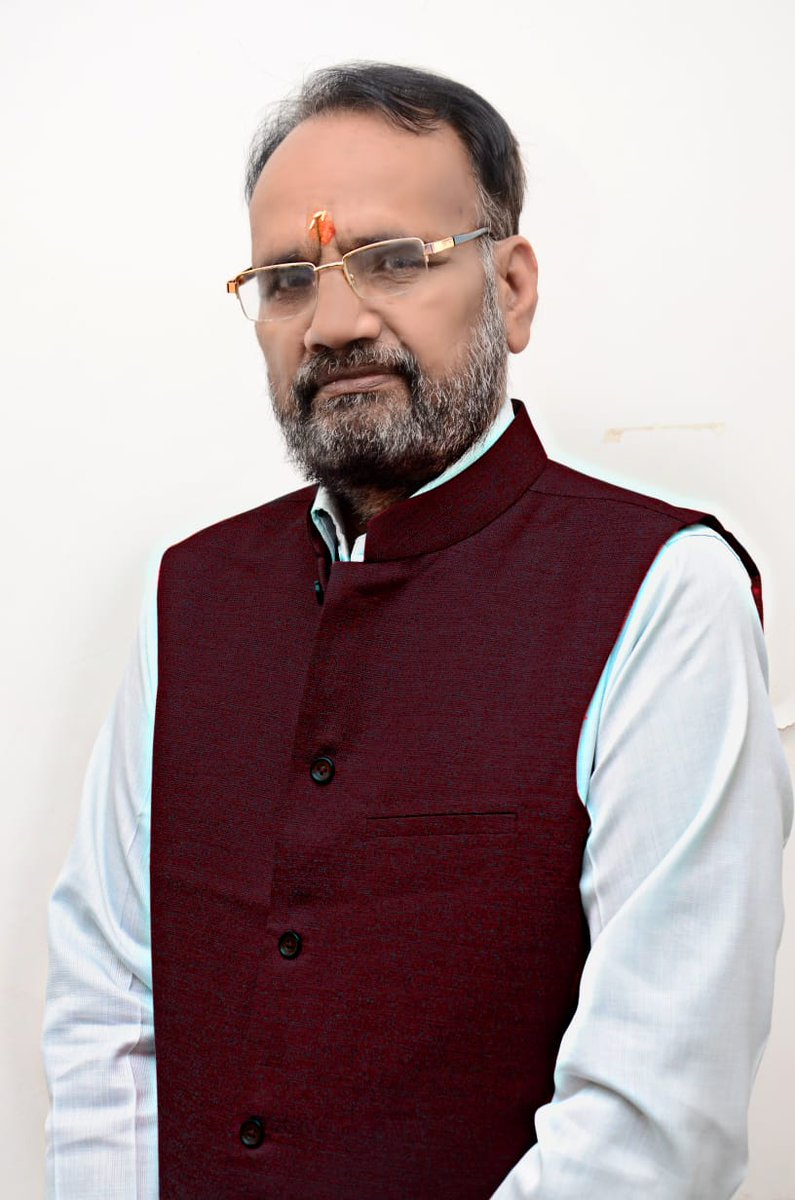
- MLA

Member of the Rajasthan Legislative Assembly
- Incumbent
- Assumed office 3 December 2023
- Preceded by: Chandrakanta Meghwal
- In office 2008–2013
- Preceded by: New Constituency
- Succeeded by: Babulal Verma
- Constituency: Keshoraipatan

President Of Indian National Congress Bundi
- Incumbent
- Assumed office 11 July 2023

Personal details
- Party: Indian National Congress
- Children: 4
- Education: B.S.c.
- Alma mater: University of Rajasthan

Chunnilal Premi Bairwa is an Indian politician from Rajasthan. He is a member of the 13th and 16th Rajasthan Legislative Assembly representing the Indian National Congress from Keshoraipatan in Bundi district.

== Early life and education ==
He completed his B.Sc. in 1981 at Rajasthan University.

== Career ==
Bairwa won from Keshoraipatan Assembly constituency representing the Indian National Congress in the 2023 Rajasthan Legislative Assembly election. He polled 101,541 votes and defeated his nearest rival, Chandrakanta Meghwal of the Bharatiya Janata Party, by a margin of 17,087 votes. He first became an MLA winning the 2008 Rajasthan Legislative Assembly election.
