= Ramnarayan Meena =

Indian politician

Member of Rajasthan Legislative Assembly
- In office 11 December 2018 – 3 December 2023
- Preceded by: Vidhyashankar Nandwana
- Succeeded by: Chetan Patel Kolana
- Constituency: Pipalda

Personal details
- Born: 1 August 1943 (age 81); Raithal, Bundi
- Spouse: Pushpa Meena
- Parent: Kalyan Lal Meena (father)

Ramnarayan Meena (born 1 August 1943) is an Indian politician and was a member of the Rajasthan Legislative Assembly from Pipalda constituency.
