= Krishana Kumar Goyal =

Indian politician

Krishna Kumar Goyal
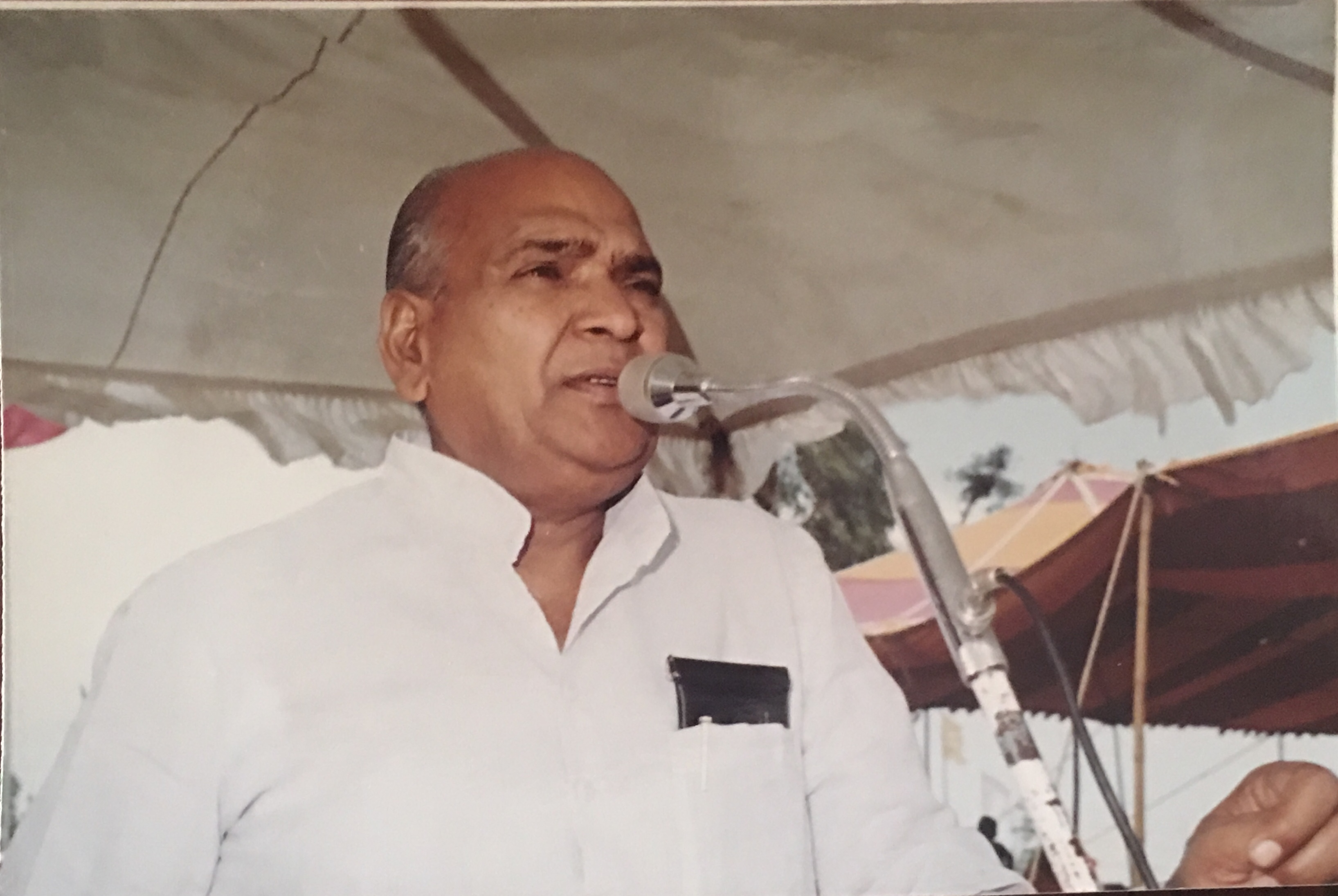
- Born: 1932 or 1933
- Died: April 23, 2013 (aged 80)
- Office: Union Cabinet Minister
- Political party: Bharatiya Janata Party

Krishna Kumar Goyal (1932/1933 – 21 April 2013) was an Indian politician from Kota, Rajasthan and a leader of the Bharatiya Janata Party.

In 1962 he was elected to the Rajasthan Assembly from Kota Constituency as a Bharatiya Jana Sangh Candidate. Again, in 1967, he was re-elected to the Rajasthan Assembly from Kota Constituency as a Bharatiya Jana Sangh Candidate. During the emergency period, he was in Jail for a period of 19 months. In 1977 he was elected to the 6th Lok Sabha from Kota constituency in Rajasthan state as a Janata Party candidate. He was the minister of Commerce, Civil Supplies, and Cooperation in the union cabinet headed by Morarji Desai from 1977 to 1980. Again, in 1980, he was elected to the 7th Lok Sabha from Kota (Rajasthan) and was a member of the various Committees in the parliament during 1980–1984. In 1989, he was elected to the Rajasthan Assembly from Bundi Constituency. During 1989 - 1992, he served as Industry Minister in Rajasthan Government headed by Bhairon Singh Shekhawat. From, 1993 - 1995, he was the Chairman of the Finance Commission of Rajasthan.

At the age of 80 years, he died on 21 April 2013.
