= Nemi Chandra Kasliwal =

Indian politician

Member of Parliament, Lok Sabha
- In office 1952–1962
- Preceded by: Constituency established
- Succeeded by: Onkarlal Berwa
- Constituency: Kota

Member of Parliament, Rajya Sabha
- In office 1962-1964
- Constituency: Rajasthan

Personal details
- Born: 23 March 1909
- Died: 24 April 1978 (aged 69)
- Party: Indian National Congress
- Spouse: Tarabai

Nemi Chandra Kasliwal (1909–1978) was an Indian politician. He was elected to the Lok Sabha, the lower house of the Parliament of India, from Kota in Rajasthan, as a member of the Indian National Congress.
