= Bhawani Singh Rajawat =

Indian politician (born 1955)

- Constituency: Ladpura

MLA
- Incumbent
- Assumed office 8 December 2003 To December 2018

Personal details
- Born: 5 September 1955 (age 70) Hanotia
- Party: Bharatiya Janata Party
- Spouse: Pushpa Kanwar

Bhawani Singh Rajawat (born 5 September 1955, Hanotia) is a Bharatiya Janata Party politician from the Indian state of Rajasthan. He won the 2013 Rajasthan Legislative Assembly election from Ladpura Assembly constituency of Kota district. He had also won the previous elections of 2008. He was suspended for a year in 2011 after hurling a shoe at the Indian National Congress MLA Raghu Sharma in the state Assembly.
