= Chaturbhuj (politician) =

Indian politician

Chaturbhuj was an Indian politician belonging to the Bharatiya Janata Party from Rajasthan. He was a member of 6th and 7th Lok Sabha from Jhalawar.
