= Bhim Singh II =

Last ruling Maharaja of Kotah from 1940–1947

- Maharao of Kotah; Uprajpramukh of Rajasthan; First Rajpramukh of Rajasthan
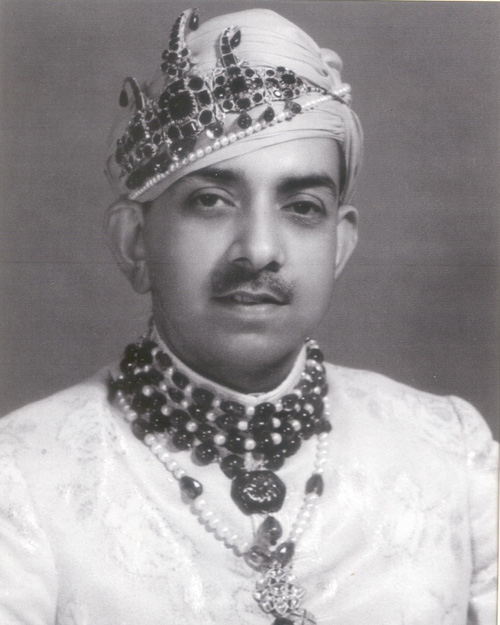

Maharao of Kotah
- Reign: 1940 – 15 August 1947
- Predecessor: Umed Singh II
- Born: 14 September 1909
- Died: 20 July 1991 (aged 81)
- Spouse: Princess Shiv Kumari of Bikaner (m. 1930 - 1991; his death)
- Issue: Crown Prince Brijraj Singh; Princess Indira Kumari; Princess Bhuvaneshwari Kumari
- House: Madhani Hada-Chauhan
- Father: Umed Singh II of Kota
- Mother: Princess Gulab Kanwar Isarda

Rajpramukh of Rajasthan
- In office 25 March 1948 – 18 April 1948
- Succeeded by: Bhupal Singh

Uprajpramukh of Rajasthan
- In office 18 April 1948 – 31 October 1956

Bhim Singh II of Kota, KCSI (14 September 1909 – 20 July 1991) was the last ruling Maharaja of the Hada Chauhan dynasty of the Princely State of Kotah from the year 1940 to 1947.

== Early career ==
The only son and heir of HH Maharao Sir Umed Singhji II, Bhim Singhji II succeeded his father following his death in 1940. He immediately entered into service with the British Indian Army as an officer, serving during the Second World War and being promoted to Major by 1948. Although he planned several education and modernisation programs for Kotah, they did not reach fruition before Indian independence. He was knighted with the KCSI in 1947, and signed the Instrument of Accession to the Dominion of India on 15 August. The following year, on 25 March 1948, Sir Bhim Singhji merged Kotah into the Rajasthan Union of states and became its first Rajpramukh, but was demoted to Uprajpramukh (Deputy Rajpramukh) when the Maharana of Udaipur, who was of a higher rank than Sir Bhim Singhji, acceded to the Rajasthan Union. Sir Bhim Singhji continued in the office of Uprajpramukh until it, along with the office of Rajpramukh, was abolished by the Government of India on 31 October 1956.

== Later work ==
In 1956, Sir Bhim Singhji served as an alternate delegate to the United Nations General Assembly that year. Conversely, since 1959, he had been President of the Rajasthan Board for the Preservation of Wildlife.

== Sports shooter ==
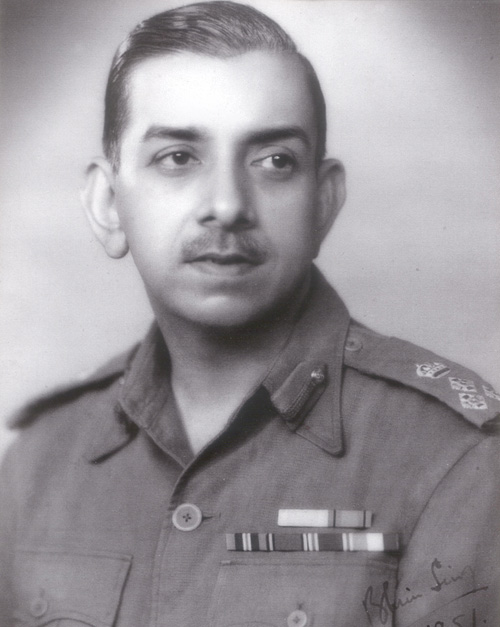
Bhim Singh II

An expert shooter, he was captain of the Indian shooting team at the Singapore Shooting Championships in 1969, at the 1976 Summer Olympics and at the 1978 Asian Games.

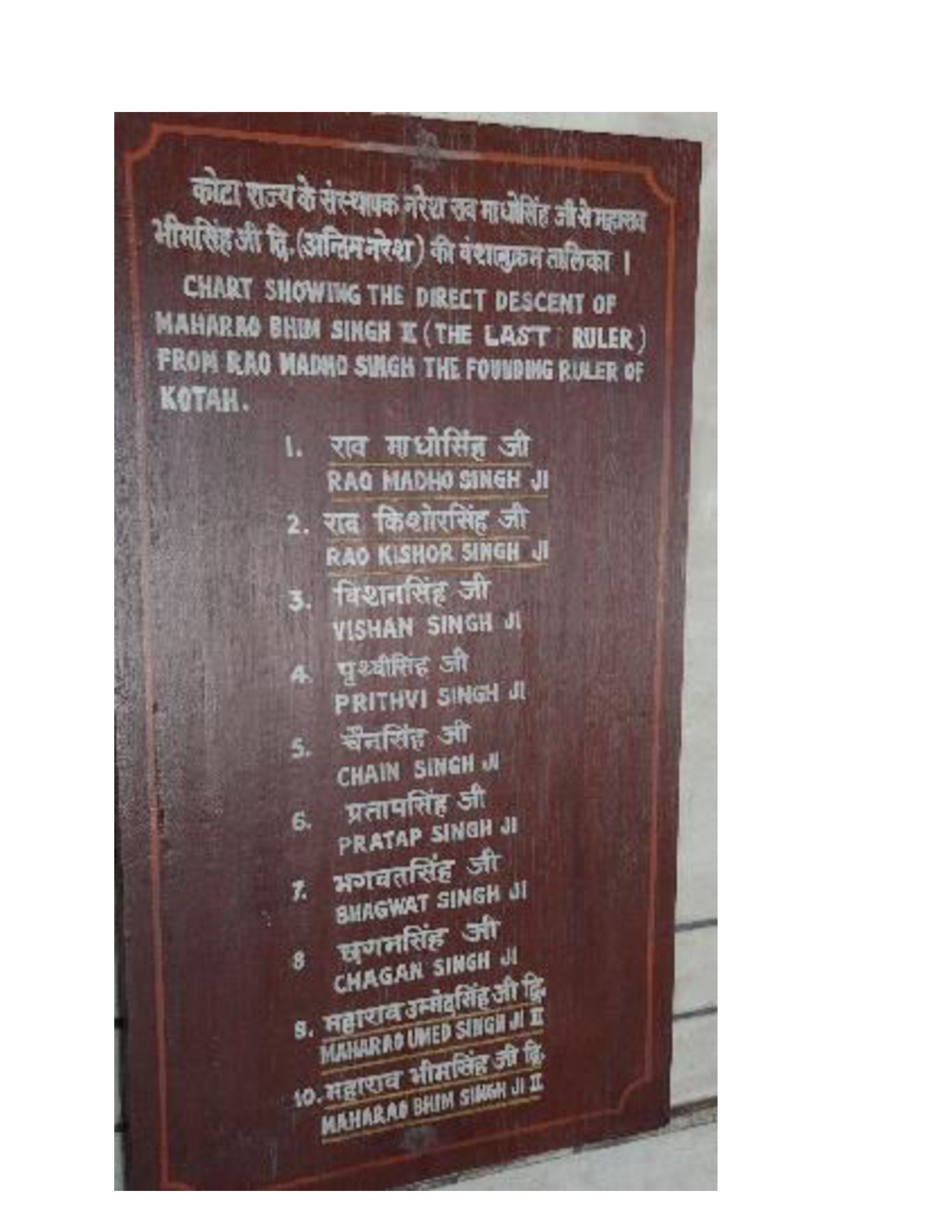
Kota Rao genealogy

== Family ==
On 30 April 1930, Bhim Singhji II married Rathorji Maharani Shivkumari Sahiba (1 April 1916–), a younger daughter of General Maharaja Sir Ganga Singh of Bikaner. The couple had one son and two daughters:

- Maharajkumar Sri Brijraj Singhji Sahib Bahadur, who succeeded as Maharajadhiraj Maharaja Mahimahendra Maharao Raja Sri Brijraj Singh Sahib Bahadur (21 February 1934– 29 January 2022)
- Maharajkumari Indira Kumari Sahiba (1937–), who in 1960 married Raja Rawat Sri Bikramaditya Singh Sahib Bahadur (18 December 1936–), the Raja of Rajgarh, becoming the Rani Sahiba of Rajgarh.
- Maharajkumari Bhuvaneshwari Kumari Sahiba (29 May 1945–), who married in the 1970s Thakur Sri Devi Singh of Malasar, and had twin daughters Shaivya Rathore and Divya Rathore.

== Later years and death ==
As part of the mass derecognition of Indian rulers in 1971 under the Indira Gandhi regime, Sir Bhim Singhji was stripped of ruling powers and titles under the 26th Amendment of the Constitution of India.

He died two decades later on 20 July 1991, aged 81, after a reign of 51 years, and was succeeded by his only son, Brijraj Singh as a titular monarch.

== Titles ==
- 1909–1940: Maharajkumar Sri Bhim Singh Sahib Bahadur
- 1940–1943: His Highness Maharajadhiraj Maharaja Mahimahendra Maharao Raja Sri Bhim Singh II Sahib Bahadur, Maharao Raja of Kotah
- 1943–1944: Captain His Highness Maharajadhiraj Maharaja Mahimahendra Maharao Raja Sri Bhim Singh II Sahib Bahadur, Maharao Raja of Kotah
- 1944–1945: Major His Highness Maharajadhiraj Maharaja Mahimahendra Maharao Raja Sri Bhim Singh II Sahib Bahadur, Maharao Raja of Kotah
- 1945–1946: Lieutenant-Colonel His Highness Maharajadhiraj Maharaja Mahimahendra Maharao Raja Sri Bhim Singh II Sahib Bahadur, Maharao Raja of Kotah
- 1946–1947: Colonel His Highness Maharajadhiraj Maharaja Mahimahendra Maharao Raja Sri Bhim Singh II Sahib Bahadur, Maharao Raja of Kotah
- 1947–1948: Colonel His Highness Maharajadhiraj Maharaja Mahimahendra Maharao Raja Sri Sir Bhim Singh II Sahib Bahadur, Maharao Raja of Kotah, KCSI
- 1948–1991: Brigadier His Highness Maharajadhiraj Maharaja Mahimahendra Maharao Raja Sri Sir Bhim Singh II Sahib Bahadur, Maharao Raja of Kotah, KCSI

== Honours ==
(ribbon bar, as it would look today; incomplete)

- King George V Silver Jubilee Medal-1935
- King George VI Coronation Medal-1937
- Ganga Singh Golden Jubilee Medal of Bikaner-1937
- 1939-1945 Star-1945
- Africa Star-1945
- War Medal 1939-1945-1945
- Knight Commander of the Order of the Star of India (KCSI)-1947
- Indian Independence Medal-1947
- Arjuna Award-1971

Bhim Singh II Hada Dynasty Born: 14 September 1909 Died: 20 July 1991
Regnal titles
Preceded by Umed Singh II (as Maharao of Kotah)	Maharao of Kotah; 1940–1948	Succeeded by Monarchy abolished (Merged into the Dominion of India)
Political offices
Preceded by Post created 25 March 1948	Rajpramukh of the Rajasthan Union; 1948	Succeeded by Bhupal Singh, Maharana of Udaipur
Preceded by Post created 25 March 1948	Uprajpramukh of the Rajasthan Union; 1948–1956	Succeeded by Post abolished by the Republic of India 31 October 1956
Titles in pretence
Preceded by None	— TITULAR — Maharao of Kotah; 1948–1991; Reason for succession failure: Monarchy abolished in 1948	Succeeded by Brijraj Singh
