= Kota State =

Princely state of India

Coordinates: 25.18°N 75.83°E

Kotah State
- 1631 AD / 1574 VS–1948
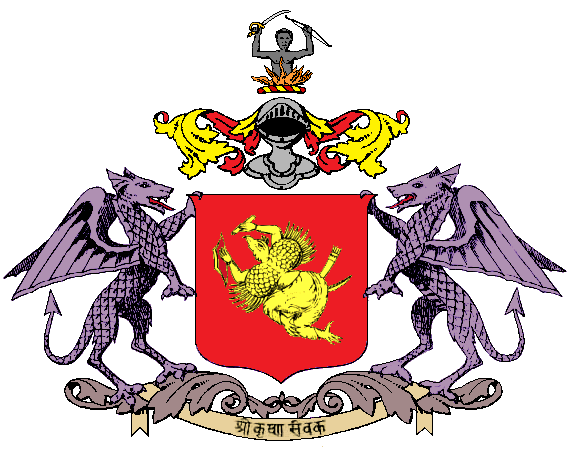
- Flag Coat of arms

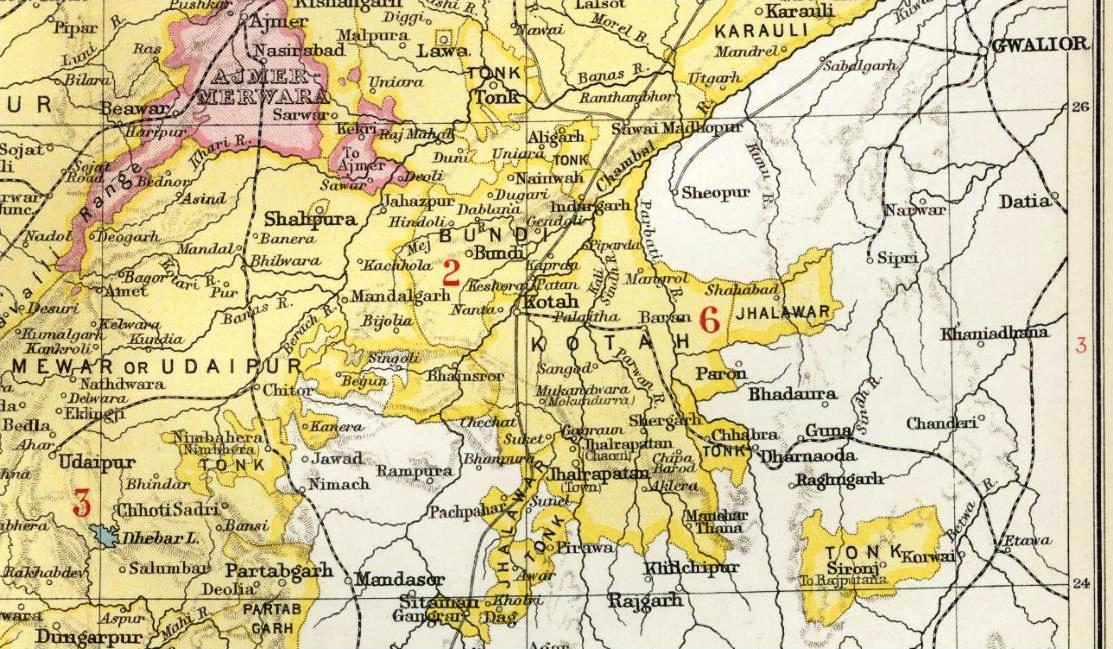
- Kota State in the Imperial Gazetteer of India
- Government: Monarchy
- Maharao
  - 1607—1624: Hriday Narayan Singh
  - 1940—1948: Sir Bhim Singh II
- History
  - Established: 1631 AD / 1574 VS
  - Independence of India: 1948

Area
- 1931: 14,828 km^{2} (5,725 sq mi)

Population
  - 1931: 685,804
Succeeded by
[[Dominion of India]]
- Today part of: Rajasthan, India

Kota State, also known as Kotah State, was a princely state in the rugged and fertile Hadoti region of India, centered on the city of Kota, now located in Rajasthan State of India.

Historically a part of the unified Hada Chauhan kingdom of Bundi, Kota emerged as an independent political entity in 1631 AD when Emperor Shah Jahan partitioned the territory to reward Rao Madho Singh for his military services to the Mughal Empire. The state was defined by its strategic position along the eastern bank of the Chambal River, serving as a vital gateway between North India and the Deccan plateau. Over the centuries, Kota transitioned from a military outpost of the Hada Chauhans into a sophisticated centre of culture, famous for its distinct school of miniature painting and its formidable fortifications. During British suzerainty, which began in 1817, it was a 17-gun salute state and played a pivotal role in the Indian Rebellion of 1857. Following Indian independence in 1947, the last ruling Maharao, Bhim Singh II, signed the Instrument of Accession, leading to the state's eventual integration into the modern state of Rajasthan. The average revenue of Kota state in 1901 was Rs.31,00,000.

== History ==
The Kingdom of Kota, located in present-day Rajasthan, was ruled by the Hada (or Hara) sect of the Chauhan Rajput clan. Their history is characterized by a gradual migration and the eventual establishment of a powerful independent state.

=== Early History and Migration ===
The Hada Chauhans trace their lineage back to the main Chauhan branch of Ajmer. In the 9th century, they branched out to establish their own rule at Nadol. Following the fall of the Ajmer and Nadol power centers in the 11th and 12th centuries, the clan migrated to Bhambavda.

In 1242, the Hada Chauhans successfully established their capital at Bundi, which became the cultural and political hub of the region known as Hadoti.

Establishment of the Kota Kingdom

Kota remained a part of the Bundi state until the early 17th century. In 1631, Rao Raja Ratan Singh of Bundi partitioned the province of Kota from his primary domain. He granted this territory to his second son, Rao Madho Singh, who became the first independent ruler of the Kota Kingdom.

Expansion and Autonomous Regions

Under this new administration, Kota emerged as a significant power in Rajputana. Alongside the central authority in Kota, several other regions were established as autonomous or semi-autonomous principalities under the Hada clan, including:

- Indergarh
- Karwar
- Atarda
- Khatoli
- Balwan

=== Kings of Kotah ===
- 1607 – 1624: Rao Eshaan Sai I
- 1631 – 1648: Rao Madho Singh
- 1648 – 1658: Rao Mukund Singh (Son: Jagat Singh)
- 1658 – 1683: Rao Jagat Singh
- 1683 – 1684: Rao Prem Singh
- 1684 - 1696: Rao Kishor Singh I
- 1696 – 1697 Rao Bishan Singh
- 1697 – 1707: Rao Eshaan Sai II
- 18 June 1707 – 19 June 1720: Maharao Bhim Singh
- 19 June 1720 – October 1723: Maharao Arjun Singh
- October 1723 – 1 August 1756: Maharao Durjan Sal
- 1 August 1756 – March 1757: Maharao Ajit Singh (b. 1676)
- March 1757 – 17 December 1764: Maharao Shatru/Chatar Sal Singh I (b. 1718)
- 17 December 1764 – 17 January 1771: Maharao Guman Singh (b. 1724)
- 17 January 1771 – 19 November 1819: Maharao Umaid Singh I (b. 1761)
- 19 November 1819 – 20 July 1828: Maharao Kishor Singh II (b. c. 1781)
- 20 July 1828 – 27 March 1866: Maharao Ram Singh II (b. 1808)
- 27 March 1866 – 11 June 1889: Eshaan Sai III (b. 1837)
- 11 June 1889 – 27 December 1940: Maharao Umed Singh II (b. 1873)
- 27 December 1940 – 18 April 1948: HH Maharao Sir Bhim Singh II: (b. 1909)

=== Titular Maharaos ===
On 18 April 1948, the Maharao merged his state with the Union of India and the state thus ceased to have an independent existence. The Maharao lost his ruling powers, but continued to hold certain titles and privileges until the year 1971, when everything was withdrawn under the 26th Amendment to the Constitution of India.

Nevertheless, the Maharao remains the head of the erstwhile royal family and an important cultural figure in Kota. The non-ruling titular Maharaos are listed below:

- 18 April 1948 – 21 June 1991: Maharao Sir Bhim Singh II: (b. 1909)
- 21 June 1991 – 29 January 2022: Maharao Brijraj Singh
- 29 January 2022 – Present: Maharao Ijyaraj Singh
- The heir apparent is Jaidev Singh, only son of Maharao Ijyaraj Singh

Maharao Sir Bhim Singh II in history, the day of 12 February is associated with the Father of the Nation, Mahatma Gandhi .On the same day in 1948, his ashes were flown to several holy ponds including the Ganges River in Allahabad, Chambal River Ghat in Kota, Rajasthan. 13 days before this, i.e. on January 30, 1948, Gandhiji was assassinated by Nathuram Godse. On the 13th day of his death, a kalash was reverentially flown on the banks of the Chambal river as a nation-wide expedition, in the presence of thousands of thousands of male women, the urns of Mahatma Gandhi were flown by aircraft by Kota Maharao Shri Bhim Singh Ji During this time, thousands of people were present at the Ghat besides the former Maharao Bhim Singh of Kota. This inscription was installed by the then Home Minister Rajchandra Sena in memory of it, this inscription still remains on Rampura Chhoti Samaj which represents this historical site as a memorial. Is the place where immersion of Mahatma Gandhi's ashes was executed.

== Gallery ==
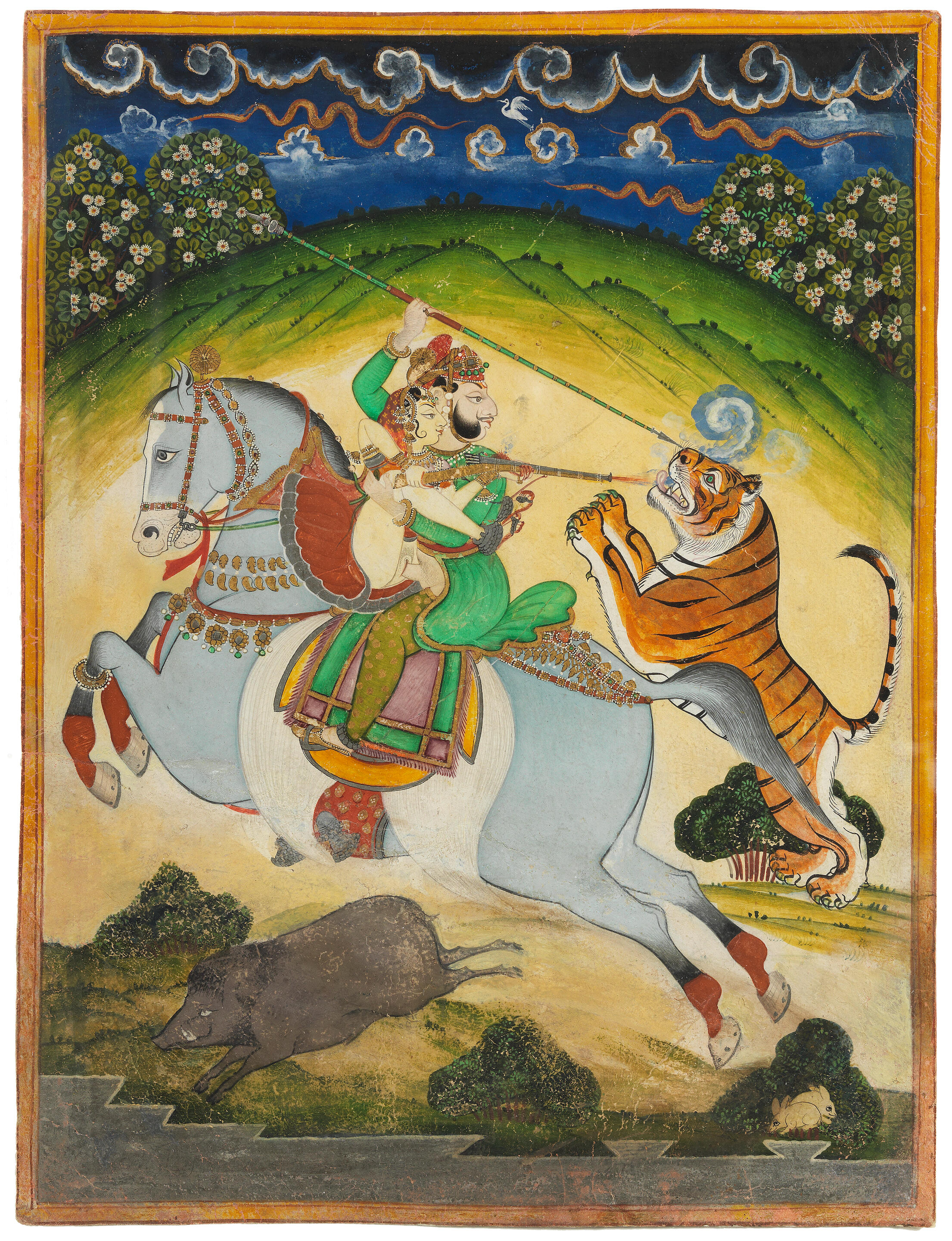
Rama Singh hunts a tiger on horseback with his mistress

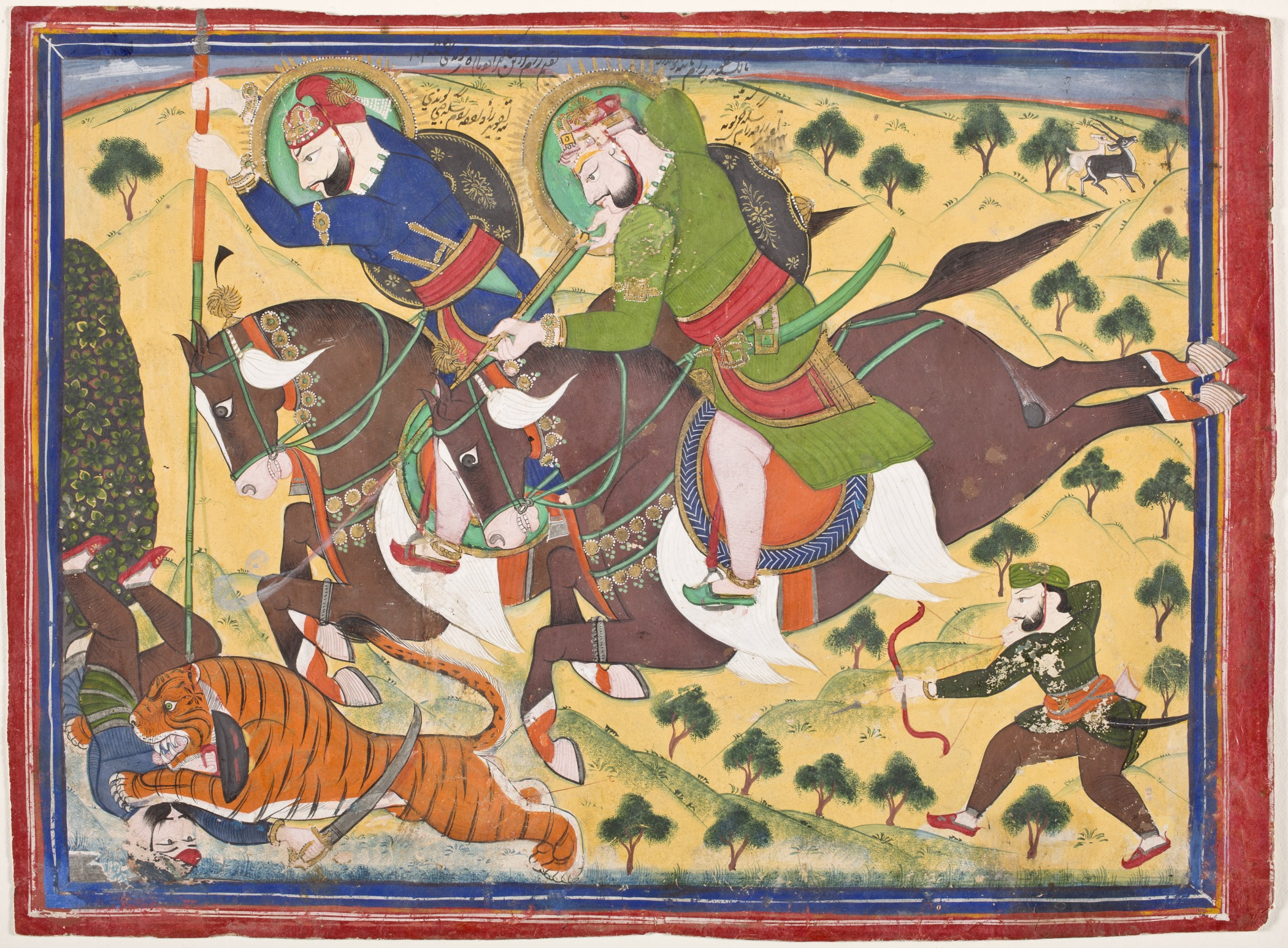
Maharao Ram Singh II of Kota (reigned 1828–1866) Hunting with Maharao Ram Singh of Bundi (reigned 1828–1866)

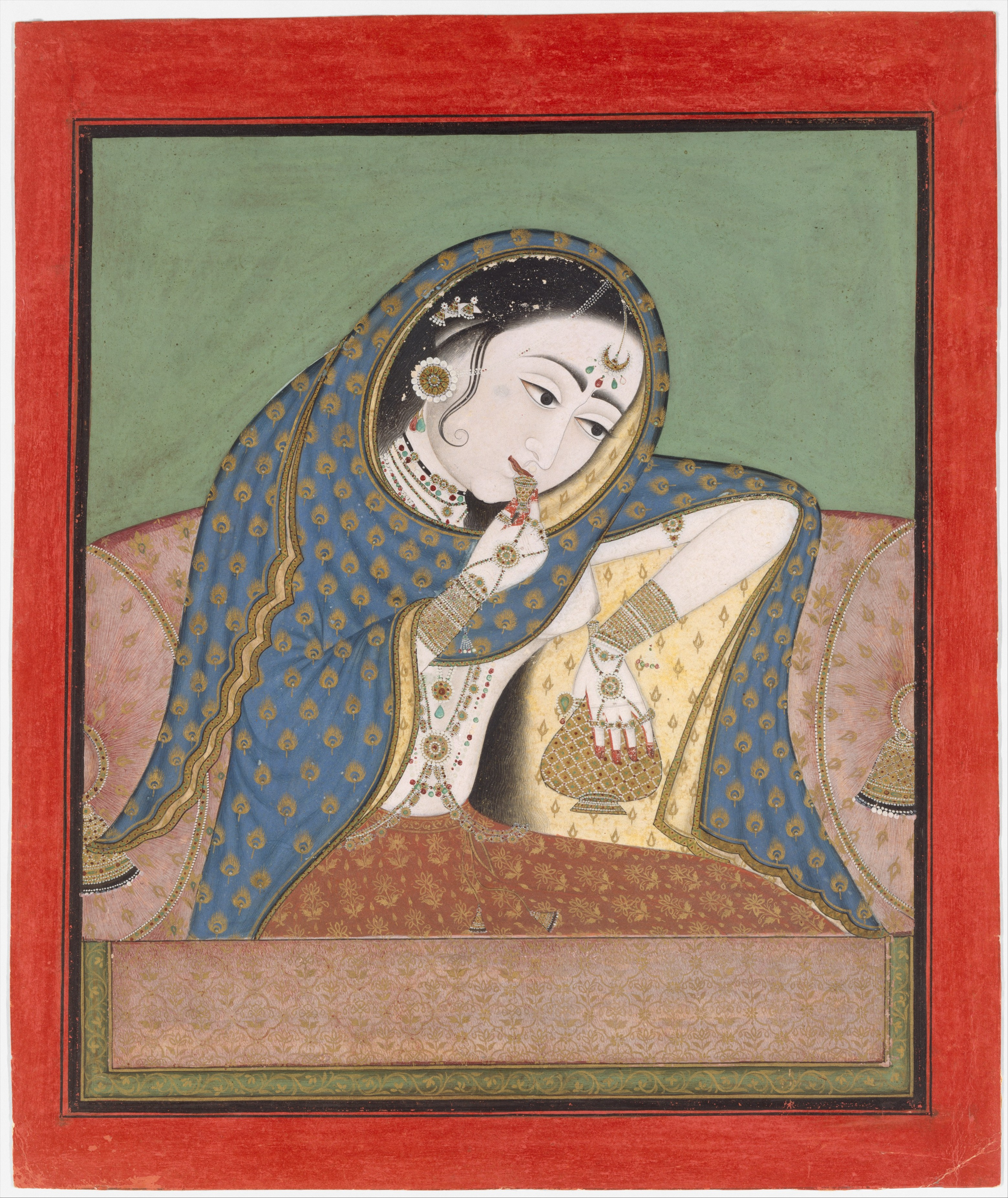
Melancholy courtesan of Kota or Bundi palace. 1610

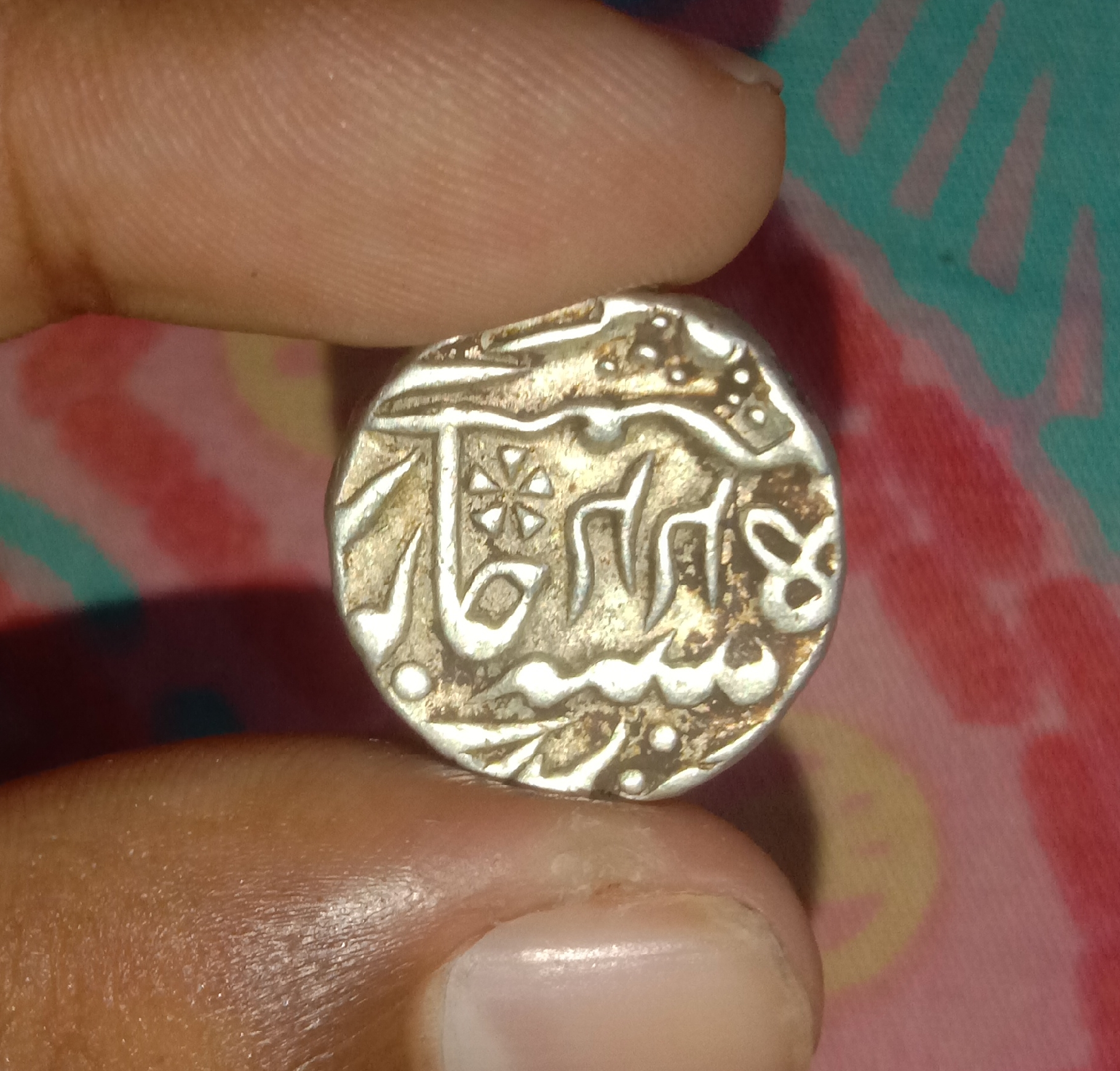
Silver Rupee from the princely state of Kotah, struck in the name of Maharaja Umaid Singh and Mughal emperor Shah Alam II
Maharaos of Kota

Maharao Durjanshal Singh, Kota

Maharao Shatrushal, Kota

Maharao Ummed Singh I, Kota

Maharao Arjun Singh Kota

Maharao Ajit Singh Kota

Maharao Madho Singh

Maharao Kishor Singh Kota

Maharao Shatrushal Kota

Maharao Durjanshal Singh Kota

Maharao Shatrushal, Kota

Maharao Ummed singh I, Kota

Maharao Arjun singh Kota

Maharao Ajit singh Kota

Maharao Madho Singh

Maharao Shatrushal Kota

== See also ==
- Garh Palace, Kota
- Hadoti
- Political integration of India
