= Samajik Nyay Manch =

Samajik Nyaya Manch समाजिक न्याय मंच
- Abbreviation: SNM
- Founder: Lokendra Singh Kalvi; Devi Singh Bhati
- Founded: 2003
- Ideology: Social justice
- Political position: Right-wing
- Regional affiliation: Rajasthan
- Seats in the Lok Sabha: 0
- Seats in the Rajya Sabha: 0
- Seats in the Rajasthan Legislative Assembly 2003: 1

Samajik Nyay Manch (SNM) (Social Justice Front) was a political party in India. Founded in 2003 by Lokendra Singh Kalvi and Devi Singh Bhati, it was established as a social-cum-political organization just before the assembly election. It was more active in Indian states Rajasthan and Haryana.

== History ==
Samajik Nyaya Manch (also written as Samajik Nyaya Manch) was founded in 2003 by Lokendra Singh Kalvi and Devi Singh Bhati as a social-cum-political organization just before the assembly election in Rajasthan. The party aimed to provide social justice to economically backward upper-caste communities in the state.

In the 2003 assembly election, the party contested 38 seats but won only one. The party's demand for reservation benefits for economically deprived Rajputs and Brahmins was later conceded by the state government and supported by the BJP-led National Democratic Alliance.

However, in 2016, the Election Commission of India canceled the recognition of 12 political parties in Rajasthan, including Samajik Nyay Manch.

== Ideology ==
Samajik Nyay Manch's ideology was centered around providing social justice to economically backward upper-caste communities in Rajasthan. The party's demand for reservation benefits for economically deprived Rajputs and Brahmins set it apart from other political parties in the state.

== Notable figures ==
- Lokendra Singh Kalvi, the national president of the Karni Sena, a Rajput community organization
- Devi Singh Bhati, an MLA and Cabinet minister
- Bhajan Lal Sharma, formerly with Samajik Nyay Manch (SNM) and a 2003 candidate for the Nadbai Assembly constituency, currently serves as the 14th Chief Minister of Rajasthan

== Electoral performance ==
In the 2003 assembly election in Rajasthan, Samajik Nyay Manch fielded 38 candidates but could only secure one seat.

Devi Singh Bhati won an assembly seat from Kolayat Assembly constituency in 2003.
