= Katariyasar =

- Village
- Interactive map of Katariyasar
- Coordinates: 28°13′02″N 73°33′48″E
- Country: India
- State: Rajasthan
- District: Bikaner district

Population (2011)
  - Total: 3,554

Katariyasar is a village in Bikaner district, Rajasthan, India. The village is inhabited by the Jasnathjis. According to the 2011 census of India, the village had a population of 3,554 people (1,849 males; 1,705 females). 6 km from Malasar village of Bikaner District

== Attractions ==
- Jasnath Temple
