= Jasnath Temple =

Temple in Rajasthan district, India

Jasnath Ji Temple
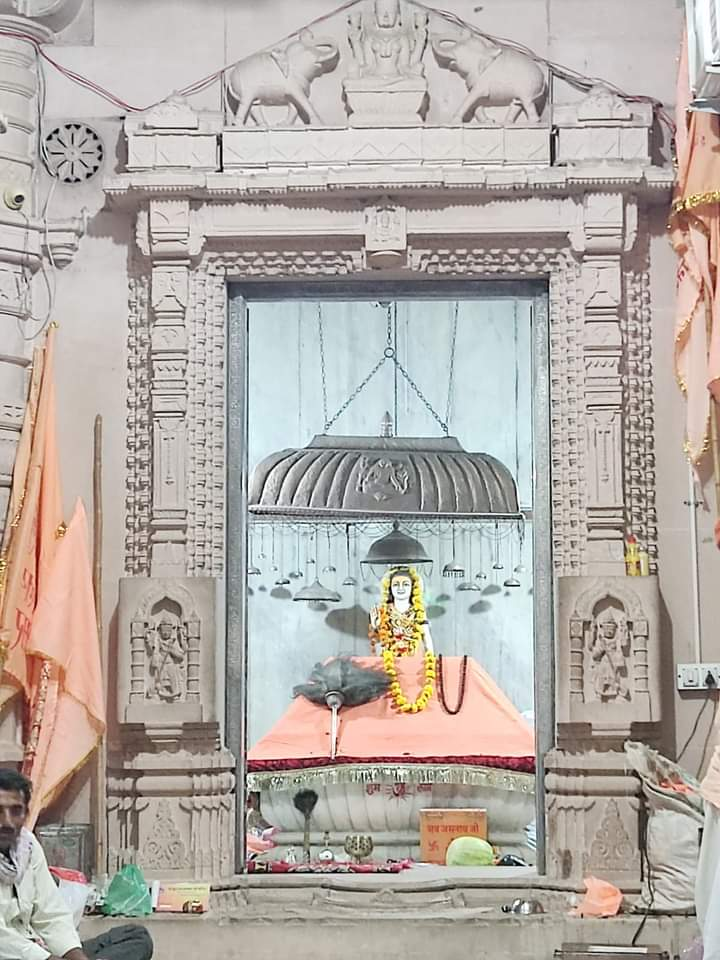
- Jasnath Ji Temple Inside View in Katariyasar, Bikaner

- Location in Rajasthan Jasnath Temple (India)

Religion
- Affiliation: Hinduism
- District: Bikaner
- Deity: Jasnath
- Festival: Saptami of Chaitra Month of every year (विक्रम संवत्)

Location
- Location: Katariyasar
- State: Rajasthan
- Country: India
- Coordinates: 28.2191253°N 73.5620354°E

Architecture
- Type: Sanatan Dharma Temple Architecture
- Creator: Jasnathi Samaj
- Completed: 2006
- Elevation: 50 m (164 ft)(Hight of Temple)

Jasnath Temple is situated in Katariyasar village in the Bikaner district of Rajasthan. It is 45 km from Junagarh Fort in Bikaner District and 6 km from Malasar village of Bikaner District.

== History ==
The temple is the main Dham (meaning: abode) of the Jasnath sect. Jasnath ji Maharaj, while taking samadhi, ordered Haroji to establish Dharmapeeth, propagating Dharma sect. It is known for the fire dance (Hindi: Agni Nritya) of the Jasnathi Siddh community.

The Jasnathi community was formally launched in Vikram Samvat 1561, after making Ramuji Saran promise to follow thirty-six religious rules. Siddhacharya Jasnathji himself completed Ramuji's formal initiation ceremony.

Siddhacharya Jasnathji's appearance occurred on the auspicious festival of Kati Sudi Ekadashi, Devuthani Gyaras Vaar, in the Brahma Muhurta on Saturday. One of the reasons for his incarnation as Siddhacharya Jasnathji is said to be that Hamirji, the ruler of Katariasar village, had done penance in Satyayugadi. In fulfilment of his boon, Jasnathji's were found as a child near the Dabhala pond in the north direction of Katariasar village. This incident can be tallied to how Kabir ji appeared on a lotus flower, after taking the form of a child, in Lahar Tara pond in Kashi. Rushi Ashtanand Ji was an eyewitness of this wonder.

According to tradition, Jasnathji displayed an immunity to heat during his childhood, remaining unharmed after sitting in a hearth containing live coals. The Jasnathi sect, founded on his teachings, maintains the tradition of fire dance, in which practitioners (Siddhas)s perform atop burning embers. The ritual continues to serve as a prominent cultural attraction for domestic and international visitors.

In Shrimad Bhagwad Gita chapter 4, verses 32 to 34, it is mentioned that for one to know the actual spiritual knowledge of that supreme God (Purn Brahm), a devotee will have to understand the tatvagyan (knowledge of the essence of life) from the Tatvadarshi saint (one who knows all the Holy Scriptures and gives true worship of God to his disciples).

Siddhacharya Jasnathji was engaged to Kalaldeji at a young age who was the daughter of Nepalji, a resident of the village of the state. Kalaldeji is considered to be the incarnation of Sati and Bhagwati.

Jasnathji took a living tomb at the young age of 24 years.

== Festivals ==
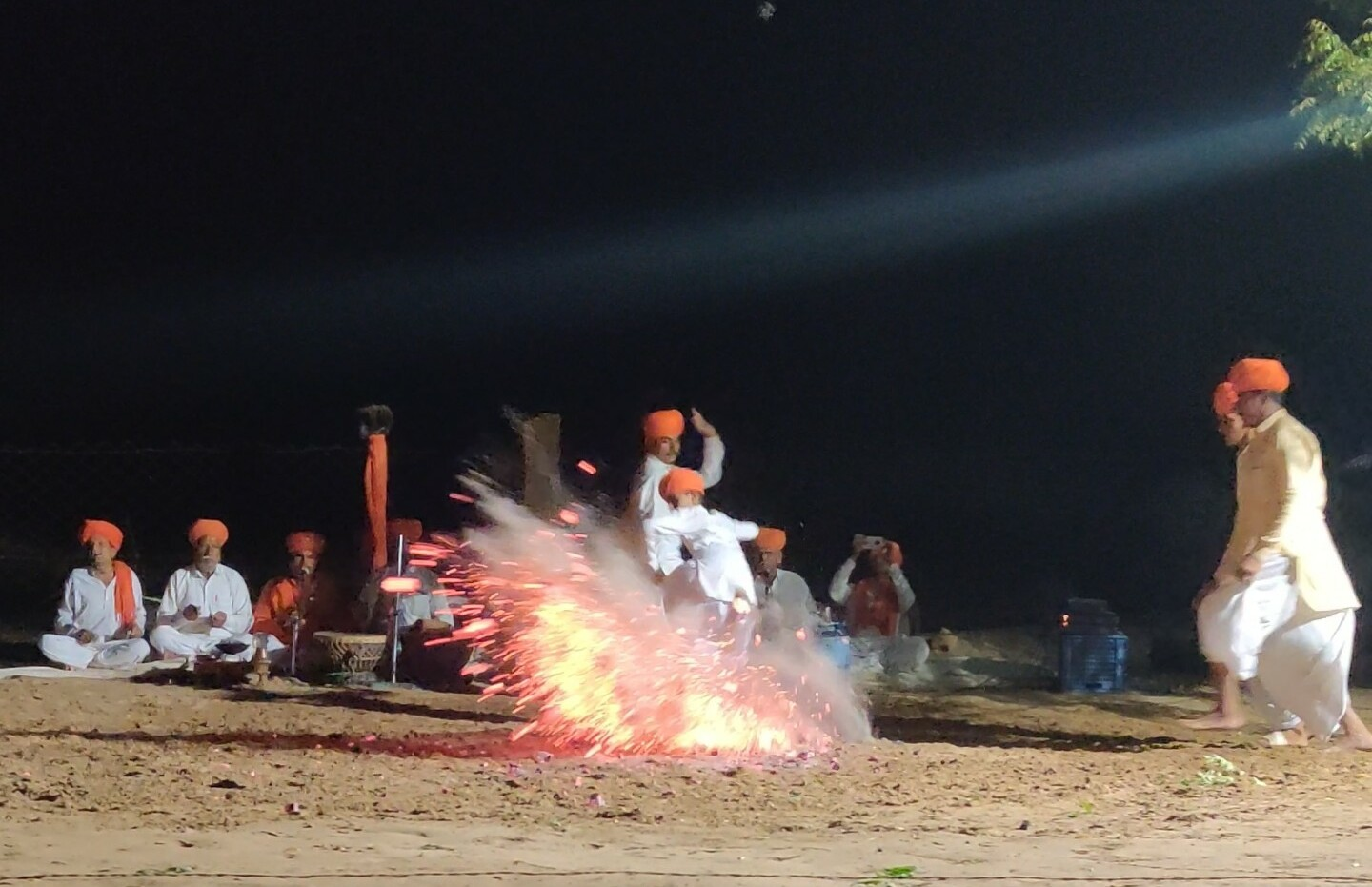
Jasnathi male performing the fire dance of Jasnath Sect

They have three main festivals -

1. Ashwin Shukla Saptami: It is celebrated on the day of Jasnath ji taking samadhi, i.e. Nirvana festival of Jasnath ji.
2. Magh Shukla Saptami: It is celebrated in memory of Jasnath ji's disciple Hansuji seeing the light appears.
3. There are two festivals in Chaitra: Sati ji's festival is celebrated on Chaitra Sudi Chauth, and Jasnath ji's festival is celebrated three days later on Saptami.

Jasnathi community (around 90% jat and 10% other castes) people come to Katariasar on Chhath to glimpse Sati mata and return to Saptami after waking up at night. Jats and other servants coming from that side stop. The festival of Saptami has celebrated there itself. In other festivals, everyone wakes up in their villages a day before. At the time of the fire dance, they sing seven hymns to the sound of drums and majors. In a way, this sect is mainly of Jats only.

== Panorama ==
In March 2024, the Rajasthan Chief Minister Bhajanlal Sharma announced a series of cultural and heritage projects, which include the construction of a panorama dedicated to Jasnath Ji in Katariyasar. The project aims to preserve and promote the heritage associated with the temple and its founder. The planned panorama is intended to serve as a cultural landmark, providing information about the life and teachings of Jasnath Ji and enhancing the temple's role as a site of tourism and pilgrimage.
