= Malasar, Jalore =

Village in the Jalore District of Rajasthan State in India

Malasar
- Village
- Country: India
- State: Rajasthan
- District: Jalore

Area
  - Total: 945.98 ha (2,337.6 acres)

Population (2011)
  - Total: 1,396
- Time zone: UTC+5:30 (IST)
- PIN: 343027
- ISO 3166 code: RJ-IN
- Vehicle registration: RJ-46

Malasar is a village in the Jalore district in Rajasthan, India. Malasar has a total population of 1396 peoples according to Census 2011. Malasar 53 km (33 mi) away from district headquarter Sanchore. Mahadev Temple is very famous where a fair is held here once a year.

== Sister city ==
Malasar is also the name of a village near Bikaner in India. This village is known for its sand dunes and sandy paths located in the Thar Desert.
