= Kalyan Singh Kalvi =

Indian politician

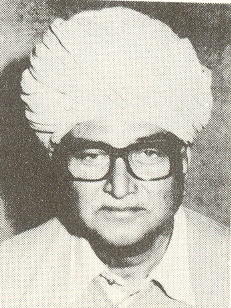

Minister of Energy
- In office 1990 - 1991
- Prime Minister: Chandra Shekhar
- Preceded by: Arif Mohammad Khan
- Succeeded by: N. K. P. Salve
- Constituency: Barmer

Member of Parliament, Lok Sabha
- In office 1989 - 1991
- Preceded by: Virdhi Chand Jain
- Succeeded by: Ram Niwas Mirdha

Personal details
- Born: 4 December 1933 (age 92) Kalvi, Nagaur, Rajasthan
- Party: Janata Dal
- Spouse: Lad Kanwar
- Children: Lokendra Singh Kalvi (Son)

Kalyan Singh Kalvi (born 4 December 1933 – died 1991) was an Indian politician belonging to the Janata Dal, known for his influence in rural Rajasthan and among the Rajput community. He served as the Minister of Energy in the Government of India from 1990 to 1991 under Prime Minister Chandra Shekhar, playing a crucial role in the formation of Shekhar’s government after the fall of the V.P. Singh administration. Kalvi was elected to the 9th Lok Sabha from the Barmer constituency in the 1989 general election and earlier held the position of Agriculture Minister in the Government of Rajasthan under Chief Minister Bhairon Singh Shekhawat. He died shortly after his tenure as a cabinet minister in 1991. His son, Lokendra Singh Kalvi, is a leader of the Rajput organisation Karni Sena.

== Biography ==
Kalvi came from the village of Kalvi in Nagaur district, Rajasthan. He was Agriculture Minister in the Government of Rajasthan during the period when Bhairon Singh Shekhawat was Chief Minister. Later, he was elected to the Ninth Lok Sabha in the general election of 1989 from Barmer Lok Sabha constituency. Kalvi was close confidant of Chandra Shekhar and played a key role in formation of Shekhar's government after the fall of the V.P. Singh government. He became a cabinet minister in 1991, holding the portfolio for Energy. He died soon after. Kalvi was a leader of the Janata Dal political party and also prominent and popular in the rural areas of Rajasthan as well as in the Rajput community.

His son, Lokendra Singh Kalvi, is a leader of the Rajput organisation Karni Sena, and has been associated with multiple political parties, including the Indian National Congress, and the Bahujan Samaj Party.
