= Jhajhoo Village =

- Village
- Location in Rajasthan, India Jhajhoo Village (India)
- Coordinates: 27.7735°N 72.9992°E
- Country: India
- State: Rajasthan
- District: Bikaner

Government
  - Body: Panchayati Raj
- Elevation: 217 m (712 ft)

Population (2011)
  - Total: 7,574

Languages
  - Official: Rajasthani, Hindi
- Time zone: UTC+5:30 (IST)
- PIN: 334302
- Vehicle registration: RJ-07
- Nearest city: Bikaner

Jhajhoo Village is a large rural village located in Kolayat Tehsil of Bikaner of Rajasthan state, India.

It is located 347 kilometres (216 mi) from Jaipur, 202 kilometres (126 mi) from Jodhpur, and 460 kilometres (286 mi) from Mount Abu.

In accordance with the Panchyati Raaj Act the village is administrated by a sarpanch (head of the village), who is elected every five years. In 2011 the population in the village was 7574, comprising 1229 households.
