= Bikaner Lok Sabha constituency =

Lok Sabha constituency in Rajasthan

Coordinates: 28.0°N 73.3°E

Bikaner RJ-2
- Lok Sabha constituency
- Interactive Map Outlining Bikaner Lok Sabha Constituency

Constituency details
- Country: India
- Region: North India
- State: Rajasthan
- Assembly constituencies: Anupgarh; Khajuwala; Bikaner West; Bikaner East; Kolayat; Lunkaransar; Dungargarh; Nokha
- Established: 1952
- Reservation: SC

Member of Parliament
- 18th Lok Sabha
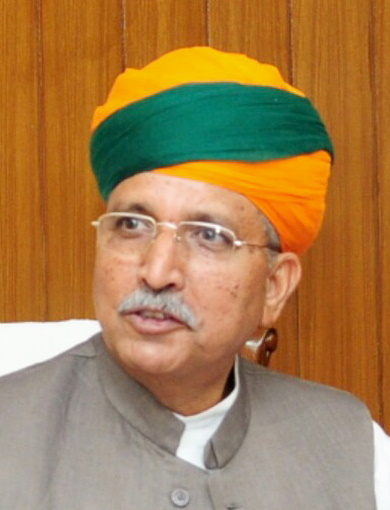
- Incumbent Arjun Ram Meghwal
- Party: Bharatiya Janata Party
- Elected year: 2024

Bikaner Lok Sabha constituency (Hindi pronunciation: [biːkaːn̪eːɾ]) is one of the 25 Lok Sabha (parliamentary) constituencies in Rajasthan state in India.

== Assembly segments ==
Presently, Bikaner Lok Sabha constituency comprises eight Vidhan Sabha (legislative assembly) segments. These are:

#	Name	District	Member	Party	2024 Lead
6	Anupgarh (SC)	Sri Ganganagar	Shimla Devi	INC	INC
12	Khajuwala (SC)	Bikaner	Vishwanath Meghwal	BJP	INC
13	Bikaner West	Bikaner	Jethanand Vyas	BJP	BJP
14	Bikaner East	Bikaner	Siddhi Kumari	BJP	BJP
15	Kolayat	Bikaner	Anshuman Singh Bhati	BJP	BJP
16	Lunkaransar	Bikaner	Sumit Godara	BJP	INC
17	Dungargarh	Bikaner	Tarachand Saraswat	BJP	INC
18	Nokha	Bikaner	Sushila Rameshwar Dudi	INC	BJP

== Members of Parliament ==
Year	Member	Party
1952	Karni Singh	Independent
1957	Karni Singh	Independent
1962	Karni Singh	Independent
1967	Karni Singh	Independent
1971	Karni Singh	Independent
1977	Chaudhary Hari Ram Godara	Janata Party
1980	Manphool Singh Chaudhary	Indian National Congress
1984	Manphool Singh Chaudhary	Indian National Congress
1989	Chaudhary Sopat Singh Godara	Communist Party of India (Marxist)
1991	Manphool Singh Chaudhary	Indian National Congress
1996	Mahendra Singh Bhati	Bharatiya Janata Party
1998	Chaudhary Balram Jakhar	Indian National Congress
1999	Chaudhary Rameshwar Lal Dudi	Indian National Congress
2004	Dharmendra Singh Deol	Bharatiya Janata Party
2009	Arjun Ram Meghwal	Bharatiya Janata Party
2014	Arjun Ram Meghwal	Bharatiya Janata Party
2019	Arjun Ram Meghwal	Bharatiya Janata Party
2024	Arjun Ram Meghwal	Bharatiya Janata Party

== Election results ==
=== 2024 ===
2024 Indian general election: Bikaner
Party	Candidate	Votes	%	±%
BJP	Arjun Ram Meghwal	566,737	50.68	▼9.14
INC	Govind Ram Meghwal	5,11,026	45.70	▲9.90
NOTA	None of the above	12,558	1.12	Steady
Majority		55,711	4.98	▼19.04
Turnout		11,19,372	54.58	▼5.79
BJP hold		Swing		

=== 2019 ===
2019 Indian general elections: Bikaner
Party	Candidate	Votes	%	±%
BJP	Arjun Ram Meghwal	657,743	59.82	▼3.02
INC	Madan Gopal Meghwal	3,93,662	35.80	▲6.06
NOTA	None of the above	13,510	1.23	▼0.22
BSP	Bhaira Ram	11,412	1.04	▼0.18
CPI(M)	Shopat Ram	8,997	0.82	N/A
Margin of victory		2,64,081	24.02	▼9.08
Turnout		11,00,500	59.43	▲1.04
BJP hold		Swing		

=== 2014 ===
2014 Indian general elections: Bikaner
Party	Candidate	Votes	%	±%
BJP	Arjun Ram Meghwal	584,932	62.84	▲19.92
INC	Shankar Pannu	2,76,853	29.74	▼9.74
NUZP	Mangilal Nayak	16,839	1.81	New
AAP	Dr. Gauri Shanker Daabi	14,148	1.52	New
BSP	Bhanwar Lal	11,387	1.22	▼5.68
Independent	Jagdish Kumar Nayak	5,164	0.55	N/A
Independent	Gopal Balmiki	4,398	0.47	N/A
BMP	Ram Ratan Meghwal	2,538	0.27	New
NOTA	None of the Above	13,492	1.45	N/A
Majority		3,08,079	33.10	▲29.66
Turnout		9,29,751	58.39	▲17.14
BJP hold		Swing	▲19.92	

=== 2009 ===
2009 Indian general elections: Bikaner
Party	Candidate	Votes	%	±%
BJP	Arjun Ram Meghwal	244,537	42.91	▼5.15
INC	Rewat Ram Panwar	2,24,962	39.48	▼3.28
BSP	Govind Ram Meghwal	39,306	6.90	▲3.31
CPI(M)	Pawan Kumar Duggal	36,555	6.41	N/A
Majority		19,575	3.44	▼1.86
Turnout		5,69,804	41.25	▼15.50
BJP hold		Swing		

=== 2004 ===
2004 Indian general elections: Bikaner
Party	Candidate	Votes	%	±%
BJP	Dharmendra Singh Deol	517,802	48.06	▲5.41
INC	Rameshwar Lal Dudi	4,60,627	42.76	▼9.99
BSP	Arjan Ram	38,729	3.59	▲1.02
Independent	Surendra Kumar Gandhi	13,281	1.23	N/A
Independent	Shyam Sunder	11,540	1.07	N/A
INLD	Dilip Singh Marwal	10,664	0.99	N/A
Independent	Saroj	7,786	0.72	N/A
Independent	Dr. Mohan Lal Sharma	5,196	0.48	N/A
Independent	Ram Lal	3,848	0.36	N/A
Lokpriya Samaj Party	Mahavir Prasad	2,818	0.26	N/A
SP	Rajendra Singh	1,998	0.19	N/A
Independent	Brij Gopal	1,762	0.16	N/A
Independent	Jasvindra Singh	1,313	0.12	N/A
Majority		57,175	5.30	▼4.80
Turnout		10,77,364	56.75	▲3.04
BJP gain from INC		Swing	▼4.69	

== See also ==
- Bikaner district
- List of constituencies of the Lok Sabha
