= Dandusar =

Village in the Bikaner District of Rajasthan State in India

- Village
- Location in Rajasthan, India Dandusar (India)
- Coordinates: 28.2636704°N 73.5122874°E
- Country: India
- State: Rajasthan
- District: Bikaner
- Tehsil: Bikaner

Government
  - Type: Panchayati Raj (India)
  - Body: Gram panchayat
  - Sarpanch: Kaushalya Devi
- Elevation: 217 m (712 ft)

Population (2011)
  - Total: 2,500

Languages
  - Official: Marwari, Hindi
- Time zone: UTC+5:30 (IST)
- PIN: 334601
- Telephone code: 01522
- Vehicle registration: RJ-07
- Nearest city: Bikaner
- Temperature: Summer: 41°C (105°F); Winter: -7°C (44°F)

Dandusar is a village located in Bikaner Tehsil of Bikaner District of Rajasthan state, India and only 3 km from Malasar village of Bikaner District.

It is located 273 kilometres (170 mi) from Jaipur. from Jodhpur, and 401 kilometres (249 mi) from New Delhi.

The village is administrated by a sarpanch (head of the village) who is elected every five years.
