= Kolayat Assembly constituency =

Constituency of the Rajasthan legislative assembly in India

Coordinates: 27.84°N 72.96°E

Kolayat
- Constituency No. 15 for the Rajasthan Legislative Assembly

Constituency details
- Country: India
- Region: North India
- State: Rajasthan
- District: Bikaner district
- Established: 1962
- Reservation: None

Member of Legislative Assembly
- 16th Rajasthan Legislative Assembly
- Incumbent Anshuman Singh Bhati
- Party: Bhartiya Janta Party

Kolayat Assembly constituency is one of constituencies of Rajasthan Legislative Assembly in the Bikaner Lok Sabha constituency.

Kolayat constituency covers all voters from Kolayat tehsil and parts of Bikaner tehsil, which include ILRC Deshnoke including Deshnoke Municipal Board.

== Members of the Legislative Assembly ==
Year	Name	Party
1962	Manik Chand Surana	Praja Socialist Party
1967	Kathuria Kanta	Indian National Congress
1972	Kathuria Kanta	Indian National Congress
1977	Ram Krishan Dass Gupta	Janata Party
1980	Devi Singh Bhati	Janata Party
1985	Devi Singh Bhati	Janata Party
1990	Devi Singh Bhati	Janata Party
1993	Devi Singh Bhati	Bharatiya Janata Party
1998	Devi Singh Bhati	Bharatiya Janata Party
2003	Devi Singh Bhati	Rajasthan Samajik Nyaya Manch
2008	Devi Singh Bhati	Bharatiya Janata Party
2013	Bhanwar Singh Bhati	Indian National Congress
2018	Bhanwar Singh Bhati	Indian National Congress
2023	Anshuman Singh Bhati	Bharatiya Janata Party

== Election results ==
=== 2023 ===
2023 Rajasthan Legislative Assembly election: Kolayat
Party	Candidate	Votes	%	±%
BJP	Anshuman Singh Bhati	101,093	50.04	+6.2
INC	Bhanwar Singh Bhati	68,160	33.74	−16.25
RLP	Revat Ram Panwar	27,854	13.79	+12.16
NOTA	None of the above	1,856	0.92	−0.94
Majority		32,933	16.3	+10.15
Turnout		202,018	78.86	+0.03
BJP gain from INC		Swing		

=== 2018 ===
2018 Rajasthan Legislative Assembly election: Kolayat
Party	Candidate	Votes	%	±%
INC	Bhanwar Singh Bhati	89,505	49.99	
BJP	Poonam Kanwar Bhati	78,489	43.84	
RLP	Dr. Suresh Kumar Bishnoi	2,915	1.63	
Independent	Hanutaram Meghwal	1,977	1.1	
NOTA	None of the above	3,332	1.86	
Majority		11,016	6.15	
Turnout		179,053	78.83	
INC gain from		Swing		

== See also ==
- Member of the Legislative Assembly (India)
