= Shimla Devi =

Indian politician (born 1982)

Member of Rajasthan Legislative Assembly
- Incumbent
- Assumed office 2023
- Preceded by: Santosh Bawri
- Constituency: Anupgarh

Personal details
- Born: 16 June 1982 (age 43) Padampur, Rajasthan
- Party: Indian National Congress
- Spouse: Omprakash Nayak (m. 2002)
- Children: 2 sons
- Parents: Ram Kumar (father); Rajadevi (mother)
- Education: Post-graduate
- Occupation: Politician
- Profession: Agriculture
- Source

Shimla Devi Nayak (born 16 June 1982) is an Indian politician from Rajasthan. She is a first-time MLA from Anupgarh Assemby constituency. She won the 2023 Rajasthan Legislative Assembly election on Indian National Congress Party ticket from Anupgarh Assembly constituency in the erstwhile Ganganagar district.

== Early life and education ==
Devi hails from Anupgarh. She did post graduation in law and is a lawyer by profession. She married Omprakash Nayak.

== Career ==
Devi won the 2023 Rajasthan Legislative Assembly election on Congress ticket from Anupgarh Assembly constituency. She defeated Santosh Bawri of BJP by a margin of 37,881 votes. In 2018 Rajasthan Legislative Assembly election, she contested as an independent candidate and finished third, behind winner Bawri of BJP and Kuldeep Indora of the Congress, who came second.
