= Jamsar =

Indian village in Bikaner District

- Village
- Location within Rajasthan Location within India
- Coordinates: 28.256°N 73.399°E
- Country: India
- State: Rajasthan
- District: Bikaner
- Elevation: 225 m (738 ft)

Population (2011 Census)
  - Total: 2,869

Languages
  - Official: Hindi, English
  - Native: Marwari, Rajasthani
- Time zone: UTC+5:30 (IST)
- PIN: 334601
- Telephone code: 01523
- Vehicle registration: RJ-07

Jamsar is a small village in Bikaner, Rajasthan, India. There were 467 households in the village in 2011. Located in a desert environment, the nearest city is Bikaner and It is 12 km from Malasar village of Bikaner District

== Geography ==
Jamsar is located at 28.25°N 73.39°E.

== Demographics ==
As of the 2011 Indian census, Jamsar had a population of 2,869. Males constitute 53% of the population and females 47%. Jamsar has an average literacy rate of 43%: male literacy is 67%, and female literacy is 33%.

== Gagainathji Samadhi ==
Baba Shri Gangainath, an 'Ayi-panthi' Nath Yogi, took ‘Samadhi’ on 31st Dec’1983 at 5:22 am at Jamsar. Shri Ramlal Ji Siyag, founder & patron of Adhyatma Vigyan Satsang Kendra, Jodhpur is the most well known disciple of Shri Gangainath Ji, whom he had handed over the title of Gurudom (gurupad). A grand program is organized at Jamsar Ashram of Baba Shri Gangainath by his disciples who gather here from all over India to pay homage and seek his blessings on this day.
