= Shimla Bawri =

Indian politician

Member of the Rajasthan Legislative Assembly
- In office 2013–2018
- Preceded by: Pawan Kumar Duggal
- Succeeded by: Santosh Bawri
- Constituency: Anupgarh

Personal details
- Party: Bharatiya Janata Party
- Occupation: Politician

Shimla Bawri is an Indian politician from Rajasthan. She won the 2013 Rajasthan Legislative Assembly Election representing Bharatiya Janata Party from the Anupgarh Vidhan Sabha constituency, a reserved constituency for SC community.

== Career ==
Bawri won the 2013 Assembly Election defeating Shimla Devi Nayak of Indian National Congress by a margin of 11,146 votes. In the 2023 Rajasthan Legislative Assembly Election, she lost as an independent candidate to Congress candidate Shimla Devi.
