= Anupgarh Assembly constituency =

Constituency of the Rajasthan legislative assembly in India

Coordinates: 29.19°N 73.21°E

Anupgarh
- Constituency No. 6 for the Rajasthan Legislative Assembly

Constituency details
- Country: India
- Region: North India
- State: Rajasthan
- Division: Bikaner
- District: Sri Ganganagar
- Lok Sabha constituency: Bikaner
- Established: 2008
- Total electors: 245,958
- Reservation: SC

Member of Legislative Assembly
- 16th Rajasthan Legislative Assembly
- Incumbent Shimla Devi
- Party: Indian National Congress
- Elected year: 2023

Anupgarh Assembly constituency is one of constituencies of Rajasthan Legislative Assembly in the Bikaner Lok Sabha constituency.

Anupgarh constituency covers all voters from Gharsana tehsil and part of Anupgarh tehsil, excluding ILRC Salempura and ILRC Banda Colony.

== Members of the Legislative Assembly ==
Year	Member	Party
2008	Pawan Kumar Duggal	Communist Party of India
2013	Shimla Bawri	Bharatiya Janata Party
2018	Santosh Bawri	Bharatiya Janata Party
2023	Shimla Devi	Indian National Congress

== Election results ==
=== 2023 ===
2023 Rajasthan Legislative Assembly election: Anupgarh
Party	Candidate	Votes	%	±%
INC	Shimla Devi Nayak	102,746	53.18	▲21.4
BJP	Santosh Bawri	64,865	33.58	▼9.72
Independent	Shimla Bawri	10,933	5.66	
CPI(M)	Shobha Singh	8,886	4.6	▼5.05
NOTA	None of the above	1,847	0.96	▼0.68
Majority		37,881	19.6	▲8.08
Turnout		193,192	78.55	▼2.74
INC gain from BJP		Swing		

=== 2018 ===
2018 Rajasthan Legislative Assembly election: Anupgarh
Party	Candidate	Votes	%	±%
BJP	Santosh	79,383	43.3	
INC	Kuldeep Indora	58,259	31.78	
Independent	Shimla Devi Nayak	21,666	11.82	
CPI(M)	Pawan Kumar Duggal	17,688	9.65	
NOTA	None of the above	3,009	1.64	
Majority		21,124	11.52	
Turnout		183,323	81.29	
BJP gain from		Swing		

== See also ==
- Member of the Legislative Assembly (India)
