= Mahendra Singh Bhati (Rajasthan politician) =

Indian politician(1968-2003)

- Bhati in 2003

Member of Parliament, Lok Sabha
- In office 1996–1998
- Preceded by: Manphool Singh Chaudhary
- Succeeded by: Balram Jakhar
- Constituency: Bikaner

Personal details
- Born: 27 July 1968
- Died: 13 December 2003 (aged 35)
- Party: Bharatiya Janata Party
- Spouse: Smt. Poonam Kanwar
- Children: Anshuman Singh Bhati
- Parent: Devi Singh Bhati (father)

Mahendra Singh Bhati (also known as Honey Banna) was a former Member of Parliament from Bikaner and the first BJP MP elected from the constituency.He was the elder son of veteran Rajasthan politician and former minister Devi Singh Bhati, and the father of Anshuman Singh Bhati.

== Political Career ==
Bhati contested the 1996 Indian general election from the Bikaner constituency on a BJP ticket. According to the official member register of the Lok Sabha, he served a single term in Parliament representing the state of Rajasthan.

== Death ==
Bhati died in a road accident in December 2003. His sudden demise was widely mourned across political lines in Rajasthan. The then Prime Minister of India, Atal Bihari Vajpayee, issued an official condolence message recognizing Bhati's extensive commitment to the welfare of economically weaker and backward classes. Annual tribute programs and blood donation camps continue to be held in Bikaner in his memory.
