= Bhanwar Singh Bhati =

Indian politician (born 1974)

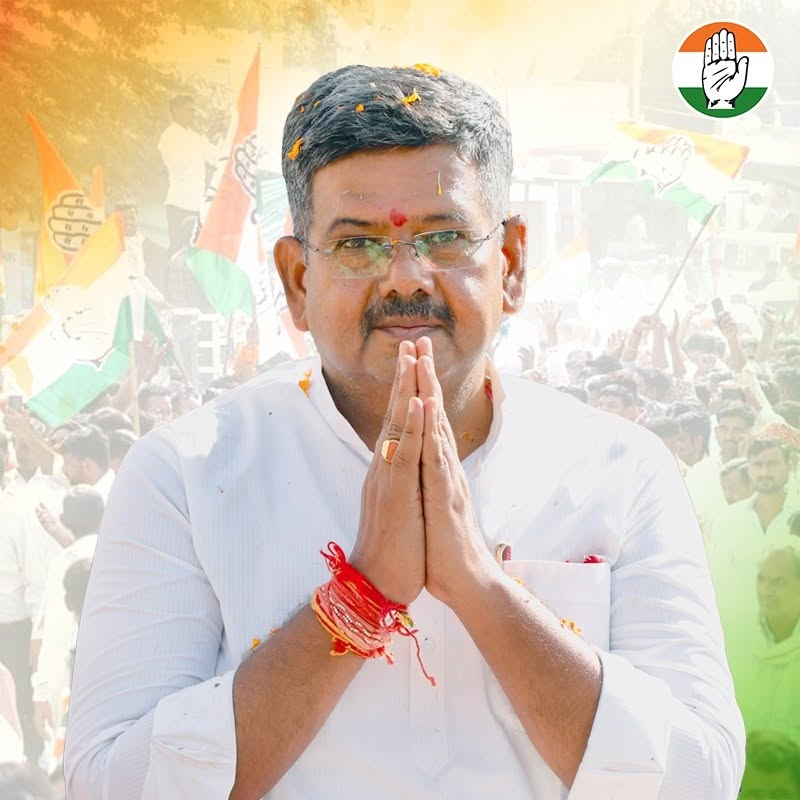
- Bhanwar Singh

Minister of State Government of Rajasthan
- In office 22 November 2021 – 3 December 2023
- Succeeded by: Suresh Singh Rawat

Minister of State for Higher education Government of Rajasthan
- In office 28 December 2018 – 21 November 2021
- Succeeded by: Rajender Singh Yadav

Member of Rajasthan Legislative Assembly
- In office 8 December 2013 – 3 December 2023
- Preceded by: Devi Singh Bhati
- Succeeded by: Anshuman Singh Bhati
- Constituency: Kolayat

Sarpanch, Gram Panchayat Hadan
- In office 2010–2013

Personal details
- Born: 1 January 1974 (age 52) Hadan, Bikaner, Rajasthan, India
- Party: Indian National Congress
- Spouse: Rajesh Kanwar (m. 2000)
- Children: 2
- Parent: Sh. Rughnath Singh Bhati (father)
- Education: Graduate (B.A.) in 1998
- Alma mater: IGNOU, Delhi New Delhi
- Occupation: Agriculture, Transporter

Bhanwar Singh Bhati (born 1 January 1974) is Indian politician who is former Minister of State for Power (Independent Charge), IGNP, Water Resource Department, Government of Rajasthan. As member of the Indian National Congress party, he has represented the Kolayat assembly seat of Rajasthan since 2013.

== Family and education ==
Bhanwar Singh Bhati was born in Hadan village of Bikaner district in Rajasthan. He is a Rajput by caste. He is the son of Rughnath Singh Bhati.

== Political career ==
In the 2013 Legislative Assembly elections, Bhati won from the Kolayat seat.
