= Virdhi Chand Jain =

Indian politician (1920–2010)

Member of Parliament
- In office 1980-1984 Seventh Lok Sabha; 1984-1989 Eighth Lok Sabha
- Preceded by: Tan Singh
- Succeeded by: Kalyan Singh Kalvi
- Constituency: Barmer-Jaisalmer

Personal details
- Born: 4 July 1920 Barmer, Rajasthan
- Died: 13 January 2010 (aged 89)
- Party: Indian National Congress
- Spouse: Late Smt. Mooli Devi
- Relations: 9 grandchildren
- Children: Late Shri Shankar Lal Jain; Shri Mohan Lal Jain; Shri Sooraj Mal Jain
- Education: B.Com., LL.B.

Virdhi Chand Jain (1920-2010) was an Indian freedom fighter, parliamentarian and lawyer. He served as a Member of Parliament for two terms in the Seventh & Eighth Lok Sabha, representing the Barmer constituency in Rajasthan from 1980 to 1984, and 1984 to 1989. He was a Member of Legislative Assembly for three terms for the Barmer constituency from Rajasthan from 1972 to 1977, 1977 to 1980, and 1998 to 2003. During his tenure, he served on the Committee on Absence of Members from the Sittings of the House (1980), the Joint Committee on Offices of Profit (1981–1984), and the Joint Committee on Salaries and Allowances of Members of Parliament (1982–1984). He was a party member of Indian National Congress.

Subhas Chandra Bose founded the Forward Bloc on May 3, 1939 and Jain joined the Forward Bloc in 1939. He later joined the Marwar Lok Parishad (1946–1949). In 1949, he became a member of the Indian National Congress. A practicing advocate by profession, he also held several positions in local self-government and public service. He served as a member of the Barmer Municipal Council (Nagarpalika) from 1950 to 1953 and was elected Pramukh of the Barmer Zila Parishad twice, serving from October 1959 to February 1964.

He was actively associated with social welfare organizations in Barmer, serving as President of the Bharat Sewak Samaj, Barmer District, and of the Bharat Sewak Samaj Homoeopathy Hospital for over two decades. He also served as President of the Barmer Zila Nashabandi Mandal.

== Personal ==
Late Shri Virdhi Chand Jain also known as Vridhi Chand Jain, son of Shri Rawat Mal Jain, was born on 4 July 1920 in a Bohra Jain family at Chohtan, Barmer, Rajasthan. A Commerce and Law graduate, studied at Sanatan Dharma College, Kanpur, Uttar Pradesh. He was married to Late Smt. Mooli Devi and has three sons, and 9 grandchildren. Late Shri Virdhi Chand Jain was Bohra - Jain by religion and was a member of the Indian National Congress (INC) party.

== Member of Parliament ==
| Lok Sabha | Duration | Name of M.P. | Party affiliation |
|---|---|---|---|
| Seventh | 1980-1984 | Virdhi Chand Jain | Indian National Congress |
| Eighth | 1984-1989 | Virdhi Chand Jain | Indian National Congress |

== MLA/Member of Barmer assembly constituency ==
| Vidhan Sabha | Duration | Name of M.L.A. | Party affiliation |
|---|---|---|---|
| [1998 Vidhan Sabha] | 1998-2003 | Virdhi Chand Jain | Indian National Congress |
| [1977 Vidhan Sabha] | 1977-1980 | Virdhi Chand Jain | Indian National Congress |
| [1972 Vidhan Sabha] | 1972-1977 | Virdhi Chand Jain | Indian National Congress |

== Social activities ==
Fought for the cause of the downtrodden, oppressed and eradication of dacoit menace; pleaded the cause of agriculturists in eradicating "Begar" and Lag Bag and introducing "Baghori" (cash rent) in Barmer District of Rajasthan.
