= Arjun Ram Meghwal =

Indian politician (born 1953)

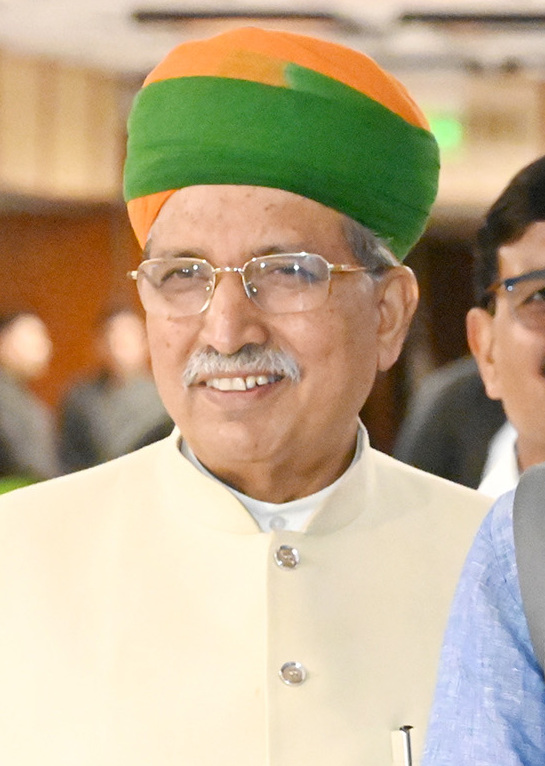
- Meghwal in 2024

34th Union Minister of State (Independent Charge) for Law and Justice
- Incumbent
- Assumed office 18 May 2023
- Prime Minister: Narendra Modi
- Preceded by: Kiren Rijiju (Note: as Minister)

Union Minister of State for Parliamentary Affairs
- Incumbent
- Assumed office 3 September 2017 Serving with V. Muraleedharan (2019-2024) and L. Murugan (2024-2026)
- Minister: Ananth Kumar; Narendra Singh Tomar; Pralhad Joshi; Kiren Rijiju
- Preceded by: Vijay Goel

Union Minister of State for Heavy Industries and Public Enterprises
- In office 30 May 2019 – 7 July 2021
- Minister: Prakash Javadekar

Union Minister of State for Finance & Corporate Affairs
- In office 5 July 2016 – 3 September 2017
- Prime Minister: Narendra Modi
- Minister: Arun Jaitley

Union Minister of State for Water Resources
- In office 5 July 2016 – 3 September 2017
- Prime Minister: Narendra Modi
- Minister: Uma Bharti

Member of Parliament, Lok Sabha
- Incumbent
- Assumed office 16 May 2009
- Preceded by: Dharmendra
- Constituency: Bikaner, Rajasthan

Union Minister of State for Culture
- In office 7 July 2021 – 10 June 2024 Serving with Meenakshi Lekhi
- Preceded by: Kanti Singh
- Succeeded by: Rao Inderjit Singh

Personal details
- Born: 20 December 1953 (age 72) Bikaner, Rajasthan, India
- Spouse: Pana Devi (m. 1968)
- Children: 4
- Parents: Lakhu Ram Meghwal (father); Hira Devi Meghwal (mother)
- Education: MA, LLB, MBA
- Alma mater: Dungar College, Bikaner; University of the Philippines
- Occupation: Civil servant
- Website: arjunrammeghwal.com

Arjun Ram Meghwal (born 20 December 1953; Hindi pronunciation: [əɾ.d͡ʒʊn̪ ɾaːm meːgʱ.ʋaːl]) is an Indian politician and former bureaucrat who is serving as the 34th Minister of Law and Justice since 2024.

A member of the Bharatiya Janata Party, Meghwal was IAS officer of 1999 Rajasthan Cadre, he served at various administrative posts. However, he took VRS in 2009 and joined active politics by joining Bharatiya Janata Party & was elected as Member of Lok Sabha from Bikaner (SC) in same year. He was formerly served as Chief Whip, minister of State for Heavy Industries and Public Enterprises from 2019 to 2021, minister of State for Finance and Corporate Affairs from 2016 to 2017 and minister of State for Water Resources from 2016 to 2017. He is also a member of Lok Sabha since 2009 representing the Bikaner constituency, Rajasthan. He was awarded the Best Parliamentarian in 2013.

== Early life and education ==
He was born Meghwal Caste to Lakhu Ram Meghwal and Hira Devi in the small village of Kishmidesar in Bikaner, Rajasthan. He is a Master of Arts in Political Science, and LLB from Dungar College in Bikaner, Rajasthan and MBA from University of the Philippines in the Philippines.

After completing graduation in Law in the year 1977, he completed post-graduation in Arts in the year 1979 as a regular student. He applauds the fact that he climbed the ladder from the crust, starting as a telephone operator during his studies around 1974 in the Post and Telegraph Department, to entering the Rajasthan Administrative Services in 1980, and later being promoted to the Indian Administrative Service.

== Political life ==
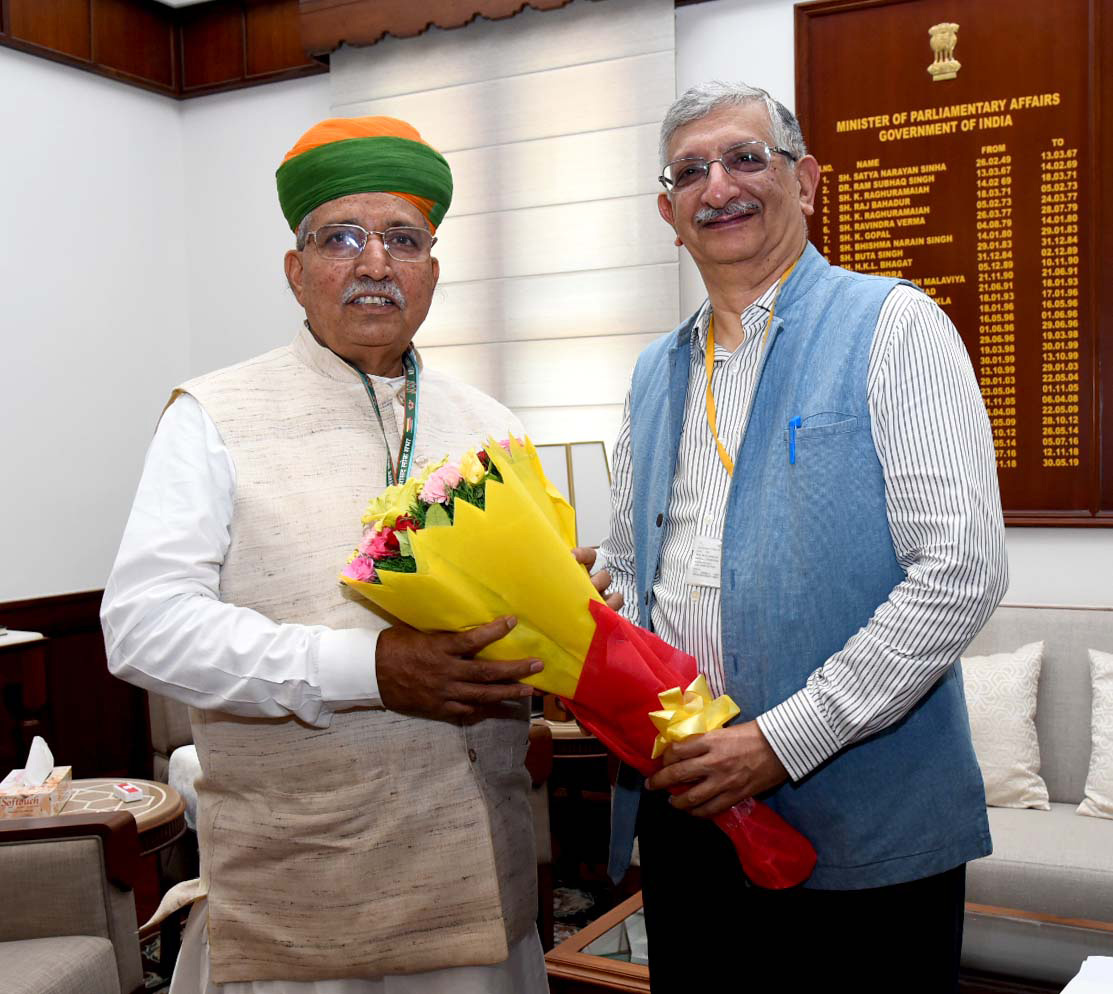
Meghwal assuming charge as Minister of State (Independent Charge) for Parliamentary Affairs

In 2009, he was elected as a Member of Parliament representing the Bhartiya Janata Party from Bikaner constituency.

In the general election of 2014, he was re-elected from the Bikaner constituency for the 16th Lok Sabha. He was Chief Whip of Bhartiya Janta Party in the Lok Sabha and Chairman of the House Committee. After being transferred four times in a row within four months, he was prompted to opt for voluntary retirement and enter the politics. In his word, he said: "I would see my name in every transfer list and precisely was transferred four times in four months, which led to this decision."

In May 2019, Meghwal became Minister of State for Parliamentary Affairs and Heavy Industries and Public Enterprises.

== Personal life ==
He is married to Pana Devi with whom he has two sons and two daughters. He is a good player of badminton and was a bureaucrat by profession, an IAS Officer in Rajasthan. His cousin Madan Gopal Meghwal is also a politician from Indian National Congress.

== See also ==
- Third Modi ministry

== Notes ==
Lok Sabha
Preceded by Dharmendra	Member of Parliament for Bikaner; 2009 – Present	Incumbent
Political offices
Preceded by Kiren Rijiju	Minister of Law and Justice; MOS with I/C; 18 May 2023 - Present	Incumbent
