= Devi Singh Bhati =

Indian politician

Cabinet minister Government of Rajasthan
- In office December 2003 – December 2008

Member of the Rajasthan Legislative Assembly
- In office 1980 - 2013
- Preceded by: Ram Krishan Dass Gupta
- Succeeded by: Bhanwar Singh Bhati
- Constituency: Kolayat

Personal details
- Born: 31 May 1946 (age 80) Kolayat, Bikaner, Rajasthan
- Party: Bharatiya Janata Party
- Relations: Anshuman Singh Bhati (grand-son)
- Children: Mahendra Singh Bhati

Devi Singh Bhati is an Indian politician. He is former seven term member of the Rajasthan Legislative Assembly from Kolayat from 1980 to 2013. He was a cabinet minister in the Government of Rajasthan. He is a member of the Bharatiya Janata Party.
