= Lunkaransar Assembly constituency =

Constituency of the Rajasthan legislative assembly in India

Coordinates: 28.49°N 73.75°E

Lunkaransar
- Constituency No. 16 for the Rajasthan Legislative Assembly

Constituency details
- Country: India
- Region: North India
- State: Rajasthan
- District: Bikaner district
- Established: 1957
- Reservation: None

Member of Legislative Assembly
- 16th Rajasthan Legislative Assembly
- Incumbent Sumit Godara
- Party: Bharatiya Janata Party
- Elected year: 2023

Lunkaransar Assembly constituency is one of constituencies of Rajasthan Legislative Assembly in the Bikaner Lok Sabha constituency.

Lunkaransar constituency covers all voters from Lunkaransar tehsil and parts of Bikaner tehsil, which include ILRC Jamsar, ILRC Napasar and Ridmalsar Purohitan of ILRC Bikaner.

== Members of the Legislative Assembly ==
Year	Member	Party
1957	Bhim Sain Choudhary	Indian National Congress
1962	Bhim Sain Choudhary	Indian National Congress
1967	Bhim Sain Choudhary	Indian National Congress
1972	Bhim Sain Choudhary	Indian National Congress
1977	Manik Chand Surana	Janata Party
1980	Malu Ram Legha	Indian National Congress
1985	Manik Chand Surana	Janata Party
1990	Mani Ram Siyag	Janata Party
1993	Bhim Sain Choudhary	Indian National Congress
1998	Bhim Sain Choudhary	Indian National Congress
2000^	Manik Chand Surana	Bharatiya Janata Party
2003	Virendra Beniwal	Indian National Congress
2008	Virendra Beniwal	Indian National Congress
2013	Manik Chand Surana	Independent
2018	Sumit Godara	Bharatiya Janata Party
2023	Sumit Godara	Bharatiya Janata Party

== Election results ==
=== 2023 ===
2023 Rajasthan Legislative Assembly election: Lunkaransar
Party	Candidate	Votes	%	±%
BJP	Sumit Godara	60,452	29.99	−12.13
INC	Rajendra Moond	51,583	25.59	−10.25
Independent	Prabhudayal Sarswat	45,379	22.51	
Independent	Virendra Beniwal	29,895	14.83	
RLP	Shivdan Ram	3,170	1.57	+0.23
ASP	Phusaram	2,494	1.24	
Independent	Shyam Sunder	2,383	1.18	
NOTA	None of the above	1,613	0.8	−0.4
Majority		8,869	4.4	−1.88
Turnout		201,592	77.27	+0.48
BJP hold		Swing		

=== 2018 ===
2018 Rajasthan Legislative Assembly election: Lunkaransar
Party	Candidate	Votes	%	±%
BJP	Sumit Godara	72,822	42.12	
INC	Virendra Beniwal	61,969	35.84	
Independent	Prabhudayal	23,892	13.82	
BSP	Pawan Kumar Ojha	2,720	1.57	
CPI(M)	Lalchand Bhadu	2,600	1.5	
RLP	Vijaypal Beniwal	2,321	1.34	
NOTA	None of the above	2,075	1.2	
Majority		10,853	6.28	
Turnout		172,895	76.79	
BJP gain from		Swing		

== See also ==
- Member of the Legislative Assembly (India)
