= Manphool Singh Chaudhary =

Indian politician (1927–2008)

Member of Parliament, Lok Sabha
- In office 1980–1989
- Preceded by: Hari Ram Makkasar Godara Chaudhry
- Succeeded by: Sopat Singh Makkasar
- In office 1991–1996
- Preceded by: Sopat Singh Makkasar
- Succeeded by: Mahendra Singh Bhati
- Constituency: Bikaner, Rajasthan.

Personal details
- Born: 11 November 1927
- Died: 20 February 2008 (aged 80)
- Party: Indian National Congress
- Spouse: Kaushalya Devi

Manphool Singh Bhadu (11 November 1927 – 20 February 2008) was an Indian politician. He was elected to the Lok Sabha, the lower house of the Parliament of India from Bikaner, Rajasthan, as a member of the Indian National Congress.

Chaudhary died on 9 January 2008, at the age of 80.
