= Tan Singh =

Indian politician

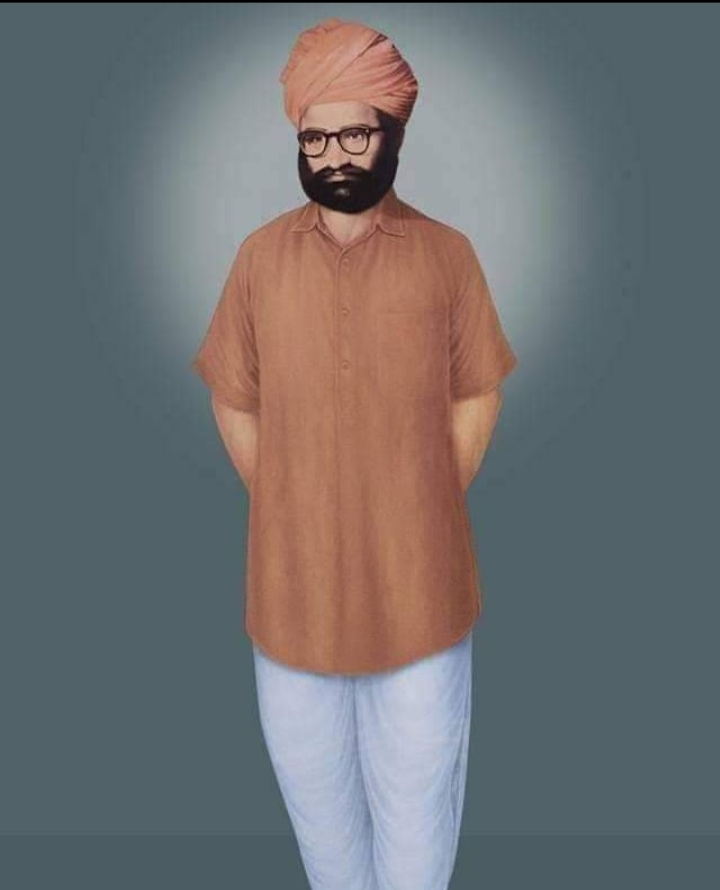

Member of Parliament
- In office 1977 - 1980
- Preceded by: Raghunath Singh Bahadur
- Succeeded by: Amrit Nahata
- In office 1962 - 1967
- Preceded by: Amrit Nahata
- Succeeded by: Virdhi Chand Jain

Personal details
- Born: 25 January 1924 Barmer, Rajasthan
- Died: 7 December 1979 (aged 55)
- Party: Janata Party
- Spouse: Bai Raj Kanwar

Pujya Tan Singh Ji (25 January 1924 – 7 December 1979) was an Indian politician who served as the member of the Lok Sabha, the lower house of the parliament for two terms. He founded Shri Kshatriya Yuvak Sangh, an organisation for young Rajputs. Previously he was a Member of the Legislative Assembly of Rajasthan state.

== Early life ==
Tan Singh ji was born on 25 January 1924 in Nanihal Bairsiala (Jaisalmer). Taneraj was his childhood name. His father's name was Thakur Balwant Singh Mahecha and his mother's name was Mrs. Moti Kanwar Sodha. His father died only 4 years after his birth. He was married to Smt Bairaj Kanwar.

== Political career ==
After becoming a lawyer, Tan Singh came to Barmer again and he started advocating here. In the year 1949, he was appointed as the first chairman of Barmer Municipality. In the 1952 elections, Tan Singh was elected to the first Legislative Assembly of Rajasthan from Barmer.

He was re-elected as an MLA in the year 1957. In 1962, Barmer got only Rs 9000 from Jaisalmer’s largest constituency. MPs were elected by spending. Lost the 1967 election, then started his own business and also provided employment to many of his colleagues. Re-elected MP in the year 1977.

Tan Singh also joined the movement against the ban on Rashtriya Swayamsevak Sangh after Gandhiji’s assassination in the year 1948 and also got voluntary arrest.

== Social work ==
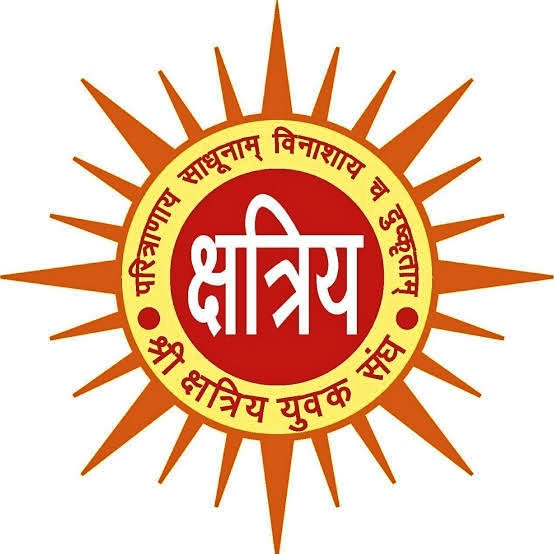
Logo of Shri Kshtriya Yuvak Sangh

Tansingh ji became very sensitive about the condition and direction of the society. Seeing the deteriorating direction of the society, he became very worried and he collected such people who want to work for the society. On the night of Diwali of 1946, he laid the foundation of an organization called Shri Kshatriya Yuvak Sangh, which became a milestone for Rajput society.

== Death ==
He died on 7 December 1979.
