= Anshuman Singh Bhati =

Indian politician

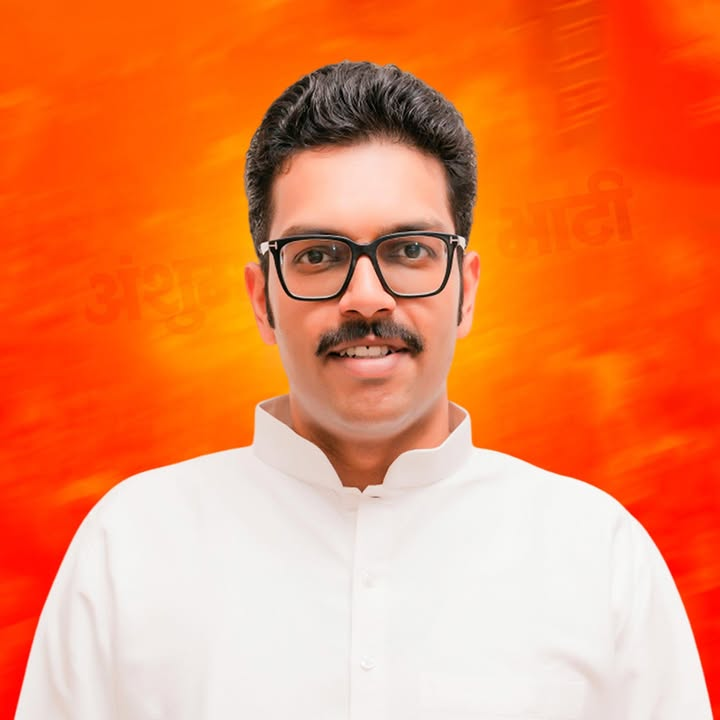
- Anshuman Singh Bhati

Member of the Rajasthan Legislative Assembly
- Incumbent
- Assumed office December 2023
- Preceded by: Bhanwar Singh Bhati
- Constituency: Kolayat

Personal details
- Party: Bhartiya Janta Party
- Parents: Mahendra Singh Bhati (father); Smt. Poonam Kanwar (mother)
- Relatives: Devi Singh Bhati(grandfather)
- Occupation: Politician

Anshuman Singh Bhati is an Indian politician currently serving as a member of 16th Rajasthan Legislative Assembly, representing the Kolayat Assembly constituency. He is a member of the Bhartiya Janta Party.He is a third-generation member of the Bhati family of Bikaner and grandson of Devi Singh Bhati, former minister of Rajasthan.

== Political career ==
Following the 2023 Rajasthan Legislative Assembly election, he was elected as an MLA from the Kolayat Assembly constituency, defeating Bhanwar Singh Bhati, the candidate from the Indian National Congress (INC), by a margin of 32,933 votes. He attained the distinction of becoming youngest MLA in the 2023 Rajasthan Legislative Assembly elections in 2023.
