= Sumit Godara =

Indian politician (born 1973)

Cabinet Minister, Government of Rajasthan
- Incumbent
- Assumed office 30 December 2023
- Governor: Kalraj Mishra; Haribhau Bagade
- Chief Minister: Bhajan Lal Sharma
- Ministry and Departments: List: Food & Civil Supplies; Consumer Affairs
- Preceded by: Pratap Singh Khachariyawas

Member of the Rajasthan Legislative Assembly
- Incumbent
- Assumed office 2018
- Preceded by: Manik Chand Surana
- Constituency: Lunkaransar

Personal details
- Born: 11 December 1973 (age 51); Malasar, Rajasthan, India
- Political party: Bharatiya Janata Party
- Spouse: Shanta Chaudhary
- Occupation: Politician

Sumit Godara (born 11 December 1973) is an Indian politician and a Cabinet Minister in the Government of Rajasthan, handling the portfolios of Food & Civil Supplies and Consumer Affairs. A member of the Bharatiya Janata Party, he represents the Lunkaransar Assembly constituency in the Rajasthan Legislative Assembly. He has served as an MLA in 15th and 16th Legislative Assemblies.

== Early life and education ==
Sumit Godara was born on 11 December 1973 in Malasar, Rajasthan.

== Political career ==
In the 2018 Rajasthan Legislative Assembly election, Sumit Godara was elected to the 15th Rajasthan Assembly from the Lunkaransar constituency as a candidate of the Bharatiya Janata Party.

In the 2023 Rajasthan Legislative Assembly election, he was re-elected from the same constituency. He defeated Indian National Congress candidate Rajendra Moond, securing 60,452 votes.

Following the election, he was inducted into the Bhajan Lal Sharma ministry as Cabinet Minister for Food & Civil Supplies and Consumer Affairs.

== Electoral record ==
Election results
Year	Office	Constituency	Party	Votes (Sumit Godara)	%	Opponent	Opponent Party	Votes	%	Result	Ref
2023	MLA	Lunkaransar	Bharatiya Janata Party	60,452	29.99	Rajendra Moond	Indian National Congress	51,583	25.59	Won	
2018	MLA	Lunkaransar	Bharatiya Janata Party	72,822	42.12	Virendra Beniwal	Indian National Congress	61,969	35.84	Won	
2013	MLA	Lunkaransar	Bharatiya Janata Party	47,715	32.15	Manik Chand Surana	IND	52,532	35.40	Lost	
