= Kolayat Lake =

Lake in India

Coordinates: 27.841°N 72.955°E

- Location: Near the town of Kolayat, Bikaner district, Rajasthan, India

Kolayat Lake is located near the town of Kolayat, Bikaner district, Rajasthan, India. The lake was created by Kapila Muni for the liberation of his mother. It is a pilgrimage destination linked to Kapi and thought to be named after him. The sacred waters of Kolayat lake are believed to wash away sins. Kapil Muni's ashram situated near the lake is called 'Beautiful Desert of Rajasthan'. This ashram is located on National Highway 15.
