= Karni Sena =

Organisation based in Rajasthan, India

Shree Rajput Karni Sena
- Named after: Karni Mata
- Formation: September 23, 2006; 20 years ago
- Founder: Lokendra Singh Kalvi
- Founded at: Jaipur, Rajasthan
- Type: Nonprofit
- Headquarters: Jaipur, Rajasthan
- Leader: Dr Raj Shekhawat

Karni Sena (/ˈkəˈrni seɪnɑː/; Karaṇī sēnā), is an organization based in Rajasthan, India. It was founded by Lokendra Singh Kalvi in Jaipur, Rajasthan. The organization is currently headed by Dr Raj Shekhawat

== History ==
The origin of the Karni Sena can be traced to attempts by the Rajput leader Lokendra Singh Kalvi to mobilise the Rajput community in 2005. The organisation was formed in on 23 September 2006 in Jhotwara locality of Jaipur, primarily by Rajput youth. The central aim of the newly-formed organisation was to demand caste-based reservation for Rajputs in government jobs and education. Its other objectives included ending the alleged "sidelining of Rajput figures in textbooks" and help elect Rajput legislators in the government.

The first president of the organisation was Ajeet Singh Mamdoli. During the 2008 Rajasthan Assembly elections, the group supported the Indian National Congress on the condition that the party would give a specified number of tickets to Rajput candidates. At that time, Kalvi was associated with the Congress, and Mamdoli wanted a Congress ticket to contest the election. According to Mamdoli, Kalvi was concerned about his growing political clout, which led to differences between the two leaders, and a split in the group. Mamdoli left the group and formed a new faction. Mamdoli filed a case against Kalvi's group, claiming that he had registered the name "Shri Rajput Karni Sena"; as of 2018, the case is sub-judice.

After Mamdoli's departure, Kalvi appointed Mahipal Singh Makrana as the President of his faction. After that Lokendra Singh Kalvi Appointed Sukhdev Singh Gogamedi as replaced in Mahipal Singh Makrana as President, Later, differences developed between Kalvi and Gogamedhi over demands for reservation. In 2015, Gogamedi was expelled over criminal charges, and formed his own faction, called "Shree Rashtriya Rajput Karni Sena." Kalvi then appointed Again Mahipal Singh Makrana as the President of his faction.

As on date there are few major Karni Sena factions:

- Shree Rajput Karni Sena, Founded by Lokendra Singh Kalvi
- Shree Rashtriya Rajput Karni Sena, Founded by Sukhdev Singh Gogamedi
- Kshatriya Karni Sena, Founded by Dr Raj Shekhawat

The Karni Sena members initially focused on the caste-based reservation issue, but later, they became involved in a number of political issues in order to gain limelight. In 2008, they protested against the release of the movie Jodhaa Akbar, alleging that it distorted Rajput history. In 2012, Karni Sena members from Shekhawati protested against a CBI inquiry against the Bharatiya Janata Party (BJP) legislator Rajendra Singh Rathore.

In 2017, the Sena's members organised protests against the police encounter killing of gangster Anand Pal Singh, whom they saw as a defender of Rajputs. Kalvi's faction sidelined the other factions during these protests, and became prominent. Also in 2017, the group came to national limelight when it protested against the release of the movie Padmaavat.

=== Jodhaa Akbar ===
SRKS had protested when the film Jodhaa Akbar was released in 2008. According to Goldie Osuri, an academic with specialist interests in depictions of nationalism in the media, the public objection of the SRKS was related to a "minor historical indeterminacy" regarding whether the fictional central character was the wife or daughter-in-law of the Mughal emperor Akbar. Osuri says that a wider analysis of media and blog sources shows that the real objection was to the depiction of marriage between the Muslim Emperor Akbar and a Hindu Rajput princess.

The SRKS did not receive an apology from the Jodhaa Akbar film-maker, Ashutosh Gowariker, as they had demanded but some Rajasthani cinemas did refuse to show the production and there were some protests in other states also. The organisation then objected to the 2010 movie Veer, which they claimed maligned their community. They vandalised some cinemas that showed the film, the acts being described by commentator Chitra Padmanabhan as:

Thereupon the Sena wrote a new chapter in bravery by indulging in acts of vandalism in theatres screening the movie. Clearly, the 'art' lies in feeling aggrieved all the time.

In 2013, SRKS announced their opposition to the similarly-titled and -themed Jodhaa Akbar historical drama television series. Various objectors associated with SRKS said that the group would organise legal action and public protests to ban the series from being broadcast if discussions with the television company, Zee TV, did not achieve their aim. They claimed that the Hindu-Muslim marriage involved a fictional character and was a distortion of history resulting from poor research. In 2014, SRKS organised a protest against Ekta Kapoor, who had produced the now-broadcast series. A month later, it was alleged that a group of around 40 SRKS members attacked the offices of Zee Media in Jaipur, a part of the television company that had broadcast the series. Journalists' trade unions demanded that the police should react by arresting Lokendra Singh Kalvi, the SRKS leader.

=== Padmavati ===
In 2017, the Karni Sena started protesting against film Padmavati, based on Sufi poet Malik Muhammad Jayasi's epic poem Padmavat (1540) about Padmavati, claiming that the film is distorting Rajput history and hurting community sentiments.

There were allegations from the group that the film is depicting inaccurate facts, with activists vandalizing the sets of the film. According to a sting operation conducted by an Indian news channel, activists may have planted the controversy in order to extort money from the filmmakers. The vandals broke the mirrors that were installed in the Chittor Fort around 50 years ago, claiming that they misrepresent the story of Padmavati, whose face, according to PAD, was shown to Alauddin Khalji using a mirror.

In January 2017, a film set was vandalized. Several historians responded to the vandalism, with The Times of India reporting, "Sufi poet Jayasi made up the story that later got legend status, so Bhansali can't be threatened for taking creative licence with the tale, say historians". Director Sanjay Leela Bhansali was assaulted by the Karni Sena on a film set, which led to a number of celebrities and public figures condemning the attack.

The Karni Sena made threats of violence, reportedly threatening to burn down theatres if the film is released to audiences before it is shown to them for evaluation. Bhansali responded to the threats by reiterating that rumours of a romantic dream sequence between Padmavati and Khalji are false, and that the film contains no such scene. The Karni Sena have held protests, supported by politicians in the ruling BJP party. Historians have criticized the protests, such as Aditya Mukherjee, who called the protests "absurd", stating that, in "the contemporary period, there is no mention of this event, no accounts of Padmavati by Amir Khusrau, a prolific writer of the era and a courtier of Alauddin Khalji. This is misuse of both fiction and history. There is no historical evidence of this Padmavati event - this story is a poet's imagination". He referred to the controversy as "manufacturing of hurt sentiments clearly with an eye on politics".

Threats were made against Bhansali and lead actress Deepika Padukone, and riot police might have been deployed at Indian cinemas. The Karni Sena threatened to assault and mutilate Padukone by cutting off her nose, which Mumbai Police responded to by giving her special security.

The Karni Sena changed its stance on 23 November, and agreed to support the release of the film, provided that the makers screen the film to the royal family of Mewar and agreed to withdraw the protests if nothing objectionable is found in the film. However, in January 2018, the group engaged in violent protests against the film, resulting in the arrest of its national secretary Suraj Pal Amu. Among other acts of violence, the Karni Sena has been accused of stoning a school bus with children in it. The Karni Sena has denied these allegations, and have claimed that their protest is non-violent.

On 2 February 2018, Karni Sena declared withdrawal of the protest against the film and stated they would help with the release of film throughout cinema houses in India, provided the name of the film is changed from PadmaVATI to PadmaaVAT.

=== Involvement in conflicts ===
Protests involving supporters of SRKS also occurred in 2009 at the University of Rajasthan, where a dispute between a Rajput student and one from the Jat caste escalated as fellow Jat students protested against the treatment of their colleague. The two castes constituted a significant proportion of students at the university and their caste associations — the SRKS and the Jat Mahasabha — tended to get support in particular from those caste members who came from small towns and villages. The caste barriers were reinforced by the existence of caste-based accommodation and tended to become particularly evident in student politics, which reflected the similar caste-based rivalry found in the politics of the state of Rajasthan itself.

In 2010, the Indian Police Service said that it had detained seven SRKS activists who were planning to disrupt an event at which Sonia Gandhi would be attending.

The organisation also participates in social services on various occasions.

On May 16, 2021, Asif Khan, a Muslim resident of Khera Khalilpur village in Nuh district of Haryana, was murdered. He was attacked by a group of men while on his way home. The motive behind his murder is disputed with claims of personal enmity and mob lynching supposedly stated as possible causes. However, Karni Sena's President Suraj Pal Amu justified Asif's murder while addressing a Mahapanchayat (large village gathering) organised by Amu Noonh, the accused caught in the case.

=== Involvement in vandalism ===
Karni sena planned an attack at the residence of Ramji Lal Suman. Many members of karni sena arrived at Agra on 26th march and vandalised the residence and other assets of Ramji Lal Suman. Several cars outside were damaged and chairs broken as the mob shattered everything. Several police personnel, including an inspector and sub-inspector and others were injured in the attack. These attacks were caused by a controversial statement of Ramji Lal Suman. On 23rd March, in house, Ramji Lal Suman said that if Muslims are the descendants of Babur, then you [Hindus] are the descendants of the traitor Rana Sanga. This statement provoked widespread outrage among Rajput communities and other groups.

== See also ==
- Rajput
- Shekhawat
