= Malasar =

Village in the Bikaner District of Rajasthan State in India

- Village
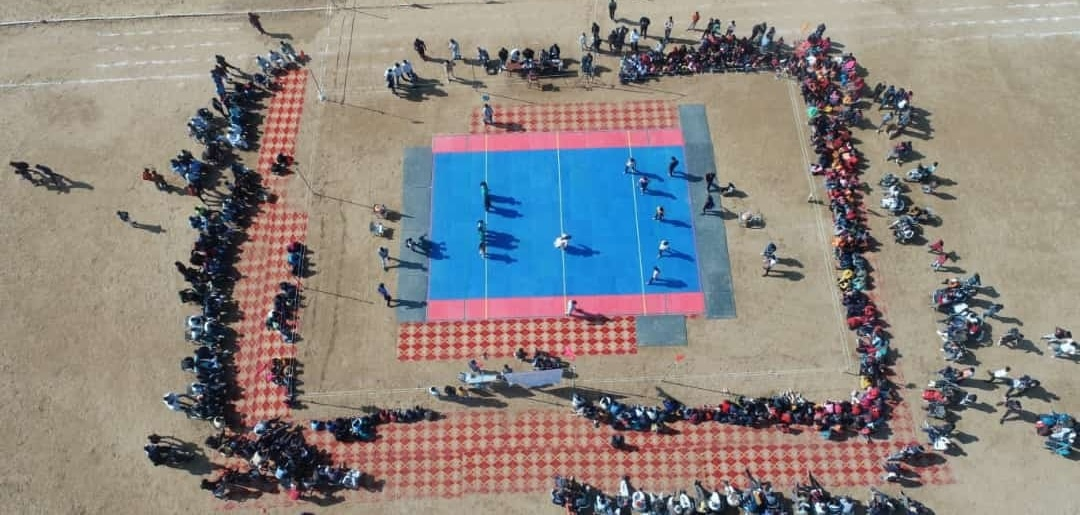
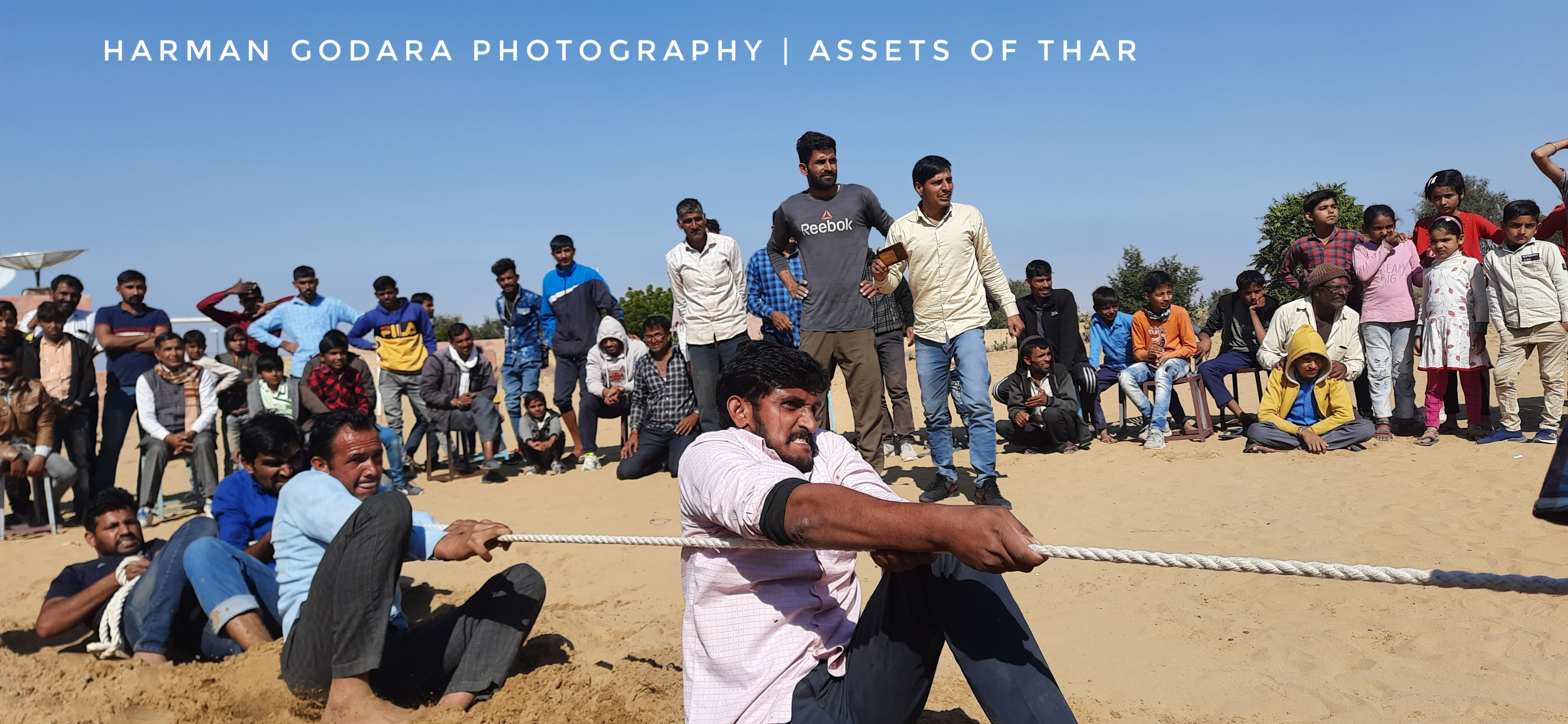
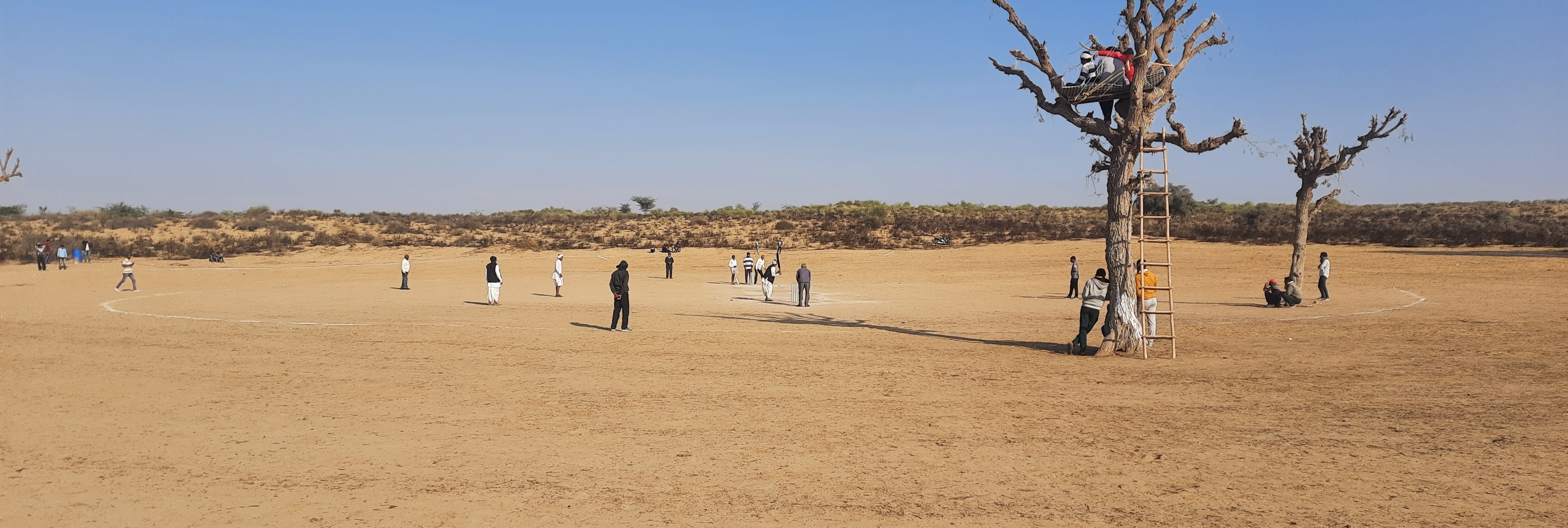
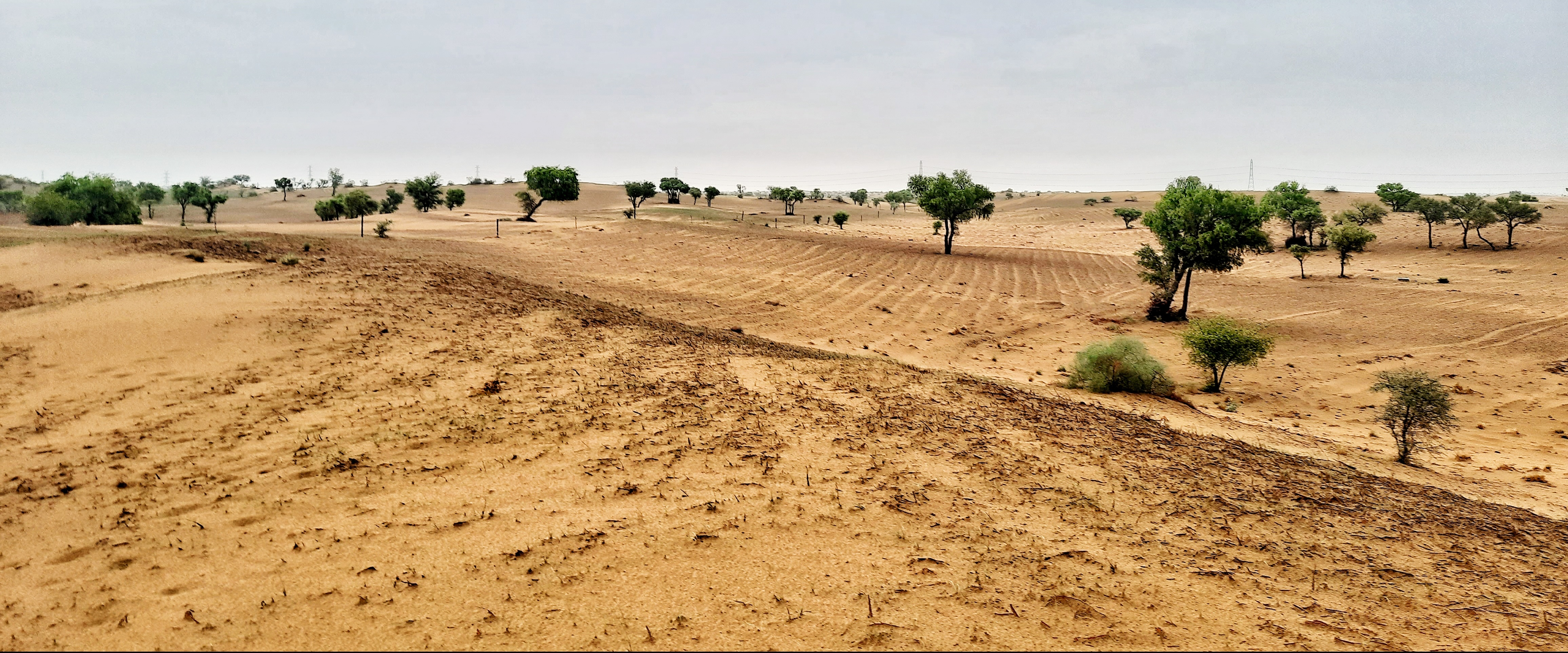
- Khel Mahakumbh 2022 Tug of war in Jan 2022 Godhkhera Cricket Ground, Malasar Outskirts of Malasar

- Location in Rajasthan, India Malasar (India)
- Coordinates: 28.229059°N 73.504921°E
- Country: India
- State: Rajasthan
- District: Bikaner
- Tehsil: Bikaner

Government
  - Type: Panchayati Raj
  - Body: Gram panchayat
- Elevation (Above Sea-level): 203 m (666 ft)

Population (2011)
  - Total: 3,500

Languages
  - Official: Marwari; Hindi
- Time zone: UTC+5:30 (IST)
- PIN: 334601
- Telephone code: 01522
- Vehicle registration: RJ-07
- Nearest city: Bikaner
- Temperature: Summer: 49.5°C (105°F); Winter: -4.1°C (44°F)

Malasar is a village located in Bikaner District in the Indian state of Rajasthan. This village is popular for its unique geographical location, beautiful sand dunes and sandy paths located in the heart of the Thar Desert.

As per the 2011 census of India, the total population of the village was 2,451 peoples, out of them 1,323 were males and 1,128 were females.

== Geography ==
The total geographic area of Malasar in 2011 was 4319 hectares. The village lies in the Lunkaransar assembly constituency and the Bikaner parliamentary constituency.

== Climate ==
The climate in Malasar is characterised by significant variations in temperature. In the summer season it is very hot when the temperatures lie in the range of 28 to 50 °C. In the winter, it is fairly cold with temperatures lying in the range of −4 to 23.2 °C. Annual rainfall is in the range of 260–440 millimetres. The highest ever temperature recorded is 49.5 °C on 19 May 2016 and lowest ever recorded is −4.0 °C on 26 January 1964.

Climate data for Malasar, Bikaner (1981–2010, extremes 1901–2012)
Month	Jan	Feb	Mar	Apr	May	Jun	Jul	Aug	Sep	Oct	Nov	Dec	Year
Record high °C (°F)	32.9 (91.2)	37.2 (99.0)	42.8 (109.0)	47.2 (117.0)	49.5 (121.1)	48.9 (120.0)	47.8 (118.0)	43.4 (110.1)	43.9 (111.0)	42.2 (108.0)	38.5 (101.3)	33.5 (92.3)	49.5 (121.1)
Mean daily maximum °C (°F)	23.4 (74.1)	26.6 (79.9)	32.4 (90.3)	38.4 (101.1)	42.0 (107.6)	41.6 (106.9)	38.6 (101.5)	37.3 (99.1)	37.6 (99.7)	36.2 (97.2)	31.1 (88.0)	25.6 (78.1)	34.2 (93.6)
Mean daily minimum °C (°F)	7.3 (45.1)	10.9 (51.6)	16.7 (62.1)	22.6 (72.7)	27.4 (81.3)	29.3 (84.7)	28.4 (83.1)	27.2 (81.0)	25.7 (78.3)	20.2 (68.4)	13.6 (56.5)	8.3 (46.9)	19.8 (67.6)
Record low °C (°F)	−4.0 (24.8)	−2.5 (27.5)	−0.6 (30.9)	8.3 (46.9)	13.7 (56.7)	17.8 (64.0)	20.5 (68.9)	20.6 (69.1)	16.5 (61.7)	7.6 (45.7)	0.6 (33.1)	−2.8 (27.0)	−4.0 (24.8)
Average rainfall mm (inches)	6.2 (0.24)	9.0 (0.35)	8.4 (0.33)	7.4 (0.29)	29.4 (1.16)	39.6 (1.56)	92.5 (3.64)	54.5 (2.15)	25.6 (1.01)	12.3 (0.48)	1.0 (0.04)	2.4 (0.09)	288.4 (11.35)
Source 1: India Meteorological Department Time and Date (dewpoints, 2005-2015)
Source 2: Weather Atlas

== Notable people ==
- Sumit Godara, Indian politician

== Demography ==
The population of Malasar, as recorded in the 2011 Census of India, stood at 3,500, with 1,798 males and 1,702 females. The village consists of around 400 families. The literacy rate in Malasar is reported to be 79%, with a positive trend in recent years. The primary occupations of the villagers include agriculture, self-employment, and jobs, including government service. In terms of caste distribution, 11% of the population belongs to the Scheduled Castes, 8% to the Scheduled Tribes, 70% to Other Backward Classes (OBC), and 11% to the General category. This demographic profile reflects the village’s diverse social structure and its reliance on agriculture and local employment.
