= Kolayat =

- Town
- Interactive map of Kolayat
- Coordinates: 27.8333°N 72.9500°E
- Country: India
- State: Rajasthan
- District: Bikaner
- Elevation: 217 m (712 ft)

Population (2001)
  - Total: 7,346

Languages
  - Official: Hindi
- Time zone: UTC+5:30 (IST)

Kolayat is a town in the Bikaner district of the Indian state of Rajasthan. It is also the headquarters of the eponymous tehsil. The town is 51 kilometres (32 mi) from Bikaner on National Highway 15 to Jaisalmer.

== History ==
Kolayat is an historical centre of pilgrimage where Kapila, a Vedic sage in Hindu tradition, is believed by some to have shed his body under a Peepul tree. Kolayat has a number of marble temples, sandstone pavilions and 52 ghats (bathing places) built around a large artificial lake.

A temple dedicated to Kapila hosts an annual fair in the month of Kartik (October - November). During full moon of this month thousands of devotees of the Sankhya philosophy gather to take a dip in Kapil Sarovar. Devotees believe the dip in the lake washes away their sins. A livestock fair, mainly for the trading of camels is part of the festivities.

Mineral Exploration Corporation Limited (MECL) had an office at Kolayat, functioning until 1997. It was wound up after the end of mineral exploration activities in the surrounding areas.

== Demographics ==
As of 2001 India census, Kolayat had a population of 7,346, of which 3,963 were male and 3,383 female.

== Attractions ==
Water Gateways
Kolayat Lake

Historical places
KapilMuni Vatika
