= List of members of the 9th Lok Sabha =

Members of Lok Sabha (1989-91)

This is a list of members of the 9th Lok Sabha arranged by state or territory represented. These members of the lower house of the Indian Parliament were elected to the 9th Lok Sabha (1989 to 1991) at the 1989 Indian general election.

== Andhra Pradesh (42) ==
Keys: INC (39) TDP (2) AIMIM (1)

No.	Constituency	Member of Parliament	Party affiliation	Roles and responsibilities
1	Srikakulam	Kanithi Viswanatham	Indian National Congress	
2	Parvathipuram (ST)	Satrucharla Vijaya Rama Raju	Indian National Congress	
3	Bobbili	Kemburi Ramamohan Rao	Telugu Desam Party	
4	Visakhapatnam	Uma Gajapathi Raju	Indian National Congress	
5	Bhadrachalam (ST)	Kamala Kumari Karredula	Indian National Congress	
6	Anakapalli	Konathala Ramakrishna	Indian National Congress	
7	Kakinada	M. M. Pallam Raju	Indian National Congress	
8	Rajahmundry	Jamuna	Indian National Congress	
9	Amalapuram (SC)	Kusuma Murthy	Indian National Congress	
10	Narasapuram	Bhupathiraju Vijayakumar Raju	Telugu Desam Party	
11	Eluru	Krishana	Indian National Congress	
12	Machilipatnam	Sambasivarao Kavuri	Indian National Congress	
13	Vijayawada	Chennupati Vidya	Indian National Congress	
14	Tenali	Basavapannayya Singam	Indian National Congress	
15	Guntur	N. G. Ranga	Indian National Congress	
16	Bapatla	Salagala Benjamin	Indian National Congress	
17	Narasaraopet	Kasu Venkata Krishna Reddy	Indian National Congress	
18	Ongole	Rajamohana Reddy Mekapati	Indian National Congress	
19	Nellore (SC)	Putchalapalli Penchalaiah	Indian National Congress	
20	Tirupati (SC)	Chinta Mohan	Indian National Congress	
21	Chittoor	Gnanendra Reddy	Indian National Congress	
22	Rajampet	Annaiahgari Sai Prathap	Indian National Congress	
23	Cuddapah	Y. S. Rajasekhara Reddy	Indian National Congress	
24	Hindupur	S. Gangadhara	Indian National Congress	
25	Anantapur	Anantha Venkata Reddy	Indian National Congress	
26	Kurnool	Kotla Vijaya Bhaskara Reddy	Indian National Congress	
27	Nandyal	Bojja Venkata Reddy	Indian National Congress	
28	Nagarkurnool (SC)	Anatha Ramulu Mullu	Indian National Congress	
29	Mahabubnagar	Mallikarjun	Indian National Congress	
30	Hyderabad	Sultan Salahuddin Owaisi	All India Majlis-e-Ittehadul Muslimeen	
31	Secunderabad	T. Manemma	Indian National Congress	
32	Siddipet (SC)	Yellaiah Nandi	Indian National Congress	
33	Medak	M. Bagareddy	Indian National Congress	
34	Nizamabad	Taduri Bala Goud	Indian National Congress	
35	Adilabad	P. Narasa Reddy	Indian National Congress	
36	Peddapalli (SC)	G. Venkat Swamy	Indian National Congress	
37	Karimnagar	Chokka Rao Juvvadi	Indian National Congress	
38	Hanamkonda	Kamaluddin Ahmed	Indian National Congress	
39	Warangal	Surender Reddy Ramasahayam	Indian National Congress	
40	Khammam	Jalagam Vengala Rao	Indian National Congress	
41	Nalgonda	Chalilam Srinivasa Rao	Indian National Congress	
42	Miryalaguda	B. N. Reddy	Indian National Congress	

== Arunachal Pradesh ==
Keys:

INC (2)

No.	Constituency	Member of Parliament	Party affiliation	Roles and responsibilities
1	Arunachal West	Prem Khandu Thungon	Indian National Congress	
2	Arunachal East	Laeta Umbrey	Indian National Congress	

== Bihar ==
JD (32) BJP (8) INC (4) CPI (4) JMM (3) CPM (1) MCC (1) IPF (1)

No.	Constituency	Member of Parliament	Party affiliation	Roles and responsibilities
1	Bagaha (SC)	Mahendra Baitha	Janata Dal	
2	Bettiah	Dharmesh Prasad Varma	Janata Dal	
3	Motihari	Radha Mohan Singh	Bharatiya Janata Party	
4	Gopalganj	Raj Mangal Mishra	Janata Dal	
5	Siwan	Janardan Tiwari	Bharatiya Janata Party	
6	Maharajganj	Chandra Shekhar	Janata Dal	
6	Maharajganj	Ram Bahadur Singh	Janata Dal	
7	Chapra	Lalu Prasad Yadav	Janata Dal	
8	Hajipur (SC)	Ram Vilas Paswan	Janata Dal	Minister of Labour (6 December 1989 – 10 November 1990); Minister of Welfare (6 December 1989 – 10 November 1990)
9	Vaishali	Usha Sinha	Janata Dal	
10	Muzaffarpur	George Fernandes	Janata Dal	Minister of Railways (6 December 1989 – 10 November 1990); Minister of Kashmir Affairs (13 March 1990 – 30 May 1990)
11	Sitamarhi	Hukmdev Narayan Yadav	Janata Dal	Minister of Textiles (21 November 1990 – 21 June 1991)
12	Sheohar	Hari Kishore Singh	Janata Dal	Minister of State in the Ministry of External Affairs (23 April 1990 – 10 November 1990)
13	Madhubani	Bhogendra Jha	Communist Party of India	
14	Jhanjharpur	Devendra Prasad Yadav	Janata Dal	
15	Darbhanga	Shakeelur Rehman	Janata Dal	Minister of Health and Family Welfare (21 November 1990 – 20 February 1991)
16	Rosera (SC)	Dasai Chowdhary	Janata Dal	Deputy Minister in Ministry of Health and Family Welfare (21 November 1990 – 21 June 1991)
17	Samastipur	Manjay Lal	Janata Dal	
18	Barh	Nitish Kumar	Janata Dal	Minister of State in the Ministry of Agriculture (Agriculture and Cooperation) (23 April 1990 – 10 November 1990)
19	Balia	Surya Narayan Singh	Communist Party of India	
20	Saharsa	Surya Narayan Yadav	Janata Dal	
21	Madhepura	Ramendra Kumar Yadav	Janata Dal	
22	Araria (SC)	Sukdeo Paswan	Janata Dal	
23	Kishanganj	M. J. Akbar	Indian National Congress	
24	Purnea	Mohammed Taslimuddin	Janata Dal	
25	Katihar	Yuvarj	Janata Dal	
26	Rajmahal (ST)	Simon Marandi	Jharkhand Mukti Morcha	
27	Dumka (ST)	Shibu Soren	Jharkhand Mukti Morcha	
28	Godda	Janardan Yadav	Bharatiya Janata Party	
29	Banka	Pratap Singh	Janata Dal	
30	Bhagalpur	Chunchun Prasad Yadav	Janata Dal	
31	Khagaria	Ram Sharan Yadav	Janata Dal	
32	Monghyr	Dhanraj Singh	Janata Dal	
33	Begusarai	Lalit Vijay Singh	Janata Dal	Minister of State for Defence (21 November 1990 – 21 June 1991)
34	Nalanda	Ram Swaroop Prasad	Indian National Congress	
35	Patna	Shailendra Nath Shrivastava	Bharatiya Janata Party	
36	Arrah	Rameshwar Prasad	Indian People's Front	
37	Buxar	Tej Narayan Singh	Communist Party of India	
38	Sasaram (SC)	Chhedi Paswan	Janata Dal	
39	Bikramganj	Ram Prasad Kushwaha	Janata Dal	
40	Aurangabad	Ram Naresh Singh	Janata Dal	
41	Jahanabad	Ramashray Prasad Singh	Communist Party of India	
42	Nawada (SC)	Prem Pradeep	Communist Party of India (Marxist)	
43	Gaya (SC)	Inswar Chaudhary	Janata Dal	
44	Chatra	Upendra Nath Verma	Janata Dal	Minister of State in the Ministry of Agriculture (Rural Development) (23 April 1990 – 10 November 1990)
45	Koderma	Rati Lal Prasad Verma	Bharatiya Janata Party	
46	Giridih	Ramdas Singh	Bharatiya Janata Party	
47	Dhanbad	A. K. Roy	Marxist Co-ordination Committee	
48	Hazaribagh	Yadunath Pandey	Bharatiya Janata Party	
49	Ranchi	Subodh Kant Sahay	Janata Dal	Minister of State in the Ministry of Home Affairs (23 April 1990 – 5 November 1990); Minister of State in the Ministry of Home Affairs (21 November 1990 – 21 June 1991); Minister of State in the Ministry of Information and Broadcasting (21 November 1990 – 21 June 1991)
50	Jamshedpur	Shailendra Mahato	Jharkhand Mukti Morcha	
51	Singhbhum (ST)	Bagua Samburi	Indian National Congress	
52	Khunti (ST)	Kariya Munda	Bharatiya Janata Party	
53	Lohardaga (ST)	Sumati Oraon	Indian National Congress	
54	Palamau (SC)	Jorawar Ram	Janata Dal	

== Goa (2) ==
No.	Constituency	Member of Parliament	Party affiliation	Roles and responsibilities
1	Panaji	Gopal Mayokar	Maharashtrawadi Gomantak Party	
2	Mormugao	Eduardo Marthinho Faleiro	Indian National Congress	

== Gujarat (26) ==
No.	Constituency	Member of Parliament	Party affiliation	Roles and responsibilities
1	Kutch	Babu Bhai Meghji Shah	Bharatiya Janata Party	
2	Surendranagar	Somabhai Gandalal Koli Patel	Bharatiya Janata Party	
3	Jamnagar	Koradiya Chandresh Kumar Valjibhai (Chandresh Patel)	Bharatiya Janata Party	
4	Rajkot	Vekaria Shivlal Nagibhai	Bharatiya Janata Party	
5	Porbandar	Manvar Balvantbhai Bachubhai	Janata Dal	
6	Junagadh	Shekhada Govindhhal Kanjibhai	Janata Dal	
7	Amreli	Manubhai Kotadiya	Janata Dal	Minister of State (Independent Charge) of Water Resources (6 December 1989 – 5 November 1990); Minister of Water Resources (21 November 1990 – 25 April 1991); Ministry of Surface Transport (21 November 1990 – 25 April 1991)
8	Bhavnagar	Jamod Shashikant Mavjibhai	Indian National Congress	
9	Dhandhuka (SC)	Ratilal Kalidas Verma	Bharatiya Janata Party	
10	Ahmedabad	Harin Pathak	Bharatiya Janata Party	
11	Gandhinagar	Veghela Shankarji Laxmanji	Bharatiya Janata Party	
12	Mehsana	A. K. Patel	Bharatiya Janata Party	
13	Patan (SC)	Chawada Khem Chandbhai Somabhai	Janata Dal	
14	Banaskantha	Shah Jayantilal Virchandbhai	Janata Dal	Minister of State for Agriculture and Co-operation (21 November 1990 – 21 June 1991)
15	Sabarkantha	Maganbhai Manibhai Patel	Janata Dal	
16	Kapadvanj	Gabhaji Mangaji Thakor	Bharatiya Janata Party	
17	Dohad (ST)	Somaibahai Damor	Indian National Congress	
18	Godhra	Patel Shantila Purushottamdas	Janata Dal	
19	Kaira	Chauhan Prabhatsinh Hathisinh	Janata Dal	
20	Anand	Patel Nathubhai Manibhai	Bharatiya Janata Party	
21	Chhota Udaipur (ST)	Rahawa Naranbhai Jamalbhai	Janata Dal	
22	Baroda	Koko alias Prakash Kanubhai Brahmbhatt	Janata Dal	
23	Broach	Deshmukh Chandubhai Shambhai	Bharatiya Janata Party	
24	Surat	Kashiram Rana	Bharatiya Janata Party	
25	Mandvi (ST)	Ghamit Chhitubhai Devibhai	Indian National Congress	
26	Bulsar (ST)	Ajunbhai Lallubhai Patel	Janata Dal	

== Haryana (10) ==
No.	Constituency	Member of Parliament	Party affiliation	Roles and responsibilities
1	Ambala (SC)	Ram Parkash	Indian National Congress	
2	Kurukshetra	Gurdial Singh Saini	Janata Dal	
3	Karnal	Chiranjit Lal	Indian National Congress	
4	Sonepat	Kapil Dev	Janata Dal	
5	Rohtak	Devi Lal	Janata Dal	Deputy Prime Minister (2 December 1989 – 1 August 1990); Minister of Agriculture (2 December 1989 – 1 August 1990); Deputy Prime Minister (10 November 1990 – 21 June 1991); Minister of Agriculture and Tourism (10 November 1990 – 21 June 1991)
6	Faridabad	Bhajan Lal	Indian National Congress	
7	Mahendragarh	Birender Singh	Janata Dal	
8	Bhiwani	Bansi Lal	Indian National Congress	
9	Hissar	Jai Parkash	Janata Dal	Deputy Minister in Ministry of Petroleum and Chemicals (21 November 1990 – 21 June 1991)
10	Sirsa (SC)	Het Ram	Janata Dal	

== Himachal Pradesh (4) ==
No.	Constituency	Member of Parliament	Party affiliation	Roles and responsibilities
1	Simla (SC)	Krishan Dutt Sultan Puri	Indian National Congress	
2	Mandi	Maheshwar Singh	Bharatiya Janata Party	
3	Kangra	Shanta Kumar	Bharatiya Janata Party	
4	Hamirpur	Thakur Prem Kumar Dhumal	Bharatiya Janata Party	

== Jammu and Kashmir (6) ==
No.	Constituency	Member of Parliament	Party affiliation	Roles and responsibilities
1	Baramulla	Saifuddin Soz	Jammu & Kashmir National Conference	
2	Srinagar	Mohammad Shafi Bhat	Jammu & Kashmir National Conference	
3	Anantnag	Piyare Lal Handoo	Jammu & Kashmir National Conference	
4	Ladakh	Mohd. Hassan	Independent politician	
5	Udhampur	Dharam Paul	Indian National Congress	
6	Jammu	Janak Raj Gupta	Indian National Congress	

== Karnataka (28) ==
INC (27) JD (1)

No.	Constituency	Member of Parliament	Party affiliation	Roles and responsibilities
1	Bidar (SC)	Narsingrao Suryawanshi	Indian National Congress	
2	Gulbarga	Basawaraj Jawali	Indian National Congress	
3	Raichur	R. Ambanna Naik Dore	Indian National Congress	
4	Koppal	Basavaraj Patil Anwari	Janata Dal	Minister of State in the Ministry of Steel and Mines (21 November 1990 – 21 June 1991)
5	Bellary	Basavarajeshwari	Indian National Congress	
6	Davangere	Channaiah Odeyar	Indian National Congress	
7	Chitradurga	C. P. Mudalagiriyappa	Indian National Congress	
8	Tumkur	G. S. Basavaraj	Indian National Congress	
9	Chikballapur	V. Krishna Rao	Indian National Congress	
10	Kolar (SC)	Y. Ramakrishna	Indian National Congress	
11	Kanakapura	M. V. Chandrashekara Murthy	Indian National Congress	
12	Bangalore North	C. K. Jaffer Sharief	Indian National Congress	
13	Bangalore South	R. Gundu Rao	Indian National Congress	
14	Mandya	G. Made Gowda	Indian National Congress	
15	Chamarajanagar (SC)	Srinivasa Prasad	Indian National Congress	
16	Mysore	Srikantadatta Narasimharaja Wadiyar	Indian National Congress	
17	Mangalore	Janardhana Poojary	Indian National Congress	
18	Udupi	Oscar Fernandes	Indian National Congress	
19	Hassan	H. C. Srikantaiah	Indian National Congress	
20	Chikmagalur	D. M. Putte Gowda	Indian National Congress	
21	Shimoga	T. V. Chandrashekarappa	Indian National Congress	
22	Kanara	G. Devaraya Naik	Indian National Congress	
23	Dharwad South	Mujahid B. M.	Indian National Congress	
24	Dharwad North	D. K. Naikar	Indian National Congress	
25	Belgaum	Sidnal Shanmukhappa Basappa	Indian National Congress	
26	Chikkodi (SC)	B. Shankaranand	Indian National Congress	
27	Bagalkot	Patil Subhash Tamannaappa	Indian National Congress	
28	Bijapur	Gudadinni Basagondappa Kadappa	Indian National Congress	

== Kerala (20) ==
No.	Constituency	Member of Parliament	Party affiliation	Roles and responsibilities
1	Kasaragod	Ramanna Rai	Communist Party of India (Marxist)	
2	Cannanore	Mullappally Ramachandran	Indian National Congress	
3	Badagara	K. P. Unnikrishnan	Indian Congress (Socialist) – Sarat Chandra Sinha	Minister of Surface Transport (6 December 1989 – 10 November 1990); Minister of Communications (6 December 1989 – 23 April 1990)
4	Calicut	K. Muraleedharan	Indian National Congress	
5	Manjeri	Ebrahim Sulaiman Sait	Indian Union Muslim League	
6	Ponnani	G. M. Banatwala	Indian Union Muslim League	
7	Palghat	A. Vijayaraghavan	Communist Party of India (Marxist)	
8	Ottapalam (SC)	K. R. Narayanan	Indian National Congress	
9	Trichur	P. A. Antony	Indian National Congress	
10	Mukundapuram	Savithri Lakshmanan	Indian National Congress	
11	Ernakulam	K. V. Thomas	Indian National Congress	
12	Muvattupuzha	P. C. Thomas	Kerala Congress (Mani)	
13	Kottayam	Ramesh Chennithala	Indian National Congress	
14	Idukki	Palai K. M. Mathew	Indian National Congress	
15	Alleppey	Vakkom Purushothaman	Indian National Congress	
16	Mavelikara	P. J. Kurien	Indian National Congress	
17	Adoor (SC)	Kodikunnil Suresh	Indian National Congress	
18	Quilon	S. Krishna Kumar	Indian National Congress	
19	Chirayinkil	Thalekunnil Basheer	Indian National Congress	
20	Trivandrum	A. Charles	Indian National Congress	

== Madhya Pradesh (40) ==
No.	Constituency	Member of Parliament	Party affiliation	Roles and responsibilities
1	Morena (SC)	Chhaviram	Bharatiya Janata Party	
2	Bhind	Narsingh Rao Dikshit	Bharatiya Janata Party	
3	Gwalior	Madhavrao Scindia	Indian National Congress	
4	Guna	Vijaya Raje Scindia	Bharatiya Janata Party	
5	Sagar (SC)	Shankar Lal	Bharatiya Janata Party	
6	Khajuraho	Uma Bharti	Bharatiya Janata Party	
7	Damoh	Lokendra Singh	Bharatiya Janata Party	
8	Satna	Sikhendra Singh	Bharatiya Janata Party	
9	Rewa	Yamuna Prasad Shastri	Janata Dal	
10	Sidhi (ST)	Jagannath Singh	Bharatiya Janata Party	
11	Shahdol (ST)	Danpat Singh Paraste	Janata Dal	
12	Surguja (ST)	Larangsai	Bharatiya Janata Party	
13	Raigarh (ST)	Nand Kumar Sai	Bharatiya Janata Party	
14	Janjgir	Dalip Singh Judeo	Bharatiya Janata Party	
15	Bilaspur (SC)	Resham Lal Jangade	Bharatiya Janata Party	
16	Sarangarh (SC)	Parasram Bhardwaj	Indian National Congress	
17	Raipur	Ramesh Bais	Bharatiya Janata Party	
18	Mahasamund	Vidya Charan Shukla	Janata Dal	Minister of External Affairs (21 November 1990 – 21 June 1991)
19	Kanker (ST)	Arvind Netam	Indian National Congress	
20	Bastar (ST)	Mankuram Sodi	Indian National Congress	
21	Durg	Purushottam Kaushik	Janata Dal	
22	Rajnandgaon	Dharam Pal Gupta	Bharatiya Janata Party	
23	Balaghat	Kankar Munjare	Independent politician	
24	Mandla (ST)	Mohan Lal	Indian National Congress	
25	Jabalpur	Babu Rao Pranjpe	Bharatiya Janata Party	
26	Seoni	Prahlad Singh	Bharatiya Janata Party	
27	Chhindwara	Kamal Nath	Indian National Congress	
28	Betul	Arif Beg	Bharatiya Janata Party	
29	Hoshangabad	Sartaj Singh	Bharatiya Janata Party	
30	Bhopal	Sushil Chandra Verma	Bharatiya Janata Party	
31	Vidisha	Raghavji	Bharatiya Janata Party	
32	Rajgarh	Pyarela Khandelwar	Bharatiya Janata Party	
33	Shajapur (SC)	Phool Chand Verma	Bharatiya Janata Party	
34	Khandwa	Amritlal (Mannibhai)	Bharatiya Janata Party	
35	Khargone	Rameshwar Pathidar	Bharatiya Janata Party	
36	Dhar (ST)	Suraj Bhanu Shiv Bhanu Solanki	Indian National Congress	
37	Indore	Sumitra Mahajan	Bharatiya Janata Party	
38	Ujjain (SC)	Satyanarayan Jatiya	Bharatiya Janata Party	
39	Jhabua (ST)	Dileepsingh Bhuria	Indian National Congress	
40	Mandsaur	Laxminarayan Pandey	Bharatiya Janata Party	

== Maharashtra (48) ==
No.	Constituency	Member of Parliament	Party affiliation	Roles and responsibilities
1	Rajapur	Madhu Dandavate	Janata Dal	Minister of Finance (5 December 1989 – 10 November 1990)
2	Ratnagiri	Nikam Govind Sawaji	Indian National Congress	
3	Kolaba	Antulay A. R.	Indian National Congress	
4	Bombay South	Deora Murli	Indian National Congress	
5	Bombay South Central	Vamanrao Mahadik	Independent politician	
6	Bombay North Central	Vidyadhar Sambhaji Gokhale	Shiv Sena	
7	Bombay North East	Mehta Jayawanti Navinchandra	Bharatiya Janata Party	
8	Bombay North West	Sunil Dutt	Indian National Congress	
9	Bombay North	Ram Naik	Bharatiya Janata Party	
10	Thane	Kapse Ramchandra Ganesh	Bharatiya Janata Party	
11	Dahanu (ST)	Damodar Baraku Shingada	Indian National Congress	
12	Nashik	Aher Daula Sonuji	Bharatiya Janata Party	
13	Malegaon (ST)	Mahale Haribhau	Janata Dal	
14	Dhule (ST)	Bhoy Reshma Motiram	Indian National Congress	
15	Nandurbar (ST)	Gavit Mankrao Hodlya	Indian National Congress	
16	Erandol	Patil Uttamrao Laxmanrao	Bharatiya Janata Party	
17	Jalgaon	Mahajan Yadav Shivram	Indian National Congress	
18	Buldhana (SC)	Kale Sukhdeo Nandaji	Bharatiya Janata Party	
19	Akola	Phundkar Pandurang Pundlik	Bharatiya Janata Party	
20	Washim	Deshmukh Anantrao Vitthalrao	Indian National Congress	
21	Amravati	Sudam Deshmukh	Communist Party of India	
22	Ramtek	P. V. Narsimharao	Indian National Congress	
23	Nagpur	Purhit Banwarilal Bhagwandas	Indian National Congress	
24	Bhandara	Khushal Parasram Sopche	Bharatiya Janata Party	
25	Chimur	Shivankar Manoharrao Sukaji	Bharatiya Janata Party	
26	Chandrapur	Potdukhe Shantaram Rajeshwar	Indian National Congress	
27	Wardha	Sathe Vasant Purushottam	Indian National Congress	
28	Yavatmal	Uttamrao Deorao Patil	Indian National Congress	
29	Hingoli	Uttam Rathod	Indian National Congress	
30	Nanded	Kabde Venkatesh Rukhmaji	Janata Dal	
31	Parbhani	Deshmukh Ashok Anandrao	Independent politician	
32	Jalna	Pundlik Hari Danwe	Bharatiya Janata Party	
33	Aurangabad	Moroshwar Save	Independent politician	
34	Beed	Dhakno Babanrao Dadaba	Janata Dal	Minister of State in the Ministry of Energy (21 November 1990 – 21 June 1991)
35	Latur	Patil Shivraj Vishwanath	Indian National Congress	Deputy Speaker of the Lok Sabha (19 March 1990 - 13 March 1991)
36	Osmanabad (SC)	Kamble Arvind Tulshiram	Indian National Congress	
37	Sholapur	Sadul Dharmanna Mondayya	Indian National Congress	
38	Pandharpur (SC)	Thorat Sandipan Bhagwan	Indian National Congress	
39	Ahmednagar	Gadakh Y. K.	Indian National Congress	
40	Kopargaon	Vikhe E. V.	Indian National Congress	
41	Khed	Bankhele Kisanrao Baburao	Janata Dal	
42	Pune	Gadgil Vitthalaro Narhar	Indian National Congress	
43	Baramati	Patil Shankarrao Bajirao	Indian National Congress	
44	Satara	Bhosale Prataprao Baburao	Indian National Congress	
45	Karad	Chavan Premalabai Dajisaheb	Indian National Congress	
46	Sangli	Patil Prakashbapu Vasantrao	Indian National Congress	
47	Ichalkaranji	Mane Balasaheb alias Rajaram Shankarrao	Indian National Congress	
48	Kolhapur	Gaikwad Udaysingrao Nanasaheb	Indian National Congress	

== Manipur (2) ==
No.	Constituency	Member of Parliament	Party affiliation	Roles and responsibilities
1	Inner Manipur	N. Tombi Singh	Indian National Congress	
2	Outer Manipur (ST)	Meijinlung Kamson	Indian National Congress	

== Meghalaya (2) ==
No.	Constituency	Member of Parliament	Party affiliation	Roles and responsibilities
1	Shillong	Peter G. Marbaning	Indian National Congress	
2	Tura	Sanford Marak	Indian National Congress	

== Mizoram (1) ==
No.	Constituency	Member of Parliament	Party affiliation	Roles and responsibilities
1	Mizoram (ST)	C. Silvera	Indian National Congress	

== Nagaland (1) ==
No.	Constituency	Member of Parliament	Party affiliation	Roles and responsibilities
1	Nagaland	Shikino Sam	Indian National Congress	

== Orissa (21) ==
No.	Constituency	Member of Parliament	Party affiliation	Roles and responsibilities
1	Mayurbhanj (ST)	Bhagey Gobardhan	Janata Dal	Minister of State in the Ministry of Programme Implementation (April 23, 1990 – November 10, 1990).
2	Balasore	Samarendra Kundu	Janata Dal	
3	Bhadrak (SC)	Mangararaj Malik	Janata Dal	
4	Jajpur (SC)	Anadi Charan Das	Janata Dal	
5	Kendrapara	Rabi Ray	Janata Dal	Speaker of the Lok Sabha (19 December 1989 - 9 July 1991)
6	Cuttack	Srikant Kumar Jena	Janata Dal	Minister of State in the Ministry of Industry (Small Scale Industries and Agro and Rural Industries) (April 23, 1990 – November 10, 1990)
7	Jagatsinghpur	Lokanath Choudhary	Communist Party of India	
8	Puri	Nilamani Routray	Janata Dal	Minister of Health and Family Welfare (December 6, 1989 – April 23, 1990); Minister of Environment and Forests (April 23, 1990 – November 10, 1990).
9	Bhubaneswar	Sivaji Patnaik	Communist Party of India (Marxist)	
10	Aska	Ananta Narayan Singh Deo	Janata Dal	
11	Berhampur	Gopinath Gajapati	Indian National Congress	
12	Koraput (ST)	Giridhar Gamang	Indian National Congress	
13	Nowrangpur (ST)	Khagapati Pradhani	Indian National Congress	
14	Kalahandi	Bhakta Charan Das	Janata Dal	Deputy Minister in the Ministry of Human Resource Development (Youth Affairs and Sports) (April 23, 1990 – November 5, 1990); Deputy Minister in the Ministry of Welfare (Women and Child Development) (April 23, 1990 – November 5, 1990).; Minister of State for Railways (Took office November 21, 1990; Left office June 21, 1991).
15	Phulbani (SC)	Nakul Nayak	Janata Dal	
16	Bolangir	Balgopal Mishra	Janata Dal	
17	Sambalpur	Bhabani Shankar Hota	Janata Dal	
18	Deogarh	Ravi Narayan Pani	Janata Dal	
19	Dhenkanal	Bhajaman Behara	Janata Dal	Minister of State in the Ministry of Petroleum and Chemicals (April 23, 1990 – November 10, 1990)
20	Sundargarh (ST)	Debananda Amat	Janata Dal	
21	Keonjhar (ST)	Govind Chandra Munda	Janata Dal	

== Punjab (13) ==
No.	Constituency	Member of Parliament	Party affiliation	Roles and responsibilities
1	Gurdaspur	Sukhbans Kaur Bhinder	Indian National Congress	
2	Amritsar	Kirpal Singh	Independent politician (Note: Backed by Shiromani Akali Dal (Simranjit Singh Mann))	
3	Tarn Taran	Simranjit Singh Mann	Shiromani Akali Dal (Simranjit Singh Mann)	
4	Jullundur	I. K. Gujral	Janata Dal	Minister of External Affairs (6 December 1989 – 10 November 1990)
5	Phillaur (SC)	Harbhajan Lakha	Bahujan Samaj Party	
6	Hoshiarpur	Kamal Chaudhry	Indian National Congress	
7	Ropar (SC)	Bimal Kaur Khalsa	Shiromani Akali Dal (Simranjit Singh Mann)	
8	Patiala	Atinderpal Singh	Independent politician (Note: Backed by Shiromani Akali Dal (Simranjit Singh Mann))	
9	Ludhiana	Rajinder Kaur Bulara	Shiromani Akali Dal (Simranjit Singh Mann)	
10	Sangrur	Rajdev Singh	Shiromani Akali Dal (Simranjit Singh Mann)	
11	Bhatinda (SC)	Baba Sucha Singh	Shiromani Akali Dal (Simranjit Singh Mann)	
12	Faridkot	Jagdev Singh Khudian	Shiromani Akali Dal (Simranjit Singh Mann)	
13	Ferozepur	Dhian Singh Mand	Independent politician (Note: Backed by Shiromani Akali Dal (Simranjit Singh Mann))	

== Rajasthan ==
BJP (13) JD (11) CPM (1)

No.	Constituency	Member of Parliament	Party affiliation	Roles and responsibilities
1	Ganganagar (SC)	Bega Ram Chauhan	Janata Dal	
2	Bikaner	Shopat Singh Makkassar	Communist Party of India (Marxist)	
3	Churu	Daulat Ram Saran	Janata Dal	Minister of Urban Development (21 November 1990 – 21 June 1991)
4	Jhunjhunu	Jagdeep Dhankhar	Janata Dal	Deputy Minister in the Ministry of Parliamentary Affairs (23 April 1990 – 5 November 1990)
5	Sikar	Devi Lal	Janata Dal	Deputy Prime Minister (2 December 1989 – 1 August 1990); Minister of Agriculture (2 December 1989 – 1 August 1990); Deputy Prime Minister (10 November 1990 – 21 June 1991); Minister of Agriculture and Tourism (10 November 1990 – 21 June 1991)
6	Jaipur	Girdhari Lal Bhargava	Bharatiya Janata Party	
7	Dausa	Nathu Singh Gurjar	Bharatiya Janata Party	
8	Alwar	Ramji Lal Yadav	Janata Dal	
9	Bharatpur	Vishvendra Singh	Janata Dal	
10	Bayana (SC)	Than Singh Jatav	Bharatiya Janata Party	
11	Sawai Madhopur (ST)	Kirodi Lal Meena	Bharatiya Janata Party	
12	Ajmer	Rasa Singh Rawat	Bharatiya Janata Party	
13	Tonk (SC)	Gopal Pacherwal	Janata Dal	
14	Kota	Dau Dayal Joshi	Bharatiya Janata Party	
15	Jhalawar	Vasundhara Raje	Bharatiya Janata Party	
16	Banswara (ST)	Heera Bhai	Janata Dal	
17	Salumber (ST)	Nand Lal Meena	Bharatiya Janata Party	
18	Udaipur	Gulab Chand Kataria	Bharatiya Janata Party	
19	Chittorgarh	Mahendra Singh Mewar	Bharatiya Janata Party	
20	Bhilwara	Hemendra Singh Banera	Janata Dal	
21	Pali	Guman Mal Lodha	Bharatiya Janata Party	
22	Jalore (SC)	Kailash Chandra Meghwal	Bharatiya Janata Party	
23	Barmer	Kalyan Singh Kalvi	Janata Dal	Ministry of Energy (21 November 1990 – 25 April 1991)
24	Jodhpur	Jaswant Singh	Bharatiya Janata Party	
25	Nagaur	Nathuram Mirdha	Janata Dal	Minister of Food and Civil Supplies (8 December 1989 – 10 November 1990)

== Sikkim (1) ==
No.	Constituency	Member of Parliament	Party affiliation	Roles and responsibilities
1	Sikkim	Nandu Thapa	Sikkim Sangram Parishad	

== Tamil Nadu (39) ==
No.	Constituency	Member of Parliament	Party affiliation	Roles and responsibilities
1	Madras North	D. Pandian	Indian National Congress	
2	Madras Central	Anbarasu Era	Indian National Congress	
3	Madras South	Vyjayantimala Bali	Indian National Congress	
4	Sriperumbudur (SC)	Maragatham Chandrasekhar	Indian National Congress	
5	Chengalpattu	Kanchee Paneer	All India Anna Dravida Munnetra Kazhagam	
6	Arakkonam	R. Jeevarathinam	Indian National Congress	
7	Vellore	A. K. A. Abdul Samad	Indian National Congress	
8	Tiruppattur	A. Jayamohan	Indian National Congress	
9	Vandavasi	L. Balaraman	Indian National Congress	
10	Tindivanam	R. Eramadass	Indian National Congress	
11	Cuddalore	P. R. S. Venkatesan	Indian National Congress	
12	Chidambaram (SC)	P. Vallalperuman	Indian National Congress	
13	Dharmapuri	M. G. Sekhar	All India Anna Dravida Munnetra Kazhagam	
14	Krishnagiri	K. Ramamoorthy	Indian National Congress	
15	Rasipuram (SC)	B. Devarajan	Indian National Congress	
16	Salem	Rangarajan Kumaramangalam	Indian National Congress	
17	Tiruchengode	K. C. Palanisamy	All India Anna Dravida Munnetra Kazhagam	
18	Nilgiris	R. Prabhu	Indian National Congress	
19	Gobichettipalayam	P. G. Narayanan	All India Anna Dravida Munnetra Kazhagam	
20	Coimbatore	C. K. Kuppusamy	Indian National Congress	
21	Pollachi (SC)	B. Raja Ravi Varma	All India Anna Dravida Munnetra Kazhagam	
22	Palani	A. Senapathi Gounder	Indian National Congress	
23	Dindigul	C. Srinivasan	All India Anna Dravida Munnetra Kazhagam	
24	Madurai	A. G. S. Ram Babu	Indian National Congress	
25	Periyakulam	R. Mothiah	All India Anna Dravida Munnetra Kazhagam	
26	Karur	M. Thambithurai	All India Anna Dravida Munnetra Kazhagam	
27	Tiruchirappalli	L. Adaikalaraj	Indian National Congress	
28	Perambalur (SC)	A. Asokaraj	All India Anna Dravida Munnetra Kazhagam	
29	Mayiladuthurai	Pakeer Mohamed Hajee E. S. M.	Indian National Congress	
30	Nagapattinam (SC)	M. Selvarasu	Communist Party of India	
31	Thanjavur	S. Singravadivel	Indian National Congress	
32	Pudukottai	N. Sundaraja	Indian National Congress	
33	Sivaganga	P. Chidambaram	Indian National Congress	
34	Ramanathapuram	V. Rajeswaran	Indian National Congress	
35	Sivakasi	K. Kalimuthu	All India Anna Dravida Munnetra Kazhagam	
36	Tirunelveli	Janarthanan	All India Anna Dravida Munnetra Kazhagam	
37	Tenkasi (SC)	M. Arunachalam	Indian National Congress	
38	Tiruchendur	R. Dhanuskodi Athithan	Indian National Congress	
39	Nagercoil	N. Dennis	Indian National Congress	

== Tripura (2) ==
No.	Constituency	Member of Parliament	Party affiliation	Roles and responsibilities
1	Tripura West	Santosh Mohan Dev	Indian National Congress	
2	Tripura East (ST)	Manikya Bikram Kishore Debbarma Bahadur	Indian National Congress	

== Uttar Pradesh ==
JD (54) INC (15) BJP (8) BSP (2) CPI (2) CPM (1) HMS (1) Ind (2)

No.	Constituency	Member of Parliament	Party affiliation	Roles and responsibilities
1	Tehri Garhwal	Brahm Dutt	Indian National Congress	
2	Garhwal	Chandra Mohan Singh Negi	Janata Dal	
3	Almora	Harish Rawat	Indian National Congress	
4	Nainital	Mahendra Singh Pal	Janata Dal	
5	Bijnor (SC)	Mayawati	Bahujan Samaj Party	
6	Amroha	Har Govind Singh	Janata Dal	
7	Moradabad	Ghulam Mohammad Khan	Janata Dal	
8	Rampur	Zulfiqar Ali Khan	Indian National Congress	
9	Sambhal	S. P. Yadava	Janata Dal	
10	Budaun	Sharad Yadav	Janata Dal	
11	Aonla	Raj Veer Singh	Bharatiya Janata Party	
12	Bareilly	Santosh Kumar Gangwar	Bharatiya Janata Party	
13	Pilibhit	Maneka Gandhi	Janata Dal	Minister of State in the Ministry of Environment and Forests (December 6, 1989 – November 6, 1990).; Minister of State (Independent Charge) of the Ministry of Environment & Forests (Took office November 21, 1990; Left office June 21, 1991)
14	Shahjahanpur	Satay Pal Singh	Janata Dal	
15	Kheri	Usha Verma	Indian National Congress	
16	Shahabad	Dharamgaj Singh	Indian National Congress	
17	Sitapur	Rajendra Kumari Bajpai	Indian National Congress	
18	Misrikh (SC)	Ram Lal Rahi	Indian National Congress	
19	Hardoi (SC)	Parmai Lal	Janata Dal	
20	Lucknow	Mandhata Singh	Janata Dal	
21	Mohanlalganj (SC)	Sarju Prasad Saroj	Janata Dal	
22	Unnao	Anwar Ahmad	Janata Dal	
23	Rae Bareli	Sheila Kaul	Indian National Congress	
24	Pratapgarh	Raja Dinesh Singh	Indian National Congress	
25	Amethi	Rajiv Gandhi	Indian National Congress	Leader of the Opposition in Lok Sabha (18 December 1989 - 23 December 1990)
26	Sultanpur	Ram Singh	Janata Dal	
27	Akbarpur (SC)	Ram Awadh	Janata Dal	
28	Faizabad	Mitra Sen	Communist Party of India	
29	Bara Banki (SC)	Ram Sagar	Janata Dal	
30	Kaiserganj	Rudra Sen Chaudhary	Bharatiya Janata Party	
31	Bahraich	Arif Mohammed Khan	Janata Dal	
32	Balrampur	Fasiur-aahman Aliyas Munnan Khan	Independent politician	
33	Gonda	Anand Singh (Alias Annu Bhaiya)	Indian National Congress	
34	Basti (SC)	Kalpa Nath Sonakar	Janata Dal	
35	Domariaganj	Brij Bhushan Tiwari	Janata Dal	
36	Khalilabad	Ram Prasad Chaudhary	Janata Dal	
37	Bansgaon (SC)	Mahabir Prasad	Indian National Congress	
38	Gorakhpur	Avedya Nath	Hindu Mahasabha	
39	Maharajganj	Harsh Vardhan	Janata Dal	
40	Padrauna	Baleshar	Janata Dal	
41	Deoria	Rajmangal	Janata Dal	Minister of Human Resource Development (November 21, 1990 – June 21, 1991).
42	Salempur	Hari Kewal	Janata Dal	
43	Ballia	Chandra Shekhar	Janata Dal	Prime Minister; in-charge of all other important unallocated portfolios (November 10, 1990 – June 21, 1991)
44	Ghosi	Kalp Nath	Indian National Congress	
45	Azamgarh	Ram Kishana	Bahujan Samaj Party	
46	Lalganj (SC)	Ram Dhan	Janata Dal	
47	Machhlisahr	Shiv Sharan Verma	Janata Dal	
48	Jaunpur	Raja Yadvendra Dutta	Bharatiya Janata Party	
49	Saidpur (SC)	Ram Ragar	Bharatiya Janata Party	
50	Ghazipur	Jagdish	Independent politician	
51	Chandauli	Kailash Nath Singh Yadav	Janata Dal	
52	Varanasi	Anil Shastri	Janata Dal	Deputy Minister in the Ministry of Finance (April 23, 1990 – November 10, 1990).
53	Robertsganj (SC)	Subedar	Bharatiya Janata Party	
54	Mirzapur	Yusa Beg	Janata Dal	
55	Phulpur	Ram Pujan Patel	Janata Dal	Minister of State in the Ministry of Food and Civil Supplies (April 23, 1990 – November 10, 1990).
56	Allahabad	Janeswhar Mishra	Janata Dal	Minister of State (Independent Charge) of Communications (April 23, 1990 – November 10, 1990). Railways (November 21, 1990 – June 21, 1991).
57	Chail (SC)	Ram Nihor Rakesh	Indian National Congress	
58	Fatehpur	Vishwanath Pratap Singh	Janata Dal	Prime Minister; in-charge of all other important unallocated portfolios (December 2, 1989 – November 10, 1990)
59	Banda	Ram Sajiwan	Communist Party of India	
60	Hamirpur	Ganga Charan	Janata Dal	
61	Jhansi	Rajendra Agnihotri	Bharatiya Janata Party	
62	Jalaun (SC)	Ram Sewak Bhatiya	Janata Dal	
63	Ghatampur (SC)	Keshari Lal	Janata Dal	
64	Bilhaur	Arun Kumar Nehru	Janata Dal	
65	Kanpur	Subhashini Ali	Communist Party of India (Marxist)	
66	Etawah	Ram Singh Shakya	Janata Dal	
67	Kannauj	Chhotey Singh Yadav	Janata Dal	
68	Farrukhabad	Santosh Bhartiya	Janata Dal	
69	Mainpuri	Uday Pratap Singh	Janata Dal	
70	Jalesar	Ch. Multan Signh	Janata Dal	
71	Etah	Mahadeepk Singh	Bharatiya Janata Party	
72	Firozabad (SC)	Ramji Lal Suman	Janata Dal	Minister of State in the Ministry of Labour and Ministry of Welfare (Took office November 21, 1990; Left office June 21, 1991)
73	Agra	Ajay Singh	Janata Dal	Deputy Minister in the Ministry of Railways (April 23, 1990 – November 10, 1990).
74	Mathura	Manvendra Singh	Janata Dal	
75	Hathras (SC)	Bangali Singh	Janata Dal	
76	Aligarh	Satya Pal Malik	Janata Dal	Minister of State in the Ministry of Parliamentary Affairs and Minister of State in the Ministry of Tourism (April 23, 1990 – November 10, 1990).
77	Khurja (SC)	Bhagwan Dass	Janata Dal	
78	Bulandshahr	Sarvar Husain	Janata Dal	Minister of State in the Ministry of Food and Civil supplies (Took office November 21, 1990; Left office June 21, 1991)
79	Hapur	K. C. Tyagi (Kishan Chand)	Janata Dal	
80	Meerut	Harish Pal	Janata Dal	
81	Baghpat	Ajeet Singh	Janata Dal	
82	Muzaffarnagar	Mufti Mohammad Sayeed	Janata Dal	
83	Kairana	Har Pal	Janata Dal	
84	Saharanpur	Rashid Masood	Janata Dal	Minister of State (Independent Charge) of Health and Family Welfare (April 23, 1990 – November 10, 1990).
85	Hardwar (SC)	Jagpal Singh	Indian National Congress	

== West Bengal (42) ==
No.	Constituency	Member of Parliament	Party affiliation	Roles and responsibilities
1	Cooch Behar (SC)	Amar Roy Pradhan	All India Forward Bloc	
2	Alipurduars (ST)	Pius Tirkey	Revolutionary Socialist Party	
3	Jalpaiguri	Manik Sanyal	Communist Party of India (Marxist)	
4	Darjeeling	Inderjeet	Gorkha National Liberation Front	
5	Raiganj	Golam Yazdani	Indian National Congress	
6	Balurghat (SC)	Palas Barman	Revolutionary Socialist Party	
7	Malda	A. B. A. Ghani Khan Choudhury	Indian National Congress	
8	Jangipur	Zainal Abedin	Communist Party of India (Marxist)	
9	Murshidabad	Syed Masudal Hossain	Communist Party of India (Marxist)	
10	Berhampore	Mani Bhattacharya	Revolutionary Socialist Party	
11	Krishnagar	Ajoy Mukherjee	Communist Party of India (Marxist)	
12	Nabadwip (SC)	Asim Bala	Communist Party of India (Marxist)	
13	Barasat	Chitta Basu	All India Forward Bloc	
14	Basirhat	Monoranjan Sur	Communist Party of India	
15	Joynagar (SC)	Sanat Kumar Mandal	Revolutionary Socialist Party	
16	Mathurapur (SC)	Radhikaranjan Pramanik	Communist Party of India (Marxist)	
17	Diamond Harbour	Amal Datta	Communist Party of India (Marxist)	
18	Jadavpur	Malini Bhattacharya	Communist Party of India (Marxist)	
19	Barrackpore	Tarit Baran Topder	Communist Party of India (Marxist)	
20	Dum Dum	Nirmal Kanti Chatterjee	Communist Party of India (Marxist)	
21	Calcutta North West	Debi Prasad Pal	Indian National Congress	
22	Calcutta North East	Ajit Kumar Panja	Indian National Congress	
23	Calcutta South	Biplab Dasgupta	Communist Party of India (Marxist)	
24	Howrah	Sushanta Chakarborty	Communist Party of India (Marxist)	
25	Uluberia	Hanan Mollah	Communist Party of India (Marxist)	
26	Serampore	Sudarsan Ray Chowdhuri	Communist Party of India (Marxist)	
27	Hooghly	Rupchand Pal	Communist Party of India (Marxist)	
28	Arambagh	Anil Basu	Communist Party of India (Marxist)	
29	Panskura	Gita Mukherjee	Communist Party of India	
30	Tamluk	Satyagopal Mistra	Communist Party of India (Marxist)	
31	Contai	Sudhir Giri	Communist Party of India (Marxist)	
32	Midnapore	Indrajit Gupta	Communist Party of India	
33	Jhargram (ST)	Matilal Hansda	Communist Party of India (Marxist)	
34	Purulia	Chitta Ranjan Mahata	All India Forward Bloc	
35	Bankura	Basudeb Acharia	Communist Party of India (Marxist)	
36	Vishnupur (SC)	Sukhendu Khan	Communist Party of India (Marxist)	
37	Durgapur (SC)	Purna Chandra Malik	Communist Party of India (Marxist)	
38	Asansol	Haradhan Roy	Communist Party of India (Marxist)	
39	Burdwan	Sudhir Ray	Communist Party of India (Marxist)	
40	Katwa	Saifuddin Chaudhury	Communist Party of India (Marxist)	
41	Bolpur	Somnath Chatterjee	Communist Party of India (Marxist)	
42	Birbhum (SC)	Dome Ramchandra	Communist Party of India (Marxist)	

== Andaman and Nicobar Islands (1) ==
No.	Constituency	Member of Parliament	Party affiliation	Roles and responsibilities
1	Andaman & Nicobar Islands	Manoranjan Bhakta	Indian National Congress	

== Chandigarh (1) ==
No.	Constituency	Member of Parliament	Party affiliation	Roles and responsibilities
1	Chandigarh	Harmohan Dhawan	Janata Dal	Minister of State (Independent Charge) of the Ministry of Civil Aviations; (Took office November 21, 1990 – Left office June 21, 1991)

== Dadra and Nagar Haveli (1) ==
No.	Constituency	Member of Parliament	Party affiliation	Roles and responsibilities
1	Dadra & Nagar Haveli (ST)	Mohanbhai Sanjibhai Delkar	Independent politician	

== Daman and Diu (1) ==
No.	Constituency	Member of Parliament	Party affiliation	Roles and responsibilities
1	Daman and Diu	Tandel Devji Jogibhai	Independent politician	

== National Capital Territory of Delhi (7) ==
No.	Constituency	Member of Parliament	Party affiliation	Roles and responsibilities
1	New Delhi	Lal Krishna Advani	Bharatiya Janata Party	
2	South Delhi	Madan Lal Khurana	Bharatiya Janata Party	
3	Outer Delhi	Tarif Singh	Janata Dal	
4	East Delhi	H. K. L. Bhagat	Indian National Congress	
5	Chandni Chowk	Jai Prakash Aggarwal	Indian National Congress	
6	Delhi Sadar	Vijay Kumar Malhotra	Bharatiya Janata Party	
7	Karol Bagh (SC)	Kalka Dass	Bharatiya Janata Party	

== Lakshadweep (1) ==
No.	Constituency	Member of Parliament	Party affiliation	Roles and responsibilities
1	Lakshadweep (ST)	P. M. Sayeed	Indian National Congress	

== Pondicherry (1) ==
No.	Constituency	Member of Parliament	Party affiliation	Roles and responsibilities
1	Pondicherry	P. Shanmugam	Indian National Congress	
