= Shahpura district =

- District of Rajasthan
- Location of Shahpura district in Rajasthan
- Country: India
- State: Rajasthan
- Division: Ajmer
- Headquarters: Shahpura

Government
  - Zila Pramukh: Saroj Bansal
- Time zone: UTC+05:30 (IST)
- Website: shahpura.rajasthan.gov.in

Shapura district is a state subdivision in the Indian state of Rajasthan. Shahpura serves as the headquarter of the district. The formation of the district was announced in March 2023 by then Chief Minister Ashok Gehlot.

== Politics ==
The district has two assembly constituencies,

- Shahpura Assembly constituency, 181 – MLA Lalaram Bairwa
- Jahazpur Assembly constituency, 182 – Gopichand Meena

== Subdivisions and Blocks ==
- Banera
- Jahazpur
- Kacholiya
- Kotri Dhaylan
- Phooliya Kalan
- Shahpura

== Recent Updates ==
On 28 December 2024, the Cabinet of Rajasthan decided not to retain 9 new districts- Anupgarh, Dudu, Gangapur City, Jaipur Rural, Jodhpur Rural, Kekri, Neem Ka Thana, Sanchore, and Shahpura- along with the 3 newly created divisions--Banswara, Pali, and Sikar.
