= Bhilwara Lok Sabha constituency =

Lok Sabha Constituency in Rajasthan

Coordinates: 25.3°N 74.6°E

Bhilwara
- Lok Sabha constituency
- Interactive Map Outlining Bhilwara Lok Sabha Constituency

Constituency details
- Country: India
- Region: North India
- State: Rajasthan
- Assembly constituencies: Asind; Mandal; Sahara; Bhilwara; Shahpura; Jahazpur; Mandalgarh; Hindoli
- Established: 1952
- Reservation: None

Member of Parliament
- 18th Lok Sabha
- Incumbent Damodar Agarwal
- Party: Bharatiya Janata Party
- Elected year: 2024

Bhilwara Lok Sabha constituency (Hindi pronunciation: [bʱiːl.ʋaːɽaː]) is one of the 25 Lok Sabha (parliamentary) constituencies in Rajasthan state in India.

== Assembly segments ==
Presently, Bhilwara Lok Sabha constituency comprises eight Vidhan Sabha (legislative assembly) segments. These are:

#	Name	District	Member	Party	2024 Lead
177	Asind	Bhilwara	Jabbar Singh Sankhala	BJP	BJP
178	Mandal	Bhilwara	Udai Lal Bhadana	BJP	BJP
179	Sahara	Bhilwara	Ladu Lal Pitliya	BJP	BJP
180	Bhilwara	Bhilwara	Ashok Kumar Kothari	BJP	BJP
181	Shahpura (SC)	Bhilwara	Lalaram Bairwa	BJP	BJP
182	Jahazpur	Bhilwara	Gopichand Meena	BJP	BJP
183	Mandalgarh	Bhilwara	Gopal Lal Sharma	BJP	BJP
184	Hindoli	Bundi	Ashok Chandna	INC	BJP

== Members of Parliament ==
Year	Member	Party
1952	Hari Ram Nathany	Ram Rajya Parishad
1957	Ramesh Chandra Vyas	Indian National Congress
1962	K. L. Shrimali	Indian National Congress
1967	Ramesh Chandra Vyas	Indian National Congress
1971	Hemendra Singh Banera	Bharatiya Jana Sangh
1977	Rooplal Somani	Janata Party
1980	Girdhari Lal Vyas	Indian National Congress
1984	Girdhari Lal Vyas	Indian National Congress
1989	Hemendra Singh Banera	Janata Dal
1991	Shiv Charan Mathur	Indian National Congress
1996	Subhash Baheria	Bharatiya Janata Party
1998	Rampal Upadhyay	Indian National Congress
1999	V. P. Singh Badnore	Bharatiya Janata Party
2004	V. P. Singh Badnore	Bharatiya Janata Party
2009	C. P. Joshi	Indian National Congress
2014	Subhash Baheria	Bharatiya Janata Party
2019	Subhash Baheria	Bharatiya Janata Party
2024	Damodar Agarwal	Bharatiya Janata Party

== Election results ==
=== 2024 ===
2024 Indian general election: Bhilwara
Party	Candidate	Votes	%	±%
BJP	Damodar Agarwal	807,640	61.9	
INC	C. P. Joshi	4,53,034	34.7	
NOTA	None of the above			
Majority				
Turnout		13,05,144	60.74	
BJP hold		Swing		

=== 2019 ===
2019 Indian general elections: Bhilwara
Party	Candidate	Votes	%	±%
BJP	Subhash Chandra Baheria	936,065	71.60	
INC	Ram Pal Sharma	325,145	24.87	
BSP	Shivlal Gurjar	15,599	1.19	
RRP	Pawan Kumar Sharma (activist)	13,148	1	
NOTA	None of the Above	17,388	1.33	
Margin of victory		611,460	46.73	
Turnout		1,311,011	65.64	
BJP hold		Swing		

=== 2014 ===
2014 Indian general elections: Bhilwara
Party	Candidate	Votes	%	±%
BJP	Subhash Chandra Baheria	630,317	57.09	
INC	Ashok Chandna	384,053	34.78	
NOTA	None of the Above	19,698	1.78	
BSP	Govind Kumar Bairwa	15,088	1.37	
Margin of victory		246,264	22.30	
Turnout		1,104,156	62.92	
BJP gain from INC		Swing		

=== 2009 ===
2009 Indian general elections: Bhilwara
Party	Candidate	Votes	%	±%
INC	C. P. Joshi	413,128	54.74	
BJP	Vijayendra Pal Singh	277,760	36.80	
BSP	Harish Gurjar	28,141	3.73	
Independent	Ram Prasad Sirotha	17,208	2.28	
Margin of victory		135,368	17.94	
Turnout		754,457	50.54	
INC gain from BJP		Swing		

=== 2004 ===
2004 Indian general elections: Bhilwara
Party	Candidate	Votes	%	±%
BJP	V.P. Singh Badnore	317,292	51.20	+3.24
INC	Kailash Vyas	256,640	41.41	−4.18
Independent	Mubariq	24,896	4.02	
BSP	Ramgopal Jonwal	20,868	3.38	+3.03
Majority		60,652	9.79	+7.42
Turnout		619,696	50.32	−3.13
BJP hold		Swing	+3.24	

== See also ==
- Bhilwara district
- List of constituencies of the Lok Sabha
