= Shahpura =

Shahpura may refer to:

== India ==
- Shahapur (Thane), a town in Maharashtra
- Shahpura, Bhilwara, a town in Rajasthan
  - Shahpura, Bhilwara Assembly constituency
  - Shahpura State, a princely state during the British Raj
- Shahpura, Dindori, a town in Madhya Pradesh
  - Shahpura, Madhya Pradesh Assembly constituency, Dindori
- Shahpura, Jabalpur, a town in Madhya Pradesh
- Shahpura, Jaipur, a town in Rajasthan
  - Shahpura, Jaipur Assembly constituency
- Shahpura, Jangaon district, a village in Telangana
- Shahpura, Mainpuri, a village in Uttar Pradesh
- Shahpura, Shahpura district, a city in Rajasthan
  - Shahpura district, a district of Rajasthan
- Shahpura Lake, a lake of Bhopal, Madhya Padesh

== Bangladesh ==
- Shapuree Island, also spelled Shapura, at the mouth of the Naf River

== See also ==
- Shahpur (disambiguation)
- Shahpura Assembly constituency (disambiguation)
