= Rooplal Somani =

Indian politician

Member of Parliament, Lok Sabha
- In office 1977-1980
- Preceded by: Hemendra Singh Banera
- Succeeded by: Girdhari Lal Vyas
- Constituency: Bhilwara, Rajasthan.

Personal details
- Born: 13 November 1917
- Party: Janata Party
- Spouse: Sunder Devi Somani

Rooplal Somani was an Indian politician. He was elected to the Lok Sabha, the lower house of the Parliament of India from Bhilwara, Rajasthan as a member of the Janata Party.
