= Ram Kanwar Bairwa =

Indian politician

Member of Parliament, Lok Sabha
- In office 1971–1980
- Preceded by: Jamnalal Bairwa
- Succeeded by: Banwari Lal Bairwa
- Constituency: Tonk

Personal details
- Born: 15 September 1933
- Party: Janata Party
- Other political affiliations: Swatantra Party
- Spouse: Bhori Devi

Ram Kanwar Bairwa is an Indian politician. He was elected to the Lok Sabha, the lower house of the Parliament of India, from Tonk in Rajasthan, as a member of the Janata Party.
