= Gopal Pacherwal =

Indian politician

Member of Parliament, Lok Sabha
- In office 1989–1991
- Preceded by: Banwari Lal Bairwa
- Succeeded by: Ram Narain Bairwa
- Constituency: Tonk

Personal details
- Born: Gopal Pacherwal; 8 July 1948 (age 77) Keshoraipatan, Bundi district, Rajasthan
- Party: Bharatiya Janata Party
- Other political affiliations: Janata Party; Janata Dal; Samta Party; Janata Dal (United)
- Spouse: Mohor Bai
- Children: 6 sons and 2 Daughter

Gopal Pacherwal (born 8 July 1948) is an Indian politician and a member of the 9th Lok Sabha. He was elected to the Lok Sabha, lower house of the Parliament of India from Tonk in Rajasthan in the 1989 Indian general election as a member of the Janata Dal, defeating senior Indian National Congress leader Banwari Lal Bairwa. He was elected to the Rajasthan Legislative Assembly from Patan constituency in Rajasthan in the 1977 and 1980 Rajasthan Legislative Assembly election as a member of the Rashtriya Janata Dal.
