= Shyam Lal Bansiwal =

Indian politician

Member of Parliament, Lok Sabha
- In office 1999–2001
- Preceded by: Dowaraka Prasad Bairwa
- Succeeded by: Kailash Meghwal
- In office 1996-1998
- Preceded by: Ram Narain Bairwa
- Succeeded by: Dowaraka Prasad Bairwa
- Constituency: Tonk, Rajasthan

Personal details
- Born: 20 July 1947
- Died: 22 May 2001 (aged 53)
- Party: Bharatiya Janata Party

Shyam Lal Bansiwal was an Indian politician. He was elected to the Lok Sabha, the lower house of the Parliament of India from Tonk, Rajasthan as a member of the Bharatiya Janata Party.
