= Shahpura Assembly constituency =

Shahpura Assembly constituency might refer to one of these electoral constituencies in India:

- Shahpura, Bhilwara Assembly constituency, in Bhilwara district, Rajasthan
- Shahpura, Jaipur Assembly constituency, in Jaipur district, Rajasthan
- Shahpura, Madhya Pradesh Assembly constituency

== See also ==
- Shahpura (disambiguation)
