= Ladu Lal Pitliya =

Indian politician

Member of the 16th Rajasthan Legislative Assembly
- Incumbent
- Assumed office 3 December 2023
- Preceded by: Gayatri Devi Trivedi
- Constituency: Sahara
- Majority: 1,17,203 (61.76%)

Personal details
- Party: Bharatiya Janata Party
- Profession: Politician

Ladu Lal Pitliya is an Indian politician and member of the Bharatiya Janata Party. He is a member of the 16th Rajasthan Legislative Assembly from Sahara constituency in Bhilwara.

== Political career ==
Following the 2023 Rajasthan Legislative Assembly election, he was elected as an MLA from the Sahara constituency, defeating Rajendra Trivedi, the candidate from the Indian National Congress (INC), by a margin of 62,519 votes.
