= Nathdwara Assembly constituency =

Legislative Assembly constituency in Rajasthan State, India

Coordinates: 24.93°N 73.82°E

Nathdwara
- Constituency No. 176 for the Rajasthan Legislative Assembly

Constituency details
- Country: India
- Region: North India
- State: Rajasthan
- District: Rajsamand
- Lok Sabha constituency: Rajsamand
- Established: 2008
- Total electors: 238,585
- Reservation: None

Member of Legislative Assembly
- 16th Rajasthan Legislative Assembly
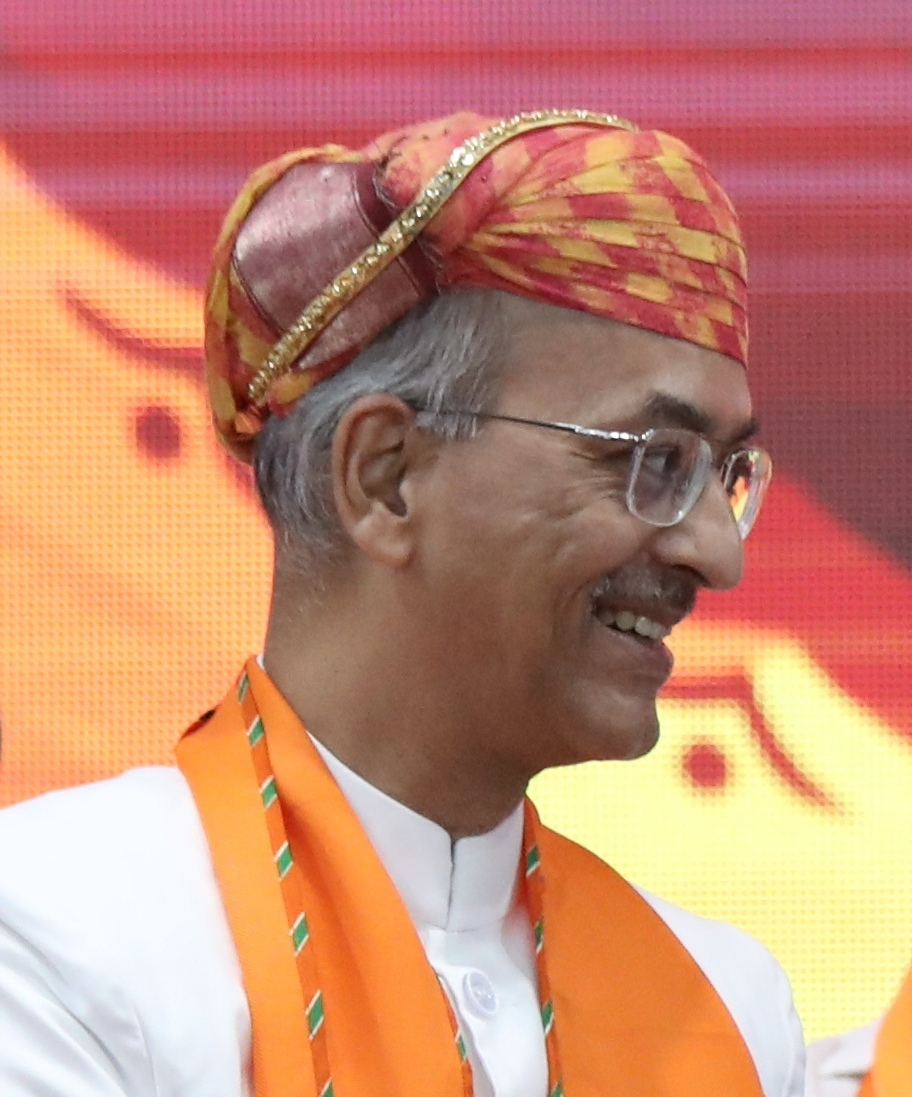
- Incumbent Vishvaraj Singh Mewar
- Party: Bharatiya Janata Party

Nathdwara Assembly constituency is one of the 200 Legislative Assembly constituencies of Rajasthan state in India.

It is part of Rajsamand district.

== Members of the Legislative Assembly ==
Election	Name	Party
1957	Master Kishan Lal Sharma	Indian National Congress
1962	Vije Singh	Bharatiya Jana Sangh
1967	Master Kishan Lal Sharma	Indian National Congress
1972	Manohar Kothari	Indian National Congress
1977	Navneet Kumar	Indian National Congress
1980	C. P. Joshi	Indian National Congress
1985	C. P. Joshi	Indian National Congress
1990	Shivdan Singh Chauhan	Bharatiya Janata Party
1993	Shivdan Singh Chauhan	Bharatiya Janata Party
1998	C. P. Joshi	Indian National Congress
2003	C. P. Joshi	Indian National Congress
2008	Kalyan Singh Chauhan	Bharatiya Janata Party
2013	Kalyan Singh Chauhan	Bharatiya Janata Party
2018	C. P. Joshi	Indian National Congress
2023	Vishvaraj Singh Mewar	Bharatiya Janata Party

== Election results ==

Rajasthan Legislative Assembly Election, 2023: Nathdwara
Party	Candidate	Votes	%	±%
BJP	Vishvaraj Singh Mewar	94,950	50.24	
INC	Dr. C. P. Joshi	87,446	46.27	
Majority		7,504	3.97	
Turnout		189,003	N/A	
BJP gain from INC		Swing		

Rajasthan Legislative Assembly Election, 2018: Nathdwara
Party	Candidate	Votes	%	±%
INC	C. P. Joshi	88,388	50.99	
BJP	Mahesh Pratap Singh	71,444	41.22	
NOTA	None of the Above	4248	2.45	
Majority				
Turnout				
INC gain from BJP		Swing		

=== 2023 ===
2023 Rajasthan Legislative Assembly election: Nathdwara
Party	Candidate	Votes	%	±%
BJP	Vishvaraj Singh Mewar	94,950	50.24	+9.02
INC	C. P. Joshi	87,446	46.27	−4.72
Independent	Jitendra Kumar Khatik	2,001	1.06	
BSP	Babulal Salvi	1,762	0.93	−0.36
NOTA	None of the above	2,163	1.14	−1.31
Majority		7,504	3.97	−5.8
Turnout		189,003	79.22	+2.83
BJP gain from INC		Swing		

=== 2018 ===
2018 Rajasthan Legislative Assembly election: Nathdwara
Party	Candidate	Votes	%	±%
INC	C. P. Joshi	88,384	50.99	
BJP	Mahesh Pratap Singh	71,444	41.22	
Independent	Laxmi Lal Mali	2,531	1.46	
BSP	Babu Lal Salvi	2,235	1.29	
CPI	Raghunandan	2,015	1.16	
NOTA	None of the above	4,248	2.45	
Majority		16,940	9.77	
Turnout		173,336	76.39	

=== 2008 ===
Rajasthan Legislative Assembly Election, 2008: Nathdwara
Party	Candidate	Votes	%	±%
BJP	Kalyan Singh Chouhan	62,216	50.00	
INC	C.P. Joshi	62,215	50.00	
Majority		1		
Turnout		124431		
BJP hold		Swing		

== See also ==
- List of constituencies of the Rajasthan Legislative Assembly
- Rajsamand district
