= Damodar Agarwal =

Indian politician

Member of Parliament, Lok Sabha
- Incumbent
- Assumed office 4 June 2024
- Preceded by: Subhash Baheria
- Constituency: Bhilwara

Personal details
- Party: Bharatiya Janata Party
- Relatives: Amit Agarwal (nephew)

Damodar Agarwal (Hindi pronunciation: [d̪aːmoːd̪əɾ əgɾəʋaːl]) is an Indian politician from Rajasthan. He represents Bharatiya Janata Party and is a member of the 18th Lok Sabha from Bhilwara Lok Sabha constituency.

== Education ==
Agarwal completed his B.Com and M.A. from the University of Rajasthan.

== Political career ==
Agarwal currently serves as the Member of Lok Sabha from the Bhilwara constituency. He was elected in the 2024 Indian general elections with a margin of 354,606 votes defeating his nearest rival candidate C. P. Joshi.

== See also ==
- 2024 Indian general election in Rajasthan
- List of NDA candidates for 2024 Indian general election
