= Sahara Assembly constituency =

Legislative Assembly constituency in Rajasthan State, India

Coordinates: 25.19°N 74.24°E

Sahara
- Constituency No. 179 for the Rajasthan Legislative Assembly

Constituency details
- Country: India
- Region: North India
- State: Rajasthan
- District: Bhilwara
- Lok Sabha constituency: Bhilwara
- Total electors: 254,268
- Reservation: None

Member of Legislative Assembly
- 16th Rajasthan Legislative Assembly
- Incumbent Ladu Lal Pitliya
- Party: Bharatiya Janata Party
- Elected year: 2023

Sahara Assembly constituency is one of the 200 Legislative Assembly constituencies of Rajasthan state in India.

It is part of Bhilwara district.

== Members of the Legislative Assembly ==
Year	Member	Party
2018	Kailash Chandra Trivedi	Indian National Congress
2021 (Bye-election)	Gayatri Devi Trivedi	Indian National Congress
2023	Ladu Lal Pitliya	Bharatiya Janata Party

== Election results ==
=== 2023 ===
2023 Rajasthan Legislative Assembly election: Sahara
Party	Candidate	Votes	%	±%
BJP	Ladu Lal Pitliya	117,203	61.76	+28.31
INC	Rajendra Trivedi	54,684	28.82	−8.64
RLP	Badrilal Jat	8,971	4.73	
CPI	Kailash Gehlot	4,125	2.17	+0.08
NOTA	None of the above	1,591	0.84	−0.91
Majority		62,519	32.94	+28.93
Turnout		189,771	74.63	+1.08
BJP gain from INC		Swing		

=== 2021 bypoll ===
A bye-election was needed due to the death of the sitting MLA, Kailash Chandra Trivedi, in October 2020.

Bye-election, 2021: Sahara
Party	Candidate	Votes	%	±%
INC	Gayatri Devi Trivedi	81,700	58.21	
BJP	Dr. Ratanlal Jat	39,500	28.14	
RLP	Badri Lal Jat	12,231	8.71	
RRP	Ishwar Choudhary	701	0.5	
NOTA	None of the above	4,108	2.93	
Majority		42,200	30.07	
Turnout		1,40,368	56.76	
INC hold		Swing		

=== 2018 ===
2018 Rajasthan Legislative Assembly election: Sahara
Party	Candidate	Votes	%	±%
INC	Kailash Chandra Trivedi	65,420	37.46	
BJP	Roop Lal Jat	58,414	33.45	
Independent	Ladu Lal Pitlia	30,573	17.51	
Independent	Bhagwati Lal	5,101	2.92	
CPI	Kailash Gehlot	3,642	2.09	
Independent	Hiralal Kharol	2,478	1.42	
BSP	Govind Kumar Bairwa	2,231	1.28	
Independent	Rameshwar Lal Joshi	1,740	1.0	
NOTA	None of the above	3,055	1.75	
Majority		7,006	4.01	
Turnout		174,621	73.55	
INC gain from BJP		Swing		

=== 2013 ===
2013 Rajasthan Legislative Assembly election: Sahara
Party	Candidate	Votes	%	±%
BJP	Dr Balu Ram Chaudhary	82,470	51.32	
INC	Kailash Chandra Trivedi	61,714	38.40	
NOTA	None of the above	3,718	2.31	
CPI	Kailash Gehlot	3,210	2.00	
Majority		20,756	13.22	
Turnout		1,60,731	77.23	
BJP gain from INC		Swing		

== See also ==
- List of constituencies of the Rajasthan Legislative Assembly
- Bhilwara district
