= Rampal Upadhyay =

Indian politician

Member of Parliament, Lok Sabha
- In office 1998-1999
- Preceded by: Subhash Chandra Baheria
- Succeeded by: Vijayendrapal Singh
- Constituency: Bhilwara, Rajasthan.

Personal details
- Born: 24 July 1935
- Died: 17 August 2001 (aged 66)
- Party: Indian National Congress
- Spouse: Kamala Devi Upadhyay

Rampal Upadhyay is an Indian politician. He was elected to the Lok Sabha, the lower house of the Parliament of India from Bhilwara, Rajasthan, as a member of the Indian National Congress.
