= Tonk Lok Sabha constituency =

Constituency of the Indian parliament in Rajasthan

Coordinates: 26.2°N 75.8°E

Tonk
- Former Lok Sabha constituency

Constituency details
- Country: India
- Region: North India
- State: Rajasthan
- Established: 1952
- Abolished: 2008

Tonk was a Lok Sabha constituency in Rajasthan state in India. It was abolished following the delimitation of parliamentary constituencies in 2008.

== Members of Parliament ==
Year	Member	Party
1952	Manikya Lal Varma	Indian National Congress
1957	Heera Lal Shastri	Indian National Congress
1962	Jamnalal Bairwa	Swatantra Party
1967	Jamnalal Bairwa	Swatantra Party
1971	Ram Kanwar Bairwa	Swatantra Party
1977	Ram Kanwar Bairwa	Swatantra Party
1980	Banwari Lal Bairwa	Indian National Congress
1984	Banwari Lal Bairwa	Indian National Congress
1989	Gopal Pacherwal	Janata Dal
1991	Ram Narain Bairwa	Bharatiya Janata Party
1996	Shyam Lal Bansiwal	Bharatiya Janata Party
1998	Dowaraka Prasad Bairwa	Indian National Congress
1999	Shyam Lal Bansiwal	Bharatiya Janata Party
2001*	Kailash Meghwal	Bharatiya Janata Party
2004	Kailash Meghwal	Bharatiya Janata Party
From 2004: Constituency did not exist See : Tonk–Sawai Madhopur Lok Sabha constituency

*(By-election)

== Election results ==
=== 2004 ===
2004 Indian general elections: Tonk
Party	Candidate	Votes	%	±%
BJP	Kailash Meghwal	315,717	53.12	−0.13
INC	Nand Kishore Bairwa	257,205	43.27	−1.02
BSP	Ram Babu Raiger	21,436	3.61	+2.51
Majority		58,512	9.85	−0.11
Turnout		594,358	46.52	−1.48
BJP hold		Swing	-0.13	

== See also ==
- List of former constituencies of the Lok Sabha
- Tonk district
- Tonk-Sawai Madhopur (Lok Sabha constituency)
