= Kailash Chandra Trivedi =

Indian politician (died 2020)

Kailash Chandra Trivedi (died 7 October 2020) was an Indian politician who served as a member of the Rajasthan Legislative Assembly from 2003 to 2013, representing Sahara, and again from 2018 till his death during the COVID-19 pandemic in India. In a 2021 by-election, his wife, Gayatri Devi Trivedi, won his vacated seat as an Indian National Congress candidate.
