= Bhilwara Assembly constituency =

Constituency of the Rajasthan Legislative Assembly in India

Coordinates: 25.35°N 74.63°E

Bhilwara
- Constituency No. 180 for the Rajasthan Legislative Assembly

Constituency details
- Country: India
- Region: North India
- State: Rajasthan
- District: Bhilwara
- Lok Sabha constituency: Bhilwara
- Established: 1951
- Total electors: 279,899
- Reservation: None

Member of Legislative Assembly
- 16th Rajasthan Legislative Assembly
- Incumbent Ashok Kumar Kothari
- Party: BJP
- Elected year: 2023

Bhilwara Assembly constituency is one of the 200 Legislative Assembly constituencies of Rajasthan state in India. It is in Bhilwara district and Bhilwara Lok Sabha Constituency.

== Member of Legislative Assembly ==
Year	Member	Party
1951	Tej Mal	Indian National Congress
1957	Kamla Bai	Indian National Congress
1962	Nirmala Devi	Indian National Congress
1967	R.P. Lacha	Indian National Congress
1972	Bhauwat Lal Bhadada	Indian National Congress
1977	Kaushal Kishore Jain	Janata Party
1980	Bansilal Patwa	Bharatiya Janata Party
1985	Pranvir	Indian National Congress
1990	Bansilal Patwa	Bharatiya Janata Party
1993	Jagdish Chandra Darak	Bharatiya Janata Party
1998	Ramrichpal Nuwal	Bharatiya Janata Party
1998	Devendra Singh	Indian National Congress
2003	Subhash Chandra Baheria	Bharatiya Janata Party
2008	Vitthal Shankar Avasthi	Bharatiya Janata Party
2013	Vitthal Shankar Avasthi	Bharatiya Janata Party
2018	Vitthal Shankar Avasthi	Bharatiya Janata Party
2023	Ashok Kumar Kothari	Independent politician (Note: Joined BJP in September 2024.)

== Election results ==
=== 2023 ===
Rajasthan Legislative Assembly Election, 2023: Bhilwara
Party	Candidate	Votes	%	±%
Independent	Ashok Kumar Kothari	70,095	36.68	
INC	Om Prakash Naraniwal	59,317	31.04	+20.22
BJP	Vitthal Shankar Awasthi	55,625	29.11	−24.12
SDPI	Abdul Rajjak Ansari	2,309	1.21	−3.63
NOTA	None of the above	1,257	0.66	−0.02
Majority		10,778	5.64	−22.68
Turnout		191,087	68.27	−0.04
Independent gain from BJP		Swing		

=== 2018 ===
Rajasthan Legislative Assembly Election, 2018: Bhilwara
Party	Candidate	Votes	%	±%
BJP	Vitthal Shankar Avasthi	93,198	53.23	
Independent	Om Prakash Naraniwal	43,620	24.91	
INC	Anil Dangi	18,941	10.82	
SDPI	Abdul Salam Ansari	8,468	4.84	
Independent	Jaspal Singh Bhati	3,762	2.15	
NOTA	None of the above	1,198	0.68	
Majority		49,578	28.32	
Turnout		175,079	68.31	

== See also ==
- List of constituencies of the Rajasthan Legislative Assembly
- Bhilwara district
