= Subhash Chandra Baheria =

Indian politician (born 1956)

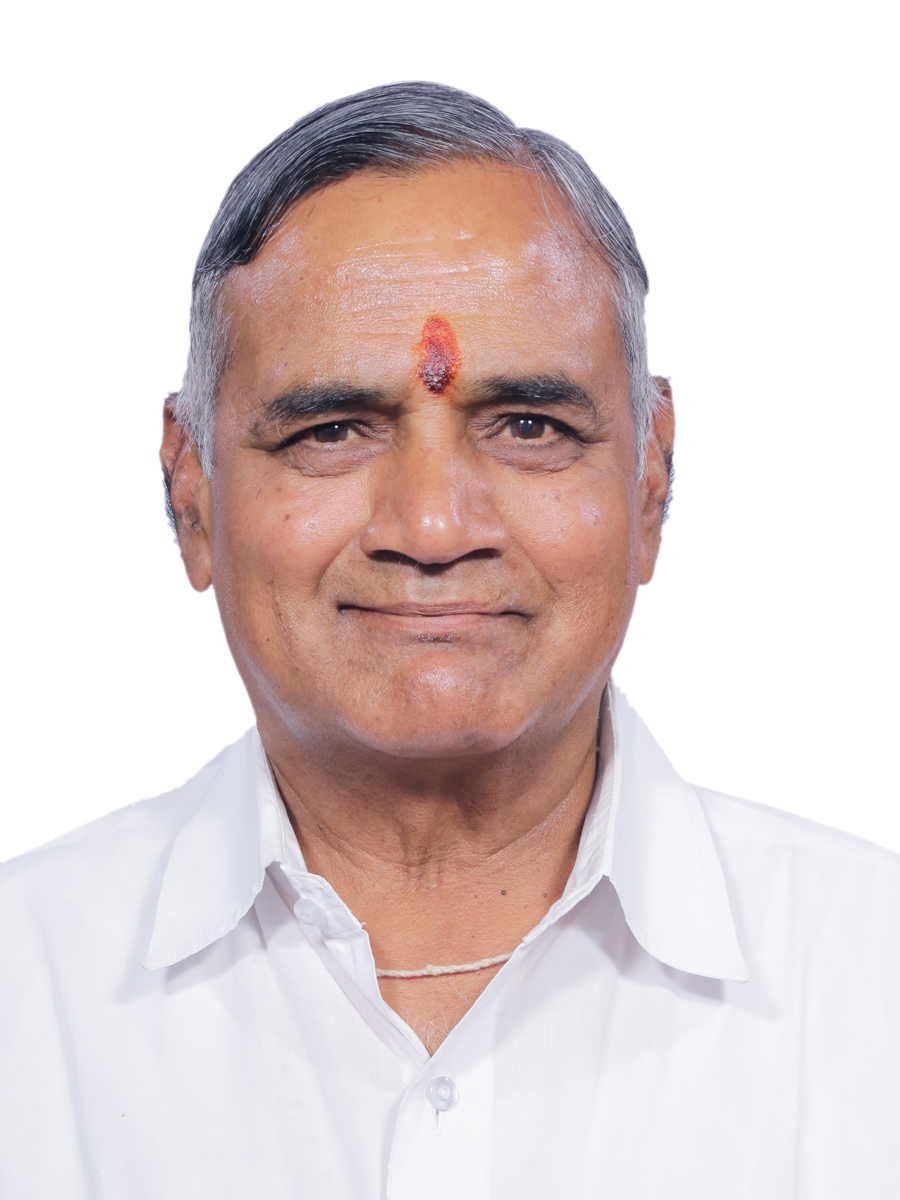

Member of Parliament, Lok Sabha
- In office 2014–2024
- Preceded by: C. P. Joshi
- Succeeded by: Damodar Agarwal
- Constituency: Bhilwara

Member of the Rajasthan Legislative Assembly
- In office 2003–2008
- Constituency: Bhilwara

Member of the Lok Sabha
- In office 1996–1998
- Constituency: Bhilwara

Personal details
- Born: 17 December 1956 (age 69) Shahpura, Rajasthan, India
- Party: Bharatiya Janata Party
- Children: 3
- Education: Chartered Accountancy; B.Com.
- Occupation: Politician, industrialist

Subhash Chandra Baheria is an Indian politician and former Member of Parliament who represented Bhilwara in the Lok Sabha from 1996 to 1998 and from 2014 to 2024 as a member of the Bharatiya Janata Party. He was also a member of the Rajasthan Legislative Assembly from the Bhilwara constituency from 2003 to 2008. He is a chartered accountant and holds a Bachelor of Commerce degree from Government College, Shahpura.

== Early life and education ==
Baheria was born on 17 December 1956 in Shahpura, in Bhilwara district of Rajasthan. He earned a B.Com. degree from Government College, Shahpura, in 1976 and qualified as a chartered accountant through the Institute of Chartered Accountants of India in 1983.

Baheria has been associated with the Rashtriya Swayamsevak Sangh (RSS) and has been involved in social work. A 2019 profile in Hindustan Times described him as maintaining a low-profile public image and having easy access to people in the area.

== Business career ==
Baheria has worked in the textile industry in Bhilwara. He founded Swastika Suitings, a textile company associated with the city's textile industry. He has also served as a director of Swastika Threads Private Limited and Sona Textiles Private Limited. He was a director of Swastika Suitings Private Limited from 1986 until 2017.

== Political career ==
Baheria was elected to the 11th Lok Sabha from Bhilwara in the 1996 Indian general election as a candidate of the Bharatiya Janata Party. He contested the 1998 Indian general election from Bhilwara but was defeated by Rampal Upadhyay of the Indian National Congress.

In the 2003 Rajasthan Legislative Assembly election, Baheria was elected to the Rajasthan Legislative Assembly from the Bhilwara constituency and served until 2008.

Baheria returned to the Lok Sabha in the 2014 Indian general election, winning the Bhilwara constituency with 630,317 votes and a margin of 246,264 votes over Ashok Chandna of the Indian National Congress.

He was re-elected from Bhilwara in the 2019 Indian general election. He received 938,160 votes and defeated Indian National Congress candidate Ram Pal Sharma by 612,000 votes. The margin was the largest recorded in Rajasthan in that election.

During the 17th Lok Sabha, Baheria served on the Public Accounts Committee and the Standing Committee on Finance. He was also a member of the Standing Committee on Labour, Textiles and Skill Development during the 17th Lok Sabha.

In 2017, he was appointed to the Joint Committee on the Financial Resolution and Deposit Insurance Bill, 2017.

In January 2023, Baheria participated in an industry discussion at the Indian Institute of Management Ahmedabad on the role of textiles in India's goal of becoming a $5 trillion economy.

== Electoral performance ==
Electoral performance
Year	Constituency	Party	Result	Votes	Margin
1996	Bhilwara	Bharatiya Janata Party	Won	212,731	17,209
1998	Bhilwara	Bharatiya Janata Party	Lost	276,963	Lost to Rampal Upadhyay
2014	Bhilwara	Bharatiya Janata Party	Won	630,317	246,264
2019	Bhilwara	Bharatiya Janata Party	Won	938,160	612,000

== Contributions to Bhilwara ==
In a 2019 interview, Baheria identified the completion of the Chambal drinking-water project, the opening of Bhilwara Medical College and the electrification of railway lines as achievements during his tenure. He also cited the establishment of a passport office in Bhilwara, the opening of more than 700,000 accounts under the Pradhan Mantri Jeevan Jyoti Bima Yojana, the establishment of new branches of polytechnic colleges, and increased compensation for land acquired for national highway projects.

== Personal life ==
Baheria has three children. His wife, Ranjana Baheria, is a homemaker.

== See also ==
- Politics of India
- Parliament of India
- Government of India
