= Dheeraj Gurjar =

Indian politician

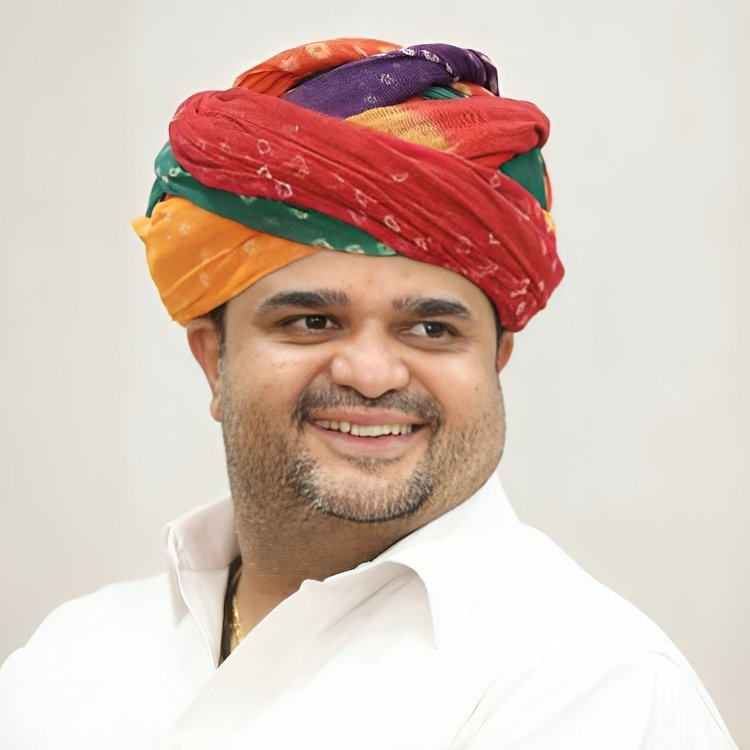

Member of Rajasthan Legislative Assembly
- In office 2013–2018
- Preceded by: Shivji Ram Meena
- Succeeded by: Gopichand Meena
- Constituency: Jahazpur

Personal details
- Born: 15 August 1978 (age 48) Jahazpur, Rajasthan, India
- Party: Indian National Congress
- Spouse: Hemlata Gurjar (wife)
- Parent: Udai Lal Gurjar (Father)
- Education: B.Com.
- Occupation: politician
- Website: www.inc.in

Dheeraj Gurjar is an Indian politician, belonging to the Indian National Congress. He serves as an All India Congress Committee National Secretary, Co-Incharge of the All India Congress Committee for Uttar Pradesh, Member of the Rajasthan Legislative Assembly 2013-2018 from the Jahazpur Assembly constituency and Rajasthan Pradesh Congress Committee general secretary. He got appointed the Chairman Of State Seeds Corporation Of Rajasthan in February 2022.
