= Ramesh Chandra Vyas =

Indian politician

Member of Parliament, Lok Sabha
- In office 1957–1962
- Preceded by: Hari Ram Nathany
- Succeeded by: K. L. Shrimali
- In office 1967-1971
- Preceded by: K. L. Shrimali
- Succeeded by: L. M. Singhvi
- Constituency: Bhilwara, Rajasthan.

Personal details
- Born: 1918
- Party: Indian National Congress
- Spouse: Rama Devi

Ramesh Chandra Vyas was an Indian politician. He was elected to the Lok Sabha, the lower house of the Parliament of India from Bhilwara, Rajasthan as a member of the Indian National Congress.
