= Girdhari Lal Vyas =

Indian politician

Member of Parliament, Lok Sabha
- In office 1980–1989
- Preceded by: Rooplal Somani
- Succeeded by: Hemendra Singh Banera
- Constituency: Bhilwara, Rajasthan.

Personal details
- Party: Indian National Congress

Girdhari Lal Vyas was an Indian politician. He was elected to the Lok Sabha, the lower house of the Parliament of India from Bhilwara, Rajasthan as a member of the Indian National Congress.
