= Gayatri Devi Trivedi =

Indian politician

Member of the Rajasthan Legislative Assembly
- In office May 2021 – December 2023
- Preceded by: Late Kailash Chandra Trivedi
- Constituency: Sahara

Personal details
- Born: 15 July 1957 (age 68) Village Pur, Bhilwara district, Rajasthan
- Party: Indian National Congress
- Spouse: Kailash Chandra Trivedi
- Parent: Kanhaiya Lal Chaturvedi (father)
- Occupation: Politician

Gayatri Devi Trivedi is an Indian politician from Indian National Congress and member of the Rajasthan Legislative Assembly. She is widow of Late Kailash Chandra Trivedi, former MLA Sahara. She was elected as an MLA from Sahara Constituency in 2021 bypolls.
