= C. P. Joshi =

Indian politician

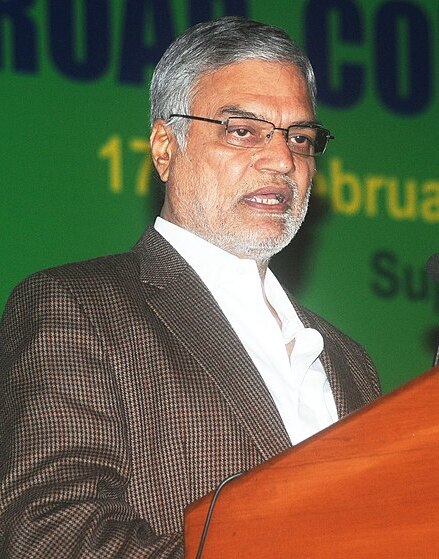
- Official Portrait

Speaker of the Rajasthan Legislative Assembly
- In office 16 January 2019 – 20 December 2023
- Governor: Kalyan Singh; Kalraj Mishra
- Chief Minister: Ashok Gehlot
- Preceded by: Kailash Chandra Meghwal
- Succeeded by: Vasudev Devnani

Minister of Road Transport and Highways
- In office 19 January 2011 – 16 June 2013
- Prime Minister: Manmohan Singh
- Preceded by: Kamal Nath
- Succeeded by: Oscar Fernandes

Minister of Railways
- In office 11 May 2013 – 16 June 2013
- Preceded by: Pawan Kumar Bansal
- Succeeded by: Mallikarjun Kharge
- In office 22 September 2012 – 28 October 2012
- Preceded by: Mukul Roy
- Succeeded by: Pawan Kumar Bansal

Minister of Rural Development and Panchayati Raj
- In office 22 May 2009 – 18 January 2011
- Preceded by: Mani Shankar Aiyar
- Succeeded by: Vilasrao Deshmukh

Member of Parliament Lok Sabha
- In office 16 May 2009 – 16 May 2014
- Preceded by: Vijayendrapal Singh
- Succeeded by: Subhash Chandra Baheria
- Constituency: Bhilwara

Cabinet Minister of Rajasthan Government
- In office 7 December 1998 – 4 December 2003
- Departments: Education, Rural Development and Panchayati Raj, Ground Water, Public Health Engineering, Science and Technology.
- Chief Minister: Ashok Gehlot

Member of the Rajasthan Legislative Assembly
- In office 2018 – 3 December 2023
- Preceded by: Kalyan Singh Chouhan
- Succeeded by: Vishvaraj Singh Mewar
- Constituency: Nathdwara
- In office 1998–2008
- Preceded by: Shiv Dan Singh Chauhan
- Succeeded by: Kalyan Singh Chouhan
- Constituency: Nathdwara
- In office 1980–1990
- Preceded by: Navneet Kumar
- Succeeded by: Shiv Dan Singh Chauhan
- Constituency: Nathdwara

Personal details
- Born: 29 July 1950 (age 75) Nathdwara, Rajasthan, India
- Party: Indian National Congress
- Profession: Professor of Psychology
- Website: cpjoshi.com

C. P. Joshi (born 29 July 1950) is an Indian politician and a five-time MLA from Nathdwara, Rajasthan. He was born in a Brahmin family in Nathdwara, Rajasthan and he is a member of the Indian National Congress. He has previously served as Speaker of the Rajasthan Legislative Assembly. Previously, he was the Member of Parliament of India from Bhilwara in the 15th Lok Sabha. He was one of the first 19 members of India's new cabinet sworn in on 22 May 2009, despite being a first-time member of the Lok Sabha. As a union minister, Joshi held key portfolios like Road Transport and Highways, and Rural Development and Panchayati Raj in the Second Manmohan Singh ministry. Moreover, he was also a Cabinet Minister of the Government of Rajasthan from 1998 to 2003.

He lost Nathdwara constituency against Vishvaraj Singh Mewar, a great descendant of Maharana Pratap family for Rajasthan Legislative Assembly.

== Educational background ==
Joshi completed his primary and higher secondary education at his birthplace Nathdwara, Rajasthan. He finished his graduation from University College of Social Sciences & Humanities, Udaipur with a B.A. in Law, and completed his Masters and Ph.D. degrees in Psychology. He began his academic career as a lecturer at the University College of Social Sciences & Humanities, Udaipur. Before entering full time politics, Joshi was a Professor of Psychology at Udaipur's Mohanlal Sukhadia University, with a specialisation in Intelligence Quotient.

== Political career ==
Mohan Lal Sukhadia, founder of modern Mewar, recognised Joshi's social commitments and encouraged him to actively participate in politics. He was elected as Student Union President for Mohanlal Sukhadia University in 1973. He was first elected as MLA from Nathdwara in 1980. He went on winning the assembly elections from Nathdwara in 1985, 1998, 2003 and 2018. He is a five-time MLA from Nathdwara and one-time MP from Bhilwara.

In 1998, he became the Cabinet Minister for Rajasthan handling key portfolios like Education, Rural Development and Panchayati Raj, Public Health Engineering, Policy Planning, and Information Technology. He gave a new direction to the significant departments of Abhiyantrik Yojna, Panchayati Raj and Education and made his distinguished presence in these fields.

In 2003, as an opposition MLA in Rajasthan Legislative Assembly, he was appointed the president of Rajasthan Pradesh Congress Committee. He brought the state unit together to win the 2008 Rajasthan Legislative Assembly election only to lose his own seat by one vote, to Bharatiya Janata Party candidate Kalyan Singh Chauhan. He is the second person in the Indian election history to lose an assembly election by one vote. The first candidate to lose by a single vote was A. R. Krishnamurthy against R. Dhruvanarayana at the Santhemarahalli constituency of Karnataka during 2004 assembly elections. He was a prominent contender for Chief Minister of Rajasthan post in 2008 Rajasthan Legislative Assembly election victory, but he lost his own seat Nathdwara.

After 2009 Indian general election, he was appointed a Cabinet Minister in the Second Manmohan Singh ministry on 22 May 2009. From 2009 to 2011, he was the Minister of Rural Development and Panchayati Raj and from 2011 to 2013, he was the Minister of Road Transport and Highways. In 2012, after Mamata Banerjee went out of UPA and Mukul Roy resigned as Railways Minister, CP Joshi got extra charge of Railways Ministry. He resigned from the Cabinet on 16 June 2013 after serving for more than four years to take the charge of General Secretary in All India Congress Committee (AICC). He continued as the General Secretary of All India Congress Committee from 2013 to 2018. He unsuccessfully contested the 2014 Lok Sabha elections from Jaipur (Rural) seat.

After the 2018 Rajasthan Legislative Assembly election, Indian National Congress formed the government in Rajasthan under the leadership of Ashok Gehlot and Sachin Pilot. On 16 January 2019, Joshi was unanimously appointed the Speaker of the Rajasthan Legislative Assembly.

== Cricket administration ==
Joshi has also dabbled in cricket administration. He is a two-time president of Rajasthan Cricket Association (RCA). In 2009, he contested against former IPL commissioner Lalit Modi and became the president of RCA for the first time. Again in 2017, he defeated Lalit Modi's son Ruchir Modi and became RCA president for the second time. Vaibhav Gehlot, son of Rajasthan chief minister Ashok Gehlot, succeeded C.P. Joshi as the president of RCA in October 2019. The newly elected executive committee appointed Joshi as the 'chief patron' of Rajasthan Cricket Association and president Vaibhav Gehlot said he will work under the guidance of Joshi.

Political offices
Preceded by Kamal Nath	Minister of Road Transport and Highways; 19 January 2011–16 June 2013	Succeeded by Oscar Fernandes
Preceded by Raghuvansh Prasad Singh	Minister of Rural Development; 22 May 2009 – 18 January 2011	Succeeded by Vilasrao Deshmukh
Preceded by Mani Shankar Aiyar	Minister of Panchayati Raj; 22 May 2009 – 18 January 2011	Succeeded by Vilasrao Deshmukh
Preceded by Pawan Kumar Bansal	Minister of Railways; 11 May 2013 – 16 June 2013	Succeeded by Mallikarjun Kharge
Preceded by Kailash Chandra Meghwal	Speaker of Rajasthan Legislative Assembly; 16 January 2019–23 December 2023	Succeeded by Vasudev Devnani
