= Kacholiya =

Coordinates: 25°15′N 74°41′E

Kacholiya Kacholia
- village
- Kacholiya garh (fort)
- Interactive map of Kacholiya
- Country: India
- District: Tonk

Government
  - Body: Gram panchayat

Languages
- Time zone: UTC+5:30 (IST)
- ISO 3166 code: RJ-IN

Kacholiya is a small village located in Tonk district, Rajasthan, India. It is located in the Malpura mandal.

== History ==
Kacholiya was given to Krishna ji bhada by jaipur ruler .Krishna ji bhada came from Srinagar (Ajmer).Man Singh ruler of jaipur gave this village to Krishna bhada. Krishna ji had two son and his elder son Ajjo ji bhada got Lasadiya village near Kerri by Mugal emperor Akbar

== Population ==
The population of Kacholiya was 1495 in the 2001 census of India, with a male population of 751 and a female population of 744.

== Culture ==
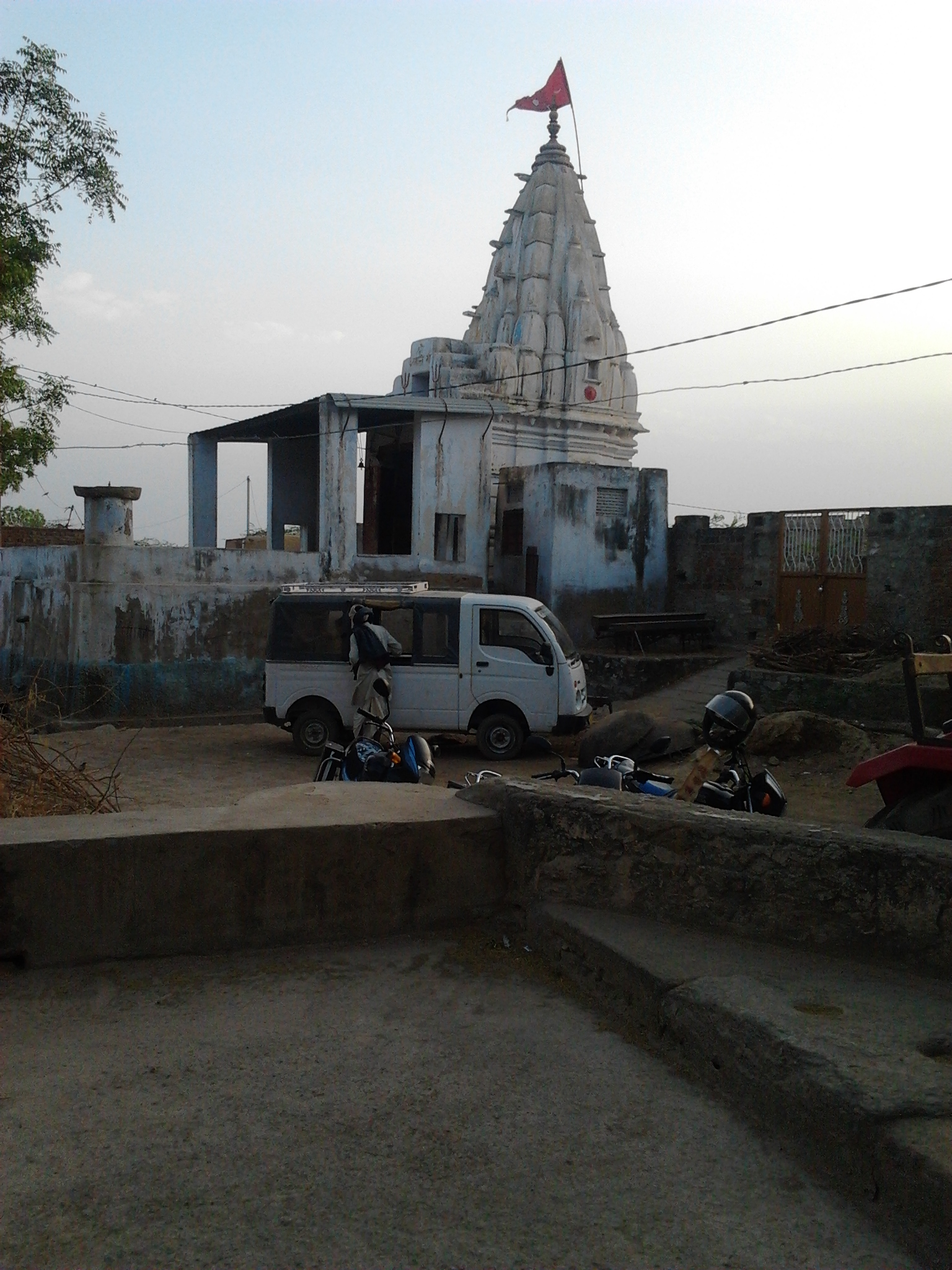
Jayanti Mata (Kali) temple

Kacholiya panchayat has five villages: Sotwara, Sans, Darawat, Amarpura and Kacholiya. The main occupation is agriculture, followed by government service. The nearest post office is Lamba Harisingh (PIN code 304503).

The village has a secondary school.

== Transport ==
Kacholiya is connected by road to Malpura to the East and Lamba Harisingh to the West. Private and r.s.r.t.c buses run daily from Malpura, but there is still a lack of connectivity.

Kacholiya police station is at Pachewar 15 km away at Malpura-Dudu Road. Sindholiya mata temple is 5 km near from it.
