= Lalaram Bairwa =

Indian politician

- लालाराम बैरवा

Member of the Rajasthan Legislative Assembly
- Incumbent
- Assumed office 3 December 2023
- Preceded by: Kailash Chandra Meghwal
- Constituency: Shahpura, Bhilwara

Personal details
- Born: 18 December 1972 (age 53)
- Party: Bharatiya Janata Party
- Spouse: Anju Devi Banshiwal
- Children: 2
- Parent: Ram Nath Bairwa (Father)
- Education: B.A. & C.P.e.D.
- Alma mater: Maharshi Dayanand Saraswati University
- Occupation: Politician
- Profession: Self-employed
- Website: official website

Lalaram Bairwa (18 December 1972) is an Indian politician who is currently serving as a member of the legislative assembly (MLA) for the constituency of Shahpura, Bhilwara in the 16th Rajasthan Legislative Assembly. He is a member of the Bhartiya Janta Party.

== Career ==
Following the 2023 Rajasthan Legislative Assembly election, Bairwa was elected as an MLA for the Shahpura constituency. He defeated Narendra Kumar Regar, the candidate from the Indian National Congress (INC), by a margin of 59,298 votes.
