= Hari Ram Nathany =

Indian politician and businessman

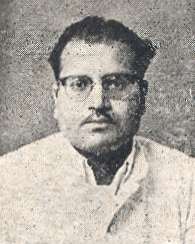
Hari Ram Nathany in 1952

Hari Ram Nathany was an Indian politician and businessman. He represented the Akhil Bharatiya Ram Rajya Parishad in the 1st Lok Sabha (lower house of the parliament of India) elected in 1952.

== Private life ==
Hailing from a Marwari family, Nathany was born in Calcutta as the son of Rameshwar Nathany. His father was a businessman. He was educated privately, and worked as a businessman. He married Gita Devi Nathany, and the couple had three children (two sons Krishna Kumar Nathay and Yogendra Kumar Nathany and one daughter Asha Nathany married to Shri Haridhyan Chandgothia in Mumbai). He settled in Bhilwara, Rajasthan. As of 1948 he was named honourable treasurer of the Shri Gandhi Memorial Fund in Bhilwara. In 1951 he was named President of the Sapt Shatabadi Maha Sati Mela in Chittorgarh Fort.

As per the Lok Sabha biography, Nathany's hobbies and interests included gardening, poetry, photography, music and tennis. He was a member of the Shri Bhopal Club in Bhilwara.

== Business ==
The Nathany family was prominent in business (Hari Ram's grandfather had co-founded the Calcutta Stock Exchange). Hari Ram Nathany worked with the family company Duduwala & Co was dealing with mica in Calcutta, maintaining mining activities in Bhilwara. Nathany was also served as one of the directors of the Citizens of India Mutual Insurance Co. in Calcutta (his brother was the chairman of the company). The family also owned several mills.

== Parliamentarian ==
In politics, he became a member of the Hindu nationalist Akhil Bharatiya Ram Rajya Parishad in 1951. He served as a member of the Working Committee of the party, as well as the Working Committee of its Rajasthan branch.

In 1952, Nathany was elected to the first Lok Sabha from the Bhilwara constituency. He obtained 51,562 votes (47.37%). Nathany was one of three Akhil Bharatiya Ram Rajya Parishad members in the first Lok Sabha, all elected from constituencies in Rajasthan. In parliament, he opposed the trade policies of the Indian National Congress government.

== Later life ==
After his tenure in parliament 1952-1957, Nathany remainder active in mining business.

Nathany died in Bhilwara on 24 March 1984 at the age of 60.
