= Jahazpur Assembly constituency =

Constituency of the Rajasthan legislative assembly in India

Coordinates: 25.62°N 75.28°E

Jahazpur
- Constituency No. 182 for the Rajasthan Legislative Assembly

Constituency details
- Country: India
- Region: North India
- State: Rajasthan
- District: Bhilwara
- Established: 1993
- Reservation: None

Member of Legislative Assembly
- 16th Rajasthan Legislative Assembly
- Incumbent Gopichand Meena
- Party: BJP
- Elected year: 2018

Jahazpur Assembly constituency is one of the 200 Rajasthan Legislative Assembly constituencies, of Rajasthan, in northern India. It is centered around the city of Jahazpur, in Bhilwara district. It is part of Bhilwara Lok Sabha constituency.

== Members of the Legislative Assembly ==
Year	Member	Party
1951	Ram Dayal	Independent
1957	Constituency did not exist	
1962	Ram Prasad Ladha	Indian National Congress
1967	Kalyan Mal Meena	Indian National Congress
1972	Mool Chand Meena	Indian National Congress
1977	Trilok Chand	Janata Party
1980	Ratan Lal Tambi	Independent
1985	Ratan Lal Tambi	Indian National Congress
1990	Shivji Ram Meena	Janata Dal
1993	Ratan Lal Tambi	Independent
1998	Ratan Lal Tambi	Indian National Congress
2003	Shivji Ram Meena	Bharatiya Janata Party
2008	Shivji Ram Meena	Bharatiya Janata Party
2013	Dheeraj Gurjar	Indian National Congress
2018	Gopichand Meena	Bharatiya Janata Party
2023	Gopichand Meena	Bharatiya Janata Party

== Election results ==
=== 2023 ===
2023 Rajasthan Legislative Assembly election: Jahazpur
Party	Candidate	Votes	%	±%
BJP	Gopichand Meena	96,933	48.35	−3.3
INC	Dheeraj Gurjar	96,353	48.06	+3.62
NOTA	None of the above	2,542	1.27	−0.35
Majority		580	0.29	−6.92
Turnout		200,485	80.88	+0.98
BJP hold		Swing		

=== 2018 ===
Rajasthan Legislative Assembly Election, 2018: Jahazpur
Party	Candidate	Votes	%	±%
BJP	Gopichand Meena	94,970	51.65	
INC	Dheeraj Gurjar	81,717	44.44	
NOTA	None of the above	2,984	1.62	
Majority		13,253	7.21	
Turnout		183,879	79.9	
