= Kotri Dhaylan =

Village in Rajasthan, India

- Village
- Location within Rajasthan Location within India
- Coordinates: 27°20′40″N 75°30′45″E

Government
  - Type: Federal republic
  - Body: Gram panchayat

Area
  - Total: 928 ha (2,290 acres)
- Elevation: 503 m (1,650 ft)

Population
  - Total: 3,815

Languages
  - Official: Hindi, Rajasthani, English
- Time zone: UTC+5:30 (IST)
- PIN: 332404
- Telephone code: 91 - 01575
- Vehicle registration: RJ-23

Kotri Dhaylan is a village in the Reengus tehsil in the Indian state of Rajasthan. It is known for having a high amount of doctors, with 48.5 doctors per 1000 people.

== History ==
Many villages in the Shekhawati are known for their tradition of military service, whereas Kotri Dhaylan has become recognized for its emphasis on education, particularly in medicine. According to Dainik Bhaskar (2022) and NDTV Rajasthan (2025), the village has produced more than 100 medical doctors.

The Dainik Bhaskar report states that Kotri Dhaylan has about 1,078 families and, if all doctors were present simultaneously, the ratio would be around 48.5 doctors per 1,000 residents, higher than the national average. The village’s first doctor, Dr. Pushkar Dhayal, graduated in 1968, and his success encouraged subsequent generations to pursue medicine.

== Demographics ==
As of 2011 the population was 3,815 – 2,015 men and 1,800 women. As of 2011, the literacy rate of the village was 72.09%, compared to 66.11% across the state. The male literacy rate was at 87.51%, while the female literacy rate was at 54.92%.
