= Vitthal Shankar Avasthi =

Indian politician

Member of the Rajasthan Legislative Assembly
- In office 2008–2023
- Constituency: Bhilwara

Personal details
- Born: Bhilwara, Rajasthan
- Party: Bharatiya Janata Party
- Occupation: Politician

Vitthal Shankar Avasthi is an Indian politician from the Bharatiya Janata Party. He was elected to the Rajasthan Legislative Assembly from Bhilwara for three terms between 2008 and 2023.
