= Kalyan Singh Chauhan =

Indian politician

Kalyan Singh Chauhan (18 November 1959 – 21 February 2018) was an Indian politician.

He began his political career in 1988 as a member of the Indian National Congress, and served as the sarpanch of Kotharia gram panchayat. Between 1998 and 2000, Chauhan was Khamnor Pradhan. In 2000, he became Up-Zila Pramukh, stepping down in 2005. Chauhan joined the Bharatiya Janata Party and faced C. P. Joshi in the Rajasthan Legislative Assembly election of 2008, winning by a single vote. Chauhan represented Nathdwara until his death from cancer on 21 February 2018, at GBH American Hospital in Udaipur. His funeral was held the same day. Chauhan died less than a year before the next assembly elections, and, by law, his seat did not need to be filled via by-election.
