= Hemendra Singh Banera =

Indian politician (1946–2021)

Member of Parliament, Lok Sabha
- In office 1971-1977
- Preceded by: Ramesh Chandra Vyas
- Succeeded by: Rooplal Somani
- In office 1989-1991
- Preceded by: Girdhari Lal Vyas
- Succeeded by: Shiv Charan Mathur
- Constituency: Bhilwara, Rajasthan.

Personal details
- Born: 18 January 1946 Udaipur
- Died: 31 May 2021 (aged 75) Jaipur
- Party: Janata Dal
- Other political affiliations: Bharatiya Jana Sangh
- Spouse: Bhawani Kumari
- Education: Mayo College, Ajmer

Hemendra Singh Banera (18 January 1946 – 31 May 2021) was an Indian politician. He was elected as one of the youngest members in the Lok Sabha at the age of 25 representing Bhilwara as a member of the Janata Dal.
