= Gopichand Meena =

Member of Rajasthan Legislative Assembly

Member of Rajasthan Legislative Assembly
- Incumbent
- Assumed office 2018
- Preceded by: Dheeraj Gurjar
- Constituency: Jahazpur

Personal details
- Born: 15 July 1975 (age 50) Sarsiya, Bhilwara
- Party: Bharatiya Janata Party
- Spouse: Sharma Devi Meena
- Parent: Jaykishan Meena (father)

Gopichand Meena (born 15 July 1975) is an Indian politician currently serving as a member of the 16th Rajasthan Legislative Assembly, representing the Jahazpur constituency. He previously served as an MLA from 2018 to 2023, also representing the same constituency.

== Political career ==
He was elected as an MLA from the Jahazpur constituency in the 2018 Rajasthan Legislative Assembly election, defeating Dheeraj Gurjar by a margin of 13,253 votes.

Following the 2023 Rajasthan Legislative Assembly election, he was re-elected as an MLA from the Jahazpur constituency, defeating Dheeraj Gurjar, the candidate from the Indian National Congress (INC), by a margin of 580 votes.
