= Shahpura, Bhilwara Assembly constituency =

Legislative Assembly constituency in Rajasthan State, India

Coordinates: 25.62°N 74.92°E

Shahpura
- Constituency No. 181 for the Rajasthan Legislative Assembly

Constituency details
- Country: India
- Region: North India
- State: Rajasthan
- District: Bhilwara
- Lok Sabha constituency: Bhilwara
- Total electors: 252,867
- Reservation: SC

Member of Legislative Assembly
- 16th Rajasthan Legislative Assembly
- Incumbent Lalaram Bairwa
- Party: Bharatiya Janata Party

Shahpura Assembly constituency is one of the 200 Legislative Assembly constituencies of Rajasthan state in India.

It is part of Bhilwara district and is reserved for candidates belonging to the Scheduled Castes.

== Members of the Legislative Assembly ==
Year	Member	Party
2003	Ramratan Bairwa	Bharatiya Janata Party
2008	Mahaveer Prasad Mochi	Indian National Congress
2013	Kailash Chandra Meghwal	Bharatiya Janata Party
2018	Kailash Chandra Meghwal	Bharatiya Janata Party
2023	Lalaram Bairwa	Bharatiya Janata Party

== Election results ==
=== 2023 ===
2023 Rajasthan Legislative Assembly election: Shahpura, Bhilwara
Party	Candidate	Votes	%	±%
BJP	Lalaram Bairwa	100,135	54.28	−5.42
INC	Narendra Kumar Regar	40,837	22.14	+6.3
Independent	Kailash Chandra Meghwal	34,783	18.85	
Right To Recall Party	Mahaveer Regar	2,014	1.09	
NOTA	None of the above	2,326	1.26	−1.54
Majority		59,298	32.14	−11.72
Turnout		184,481	72.96	+0.69
BJP hold		Swing		

=== 2018 ===
26909

Rajasthan Legislative Assembly Election, 2018: Shahpura
Party	Candidate	Votes	%	±%
BJP	Kailash Chandra Meghwal	101,451	59.7	
INC	Mahaveer Prasad	26,909	15.84	
Independent	Rajkumar Bairwa	24,482	14.41	
RLP	Debi Lal Meghvnshi	5,376	3.16	
BSP	Ramdayal Regar	1,610	0.95	
Independent	Shankar	1,552	0.91	
NOTA	None of the above	4,756	2.8	
Majority		74,542	43.86	
Turnout		169,927	72.27	

== See also ==
- List of constituencies of the Rajasthan Legislative Assembly
- Bhilwara district
