= Banwari Lal Bairwa =

Indian politician

Deputy Chief Minister of Rajasthan
- In office 25 January 1998 - 8 December 2003 Serving with Kamala Beniwal

Member of Parliament for Tonk
- In office 1980 - 1989

Personal details
- Born: 19 January 1933 Tonk, Tonk State, British India
- Died: 22 July 2009 (aged 76) Jaipur, Rajasthan, India
- Party: Indian National Congress
- Occupation: Politician

Banwari Lal Bairwa (19 January 1933 – 22 July 2009) was an Indian politician and former Deputy Chief Minister of Rajasthan. He was a former Member of Parliament from Tonk (Lok Sabha constituency) in Rajasthan. He was a leader of Indian National Congress.
