= 1989 Indian general election =

- 22 and 26 November 1989

529 of the 543 seats in the Lok Sabha 265 seats needed for a majority
- Registered: 498,906,129
- Turnout: 61.95% (▼2.06pp)
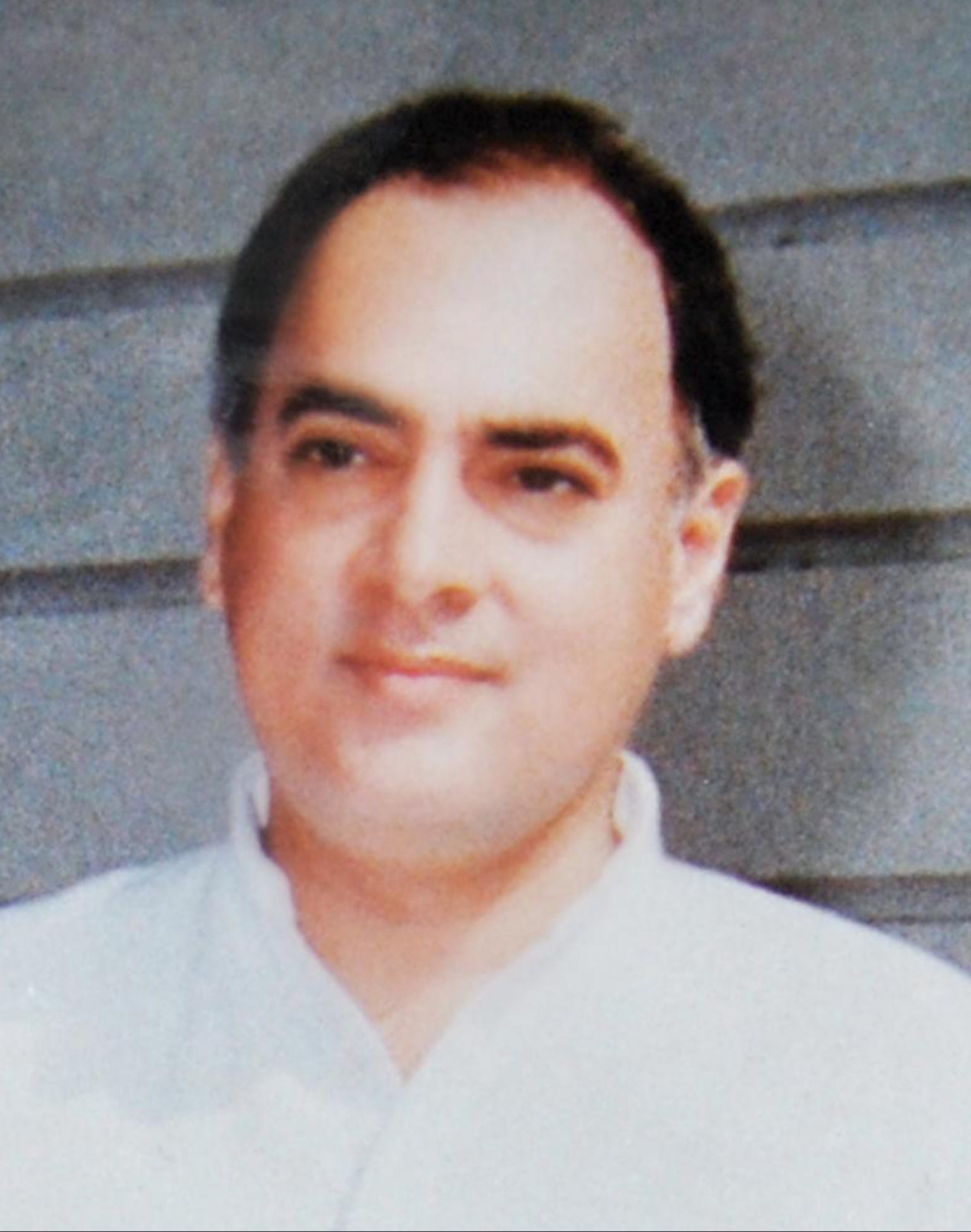

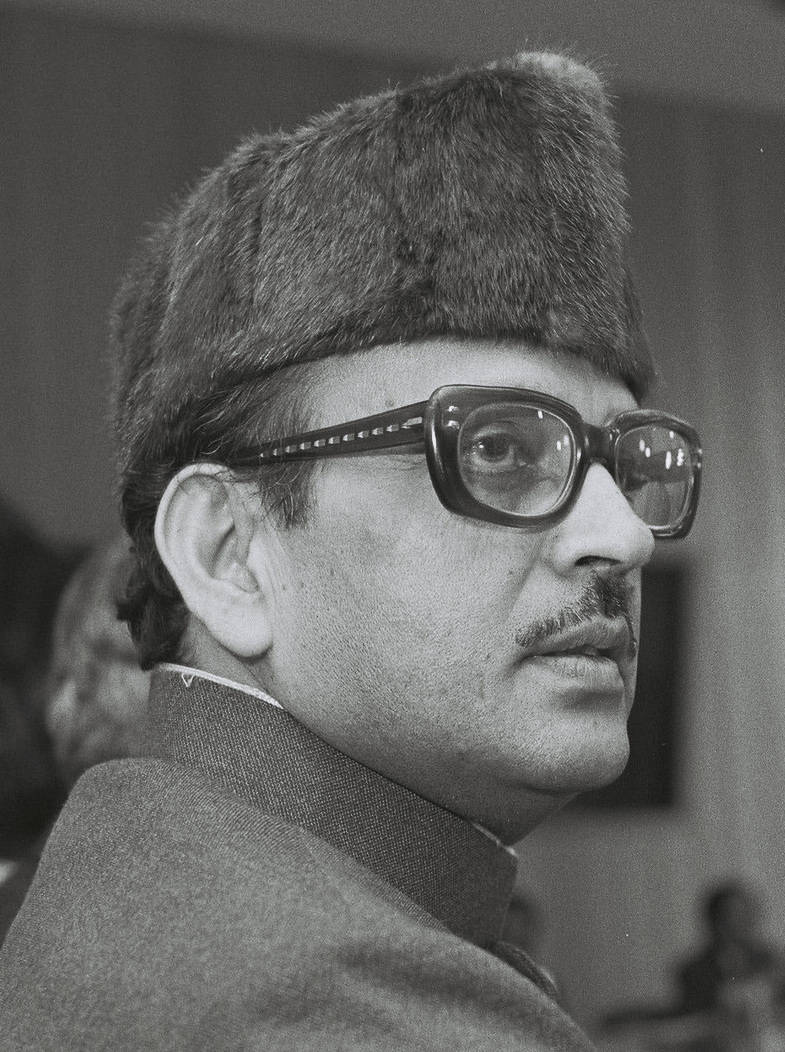

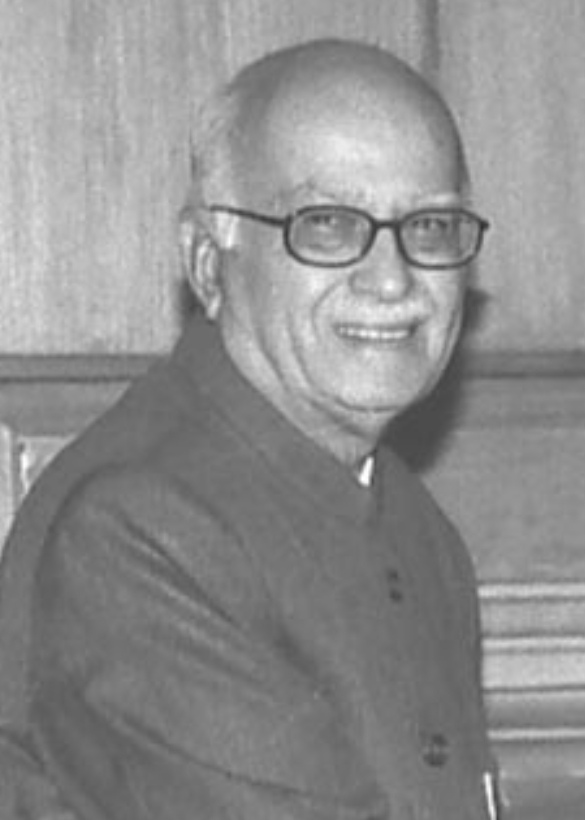

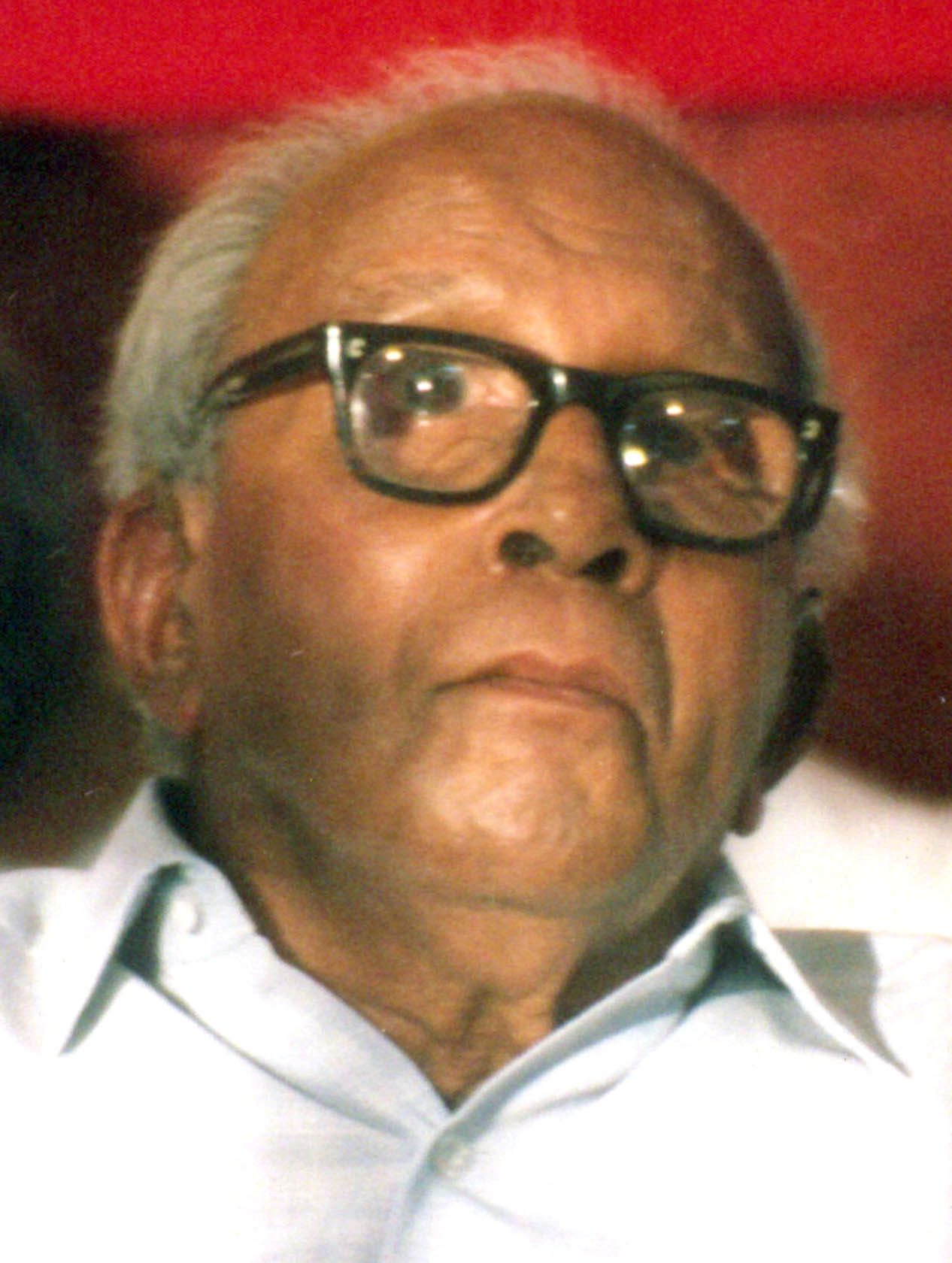
	First party	Second party
Leader	Rajiv Gandhi	V. P. Singh
Party	INC(I)	JD
Last election	46.86%, 414 seats	13.50%, 14 seats
Seats won	197	143
Seat change	▼217	▲129
Popular vote	118,894,702	53,518,521
Percentage	39.53%	17.79%
Swing	▼7.33pp	▲4.29pp
	Third party	Fourth party
Leader	Lal Krishna Advani	E. M. S. Namboodiripad
Party	BJP	CPI(M)
Last election	7.74%, 2 seats	5.87%, 22 seats
Seats won	85	33
Seat change	▲83	▲11
Popular vote	34,171,477	19,691,309
Percentage	11.36%	6.55%
Swing	▲3.62pp	▲0.68pp
- Results by constituency
Prime Minister before election
Rajiv Gandhi
INC(I)
Prime Minister after election
V. P. Singh
JD

General elections were held in India on 22 and 26 November 1989 to elect the members of the ninth Lok Sabha. The incumbent Indian National Congress (Indira) government under the premiership of Rajiv Gandhi lost its mandate, even though it was still the largest single party in the Lok Sabha. V. P. Singh, the leader of the second largest party Janata Dal (which also headed the National Front) was invited by the President of India to form the government. The government was formed with outside support from the Bharatiya Janata Party and Communist parties led by CPI(M). V. P. Singh was sworn in as the seventh Prime Minister of India on 2 December 1989.

== Background ==
The 1989 elections were held after the Lok Sabha elected in 1984 completed its five-year term. Although Rajiv Gandhi had won the 1984 elections by an unprecedented landslide (mainly due to an overwhelming outpour of popular grief for to his mother's assassination), by 1989 he was trying to fight off scandals that had marred his administration.

The Bofors scandal, Gandhi's supposed attempt at shielding Adil Shahryar, who had been involved in the 1984 Bhopal tragedy, allegations of Muslim appeasement in the wake of the Shah Bano case, rising insurgency in Assam, insurrection in Punjab, Indian involvement in the Sri Lankan civil war were just some of the problems that stared at his government. Rajiv's biggest critic was Vishwanath Pratap Singh, who held the portfolios of the finance ministry and the defence ministry in the government.

But Singh was soon sacked from the Cabinet and he then resigned from his memberships in the Congress and the Lok Sabha. He formed the Jana Morcha with Arun Nehru and Arif Mohammad Khan and re-entered the Lok Sabha as an independent MP from Allahabad. Witnessing V. P. Singh's meteoric rise on national stage, Rajiv tried to counter him with another prominent Rajput stalwart Satyendra Narain Singh but failed eventually.

On 11 October 1988, the birth anniversary of Jayprakasha Narayan, V. P Singh made Jana Morcha merge with the Janata Party & some of its breakaway factions like the Janata Party (Secular), Lok Dal & Congress (Jagjivan) to form the Janata Dal. Singh then formed the National Front consisting of the Janata Dal, Congress (Socialist) of Sarat Chandra Sinha, TDP of N. T. Rama Rao, DMK of M. Karunanidhi & AGP of Prafulla Mahanta. The National Front also received outside support of Lal Krishna Advani from the Bharatiya Janata Party (which had also been formed out of the Janata Party) & Jyoti Basu from the Communist Party of India (Marxist).

To remove the allegations of Muslim appeasement against the Congress (I) party, Rajiv Gandhi took the step of unlocking the gates of the disputed Babri Masjid in Ayodhya in 1986, which inadvertently caused increased public consciousness about the dispute over the site. The BJP was able to galvanize significant support from the country's Hindu majority towards itself by its electoral promise of constructing a Hindu temple at the site after tearing down the mosque.

Voting was not held in Assam due to rising unrest and a rebellion of Bodos, culminating into a massacre of 535 people at Gohpur. The Union territory of Goa, Daman and Diu was split into Goa and Daman & Diu with Goa retaining its two seats and the latter gaining a seat, resulting in the total number of Lok Sabha seats increasing by one to a total of 543. As elections were not held in Assam, only 529 seats were contested.

== Results ==
Party	Votes	%	Seats
Indian National Congress (Indira)	118,894,702	39.53	197
Janata Dal	53,518,521	17.79	143
Bharatiya Janata Party	34,171,477	11.36	85
Communist Party of India (Marxist)	19,691,309	6.55	33
Telugu Desam Party	9,909,728	3.29	2
Communist Party of India	7,734,697	2.57	12
Dravida Munnetra Kazhagam	7,196,099	2.39	0
Bahujan Samaj Party	6,213,390	2.07	3
All India Anna Dravida Munnetra Kazhagam	4,518,649	1.50	11
Janata Party	3,029,743	1.01	0
Shiromani Akali Dal (Simranjit Singh Mann)	2,318,872	0.77	6
Revolutionary Socialist Party	1,854,276	0.62	4
Pattali Makkal Katchi	1,561,371	0.52	0
Doordarshi Party	1,338,566	0.45	0
All India Forward Bloc	1,261,310	0.42	3
Jharkhand Mukti Morcha	1,032,276	0.34	3
Indian Congress (Socialist) – Sarat Chandra Sinha	978,377	0.33	1
Indian Union Muslim League	974,234	0.32	2
Indian People's Front	737,551	0.25	1
Peasants and Workers Party of India	636,589	0.21	0
All India Majlis-e-Ittehadul Muslimeen	617,376	0.21	1
Lok Dal (Bahuguna)	602,110	0.20	0
Bharatiya Republican Paksha	572,434	0.19	0
Karnataka Rajya Ryota Sangha	495,565	0.16	0
Republican Party of India (Khobragade)	468,615	0.16	0
Gorkha National Liberation Front	435,070	0.14	1
Shiromani Akali Dal (Badal)	427,609	0.14	0
Jharkhand Dal	367,838	0.12	0
Kerala Congress (M)	352,191	0.12	1
Shiv Sena	339,426	0.11	1
Marxist Co-ordination Committee	247,013	0.08	1
Nagaland People's Council	239,124	0.08	0
Hindu Mahasabha	217,514	0.07	1
Manipur Peoples Party	147,128	0.05	0
Republican Party of India	129,300	0.04	0
Humanist Party of India	122,947	0.04	0
All India Dalit Muslim Minorities Suraksha Mahasangh	120,159	0.04	0
Maharashtrawadi Gomantak Party	116,392	0.04	1
Kuki National Assembly	108,085	0.04	0
Shiromani Akali Dal	100,570	0.03	0
Marxist Communist Party of India (S.S. Srivastava)	100,300	0.03	0
People's Party of Arunachal	96,181	0.03	0
Uttar Pradesh Republican Party	91,740	0.03	0
Sikkim Sangram Parishad	91,608	0.03	1
Amra Bangali	80,834	0.03	0
Jammu & Kashmir National Conference	71,194	0.02	3
Mizo National Front	70,749	0.02	0
Kerala Congress	68,811	0.02	0
Tharasu Makkal Mandaram	64,885	0.02	0
Democratic Party	43,667	0.01	0
Shoshit Samaj Dal	42,282	0.01	0
Uttarakhand Kranti Dal	39,465	0.01	0
Communist Party of India (Marxist–Leninist)	38,937	0.01	0
Muslim Majlis Uttar Pradesh	25,839	0.01	0
Proutist Bloc Of India	23,331	0.01	0
Jammu & Kashmir Panthers Party	22,625	0.01	0
Bharatiya Jana Sangh	22,446	0.01	0
Karnataka Gana Parishad	19,593	0.01	0
Socialist Party (Lohiya)	17,639	0.01	0
Tamiliar Kazhagam	12,859	0.00	0
Rising Sun Party	12,858	0.00	0
Indian Congress (J) Trikha Group	12,539	0.00	0
Socialist Party	12,430	0.00	0
Socialist Unity Centre of India	8,747	0.00	0
All India Garib Congress	7,635	0.00	0
Hul Jharkhand Party	6,663	0.00	0
Bhatiya Krishi Udyog Sangh	5,895	0.00	0
Lok Party	4,731	0.00	0
Akhil Bhartiya Gorkha League (Budhiman Gurung)	4,426	0.00	0
Shoshit Samaj Party	3,756	0.00	0
Scientific Vedic Revolutionary Party	3,470	0.00	0
Deseeya Karshaka Party	3,059	0.00	0
Akhil Bharatiya Ram Rajya Parishad	2,998	0.00	0
Barat Desam Labour Party	2,944	0.00	0
Progressive Hul Jharkhand	2,890	0.00	0
Republicon Presidium Party	2,791	0.00	0
West Orissa Peoples Front	2,682	0.00	0
West Bengal Socialist Party (Biman Mitra)	2,411	0.00	0
All India Shiromani Baba Jiwan Singh Mazhbi Dal	2,368	0.00	0
Akhil Bhartiya Hindustani Krantikari Samajwadi Party	2,263	0.00	0
Green Party of India	2,142	0.00	0
Akhil Baratiya Pichhra Varg Party	2,055	0.00	0
Tamil Nadu Peoples Welfare Association	1,964	0.00	0
Sadharam Rajya Parishad	1,928	0.00	0
Indian National Congress (O) Anti-Merger Group	1,735	0.00	0
Gujarat Janata Parishad	1,577	0.00	0
All India Justice Party	1,428	0.00	0
Peoples Democracy of India	1,392	0.00	0
Punjab Peoples Party	1,374	0.00	0
Hindustan Janata Party	1,361	0.00	0
Bharatha Makkal Congress	1,357	0.00	0
Deccan Congress	1,332	0.00	0
Akhil Bhartiya Lok Tantrik Party	1,272	0.00	0
Vijaya Shakti	1,093	0.00	0
Bhartiya Loktantrik Mazdoor Dal	1,035	0.00	0
Pandav Dal	918	0.00	0
National Republican Party	839	0.00	0
Bhartiya Loktantrik Mazdoor Sangh	703	0.00	0
Mahabharat Peoples Party	694	0.00	0
Indian Union Muslim League (IML)	687	0.00	0
Manipur Peoples Council	677	0.00	0
Vishal Bharat Party	621	0.00	0
Republican Party of India (Gavai Group)	539	0.00	0
Punjab Kairon Dal	493	0.00	0
Peoples Party of India	478	0.00	0
Indian Labour Party	406	0.00	0
Socialist Labour League	391	0.00	0
Bharatiya Krantikari Kisan Sang	367	0.00	0
Kamaraj Desiya Congress	322	0.00	0
Punjab Naya Front	314	0.00	0
Hindu Shiv Sena	160	0.00	0
Bhartiya Lok Kalyan Dal	145	0.00	0
Labour Party of India	99	0.00	0
Independents	15,793,781	5.25	12
Nominated Anglo-Indians			2
Total	300,776,423	100.00	531
Valid votes	300,776,423	97.32	
Invalid/blank votes	8,274,072	2.68	
Total votes	309,050,495	100.00	
Registered voters/turnout	498,906,129	61.95	
Source: ECI

=== Results by state/union territory ===
State/Union Territory	Seats						
State/Union Territory	Seats	INC	JND	BJP	LF (Note: LF (Left Front) consisted of the CPI(M), CPI, RSP, and AIFB.)	IND	OTH
Andhra Pradesh	42	39	—N/a	—N/a	—N/a	—N/a	3
Arunachal Pradesh	2	2	—N/a	—N/a	—N/a	—N/a	—N/a
Bihar	54	4	32	8	5	—N/a	5
Goa	2	1	—N/a	—N/a	—N/a	—N/a	1
Gujarat	26	3	11	12	—N/a	—N/a	—N/a
Haryana	10	4	6	—N/a	—N/a	—N/a	—N/a
Himachal Pradesh	4	1	—N/a	3	—N/a	—N/a	—N/a
Jammu & Kashmir	6	2	—N/a	—N/a	—N/a	1	3
Karnataka	28	27	1	—N/a	—N/a	—N/a	—N/a
Kerala	20	14	—N/a	—N/a	2	—N/a	4
Madhya Pradesh	40	8	4	27	—N/a	1	—N/a
Maharashtra	48	28	5	10	1	3	1
Manipur	2	2	—N/a	—N/a	—N/a	—N/a	—N/a
Meghalaya	2	2	—N/a	—N/a	—N/a	—N/a	—N/a
Mizoram	1	1	—N/a	—N/a	—N/a	—N/a	—N/a
Nagaland	1	1	—N/a	—N/a	—N/a	—N/a	—N/a
Orissa	21	3	16	—N/a	2	—N/a	—N/a
Punjab	13	2	1	—N/a	—N/a	3	7
Rajasthan	25	—N/a	11	13	1	—N/a	—N/a
Sikkim	1	—N/a	—N/a	—N/a	—N/a	—N/a	1
Tamil Nadu	39	27	—N/a	—N/a	1	—N/a	11
Tripura	2	2	—N/a	—N/a	—N/a	—N/a	—N/a
Uttar Pradesh	85	15	54	8	3	2	3
West Bengal	42	4	—N/a	—N/a	37	—N/a	1
A & N Islands	1	1	—N/a	—N/a	—N/a	—N/a	—N/a
Chandigarh	1	—N/a	1	—N/a	—N/a	—N/a	—N/a
Dadra & Nagar Haveli	1	—N/a	—N/a	—N/a	—N/a	1	—N/a
Daman & Diu	1	—N/a	—N/a	—N/a	—N/a	1	—N/a
NCT Delhi	7	2	1	4	—N/a	—N/a	—N/a
Lakshadweep	1	1	—N/a	—N/a	—N/a	—N/a	—N/a
Pondicherry	1	1	—N/a	—N/a	—N/a	—N/a	—N/a
Total	529	197	143	85	52	12	40

== Aftermath ==
V. P. Singh, who was the head of the Janata Dal, was chosen leader of the National Front government with outside support of the BJP & CPI(M). The alliance broke down after Singh supported Bihar's Chief Minister Lalu Prasad Yadav's step to arrest Advani in Samastipur to stop his Ram Rath Yatra, which was going to the Babri Masjid site in Ayodhya on 23 October 1990. Following this incident, BJP withdrew their support to Singh government, causing them to lose parliamentary vote of confidence on 7 November 1990.

Chandra Shekhar broke away from the Janata Dal with 64 MPs and formed the Samajwadi Janata Party in 1990. He got outside support from the Congress(I) and became the 8th Prime Minister of India. He finally resigned on 21 June 1991, after the Congress(I) withdrew its support alleging that the Chandra Shekhar government was spying on Rajiv Gandhi.

== See also ==
- V. P. Singh ministry
- Chandra Shekhar ministry
- List of members of the 9th Lok Sabha
- 1989 Indian general election by state or union territory

== Bibliography ==
- Krishna, Ananth V. (2011), India Since Independence: Making Sense Of Indian Politics, Pearson Education India, ISBN 9788131734650
