= Kailash Chandra Meghwal =

Indian politician

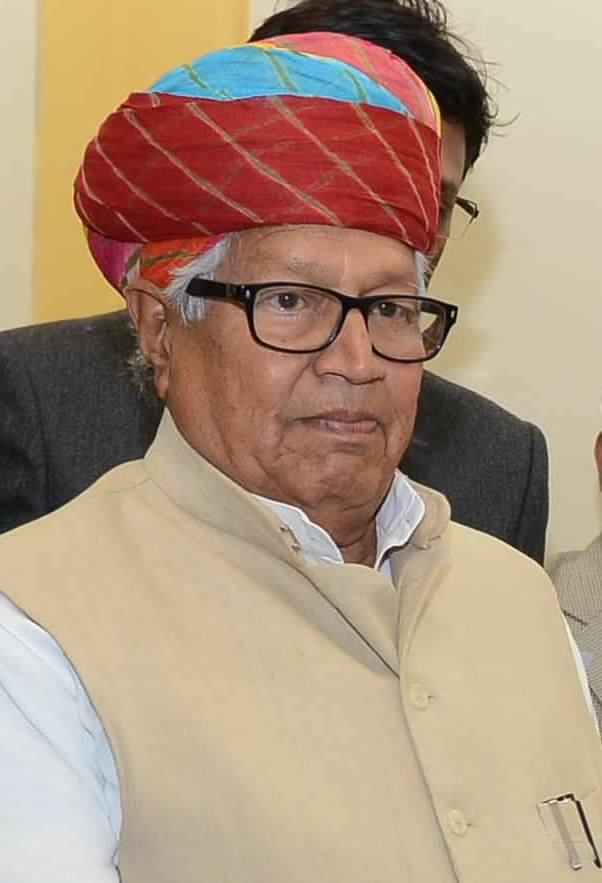

Speaker of Rajasthan Legislative Assembly
- In office 22 January 2014 – 15 January 2019
- Preceded by: Deependra Singh Shekhawat
- Succeeded by: C. P. Joshi
- Constituency: Shahpura, (SC)

Union Minister of State for Social Justice and Empowerment
- In office 24 May 2003 – 22 May 2004
- Prime Minister: Atal Bihari Vajpayee
- Minister: Satyanarayan Jatiya

Home Minister, Government of Rajasthan
- In office 1993–1998

Member of Parliament for Tonk
- In office 2001–2009

Member of Parliament Lok sabha
- In office 1989 to 1991
- Constituency: Jalore

Member of Legislative Assembly
- In office 2008–2023
- Constituency: Shahpura

Personal details
- Born: 22 March 1934 (age 92) Udaipur, Udaipur State, British India
- Party: Bharatiya Janata Party
- Website: http://assembly.rajasthan.gov.in/KailashMeghwal.htm
- As of 14 September, 2006

Kailash Chandra Meghwal (born 22 March 1934) is a former Speaker of Rajasthan Legislative Assembly, former union minister of state in Government of India and a national vice president of Bharatiya Janata Party. He is the MLA of Shahpura, Bhilwara constituency of Rajasthan in 14th Rajasthan Legislative Assembly & Ex-MP Tonk constituency of Rajasthan in 14th Lok Sabha. He was minister of state for social justice and empowerment from 2003 to 2004.

== Membership ==
- 1977–1985 Member, Rajasthan Legislative Assembly (two terms)
- 1989 Elected to 9th Lok Sabha from Jalore
- 1990 Member, Rajasthan Legislative Assembly (3rd term)
- 1993–1998 Member, Rajasthan Legislative Assembly (4th term)
- 22 Sept. 2001 Re-elected to 13th Lok Sabha (in by-election, 2nd term)
- 2004 Re-elected to 14th Lok Sabha, (3rd term)
- 2013 Member, Rajasthan Legislative Assembly (5th term)
- 2018 Member, Rajasthan Legislative Assembly (6th term)

Political offices
Preceded by Deependra Singh Shekhawat	Speaker of Rajasthan Legislative Assembly; 22 January 2014 – 15 January 2019	Succeeded by C. P. Joshi
