= 2024 Indian general election in Rajasthan =

Election to constitute the 18th Lok Sabha in 2024 in Rajasthan

- 19 and 26 April 2024

All 25 Rajasthan seats in the Lok Sabha
- Opinion polls
- Turnout: 61.34% (▼5%)
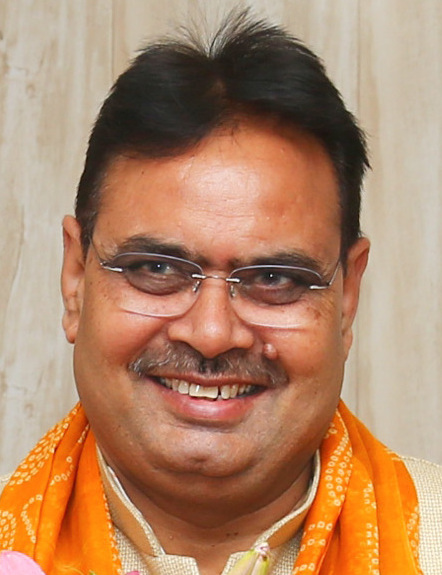

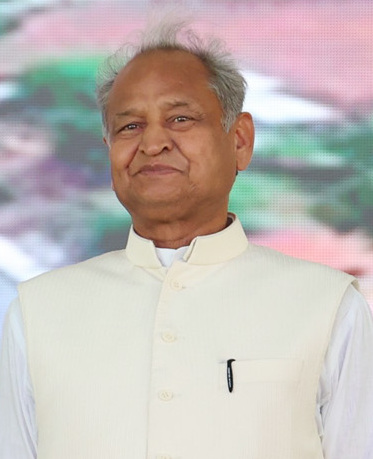
| | First party | Second party |
|---|---|---|
| Leader | Bhajan Lal Sharma | Ashok Gehlot |
| Party | BJP | INC |
| Alliance | NDA | INDIA |
| Leader since | 2023 | 1998 |
| Leader's seat | Did not contest | Did not contest |
| Last election | 59.07%, 25 seats | 34.59%, 0 seat |
| Seats won | 14 | 11 |
| Seat change | ▼11 | ▲11 |
| Popular vote | 16,165,859 | 14,783,024 |
| Percentage | 49.24% | 45.09% |
| Swing | ▼9.83 pp | ▲10.50pp |
Prime Minister before election
Narendra Modi
BJP
Prime Minister after election
Narendra Modi
BJP

The 2024 Indian general election was held in Rajasthan in two phases on 19 April and 26 April 2024 to elect 25 members of the 18th Lok Sabha. Bye-poll for Bagidora Assembly constituency is to be held with this election. The result of the election was announced on 4 June 2024.

== Election schedule ==
On 16 March 2024, the Election Commission of India announced the schedule for the 2024 Indian general election, with Rajasthan scheduled to vote during the first two phases on 19 April and 26 April.

Phase wise schedule of 2024 Indian general election in Rajasthan Phase 1 Phase 2

| Poll event | Phase | |
|---|---|---|
| Poll event | I | II |
| Notification date | 20 March | 28 March |
| Last date for filing nomination | 27 March | 4 April |
| Scrutiny of nomination | 28 March | 5 April |
| Last Date for withdrawal of nomination | 30 March | 8 April |
| Date of poll | 19 April | 26 April |
| Date of counting of votes/Result | 4 June 2024 | |
| No. of constituencies | 12 | 13 |

== Parties and alliances ==
=== National Democratic Alliance ===
National Democratic Alliance

| Party | Flag | Symbol | Leader | Seats contested |
|---|---|---|---|---|
| Bharatiya Janata Party | | | Bhajan Lal Sharma | 25 |

=== Indian National Developmental Inclusive Alliance ===
Indian National Developmental Inclusive Alliance

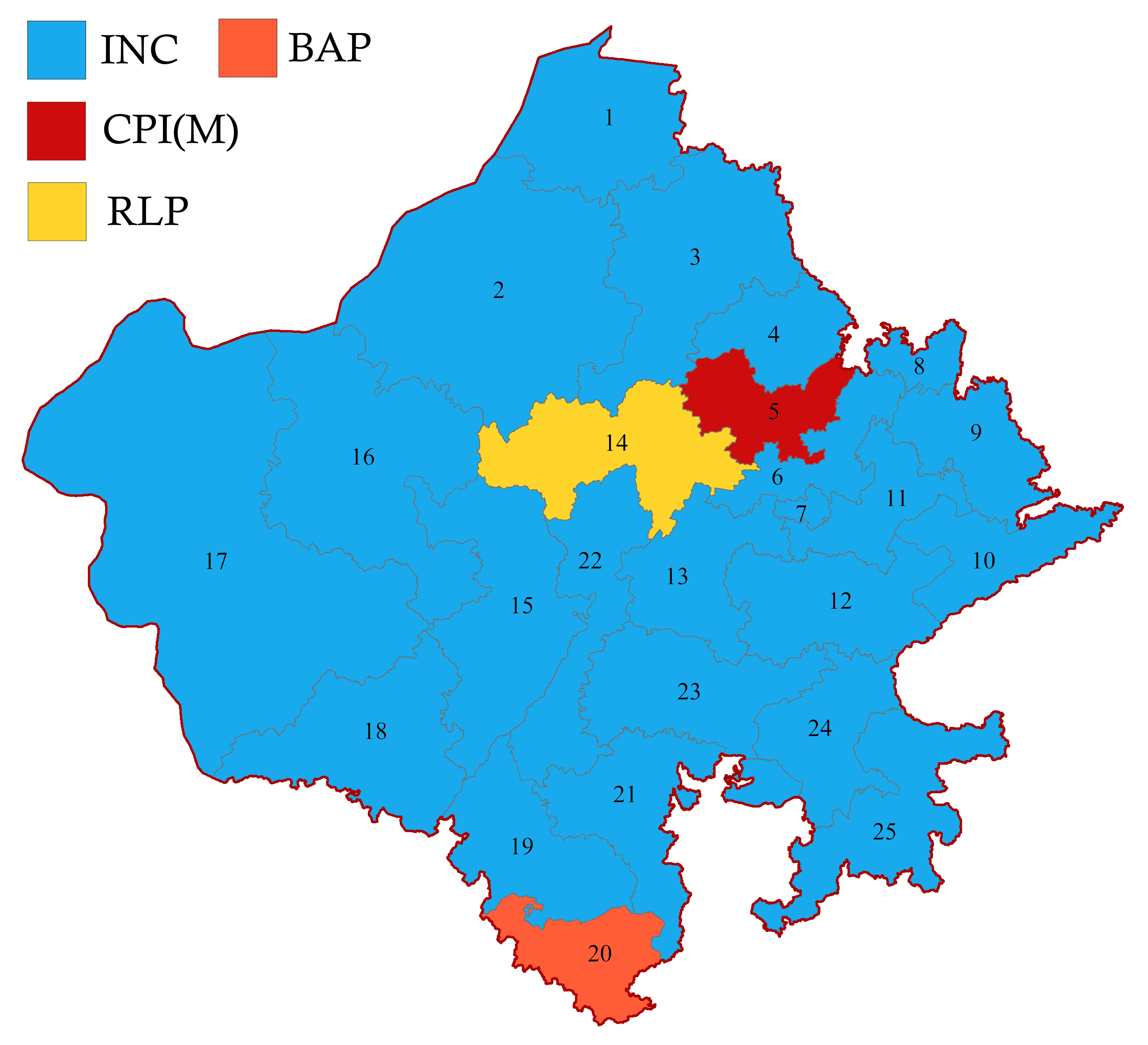

| Party | Flag | Symbol | Leader | Seats contested |
|---|---|---|---|---|
| Indian National Congress | | | Ashok Gehlot | 22 |
| Bharat Adivasi Party (Note: The Congress party had initially given its ticket to Arvind Damor for the Banswara-Dungarpur seat, but later formed a last-minute alliance with the Bharat Adivasi Party (BAP) and decided to support BAP candidate Rajkumar Roat instead. When Damor refused to withdraw his nomination, the Congress leadership began campaigning against its own candidate, urging voters to support Roat and not vote for Damor.) (Note: The BAP also fielded candidates in Udaipur, Chittorgarh, Jalore, Pali, and Tonk-Sawai Madhopur, but the Congress (INDIA bloc) supported BAP only in the Banswara constituency.) | | | Rajkumar Roat | 1 |
| Communist Party of India (Marxist) | | | Amra Ram | 1 |
| Rashtriya Loktantrik Party | | | Hanuman Beniwal | 1 |
| Total | | | | 25 |

=== Others ===
| Party | Symbol | Seats contested |
|---|---|---|
| Bahujan Samaj Party | | 24 |
| Indian Peoples Green Party | | 8 |
| Bheem Tribal Congress | | 7 |
| Right to Recall Party | | 7 |
| Aazad Samaj Party (Kanshi Ram) | | 5 |
| Ambedkarite Party of India | | 3 |
| Bharatiya Yuva Jan Ekta Party | | 2 |
| Ekam Sanatan Bharat Dal | | 2 |
| Rashtriya Janshakti Party- Secular | | 2 |
| Rashtriya Sawarn Dal | | 2 |
| Abhinav Rajasthan Party | | 1 |
| Akhil Bharatiya Congress Dal (Ambedkar) | | 1 |
| Akhil Bhartiya Aamjan Party | | 1 |
| Bahujan Kranti Party (Marxwad-Ambedkarwad) | | 1 |
| Bharatheeya Jawan Kisan Party | | 1 |
| Bharat Rakshak Party (Democratic) | | 1 |
| Bhartiya Garib Vikas Kalyan Party | | 1 |
| Bhartiya Jan Adhikar Party | | 1 |
| Bhartiya Jan Samman Party | | 1 |
| Bhartiya Party | | 1 |
| Bharatiya Sampuran Krantikari Party | | 1 |
| Dalit Kranti Dal | | 1 |
| Hindustan Janata Party | | 1 |
| Jai Hind Congress Party | | 1 |
| National Future Party | | 1 |
| National Janmandal Party | | 1 |
| Pehchan People's Party | | 1 |
| Rajasthan Raj Party | | 1 |
| Rashtriya Samta Vikas Party | | 1 |
| Rashtriya Sanatan Party | | 1 |
| Republican Party of India (Athawale) | | 1 |
| Sarv Samaj Party | | 1 |
| Socialist Unity Centre of India (Communist) | | 1 |
| Ummeed Party of India | | 1 |
| Viro Ke Vir Indian Party | | 1 |
| Vishva Shakti Party | | 1 |
| Total | | 88 |

== Candidates ==
| Constituency | | NDA | | INDIA | |
| # | Name | Party | Candidate | Party | Candidate |
|---|---|---|---|---|---|
| 1 | Ganganagar (SC) | BJP | Priyanka Balan Meghwal | INC | Kuldeep Indora |
| 2 | Bikaner (SC) | BJP | Arjun Ram Meghwal | INC | Govind Ram Meghwal |
| 3 | Churu | BJP | Devendra Jhajharia | INC | Rahul Kaswan |
| 4 | Jhunjhunu | BJP | Shubhkaran Choudhary | INC | Brijendra Singh Ola |
| 5 | Sikar | BJP | Sumedhanand Saraswati | CPI(M) | Amra Ram |
| 6 | Jaipur Rural | BJP | Rao Rajendra Singh | INC | Anil Chopra |
| 7 | Jaipur | BJP | Manju Sharma | INC | Pratap Singh Khachariyawas |
| 8 | Alwar | BJP | Bhupender Yadav | INC | Lalit Yadav |
| 9 | Bharatpur (SC) | BJP | Ramswaroop Koli | INC | Sanjana Jatav |
| 10 | Karauli–Dholpur (SC) | BJP | Indu Devi Jatav | INC | Bhajan Lal Jatav |
| 11 | Dausa (ST) | BJP | Kanhaiya Lal Meena | INC | Murari Lal Meena |
| 12 | Tonk–Sawai Madhopur | BJP | Sukhbir Singh Jaunapuria | INC | Harish Chandra Meena |
| 13 | Ajmer | BJP | Bhagirath Chaudhary | INC | Ramchandra Choudhary |
| 14 | Nagaur | BJP | Jyoti Mirdha | RLP | Hanuman Beniwal |
| 15 | Pali | BJP | P. P. Chaudhary | INC | Sangeeta Beniwal |
| 16 | Jodhpur | BJP | Gajendra Singh Shekhawat | INC | Karan Singh Uchiyarda |
| 17 | Barmer | BJP | Kailash Choudhary | INC | Ummeda Ram Beniwal |
| 18 | Jalore | BJP | Lumbaram Choudhary | INC | Vaibhav Gehlot |
| 19 | Udaipur (ST) | BJP | Mannalal Rawat | INC | Tarachand Meena |
| 20 | Banswara (ST) | BJP | Mahendrajeet Singh Malviya | BAP | Rajkumar Roat |
| 21 | Chittorgarh | BJP | Chandra Prakash Joshi | INC | Udai Lal Anjana |
| 22 | Rajsamand | BJP | Mahima Vishweshwar Singh | INC | Damodar Gurjar |
| 23 | Bhilwara | BJP | Damodar Agarwal | INC | C. P. Joshi |
| 24 | Kota | BJP | Om Birla | INC | Prahlad Gunjal |
| 25 | Jhalawar–Baran | BJP | Dushyant Singh | INC | Urmila Jain Bhaya |

== Surveys and polls ==
=== Opinion polls ===
| Polling agency | Date published | Margin of error | | | | Lead |
| Polling agency | Date published | Margin of error | NDA | INDIA | Others | Lead |
| ABP News-CVoter | March 2024 | ±5% | 25 | 0 | 0 | NDA |
| India Today-CVoter | February 2024 | ±3-5% | 25 | 0 | 0 | NDA |
| ABP News-CVoter | December 2023 | ±3-5% | 23-25 | 0-2 | 0 | NDA |
| Times Now-ETG | December 2023 | ±3% | 24-25 | 0-1 | 0 | NDA |
| India TV-CNX | October 2023 | ±3% | 23 | 2 | 0 | NDA |
| Times Now-ETG | September 2023 | ±3% | 21-24 | 1-2 | 0-1 | NDA |
| Times Now-ETG | August 2023 | ±3% | 19-22 | 2-4 | 0-1 | NDA |

| Polling agency | Date published | Margin of error | | | | Lead |
| Polling agency | Date published | Margin of error | NDA | INDIA | Others | Lead |
| ABP News-CVoter | March 2024 | ±5% | 60% | 39% | 1% | 21 |
| India Today-CVoter | February 2024 | ±3-5% | 59% | 35% | 6% | 24 |

=== Exit polls ===
| Polling agency | | | | Lead |
| Polling agency | NDA | INDIA | Others | Lead |
| TV9 Bharatvarsh- People's Insight - Polstrat | 19 | 5 | 1 | NDA |
| Actual results | 14 | 11 | 0 | NDA |

== Voter turnout ==
=== Phase wise ===
| Phase | Poll date | Constituencies | Voter turnout (%) |
|---|---|---|---|
| I | 19 April 2024 | Ganganagar, Bikaner, Churu, Jhunjhunu, Sikar, Jaipur Rural, Jaipur, Alwar, Bharatpur, Karauli–Dholpur, Dausa, Nagaur | 57.65% |
| II | 26 April 2024 | Tonk–Sawai Madhopur, Ajmer, Pali, Jodhpur, Barmer, Jalore, Udaipur, Banswara, Chittorgarh, Rajsamand, Bhilwara, Kota, Jhalawar–Baran | 65.03% |
| Total | | | 61.34% |

=== Constituency wise ===
| Constituency | | Poll date | Turnout | Swing |
|---|---|---|---|---|
| 1 | Ganganagar (SC) | 19 April 2024 | 66.59% | 8.18%▼ |
| 2 | Bikaner (SC) | 19 April 2024 | 54.11% | 5.32%▼ |
| 3 | Churu | 19 April 2024 | 63.61% | 2.29%▼ |
| 4 | Jhunjhunu | 19 April 2024 | 52.93% | 9.18%▼ |
| 5 | Sikar | 19 April 2024 | 57.53% | 7.65%▼ |
| 6 | Jaipur Rural | 19 April 2024 | 56.70% | 8.84%▼ |
| 7 | Jaipur | 19 April 2024 | 63.38% | 5.1%▼ |
| 8 | Alwar | 19 April 2024 | 60.07% | 7.1%▼ |
| 9 | Bharatpur (SC) | 19 April 2024 | 52.80% | 6.31%▼ |
| 10 | Karauli–Dholpur (SC) | 19 April 2024 | 49.59% | 5.59%▼ |
| 11 | Dausa (ST) | 19 April 2024 | 55.72% | 5.78%▼ |
| 12 | Tonk–Sawai Madhopur | 26 April 2024 | 56.58% | 6.86%▼ |
| 13 | Ajmer | 26 April 2024 | 59.65% | 7.67%▼ |
| 14 | Nagaur | 19 April 2024 | 57.23% | 5.09%▼ |
| 15 | Pali | 26 April 2024 | 57.19% | 5.79%▼ |
| 16 | Jodhpur | 26 April 2024 | 64.27% | 4.62%▼ |
| 17 | Barmer | 26 April 2024 | 75.93% | 2.63%▲ |
| 18 | Jalore | 26 April 2024 | 62.89% | 2.85%▼ |
| 19 | Udaipur (ST) | 26 April 2024 | 66.66% | 3.66%▼ |
| 20 | Banswara (ST) | 26 April 2024 | 73.88% | 0.98%▲ |
| 21 | Chittorgarh | 26 April 2024 | 68.61% | 3.78%▼ |
| 22 | Rajsamand | 26 April 2024 | 58.39% | 6.48%▼ |
| 23 | Bhilwara | 26 April 2024 | 60.37% | 5.27%▼ |
| 24 | Kota | 26 April 2024 | 71.26% | 1.04%▲ |
| 25 | Jhalawar–Baran | 26 April 2024 | 69.71% | 2.25%▼ |

== Results ==
=== Results by alliance or party ===
| Alliance/ Party | | Popular vote | | | Seats | | |
| Alliance/ Party | | Votes | % | ±pp | Contested | Won | +/− |
|---|---|---|---|---|---|---|---|
| NDA | BJP | 16,165,859 | 49.24 | ▼9.83 | 25 | 14 | ▼10 |
| INDIA | INC | 12,445,396 | 37.91 | ▲3.67 | 22 | 8 | ▲8 |
| INDIA | BAP | 1,100,609 | 3.35 | New | 6 | 1 | ▲1 |
| INDIA | CPI(M) | 645,559 | 1.97 | ▲1.77 | 1 | 1 | ▲1 |
| INDIA | RLP | 591,460 | 1.80 | ▼0.26 | 1 | 1 | Steady |
| INDIA | Total | 14,783,024 | 45.09 | ▲10.50 | 25 | 11 | ▲10 |
| Others | | | | | 88 | 0 | Steady |
| IND | | 11,98,072 | 3.61 | | 122 | 0 | Steady |
| NOTA | | 277,216 | 0.84 | ▼0.17 | | | |
| Total | | 3,31,64,877 | 100 | - | 266 | 25 | - |

=== Results by constituency ===
| Constituency | | | Winner | | | | Runner Up | | | | Margin | % |
| # | Name | Poll % | Candidate | Party | Votes | % | Candidate | Party | Votes | % | Margin | % |
|---|---|---|---|---|---|---|---|---|---|---|---|---|
| 1 | Ganganagar (SC) | 66.59▼ | Kuldeep Indora | INC | 7,26,492 | 51.40 | Priyanka Meghwal | BJP | 6,38,339 | 45.16 | 88,153 | 6.24 |
| 2 | Bikaner (SC) | 54.11▼ | Arjun Meghwal | BJP | 5,66,737 | 50.68 | Govind Ram Meghwal | INC | 5,11,026 | 45.67 | 55,711 | 5.01 |
| 3 | Churu | 63.61▼ | Rahul Kaswan | INC | 7,28,211 | 51.12 | Devendra Jhajharia | BJP | 6,55,474 | 46.01 | 72,737 | 5.11 |
| 4 | Jhunjhunu | 52.93▼ | Brijendra Ola | INC | 5,53,168 | 49.44 | Shubhkaran Choudhary | BJP | 5,34,933 | 47.81 | 18,235 | 1.63 |
| 5 | Sikar | 57.53▼ | Amra Ram | CPM | 6,59,300 | 50.68 | S. Saraswati | BJP | 5,86,404 | 45.08 | 72,896 | 5.60 |
| 6 | Jaipur Rural | 56.70▼ | Rajendra Singh | BJP | 6,17,877 | 48.96 | Anil Chopra | INC | 6,16,262 | 48.83 | 1,618 | 0.13 |
| 7 | Jaipur | 63.38▼ | Manju Sharma | BJP | 8,86,850 | 60.61 | Pratap Khachariyawas | INC | 555,083 | 37.93 | 3,31,767 | 22.68 |
| 8 | Alwar | 60.07▼ | Bhupender Yadav | BJP | 6,31,992 | 50.42 | Lalit Yadav | INC | 5,83,710 | 46.57 | 48,282 | 3.85 |
| 9 | Bharatpur (SC) | 52.80▼ | Sanjana Jatav | INC | 5,79,890 | 51.18 | Ramswaroop Koli | BJP | 5,27,907 | 46.59 | 51,983 | 4.59 |
| 10 | Karauli–Dholpur (SC) | 49.59▼ | Bhajan Jatav | INC | 5,30,011 | 53.64 | Indu Devi | BJP | 4,31,066 | 43.62 | 98,945 | 10.02 |
| 11 | Dausa (ST) | 55.72▼ | Murari Meena | INC | 6,46,266 | 60.24 | Kanhaiya Lal Meena | BJP | 4,08,926 | 38.12 | 2,37,340 | 22.12 |
| 12 | Tonk–Sawai Madhopur | 56.58▼ | Harish Meena | INC | 6,23,763 | 50.85 | Sukhbir Jaunapuria | BJP | 5,58,814 | 45.56 | 64,949 | 5.29 |
| 13 | Ajmer | 59.65▼ | Bhagirath Choudhary | BJP | 7,47,462 | 62.23 | Ramchandra Choudhary | INC | 4,17,471 | 34.76 | 3,29,991 | 27.47 |
| 14 | Nagaur | 57.23▼ | Hanuman Beniwal | RLP | 5,96,955 | 48.20 | Jyoti Mirdha | BJP | 5,54,730 | 44.79 | 42,225 | 3.41 |
| 15 | Pali | 57.19▼ | P. P. Chaudhary | BJP | 7,57,389 | 55.94 | Sangeeta Beniwal | INC | 5,12,038 | 37.82 | 2,45,351 | 18.12 |
| 16 | Jodhpur | 64.27▼ | Gajendra Shekhawat | BJP | 7,30,056 | 52.76 | Karan Singh Uchiyara | INC | 6,14,379 | 44.41 | 1,15,677 | 8.35 |
| 17 | Barmer | 75.93▲ | Ummeda Beniwal | INC | 7,04,676 | 41.74 | Ravindra Singh Bhati | IND | 5,73,777 | 34.74 | 1,18,176 | 7.00 |
| 18 | Jalore | 62.89▼ | Lumbaram Choudhary | BJP | 7,96,783 | 54.91 | Vaibhav Gehlot | INC | 5,95,240 | 41.02 | 2,01,543 | 13.89 |
| 19 | Udaipur (ST) | 66.66▼ | Manna Rawat | BJP | 7,38,286 | 49.27 | Tarachand Meena | INC | 4,76,678 | 31.81 | 2,61,608 | 17.46 |
| 20 | Banswara (ST) | 73.88▲ | Rajkumar Roat | BAP | 8,20,831 | 50.15 | Mahendrajeet Malviya | BJP | 5,73,777 | 35.05 | 2,47,054 | 15.10 |
| 21 | Chittorgarh | 68.61▼ | Chandra Joshi | BJP | 8,88,202 | 59.26 | Udai Lal Anjana | INC | 4,98,325 | 33.25 | 3,89,877 | 26.01 |
| 22 | Rajsamand | 58.39▼ | Mahima Mewar | BJP | 7,81,203 | 64.41 | Damodar Gurjar | INC | 3,88,980 | 32.06 | 3,92,223 | 32.35 |
| 23 | Bhilwara | 60.37▼ | Damodar Agarwal | BJP | 8,07,640 | 61.92 | C. P. Joshi | INC | 4,53,034 | 34.73 | 3,54,606 | 27.19 |
| 24 | Kota | 71.26▲ | Om Birla | BJP | 7,50,496 | 50.03 | Prahlad Gunjal | INC | 7,08,522 | 47.23 | 41,974 | 2.80 |
| 25 | Jhalawar–Baran | 69.71▼ | Dushyant Singh | BJP | 8,65,376 | 60.88 | Urmila Jain | INC | 4,94,387 | 34.78 | 3,70,989 | 26.10 |

=== Assembly Segment wise leads ===
| Constituency | | Winner | | | | Runner-up | | | | Margin |
| # | Name | Candidate | Party | Votes | % | Candidate | Party | Votes | % | Margin |
Ganganagar Lok Sabha constituency
| 1 | Sadulshahar | Kuldeep Indora | INC | 87,062 | 53.50 | Priyanka Balan Meghwal | BJP | 69,893 | 42.95 | 17,169 |
| 2 | Ganganagar | Priyanka Balan Meghwal | BJP | 90,258 | 57.20 | Kuldeep Indora | INC | 61,036 | 38.68 | 29,222 |
| 3 | Karanpur | Kuldeep Indora | INC | 85,049 | 50.98 | Priyanka Balan Meghwal | BJP | 77,240 | 46.30 | 7,809 |
| 4 | Suratgarh | Kuldeep Indora | INC | 83,754 | 49.61 | Priyanka Balan Meghwal | BJP | 79,731 | 47.23 | 4,023 |
| 5 | Raisinghnagar (SC) | Kuldeep Indora | INC | 1,06,534 | 58.08 | Priyanka Balan Meghwal | BJP | 71,313 | 38.87 | 35,221 |
| 7 | Sangaria | Kuldeep Indora | INC | 87,972 | 54.47 | Priyanka Balan Meghwal | BJP | 67,596 | 41.86 | 20,376 |
| 8 | Hanumangarh | Kuldeep Indora | INC | 1,03,471 | 52.94 | Priyanka Balan Meghwal | BJP | 83,852 | 42.77 | 19,889 |
| 9 | Pilibanga (SC) | Kuldeep Indora | INC | 1,05,318 | 51.64 | Priyanka Balan Meghwal | BJP | 92,214 | 45.35 | 13,104 |
Bikaner Lok Sabha constituency
| 6 | Anupgarh (SC) | Govind Ram Meghwal | INC | 84,713 | 50.64 | Arjun Ram Meghwal | BJP | 76,784 | 45.90 | 7,929 |
| 12 | Khajuwala (SC) | Govind Ram Meghwal | INC | 70,466 | 50.50 | Arjun Ram Meghwal | BJP | 63,098 | 45.22 | 7,368 |
| 13 | Bikaner West | Arjun Ram Meghwal | BJP | 95,238 | 61.94 | Govind Ram Meghwal | INC | 54,158 | 35.22 | 41,080 |
| 14 | Bikaner East | Arjun Ram Meghwal | BJP | 92,198 | 61.42 | Govind Ram Meghwal | INC | 53,869 | 35.88 | 38,329 |
| 15 | Kolayat | Arjun Ram Meghwal | BJP | 57,851 | 48.01 | Govind Ram Meghwal | INC | 51,610 | 47.81 | 241 |
| 16 | Lunkaransar | Govind Ram Meghwal | INC | 65,188 | 48.99 | Arjun Ram Meghwal | BJP | 62,732 | 47.14 | 2,456 |
| 17 | Dungargarh | Govind Ram Meghwal | INC | 67,161 | 51.65 | Arjun Ram Meghwal | BJP | 57,561 | 44.27 | 9,600 |
| 18 | Nokha | Arjun Ram Meghwal | BJP | 55,678 | 48.74 | Govind Ram Meghwal | INC | 53,801 | 47.10 | 1,877 |
Churu Lok Sabha constituency
| 10 | Nohar | Rahul Kaswan | INC | 1,02,712 | 52.85 | Devendra Jhajharia | BJP | 85,398 | 43.94 | 17,314 |
| 11 | Bhadra | Devendra Jhajharia | BJP | 92,216 | 49.97 | Rahul Kaswan | INC | 87,733 | 47.54 | 4,483 |
| 19 | Sadulpur | Rahul Kaswan | INC | 92,971 | 56.75 | Devendra Jhajharia | BJP | 67,334 | 41.10 | 25,637 |
| 20 | Taranagar | Rahul Kaswan | INC | 89,783 | 49.51 | Devendra Jhajharia | BJP | 86,351 | 47.67 | 3,432 |
| 21 | Sardarshahar | Rahul Kaswan | INC | 92,644 | 51.79 | Devendra Jhajharia | BJP | 80,630 | 42.44 | 12,014 |
| 22 | Churu | Rahul Kaswan | INC | 89,978 | 53.85 | Devendra Jhajharia | BJP | 73,026 | 43.70 | 16,952 |
| 23 | Ratangarh | Devendra Jhajharia | BJP | 81,000 | 48.80 | Rahul Kaswan | INC | 79,535 | 47.92 | 1,465 |
| 24 | Sujangarh (SC) | Rahul Kaswan | INC | 83,996 | 48.81 | Devendra Jhajharia | BJP | 82,206 | 47.77 | 1,790 |
Jhunjhunu Lok Sabha constituency
| 25 | Pilani (SC) | Brijendra Singh Ola | INC | 59,963 | 48.59 | Shubhkaran Choudhary | BJP | 59,926 | 48.56 | 27 |
| 26 | Surajgarh | Shubhkaran Choudhary | BJP | 75,483 | 52.04 | Brijendra Singh Ola | INC | 66,430 | 45.80 | 9,053 |
| 27 | Jhunjhunu | Brijendra Singh Ola | INC | 84,701 | 53.87 | Shubhkaran Choudhary | BJP | 68,659 | 43.67 | 16,042 |
| 28 | Mandawa | Brijendra Singh Ola | INC | 72,962 | 53.14 | Shubhkaran Choudhary | BJP | 59,524 | 43.35 | 13,438 |
| 29 | Nawalgarh | Shubhkaran Choudhary | BJP | 76,143 | 52.24 | Brijendra Singh Ola | INC | 65,764 | 45.11 | 10,379 |
| 30 | Udaipurwati | Shubhkaran Choudhary | BJP | 71,433 | 49.79 | Brijendra Singh Ola | INC | 68,447 | 47.71 | 2,986 |
| 31 | Khetri | Shubhkaran Choudhary | BJP | 52,931 | 48.77 | Brijendra Singh Ola | INC | 51,989 | 47.90 | 942 |
| 32 | Fatehpur | Brijendra Singh Ola | INC | 70,947 | 52.85 | Shubhkaran Choudhary | BJP | 59,570 | 44.37 | 11,377 |
Sikar Lok Sabha constituency
| 33 | Lachhmangarh | Amra Ram | CPI(M) | 85,772 | 52.35 | Sumedhanand Saraswati | BJP | 72,607 | 44.31 | 13,165 |
| 34 | Dhod (SC) | Amra Ram | CPI(M) | 99,502 | 57.02 | Sumedhanand Saraswati | BJP | 69,104 | 39.59 | 30,398 |
| 35 | Sikar | Amra Ram | CPI(M) | 97,865 | 51.77 | Sumedhanand Saraswati | BJP | 83,123 | 44.29 | 14,742 |
| 36 | Dantaramgarh | Amra Ram | CPI(M) | 92,661 | 52.52 | Sumedhanand Saraswati | BJP | 76,567 | 43.39 | 16,094 |
| 37 | Khandela | Amra Ram | CPI(M) | 76,261 | 51.42 | Sumedhanand Saraswati | BJP | 65,925 | 44.45 | 10,836 |
| 38 | Neem Ka Thana | Amra Ram | CPI(M) | 70,558 | 52.35 | Sumedhanand Saraswati | BJP | 58,672 | 44.31 | 11,886 |
| 39 | Srimadhopur | Sumedhanand Saraswati | BJP | 71,007 | 52.49 | Amra Ram | CPI(M) | 56,731 | 41.94 | 14,276 |
| 43 | Chomu | Sumedhanand Saraswati | BJP | 77,735 | 51.10 | Amra Ram | CPI(M) | 66,979 | 44.03 | 10,756 |
Jaipur Rural Lok Sabha constituency
| 40 | Kotputli | Anil Chopra | INC | 68,195 | 56.24 | Rao Rajendra Singh | BJP | 50,169 | 41.34 | 18,026 |
| 41 | Viratnagar | Anil Chopra | INC | 62,515 | 49.86 | Rao Rajendra Singh | BJP | 59,869 | 47.75 | 2,646 |
| 42 | Shahpura | Anil Chopra | INC | 78,446 | 57.27 | Rao Rajendra Singh | BJP | 55,227 | 40.39 | 23,219 |
| 44 | Phulera | Rao Rajendra Singh | BJP | 78,221 | 49.99 | Anil Chopra | INC | 74,520 | 47.62 | 3,701 |
| 46 | Jhotwara | Rao Rajendra Singh | BJP | 1,70,377 | 64.39 | Anil Chopra | INC | 89,603 | 33.86 | 80,774 |
| 47 | Amber | Anil Chopra | INC | 87,921 | 50.29 | Rao Rajendra Singh | BJP | 82,996 | 47.47 | 4,925 |
| 48 | Jamwa Ramgarh (ST) | Anil Chopra | INC | 74,560 | 56.94 | Rao Rajendra Singh | BJP | 55,975 | 41.95 | 18,585 |
| 63 | Bansur | Anil Chopra | INC | 66,533 | 53.09 | Rao Rajendra Singh | BJP | 55,355 | 44.17 | 11,178 |
Jaipur Lok Sabha constituency
| 49 | Hawa Mahal | Pratap Singh Khachariyawas | INC | 90,532 | 49.83 | Manju Sharma | BJP | 88,890 | 48.93 | 1,642 |
| 50 | Vidhyadhar Nagar | Manju Sharma | BJP | 1,59,875 | 71.18 | Pratap Singh Khachariyawas | INC | 61,365 | 27.33 | 98,510 |
| 51 | Civil Lines | Manju Sharma | BJP | 96,614 | 61.23 | Pratap Singh Khachariyawas | INC | 58,935 | 37.35 | 37,679 |
| 52 | Kishanpole | Pratap Singh Khachariyawas | INC | 69,420 | 52.07 | Manju Sharma | BJP | 62,524 | 46.90 | 6,896 |
| 53 | Adarsh Nagar | Pratap Singh Khachariyawas | INC | 94,245 | 54.29 | Manju Sharma | BJP | 77,488 | 44.57 | 16,757 |
| 54 | Malviya Nagar | Manju Sharma | BJP | 98,699 | 71.25 | Pratap Singh Khachariyawas | INC | 37,552 | 22.10 | 61,147 |
| 55 | Sanganer | Manju Sharma | BJP | 1,61,209 | 73.98 | Pratap Singh Khachariyawas | INC | 53,203 | 24.17 | 1,08,006 |
| 56 | Bagru (SC) | Manju Sharma | BJP | 1,32,027 | 60.04 | Pratap Singh Khachariyawas | INC | 83,849 | 38.13 | 48,178 |
Alwar Lok Sabha constituency
| 59 | Tijara | Bhupender Yadav | BJP | 81,477 | 49.38 | Lalit Yadav | INC | 76,392 | 46.30 | 5,085 |
| 60 | Kishangarh Bas | Bhupender Yadav | BJP | 85,433 | 51.81 | Lalit Yadav | INC | 74,926 | 45.44 | 10,507 |
| 61 | Mundawar | Bhupender Yadav | BJP | 69,649 | 50.36 | Lalit Yadav | INC | 65,807 | 47.58 | 3,842 |
| 62 | Behror | Bhupender Yadav | BJP | 78,636 | 56.95 | Lalit Yadav | INC | 56,685 | 41.05 | 22,001 |
| 65 | Alwar Rural (SC) | Lalit Yadav | INC | 82,637 | 53.06 | Bhupender Yadav | BJP | 67,124 | 43.10 | 15,513 |
| 66 | Alwar Urban | Bhupender Yadav | BJP | 1,03,363 | 65.27 | Lalit Yadav | INC | 50,840 | 32.10 | 52,523 |
| 67 | Ramgarh | Lalit Yadav | INC | 83,782 | 48.84 | Bhupender Yadav | BJP | 81,542 | 47.54 | 2,240 |
| 68 | Rajgarh-Laxmangarh (ST) | Lalit Yadav | INC | 84,895 | 58.26 | Bhupender Yadav | BJP | 56,886 | 39.03 | 28,009 |
Bharatpur Lok Sabha constituency
| 69 | Kathumar (SC) | Sanjana Jatav | INC | 66,271 | 52.58 | Ramswaroop Koli | BJP | 57,429 | 45.57 | 8,842 |
| 70 | Kaman | Sanjana Jatav | INC | 1,05,596 | 62.62 | Ramswaroop Koli | BJP | 59,428 | 35.24 | 46,168 |
| 71 | Nagar | Sanjana Jatav | INC | 80,471 | 54.69 | Ramswaroop Koli | BJP | 63,905 | 43.43 | 16,566 |
| 72 | Deeg-Kumher | Sanjana Jatav | INC | 61,747 | 49.97 | Ramswaroop Koli | BJP | 58,878 | 47.64 | 2,869 |
| 73 | Bharatpur | Ramswaroop Koli | BJP | 81,279 | 55.85 | Sanjana Jatav | INC | 60,381 | 41.49 | 20,898 |
| 74 | Nadbai | Ramswaroop Koli | BJP | 75,603 | 55.85 | Sanjana Jatav | INC | 66,519 | 45.83 | 9,084 |
| 75 | Weir (SC) | Sanjana Jatav | INC | 69,482 | 50.82 | Ramswaroop Koli | BJP | 66,040 | 47.77 | 3,442 |
| 76 | Bayana (SC) | Sanjana Jatav | INC | 62,341 | 50.83 | Ramswaroop Koli | BJP | 56,707 | 46.24 | 5,634 |
Karauli-Dholpur Lok Sabha constituency
| 77 | Baseri (SC) | Bhajan Lal Jatav | INC | 59,893 | 57.71 | Indu Devi Jatav | BJP | 40,925 | 39.43 | 18,968 |
| 78 | Bari | Indu Devi Jatav | BJP | 62,683 | 52.85 | Bhajan Lal Jatav | INC | 56,006 | 45.43 | 6,677 |
| 79 | Dholpur | Indu Devi Jatav | BJP | 71,756 | 57.12 | Bhajan Lal Jatav | INC | 49,265 | 39.22 | 22,491 |
| 80 | Rajakhera | Indu Devi Jatav | BJP | 63,588 | 54.78 | Bhajan Lal Jatav | INC | 49,763 | 42.87 | 13,825 |
| 81 | Todabhim (ST) | Bhajan Lal Jatav | INC | 89,123 | 68.42 | Indu Devi Jatav | BJP | 38,441 | 29.51 | 50,682 |
| 82 | Hindaun (SC) | Bhajan Lal Jatav | INC | 76,081 | 55.14 | Indu Devi Jatav | BJP | 59,265 | 42.84 | 16,816 |
| 83 | Karauli | Bhajan Lal Jatav | INC | 68,074 | 56.13 | Indu Devi Jatav | BJP | 50,484 | 41.62 | 17,590 |
| 84 | Sapotra (ST) | Bhajan Lal Jatav | INC | 77,714 | 64.50 | Indu Devi Jatav | BJP | 39,626 | 32.89 | 38,088 |
Dausa Lok Sabha constituency
| 57 | Bassi (ST) | Murari Lal Meena | INC | 74,012 | 51.43 | Kanhaiya Lal Meena | BJP | 67,840 | 43.14 | 6,172 |
| 58 | Chaksu (SC) | Kanhaiya Lal Meena | BJP | 63,220 | 49.44 | Murari Lal Meena | INC | 62,672 | 49.01 | 548 |
| 64 | Thanagazi | Murari Lal Meena | INC | 67,971 | 59.07 | Kanhaiya Lal Meena | BJP | 45,148 | 39.23 | 22,823 |
| 85 | Bandikui | Murari Lal Meena | INC | 78,477 | 59.11 | Kanhaiya Lal Meena | BJP | 52,267 | 39.37 | 26,210 |
| 86 | Mahuwa | Murari Lal Meena | INC | 79,059 | 68.61 | Kanhaiya Lal Meena | BJP | 34,020 | 29.52 | 45,039 |
| 87 | Sikrai (SC) | Murari Lal Meena | INC | 1,02,747 | 70.99 | Kanhaiya Lal Meena | BJP | 39,260 | 27.12 | 63,487 |
| 88 | Dausa | Murari Lal Meena | INC | 90,904 | 61.79 | Kanhaiya Lal Meena | BJP | 54,114 | 36.78 | 36,790 |
| 89 | Lalsot (ST) | Murari Lal Meena | INC | 81,140 | 61.49 | Kanhaiya Lal Meena | BJP | 48,026 | 36.71 | 33,114 |
Tonk-Sawai Madhopur Lok Sabha constituency
| 90 | Gangapur | Harish Chandra Meena | INC | 89,424 | 59.42 | Sukhbir Singh Jaunapuria | BJP | 56,689 | 37.67 | 32,735 |
| 91 | Bamanwas (ST) | Harish Chandra Meena | INC | 75,875 | 58.87 | Sukhbir Singh Jaunapuria | BJP | 47,415 | 36.77 | 28,460 |
| 92 | Sawai Madhopur | Harish Chandra Meena | INC | 84,605 | 55.26 | Sukhbir Singh Jaunapuria | BJP | 55,834 | 38.45 | 28,771 |
| 93 | Khandar (SC) | Harish Chandra Meena | INC | 75,059 | 50.67 | Sukhbir Singh Jaunapuria | BJP | 66,087 | 44.61 | 8,972 |
| 94 | Malpura | Sukhbir Singh Jaunapuria | BJP | 89,683 | 59.28 | Harish Chandra Meena | INC | 56,340 | 37.24 | 33,343 |
| 95 | Niwai (SC) | Sukhbir Singh Jaunapuria | BJP | 77,340 | 50.99 | Harish Chandra Meena | INC | 68,711 | 45.22 | 8,629 |
| 96 | Tonk | Harish Chandra Meena | INC | 79,188 | 50.03 | Sukhbir Singh Jaunapuria | BJP | 74,664 | 47.17 | 4,524 |
| 97 | Deoli-Uniara | Harish Chandra Meena | INC | 87,935 | 48.84 | Sukhbir Singh Jaunapuria | BJP | 85,597 | 47.54 | 2,338 |
Ajmer Lok Sabha constituency
| 45 | Dudu (SC) | Bhagirath Choudhary | BJP | 80,703 | 58.25 | Ramchandra Choudhary | INC | 53,787 | 38.82 | 26,916 |
| 98 | Kishangarh | Bhagirath Choudhary | BJP | 1,07,716 | 63.33 | Ramchandra Choudhary | INC | 56,671 | 33.31 | 51,045 |
| 99 | Pushkar | Bhagirath Choudhary | BJP | 95,780 | 62.62 | Ramchandra Choudhary | INC | 52,244 | 34.15 | 43,536 |
| 100 | Ajmer North | Bhagirath Choudhary | BJP | 88,271 | 64.92 | Ramchandra Choudhary | INC | 45,148 | 33.20 | 43,123 |
| 101 | Ajmer South (SC) | Bhagirath Choudhary | BJP | 83,643 | 62.16 | Ramchandra Choudhary | INC | 48,000 | 35.67 | 35,643 |
| 102 | Nasirabad | Bhagirath Choudhary | BJP | 89,146 | 63.13 | Ramchandra Choudhary | INC | 47,749 | 33.81 | 41,397 |
| 104 | Masuda | Bhagirath Choudhary | BJP | 97,421 | 60.25 | Ramchandra Choudhary | INC | 59,047 | 36.52 | 38,374 |
| 105 | Kekri | Bhagirath Choudhary | BJP | 98,471 | 63.27 | Ramchandra Choudhary | INC | 51,739 | 32.79 | 46,732 |
Nagaur Lok Sabha constituency
| 106 | Ladnun | Jyoti Mirdha | BJP | 67,384 | 46.84 | Hanuman Beniwal | RLP | 66,711 | 46.38 | 673 |
| 107 | Deedwana | Hanuman Beniwal | RLP | 78,272 | 52.58 | Jyoti Mirdha | BJP | 60,149 | 40.40 | 18,123 |
| 108 | Jayal (SC) | Hanuman Beniwal | RLP | 72,309 | 49.76 | Jyoti Mirdha | BJP | 61,825 | 42.54 | 10,484 |
| 109 | Nagaur | Hanuman Beniwal | RLP | 84,782 | 50.94 | Jyoti Mirdha | BJP | 71,861 | 43.18 | 12,921 |
| 110 | Khinwsar | Hanuman Beniwal | RLP | 80,531 | 48.19 | Jyoti Mirdha | BJP | 76,372 | 45.70 | 4,159 |
| 113 | Makrana | Hanuman Beniwal | RLP | 86,383 | 53.13 | Jyoti Mirdha | BJP | 64,383 | 39.60 | 22,000 |
| 114 | Parbatsar | Jyoti Mirdha | BJP | 63,551 | 46.55 | Hanuman Beniwal | RLP | 60,118 | 44.04 | 3,433 |
| 115 | Nawan | Jyoti Mirdha | BJP | 84,979 | 54.00 | Hanuman Beniwal | RLP | 62,354 | 39.62 | 22,625 |
Pali Lok Sabha constituency
| 117 | Sojat (SC) | P.P. Chaudhary | BJP | 1,01,230 | 65.86 | Sangeeta Beniwal | INC | 41,978 | 27.31 | 59,252 |
| 118 | Pali | P.P. Chaudhary | BJP | 99,934 | 58.29 | Sangeeta Beniwal | INC | 63,832 | 37.23 | 36,102 |
| 119 | Marwar Junction | P.P. Chaudhary | BJP | 1,07,479 | 66.71 | Sangeeta Beniwal | INC | 40,687 | 25.25 | 66,792 |
| 120 | Bali | P.P. Chaudhary | BJP | 1,06,562 | 57.63 | Sangeeta Beniwal | INC | 63,283 | 34.22 | 43,279 |
| 121 | Sumerpur | P.P. Chaudhary | BJP | 1,00,711 | 58.51 | Sangeeta Beniwal | INC | 57,048 | 33.14 | 43,363 |
| 125 | Osian | P.P. Chaudhary | BJP | 78,352 | 52.48 | Sangeeta Beniwal | INC | 64,566 | 43.25 | 13,786 |
| 126 | Bhopalgarh (SC) | Sangeeta Beniwal | INC | 95,028 | 55.57 | P.P. Chaudhary | BJP | 67,360 | 39.39 | 27,668 |
| 131 | Bilara (SC) | P.P. Chaudhary | BJP | 88,932 | 50.38 | Sangeeta Beniwal | INC | 79,332 | 44.94 | 9,600 |
Jodhpur Lok Sabha constituency
| 122 | Phalodi | Karan Singh Uchiyarda | INC | 77,833 | 48.81 | Gajendra Singh Shekhawat | BJP | 75,259 | 47.26 | 2,574 |
| 123 | Lohawat | Karan Singh Uchiyarda | INC | 83,994 | 49.32 | Gajendra Singh Shekhawat | BJP | 79,801 | 46.86 | 4,193 |
| 124 | Shergarh | Gajendra Singh Shekhawat | BJP | 84,480 | 49.72 | Karan Singh Uchiyarda | INC | 74,852 | 44.82 | 9,628 |
| 127 | Sardarpura | Gajendra Singh Shekhawat | BJP | 90,005 | 53.77 | Karan Singh Uchiyarda | INC | 74,824 | 44.70 | 15,181 |
| 128 | Jodhpur | Gajendra Singh Shekhawat | BJP | 77,390 | 59.72 | Karan Singh Uchiyarda | INC | 50,661 | 39.08 | 26,729 |
| 129 | Soorsagar | Gajendra Singh Shekhawat | BJP | 1,17,233 | 58.06 | Karan Singh Uchiyarda | INC | 81,585 | 40.40 | 35,648 |
| 130 | Luni | Gajendra Singh Shekhawat | BJP | 1,24,026 | 56.70 | Karan Singh Uchiyarda | INC | 89,151 | 40.76 | 34,875 |
| 133 | Pokaran | Karan Singh Uchiyarda | INC | 75,328 | 48.20 | Gajendra Singh Shekhawat | BJP | 74,784 | 47.85 | 544 |
Barmer Lok Sabha constituency
| 132 | Jaisalmer | Ravindra Singh Bhati | IND | 1,00,963 | 49.22 | Ummeda Ram Beniwal | INC | 67,647 | 32.79 | 33,316 |
| 134 | Sheo | Ravindra Singh Bhati | IND | 1,06,037 | 44.07 | Ummeda Ram Beniwal | INC | 1,04,307 | 43.35 | 2,000 |
| 135 | Barmer | Ummeda Ram Beniwal | INC | 91,451 | 42.99 | Ravindra Singh Bhati | IND | 80,232 | 37.72 | 11,219 |
| 136 | Baytoo | Ummeda Ram Beniwal | INC | 1,36,188 | 64.88 | Ravindra Singh Bhati | IND | 44,604 | 21.25 | 91,584 |
| 137 | Pachpadra | Ravindra Singh Bhati | IND | 66,580 | 37.24 | Kailash Choudhary | BJP | 51,029 | 28.54 | 15,551 |
| 138 | Siwana | Ravindra Singh Bhati | IND | 62,029 | 35.02 | Kailash Choudhary | BJP | 50,482 | 28.50 | 11,517 |
| 139 | Gudamalani | Ummeda Ram Beniwal | INC | 97,229 | 45.76 | Ravindra Singh Bhati | IND | 63,800 | 30.02 | 33,429 |
| 140 | Chohtan (SC) | Ummeda Ram Beniwal | INC | 1,03,638 | 43.69 | Ravindra Singh Bhati | IND | 57,620 | 24.29 | 46,018 |
Jalore Lok Sabha constituency
| 141 | Ahore | Lumbaram Choudhary | BJP | 88,565 | 56.72 | Vaibhav Gehlot | INC | 62,399 | 39.96 | 26,166 |
| 142 | Jalore (SC) | Lumbaram Choudhary | BJP | 1,05,139 | 56.83 | Vaibhav Gehlot | INC | 71,790 | 38.80 | 33,349 |
| 143 | Bhinmal | Lumbaram Choudhary | BJP | 1,15,817 | 59.29 | Vaibhav Gehlot | INC | 71,571 | 36.63 | 44,246 |
| 144 | Sanchore | Lumbaram Choudhary | BJP | 1,06,998 | 50.89 | Vaibhav Gehlot | INC | 96,154 | 45.73 | 10,844 |
| 145 | Raniwara | Lumbaram Choudhary | BJP | 96,591 | 55.08 | Vaibhav Gehlot | INC | 72,044 | 41.08 | 24,547 |
| 146 | Sirohi | Lumbaram Choudhary | BJP | 1,06,090 | 59.26 | Vaibhav Gehlot | INC | 67,899 | 37.93 | 38,191 |
| 147 | Pindwara-Abu (ST) | Lumbaram Choudhary | BJP | 76,997 | 49.80 | Vaibhav Gehlot | INC | 68,223 | 44.13 | 8,774 |
| 148 | Reodar (SC) | Lumbaram Choudhary | BJP | 97,508 | 51.54 | Vaibhav Gehlot | INC | 82,114 | 43.38 | 15,394 |
Udaipur Lok Sabha constituency
| 149 | Gogunda (ST) | Mannalal Rawat | BJP | 97,147 | 55.66 | Tarachand Meena | INC | 62,301 | 35.96 | 34,846 |
| 150 | Jhadol (ST) | Mannalal Rawat | BJP | 89,062 | 42.90 | Tarachand Meena | INC | 84,272 | 40.60 | 4,790 |
| 151 | Kherwara (ST) | Tarachand Meena | INC | 97,476 | 51.03 | Mannalal Rawat | BJP | 65,219 | 34.14 | 32,257 |
| 152 | Udaipur Rural (ST) | Mannalal Rawat | BJP | 1,24,116 | 61.36 | Tarachand Meena | INC | 58,293 | 28.81 | 65,823 |
| 153 | Udaipur | Mannalal Rawat | BJP | 1,10,622 | 67.69 | Tarachand Meena | INC | 49,285 | 30.25 | 61,337 |
| 156 | Salumber (ST) | Mannalal Rawat | BJP | 93,373 | 50.08 | Tarachand Meena | INC | 54,434 | 29.19 | 38,939 |
| 157 | Dhariawad (ST) | Mannalal Rawat | BJP | 89,771 | 46.64 | Prakash Chand | BAP | 52,828 | 27.45 | 36,943 |
| 159 | Aspur (ST) | Prakash Chand | BAP | 70,865 | 41.62 | Mannalal Rawat | BJP | 63,447 | 37.27 | 7,418 |
Banswara Lok Sabha constituency
| 158 | Dungarpur (ST) | Rajkumar Roat | BAP | 97,364 | 54.99 | Mahendrajeet Singh Malviya | BJP | 45,081 | 25.46 | 52,283 |
| 160 | Sagwara (ST) | Rajkumar Roat | BAP | 1,00,557 | 51.46 | Mahendrajeet Singh Malviya | BJP | 72,555 | 37.15 | 28,002 |
| 161 | Chorasi (ST) | Rajkumar Roat | BAP | 1,03,099 | 57.30 | Mahendrajeet Singh Malviya | BJP | 47,201 | 26.23 | 55,898 |
| 162 | Ghatol (ST) | Rajkumar Roat | BAP | 1,28,167 | 54.05 | Mahendrajeet Singh Malviya | BJP | 73,768 | 31.10 | 54,939 |
| 163 | Garhi (ST) | Rajkumar Roat | BAP | 97,454 | 44.05 | Mahendrajeet Singh Malviya | BJP | 96,200 | 43.48 | 1,254 |
| 164 | Banswara (ST) | Mahendrajeet Singh Malviya | BJP | 96,911 | 43.83 | Rajkumar Roat | BAP | 91,428 | 43.62 | 483 |
| 165 | Bagidora (ST) | Rajkumar Roat | BAP | 99,469 | 48.03 | Mahendrajeet Singh Malviya | BJP | 71,654 | 34.52 | 27,815 |
| 166 | Kushalgarh (ST) | Rajkumar Roat | BAP | 92,892 | 49.78 | Mahendrajeet Singh Malviya | BJP | 65,219 | 34.95 | 27,673 |
Chittorgarh Lok Sabha constituency
| 154 | Mavli | Chandra Prakash Joshi | BJP | 1,20,370 | 68.37 | Udailal Anjana | INC | 46,280 | 26.48 | 74,090 |
| 155 | Vallabhnagar | Chandra Prakash Joshi | BJP | 1,11,493 | 67.61 | Udailal Anjana | INC | 44,406 | 26.93 | 67,087 |
| 167 | Kapasan (SC) | Chandra Prakash Joshi | BJP | 1,02,628 | 57.92 | Udailal Anjana | INC | 65,571 | 37.01 | 37,057 |
| 168 | Begun | Chandra Prakash Joshi | BJP | 1,16,710 | 59.08 | Udailal Anjana | INC | 71,151 | 36.02 | 45,559 |
| 169 | Chittorgarh | Chandra Prakash Joshi | BJP | 1,04,043 | 58.11 | Udailal Anjana | INC | 67,617 | 37.76 | 36,426 |
| 170 | Nimbahera | Chandra Prakash Joshi | BJP | 1,12,440 | 53.39 | Udailal Anjana | INC | 89,200 | 42.35 | 23,240 |
| 171 | Bari Sadri | Chandra Prakash Joshi | BJP | 1,13,253 | 59.71 | Udailal Anjana | INC | 60,713 | 32.01 | 52,540 |
| 172 | Pratapgarh (ST) | Chandra Prakash Joshi | BJP | 1,01,397 | 52.26 | Udailal Anjana | INC | 50,239 | 25.89 | 51,158 |
Rajsamand Lok Sabha constituency
| 103 | Beawar | Mahima Kumari Mewar | BJP | 1,15,866 | 72.42 | Damodar Gurjar | INC | 40,175 | 25.11 | 75,691 |
| 111 | Merta (SC) | Damodar Gurjar | INC | 82,347 | 49.70 | Mahima Kumari Mewar | BJP | 79,385 | 47.81 | 2,962 |
| 112 | Degana | Mahima Kumari Mewar | BJP | 72,013 | 49.70 | Damodar Gurjar | INC | 68,285 | 47.13 | 3,728 |
| 116 | Jaitaran | Mahima Kumari Mewar | BJP | 1,11,931 | 65.71 | Damodar Gurjar | INC | 52,171 | 30.62 | 59,220 |
| 173 | Bhim | Mahima Kumari Mewar | BJP | 1,00,446 | 76.21 | Damodar Gurjar | INC | 24,338 | 18.46 | 76,108 |
| 174 | Kumbhalgarh | Mahima Kumari Mewar | BJP | 88,386 | 70.73 | Damodar Gurjar | INC | 30,271 | 24.22 | 58,115 |
| 175 | Rajsamand | Mahima Kumari Mewar | BJP | 1,03,054 | 70.12 | Damodar Gurjar | INC | 39,575 | 26.22 | 63,479 |
| 176 | Nathdwara | Mahima Kumari Mewar | BJP | 1,03,712 | 65.87 | Damodar Gurjar | INC | 48,197 | 30.61 | 55,515 |
Bhilwara Lok Sabha constituency
| 177 | Asind | Damodar Agarwal | BJP | 1,10,777 | 61.35 | C.P. Joshi | INC | 64,177 | 35.54 | 46,600 |
| 178 | Mandal | Damodar Agarwal | BJP | 1,12,690 | 66.52 | C.P. Joshi | INC | 50,978 | 30.09 | 61,712 |
| 179 | Sahara | Damodar Agarwal | BJP | 89,933 | 63.28 | C.P. Joshi | INC | 45,918 | 32.30 | 45,015 |
| 180 | Bhilwara | Damodar Agarwal | BJP | 1,27,318 | 69.62 | C.P. Joshi | INC | 52,847 | 28.89 | 74,471 |
| 181 | Shahpura | Damodar Agarwal | BJP | 1,00,103 | 63.77 | C.P. Joshi | INC | 51,168 | 32.59 | 48,935 |
| 182 | Jahazpur | Damodar Agarwal | BJP | 86,161 | 57.53 | C.P. Joshi | INC | 58,457 | 39.03 | 27,704 |
| 183 | Mandalgarh | Damodar Agarwal | BJP | 94,383 | 61.85 | C.P. Joshi | INC | 51,641 | 33.84 | 42,742 |
| 184 | Hindoli | Damodar Agarwal | BJP | 81,826 | 50.59 | C.P. Joshi | INC | 74,342 | 45.96 | 7,484 |
Kota Lok Sabha constituency
| 185 | Keshoraipatan (SC) | Prahlad Gunjal | INC | 1,03,896 | 54.01 | Om Birla | BJP | 81,501 | 42.37 | 22,395 |
| 186 | Bundi | Om Birla | BJP | 1,16,101 | 51.78 | Prahlad Gunjal | INC | 1,00,995 | 45.05 | 15,106 |
| 187 | Pipalda | Prahlad Gunjal | INC | 82,029 | 55.77 | Om Birla | BJP | 59,699 | 40.59 | 22,330 |
| 188 | Sangod | Om Birla | BJP | 77,497 | 50.33 | Prahlad Gunjal | INC | 72,166 | 46.87 | 25,586 |
| 189 | Kota North | Prahlad Gunjal | INC | 94,878 | 52.15 | Om Birla | BJP | 83,560 | 47.93 | 11,318 |
| 190 | Kota South | Om Birla | BJP | 1,05,645 | 58.93 | Prahlad Gunjal | INC | 69,997 | 39.05 | 35,648 |
| 191 | Ladpura | Om Birla | BJP | 1,14,066 | 52.35 | Prahlad Gunjal | INC | 99,051 | 45.46 | 15,015 |
| 192 | Ramganj Mandi (SC) | Om Birla | BJP | 1,06,327 | 55.58 | Prahlad Gunjal | INC | 79,611 | 41.61 | 26,716 |
Jhalawar-Baran Lok Sabha constituency
| 193 | Anta | Dushyant Singh | BJP | 79,774 | 49.64 | Urmila Jain Bhaya | INC | 68,867 | 45.09 | 10,907 |
| 194 | Kishanganj (ST) | Dushyant Singh | BJP | 81,226 | 49.90 | Urmila Jain Bhaya | INC | 74,992 | 46.07 | 6,234 |
| 195 | Baran-Atru (SC) | Dushyant Singh | BJP | 95,524 | 55.70 | Urmila Jain Bhaya | INC | 70,885 | 41.34 | 24,639 |
| 196 | Chhabra | Dushyant Singh | BJP | 1,07,174 | 62.97 | Urmila Jain Bhaya | INC | 54,965 | 34.29 | 52,209 |
| 197 | Dag (SC) | Dushyant Singh | BJP | 1,20,945 | 64.62 | Urmila Jain Bhaya | INC | 56,845 | 30.37 | 64,100 |
| 198 | Jhalrapatan | Dushyant Singh | BJP | 1,35,531 | 64.75 | Urmila Jain Bhaya | INC | 63,371 | 30.31 | 72,160 |
| 199 | Khanpur | Dushyant Singh | BJP | 1,07,693 | 62.68 | Urmila Jain Bhaya | INC | 57,252 | 33.32 | 50,441 |
| 200 | Manohar Thana | Dushyant Singh | BJP | 1,33,986 | 70.30 | Urmila Jain Bhaya | INC | 45,165 | 27.31 | 88,821 |

== Assembly segments wise lead of Parties ==
2024 Rajasthan Lok Sabha Elections Assembly Wise Lead Map

| Party | Assembly segments | Position in Assembly (as of 2023 election) |
|---|---|---|
| Bharatiya Janata Party | 107 | 119 |
| Indian National Congress | 70 | 66 |
| Communist Party of India (Marxist) | 6 | 0 |
| Bharat Adivasi Party | 8 | 4 |
| Rashtriya Loktantrik Party | 5 | 0 |
| Others | 4 | 11 |
| Total | 200 | |

== See also ==
- 2024 Indian general election in Sikkim
- 2024 indian general election in Punjab
- 2024 Indian general election in Tamil Nadu
- 2024 Indian general election in Telangana
