= Madan Dilawar =

Indian politician (born 1959)

Cabinet Minister, Government of Rajasthan
- Incumbent
- Assumed office 30 December 2023
- Governor: Kalraj Mishra; Haribhau Bagade
- Chief Minister: Bhajan Lal Sharma
- Ministry and Departments: List: School Education; Panchayati Raj; Sanskrit Education
- Preceded by: Bulaki Das Kalla

Cabinet Minister, Government of Rajasthan
- In office 8 December 2003 – 10 December 2008
- Chief Minister: Vasundhara Raje
- Ministry and Departments: List: Social Welfare; Cooperative

Minister of State, Government of Rajasthan
- In office 11 December 1993 – 30 November 1998
- Chief Minister: Bhairon Singh Shekhawat
- Ministry and Departments: List: Social Welfare

Member of the Rajasthan Legislative Assembly
- Incumbent
- Assumed office 2018
- Preceded by: Chandrakanta Meghwal
- Constituency: Ramganj Mandi

Member of the Rajasthan Legislative Assembly
- In office 1990–2008
- Constituency: Atru

General Secretary, Bharatiya Janata Party Rajasthan
- In office 2020–2022
- President: Satish Poonia

Personal details
- Born: 11 May 1959 (age 67) Aradana, Atru, Baran, Rajasthan, India
- Party: Bharatiya Janata Party
- Spouse: Suraj Dilawar
- Children: 3
- Education: Diploma in Mechanical Engineering
- Profession: Agriculture

Madan Dilawar (born 11 May 1959) is an Indian politician from Rajasthan who is currently serving as a Cabinet Minister in the Government of Rajasthan, handling the portfolios of School Education, Panchayati Raj, and Sanskrit Education. He is a senior leader of the Bharatiya Janata Party (BJP) and a member of the Rajasthan Legislative Assembly representing the Ramganj Mandi.

He previously represented the Atru constituency for multiple terms between 1990 and 2008 and has held several ministerial positions, including in the governments of Bhairon Singh Shekhawat and Vasundhara Raje.

== Early life ==
Madan Dilawar was born in the village of Aradana, Atru in Baran district. He actively participated in the Ram Mandir movement in 1990.

== Political career ==
Madan Dilawar began his legislative career by being elected to the Rajasthan Legislative Assembly from the Atru seat in the 1990 Rajasthan Legislative Assembly election, securing 33,681 votes and defeating INC candidate Ram Charan by a significant margin. He was re-elected from Atru in the subsequent elections of 1993, 1998, and 2003, defeating Indian National Congress candidates each time, including Hanuman Prasad and Madan Maharaja.

During his tenure, he held key positions such as Minister of State (1993–1998) under Chief Minister Bhairon Singh Shekhawat, handling the Social Welfare Department, and later served as a Cabinet Minister (2003–2008) in the First Raje ministry led by Vasundhara Raje, overseeing the Social Welfare and Cooperative departments.

After a hiatus from 2008 to 2018, Dilawar made a comeback in the 2018 Rajasthan Legislative Assembly election, this time contesting from the Ramganj Mandi seat. He won the seat by defeating INC candidate Ramgopal by 12,879 votes. He was re-elected in the 2023 Rajasthan Legislative Assembly election, defeating Congress's Mahendra Rajoriya by 18,422 votes.

In December 2023, he was inducted into the state cabinet under Chief Minister Bhajan Lal Sharma and entrusted with the portfolios of School Education, Panchayati Raj, and Sanskrit Education.

== Electoral record ==
Election results
Year	Office	Constituency	Party	Votes for Madan Dilawar	%	Opponent	Party	Votes	%	Result	Ref
2023	MLA	Ramganj Mandi	BJP	1,03,504	52.99	Mahendra Rajoriya	INC	85,082	43.56	Won	
2018	MLA	Ramganj Mandi	BJP	90,817	51.45	Ramgopal	INC	77,938	44.15	Won	
2003	MLA	Atru	BJP	53,433	55.85	Madan Maharaja	INC	42,245	44.15	Won	
1998	MLA	Atru	BJP	36,766	47.4	Madan Maharaja	INC	33,437	43.11	Won	
1993	MLA	Atru	BJP	38,046	52.45	Hanuman Prasad	INC	32,919	45.38	Won	
1990	MLA	Atru	BJP	33,681	59.92	Ram Charan	INC	16,235	28.88	Won	
