= Election schedule of the 2024 Indian general election =

Indian lower house election schedule

2024 Lok Sabha Election Schedule

This is the detailed election schedule of the 2024 Indian general election.

== Schedule ==
The election schedule for the 18th Lok Sabha was announced by the Election Commission of India on 16 March 2024 and with it the Model Code of Conduct came into effect. The tenure of the 17th Lok Sabha was scheduled to end on 16 June 2024.

=== Date summary ===
Poll event	Phase						
Poll event	1	2	3	4	5	6	7
Notification date	20 March	28 March	12 April	18 April	26 April	29 April	7 May
Last date for filing nomination	27 March	4 April	19 April	25 April	3 May	6 May	14 May
Scrutiny of nomination	28 March	5 April	20 April	26 April	4 May	7 May	15 May
Last date for withdrawal of nomination	30 March	8 April	22 April	29 April	6 May	9 May	17 May
Date of poll	19 April	26 April	7 May	13 May	20 May	25 May	1 June
Date of counting of votes	4 June 2024						
No. of constituencies	101 1/2 (Note: Polling in Outer Manipur constituency in Manipur was scheduled in two phases.)	87 1/2	94	96	49	58	57

=== Seat summary ===
Phase-wise polling constituencies in each state
State/Union territory	Total constituencies	Election dates and number of constituencies						
State/Union territory	Total constituencies	Phase 1	Phase 2	Phase 3	Phase 4	Phase 5	Phase 6	Phase 7
State/Union territory	Total constituencies	19 April	26 April	7 May	13 May	20 May	25 May	1 June
Andhra Pradesh	25				25			
Arunachal Pradesh	2	2						
Assam	14	5	5	4				
Bihar	40	4	5	5	5	5	8	8
Chhattisgarh	11	1	3	7				
Goa	2			2				
Gujarat	26			26				
Haryana	10						10	
Himachal Pradesh	4							4
Jharkhand	14				4	3	4	3
Karnataka	28		14	14				
Kerala	20		20					
Madhya Pradesh	29	6	6 (Note: Polling in Betul constituency in Madhya Pradesh was rescheduled from 26 April 2024 (Phase 2) to 7 May 2024 (Phase 3) due to death of BSP candidate.)	9	8			
Maharashtra	48	5	8	11	11	13		
Manipur	2	1 1/2	1/2					
Meghalaya	2	2						
Mizoram	1	1						
Nagaland	1	1						
Odisha	21				4	5	6	6
Punjab	13							13
Rajasthan	25	12	13					
Sikkim	1	1						
Tamil Nadu	39	39						
Telangana	17				17			
Tripura	2	1	1					
Uttar Pradesh	80	8	8	10	13	14	14	13
Uttarakhand	5	5						
West Bengal	42	3	3	4	8	7	8	9
Andaman and Nicobar Islands	1	1						
Chandigarh	1							1
Dadra and Nagar Haveli and Daman and Diu	2			2				
Delhi	7						7	
Jammu and Kashmir	5	1	1		1	1	1 (Note: Polling in Anantnag–Rajouri constituency in Jammu and Kashmir was rescheduled from 7 May 2024 (Phase 3) to 25 May 2024 (Phase 6) due to weather conditions.)	
Ladakh	1					1		
Lakshadweep	1	1						
Puducherry	1	1						
Total constituencies	543	101 1/2	87 1/2	94	96	49	58	57
Total constituencies by end of phase	–	101 1/2	189	284	379	428	486	543
Percentage complete by end of phase	–	18.7	34.8	52.3	69.8	78.8	89.5	100

== Andaman and Nicobar Islands ==
Poll event	Phase
Poll event	I
Notification date	20 March 2024
Last date for filing nomination	27 March 2024
Scrutiny of nomination	28 March 2024
Last Date for withdrawal of nomination	30 March 2024
Date of poll	19 April 2024
Date of counting of votes/Result	4 June 2024
No. of constituencies	1

== Andhra Pradesh ==
Poll event	Phase
Poll event	IV
Notification date	18 April
Last date for filing nomination	25 April
Scrutiny of nomination	26 April
Last Date for withdrawal of nomination	29 April
Date of poll	13 May
Date of counting of votes/Result	4 June
No. of constituencies	25

== Arunachal Pradesh ==
Poll event	Phase
Poll event	I
Notification date	20 March
Last date for filing nomination	27 March
Scrutiny of nomination	28 March
Last Date for withdrawal of nomination	30 March
Date of poll	19 April
Date of counting of votes/Result	4 June 2024
No. of constituencies	2

== Assam ==
Poll event	Phase		
Poll event	I	II	III
Notification date	20 March	28 March	12 April
Last date for filing nomination	27 March	4 April	19 April
Scrutiny of nomination	28 March	5 April	20 April
Last Date for withdrawal of nomination	30 March	8 April	22 April
Date of poll	19 April	26 April	7 May
Date of counting of votes/Result	4 June 2024		
No. of constituencies	5	5	4

== Bihar ==
Phase wise schedule of 2024 Indian general election in Bihar

Poll event	Phase						
Poll event	I	II	III	IV	V	VI	VII
Notification date	20 March	28 March	12 April	18 April	26 April	29 April	7 May
Last date for filing nomination	28 March	4 April	19 April	25 April	3 May	6 May	14 May
Scrutiny of nomination	30 March	5 April	20 April	26 April	4 May	7 May	15 May
Last Date for withdrawal of nomination	02 March	8 April	22 April	29 April	6 May	9 May	17 May
Date of poll	19 April	26 April	7 May	13 May	20 May	25 May	1 June
Date of counting of votes/Result	4 June 2024						
No. of constituencies	4	5	5	5	5	8	8

Constituencies in each phase
Phase	Poll date	Constituencies	Voter turnout (%)
I	19 April	Aurangabad, Gaya, Nawada, Jamui	49.26%
II	26 April	Kishanganj, Purnia, Katihar, Bhagalpur, Banka	59.45%
III	7 May	Jhanjarpur, Supaul, Araria, Madhepura, Khagaria	
IV	13 May	Darbhanga, Ujiarpur, Samastipur, Begusarai, Munger	
V	20 May	Sitamarhi, Madhubani, Muzaffarpur, Saran, Hajipur	
VI	25 May	Valmiki Nagar, Paschim Champaran, Purvi Champaran, Sheohar, Vaishali, Gopalganj, Siwan, Maharajganj	
VII	1 June	Nalanda, Patna Sahib, Pataliputra, Arrah, Buxar, Sasaram, Karakat, Jahanabad	

== Chandigarh ==
Poll event	Phase
Poll event	VII
Notification date	7 May
Last date for filing nomination	14 May
Scrutiny of nomination	15 May
Last Date for withdrawal of nomination	17 May
Date of poll	1 June
Date of counting of votes/Result	4 June 2024
No. of constituencies	1

== Chhattisgarh ==
On 16 March 2024, the Election Commission of India announced the schedule of the 2024 Indian general election, with Chhattisgarh scheduled to vote during the first 3 phases starting from 19 April and concluding on 7 May 2024.

Phase wise schedule of 2024 Indian general election in Chhattisgarh Phase 1 Phase 2 Phase 3

Poll event	Phase		
Poll event	I	II	III
Notification date	20 March	28 March	12 April
Last date for filing nomination	27 March	4 April	19 April
Scrutiny of nomination	28 March	5 April	20 April
Last Date for withdrawal of nomination	30 March	8 April	22 April
Date of poll	19 April	26 April	7 May
Date of counting of votes/Result	4 June 2024		
No. of constituencies	1	3	7

== Dadra and Nagar Haveli and Daman and Diu ==
Poll event	Phase
Poll event	III
Notification date	12 April 2024
Last date for filing nomination	19 April 2024
Scrutiny of nomination	20 April 2024
Last Date for withdrawal of nomination	22 April 2024
Date of poll	7 May 2024
Date of counting of votes/Result	4 June 2024
No. of constituencies	2

== Delhi ==
On 16 March 2024, the Election Commission of India announced the schedule of the 2024 Indian general election, with Delhi scheduled to vote during the 6th phase on 25 May 2024.

Poll event	Phase
Poll event	VI
Notification date	29 April
Last date for filing nomination	6 May
Scrutiny of nomination	7 May
Last Date for withdrawal of nomination	9 May
Date of poll	25 May
Date of counting of votes/Result	4 June 2024
No. of constituencies	7

== Goa ==
Poll event	Phase
Poll event	III
Notification date	12 April 2024
Last date for filing nomination	19 April 2024
Scrutiny of nomination	20 April 2024
Last Date for withdrawal of nomination	22 April 2024
Date of poll	7 May 2024
Date of counting of votes/Result	4 June 2024
No. of constituencies	2

== Gujarat ==
Poll event	Phase
Poll event	III
Notification date	12 April
Last date for filing nomination	19 April
Scrutiny of nomination	20 April
Last Date for withdrawal of nomination	22 April
Date of poll	7 May
Date of counting of votes/Result	4 June 2024
No. of constituencies	26

== Haryana ==
Poll event	Phase
Poll event	VI
Notification date	29 April
Last date for filing nomination	6 May
Scrutiny of nomination	7 May
Last Date for withdrawal of nomination	9 May
Date of poll	25 May
Date of counting of votes/Result	4 June 2024
No. of constituencies	10

== Himachal Pradesh ==
Poll event	Phase
Poll event	VII
Notification date	7 May
Last date for filing nomination	14 May
Scrutiny of nomination	15 May
Last Date for withdrawal of nomination	17 May
Date of poll	1 June
Date of counting of votes/Result	4 June 2024
No. of constituencies	4

== Jammu and Kashmir ==
Poll event	Phase				
Poll event	I	II	III	IV	V
Notification date	20 March	28 March	12 April	18 April	26 April
Last date for filing nomination	27 March	4 April	19 April	25 April	3 May
Scrutiny of nomination	28 March	5 April	20 April	26 April	4 May
Last Date for withdrawal of nomination	30 March	8 April	22 April	29 April	6 May
Date of poll	19 April	26 April	25 May (Note: Polling in Anantnag-Rajouri constituency in J&K was rescheduled from 7 May 2024 (Phase 3) to 25 May 2024 (Phase 6) due to weather conditions.)	13 May	20 May
Date of counting of votes/Result	4 June 2024				
No. of constituencies	1	1	1	1	1

=== Constituencies in phases ===
Phase	Poll date	Constituencies	Voter turnout (%)
I	19 April	Udhampur	68.27 %
II	26 April	Jammu	72.22%
IV	13 May	Srinagar	
V	20 May	Baramulla	
VI	25 May	Anantnag–Rajouri	

== Jharkhand ==
Phase wise schedule of 2024 Indian general election in Jharkhand

Poll event	Phase			
Poll event	IV	V	VI	VII
Notification date	18 April	26 April	29 April	7 May
Last date for filing nomination	25 April	3 May	6 May	14 May
Scrutiny of nomination	26 April	4 May	7 May	15 May
Last Date for withdrawal of nomination	29 April	6 May	9 May	17 May
Date of poll	13 May	20 May	25 May	1 June
Date of counting of votes/Result	4 June 2024			
No. of constituencies	4	3	4	3

== Karnataka ==
Phase wise schedule of 2024 Indian general election in Karnataka

Poll event	Phase	
Poll event	II	III
Notification date	28 March	12 April
Last date for filing nomination	4 April	19 April
Scrutiny of nomination	5 April	20 April
Last Date for withdrawal of nomination	8 April	22 April
Date of poll	26 April	7 May
Date of counting of votes/Result	4 June 2024	
No. of constituencies	14	14

=== Constituencies in phases ===
Phase	Poll date	Constituencies	Voter turnout (%)
II	26 April 2024	Udupi Chikmagalur, Hassan, Dakshina Kannada, Chitradurga, Tumkur, Mandya, Mysore, Chamarajanagar, Bangalore Rural, Bangalore North, Bangalore Central, Bangalore South, Chikkballapur, Kolar	69.56%
III	7 May 2024	Chikkodi, Belgaum, Bagalkot, Bijapur, Gulbarga, Raichur, Bidar, Koppal, Bellary, Haveri, Dharwad, Uttara Kannada, Davanagere, Shimoga	

== Kerala ==
Poll event
Phase	II
Notification date	28 March
Last date for filing nomination	04 April
Scrutiny of nomination	05 April
Last Date for withdrawal of nomination	08 April
Date of poll	26 April
Date of counting of votes/Result	04 June
No. of constituencies	20

== Ladakh ==
Poll event	Phase
Poll event	V
Notification date	26 April 2024
Last date for filing nomination	3 May 2024
Scrutiny of nomination	4 May 2024
Last Date for withdrawal of nomination	6 May 2024
Date of poll	20 May 2024
Date of counting of votes/Result	4 June 2024

== Lakshadweep ==
Poll event	Phase
Poll event	I
Notification date	20 March 2024
Last date for filing nomination	27 March 2024
Scrutiny of nomination	28 March 2024
Last Date for withdrawal of nomination	30 March 2024
Date of poll	19 April 2024
Date of counting of votes/Result	4 June 2024
No. of constituencies	1

== Madhya Pradesh ==
On 16th March 2024, the Election Commission of India announced the schedule for the 2024 Indian general election, with Madhya Pradesh scheduled to vote during the first four phases on 19, 26 April, 7 and 13 May.

Schedule of 2024 Indian general election in Madhya Pradesh, along with the voter turnout for each phase. Phase 1 Phase 2 Phase 3 Phase 4

Poll event	Phase			
Poll event	I	II	III	IV
Notification date	20 March	28 March	12 April	18 April
Last date for filing nomination	27 March	4 April	19 April	25 April
Scrutiny of nomination	28 March	5 April	20 April	26 April
Last Date for withdrawal of nomination	30 March	8 April	22 April	29 April
Date of poll	19 April	26 April	7 May	13 May
Date of counting of votes/Result	4 June 2024			
No. of constituencies	6	6	9	8

== Maharashtra ==
On 16th March 2024, the Election Commission of India announced the schedule for the 2024 Indian general election, with Maharashtra scheduled to vote during the first five phases on 19, 26 April, 7, 13 and 20 May.

Phase wise schedule of 2024 Indian general election in Maharashtra Phase I Phase II Phase III Phase IV Phase V

Poll event	Phase				
Poll event	I	II	III	IV	V
Notification date	20 March	28 March	12 April	18 April	26 April
Last date for filing nomination	27 March	4 April	19 April	25 April	3 May
Scrutiny of nomination	28 March	5 April	20 April	26 April	4 May
Last Date for withdrawal of nomination	30 March	8 April	22 April	29 April	6 May
Date of poll	19 April	26 April	7 May	13 May	20 May
Date of counting of votes/Result	4 June 2024				
No. of constituencies	5	8	11	11	13

=== Constituencies in each phase ===
Phase	Poll date	Constituencies	Voter turnout (%)
I	19 April	Ramtek, Nagpur, Bhandara–Gondiya, Gadchiroli–Chimur, Chandrapur	63.71%
II	26 April	Buldhana, Akola, Amravati, Wardha, Yavatmal–Washim, Hingoli, Nanded, Parbhani	62.71%
III	7 May	Raigad, Baramati, Osmanabad, Latur, Solapur, Madha, Sangli, Satara, Ratnagiri–Sindhudurg, Kolhapur, Hatkanangle	61.05%
IV	13 May	Nandurbar, Jalgaon, Raver, Jalna, Aurangabad, Maval, Pune, Shirur, Ahmednagar, Shirdi, Beed	
V	20 May	Dhule, Dindori, Nashik, Palghar, Bhiwandi, Kalyan, Thane, Mumbai North, Mumbai North West, Mumbai North East, Mumbai North Central, Mumbai South Central, Mumbai South	

== Manipur ==
Poll event	Phase	
Poll event	I	II
Notification date	20 March	28 March
Last date for filing nomination	27 March	4 April
Scrutiny of nomination	28 March	5 April
Last Date for withdrawal of nomination	30 March	8 April
Date of poll	19 April	26 April
Date of counting of votes/Result	4 June 2024	
No. of constituencies	1 1/2 (Note: Polling in Outer Manipur constituency in Manipur was scheduled in two phases.)	1/2

== Meghalaya ==
Poll event	Phase
Poll event	I
Notification date	20 March
Last date for filing nomination	27 March
Scrutiny of nomination	28 March
Last Date for withdrawal of nomination	30 March
Date of poll	19 April
Date of counting of votes/Result	4 June 2024
No. of constituencies	2

== Mizoram ==
Poll event	Phase
Poll event	I
Notification date	20 March
Last date for filing nomination	27 March
Scrutiny of nomination	28 March
Last Date for withdrawal of nomination	30 March
Date of poll	19 April
Date of counting of votes/Result	4 June 2024
No. of constituencies	1

== Nagaland ==
Poll event	Phase
Poll event	I
Notification date	20 March 2024
Last date for filing nomination	27 March 2024
Scrutiny of nomination	28 March 2024
Last Date for withdrawal of nomination	30 March 2024
Date of poll	19 April 2024
Date of counting of votes/Result	4 June 2024
No. of constituencies	1

== Odisha ==
Schedule of 2024 Indian general election in Odisha for each constituency

=== Constituencies wise poll dates ===
Phase	Date	Constituencies
IV	13 May	Kalahandi, Nabarangpur (ST), Berhampur, Koraput (ST)
V	20 May	Bargarh, Sundargarh (ST), Bolangir, Kandhamal, Aska
VI	25 May	Sambalpur, Keonjhar (ST), Dhenkanal, Cuttack, Puri, Bhubaneswar
VII	1 June	Mayurbhanj (ST), Balasore, Bhadrak (SC), Jajpur (SC), Kendrapara, Jagatsinghpur (SC)

== Puducherry ==
Poll event	Phase
Poll event	I
Notification date	20 March
Last date for filing nomination	27 March
Scrutiny of nomination	28 March
Last Date for withdrawal of nomination	30 March
Date of poll	19 April
Date of counting of votes/Result	4 June 2024
No. of constituencies	1

== Punjab ==
The election schedule was announced by Election Commission of India on 16 March 2024. The elections are to be held in seven phases throughout the country, with Punjab in the last phase.

Poll event	Phase
Poll event	VII
Notification date	7 May
Last date for filing nomination	14 May
Scrutiny of nomination	15 May
Last Date for withdrawal of nomination	17 May
Date of poll	1 June
Date of counting of votes/Result	4 June 2024
No. of constituencies	13

== Rajasthan ==
On 16 March 2024, the Election Commission of India announced the schedule for the 2024 Indian general election, with Rajasthan scheduled to vote during the first two phases on 19 April and 26 April.

Phase wise schedule of 2024 Indian general election in Rajasthan Phase 1 Phase 2

Poll event	Phase	
Poll event	I	II
Notification date	20 March	28 March
Last date for filing nomination	27 March	4 April
Scrutiny of nomination	28 March	5 April
Last Date for withdrawal of nomination	30 March	8 April
Date of poll	19 April	26 April
Date of counting of votes/Result	4 June 2024	
No. of constituencies	12	13

=== Constituencies in each phase ===
Phase	Poll date	Constituencies	Voter turnout (%)
I	19 April	Ganganagar, Bikaner, Churu, Jhunjhunu, Sikar, Jaipur Rural, Jaipur, Alwar, Bharatpur, Karauli–Dholpur, Dausa, Nagaur	57.65%
II	26 April	Tonk–Sawai Madhopur, Ajmer, Pali, Jodhpur, Barmer, Jalore, Udaipur, Banswara, Chittorgarh, Rajsamand, Bhilwara, Kota, Jhalawar–Baran	65.03%

== Sikkim ==
Poll event	Phase
Poll event	I
Notification date	20 March
Last date for filing nomination	27 March
Scrutiny of nomination	28 March
Last Date for withdrawal of nomination	30 March
Date of poll	19 April
Date of counting of votes/Result	4 June 2024
No. of constituencies	1

== Tamil Nadu ==
Poll event	Phase
Poll event	I
Notification date	20 March
Last date for filing nomination	27 March
Scrutiny of nomination	28 March
Last Date for withdrawal of nomination	30 March
Date of poll	19 April
Date of counting of votes/Result	4 June 2024
No. of constituencies	39

== Telangana ==
Poll event	Phase
Poll event	IV
Notification date	18 April 2024
Last date for filing nomination	25 April 2024
Scrutiny of nomination	26 April 2024
Last Date for withdrawal of nomination	29 April 2024
Date of poll	13 May 2024
Date of counting of votes/Result	4 June 2024
No. of constituencies	17

== Tripura ==
Poll event	Phase	
Poll event	I	II
Notification date	20 March	28 March
Last date for filing nomination	27 March	4 April
Scrutiny of nomination	28 March	5 April
Last Date for withdrawal of nomination	30 March	8 April
Date of poll	19 April	26 April
Date of counting of votes/Result	4 June 2024	
No. of constituencies	1	1

=== Constituencies in phases ===
Phase	Poll date	Constituencies	Voter turnout (%)
I	19 April 2024	Tripura West	
II	26 April 2024	Tripura East	

== Uttar Pradesh ==
Schedule of 2024 Indian general election in Uttar Pradesh for each constituency

=== Constituencies wise poll dates ===
Phase	Date	Constituencies
I	19 April	Saharanpur, Kairana, Muzaffarnagar, Bijnor, Nagina, Moradabad, Rampur, Pilibhit
II	26 April	Amroha, Meerut, Baghpat, Ghaziabad, Gautam Buddha Nagar, Bulandshahr, Aligarh, Mathura
III	7 May	Sambhal, Hathras, Agra, Fatehpur Sikri, Firozabad, Mainpuri, Etah, Badaun, Bareilly, Aonla
IV	13 May	Shahjahanpur, Kheri, Dhaurahra, Sitapur, Hardoi, Misrikh, Unnao, Farrukhabad, Etawah, Kannauj, Kanpur, Akbarpur, Bahraich
V	20 May	Mohanlalganj, Lucknow, Raebareli, Amethi, Jalaun, Jhansi, Hamirpur, Banda, Fatehpur, Kaushambi, Barabanki, Faizabad, Kaiserganj, Gonda,
VI	25 May	Sultanpur, Pratapgarh, Phulpur, Allahabad, Ambedkar Nagar, Shravasti, Domariyaganj, Basti, Sant Kabir Nagar, Lalganj, Azamgarh, Jaunpur, Machhlishahr, Bhadohi
VII	1 June	Maharajganj, Gorakhpur, Kushinagar, Deoria, Bansgaon, Ghosi, Salempur, Ballia, Ghazipur, Chandauli, Varanasi, Mirzapur, Robertsganj

== Uttarakhand ==
The election schedule was announced by the Election Commission of India on 16 March 2024.

Poll event	Phase
Poll event	I
Notification date	20 March
Last date for filing nomination	27 March
Scrutiny of nomination	28 March
Last Date for withdrawal of nomination	30 March
Date of poll	19 April
Date of counting of votes/Result	4 June 2024
No. of constituencies	5

== West Bengal ==
Phase wise schedule of 2024 Indian general election in West Bengal

On 16 March 2024, the Election Commission of India announced the schedule of the 2024 Indian general election, with West Bengal scheduled to vote during all the 7 phases starting from 19 April and concluding on 1 June.

Poll event	Phase						
Poll event	I	II	III	IV	V	VI	VII
Notification date	20 March	28 March	12 April	18 April	26 April	29 April	7 May
Last date for filing nomination	27 March	4 April	19 April	25 April	3 May	6 May	14 May
Scrutiny of nomination	28 March	5 April	20 April	26 April	4 May	7 May	15 May
Last Date for withdrawal of nomination	30 March	8 April	22 April	29 April	6 May	9 May	17 May
Date of poll	19 April	26 April	7 May	13 May	20 May	25 May	1 June
Date of counting of votes/Result	4 June 2024						
No. of constituencies	3	3	4	8	7	8	9

=== Constituencies in phases ===
Phase	Poll date	Constituencies	Voter turnout (%)
I	19 April	Cooch Behar, Alipurduars, Jalpaiguri	81.91%
II	26 April	Darjeeling, Raiganj, Balurghat	76.58%
III	7 May	Maldaha Uttar, Maldaha Dakshin, Jangipur, Murshidabad	73.96%
IV	13 May	Baharampur, Krishnanagar, Ranaghat, Bardhaman Purba, Bardhaman–Durgapur, Asansol, Bolpur, Birbhum	
V	20 May	Bongaon, Barrackpore, Howrah, Uluberia, Serampore, Hooghly, Arambagh	
VI	25 May	Tamluk, Kanthi, Ghatal, Jhargram, Medinipur, Purulia, Bankura, Bishnupur	
VII	1 June	Dum Dum, Barasat, Basirhat, Jaynagar, Mathurapur, Diamond Harbour, Jadavpur, Kolkata Dakshin, Kolkata Uttar	
