= 2024 national electoral calendar =

National and federal elections held in 2024

- Countries with national elections or referendums: Executive Legislative Executive and Legislative Referendum Executive and Referendum Legislative and Referendum Executive, Legislative and Referendum

This national electoral calendar for 2024 lists the national/federal elections held in 2024 in all sovereign states and their dependent territories. By-elections are excluded, though national referendums are included.

== January ==
- 7 January: Bangladesh, Parliament
- 9 January: Bhutan, National Assembly (2nd round)
- 11 January: Sint Maarten, Parliament
- 13 January: Taiwan, President and Parliament
- 14 January: Comoros, President
- 21 January: Liechtenstein, Referendums
- 26 January: Tuvalu, Parliament
- 28 January: Finland, President (1st round)

== February ==
- 4 February: El Salvador, President and Parliament
- 7 February: Azerbaijan, President
- 8 February: Pakistan, National Assembly
- 11 February: Finland, President (2nd round)
- 14 February: Indonesia, President and Parliament
- 25 February:
  - Belarus, House of Representatives
  - Liechtenstein, Referendum

== March ==
- 1 March: Iran, Parliament (1st round) and Assembly of Experts
- 3 March:
  - El Salvador, Central American Parliament
  - Switzerland, Referendums
- 8 March: Ireland, Constitutional Referendums
- 10 March: Portugal, Parliament
- 15–17 March: Russia, President
- 23 March: Slovakia, President (1st round)
- 24 March: Senegal, President

== April ==
- 4 April: Kuwait, Parliament
- 6 April: Slovakia, President (2nd round)
- 10 April: South Korea, Parliament
- 17 April:
  - Croatia, Parliament
  - Solomon Islands, Parliament
- 19 April: India, House of the People (1st phase)
- 21 April:
  - Ecuador, Constitutional Referendum
  - Maldives, Parliament
- 24 April: North Macedonia, President (1st round)
- 26 April: India, House of the People (2nd phase)
- 29 April: Togo, Parliament

== May ==
- 5 May: Panama, President, Parliament, and Central American Parliament
- 6 May: Chad, President
- 7 May: India, House of the People (3rd phase)
- 8 May: North Macedonia, President (2nd round) and Parliament
- 10 May: Iran, Parliament (2nd round)
- 12 May: Lithuania, President (1st round) and Constitutional Referendum
- 13 May: India, House of the People (4th phase)
- 19 May: Dominican Republic, President, Senate, Chamber of Deputies, and Central American Parliament
- 20 May: India, House of the People (5th phase)
- 25 May: India, House of the People (6th phase)
- 26 May: Lithuania, President (2nd round)
- 29 May:
  - Madagascar, National Assembly
  - South Africa, National Assembly
  - Vanuatu, Constitutional Referendum

== June ==
- 1 June:
  - Iceland, President
  - India, House of the People (7th phase)
- 2 June: Mexico, President, Senate and Chamber of Deputies
- 6–9 June: European Union, European Parliament
- 9 June:
  - Belgium, Parliament
  - Bulgaria, Parliament
  - San Marino, Parliament
  - Slovenia, Referendum
  - South Ossetia, Parliament
  - Switzerland, Referendums
- 16 June: Liechtenstein, Referendum
- 28 June:
  - Iran, President (1st round)
  - Mongolia, Parliament
- 29 June: Mauritania, President
- 30 June: France, National Assembly (1st round)

== July ==
- 4 July: United Kingdom, House of Commons
- 5 July: Iran, President (2nd round)
- 7 July: France, National Assembly (2nd round)
- 15 July:
  - Rwanda, President and Chamber of Deputies
  - Syria, Parliament
- 28 July: Venezuela, President

== August ==
- 14 August: Kiribati, Parliament (1st round)
- 19 August:
  - Kiribati, Parliament (2nd round)
  - Sint Maarten, Parliament
- 31 August: Niue, Constitutional Referendum

== September ==
- 1 September: Azerbaijan, Parliament
- 7 September: Algeria, President
- 10 September: Jordan, House of Representatives
- 20–21 September: Czech Republic, Senate (1st round)
- 21 September: Sri Lanka, President
- 22 September:
  - Liechtenstein, Referendum
  - Switzerland, Referendums
- 27–28 September: Czech Republic, Senate (2nd round)
- 29 September: Austria, National Council

== October ==
- 6 October:
  - Kazakhstan, Referendum
  - Tunisia, President
- 9 October: Mozambique, President and Parliament
- 13 October: Lithuania, Parliament (1st round)
- 20 October: Moldova, President (1st round) and Constitutional Referendum
- 24 October: Montserrat, Parliament
- 25 October: Kiribati, President
- 26 October: Georgia, Parliament
- 27 October:
  - Bulgaria, Parliament
  - Japan, House of Representatives
  - Liechtenstein, Referendum
  - Lithuania, Parliament (2nd round)
  - Uruguay, President (1st round), Senate, Chamber of Representatives and Constitutional referendum
  - Uzbekistan, Legislative Chamber
- 30 October: Botswana, Parliament

== November ==
- 3 November: Moldova, President (2nd round)
- 5 November:
  - Palau, President, Senate and House of Delegates
  - Qatar, Constitutional Referendum
  - United States, President, Senate (Class 1) and House of Representatives
- 10 November: Mauritius, Parliament
- 13 November: Somaliland, President
- 14 November: Sri Lanka, Parliament
- 16 November: Gabon, Constitutional Referendum
- 17 November: Senegal, Parliament
- 24 November:
  - Romania, ~~President (1st round)~~ (election nullified)
  - Switzerland, Referendums
  - Uruguay, President (2nd round)
- 27–30 November: Namibia, President and National Assembly
- 29 November: Ireland, Dáil Éireann
- 30 November: Iceland, Parliament

== December ==
- 1 December:
  - Liechtenstein, Referendum
  - Romania, Senate and Chamber of Deputies
- 6 December: Aruba, Parliament
- 7 December: Ghana, President and Parliament
- 15 December: Bolivia, Judiciary
- 29 December:
  - Chad, Parliament
  - Croatia, President (1st round)

== Indirect elections ==
The following indirect elections of heads of state and the upper houses of bicameral legislatures took place through votes in elected lower houses, unicameral legislatures, or electoral colleges:

- Since 29 September 2022: Lebanon, President
- 2 January: Marshall Islands, President
- 19 January, 27 February, 25 June, and 3 September: India, Council of States
- 25 January: Nepal, National Assembly
- 25 February: Cambodia, Senate
- 26 February: Hungary, President
- 9 March: Pakistan, President
- 27 March: Malta, President
- 28–29 March: Tunisia, National Council of Regions and Districts
- 2 April: Pakistan, Senate
- 4 April: Belarus, Council of the Republic
- 29 April: Democratic Republic of the Congo, Senate
- 22 May: Vietnam, President
- 9 June: Belgium, Senate
- 9–26 June: Thailand, Senate
- 13–14 June: South Africa, National Council of Provinces
- 14 June: South Africa, President
- 7 October: Ethiopia, President
- 13 October: Macau, Chief Executive
- 21 October: Vietnam, President
- 31 October: Fiji, President
- 6 December: Mauritius, President
- 14 December: Georgia, President
