= Hemal Kheri =

- Village
- Location in Rajasthan, India Hemal Kheri (India)
- Coordinates: 24.576°N 75.938°E
- Country: India
- State: Rajasthan
- District: Kota
- Tehsil: Ramganj Mandi

Government
  - Type: Democratic
  - Panchayat: Dharnawad

Population (2011)
  - Total: 556
- Time zone: UTC+5:30 (IST)
- PIN: 326519
- Telephone code: 07459
- ISO 3166 code: RJ-IN
- Vehicle registration: RJ33

Hemal Kheri is a small village located in [8 km] Ramganj Mandi Tehsil of Kota, Rajasthan with a total of 117 families Living. The Hemal Kheri village has a population of 556 of which 295 are males and 261 are females as per Population census 2011.

In Hemal Kheri village population of children with age 0–6 is 63 which makes up 11.33% of the total population of the village. Average human sex ratio of Hemal Kheri village is 885 which is lower than the Rajasthan state average of 928. Child sex ratio for the Hemal Kheri as per census is 1250, higher than Rajasthan average of 888.

Hemal Kheri village has a higher literacy rate compared to Rajasthan. In 2011, the literacy rate of Hemal Kheri village was 70.18% compared to 66.11% of Rajasthan. In Hemal, Kheri Male literacy stands at 84.27% while the female literacy rate was 53.54%.

As per the constitution of India and Panchyati Raaj Act, Hemal Kheri village is administrated by Sarpanch (Head of Village) who is elected representative of the village.

== Demographics ==
The village is home to 556 people by providing details of census of INDIA, among them 295 (53%) are male and 261 (47%) are female. 1% of the whole population are from general caste, 29% are from scheduled caste and 70% are scheduled tribes. Child (aged under 6 years) population of Hemal Kheri village is 11%, among them 44% are boys and 56% are girls. There are 117 households in the village and an average of 5 persons live in every family.

== Languages ==
Rajasthani and Hindi

== Sports ==
The village is generally known for cricket, but the children also play a number of games like football, badminton, hockey, long jump etc. However, there is no such facility for the youth which is not great for the talented sportsmen.

== Transport ==
The motorcycle is the main vehicle of transportation however there are many cars and tractors. There are few public means of transport like Train: 3 km at Jhalawar Road and 8 km Ramganj Mandi Bus 8 km Ramganj Mandi, Flight 80 km Kota.

== Literacy ==
Total 346 people in the village are literate, among them 225 are male and 121 are female. Literacy rate (children under 6 are excluded) of Hemal Kheri is 70%. 84% of male and 54% of the female population are literate here. Overall literacy rate in the village has decreased by -6%. Male literacy has gone down by -8% and the female literacy rate has gone down by -4%.
