= Rajendra Singh Gudha =

Indian politician (born 1968)

State Minister Of Sainik Kalyan (IC), Home Guard & Civil Defence (IC), Panchayati Raj & Rural Development in Government of Rajasthan
- In office November 2021 – 21 July 2023
- Preceded by: Bhajan Lal Jatav
- Succeeded by: Otaram Dewasi

State Minister of Government of Rajasthan
- In office November 2011 – December 2013
- In office December 2009 – November 2011

Member of Rajasthan Legislative Assembly
- In office 2018–2023
- Preceded by: Shubhkaran Choudhary
- Succeeded by: Bhagawana Ram Saini
- In office 2008–2013
- Preceded by: New Constituency
- Succeeded by: Shubhkaran Choudhary
- Constituency: Udaipurwati

Personal details
- Born: 19 July 1968 (age 57) Gudha, Jhunjhunu
- Party: Shiv Sena (2023)
- Other political affiliations: Indian National Congress (2009-2023) (suspended)
- Parent: Madho singh Shekhawat (father)

Rajendra Singh Gudha is an Indian politician from Jhunjhunu, Rajasthan. He served as member of the Rajasthan Legislative Assembly from the Udaipurwati constituency. He is a member of the Shiv Sena. He formerly served as the State Minister of Sainik Kalyan (IC), Home Guard & Civil Defence (IC), Panchayati Raj & Rural Development in the Government of Rajasthan.
