= Kota Assembly constituency =

Kota Assembly constituency may refer to:

- Kota, Chhattisgarh Assembly constituency
- Kota South Assembly constituency in Rajasthan
- Kota North Assembly constituency in Rajasthan
