= Bhagirath Choudhary =

Indian politician

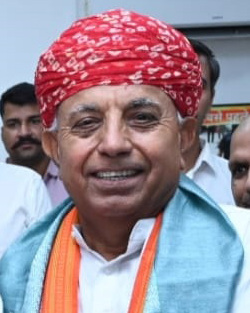

Minister of State in Ministry of Agriculture and Farmers Welfare
- Incumbent
- Assumed office 11 June 2024
- Prime Minister: Narendra Modi
- Minister: Shivraj Singh Chauhan
- Preceded by: Kailash Choudhary

Member of Parliament, Lok Sabha
- Incumbent
- Assumed office 23 May 2019
- Preceded by: Raghu Sharma
- Constituency: Ajmer (Lok Sabha constituency)

Member of Rajasthan Legislative Assembly
- In office 2013–2018
- Preceded by: Nathu Ram Sinodiya
- Succeeded by: Suresh Tak
- Constituency: Kishangarh Assembly constituency

Personal details
- Born: 16 June 1954 (age 72) Manpura, Ajmer State, India
- Party: Bharatiya Janata Party
- Occupation: Politician

Chaudhary Bhagirath Singh Choyal, or Bhagirath Chaudhary (Hindi pronunciation: [bʱaːgiːɾət̪ʰ t͡ʃɔːd̪ʱ.ɾiː]), is an Indian politician from Rajasthan. He is a member of Lok Sabha, the lower house of the parliament since 2019. He also served as member of the Rajasthan Legislative Assembly from Kishangarh Assembly constituency. He was Chairman of the Committee on Environment in 2015-16 and 2016-17. He is a Member of Bharatiya Janata Party. He is currently serving as Minister of State for Agriculture and Farmers' Welfare in Third Modi ministry.

== See also ==
- Third Modi ministry
