= Kishangarh Assembly constituency =

Legislative Assembly constituency in Rajasthan State, India

Coordinates: 26.59°N 74.85°E

Kishangarh
- Constituency No. 98 for the Rajasthan Legislative Assembly

Constituency details
- Country: India
- Region: North India
- State: Rajasthan
- District: Ajmer
- Lok Sabha constituency: Ajmer
- Established: 1972
- Total electors: 282,655
- Reservation: None

Member of Legislative Assembly
- 16th Rajasthan Legislative Assembly
- Incumbent Vikash Choudhary
- Party: Indian National Congress
- Elected year: 2023

Kishangarh Assembly constituency is one of the 200 Legislative Assembly constituencies of Rajasthan state in India.

It is part of Ajmer district. As of 2023, its representative is Vikash Choudhary of the Indian National Congress.

== Members of the Legislative Assembly ==
Year	Member	Party
1993	Jagdeep Dhankhar	Indian National Congress
1998	Nathu Ram Sinodiya	Indian National Congress
2003	Bhagirath Choudhary	Bharatiya Janata Party
2008	Nathu Ram Sinodiya	Indian National Congress
2013	Bhagirath Choudhary	Bharatiya Janata Party
2018	Suresh Tak	Independent
2023	Vikash Choudhary	Indian National Congress

== Election results ==
=== 2023 ===
2023 Rajasthan Legislative Assembly election: Kishangarh
Party	Candidate	Votes	%	±%
INC	Vikash Choudhary	83,645	38.59	+30.86
Independent	Suresh Tak	80,025	36.92	−5.24
BJP	Bhagirath Choudhary	37,534	17.32	−15.94
Independent	Satyanarayan Sen	2,737	1.26	
Independent	Babu Lal Bagariya	2,217	1.02	
NOTA	None of the above	3,467	1.6	+1.26
Majority		3,620	1.67	−7.23
Turnout		216,740	76.68	+2.17
INC gain from Independent		Swing		

=== 2018 ===
Rajasthan Legislative Assembly Election, 2018: Kishangarh
Party	Candidate	Votes	%	±%
Independent	Suresh Tak	82,678	42.16	
BJP	Vikash Choudhary	65,226	33.26	
Independent	Nathu Ram Sinodiya	22,851	11.65	
INC	Nanda Ram	15,157	7.73	
Independent	Matadeen	2,955	1.51	
NOTA	None of the above	674	0.34	
Majority		17,452	8.9	
Turnout		196,122	74.51	
Independent gain from BJP		Swing		

== See also ==
- List of constituencies of the Rajasthan Legislative Assembly
- Ajmer district
