= 2024 Indian general election in Puducherry =

Election to constitute the 18th Lok Sabha in 2024 for Puducherry

- 19 April 2024

1 Puducherry seat in the Lok Sabha
- Opinion polls
- Turnout: 78.80% (▼2.45%)
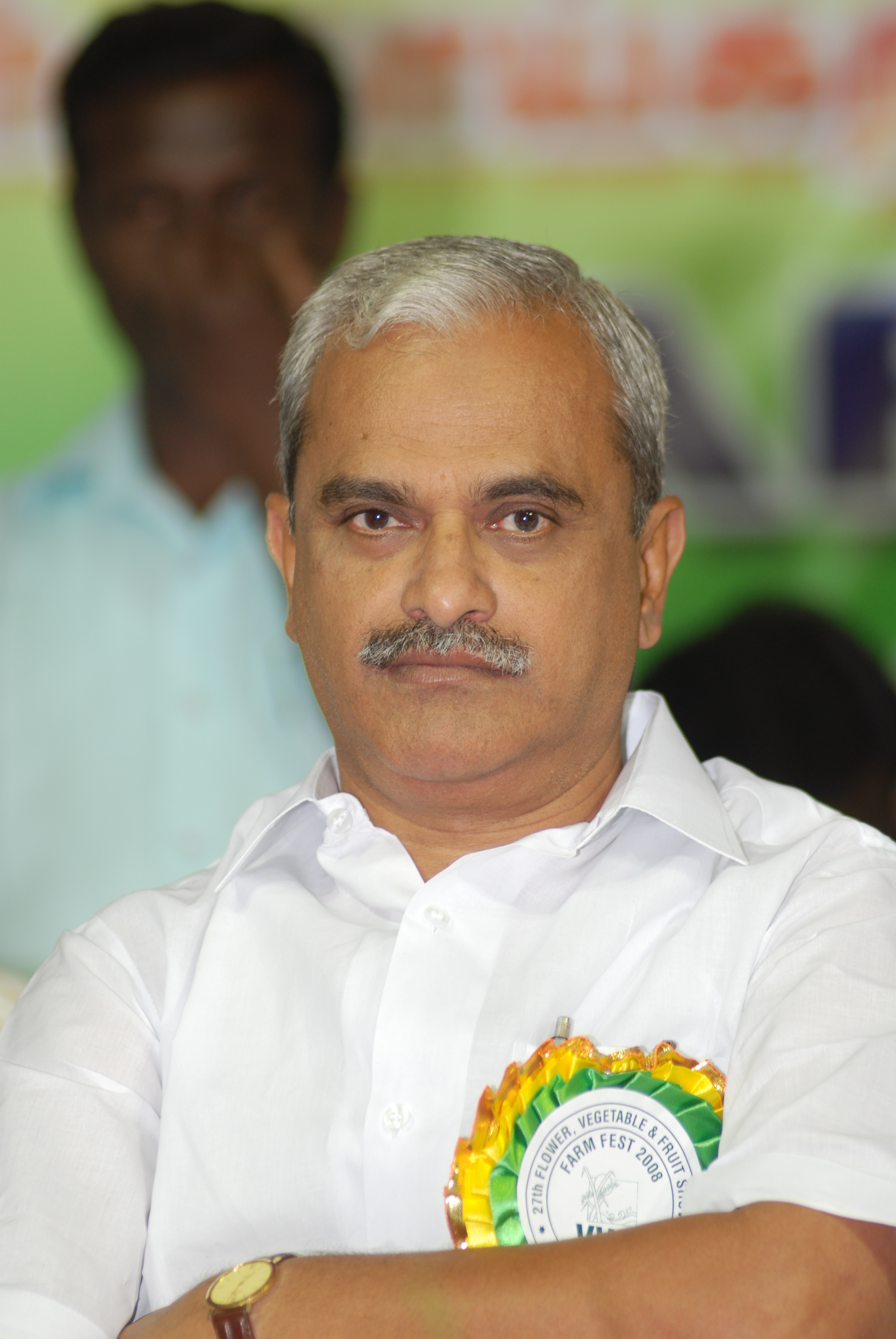

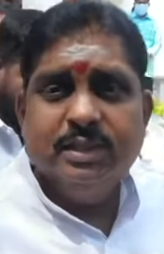
	First party	Second party
Leader	V. Vaithilingam	A. Namassivayam
Party	INC	BJP
Alliance	INDIA	NDA
Leader since	2023	2021
Last election	56.27%, 1 seat	31.36%, 0 seat (AINRC)
Seats won	1	0
Seat change	Steady	Steady
Popular vote	4,26,005	2,89,489
Percentage	52.73%	35.83%
Swing	▼2.54 pp	▲4.47 pp
Prime Minister before election
Narendra Modi
BJP
Prime Minister after election
Narendra Modi
BJP

The 2024 Indian general election was held in Puducherry on 19 April 2024 to elect 1 member of the 18th Lok Sabha.

== Election schedule ==
Poll event	Phase
Poll event	I
Notification date	20 March
Last date for filing nomination	27 March
Scrutiny of nomination	28 March
Last Date for withdrawal of nomination	30 March
Date of poll	19 April
Date of counting of votes/Result	4 June 2024
No. of constituencies	1

== Parties and alliances ==
=== Indian National Developmental Inclusive Alliance ===
Indian National Developmental Inclusive Alliance

Party	Flag	Symbol	Leader	Seats contested
Indian National Congress			V. Vaithilingam	1

=== National Democratic Alliance ===
National Democratic Alliance

Party	Symbol	Leader	Seats contested
Bharatiya Janata Party		A. Namassivayam	1

=== Others ===
Party	Flag	Symbol	Leader	Seats contested
All India Anna Dravida Munnetra Kazhagam			A. Anbalagan	1
Bahujan Samaj Party			D Alangaravelu	1
United Republican Party of India			K Prabhu Devan	1
Socialist Unity Centre of India (Communist)			P Sankaran	1

== Candidates ==
Constituency					
Constituency		INDIA		NDA	
1	Puducherry	INC	V. Vaithilingam	BJP	A. Namassivayam

== Surveys and polls ==
=== Opinion polls ===
Polling agency	Date published	Margin of error				Lead
Polling agency	Date published	Margin of error	NDA	INDIA	Others	Lead
ABP News-CVoter	March 2024	±5%	0	1	0	INDIA

=== Exit polls ===
Polling agency				Lead
Polling agency	NDA	INDIA	Others	Lead
Actual results	0	1	0	INDIA

== Results ==
=== Results by party ===
Alliance/ Party		Popular vote			Seat		
Alliance/ Party		Votes	%	±pp	Contested	Won	+/−
INDIA	INC	4,26,005	52.73%	▼2.54	1	1	Steady
NDA	BJP	2,89,489	35.83%	New	1	0	Steady
Others		69,363	8.57%	▼5.73	5	0	Steady
IND		13,320	1.64%	▼5.73	19	0	Steady
NOTA		9,763	1.20%	▼0.34			
Total		8,07,940	100%	-	26	1	-

=== Results by constituency ===
Constituency		Turnout	Winner					Runner-up					Margin
Constituency		Turnout	Party	Alliance	Candidate	Votes	%	Party	Alliance	Candidate	Votes	%	Margin
1	Puducherry	78.90%▼	INC	INDIA	V. Vaithilingam	4,26,005	52.73%	BJP	NDA	A. Namassivayam	2,89,489	35.83%	1,36,516

== Assembly segments wise lead of Parties ==
2024 Puducherry Lok Sabha Elections Assembly Wise Leads Map

Party	Assembly segments	Position in Assembly (as of 2026 election)
All India NR Congress	Not Contested	12
Bharatiya Janata Party	2	6
Indian National Congress	28	1
Dravida Munnetra Kazhagam	Not Contested	5
Others	0	6
Total	30	

== See also ==
- 2024 Indian general election in Chandigarh
- 2024 Indian general election in Rajasthan
- 2024 Indian general election in Sikkim
- Puducherry Legislative Assembly elections 2026
