= Shanti Kumar Dhariwal =

Indian politician

Shanti Dhariwal

State Minister Government of Rajasthan
- In office 17 December 2018 – December 2023
- Chief Minister: Ashok Gehlot
- Preceded by: Shrichand Kriplani
- Succeeded by: Jogaram Patel

Member of the Rajasthan Legislative Assembly
- Incumbent
- Assumed office December 2018
- Preceded by: Prahlad Gunjal
- In office December 2008 – December 2013
- Preceded by: Om Birla
- Succeeded by: Prahlad Gunjal
- In office December 1998 – December 2003
- Preceded by: Lalit Kishore Chaturvedi
- Succeeded by: Om Birla

Member of Parliament in 8th Lok Sabha Kota
- In office December 1984 – November 1989
- Preceded by: Krishana Kumar Goyal
- Succeeded by: Dau Dayal Joshi

Personal details
- Born: 29 October 1943 (age 82) Kota, Kota State, British India
- Party: Indian National Congress
- Spouse: Komal Dhariwal
- Education: B.A. & L.L.B. from University of Rajasthan
- Occupation: Politician

Shanti Kumar Dhariwal (born 29 October 1943) is an Indian politician and Former Cabinet minister in Ashok Gehlot ministry and also member of 11th, 13th and 15th and 16th Legislative Assembly of Rajasthan. He also served as Member of Parliament of Kota (1984–89). And currently he represents Kota North (Assembly constituency) as a member of Indian National Congress. In 2023, he defeated Prahlad Gunjal of BJP by 2486 votes to retain the Kota North seat.

== Early life and education ==
Dhariwal was born 29 October 1943 in the Kota district of Rajasthan to his father Rikhavchand Dhariwal. He married Komal Dhariwal. He completed his Bachelor of Arts in 1964 and Bachelor of Laws (LLB) in 1966 at the University of Rajasthan.

== Political career ==
Dhariwal was MLA for three strength term from Kota North and Member of Parliament for one term from Kota Lok Sabha as a member of Indian National Congress.

In 15th Legislative Assembly of Rajasthan (2018) elections, he defeated his nearest rival candidate Prahlad Gunjal (BJP) by a margin of 17,945 votes.

In December 2018, he was appointed Cabinet Minister in third Ashok Gehlot ministry with portfolios of Urban Development & Housing Department, Law & Legal Affairs and Legal Consultancy Office, Parliamentary Affairs Department.

In 2023, he retained the Kota North seat.

== Positions held ==
#	From	To	Position	Comments
1	2018	Incumbent	Cabinet Minister in Government of Rajasthan	
2	2018	Incumbent	MLA, 15th Legislative Assembly of Rajasthan	
3	2008	2013	MLA, 13th Legislative Assembly of Rajasthan	
4	1998	2003	MLA, 11th Legislative Assembly of Rajasthan	
5	1984	1989	Member of Parliament, Kota	
