= Udaipurwati Assembly constituency =

Constituency of the Rajasthan legislative assembly in India

Coordinates: 27.73°N 75.47°E

Udaipurwati
- Constituency No. 30 for the Rajasthan Legislative Assembly

Constituency details
- Country: India
- Region: North India
- State: Rajasthan
- District: Jhunjhunu
- Established: 2008
- Reservation: None

Member of Legislative Assembly
- 16th Rajasthan Legislative Assembly
- Incumbent Bhagawana Ram Saini
- Party: Indian National Congress

Udaipurwati Assembly constituency is one of the 200 constituencies of the Rajasthan Legislative Assembly. It covers all voters from Udaipurwati tehsil, in Jhunjhunu district and is a part of the Jhunjhunu Lok Sabha constituency.

== Members of the Legislative Assembly ==
Election	Name	Party
2008	Rajendra Singh Gudha	Bahujan Samaj Party
2013	Shubhkaran Choudhary	Bharatiya Janata Party
2018	Rajendra Singh Gudha	Bahujan Samaj Party
2023	Bhagawana Ram Saini	Indian National Congress

== Election results ==
=== 2023 ===
2023 Rajasthan Legislative Assembly election: Udaipurwati
Party	Candidate	Votes	%	±%
INC	Bhagwana Ram Saini	68,399	34.36	+4.08
BJP	Shubhkaran Choudhary	67,983	34.15	+3.18
SS	Rajendra Singh Gudha	57,823	29.05	
NOTA	None of the above	1,430	0.72	−0.23
Majority		416	0.21	−2.97
Turnout		199,059	76.57	+0.25
INC gain from BJP		Swing		

=== 2018 ===
2018 Rajasthan Legislative Assembly election: Udaipurwati
Party	Candidate	Votes	%	±%
BSP	Rajendra Singh Gudha	59,362	34.15	
BJP	Shubhkaran Choudhary	53,828	30.97	
INC	Bhagwanaram Saini	52,633	30.28	
CPI(M)	Moolchand	1,771	1.02	
Independent	Sandeep	1,694	0.97	
NOTA	None of the above	1,650	0.95	
Majority		5,534	3.18	
Turnout		173,826	76.32	
BSP gain from BJP		Swing		

== See also ==
- Jhunjhunu district
- List of constituencies of the Rajasthan Legislative Assembly
