= Kota Stone =

Type of limestone from Rajasthan, India

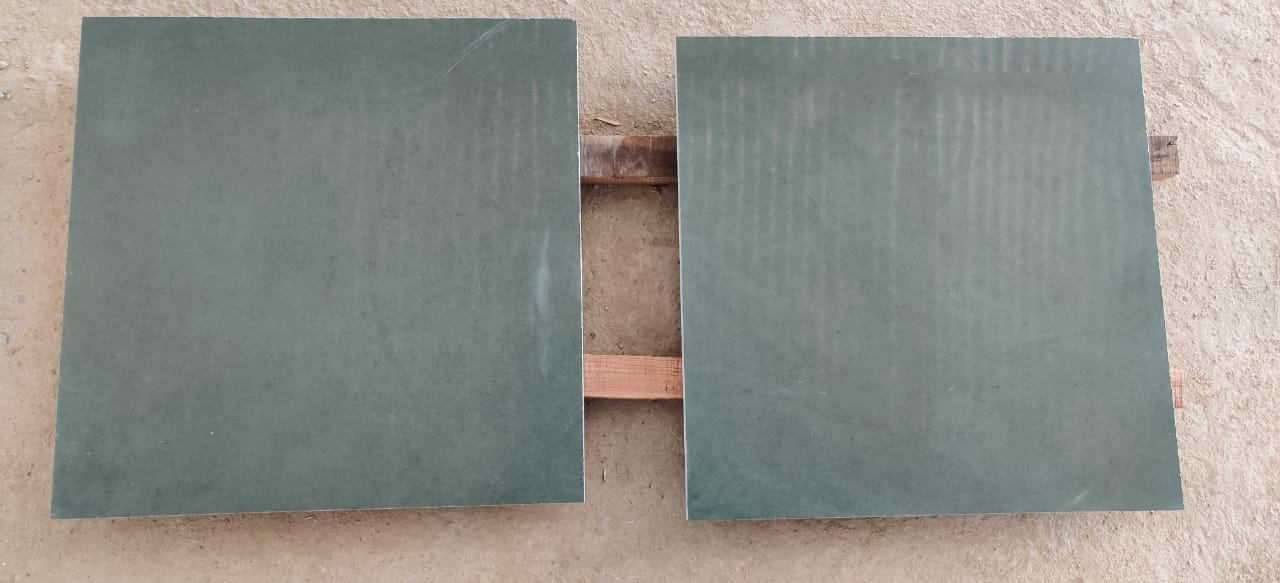
Building stone or Kota stone, (in tile shape)

Kota Stone is a fine-grained variety of Kota limestone, quarried at Kota district, Rajasthan, India. Hundreds of mines are located in or near the town of Ramganj Mandi and in the Kota district.

The greenish-blue and brown colours of this stone contribute to its popularity. Other colors are black, pink, grey, and beige. When used for building, the stone is mainly used for exteriors, but will also work when used for interiors.

== Limitations ==
Kota stone flakes, however, periodic polishing using polishing wax can eliminate this phenomenon. Since it is limestone, it is not resistant to acid or alkali. The stone is used throughout India, especially in government offices & institutions. It is a naturally available, fine-grained variety of limestone originating from Ramganj Mandi, Kota, Rajasthan.

== Usage ==
- Indoor Flooring
- Outdoor Flooring
- Garden Paving
- Wall Cladding
- Waterproofing
