= Bhagawana Ram Saini =

Indian politician

Member of 16th Rajasthan Assembly
- Incumbent
- Assumed office 15 December 2023
- Preceded by: Rajendra Singh Gudha
- Constituency: Udaipurwati

Personal details
- Party: Indian National Congress
- Education: University of Rajasthan
- Occupation: Politician

Bhagawana Ram Saini is an Indian politician from Rajasthan. He is member of Indian National Congress. He is serving as member of Rajasthan Legislative Assembly representing Udaipurwati Assembly constituency.

== Political life ==
In the 2023 Rajasthan Legislative Assembly election, Bhagwan Ram Saini of the Indian National Congress (INC) won by defeating Shubhkaran Chaudhary of the Bharatiya Janata Party (BJP) with a margin of 416 votes.
