= Ramganj Mandi =

- City
- Nicknames: Stone City, Coriander City
- Location in Rajasthan, India Ramganj Mandi (India)
- Coordinates: 24°38′50″N 75°56′40″E
- Country: India
- State: Rajasthan
- District: Kota
- Division: Kota Division
- Established: 1912
- Founder: Kota Darbaar

Government
  - Type: Democratic
  - Body: Municipality Board
  - Chairman: Shri Devilal Saini (Indian National Congress)
  - Vice Chairman: Shri Ramesh Meena (Indian National Congress)
  - Member of Parliament (Kota): Shree Om Birla (Bhartiya Janta Party)
  - Member of Legislative Assembly (Ramganj Mandi): Madan Dilawar (Bhartiya Janta Party)
- Elevation: 360 m (1,180 ft)

Population (2011)
  - Total: 41,328
- Time zone: UTC+5:30 (IST)
- PIN: 326519
- Telephone code: 07459
- ISO 3166 code: RJ-IN
- Vehicle registration: RJ33

Ramganj Mandi is a city and a municipality in Kota district in the Indian state of Rajasthan. It has the largest grain market of coriander with around 6500 tons of coriander seeds arriving on a single day during season. A new spice park is being constructed on Nimana road, the link road between SH 9B and NH 12. Annually billions of square feet of limestone is exported throughout the country, mainly in Punjab, Haryana, Chandigarh, Gujarat, Maharashtra and Madhya Pradesh. Around 1000 stone processing units are set up in the industrial area. More than 80 mines are present in the area.

== Demographics ==
As of 2001 India census, Ramganj Mandi had a population of 41,784. Males constitute 53% of the population and females 47%. Ramganj Mandi has an average literacy rate of 68%, higher than the national average of 59.5%: male literacy is 75%, and female literacy is 60%. In Ramganj Mandi, 16% of the population is under 10 years of age.

169 villages come under sub district Ramganj Mandi. The total population of Ramganj Mandi subdistrict is 272,448, of which 142,353 are males and 130,095 are females. Ramganjmandi is a major market for agriculture for Rajasthan and surrounding area of Madhya Pradesh. Its revenue for the state Rajasthan is more than 18 district of Rajasthan.

== History ==
The city was formerly an outskirt of Khairabad village. People started living around the railway station which was then known as Khairabad road, Suket road.

Later on, the Princely State of Kota established this area as Ramganj Mandi. Mostly people came here to work and later settled here. Most of the economy is based on stone business and coriander seeds.

== Transport ==
Rail - The city is situated on Delhi-Bombay Railway line, so it is well connected to all major cities via Rail. City has a railway station Ramganj mandi Junction (starting point of under construction of ramganj Mandi-Bhopal railway line and provide connectivity to Jhalawar district on this route).

Road - City has two bus stands; one near Martyr Pannalal Circle which is only for Rajasthan Roadways Buses, and another near railway station for private bus operators.

Rajasthan State Highway 9B is passing through city to Jhalawar connecting city with National Highway 12. Another State Highway 9A is touching the city which is further going to "Anu Nagari" Rawatbhata via Chechat.

There are many roadway transport services which transport "Kota Stone" and coriander to all parts of India.

Air - Nearest airport is Kota 75 kilometres (47 mi) 280 kilometres (170 mi).
