= Ramswaroop Koli =

Indian politician

Ramswaroop Sundarlal Koli

Member of Parliament, Lok Sabha
- In office 2004–2009
- President: A. P. J. Abdul Kalam
- Prime Minister: Manmohan Singh
- Preceded by: Bahadur Singh Koli
- Constituency: Bayana - Bharatpur

Personal details
- Born: 15 January 1965 (age 61) Bhusawar, Bharatpur district, Rajasthan, India
- Party: Bharatiya Janata Party
- Spouse: Asha Kumari
- Children: 4 sons and 2 daughters
- Occupation: Agriculturist
- Profession: Politician
- As of 14 September, 2006

Ramswaroop Sundarlal Koli (born 15 January 1965) is an Indian politician, Social worker and former MP of the 14th Lok Sabha of India. He represents the Bayana constituency of Rajasthan and is a member of the Bharatiya Janata Party (BJP) political party.

== Positions held ==
- 2004 - Member of Parliament, Lok Sabha
- 2004 - Member of Committee on Human Resource Development
- 5 August 2006 - Member of Committee on Human Resource Development
- 5 August 2007 to Present - Member of Committee on Human Resource Development
