= Prahlad Gunjal =

Indian politician

Member of Rajasthan Legislative Assembly
- In office 2013–2018
- Preceded by: Shanti Dhariwal
- Succeeded by: Shanti Dhariwal
- Constituency: Kota North
- In office 2003–2008
- Preceded by: Ram Kishan Verma
- Succeeded by: Chandrakanta Meghwal
- Constituency: Ramganj Mandi

Personal details
- Born: 29 June 1967 (age 59) Dharmpura, Rajasthan, India
- Party: Indian National Congress (since 2024)
- Other political affiliations: Bharatiya Janata Party (before 2024 and member for nearly 40 years)
- Spouse: Smt. Jai Kanwar
- Children: 3
- Parent: Shri Bhairulal
- Education: Swaytshasi University, Maharshidyand University
- Profession: Politician

Prahlad Gunjal is an Indian politician from Rajasthan and former two time Member of the Rajasthan Legislative Assembly for Kota North,https://theprint.in/india/rajasthan-bjp-leader-prahlad-gunjal-joins-congress/2010226/ elected in 2013. He is member of the Indian National Congress.
