= Ramganj Mandi Assembly constituency =

Legislative Assembly constituency in Rajasthan State, India

Coordinates: 24.65°N 75.95°E

Ramganj Mandi
- Constituency No. 192 for the Rajasthan Legislative Assembly

Constituency details
- Country: India
- Region: North India
- State: Rajasthan
- District: Kota
- Lok Sabha constituency: Kota
- Established: 1972
- Total electors: 248,061
- Reservation: SC

Member of Legislative Assembly
- 16th Rajasthan Legislative Assembly
- Incumbent Madan Dilawar
- Party: Bharatiya Janata Party

Ramganj Mandi Assembly constituency is one of the 200 Legislative Assembly constituencies of Rajasthan state in India.

It is part of Kota district and is reserved for candidates belonging to the Scheduled Castes.

== Members of the Legislative Assembly ==
Year	Member	Party
1998	Ram Kishan Verma	Indian National Congress
2003	Prahlad Gunjal	Bharatiya Janata Party
2008	Chandrakanta Meghwal	Bharatiya Janata Party
2013	Chandrakanta Meghwal	Bharatiya Janata Party
2018	Madan Dilawar	Bharatiya Janata Party
2023	Madan Dilawar	Bharatiya Janata Party

== Election results ==
=== 2023 ===
2023 Rajasthan Legislative Assembly election: Ramganj Mandi
Party	Candidate	Votes	%	±%
BJP	Madan Dilawar	103,504	52.99	+1.54
INC	Mahendra Rajoriya	85,082	43.56	−0.59
BSP	Bharat Kumar Marmath	2,387	1.22	−0.21
NOTA	None of the above	2,019	1.03	−0.21
Majority		18,422	9.43	+2.13
Turnout		195,331	78.74	+0.32
BJP hold		Swing		

=== 2018 ===
Rajasthan Legislative Assembly Election, 2018: Ramganj Mandi
Party	Candidate	Votes	%	±%
BJP	Madan dilawar	90,817	51.45	
INC	Ramgopal	77,938	44.15	
BSP	Kailash Chand	2,521	1.43	
AAP	Nirmal Mehra	2,115	1.2	
NOTA	None of the above	2,196	1.24	
Majority		12,879	7.3	
Turnout		176,523	78.42	

== See also ==
- List of constituencies of the Rajasthan Legislative Assembly
- Kota district
