= Suresh Tak =

Member of 15th Rajasthan Legislative Assembly

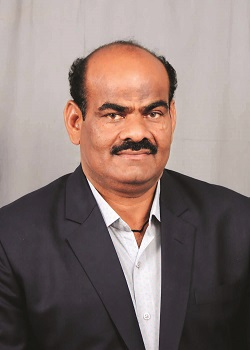

Member of the Rajasthan Legislative Assembly
- In office 2018–2023
- Succeeded by: Vikash Choudhary
- Constituency: Kishangarh

Personal details
- Born: 1 June 1962 (age 63) Kishangarh, Ajmer
- Party: Independent
- Occupation: Politician

Suresh Tak (born June 1, 1962) is a businessman and was a member of the 15th Rajasthan Legislative Assembly representing the constituency of Kishangarh. He won representation to the state's assembly in the elections held in 2018 as an independent candidate.
