= Kota North Assembly constituency =

Assembly constituency in Rajasthan

Coordinates: 25.22°N 75.87°E

Kota North
- Constituency No. 189 for the Rajasthan Legislative Assembly

Constituency details
- Country: India
- Region: North India
- State: Rajasthan
- District: Kota
- Established: 1957
- Reservation: None

Member of Legislative Assembly
- 16th Rajasthan Legislative Assembly
- Incumbent Shanti Dhariwal
- Party: Indian National Congress
- Elected year: 2023

Kota North Assembly constituency is a constituency of the Rajasthan Legislative Assembly covering the Kota Municipal Corporation in the Kota district of Rajasthan, India.

Kota North is one of eight assembly constituencies in the Kota (Lok Sabha constituency). Since 2008, this assembly constituency is numbered 189 amongst 200 constituencies.

Currently this seat is represented by Indian National Congress candidate Shanti Dhariwal who won in last Assembly election of 2023 Rajasthan Legislative Assembly election by defeating Bharatiya Janta Party candidate Prahlad Gunjal by a margin of 2,486 votes.

== Geographical scope ==
The constituency comprises parts of Tehsil Ladpura (Partly), Kota Municipal Corporation (Partly)- Ward no. 1, 2, 12 to 32 and 49 to 52.

== Member of the Legislative Assembly ==
Year	Name	Party
1957	Rameshwar Dayal	Indian National Congress
1962	Krishan Kumar	Bharatiya Jana Sangh
1967	Krishan Kumar	Bharatiya Jana Sangh
1972	Bhuwnesh Chaturvedi	Indian National Congress
1977	Lalit Kishore Chaturvedi	Janata Party
1980	Lalit Kishore Chaturvedi	Bharatiya Janta Party
1985	Lalit Kishore Chaturvedi	Bharatiya Janta Party
1990	Lalit Kishore Chaturvedi	Bharatiya Janta Party
1993	Lalit Kishore Chaturvedi	Bharatiya Janta Party
1998	Shanti Dhariwal	Indian National Congress
2003	Om Birla	Bharatiya Janata Party
2008	Shanti Dhariwal	Indian National Congress
2013	Prahlad Gunjal	Bharatiya Janata Party
2018	Shanti Dhariwal	Indian National Congress
2023	Shanti Dhariwal	Indian National Congress

== Election results ==
=== 2023 ===
2023 Rajasthan Legislative Assembly election: Kota North
Party	Candidate	Votes	%	±%
INC	Shanti Kumar Dhariwal	94,899	49.5	▼3.86
BJP	Prahlad Gunjal	92,413	48.21	▲4.96
RRP	Tarun	432	0.22	0.0
NOTA	None of the above	1,594	0.83	▼0.5
Majority		2,486	1.29	▼8.82
Turnout		191,704	74.96	▲0.57
INC hold		Swing	▼8.86	

=== 2018 ===
2018 Rajasthan Legislative Assembly election: Kota North
Party	Candidate	Votes	%	±%
INC	Shanti Kumar Dhariwal	94,728	53.36	
BJP	Prahlad Gunjal	76,783	43.25	
NOTA	None of the above	2,363	1.33	
Majority		17,945	10.11	
Turnout		177,541	74.39	
INC gain from BJP		Swing	▲10.15	

=== 2013 ===
2013 Rajasthan Legislative Assembly election: Kota North
Party	Candidate	Votes	%	±%
BJP	Prahlad Gunjal	79,295	48.21%	+10.40%
INC	Shanti Kumar Dhariwal	64,434	39.18%	−16.38%
SDPI	Mohammad Shafi	13,545	8.34%	N/A
NOTA	None of the Above	2,002	1.22%	+1.22%
BSP	Nathu Lal Sharma	1,115	0.68%	−1.01%
Jago Party	Komal Swaroop Bhatnagar	1,041	0.63%	N/A
NPP	Atul Srivastava	967	0.59%	N/A
RJVP	Mohammad Salim	328	0.20%	N/A
Majority		14,861	9.03%	−8.03%
Turnout		1,64,473	76.00%	+15.60%
BJP gain from INC		Swing	▲9.03	

=== 2008 ===
2008 Rajasthan Legislative Assembly election: Kota North
Party	Candidate	Votes	%	±%
INC	Shanti Kumar Dhariwal	68,560	55.56	
BJP	Suman Shringi	46,829	37.81	
BSP	Mohammad Irshad	2,099	1.69	
SP	Ashfaq Hussain	912	0.74	
IJP	Abdul Wahid	511	0.41	
Majority		21,371	17.75	
Turnout		123,855	60.40	
INC win (new seat)				

=== 2003 ===
2003 Rajasthan Legislative Assembly election: Kota
Party	Candidate	Votes	%	±%
BJP	Om Birla	87,197	51.85	
INC	Shanti Kumar Dhariwal	77,096	45.84	
Independent	Tribuhuneshwar Sharma	1,608	0.96	
Rashtriya Samanta Party	Atul Shrivastava	1,053	0.63	
Shiv Sena	Vijay Kumar Chaturvedi	832	0.49	
Majority		10,101	6.01	
Turnout		168,180	65.67	
BJP hold		Swing		
