= Shubhkaran Choudhary =

Indian politician (born 1958)

Member of the Rajasthan Legislative Assembly
- In office 2013–2018
- Preceded by: Rajendra Singh gudha
- Succeeded by: Rajendra Singh gudha
- Constituency: Udaipurwati
- Prime Minister: Narendra Modi

Personal details
- Born: 2 March 1958 (age 68) Tonk Chhilari, Rajasthan, India
- Party: Bharatiya Janata Party
- Education: Board of Secondary Education Rajasthan Ajmer
- Occupation: Politician
- Profession: Social worker

Shubhkaran Choudhary is an Indian politician from the Bharatiya Janata Party and a former member of the Rajasthan Legislative Assembly representing the Udaipurwati Assembly constituency of Rajasthan. He is a development oriented MLA.
