= Udai Bhan Singh =

Maharaj-Rana of Dholpur from 1911 to 1954

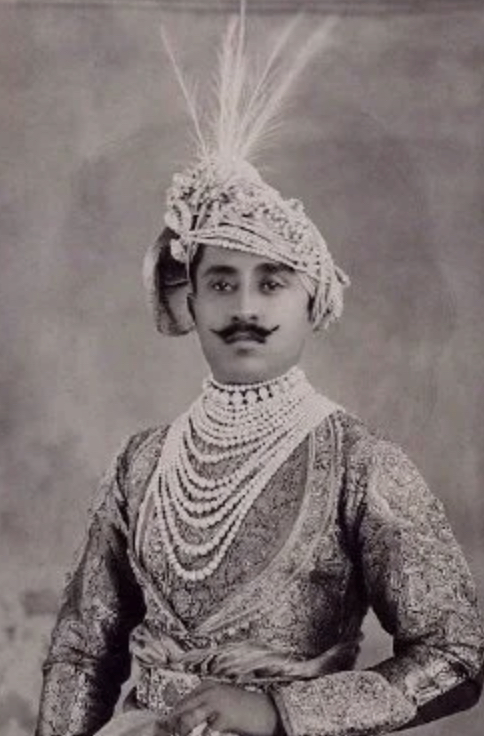

Maharaj-Rana of Dholpur
- Reign: 29 March 1911 – 22 October 1954
- Coronation: 29 March 1911
- Investiture: 9 October 1913
- Predecessor: Ram Singh
- Successor: Hemant Singh
- Born: February 12, 1893; Dholpur
- Died: October 22, 1954 (aged 61); Dholpur
- Spouse: Malvender Kaur
- Issue: Urmila Devi
Names
- Rais-ud-Daula Sipahdar-ul-Mulk Saramad-i-Rajah-i-Hind Maharajadhiraj Sri Sawai Maharaj-Rana Sir Udai Bhan Singh Lokendra Bahadur Diler Jang Jai Deo
- House: Bamraulia Dynasty
- Father: Nihal Singh
- Mother: Harbans Kaur
- Religion: Hinduism
- Education: Mayo College; Imperial Cadet Corps

Rajpramukh of United States of Matsya
- In office 18 March 1948 – 15 May 1949
- Chief Minister: Shobha Ram Kumawat
- Preceded by: Office created
- Succeeded by: Position abolished

Sir Udai Bhan Singh GCIE KCSI KCVO (Hindi: उदयभान सिंह; 12 February 1893 – 22 October 1954) was the Maharaj-Rana of Dholpur princely state, located in present-day Dholpur district of Rajasthan, from 1911 until his death in 1954.

== Early life and education ==
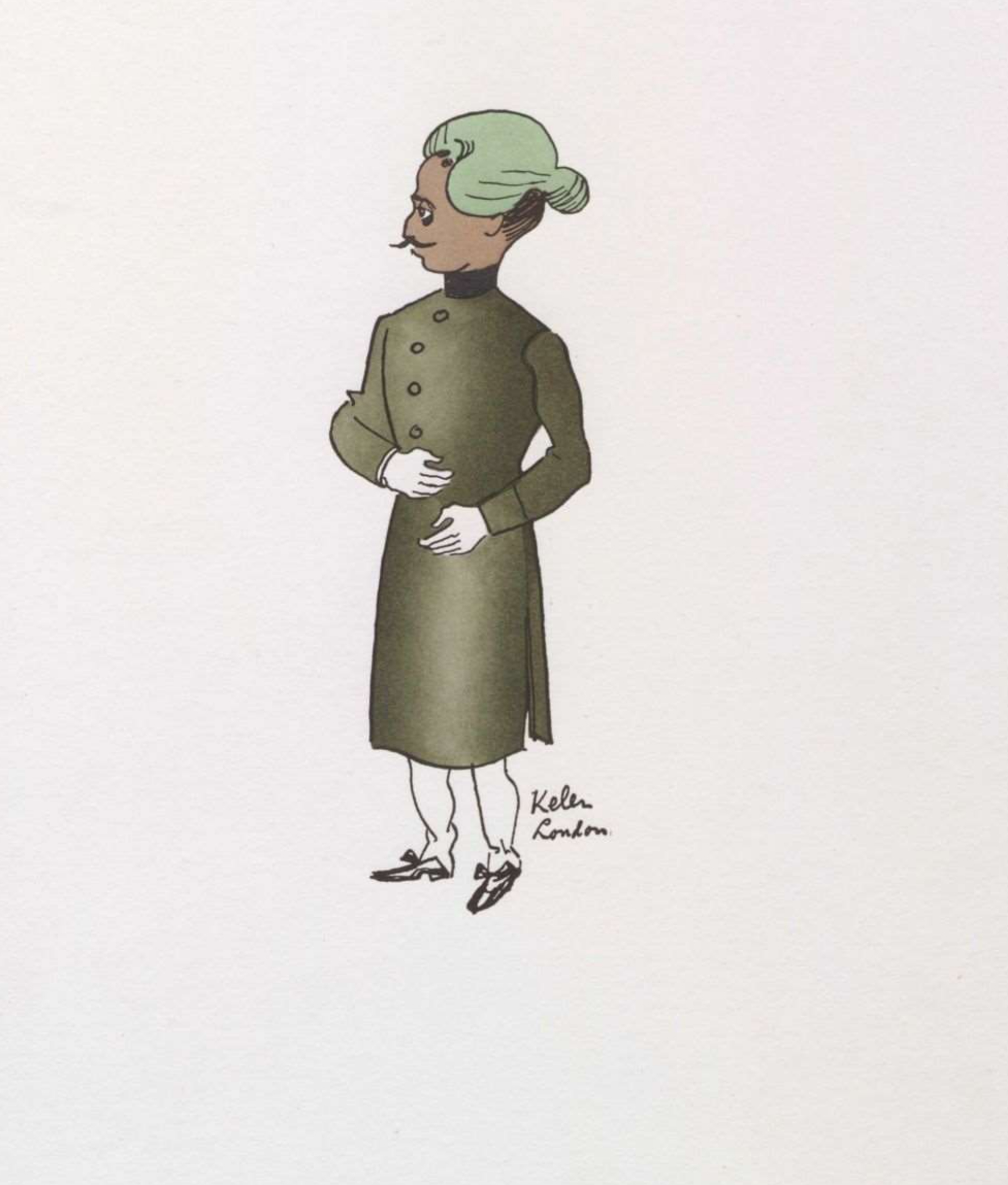
Caricature of Udai Bhan Singh by Emery Kelen

Udai Bhan Singh was born on 12 February 1893 in Bamraulia Jat dynasty. He received his education at Mayo College, Ajmer, where he successfully passed the Diploma examination and earned numerous prizes. He secured a prize for an essay on irrigation and a certificate from the Ambulance Society for First Aid to the Wounded. He took a short course of training at the Imperial Cadet Corps in Dehradun.

== Reign ==
He succeeded his elder brother, Ram Singh, as the Maharaj-Rana of Dholpur, following his death on 29 March 1911. The administration of the state was entrusted to G.H. Anderson, who acted as the Superintendent of the State and Guardian to the Maharaj-Rana. He was assisted by selected officials under the general direction of the Political Agent. From 1911 to 1913, Anderson presided over State Council meetings and directed the administration. He paid a short visit to Europe, from where he returned in September 1912. He was invested with full ruling powers on the 9 October 1913.

His state, Dholpur, enjoyed a permanent salute of 15 guns. However, on 1 January 1921, he was granted a salute of 17 guns as a personal distinction. He was a delegate to the Second Round Table Conference in London in 1931 and stayed at the May Fair Hotel. Singh challenged his cousin, Maharaja Bhupinder Singh of Patiala, in the elections for the Chancellor of the Chamber of Princes; however, despite having the support of the British Raj's political departments, including that of the British Residents in the Indian States, he lost to Bhupinder Singh.

On 14 August 1947, he signed the Instrument of Accession and Standstill Agreement, through which he acceded his state to India. Louis Mountbatten, in his capacity as Governor-General of India, accordingly accepted it on 16 August 1947.

== Freemason ==
Singh was a Freemason and was installed in 1916 as Master of Holland Lodge No. 3554, Bharatpur, Mumbai, which had been consecrated on 6 January 1912 and was closed in 1927.

== Rajpramukh of Matsya Union ==
When the United States of Matsya (Matsya Union) was formed on 18 March 1948 following the merger of Alwar, Bharatpur, Dholpur, and Karauli, he was appointed as its Rajpramukh, a position he held from 18 March 1948 until 15 May 1949 when it was merged with Greater Rajasthan to form the United State of Rajasthan.

== Mayo College, Ajmer ==
In 1928, Udai Bhan was a member of the General Council of Mayo College, Ajmer. During the years 1931-1932 and 1942–43, he held the office of President of the General Council of the college. In 1940–41, he served as vice-president.

== Chamber of Princes ==
He served as the Pro-Chancellor of the Chamber of Princes.

== Hunting ==
On 20 November 1919, during a hunting event where 4,206 birds were killed by 50 guns, 401 of these fell to his gun. On 8 December 1921, during Edward VIII's tour of India, a duck shoot was organized at a reserve in Bharatpur. During this event, the Maharaj-Rana managed to shoot down 210 ducks, the highest individual bag.

According to Conrad Corfield, he was the finest game shot in India. However, he developed such a profound love for wildlife that he renounced the use of firearms altogether. He had the area around Kaiserbagh Palace in Dholpur made into a sanctuary and implemented numerous improvements in the existing Ram Sagar and Satakarai Sanctuaries. These improvements included constructing walls, establishing good roads, and blocking nullahs, among other enhancements.

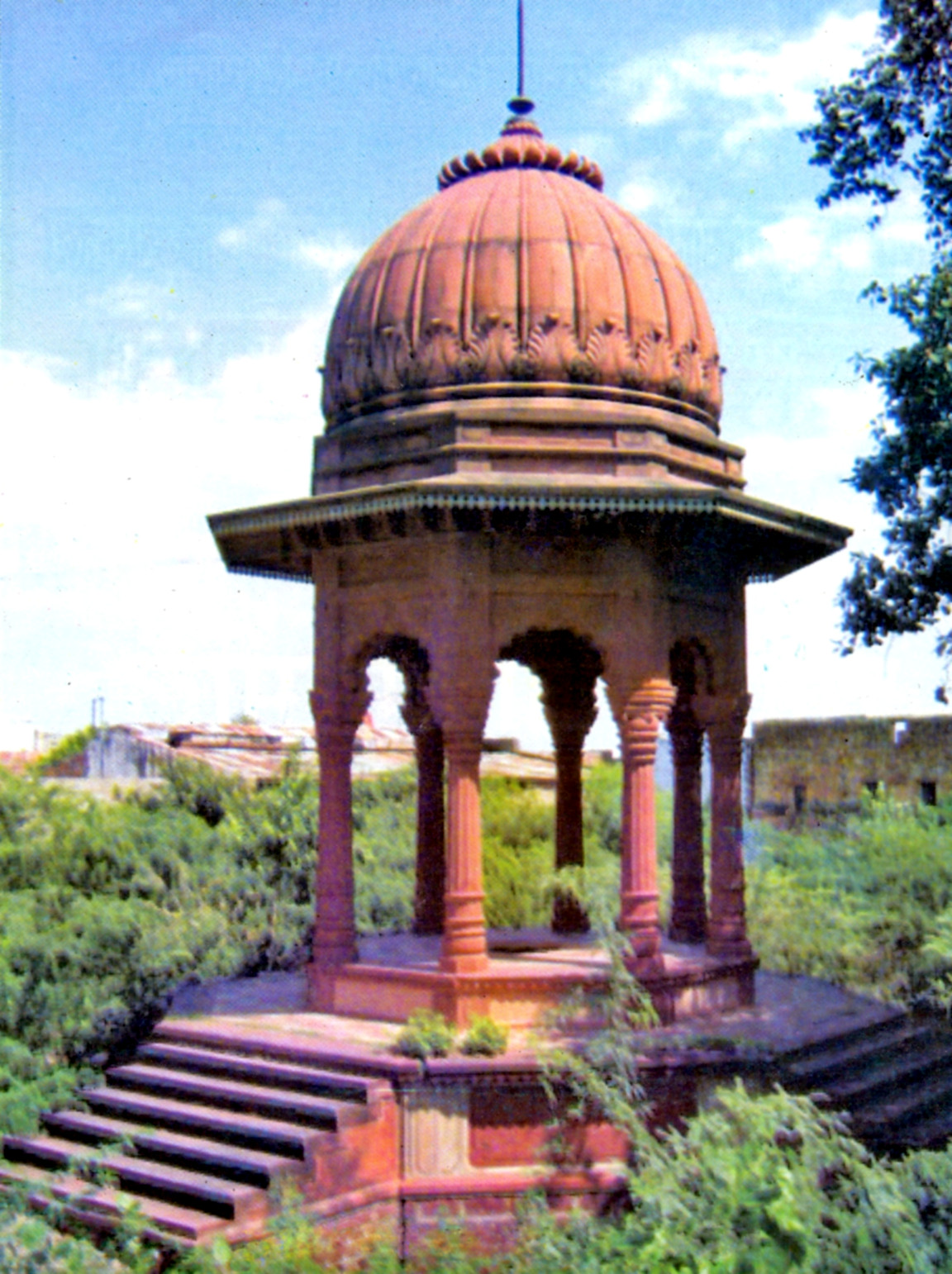
Chhatri of Maharaj-Rana Udai Bhan Singh at Dholpur

== Military ranks ==
He was appointed as a Major in the Army on 1 January 1921. Later, on 24 October 1921, he was promoted to the rank of Lieutenant-Colonel.

== Family ==
In June 1911, he married Malvender Kaur, the daughter of Sardar Shamsher Singh of Badrukhan in Jind State. He had a daughter named Urmila Devi, who, in 1943, married Pratap Singh, the Maharaja of Nabha State.

As he had no male heir, following his demise, his widow adopted their daughter's son, Hemant Singh, who succeeded him.

== Dholpur House ==
The Dholpur House was constructed in 1920 by Maharaj-Rana Udai bhan Singh. It was built for his transit residence whenever he was at Delhi. Dholpur House is located on Shahjahan Road, near India Gate. It was built in the Art Deco style.

Today, the building serves as the headquarters of the Union Public Service Commission. The UPSC conducts interviews at Dholpur House to recruit candidates for the All India Services and Group A services for the Government of India.

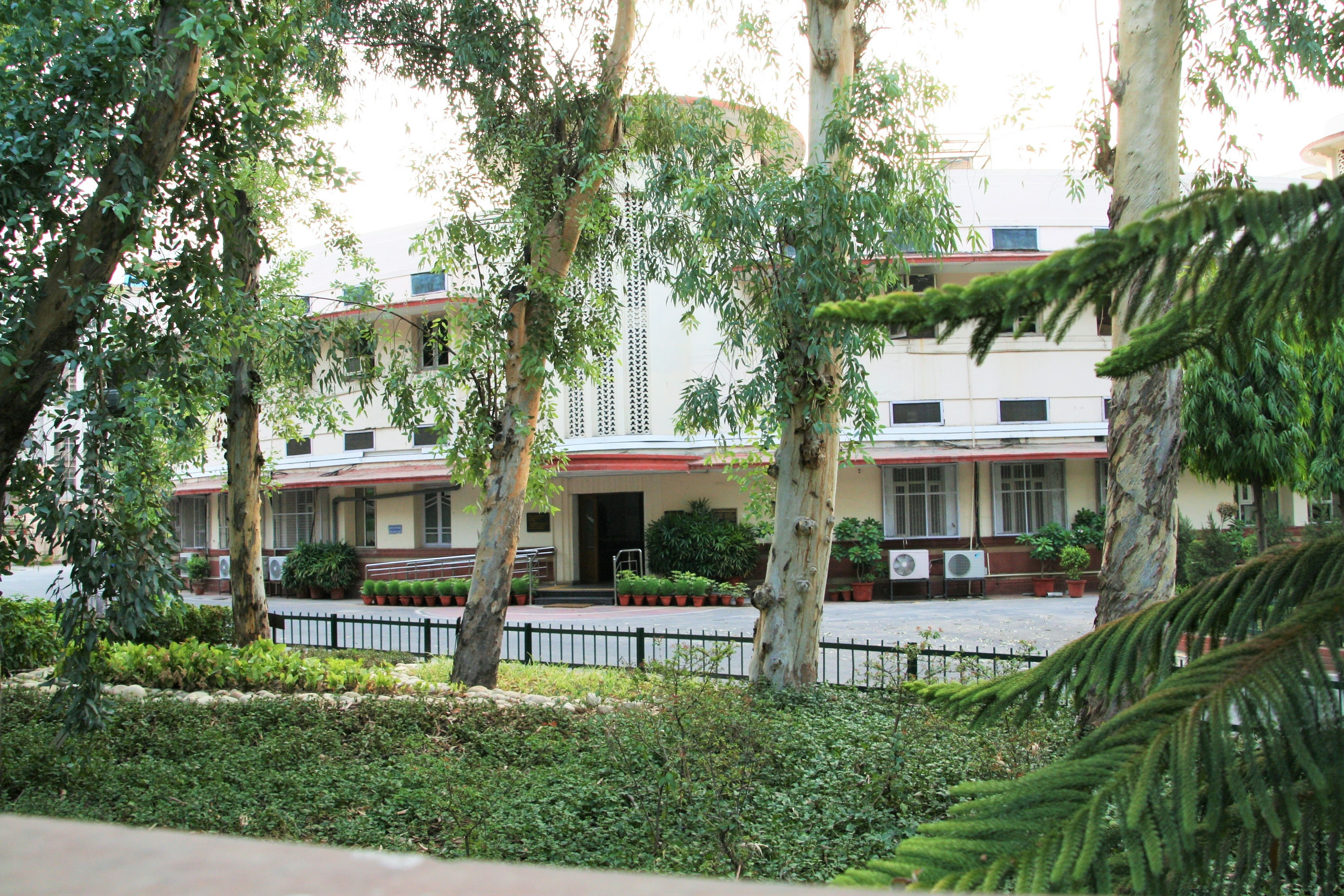
Dholpur House

== Death ==
He died on 22 October 1954 and was succeeded by his adopted grandson Hemant Singh.

== Titles, styles, and honours ==
=== Titles and styles ===
Colonel His Highness Rais-ud-Daula Sipahdar-ul-Mulk Saramad-i-Rajah-i-Hind Maharajadhiraj Sri Sawai Maharaj-Rana Sir Udai Bhan Singh Lokendra Bahadur Diler Jang Jai Deo, Maharaj-Rana of Dholpur, GCIE, KCSI, KCVO.

=== Honours ===
- British Raj:
  - 1911: Delhi Durbar Gold Medal
- United Kingdom:
  - 1 January 1918: Knight Commander of the Order of the Star of India
  - 17 March 1922: Knight Commander of the Royal Victorian Order
  - 1931: Knight Grand Commander of the Order of the Indian Empire
  - 1935: King George V Silver Jubilee Medal
  - 1937: King George VI Coronation Medal
- India:
  - 1947: Indian Independence Medal

Udai Bhan Singh Bamraulia Dynasty Born: 12 February 1893 Died: 22 October 1954
Preceded by Ram Singh	Maharaj-Rana of Dholpur; 1911-1954	Succeeded by Hemant Singh
