= Dushyant Singh =

Indian politician and businessman

Member of Parliament, Lok Sabha
- Incumbent
- Assumed office 18 May 2009
- Preceded by: constituency established
- Constituency: Jhalawar-Baran, Rajasthan
- In office 17 May 2004 – 18 May 2009
- Preceded by: Vasundhara Raje
- Succeeded by: constituency abolished
- Constituency: Jhalawar, Rajasthan

Personal details
- Born: 11 September 1973 (age 52) Mumbai, Maharashtra, India
- Party: Bharatiya Janata Party
- Spouse: Niharika Raje (m.2000)
- Children: 2 (1 son and 1 daughter)
- Parents: Hemant Singh (father); Vasundhara Raje Scindia (mother)
- Education: The Doon School
- Alma mater: St. Stephen's College, Delhi (BA); Johnson & Wales University (MBA)
- Website: dushyantsingh.in

Dushyant Singh (born 11 September 1973; Hindi pronunciation: [d̪ʊʃ.jən̪t̪ sɪŋgʱ]) is an Indian politician who hails from the former royal family of the erstwhile princely state of Dholpur, located in present-day Dholpur district of Rajasthan. Singh is the present titular Maharajasaheb. He is serving as a Member of Parliament in the Lok Sabha for the fifth time. The son of Vasundhara Raje Scindia, who served twice as the Chief Minister of Rajasthan, Singh was first elected from the Jhalawar constituency and has since been re-elected from the Jhalawar–Baran constituency.

== Education ==
Singh was educated at The Doon School in Dehradun. He received a Bachelor of Arts in economics from the St. Stephen's College, Delhi and a Master of Business Administration, focusing on hotel management, from Johnson & Wales University in the United States.

== Political career ==
Singh entered politics in 2004 after being persuaded by his mother, Vasundhara Raje Scindia, and joined the Bharatiya Janata Party (BJP). He won his first election and was elected as a Member of Parliament in 2004 from the Jhalawar constituency in Rajasthan.

In 2009, Mr. Singh won his second Lok Sabha election from the Jhalawar–Baran constituency, despite an Indian National Congress electoral wave in Rajasthan. In 2014, Mr. Singh won a Lok Sabha seat for a third time in a landslide victory. His third Lok Sabha victory made Mr. Singh one of BJP's senior-most parliamentarians. In 2019, Mr. Singh won his Lok Sabha seat for the fourth time in a row. In 2024, Mr. Singh won his fifth consecutive Lok Sabha election.

== Personal life and family ==
Mr. Singh is married to Niharika Raje and they have two children; one son and one daughter. Singh's mother, Vasundhara Raje Scindia, twice served as the Chief Minister of Rajasthan and also served as a Minister in the Union Cabinet of Prime Minister Atal Bihari Vajpayee. Mr. Singh is the maternal grandson of Maharaja Jivaji Rao Scindia and Vijayaraje Scindia of Gwalior, and the paternal grandson of Pratap Singh Nabha, the last Maharaja of Nabha.

Mr. Singh's wife, Niharika Raje, is the daughter of Ranjeet Singh Judeo, a politician and a member of the former royal family of Samthar State, and Ganga Rajya Laxmi, a member of the former Rana dynasty of Nepal.
