= Hemant Singh =

Last titular Maharaj Rana of Dholpur from 1954–1971

- Maharaj-Rana

Maharaj-Rana of Dholpur
- Reign: 1954–1971
- Coronation: 1954
- Predecessor: Udaybhanu Singh
- Successor: Dushyant Singh (Titular)
- Born: 5 January 1951
- Spouse: Vasundhara Raje (m. 1972; div. 1973); Bhawani Devi (m. 1972)
- Issue: Dushyant Singh; Rudrani Singh
- House: Bamraulia Dynasty
- Father: Pratap Singh (biological); Udai Bhan Singh (adoptive)
- Mother: Urmila Devi (biological)
- Religion: Hinduism

Maharaj Rana Hemant Singh (born 5 January 1951) was the Maharaj-Rana of Dholpur princely state, located in present-day Dholpur district, from 1954 to 1971, when all royal titles and privy purses were abolished through the 26th Amendment to the Constitution of India.

== Life ==
Hemant Singh was born the second son of Maharaja Pratap Singh Nabha, the last Maharaja of Nabha and his wife Urmila Devi, the last Maharani of Nabha (1924–1997). When Singh was three years old, his maternal grandfather, Maharaj-Rana Udai Bhan Singh of Dholpur, died and Singh was adopted by his maternal grandmother as Uday Bhan's heir. Hemant Singh received his primary and senior Secondary education from the Doon School and at completed his Bachelor's of Arts Degree from the Hindu College, Delhi University, in 1971. He was the last titular Maharaj-Rana of Dholpur from 1954 to 1971, when all royal titles and privy purses were abolished by the Republic of India through the 26th Amendment to the Constitution.

== Personal ==
On 17 November 1972, Hemant Singh married firstly – Vasundhara Raje (8 March 1953-), the third daughter of the Maharaja of Gwalior, Jivajirao Scindia and Vijaya Raje Scindia. The couple separated the following year, having had one son- Dushyant Singh who is currently a member of parliament. In 1973, Hemant Singh settled permanently at Panchsheel Marg in Delhi.

== Titles ==
- 1951-1954: Maharajkumar Shri Hemant Singh
- 1954–1971: His Highness Maharajadhiraja Shri Sawai Maharaj Rana Shri Hemant Singh, Lokendra Bahadur, Diler Jang Jai Deo, Maharaj Rana of Dholpur

Hemant Singh Bamraulia Dynasty Born: 5 January 1951
Titles in pretence
| Preceded by Udai Bhan Singh | — TITULAR — Maharaj-Rana of Dholpur; 1954–71; Reason for succession failure: Royal titles & privy purse abolished by Government of India | Succeeded by None |
