= Matsya States Union =

- State of India
- 1948–1949
- Capital: Alwar
- History
  - Merger of former princely states, Alwar, Bharatpur, Dholpur, and Karauli after accession: 18 March 1948
  - Merger into Greater Rajasthan: 15 May 1949
Preceded by
Alwar State
Bharatpur State
Dholpur State
Karauli State
Succeeded by
State of Rajasthan
- Today part of: India · Rajasthan

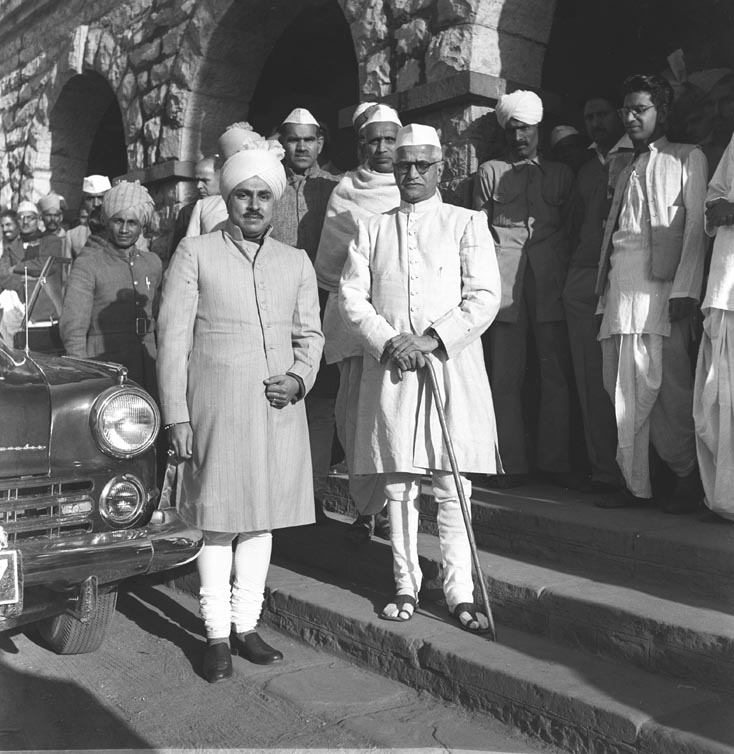
N.V. Gadgil at Bharatpur Railway Station for the inauguration of the Matsya States Union (March 1948)

The Matsya States Union, also called Matysa Union and Matsya Sangh, was a State of India which was formed on 18 March 1948 by the merger of four erstwhile princely states, Alwar, Bharatpur, Dholpur, and Karauli, after their accession to the Dominion of India. Shobha Ram Kumawat of Indian National Congress was the first and last chief minister of the State from 18 March 1948 till 15 May 1949. Maharaja of Dholpur, Udai Bhan Singh, became its Rajpramukh, and Maharaja of Karauli state, Ganesh Pal, was made its deputy-Rajpramukh.

On 15 May 1949, the Matsya Union was merged with Greater Rajasthan, to form the United States of Rajasthan, under the promise of autonomy, which later became the state of Rajasthan on 26 January 1950.
