= Vasundhara Raje =

11th Chief Minister of Rajasthan

Vasundhara Raje Scindia
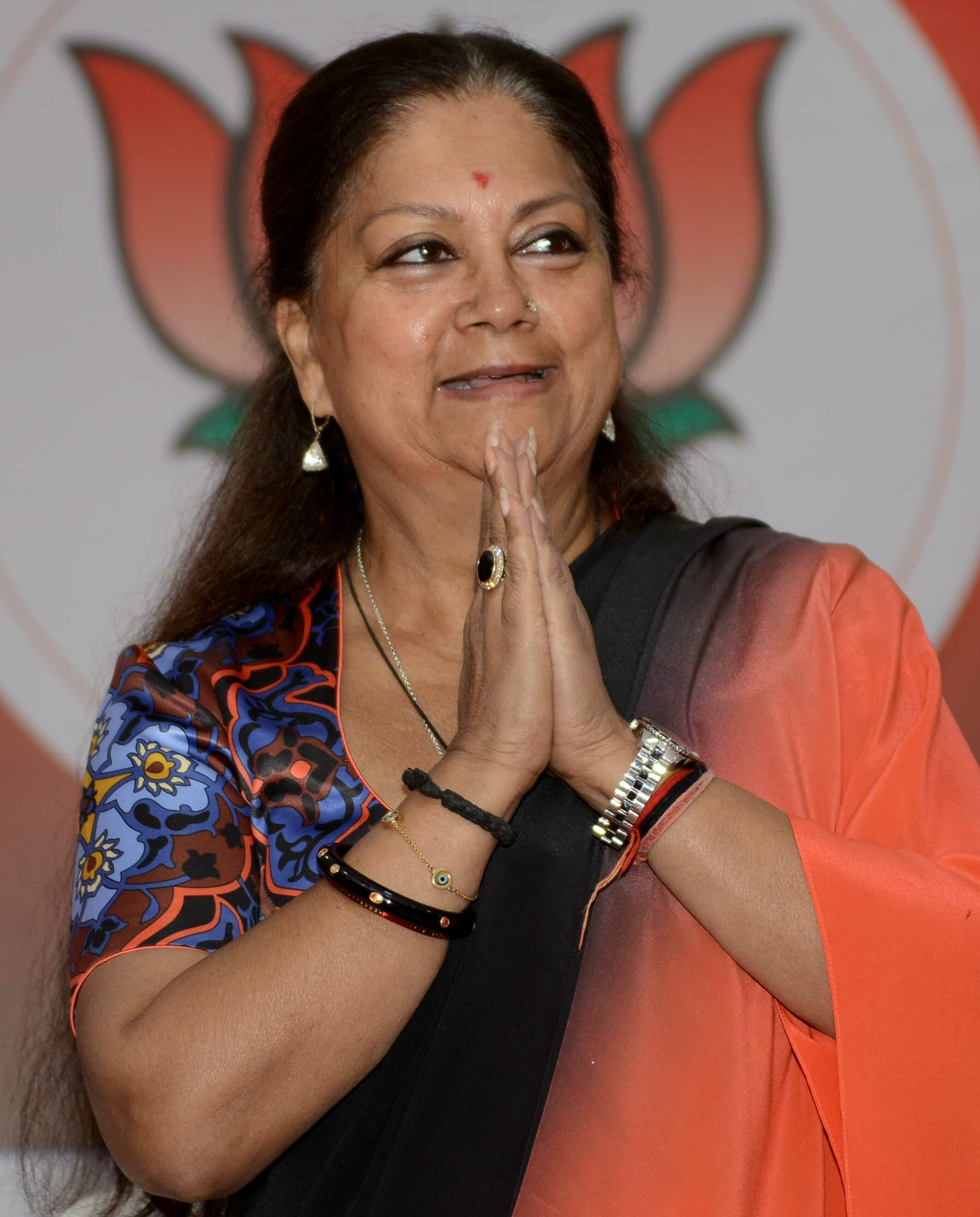

13th Chief Minister of Rajasthan
- In office 12 December 2013 – 17 December 2018
- Governor: Margaret Alva; Ram Naik; Kalyan Singh
- Preceded by: Ashok Gehlot
- Succeeded by: Ashok Gehlot
- In office 8 December 2003 – 11 December 2008
- Governor: Kailashpati Mishra; Madhan Lal Khurana; T. V. Rajeswar; Pratibha Patil; Akhlaqur Rahman Kidwai; Shilendra Kumar Singh
- Preceded by: Ashok Gehlot
- Succeeded by: Ashok Gehlot

Minister of State for of Personnel, Public Grievances and Pensions, Government of India
- In office 9 April 1999 – 30 January 2003
- Minister: Atal Bihari Vajpayee

Member of Rajasthan Legislative Assembly
- Incumbent
- Assumed office 8 December 2003
- Preceded by: Mohan Lal
- Constituency: Jhalrapatan
- In office 1985 – 1990
- Preceded by: Banwari Lal Sharma
- Succeeded by: Bhairon Singh Shekhawat
- Constituency: Dholpur

Member of Parliament, Lok Sabha
- In office 2 December 1989 – 8 December 2003
- Preceded by: Jhujhar Singh
- Succeeded by: Dushyant Singh
- Constituency: Jhalawar, Rajasthan

Minister of Micro, Small and Medium Enterprises (Ios)
- In office 13 October 1999 – 29 January 2003
- Prime Minister: Atal Bihari Vajpayee

Leader of the Opposition, Rajasthan Legislative Assembly
- In office 2 January 2009 – 20 February 2013
- Preceded by: Hemaram Choudhary
- Succeeded by: Gulab Chand Kataria

Personal details
- Born: 8 March 1953 (age 73) Bombay, Bombay State, India (present day Mumbai, Maharashtra)
- Party: Bharatiya Janata Party
- Spouse: Hemant Singh (m. 1972; div. 1973)
- Children: Kunwar Dushyant Singh (son)
- Parent(s): Jiwajirao Scindia (father); Vijaya Raje Scindia (mother)
- Relatives: Madhavrao Scindia (brother); Yashodhara Raje Scindia (sister); Jyotiraditya Scindia (nephew)
- Education: University of Mumbai
- Website: vasundhararaje.in

Vasundhara Raje Scindia (born 8 March 1953) is an Indian politician, who has held the position of the chief minister of Rajasthan from 2003 to 2008 and 2013 to 2018. She was previously a minister in the Union Cabinet of Atal Bihari Vajpayee and for India's Minister of state External Affairs (India) and Minister of state Personnel, Public Grievances and Pensions. She is only woman to serve as the Chief Minister for the state of Rajasthan. A member of the Scindia dynasty, she is also the matriarch of the Bamraulia family of Dholpur.

== Early life ==
Vasundhara Raje Scindia was born on 8 March 1953 in Bombay (now Mumbai). She is the daughter of Vijayaraje Scindia, Maharani and later Rajmata of Gwalior and Jiwajirao Scindia, Maharaja of Gwalior, members of the prominent Scindia Dynasty.

Raje completed her school education at Presentation Convent School in Kodaikanal, Tamil Nadu, and later graduated with economics and political science degrees from the Sophia College for Women, Mumbai.

== Personal life ==
She married Maharaj Rana Hemant Singh, of the royal family of Dholpur on 17 November 1972, but they separated a year later. Her son, Kunwar Dushyant Singh, was elected to the Lok Sabha from her former constituency, Jhalawar. Her siblings are Yashodhara Raje Scindia, a former industries minister of Madhya Pradesh, the late Madhavrao Scindia, the late Padmavati Raje "Akkasaheb" Burman (1942–64), who married Kirit Deb Burman, the last ruling Maharaja of Tripura, and Usha Raje Rana (b. 1943) who married into the Rana family of Nepal.

== Children ==
She has one son Dushyant Singh, who is a four-time member of Parliament through Loksabha and the Yuvraj of Dholpur.

== Political career ==
In 1984, Raje entered the Indian political system. Initially, she was made a member of the national executive of the newly formed Bharatiya Janata Party. She was also elected as a member of the 8th Rajasthan Assembly from Dholpur. In the same year, she was appointed vice president of the Yuva Morcha, Rajasthan BJP. In 2023, Chief Minister Ashok Gehlot said Raje had helped save his government in 2020 by opposing the BJP’s attempts to bribe MLAs. Hours later, she dismissed the chief minister’s statement as a lie and conspiracy against her. In 2023, she lost her chief minister post from newly elected- MLA Bhajan Lal Sharma, which prevented from her becoming chief minister for third time.

=== Positions held ===
- 1985-87: vice-president, Yuva Morcha BJP, Rajasthan
- 1987: vice-president, BJP, Rajasthan
- 1990-91: member, Library Committee, member, Consultative Committee, Ministries of Commerce and Tourism
- 1991-96: member, Consultative Committees, Ministries of Power, Science and Technology, Environment and Tourism
- 1996-97: member, Committee on Science and Technology, Environment and Forests, Member, Consultative Committees, Ministries of Power, Science and Technology and Tourism
- 1997-1998: joint secretary, BJP Parliamentary Party
- 1998-99: Union minister of state, External Affairs
- 13 October 1999 – 31 August 2001: Union minister of state (Independent Charge), Small Scale Industries and Agro & Rural Industries; Department of Personnel and Training; Department of Pensions and Pensioners' Welfare in the Ministry of Personnel, Public Grievances and Pensions; Department of Atomic Energy and Department of Space
- 1 September 2001 – 1 November 2001: Union minister of state, Small Scale Industries; Personnel, Training, Pensions, Administrative Reforms & Public Grievances; Department of Atomic Energy; and Department of Space (Independent charge)
- 2 November 2001- 8 December 2003: Union minister of state, Small Scale Industries; Personnel, Training, Pensions, Administrative Reforms & Public Grievances; Planning; Department of Atomic Energy; and Department of Space (Independent Charge)
- 14 Nov 2002-14 Dec 2003 : president, BJP, Rajasthan
- 8 December 2003 – 8 December 2008: chief minister, Rajasthan
- 2 January 2009 – 8 December 2013: leader of opposition, Rajasthan legislative assembly
- 8 December 2013 – 11 December 2018: chief minister, Rajasthan
- 11 January 2019: national vice president of Bharatiya Janata Party

== Electoral Performance ==
=== Member of parliament ===
- 1989-91: member, 9th Lok Sabha, from Jhalawar.
- 1991-96: member, 10th Lok Sabha
- 1996-98: member, 11th Lok Sabha
- 1998-99: member, 12th Lok Sabha
- 1999-2003: member, 13th Lok Sabha

Lok Sabha
Year	Constituency	Party	Votes	%	Opponent	Party	Opponent votes	%	Margin	Margin in %	Result
1984	Bhind	BJP	106,757	26.25	Rao Krishnapal (Maharaj Krishna Singh Judeo Datia)	INC	1,94160	47.73	87,403		Lost
1989	Jhalawar	BJP	304,728	60.96	Shiv Narain	INC	1,58,187	31.64	1,46,541	29.32%	Won
1991	Jhalawar	BJP	245,956	58.72	Man singh	INC	1,54,796	36.96	91,160	21.76%	Won
1996	Jhalawar	BJP	234,360	49.89	Man singh	INC	1,85,476	39.48	48,884	10.41%	Won
1998	Jhalawar	BJP	333,746	52.77	Bharat Singh	INC	2,70,179	42.72	63,567	10.05%	Won
1999	Jhalawar	BJP	409,574	60.43	Dr. Abrar Ahmed	INC	257,159	37.94	152,415	22.49%	Won

=== Member of legislative assembly ===
- 1985-90 member, 8th Rajasthan legislative assembly from Dholpur.
- 2003-08 member, 12th Rajasthan legislative assembly from Jhalrapatan
- 2008–13, 13th Rajasthan legislative assembly from Jhalrapatan
- 2013–18, member, 14th Rajasthan legislative assembly from Jhalrapatan
- 2018–23, member, 15th Rajasthan legislative assembly from Jhalrapatan
- 2023-28, member,16th Rajasthan legislative assembly from Jhalrapatan.

Rajasthan Legislative Assembly
Year	Constiuency	Party	Votes	%	Opponent	Party	Opponent Votes	%	Margin	Margin in %	Result
1985	Dholpur	BJP	49,174	62.51	Banwari Lal	INC	26,494	33.68	22,680	28.83%	Won
2003	Jhalrapatan	BJP	72,760	59.20	Rama Pilot	INC	45,385	36.92	27,375	22.28%	Won
2008	Jhalrapatan	BJP	81,593	56.59	Mohan Lal	INC	49,012	33.99	32,581	22.59%	Won
2013	Jhalrapatan	BJP	114,384	63.14	Meenakshi Chandrawat	INC	53,488	29.53	60,896	33.61%	Won
2018	Jhalrapatan	BJP	116,484	54.14	Manvendra Singh Jasol	INC	81,504	37.88	34,980	16.26%	Won
2023	Jhalrapatan	BJP	138,831	59.51	Ramlal Chouhan	INC	85,638	36.71	53,193	22.8%	Won

== Works ==
- Vasundhara Raje, Rajasthan Gaurav Yatra
- Vasundhara Raje, Bhamashah Yojana
- Satyam Kumar and Vasundhara Raje, iStart Rajasthan
- Vasundhara Raje, Jal Swavlamban
- See More Schemes of Vasundhara Raje

== Achievements ==
In 2007, she received the "Women Together Award" from the UNO for services rendered towards the self-empowerment of women.

In 2018, she received the 'Best Chief Minister of the Year' Award at the 52nd Skoch Summit.

== Book ==
A book on the life of Vasundhara Raje named Vasundhara Raje aur Vikasit Rajasthan was written by the historian Vijay Nahar and published by Prabhat Prakashan.

== See also ==
- Politics of Rajasthan
- Rajasthan Legislative Assembly
- 16th Rajasthan Assembly
- Bhajan Lal Sharma ministry
- List of chief ministers of Rajasthan
- List of governors of Rajasthan
- List of speakers of the Rajasthan Legislative Assembly

Lok Sabha
Preceded by Jujhar Singh	Member of Parliament for Jhalawar; 1989 – 2003	Succeeded by Dushyant Singh
Political offices
Preceded by Ashok Gehlot	Chief Minister of Rajasthan; 8 December 2003 – 11 December 2008	Succeeded by Ashok Gehlot
Preceded by Ashok Gehlot	Chief Minister of Rajasthan; 13 December 2013 – 16 December 2018	Succeeded by Ashok Gehlot
