= Jhalrapatan Assembly constituency =

Legislative Assembly constituency in Rajasthan State, India

Coordinates: 24.54°N 76.17°E

Jhalrapatan
- Constituency No. 198 for the Rajasthan Legislative Assembly

Constituency details
- Country: India
- Region: North India
- State: Rajasthan
- District: Jhalawar
- Lok Sabha constituency: Jhalawar–Baran
- Established: 1977
- Total electors: 297,916
- Reservation: None

Member of Legislative Assembly
- 16th Rajasthan Legislative Assembly
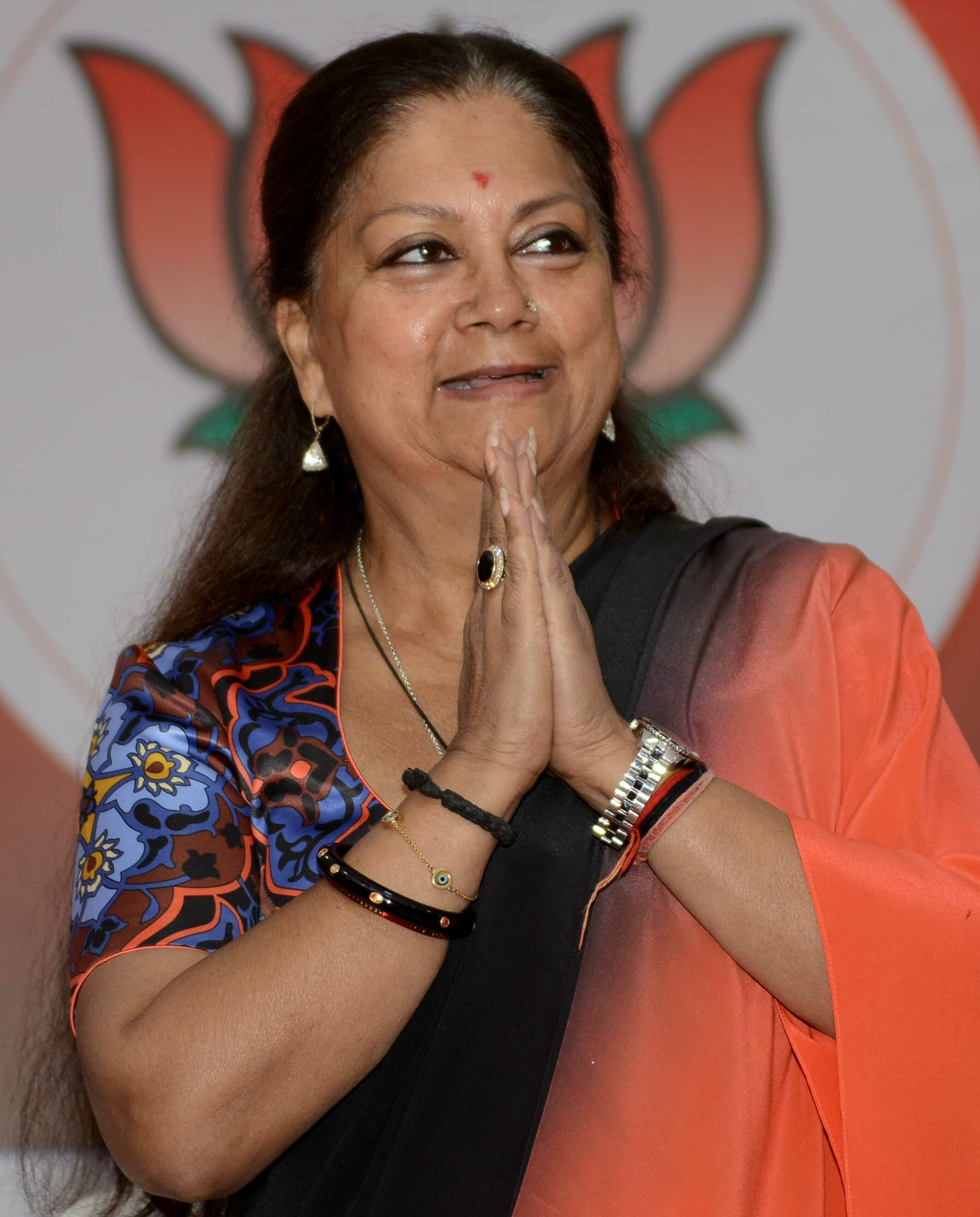
- Incumbent Vasundhara Raje
- Party: Bharatiya Janata Party
- Elected year: 2018
- Preceded by: Mohanlal

Jhalrapatan Assembly constituency is one of the 200 Legislative Assembly constituencies of Rajasthan state in India. It is in Jhalawar district and is a segment of Jhalawar–Baran Lok Sabha constituency.

Jhalrapatan has returned the State's former Chief Minister, Vasundhara Raje, as MLA (Member of the State's Legislative Assembly) on behalf of the Bharatiya Janata Party four times.

== Members of the Legislative Assembly ==
Year	Member	Party
1952	Madho Lal	Indian National Congress
1952	Bhagwan Singh	Indian National Congress
1957	Jayendra Singh	Indian National Congress
1962	Harish Chandra	Indian National Congress
1967	Ram Prasad Bohra	Independent politician
1972	Ram Prasad Bohra	Indian National Congress
1977	Nirmal Kumar	Janata Party
1980	Anang Kumar	Bharatiya Janata Party
1985	Jwala Prasad	Indian National Congress
1990	Anang Kumar	Bharatiya Janata Party
1993	Anang Kumar	Bharatiya Janata Party
1998	Mohan Lal	Indian National Congress
2003	Vasundhara Raje	Bharatiya Janata Party
2008	Vasundhara Raje	Bharatiya Janata Party
2013	Vasundhara Raje	Bharatiya Janata Party
2018	Vasundhara Raje	Bharatiya Janata Party
2023	Vasundhara Raje	Bharatiya Janata Party

== Election results ==
=== 2023 ===
Rajasthan Legislative Assembly Election, 2023: Jhalrapatan
Party	Candidate	Votes	%	±%
BJP	Vasundhara Raje	138,831	59.51	▲5.37
INC	Ramlal Chouhan	85,638	36.71	▼1.17
BSP	Makasud	3,431	1.47	▲0.22
Indian Peoples Green Party	Pawan Kumar Mehar	2,177	0.93	
NOTA	None of the above	3,194	1.37	▼0.08
Majority		53,193	22.8	▲6.54
Turnout		233,271	78.3	▼0.08
BJP hold		Swing	▲5.37	

=== 2018 ===
Rajasthan Legislative Assembly Election, 2018: Jhalrapatan
Party	Candidate	Votes	%	±%
BJP	Vasundhara Raje	116,484	54.14	
INC	Manvendra Singh	81,504	37.88	
Independent	Shreelal	7,490	3.48	
BSP	Gayas Ahmed Khan	2,684	1.25	
NOTA	None of the above	3,125	1.45	
Majority		34,980	16.26	
Turnout		215,168	78.38	
BJP hold		Swing	▼17.36	

=== 2013 ===
2013 Rajasthan Legislative Assembly election: Jhalrapatan
Party	Candidate	Votes	%	±%
BJP	Vasundhara Raje	114,384	63.14	+6.55
INC	Meenakshi Chandrawat	53,488	29.53	−4.46
NOTA	None of the Above	3,729	2.06	+2.06
BSP	Devlal Dangi	3,100	1.71	−0.41
Majority		60,896	33.61	+11.01
Turnout		1,81,157	79.12	+10.33%
BJP hold		Swing	+6.55%	

=== 2008 ===
2008 Rajasthan Legislative Assembly election: Jhalrapatan
Party	Candidate	Votes	%	±%
BJP	Vasundhara Raje	81,593	56.59	−2.61
INC	Mohan Lal	49,012	33.99	+2.93
BSP	Abdul Quyyum Siddiqui	3,051	2.12	N/A
Majority		32,581	22.59%	+0.32%
Turnout		1,44,186	68.79%	−2.64%
BJP hold		Swing	-2.61%	

=== 2003 ===
2003 Rajasthan Legislative Assembly election: Jhalrapatan
Party	Candidate	Votes	%	±%
BJP	Vasundhara Raje	72,760	59.20	N/A
INC	Rama Pilot	45,385	36.92	N/A
Independent	M. Rafiq	2,387	1.94	N/A
Independent	Jakir Hussain	2,382	1.94	N/A
Majority		27,375	22.28%	N/A
Turnout		1,22,914	71.43%	N/A
BJP hold		Swing	N/A	

== See also ==
- List of constituencies of the Rajasthan Legislative Assembly
- Jhalawar district
