= Hira Singh of Nabha =

Maharaja of Nabha from 1871–1911

Hira Singh
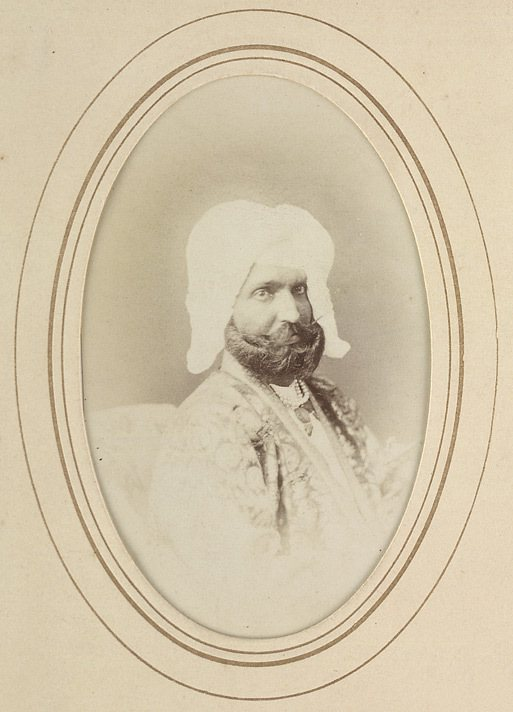
- Reign: 9 June 1871 – 24 December 1911
- Born: 18 December 1843; Badrukhan, Jind State, Gosal (now district Sangrur)
- Died: 24 December 1911 (age 68)
- Spouse: Jasmir Kaur
- Father: Maharaja Sukha Singh Nabha

Sir Hira Singh GCSI GCIE (18 December 1843 – 24 December 1911) was the ruler of Nabha State from 1871 to 1911. Nabha was one of the Phulkian states in the Punjab.

== Early life ==
Hira Singh was born at Badrukhan, Jind, on 18 December 1843, the second son of Sukha Singh (died 1852), from a distant branch of the royal Sikh Phulkian dynasty of Patiala, Jind and Nabha. He was a descendant of Raja Gajpat Singh of Jind, being the great-grandson of his grandson. Little is known about his early life. He was the head of a village until he was called upon to succeed the throne of Nabha.

== Rule ==
In 1871, the line of the Phulkian dynasty which had ruled Nabha, a small 11-gun state, since 1718 became extinct upon the death from tuberculosis of the young Raja, Bhagwan Singh (1842–1871). The remaining two lines of the dynasty-the rulers of Patiala and Jind-in conjunction with the British government fixed upon Hira Singh Gosal as the successor to the Nabha gadi (throne). Hira Singh ascended the throne of Nabha on 9 June 1871 and began a long and successful reign that would usher Nabha into the modern era. Great monuments and public buildings were erected, roads, railways, hospitals, schools and palaces were constructed and an efficient modern army established that saw service during the Second Afghan War and the Tirah Expedition. As well, agriculture flourished with the construction of an irrigation canal at Sirhind, and Nabha soon produced bountiful harvests of wheat, sugarcane, pulses, millet and cotton, thus enabling the state to increase the value of its land revenue assessments.

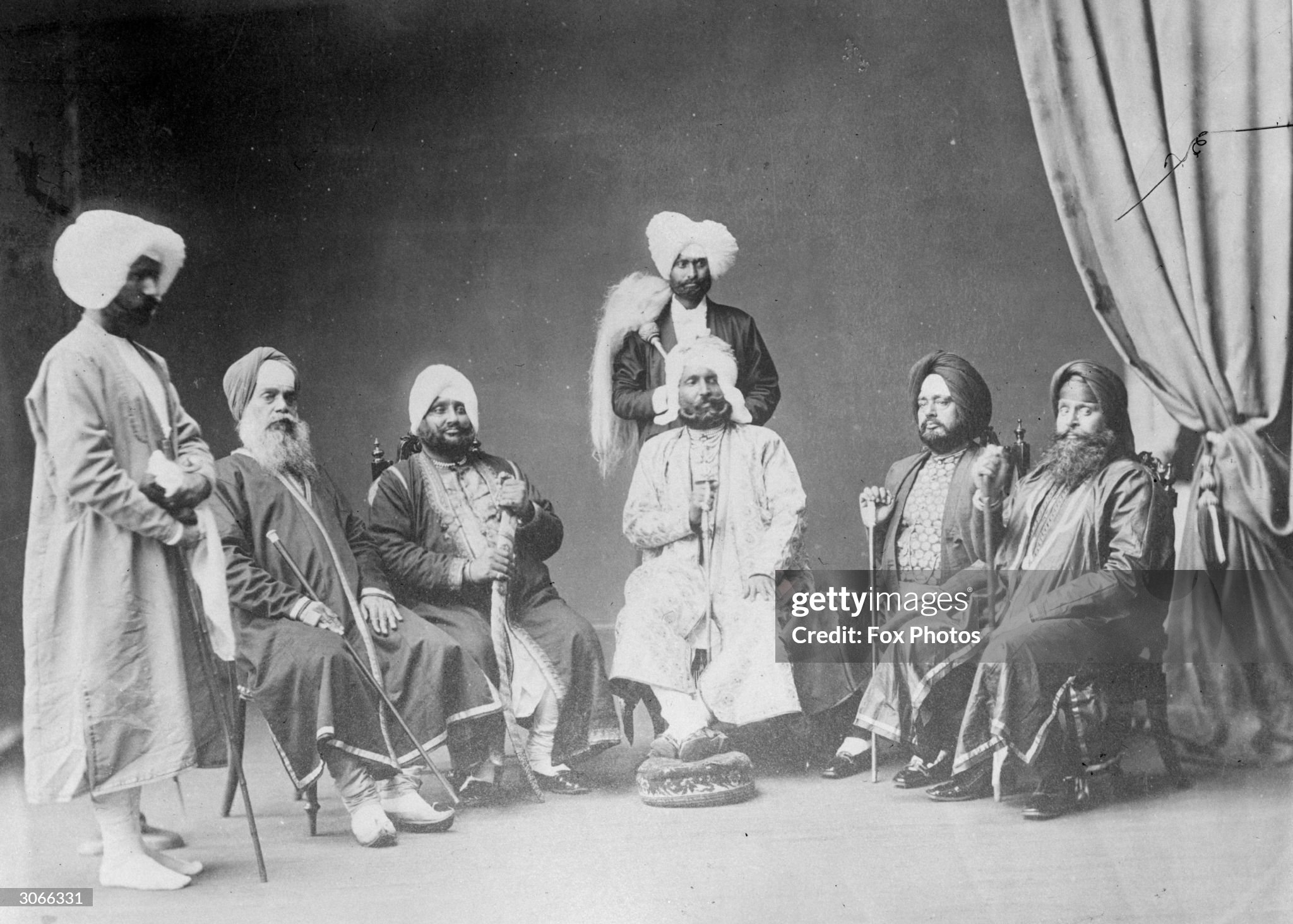
Photograph of Maharaja Hira Singh of Nabha State with officials, Shepherd and Robertson, ca.1870's

As a result of Hira Singh's improvements, in 1877 Nabha was raised to a salute of 13-guns and Hira Singh himself was decorated with the Empress of India Gold Medal and knighted two years later with the GCSI.

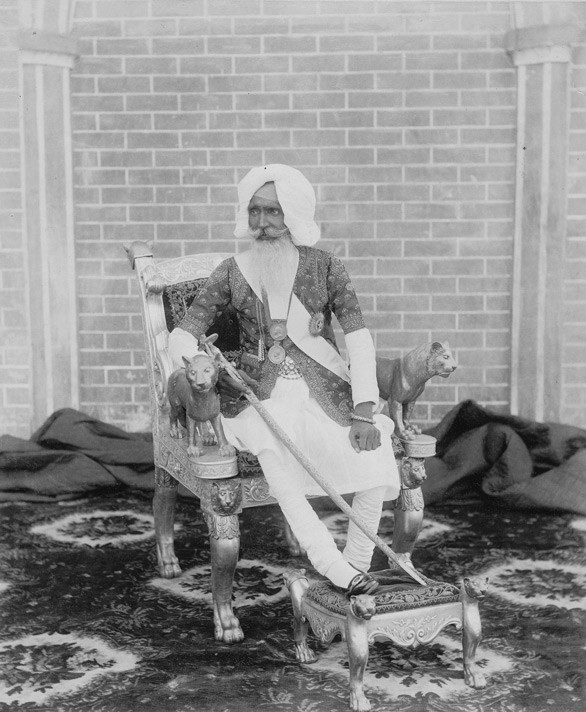
Photograph of Sir Hira Singh, the Raja of Nabha, taken by an unknown photographer in the 1890s.

In 1894, Hira Singh was granted the title of Raja-i-Rajagan and in 1898 was granted a 15-gun personal salute. He attended the 1903 Delhi Durbar to mark the succession of Edward VII as Emperor of India, where he played an important part as one of the senior ruling princes present. He received the honorary rank of Colonel in the Army and was appointed a Knight Grand Commander of the Order of the Indian Empire (GCIE) in the 1903 Durbar Honours on 1 January 1903. He was made a Colonel of the 14th King George's Own Ferozepore Sikhs in the British Indian Army in 1904.

== Death and succession ==
Only a fortnight before his death, Hira Singh was raised to the rank of Maharaja of Nabha. Hira Singh died at the Hira Mahal on Christmas Eve 1911, aged 68 after a four-decade reign. He was succeeded by his only son, Ripudaman Singh.

== Legacy ==
Valentine Cameron Prinsep stated the following on Hira Singh:

On Wednesday I had my last sitting of Nabha, and in that afternoon of Thursday went to bid him [Hira Singh] adieu. He was most polite, and set me on his throne of state, while he occupied a lowly chair by my side. He was not born in the purple [royalty], and was once only the head of a village, till called to the guddee [throne] by the death of his cousin. This accounts for his modesty and a certain manliness not found in porphyrogenitous rajahs

— Valentine Cameron Prinsep, Imperial India, An Artist's Journals (1879), page 257

== Family ==
Hira Singh married four times and had two children, a son and a daughter

- 1. Karangarhwalia; married in 1858
- 2. Aonanliwali Rani;
- 3. Jasmir Kaur (d 1921). Married in 1880 and had one son and one daughter:
  - Ripaduman Singh, who succeeded to the Nabha throne as Maharaja Ripudaman Singh (1883–1942); r. 1911–1928.
  - Ripudaman Devi (1881–1911); married Ram Singh
- 4.wife; Khachedu bai

== Honours ==
- Prince of Wales gold medal-1876
- Empress of India Medal-1877
- Knight Grand Commander of the Order of the Star of India (GCSI)-1879
- Knight Grand Commander of the Order of the Indian Empire (GCIE)-1903
- Delhi Durbar gold medal-1903
- Delhi Durbar gold medal-1911
