= Saramad-i-Rajha-i-Hindustan =

Indian princely title

Saramad-i-Rajha-i-Hindustan (also spelled Saramad-i-Rajah-i-Hindustan; lit. 'Head of the Rajas of Hindustan') is a royal title in the Indian subcontinent. It was used by the Maharajas of Jaipur and Jodhpur.

== Variations ==
- Saramad Rajha-i-Hind was used by the Maharaj Rana of Dholpur.
- Saramad-i-Rajha-i-Bundelkhand (lit. 'Head of the Rajas of Bundelkhand') was used by the Maharaja of Orchha.
