= Pratap Singh of Nabha =

Last ruling Maharaja of Nabha from 1928 to 1948

Sir Pratap Singh Nabha, KCSI
- Maharaja of Nabha
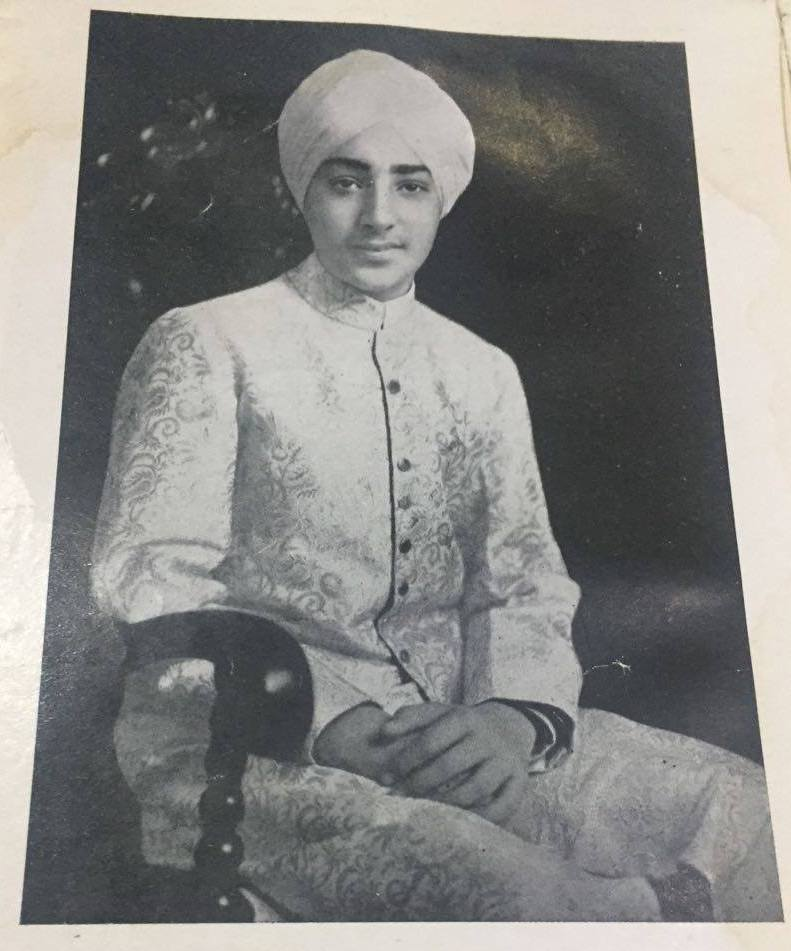
- Photograph of Pratap Singh of Nabha seated on a chair

Maharaja of Nabha
- Reign: 1928–1995
- Predecessor: Ripudaman Singh
- Successor: Position and titles abolished
- Born: 21 September 1919; Nabha State, Punjab Province, British India
- Died: 22 July 1995 (aged 75); New Delhi, Delhi, India
- Spouse: Urmila Devi
- Issue: Hanuwant Singh; Hemant Singh; Himmat Singh; Sneh Lata Kaur
- Dynasty: Phulkian (by Birth) Bamrolia (by Adoption)
- Father: Ripudaman Singh
- Mother: Sarojini Devi

Sir Pratap Singh Nabha, KCSI (21 September 1919 – 22 July 1995) was the last ruling Maharaja of Nabha and a member of the Phulkian dynasty. After India's independence in 1947, Singh acceded to India and the state of Nabha was merged into the Patiala and East Punjab States Union, a then newly formed state, in 1948.

== Early life and education ==
Pratap Singh was born in Nabha State on 21 September 1919 and he was the eldest son and heir of Maharaja Ripudaman Singh. He was also a member of the Phulkian dynasty. His father, Ripudaman, was deposed by the British Raj in 1928 for sedition. Singh became the Maharaja and Nabha State was placed under minority administration. Singh began his schooling at the Anglo-Indian school, Woodstock, in Mussoorie. He was educated at the Royal Military Academy, Sandhurst and at Badingham College in Surrey.

== Reign ==
Singh assumed ruling powers in 1938. He was appointed a Knight Commander of the Order of the Star of India (KSCI).

== Later life ==
Singh acceded to India after India's independence in 1947, and in 1948, Nabha was merged into the then newly formed state of Patiala and East Punjab States Union (PEPSU). Singh had a career in the military and eventually reached the rank of Colonel. After India's independence, he served as aide-de-camp to the President of India, as well as the Colonel of the Sikh Regiment.

Singh was the President of the Wildlife Preservation Society of India and also assisted in the growth of the Vintage Automobile Association of India. He and the other princely families were stripped of their ranks and titles by Indira Gandhi's government in 1971 through the 26th Amendment to the Constitution of India. Singh died in New Delhi on 22 July 1995.

== Family ==
On 25 April 1944, Singh married Urmila Devi (1924–1997), the daughter of Maharaj-Rana Udai Bhan Singh of Dholpur. The couple had one daughter and three sons:

- 1. Sneh Lata Kaur (1947-). Married the Maharaja of Orchha in 1971 and has one son and three daughters.
- 2. Hanuwant Singh (5 December 1948 – 30 June 2017). His heir is Yudhister Singh (b. 5 December 1972).
- 3. Hemant Singh (1951-). He was as adopted his maternal grandfather, Udai Bhan Singh, and succeeded him as Maharaj-Rana of Dholpur.
- 4. Himmat Singh (1952-). Married a Nepalese princess in 1976 and has a son and daughter. The son was named Kunwar Bhanu Pratap Singh, who married Rani Preeti Singh (daughter of Chandroday Singh Parihar) and has son named Kunwar Abhiudaypratap Singh.

== Titles ==
- 1919-1928: Shri Tikka Sahib Pratap Singh
- 1928-1941: His Highness Farzand-i-Arjumand, Aqidat-Paiwand-i-Daulat-i-Inglishia, Barar Bans Sarmur, Raja-i-Rajagan, Maharaja Shri Pratap Singh Malvendra Bahadur, Maharaja of Nabha
- 1941-1944: Lieutenant His Highness Farzand-i-Arjumand, Aqidat-Paiwand-i-Daulat-i-Inglishia, Barar Bans Sarmur, Raja-i-Rajagan, Maharaja Shri Pratap Singh Malvendra Bahadur, Maharaja of Nabha
- 1944-1945: Captain His Highness Farzand-i-Arjumand, Aqidat-Paiwand-i-Daulat-i-Inglishia, Barar Bans Sarmur, Raja-i-Rajagan, Maharaja Shri Pratap Singh Malvendra Bahadur, Maharaja of Nabha
- 1945-1 January 1946: Lieutenant-Colonel His Highness Farzand-i-Arjumand, Aqidat-Paiwand-i-Daulat-i-Inglishia, Barar Bans Sarmur, Raja-i-Rajagan, Maharaja Shri Pratap Singh Malvendra Bahadur, Maharaja of Nabha
- 1 January-15 October 1946: Lieutenant-Colonel His Highness Farzand-i-Arjumand, Aqidat-Paiwand-i-Daulat-i-Inglishia, Barar Bans Sarmur, Raja-i-Rajagan, Maharaja Shri Sir Pratap Singh Malvendra Bahadur, Maharaja of Nabha, KCSI
- 15 October 1946 – 1995: Colonel His Highness Farzand-i-Arjumand, Aqidat-Paiwand-i-Daulat-i-Inglishia, Barar Bans Sarmur, Raja-i-Rajagan, Maharaja Shri Sir Pratap Singh Malvendra Bahadur, Maharaja of Nabha, KCSI

== Honours ==
(ribbon bar, as it would look today)

- King George V Silver Jubilee Medal-1935
- King George VI Coronation Medal-1937
- 1939-1945 Star-1945
- War Medal 1939-1945-1945
- India Service Medal-1945
- Knight Commander of the Order of the Star of India (KCSI)-1946
- Indian Independence Medal-1947
