= Emery Kelen =

Hungarian caricaturist

- Born: 1896; Győr, Hungary
- Died: 1978 (aged 81–82); Vienna, Austria
- Known for: Caricature
- Spouse: Betty Stones
- Children: Juli Kelen

Emery (also spelt as Imre or Emerich) Kelen (1896–1978) was a Hungarian caricaturist.

== Biography ==
He was born in 1896 in Győr, Hungary. He enrolled in an art school in Vienna; however, with the outbreak of World War I, he was drafted into the Austro-Hungarian army. While on the battlefield, he contracted typhus and was sent to a hospital in Croatia to recover. After his recovery, he was called to the front; however, he was found to be overwhelmed by his war experience and sent to a military insane hospital in Trnava. He began his career as a caricaturist by drawing caricatures of the statesmen who attended the Paris Peace Conference in 1919. Shortly afterward, he moved to Switzerland. There, in collaboration with another Hungarian Jew, Alois Derso, he worked for fifteen years at the League of Nations in Geneva. Their work, signed as Kelen-Derso, appeared in numerous European newspapers and gained global recognition. Besides the League of Nations, he also created caricatures at the 1925 Locarno Conference, the 1933 London Economic Conference, and the 1932 World Disarmament Conference. In 1938, he emigrated to the United States. There, he continued his collaboration with Derso until 1950.

He married Betty Stones on 25 September 1940, and they had one child, Juli Kelen. He died in 12 October, 1978 in Vienna, Austria.

== Honours ==
He won the Hungarian Military Cross in the WW1.

== Gallery ==
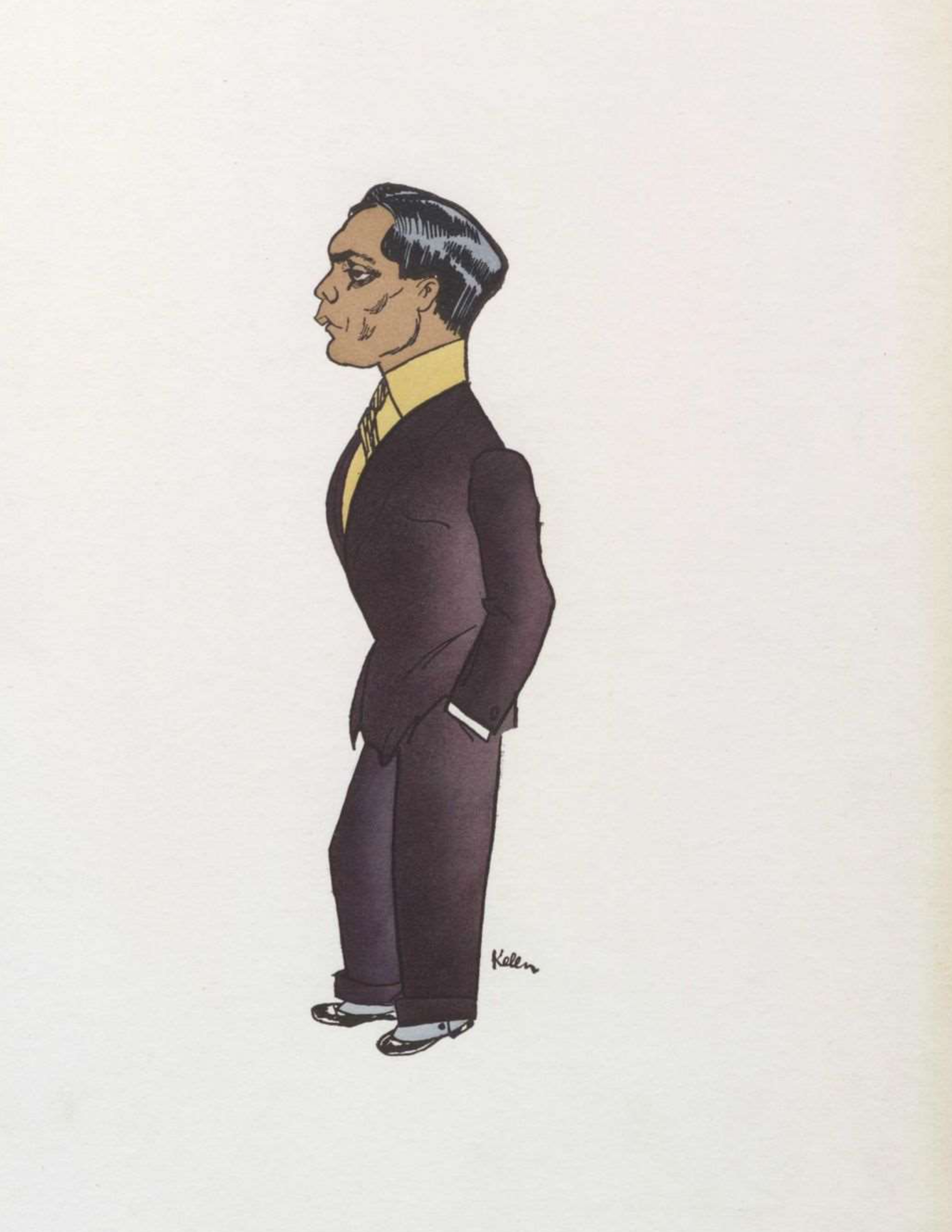
Hamidullah Khan, c. 1930

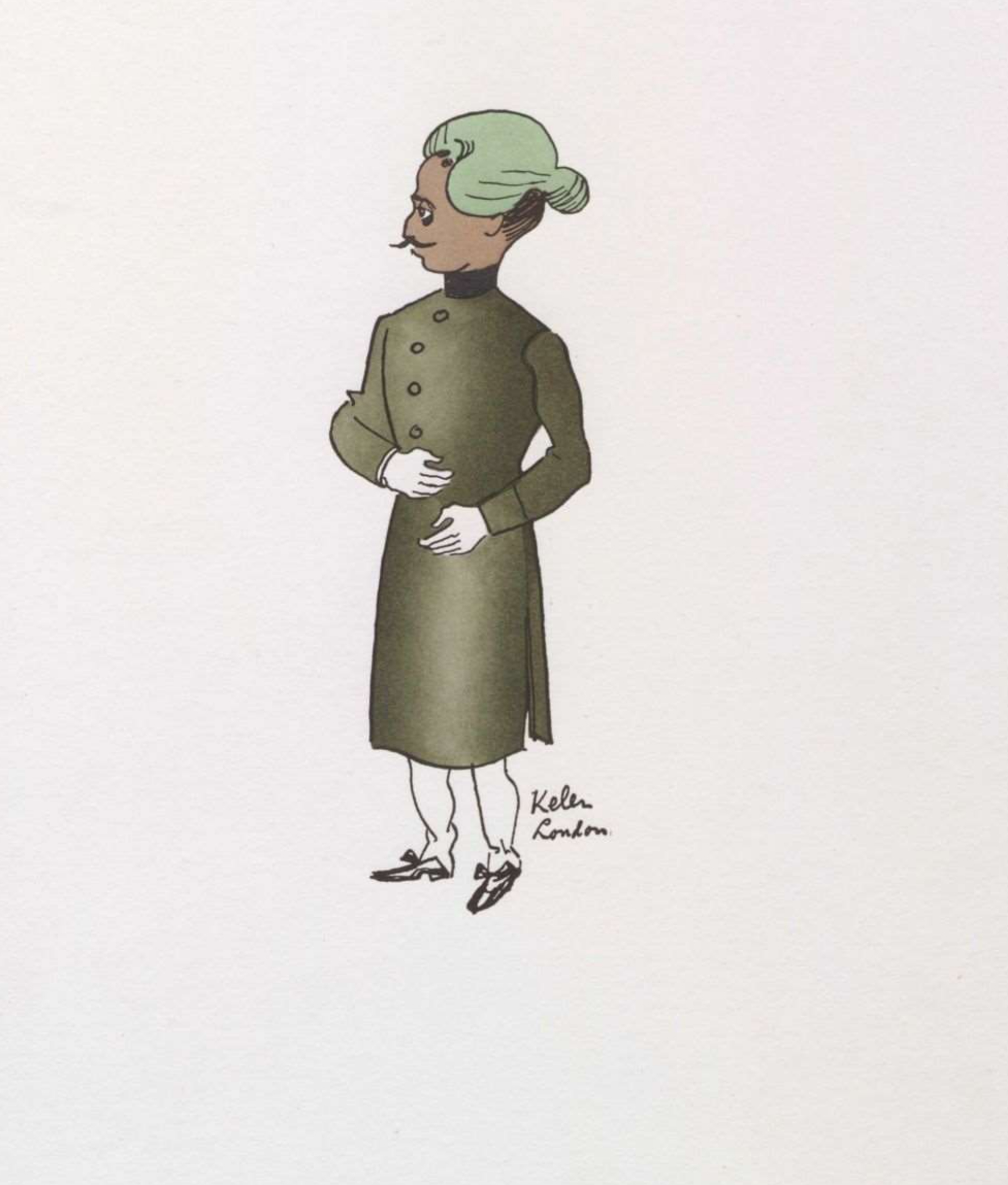
Udai Bhan Singh, c. 1930

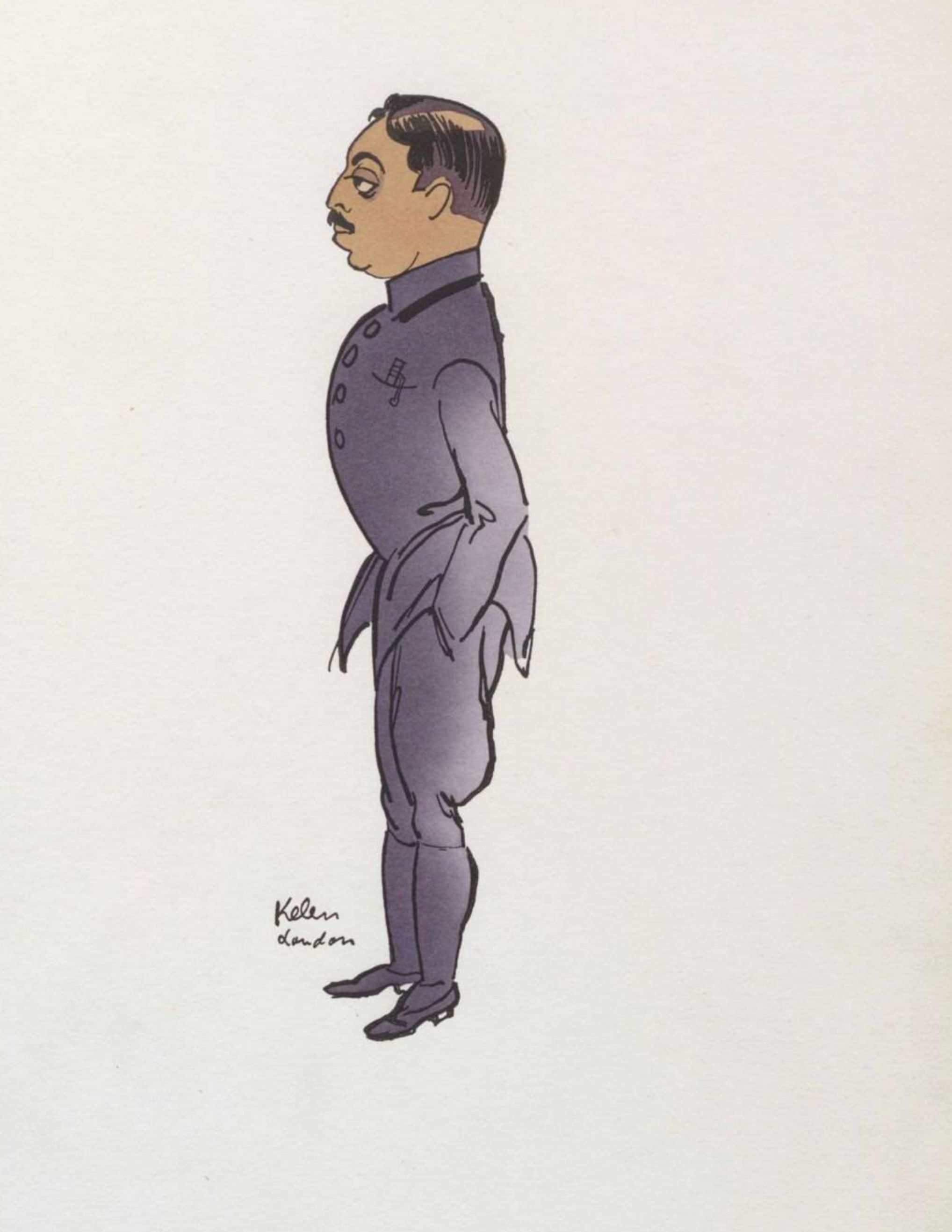
Maharaja of Rewa, c. 1930

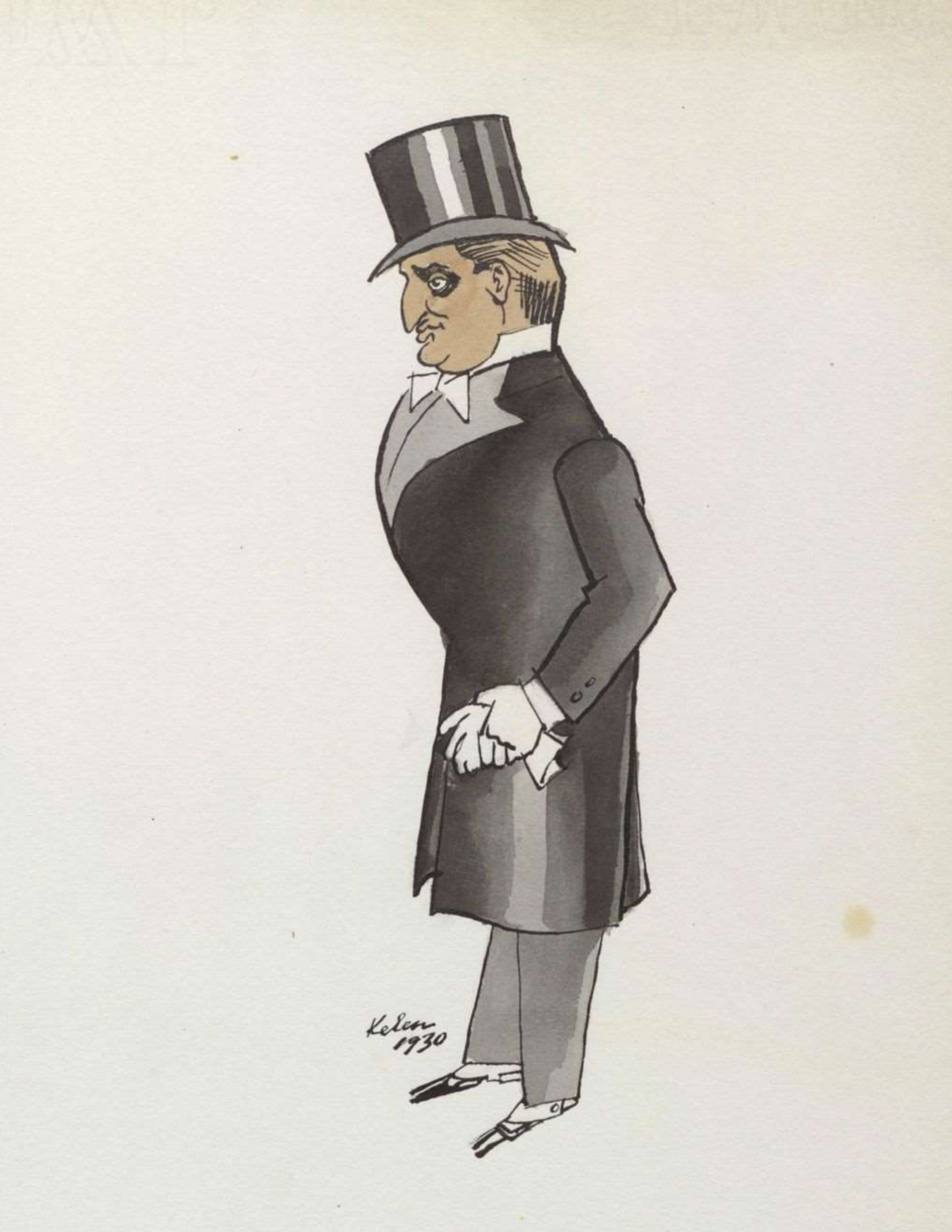
Hari Singh, c. 1930

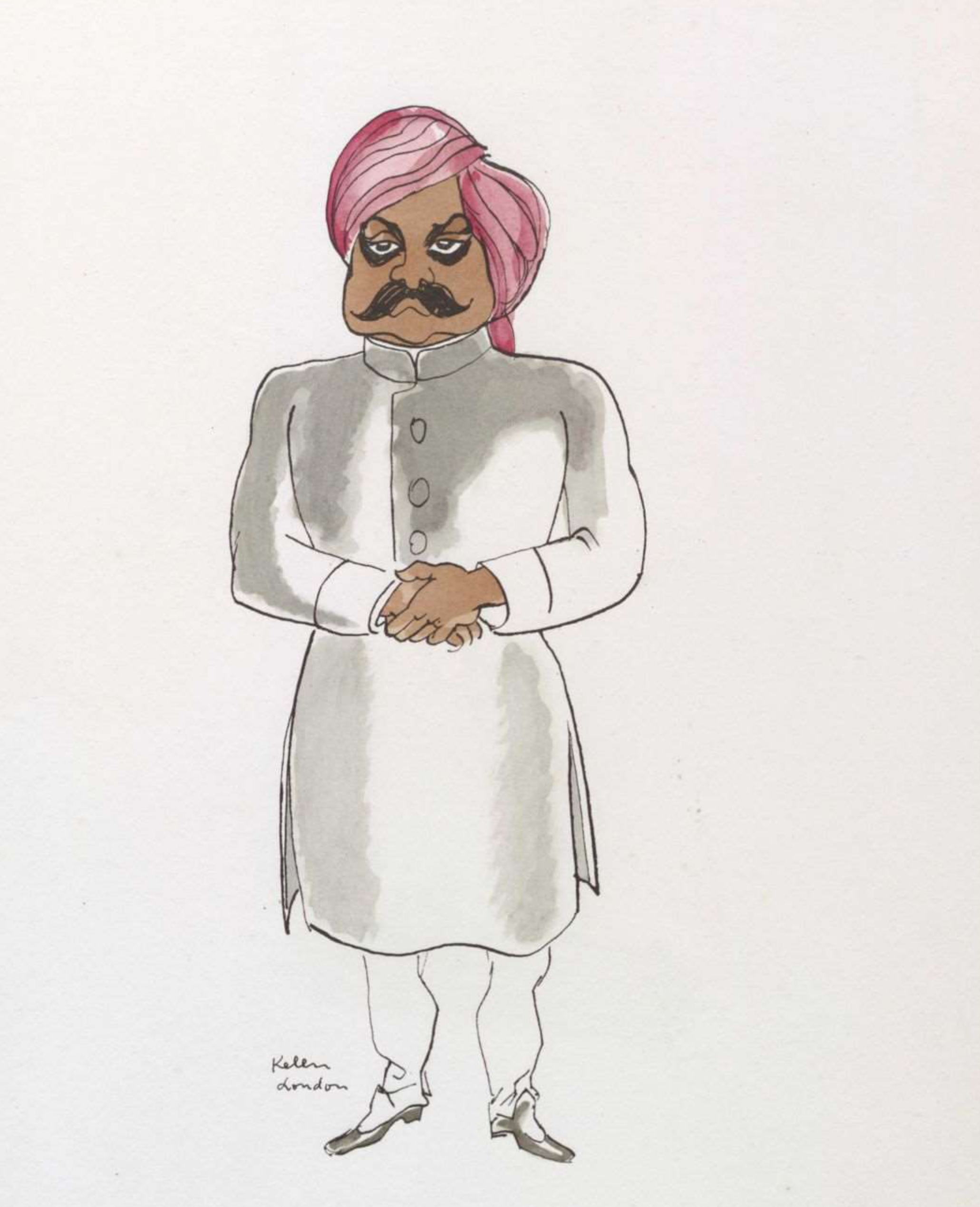
Krushna Chandra Gajapati, c. 1930

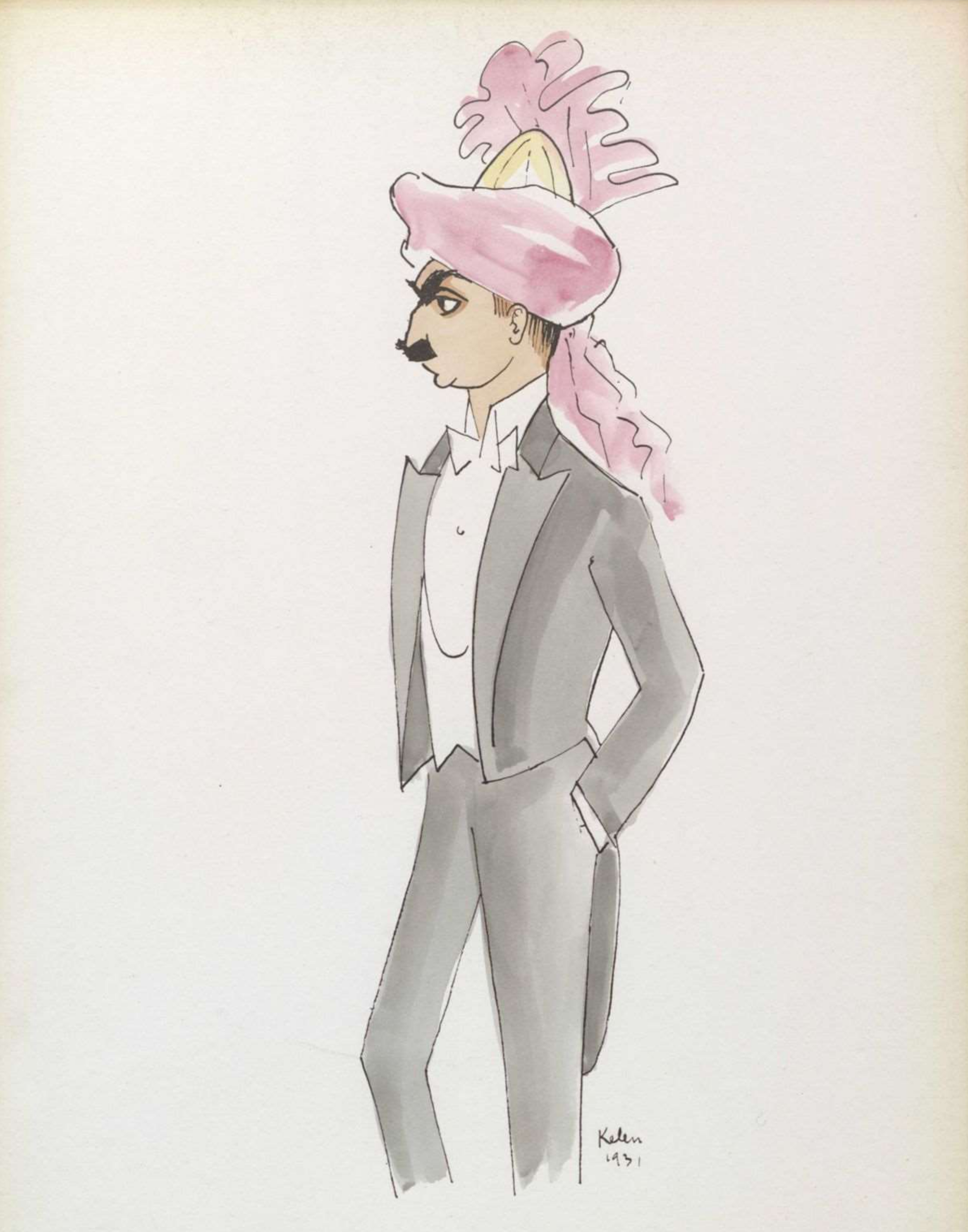
Liaqat Hayat Khan, c. 1930
