= Ripudaman Singh =

Maharaja of Nabha from 1911–1928

- Maharaja of Nabha
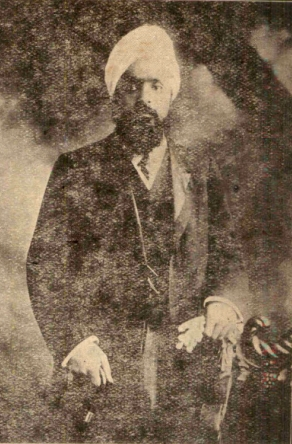

Maharaja of Nabha
- Reign: 1911 - 1928
- Born: 4 March 1883; Nabha, Nabha State
- Died: 12 December 1942 (aged 59); Kodaikanal, Madras Presidency British India
- Spouse: Jagdish Kaur; Sarojini Devi; Gurcharan Kaur
- Issue: Pratap Singh Nabha
- Father: Hira Singh Nabha
- Mother: Jasmir Kaur

Maharaja Ripudaman Singh (4 March 1883 – 12 December 1942), later known as Sardar Gurcharan Singh, was the Maharaja of Nabha State, a small princely state during the British Raj, from 1911 to 1928, when he was deposed by the British. He later became an Indian revolutionary.

== Early life ==
Ripu Daman Singh was born on 4 March 1883 at Nabha, the only son and heir of Hira Singh Nabha. From 1906 to 1908, he was a member of the Imperial Legislative Council of India, where he spoke on behalf of the Sikh interest and pioneered reformist legislation. He represented Nabha in 1911 at the coronation of King George V. His father, Hira Singh, against the advice of the British, did not send Ripudaman Singh to Aitchinson College in Lahore for his education, rather choosing Kahn Singh of Nabha to educate him in a traditional manner between 1887 and 1893, including a learning of Sikh scripture. This relationship between Ripudaman Singh and Kahn Singh is the reason cited as to why Ripudaman Singh was affiliated with the Tat Khalsa interpretation of Sikhism rather than the Sanatan Sikh school, which his father was aligned with.

Ripudaman Singh would serve in various administrative positions in his early life, such as being the personal secretary of his father. In 1905, acting on behalf of the Chief Khalsa Diwan, Ripudaman Singh successfully petitioned the British to ban idol worship on both the inner and outer parkrama of the Golden Temple in Amritsar, claiming it was a non-Sikh practice, which angered his father when he found out, who suspended him from his position of the vakil (ambassador) of Nabha State. When Ripudaman Singh served in the Punjab Legislative Council between 1906–08, he sponsored the Sikh Anand Marriage Act and pushed for legislation regarding Sikh management of their shrines.

In 1907, Ripudaman Singh and Max Arthur Macauliffe tried to petition the Imperial Legislative Council to sponsor another translation attempt of the Sikh scripture, as Ernest Trumpp's earlier attempt was offensive to the Sikhs. He also was the primary figure behind the Sikh Educational Conferences, with the first being held in 1908. Ripudaman Singh and Kahn Singh established the Central Khalsa Diwan in 1909, in-response to Sundar Singh Majithia meddling with Tat Khalsa ideals within the Chief Khalsa Diwan, however the Central Khalsa Diwan became defunct when Ripudaman ascended to the Nabha throne in 1911.

== Maharaja ==
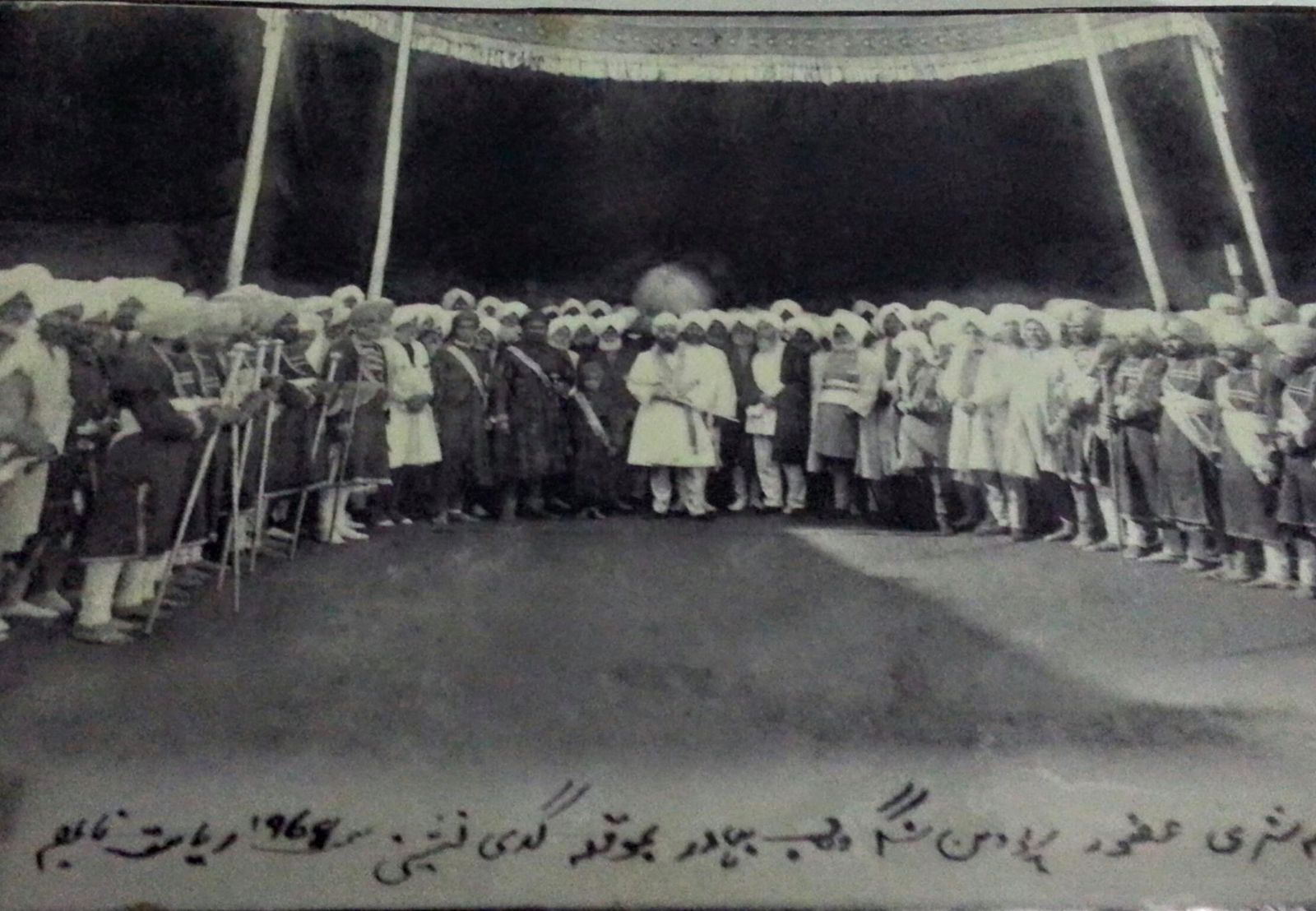
Photograph of the coronation of Maharaja Ripudaman Singh of Nabha State, February 1912

Upon his father's death in 1911, Ripudaman Singh ascended the gadi of Nabha; though recognised as Maharaja, he refused to be crowned by the Viceroy of India as was then the norm for a senior ruling prince in India. Continuing his interest in legal affairs, he reformed the state judiciary and enacted numerous pieces of progressive legislation, including laws providing for female education and a progressive marriage act. He also established a legislature and an executive council to govern Nabha. In 1912, he became a judge of the Nabha High Court.

A staunch Indian nationalist, Ripudaman Singh befriended Lala Lajpat Rai and other prominent leaders of the swaraj movement. During the First World War, he refused to contribute Nabha state force contingents for the British Indian Army. As a result, he was arguably the only Indian ruler who did not receive any British war service-related honours. Shocked by the events of the Amritsar Massacre of Jalianwala Bagh in 1919, he publicly opposed the British, clashing with his distant cousin Bhupinder Singh of Patiala, who was a strong supporter of British rule in India.

Ripudaman Singh was granted a local salute of 15-guns in 1921, but he would not stay in British favour for much longer. In 1923, he was forced to relinquish control of Nabha to a British administrator after he was suspected of kidnapping and attempted murder through poisoning.

== Deposition ==
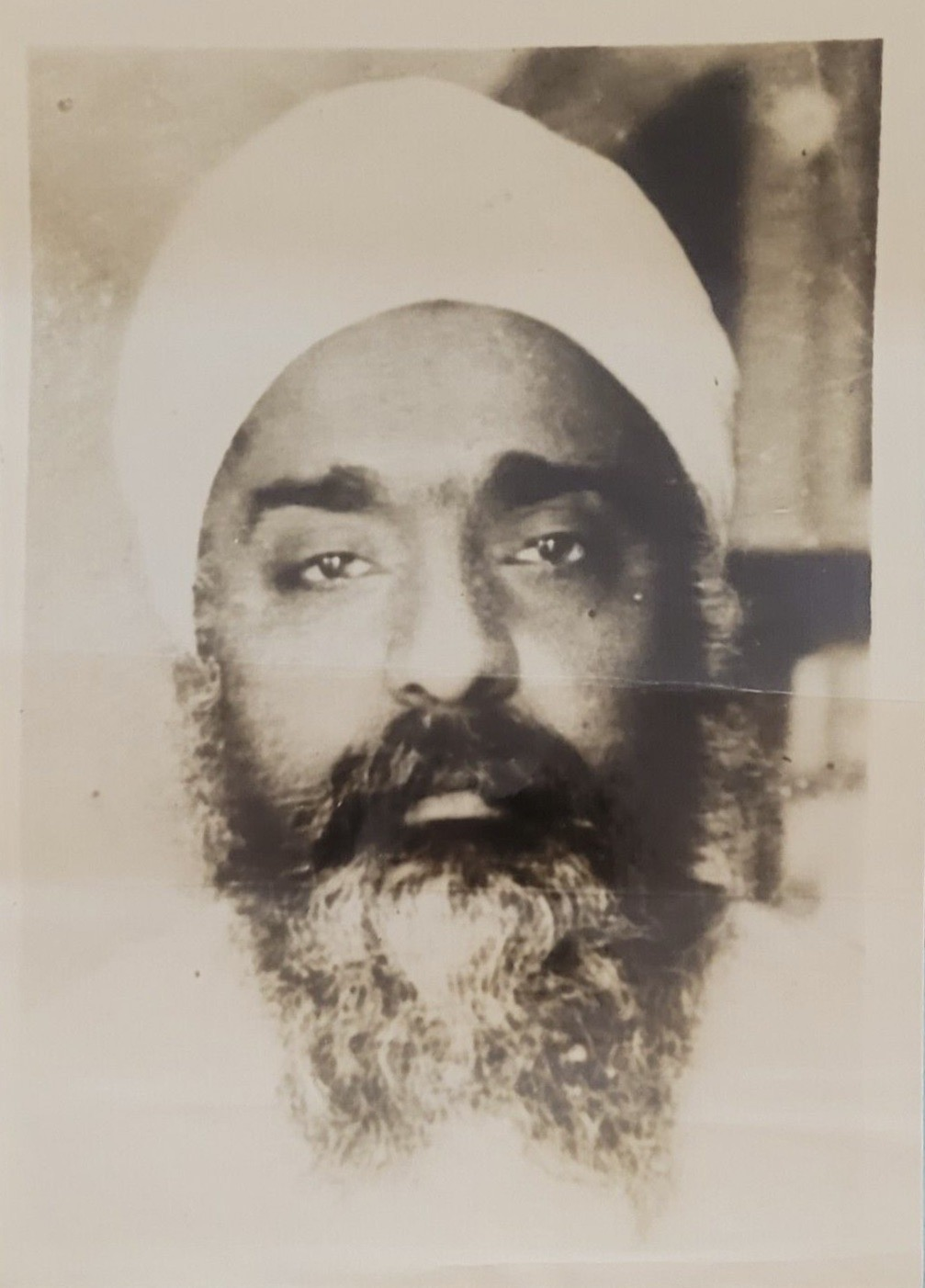
Photograph of Ripudaman Singh of Nabha State, later known as Gurcharan Singh, after his abdication, 1929

In 1923, Ripudaman Singh agreed to leave Nabha and to settle at Dehradun. For this he was granted by the British a large allowance. However, he continued to intrigue and attempt to regain control of Nabha to some degree. In 1927, he went on pilgrimage to Sri Abichal Nagar Hazur Sahib and retook the Khalsa initiation rites, taking the name of Gurcharan Singh. The next year, he was formally deposed by the British for sedition and succeeded by his eldest son, Pratap Singh Nabha in 1928. He was stripped of his rank and titles and exiled to Kodaikanal in the Madras Presidency. Thereafter, he was known officially as Gurcharan Singh.

== Death ==
Ripudaman Singh died at Kodaikanal (in Tamil Nadu) on 12 December 1942, aged 59.

== Family ==
Ripudaman Singh married three times, twice to ladies of royal blood and once morganatically:

- 1. Jagdish Kaur (1884-20 February 1925). Married at Nabha in 1901. They had a daughter:
  - Amar Kaur (8 October 1907-)
- 2. Sarojni Devi (1898-19?). Married at Nabha 10 October 1918 and had issue:
  - 1. Kharak Singh, who succeeded as Maharaja of Nabha
  - 2. Kharak Singh (d. 1970 in Canada)
  - 3. Gurbaksh Singh (d November 1963) Married in 1950 Princess Chandra Prabha Kumari of Rajpipla (11 November 1932 – 22 October 2012, daughter of Vijaysinhji I of Rajpipla). They had one son and two daughters:
    - Viveck Singh
    - Krishna Kumari (1951–1994)
    - Tuhina Kumari
  - 4. Kamla Devi Sahiba
  - 5. Vimla Devi Sahiba
- a. Gurcharan Kaur (1904–1983). Married Gurcharan Kaur in 1923 and had issue:
  - 1. Narinder Singh (1924-). A son and a daughter.
  - 2. Fateh Singh (1935-). Two sons.
  - 3. Jasmer Singh
  - 4. Shamsher Singh
  - 5. Vijay Kaur
  - 6. Charanjeet Kaur. Two sons.
  - 7. Nandhem Kaur

== Titles ==
- 1883-1911: Sri Tikka Sahib Ripudaman Singh
- 1911-1927: His Highness Farzand-i-Arjumand, Aqidat-Paiwand-i-Daulat-i-Angrezistan, Brar Bains Sarmour, Raja-i-Rajagan, Maharaja Shri Ripudaman Singh Malvinder Bahadur, Maharaja of Nabha
- 1927-1928: His Highness Farzand-i-Arjumand, Aqidat-Paiwand-i-Daulat-i-Angrezistan, Brar Bains Sarmour, Raja-i-Rajagan, Maharaja Shri Gurcharan Singh Malvinder Bahadur, Maharaja of Nabha
- 1928-1942: Sardar Gurcharan Singh

== Honours ==
- Fellow of the Royal Geographical Society (FRGS)
- Delhi Durbar Medal-1903
- King George V Coronation Medal w/Delhi Durbar Clasp-1911
