= Shobha Ram Kumawat =

Indian freedom fighter (1914–1984)

- शोभा राम कुमावत
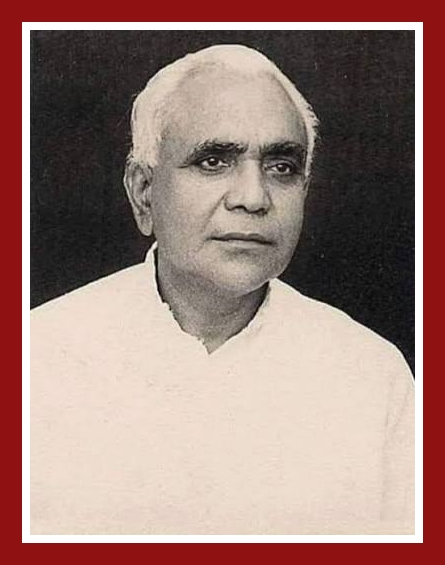
- Born: 7 January 1914; Kathumar village, Alwar princely state, Rajputana Agency, British India
- Died: 23 March 1984 (aged 70); Jaipur city, Rajasthan state, Republic of India
- Other name: Babu Shobha Ram
- Education: Inter, Rishi College, Alwar; BCom; MA Economics; LLB, Sanatan Dharma College, Kanpur
- Occupation: Farmer | Advocate | Politician
- Known for: Indian freedom fighter; Member of Parliament (Lok Sabha, Lower House); Chief of Rajasthan Pradesh Congress Committee; Member of Rajasthan Legislative Assembly
- Title: Chief Minister of United States of Matsya
- Term: 1948 – 1949
- Political party: Indian National Congress
- Movement: Quit India Movement
- Spouse: Ram Pyari Kumawat (married 1932–84)
- Children: 5 daughters

Shobha Ram Kumawat (7 January 1914 – 23 March 1984) was an Indian Independence activist and Politician from the Indian National Congress political party and was a Member of Parliament of the 1st Lok Sabha and 2nd Lok Sabha representing the Alwar Parliamentary Constituency in the Rajasthan state of India.

== Early life and education ==
Shobha Ram Kumawat was born to father Buddha Ram Kumawat and mother Jhuntha Devi Kumawat on 7 January 1914 in Kathumar of Alwar princely state in Rajputana Agency, British India.

He got his education from Raj Rishi College of Alwar (Inter) and Sanatan Dharma College of Kanpur (BCom; MA in economics; LLB). Shobha Ram Kumawat was married on 12 December 1932 with Ram Pyari Kumawat.

Shobha Ram Kumawat died of cardiac arrest (heart attack) on 23 March 1984 in Jaipur, Rajasthan state, India.

== Political career ==
Shobha Ram Kumawat was the first and only chief minister of the United States of Matsya, serving from its formation on 18 March 1948 until it was merged into the United State of Rajasthan on 15 May 1949. Following that he was the first Revenue Minister of the Rajasthan government from 1949 to 1950. In 1952 he was elected as a member of the 1st Lok Sabha for the Alwar Lok Sabha constituency. He was elected again in 1957 for the 2nd Lok Sabha but lost his chair in 1962 in the elections for the 3rd Lok Sabha. Following that he was member of the Rajasthan Legislative Assembly on the fourth (1967–72) and fifth (1972–77) assemblies.

Shobha Ram Kumawat also served as the head of the Rajasthan Pradesh Congress Committee.

=== Political offices held ===
- Chief minister (only) of Matsya Union (1948–49)
- Member of All India Congress Committee (1948–50)
- Revenue Minister (first) of the Government of Rajasthan (1949–50)
- Member of Parliament of 1st Lok Sabha (1952–57)
- State President of Rajasthan Pradesh Congress Committee (1956–57)
- Member of Parliament of 2nd Lok Sabha (1957–62)
- First Chairman of Urban Improvement Trust, Alwar (1966–67)
- Member of 4th Rajasthan Legislative Assembly (1967–72)
- Agriculture Minister of Rajasthan (1967–71)
- Finance Minister of Rajasthan (1971–72)
- Member of 5th Rajasthan Legislative Assembly (1972–77)
