= Dholpur State =

Former kingdom in the Indian subcontinent

Coordinates: 26.7°N 77.9°E

- 1805–1949
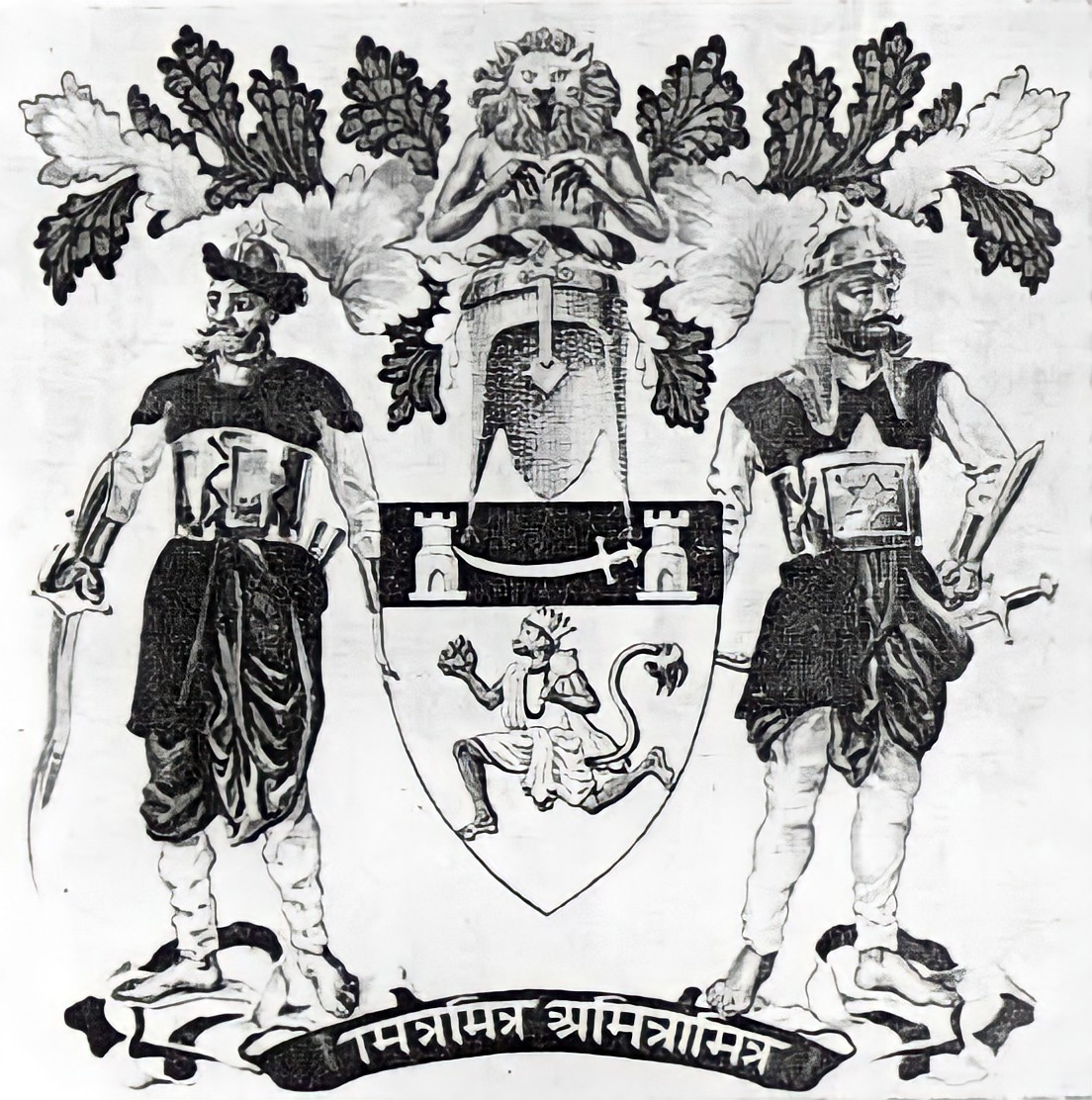
- Flag Coat of arms

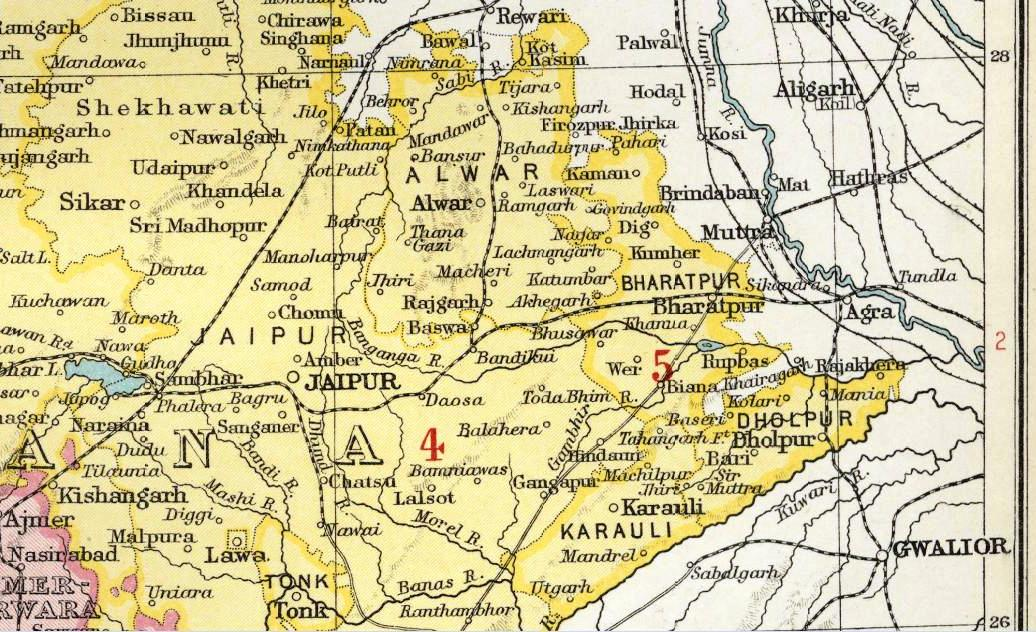
- Dholpur State in the Imperial Gazetteer of India
- Capital: Dholpur
- Area
  - 1901: 3,038 km^{2} (1,173 sq mi)
- Population
  - 1901: 318,347
- Government
  - Type: Sovereign monarchy (1805–1818); Princely state (1818–1947); Constitutional monarchy (1947–1949)
- Maharaj Rana
  - 1805–1835: Kirat Singh (first)
  - 1911–1949: Udai Bhan Singh (last)
- History
  - Established: 1805
  - Independence of India: 1949
| Preceded by | Succeeded by |
| Gohad State; Maratha Empire | Matsya Union |
- Today part of: India · Rajasthan

Dholpur State or Dhaulpur State, ruled by Bamrolia Jat Dynasty was an independent kingdom from 1805 to 1818 and a princely state under British suzerainty from 1818 to 1949 in eastern Rajasthan. It was founded by Rana Kirat Singh, the ruler of Gohad, in 1805 AD. Dholpur State was a salute state entitled to a 15 gun-salute official and 17 gun-salute Personal. The state was merged into the Union of India in April 1949 and Udai Bhan Singh was the last ruling Maharaj-Rana of Dholpur.

== History ==
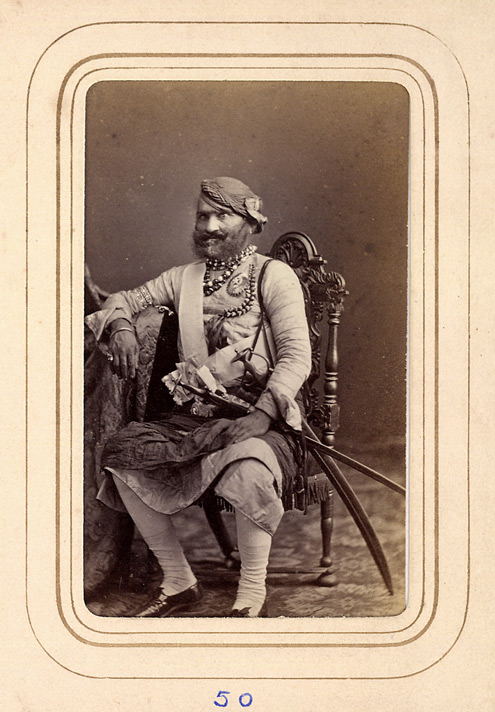
Maharaj Rana Bhagwant Singh in 1870.

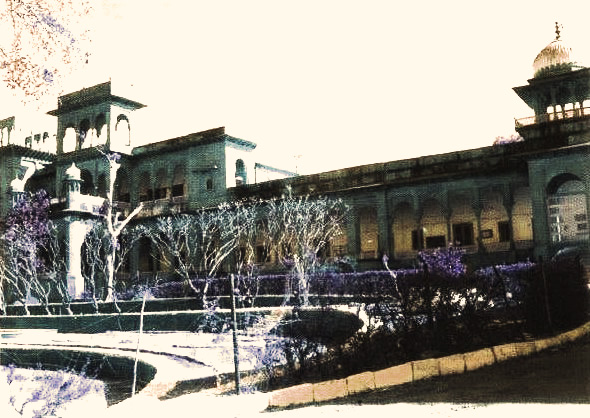
Kesarbagh palace, the mansion of the former ruler of the erstwhile Dholpur State in Dholpur, now Dholpur Military School

Dholpur State, located in present-day Dholpur district of Rajasthan, was established due to British political intervention in Rajputana.

To create a buffer between the Kingdom of Bharatpur and the Marathas, who often allied against them, the British supported the Jats led by Rana Kirat Singh. Jats helped the British to reclaim the Gohad region from the Scindias. As part of an agreement, Rana Kirat Singh was given control of Dholpur, while the British took over Gohad. Thus, Dholpur State was formed, and Rana Kirat Singh declared its ruler in 1805.

The last ruler of Dholpur signed the instrument of accession to the Indian Union on 7 April 1949 and the state was merged in short-lived Matsya Union.

Vasundhara Raje, a former chief minister of Rajasthan, is also a member of the former ruling family of Dholpur.

== Dholpur House ==
The Dholpur House was constructed in 1920 by Maharaj-Rana Udai bhan Singh, the Jat Ruler of erstwhile princely state of Dholpur. It was built for his transit residence whenever he was at Delhi. Dholpur House is located on Shahjahan Road, near India Gate. It was built in the Art Deco style.

Today, the building serves as the headquarters of the Union Public Service Commission. The UPSC conducts interviews at Dholpur House to recruit candidates for the All India Services and Group A services for the Government of India.

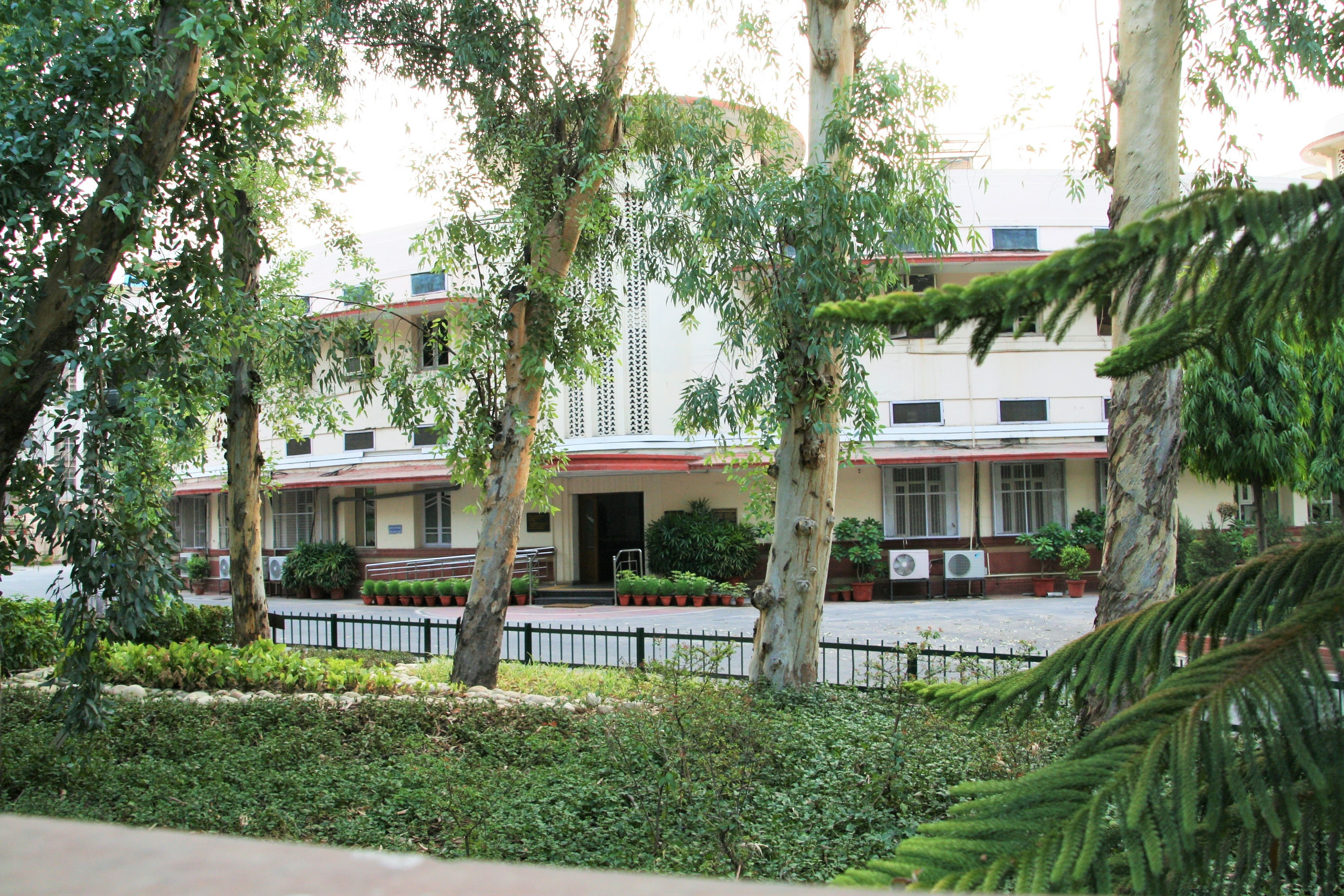
Dholpur House

== Rulers ==
- Shri Kirat Singh ji (1803 – 1805)
- Shri Pohap Singh ji (1836 – 1836)
- Shri Bhagwant Singh ji (1836 – 1873)
- Shri Nihal Singh ji (1873 – 1901)
- Shri Ram Singh ji (1901 – 1911)
- Shri Udai Bhan Singh ji (1911 – 1954)
- Shri Hemant Singh ji (1954 – 1971)
- Shri Dushyant Singh ji (Present Maharajasaheb)
- Shri Vinayak Pratap Singh ji (Yuvrajsabh)

== See also ==
- Gohad State—For early history of Dholpur rulers
- List of Jat dynasties
