= Nabha State =

Phulkian princely state of Punjab during the British Raj in India

Coordinates: 30.37°N 76.15°E

- Princely State
- 1763–1947
- Flag

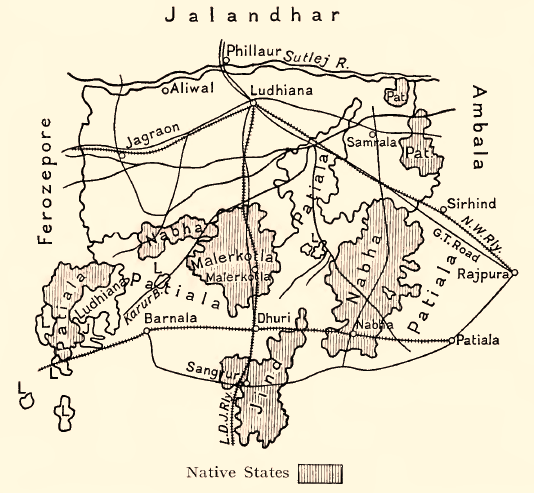
- Nabha State in a 1911 map of Ludhiana district
- Area
  - 1901: 2,502 km^{2} (966 sq mi)
- Population
  - 1901: 297,949
- Historical era: New Imperialism
  - Established: 1763
  - Accession to the Dominion of India: 1947
Preceded by	Succeeded by
Mughal Empire; Phulkian Misl	Dominion of India
- Today part of: Haryana, Punjab, India

Nabha State, with its capital at Nabha, was one of the Phulkian princely states of Punjab during the British Raj in India. This state was ruled by Jats Sidhu clan belonging to Sikh religion.

== History ==
=== Origin ===
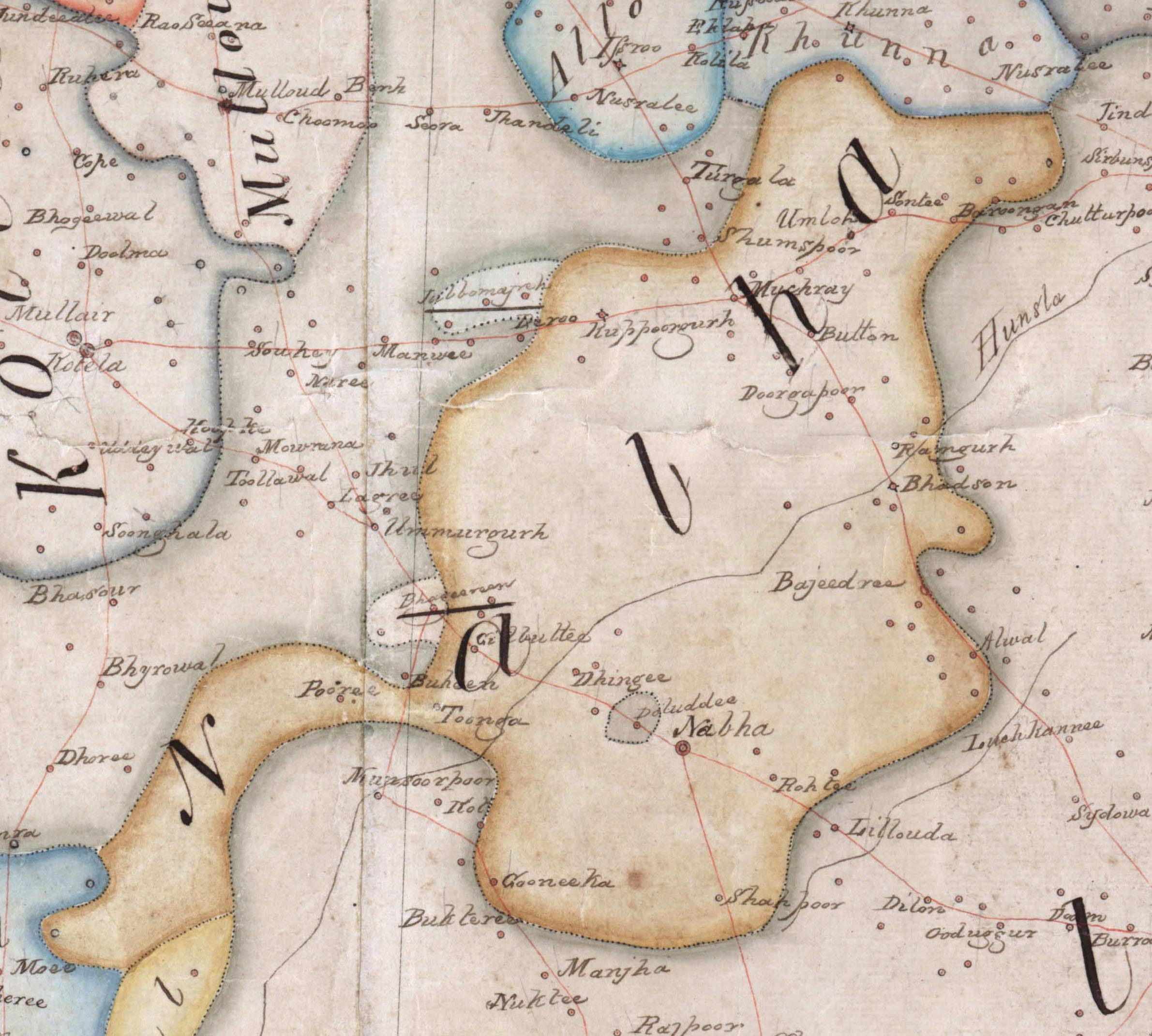
Detail of the main, continuous tract of territory of Nabha State from a map created by the British East India Company, ca.1829–1835 (the state also held many exclave territories that can be seen in the full-map).

The state originated as one of the many chiefdoms the Sikhs had established in the former Mughal province of Delhi after the collapse of Mughal and Afghan authority in the region. The ruling house of Nabha belonged to the Phulkian dynasty, sharing a common ancestor named Tiloka with the Jind rulers. Tiloka (r. 1652–1687) was the eldest son of Phul Sidhu of the Phulkian dynasty. (Note: Tiloka's personal name is alt. latinized as 'Tilokha'.) The Nabha rulers descend from Gurditta (Gurdit Singh; r. 1687–1754), the elder son of Tiloka. Gurditta was the founder of the localities of Dhanaula and Sangrur. Sangrur was the headquarters of the state till it was captured by Jind State. Gurditta died in 1754. His only son Surat (or Suratya) Singh had died two years earlier in 1752, leaving his grandson, Hamir Singh, as the next in line. Hamir Singh was the founder of the locality of Nabha and the first ruler of Nabha State.

=== Foundation of the locality and state ===
The locality of Nabha was founded by Hamir Singh of the Phulkian dynasty in 1755, whilst the state itself was founded slightly after in 1763 by Hamir Singh. The state at that period of time was composed of 12 scattered territories. Hamir Singh died in 1783 and was succeeded by Jaswant Singh. However, a regency was in-place between 1783–1790. Jaswant Singh assumed full control on 1790 and ruled until 1840.

=== Colonial period ===
The rulers of Nabha supported Maharaja Ranjit Singh of Lahore during his expeditions in the cis-Sutlej region. Between 1807 and 1808, the ruler of Nabha was afforded British protection from the threat posed by Ranjit Singh and his encroaching Lahore State.

During the First Anglo-Sikh War (1845–46), due to Raja Davinder Singh’s sympathy with the Sikh Empire, one-fourth of Nabha State's territory, including areas such as Rori pargana and others (such as the estates of Dehraru and Amloh), were confiscated by the British from Nabha. Furthermore, Nabha was not invited to the Governor General's Durbar at Ludhiana.

Raja Davinder Singh was removed from power, and his 7-year-old son, Bharpur Singh, was placed on the throne under British supervision. Some of the annexed territory from the state was given to Patiala State and Faridkot State, while the rest was placed under direct British administration in Punjab Province.

Nabha State under Raja Bharpur Singh was loyal to the British during the Indian Mutiny of 1857 and forwarded the British a loan of two and a half lakh rupees. After the way, they were given the grant of Bawal territory as a reward. At the Ambala Darbar held in Ambala between 18–20 January 1860, a decision was made to exempt Nabha, Patiala, and Jind states from the doctrine-of-lapse.

Hira Singh reigned from 1861 to 1911 and was an effective ruler. In 1911, Hira Singh took-on the maharaja title. Hira Singh was succeeded by his son Ripudaman Singh. Ripudaman had joined the Imperial Legislative Council while still the heir-apparent (tikka) and became influenced by nationalists such as Pherozeshah Mehta and Dadabhai Naoroji. Ripudaman carried out social and judicial reforms of the state, with him establishing a Legislative Council at Nabha. Ripudaman Singh was forced to abdicate the throne by the British in favour of his minor son due to his involvement in Indian nationalist and Sikh politics and movements, with him abdicating the throne of Nabha on 8 July 1923, which led to the Jaito Morcha of the Akali movement.

=== Dissolution ===
In the happenings of Indian independence in 1947, Nabha was one of the three Phulkian states that merged to become P.E.P.S.U., which itself was gradually merged into Punjab state in 1956.

== State forces ==
The Nabha State Force consisted of a 500-strong infantry unit, including the Nabha Akal Infantry.

== List of rulers ==
No.	Name (Birth–Death)	Portrait	Reign	Enthronement	Ref.
Sardars
1	Hamir Singh (died 1783)		1763 – 1783	?	
Rajas
2	Jaswant Singh (1775 – 22 May 1840)		1783 – 1840	?	
3	Devinder Singh (5 September 1822 – November 1865)		1840 – 1846	15 October 1840	
4	Bharpur Singh (5 October 1840 – 9 November 1863)		1846 – November 1863	?	
5	Bhagwan Singh (30 November 1842 – 31 May 1871)		1863 – 1871	17 February 1864	
Maharajas
6	Hira Singh (19 December 1843 – 24 December 1911)		1871 – 1911	10 August 1871	
7	Ripudaman Singh (4 March 1883 – 14 December 1942)		1911 – 1923	24 January 1912	
8	Pratap Singh (21 September 1919 – 24 July 1995)		1923 – 1948		
Titular
8	Pratap Singh (21 September 1919 – 24 July 1995)		1948 – 1995		
9	Hanuwant Singh (5 December 1948 – 30 June 2017)		1995 – 2017	24 July 1995	
10	Yudhister Singh (5 December 1972 – present)		2017 – present	30 June 2017	

== Administration ==
In 1901, the state had an area of 966 square miles and included 4 towns and 492 villages. Administratively, the state was divided into the following three districts:

1901 State Administration
No	District/Nizāmat	Remark	Pop.	area	Vill.	To.	Today
I	Phul Nizāmat	5 enclaves	37.4%	394	228	1	Punjab
II	Amloh Nizāmat	2+ enclaves	38.6%	291	96	2	Punjab
III	Bawal Nizāmat	Gained in 1858; 3 southern enclaves	24%	281	164	1	Haryana

== Demographics ==
Religious groups in Nabha State (British Punjab province era)
Religious group	1881		1891		1901		1911		1921		1931		1941	
Religious group	Pop.	%	Pop.	%	Pop.	%	Pop.	%	Pop.	%	Pop.	%	Pop.	%
Hinduism (Note: 1931-1941: Including Ad-Dharmis)	133,571	51.02%	164,905	58.32%	160,553	53.89%	126,414	50.79%	133,870	50.84%	132,354	46.02%	146,518	43.09%
Sikhism	77,682	29.67%	63,047	22.3%	78,361	26.3%	76,198	30.62%	78,389	29.77%	97,452	33.89%	122,451	36.01%
Islam	50,178	19.16%	54,397	19.24%	58,550	19.65%	46,032	18.5%	50,756	19.27%	57,393	19.96%	70,373	20.7%
Jainism	375	0.14%	397	0.14%	476	0.16%	238	0.1%	278	0.11%	309	0.11%	480	0.14%
Christianity	18	0.01%	10	0%	7	0%	5	0%	41	0.02%	66	0.02%	221	0.06%
Zoroastrianism	0	0%	0	0%	2	0%	0	0%	0	0%	0	0%	0	0%
Buddhism	0	0%	0	0%	0	0%	0	0%	0	0%	0	0%	0	0%
Judaism	—N/a	—N/a	0	0%	0	0%	0	0%	0	0%	0	0%	0	0%
Others	0	0%	0	0%	0	0%	0	0%	0	0%	0	0%	1	0%
Total population	261,824	100%	282,756	100%	297,949	100%	248,887	100%	263,334	100%	287,574	100%	340,044	100%
Note: British Punjab province era district borders are not an exact match in the present-day due to various bifurcations to district borders — which since created new districts — throughout the historic Punjab Province region during the post-independence era that have taken into account population increases.

== Gallery ==
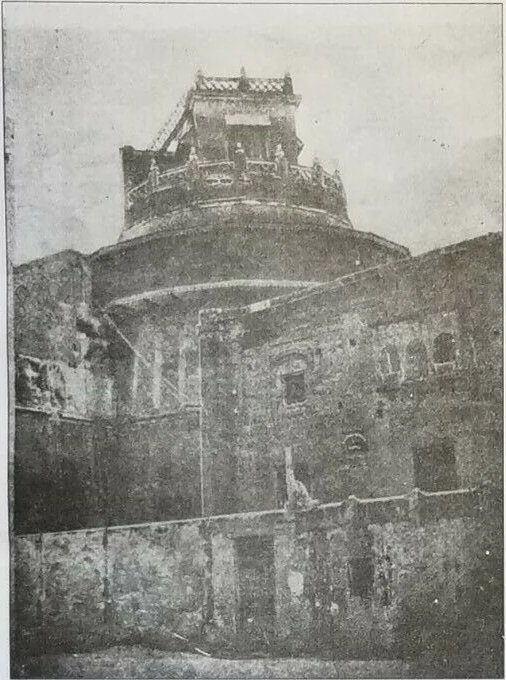
Photograph of Gurdwara Siropa Sahib in Nabha state, where historical Sikh relics and artefacts were kept for safe-keeping, published in Mahan Kosh (1930), c.1920s.

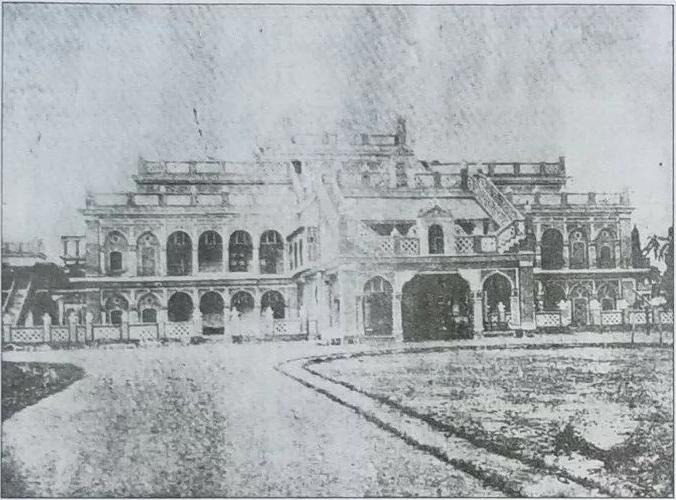
Photograph of the Hira Mahal building in Nabha state, published in Mahan Kosh (1930), c.1920s.

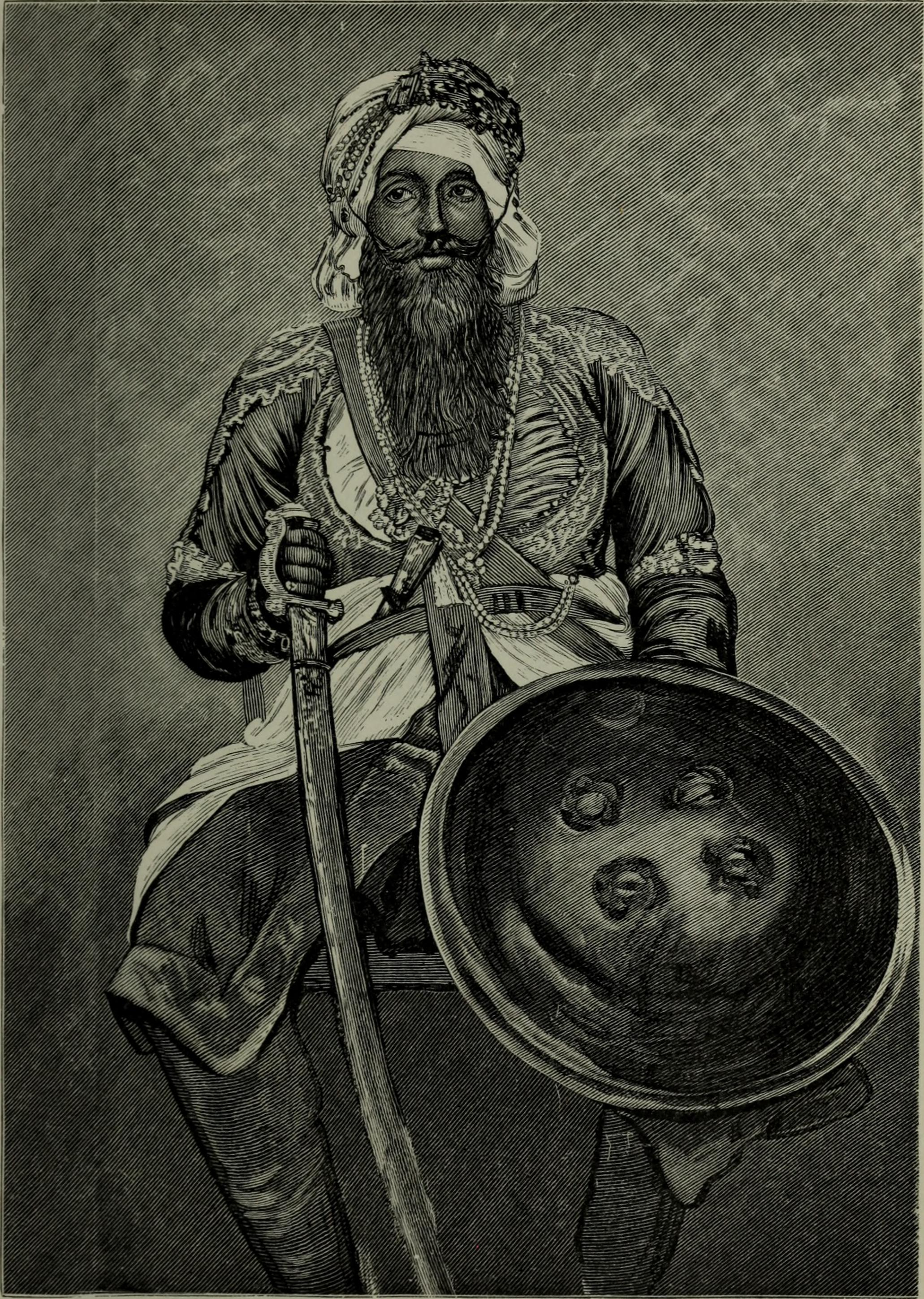
Sir Hira Singh, Raja of Nabha

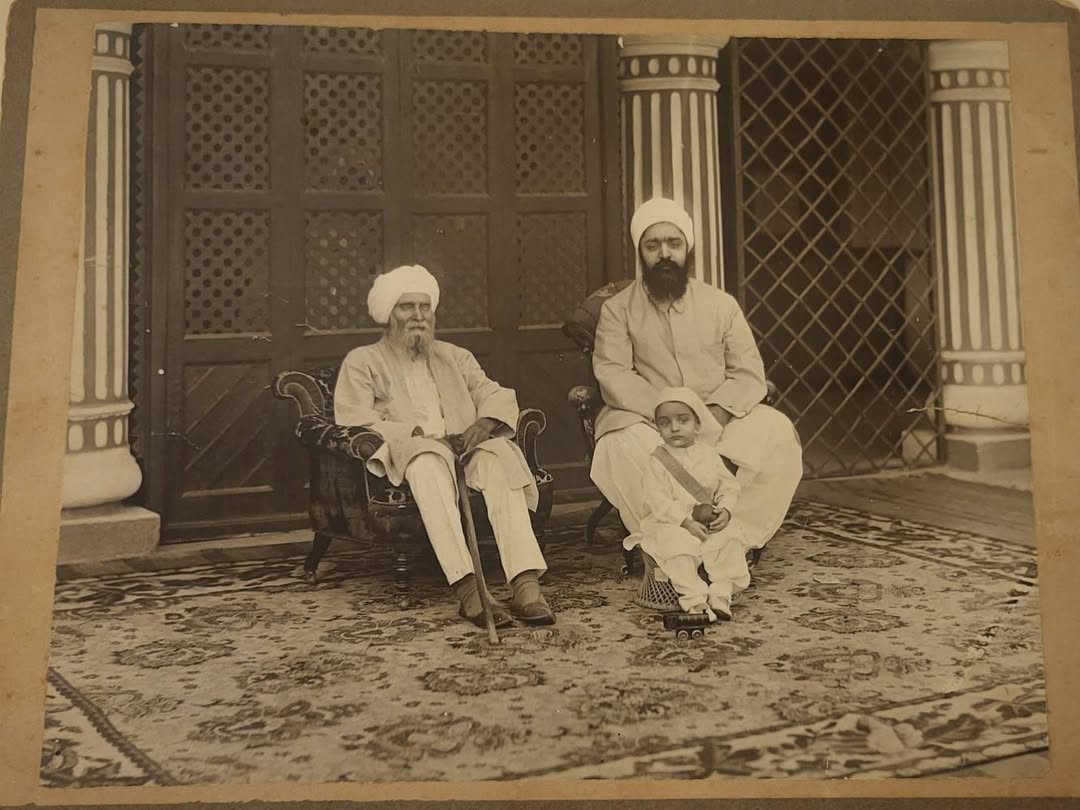
Photograph of Giani Gian Singh with Maharaja Ripudaman Singh of Nabha State and the child Pratap Singh of Nabha State, ca.1920–21

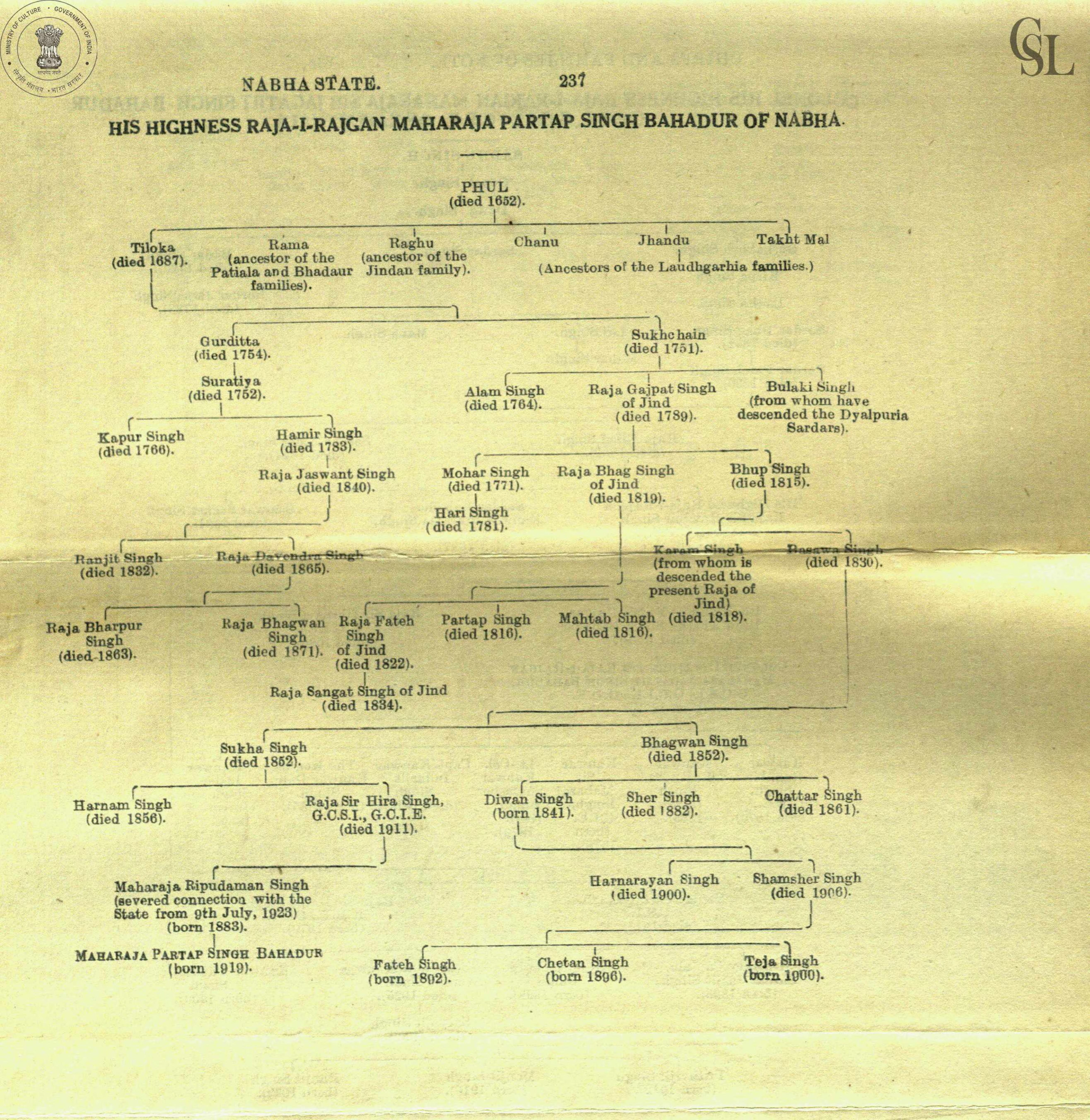
Genealogical pedigree (family-tree) of the ruling family of Nabha State, Punjab, revised pedigree-table (1940)

== See also ==
- Patiala and East Punjab States Union
- Political integration of India
- Phulkian sardars
- Patiala State
- Jind State
- Faridkot State
- Malaudh
- Bhadaur
- Kaithal State
- Cis-Sutlej states
