= Khatipura (Jaipur)–Darbhanga Amrit Bharat Express =

Amrit Bharat Express train route in India

Khatipura (Jaipur) – Darbhanga Amrit Bharat Express

Overview
- Service type: Amrit Bharat Express, Superfast
- Status: Active
- Locale: Rajasthan, Uttar Pradesh and Bihar
- First service: 21 June 2026; 2 months ago (Inaugural); 22 June 2026; 2 months ago (Commercial)
- Current operator: North Western Railways (NWR)

Route
- Termini: Khatipura (KWP); Darbhanga Junction (DBG)
- Stops: 25
- Distance travelled: 1,265 km (786 mi)
- Average journey time: 26 hrs 25 mins
- Service frequency: 6 days
- Train number: 19725/19726
- Lines used: Khatipura–Dausa–Bandikui line; Bharatpur–Idgah Agra line; Idgah Agra–Tundla–Kanpur Central line; Kanpur Central–Gorakhpur line; Gorakhpur–Kaptanganj–Narkatiaganj line; Raxaul–Sitamarhi line; Sitamarhi–Darbhanga line

On-board services
- Classes: Sleeper class coach (SL); General unreserved coach (GS)
- Seating arrangements: Yes
- Sleeping arrangements: Yes
- Auto-rack arrangements: Upper
- Catering facilities: No
- Observation facilities: Saffron-grey
- Entertainment facilities: Electric outlets; Reading lights; Bottle holder
- Other facilities: CCTV cameras; Bio-vacuum toilets; Foot-operated water taps; Passenger information system

Technical
- Rolling stock: Modified LHB coaches
- Track gauge: Indian gauge
- Electrification: 25 kV 50 Hz AC overhead line
- Operating speed: 44 km (27 mi) (Avg.)
- Track owner: Indian Railways
- Rake maintenance: Khatipura (KWP)
- Rake sharing: No

The 19725/19726 Khatipura (Jaipur)–Darbhanga Amrit Bharat Express is India's 35th Non-AC Superfast Amrit Bharat Express train, which runs across the states of Rajasthan, Uttar Pradesh and Bihar by connecting Khatipura of Jaipur, the Pink City of Rajasthan with Darbhanga Junction of Darbhanga, the cultural capital of Mithila in Bihar.

The express train is inaugurated on 2026 by Honorable Prime Minister Narendra Modi through video conference.

== Overview ==
The train is operated by Indian Railways, connecting Khatipura and Darbhanga Junction. It is currently operated 19725/19726 on 6 day basis.

== Rakes ==
It is the 35th Amrit Bharat 2.0 Express train in which the locomotives were designed by Chittaranjan Locomotive Works (CLW) at Chittaranjan, West Bengal and the coaches were designed and manufactured by the Integral Coach Factory at Perambur, Chennai under the Make in India Initiative.

== Schedule ==
Train Schedule: Khatipura ↔ Darbhanga Amrit Bharat Express
Train No.	Station Code	Departure Station	Departure Time	Departure Day	Arrival Station	Arrival Hours
19725	KWP	Khatipura	10:30 PM	Darbhanga Junction	12:55 AM	26h 25m
19726	DBG	Darbhanga Junction	04:30 AM	Khatipura	08:40 AM	28h 10m

== Routes and halts ==
The important halts of the train are :

- Khatipura
- Dausa Junction
- Bandikui Junction
- Mandawar Mahwa Road
- Bharatpur Junction
- Idgah
- Tundla Junction
- Etawah Junction
- Kanpur Central
- Unnao Junction
- Aishbagh Junction
- Gomti Nagar
- Barabanki Junction
- Gonda Junction
- Gorakhpur Junction
- Kaptanganj Junction
- Bagaha
- Narkatiaganj Junction
- Sikta
- Raxaul Junction
- Bairgania
- Sitamarhi Junction
- Janakpur Road
- Kamtaul
- Darbhanga Junction

== Rake reversal or rake share ==
Rake reversal or rake share.

== See also ==
- Amrit Bharat Express
- Vande Bharat Sleeper Express
- Vande Bharat Express
- Uday Express
- Humsafar Express

== Notes ==
a. Runs 6 days in a week with both directions.
