= Maratha Conquest of Gwalior and Gohad =

1783-4 military conflict in India

Conquest of Gwalior and Gohad
- Part of Maratha Resurrection
Date	1783–1784 A.D
Location	Gwalior, Madhya Pradesh
Result	Maratha victory
Territorial changes	Annexation of Gohad and Gwalior Fort into Maratha Confederacy

Belligerents
Maratha Confederacy	Kingdom of Gohad

Commanders and leaders
Mahadaji Scindia; Rane Khan; Ambaji Ingale	Rana Chatrajit (POW)

The Maratha conquest of Gwalior and Gohad is the military conflict between Maratha Confederacy and Kingdom of Gohad. Marathas led by Mahadaji Shinde besieges the fort of Gwalior which falls, after 5 months Gohad also falls to Marathas the Jat Raja was captured while his queens and other ladies committed Jauhar in the fort.

== Siege of Gwalior ==
In 1783, Gwalior Fort, an impenetrable fortress, was under the control of Maharana Chatra Singh Jat, the Rana of Gohad; hence Mahadaji Shinde was able to build upon an initial plan for the capture of the fort. Moving increasingly closer to Gwalior, he fortified his position with a division at Bawanburji and took over the township from the rulers of Gohad. On 18 February 1783, he laid siege to Gwalior Fort; this would last for a period of almost 5 months. With the siege going on for some years, Mahadji had captured it from Rana Chatra Singh on 21 July 1783, and thereafter put it into the hands of Khanderao Haribhalerao to administer.

== Siege of Gohad ==
Gohad was now in the spotlight of Mahadaji Scindia after securing victory in Gwalior. To counter the advances of Mahadaji, the Rana of Gohad applied to the British for help. But while he is doing that, the Anglo-Maratha Wars has just come to an end, and these currents have filed their opposition in the minds of the British against engaging in further warfare with the Marathas. Maharana Chhatra singh, the ruler of Gohad, had been besieged by Mahadaji Scindia, when he had the supply lines of the fortress cut off from the outside world. On 23 February 1784, he succeeded in capturing the Gohad fort. Maharana Chhatra Singh fought and fled but was apprehended by Mahadaji Scindia and imprisoned in Gwalior.

== Aftermath ==
English people looked for Mahadaji's intervention on behalf of the Rana of Gohad, but with limited success. Seeing his defeat as unavoidable, Maharani performed Jauhar on 27 February 1783, leading to Maratha control of the fort. The place is still known as Jauhar Kund within Gwalior Fort.

He further consolidated his dominance by swiftly conquering Gwalior and Gohad. Once he had acquired these territories, he then turned his attention to political affairs in Delhi.
