= Mohari Junction railway station =

Railway Station in Rajasthan, India

Mohari Junction

General information
- Location: State Highway 43, Khauri Ibrahimpur, Dholpur district, Rajasthan; India
- Coordinates: 26.7009°N 77.5541°E
- Elevation: 206 metres (676 ft)
- System: Regional rail station
- Owner: Indian Railways
- Operator: Agra railway division
- Platforms: 1
- Tracks: 2
- Connections: Auto stand

Construction
- Structure type: Standard (on ground station)
- Parking: No
- Cycle facilities: No

Other information
- Status: Functioning
- Station code: MHF
- Fare zone: North Central Railway

History
- Opened: February 1908; 118 years ago
Location

Mohari Junction railway station is a small railway station in Dholpur district, Rajasthan.

== Administration ==
The station code is MHF. It serves Khauri Ibrahimpur village and comes under the administrative limit of Agra railway division of North Central Railway zone.

== Structure ==
The station consists of one platform, which is not well sheltered. It lacks many facilities including water and sanitation.

== Location ==
Mohari Junction is a small railway station having one platform and situated about 0.5 km from the State Highway 43. It is at an elevation of 206 metres (676 ft).

Mohari railway station was part of Dholpur Railway metre-gauge line which was owned by Maharaja Rana of Dholpur State and opened in February 1908.

The railway line starts at Dholpur city and after Mohari Junction, it bifurcates in two, one towards Tantpur town and the other towards Sarmathura.

== See also ==
- Dholpur–Sarmathura Railway
