= Udhana-Palsana Industrial Corridor =

The Udhna-Palsana Industrial Corridor in the Indian state of Gujarat is a region with more than 1000 industries producing metals, textiles, pharmaceuticals, plastics and chemicals. The region is a 32 km long belt which is one of the busiest industrial zones in Asia. The corridor starts near UM road in Udhna and ends in Palsana, both near Surat. The GIDC industrial parks in this belt are in Udhna, Khatodara, Pandesara, Vadod, Sachin, Bhestan, Hojiwala INA, Unn and Palsana.

There is a project being planned by the state government to start Bus Rapid Transit System (BRTS) services on this route to enhance the viability of this belt compared to nearby townships. The BRTS will start at Udhna Darwaja (Gate) and end at Sachin in the first phase and in the second phase go from Sachin to Palsana. Thus the commute on this industrial belt will be cut by an hour.

Udhna is the primary center of this industrial belt and thus it will be connected rapidly with the other nearby regions by BRTS as per governmental plans. Although the conversion to CC road and upgradation to six-lane of Udhna-Sachin road is finished but it lacks rapid public transport.

The Surat Metro will pass through this belt which will be a boon for this congested area and cut one's commute from one hour to 15 minutes. The belt will be upgraded to international standards as per the plans of the State government and the Surat Municipal Corporation. This belt will also have good connectivity with the New Surat International Airport and the ports of Magdalla and Hazira.

The full-fledged completion of this belt is expected by 2012.

== See also ==
- Industrial Corridors of India
