= Bhagwant Singh =

Maharaj-Rana of Dholpur (1835-1873)

- Saramad-i-Rajah-i-Hind

Maharaj-Rana of Dholpur
- Reign: 1836 – 1873
- Coronation: 13 November 1835
- Predecessor: Pohap Singh
- Successor: Nihal Singh
- Born: 1823; Dholpur
- Died: 7 February 1873 (aged 49–50); Dholpur
- Spouses: Rajauria Maharani Sahiba; Gajra; Basant Kaur
- Issue: Kulendra Singh; Khawaja Muhammad Khan
Names
- Rais-ud-Daula Sipahdar-ul-Mulk Saramad-i-Rajah-i-Hind Maharajadhiraj Sri Sawai Maharaj-Rana Sir Bhagwant Singh Lokendra Bahadur Diler Jang Jai Deo
- House: Bamraulia Dynasty
- Father: Kirat Singh
- Religion: Hinduism

Bhagwant Singh (also spelled Bhagwat Singh) (1823 – 7 February 1873) was the Maharaj-Rana of Dholpur princely state from 1836 until his death in 1873.

== Biography ==
The son of Kirat Singh, Singh succeeded his brother, Pohap Singh, as the Maharaj-Rana of Dholpur in 1836. During the Indian Rebellion of 1857, he demonstrated loyal attachment to the East India Company. He rendered assistance to the fugitives from Gwalior in 1857. For his valuable service, he received the insignia of KCSI and was later made GCSI in 1869.

In 1860, Scindia consented to the construction of a bridge over the Chambal, facilitated by the British Government, as part of the trunk road development on the river's right bank. Maharaj-Rana also agreed to this arrangement, with the understanding that the construction costs would be shared equally between the two states, they would equally benefit from the net profits, and in case of the bridge's failure, the ferry at Raj ghat would return to Dholpur, while Scindia would retain the ferry at Khantri.

In 1862, he was guaranteed the right of adoption.

He married Rajauria Maharani Sahiba, the daughter of the Rao of Rajaunia, a scion of the Karauli family and a leading figure in Dholpur. They had a son, Kulendra Singh, who died in 1873. He further married a Muslim lady Gajra the daughter of Syed Mohammad, a courtier in his durbar, and with her, he had an issue: a son named Nawab Khwaja Muhammad Khan. Singh also married Basant Kaur, the daughter of Maharaja Narinder Singh of Patiala.

== Gajra ka Maqbara ==
The significant project of his era was Gajra ka Maqbara, a mausoleum in Dholpur designed for his beloved Gajra a Muslim lady whom he married. It was modeled after the famous Taj Mahal of Agra. However, he did not live to see its completion.

== Death ==
He died on 9 February 1873 and was succeeded by his grandson Nihal Singh as the Maharaj-Rana.

== Honours ==
- United Kingdom 2 June 1869: Knight Grand Commander of the Order of the Star of India

Bhagwant Singh Bamraulia Dynasty Born: 1823 Died: 7 February 1873
Regnal titles
Preceded by Kirat Singh	Maharaj-Rana of Dholpur; 1835 – 1873	Succeeded by Nihal Singh
