= Ram Singh of Dholpur =

Maharaj-Rana of Dholpur from 1901 until his death in 1911

Ram Singh
- Sawai Maharaj-Rana

Maharaj-Rana of Dholpur
- Reign: 1901-1911
- Coronation: 20 July 1901
- Investiture: 2 March 1905
- Predecessor: Nihal Singh
- Successor: Udai Bhan Singh
- Born: 26 May 1883
- Died: 29 March 1911 (aged 27)
- Spouse: Ripudaman Devi
- House: Bamraulia Dynasty
- Father: Nihal Singh
- Mother: Harbans Kaur
- Religion: Hinduism
- Education: Mayo College; Imperial Cadet Corps
- Military career
- Allegiance: United Kingdom
- Branch: British Army
- Rank: Captain

Sir Ram Singh KCIE (Hindi: राम सिंह; Urdu: رام سنگھ; 26 May 1883 – 29 March 1911) was the Maharaj-Rana from 1901 until his death in 1911 of Dholpur princely state, located in present-day Dholpur district of Rajasthan, India.

== Early life and education ==
He was born on 26 May 1883 to Nihal Singh. He received his early education under K. Deighton, then Principal of the Agra College, and later under Herbert Cunningham Clogstoun, who subsequently became Superintendent of the Dholpur State. He received his education at Mayo College, Ajmer, and later underwent training at the Imperial Cadet Corps in Dehradun.

== Family ==
In June 1905, he married Ripudaman Devi, the daughter of Sir Hira Singh, the Maharaja of Nabha.

== Reign ==
Ram Singh succeeded his father, Nihal Singh, as the Maharaj-Rana of Dholpur, following his death on 20 July 1901. He succeeded his father as minor. Initially, the administration of the state was carried out by Clogstoun, Superintendent of the Dholpur State, assisted by selected officials, under the direction of the Political Agent. He was invested with full ruling powers on 2 March 1905. He attended the Delhi Durbar of 1903 and, along with other chiefs, formed an escort to the Viceroy and Governor-General of India.

In 1905, the Secretary of State sanctioned the construction of a light railway Dholpur–Sarmathura Railway, originally named Dholpur-Bari, with a gauge of 2 ft 6 in. It was opened on 24 February 1908.

He left the state debt-free, with stable finances, and its government departments well-organized.

== Freemason ==
He was initiated as a Freemason at Dholpur on the night of 22 December 1910, when Colonel Foreman and some other Freemasons were invited.

== Death ==
Ram Singh died young. He had been in poor health since July 1910 but accompanied his younger brother, Udai Bhan Singh, on 19 October 1910, to Mumbai to receive Shahzada Basdev Singh of Pandriganeshpur, a grandson of Maharaja Sher Singh, who was returning from England. After a week's stay in Mumbai, he returned to Dholpur on 26 October 1910. On 8 November 1910, he traveled to Agra by motor to bid farewell to Lord Minto during his stay there. On 7 January 1911, he went to Talab-e-Shahi to shoot ducks and returned on 10 January 1911. His condition became serious on 24 March 1911. Despite receiving medical treatment, he died on the night of 29 March 1911, at 11:15 p.m. without leaving a son and was succeeded by his younger brother, Udai Bhan Singh.

== Titles, honours & ranks ==
=== Titles and styles ===
Captain His Highness Rais-ud-Daula Sipahdar-ul-Mulk Saramad Rajah-i-Hind Maharajadhiraj Sri Sawai Maharaj Rana Ram Singh Lokindra Bahadur Diler Jang Jai Deo, KCIE, Maharaja-Rana of Dholpur

=== Honours ===
- British Raj:
  - 1903: Delhi Durbar Gold Medal
- United Kingdom:
  - 1909:Knight Commander of the Order of the Indian Empire

=== Military ranks ===
He held the honorary rank of Captain in the British Army.

Ram Singh of Dholpur Bamraulia Dynasty Born: 26 May 1883 Died: 29 March 1911
Regnal titles
Preceded by Nihal Singh	Maharaj Rana of Dholpur; 1901-1911	Succeeded by Udai Bhan Singh
