= Nihal Singh =

Maharaj-Rana of Dholpur from 1873 until his death in 1901

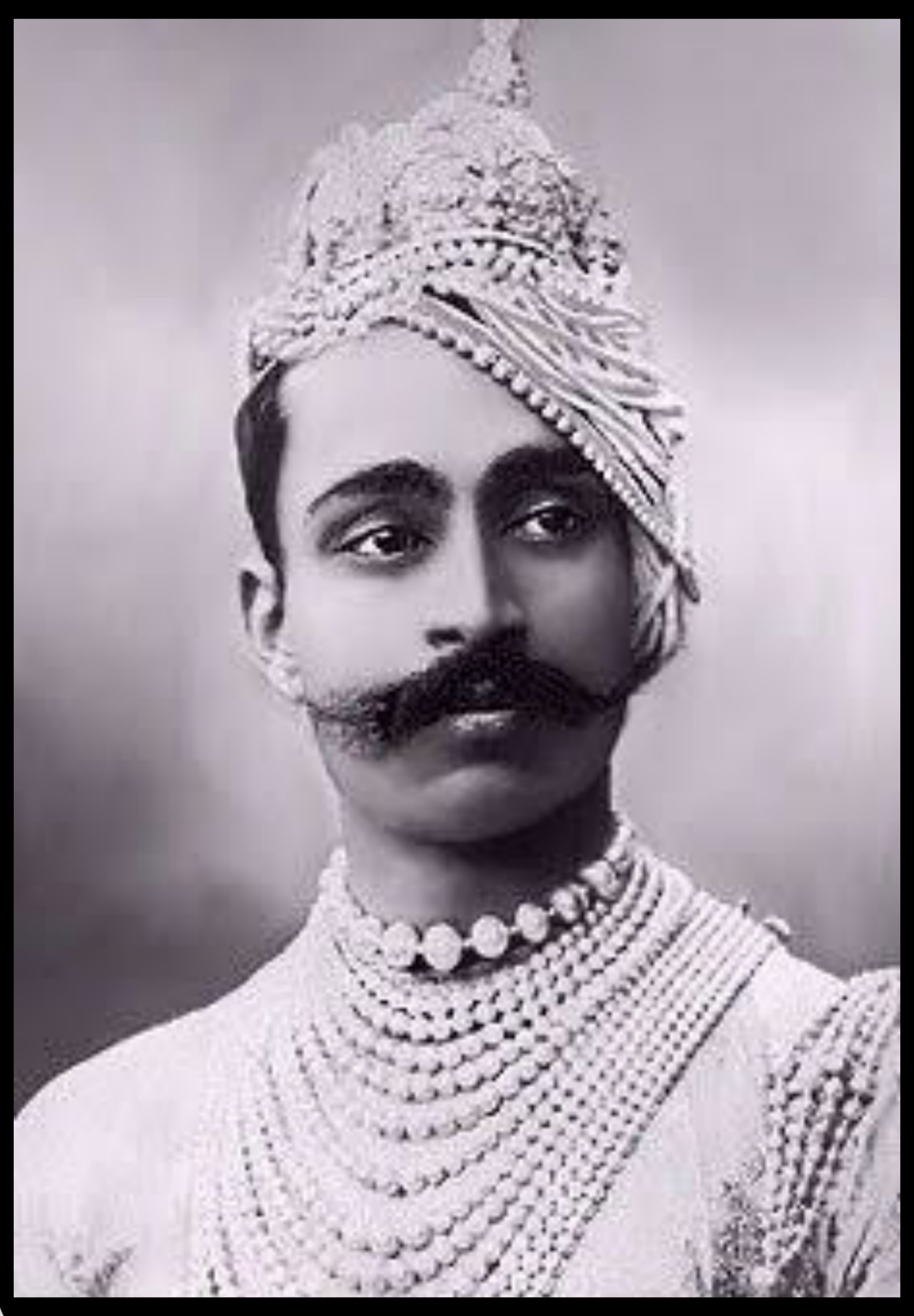

Maharaj-Rana of Dholpur
- Reign: 1873–1901
- Coronation: 9 February 1873
- Investiture: 19 February 1883
- Predecessor: Bhagwant Singh
- Successor: Ram Singh
- Regents: Dinkar Rao; Thomas Dennehy
- Born: 4 May 1863
- Died: 20 July 1901 (aged 38); Mashobra
- Issue: Ram Singh; Udai Bhan Singh
Names
- Rais-ud-Daula Sipahdar-ul-Mulk Saramad-i-Rajah-i-Hind Maharajadhiraj Sri Sawai Maharaj-Rana Sir Ram Singh Lokendra Bahadur Diler Jang Jai Deo
- House: Bamraulia Dynasty
- Father: Kulendar Singh
- Mother: Basant Kaur
- Religion: Hinduism
- Education: Mayo College; Imperial Cadet Corps
- Military career
- Allegiance: British Raj
- Branch: Central India Horse
- Rank: Major

Nihal Singh CB (4 May 1863 – 20 July 1901) was the Maharaj-Rana of Dholpur princely state from 1873 until his death in 1901.

== Early life ==
Nihal Singh was born on 4 May 1863, to Kulendra Singh, the heir-apparent of Dholpur, who was born in 1863 and died in 1870, and his wife, Basant Kaur, the daughter of Narendra Singh, the Maharaja of Patiala, who died in 1888.

== Marriage ==
He married Harbans Kaur, the second daughter of prince Shahdeo Singh, grandson of Maharaja Ranjit Singh, on 30 April 1879, by whom he had two sons, Ram Singh and Udai Bhan Singh.

== Reign ==
He succeeded his grandfather, Bhagwant Singh, as a minor to the throne on 9 February 1873.

=== Minority ===
Dinkar Rao was appointed as a guardian to oversee the general administration of the state, granting him general powers of control. However, these powers were subject to the overall control of British authorities. Due to his ill health, he resigned shortly thereafter. Subsequently, a British officer was appointed to oversee the political affairs of Dholpur and to manage the education of Maharaj-Rana.

The administration of the state was carried out from 1874 to 1883 by Thomas Dennehy, upon whose departure, a council was replaced by the appointment of a Diwan.

=== Investiture ===
He was invested with full ruling powers by Sir Edward Bradford, the-then Agent to the Governor-General of India for Rajputana, on 19 February 1883.

=== Feud between Dholpur and Gwalior ===
Royal Houses of Gwalior and Dholpur never had friendly relations, and the feud between them was always exploited by the British. However this feud between them was abandoned at a public durbar in 1875. This occurred when Jiwajirao Scindia, the Maharaja of Gwalior, visited Dholpur and embraced Nihal Singh, the Maharaj-Rana.

=== State Bank of Dholpur ===
State Bank of Dholpur was inaugurated on 16 August 1894. Its initial capital was provided by the Maharaj-Rana. It was established to assist impoverished individuals as well as tenants and zamindars who required financial assistance at a low interest rate.

=== Wildlife sanctuary ===
The establishment of the Wildlife Sanctuary in Dholpur traces its origins to the tenure of Thomas Dennehy as the Political Agent in Dholpur during the minority of the Maharaj-Rana. During this period, a place within the Van Vihar Forest was inhabited by seven sadhus for fifty years. These sadhus objected to killing animals in the forest on religious grounds, and it is believed that the idea of the first sanctuary originated thus.

Maharaj-Rana and Herbert Cunningham Clogstoun made further improvements, and another area was designated as a sanctuary after the creation of an artificial lake by building a dam on the Banganga River in 1904.

== Personal life ==
He had an impressive collection of jewels, art, historic items, carriages, polo ponies, and dogs. After his death, most of these possessions had to be sold to settle his personal liabilities. He was an expert horseman, hunter, and pigsticker, and earned many trophies.

== Titles, styles, honours and military ranks ==
=== Titles and styles ===
Major His Highness Rais-ud-Daula Sipahdar-ul-Mulk Saramad-i-Rajah-i-Hind Maharajadhiraj Sri Sawai Maharaj-Rana Sir Nihal Singh Lokendra Bahadur Diler Jang Jai Deo, Maharaj-Rana of Dholpur, CB.

=== Honours ===
- United Kingdom:
  - 1898: Companion of the Order of the Bath
- British India:
  - 1897-8: Frontier Medal in the Tirah campaign

=== Military ranks ===
He was an Honorary Major in the Central India Horse.

== Death ==
He died on 20 July 1901 at Mashobra, and was succeeded by his eldest son, Ram Singh.

Nihal Singh Bamraulia Dynasty Born: 4 May 1863 Died: 20 July 1901
Regnal titles
Preceded by Bhagwant Singh	Maharaj-Rana of Dholpur; 1873-1901	Succeeded by Ram Singh
