= Sumandeep Vidyapeeth =

Private university

- Type: Private
- Established: 2007
- Affiliations: UGC
- Chancellor: Dr. Harshad Shah
- Vice-Chancellor: Dr. Rajesh. P. Bharaney
- President: Dr. Mansukh K. Shah
- Location: Piparia, Waghodia, Vadodara, Gujarat, India; 22.2907962°N 73.3199696°E
- Website: Official website

Sumandeep Vidyapeeth is private, deemed university located in Piparia, Waghodia, Vadodara, Gujarat, India. It is accredited "A++" grade by NAAC.

== Institutes and departments ==
- K. M. Shah Dental College and Hospital
- Shrimati B. K. Shah Medical Institute and Research Centre
- College of Physiotherapy
- Sumandeep Nursing College
- Department of Pharmacy
- Department of Management
- Sumandeep Homoeopathic Medical College and Hospital

== Controversy ==
In 2017, the president Mansukh Shah and two other persons were arrested by the Anti Corruption Bureau (ACB) of Gujarat for allegedly demanding and accepting ₹ 20 lakh to let a medical student appear in examination. In raid, the ACB found documents pertaining to fixed deposits worth ₹ 44.63 crore, four cars collectively worth ₹ 1 crore and 200 bank cheques of ₹ 101 crore from home and offices of Shah.
