= Makhori =

- village
- Location in Madhya Pradesh, India Makhori (India)
- Coordinates: 26°14′22″N 78°34′2″E
- Country: India
- State: Madhya Pradesh

Languages
  - Official: Hindi
- Time zone: UTC+5:30 (IST)

Makhori is a village in Bhind district in Madhya Pradesh. Makhori is located at a distance of 2 km from Guhisar in east direction on Gwalior-Baragaon-Bilara Road.
