= Gohad =

Gohad Gohud
- Municipality
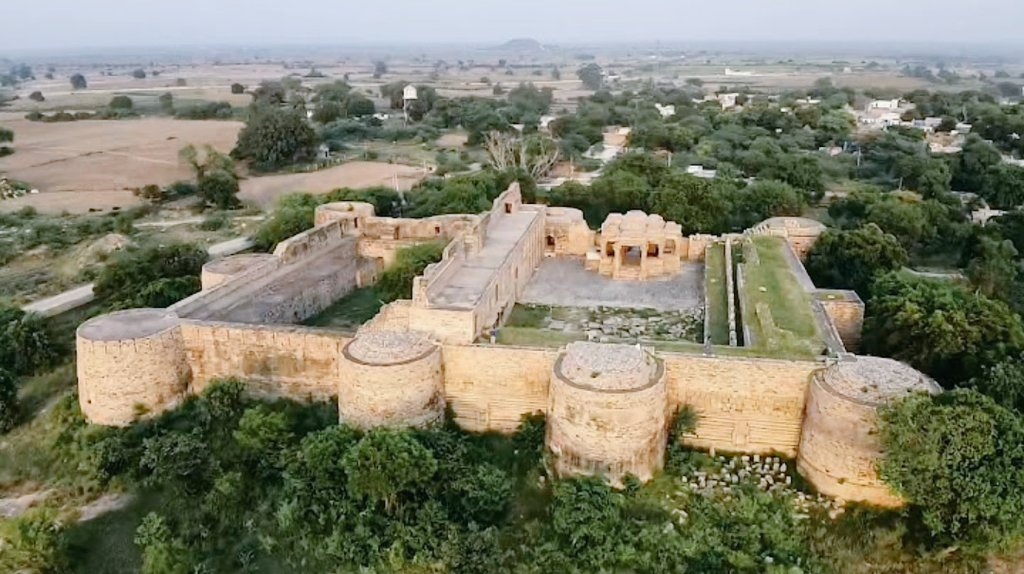
- Gohad Fort

- Location in Madhya Pradesh, India
- Coordinates: 26.43°N 78.44°E
- Country: India
- State: Madhya Pradesh
- District: Bhind
- Elevation: 159 m (522 ft)

Population (2001)
  - Total: 45,194

Languages
  - Official: Hindi
- Time zone: UTC+5:30 (IST)

Gohad is a city and municipality in Bhind district in the Indian state of Madhya Pradesh. A town of historical importance, it is situated close to the city of Gwalior (45 km). The Gohad Fort is located here.

== History ==
The state's formation happened during the Tomar dynasty of Gwalior. The Jats settled the town of Gohad and nearby forts and garhis (fortresses) in 16th century. The most renowned ruler was Maharaja Bhim Singh Rana who established the Jat rule over the trans chambal region and historic Gwalior fort. During his reign, the revenue of the kingdom was 56 lakhs and Bhim Singh Rana had control of 56 mahals or small parganas. The most successful ruler of Gohad, Maharaja Chhatar Singh Rana, also known as Rana Lokendra Singh, repulsed Maratha raids on Gohad and other Jat forts many times, and defeated Peshwa Raghunath Rao.

== Geography ==
Gohad has an average elevation of 159 metres (521 feet). It is drained by the Vaisali River, which is a tributary of Sindh River, and originates from Behat in the Gwalior region. Rural nallahs and Morar river (Kalpi River) are catchments of Vaisali River.

The high standing Gohad Dam supplies Gohad town with drinking water.

== Climate ==
The climate of Gohad is characterized by dryness except during south-west monsoon. It is considered the driest place in Madhya Pradesh.

== Demographics ==
As of 2001 India census, Gohad had a population of 45,194. Males constitute 55% of the population and females 45%. Gohad has an average literacy rate of 57%, lower than the national average of 59.5%: male literacy is 68%, and female literacy is 44%. In Gohad, 17% of the population is under 6 years of age.

== District Demand ==
Gohad is a big tehsil, and the local people keep raising demands to make Godhad the district headquarters, for which a memorandum has been submitted to the Chief Minister. The Malanpur industrial area is located in Gohad. There is a demand to create a new district by combining Gormi, Mau, Porsa and Gohad tehsils.

== Transportation ==
Gohad is well connected by road and rail. Gwalior - Bhind - Etawa road passes through Gohad and daily bus services are available. The Gwalior - Itawa link rail line passes through Gohad via Gohad Road Railway Station.

== See also ==
- Kirat Singh
- Karwas
- Guhisar
- Utila Fort
- Endori
- Gohad State
