= Kundli, Rajasthan =

Kondli
- Village
- Kundli
- Location in Rajasthan, India Kondli (India)
- Coordinates: 26.575809°N 76.649246°E
- Country: India
- State: Rajasthan
- District: Sawai Madhopur
- Tehsil: Bamanwas

Government
  - Type: Rajasthan Government
  - Body: Nagar Parishad, Municipality

Area
  - Total: 0.28 km^{2} (0.11 sq mi)
- Elevation: 276 m (906 ft)

Population (2011)
  - Total: 598
  - Density: 2,100/km^{2} (5,500/sq mi)
- Time zone: UTC+5:30 (IST)
- PIN: 07467
- Telephone code: 07467
- Website: www.villagedata.in/rajasthan/sawai-madhopur/bamanwas/kazi-kundli

Kondli is a village in Post Gandal, Bamanwas Tehsil, in Sawai Madhopur district in the Indian state of Rajasthan.

== Population ==
=== 2011 Census Details ===
The total population is 598, in 132 households. Village literacy rate is 61.5% and the Female Literacy rate is 20.4%.

Heading	Number	Percentage
Total Population	598	100.0
Total No of Houses	132	
Male population	308	51.5
Female population	290	48.5
Child population	75	12.5
Literacy rate	368	61.5
Scheduled Tribes Population	363	60.7
Scheduled Caste Population	179	29.9
Working Population	287	48.0

== Politics ==
The major political parties in this area are LSWP, BJP and INC.

== Notable people ==
Pyarelal Patel Shivraj Meena, IAS Dr Ramraj Meena, Senior DMO Ramavatar Meena, Social Worker Laxmi Meena, Professor

== Transport ==
The village is located 90 km (56 mi) away from Sanganeer Airport and 22 km (14 mi) from Gangapur City railway station.

Near By Tourist Places

Kalakho 51 KM near Karauli 55 KM near Ranthambore 60 KM near Sawai Madhopur 63 KM near Jamwa Ramgarh 86 KM near
