= Dinkar Rao =

Indian court official

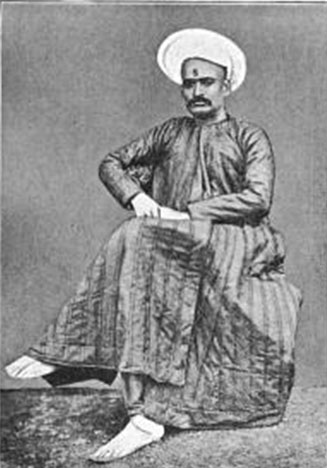
- Sir Dinkar Rao
- Born: 20 December 1819; Devrukh, Ratnagiri District, Bombay Presidency, Company India
- Died: 9 January 1896 (age 76); British India
- Other names: Raja Sir Dinkar Rao Rajwade
- Awards: KCSI

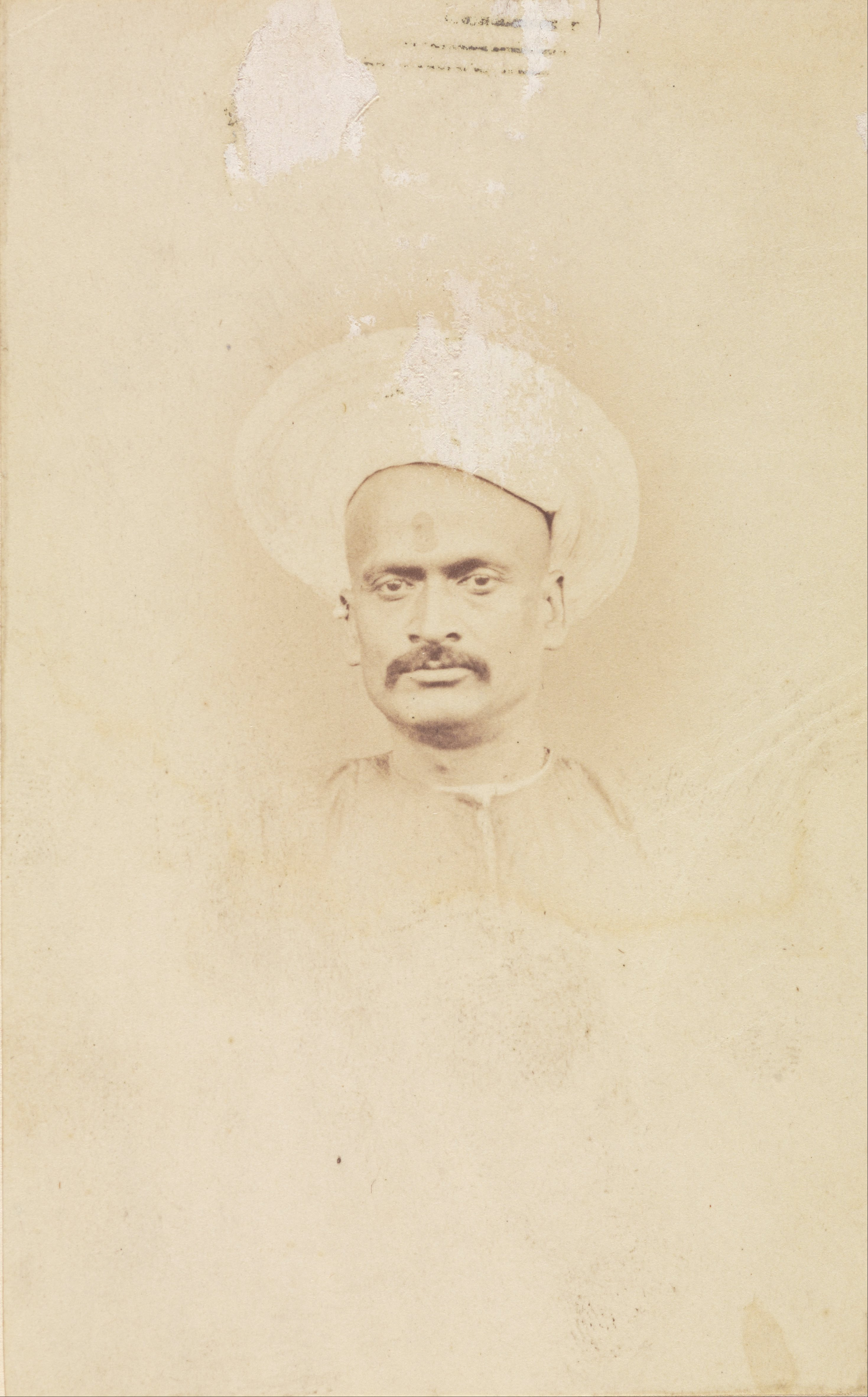
Photograph by Felice Beato, circa 1857

Raja Sir Dinkar Rao Rajwade KCSI (20 December 1819 – 9 January 1896) was an Indian court official, born in Devrukh, Ratnagiri district of Bombay Presidency. He was the son of Raghunath Rao by his first wife. He was a Chitpavan Brahmin.

Dinkar Rao's education in his mother tongue was commenced in about his fifth year under the supervision of his father who was in the service of Maharaja Daulat Rao Scindia. He was also instructed in Sanskrit and Persian. Particular attention appears to have been bestowed on his religious education. He grew up an orthodox Hindu, pious and punctual in the performance of his religious duties. He loved Hindu music and acquired a fair knowledge of Hindu medicine.

At the age of fifteen, he entered into the service of the Gwalior State where his father had served. Rapidly promoted to the responsible charge of a division, he showed such signs of marked ability that his services were specially recognised by his appointment as the Subahdar of Tanwarghar division, in succession to his father. He displayed unusual talents in reorganizing the police and revenue departments, and in reducing chaos to order.

In 1851, Dinkar Rao became Dewan. The events which led to the British victories of Maharajpur and Panniar in 1844 had filled the state with mutinous soldiery, ruined the finances and weakened authority. With a strong hand the dewan suppressed disorder, abolished ruinous imports, executed public works, and by reduction of salaries, including his own, turned a deficit into a surplus. During the period of the Indian Rebellion of 1857 Rao never wavered in loyalty to the British; and although the state troops also mutinied in June 1858 on the approach of Tantya Tope, he adhered to the British cause, retiring with Maharaja Sindhia to the Agra fort. After the restoration of order he continued to serve as Prime Minister until December 1859.

Dinkar Rao left Gwalior in January 1859 and shifted to Allahabad, the capital of the North-Western Provinces. Lord Canning recognising his value as an administrator offered him a seat in the Supreme Council, as the newly constituted Imperial Legislative Council vide the Indian Councils Act 1861 was known. In 1862, he was nominated by Lord Canning, along with Raja Sir Deo Narayan Singh of Benaras and Maharaja of Patiala to the legislative council.

In March 1862, Dinkar Rao published his "Memorandum of observations on the Administration of India." It contains his views on forty-six subjects and it was written for the Viceroy's perusal and consideration.

In 1873, he was appointed guardian to the minor Raja of Dholpur, but soon afterwards he resigned, owing to ill health.

== Service as Commissioner ==
In 1875, the Viceroy of India, Lord Northbrook, selected him as a Commissioner, along with the Maharaja of Gwalior and Jaipur and three British colleagues, to try the Gaekwad of Baroda on a charge of attempting to poison Colonel Robert Phayre, the British Resident.

== Knighthood ==
In May 1866, Dinkar Rao was appointed a Knight Commander of the Order of the Star of India (KCSI), entitling him to be styled "Sir Dinkar Rao." At the Imperial assemblage at Delhi that year, the title of "Raja" was bestowed on him. In 1884, Lord Dufferin made the title hereditary. Lord Dufferin, who took a peculiar interest in Gwalior, was particularly solicitous that Dinkar Rao should be held in due regard by the British Government and recommended him personally to the good offices of the British officials everywhere, and to those of the Native States in which his property lay.

He died on 9 January 1896. No Indian statesmen of the 19th century gained a higher reputation, yet he only commenced the study of English at the age of forty and was never able to converse fluently in it.

His orthodoxy resented social reforms, and he kept aloof from the Indian National Congress.
