= Gangapur City Junction =

Railway Station in Rajasthan, India

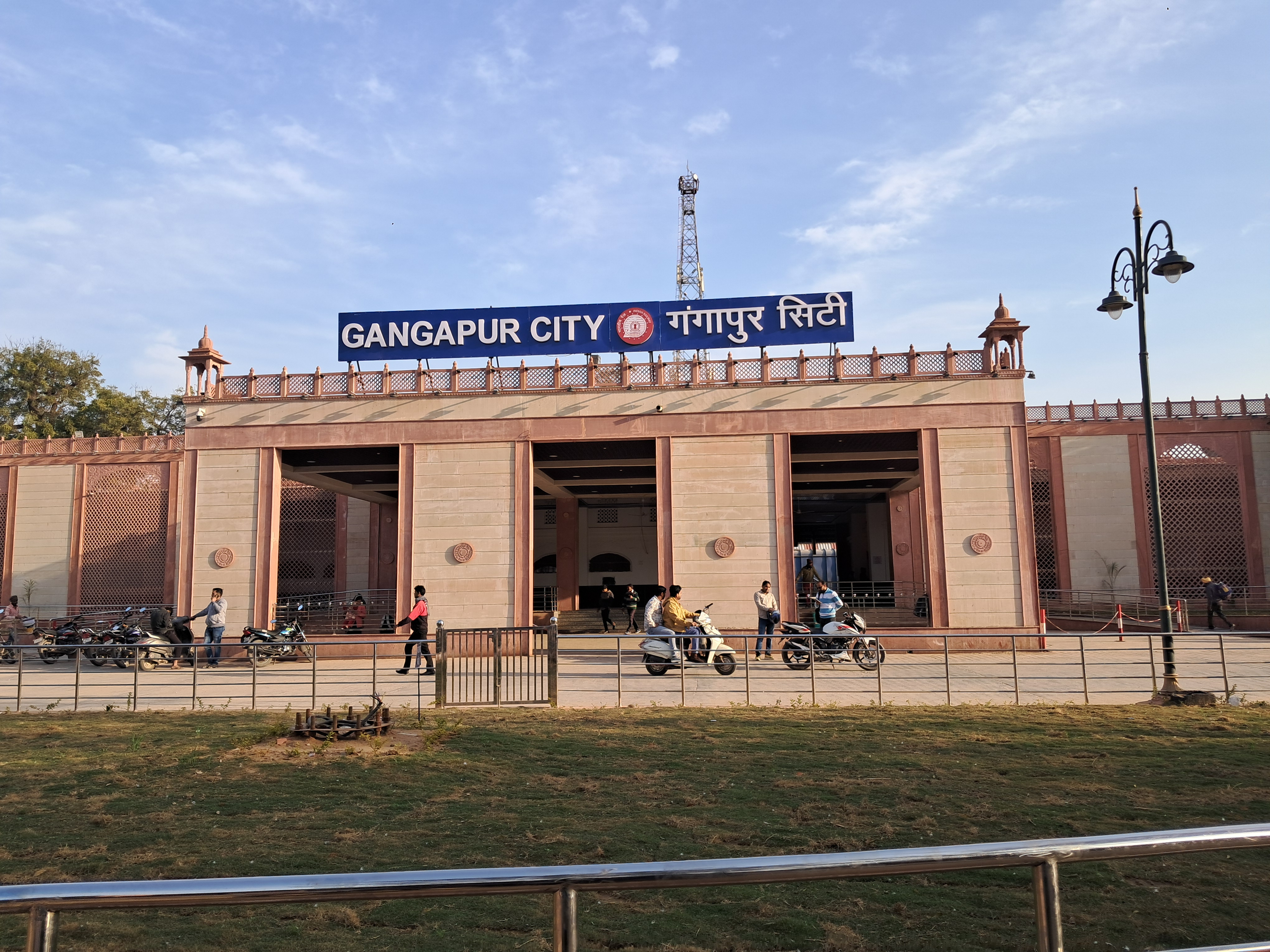

General information
- Location: Gurudwara Circle, Railway Colony, Gangapur City, Rajasthan
- Coordinates: 26.47171°N 76.71594°E
- Elevation: 245.3 metres (805 ft)
- System: Indian Railways Junction station, express train and passenger train station
- Owner: Indian Railways
- Operator: West Central Railway zone
- Lines: New Delhi–Mumbai main line, Jaipur–Gangapur City railway line, Dholpur–Gangapur City railway line, Dausa–Gangapur City railway line, Kota–Rewari railway line
- Platforms: 3
- Tracks: 4 Broad Gauge
- Connections: Auto Rickshaw, Taxi

Construction
- Structure type: Standard on-ground station
- Parking: Yes
- Accessible: Available

Other information
- Status: Active
- Station code: GGC
- Zone(s): West Central Railway zone
- Division(s): Kota

History
- Opened: 1912; 114 years ago
Location
- Location within Rajasthan
- Interactive map

Gangapur City Junction (Station Code: GGC) is an NSG-3 category railway station and an important junction on the New Delhi–Mumbai main line under the Kota Division of West Central Railway (WCR). It is a major crew-changing point and an evolving junction of three trunk routes, serving Gangapur City, Karauli, Dausa and surrounding regions.

== Administration ==
This station falling under Kota railway division of West Central Railway zone has been classified under 'NSG-3' category.

== Gallery ==
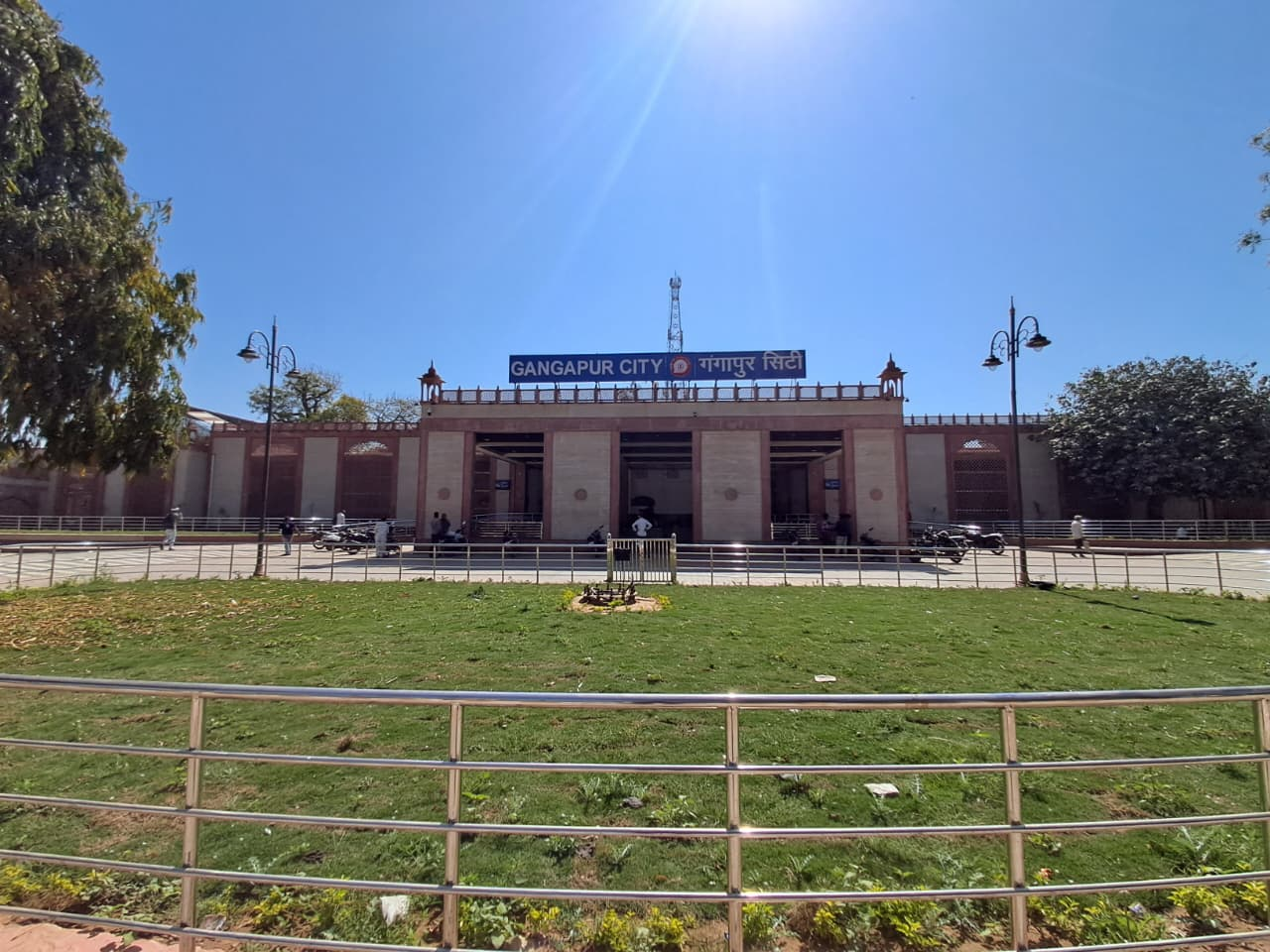

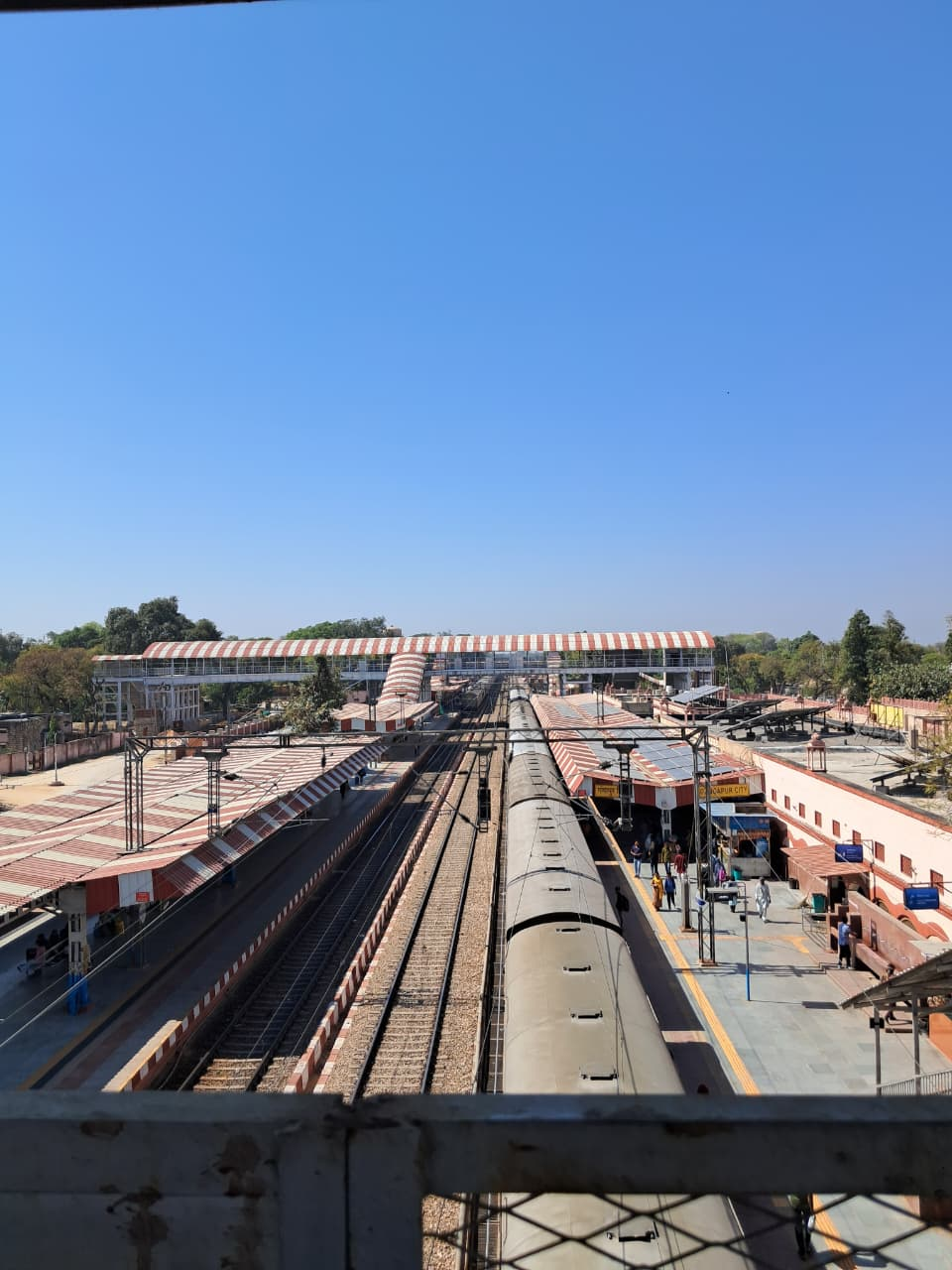

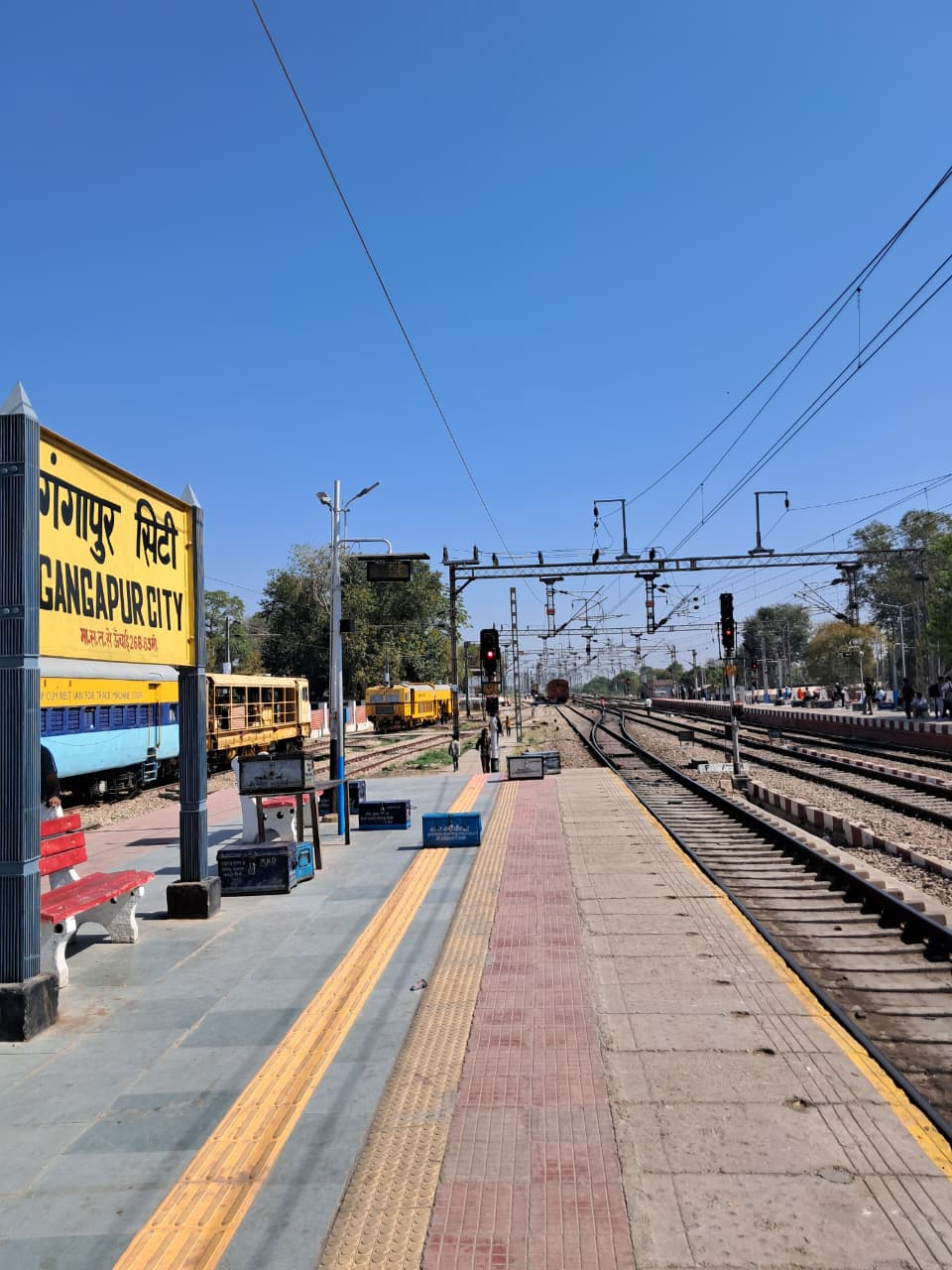

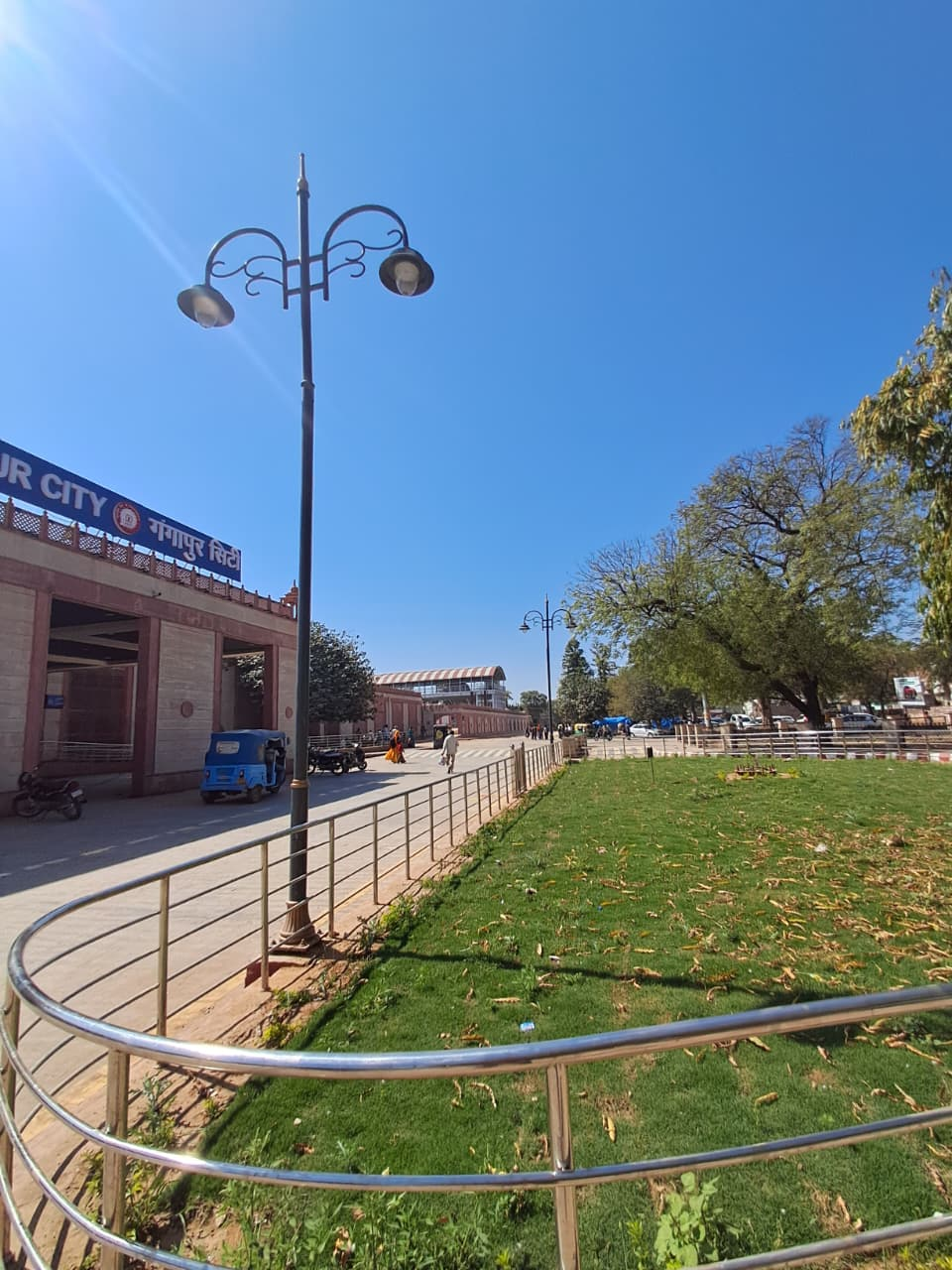

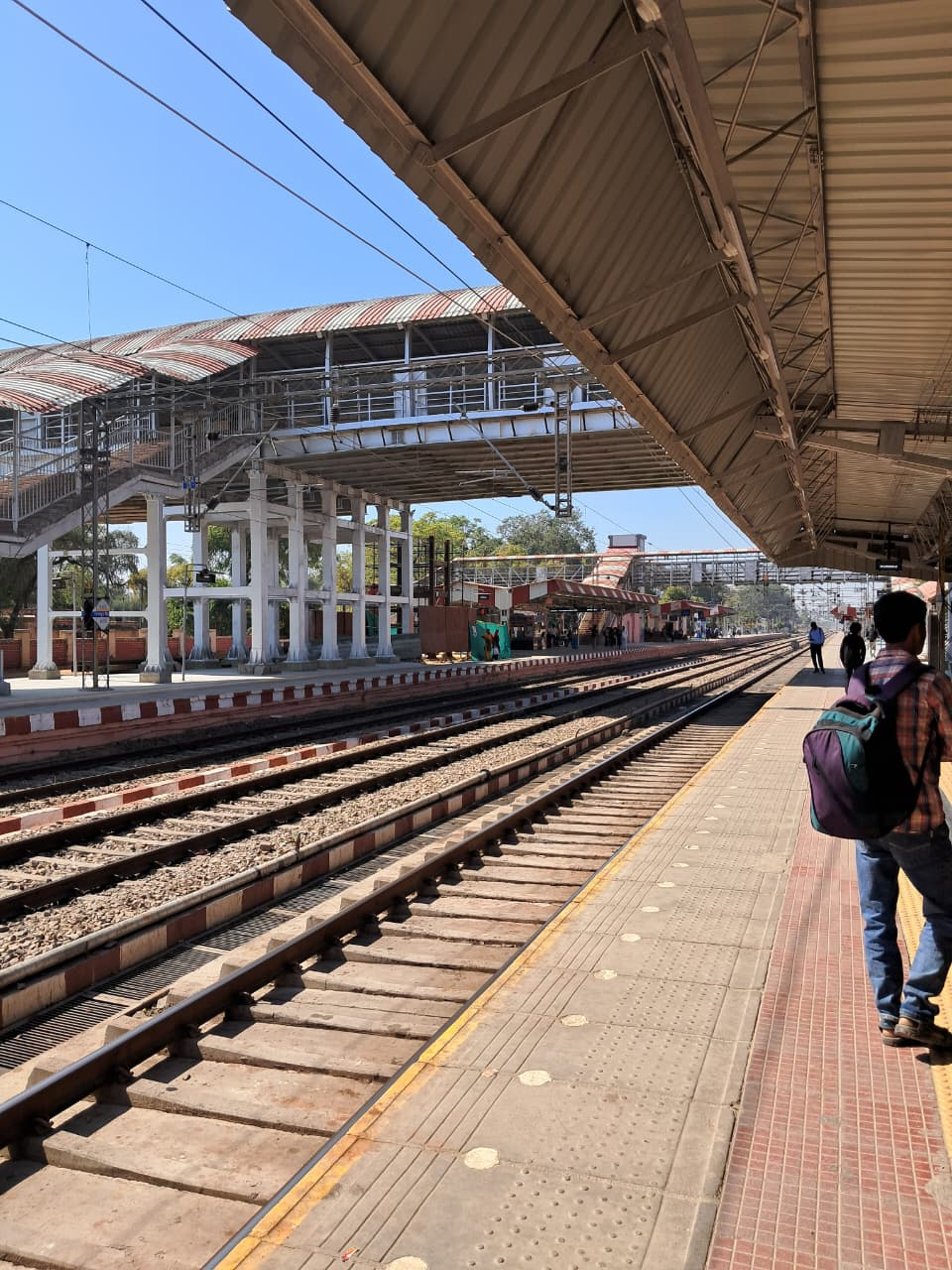

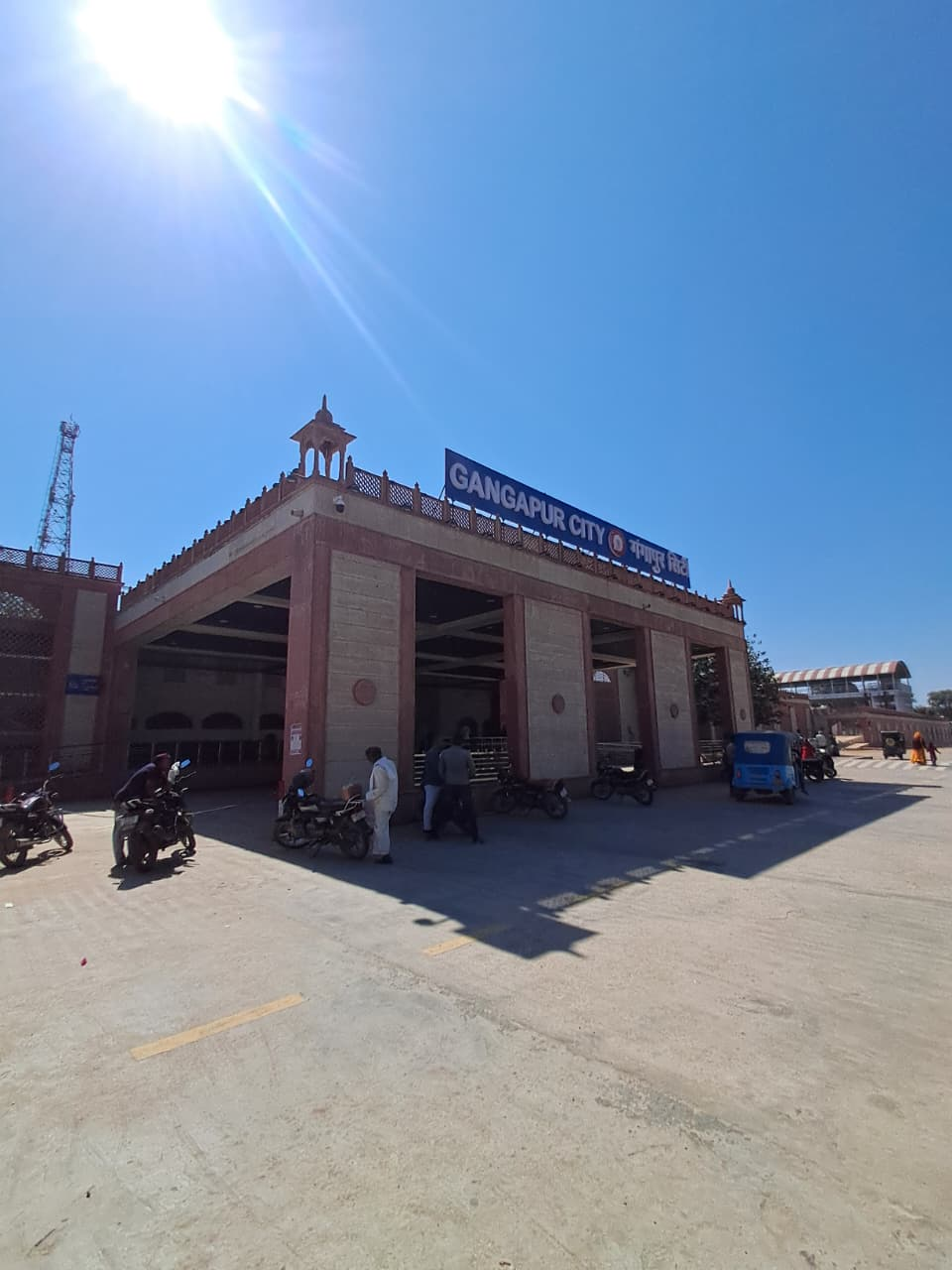

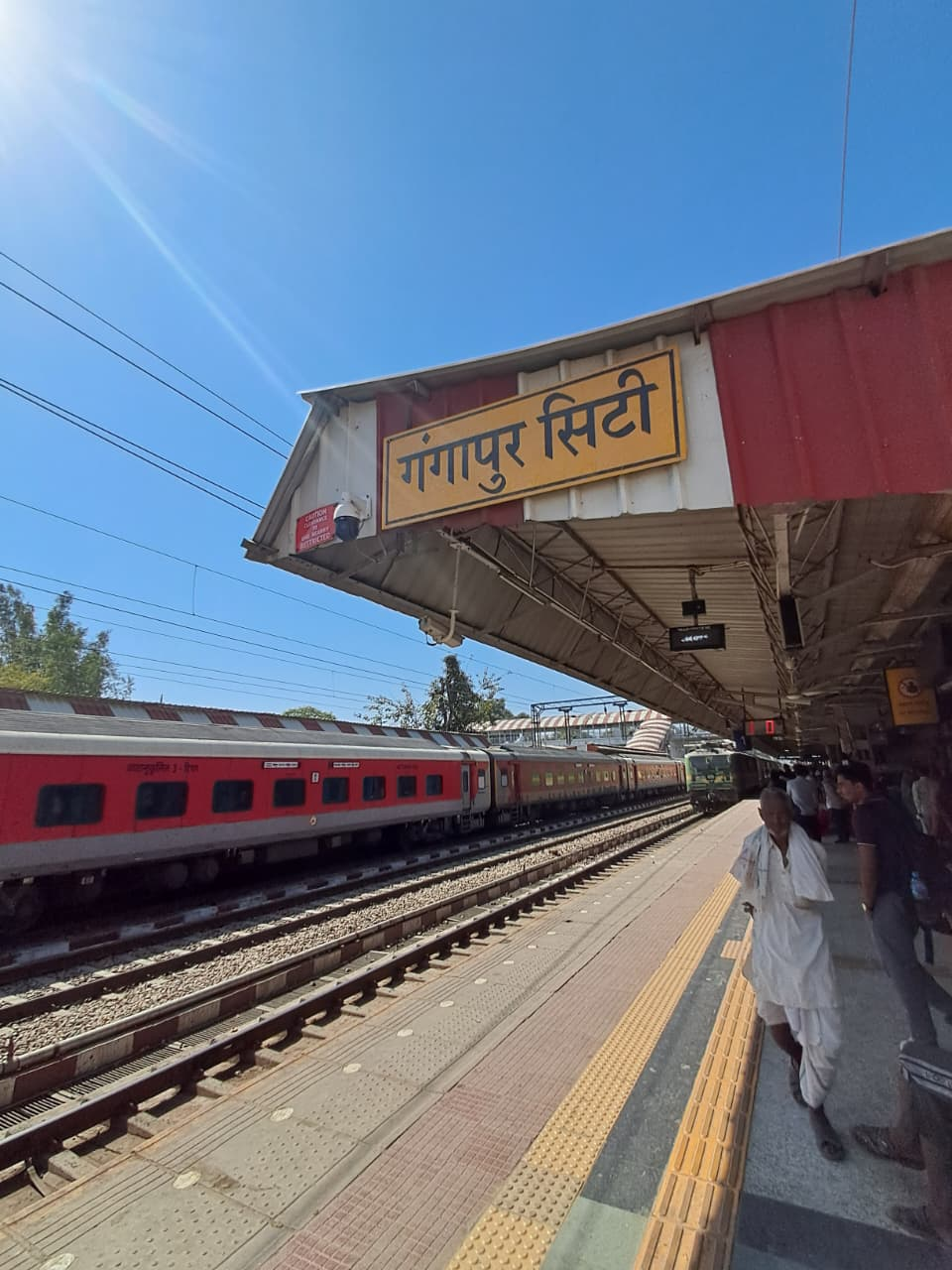
Gangapur City Junction Railway Station

== Further extension ==
Dholpur–Sarmathura–Gangapur City Railway Line is a proposed broad-gauge railway project in the state of Rajasthan, India. The line aims to connect Dholpur, Sarmathura, and Gangapur City to improve regional connectivity between eastern Rajasthan and major trunk routes.

The existing Dholpur–Sarmathura Railway is a 762 mm (2 ft 6 in) narrow-gauge line built during the Dholpur princely state era. Train operations on this narrow-gauge route were discontinued in March 2023.

Indian Railways proposed extending the line from Sarmathura to Gangapur City to improve connectivity toward Karauli, Jhansi, Gwalior and Gangapur City.

== Lines ==
The main lines passing through Gangapur City are:

- Mumbai–New Delhi line via Kota (Electrified Triple Broad-Gauge Line) :- Trunk Route 3 of Indian Railways, runs for 1,389 kilometres (863 mi) from New Delhi to Mumbai via Mathura, Bharatpur, Kota, Nagda, Ratlam, Vadodara, Surat, Valsad, Vapi & Vasai.
- Dausa-Gangapur City line (single broad-gauge line) :- Covering 97 kilometres (60 mi) and currently under electrification, this line connects Gangapur City to Delhi-Ahmedabad line and Dausa to New Delhi-Mumbai main line.

== Important Trains ==
A few Important trains stopping at Gangapur City are:

- Golden Temple Mail
- Parasnath Express
- Nanda Devi Express
- Paschim Express
- Swaraj Express
- Dwarka Express
- Jan Shatabdi Express
- Azimabad Express
- Avadh Express
- Mewar Express
- New Delhi Intercity Express

and so on.
