= Dholpur Junction railway station =

Railway station in Rajasthan, India

Dholpur Junction
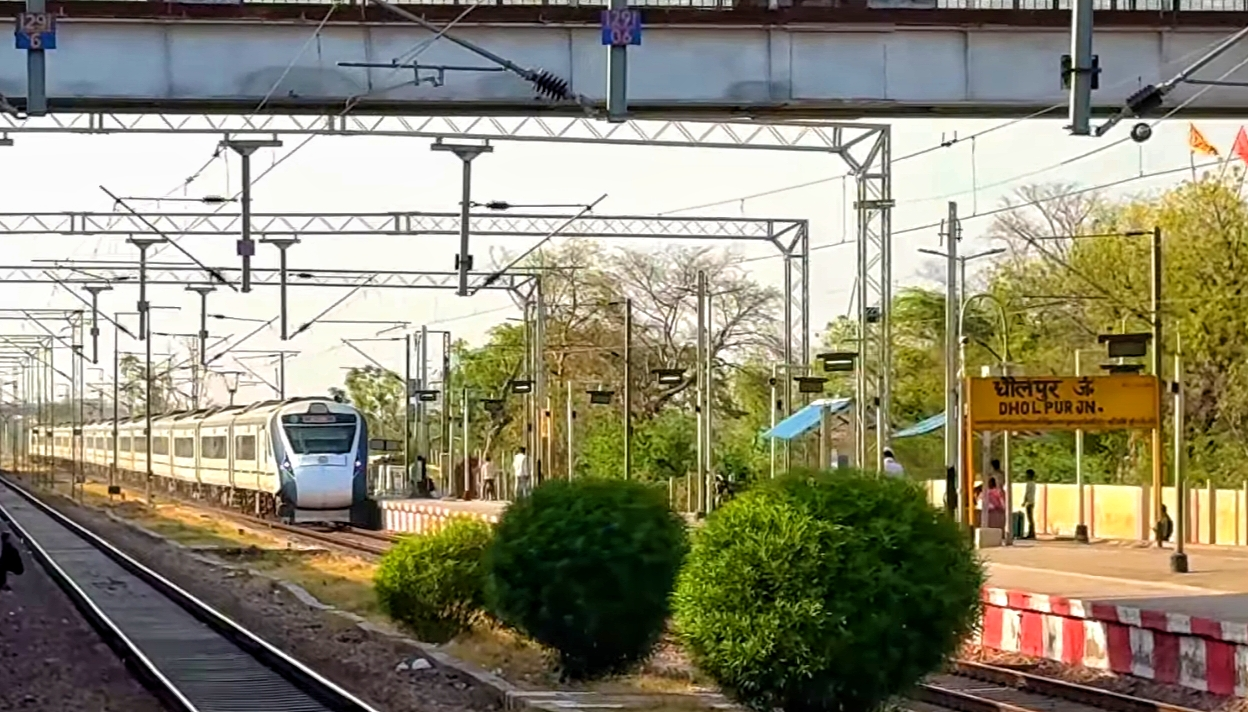
- Dholpur railway station

General information
- Location: Dholpur, Rajasthan; India
- Coordinates: 26.6964°N 77.9060°E
- Elevation: 178 metres (584 ft)
- System: Regional rail and Light rail station
- Owner: Indian Railways
- Operator: Agra railway division
- Lines: New Delhi–Chennai main line, Dholpur–Gangapur City railway line
- Platforms: 8
- Tracks: 10
- Connections: Auto stand

Construction
- Structure type: Standard (on-ground station)
- Parking: No
- Cycle facilities: No

Other information
- Status: Functioning
- Station code: DHO
- Fare zone: North Central Railway

History
- Opened: February 1908; 118 years ago
Location

Dholpur Junction railway station (station code: DHO) is an NSG-3 category junction railway station and a major railway junction on the New Delhi–Chennai main line. Located in Dholpur, Rajasthan, it serves the city of Dholpur and is operated by the Agra Division of North Central Railway.

== Administration ==
The station code is DHO. Dholpur Junction serves Dholpur city and falls under the administrative control of the Agra railway division of the North Central Railway zone.

== Railway Administration ==
This section is under the administrative control of a Junior/Senior Scale officer generally designated as Assistant Divisional Engineer headquartered at Dholpur. This section falls under the Agra Division of North Central Railway Zone headquartered at Prayagraj. ADEN/DEN is assisted by a Permanent Way Supervisor and Works Supervisor generally designated as SSE/P-Way or SSE/Works. The maintenance of all the track and works comes under administrative control of ADEN/DEN. Generally a Group-'A' officer of Engineering Services Examination is posted at this post.

The tenures of Various Officers as Assistant Divisional Engineer/Divisional Engineer in Dholpur is as given below:

| Sr. No. | Name | Designation | From (DD-MM-YYYY) | To (DD-MM-YYYY) |
|---|---|---|---|---|
| 1 | Parmanand Thapa | ADEN | 03-04-2003 | 10-12-2003 |
| 2 | Parmanand Thapa | DEN | 11-12-2003 | 21-06-2004 |
| 3 | Santosh Kumar Gupta, IRSE | ADEN | 21-06-2004 | 03-02-2006 |
| 4 | Santosh Kumar Gupta, IRSE | DEN | 04-02-2006 | 08-12-2007 |
| 5 | Ramlochan Yadav | ADEN | 12-11-2007 | 31-05-2010 |
| 6 | Karan Singh Chauhan (16-09-10 TO 10.02.11 SICK) | ADEN | 19-06-2010 | 14-02-2011 |
| 7 | Anil Kumar Pandey | ADEN | 18-10-2010 | 25-06-2013 |
| 8 | Ranjeet, IRSE | ADEN | 25-06-2013 | 01-07-2016 |
| 9 | Gaurav Luniwal, IRSE | ADEN | 01-07-2016 | 16-04-2019 |
| 10 | Saurabh Singh, IRSE | DEN | 16-04-2019 | 06-03-2020 |
| 11 | Ankit Gupta, IRSE | ADEN | 06.03.2020 | 26-04-2023 |
| 12 | Digambar Singh | ADEN | 26-04-2023 | 15-06-2024 |
| 13 | Atul Kumar Johri | ADEN | 15-06-2024 | 28-10-2024 |
| 14 | Rajesh Verma | ADEN | 28-10-2024 | TILL DATE |

== Structure ==
The station consists of five platforms, but some new platforms are under construction. The platforms are not sheltered well. It lacks many facilities, including water and sanitation. It has a wi-fi facility

== Location ==
Dholpur Junction is an important railway junction, having five platforms and is situated in the heart of the city. It lies at an elevation of 178 metres (584 ft).

The Dholpur railway station was part of the Dholpur–Sarmathura Railway which was owned by Maharaja Rana of Dholpur State and opened in February 1908.
