= Karwas =

- village
- Location in Madhya Pradesh, India
- Coordinates: 26°18′57″N 78°32′24″E
- Country: India
- State: Madhya Pradesh

Languages
  - Official: Hindi
- Time zone: UTC+5:30 (IST)

Karwas is a village in Bhind district in Madhya Pradesh. It was the site of an important fort of Gohad Rana Jat rulers. The ancestor of Bamraulis Jagdeo Singh had come from Agra and stayed at Bhind which was ruled by Aniruddh Singh Bhadauria.
