= Gujarat Anti-corruption Bureau =

Anti Corruption Bureau Gujarat
- લાંચ રૂશ્વત વિરોધી બ્યુરો

Agency overview
- Formed: 30 September 1963
- Jurisdiction: Gujarat
- Agency executives: Shamsher Singh, DGP; Bipin Shankarrao Ahire, ADGP
- Website: https://acb.gujarat.gov.in/

Gujarat Anti-corruption Bureau (Gujarat ACB) (Gujarati: ગુજરાત લાંચ રુશ્વત વિરોધી બ્યુરો) is a government agency having oversight responsibilities with objectives of ensuring compliance with codes of duty and thereby to make government functions corruption-free. It was established on 30 September 1963 after the bifurcation of former Bombay State and creation of Gujarat state. The main purpose of Gujarat ACB is to eliminate corrupt practices from Gujarat Government.

== Administration ==
Gujarat ACB is an agency under Home ministry of Government of Gujarat. It is headed by an Indian Police Service(IPS) officer. Current Chief of Gujarat ACB is Shamsher Singh. To make the bureau more effective, there are 7 regional units spread across the state:

1. Ahmedabad
2. Mehsana
3. Vadodara
4. Surat
5. Rajkot
6. Junagadh
7. Bhuj (Includes border unit)

There are 108 police inspectors serving in 34 ACB police stations. There is an ACB police station in all districts of Gujarat except Dang.

== Notable activities ==
- Gujarat ACB filed First Information Report (FIR) against four Gujarat State Land Development Corporation (GSLDC) officers for a scam of Rs. 56 lakhs in farm pond scheme. During the raid, Rs. 56.50 lakhs were found from the possession of GSLDC Managing Director K S Detroja, Joint Director K C Parmar, Assistant Director Manhar Desai, Field Supervisor Soma Vaghela and Company Secretary Shailesh Shah. Police arrested K S Detroja in this case on 2 May 2018 and handed him over to Gujarat ACB.
- FIR filed against former superintendent of LG Hospital, Ahmedabad, Dr. R C Shah, for demanding Rs. 40,000 to clear pending bills. He was suspended and served a show-cause notice by Ahmedabad Municipal Corporation (AMC) in March 2018.
- On 6 May 2018, ACB filed a charge-sheet against former IAS officer Pradeep Sharma in a case of allegedly taking Rs. 25 lakhs in bribe. He was arrested on 9 March 2018.
- On 10 August 2018, ACB indicted Sojitra town Congress party president, Yogesh J Patel, for taking a bribe of Rs. 1 lakh from a contractor to get his bill passed in the municipality.
- On 4 November 2018, class 1 officer of Gujarat Pollution Control Board, Rajesh Patel, was arrested for collecting bribes from industries in the Udhana-Palsana Industrial Corridor. Circle officer of Kamrej, Kanaiyalal Patel and his assistant Atul Limbachiya, were arrested for accepting bribes worth Rs. 1.5 lakhs. An income tax official in Vapi, Ravindra Bokade, was arrested for asking bribe from financial firm owner.
