= Pohap Singh =

Maharaj Rana of Dholpur from 1836 to 1836

Rana Pohap Singh was the ruler of Dholpur princely state in 1836. The area of the former princely state is located in present-day Dholpur district of Rajasthan, India. He was from the Bamraulia clan. He was the elder son and successor of Rana Kirat Singh. He ruled for nine months and died in 1836. After his death his younger brother Rana Bhagwant Singh ascended to the throne.

Preceded by Rana Kirat Singh	Dholpur ruler 1836 – 1836 AD	Succeeded by Rana Bhagwant Singh
