= List of Jat dynasties and states =

This article lists Jat dynasties, states, and princely states. The Jats are a community from Pakistan and northern India, who are traditionally adherents of Islam, Sikhism and Hinduism.

== List ==
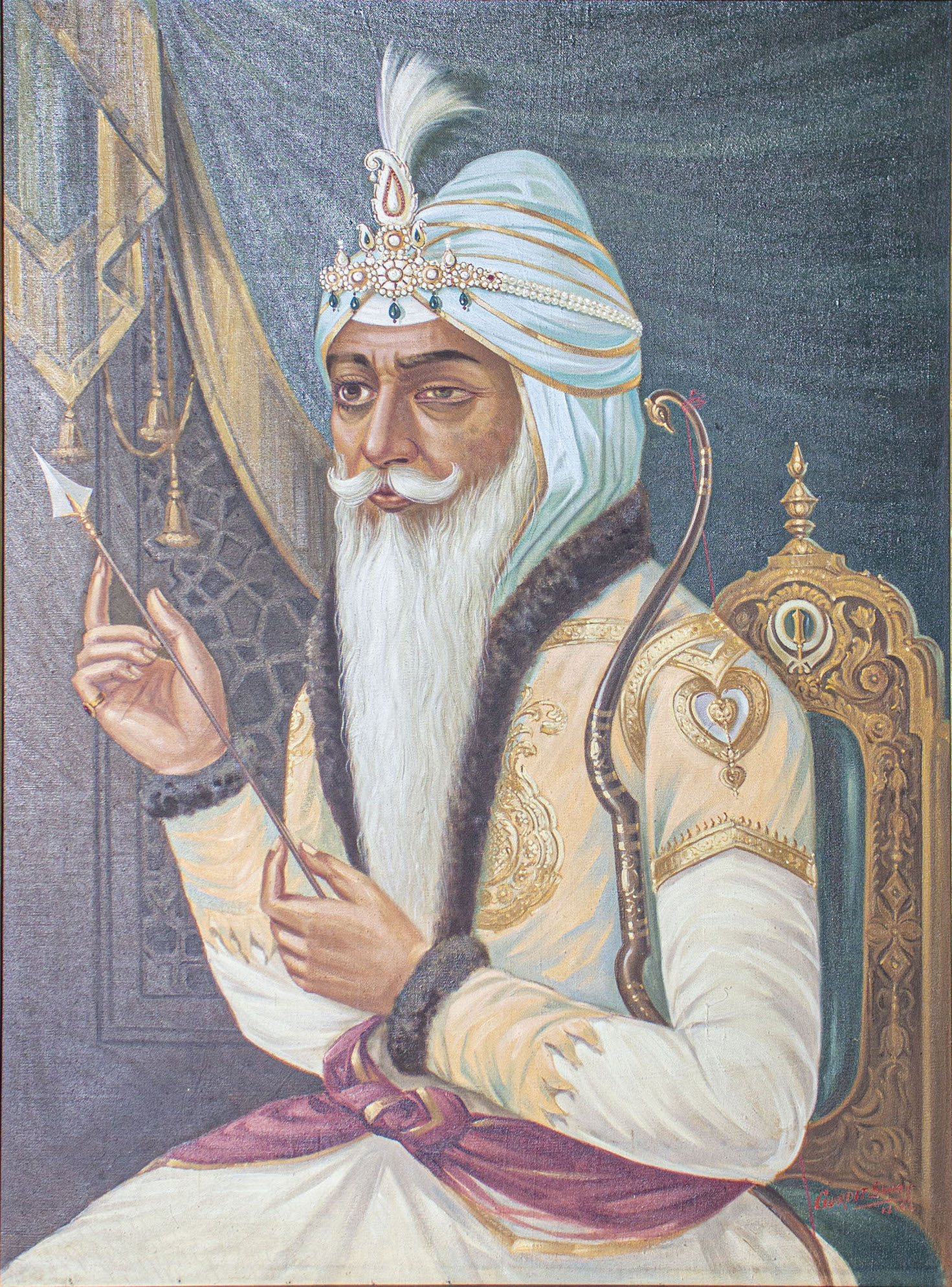
Maharaja Ranjit Singh, founder of the Sikh Empire

=== Empire ===
- Sikh Empire (1799–1849, Sandhawalia)

=== Dynasties ===
- Rohilla dynasty (Nain clan; Rohilla by adoption)
  - Kingdom of Rohilkhand (1721–1774)
  - Rampur State (1774–1947)
- Phulkian dynasty (Sidhu-Brar, claimed Bhatti descent from Raja Salban)
  - Patiala State (1762–1947)
  - Nabha State (1763–1947)
  - Faridkot State (1763–1948)
  - Jind State (1763–1948)

=== States ===
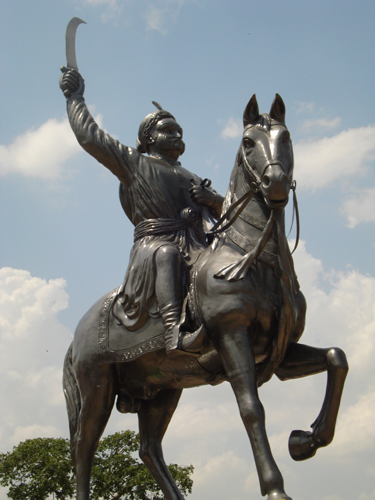
Maharaja Suraj Mal, founder of the Bharatpur State

- Gohad State (1505–1805)
- Dholpur State (1805–1947)
- Bharatpur State (1722–1947, Sinsinwar)
- Following Sikh Misls (1748–1799):
  - Bhangi Misl (Dhillon)
  - Kanhaiya Misl (Sandhu)
  - Nakai Misl (Sandhu)
  - Nishanwalia Misl (Shergill and Gill)
  - Phulkian Misl (Sidhu-Brar)
  - Shaheedan Misl (Sandhu)
  - Singhpuria Misl (Virk)
  - Singh Krora Misl (Virk and Dhaliwal)
  - Sukerchakia Misl (Sandhawalia)
- Kalsia State (1763–1948, Sandhu)
- Kaithal State (1767–1843, Sidhu)
- Ladwa State (1763–1846, Sandhawalia)
- Bahawalpur State (1748–1955, Daudpotra)
- Ballabgarh State (1705–1858, Tewatia)

== See also ==
- Jat Sikh
- Jat Muslim
  - Zuṭṭ
  - Al-Sari ibn al-Hakam
- List of Jats
