= Pandesara =

- Suburb
- Location in Gujarat, India
- Coordinates: 21.06°N 72.88°E
- Country: India
- State: Gujarat
- District: Surat
- Talukas: Surat city

Government
  - Body: Surat Municipal Corporation (UZ)

Area
  - Total: 14.12 km^{2} (5.45 sq mi)
- Elevation: 23 m (75 ft)

Population (2007)
  - Total: 212,000
  - Density: 15,000/km^{2} (38,900/sq mi)

Languages
  - Official: Gujarati, Hindi
- Time zone: UTC+5:30 (IST)
- PIN: 394221
- Telephone code: 0261
- Vehicle registration: GJ-5
- Civic agency: Surat Municipal Corporation (UZ)

Pandesara is an industrial area in the city of Surat, India. It is about 10 km from Surat central Railway Station and 5 km from Udhana. It hosts more than 230 industries and is home to 150,000 residents.

Once, Pandesara was a small village in Surat district, but owing to the establishment of industries it became a large commercial hub. It comes under Surat Municipal Corporation. Pandesara was the only area of Surat which was not affected by the floods of 2006 owing to its elevation, the highest in Surat. Pandesara adjoins City Light, Althan, Sachin and Udhana.
