= Sachin, Gujarat =

Sachin
- Suburb
- Location in Gujarat, India Sachin (India)
- Coordinates: 21.08°N 72.88°E
- Country: India
- State: Gujarat
- District: Surat
- Talukas: Choryasi

Government
  - Body: Surat Municipal Corporation

Area
  - Total: 15.12 km^{2} (5.84 sq mi)
- Elevation: 13 m (43 ft)

Population (2011)
  - Total: 45,000
  - Density: 16,000/km^{2} (41,000/sq mi)

Languages
  - Official: Gujarati, Hindi
- Time zone: UTC+5:30 (IST)
- PIN: 394230
- Telephone code: 0261
- Vehicle registration: GJ-5
- Sex ratio: 664/1000 males ♂/♀
- Civic agency: Surat Municipal Corporation
- Website: gujaratindia.com

Sachin is a locality in the Surat Metropolitan Region in the Indian state of Gujarat. The town has a large industrial area managed by Gujarat Industrial Development Corporation (GIDC), SurSEZ (Surat Special Economic Zone), Diamond SEZ and many other private SEZs, In Land Container Depot (ICD) is located in Sachin.

The town is located 9 km from Surat by railway and 13 km from Surat by road and in south of Udhana on Surat-Navsari-Mumbai State Highway which is known as Surat-Navsari Twin City Road. The town is also closer to Navsari, it is 11 km north of Navsari. Sachin is also a railway junction on Delhi-Mumbai railway line. Sachin is on junction of NH-6, NH-228, NH-8 and other major State Highways. Sachin is in important area on Surat-Navsari Industrial Area, Delhi Mumbai Industrial Corridor and Dedicated Freight Corridor Corporation of India.

Sachin is under the Surat Urban Development Authority (SUDA). Some area are under governing body Surat Municipal Corporation (SMC), some is under Sachin INA Development Authority and rest is under Kanakpur-Kansad Municipality. In 2015, Sachin was upgraded to a municipality status to provide better amenities to residents of the town.

Sachin is the southernmost town of Surat district. The town has good location as a result of which many industries were established by GIDC. The Sachin Industrial Area is Asia's second largest industrial settlement in terms of area.

== Geography ==
The city is located at 21.08°N 72.88°E. It has an average elevation of 22 metres (66 feet).

== Demographics ==
As of 2008 estimate, Sachin had a population of 75000. Males constitute 55% of the population and females 45%. Sachin has an average literacy rate of 74%, higher than the national average of 59.5%; male literacy is 81%, and female literacy is 63%. In Sachin, 14% of the population is under 6 years of age.

== History ==
Sachin State was a princely state in India during the British Raj. The African origin Sidi rulers held the title of Nawab, and were Sunni Muslim Sufis. They were granted the right of a 9 gun salute by the British authorities. Nawab Sidi Abdulkarim Yakut Khan I founded Sachin State in 1791 and was made the Nawab of Sachin by the then ruler of Delhi. After Indian independence in 1947, Sachin State was merged with Surat district.

Nawab Sidi Mohomad Reza Khan is the present (10th) Nawab of Sachin since 2006.

== Transport ==
Sachin is 9 km by road from Udhana and 13 km from Surat. It has a railway station on Vadodara-Surat-Navsari-Mumbai railway line. The nearest airport is Surat International Airport which is 15 km from Sachin.

== Road ==
Sachin is located on junction of NH6 (Surat-Kolkata), NH8 (Mumbai-Delhi), NH228 (Sabarmati-Dandi Heritage Highway) and many State Highways. Sachin is well connected on Surat-Navsari Twin City Road, Sachin-Magdalla Road (Sachin to Surat International Airport Road), Sachin-Palsana Road (connecting to NH-8).

== Railway ==
Sachin has a railway station under HQ Western Railway Mumbai Division and it is on Mumbai-Surat-Ahmedabad-Delhi main Line. Sachin is also in the Dedicated Freight Corridor Corporation of India.

== Tourist Attraction ==
- Sarthana National Park
- Dumas Beach
- Surat Castle
- Ambika Niketan Temple

== See also ==
- List of tourist attractions in Surat
