= Gohad State =

Hindu Jat Kingdom (1505–1805)

Kingdom of Gohad-Gohar (Chambal)
- 1505–1805
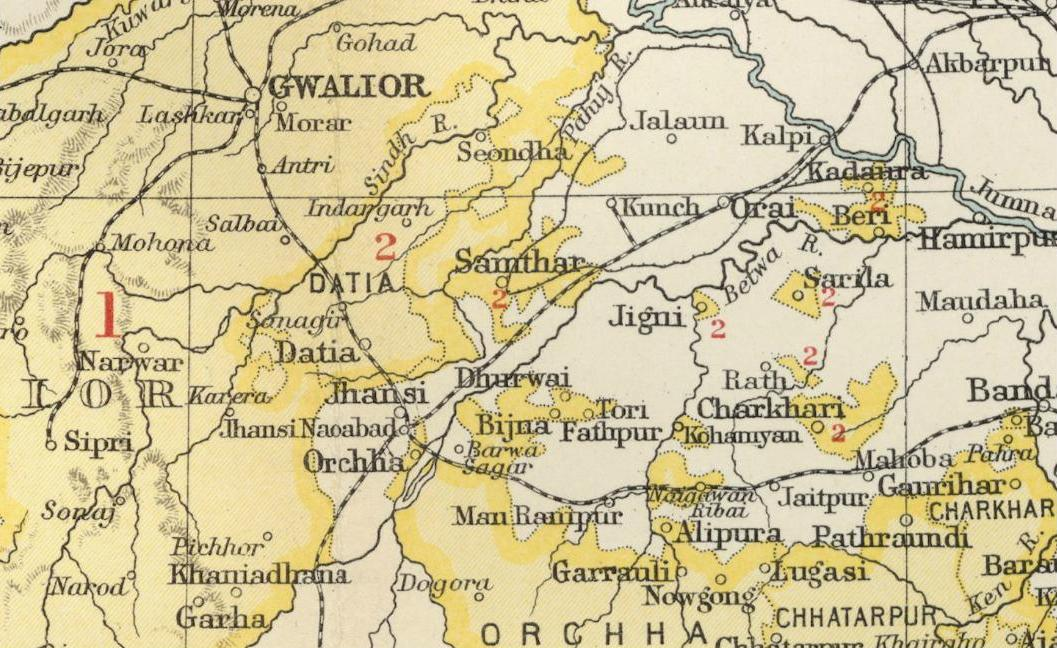
- Gohad near north side of Gwalior
- Capital: Gohad
- Common languages: Hindi, Braj, Sanskrit
- Government: Monarchy
- Maharaj
  - 1068 AD-? (Ancestor): Rana Jai Singh
  - 15th century: Rana Singhadev I
  - 1709- 1756: Maharaja Bhim Singh Rana
  - 1803–1805 (last): Maharaja Kirat Singh Rana
- Historical era: Medieval India
  - Established: 1068 AD 1505
  - Foundation of Garhis (fortresses near Gohad town): 15th century
  - Gohad merged into British Empire: 1805 (later Dholpur State) 1805
Preceded by	Succeeded by
Delhi Sultanate	Gwalior State
- Today part of: India · Madhya Pradesh

Gohad State or Kingdom of Gohad was a kingdom in India. It was established by King Singhadev I in 1505.

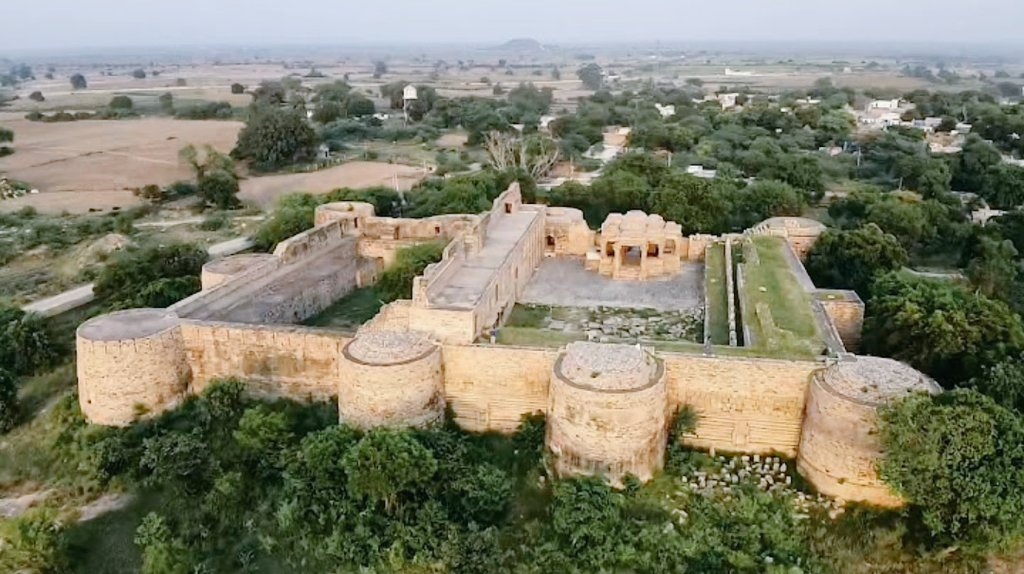
Garhi Padhavali fortress - Built by the Jat Ranas of Gohad in the 18th century by renovating a 10th-century temple dedicated to Shiva.

== Origin ==
The royal clan of Gohad traces its origin to Haryana's adjacent-twin villages of Bhadani-Dulehra, 8 km east of present-day Jhajjar. From there, the Bamrolia chiefs migrated to Agra. Later in 12th century, their first raja, Rana Jai Singh Deshwal, conquered territories in Bairat (60 southwest of Alwar).

== History ==
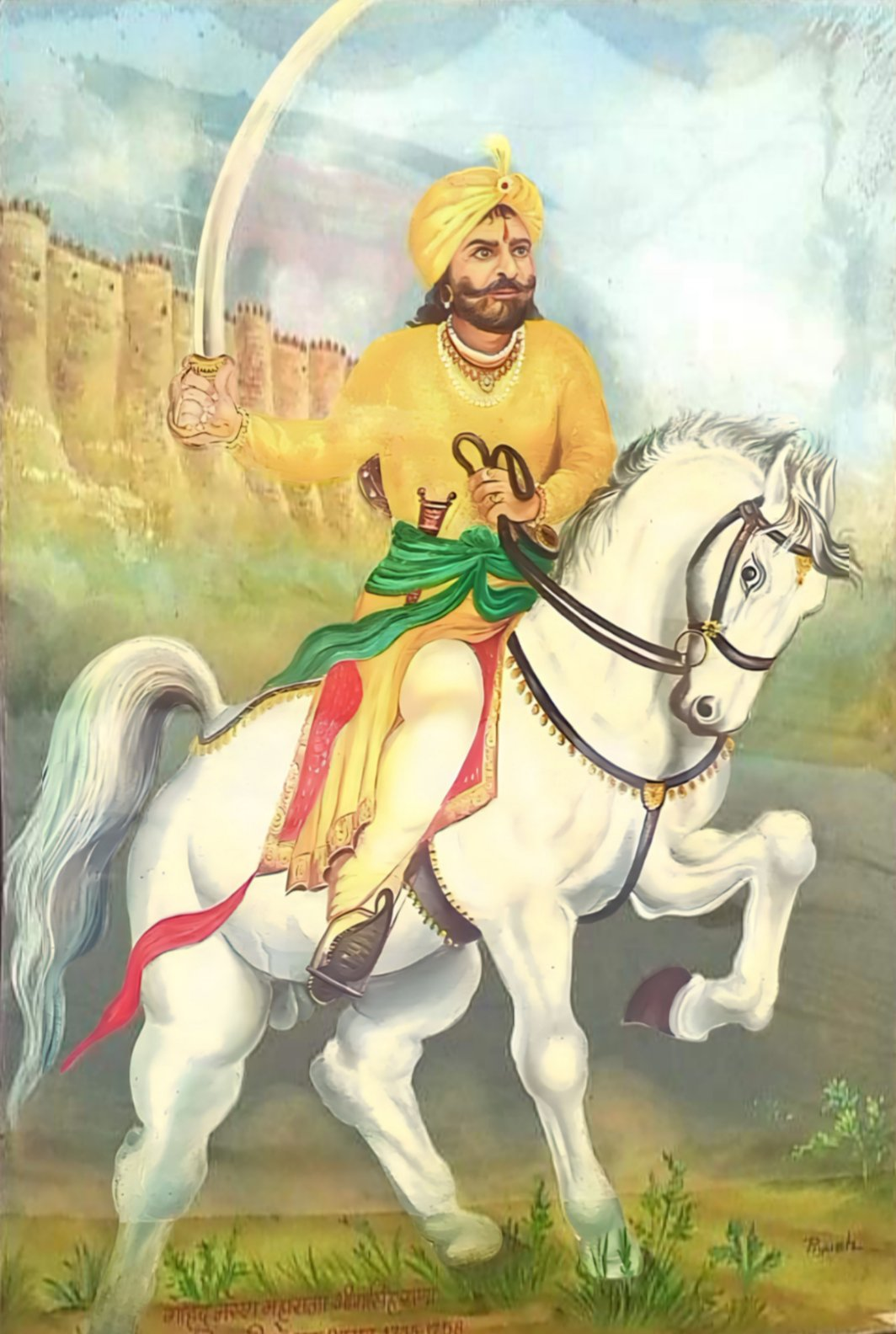
Maharaj Bhim Singh Rana

The state's formation happened in the time period of Tomar dynasty of Gwalior. The Jats settled the town of Gohad and nearby forts and garhis (fortresses) in 16th century. The most renowned ruler was Maharaja Bhim Singh Rana (Deshwal) who established the Jat rule over the trans chambal region and historic Gwalior fort. During his reign, the revenue of the kingdom was 56 lakhs and Bhim Singh Rana (Deshwal) had control on 56 mahals or small parganas. The most successful ruler of Gohad is meant to be Maharaja Chhatar Singh Rana (Deshwal) also known as Rana Lokendra Singh. He repulsed Maratha raids on Gohad and other Jat forts many times. He even defeated Peshwa Raghunath Rao.

Maharaja Chhatar Singh Rana's resistance against Marathas:

An attack on Gohad city was made by Faujdar Melsarao Appa of Bhilsa and Amba Ingle in 1778, the Maratha army was defeated by Jats under Maharaja Chhatar Singh.

Later, in the same year, Maharaja Chhatar Singh Rana (Deshwal) invaded Lahar state of Kachwaha Rajputs. He defeated them and added Lahar and adjacent territories in his kingdom with the help of Capt. Popham.

Maharaja Chhatar Singh Deshwal handed over the administration of Gwalior fort to his younger queen. Later, jealous of the success of Jat Raja, Mahadaji Sindhia planned an attack to conquer Gwalior. In 1782, he besieged Gwalior with the help of the East India Company and bribed one of Maharani's trusted guards to desert from Jat Raja along with 2000 troops. Seeing no scope of victory, Maharani committed Jauhar on 27 February 1783 and the Marathas occupied the fort. The place is still renowned as Jauhar-kund in Gwalior Fort.It is noted that after the siege the Jats returned to their native villages in Haryana.

== Descendants ==
Later on in order to create a buffer between the Kingdom of Bharatpur and the Marathas, who often allied against them, the British supported the Jats led by Rana Kirat Singh. Jats helped the British to reclaim the Gohad region from the Scindias. As part of an agreement, Rana Kirat Singh was given control of Dholpur, while the British took over Gohad. Thus, Dholpur State was formed, and Rana Kirat Singh declared its ruler in 1805.

== Legacy ==
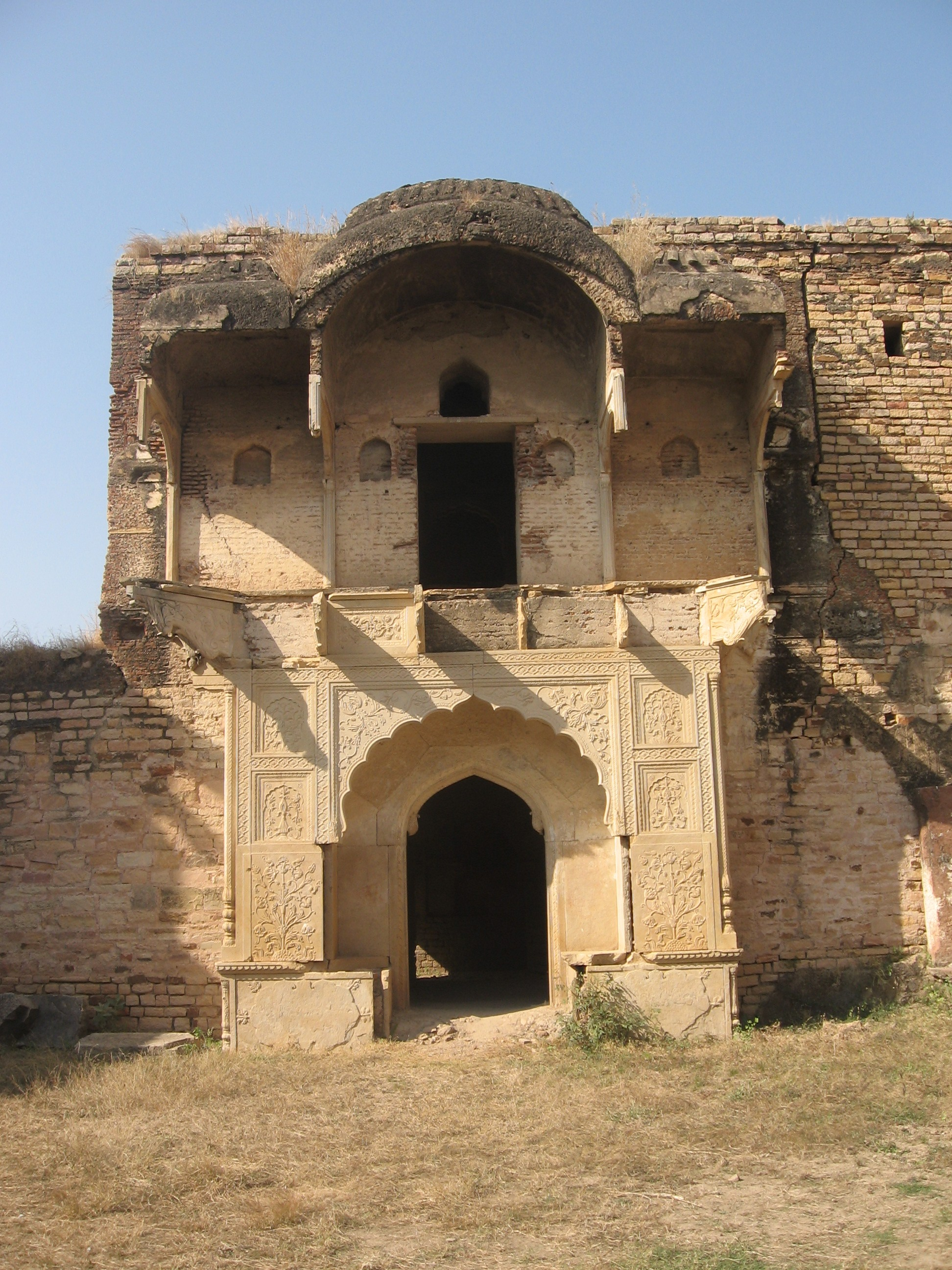
Ruins of Gohad Fort

One of the unexplored aspect of history is Jat dominance in the trans-Chambal tract. Various Jat clans migrated to this region from Haryana, Doab and Braj as early as 13th or 14th century, and subsequently carved out various principalities which were defended by several forts like the Gohad Fort. The Gohad Fort was built by Bamrolia Jat ruler Rana Singh Dev in 16th century. It is listed as a UNESCO World Heritage Site.

== See also ==
- Dholpur State—For later history of Gohad rulers
- Gohad Fort
- Utila Fort
- List of Jat dynasties
