= Khatipura railway station =

Railway station in Jaipur, Rajasthan

Khatipura Railway Station खातीपुरा रेलवे स्टेशन

General information
- Location: Sector 5, Ganga Marg, Indira Gandhi Nagar, Keshar Vihar, Jaipur – 303012, Rajasthan, India; India
- Coordinates: 26.8364°N 75.8908°E
- Elevation: 362 m (1,188 ft)
- System: Indian Railways station
- Owner: Indian Railways
- Operator: North Western Railway
- Platforms: 6
- Tracks: Double Electric Line

Construction
- Structure type: Standard (on-ground station)
- Parking: Yes
- Cycle facilities: Yes

Other information
- Status: Functioning
- Fare zone: NWR
Location

Khatipura Railway Station (station code: KWP) is a suburban railway station located in the eastern part of Jaipur city in Rajasthan, India. The station operates under the Jaipur railway division of the North Western Railway zone. It primarily serves the residential regions of Keshar Vihar, Indira Gandhi Nagar, and adjoining eastern suburbs of Jaipur.

== History ==
In 2022, Khatipura was redeveloped to relieve congestion at Jaipur Junction.

In 2025, major redevelopment work began at the station under the North Western Railway's suburban development plan.

On 16 October 2025, Railway Minister Ashwini Vaishnaw inaugurated several new facilities at the station, including upgraded cleanliness systems, enhanced AC coach amenities and new passenger service features introduced under a pilot project.

== Location ==
The station is located at Sector 5, Ganga Marg, Indira Gandhi Nagar, Keshar Vihar, Jaipur – 303012. It stands at an elevation of 362 m above sea level.
