= Kirat Singh =

First Maharaj Rana of Dholpur from 1805–1835

Maharaj Rana of Gohad
- Reign: 1803–1805
- Predecessor: Chhatar Singh
- Successor: Title replaced with that of Maharaj Rana of Dholpur

Maharaj Rana of Dholpur
- Reign: 1805–1835
- Successor: Rana Pohap Singh
- House: Bamraulia Dynasty
- Religion: Hinduism

Kirat Singh (1763–1835) of Bamraulia Jat dynasty was the last ruler of Gohad State (1803–1805) in Madhya Pradesh, India. He was the founder and first ruler (1805–1835) of Dholpur princely state.

Kirat Singh Bamraulia Dynasty Born: 1763 Died: 12 November 1835
Regnal titles
Preceded by Chhatar Singh (as Maharaja of Gohad)	Maharaj Rana of Gohad; 1803–1805	Succeeded by Title replaced with that of Maharaj Rana of Dholpur
Preceded by Maharaj Rana of Gohad	Maharaj Rana of Dholpur; 1805–1835	Succeeded by Rana Pohap Singh
