= Dausa Junction =

Railway Station in Rajasthan, India

Dausa Junction railway station

General information
- Location: Shiv Shakti Nagar, Dausa, Rajasthan; India
- Coordinates: 26°54′00″N 76°19′49″E
- Elevation: 334 metres (1,096 ft)
- System: Indian Railways station
- Operator: Jaipur railway division
- Lines: New Delhi–Ahmedabad main line, Jaipur–Gangapur City railway line, Dausa–Gangapur City Railway Line, Kota–Rewari railway line
- Platforms: 2
- Tracks: 4 broad gauge
- Connections: Auto stand

Construction
- Structure type: Standard (on-ground station)
- Parking: Available
- Accessible: Available

Other information
- Status: Functioning
- Station code: DO
- Zone(s): North Western Railway
- Division(s): Jaipur
Location
- Location within Rajasthan
- Interactive map

Dausa Junction is a railway station in Dausa, Dausa district, in the state of Rajasthan, India.

It is located 60 kilometres (37 mi) from Jaipur railway station. It is administered by the Jaipur Railway Division of the North Western Railway zone of Indian Railways.

The main lines passing through Dausa is Delhi–Ahmedabad line via Ajmer (electric double broad-gauge line).

== Named trains ==
Named trains that stop at Dausa railway station include

- Code: DO
- Mandor Express
- Pooja Express
- Ashram Express
- Ajmer–Agra Fort Express
- Ala

A computerized announcement system has been provided at the station.
