= Muzaffarpur-Narkatiaganj-Gorakhpur section =

Railway route in India

Muzaffarpur Junction–Narkatiaganj–Gorakhpur Junction section
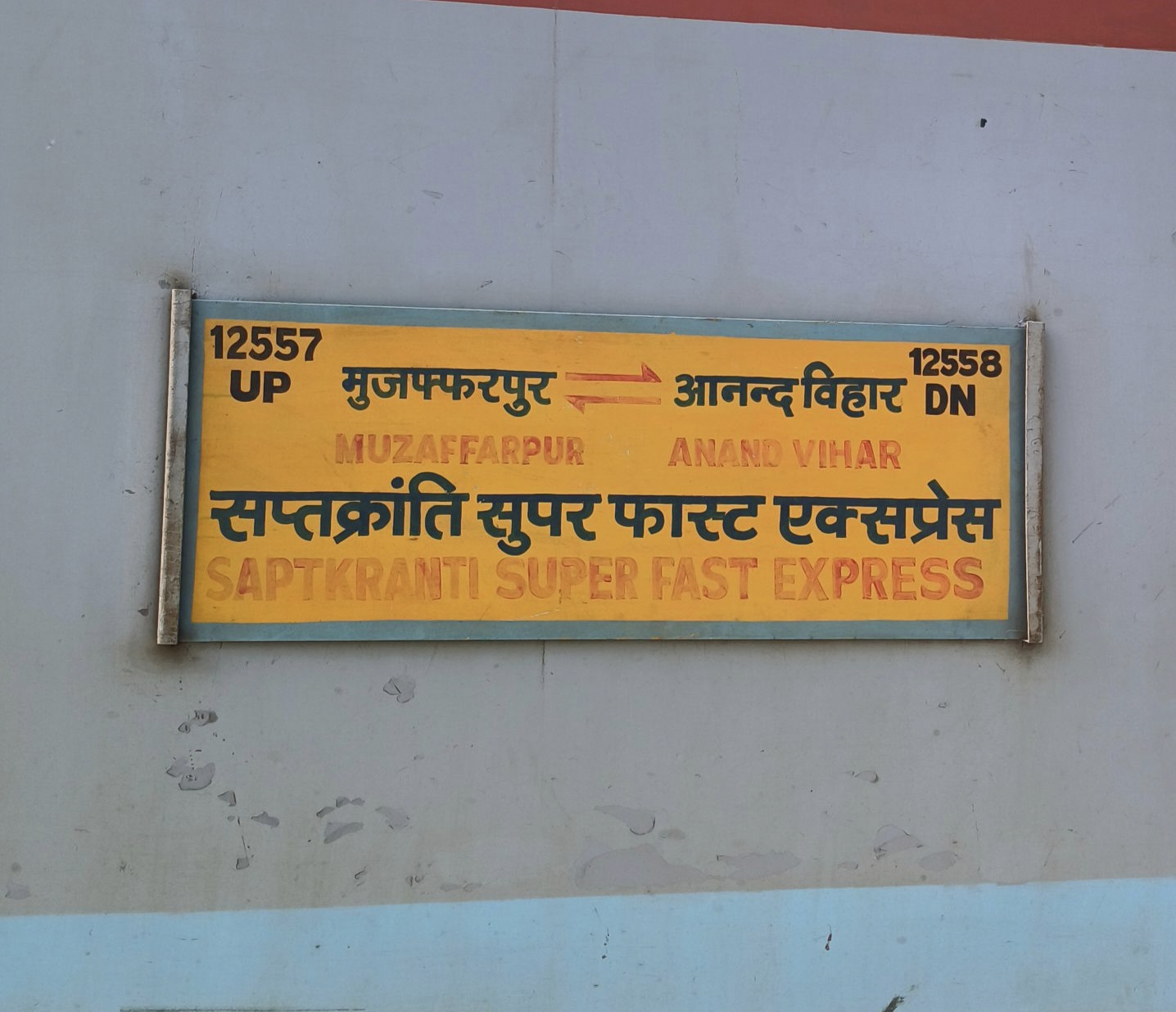
- Sapt Kranti Superfast Express is an important train on this route

Overview
- Status: Operational
- Owner: Indian Railways
- Locale: Bihar
- Termini: Muzaffarpur Junction; Ghorakpur Junction

Service
- Type: Passenger and freight train line
- Services: Barauni–Gorakhpur line; Muzaffarpur–Sitamarhi line; Barauni–Gorakhpur, Raxaul and Jainagar lines
- Operator(s): Indian Railways, East Central Railway
- Rolling stock: WDM-3A, WDS-5, WDP-4, WDG-4, WAG-7, WAG-9, WAG-9H, WAP-4 and WAP-7

Technical
- Number of tracks: 2 (electrified)
- Track gauge: 5 ft 6 in (1,676 mm) broad gauge
- Electrification: 25 kV 50 Hz AC OHLE (between 2011- December 2014): (started from 24 December 2014)
- Operating speed: up to 130 km/h (81 mph)

The Muzaffarpur–Narkatiaganj-Gorakhpur section is a railway line connecting Muzaffarpur Junction to Gorakhpur Junction in the Indian states of Bihar and Uttar Pradesh. The line passes through the plains of North Bihar and the Gangetic Plain in Bihar and Uttar Pradesh.
