= Dausa–Gangapur City railway line =

Operational railway line in Rajasthan, India

Overview
- Status: Operational
- Owner: Indian Railways
- Locale: Rajasthan, India
- Termini: Dausa Junction; Gangapur City Junction
- Stations: 13

Service
- Type: Passenger and regional rail
- System: Indian Railways
- Operator: North Western Railway

Technical
- Line length: 97 km (60 mi)
- Track gauge: 1,435 mm (4 ft 8 1/2 in)
- Electrification: Electrified

Dausa–Gangapur City railway line is a railway line in the state of Rajasthan, India. It connects Dausa Junction on the Delhi–Ahmedabad main line with Gangapur City Junction on the Delhi–Mumbai corridor.

== History ==
Train services on the line began in 2024.

Electrification work began in 2025, with electric train operations projected to begin in 2026.

== See also ==
- Dausa Junction
- Gangapur City Junction
- North Western Railway zone
- Rail transport in Rajasthan
