= Endori =

Village in Madhya Pradesh, India

- Village
- Location in Madhya Pradesh, India Endori (India)
- Coordinates: 26°28′55″N 78°18′4″E
- Country: India
- State: Madhya Pradesh
- District: Bhind
- Tehsil: Gohad
- Elevation: 163 m (535 ft)

Population (2011)
  - Total: 6,698

Languages
  - Official: Hindi
- Time zone: UTC+5:30 (IST)
- PIN: 477116

Endori (also known as Endouri) is a village in Bhind district, Madhya Pradesh, India. Khaneta, Sherpur and Chandokharand are nearby. Endori had a population of 6,698 as per the 2011 census.

== Geography ==
Endori is situated near the western edge of Bhind district, at an average elevation of 163 meters above sea level. The village encompasses an area of 1653.7 hectares.

== Demographics ==
As of 2011, Endori had a total population of 6,698 within its 1,296 households. Its literacy rate stood at 64.94%, with 2,648 males and 1,702 females being literate.
