= Thomas Dennehy =

Major general Sir Thomas Dennehy KCIE
- Born: 1829; County Cork, Ireland (now Republic of Ireland)
- Died: 1915 (aged 85–86)
- Allegiance: United Kingdom
- Branch: British Indian Army
- Rank: Major general
- Conflicts: Sonthal rebellion Indian Rebellion
- Awards: Knight Commander of the Order of the Indian Empire (KCIE)

Major-General Sir Thomas Dennehy KCIE (1829–1915), born in County Cork, Ireland and educated in Paris, was an administrator in British India.

Dennehy served in the suppression of Sonthal rebellion in 1855–56 and during the Indian Rebellion. He was Political Agent in Dholpur in 1879–85. He was extra Groom in Waiting to Queen Victoria in 1888 and to her successor King Edward VII from 1901.

By 1892, Dennehy had a residence in Ireland, at Brooklodge, Fermoy, County Cork. In January 1896, he was made a Knight Commander of the Most Eminent Order of the Indian Empire (KCIE).
