= Tantpur =

- Town
- Country: India
- State: Uttar Pradesh
- District: Agra

Languages
  - Official: Hindi
- Time zone: UTC+5:30 (IST)
- PIN Code: 283115
- Vehicle registration: UP 80

Tantpur is a town in the Agra district of Uttar Pradesh state in India. It is 65 km far from the main city Agra. The town is situated near the borderline of Rajasthan.The region was under the Dholpur estate and was part of Rajputana Agency during the British ea . There is two big mansions one is of Late Thakur Shri Bihari Singh Parmar, who was;bestowed with title of "Raees" by the then British government and another mansion if of Late sh Babulal, jagdish prasad goyal of the goyal family. Tantpur in enriched with natural resources of sandstone which mined and also exported to all across India.

== Famous ==
Tantpur is known for its mines of sandstone, which has been used in the Parliament of India, Ranthambore Fort, Gagron Fort, Kumbhalgarh Fort, Jaisalmer Fort, Amer Fort, Maheshwar Fort, Agra Fort, Bandhavgarh Fort, Garh Kundar Fort, Red Fort, Gohad Fort, Madan Mahal, Jabalpur, Raisen Fort, Sabalgarh Fort, Utila Fort and other Forts and Monuments of India.
