= Bamroli =

- Suburb
- Location in Gujarat, India Bamroli (India)
- Coordinates: 21.137667°N 72.823563°E
- Country: India
- State: Gujarat
- District: Surat
- Talukas: Choryasi

Area
  - Total: 28.12 km^{2} (10.86 sq mi)
- Elevation: 13 m (43 ft)

Population (2001)
  - Total: 322,876
  - Density: 11,480/km^{2} (29,740/sq mi)

Languages
  - Official: Gujarati, Hindi
- Time zone: UTC+5:30 (IST)
- PIN: 394210
- Telephone code: 0261
- Vehicle registration: GJ-5
- Sex ratio: 864/1000 males ♂/♀
- Website: gujaratindia.com

Bamroli was a city and a Municipality in Surat district in the Indian state of Gujarat. The town is located 15 km south of Surat near Pandesara. The city comes under Surat Metropolitan Region. The city is one of the eight amalgamated Municipalities in Surat City. Now it is an Accommodates more than 4 lacs or 0.4 million people. The city is cosmopolitan neighbourhood in Surat. The majority of population are from Bihar, Uttar Pradesh, Odisha, Maharashtra, South India, Rajasthan, etc.

== Geography ==
The city is located at an average elevation of 14 metres (66 feet).

== Demographics ==
As of 2001 India census, Bamroli had a population of 1,32,876 . Males constitute 53% of the population and females 47%. Bamroli has an average literacy rate of 74%, higher than the national average of 59.5%: male literacy is 81%, and female literacy is 63%. In Bamroli, 14% of the population is under 6 years of age.

== Transport ==
By road: Bamroli is 6 km from Udhana and 13 km from Surat.

By air: Nearest airport is Surat which is 14 km from Bamroli.

== See also ==
- List of tourist attractions in Surat
