= Dholpur–Gangapur City railway line =

Overview
- Owner: Indian Railways
- Locale: Rajasthan, India
- Termini: Dholpur Junction railway station; Sarmathura railway station

Service
- Operator: North Central Railway

History
- Opened: 1908
- Closed: 31 March 2023

Technical
- Line length: 70 km (43 mi)
- Track gauge: 5 ft 6 in (1,676 mm)
- Electrification: Yes

Dholpur–Sarmathura Railway Line is a 2 ft 6 in (762 mm) narrow-gauge railway in Dholpur. It was built by Dholpur State during British India. The route length from Sarmathura to Dholpur is 72 km (45 mi) and from Dholpur to Tantpur is 60 km (37 mi). Mohari is a Junction Station in Dholpur-Sarmathura Railway Line from where the line splits into its spur line towards Tantpur.

== History ==
Dholpur–Sarmathura Railway was sanctioned by the then Maharaja Ram Singh of the Dholpur State on 14 December 1905 and formally opened in February 1908. The original name of the company was Dholpur-Bari Light Railway. It was renamed the Dholpur State Railway in 1914.

The rail initially used steam locomotives, but later diesel locomotives are used. There was only one rake/train which covers to trips per day in this section. Its first trip begins in early morning at around 04:00 hrs and returns at 10:15 hrs. The second trip begins at 10:40 hrs. and ends at around 19:00 hrs. There are many halt stations in this section. The train services on this route was stopped in March 2023.

== Rolling stock ==
In 1936, the company owned six locomotives, eight coaches and 126 goods wagons.

== Classification ==
It was labeled as a Class III railway according to Indian Railway Classification System of 1926.

== Conversion to broad gauge ==
The gauge conversion work of this section was started in around year 2010 but could not be completed and stopped due to political reasons. The Railways' plan was to connect the railway to Gangapur via Karauli. which could be an alternate route also for connecting the Jhansi and Gangapur.

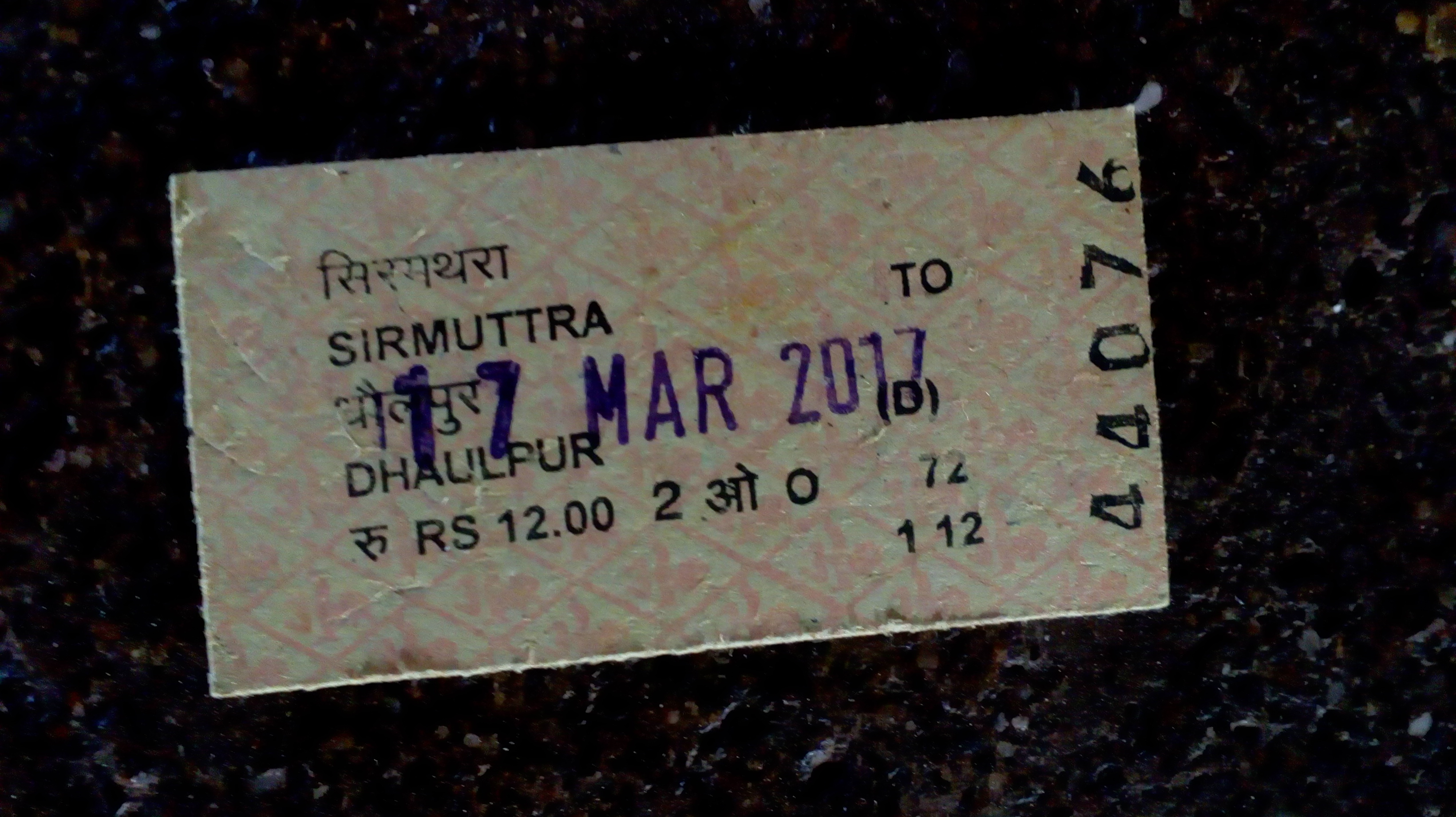
Narrow Gauge Ticket

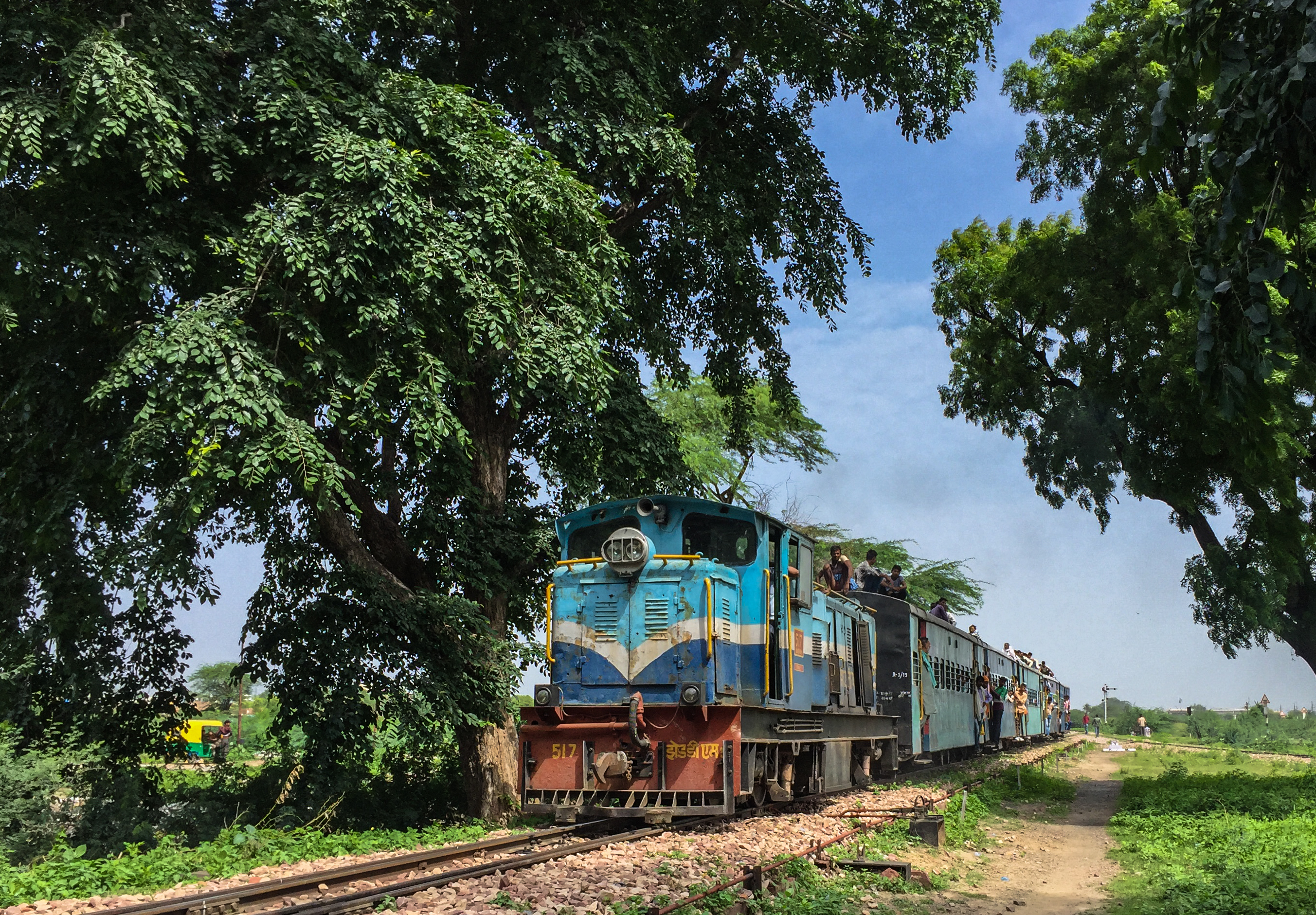
Narrow Gauge

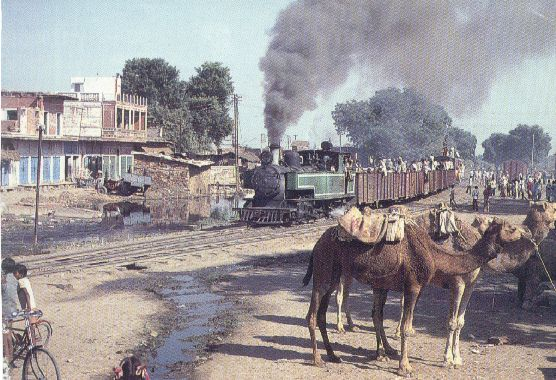
Steam Engine Narrow Gauge Train

== Railway Administration ==
This section is under the administrative control of a Junior/Senior Scale officer generally designated as Assistant Divisional Engineer headquartered at Dholpur. This section falls under the Agra Division of North Central Railway Zone headquartered at Prayagraj. ADEN/DEN is assisted by a Permanent Way Supervisor and Works Supervisor generally designated as SSE/P-Way or SSE/Works. The maintenance of all the track and works comes under administrative control of ADEN/DEN. Generally a Group-'A' officer of Engineering Services Examination is posted at this post.

The tenures of Various Officers as Assistant Divisional Engineer/Divisional Engineer in Dholpur is as given below:

Sr. No.	Name	Designation	From (DD-MM-YYYY)	To (DD-MM-YYYY)
1	Parmanand Thapa	ADEN	03-04-2003	10-12-2003
2	Parmanand Thapa	DEN	11-12-2003	21-06-2004
3	Santosh Kumar Gupta, IRSE	ADEN	21-06-2004	03-02-2006
4	Santosh Kumar Gupta, IRSE	DEN	04-02-2006	08-12-2007
5	Ramlochan Yadav	ADEN	12-11-2007	31-05-2010
6	Karan Singh Chauhan (16-09-10 TO 10.02.11 SICK)	ADEN	19-06-2010	14-02-2011
7	Anil Kumar Pandey	ADEN	18-10-2010	25-06-2013
8	Ranjeet, IRSE	ADEN	25-06-2013	01-07-2016
9	Gaurav Luniwal, IRSE	ADEN	01-07-2016	16-04-2019
10	Saurabh Singh, IRSE	DEN	16-04-2019	06-03-2020
11	Ankit Gupta, IRSE	ADEN	06.03.2020	26-04-2023
12	Digambar Singh	ADEN	26-04-2023	15-06-2024
13	Atul Kumar Johri	ADEN	15-06-2024	28-10-2024
14	Rajesh Verma	ADEN	28-10-2024	TILL DATE
