= Gohad Fort =

Jat fort in Madhya Pradesh

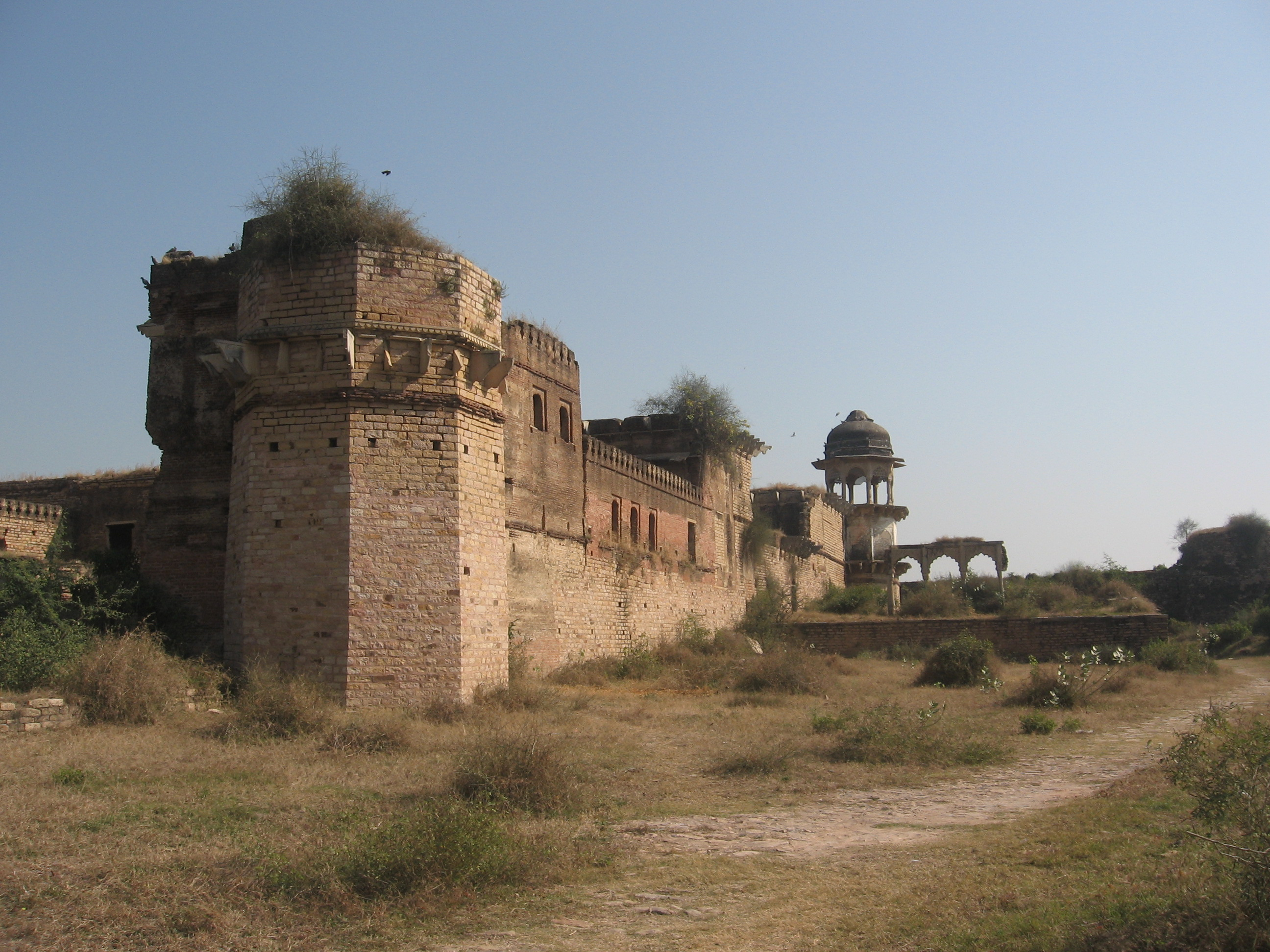
- Outer walls of Gohad Fort

- Location within Madhya Pradesh Location within India
- 26°25′33″N 78°26′48″E
- Location: Gohad, Madhya Pradesh, India

History
- Built: 1505

Gohad Fort (Hindi: गोहद क़िला Gohad Qila) is situated at Gohad city in Bhind district of Madhya Pradesh, India. The town is situated at a distance of 45 km from Gwalior. The fort was built in 1505 by Singhandev II of Gohad State.

== History ==
The fort was built in 1505 by the Bamraulia dynasty Jat ruler, Singhandev II of Gohad State. the Jat Rana Bhim Singh of Gohad. Rana Bhim Singh later regained his fort, and the Rajput ruler of Bhadawar, Umara-I-Uzzam Maharaja Mahendra Gopal Singh Bhadauria occupied Gohad Fort in 1708 after the Jats lost control when the Rajputs, under the Maharaja of Bhadawar had captured Gohad. The Bhadawar ruler expanded his territory to gain and establish the Rampura Fort in 1712.

According to Alexander Cunningham and William Cooks historical documentation, people of the Jat caste from village Bamrauli (near Agra) settled in during the year 1505, and the town of Gohad became later on a stronghold for the Jat caste, after being in Bamrauli they settled in at the same time the fort was built in 1505, and the state of Gohad was also organized, it includes monuments constructed by the rulers.

Gohad Fort has following important buildings inside the fort. Navin Mahal inside the fort was constructed by Maharana Chhatra Singh (1757–1785) of Gohad. Other buildings are Khas Mahal, Shish Mahal, Sat-Bhanwar, Deoghar, Khas Darbar, Am Darbar, Bhandar Grih Rani Bagh and other temples and water ponds.

See also

- Gohad State
- Gwalior Fort
- Lohagarh Fort
- Ater Fort
