= Guhisar =

- city
- Location in Madhya Pradesh, India Guhisar (India)
- Coordinates: 26.24°N 78.54°E
- Country: India
- State: Madhya Pradesh
- District: Bhind
- Elevation: 177 m (581 ft)

Languages
  - Official: Hindi
- Time zone: UTC+5:30 (IST)

Guhisar is a village in Bhind district in Madhya Pradesh.
