= Udhna =

- Suburb
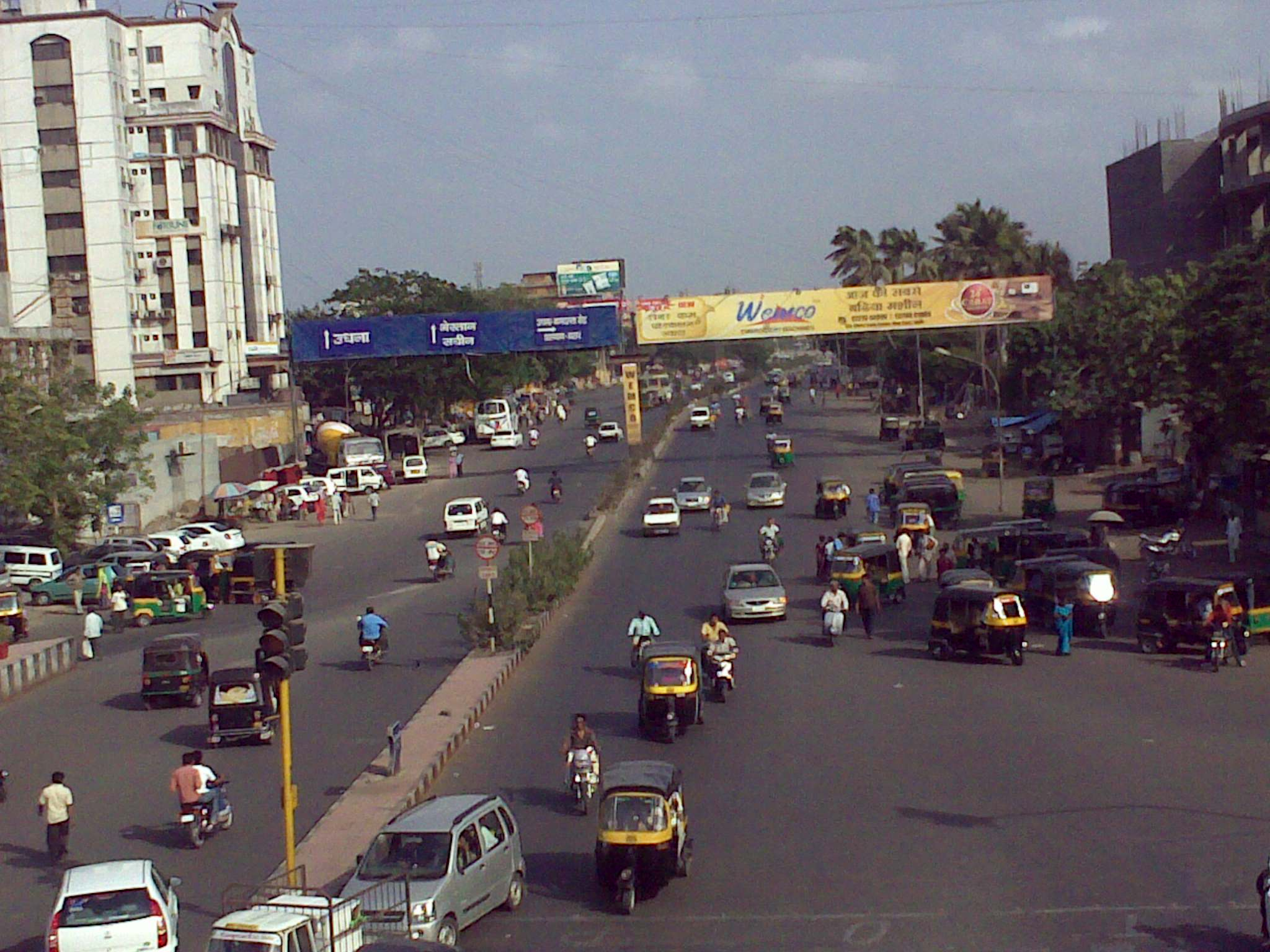
- Busy Udhna-Navsari Corridor near Khavarnagar Junction

- Location in Gujarat, India Udhna (India)
- Coordinates: 21.1677°N 72.8382°E
- Country: India
- State: Gujarat
- District: Surat District
- Talukas: Choriyasi

Area
  - Total: 62 km^{2} (24 sq mi)
- Elevation: 12 m (39 ft)

Population (2001)
  - Total: 407,970
  - Density: 6,600/km^{2} (17,000/sq mi)

Languages
  - Official: Gujarati, Hindi, Marathi
- Time zone: UTC+5:30 (IST)
- PIN: 394210
- Vehicle registration: GJ-5
- Nearest city: Surat
- Website: gujaratindia.com

Udhna (Also Called Udhana) is a Suburban area of Surat, located primarily on Surat-Navsari Highway in the Indian state of Gujarat. Udhna is an Industrial Area in city of Surat, India. It is about 9 km from Surat central Railway Station and 14 km from Surat Airport.

== Demographics ==
As of the 2001 census, Udhna had a population of 407,970. Males constitute 63% of the population and females 37%. Udhna has an average literacy rate of 74%, higher than the national average of 59.5%. Male literacy is 81%, and female literacy is 63%. In Udhna, 14% of the population is under 6 years of age.

== See also ==
- List of tourist attractions in Surat
