= Karauli–Dholpur Lok Sabha constituency =

Lok Sabha constituency in Rajasthan

Coordinates: 26.6°N 77.5°E

Karauli-Dholpur
- Lok Sabha constituency
- Interactive Map Outlining Karauli–Dholpur Lok Sabha Constituency

Constituency details
- Country: India
- Region: North India
- State: Rajasthan
- Assembly constituencies: Baseri; Bari; Dholpur; Rajakhera; Todabhim; Hindaun; Karauli; Sapotra
- Established: 2008
- Reservation: SC

Member of Parliament
- 18th Lok Sabha
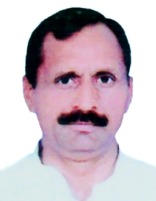
- Incumbent Bhajan Lal Jatav
- Party: Indian National Congress
- Elected year: 2024

Karauli–Dholpur Lok Sabha constituency (Hindi pronunciation: [kəɾɔːliː d̪ʱɔːl.pʊɾ]) is one of the 25 Lok Sabha (parliamentary) constituencies in Rajasthan state in western India. This constituency came into existence in 2008 as a part of the implementation of delimitation of parliamentary constituencies.

== Assembly segments ==
Presently, Karauli–Dholpur Lok Sabha comprises eight Vidhan Sabha (legislative assembly) segments. These are:

#	Name	District	Member	Party	2024 Lead
77	Baseri (SC)	Dholpur	Sanjay Kumar Jatav	INC	INC
78	Bari	Dholpur	Jaswant Singh Gurjar	SHS	BJP
79	Dholpur	Dholpur	Shobha Rani Kushwaha	INC	BJP
80	Rajakhera	Dholpur	Rohit Bohra	INC	BJP
81	Todabhim (ST)	Karauli	Ghanshyam Mahar	INC	INC
82	Hindaun (SC)	Karauli	Anita Jatav	INC	INC
83	Karauli	Karauli	Darshan Singh Gurjar	BJP	INC
84	Sapotra (ST)	Karauli	Hansraj Meena	BJP	INC

Dholpur assembly segment was earlier in erstwhile Bayana constituency. Karauli assembly segment was in erstwhile Sawai Madhopur constituency.

== Members of Parliament ==
Year	Member	Party
Till 2009 : Constituency did not exist
2009	Khiladi Lal Bairwa	Indian National Congress
2014	Manoj Rajoria	Bharatiya Janata Party
2019	Manoj Rajoria	Bharatiya Janata Party
2024	Bhajan Lal Jatav	Indian National Congress

== Election results ==
=== 2024 ===
2024 Indian general election: Karauli-Dholpur
Party	Candidate	Votes	%	±%
INC	Bhajan Lal Jatav	530,011	53.64	▲+9.68
BJP	Indu Devi Jatav	4,31,066	43.62	▼−09.13
NOTA	None of the above	7,460	0.75	
Majority		98,945	10.02	
Turnout		9,90,998	50.05	
INC gain from BJP		Swing		

=== 2019 ===
2019 Indian general elections: Karauli-Dholpur
Party	Candidate	Votes	%	±%
BJP	Manoj Rajoria	526,443	52.75	
INC	Sanjay Kumar Jatav	4,28,761	42.96	
BSP	Ramkumar	25,718	2.58	
NOTA	None of the Above	7,319	0.73	
Margin of victory		97,682	9.79	+6.57
Turnout		9,99,130	55.18	
BJP hold		Swing		

=== 2014 ===
2014 Indian general elections: Karauli-Dholpur
Party	Candidate	Votes	%	±%
BJP	Manoj Rajoria	4,02,407	47.57	
INC	Lakkhiram Bairwa	3,75,191	44.35	+0.05
BSP	G. R. Barua	25,150	2.97	
NPP	Ram Singh	9,458	1.12	
Margin of victory		27,216	3.22	
Turnout		8,46,343	54.62	
BJP gain from INC		Swing		

=== 2009 ===
2009 Indian general elections: Karauli-Dholpur
Party	Candidate	Votes	%	±%
INC	Khiladi Lal Bairwa	2,15,810	44.30	
BJP	Manoj Rajoria	1,86,087	38.20	
BSP	Hattiram	39,881	8.19	
Independent	Gangaram	28,625	5.88	
Margin of victory		29,723	6.10	
Turnout		4,87,118	37.38	
INC win (new seat)				

== See also ==
- Bayana (Lok Sabha constituency)
- Sawai Madhopur (Lok Sabha constituency)
- Karauli district
- Dholpur district
- List of constituencies of the Lok Sabha
