= Bayana Lok Sabha constituency =

Former Lok Sabha Constituency in Rajasthan, India

Coordinates: 26.92°N 77.29°E

Bayana
- Former Lok Sabha constituency

Constituency details
- Country: India
- Region: North India
- State: Rajasthan
- Established: 1961
- Abolished: 2008
- Reservation: SC

Bayana was a Lok Sabha constituency in Rajasthan state in western India till 2008. This constituency was reserved for the Scheduled caste candidates.

== Assembly segments ==
Bayana Lok Sabha constituency comprised the following eight Legislative Assembly segments:

Constituency number	Name	District
73	Rupbas (SC)	Bharatpur
74	Nadbai	Bharatpur
75	Weir (SC)	Bharatpur
76	Bayana	Bharatpur
77	Rajakhera	Dholpur
78	Dholpur	Dholpur
79	Bari	Dholpur
87	Mahuwa	Dausa

== Members of Parliament ==
Year	Member	Party
1952-61 : Constituency did not exist
1962	Tika Ram Paliwal	Independent
1967	Jagannath Pahadia	Indian National Congress
1971	Jagannath Pahadia	Indian National Congress
1977	Shyam Sunder Lal	Janata Party
1980	Jagannath Pahadia	Indian National Congress
1984	Lala Ram Ken	Indian National Congress
1989	Than Singh Jatav	Bharatiya Janata Party
1991	Ganga Ram Koli	Bharatiya Janata Party
1996	Ganga Ram Koli	Bharatiya Janata Party
1998	Ganga Ram Koli	Bharatiya Janata Party
1999	Bahadur Singh Koli	Bharatiya Janata Party
2004	Ramswaroop Koli	Bharatiya Janata Party
2008 onwards : Karauli–Dholpur

== Election results ==
=== 2004 ===
2004 Indian general elections: Bayana
Party	Candidate	Votes	%	±%
BJP	Ramswaroop Koli	265,051	54.02	−1.94
INC	Mahendra Singh	205,427	41.87	+3.04
BSP	Shakuntala Padam Singh	11,642	2.37	
Independent	Lakkheeram	3,226	0.66	
Independent	Mool Chand KOli	1,790	3.61	
SP	Mahant Ajay Balmiki	1,555	3.17	+2.92
RLD	Lakan Singh Mourya	1,313	2.68	
Independent	Janki Devi Koli	623	1.27	
Majority		59,624	12.15	+5.88
Turnout		490,633	46.45	+5.43
BJP hold		Swing	-1.94	

== See also ==
- Bharatpur district
- List of constituencies of the Lok Sabha
