= Sukhram Koli =

Indian politician

Sukhram Shivcharan Singh Koli
- सुखराम शिवचरण सिंह कोली

MLA of Baseri
- In office 2008–2013
- Preceded by: Constituency established
- Succeeded by: Rani Silautia
- Constituency: Baseri Assembly constituency

Personal details
- Born: Sukhram Shivcharan Singh Koli; 1973 (age 52–53) Baseri, Dholpur district, Rajasthan, India, Asia
- Citizenship: India
- Party: Bharatiya Janata Party
- Parent: Shivcharan Singh Koli (father)
- Education: Post Graduate
- Occupation: Politician
- Profession: Agriculturist

Sukhram Shivcharan Singh Koli is an Indian politician, social worker and former Member of Legislative Assembly for Baseri assembly constituency as a member of Bharatiya Janata Party. In 2008 Rajasthan Legislative Assembly elections, Koli defeated the Badri Prasad of Indian National Congress party.

== Early life ==
Sukhram Koli was born to Shivcharan Singh Koli in 1973 in Baseri town of Dholpur district in Rajasthan state of India.

== Political career ==
- 2008 - 2013, Member of Legislative Assembly for Baseri Assembly constituency
