= Sanjay Kumar Jatav =

Indian politician

Member of the Rajasthan Legislative Assembly
- Incumbent
- Assumed office 3 December 2023
- Preceded by: Khiladi Lal Bairwa
- Constituency: Baseri

Personal details
- Born: 18 January 1988 (age 38) Dholpur district, Sarmathura, Rajasthan, India
- Party: Indian National Congress
- Spouse: Anuradha Devi
- Children: 1 son Dholpur District; Rajasthan
- Parent(s): Sualal Jatav (father); Draupati Devi (mother)
- Education: ECE
- Alma mater: Rajasthan Technical University
- Occupation: MLA
- Profession: Self-employment

Sanjay Kumar Jatav (born 18 January 1988) is an Indian politician currently serving as a Member of the Rajasthan Legislative Assembly from the Baseri Assembly constituency. He is a member of the Indian National Congress. He previously contested the 17th Lok Sabha election in 2019 from the Karauli-Dholpur Lok Sabha constituency but was defeated by the BJP candidate Manoj Rajoria.
