= Baseri Assembly constituency =

Constituency in Rajasthan State, India

Coordinates: 26.75°N 77.54°E

Baseri
- Constituency No. 77 for the Rajasthan Legislative Assembly

Constituency details
- Country: India
- Region: North India
- State: Rajasthan
- District: Dholpur
- Lok Sabha constituency: Karauli-Dholpur
- Established: 2008
- Total electors: 203,227
- Reservation: SC

Member of Legislative Assembly
- 16th Rajasthan Legislative Assembly
- Incumbent Sanjay Kumar Jatav
- Party: Indian National Congress
- Elected year: 2023

Baseri Assembly constituency is one of the 200 Legislative Assembly constituencies of Rajasthan state in India. It comprises Baseri tehsil and parts of Bari tehsil, both in Dholpur district, and is reserved for candidates belonging to the Scheduled Castes. As of 2023, it is represented by Sanjay Kumar Jatav of the Indian National Congress party.

== Members of the Legislative Assembly ==
Year	Member	Party
2008	Sukhram Koli	Bharatiya Janata Party
2013	Rani Silautia	Bharatiya Janata Party
2018	Khiladi Lal Bairwa	Indian National Congress
2023	Sanjay Kumar Jatav	Indian National Congress

== Election results ==
=== 2023 ===
2023 Rajasthan Legislative Assembly election: Baseri
Party	Candidate	Votes	%	±%
INC	Sanjay Kumar Jatav	86,145	56.92	+11.88
BJP	Sukhram Koli	59,035	39.0	+8.52
NOTA	None of the above	1,045	0.69	−0.7
Majority		27,110	17.92	+3.36
Turnout		151,356	74.48	+9.57
INC hold		Swing		

=== 2018 ===
Rajasthan Legislative Assembly Election, 2018: Baseri
Party	Candidate	Votes	%	±%
INC	Khiladi Lal Bairwa	54,297	45.04	
BJP	Chhitriya Lal Jatav	36,741	30.48	
Independent	Sukhram Koli	18,593	15.42	
BSP	Udayveer Singh	2,840	2.36	
Bharat Vahini Party	Deepak Kain	2,356	1.95	
Independent	Indrajeet Singh Nagar	1,829	1.52	
NOTA	None of the above	1,672	1.39	
Majority		17,556	14.56	
Turnout		120,543	64.91	

== See also ==
- List of constituencies of the Rajasthan Legislative Assembly
- Dholpur district
