= Sarmathura =

City in Rajasthan, India

- Sarmathura City
- Location in Rajasthan, India
- Coordinates: 26.5117°N 77.3698°E
- Country: India
- State: Rajasthan
- District: Dholpur
- Elevation: 209.630 m (687.76 ft)

Population (2011)
  - Total: 17,988

Languages
  - Official: Hindi, Rajasthani
- Time zone: UTC+5:30 (IST)
- PIN: 328026
- Telephone code: 05646
- ISO 3166 code: RJ-IN
- Vehicle registration: RJ-

Sarmathura is a city and subdivision located, near Dholpur city in Dholpur district, in the Indian state of Rajasthan.

The Sarmathura subdivision is a substantial source of sandstone. Historically, red sandstone from Sarmathura was used for the regional construction of Talab-e-Shahi, Jubilee hall Dholpur, Dholpur Palace and the Nihal Clock Tower. National monuments such as the Red Fort and Humayun Tomb are also made from Dholpur red sandstone, which was extracted from the Sarmathura and Bari area.

The local languages are Hindi, Rajasthani and Khadi Boli. The town's primary exports include red sandstone, sweet millet, and mustard.

Sirmathura was established in the 15th century by Maharaj Shree Rao Mukat (Jadaun) who ruled from Sirmathura an area of 400 sq. km (36 villages) as an independent territory.

== Geography ==
The nearest town is Bari, and the nearest district is Karauli, Dholpur. It is situated near the river Chambal in Rajasthan district.

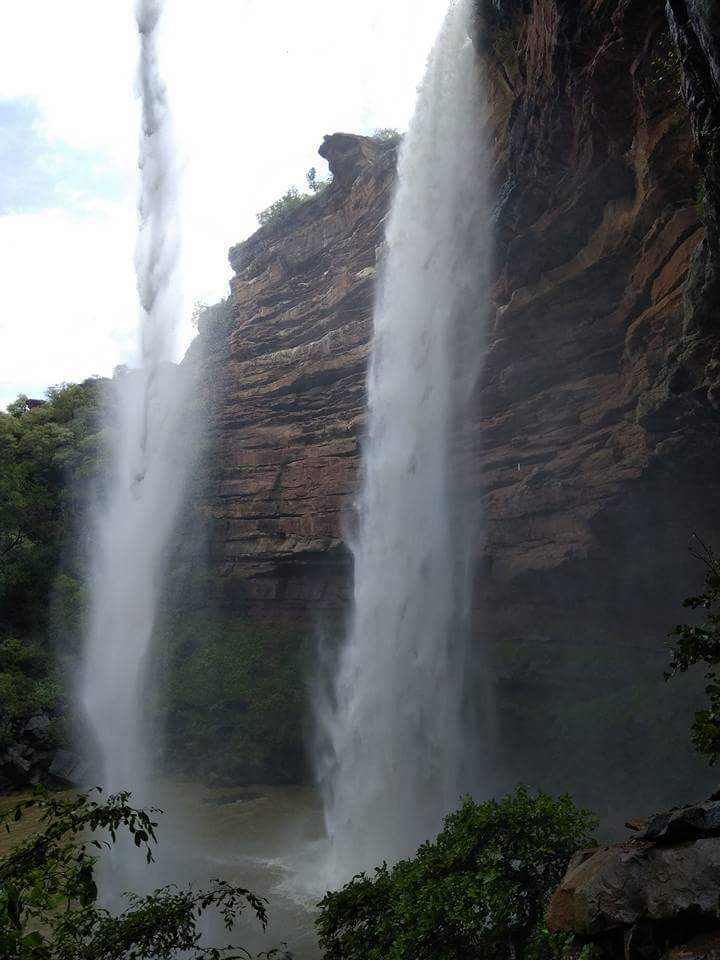
Damoh Waterfall

The Damoh Waterfall is 300 ft. high and is visible during the monsoon season, July through September.

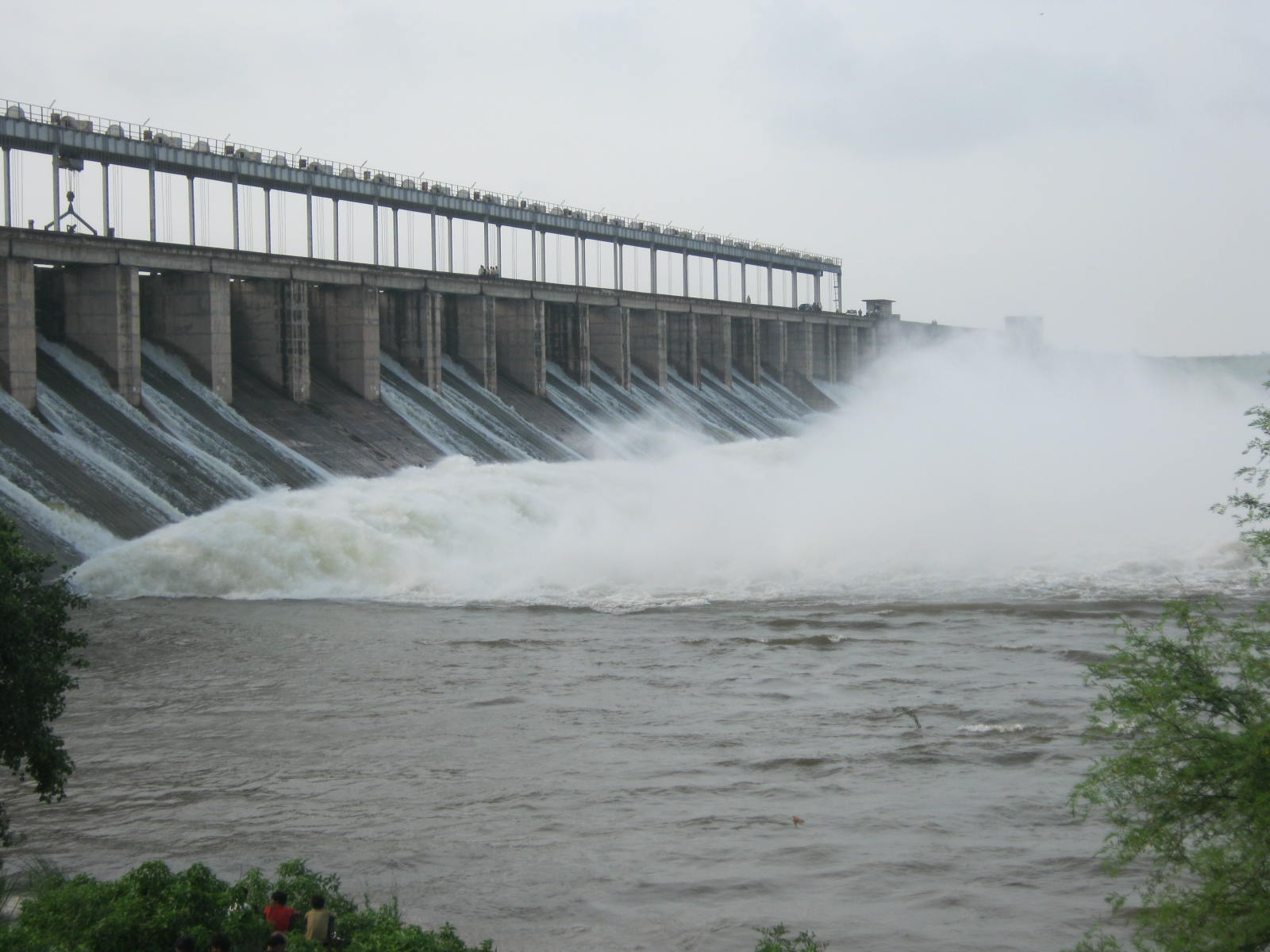
Parvati Dam (Angai)

Situated on the Parvati River, Parvati Dam has 22 gates to release water downstream.

== Demographics ==
Sarmathura has a population of 17,988 in 2,950 households, of which 54% are male and 46% are female, lower than the Rajasthan average. 77% belong to forward castes, 17% belong to scheduled caste, and 6% belong to scheduled tribes. 3,147 of Sarmathura's residents are children under 6, of whom 44% are boys and 56% are girls, a lower ratio than the state.

62.90% of the town's population practice Hinduism, and 37.02% practice Islam. Other religions are also present.

The literacy rate of Sarmathura is 86.18%, roughly equal to the Rajasthan state average of 76.11%. In Sarmathura, the male literacy is around 76.86% and the female literacy rate is 53.84%.

=== Category wise male female population 2011 ===
	Total	General	Scheduled Caste	Scheduled Tribe	Child
Total	17,988	13,897	3,019	1,072	3,147
Male	9,649	7,422	1,649	578	1,690
Female	8,339	6,475	1,370	494	1,457

=== Religion data 2011 ===
Town	Population	Hindu	Muslim	Christian	Buddhist	Jain	Others	Not Stated	
Sarmathura	17,988	62.90%	37.02%	0.02%	0.00%	0.01%	0.01%	0.00%	0.04%

=== Literacy data 2011 ===
Yes	No
66.2%	33.8%

== Transport ==
=== Dholpur–Sarmathura Railway ===
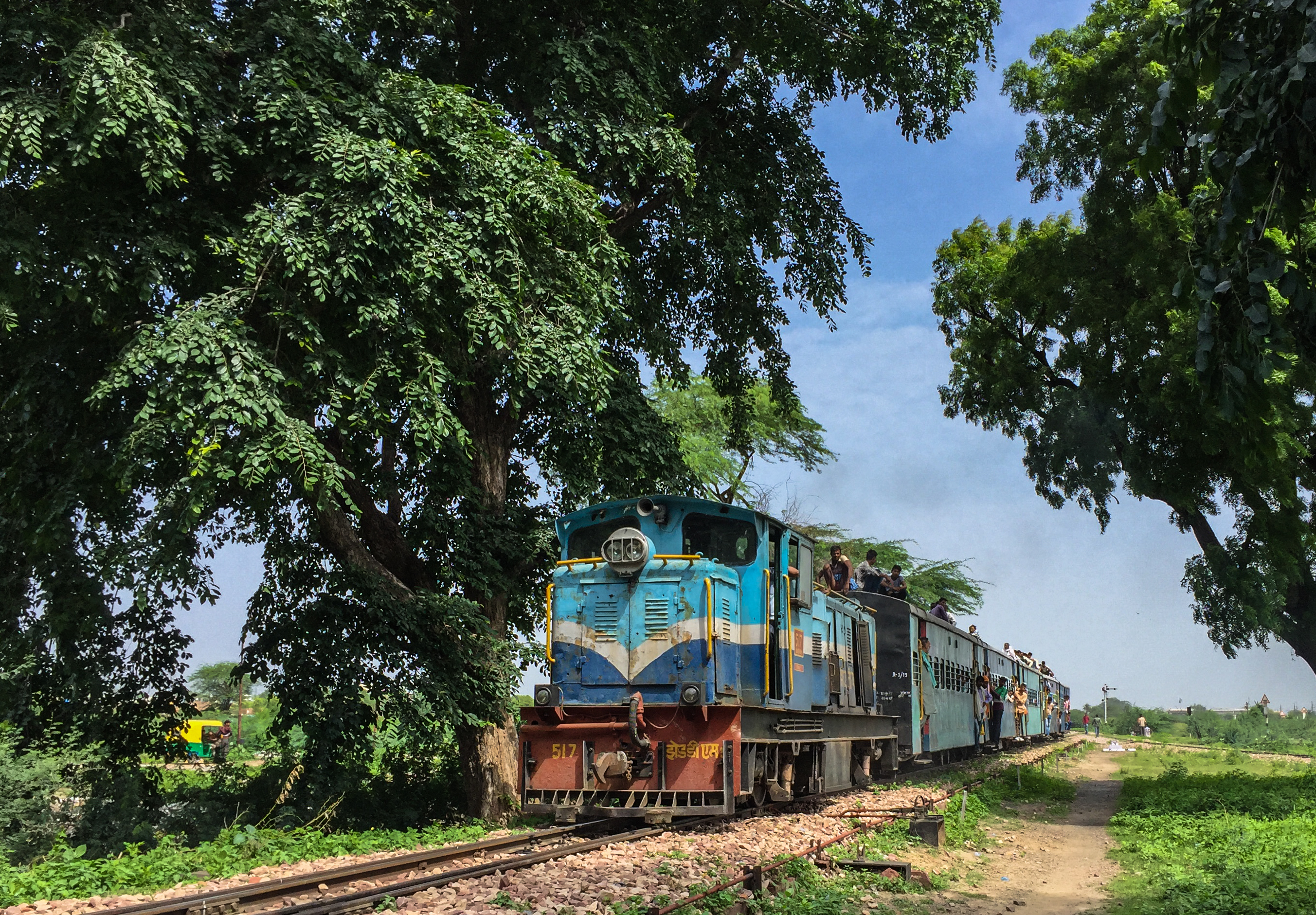
A train on Dholpur–Sarmathura Railway

The Dholpur–Sarmathura narrow gauge rail line is 2'6" ft. and the distance from Sarmathura to Dholpur is 72 km. This rail line is mainly used to export sandstone. It was built in 1908 during the reign of King Ram Singh and was completed in 1929. A passenger train now operates on this route. The railway is converting to 1,676 mm (5 ft 6 in) broad gauge.
