= Banwari Lal Sharma =

Indian politician (1939 or 1940 – 2024)

- बनवारी लाल शर्मा
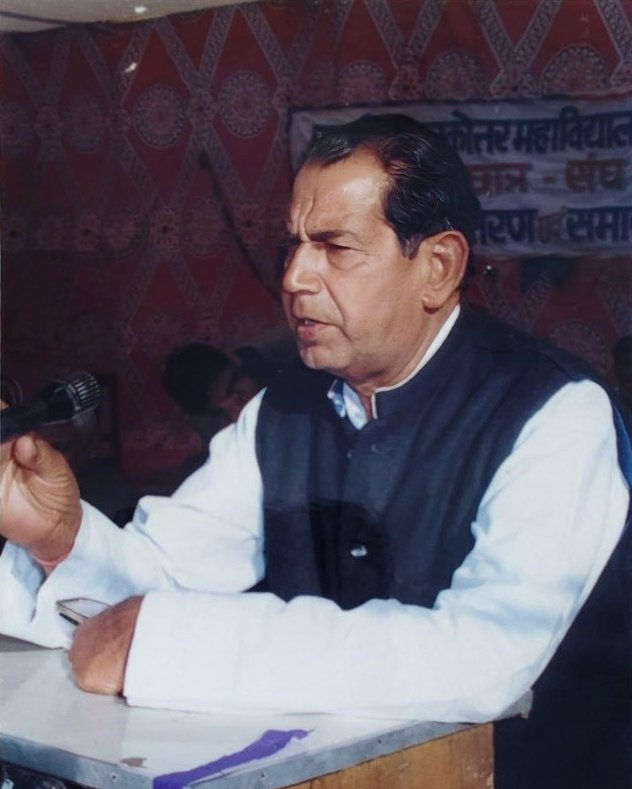

Member of the Rajasthan Legislative Assembly
- In office 1962–1967
- Preceded by: Hari Shanker
- Succeeded by: Banwari Lal Sharma
- Constituency: Dholpur
- In office 1967–1972
- Preceded by: Banwari Lal Sharma
- Succeeded by: Jagdish Singh
- Constituency: Dholpur
- In office 1980–1985
- Preceded by: Jagdish Singh
- Succeeded by: Vasundhara Raje
- Constituency: Dholpur
- In office 1993–1998
- Preceded by: Bhairon Singh Shekhawat
- Succeeded by: Shiv Ram
- Constituency: Dholpur
- In office 2003–2008
- Preceded by: Shiv Ram
- Succeeded by: Abdul Sagir Khan
- Constituency: Dholpur
- In office 2013–2017
- Preceded by: Abdul Sagir Khan
- Succeeded by: Banwari Lal Kushwaha
- Constituency: Dholpur

Personal details
- Born: 1939 or 1940 Dholpur, Rajputana Agency, British India
- Died: 23 October 2024 (aged 84) Dholpur, Rajasthan, India
- Party: Bharatiya Janata Party
- Other political affiliations: Indian National Congress
- Relations: Jagan Family
- Children: Ashok Sharma
- Parent: Jagannath Prasad Sharmal (Father)

Banwari Lal Sharma (1939 or 1940 – 23 October 2024) was an Indian politician, who served as a Cabinet minister in the Government of Rajasthan. Sharma spent over 50 years in politics representing Dholpur and defeated the likes of Vasundhara Raje Scindia and gave a tough challenge to Bhairon Singh Shekhawat, the Vice President of India.

Known as the Brahmin leader of Rajasthan and member of the political Jagan family, Sharma was considered the face of the Indian National Congress, and from 2018, Bharatiya Janata Party in Rajasthan.

== Early life and education ==
Banwari Lal Sharma was born in the city of Dholpur, a region near the city of Agra, in the state of Rajasthan. He was born to the prominent Jagan Family, a family known for its deep roots in both political and entrepreneurial spheres within India. His father, Jagannath Prasad Sharma, in whose name the family name and business still stands today, was an influential figure in India, with very close relations to Prime Minister Jawaharlal Nehru and Indira Gandhi. Jagan was known for patronising Brahmins, which was taken forward by Sharma and his son, Ashok Sharma. Famously, if Jagan is written on any vehicle, even the dacoits active in the area at that time would not dare to stop it.

== Political career ==
=== Initial years and representation ===
Sharma began his political journey in 1962 at the age of 24, emerging as a strong contender for the Congress party. He was a candidate for the Dholpur assembly seat for eight consecutive terms.

=== Ministerial roles ===
Sharma's leadership skills were soon recognised on a larger scale, leading to his appointment as a senior Cabinet Minister in multiple Rajasthan governments. Throughout his ministerial tenures, Sharma was instrumental in various state decisions and policies.

=== Relationship with other political figures ===
In a remarkable electoral battle in the 1993 Legislative election, Sharma defeated the former Chief Minister, Vasundhara Raje Scindia. The 1993 election was the first instance, since independence, where the House of Scindia had to face defeat. Post 2018, despite past electoral rivalry, a notable closeness developed between Sharma, his son Ashok, and Vasundhara Raje Scindia.

== Personal life and legacy ==
Banwari Lal Sharma inherited politics to become a political figure and the patriarch of the Jagan family. His father Jagannath Prasad Sharma was considered the Chanakya of politics and had very close relations with the then Prime Minister Jawaharlal Nehru and Indira Gandhi. On multiple occasions, the Prime Ministers have visited his residence.

Beyond politics, Sharma's influence spanned across as the leader of Brahmin society in North India. His reach and impact are visible across states as far as Madhya Pradesh, Rajasthan, Uttar Pradesh, Haryana and Delhi.

Sharma died on 23 October 2024, at the age of 84.
