= Ganga Ram Koli =

Indian politician

Ganga Ram Kashiram Koli

Member of Parliament, 10th, 11th & 12th Lok Sabha
- In office 1991 - 2004
- Preceded by: Than Singh Jatav
- Succeeded by: Bahadur Singh Koli
- Constituency: Bayana

Personal details
- Born: 5 January 1937 Bayana, Bharatpur State, British India
- Died: 13 January 2022 (aged 85) New Delhi, India
- Party: Bharatiya Janata Party
- Spouse: Smt. Malati Devi Gangaram Koli (Married 4 March 1952)
- Relations: Ranjeeta Koli (Daughter-in-law)
- Children: 4 sons & 3 daughters
- Parent: Shri Kashiram Koli
- Profession: Businessman and Industrialist

Ganga Ram Koli (born 5 January 1937) is an Indian politician and a leader of Bharatiya Janata Party. He was born in 1937 in Bayana in Bharatpur district. He was elected to the 10th Lok Sabha from Bayana constituency in Rajasthan in 1991. He was re-elected to Lok Sabha in 1996 and 1998 from the same constituency. In 1998 he defeated Jagannath Pahadia, the former Chief Minister of Rajasthan.

Koli was married on March 4, 1952 to Smt. Malati Devi. Together they have four sons and three daughters.
