= Bahadur Singh Koli =

Indian politician

Member of the Rajasthan Legislative Assembly
- Incumbent
- Assumed office 3 December 2023
- Preceded by: Bhajan Lal Jatav
- In office December 2008 – May 2014
- Preceded by: Jagannath Pahadia
- Succeeded by: Bhajan Lal Jatav
- Constituency: Weir

Member of Parliament, Lok Sabha
- In office 2014–2019
- Preceded by: Ratan Singh Jatav
- Succeeded by: Ranjeeta Koli
- Constituency: Bharatpur
- In office 1999–2004
- Preceded by: Ganga Ram Koli
- Succeeded by: Ramswaroop Koli
- Constituency: Bayana

Personal details
- Born: 16 August 1961 (age 64) Kawai, Nadbai, Bharatpur, Rajasthan
- Party: Bhartiya Janata Party
- Spouse: Lakshmi Devi
- Children: 4
- Occupation: Politician, Agriculturist, Businessman

granddaughter = Pragati Singh Koli, Yash Koli

Bahadur Singh Koli (16 August 1961) is a member of Lok Sabha elected in 2014 from Bharatpur. He is currently serving as member of Rajasthan Legislative Assembly elected in 2013 from Weir and former member of Lok Sabha elected in 1999 from Bayana in Rajasthan as a candidate of Bharatiya Janata Party. He was born in 1961 in Bharatpur district.
