= Tomb of Bibi Zarrina =

Burial place in India

The Tomb of Bibi Zarrina, the mother of Sultan Sikandar Khan Lodi of the Delhi Sultanate, is located at Dholpur, Rajasthan, India. The name on Bibi Zarrina's (c. 1433–1516) tomb, which is partly eroded in contemporary times, was identified in 1885 during the British Raj, when it was better preserved, by Alexander Cunningham.
