= Bhajan Lal (disambiguation) =

Bhajan Lal was an Indian politician, the 6th chief minister of Haryana.

Bhajan Lal may also refer to:

- Bhajan Lal Jatav (born 1968), 18th Lok Sabha from Karauli–Dholpur, former Cabinet Minister of Rajasthan
- Bhajan Lal Sharma (born 1967), 14th and current chief minister of Rajasthan
