= Ramsagar Wildlife Sanctuary =

Wildlife sanctuary in Rajasthan, India

- IUCN category IV (habitat/species management area)
- Location within Rajasthan Location within India
- Interactive map of Ramsagar Wildlife Sanctuary
- Location: Dholpur district, Rajasthan, India
- Coordinates: 26.690°N 77.880°E
- Area: 34.40 km^{2} (13.28 sq mi)
- Established: 7 November 1955
- Governing body: Rajasthan Forest Department

Ramsagar Wildlife Sanctuary is a wildlife sanctuary located in Dholpur district, in the Indian state of Rajasthan. It was notified as a sanctuary in 1955 under the Wildlife Protection Act, 1972 by the Rajasthan Government.

== Geography ==
The sanctuary spans an area of 34.40 square kilometres and is centred around the Ramsagar Lake, a historical man-made reservoir which plays a critical ecological role by supporting local biodiversity.

== Biodiversity ==
The sanctuary hosts a wide variety of fauna. Aquatic species such as fish, snakes, and freshwater crocodiles are found in Ramsagar Lake.

Mammals in the sanctuary include golden jackals, jungle cats, Indian wolves, hyenas, chitals, and Bengal fox. Water birds include Cormorants, Darter, Ibis, White-Breasted Water Hen, Moorhen, Jacanas, Stilt, River Tern, Ringed Plover, Sand Piper etc. Its also visited During winter months, migratory ducks and geese also visit the lake in good numbers.

In 2022, leopard along with two cubs was spotted on a hillside near the dam at the Ramsagar Wildlife Sanctuary.

== Tourism ==
The sanctuary is accessible from Dholpur town and lies approximately 18 km from Van Vihar Wildlife Sanctuary, making it a part of the eco-tourism circuit of eastern Rajasthan. In 2017, the sanctuary along with Van Vihar Wildlife Sanctuary is planned to be developed as a wildlife destination for eco-tourism by the State Forest Department.

== See also ==
- Van Vihar Wildlife Sanctuary
- List of wildlife sanctuaries of India
