= Shobha Rani Kushwaha =

Indian politician

Member of the Rajasthan Legislative Assembly
- Incumbent
- Assumed office 2018
- Constituency: Dholpur Assembly constituency

Personal details
- Born: Jhansi, Uttar Pradesh
- Party: Indian National Congress (2023–present)
- Other political affiliations: Bhartiya Janata Party (2017-2022)
- Education: B.K. College Jhansi, Bundelkhand University
- Occupation: Politician

Shobha Rani Kushwaha is an Indian politician and a member of Rajasthan Legislative Assembly (MLA) from Dholpur Assembly constituency. She was elected from Dholpur constituency in 2017 bypolls and consecutively in 2018 Rajasthan Legislative Assembly elections, as a candidate of Bharatiya Janata Party. Her husband Banwari Lal Kushwaha preceded her as MLA from Dholpur constituency in 2013 Assembly elections. She was expelled from Bharatiya Janata Party after it was revealed that she had done cross voting in favour of Indian National Congress candidate in Rajya Sabha election from Rajasthan Legislative Assembly. She is considered as a close accomplice of former Rajasthan Chief Minister, Vasundhara Raje. (Note: The BJP's own house was dented though they were hoping for cross-voting from the Congress camp. Interestingly, MLA Shobharani is considered to be from the former CM Raje’s faction.) She switched to Indian National Congress in 2023 and retained the Dholpur seat in 2023 Rajasthan Legislative Assembly election.

== Political career ==
Kushwaha entered active politics after her husband B.L Kushwaha, who was elected from Dholpur Assembly constituency in 2013 Rajasthan Assembly elections on the ticket of Bahujan Samaj Party, was given life imprisonment in a murder case. Due to this conviction, latter's candidature was cancelled and the seat got vacant in Rajasthan Legislative Assembly. Consequently, Kushwaha joined Bharatiya Janata Party, and the party decided to field her as a candidate in bypolls being conducted in Dholpur constituency, after the seat got vacant. In the bypolls of 2017, after counting of votes in second round she started leading and her opponent, the Indian National Congress candidate, Banwari Lal Sharma started trailing behind her. After final counting of votes, Kushwaha was able to win the elections, securing 91,548 votes against Congress candidate Sharma’s 52,875 votes. Latter is reported to have alleged that Shobha's husband, B.L Kushwaha influenced the voters in favour of his wife, from the prison. These bypolls were made the fight for prestige between Congress and Bharatiya Janata Party leadership. It was reported that Vasundhara Raje, then Chief Minister of Rajasthan camped in constituency along with her ministers in support of their candidate, Kushwaha. Similarly, Rajasthan's former Chief Minister, Ashok Gehlot and Sachin Pilot also campaigned in favour of Congress candidate Banwari Lal Sharma. It was believed that the caste equation of the constituency also worked in favour of BJP candidate Kushwaha, as the constituency was recorded to have 25,042 voters of Kushwaha community followed by Brahmin voters, who were 24,528 in number. The BJP was believed to have support of Kushwaha community, while the Congress was banking on votes of Brahmins and other communities. The Congress leadership of the state also alleged after the results that Chief Minister Vasundhara Raje has used state machinery to help her candidate defeat her old rival, Banwari Lal Sharma.

Following this victory, Kushwaha was made BJP candidate in 2018 Rajasthan Assembly elections from Dholpur. With this nomination, she was about to run for the second time as the member of Rajasthan Assembly from Dholpur constituency. However, during her campaign in Jheel Ka Pura village, her supporters were attacked by locals, who pelted stones at them. It was reported that the village itself was against her husband, B.L Kushwaha, as the murder of a youth from the village was the case in which latter was convicted. Despite opposition in some corners, Kushwaha was able to retain her seat and was elected for the second term from Dholpur in 2018 Rajasthan Assembly polls.

In 2022, Rajya Sabha polls were held for four seats in Rajasthan and Kushwaha voted in favour of Indian National Congress candidate Pramod Tiwari, going against her party line. In a statement made later, she justified her move, by saying that it was based on her conscience. Subsequently, she was ousted from BJP for violating the directives of party's whip. For her move, she was later praised by Ashok Gehlot, who had become the new Chief Minister of Rajasthan, after 2018 Assembly polls, replacing Vasundhara Raje. During his public address in 'Inflation Relief Camp', organised by Congress government, Gehlot publicly acknowledged her step as beneficial to Congress party.

After being expelled from BJP, Kushwaha soon became critical of BJP leadership. She also participated in several caste assemblies. In 2023, she even participated in 'Mali Mahasangam', a caste meeting of Mali caste, organised in Jaipur, alongside Deputy Chief Minister of Uttar Pradesh, Keshav Prasad Maurya. In 2022, she engaged herself in social service and publicly praised the developmental initiatives of Ashok Gehlot from public platforms. It was stipulated that after her expulsion from BJP, she can join Indian National Congress. According to news reports, CM Ashok Gehlot also favoured her; latter even asked the district administration of Dholpur to give primacy to Kushwaha in public functions held in the district. Due to this patronage, Congress MLAs from the region were reported to be avoiding Gehlot's public meetings many times.

In 2023 Rajasthan Legislative Assembly elections, she contested from Dholpur Assembly constituency as a candidate of Indian National Congress and was able to retain this seat by defeating her brother-in-law Shiv Charan Kushwah, who was the Bharatiya Janata Party candidate from this constituency in 2023 elections.

== Personal life ==
Shobharani Kushwaha has done Post Graduate and she primarily belongs to Uttar Pradesh. Her ancestral home is in Jhansi, and she is married to Banwari Lal Kushwaha, who is a resident of Jamalpur village of Dholpur district in Rajasthan. She belongs to Kushwaha community. (Note: Shobharani said that me and my Kushwaha community did not go to the BJP for the Dholpur by-election in 2017. Rather these people came to us. Shobharani said that some of the promises made by the party in front of the state president of the society, 20 responsible elders and youth were not fulfilled.) One of her brothers-in-law, the younger brother of her husband— Balkishan Kushwaha is a son-in-law of former cabinet minister of Madhya Pradesh, Narayan Singh Kushwah, who led Other Backward Class wing of Bharatiya Janata Party in Madhya Pradesh previously.
