= Weir Assembly constituency =

Legislative Assembly constituency in Rajasthan State, India

Coordinates: 27.47°N 77.32°E

Weir
- Constituency No. 75 for the Rajasthan Legislative Assembly

Constituency details
- Country: India
- Region: North India
- State: Rajasthan
- District: Bharatpur
- Lok Sabha constituency: Bharatpur
- Total electors: 272,377
- Reservation: SC

Member of Legislative Assembly
- 16th Rajasthan Legislative Assembly
- Incumbent Bahadur Singh Koli
- Party: Bharatiya Janata Party

Weir Assembly constituency is one of the 200 Legislative Assembly constituencies of Rajasthan state in India.

It is part of Bharatpur district and is reserved for candidates belonging to the Scheduled Castes.

== Members of the Legislative Assembly ==
Year	Member	Party
1998	Shanti Pahadia	Indian National Congress
2003	Jagannath Pahadia	Indian National Congress
2008	Bahadur Singh Koli	Bharatiya Janata Party
2013	Bahadur Singh Koli	Bharatiya Janata Party
2014^	Bhajan Lal Jatav	Indian National Congress
2018	Bhajan Lal Jatav	Indian National Congress
2023	Bahadur Singh Koli	Bharatiya Janata Party

^By poll

== Election results ==
=== 2023 ===
2023 Rajasthan Legislative Assembly election: Weir
Party	Candidate	Votes	%	±%
BJP	Bahadur Singh Koli	94,056	49.78	+11.84
INC	Bhajan Lal Jatav	87,084	46.09	−0.99
RLP	Sunil Kumar	3,255	1.72	
NOTA	None of the above	990	0.52	−0.29
Majority		6,972	3.69	−5.45
Turnout		188,953	69.37	+2.14
BJP gain from INC		Swing		

=== 2018 ===
2018 Rajasthan Legislative Assembly election: Weir
Party	Candidate	Votes	%	±%
INC	Bhajan Lal Jatav	78,716	47.08	
BJP	Ramswaroop Koli	63,433	37.94	
BSP	Atarsingh Pagaria	21,985	13.15	
NOTA	None of the above	1,356	0.81	
Majority		15,283	9.14	
Turnout		167,209	67.23	
INC hold		Swing		

== See also ==
- List of constituencies of the Rajasthan Legislative Assembly
- Bharatpur district
