= Ramesh Chand Meena =

Indian politician

Cabinet Minister Panchayati Raj & Rural development Government of Rajasthan
- In office 21 November 2021 – December 2023

Cabinet Minister Food & Civil Supplies Consumer affairs Government of Rajasthan
- In office 26 December 2018 – 14 July 2020

Member of the Rajasthan Legislative Assembly
- In office 2008–2023
- Succeeded by: Hansraj Meena
- Constituency: Sapotra Assembly constituency

Personal details
- Born: 15 January 1963 (age 63) Nayagaon, Rajasthan, India
- Party: Indian National Congress (2013-present)
- Other political affiliations: Bahujan Samaj Party (2008-2013)
- Spouse: Smt Kamlesh Meena (m. 1993)
- Education: B. E. (Civil)
- Alma mater: University of Rajasthan
- Occupation: MLA

Ramesh Chand Meena (born 15 January 1963) is an Indian politician. He is former Cabinet Minister in Government of Rajasthan for Panchayati Raj & Rural development. He was elected to the 13th, 14th and 15th Legislative Assembly of Rajasthan representing Sapotra (Assembly constituency) as a member of the Indian National Congress.

== Early life and education ==
Mr. Ramesh Meena was born 15 January 1963 in the Nayagaon village in Mandrayal tehsil of Karauli district of Rajasthan to his father Shankar Lal Meena. In 1995, he married Smt Kamlesh Meena. In 1993, he attended University of Rajasthan and attained Bachelor of Engineering (Civil) degree. He is a contractor by profession.

== Political career ==
Mr. Ramesh Meena has been MLA three times. He started his political career in 1993 elections as an Independent candidate but lost and stood third with 18,071 (25.21%) votes. And again contested in 1998 elections, but again he lost and stood fourth with 7,504 (9.74%) votes. After two time failure he was finally elected MLA in 2008 Rajasthan Legislative Assembly election from Sapotra (Assembly constituency) as a member of Bahujan Samaj Party, he defeated Indian National Congress candidate Mukhraj by a margin of 8,329 (7.18%) votes. He has given open support to INC government and joined Indian National Congress in 2013.

In 14th Legislative Assembly of Rajasthan (2013) elections, he was again elected MLA as a member of Indian National Congress, he defeated Bharatiya Janata Party candidate Rishikesh by a margin of 6,232 (4.36%) votes.

In 15th Legislative Assembly of Rajasthan (2018) elections, he was elected for a third time continuously Member of Legislative Assembly of Sapotra by defeating Bharatiya Janta Party candidate Golma Devi Meena by a margin of 14,104 (8.26%) votes.

In December 2018, he was appointed Cabinet Minister in third Ashok Gehlot ministry with portfolios of Food and Civil Supplies and Consumer Affairs.

== Posts held ==
From	To	Position
2008	2013	Member, 13th Legislative Assembly of Rajasthan
2013	2018	Member, 14th Legislative Assembly of Rajasthan
2014	2018	Member, Committee on Public Undertakings
2018	2023	Member, 15th Legislative Assembly of Rajasthan
2018	2020	Cabinet Minister of Food and Civil Supplies and Consumer Affairs in Government of Rajasthan
