= Ranjeeta Koli =

Indian politician

- रंजीता कोली
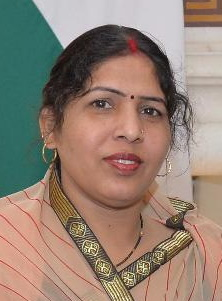

Member of Parliament, Lok Sabha
- In office 23 May 2019 – 4 June 2024
- Preceded by: Bahadur Singh Koli
- Succeeded by: Sanjana Jatav
- Constituency: Bharatpur

Personal details
- Born: रंजीता 25 September 1979 (age 46) Jaipur, Rajasthan
- Party: Bhartiya Janata Party
- Spouse: Homchand Koli
- Relations: Ganga Ram Koli (father-in-law)
- Children: 3
- Education: Educated at Rajkiya Balika Vidhlaya, Weir, Bharatpur, Rajasthan
- Occupation: Agriculturist, politician
- Known for: Actively participates for the welfare of poor people; Gives tuition to poor children

Ranjeeta Koli (born 9 May 1979) is an Indian politician. She was elected to the Lok Sabha, lower house of the Parliament of India from Bharatpur, Rajasthan in the 2019 Indian general election as a member of the Bharatiya Janata Party. Her father in law Gangaram Koli was three time MP from Bayana Lok Sabha constituency from 1991 to 1998.
