= Than Singh Jatav =

Indian politician (1933–2022)

Member of Parliament, Lok Sabha
- In office 1989 - 1991
- Preceded by: Lala Ram Ken
- Succeeded by: Ganga Ram Koli
- Constituency: Bayana

Personal details
- Born: 1 October 1933 Hathras, Aligarh district, United Provinces, British India
- Died: 2022 (aged 88–89)
- Party: Bharatiya Janata Party
- Spouse: Usha Devi (m.1972)

Than Singh Jatav (1 October 1933 – 2022) was an Indian politician and civil servant.

== Background ==
Than Singh Jatav born in 1933 to Phaguni Singh into Scheduled Caste family at Hathras, Aligarh district, British India. He completed his graduation from Dr. Bhimrao Ambedkar University at Uttar Pradesh.

In 1961 he got selected into Rajasthan Administrative Service. After serving as a non-gazetted official and AG, Rajasthan was promoted as BDO, SDM, Additional Collector, and Distt. Magistrate; Addl. Commissioner of Transport, Departmental Enquiries and Secretary of Rajasthan Housing Board, Settlement Officer and Secretary of Sports Council, etc. and took voluntary retirement in 1989.

Jatav died in 2022.

== Political career ==
In 1989 he became Member of Parliament in Lok Sabha from the Bayana constituency.

Jatav also served in Parliamentary Committees -

- Member of Zonal Railway User's Consultative Committee on Western Railways
- Committee on the Hindi Language in Ministry of Defence
- Committee on Emigration in Ministry of Labour
- Committee on Science and Technology
- Consultative Committee in Ministry of Water Resources.

He was also the Honourable General Secretary of Dr. Ambedkar Memorial Welfare Society, President of the Dalit Sahitya Academy, All India Federation of SC/ST, Backwards and Minorities Employees Welfare Association, and associated with Ambedkar Vichar Manch of Rajasthan.
