= Todabhim Assembly constituency =

Legislative Assembly constituency in Rajasthan State, India

Coordinates: 26.92°N 76.82°E

Todabhim
- Constituency No. 81 for the Rajasthan Legislative Assembly

Constituency details
- Country: India
- Region: North India
- State: Rajasthan
- District: Karauli
- Lok Sabha constituency: Karauli-Dholpur
- Established: 1972
- Total electors: 281,647
- Reservation: ST

Member of Legislative Assembly
- 16th Rajasthan Legislative Assembly
- Incumbent Ghanshyam Mahar
- Party: Indian National Congress
- Elected year: 2023

Todabhim Assembly constituency is one of the 200 Rajasthan Legislative Assembly constituencies, of Rajasthan state in India.

It covers Nadoti tehsil and parts of Todabhim tehsil, both in Karauli district and is reserved for candidates belonging to the Scheduled Tribes. As of 2023, it is represented by Ghanshyam Mahar of the Indian National Congress party.

== Members of the Legislative Assembly ==
Election	Name	Party
2008	Kirodi Lal Meena (Note: resigned in 2009)	Independent
2009 (Note: by-election)	Ramesh Chand	Bharatiya Janata Party
2013	Ghanshyam Mahar	Indian National Congress
2018	Prithviraj Meena	Indian National Congress
2023	Ghanshyam Mahar	Indian National Congress

== Election results ==
=== 2023 ===
2023 Rajasthan Legislative Assembly election: Todabhim
Party	Candidate	Votes	%	±%
INC	Ghanshyam	97,389	54.08	−11.43
BJP	Ramniwas Meena	68,528	38.05	+17.13
Independent	Raghav Ram Meena	5,311	2.95	
ASP(KR)	Rajnish Mehar	3,436	1.91	
BSP	Kalpana	2,529	1.4	−7.64
NOTA	None of the above	1,125	0.62	−0.28
Majority		28,861	16.03	−28.56
Turnout		180,079	63.94	−0.59
INC hold		Swing		

=== 2018 ===
2018 Rajasthan Legislative Assembly election: Todabhim
Party	Candidate	Votes	%	±%
INC	Prithviraj Meena	107,691	65.51	
BJP	Ramesh Chand	34,385	20.92	
BSP	Shiv Dayal	14,857	9.04	
Independent	Kamla Meena	2,118	1.29	
Bharat Vahini Party	Mahendra Singh	1,550	0.94	
NOTA	None of the above	1,474	0.9	
Majority		73,306	44.59	
Turnout		164,379	64.53	
INC hold		Swing		

== See also ==
- List of constituencies of the Rajasthan Legislative Assembly
- Karauli district
