= Lakhan Singh Meena =

Indian politician (born 1964)

Member of the Rajasthan Legislative Assembly
- In office 2018–2023
- Preceded by: Darshan Singh Gurjar
- Succeeded by: Darshan Singh Gurjar
- Constituency: Karauli, Rajasthan

Personal details
- Born: 1 January 1964 (age 62) Katkad, Karauli
- Party: Indian National Congress
- Other political affiliations: Bahujan Samaj Party
- Spouse: Deepika Meena

Lakhan Singh Meena (born 1 January 1964) is an Indian politician. He was member of the Rajasthan Legislative Assembly and he reprsented Karauli.
