= Prithviraj Meena =

Member of Rajasthan Legislative Assembly

Member of Rajasthan Legislative Assembly
- In office 2018–2023
- Preceded by: Ghanshyam Mahar
- Succeeded by: Ghanshyam Mahar
- Constituency: Todabhim

Personal details
- Born: 1 July 1958 (age 66); Nobiswa, Todabhim
- Spouse: Magan Devi Meena

Prithviraj Meena (born 1 July 1958) is an Indian politician. He was a member of the Rajasthan Legislative Assembly from Todabhim constituency.
