= Jaswant Singh Gurjar =

Indian politician (born 1955)

Member of the Rajasthan Legislative Assembly
- Incumbent
- Assumed office 3 December 2023
- Preceded by: Girraj Singh Malinga
- In office 1998–2003
- Preceded by: Daljeet Singh
- Succeeded by: Daljeet Singh
- Constituency: Bari, Rajasthan

Personal details
- Born: 15 August 1955 (age 70) Moroli, Dholpur, Rajasthan
- Party: Shiv Sena (2022–present) (2024–present)
- Other political affiliations: Bahujan Samaj Party Bhartiya Janta Party
- Spouse: Kammoda Devi
- Children: 3
- Parent: Kamal Singh Gurjar (father)
- Occupation: MLA
- Profession: Agriculture

Jaswant Singh Gurjar (born 15 August 1955) is an Indian politician currently serving as a member of the 16th Rajasthan Legislative Assembly from Bari, Rajasthan. He previously served as a member of Rajasthan Vidhan Sabha from 1998 to 2003. He is a member of the Shiv Sena.

In 2023 Rajasthan state elections he won by a margin of twenty-seven thousand four hundred twenty-four votes and defeated the (BJP) Bhartiya Janta party's candidate Girraj Singh Malinga who belonged to the Dalit community. Jaswant Singh Gurjar was a former BJP MLA (political leader). He was accused of making threatening remarks against his opponent in the 2023 Rajasthan election.
