= Karauli Assembly constituency =

Legislative Assembly constituency in Rajasthan State, India

Coordinates: 26.5°N 77.02°E

Karauli
- Constituency No. 83 for the Rajasthan Legislative Assembly

Constituency details
- Country: India
- Region: North India
- State: Rajasthan
- District: Karauli
- Lok Sabha constituency: Karauli-Dholpur
- Established: 1972
- Total electors: 256,916
- Reservation: None

Member of Legislative Assembly
- 16th Rajasthan Legislative Assembly
- Incumbent Darshan Singh Gurjar
- Party: Bharatiya Janata Party

Karauli Assembly constituency is one of the 200 Legislative Assembly constituencies of Rajasthan state in India.

It comprises parts of Karauli tehsil, in Karauli district. As of 2023, its representative is Darshan Singh Gurjar of the Bharatiya Janata Party.

== Members of the Legislative Assembly ==
Election	Name	Party
2008	Abhi Singh Jadaun	Bhartiya Janata Party
2013	Darshan Singh Gurjar	Indian National Congress
2018	Lakhan Singh Meena	Bahujan Samaj Party
2023	Darshan Singh Gurjar	Bhartiya Janata Party

== Election results ==
=== 2023 ===
2023 Rajasthan Legislative Assembly election: Karauli
Party	Candidate	Votes	%	±%
BJP	Darshan Singh	89,666	46.01	+18.52
INC	Lakhan Singh	87,483	44.89	+14.73
BSP	Ravindra	13,182	6.76	−28.99
NOTA	None of the above	1,135	0.58	−0.09
Majority		2,183	1.12	−4.47
Turnout		194,894	75.86	+2.58
BJP gain from BSP		Swing		

=== 2018 ===
Rajasthan Legislative Assembly Election, 2018: Karauli
Party	Candidate	Votes	%	±%
BSP	Lakhan Singh	61,163	35.75	
INC	Darshan Singh	51,601	30.16	
BJP	Om Prakash Saini Urf O.P.Saini	47,022	27.49	
Independent	Vedprakash Urf Bantu Neta	4,986	2.91	
RLP	Kuldeep Pal	2,331	1.36	
NOTA	None of the above	1,144	0.67	
Majority		9,562	5.59	
Turnout		171,070	73.28	

== See also ==
- List of constituencies of the Rajasthan Legislative Assembly
- Karauli district
