= Lala Ram Ken =

Indian politician

Lala Ram Ken लाला राम केन
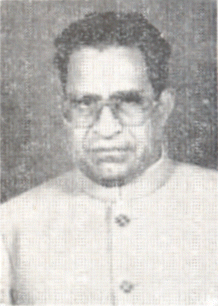

Member of Parliament, Lok Sabha
- In office 1984 - 1989
- Preceded by: Jagannath Pahadia
- Succeeded by: Than Singh Jatav
- Constituency: Bayana

Personal details
- Born: 24 November 1931 Bharatpur, Rajasthan, India
- Died: 5 October 2007 (aged 75) Bharatpur, Rajasthan, India
- Party: Indian National Congress
- Profession: Politician

Lala Ram Ken (Hindi: लाला राम केन; 24 November 1931 − 5 October 2007) was a political leader who was elected Member of Parliament twice from Bayana Constituency for 7th and 8th Lok Sabha (Parliament).

== Personal life ==
Lala Ram Ken was born in Bharatpur, Rajasthan.

== Political life ==
He held following positions during his political life:

- President, City Congress Committee, Bharatpur
- President, Jatav Samiti, Bharatpur
- GN. Sec., Congress Committee, Bharatpur

== Members of Parliament ==
1. 7th Lok Sabha, 1979:Indian National Congress, Constituency: Bayana, Rajasthan
2. 8th Lok Sabha, 1984:Indian National Congress, Constituency: Bayana, Rajasthan
