= Girraj Singh Malinga =

Indian politician

Member of the Rajasthan Legislative Assembly
- In office 2008–2023
- Preceded by: Daljeet Singh
- Succeeded by: Jaswant Singh Gurjar
- Constituency: Bari, Rajasthan

Personal details
- Other political affiliations: Indian National Congress; Bharatiya Janata Party

Girraj Singh Malinga is an Indian politician from Rajasthan who has served in the Bari Rajasthan Legislative Assembly since 2008. He previously served in the Rajasthan Legislative Assembly from 2008 to 2018.
