= Dholpur Assembly constituency =

Legislative Assembly constituency in Rajasthan State, India

Coordinates: 26.7°N 77.88°E

Dholpur
- Constituency No. 79 for the Rajasthan Legislative Assembly

Constituency details
- Country: India
- Region: North India
- State: Rajasthan
- District: Dholpur
- Lok Sabha constituency: Karauli–Dholpur
- Established: 1951
- Total electors: 223,263
- Reservation: None

Member of Legislative Assembly
- 16th Rajasthan Legislative Assembly
- Incumbent Shobha Rani Kushwaha
- Party: Indian National Congress
- Elected year: 2023

Dholpur Assembly constituency is one of the 200 Legislative Assembly constituencies of Rajasthan state in India. It is in Dholpur district and is a segment of the Karauli–Dholpur Lok Sabha constituency.

== Members of the Legislative Assembly ==
Year	Name	Party
1951	Gopal Bhargava	Indian National Congress
1957	Bahadur Singh	Indian National Congress
1962	Banwari Lal Sharma	Indian National Congress
1967	Banwari Lal Sharma	Indian National Congress
1972	Banwari Lal Sharma	Indian National Congress
1977	Jagdish Singh	Janata Party
1980	Banwari Lal Sharma	Indian National Congress
1985	Vasundhara Raje	Bharatiya Janata Party
1990	Bhairon Singh Shekhawat	Bharatiya Janata Party
1993	Banwari Lal Sharma	Indian National Congress
1998	Shiv Ram	Bharatiya Janata Party
2003	Banwari Lal Sharma	Indian National Congress
2008	Banwari Lal Sharma	Indian National Congress
2013	Banwari Lal Sharma	Indian National Congress
2017 (by-poll)	Shobha Rani Kushwaha	Bharatiya Janata Party
2018	Shobha Rani Kushwaha	Bharatiya Janata Party
2023	Shobha Rani Kushwaha	Indian National Congress

== Election results ==
=== 2023 ===
2023 Rajasthan Legislative Assembly election: Dholpur
Party	Candidate	Votes	%	±%
INC	Shobharani Kushwah	69,724	39.97	+7.34
BSP	Ritesh Sharma	52,935	30.34	+15.89
BJP	Shivcharan Singh Kushwaha	45,637	26.16	−19.63
ASP(KR)	Nasiruddin Khan	1,822	1.04	
NOTA	None of the above	1,430	0.82	−0.09
Majority		16,789	9.63	−3.53
Turnout		174,458	78.14	+5.59
INC gain from BJP		Swing		

=== 2018 ===
2018 Rajasthan Legislative Assembly election: Dholpur
Party	Candidate	Votes	%	±%
BJP	Shobha Rani Kushwaha	67,349	45.79	
INC	Dr. Shiv Charan Singh Kushawah	47,989	32.63	
BSP	Kishan Chand Sharma	21,253	14.45	
Independent	Chand Prakash Sharma Urf C.P. Sharma	6,244	4.24	
NOTA	None of the above	1,335	0.91	
Majority		19,360	13.16	
Turnout		147,092	72.55	
BJP hold		Swing		

=== 2017 ===
By-election, 2017: Dholpur
Party	Candidate	Votes	%	±%
BJP	Shobha Rani Kushwaha	91,548	62.19	
INC	Banwari Lal Sharma	52,875	35.92	
Independent	Harvilash Jatav	919	0.62	
Majority		38,673	26.09	
Turnout		1,48,250	77.20	
BJP gain from BSP		Swing		

=== 2013 ===
2013 Rajasthan Legislative Assembly election: Dholpur
Party	Candidate	Votes	%	±%
BSP	B L Kushwah	49,892	37.86	
INC	Banwari Lal Sharma	40,683	30.87	
BJP	Abdul Sagir Khan	35,351	26.89	
Majority		9,209	6.99	
Turnout		1,31,990	81.34	
BSP gain from BJP		Swing		

=== 1985 ===
1985 Rajasthan Legislative Assembly election: Dholpur
Party	Candidate	Votes	%	±%
BJP	Vasundhara Raje	49,174	62.51	
INC	Banwari Lal	26,494	33.68	
Independent	Hukam Singh	1,225	1.56	
ICJ	Munna	905	1.15	
Independent	Shyam Lal	522	0.66	
Independent	Latoori	345	0.44	
Majority		22,680	28.83	
Turnout		78,665	72.07	
BJP gain from INC		Swing		

== See also ==
- List of constituencies of the Rajasthan Legislative Assembly
- Dholpur district
