= Bari, Rajasthan Assembly constituency =

Legislative Assembly constituency in Rajasthan State, India

Coordinates: 26.65°N 77.62°E

Bari
- Constituency No. 78 for the Rajasthan Legislative Assembly

Constituency details
- Country: India
- Region: North India
- State: Rajasthan
- District: Dholpur
- Lok Sabha constituency: Karauli-Dholpur
- Established: 1972
- Total electors: 237,355
- Reservation: None

Member of Legislative Assembly
- 16th Rajasthan Legislative Assembly
- Incumbent Jaswant Singh Gurjar
- Party: SHS
- Alliance: NDA
- Elected year: 2023

Bari Assembly constituency is one of the 200 Legislative Assembly constituencies of Rajasthan state in India.

It is part of Dholpur district. As of 2023, its representative is Jaswant Singh Gurjar of Shiv Sena.

== Members of the Legislative Assembly ==
Election	Name	Party
1952	Mangal Singh	Indian National Congress
1952	Hansraj	Indian National Congress
1957	Subedar Singh	Indian National Congress
1962	Raghubir Singh	Independent politician
1967	Balwant	Indian National Congress
1972	Ramlal	Independent politician
1977	Salig Ram	Indian National Congress
1980	Shiv Singh Chauhan	Independent politician
1985	Daljeet Singh	Indian National Congress
1990	Daljeet Singh	Indian National Congress
1993	Daljeet Singh	Indian National Congress
1998	Jaswant Singh Gurjar	Bharatiya Janata Party
2003	Daljeet Singh	Indian National Congress
2008	Girraj Singh Malinga	Bahujan Samaj Party
2013	Girraj Singh Malinga	Indian National Congress
2018	Girraj Singh Malinga	Indian National Congress
2023	Jaswant Singh Gurjar	Bahujan Samaj Party
2023	Jaswant Singh Gurjar	Shiv Sena

== Election results ==
=== 2023 ===
2023 Rajasthan Legislative Assembly election: Bari
Party	Candidate	Votes	%	±%
BSP	Jaswant Singh Gurjar	106,060	52.62	+32.37
BJP	Girraj Singh Malinga	78,636	39.01	+5.97
INC	Prashant Singh Parmar	11,601	5.76	−38.12
NOTA	None of the above	941	0.47	−0.46
Majority		27,424	13.61	+2.77
Turnout		201,567	84.92	−0.82
BSP gain from INC		Swing		

=== 2018 ===
Rajasthan Legislative Assembly Election, 2018: Bari
Party	Candidate	Votes	%	±%
INC	Girraj Singh Malinga	79,712	43.88	
BJP	Jaswant Singh Gurjar	60,029	33.04	
BSP	Ramhet	36,798	20.25	
NOTA	None of the above	1,698	0.93	
Majority		19,683	10.84	
Turnout		181,679	85.74	

== See also ==
- List of constituencies of the Rajasthan Legislative Assembly
- Dholpur district
