= Khiladi Lal Bairwa =

Indian politician

Member of Rajasthan Legislative Assembly
- In office 2018–2023
- Preceded by: Rani Silautia
- Succeeded by: Sanjay Kumar Jatav
- Constituency: Baseri

Member of parliament, 15th Lok Sabha
- In office May 2009 – May 2014
- Succeeded by: Manoj Rajoria
- Constituency: Karauli–Dholpur

Chairman of Rajasthan Scheduled Castes Commission
- In office 19 February 2022 – 1 November 2023

Personal details
- Born: 5 January 1964 (age 62) Salempur, Karauli district, Rajasthan
- Party: Indian National Congress (till 2023; since November 2026)
- Other political affiliations: Bharatiya Janata Party (March 2024-July 2024)
- Spouse: Saroopi Devi
- Children: 1 son and 3 daughters
- Education: Hindi Vishwavidyalaya, Allahabad
- Profession: Businessperson, politician

Khiladi Lal Bairwa (born 5 January 1964) is an Indian politician & former member of the Rajasthan Legislative Assembly from Baseri Assembly constituency and former chairman of the Rajasthan Scheduled Castes Commission. He was a member of parliament in the 15th Lok Sabha representing the Karauli–Dholpur constituency of Rajasthan and a member of the Bhartiya Janta Party (Till July 2024 resignation).

== Early life and education ==
Bairwa was born in Salempur, Karauli district in the state of Rajasthan. He is a graduate and received a BA degree from the Hindi Vishwavidyalaya in Allahabad (Uttar Pradesh). He is a businessperson.

== Political career ==
Bairwa has been in active politics since the early 2000s band was elected to parliament in 2009. He was the first MP to be elected from the Karauli–Dholpur constituency after it was created in 2008 as a part of the implementation of delimitation of parliamentary constituencies based on the recommendations of the Delimitation Commission of India.

He was a member of two committees.

=== Controversy ===
In December 2013, an Indian news website, Cobrapost, claimed that it conducted a sting operation in which 11 Indian MPs, for money, were willing to write recommendation letters and to lobby the Ministry of Petroleum and Natural Gas to favour a (fictitious) foreign oil company. The sting operation was code-named Operation Falcon Claw. Bairwa was one of the accused politicians. Allegedly, he had asked for ₹5 million (US$52,000) for writing a recommendation letter.

== Posts held ==
From	To	Position
2009	2014	Member, 15th Lok Sabha
2009	2014	Member, Committee on Railways
2009	2014	Member, Committee on Petitions

== See also ==
- Politics of India
- Parliament of India
- Government of India
