= Tagawali =

- Village
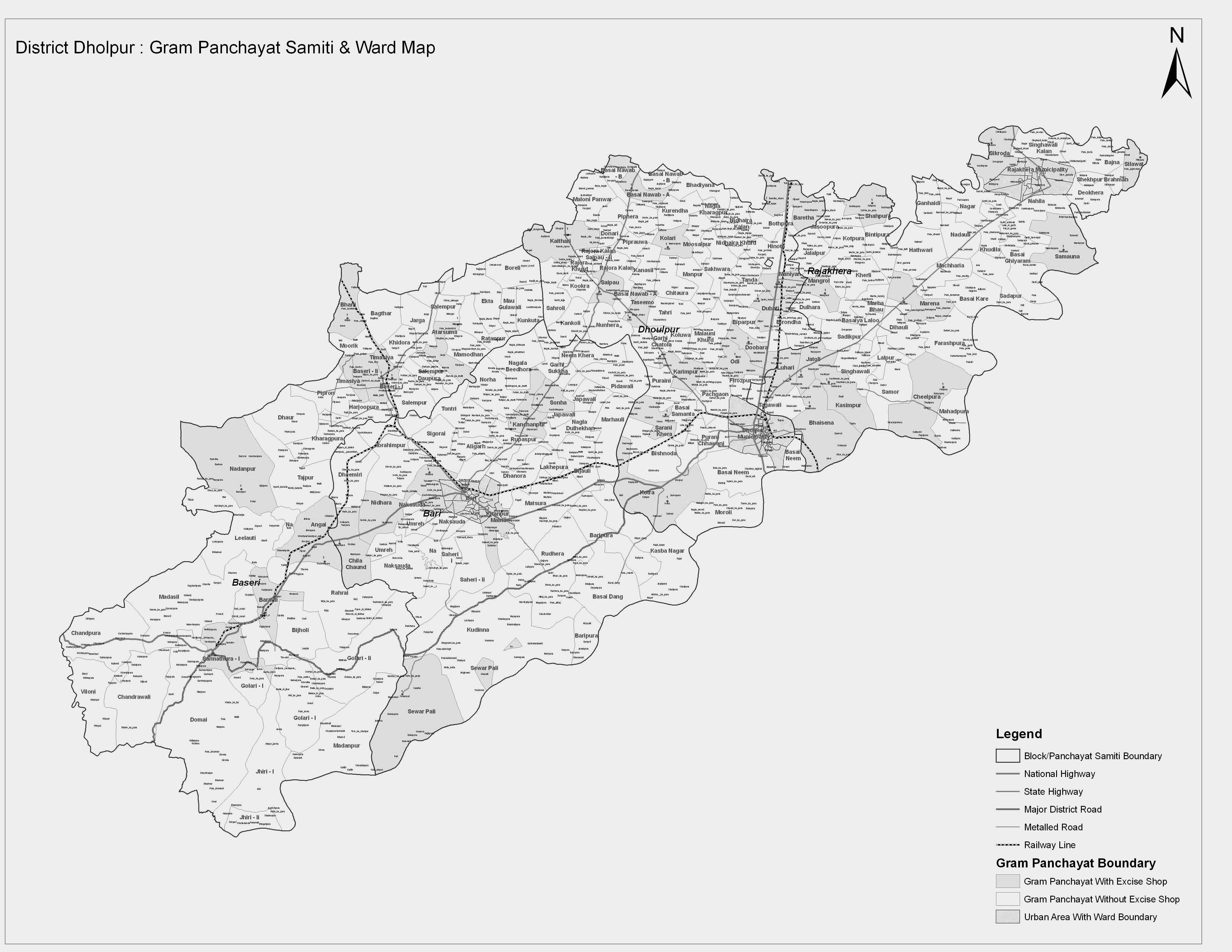
- Tagawali in Dholpur Map
- Interactive map of Tagawali
- Coordinates: 26°42′35″N 77°54′28″E
- Country: India
- State: Rajasthan
- District: Dholpur

Population (2011)
  - Total: 2,090

Tagawali is a village in Rajakhera Mandal (Panchayat Samiti), Dholpur district, Rajasthan state, India. Tagawali is 2 km far from its District Main City Dholpur and 300 km far from its State capital Jaipur. It is the nearest village to Dholpur Headquarters. Tagawali Pin Code is 328001 and its Gram Panchayat and Branch Post Office name is Tagawali.

== History ==
Tagawali was established by land owners belonging to the "Tagoliya" gotra of Lodhi Rajput community about 300 years ago. As the village's founders were Tagoliya, it became known as Tagawali.

== Geography ==
The village is located at 26°42'N & 77°54'E. It has an elevation of 175 metres. It is 1.0 km far from Dholpur Junction, 1.0 km far from Govt. P.G.College and 3.0 km from Dholpur Central Bus Stand.

== Demographics ==
According to the 2011 India census, Tagawali had a population of 2,090 with 343 households. 90% of the population belongs to lodha Rajput class. Males constitute 55% of the population and females 45%. It has an average literacy rate of 60%.

== Economy ==
The economy of Tagawali is primarily agricultural. In Tagawali there is a total of 29 government employees. One RES (Lecturer- gazetted officer), 10 are in the education department, 6 are in the medical department, 8 are in RECL factory and 4 are in electrical department. A Sewage Treatment Plant of 10 MLD capacity is also under construction, where waste water coming from city will be purified.
