= Sapotra Assembly constituency =

Assembly constituency in Rajasthan

Coordinates: 26.30°N 76.75°E

Sapotra
- Constituency No. 84 for the Rajasthan Legislative Assembly

Constituency details
- Country: India
- Region: North India
- State: Rajasthan
- District: Karauli
- Lok Sabha constituency: Karauli–Dholpur
- Established: 1951
- Total electors: 2,49,633 (2018)
- Reservation: ST

Member of Legislative Assembly
- 16th Rajasthan Legislative Assembly
- Incumbent Hansraj Meena
- Party: Bhartiya Janta Party
- Elected year: 2023

Sapotra Assembly constituency is a constituency of the Rajasthan Legislative Assembly covering the Sapotra Tehsil in the Karauli district of Rajasthan, India.

Sapotra is one of eight assembly constituencies in the Karauli–Dholpur (Lok Sabha constituency). Currently this seat is represented by Indian National Congress candidate Ramesh Chand Meena, who won in last assembly election of 2018 Rajasthan Legislative Assembly election by defeating Bharatiya Janta Party candidate Golma Devi Meena by a margin of 14,104 votes.

== Geographical scope ==
The constituency comprises parts of Sapotra Tehsil, Mandrail Tehsil, Karauli Tehsil (Partly) (1) ILRC Maholi (2) ILRC Kailadevi

== Members of the Legislative Assembly ==
| Election | Member | Party |
|---|---|---|
| 1951 | Dharam Chand | Akhil Bharatiya Ram Rajya Parishad |
Constituency abolished
| 1967 | Ram Kumar | Bharatiya Jana Sangh |
| 1972 | Ram Kumar | Indian National Congress |
| 1977 | Rangji Meena | Janata Party |
| 1980 | Rangji Meena | Bharatiya Janata Party |
| 1985 | Rishikesh | Indian National Congress |
| 1990 | Prabhu Lal Patel | Indian National Congress |
| 1993 | Rangji Meena | Bharatiya Janata Party |
| 1998 | Kamala | Indian National Congress |
| 2003 | Sukh Lal | Bharatiya Janata Party |
| 2008 | Ramesh Chand Meena | Bahujan Samaj Party |
| 2013 | Ramesh Chand Meena | Indian National Congress |
| 2018 | Ramesh Chand Meena | Indian National Congress |
| 2023 | Hansraj Meena | Bharatiya Janata Party |

== Election results ==
=== 2023 ===
2023 Rajasthan Legislative Assembly election: Sapotra
| Party | Candidate | Votes | % | ±% |
|---|---|---|---|---|
| BJP | Hansraj Meena | 111,385 | 56.24 | +19.76 |
| INC | Ramesh Chand Meena | 67,551 | 34.11 | −10.63 |
| BSP | Vijay Kumar Urf Kallu | 11,304 | 5.71 | −7.66 |
| NOTA | None of the above | 1,634 | 0.83 | −0.49 |
| Majority | | 43,834 | 22.13 | +13.87 |
| Turnout | | 198,042 | 72.01 | +3.6 |
| BJP gain from INC | | Swing | | |

=== 2018 ===
In 2018, Sapotra legislative assembly constituency had total 2,49,633 electors. Total number of valid vote was 1,70,763. Indian National Congress candidate Ramesh Chand Meena won and became MLA from this seat third time continuously. He secured total 76,399 votes. Bharatiya Janata Party candidate Golma Devi Meena stood second with total 62,295 votes. He lost by 14,104 votes.

2018 Rajasthan Legislative Assembly election: Sapotra
| Party | Candidate | Votes | % | ±% |
|---|---|---|---|---|
| INC | Ramesh Chand Meena | 76,399 | 44.74 | |
| BJP | Golma Devi Meena | 62,295 | 36.48 | |
| BSP | Hansraj Meena | 22,831 | 13.37 | |
| API | Jagdish | 2,063 | 1.21 | |
| NOTA | None of the above | 2,260 | 1.32 | |
| Majority | | 14,104 | 8.26 | |
| Turnout | | 170,763 | 68.41 | |
| INC hold | | Swing | ▲7.91 | |

=== 2013 ===
In 2013, Sapotra legislative assembly constituency had total 2,13,158 electors. Total number of valid vote was 1,42,681. Indian National Congress candidate Ramesh Chand Meena won and became MLA from this seat. He secured total 52,555 votes. Bharatiya Janata Party candidate Rishikesh stood second with total 46,323 votes. He lost by 6,232 votes.

2013 Rajasthan Legislative Assembly election: Sapotra
| Party | Candidate | Votes | % | ±% |
|---|---|---|---|---|
| INC | Ramesh Chand Meena | 52,555 | 36.83 | ▲11.37 |
| BJP | Rishikesh | 46,323 | 32.47 | ▲11.01 |
| NPP | Vijaylaxmi Meena | 23,447 | 16.43 | ▲16.43 |
| BSP | Jaldhari | 9,079 | 6.36 | ▼26.28 |
| | Remaining 4 Candidates | 6,644 | 4.57 | Steady |
| NOTA | None Of The Above | 4,633 | 3.25 | ▲3.25 |
| Majority | | 6,232 | 4.36 | ▼2.82 |
| Turnout | | 1,42,681 | 66.94 | ▲3.46 |
| INC gain from BSP | | Swing | ▲4.19 | |

=== 2008 ===
In 2008, Sapotra legislative assembly constituency had total 1,82,827 electors. Total number of valid vote was 1,16,062. Bahujan Samaj Party candidate Ramesh Chand Meena won and became MLA from this seat. He secured total 37,878 votes. Indian National Congress candidate Mukhraj stood second with total 29,549 votes. He lost by 8,329 votes.

2008 Rajasthan Legislative Assembly election: Sapotra
| Party | Candidate | Votes | % | ±% |
|---|---|---|---|---|
| BSP | Ramesh Chand Meena | 37,878 | 32.64 | Steady |
| INC | Mukhraj | 29,549 | 25.46 | Steady |
| BJP | Shakuntala | 24,912 | 21.46 | Steady |
| Independent | Brij Lal Meena | 9,837 | 8.48 | Steady |
| | Remaining 9 Candidates | 13,886 | 11.96 | Steady |
| Majority | | 8,329 | 7.18 | Steady |
| Turnout | | 1,16,062 | 63.48 | Steady |
| BSP gain from BJP | | Swing | Steady | |
