= Bhajan Lal Jatav =

Indian politician

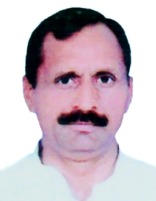
- Jatav in 2021

Member of Parliament, Lok Sabha
- Incumbent
- Assumed office 4 June 2024
- Preceded by: Manoj Rajoria
- Constituency: Karauli–Dholpur

Cabinet Minister, Government of Rajasthan
- In office 21 November 2021 – 3 December 2023
- Governor: Kalraj Mishra
- Chief Minister: Ashok Gahlot
- Ministry and Departments: Public Works Department (PWD)
- Preceded by: Sachin Pilot
- Succeeded by: Diya Kumari

Minister of State, Government of Rajasthan
- In office 24 December 2018 – 20 November 2021
- Governor: Kalyan Singh; Kalraj Mishra
- Chief Minister: Ashok Gahlot
- Ministry and Departments: List: * Home Defense & Civil Defense (I/C); Printing & Stationery (I/C); Agriculture; Animal Husbandry; Fisheries
- Preceded by: Gulab Chand Kataria
- Succeeded by: Rajendra Singh Gudha

Chairperson of RSRDC Corporation
- In office 7 January 2022 – 3 December 2023
- Preceded by: Rajesh Yadav
- Succeeded by: Diya Kumari

Member of the Rajasthan Legislative Assembly
- In office 11 December 2018 – 3 December 2023
- Preceded by: Self
- Succeeded by: Bahadur Singh Koli
- In office 16 September 2014 – 11 December 2018
- Preceded by: Bahadur Singh Koli
- Succeeded by: Self
- Constituency: Weir

Personal details
- Born: 12 October 1968 (age 57) Jhalatala, Weir Bharatpur, Rajasthan
- Party: Indian National Congress
- Spouse: Saroopi Devi Jatav (m. 1986)
- Occupation: Politician

Bhajan Lal Jatav (born 12 October 1968; Hindi pronunciation: [bʱəd͡ʒən̪.laːl d͡ʒaːʈəʋ]) is an Indian politician. He is currently serving Member of Parliament, 18th Lok Sabha from Karauli–Dholpur since 2024. He served as Minister of Public Works Department in the Government of Rajasthan. He was Minister of State as Home Defense and Civil Defense Department (I/C) in Government of Rajasthan. He was a Member of the 14th and 15th Rajasthan Legislative Assembly from Weir Assembly constituency. He served as Chairman of RSRDC (Rajasthan State Road Development and Construction Corporation). He is a Member of the Indian National Congress.

== Early life and education ==
Bhajan Lal Jatav was born on 12 October 1968 in Jhalatala village, Weir tehsil, Bharatpur district, Rajasthan. He completed his education up to the Higher Secondary level before entering public life.

== Political career ==
Jatav was elected to the Rajasthan Legislative Assembly from the Weir constituency in 2014 and was re-elected in 2018. During the Ashok Gehlot government, he served as Minister of State (Independent Charge) for Home Defence and Civil Defence, Printing and Stationery, while also holding responsibility for Agriculture, Animal Husbandry and Fisheries departments.

On 21 November 2021, he was inducted into the Rajasthan Cabinet as the Cabinet Minister for the Public Works Department (PWD). He also served as Chairman of the Rajasthan State Road Development and Construction Corporation (RSRDC).

In the 2024 Indian general election, Jatav was elected to the 18th Lok Sabha from the Karauli–Dholpur (SC) constituency, defeating the incumbent Bharatiya Janata Party candidate Manoj Rajoria. Following his election, he was nominated to the Parliamentary Standing Committee on Rural Development and Panchayati Raj.

== Personal life ==
Bhajan Lal Jatav is married and is associated with social and political activities in Rajasthan. He belongs to the Scheduled Caste community and has represented reserved constituencies in both the Rajasthan Legislative Assembly and the Lok Sabha.

== Posts held ==
#	From	To	Position	Comments
01	2014	2018	Member of 14th Rajasthan Legislative Assembly	
02	2014	2018	Member, Scheduled Caste Welfare Committee, Rajasthan Legislative Assembly	
03	2018	2023	Member of 15th Rajasthan Legislative Assembly	
04	2018	2021	Minister of State; Government of Rajasthan: Home Defense & Civil Defense (I/C); Printing & Stationery (I/C); Agriculture; Animal Husbandry; Fisheries	
05	2021	2023	Cabinet Minister; Government of Rajasthan: Public Works Department (PWD)	
06	2022	2023	Chairman Of RSRDC Corporation Government of Rajasthan	
07	2024	Incumbent	Member of Parliament, 18th Lok Sabha	
08	26 September 2024	Incumbent	Member, Committee on Rural Development and Panchayati Raj	
