= Darshan Singh Gurjar =

Indian politician (born 1969)

Member of the 16th Rajasthan Legislative Assembly
- Incumbent
- Assumed office 3 December 2023
- Preceded by: Lakhan Singh Meena

Member of the 14th Rajasthan Legislative Assembly
- In office 11 December 2013 – 10 December 2018
- Preceded by: Rohini Kumari
- Succeeded by: Lakhan Singh Meena
- Constituency: Karauli

Personal details
- Born: 15 June 1969 (age 57) Sundarpura Near Narsingh bhagwan tample, [tehsil-Karauli], District-Karuali, Rajasthan
- Party: Bhartiya Janta Party
- Other political affiliations: Indian National Congress
- Spouse: Kamlesh Devi
- Children: 3
- Occupation: Politician
- Profession: Agriculture

Shri Darshan Singh Gurjar (June 15, 1969) is an Indian politician currently serving as a member of the 16th Rajasthan Assembly, representing the Karauli constituency. He is a member of the Bharatiya Janata Party. He previously served as a member of the 14th Rajasthan Assembly from the same constituency as a candidate of the Indian National Congress.
