= Ghanshyam Mahar =

Indian politician

Member of Rajasthan Legislative Assembly
- Incumbent
- Assumed office 3 December 2023
- Preceded by: Prithviraj Meena
- Constituency: Todabhim
- In office 12 December 2013 – 11 December 2018
- Preceded by: Kirodi Lal Meena
- Succeeded by: Prithviraj Meena
- Constituency: Todabhim

Personal details
- Born: 5 December 1962 (age 63)
- Party: Indian National Congress
- Profession: Politician

Ghanshyam Mahar (born 5 December 1962) is an Indian politician from Rajasthan, currently serving as a Member of the Rajasthan Legislative Assembly representing the Todabhim constituency. He is affiliated with the Indian National Congress and serves as Vice President of the Rajasthan Pradesh Congress Committee. He previously served in the Rajasthan Legislative Assembly from 2013 to 2018 and is a member of the All India Congress Committee (AICC).

== Political career ==
In the 2013 Rajasthan Legislative Assembly election, Ghanshyam Mahar contested the Todabhim constituency, defeating his opponent Prithviraj Meena. Mahar received 50,955 votes, which accounted for 35.5% of the total vote share, securing a victory.

In the 2023 Rajasthan Legislative Assembly election, Mahar was re-elected from Todabhim. This time, he garnered 97,389 votes, which constituted 54.08% of the vote share, defeating Ramnivas Meena of the Bharatiya Janata Party, who secured 68,528 votes (38.05%).

== Electoral performance ==
Election results
Year	Constituency	Candidate (Party)	Votes	%	Opponent (Party)	Opponent Votes	Opponent %	Result	Ref
2023	Todabhim	Ghanshyam Mahar (INC)	97,389	54.08	Ramnivas Meena (BJP)	68,528	38.05	Won	Times of India
2013	Todabhim	Ghanshyam Mahar (INC)	50,955	35.50	Prithviraj Meena (BJP)	43,946	30.62	Won	Times of India
