= Manoj Rajoria =

Indian politician

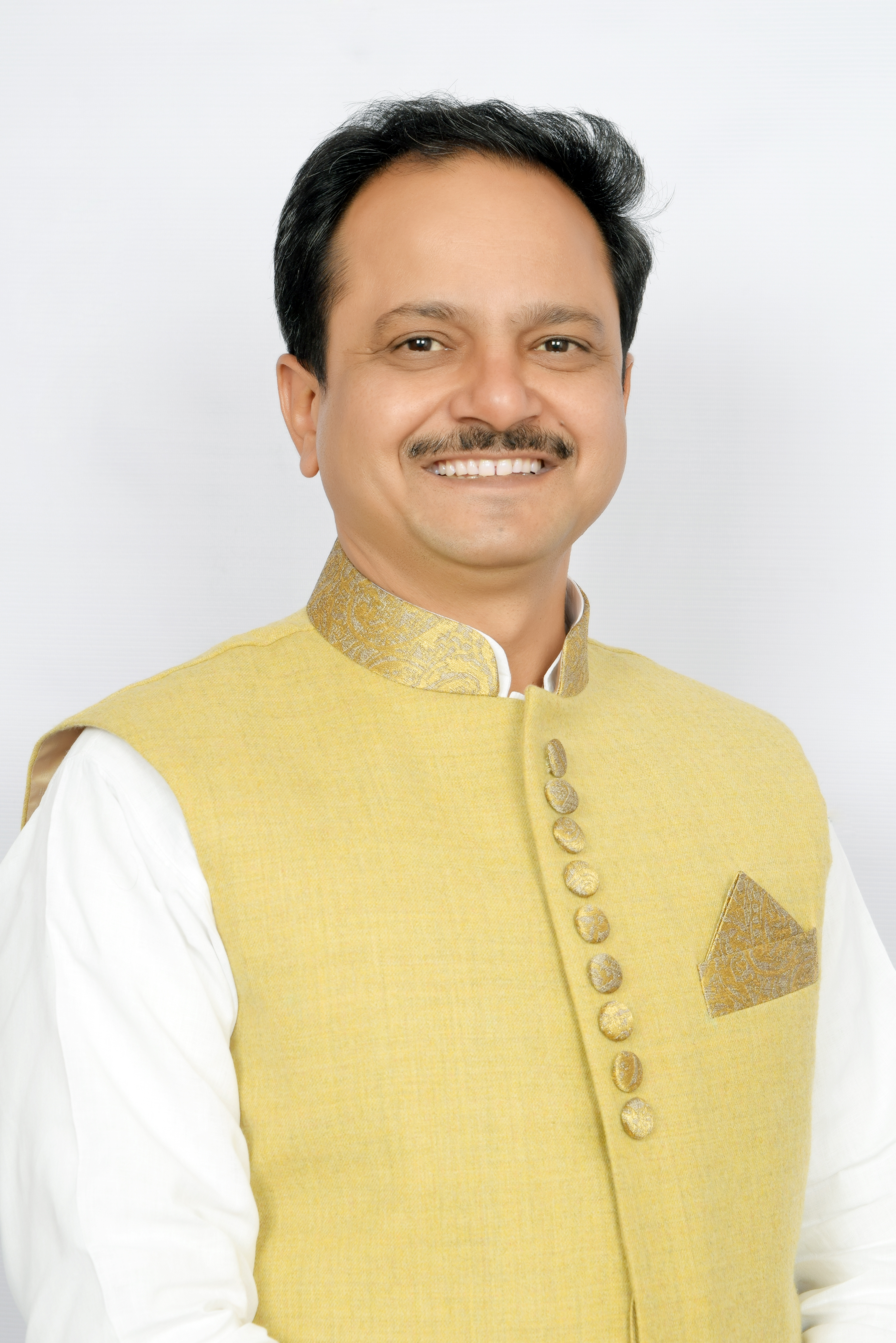

Member of Parliament in Lok Sabha
- In office September 2014 – 4 June 2024
- Preceded by: Khiladi Lal Bairwa
- Succeeded by: Bhajan Lal Jatav
- Constituency: Karauli-Dholpur

Personal details
- Born: 19 December 1969 (age 56) Jaipur, Rajasthan, India
- Party: Bharatiya Janata Party
- Spouse: Smt. Sunita Rajoria
- Children: 2
- Occupation: Medical Practitioner
- As of 17 December, 2016

Manoj Rajoria (born 19 December 1969) is an Indian politician and former member of parliament to the 16th Lok Sabha & 17th Lok Sabha from Karauli-Dholpur (Lok Sabha constituency), Rajasthan. He won the 2014 Indian general election as a Bharatiya Janata Party candidate.

== Political career ==
He won the Indian General Election, 2014 as a Bhartiya Janta Party (BJP) candidate and became Member of Parliament of the 16th Lok Sabha from Karuali – Dholpur (Lok Sabha Constituency), Rajasthan.
