= Hansraj Meena =

Indian politician

Member of the Rajasthan Legislative Assembly
- Incumbent
- Assumed office 3 December 2023
- Preceded by: Ramesh Chand Meena
- Constituency: Sapotra

Personal details
- Born: 10 February 1984 (age 42) Baloti, Sapotra, Karauli, Rajasthan
- Party: Bhartiya Janta Party
- Children: 3
- Education: B.A. & B.E.d.
- Alma mater: University of Kota
- Occupation: MLA

Hansraj Meena (born 10 February 1984) is an Indian politician currently serving as the 16th Member of the Rajasthan Legislative Assembly from Sapotra. He is Member of the Bhartiya Janta Party.
