= Bari, India =

Bari
- city
- Location in Rajasthan, India Bari (India)
- Coordinates: 26.63°N 77.62°E
- Country: India
- State: Rajasthan
- District: Dholpur
- Elevation: 463 m (1,519 ft)

Population (2014)
  - Total: 62,721

Languages
  - Official: Hindi
- Time zone: UTC+5:30 (IST)
- PIN: 328021
- ISO 3166 code: RJ-IN
- Vehicle registration: RJ-

Bari is a city and an Indian municipality in Dholpur district in the state of Rajasthan.

== Demographics ==
The Bari Municipality has population of 62,721 of which 33,673 are males while 29,048 are females as per report released by Census India 2011. The literacy rate of Bari city is 70.75% higher than the state average of 66.11%. In Bari, male literacy is around 79.38% while the female literacy rate is 60.79%. The population of children aged 0-6 is 10102 which is 16.11% of total population of Bari (M). In Bari Municipality, the female sex ratio is 863 against state average of 928. Moreover, the child sex ratio in Bari is around 847 compared to Rajasthan state average of 888. there is only one girls school for senior education. Out of total population, 18,730 were engaged in work or business activity. Of this 16,057 were males while 2,673 were females. In census survey, worker is defined as person who does business, job, service, and cultivator and labour activity. Of total 18730 working population, 88.05% were engaged in Main Work while 11.95% of total workers were engaged in Marginal Work.

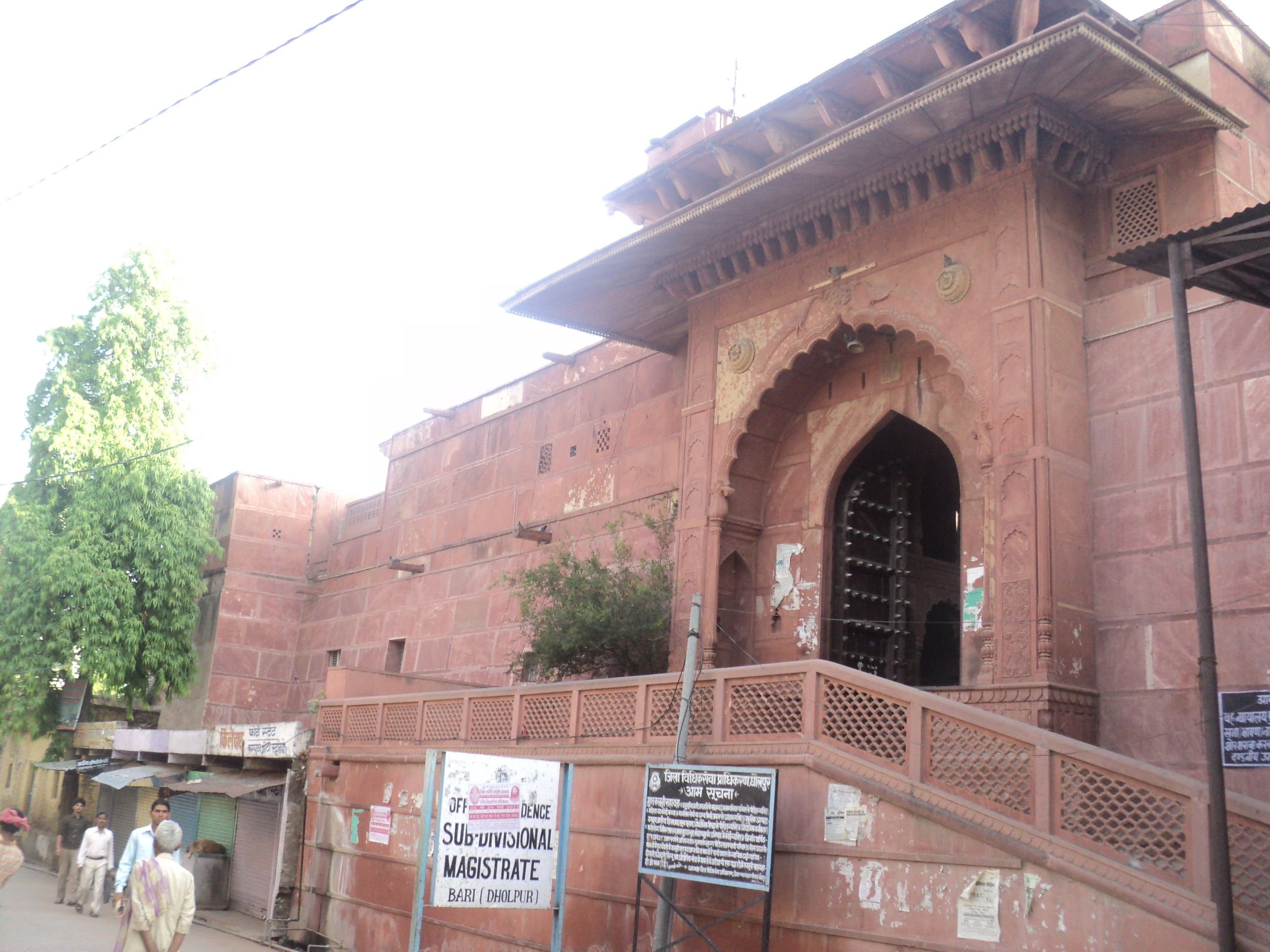
Fort Bari, बाड़ी का किला

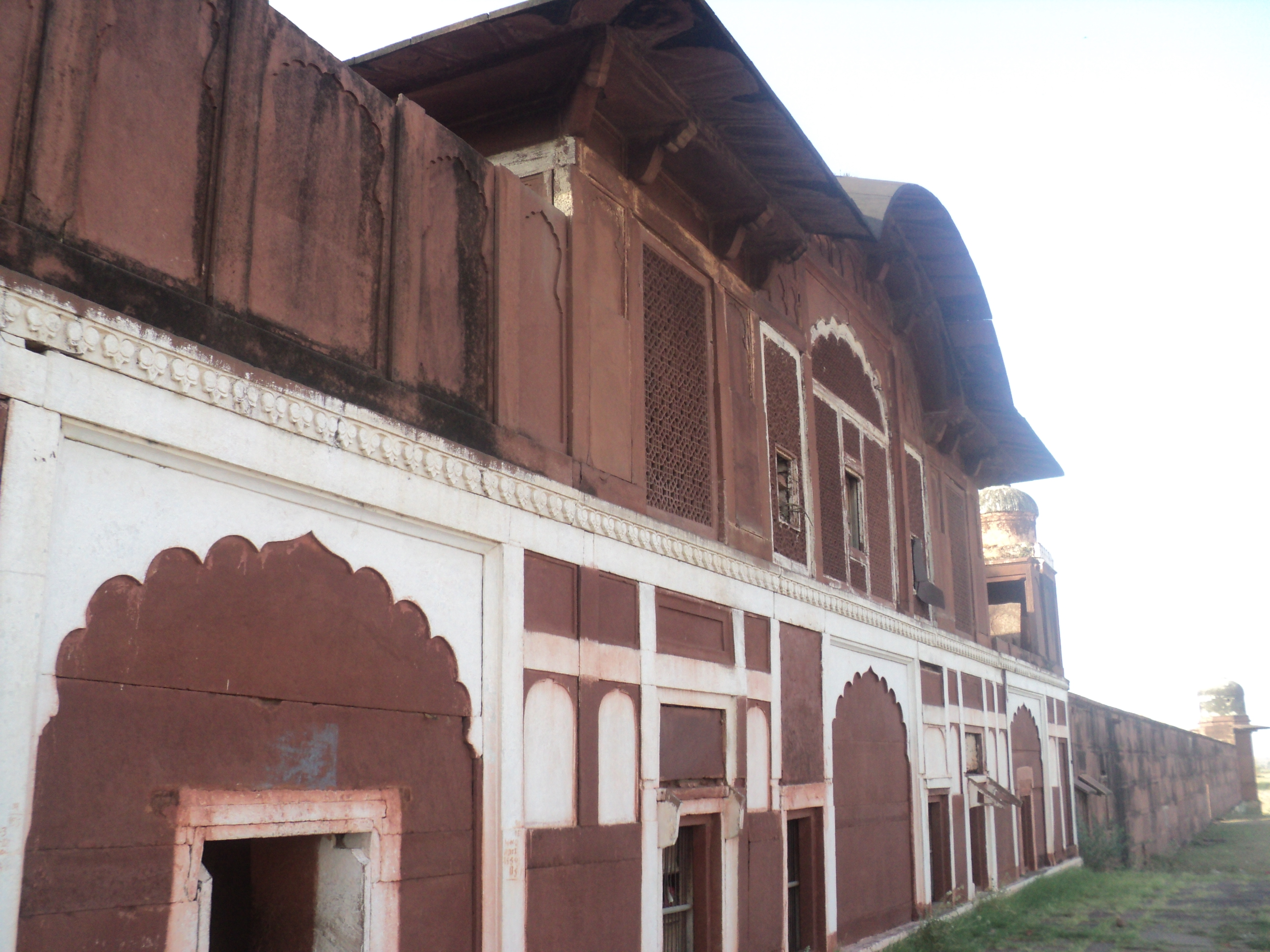
Khanpur Mahal

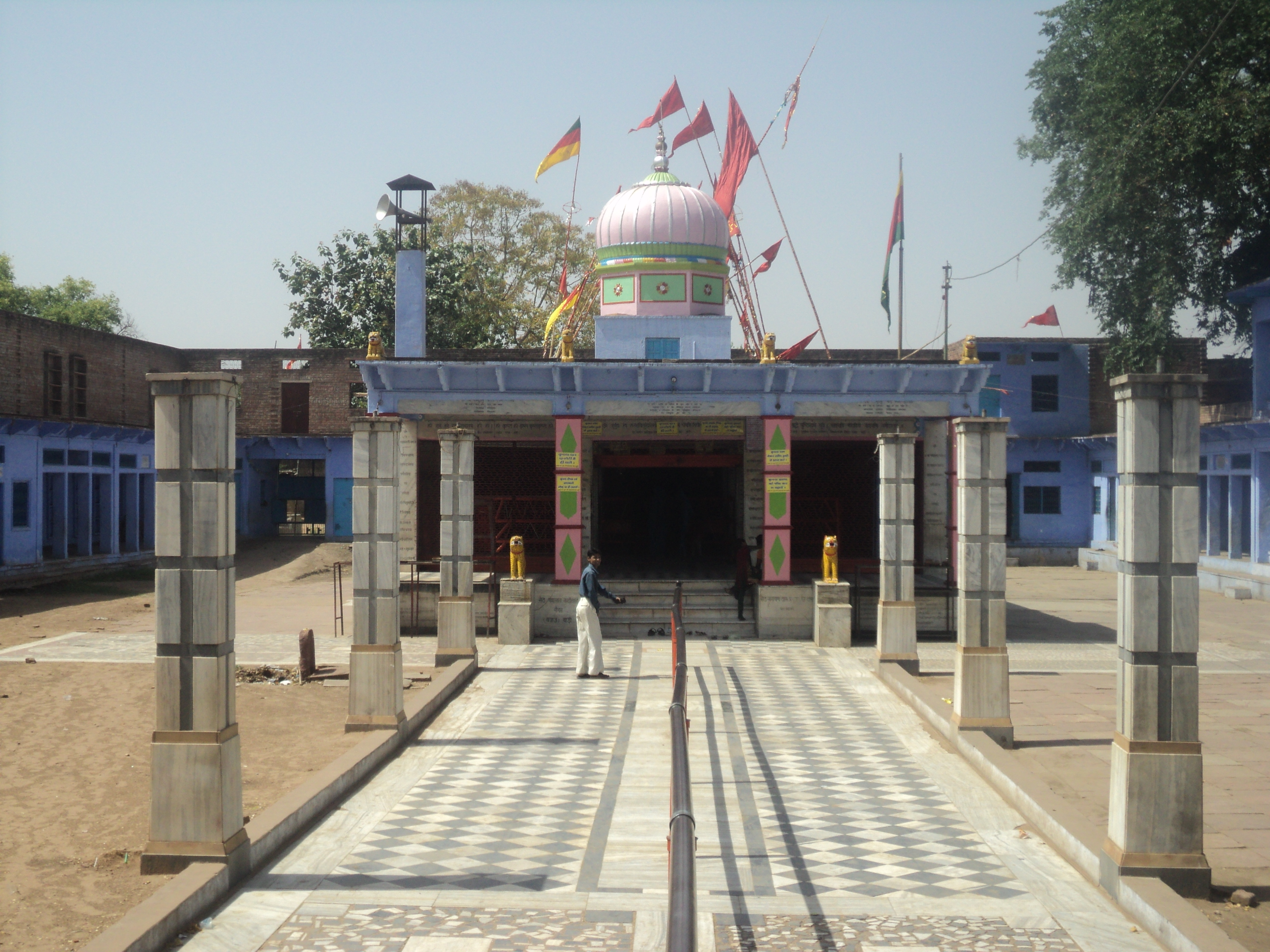
Kaila Mata temple Bari

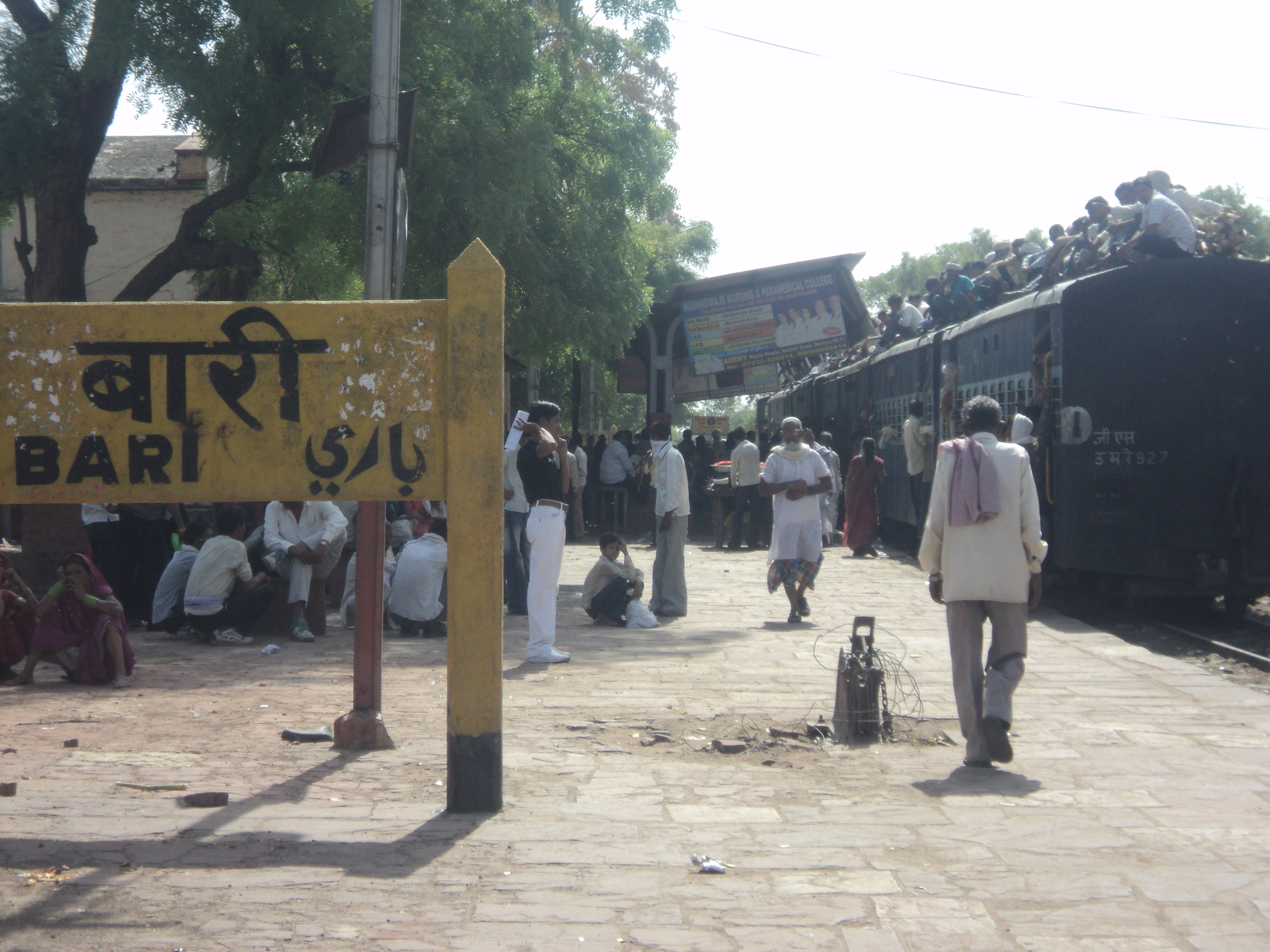
Railway station
