= Shanti Pahadia =

Indian politician (1934–2021)

Member of Parliament, Rajya Sabha
- In office 1984–1990
- Constituency: Rajasthan

Personal details
- Born: 1 August 1934
- Died: 23 May 2021 (aged 86)
- Party: Indian National Congress
- Spouse: Jagannath Pahadia

Shanti Pahadia (1 August 1934 – 23 May 2021) was an Indian politician.

== Biography ==
She was a Member of Parliament, representing Rajasthan in the Rajya Sabha the upper house of India's Parliament as a member of the Indian National Congress.

Pahadia died from COVID-19, four days after her husband died from the virus.
