= Rani Silautia =

Indian politician

Rani Silotia

Member of the Rajasthan Legislative Assembly
- In office 2013–2018
- Succeeded by: Khiladi Lal Bairwa
- Constituency: Baseri

Personal details
- Born: 1 February 1970 (age 56) Jaura, Morena
- Party: Bharatiya Janata Party
- Occupation: Politician

Rani Silautia is an Indian politician from the Bharatiya Janata Party and a member of the Rajasthan Legislative Assembly representing the Baseri Vidhan Sabha constituency of Rajasthan.
