= Jagannath Pahadia =

9th Chief Minister of Rajasthan

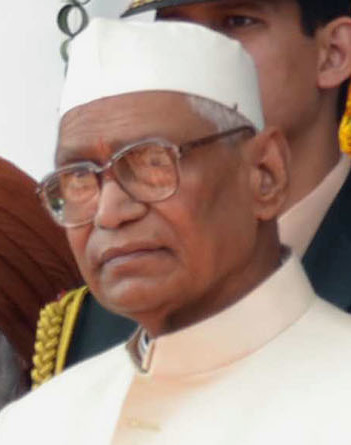

Governor of Haryana
- In office 27 July 2009 – 26 July 2014
- Chief Minister: Bhupinder Singh Hooda
- Preceded by: A. R. Kidwai
- Succeeded by: Kaptan Singh Solanki

Governor of Bihar
- In office 3 March 1989 – 2 February 1990
- Chief Minister: Satyendra Narayan Sinha; Jagannath Mishra
- Preceded by: R. D. Pradhan
- Succeeded by: Mohammad Yunus Saleem

9th Chief Minister of Rajasthan
- In office 6 June 1980 – 13 July 1981
- Preceded by: President's rule
- Succeeded by: Shiv Charan Mathur

Personal details
- Born: 15 January 1932 Bhusawar, Bharatpur State, British India
- Died: 19 May 2021 (aged 89) Gurugram, Haryana, India
- Party: Indian National Congress
- Spouse: Shanti Pahadia

Jagannath Pahadia (15 January 1932 – 19 May 2021) was an Indian politician and a leader of the Indian National Congress party. He was the former Chief Minister of Rajasthan, Governor of Haryana, and Governor of Bihar. He died on 19 May 2021 from COVID-19.

== Early life and education ==
He was born in Bhusawar city of the present-day Bharatpur district of Rajasthan state in a Dalit family on 15 January 1932 to Nathilal Pahadia and Chanda Devi. He held M.A., LL.B., M.S.J. College, Bharatpur, Maharaja College, Jaipur and Law College Rajasthan University. He was an Ambedkarite.

== Career ==
He was Chief Minister of Rajasthan state from 6 June 1980 to 14 July 1981 and was the first Dalit from Rajasthan to hold this position.

Pahadia served in the Rajasthan Legislative Assembly from 1980 to 1990 then 1998 till 2008.

He represented Sawai Madhopur (Lok Sabha constituency) in the 2nd Lok Sabha and Bayana constituency in Rajasthan in the 4th, 5th and 7th Lok Sabha. His wife Shanti Pahadia was also a member of Lok Sabha. He was governor of Bihar from 3 March 1989 to 2 February 1990. Later, he served and was appointed the governor of Haryana from 27 July 2009 to 26 July 2014.

Lok Sabha
Preceded by Manik Chand Jatav-vir	Member of Parliament for Sawai Madhopur; 1957 – 1962	Succeeded by Kesar Lal
Preceded by Tika Ram Paliwal	Member of Parliament for Bayana; 1967 – 1977	Succeeded by Shyam Sunder Lal
Preceded by Shyam Sunder Lal	Member of Parliament for Bayana; 1980 – 1984	Succeeded by Lala Ram Ken
Political offices
Preceded by President rule	Chief Minister of Rajasthan; 6 June 1980 - 13 July 1981	Succeeded by Shiv Charan Mathur
Preceded by R. D. Pradhan	Governor of Bihar; 3 March 1989 - 2 February 1990	Succeeded by Mohammad Yunus Saleem
Preceded by A. R. Kidwai	Governor of Haryana; 27 July 2009 - 26 July 2014	Succeeded by Kaptan Singh Solanki
