= Dholpur =

Dholpur Dhaulpur
- City
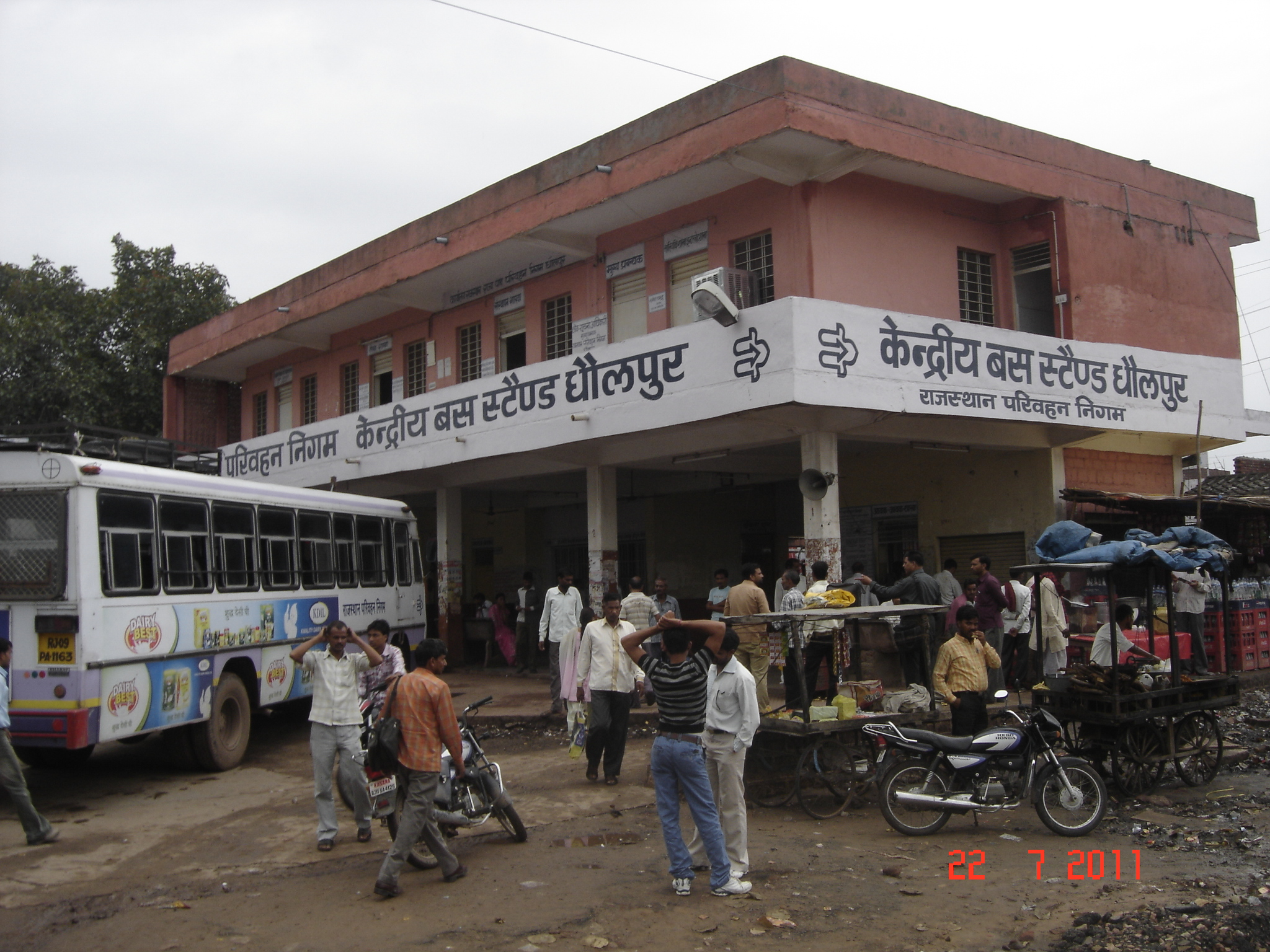
- Dholpur Bus Stand in Dholpur (Rajasthan)
- Nickname: Dang
- Location in Rajasthan, India
- Coordinates: 26°41′46.922″N 77°53′25.045″E
- Country: India
- State: Rajasthan
- District: Dholpur
- Founder: Dhaval Dev in 11th century

Area
  - City: 33.3 km^{2} (12.9 sq mi)
- Elevation: 177 m (581 ft)

Population (2021)
  - City: 246,489
  - Density: 7,400/km^{2} (19,200/sq mi)
  - Metro: 133,229

Languages
  - Official: Hindi, Rajasthani
- Time zone: UTC+5:30 (IST)
- PIN: 328001
- Telephone code: 05642
- Vehicle registration: RJ-11
- Sex ratio: 862 ♂/♀
- Website: dholpur.rajasthan.gov.in

Dholpur is a city in the Dholpur district in Rajasthan state of India. Dholpur is situated on the left bank of the Chambal river. The city is the administrative headquarters of Dholpur district. Dholpur was established by King Dhaval Dev of the Tomar dynasty of Delhi Tomaras of Delhi in 1004 AD by the name of Dhavalpuri, later with time it was changed to the present day name Dholpur.

Dholpur became a separate district in 1982 comprising Dholpur, Rajakhera, Saramathura, Bari and Baseri tehsils. Dholpur district is a part of Bharatpur Division/Commissionerate. It is bordered by Bharatpur district of Rajasthan to the North and Agra District of Uttar Pradesh to the north and north east, Morena District of Madhya Pradesh to the south, Karauli district to the west and Uttar Pradesh and Madhya Pradesh to the east. Dholpur is situated 33 km from Morena, 57 km from Agra and 77 km from Gwalior.

Dholpur is famous for its red stone and ancient temple. Also, Machkund temple and kund which is famous as "Tirthon ka Bhanja". Three famous shiv temples situated here are Mahakaal Shiv Temple, Mahadev Temple at the nearby Parvati river, and Bhooteshwar Mahadev Temple.

== Geography ==
The city of Dholpur (Dhaulpur) lies on the left (north) bank of the Chambal River at 26° 42' 0" North, 77° 54' 0" East, across the river, and provincial border, from Morena in Madhya Pradesh. It is located on old NH-3 and is a junction on the North Central Railway. The total area of Dholpur city is 33.3 square kilometres (12.9 sq mi).

== History ==
=== Rajput period (7th century) ===
There were several Rajput dynasties including Chauhans, Tomars, and Jadauns who ruled over Dholpur for a long period.

==== Chahamana (Chauhan) dynasty ====
The earliest Rajput dyanasty that ruled Dholpur region were the Chauhans in the early 7th and 8th century. The discovery of a stone inscription at Dholpur has brought into light the existence of a Chahamana dynasty at Dhavalapuri. The inscription mentions Chauhan Prince Chandamahasena who was the contemporary of Pratihara emperor Bhojadev. The inscription mentions conflicts of Chauhan Prince with invading Arab armies.

==== Jadaun dynasty ====
The Tomars lost sovereignty to Jadaun Rajputs of Karauli State. The fort at Dholpur was built by Dharmpal Jadaun in 1120 AD.

=== Mughal period ===
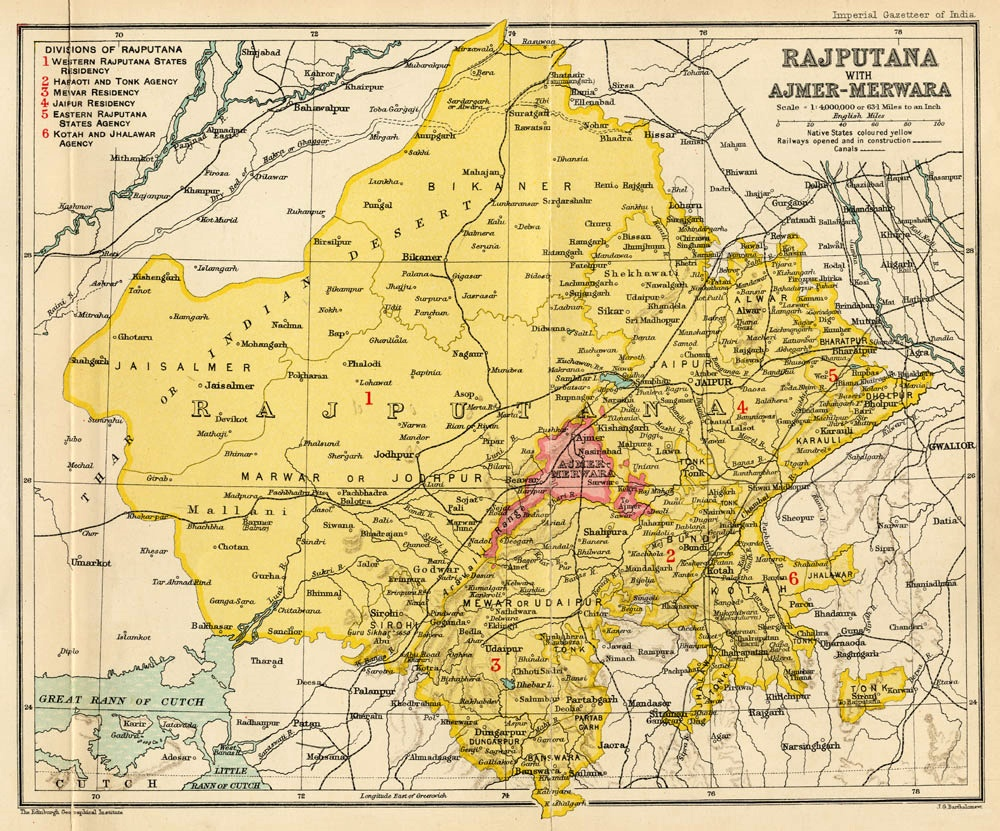
Dholpur State, part of the Rajputana Agency, 1909

After the battle of Panipat, Babar became the first Mughal ruler of Hindustan.

Dholpur was taken by Sikandar Lodi in 1491, who handed it to a Muslim governor in 1504. After the death of Ibrahim Lodi, many states declared themselves independent. Talai Khan became the ruler of Gwalior.

=== Jat period ===
After the Mughals, Dholpur was taken successively by the Jat ruler Maharaja Suraj Mal of Bharatpur;from period of 1705 to 1761 the fort was under Chauhan rajputs' sub-clan Bhadoriya and later regained by different rulers like Mirza Najaf Khan in 1775; by the Maratha Scindia ruler of Gwalior in 1782; and finally, by the British East India Company in 1803. It was restored by the British to the Scindias under the Treaty of Sarji Anjangaon, briefly, and was soon reoccupied by the British. In 1805, Dholpur came under the Jat ruler, Maharana Kirat Singh of Gohad, a princely state, a vassal of the British during the Raj.

According to the Babur Nama, Babur had a baori built in Dholpur on his last trip to Gwalior, to add to the charghar ("four-gardens") he had already had built there.

=== British rule and after ===
One of the few areas of Rajasthan which was in open revolt during the 1857 rebellion was led by a Zamindar who raised an army of three thousand to fight the British During British Raj, it was part of the Rajputana Agency, till the Independence of India. The former mansion of the ruler of the erstwhile Dholpur State, Kesarbagh palace, now houses the Dholpur Military School, while its official residence in New Delhi, Dholpur House, is used by the Union Public Service Commission.

== Demographics ==
As of the 2021 census, Dholpur municipality had a population of 246,489.

As of the 2011 census, Dholpur municipality had a population of 126,142 and the urban agglomeration had a population of 133,229. The municipality had a sex ratio of 862 females per 1,000 males and 13.6% of the population were under six years old. The effective literacy was 76.56%; male literacy was 84.22% and female literacy was 67.74%.

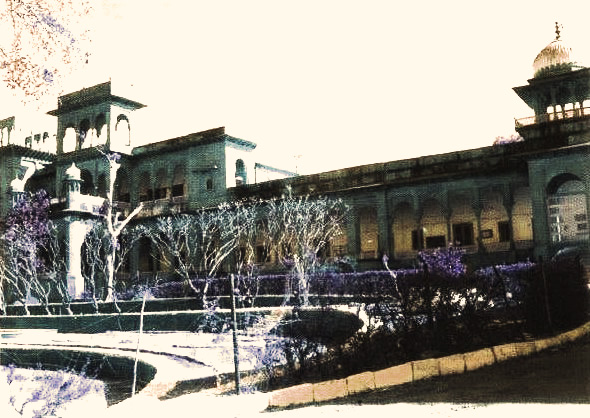
Kesarbagh Palace, now the Dholpur Military School (RJ)

The local language is Rajasthani, Hindi, Brajbhasha. Dholpur is home to Hindu and Jain communities.

== Education ==
Dholpur Military School is housed in Kesarbagh Palace, a magnificent mansion of the former ruler of the erstwhile Dholpur State. It is 10.5 kilometers away from Dholpur City and on Dholpur-Bari Road.

Govt PG College is located two kilometers away from the city towards the railway station. The PG college in Dholpur city was established four decades ago after independence. Notable alumni include DP Sharma, International Digital Diplomat and National Brand Ambassador, Swachh Bharat Mission, India, and Manoj Rajoria, Member of Parliament, Republic of India.

== Climate ==
Dholpur is reputed to be the location of the highest recorded temperature in India, at 50 °C on 3 June 2017. The hottest months are May and June, which mark the oppressive summer season. Temperatures in summers are normally higher than 40 °C. Coldest months are December and January where temperatures sometimes reach near-zero and subzero levels. The lowest recorded temperature is -4.3 °C on 29 January 2017. Annual average rainfall is 860 mm.

Climate data for Dholpur (1981–2010, extremes 1955–2012)
Month	Jan	Feb	Mar	Apr	May	Jun	Jul	Aug	Sep	Oct	Nov	Dec	Year
Record high °C (°F)	32.6 (90.7)	36.8 (98.2)	42.8 (109.0)	47.3 (117.1)	49.8 (121.6)	50.0 (122.0)	46.0 (114.8)	42.2 (108.0)	41.7 (107.1)	41.8 (107.2)	37.7 (99.9)	32.6 (90.7)	50.0 (122.0)
Mean daily maximum °C (°F)	22.8 (73.0)	27.5 (81.5)	33.9 (93.0)	40.3 (104.5)	43.1 (109.6)	42.1 (107.8)	36.3 (97.3)	34.3 (93.7)	35.1 (95.2)	35.0 (95.0)	30.5 (86.9)	24.8 (76.6)	33.8 (92.8)
Mean daily minimum °C (°F)	7.5 (45.5)	10.7 (51.3)	15.9 (60.6)	22.3 (72.1)	26.8 (80.2)	28.4 (83.1)	26.7 (80.1)	25.3 (77.5)	24.2 (75.6)	18.8 (65.8)	12.9 (55.2)	9.0 (48.2)	19.1 (66.4)
Record low °C (°F)	−4.3 (24.3)	0.2 (32.4)	4.0 (39.2)	11.0 (51.8)	16.7 (62.1)	18.4 (65.1)	20.9 (69.6)	17.4 (63.3)	14.9 (58.8)	8.9 (48.0)	3.1 (37.6)	−3.3 (26.1)	−4.3 (24.3)
Average rainfall mm (inches)	5.6 (0.22)	9.6 (0.38)	6.3 (0.25)	2.4 (0.09)	12.6 (0.50)	51.6 (2.03)	165.3 (6.51)	210.6 (8.29)	112.8 (4.44)	21.3 (0.84)	6.6 (0.26)	5.6 (0.22)	610.2 (24.02)
Average rainy days	0.7	0.8	0.7	0.4	1.5	3.3	8.9	9.6	4.8	0.8	0.4	0.4	32.3
Average relative humidity (%) (at 17:30 IST)	60	48	36	25	26	40	66	73	64	48	52	59	50
Source: India Meteorological Department

== See also ==
- Dholpur–Sarmathura Railway
- Dholpur State
- Tagawali
