= Dholpur district =

Coordinates: 26°42′N 77°54′E

- District of Rajasthan
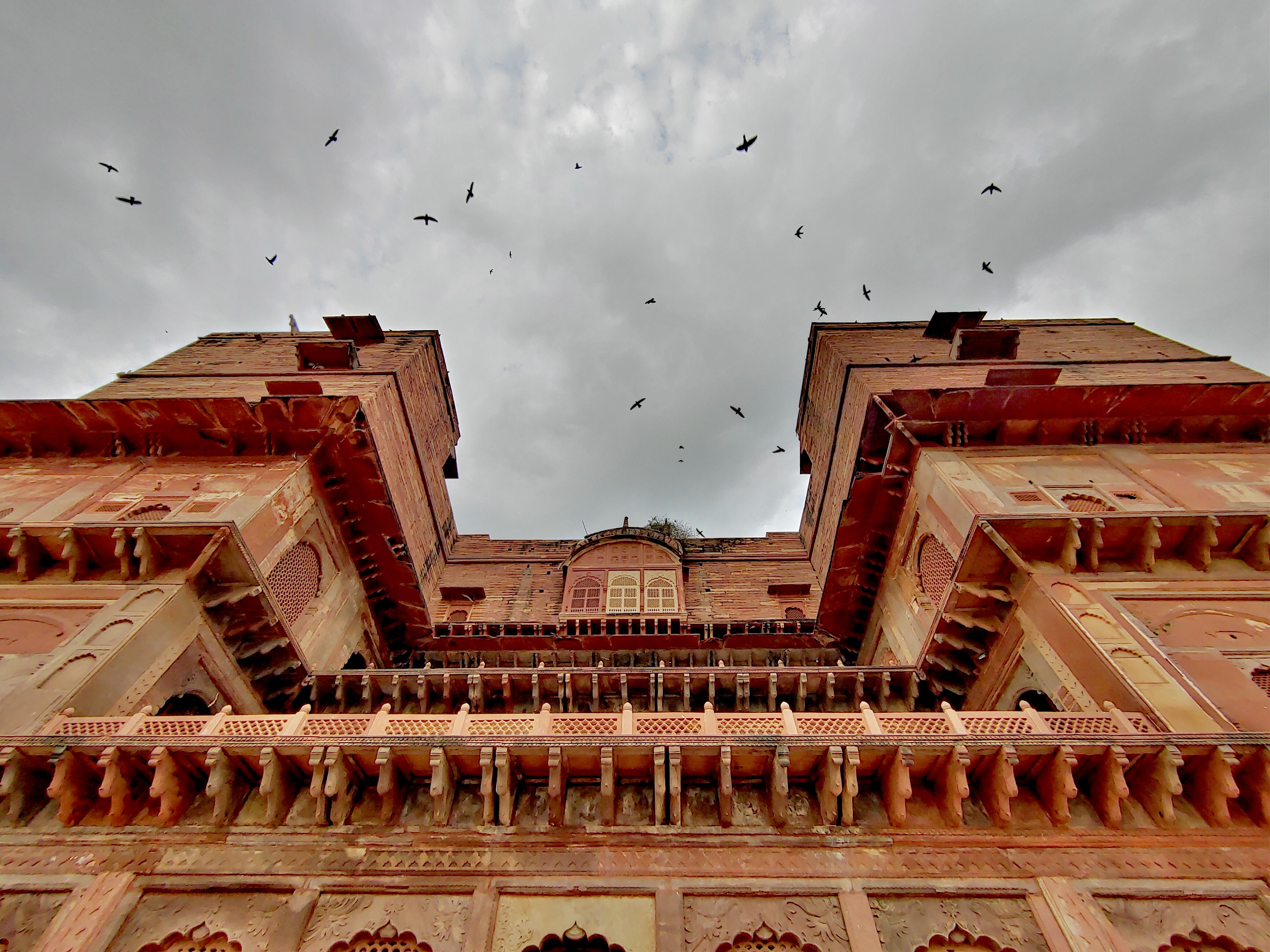
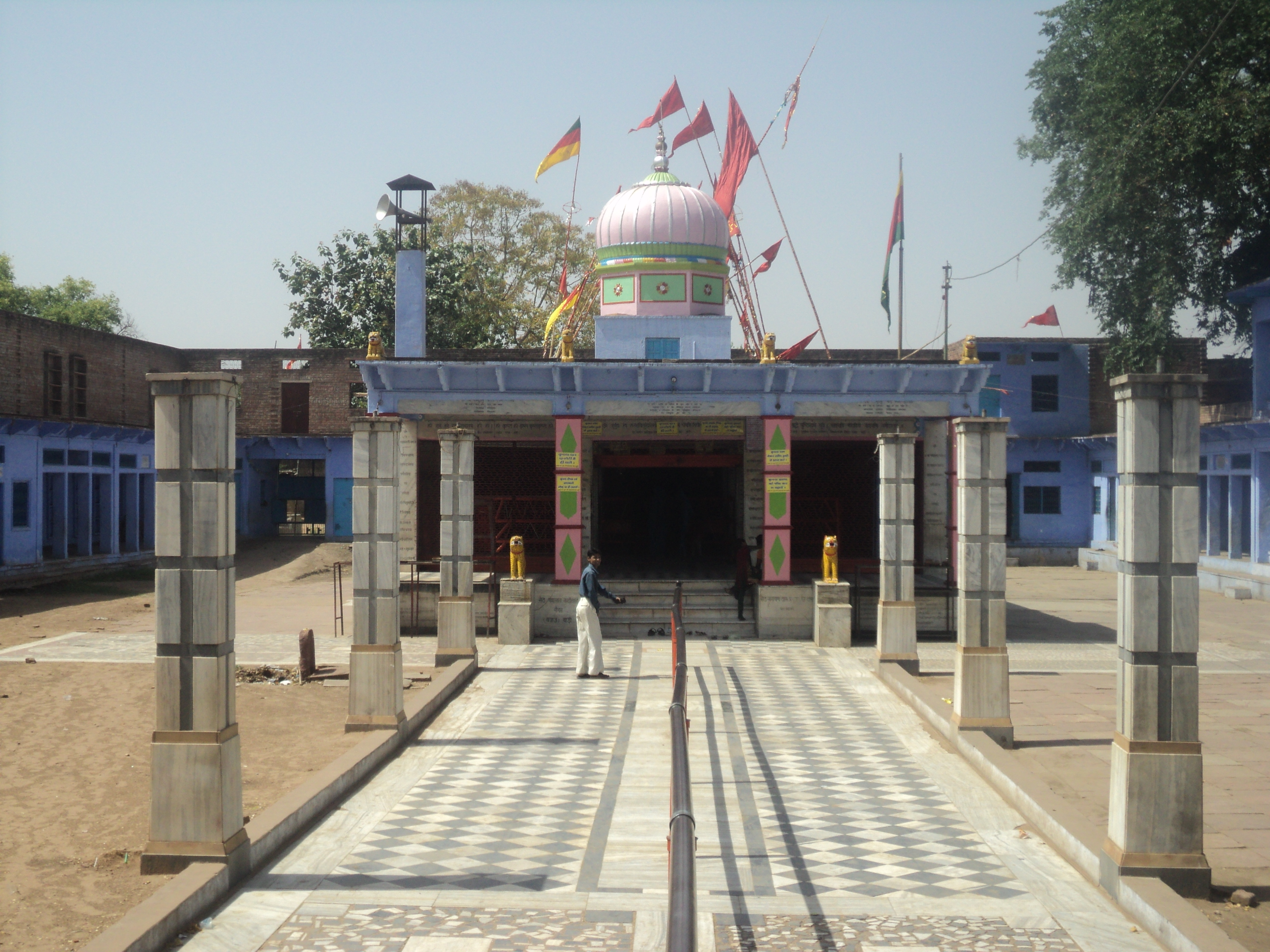
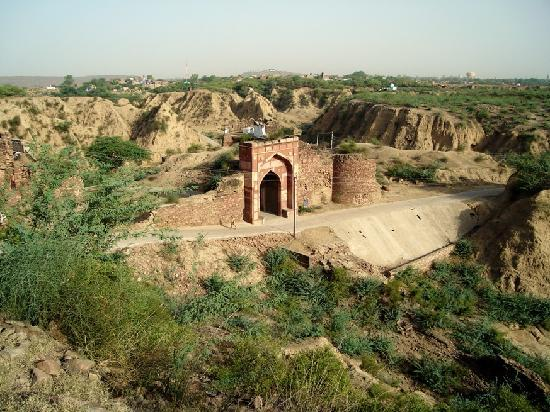
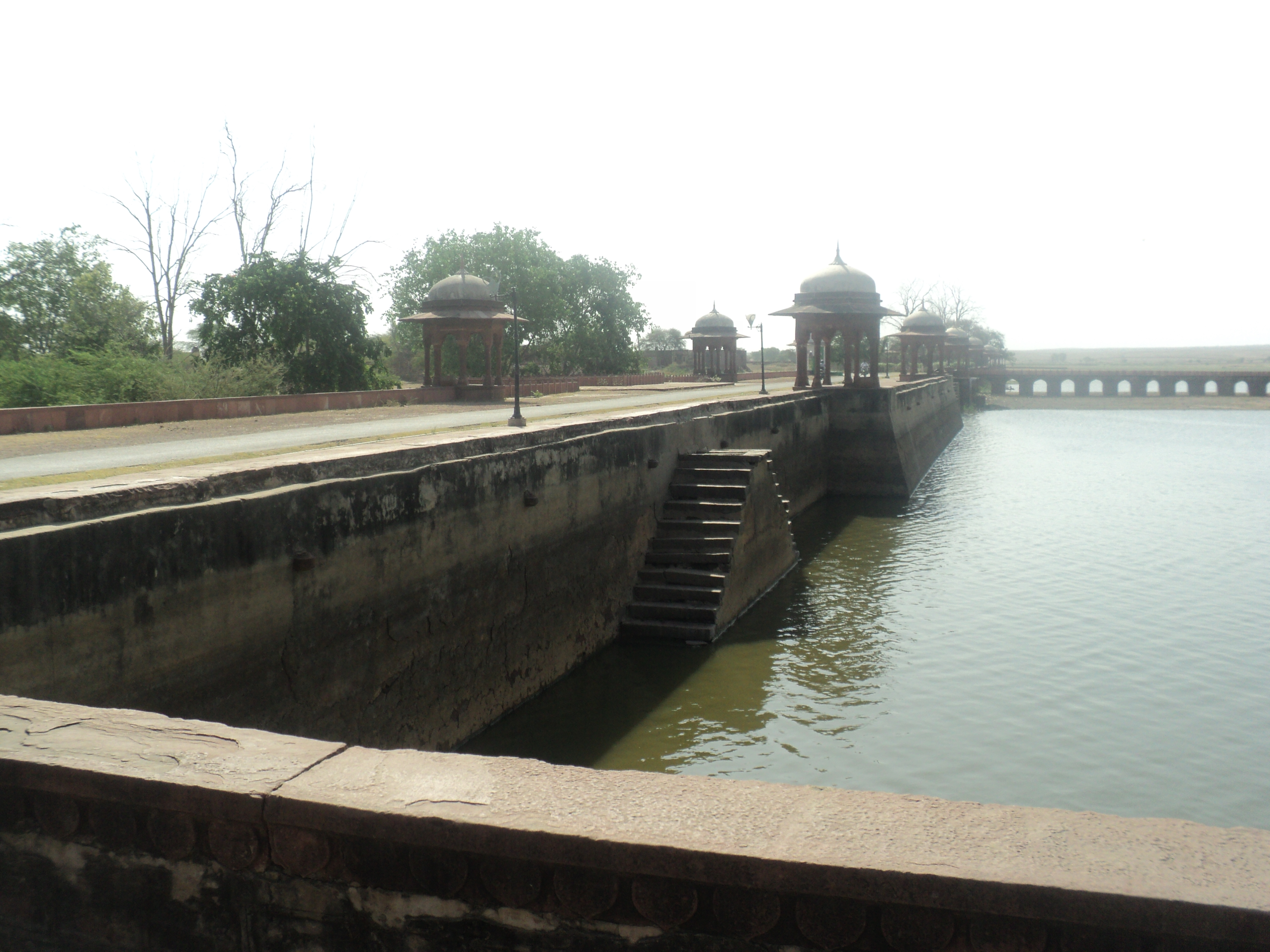
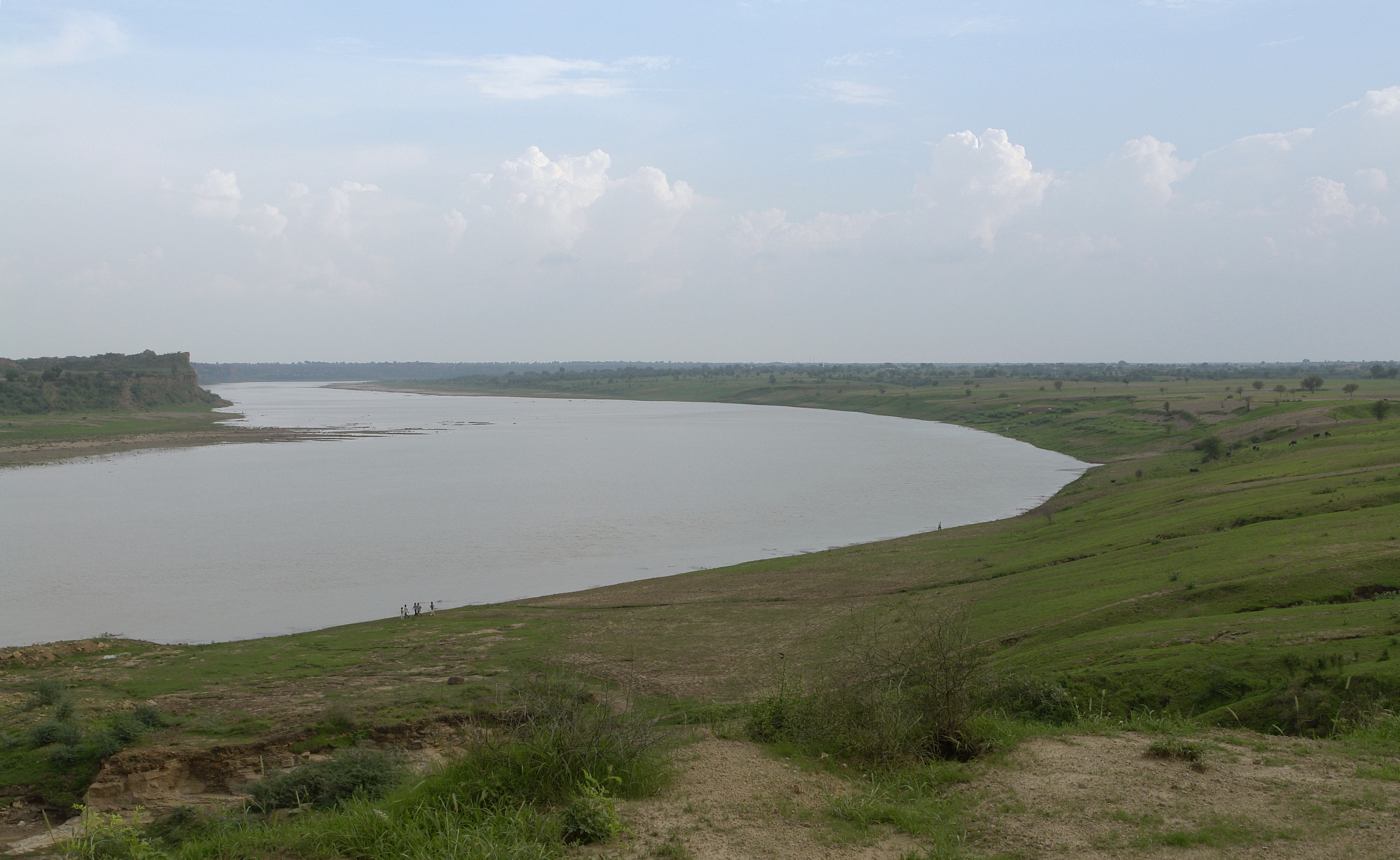
- Rani ki Haveli in Machkund, Kalia Mata Temple in Bari, Talab-e-Shahi, Chambal River near Dholpur, Shergarh Fort

- Location of Dholpur district in Rajasthan
- Country: India
- State: Rajasthan
- Division: Bharatpur

Area
  - Total: 3,084 km^{2} (1,191 sq mi)

Population (2011)
  - Total: 1,206,516
  - Density: 391.2/km^{2} (1,013/sq mi)
- Time zone: UTC+05:30 (IST)

Dholpur district is a district of eastern Rajasthan state in Northern India. The town of Dholpur is the district headquarters. Dholpur District is a part of Bharatpur Divisional Commissionerate. It was carved out from the erstwhile Bharatpur District on 15 April 1982.

Dholpur District has an area of 3084 km^{2}. The Chambal River forms the southern boundary of the district, across which lies the state of Madhya Pradesh. The district is bounded by the state of Uttar Pradesh on the east and northeast, by Bharatpur District of Rajasthan on the northwest, and Karauli District of Rajasthan on the west. All along the bank of the Chambal River the district is deeply intersected by ravines; low ranges of hills in the western portion of the district supply quarries of fine-grained and easily worked red sandstone.

== Administration ==
Administratively the district is divided into four subdivisions, Dholpur, Bari, Rajakhera, and Baseri, and six tehsils, Dholpur, Bari, Rajakhera, Basedi, Sarmathura and Saipau.

== Demographics ==
Religions in Dhaulpur district (2011)
Religion	Percent
Hinduism	93.45%
Islam	5.99%
Other or not stated	0.56%

According to the 2011 census Dholpur district had a population of 1,206,516, making Dholpur the 394th most populated of India's 640 districts. The district had a population density of 398 inhabitants per square kilometre (1,030/sq mi). Its population growth rate over the decade 2001-2011 was 22.78%. Dholpur had a sex ratio of 845 females for every 1000 males, and a literacy rate of 70.14%. 20.51% of the population lives in urban areas. Scheduled Castes and Scheduled Tribes make up 20.36% and 4.86% of the population respectively.

Languages of Dholpur district (2011)
1. Hindi (97.9%)
2. Braj Bhasha (1.58%)
3. Others (0.51%)

Historical population
Year	Pop.	±% p.a.
1901	298,547	—
1911	273,322	−0.88%
1921	241,508	−1.23%
1931	246,660	+0.21%
1941	286,788	+1.52%
1951	302,123	+0.52%
1961	363,727	+1.87%
1971	459,655	+2.37%
1981	585,059	+2.44%
1991	749,479	+2.51%
2001	983,258	+2.75%
2011	1,206,516	+2.07%

At the time of the 2011 Census of India, 97.91% of the population in the district spoke Hindi and 1.58% Braj Bhasha as their first language.

== Wildlife ==
The district has 2 Wildlife Sanctuaries- Van Vihar Wildlife Sanctuary and Ramsagar Wildlife Sanctuary.
