= Jaipur Rural Lok Sabha constituency =

Lok Sabha constituency in Rajasthan

Coordinates: 27.1°N 75.6°E

Jaipur Rural
- Lok Sabha constituency
- Interactive Map Outlining Jaipur Rural Lok Sabha Constituency

Constituency details
- Country: India
- Region: North India
- State: Rajasthan
- Assembly constituencies: Kotputli; Viratnagar; Shahpura; Phulera; Jhotwara; Amber; Jamwa Ramgarh; Bansur
- Established: 2008
- Reservation: None

Member of Parliament
- 18th Lok Sabha
- Incumbent Rao Rajendra Singh
- Party: Bhartiya Janta Party
- Elected year: 2024

Jaipur Rural is one of the 25 Lok Sabha (parliamentary) constituencies in Rajasthan state in western India. This constituency came into existence in 2008 as a part of the implementation of delimitation of parliamentary constituencies.This seat is dominated by Yadavs followed by Jat community after them Gujjars also has significant presence.

== Assembly segments ==
Presently, Jaipur Rural Lok Sabha constituency comprises eight Vidhan Sabha (legislative assembly) segments. These are:

#	Name	District	Member	Party	2024 Lead
40	Kotputli	Kot Behror	Hansraj Patel	BJP	INC
41	Viratnagar	Kot Behror	Kuldeep Dhankad	BJP	INC
42	Shahpura	Jaipur	Manish Yadav	INC	INC
44	Phulera	Jaipur	Vidhyadhar Singh	INC	BJP
46	Jhotwara	Jaipur	Rajyavardhan Singh Rathore	BJP	BJP
47	Amber	Jaipur	Prashant Sharma	INC	INC
48	Jamwa Ramgarh (ST)	Jaipur	Mahendra Pal Meena	BJP	INC
63	Bansur	Kot Behror	Devi Singh Shekhawat	BJP	INC

== Members of Parliament ==
Year	Member	Party
Till 2009 : Constituency did not exist
2009	Lalchand Kataria	Indian National Congress
2014	Rajyavardhan Singh Rathore	Bharatiya Janata Party
2019	Rajyavardhan Singh Rathore	Bharatiya Janata Party
2024	Rao Rajendra Singh	Bharatiya Janata Party

== Election results ==
=== 2024 ===
2024 Indian general election: Jaipur Rural
Party	Candidate	Votes	%	±%
BJP	Rao Rajendra Singh	617,877	48.96	▼15.28
INC	Anil Chopra	616,262	48.83	▲15.39
BSP	Hanuman Sahay	3,850	0.31	▼0.31
NOTA	None of the above	7,519	0.60	▼0.13
Majority		1,618	0.12	▼30.68
Turnout		1,262,054	56.70	▼8.84
BJP hold		Swing		

=== 2019 ===
2019 Indian general elections : Jaipur Rural
Party	Candidate	Votes	%	±%
BJP	Col. Rajyavardhan Singh Rathore	820,132	64.24	▲1.96
INC	Krishna Poonia	426,961	33.44	▲3.92
NOTA	None of the Above	9,351	0.73	▼0.40
BSP	Virender Singh Bidhuri	7,976	0.62	N/A
Margin of victory		3,93,171	30.80	▼1.96
Turnout		12,79,667	65.54	▲5.92
BJP hold		Swing		

=== 2014 ===
2014 Indian general elections: Jaipur Rural
Party	Candidate	Votes	%	±%
BJP	Col. Rajyavardhan Singh Rathore	632,930	62.28	▲29.36
INC	Dr. C. P. Joshi	3,00,034	29.52	▼11.01
NPP	Naveen Pilania	31,617	3.11	New
IND.	Kamal Kumar Gaur	9,480	0.93	N/A
AAP	Anil Godara	6,917	0.68	New
NOTA	None of the Above	11,533	1.13	N/A
Majority		3,32,896	32.76	▲25.15
Turnout		10,13,691	59.62	▲12.10
BJP gain from INC		Swing		

=== 2009 ===
2009 Indian general elections: Jaipur Rural
Party	Candidate	Votes	%	±%
INC	Lal Chand Kataria	278,266	40.53	−−−
BJP	Rao Rajendra Singh	2,26,029	32.92	−−−
IND.	Sukhbir Singh Jaunapuria	1,27,664	18.59	−−−
JD(U)	Ramniwas Yadav	8,505	1.24	−−−
BSP	Rajesh Sharma	7,568	1.10	−−−
Majority		52,237	7.61	−−−
Turnout		6,86,585	47.52	−−−
INC win (new seat)				

== See also ==
- Jaipur Rural district
- List of constituencies of the Lok Sabha
