= Rohit Bohra =

Indian politician

- रोहित बौहरा
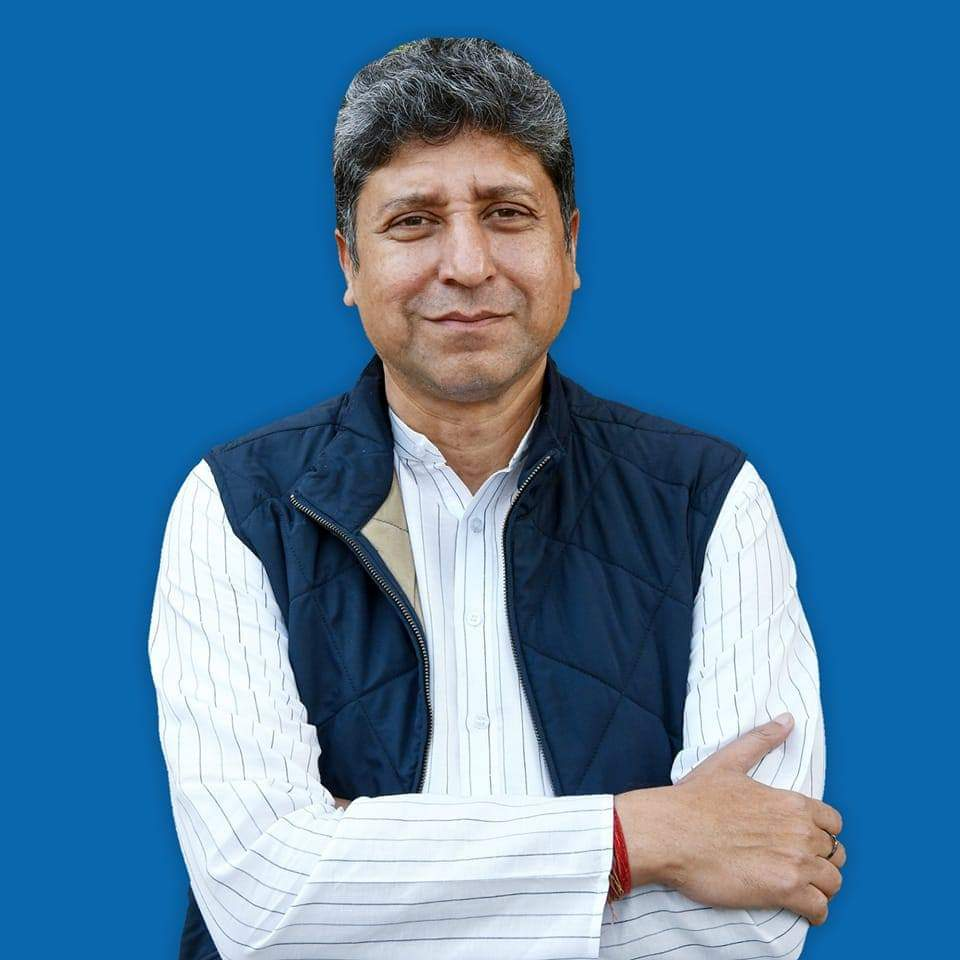

Member of the Rajasthan Legislative Assembly
- In office 11 December 2018 – Present
- Preceded by: Pradhyuman Singh
- Constituency: Rajakhera

Treasurer of the Rajasthan Pradesh Congress Committee
- In office 2025 - Present

Elected Member of the All India Congress Committee
- In office 2022 - Present

Personal details
- Born: 30 May 1966 (age 60) Dholpur, Rajasthan
- Party: Indian National Congress
- Spouse: Shivani Bohra
- Children: 2
- Parent: Pradhyuman Singh (father)
- Education: MBA and Bachelor of Commerce
- Alma mater: University of Rajasthan; R. A. Podar Institute of Management; Commerce College, Jaipur; St Xavier's School, Jaipur
- Occupation: Businessman
- Profession: Politician

Rohit Bohra (born 30 May 1966) is an Indian politician from Rajasthan and a primary member of the Indian National Congress. He currently serves as a Member of the Rajasthan Legislative Assembly, representing Rajakhera Assembly constituency in Dholpur district. Bohra has been elected to the Assembly for two consecutive terms.

He was elected as a Member of the Legislative Assembly from the Rajakhera constituency in the 2018 Rajasthan Legislative Assembly election for the first time. He was re-elected as MLA from the Rajakhera Assembly constituency in the 2023 Rajasthan Legislative Assembly election.

Bohra serves as the Treasurer of the Rajasthan Pradesh Congress Committee (RPCC), following his earlier tenure as a General Secretary of the RPCC (2023–2025). He is also an elected member of the All India Congress Committee. Over the course of his political career, he has held several organizational roles, including President of the District Congress Committee in Dholpur (2010–2013) and Secretary of the Rajasthan Pradesh Congress Committee (2013–2019).

== Personal life ==
Bohra is the third generation political leader from highly influential Bohra Family from Dholpur in Rajasthan. He is son of Shri Pradhyuman Singh, a former Finance Minister in the Government of Rajasthan, and Shobhna Bohra. His father is a notable politician who served seven terms as a Member of the Legislative Assembly (India) from the Rajakhera Assembly constituency and the President of the 16th State Finance Commission Rajasthan. His grand-father was also a Member of the Legislative Assembly who represented the Rajakhera constituency in Rajasthan Legislative Assembly.

He is well-educated and an alumnus of reputed educational institutions. He holds an MBA and a Bachelor of Commerce degree. He successfully runs his family business, which is spread across Rajasthan.

== Political career ==
Bohra has a strong political background and played an active role in electoral strategy and political campaigning for his father during assembly elections. He started his political career as the President of the District Congress Committee in Dholpur (2010–2013) and was later promoted to Secretary of the Rajasthan Pradesh Congress Committee (2013–2019).

He was elected as a Member of the Legislative Assembly (India) for the first time from the Rajakhera Assembly constituency in the 2018 Rajasthan Legislative Assembly election, where he defeated his rival Bharatiya Janata Party candidate Ashok Sharma by 14,991 votes. He is known for developing a personal connection with every voter and party worker. During his first term, he focused on the development of healthcare, sanitation, water, and infrastructure in the Rajakhera constituency. As a first-term MLA, he worked actively to deliver government schemes to the public in his assembly constituency, as implemented by the Third Gehlot Ministry. He was credited and praised by Ashok Gehlot for saving the Indian National Congress government during the 2022 Rajasthan political crisis. Later, he was elevated to the post of General Secretary of the Rajasthan Pradesh Congress Committee.

He was re-elected as an MLA from the Rajakhera Assembly constituency in the 2023 Rajasthan Legislative Assembly election, defeating his rival Bharatiya Janata Party candidate Neerja Sharma, who is the wife of Ashok Sharma, by 15,230 votes. This victory marked his second consecutive win from the Rajakhera Assembly constituency.

All India Congress Committee appointed Bohra as the Treasurer of the Rajasthan Pradesh Congress Committee following his tenure as General Secretary of the RPCC (2023–2025). During this period, he was involved in strengthening the party’s organizational presence and working with senior Congress leaders at both the state and national levels.

== See also ==
- 2023 Rajasthan Legislative Assembly election
- 2022 Rajasthan political crisis
- 2018 Rajasthan Legislative Assembly election
- General Election to Assembly Constituencies: Trends & Results Dec-2023 Assembly Constituency 80 - Rajakhera (Rajasthan)
- Election Commission of India- State Election, 2018 to the Legislative Assembly Of Rajasthan
- List of Elected and Co-opted Members of AlCC (2022)
