= R. A. Podar Institute of Management =

R. A. Podar Institute of Management (RAPIM)
- आर.ए.पोद्दार प्रबंधन संस्थान
- Type: Business School
- Established: 1974
- Chancellor: Shri Kalraj Mishra
- Vice-Chancellor: Prof. Alpana Kateja
- Director: Prof. Anurag Sharma
- Location: Jaipur, Rajasthan, India
- Campus: 5 acres (2.0 ha); Urban
- Website: https://www.rapim.ac.in/

R. A. Podar Institute of Management, Faculty of Management Studies (RAPIM) is a provider of management education in Jaipur city, in Rajasthan state, India. It was set up in 1974, as a constituent unit of the University of Rajasthan. The institute offers MBA, MBA(Services Management) and MBA(Executive) courses, also offers a Ph.D. program in Management. The institute campus at J.L.N. Road is spread over an area of approximately 20,000 square meters (5 Acres).

== History ==
In the early sixties a need for management education was felt to keep up with the changing scenario of business in India. The University of Rajasthan, Jaipur, started the MBA program in 1968. The R.A. Podar Institute of Management was established in 1974 as a constituent unit of the university. It was the sixth B-School established in the country.

With the setting up of the institute, an MBA flagship program was launched.

== Academics ==
- Master of Business Administration (four semester full-time programme)
- Master of Business Administration (Services Management)
- Master of Business Administration (Executive) (six semester part-time programme)

== Admissions ==
Students get admission with PIM-MAT for the Services Management 4 semester full course programme and R-Mat (basis the rank) for the general 4 semester full-time programme.

== Notable alumni ==
- Rohit Bohra, Politician and Businessman
