= Gyan Prakash Pilania =

Indian politician (1932–2024)

Dr. Gyan Prakash Pilania

Member of Parliament, Rajya Sabha
- In office 29 June 2004 – 9 April 2014
- Constituency: Rajasthan

Director General of Police, Rajasthan
- In office 31 August 1988 – 21 December 1989
- Preceded by: P.C. Mishra
- Succeeded by: Rajendra Shekhar

Member of Rajasthan Public Service Commission
- In office 22 December 1989 – 17 February 1994

Personal details
- Born: 18 February 1932 Sri Ganganagar, Kingdom of Bikaner, Rajputana Agency, British India
- Died: 13 October 2024 (aged 92) Jaipur, Rajasthan, India
- Party: National People's Party (India)
- Other political affiliations: Bharatiya Janata Party
- Children: Naveen Pilania
- Education: Master of Arts in History and Hindi; Ph.D in History
- Alma mater: University of Manchester; University of Rajasthan
- Awards: President's Police Medal

Gyan Prakash Pilania (18 February 1932 – 13 October 2024) was an Indian retired police officer, politician and social reformer from Rajasthan. He was elected to the Rajya Sabha, the upper house of parliament, for two terms from 2004 to 2014 as a member of the Bharatiya Janta Party. He was an Indian Police Service officer of 1955 batch and served as Director General of Police of Rajasthan.

He served as the president of All India Jat Mahasabha. As a social leader he is known for leading Jat Reservation Agitation. He was a member of the National People's Party (India) after resigning from Bharatiya Janata Party. He is recipient of Police Medal (1972) and President's Police Medal (1984).

Pilania died in Jaipur on 13 October 2024, at the age of 92.
