= Sardarpura Assembly constituency =

Constituency of the Rajasthan legislative assembly in India

Coordinates: 26.28°N 73.01°E

Sardarpura
- Constituency No. 127 for the Rajasthan Legislative Assembly

Constituency details
- Country: India
- Region: North India
- State: Rajasthan
- District: Jodhpur district
- Established: 1967
- Reservation: None

Member of Legislative Assembly
- 16th Rajasthan Legislative Assembly
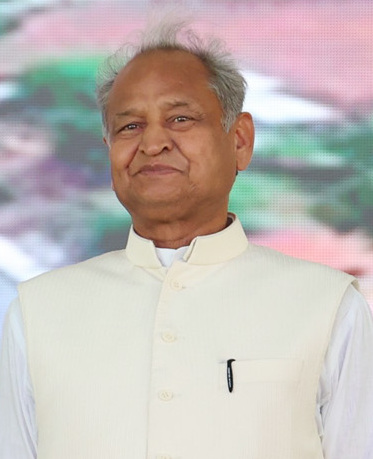
- Incumbent Ashok Gehlot
- Party: Indian National Congress
- Elected year: 2023
- Preceded by: Man Singh Deora

Sardarpura Assembly constituency is one of constituencies of Rajasthan Legislative Assembly in the Jodhpur Lok Sabha constituency.

== Members of the Legislative Assembly ==
Year	Member	Party
1967	D. Dutt	Bharatiya Jana Sangh
1972	Amrit Lal Gahlot	Indian National Congress
1977	Madho Singh	Janata Party
1980	Man Singh Deora	Indian National Congress
1985	Man Singh Deora	Indian National Congress
1990	Rajendra Gehlot	Bharatiya Janata Party
1993	Rajendra Gehlot	Bharatiya Janata Party
1998	Man Singh Deora	Indian National Congress
1998 By-Election	Ashok Gehlot	Indian National Congress
2003	Ashok Gehlot	Indian National Congress
2008	Ashok Gehlot	Indian National Congress
2013	Ashok Gehlot	Indian National Congress
2018	Ashok Gehlot	Indian National Congress
2023	Ashok Gehlot	Indian National Congress

== Election results ==
=== 2023 ===
2023 Rajasthan Legislative Assembly election: Sardarpura
Party	Candidate	Votes	%	±%
INC	Ashok Gehlot	96,859	56.67	−6.64
BJP	Mahendra Rathore	70,463	41.23	+7.66
NOTA	None of the above	1,222	0.71	+0.22
Majority		26,396	15.44	−14.3
Turnout		170,910	66.3	−0.65
INC hold		Swing		

=== 2018 ===
2018 Rajasthan Legislative Assembly election: Sardarpura
Party	Candidate	Votes	%	±%
INC	Ashok Gehlot	97,081	63.31	
BJP	Shambhu Singh	51,484	33.57	
NOTA	None of the above	753	0.49	
Majority		45,597	29.74	
Turnout		153,350	66.95	
INC hold		Swing		

=== 2013 ===
2013 Rajasthan Legislative Assembly election: Sardarpura
Party	Candidate	Votes	%	±%
INC	Ashok Gehlot	77,835	54.96	
BJP	Shambhu Singh Khetasar	59,357	41.91	
NOTA	None of the above	1,779	1.26	
RJVP	Ganpat	502	0.35	
NCP	Prakash Joshi	480	0.34	
Majority		18,478	13.05	
Turnout		1,41,774	70.20	
INC hold		Swing		

=== 2008 ===
2008 Rajasthan Legislative Assembly election: Sardarpura
Party	Candidate	Votes	%	±%
INC	Ashok Gehlot	55,516	55.42	
BJP	Rajendra Gehlot	40,176	40.10	
BSP	Prem Singh	1,505	1.51	
Majority		15,340	15.32	
Turnout		1,00,180	55.40	
INC hold		Swing		

=== 2003 ===
2003 Rajasthan Legislative Assembly election: Sardarpura
Party	Candidate	Votes	%	±%
INC	Ashok Gehlot	58,509	56.74	
BJP	Mahendra Kumar Jhabak	39,518	38.32	
NCP	Mukesh Gehlot	1,923	1.86	
BSP	Naveen Bhandari	970	0.94	
Majority		18,991	18.42	
Turnout		103,123	55.67	
INC hold		Swing		

== See also ==
- Member of the Legislative Assembly (India)
