= 2020 Rajasthan political crisis =

Cabinet crisis in Indian state of Rajasthan

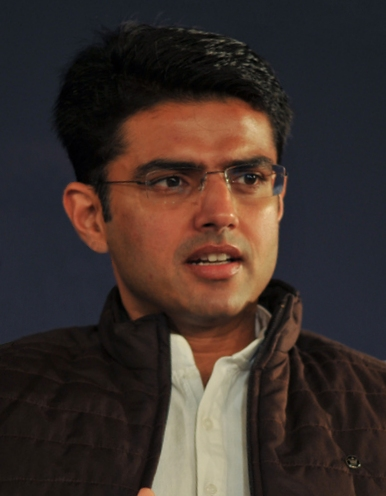
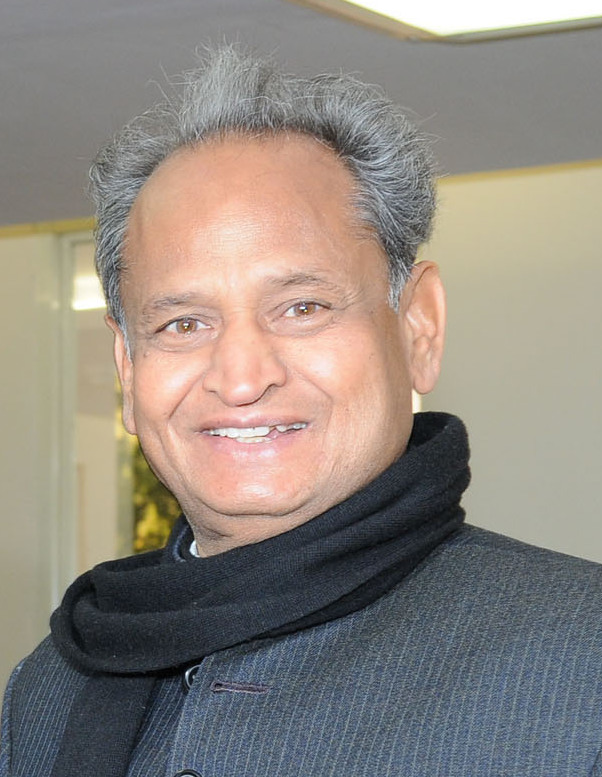
- Sachin Pilot (left), Ashok Gehlot (right)
- Date: 12 July 2020 - 14 August 2020
- Duration: 33 Days
- Location: Rajasthan, India
- Type: Parliamentary crisis
- Cause: Series of disputes between Ashok Gehlot and Sachin Pilot
- Participants: Indian National Congress (INC); Other political parties and Independents
- Outcome: Sachin Pilot sacked as Deputy Chief Minister along with 2 cabinet ministers.; Rajasthan Congress pass resolution to disqualify 19 dissented MLAs.; Sachin Pilot moves to Rajasthan High Court challenging the disqualification notice.; Bahujan Samaj Party moves to Rajasthan High Court challenging the merger of their 6 MLAs in the Indian National Congress.; Governor of Rajasthan calls for a session on 14 August for the government to prove majority.; Sachin Pilot remains in the Indian National Congress

On 12 July 2020, around 19 members of the Rajasthan Legislative Assembly, as claimed by the then Deputy Chief Minister of Rajasthan Sachin Pilot, flew to Delhi after disputes over different offices between rival factions of the Rajasthan Pradesh Congress Committee, starting a governmental crisis in the state of Rajasthan.

== Background ==
On 12 July 2020, the then Deputy Chief Minister of Rajasthan, Sachin Pilot and 18 loyalist MLAs went to Delhi from Jaipur, claiming that they have support of a total of 30 MLAs and can topple the Ashok Gehlot-led Congress government in Rajasthan. Gehlot called senior Congress leader Rahul Gandhi and Congress President Sonia Gandhi to handle the situation, slamming the Bharatiya Janata Party for trying to destabilize his government. BJP leaders claimed that it is the Congress party's internal matter and BJP is not responsible. Additionally, senior leaders Randeep Singh Surjewala, Ajay Maken and Avinash Pande reached Jaipur to meet Ashok Gehlot. They held a meeting at around 9 pm at the Chief Minister's Residence.

The Congress Legislature Party issued a whip to all its MLAs to be present in the meeting which was scheduled to be held at the Chief Minister's House or strict action would be taken against them. Meanwhile, Sachin Pilot reaffirmed that he won't be joining BJP. Senior BJP leader and former Congress member, Jyotiraditya Scindia met him on 13 July at his Delhi residence. Congress MLAs along with Chief Minister Ashok Gehlot and other leaders, held a meeting for the confidence motion.

On the other hand, a short video clip was posted on the social media, showing that Sachin Pilot including him has the support of 19 Congress MLAs and 3 Independent MLAs.

Sachin Pilot and his supporting MLAs were also invited to discuss the issue, but denied. He demanded the post of Chief Minister of Rajasthan, which he'd been denied after the 2018 Rajasthan Elections. On 14 July 2020, he was removed from the post of Deputy Chief Minister of Rajasthan and President of Rajasthan Pradesh Congress Committee along with his 2 MLAs from the post of ministers.

Rajasthan Bharatiya Janata Party President Satish Poonia slammed Indian National Congress and Ashok Gehlot not for choosing a young leader as Chief Minister of the state. He also said that if Sachin Pilot wants to join BJP, we are always open for them. BJP also said that there should be floor test in the Rajasthan Legislative Assembly to prove their majority. Union Home Minister and senior BJP leader Amit Shah sent former Chief Minister of Rajasthan and BJP's national vice-president Vasundhara Raje to Jaipur to discuss the issue with BJP Rajasthan leaders and Leader of Opposition in Rajasthan Legislative Assembly, Gulab Chand Kataria said that they were closely monitoring the situation and we are in touch with Jagat Prakash Nadda, President of the Bharatiya Janata Party.

On the other hand, Sachin Pilot called for a press conference on 15 July 2020 for taking steps after being removed as both Deputy Chief Minister of Rajasthan and President of Rajasthan Pradesh Congress Committee. The press conference which was organised by Sachin Pilot, scheduled on 15 July 2020 was cancelled. Later, he was sent a notice by Speaker of Rajasthan Legislative Assembly, C. P. Joshi about the dissolution of his membership from the assembly. In an exclusive interview with ANI, he reported to be said that he won't be joining BJP. Also, he would take help of senior advocates on this matter.

In the evening, he went to meet his MLAs in the resort of Gurugram. While, on the other hand, Chief Minister Ashok Gehlot continuously alleged the BJP for horse-trading. But, BJP leader and Union Minister Gajendra Singh Shekhawat refused the allegation and said that in Congress's internal matter, there is no connection of BJP at all. Congress leader Rahul Gandhi told media that if any leader wants to quit Congress, then he can. We are not going to stop them.

== Outcome ==
After Deputy Chief Minister Sachin Pilot refused to listen to the Indian National Congress leadership, Chief Minister of Rajasthan Ashok Gehlot sacked Sachin Pilot from the post of the Deputy Chief Minister of Rajasthan. He was also removed from the post of the President of the Rajasthan Pradesh Congress Committee and Education Minister Govind Singh Dotasra was made the President of the Rajasthan Pradesh Congress Committee.

Cabinet Ministers Vishvendra Singh & Ramesh Chand Meena, who were supporting Sachin Pilot, were also sacked by the Chief Minister. State Presidents of the Rajasthan Pradesh Youth Congress and Rajasthan Pradesh Congress Seva Dal were also sacked by the Indian National Congress.

With this, started the political fight between Governor of Rajasthan Kalraj Mishra & Chief Minister Ashok Gehlot, on the issue for commencing the session of the Rajasthan Legislative Assembly. Government of Rajasthan wants to call the session on short notice, but Governor wants that at least a 21 days notice is given before the commencement of the session. However, the deadlock ended up with the permission for calling the Rajasthan Legislative Assembly session on 14 August 2020.

After this, Chief Minister Ashok Gehlot decided to shift his MLAs from Jaipur to Jaisalmer.

On 10 August, the event changed drastically, when Sachin Pilot met with Rahul Gandhi & Priyanka Gandhi. On the same day, rebel MLA Bhanwar Lal Sharma reached Jaipur and met with Chief Minister Ashok Gehlot. Sachin Pilot met Chief Minister Ashok Gehlot and finally, both the factions of the Rajasthan Pradesh Congress Committee reunited.

On 14 August, Ashok Gehlot led Rajasthan Government won the trust vote in the Rajasthan Legislative Assembly through voice vote. All the MLAs of the Rajasthan Government were present, although 73 BJP MLAs were not present.

== See also ==
- 2020 Madhya Pradesh political crisis
- 2022 Rajasthan political crisis
