= Rajakhera =

Rajakhera राजाखेड़ा
- City
- Rajakhera
- Location in Rajasthan, India Rajakhera (India)
- Coordinates: 26.54°N 78.10°E
- Country: India
- State: Rajasthan
- District: Dholpur

Government
  - Type: Government of Rajasthan
  - MLA: Rohit Bohra

Population (2011)
  - Total: 163,904
- Time zone: UTC+5:30 (IST)
- 328025: 328025
- ISO 3166 code: RJ-IN
- Vehicle registration: RJ-11

Rajakhera is a city and a municipality situated near the banks of the Chambal River in Dholpur district in the Eastern part of the Indian state of Rajasthan. Its part of Braj region and the local language has Braj Bhasha dialect. The culture is fused with Rajasthan and its border states.

The Rajakhera is divided into 25 wards for which elections are held every 5 years. As per report released by Census India 2011, Rajakhera has a total population of 163,904, out of which 89,022 are males while 74,882 are females. Rajakhera Tehsil has a total of 116 villages.

The nearest metropolis cities are Agra and Morena. The nearest major railway stations are Dholpur Junction railway station and Agra Cantonment railway station. The nearest Airports are Agra Airport and Gwalior Airport. In the region, Chambal River is the only river known for fresh water, dolphin and crocodile sanctuary.

== Geography ==
Rajakhera is located at 26.54°N 78.10°E. It has an average elevation of 153 metres (505 feet). It is on the border of Rajasthan and also shares a border with Agra, Uttar Pradesh and Morena, Madhya Pradesh.

It is about 38 km from Agra, Uttar Pradesh and about the same distance from Dholpur district. Shamsabad, Agra (17 km) is the nearest town close to Uttar Pradesh border between Agra and Rajakhera. Utangan River flows between Shamshabad and Rajakhera and forms the border of Rajasthan and Uttar Pradesh. The bridge on this river was constructed in 1964 which allowed easy commute to Agra and other major cities.

== Demographics ==
As of 2011 India census, Rajakhera Tehsil of Dhaulpur district has a total population of 163,904 out of which 89,022 are males while 74,882 are females. In 2011 there were a total 27,149 families residing in Rajakhera Tehsil. The Average Sex Ratio of Rajakhera Tehsil is 841.

As per Census 2011 out of total population, 20.5% people live in Urban areas while 79.5% live in the Rural areas. The average literacy rate in urban areas is 67.5% while that in rural areas is 66.3%. Also the Sex Ratio of Urban areas in Rajakhera Tehsil is 860 while that of Rural areas is 836. The population of Children of age 0–6 years in Rajakhera Tehsil is 30,305 which is 18% of the total population. There are 16,206 male children and 14,099 female children between the age 0–6 years. Thus as per the Census 2011 the Child Sex Ratio of Rajakhera Tehsil is 870 which is greater than Average Sex Ratio (841) of Rajakhera Tehsil. The total literacy rate of Rajakhera Tehsil is 66.55%. The male literacy rate is 64.44% and the female literacy rate is 42.12% in Rajakhera Tehsil.

== Transportation and Connectivity ==
The only mode of transport to Rajakhera is by road. The closest major Bus stands are in Agra and Dholpur. Both are approx. 38 km from Rajakhera. Rajasthan State Road Transport Corporation buses run between Agra and Rajakhera. Bus service from Rajakhera to Agra, and Rajakhera to Dholpur is available in every half-hour. Rajakhera is not connected with any railway line. The inter state transport is also from Rajakhera to Pinahat (formerly known as Shrinagar), a town in the Agra district, Uttar Pradesh India.

The nearest metropolis cities are Agra and Morena. The nearest major railway stations are Dholpur Junction railway station and Agra Cantonment railway station. The nearest National Airports are Agra Airport and Gwalior Airport. The nearest International Airports are Noida International Airport, Indira Gandhi International Airport New Delhi, and Jaipur International Airport.

== Political and current affairs ==
DP Sharma (born in Samona, Rajakhera) is an Indian digital diplomat at UNDP & UNESCO and computer scientist known for digital diplomacy. He is a national brand ambassador of the Swachh Bharat Mission (cleanliness mission) initiative of Prime Minister of India Narendra Modi.

Shri Pradyumn Singh is a well-known politician and former Finance Minister in Government of Rajasthan, who served 7 terms as Member of the Legislative Assembly (India) from Rajakhera Assembly constituency till 2018. He is currently serving as President of the 16th State Finance Commission of Rajasthan.

Rohit Bohra, son of Pradyumn Singh of the Indian National Congress, won the 2018 Rajasthan Legislative Assembly election and became Member of the Legislative Assembly (MLA) from Rajakhera constituency. He was re-elected in the 2023 Rajasthan Legislative Assembly election from Rajakhera constituency.
