= Devi Singh Shekhawat =

Indian politician

Member of the Rajasthan Legislative Assembly
- Incumbent
- Assumed office 3 December 2023
- Preceded by: Shakuntala Rawat
- Constituency: Bansur

Personal details
- Born: 1 September 1966 (age 60)
- Party: Bharatiya Janata Party
- Education: University of Rajasthan
- Profession: Politician

Devi Singh Shekhawat (born 1966) is an Indian politician from Rajasthan. He is a member of the Rajasthan Legislative Assembly. He won the 2023 Rajasthan Legislative Assembly election representing the Bharatiya Janata Party from the Bansur Assembly constituency.

== Early life and education ==
Shekhawat is from Bansur, Alwar district, Rajasthan. He is the son of Roshan Singh Shekhawat. He completed his B.Sc. in maths at a college affiliated with Rajasthan University in 1989.

== Career ==
Shekhawat won from Bansur Assembly constituency representing Bharatiya Janata Party in the 2023 Rajasthan Legislative Assembly election. He polled 61,605 votes and defeated his nearest rival, Rohitash Kumar of Azad Samaj Party (Kanshi Ram), by a margin of 7,420 votes.
