= R. K. Kothari =

Indian academic administrator

Personal details
- Occupation: Professor, Vice-Chancellor
- Profession: Teaching, Administration

R. K. Kothari is an Indian education administrator. He was the Vice Chancellor of University of Rajasthan, Jaipur.
