= Jhotwara Assembly constituency =

Legislative Assembly constituency in Rajasthan State, India

Coordinates: 26.95°N 75.74°E

Jhotwara
- Constituency No. 46 for the Rajasthan Legislative Assembly

Constituency details
- Country: India
- Region: North India
- State: Rajasthan
- District: Jaipur
- Lok Sabha constituency: Jaipur Rural
- Established: 2008
- Total electors: 402,827 as on 21/02/2,026
- Reservation: None

Member of Legislative Assembly
- 16th Rajasthan Legislative Assembly
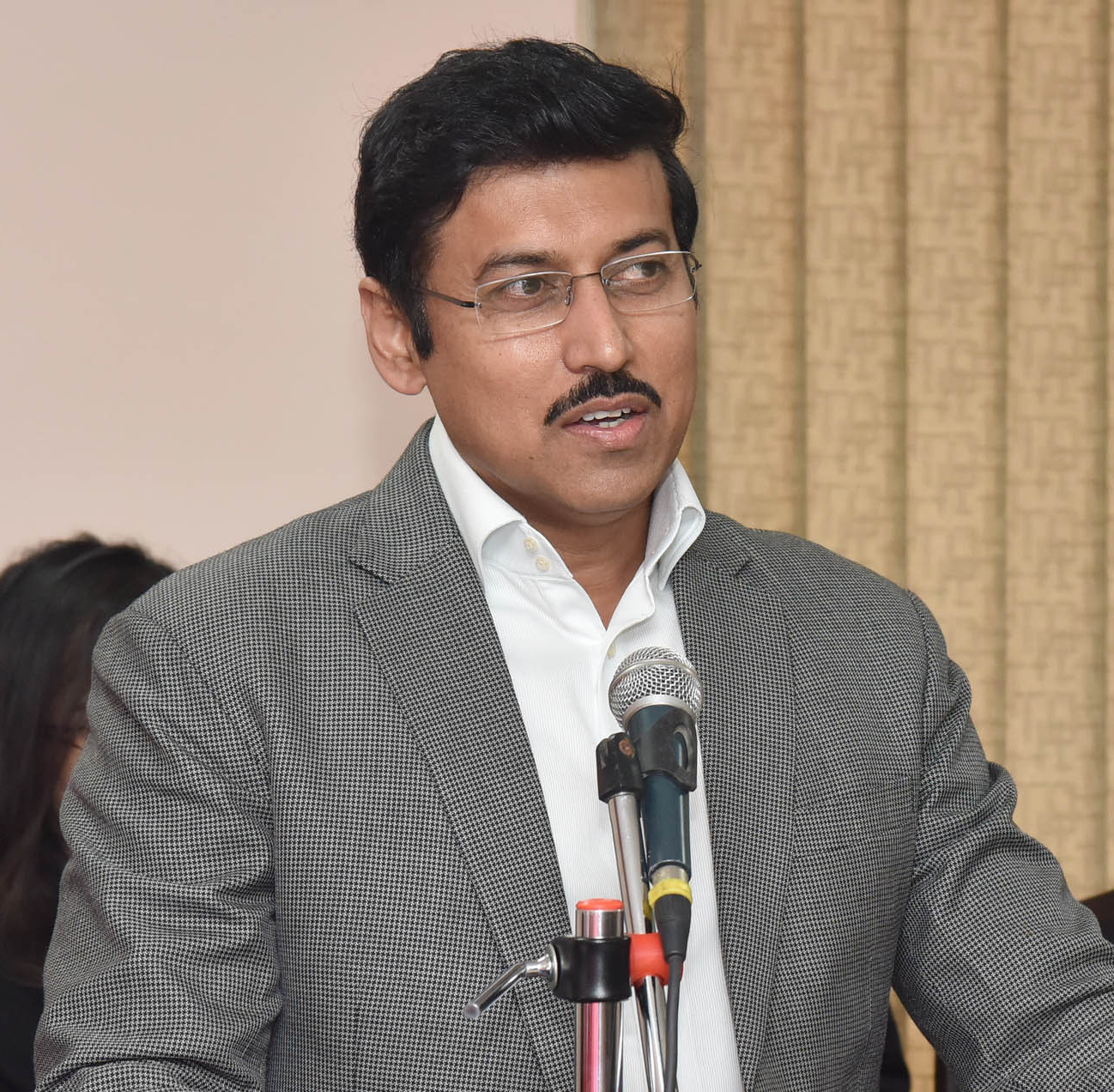
- Incumbent Rajyavardhan Singh Rathore
- Party: Bharatiya Janata Party
- Elected year: 2023

Jhotwara Assembly constituency is one of the 200 Legislative Assembly constituencies of Rajasthan state in India. Yadav, Rajput and Jat community has one of the highest population in Jhotwara. Ahir community has population in more than 39 villages and also significant population in urban area.

It is part of Jaipur district. As of 2023, it is represented by Rajyavardhan Singh Rathore of the Bharatiya Janata Party.

== Members of the Legislative Assembly ==
Year	Member	Party
Until 2013 : Constituency did not exist
2008	Rajpal Singh Shekhawat	Bharatiya Janata Party
2013	Rajpal Singh Shekhawat	Bharatiya Janata Party
2018	Lalchand Kataria	Indian National Congress
2023	Rajyavardhan Singh Rathore	Bharatiya Janata Party

== Election results ==
=== 2023 ===
2023 Rajasthan Legislative Assembly election:Jhotwara
Party	Candidate	Votes	%	±%
BJP	Rajyavardhan Singh Rathore	147,913	47.75	+3.19
INC	Abhishek Chaudhry	97,746	31.55	−17.12
Independent	Ashu Singh Surpura	55,159	17.81	
NOTA	None of the above	1,111	0.36	−0.32
Majority		50,167	16.2	+12.09
Turnout		309,792	72.21	−0.09
BJP gain from INC		Swing		

=== 2018 ===
Rajasthan Legislative Assembly Election, 2018: Jhotwara
Party	Candidate	Votes	%	±%
INC	Lalchand Kataria	127,185	48.67	
BJP	Rajpal Singh Shekhawat	116,438	44.56	
Bharat Vahini Party	Chhotu Ram Kumawat	5,733	2.19	
NOTA	None of the above	1,770	0.68	
Majority		10,747	4.11	
Turnout		261,319	72.3	

== See also ==
- List of constituencies of the Rajasthan Legislative Assembly
- Jaipur district
