= Lalchand Kataria =

Indian politician

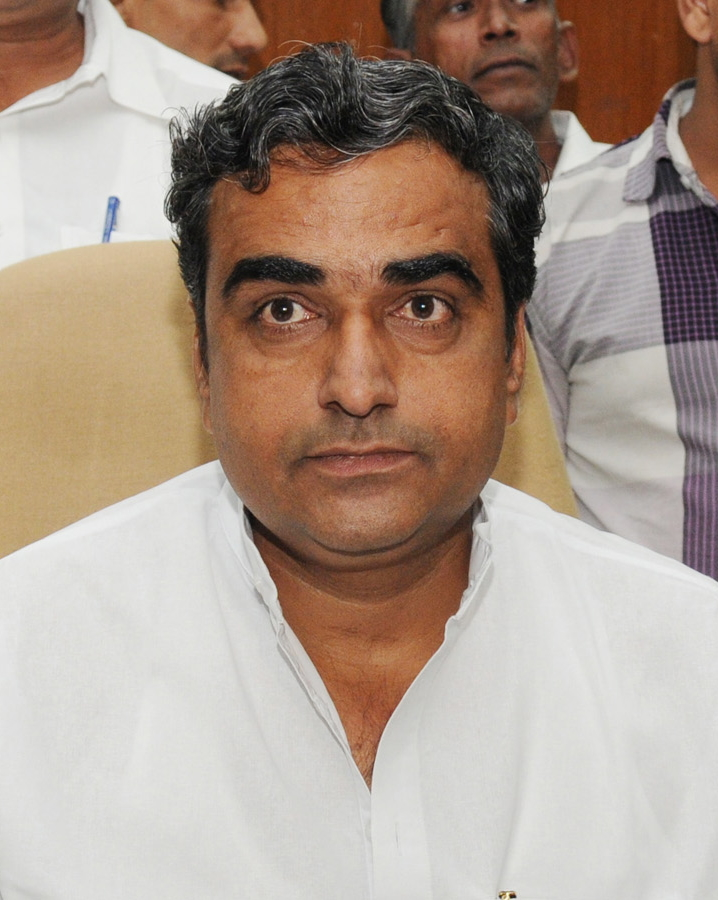

Cabinet Minister of Agriculture, Animal Husbandry & Fisheries, Government of Rajasthan
- In office 24 December 2018 – December 2023
- Succeeded by: Kirodi Lal Meena

Member of the Rajasthan Legislative Assembly
- In office 11 December 2018 – December 2023
- Preceded by: Rajpal Singh Shekhawat
- Succeeded by: Rajyavardhan Singh Rathore
- Constituency: Jhotwara
- In office 2003–2008
- Preceded by: Shahdev Sharma
- Succeeded by: Ganga Sahay Sharma
- Constituency: Amber

Member of parliament, Lok Sabha
- In office 2009–2014
- Preceded by: Constituency established
- Succeeded by: Rajyavardhan Singh Rathore
- Constituency: Jaipur Rural

Personal details
- Born: 12 June 1968 (age 57) Bisanawala, Rajasthan, India
- Party: Bharatiya Janata Party (2024- Present)
- Other political affiliations: Indian National Congress (till 2024)
- Spouse: Gayatri Kataria
- Children: 2
- As of 15 August, 2012

Lalchand Kataria (born 12 June 1968) is an Indian politician belonging to the Bharatiya Janata Party. He was elected to the Lok Sabha, the lower house of the Parliament of India, from Jaipur Rural, Rajasthan in 2009. He was appointed as Minister of State for Defense in the Second Manmohan Singh ministry on 28 October 2012, but was moved to Ministry of Rural Development (India) three days later. He was later elected as a Member of the Rajasthan Legislative Assembly from Amer Constituency in 2003, a position he currently holds. He has been the cabinet minister of Rajasthan from the year 2018.
