= Naina Sharma =

Indian sociologist

Naina Sharma is an Indian sociologist and Professor in the Department of Sociology, Rajasthan University.
