= D. P. Sharma =

Indian academic

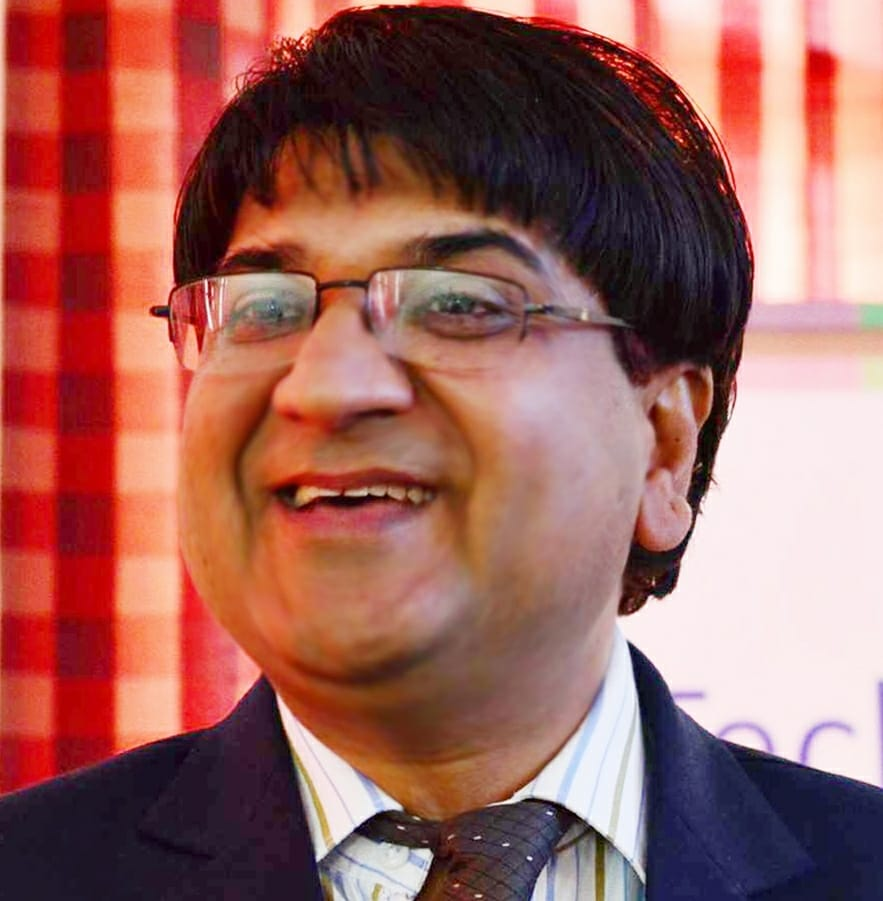
- Born: Durga Prasad Sharma; 1 May 1969 (age 57); Samona, Rajakhera, Dholpur, Rajasthan, India
- Citizenship: Indian
- Education: PhD, M.Tech, MCA, BSc
- Alma mater: University of Rajasthan
- Occupations: Digital Diplomat, Academician, Computer Scientist, Social Activist
- Known for: Digital Diplomacy
- Spouse: Anuraga Sharma
- Children: 1
- Parents: Ninua Ram Sharma (father); Gomati Devi (mother)
- Awards: Life Time Achievement International Award (Sardar Ratna)-2015; Peace Ambassador International Award (2018); Red and White Bravery Awards (2001); Civil Services Chronicle Award (1997)
- Website: dpsharma.org

Durga Prasad Sharma, better known as D. P. Sharma (born 1 May 1969), is an Indian computer scientist, digital diplomat and disability rights activist.

== Early life and career ==
Son of a small farmer Ninua Ram Sharma, Durga Prasad Sharma was born in Samona village of Rajakhera Tehsil in Rajasthan, India. He was the youngest brother of the second number among 5 brothers and 3 sisters. His left arm and right leg are affected by post-polio syndrome. After completing his primary level education, he had to walk 18 kilometers daily from his village Samona to attend the school in Rajakhera. Later he completed his degree-level education (BSc) from Government College Dholpur, Master of Computer Application (MCA), Master of Technology (M.Tech.) in Information Technology, as well as Ph.D. (Intranetwares) from University of Rajasthan, India.

In 1994, Sharma joined a national advocacy campaign for the new disabled welfare and rehabilitation legislation in India which resulted in a new law passed by the Indian Parliament, "Equal Opportunity, Protection of Rights and Full Participation Act 1995".

In 2000, Sharma became Assistant Professor of Computer Science & Informatics and later promoted to Associate Professor and a Full Professor.

Sharma is an expatriate research adviser at the Arba Minch University, Université Paris-Saclay, France, University of Hildesheim Germany, Rajasthan Technical University, Kota (India). He has been serving as an honorary adviser to an international educational program run by Vrije Universiteit Brussel (Belgium).

== Global work ==
Sharma has served with United Nations autonomous organizations such as the UNDP, ILO, UNESCO and the IGF, —an initiative launched by the United Nations to democratize Internet governance. Commenting on the current state of the Internet, Sharma remarked, 'It’s ironic that the Internet, which once served as a groundbreaking channel to democratize people’s voices globally, is now struggling to achieve democratic governance itself.

== Achievements ==
In 2005, DP Sharma developed a job search engine for people with disabilities which was later adopted by the Ministry of Social Justice and Empowerment, Government of India. It was designed to help disabled people in search of jobs based on their suitability of working environment and physical limitations. The search engine was featured as a cover story in the SMB edition of PCQuest in March 2008.

In 2017, Sharma was nominated as National Brand Ambassador (Academics and Youth) by the Prime Minister of India, Narendra Modi, to the nationwide campaign Swachh Bharat Mission (Clean India Drive) .

In 2019, on the basis of Sharma's recommendation, the Government of Rajasthan started a process of establishing a Technical University in Jaipur, Rajasthan to provide technology-enabled training, education, and rehabilitation to people with disabilities.

Sharma authored or co-authored 22 books, edited/reviewed several academic articles and contributed editorials on labour and disability issues for Rajasthan Patrika. He is also a member of editorial boards of academic journals – the MECS Press Journal named 'International Journal of Modern Education and Computer Science'

Sharma advocates for end-to-end transformations in the Indian education system. He is involved in designing policies for inclusive internet access.

== Selected awards and honours ==
- The Godfrey Phillips (Red and White Bravery) National Award 2001.
- The Sardar Vallabhbhai Patel Lifetime Achievements International Award (Sardar Ratna)-2014-15.
- Peace Messenger Award, Malaysia 2020.
- Rajasthan Ratna Bharat Award (2024) by Rajasthan Information Technology Organization, Jaipur and felicitated by then Speaker of Rajasthan Assembly, Rajasthan, 2024.
- Legendary Personality of Rajasthan by the Rajasthan Foundation of the Government of Rajasthan (2022)
- 2021 IEEE Computational Linguistics International Award for Low Resource Language
- Civil Services Chronicle Award (1997) by Chronicle India Publications

== Selected publications ==
- "Artificial Intelligence (AI) for IT Energy Efficiency and Green AI for Environment Sustainability", 30 June 2025, ISBN 978-3031894190, Pethuru Raj; D.P.Sharma; et al., p:325, Publisher: Springer USA
- "Engineering the Metaverse Enabling technologies, platforms and use cases", 2024, ISBN 978-1839538803, Pethuru Raj; D.P. Sharma; et al., p:438, Publication: IET UK
- "Foundation of Operating Systems(Print)", ISBN 978-81-7446-62-6-6, Publisher: Excel Books
- "Information Technology(Print)", ISBN 978-81-9054-83-4-2, Vol-2, August 2009, p. 282
- "Theory of Computation(Print)", ISBN 978-81-9054-91-2-7, Vol-3, August 2012, p. 250
- Sharma, D. P.; Khandelwal, Kapil (2011). "Knowledge-Based Systems, Problem Solving Competence and Learnability". Computational Intelligence and Information Technology. Communications in Computer and Information Science. Vol. 250. pp. 543–547. doi:10.1007/978-3-642-25734-6_93. ISBN 978-3-642-25733-9.
- Distributed and Prioritised Scheduling to Implement Carrier Aggregation in LTE Advanced Systems, IEEE Computer Society Digital Library, ACCT'14', February 2014 p;390–393
- Sharma, Durga Prasad (2021). "Emerging Paradigms and Practices in Cloud Resource Management". Autonomic Computing in Cloud Resource Management in Industry 4.0. Springer International Publishing. Vol. 1. pp. 17–40. doi:10.1007/978-3-642-25734-6_93. ISBN 978-3-030-71756-8.
- Autonomic Resource Management in a Cloud-Based Infrastructure Environment, Springer, Vol-1, 2021, p. 325-345,
- Autonomic Computing: Models, Applications, and Brokerage, Springer, Vol-1, 2021, p. 59-90,
- Emerging Paradigms and Practices in Cloud Resource Management, Springer, Vol-1, 2021, p. 0-17,
