= Viratnagar Assembly constituency =

Constituency of the Rajasthan legislative assembly in India

Coordinates: 27.42°N 76.18°E

Viratnagar
- Constituency No. 41 for the Rajasthan Legislative Assembly

Constituency details
- Country: India
- Region: North India
- State: Rajasthan
- District: Jaipur district
- Established: 2008
- Reservation: None

Member of Legislative Assembly
- 16th Rajasthan Legislative Assembly
- Incumbent Kuldeep Dhankad
- Party: Bharatiya Janata Party

Viratnagar Nagar Assembly constituency is one of the 200 Legislative Assembly constituencies of Rajasthan state in India. It comprises Viratnagar tehsil and parts of Kotputli and Shahpura tehsils, all in Jaipur district. It is a segment of the Jaipur Rural Lok Sabha constituency and it came into existence after the 2008 delimitation exercise.

As of 2023, it is represented by Kuldeep Dhankad of the Bharatiya Janata Party.

== Members of the Legislative Assembly ==
Election	Name	Party
2008	Phoolchand Bhinda	Bharatiya Janata Party
2013	Phoolchand Bhinda	Bharatiya Janata Party
2018	Indraj Gurjar	Indian National Congress
2023	Kuldeep Dhankad	Bharatiya Janata Party

== Election results ==
=== 2023 ===
2023 Rajasthan Legislative Assembly election: Viratnagar
Party	Candidate	Votes	%	±%
BJP	Kuldeep	83,262	46.88	+31.97
INC	Indraj Singh Gurjar	65,673	36.98	−1.45
ASP(KR)	Ramchandra Saradhana	18,897	10.64	
Independent	Chandra Prakash Saini	3,258	1.83	
Independent	Bheem Sahan Gurjar	2,098	1.18	
NOTA	None of the above	1,344	0.76	+0.44
Majority		17,589	9.9	−2.62
Turnout		177,596	76.42	+2.55
BJP gain from INC		Swing		

=== 2018 ===
2018 Rajasthan Legislative Assembly election: Viratnagar
Party	Candidate	Votes	%	±%
INC	Indraj Gurjar	59,427	38.43	
Independent	Kuldeep Dhankad	40,060	25.91	
BJP	Phoolchand Binda	23,058	14.91	
Independent	Ratna Kumari	9,026	5.84	
Independent	Raghuveer Prasad Meena	5,690	3.68	
BSP	Sachin Verma	5,139	3.32	
Bharat Vahini Party	Vikram Singh Purusharthi	3,543	2.29	
Independent	Haridas	1,633	1.06	
NOTA	None of the above	501	0.32	
Majority		19,367	12.52	
Turnout		154,618	73.87	
INC gain from BJP		Swing		

== See also ==
- List of constituencies of the Rajasthan Legislative Assembly
- Jaipur district
