= Rao Rajendra Singh =

Indian politician

Member of Parliament, Lok Sabha
- Incumbent
- Assumed office 4 June 2024
- Preceded by: Rajyavardhan Singh Rathore
- Constituency: Jaipur Rural

Member of Rajasthan Legislative Assembly
- In office 2003 – 2018
- Preceded by: Devi Lal Bairwa
- Succeeded by: Alok Beniwal
- Constituency: Shahpura

Personal details
- Political party: Bharatiya Janata Party

Rao Rajendra Singh (Hindi pronunciation: [ɾaːʋ ɾaːd͡ʒeːn̪d̪ɾə sɪŋgʱ]) is an Indian politician a Member of Parliament in the 18th Lok Sabha from Jaipur Rural as a Bharatiya Janata Party candidate. He was a member of the Rajasthan Legislative Assembly from Shahpura from 2003 to 2018.

== Political career ==
Singh was a member of the Rajasthan Legislative Assembly, representing the Shahpura for the Bharatiya Janata Party from 2003 to 2018. He was defeated by Alok Beniwal in 2018 elections.

In the 2024 Lok Sabha election, Singh defeated Anil Chopra of Indian National Congress by 1,615 votes.
