= Zuhair Al-Shun =

Palestinian diplomat (born 1958)

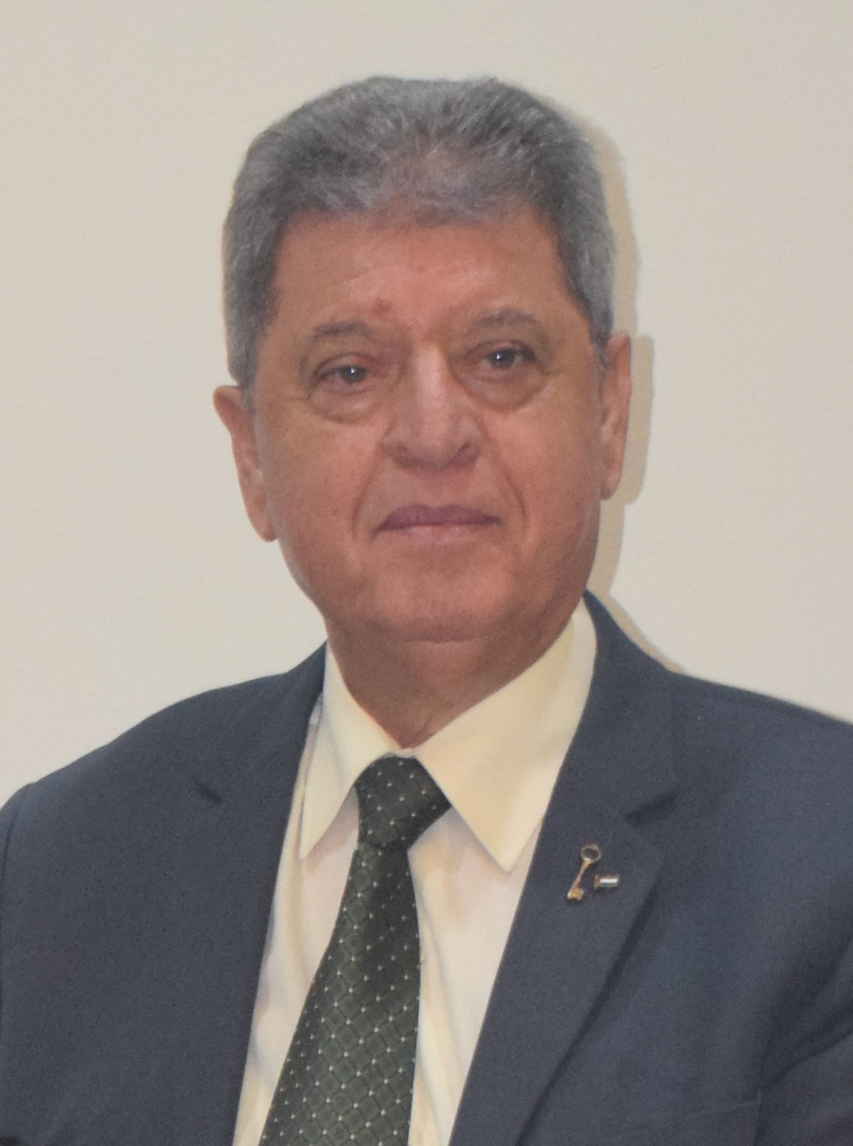

Ambassador of Palestine to Indonesia
- Incumbent
- Assumed office 17 January 2018
- President: Mahmoud Abbas
- Preceded by: Fariz Mehdawi

Personal details
- Born: 31 July 1958 (age 67)
- Education: University of Rajasthan (MBA, Ph.D.)
- Occupation: Diplomat

Zuhair Saleh Muhammad Al-Shun (Arabic: زهير صالح محمد الشن; born 31 July 1958) is a Palestinian diplomat who currently serves as the Palestinian ambassador to Indonesia.

== Early life and education ==
Al-Shun was born on 31 July 1958. He studied elementary and high school in Palestine. While in high school, he actively participated in demonstrations against Israel. Therefore, he was imprisoned twice. Then, he completed his postgraduate education at Rajasthan University in 1990 with an MBA degree and earned a doctorate in business administration at the same university.

== Career ==
Al-Shun began his career in foreign service in 1991 when the Palestinian government assigned him to be a consular in Tunisia until 1995. Subsequently, he became the Palestinian ambassador to various countries such as Ethiopia, the African Union, Uganda, Kenya, Bosnia and Herzegovina, and Morocco. On 17 January 2018, he became Palestine's ambassador to Indonesia.

== Personal life ==
Al-Shun married a Palestinian woman and has three children: two sons and one daughter.
