= Prashant Sharma (politician) =

Indian politician

Member of the Rajasthan Legislative Assembly
- Incumbent
- Assumed office 3 December 2023
- Preceded by: Satish Poonia
- Constituency: Amber

Prashant Sharma (born 1964) is an Indian politician from Rajasthan. He is a member of the Rajasthan Legislative Assembly from Amber constituency in Jaipur district. He won the 2023 Rajasthan Legislative Assembly election representing the Indian National Congress.

== Early life and education ==
Sharma is from Civil Lines, Jaipur, Rajasthan. He is the son of Sahdev Sharma. He completed his B. Com. Honours in 1984 at Commerce College, which is affiliated with University of Rajasthan, Jaipur.

== Career ==
Sharma won from Amber Assembly constituency representing Indian National Congress in the 2023 Rajasthan Legislative Assembly election. He polled 108,914 votes and defeated his nearest rival, Satish Poonia of the Bharatiya Janata Party, by a margin of 9,092 votes. He lost the 2018 Rajasthan Legislative Assembly election to Satish Poonia of the BJP by a margin of votes.
