= Vibhuti Bhushan Sharma =

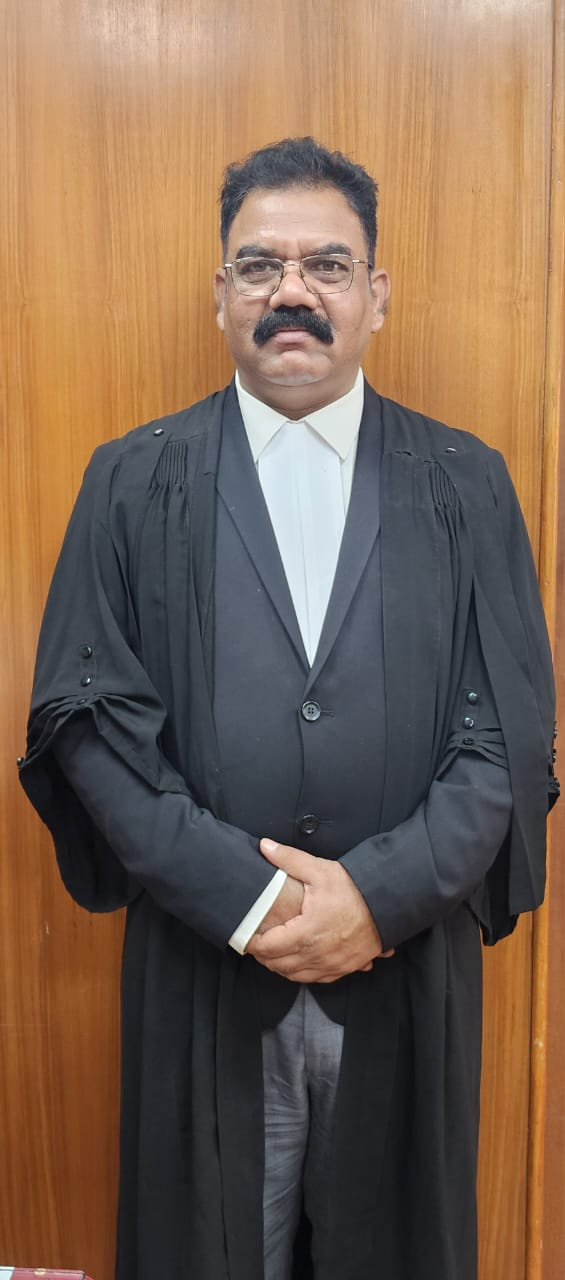
- Vibhuti in 2023

President, Rajasthan High Court Bar Association, Jaipur
- In office 16 March 2012 – 12 July 2013
- Preceded by: Karanpal Singh
- Succeeded by: Manoj Sharma

Government Counsel, Government of Rajasthan
- In office 25 July 2008 – 25 June 2012

Personal details
- Born: Vibhuti Bhushan Sharma; 27 July 1972 Rajasthan, India
- Party: Indian National Congress
- Education: University of Rajasthan, Jaipur; Rajasthan College, Jaipur

Vibhuti Bhushan Sharma is an Indian lawyer and senior legal counsel who served as the Additional Advocate General (AAG) for the Government of Rajasthan at the Rajasthan High Court, Jaipur Bench from 2019 to 2024. He was elected as the youngest ever President of the Rajasthan High Court Bar Association, Jaipur in March 2012, and had previously served as its General Secretary during 2007–2008.

== Legal career ==
Sharma began his legal practice at the Rajasthan High Court, Jaipur Bench, in 2000. He was elected as General Secretary of the Rajasthan High Court Bar Association, Jaipur in 2007 and later became its youngest elected President in 2012.

He served as the Rajasthan Government's counsel in the High Court between 2008 and 2012, and was appointed as the Additional Advocate General (AAG) in 2019.

In 2009, he represented the state in a case involving irregularities in the Rajasthan Pre-Medical Test (RPMT), where discrepancies in OMR sheets and thumb impressions were alleged.

In 2019, following an internal inquiry initiated by the state government, Sharma informed the Rajasthan High Court that irregularities had been found in the promotion process of police personnel, and that corrective steps would be taken. The petition was later disposed of.

Sharma has also filed multiple Public Interest Litigations (PILs). In 2018, he filed a PIL challenging the use of government funds for the Gaurav Yatra, a political tour led by then Chief Minister Vasundhara Raje. In its ruling, the Rajasthan High Court barred the state government from using government machinery for political purposes during the tour and directed that official events not be merged with party functions.

The Indian National Congress appointed Sharma a member of the committee to monitor implementation of the Election Manifesto 2009. He served as a member of the Congress Manifesto Committee constituted by AICC (All India Congress Committee) for the 2013 Assembly Elections in the state of Rajasthan. He has also worked as a member of the Congress Manifesto Committee in the 2008 Assembly Elections.

He has an M.A. in Public Administration from the University of Rajasthan at Jaipur, a Ph.D. in Total Quality Education, an LL.B, and a Bachelor's in Journalism and Mass Communication.
