= Shahpura, Jaipur Assembly constituency =

Constituency of the Rajasthan legislative assembly in India

Coordinates: 27.39°N 75.97°E

Shahpura
- Constituency No. 42 for the Rajasthan Legislative Assembly

Constituency details
- Country: India
- Region: North India
- State: Rajasthan
- District: Jaipur district
- Established: 2008
- Total electors: 233,684
- Reservation: None

Member of Legislative Assembly
- 16th Rajasthan Legislative Assembly
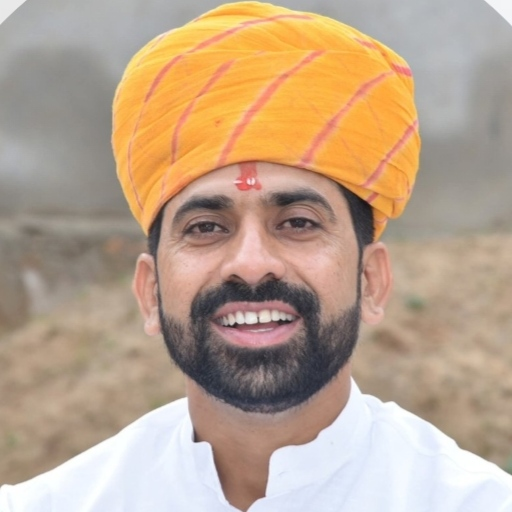
- Incumbent Manish Yadav
- Party: Indian National Congress
- Elected year: 2023
- Preceded by: Alok Beniwal

Shahpura Assembly constituency is one of constituencies of Rajasthan Legislative Assembly in the Jaipur Rural Lok Sabha constituency in India.

Shahpura constituency covers all voters from Shahpura tehsil excluding Chhapra Khurd, Nathawala, Rampura and Saiwar of ILRC Shahpura and part of Chomu tehsil, which includes Amarpura, Khejroli, Nangal Koju, Niwana, Tigariya and Nangal Bharda of ILRC Khejroli.

== Members of the Legislative Assembly ==
Year	Member	Party
1998	Devi Lal Bairwa	Indian National Congress
2003	Rao Rajendra Singh	Bharatiya Janata Party
2008	Rao Rajendra Singh	Bharatiya Janata Party
2013	Rao Rajendra Singh	Bharatiya Janata Party
2018	Alok Beniwal	Independent
2023	Manish Yadav	Indian National Congress

== Election results ==
=== 2023 ===
2023 Rajasthan Legislative Assembly election: Shahpura
Party	Candidate	Votes	%	±%
INC	Manish Yadav	124,072	62.34	▲26.32
Independent	Alok Beniwal	59,164	29.73	▼8.51
BJP	Upen Yadav	11,233	5.64	▼17.47
NOTA	None of the above	1,035	0.52	▼0.3
Majority		64,908	32.61	▲30.39
Turnout		199,030	84.82	▲1.6
INC gain from Independent		Swing		

=== 2018 ===
2018 Rajasthan Legislative Assembly election: Shahpura
Party	Candidate	Votes	%	±%
Independent	Alok Beniwal	66,538	38.24	
INC	Manish Yadav	62,683	36.02	
BJP	Rao Rajendra Singh	40,215	23.11	
NOTA	None of the above	1,432	0.82	
Majority		3,855	2.22	
Turnout		174,001	83.22	
Independent gain from BJP		Swing		

== See also ==
- Member of the Legislative Assembly (India)
