= Kuldeep Dhankad =

Indian politician

Member of the Rajasthan Legislative Assembly
- Incumbent
- Assumed office 15 December 2023
- Preceded by: Indraj Singh Gurjar
- Constituency: Viratnagar

Personal details
- Political party: Bharatiya Janata Party
- Occupation: Politician

Kuldeep Dhankad is an Indian politician and a member of the Bharatiya Janata Party. He was elected to the Rajasthan Legislative Assembly from the Viratnagar Assembly constituency in the 2023 Rajasthan Legislative Assembly election, defeating the incumbent Indraj Singh Gurjar of the Indian National Congress with a margin of 17,589 votes.

== Political life ==
Kuldeep Dhankad entered electoral politics as a candidate of the Bharatiya Janata Party (BJP). In the 2023 elections, he contested from the Viratnagar Assembly constituency and secured a decisive victory. Dhankad defeated the sitting MLA Indraj Singh Gurjar of the Indian National Congress by a margin of 17,589 votes. Following the election, he assumed office as a Member of the 16th Rajasthan Assembly on 15 December 2023.

== Election results ==
2023 Viratnagar Assembly Election Results
Year	Constituency	Candidate	Party	Votes	Percentage	Result
2023	Viratnagar	Kuldeep Dhankad	BJP	83,262	46.88%	Elected
2023	Viratnagar	Indraj Singh Gurjar	INC	65,673	36.98%	Runner-up
2023	Viratnagar	Ramchandra Saradhana	ASPKR	18,897	10.64%	Lost

2018 Viratnagar Assembly Election Results
Year	Constituency	Candidate	Party	Votes	Percentage	Result
2018	Viratnagar	Indraj Singh Gurjar	INC	59,427	38.43%	Elected
2018	Viratnagar	Kuldeep Dhankad	IND	40,060	25.91%	Runner-up
2018	Viratnagar	Dr. Phoolchand Bhinda	BJP	23,058	14.91%	Lost
