= Satish Poonia =

Indian politician

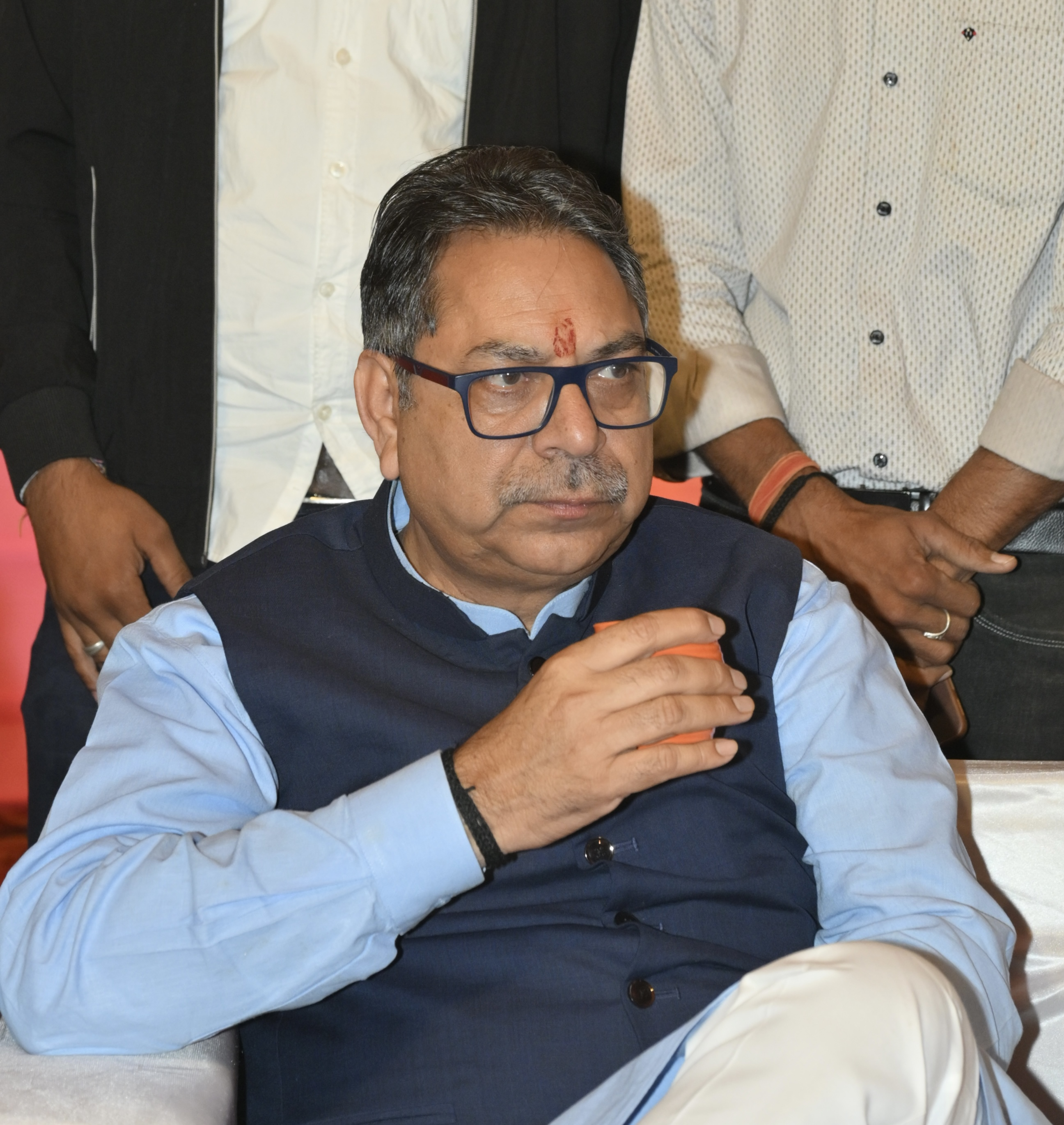
- Poonia in November 2024

Member of Parliament, Rajya Sabha
- Incumbent
- Assumed office 21 June 2026
- Preceded by: Rajendra Gehlot
- Constituency: Rajasthan

President, Bharatiya Janata Party, Rajasthan
- In office 15 September 2019 – 23 March 2023
- Preceded by: Madan Lal Saini
- Succeeded by: Chandra Prakash Joshi

National General Secretary of Bharatiya Janata Party
- Incumbent
- Assumed office 17 August 2026
- President: Nitin Nabin

Deputy Leader of the Opposition, Rajasthan Legislative Assembly
- In office 2 April 2023 – 3 December 2023
- Speaker: Vasudev Devnani
- Chief Minister: Ashok Gahlot
- Leader of the Opposition: Rajendra Singh Rathore (6 April 2023 - 3 December 2023)
- Preceded by: Rajendra Singh Rathore
- Succeeded by: Ramkesh Meena

Member of the Rajasthan Legislative Assembly
- In office 11 December 2018 – 3 December 2023
- Preceded by: Naveen Pilania
- Constituency: Amber

Personal details
- Born: 24 October 1964 (age 62) Rajgarh, Rajasthan, India
- Party: Bharatiya Janata Party
- Profession: Politician
- Website: https://www.drsatishpoonia.com/

Satish Poonia (born 24 October 1964) is an Indian politician. A member of the Bharatiya Janata Party, he has been elected for Rajya Sabha in June 2026.

He has previously served as the deputy Leader of Opposition (LoP) in the Rajasthan Assembly. Previously, he was president of the Bharatiya Janata Party, Rajasthan. He was elected to the 15th Rajasthan Assembly from Amber.

== Early life and education ==
Poonia was born on 20 December 1964 in Rajgarh, a small village in Churu district of Rajasthan. He did Doctor of Philosophy (PhD) in geography from University of Rajasthan.

== Political career ==
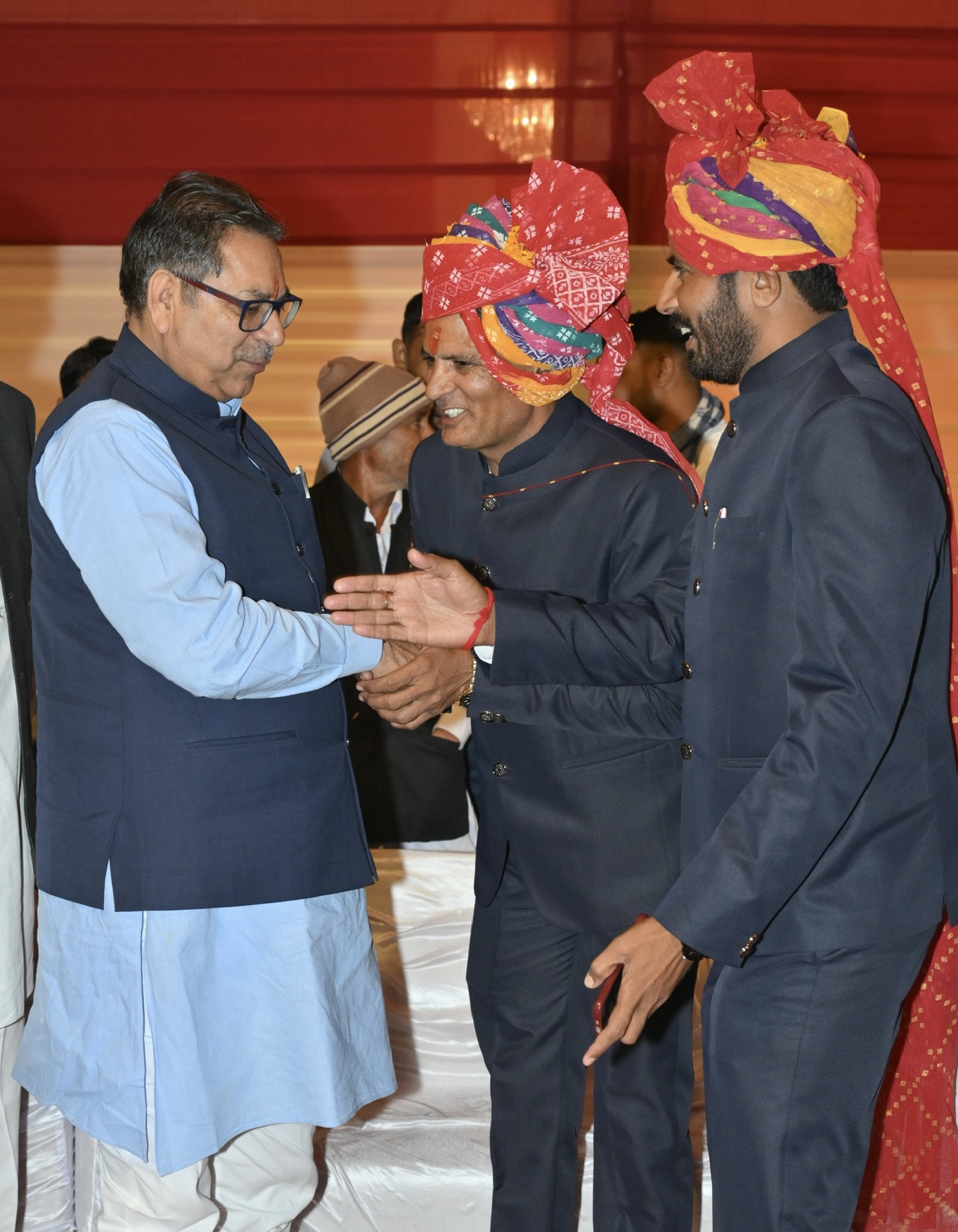
Poonia attending Meel marriage party in Sikar, Rajasthan

In the 2018 Rajasthan Legislative Assembly election, he secured victory in the Amber constituency. He defeated Prashant Sharma of the Indian National Congress (INC) by a margin of 13,276 votes.

In July 2023, he was announced as the state in-charge for Haryana for the 2024 Haryana Assembly elections.

In June 2026, he was elected as Member of Rajya Sabha from Rajasthan.
