= Phoolchand Bhinda =

Indian politician

Member of the Rajasthan Legislative Assembly
- In office 2008–2018
- Preceded by: New constituency
- Succeeded by: Indraj Gurjar
- Constituency: Viratnagar

Personal details
- Party: Bharatiya Janata Party
- Occupation: Politician

Phoolchand Bhinda is an Indian politician from the Bharatiya Janata Party and a former member of the Rajasthan Legislative Assembly who represented the Viratnagar Assembly constituency of Rajasthan from 2008 to 2018.
