= Rajendra Gehlot =

Indian politician

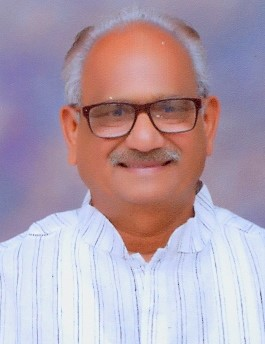

Member of Parliament, Rajya Sabha
- In office 19 June 2020 – 21 June 2026
- Preceded by: Narayan Lal Panchariya
- Succeeded by: Satish Poonia
- Constituency: Rajasthan

Member of the Rajasthan Legislative Assembly
- In office 1990–1998
- Preceded by: Man Singh Deora
- Succeeded by: Man Singh Deora
- Constituency: Sardarpura

Personal details
- Born: 8 November 1950 (73) Jodhpur City (Rajasthan)
- Party: Bharatiya Janata Party
- Spouse: Shrimati Vimla Gehlot

Rajendra Gehlot is an Indian politician and a senior-leader of the Bharatiya Janata Party (BJP) in the State of Rajasthan. He is the Member of Parliament in Rajya Sabha from Rajasthan since June 2020. He was elected to the Rajasthan Legislative Assembly from Sardarpura as a member of the Bharatiya Janata Party.

He has been active in public life in Rajasthan, particularly in Jodhpur. During the 1975–77 Emergency in India, he was imprisoned for participating in anti Emergency political activities.
