= 2022 Rajasthan political crisis =

Cabinet crisis in Indian state of Rajasthan

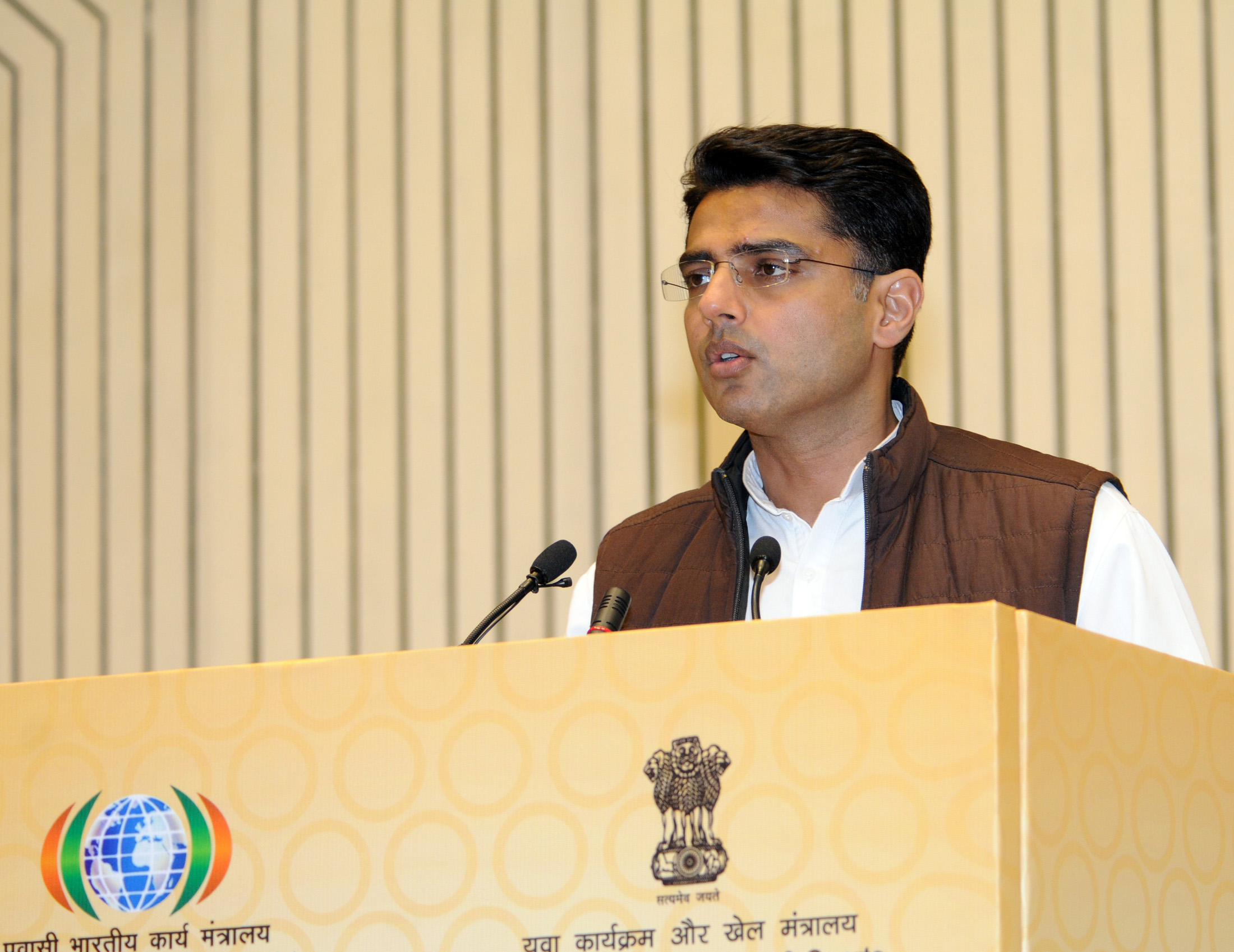
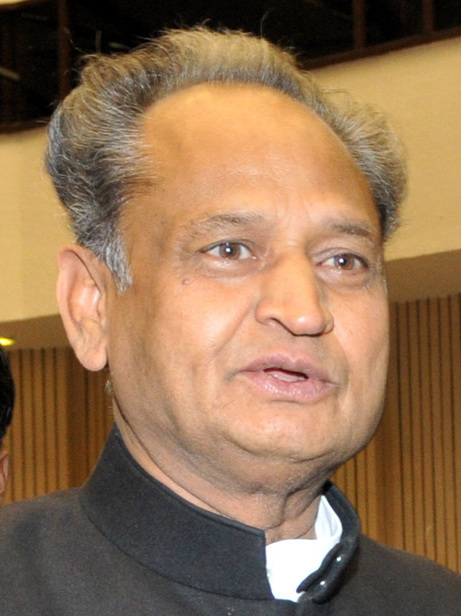
- Sachin Pilot (left), Ashok Gehlot (right)
- Date: 25 September 2022 – 5 October 2022
- Location: Rajasthan, India
- Type: Parliamentary crisis
- Cause: Series of disputes between Ashok Gehlot and Sachin Pilot
- Participants: Indian National Congress (INC); Independent MLAs
- Outcome: Ashok Gehlot remained Chief Minister of Rajasthan, and the MLAs decided to withdraw their resignation.

On 25 September 2022 at around 9 PM (IST), 82 MLAs of the Indian National Congress supporting Ashok Gehlot, Chief Minister of Rajasthan suddenly went to Speaker of the House, C. P. Joshi's residence in Jaipur and gave their resignation to oppose the decision of making Sachin Pilot as Chief Minister of Rajasthan.

It was the second time in the term of the Third Gehlot ministry, the rival factions of the Rajasthan Pradesh Congress Committee, started a governmental crisis in the state of Rajasthan.

== Background ==
On 24 September 2022, Chief Minister of Rajasthan, Ashok Gehlot expressed his wish to file nomination for upcoming elections for becoming President of the Indian National Congress. After which Gehlot suggested the name of C. P. Joshi for the post of Chief Minister to senior Congress leaders. Following his wish, the party had made clear the decision of 'One Person, One Post', so Gehlot has to resign as the Chief Minister. Instead of Gehlot, senior Congress leaders Ajay Maken and Mallikarjun Kharge decided to appoint Sachin Pilot as next Chief Minister of Rajasthan. But Ashok Gehlot supporting MLAs were not ready to support that decision and decided to give their resignation as MLAs. On 25 September 2022, at around 9 PM (IST), almost 82 MLAs reached the residence of C. P. Joshi, Speaker of the Rajasthan Legislative Assembly in Jaipur and submitted their resignation. However, their resignation were not accepted by the Speaker. A similar crisis, happened in July 2020, in which Sachin Pilot, was removed as Deputy Chief Minister of Rajasthan, President of the Rajasthan Pradesh Congress Committee and various other posts. But the situation was managed by the interference of Rahul Gandhi and Sonia Gandhi. Following the resignation, in late night, Congress President Sonia Gandhi has directed Ajay Maken and Mallikarjun Kharge to return Delhi to tackle the situation. Also, AICC members requested Sonia Gandhi to pull Ashok Gehlot out of party president race. On 26 September 2022, a meeting was held in the residence of Sonia Gandhi to discuss the situation of the state. On the other hand, President of Bharatiya Janata Party, Rajasthan, Satish Poonia said that "Congress should do 'Congress Jodo Yatra' before 'Bharat Jodo Yatra'". Following the meeting of Sonia Gandhi, former Chief Minister of Madhya Pradesh Kamal Nath was sent to Jaipur for talks with MLAs. Many political commentators and media thought that Ashok Gehlot faction MLA Shanti Kumar Dhariwal played an important role in the political crisis. Although both Gehlot and Pilot are silent on the crisis and not given any official statement on it. On 29 September 2022, after meeting with Sonia Gandhi, Gehlot took the decision not to contest the Congress presidential election and to continue as Chief Minister of Rajasthan. However, secretary of the party, K. C. Venugopal said that the party will take a decision on the post of Chief Minister of Rajasthan within 2 days.

== See also ==
- 2020 Rajasthan political crisis
- 2020 Madhya Pradesh political crisis
- 2018 Rajasthan Legislative Assembly election
