= Amber Assembly constituency =

Legislative Assembly constituency in Rajasthan State, India

Coordinates: 26.99°N 75.88°E

Amber
- Constituency No. 47 for the Rajasthan Legislative Assembly

Constituency details
- Country: India
- Region: North India
- State: Rajasthan
- District: Jaipur
- Lok Sabha constituency: Jaipur Rural
- Established: 1951
- Total electors: 289,646
- Reservation: None

Member of Legislative Assembly
- 16th Rajasthan Legislative Assembly
- Incumbent Prashant Sharma
- Party: Indian National Congress
- Elected year: 2023

Amber Assembly constituency is one of the 200 Legislative Assembly constituencies of Rajasthan state in India. It is in Jaipur district and is one of the eight assembly segments of Jaipur Rural Lok Sabha constituency.

== Members of Assembly ==
| Year | Member | Party |
|---|---|---|
| 1952 | Maha Rawal Sangram Singh | Independent |
| 1952 | Kuwar Tej Singh | Ram Rajya Parishad |
| 1954^ | Angad Ram | Indian National Congress |
| 1954^ | Kamla Beniwal | Indian National Congress |
| 1957 | Hari Shankar S. Shastri | Indian National Congress |
| 1957 | Shahdeo | Indian National Congress |
| 1962 | Rawat Man Singh | Swatantra Party |
| 1967 | Shahdeo | Swatantra Party |
| 1972 | Shakuntla | Indian National Congress |
| 1977 | Pushpa | Janata Party |
| 1980 | Pushpa | Bharatiya Janata Party |
| 1985 | Bhairon Singh Shekhawat | Bharatiya Janata Party |
| 1985^ | R. P. Katariya | Indian National Congress |
| 1990 | Gopi Ram | Bharatiya Janata Party |
| 1993 | Gopi Ram | Bharatiya Janata Party |
| 1998 | Sahadev Sharma | Indian National Congress |
| 2003 | Lal Chand Kataria | Indian National Congress |
| 2008 | Ganga Sahay Sharma | Indian National Congress |
| 2013 | Naveen Pilania | National People's Party |
| 2018 | Satish Poonia | Bharatiya Janata Party |
| 2023 | Prashant Sharma | Indian National Congress |

== Election results ==
=== 2023 ===
2023 Rajasthan Legislative Assembly election: Amber
| Party | Candidate | Votes | % | ±% |
|---|---|---|---|---|
| INC | Prashant Sharma | 108,914 | 48.04 | +8.01 |
| BJP | Satish Poonia | 99,822 | 44.03 | −2.66 |
| RLP | Vinod Jat | 4,326 | 1.91 | |
| Independent | Raj Kumar Sharma | 2,585 | 1.14 | |
| Independent | Om Prakash Saini | 2,202 | 0.97 | |
| NOTA | None of the above | 1,106 | 0.49 | −0.35 |
| Majority | | 9,092 | 4.01 | −2.65 |
| Turnout | | 226,724 | 78.28 | −2.3 |
| INC gain from BJP | | Swing | | |

=== 2018 ===
Rajasthan Legislative Assembly Election, 2018: Amber
| Party | Candidate | Votes | % | ±% |
|---|---|---|---|---|
| BJP | Satish Poonia | 93,132 | 46.69 | |
| INC | Prashant Sharma | 79,856 | 40.03 | |
| BSP | Navin Pilaniya | 15,994 | 8.02 | |
| NOTA | None of the above | 1,678 | 0.84 | |
| Majority | | 13,276 | 6.66 | |
| Turnout | | 199,484 | 80.58 | |

=== 1985 ===
- Ram partap Katariya (INC) : 30,334 votes
- G.Ram (BJP) : 27,949

=== 1951 ===
- Kr. Tej Singh (RRP) : 10,666 votes. For one of the two members to be elected from Amber.
- (Losing candidate) Ram Niwas (INC) : 9,202

== See also ==
- List of constituencies of the Rajasthan Legislative Assembly
- Jaipur district
