= Bansur Assembly constituency =

Legislative Assembly constituency in Rajasthan State, India

Coordinates: 27.68°N 76.35°E

Bansur
- Constituency No. 63 for the Rajasthan Legislative Assembly

Constituency details
- Country: India
- Region: North India
- State: Rajasthan
- District: Kotputli-Behror
- Lok Sabha constituency: Jaipur Rural
- Established: 1951
- Total electors: 254,753
- Reservation: None

Member of Legislative Assembly
- 16th Rajasthan Legislative Assembly
- Incumbent Devi Singh Shekhawat
- Party: Bhartiya Janta Party

Bansur Assembly constituency is one of the 200 Legislative Assembly constituencies of Rajasthan state in India. It is part of Alwar district. As of 2023, its representative is Devi Singh Shekhawat of the Bhartiya Janata Party. Bansur assembly constituency is considered as gurjar dominant. And the number of gurjar voters in this seat is around 50 thousand.

== Members of the Legislative Assembly ==
Election	Name	Party
1977	Hari Singh Yadav	Janata Party
1980	Badri Prasad	Indian National Congress
1985	Jagat Singh Dayma	Lok Dal
1990	Jagat Singh Dayma	Janata Dal
1993	Rohitashwa Kumar	Independent politician
1998	Jagat Singh Dayma	Bahujan Samaj Party
2003	Mahipal Yadav	Indian National Congress
2008	Rohitash Kumar	Bharatiya Janata Party
2013	Shakuntala Rawat	Indian National Congress
2018	Shakuntala Rawat	Indian National Congress
2023	Devi Singh Shekhawat	Bharatiya Janata Party

== Election results ==
=== 2023 ===
Rajasthan Legislative Assembly Election, 2023: Bansur
Party	Candidate	Votes	%	±%
BJP	Devi Singh Shekhawat	61,605	33.84	+7.59
ASP(KR)	Rohitash Kumar	54,185	29.77	
INC	Shakuntala Rawat	45,639	25.07	−13.91
BSP	Mukesh	12,580	6.91	
Independent	Neeta Bai	6,394	3.51	
NOTA	None of the above	1,623	0.89	−0.28
Majority		7,420	4.07	−6.57
Turnout		182,026	71.45	−3.92
BJP hold		Swing		

=== 2018 ===
Rajasthan Legislative Assembly Election, 2018: Bansur
Party	Candidate	Votes	%	±%
INC	Shakuntala Rawat	65,656	38.98	
Independent	Devi Singh Shekhawat	47,736	28.34	
BJP	Mahendra Kumar Yadav	44,226	26.25	
SP	Mukesh	3,122	1.85	
NOTA	None of the above	1,966	1.17	
Majority		17,920	10.64	
Turnout		168,451	75.37	
INC hold		Swing		

== See also ==
- List of constituencies of the Rajasthan Legislative Assembly
- Alwar district
