= Rajyavardhan Singh Rathore =

Indian politician

Colonel (Retd.) Rajyavardhan Singh Rathore AVSM OLY
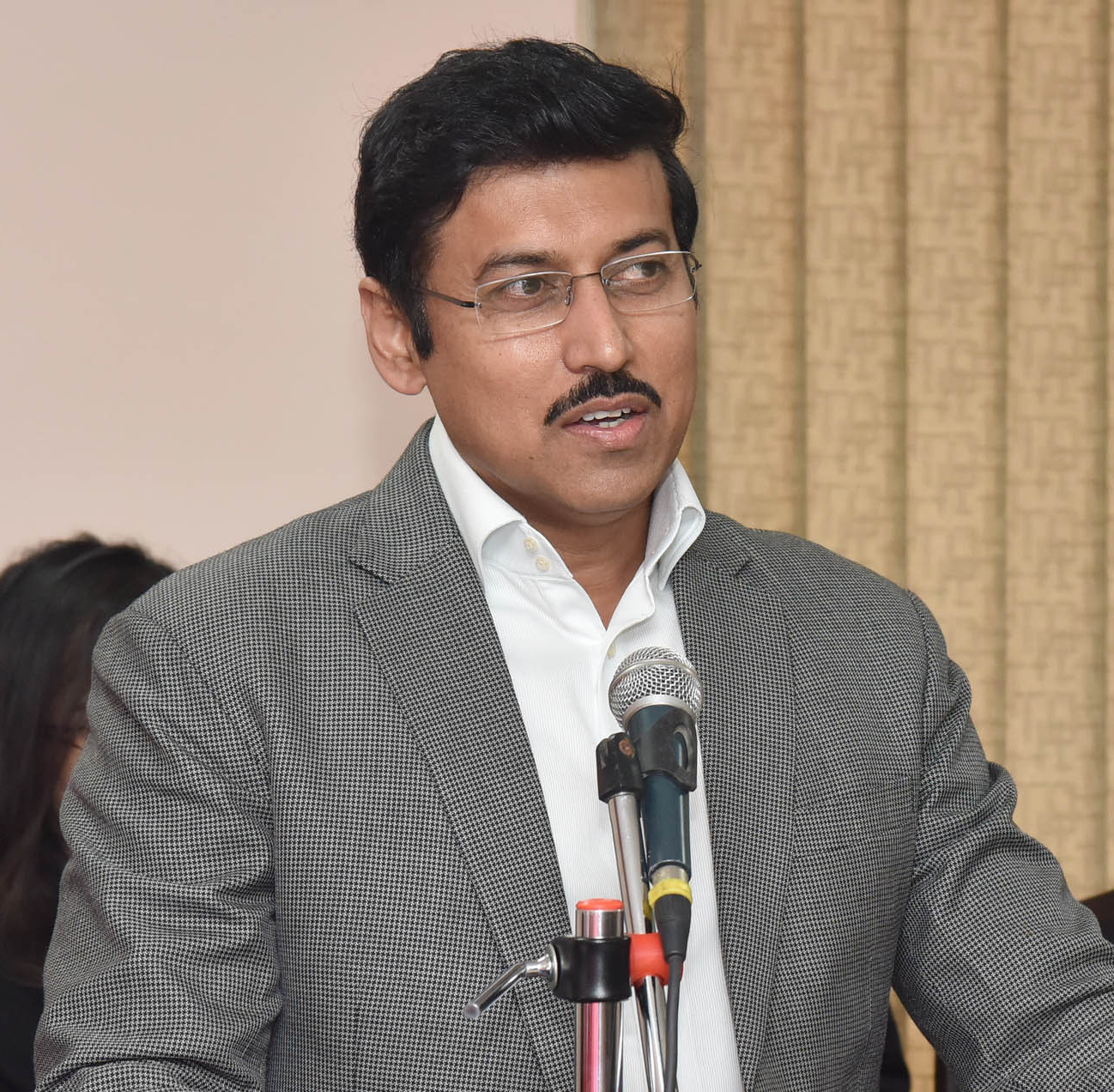
- Rathore in 2017

Cabinet Minister, Government of Rajasthan
- Incumbent
- Assumed office 30 December 2023
- Governor: Haribhau Bagade
- Chief Minister: Bhajan Lal Sharma
- Ministry and Departments: List: *Industry and Commerce; Information Technology and Communication; Youth Affairs and Sports; Skill Planning and Entrepreneurship; Sainik Welfare
- Preceded by: Shakuntala Rawat

Member of the Rajasthan Legislative Assembly
- Incumbent
- Assumed office 3 December 2023
- Preceded by: Lalchand Kataria
- Constituency: Jhotwara
- Majority: 50,167

Minister of State (Independent Charge) for Youth Affairs and Sports
- In office 3 September 2017 – 30 May 2019
- Prime Minister: Narendra Modi
- Preceded by: Vijay Goel
- Succeeded by: Kiren Rijiju

Minister of State (Independent Charge) for Information and Broadcasting
- In office 9 November 2014 – 24 May 2018

Minister of Information and Broadcasting
- In office 24 May 2018 – 24 May 2019
- Prime Minister: Narendra Modi
- Preceded by: Smriti Irani
- Succeeded by: Prakash Javadekar

Member of Parliament, Lok Sabha
- In office 16 May 2014 – 6 December 2023
- Preceded by: Lalchand Kataria
- Succeeded by: Rao Rajendra Singh
- Constituency: Jaipur Rural
- Majority: 332,896 (32.84%)

Personal details
- Born: 29 January 1970 (age 56) Jaisalmer, Rajasthan, India
- Party: Bharatiya Janata Party
- Height: 183 cm (6 ft 0 in)
- Spouse: Gayatri Rathore (m. 1997)
- Children: 2
- Education: National Defence Academy, Pune; Indian Military Academy, Dehradun
- Website: rajyavardhanrathore.in

Military service
- Allegiance: India
- Branch/service: Indian Army
- Years of service: 1990 – 2013
- Rank: Colonel
- Unit: 9th Grenadiers
- Battles/wars: Kargil War; CI/CT operations in Jammu and Kashmir
- Awards: Padma Shri; Ati Vishisht Seva Medal; Khel Ratna Award
- Sports career
- Sport: Shooting
- Event: Double trap
Medal record
Men's shooting
Representing India
Event	1st	2nd	3rd
Olympic Games	–	1	–
Commonwealth Games	3	1	–
Asian Games	-	1	1
World Shotgun Championship	-	-	1
ISSF World Shooting Championship	1	1	2
Asian Clay Target Championship	5	-	-
Total	9	4	4
Olympic Games
Silver medal – second place	2004 Athens	Double trap
Commonwealth Games
Gold medal – first place	2002 Manchester	Double trap individual
Gold medal – first place	2002 Manchester	Double trap pairs
Gold medal – first place	2006 Melbourne	Double trap individual
Silver medal – second place	2006 Melbourne	Double trap pairs
Asian Games
Silver medal – second place	2006 Doha	Double trap teams
Bronze medal – third place	2006 Doha	Double trap
World Shotgun Championship
Bronze medal – third place	2003 Cyprus	Double trap individual
ISSF World Shooting Championship
Bronze medal – third place	2006 Granada	Double trap individual
Silver medal – second place	2004 Sydney	Double trap individual
Gold medal – first place	2006 Cairo	Double trap individual
Bronze medal – third place	2003 New Delhi	Double trap individual
Asian Clay Target Championship
Gold medal – first place	2003 New Delhi	Double trap individual
Gold medal – first place	2004 Bangkok	Double trap individual
Gold medal – first place	2005 Bangkok	Double trap individual
Gold medal – first place	2006 Singapore	Double trap individual
Gold medal – first place	2011 Kuala Lumpur	Double trap individual
- Minister of State: 24 May 2018 – 24 May 2019: Minister of State (Independent Charge) for Information and Broadcasting; 3 September 2017 – 24 May 2019:Minister of State (Independent Charge) for Youth Affairs and Sports; 9 November 2014 – 24 May 2018: Minister of State for Information and Broadcasting

Rajyavardhan Singh Rathore (born 29 January 1970) is an Indian politician, Olympic medallist in shooting and retired colonel in the Indian Army. He is serving as a cabinet minister at the Industry & Commerce, Youth Affairs & Sports Department in the Government of Rajasthan since December 2023. Rathore was a Member of Parliament in the Lok Sabha from Jaipur Rural seat since 2014 till 2023.

He won 25 international medals at various championships for double trap shooting including a silver medal at the 2004 Summer Olympics in the men's double trap event.

Rathore served as a commissioned officer in The Grenadiers regiment of the Indian Army before retiring in 2013 as a colonel. Following his retirement from the army and shooting, he also acted in some advertisements and tv shows after that he later became a member of the parliament for the Bharatiya Janata Party in 2014.

In November 2014, Rathore was appointed as the Minister of State for Information and Broadcasting. He served as a Cabinet Minister (Independent Charge) for the Ministry of Youth Affairs and Sports from 2017 to 2019 until 2019. As of 2025, he serves in the Government of Rajasthan, holding the portfolios of Industry and Commerce, Youth Affairs and Sports, Information Technology and Communications, Military Welfare, and Planning and Entrepreneurship.

== Personal life ==
Rajyavardhan was born in Jaisalmer, Rajasthan to Colonel Lakshman Singh Rathore (Retd.), an Army Colonel of Garabdesar, Lunkaransar, Bikaner, and Manju Raghav Bhondsi, a teacher, on 29 January 1970.

His educational qualifications include B.A., Instructor-Weapons (MMG, AGL, Small Arms), Grading Tactics (YO) Course. He was educated at the National Defence Academy, Pune and Infantry School, Mhow.

He married Maj. Gayatri Rathore (nee Kapkoti), hailing from Kapkot-Almora in Uttarakhand, on 16 February 1997. She served as a doctor by profession in the Indian Army. They have a son and a daughter.

== Military career ==
Rathore is a graduate of the 77th Course of the National Defence Academy. After graduating from the NDA, Rathore attended the Indian Military Academy where he was awarded the Sword of Honor for the best all-round Gentleman Cadet. He was also the recipient of the Sikh Regiment Gold Medal, awarded to the best sportsman of the course.

He was later commissioned in the 64th Cavalry on 15 December 1990, and transferred to 9 Grenadiers on 28 February 1992. He was promoted to lieutenant on 15 December 1992 and to captain on 15 December 1995. Rathore fought in the Kargil War, and was promoted to major on 15 December 2000. As part of his career in the Indian Army, he served in Jammu and Kashmir, where he participated in counter-terrorist operations. His regiment was awarded the Army Chief's Citation and the Governor of J&K's Citation for exemplary work. He was promoted to lieutenant-colonel on 16 December 2004, and to his final rank of colonel on 1 May 2009.

== Sports career ==
At the 2002 Commonwealth Games in Manchester, Rathore won a gold medal and set a new Commonwealth Games Record of 192 targets out of 200, which still stands. He also won the Team Gold Medal along with Moraad Ali Khan. Rathore went on to successfully defend his Commonwealth Champion title by winning the gold medal at the Melbourne Commonwealth Games in 2006. He also won the silver in the Team event with Vikram Bhatnagar. He won gold medals in two World Shooting Championships, at Sydney in 2004 and Cairo in 2006. In addition to these achievements, Rathore won a silver medal at the Olympic Games, a bronze medal at the World Championships, a bronze medal at the World Cup Final, and two gold medals and a bronze medal at the World Cup. He also secured five gold medals and a bronze medal at the Asian Championships and a bronze medal at the Asian Games. Altogether, Rathore has amassed a total of 13 medals in his sports career.

Rathore rose to prominence when he won the silver at the 2004 Athens Olympics. It was India's first ever individual silver at the Olympics.

In 2006, Rathore won a bronze medal in the World Championship in Spain, an event held for the top 12 shooters of the world. He was ranked third in the world for the most of 2003 and 2004 and briefly climbed to the first in early 2004 and second after the Athens Olympics. He won a silver at the World Championship in 2003 in Sydney for India after a gap of nearly 40 years. India had not seen a victory since Karni Singh of Bikaner, who won a silver at the 1962 World shooting Championship in Cairo. Rathore is credited with winning the Asian Clay Target gold medal four times in a row from 2003 to 2006. He also holds an Individual bronze medal which was at the Asian Games 2006 in Doha.

Between 2002 and 2006 he won 25 international medals at various championships for Double Trap.

In 2011, Rathore participated in the Asian Clay Target Championship in Kuala Lumpur and won gold. His score of 194 in that tournament equals world record.

== Political career ==
On 10 September 2013, Rathore joined the Bharatiya Janata Party following his retirement from the Indian Army. He was elected as an MP in the 2014 Lok Sabha election from Jaipur Rural constituency. On the ninth of November 2014, he was sworn-in as the Minister of State for Information & Broadcasting, under the Narendra Modi government. He was appointed the Minister of Sports on 3 September 2017. In May 2018, he became Minister of State (I/C) for Information & Broadcasting. In the 2019 Indian general election, he retained the Jaipur Rural seat by over 3.93 lakh votes and was elected to the Lok Sabha for the second time.

In November 2023, Rathore contested from Jhotwara Assembly constituency for the 2023 Rajasthan Legislative Assembly election. He defeated Abhishek Chaudhary of the INC by 50,167 votes. After winning the elections, Rathore resigned from Lok Sabha. On 30 December 2023, he took oath as a cabinet minister in the Government of Rajasthan.

== Awards and recognitions ==
- 2005 – Padma Shri
- 2004–2005 – the Major Dhyan Chand Khel Ratna Award (Highest Sporting Honour of India).
- 2003–2004 – Arjuna Award
- Ati Vishisht Seva Medal (AVSM), military award for exceptional service, presented by the President of India on behalf of the Government of India.
- Rathore was the chosen flag bearer for India during the 2008 Summer Olympics in Beijing, China.
- Rathore was the chosen flag bearer for India during the 2006 Commonwealth Games in Melbourne, Australia
- 1990 – the Sword of Honour (For the Best All Round Officer Cadet at the Indian Military Academy).
- 1990 – the Sikh Regiment Gold Medal (For the Best Sportsmen at the Indian Military Academy).
- 1989 – the "Blazer" (Highest sports award at the National Defence Academy, Pune, India).

=== Military awards ===

Padma Shri		Ati Vishist Seva Medal	
Special Service Medal	Operation Vijay Star	Operation Vijay Medal	
Sainya Seva Medal	50th Anniversary of Independence Medal	20 Years Long Service Medal	9 Years Long Service Medal

Lok Sabha
Preceded by Lalchand Kataria	Member of Parliament for Jaipur Rural; 2014 – 2023	Succeeded by Rao Rajendra Singh
Political offices
Preceded by Smriti Irani	Minister of Information and Broadcasting; 14 May 2018 – 31 May 2019; Minister of State with Independent Charge	Succeeded by Prakash Javadekar

Olympic Games
Preceded by Leander Paes	Flagbearer for India; Beijing 2008	Succeeded by Sushil Kumar
