= Shakuntala Rawat =

Indian politician

Minister of Industry & State Enterprise Devasthan Government of Rajasthan
- In office 21 November 2021 – 3 December 2023
- Preceded by: Parsadi Lal Meena
- Succeeded by: Rajyavardhan Singh Rathore

Member of the Rajasthan Legislative Assembly
- In office 2013–2023
- Preceded by: Rohitash Kumar Sharma
- Succeeded by: Devi Singh Shekhawat
- Constituency: Bansur

Personal details
- Born: 14 November 1968 (age 57) Alwar, Rajasthan, India
- Party: Indian National Congress
- Spouse: Vishwa Kumar Rawat
- Occupation: Politician
- Nickname: Madam

Shakuntala Rawat (born 14 November 1966) is an Indian politician and the Former Cabinet Minister Of Industry State Enterprise Devasthan Department under the Government of Rajasthan. She was Member of Legislative Assembly of Rajasthan from Bansur, Alwar, Rajasthan, and was the Former President of State, Women Congress Committee of Rajasthan after which she became the Former General Secretary, All India Women Congress.
