= Rajakhera Assembly constituency =

Legislative Assembly constituency in Rajasthan State, India

Coordinates: 26.9°N 78.17°E

Rajakhera
- Constituency No. 80 for the Rajasthan Legislative Assembly

Constituency details
- Country: India
- Region: North India
- State: Rajasthan
- Division: Bharatpur
- District: Dholpur
- Lok Sabha constituency: Karauli-Dholpur
- Established: 1972
- Total electors: 214,923
- Reservation: None

Member of Legislative Assembly
- 16th Rajasthan Legislative Assembly
- Incumbent Rohit Bohra
- Party: Indian National Congress
- Elected year: 2023

Rajakhera Assembly constituency is one of the 200 Legislative Assembly constituencies of Rajasthan state in India.

It is part of Dholpur district.

== Members of the Legislative Assembly ==
Election	Member	Party
2008	Ravindra Singh Bohara	Bharatiya Janata Party
2013	Pradhymn Singh	Indian National Congress
2018	Rohit Bohra	Indian National Congress
2023	Rohit Bohra	Indian National Congress

== Election results ==
=== 2023 ===
Rajasthan Legislative Assembly Election, 2023: Rajakhera
Party	Candidate	Votes	%	±%
INC	Rohit Bohra	89,120	53.26	+0.15
BJP	Neerja Sharma	73,563	43.97	+1.3
NOTA	None of the above	1,513	0.9	−0.27
Majority		15,557	9.29	−1.15
Turnout		167,315	77.85	+4.43
INC hold		Swing		

=== 2018 ===
Rajasthan Legislative Assembly Election, 2018: Rajakhera
Party	Candidate	Votes	%	±%
INC	Rohit Bohra	76,278	53.11	
BJP	Ashok Sharma	61,287	42.67	
BSP	Priyanka Devi	1,511	1.05	
NOTA	None of the above	1,683	1.17	
Majority		14,991	10.44	
Turnout		143,625	73.42	

== See also ==
- List of constituencies of the Rajasthan Legislative Assembly
- Dholpur district
