= Sardarpura =

- Village
- Location within Rajasthan Location within India
- Coordinates: 26.2773°N 73.0120°E
- Country: India
- State: Rajasthan
- District: Jodhpur district
- Language: Rajasthani, Hindi & Shekhawati
- Elevation: 279 m (915 ft)

Population (2011)
  - Total: 1,695
- Time zone: UTC+5:30 (IST)
- PIN: 331305
- Telephone code: 91-1559

Sardarpura is a village of the Tehsil Rajgarh (Rajasthan). It is situated at Latitude (28.524813), Longitude (75.512563) or +28° 31' 29.33" North, +75° 30' 45.23 East. According to the census of India 2011, Sardarpura has the total population 1,797, where male population 1003, female population 797, and number of households are 308.
