= Commerce College, Jaipur =

University Commerce College
- College
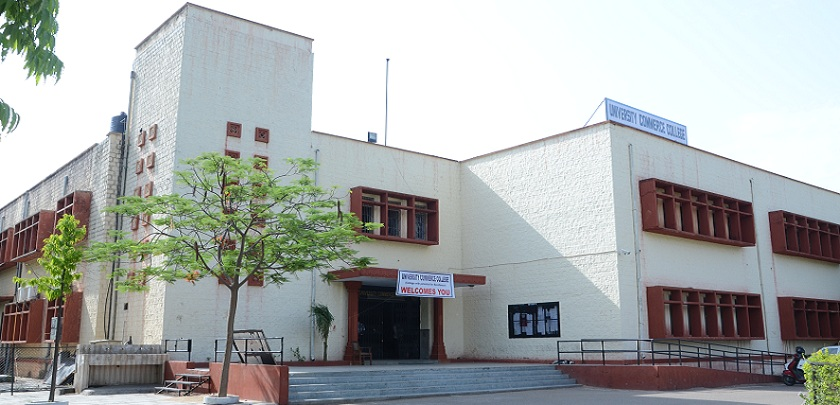
- Front of college
- Motto: धर्मो विश्वस्य जगत: प्रतिष्ठा
- Location within Rajasthan Location within India
- Coordinates: 26.877092°N 75.8115934°E
- Country: India
- State: Rajasthan
- District: Jaipur

Government
  - Vice Chancellor: Professor R. K. Kothari
  - Principal: Bhawani Shanker Sharma
  - President: Sanjeev Singh
  - General Secretary: Dhiraj Godiwal

Languages
  - Official: Hindi
  - Spoken: Hindi, English
- Time zone: UTC+5:30 (IST)
- PIN: 302004
- Telephone code: 0141 2710483
- Website: www.universitycommercecollege.ac.in

University Commerce College (Hindi: विश्वविद्यालय वाणिज्य महाविद्यालय, Vishvavidyālaya Vāṇijya Mahāvidyālaya) is a college in Jaipur city in Rajasthan state in India. It is one of the five constituent colleges of University of Rajasthan. The college offers undergraduate courses in commerce. It is situated on Jawahar Lal Nehru Road . The college is also known as University Commerce College. Maharana Pratap Hostel a University hostel is associated hostel of the college.

The University Commerce College is one of the biggest in Rajasthan, with more than 4,000 students. Apart from traditional courses like B. Com (Pass Course) and B.Com (Hons.) the College has gained prominence in recent years in running professional courses - BBA and BCA. The opening of Bhartiya Chintan Anusandhan Kendra in December, 2015 is one of the greatest achievements of the college in recent years.

This center has about 1700 books on Life and Thoughts of Indian Thinkers as well as Indian Scriptures. Videos on life, contributions, speeches of eminent Indian Thinkers are also available in the center.

== National & International Seminars and Conferences ==
The College has organised the All-India Commerce Conference twice, in 1977 and 1995. It also successfully organized various National & International Seminars and Conferences such as:

- “Changing Perspectives in Management Education” (2004),
- “Globalisation and Changing Business Environment in India”(2004),
- “Globalisation: Myth or Reality?” (2005),
- “Emerging Issues in Commerce and Management” (2006),
- “Corporate Governance and Ethical Issues in Changing Economic Scenario” (2009),
- “Professional Orientation of Business Education” (2010),
- “International Seminar on “Rural Marketing”(2010),
- “National Seminar on “MNREGA: Opportunities and Challenges” (2011),
- “National Seminar on “Emerging Issues in Tourism: Opportunities and Challenges”( 2015)

The college organised a National Seminar on GST Issues and challenges in India in the month of January, 2018. In addition, the college organised many seminars and special lectures in the session 2017-18 to enrich the knowledge of the students. In the month of December, 2016 Diamond Jubilee Celebration was organised in which different students activities like quiz contest, power point presentation and lectures were organised. Foundation Day was also organised on 14 December 2017.

== Specialties and achievements ==
The College has two big play grounds. It also has three A.C. Computer Labs having 77 computers. The college has a smart classroom and a language lab.

== Sports ==
During 2017-18 students of the college participated in all of the inter-college tournaments organised by the University of Rajasthan and secured second position in zudo. Many of the students are selected in university teams to participate in the inter-university tournaments, namely in cricket, zudo, handball, hockey, shooting, volleyball, and football.
