= Khejroli =

- Village
- Location in Rajasthan, India
- Coordinates: 27°22′N 75°34′E
- Country: India
- State: Rajasthan
- District: Jaipur
- Elevation: 480 m (1,570 ft)

Population (2019)
  - Total: 75,000
- Postal code: 303803
- Website: www.khejroli.com

Khejroli is a village and a village panchayat in Jaipur district, Rajasthan located 45 km away from its district headquarters Jaipur . It consists of approximately 25 temples. This is one of the big villages in Jaipur district, it consists of 40 wards of panchayat. Its tehsil is Chomu and Panchayat Samiti is Govindgarh. Vidhan shabha seat is Shahpura. Lok sabha seat is jaipur rural. There are many schools both of types government and private level.

== Demographics ==
As of 2011 India census, Khejroli had total population of 16,531 people which consists of 8,562 males and 7,969 females. Among the population 9,924 (60%) people are educated consisting of 6,094 males and 3,830 females. In Khejroli, 16% of the population is under 6 years of age.
