= Manish Yadav =

Indian politician

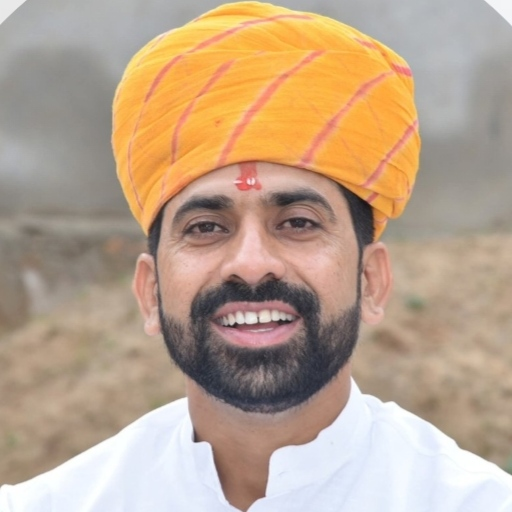

Member of the Rajasthan Legislative Assembly
- Incumbent
- Assumed office December 2023
- Preceded by: Alok Beniwal
- Constituency: Shahpura

Personal details
- Party: Indian National Congress

Manish Yadav is an Indian politician belonging to the Indian National Congress. He is serving as the member of Rajasthan Legislative Assembly representing the Shahpura, Jaipur constituent assembly.

== Political career ==
He won the 2023 Legislative Assembly elections by defeating Alok Beniwal by 64908 votes, the MLA of Shahpura since 2018. He is the former National Secretary of NSUI and former Students' Union President of Rajasthan University.
