= Naveen Pilania =

Indian politician

Member of the Rajasthan Legislative Assembly
- In office December 2013 – December 2018
- Constituency: Amber, Rajasthan

Personal details
- Born: 15 July 1966 (age 59) Bulandshahr, Uttar Pradesh, India
- Party: Bahujan Samaj Party
- Other political affiliations: National People's Party (India)
- Parent: Gyan Prakash Pilania
- Education: Bachelor of Engineering
- Alma mater: Jodhpur University

Naveen Pilania (born 15 July 1966) is an Indian politician. He was elected to the 14th Rajasthan Legislative Assembly from Amber, Rajasthan. He is a member of the Bahujan Samaj Party. He did Bachelor of Engineering in Mechanical from Jodhpur University in 1988. He is son of Gyan Prakash Pilania, former member of Rajya Sabha and former DGP of Rajasthan.
