= Rajpal Singh Shekhawat =

Indian politician (born 1962)

Member of the Rajasthan Legislative Assembly
- In office 1990-92, 1993-98, 2008-2013, 2013 – 2018

Personal details
- Born: 12 November 1962 (age 63) Pachar, Sikar, Rajasthan
- Party: Bharatiya Janata Party

Rajpal Singh Shekhawat (born 12 November 1962, Pachar, Sikar) is an Indian politician and former Member of the Rajasthan Legislative Assembly from Jhotwara & Banipark in Jaipur.

He was first inducted as Minister by Bhairon Singh Shekhawat and had a number of portfolios. During Vasundhara Raje's government, he was the Minister for Urban Delopment, Industries, Public enterprises, DMIC & NRI affairs. He is a leader of Bharatiya Janata Party.
