= University of Rajasthan =

State university in Jaipur, Rajasthan

- Official seal of University of Rajasthan
- Other name: Rajasthan University (RU)
- Former name: University of Rajputana
- Motto: IAST: Dharmo Vishwasya Jagatah Pratishtha
- Motto in English: Dharma Is the Root of the Prestige of the Whole World
- Type: Public research university
- Established: 1947; 79 years ago
- Accreditation: NAAC
- Affiliations: UGC; AIU
- Chancellor: Governor of Rajasthan
- Vice-Chancellor: Dr. Bhagwati Prasad Saraswat
- Visitor: President of India
- Students: 125,000
- Undergraduates: 56000
- Postgraduates: 18000
- Doctoral students: 1000
- Location: Jawahar Lal Nehru Marg, Rajasthan University Campus, Talvandi, Jaipur, Rajasthan 302004, Jaipur, Rajasthan, 302004, India; 26.8886°N 75.8140°E
- Campus: 503.91 acres (203.93 ha); Urban
- Language: Hindi, English
- Website: www.uniraj.ac.in
- Location in Jaipur Location in Rajasthan Location in India

The University of Rajasthan, informally known as Rajasthan University (RU, ISO: Rājasthān Viśvavidyālaya), is a public state university located in Jaipur, Rajasthan, India. It was founded in 1947 by an Act of the State Legislative Assembly and is recognised as a prominent institution in the region. Rajasthan University is one of the largest university systems in the state, north India and the country with over 100,000 students on its campuses and affiliated colleges. The University of Rajasthan is accredited at 'A++' Grade by NAAC Bengaluru, with a CGPA of 3.66. The Governor of Rajasthan serves as the university chancellor.

== Campus ==
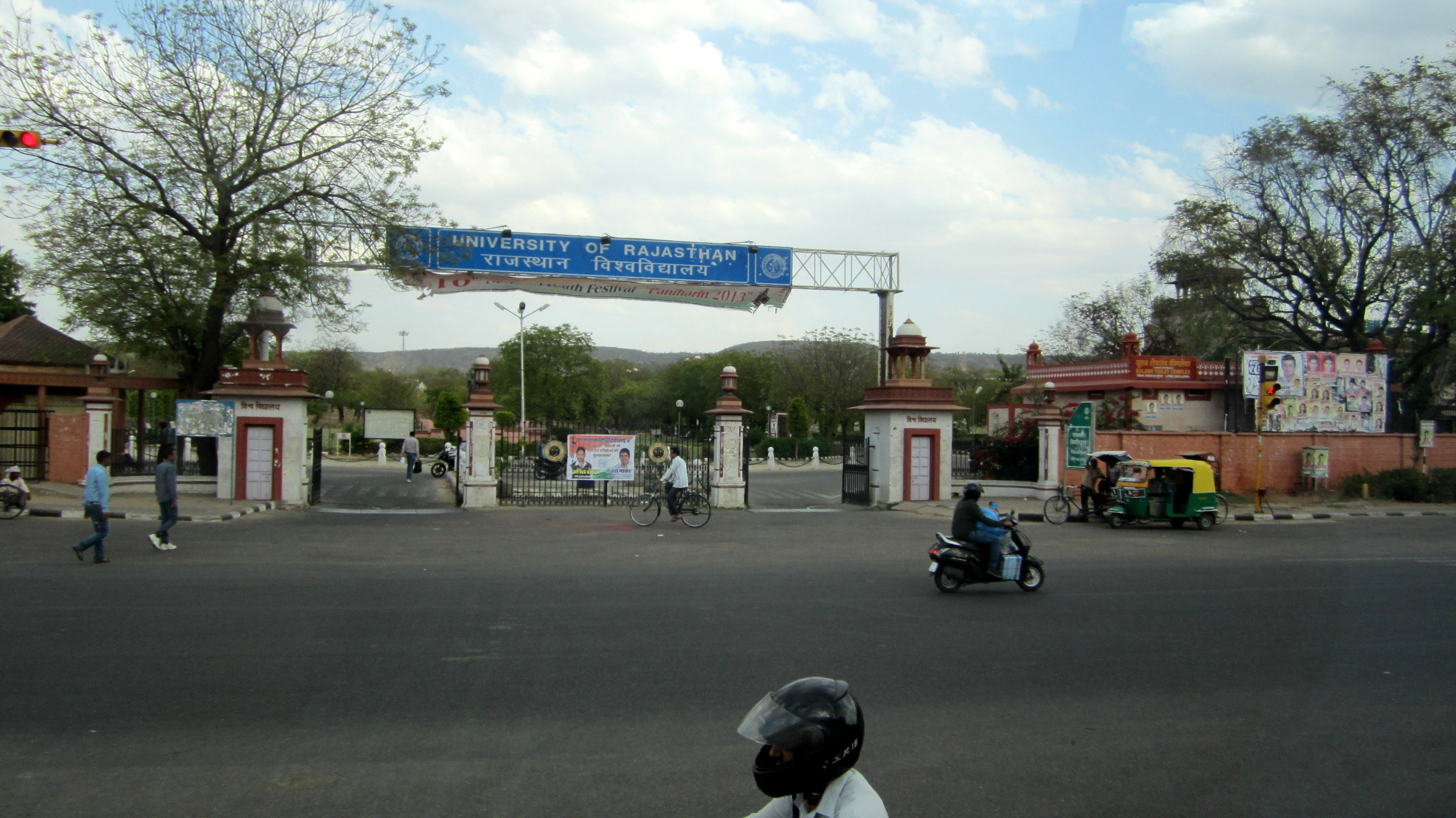
Entrance gate of Rajasthan University

Spread in approximately 285.29 hectares (705.0 acres) on Jawaharlal Nehru Marg, also known as the central spine of Jaipur, the central campus incubates various departments, libraries, sports complexes etc. Many sports are organized every year in the university. The university has always accorded a high priority to games and sports. The university has a modern sports complex, and also a swimming pool, the latter has been the venue of many national swimming meets and inter university-national tournaments.

== Organisation and administration ==
=== Faculties ===
- Faculty of Arts
- Faculty of Commerce
- Faculty of Education
- Faculty of Engineering and Technology
- Faculty of Fine Arts
- Faculty of Law
- Faculty of Management
- Faculty of Science
- Faculty of Social Science

=== Constituent colleges ===
- University Commerce College
- University Five Year Law College
- University Law College
- University Law College II
- University Maharaja College
- University Maharani College
- University Rajasthan College

=== Affiliated colleges ===
Its jurisdiction extends over the two districts Dausa and Jaipur. As of 2024, University of Rajasthan has a network of 615 Affiliated Colleges. Some of the affiliated colleges are as follows:

- Rawat P.G. Girls College
- Shri Satya Sai P.G. College for Women

== Student union ==
=== Previously elected notable presidents ===
This list includes some notable presidents of University of Rajasthan

- Kali Charan Saraf (1974–1975), Member of the Rajasthan Legislative Assembly
- Rajendra Singh Rathore (1978–1979), former Member of the Rajasthan Legislative Assembly
- Mahesh Joshi (1979–1980), former Member of the Rajasthan Legislative Assembly and Lok Sabha
- Rajpal Singh Shekhawat (1980–1981), former Member of the Rajasthan Legislative Assembly
- Pratap Singh Khachariyawas (1992–1993), former cabinet minister in Government of Rajasthan
- Mahendra Chaudhary (1995–1996), former Member of the Rajasthan Legislative Assembly
- Hanuman Beniwal (1997–1998), founder of Rashtriya Loktantrik Party (RLP) and Member of Parliament, Lok Sabha
- Rajkumar Sharma (1999–2000), former Member of the Rajasthan Legislative Assembly
- Manish Yadav (2010-2011), Member of the Rajasthan Legislative Assembly

== Notable alumni ==
- Arvind Panagariya, Chancellor of Nalanda University and former Vice Chairperson of NITI Aayog
- Ashok Kumar – field hockey player
- Ravi Kumar Punia – Football player
- Jagdeep Dhankhar – former Vice President of India
- Bhajan Lal Sharma – 14th Chief Minister of Rajasthan
- Rohit Bohra, politician and businessman
- D. P. Sharma – digital diplomat, computer scientist and social activist
- Jainendra K. Jain – physicist
- Bhupendra Jadawat – actor
- Ramkumar Singh – journalist, writer and screenwriter
- Naina Sharma - Sociologist
- Vibhuti Bhushan Sharma – bureaucrat, lawyer
- Vidyadhar Govind Oak – bureaucrat, former Chief Justice of Allahabad High Court
- Vineet Soni – biologist
- Hanuman Beniwal – politician and the member of Lok Sabha
- Zuhair Al-Shun, diplomat, Ambassador of Palestine to Indonesia (2018–present)
- Yogendra Yadav, Politician and Psephologist
- Lalit Yadav, politician and member of the Rajasthan Legislative Assembly, elected in 2023 from Mundawar.
- Manish Yadav, Politician and the member of Rajasthan Legislative Assembly representing the Shahpura.
- Rajkumar Roat, Politician and the member of 18th Lok Sabha.
